= History of Stamford, Connecticut =

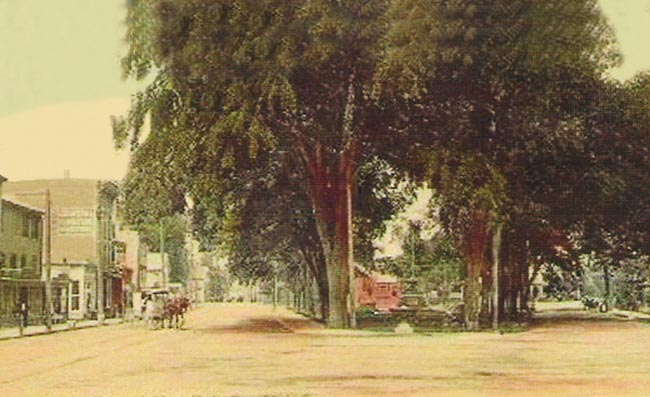
View of West Park, now Columbus Park in downtown Stamford, from a 1906 postcard

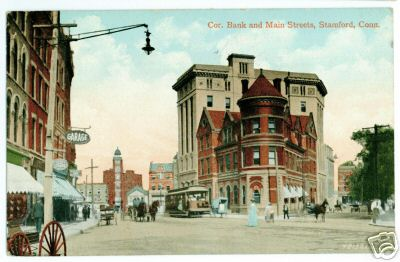
Bank and Main Streets, from a 1911 postcard

Stamford, Connecticut was inhabited by Siwanoy Native Americans, prior to European colonization beginning in the mid-17th century. Stamford grew rapidly due to industrialization in the late-19th and early-20th century, and continued to grow rapidly throughout much of the mid-20th century. During the late-20th century, Stamford underwent a period of urban renewal which saw much redevelopment in its downtown. Stamford's population has continued to grow throughout the 21st century, with redevelopments in its downtown and the South End.

== Colonial history ==
Stamford was known as Rippowam by the Siwanoy Native American inhabitants to the region, and the very first European settlers to the area also referred to it that way. On July 1, 1640, Nathaniel Turner of the New Haven Colony signed an agreement to purchase the land comprising present-day Stamford, Darien, western New Canaan, and Pound Ridge and Bedford in present-day New York with Siwanoy Sagamores, Wascussee, and Ponus. The land was acquired by the New Haven colony for 12 coats, 12 hoes, 12 hatchets, 12 glass mirrors, 12 knives, two kettles, and four fathoms of white wampum. However, the Siwanoy parties to the agreement may not have fully understood the agreement, as that they did not buy nor sell land, and linguistic differences may have prevented them from fully understanding the deal. The deed was modified in 1655, 1662, and 1701, with each modification adding payments to the descendants of Ponus, but did not provide any clarifications as to the land deal itself.

The first European colonists, Reverent Richard Denton of Wethersfield and his family, settled the area in mid-May 1641. Later on in the spring, 29 Puritan families from Wethersfield moved to the area. The group had formed "The Rippowam Company" on October 19, 1640, to purchase the area from the New Haven Colony, and to settle it under the New Haven Colony's jurisdiction. The name of the settlement was changed to Stamford on April 6, 1642, after the town in Lincolnshire, England, where more than 80% of New England's original English settlers hailed from. Denton and his family, alongside 17 other families, would leave Stamford for Hempstead, on Long Island, in 1644.

In 1642, Captain John Underhill settled in Stamford and the following year represented the town in the New Haven Colony General Court.

Stamford was included in the creation of a New Haven confederation called the United Colonies of New England, alongside New Haven, Guilford, Milford, as well as Southold on Long Island. Shortly after the restoration of Charles II of England, in a session of the Connecticut General Court held on October 9, 1662, the former New Haven "plantations" of Stanford (sic), Greenwich, Guilford, and even Southold were to be recognized as Connecticut Colony towns with constables sworn in.

During the 1640s, a mill was built on the Rippowam River, and a wooden meeting house was built. The first public schoolhouse was built in Stamford in 1671, and has been described by a local historian as a "crude, unheated wooden structure only ten or twelve feet square". It was built when settlers tore down their original meeting house, which they had outgrown after three decades, and used some of the timbers to put up a school near the Old Town Hall on Atlantic Square. On the nearby common they built a new 38 square feet (3.5 m^{2}) meeting house, which also served as the Congregational church.

As Stamford expanded throughout the late 17th century, people settled farther and farther from the settlement's center, and had to travel farther to access public services. The predecessor to the Boston Post Road, originally called King's Highway or County Road, was built in 1673. As a result, in 1680, people who settled in the far northern reaches of Stamford split off into the town of Bedford. A treaty in 1683 between Connecticut and New York set an agreed-upon border 8 miles (13 km) north of Stamford's main road, resulting in part of the settlement falling under New York's jurisdiction.

Following the resignation of local Reverend John Bishop, Reverend John Davenport assumed the role of Stamford's spiritual leader in 1694. Davenport, who ruled until his death in February 1731, governed in a conservative style, and under his rule, Stamford accepted few new inhabitants. Following Davenport's death, the Congregational Church lost control over local town meetings, and in 1737, the Canaan and Middlesex Parishes split off from Stamford to form new settlements. Further religious fractures emerged in subsequent years with the establishment of an Anglican church in Stamford in 1742, Baptist churches in 1773 and 1790, a Methodist church in 1788, and a New Light preacher resulting from the First Great Awakening.

One of the primary industries of the small colony was merchandising by water, which was possible due to Stamford's proximity to New York.

=== Revolutionary War ===
420 residents of Stamford engaged in military service on behalf of the Patriot cause during the American Revolutionary War, with 165 serving in the Continental Army and the rest doing so as militiamen; 22 of them died during the war. Stamford was not affected by the conflict to the extent of neighboring towns in Connecticut, several of which were raided or burnt by British forces. During the Revolutionary War, Fort Stamford was built as part of a ring of forts (others at New Castle, New York and White Plains, New York) ordered by General George Washington to aid in the defense of Connecticut from Loyalist raids. Fort Stamford was designed by Rufus Putnam, and General David Waterbury oversaw the construction in 1781. At its peak, the fort was home to 800 soldiers.

== 19th century ==
Starting in 1825, Stamford was served by steamboat service to New York by the Stamford Steamboat Company. The service ran three times a week, and carried local produce and about 500 passengers.

The densely settled portion of Stamford incorporated as a borough in 1830.

In 1838, William Betts founded Betts Academy, a private all-boys academy in Stamford, which operated until it burned in 1908.

Train service began in Stamford in 1848, and regular service along the New Haven Line began on January 1, 1849. The introduction of train service in Stamford improved access to the city, helped develop its industry, and attracted immigrants. Stamford's population grew from about 5,000 in 1850 to 11,000 in 1880. Stamford's first major wave of immigration originated largely from Ireland, and Irish immigrants worked in the city's mills, as day laborers, gardeners, and coachmen. During this time, a sizeable Irish-American community called "Dublin" formed near the city's railroad tracks. However, some of Stamford's Protestant residents displayed prejudice against the city's Irish-American community, and believed that they were subservient to the Pope. A Catholic church, the Basilica of Saint John the Evangelist, was built in Stamford in 1851. The church relocated to a larger building along Atlantic Street that was completed in 1886.

Stamford's first school with defined grades, the Centre School, opened on Broad Street, near the location of Stamford's original schoolhouse, in 1852. The original Centre School building, which was made of wood, burned, and was replaced by a brick building in 1867.

A private all-girls school, called Catherine Aiken, opened in Stamford in 1855. At one point Georges Clemenceau taught French at the school, and married a student from the school, Mary Plummer. The school closed in the 1890s.

By the 1860s, competition from train service forced steamboat service in Stamford to shutter.

In 1873, Stamford's Town School Committee created Stamford High School, to be housed in a room of the Centre School. Originally, students had to pass an examination to gain admission into the high school.

King School, another private all-boys school, opened in 1876. The school still exists in Stamford today, although it is now coeducational.

Starting in 1866, there had been discussions about creating a horse-drawn streetcar company to service Stamford, Connecticut. A charter for such a company was secured in 1870, but it expired before any plans could be made.

A new charter such a service was licensed in 1886, creating the Stamford Horse Railroad Company. Beginning on January 31, 1887, horse-drawn streetcars began running in Stamford. After going bankrupt in December 1888, the company was reorganized as the Stamford Street Railroad Company, and received approval to run electric streetcars.

In 1890, a local chapter of the Ancient Order of Hibernians was established in Stamford, named after Irish-American Civil War general Philip Sheridan.

In 1893, the central and denser portions of Stamford incorporated as a city.

Beginning in 1894, electric streetcars began servicing Stamford. Horse-drawn streetcars were phased out during the 1890s.

The New York, New Haven and Hartford Railroad acquired a controlling stake in the Stamford Street Railroad Company on or about April 1, 1895.

In 1896, a dedicated building for Stamford's high school was built, located on Forest Street.

Starting in the late 19th century, New York residents built summer homes on the shoreline, and even back then there were some who moved to Stamford permanently and started commuting to Manhattan by train, although the practice became more popular later.

== 20th century ==
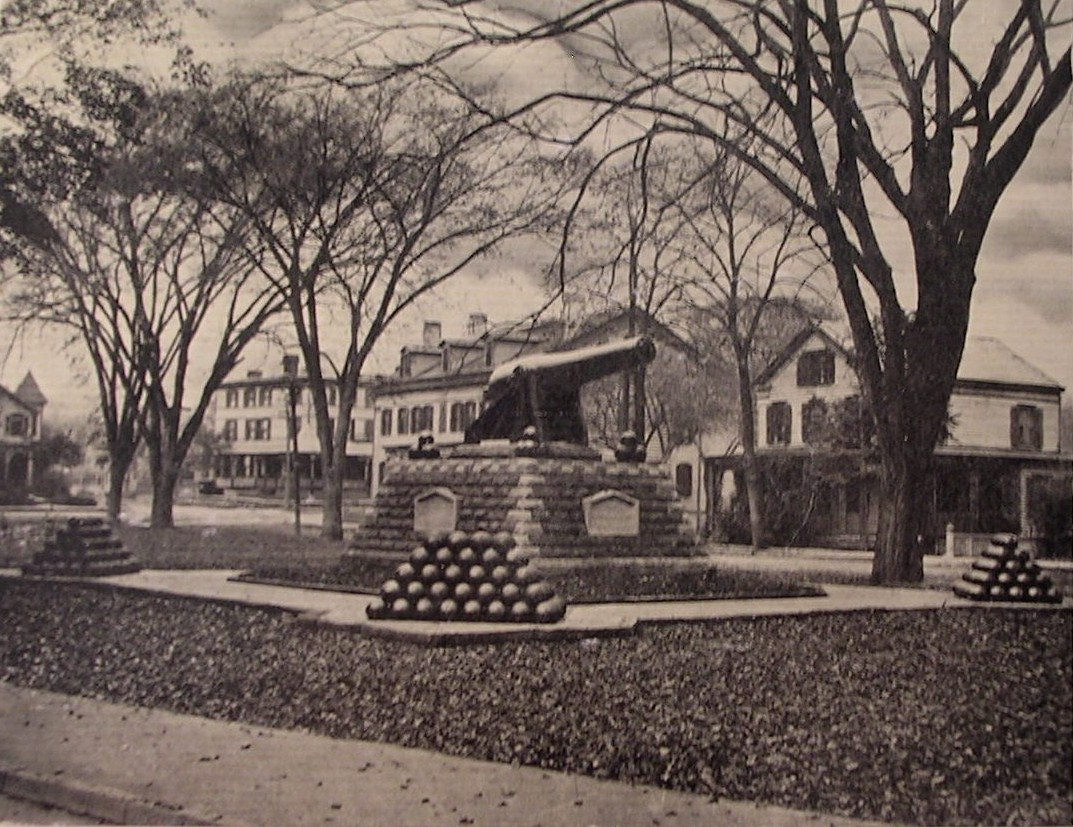
USS Kearsarge Gun Memorial in West Park, now Columbus Park, in Downtown Stamford

On Memorial Day, 1901, a cannon from the USS Kearsarge was placed in West Park (now Columbus Park) as a memorial to Civil War veterans. Cast at West Point in 1827, the cannon had also been used on the USS Lancaster. The artillery piece sat in the park until 1942 when it was hauled away for scrap.

In 1904, the Town Hall burnt down. A new building in the Beaux Arts style was constructed from 1905 (when the cornerstone was laid) to 1907 in the triangular block formed by Main, Bank and Atlantic streets. The building was eventually named Old Town Hall and held the mayor's office until about 1961, when Mayor William Kennedy moved to the Municipal Office Building which formerly stood further south on Atlantic Avenue. Nearly all municipal offices were moved to 888 Washington Boulevard in 1988.

On September 26, 1905, the Consolidated Railway Company (the Connecticut Company) acquired the assets of the Stamford Company.

On February 19, 1919, at the site of the present Cove Island Park, in the Cove section of Stamford, the Cove Mill factory of the Stamford Manufacturing Company burned to the ground in a spectacular conflagration.

State Trade School, a vocational school now known as J.M. Wright Technical High School, opened in 1919 on Schuyler Avenue.

The current building of Stamford High School, located on Strawberry Hill Avenue, was completed in 1928.

Stamford is the birthplace of the electric dry shaver industry. By 1940 Colonel Jacob Schick employed almost 1,000 workers at the Schick Dry Shaver Company on Atlantic Street.

=== Ku Klux Klan in Stamford ===
The Ku Klux Klan, which preached a doctrine of Protestant control of America and suppression of blacks, Jews and Catholics, had a following in Stamford in the 1920s. Across the state, the Klan's popularity peaked in 1925 when it had a statewide membership of 15,000. Stamford was one of the communities where the group was most active in the state, although New Haven and New Britain were also centers of support.

During the 1924 election, one of the largest Klan meetings in the state took place in Stamford. Grand Dragon Harry Lutterman of Darien organized the meeting, attended by thousands of Klansmen.

The Stamford Republican Party used its Lincoln Republican Club as a front for all Klan activities in the area. The Stamford Advocate (as The Advocate of Stamford was then known) published an advertisement signed by local Democrats (who relied on the Catholic vote) protesting the meeting. The Klan published an advertisement in response, noting the "un-American" names of some of those who signed the Democrats' statement.

By 1926, the Klan leadership in the state was divided, and it lost strength, although it continued to maintain small, local branches for years afterward in Stamford, as well as in Bridgeport, Darien, Greenwich and Norwalk.

=== New Deal era ===
Stamford's electric trolley services ceased on November 11, 1933, when the last streetcar left Stamford for good at 11:35pm. This end was driven in part by increased competition from buses.

Due to the proliferation of automobiles in Stamford and elsewhere in the region beginning at the turn of the century, work began on the Merritt Parkway in the north of Stamford in 1934. The Merritt Parkway was opened in 1938.

=== Yale and Towne strike ===
By the end of World War II, manufacturing accounted for a majority of employment in Stamford. The largest employer in this sector was Yale & Towne, a lock manufacturer which employed more than 3,000 of the city's 65,000 residents. During the war, the company's production shifted towards the war effort, and the company reluctantly recognized a workers' union affiliated with the International Association of Machinists. On March 21, 1945, the company's contract with the union expired, and months of tense negotiations followed. Major points of contention during the negotiations included the company's demands for an open shop, and no wage increase. After Yale & Towne fired the union's chief steward on September 21, the Stamford factory's 3,000-plus workers walked off the job for several days in a wildcat strike. Yale & Towne responded by declaring the strike had terminated its contract with the union, and the company union in turn then officially declared a strike on November 7, 1945. In the first weeks of the strike, the union picketed outside of the plant, at one point preventing the company president, W. Gibson Carey, from entering the plant. The picket sometimes turned physical, and police forces in Stamford declined Yale & Towne's request to forcefully break up the picket line. The company then appealed to the state's Republican governor Raymond E. Baldwin to send in the state police to break up the strike, which he did. The state police's violent break up of the strike picket in late December 1945 led to the union to call for a day of action on January 3, 1946.

==== General strike and aftermath ====
On January 3, 1946, approximately 10,000 people in Stamford engaged in a general strike to support the striking Yale & Towne Factory workers. Instead of showing up for work, many workers rallied in Downtown Stamford, shutting down much of its stores, theaters, and its transit. Solidarity strikes were held by an addition 2,000 to 3,000 workers in Greenwich, Norwalk, and Port Chester.

The general strike led to widespread national attention, and accelerated progress on the contract negotiation process. AFL and CIO locals began pooling resources for a strike support fund. Eight days after the general strike, the Stamford Retail Merchants Associated paid for a full-page advertisement in the Stamford Advocate in which it declared it would also support the strike fund. Yale & Towne proposed a 14% wage increase for workers, but reiterated its demand for an open shop. An official from the Department of Labor proposed a compromise settlement which would send most of the dispute to arbitration, saying "if the company doesn't follow along this suggestion...it will be clear to my mind that they are trying to bust the union". Yale & Towne rejected the proposal. Stamford's Mayor, Charles Moore, also denounced Yale & Towne's actions, writing to the company "You haven't shown the spirit of the American way. You've put forth every argument as much as to say that you won't negotiate a contract".

Despite this major shift in opinion, the strike continued through the early months of 1946, and incidents of violence and arrests continued. In mid-March, the AFL and CIO weighed another city-wide demonstration to try to further hasten the end of the strike. It wasn't until April 5 that the company and the union reached a settlement, with the aid of federal and state officials. The agreement ensured the future existence of the union at the factory, wage increases, and union security.

=== Downtown redevelopment ===
In the years following World War II, Stamford's manufacturing industry began to decline. Existing factories in the area, many well over a half century old, were too small and outdated compared to newly built facilities. Yale & Towne, a sizable employer in town, began reducing the size of its workforce in Stamford in 1948.

On April 15, 1949, the central portion of Stamford, which was incorporated as a city, and the peripheral portion of Stamford, which was incorporated as a town, consolidated into one single city.

During the 1950s, as traffic continued to grow along the Post Road and elsewhere, work began on the Connecticut Turnpike, which was locally part of Interstate 95. In 1956, Interstate 95, which runs through Stamford from west to east, was opened.

UConn Stamford opened in 1951 as a two-year college.

By the early 1950s, Stamford's urban core began experiencing urban blight in former manufacturing areas. The town leaders at the time sought federal and state funding to launch a revitalization effort that would restore the core of the city to a vital urban center. The city formed the Urban Redevelopment Commission, meant to reverse its now-declining economic base. Early on, the Urban Redevelopment Commission aimed to redevelop sites which formerly hosted heavy industry to be suitable for light industry and research and development facilities. The city's heavy industry continued to decline throughout the mid and late 1950s. Yale & Towne downsized its operations in 1955, and closed down its Stamford facilities in 1959.

Rippowam High School opened on High Ridge Road in 1961. A third high school, Westhill High School, opened on Roxbury Road in 1971.

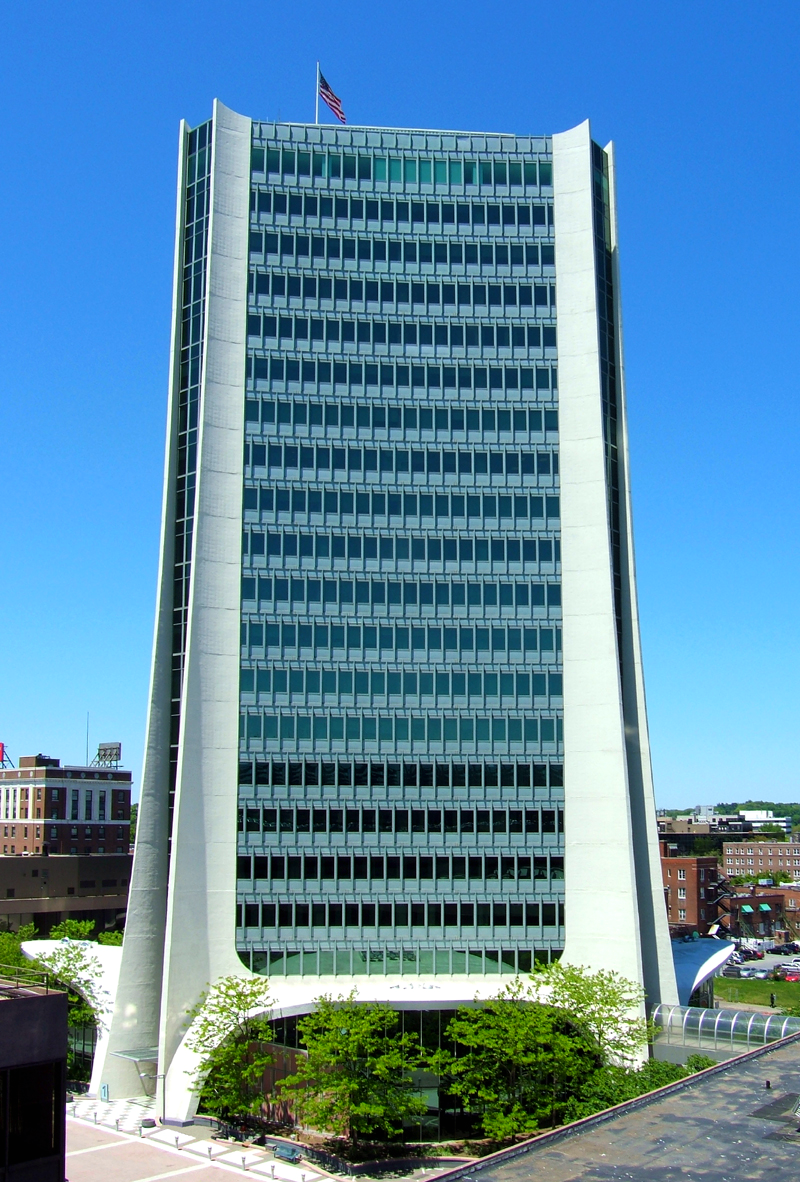
One Landmark Square, built by F.D. Rich and opened in 1973

On January 27, 1960, the City of Stamford and its redevelopment arm, the Urban Redevelopment Commission, entered into a contract with the Stamford New Urban Corporation, a subsidiary of the locally based and nationally active construction contractor the F.D. Rich Company that would lead to a dramatic altering of the face of downtown Stamford. The Rich Company, led by Frank D. Rich Jr., Robert N. Rich and Chief Legal Counsel Lawrence Gochberg, actively building in 25 of the 50 United States at the time, was selected out of a field of 10 developers vying for the opportunity to become the city's sole redeveloper of the 130-acre (0.53 km^{2}) section of the central downtown area known as the Southeast Quadrant. More than $100 million in Federal, State and city funds were invested in a massive property acquisition, relocation, demolition and infrastructure creation program that paved the way for one of the most sweeping urban renewal efforts ever carried out in the United States. The redevelopment was highly contentious since its inception. The plan involved eminent domain takings, the demolition of nine city blocks, the relocation of 110 families and 400 businesses. A group of Stamford residents unsuccessfully tried to use legal action to prevent it from taking place. F.D. Rich bought large swathes of land downtown, following the destruction of existing buildings on the site. The company stated it paid between $50,000 to $200,000 per acre of land, land which local real estate experts would value at over $2,000,000 per acre just a decade later. Following delays, construction commenced in 1968 with the St. Johns Towers, three round apartment towers designed by Victor H. Bisharat. Upon its completion, the St. Johns Towers contained 360 apartments and originally served as relocation housing for some of the displaced residents. Most of the deteriorated buildings were razed to make way for the new downtown, resulting in a lack of historic buildings and a downtown that looks more contemporary and modern as compared to some its New England counterparts.

During the 1960s and 1970s, a large number of corporations relocated offices to Stamford and other more suburban environments, and F.D. Rich responded by building large quantities of office buildings. F.D. Rich opened High Ridge Park, a large suburban office complex near North Stamford, in 1967. The complex was designed by Victor H. Bisharat. In 1973, F.D. Rich completed construction on the headquarter building for telecom company GTE, and One Landmark Square, both in downtown and also designed by Bisharat. The completion of the GTE World Headquarters in 1973 became the catalyst for downtown office development, setting an example for other corporations seeking a less expensive labor pool, a more favorable income tax structure and lower operating costs. In 1977, F.D. Rich built the 505-room Stamford Marriott. The building was designed by Victor H. Bisharat, and has a revolving restaurant overlooking Long Island Sound at the top.

Many of F.D. Rich's constructions during this time drew heavy criticism for being autocentric and hostile to pedestrians. Many of the buildings along Tresser Boulevard, parallel to Interstate 95, had little but street-level lobby spaces, garage entrances and exits accessing the street, although they presented a modern, glittering glass facade to travelers along the highway. Tresser Boulevard became notorious among many architecture and urban design critics. These pedestal-style buildings feature above-ground parking structures, as the high water table in the area prohibited the development of multiple levels of underground parking. These podiums for the office buildings also provide the opportunity for a view over the adjacent highway embankment to the south. The lack of retail along the Tresser Blvd. frontage is attributable to a prohibition on retail being developed in this area by the Planning Board of the City who did not want to dilute the retail existing and planned elsewhere in the renewal area.

F.D. Rich's leadership has stated that the company intentionally designed much of the area to be actively inaccessible to pedestrians, and continued to defend such practices even decades after the construction of these buildings. Robert Rich, the then-President of F.D. Rich told a New York Times reporter in 1985 in response to criticism over its pedestrian-hostile designs that ''Downtown Stamford isn't going to be another Madison Avenue", "but what we are seeing here is a new kind of environment. I think it's a big success". He added that "it would have been nice to make a pedestrian paradise, but we discovered early on that we had no ability to do that. The corporations demand parking galore. If they are going to move from New York, they want a suburban, campuslike setting. And if they are coming to downtown Stamford, they want access by automobile and only automobile". In 1999, Robert Rich told another New York Times that ''the streets were never meant to be for pedestrians'', and that ''GTE came here because they were bombed in New York. Crime was a problem in the city. That's why the buildings were designed to be impenetrable". By the mid-2000s, F.D. Rich began making alterations to their properties in an effort to make it more accessible for people using modes of transportation other than private cars.

Stamford's old downtown has been not so much gentrified as eliminated. In its place has come an injection of high-rise energy into the midst of Fairfield County's otherwise placid suburban landscape. From the Connecticut Turnpike, Stamford now provides a vista that more closely resembles a new city in the Sun Belt than an old city in the Northeast. The city's new skyline seems made to be seen from a passing automobile.

Indeed, the whole identity of downtown Stamford is as much that of a city like Houston or Atlanta than a part of the New York metropolitan area. Stamford has come to have all the characteristics of an automobileoriented, Sun Belt city. It gives off the aura of having no past at all - an aura that may not be very surprising in Houston but is more than a little disquieting in a city that was first settled in 1641.

But making Stamford still more like a postwar city of the South or the Southwest is the fact that within its rebuilt downtown there is no longer any conventional urban pattern of streets and city blocks. There is no need for them, for the city has been redesigned to accommodate the automobile, with expressways and wide boulevards, not streets for walking. The buildings appear to have been dropped helterskelter in the landscape, as if no one expected any of them to be approached except by car.

— Paul Goldberger, "Stamford's Renewal: Sun Belt in Connecticut", The New York Times

In 1980 F.D. Rich completed 10 Stamford Forum, a 250,000 square feet (23,000 m^{2}) office building designed by Steven M. Goldberg of the New York office of Mitchell/Giurgola.

In 1980, Stamford released plans for a new train station, construction of which began in 1983. The station, known as the Stamford Transportation Center, opened in 1987.

The Stamford Town Center shopping mall, which was built by F.D. Rich and Taubman Centers, was opened in 1982. Other major buildings completed by F.D. Rich during the 1980s included 4 Stamford Forum (designed by César Pelli), 6 Stamford Forum (designed by Arthur Erickson), and 8 Stamford Forum (designed by Hugh Stubbins). Later in the decade, F.D. Rich built 300 Atlantic Street (designed by Aldo Giurgola), and 177 Broad Street.

During a 42-day strike among Metro-North workers in 1983, various private shuttle and bus services from Stamford to New York City and elsewhere emerged, although some disbanded after the end of the strike.

During the late 1980s and 1990s, low real estate prices severely slowed new construction projects in Stamford's downtown, the city was hit with a wave of corporate relocations out of Stamford, and prominent retail outlets closed. During this time, F.D. Rich was heavily indebted, and had to surrender about 80% of its real estate portfolio to banks. In 1994, Stamford's South End was designated as an "enterprise zone", which aimed to draw development by offering tax breaks and credits.

The city's economy rebounded by the late 1990s, fueled by a rebound in office occupancy rates, and an increasing diversification of the downtown's economy. A large trading floor for Swiss Bank Corporation was constructed, UConn Stamford rebuilt its campus, the city's Palace Theater was expanded, and a number of large apartment complexes were built. F.D. Rich began work on the Majestic movie theater on Summer Street. The city and developers also began considering pedestrians when creating new developments.

In 1997, the Stamford Organizing Project, a trade union coalition, was formed in Stamford to improve local workplace rights, health care, and affordable housing. The project ultimately helped 4,500 workers in area unionize and secure contracts, helped secure $15 million in improvements for public housing.

== 21st century ==
On September 11, 2001, nine city residents lost their lives in the 9/11 attacks, all at the World Trade Center: Alexander Braginsky, 38; Stephen Patrick Cherry, 41; Geoffrey W. Cloud, 36; John Fiorito, 40; Bennett Lawson Fisher, 58; Paul R. Hughes, 38; Sean Rooney, 50 (whose widow, Beverly Eckert, became a leading 9/11 family activist); Randolph Scott, 48; and Thomas F. Theurkauf Jr., 44. A total of 65 Connecticut residents lost their lives on that day.

In 2003, the Stamford Transportation Center was renovated.

In 2005, the company opened its 115-room Courtyard by Marriott Hotel at the corner of Summer and Broad Streets.

One of the biggest fires in Stamford's history occurred April 3, 2006 in the South End. The fire started in a piano store in a building that was part of the former Yale & Towne lock factory complex. It spread to a neighboring building housing antiques dealers. Eight businesses were destroyed and others were damaged. City fire marshals never determined the cause, but said an unfixed sprinkler system helped the fire spread. Firefighters used 1 million gallons (3,800,000 L) of water in three hours and then had to pump water from Long Island Sound when the water mains ran out. Dark mushroom clouds formed over the scene, visible for miles along Interstate 95. About 200 residents from homes on Pacific and Henry streets were evacuated. In July 2006, more than 100 antiques dealers filed a class-action lawsuit against the owner, Antares Real Estate Services of Greenwich.

In the early afternoon of August 3, 2006, one of the hottest days of the year when air conditioning raised electricity consumption, downtown Stamford experienced a blackout after underground electricity cables on Summer Street overheated and caught fire. Many offices were forced to close down. A concert (part of the Alive@Five series) with Hootie & the Blowfish continued at Columbus Park early that evening, but many restaurants had to throw out their food beforehand.

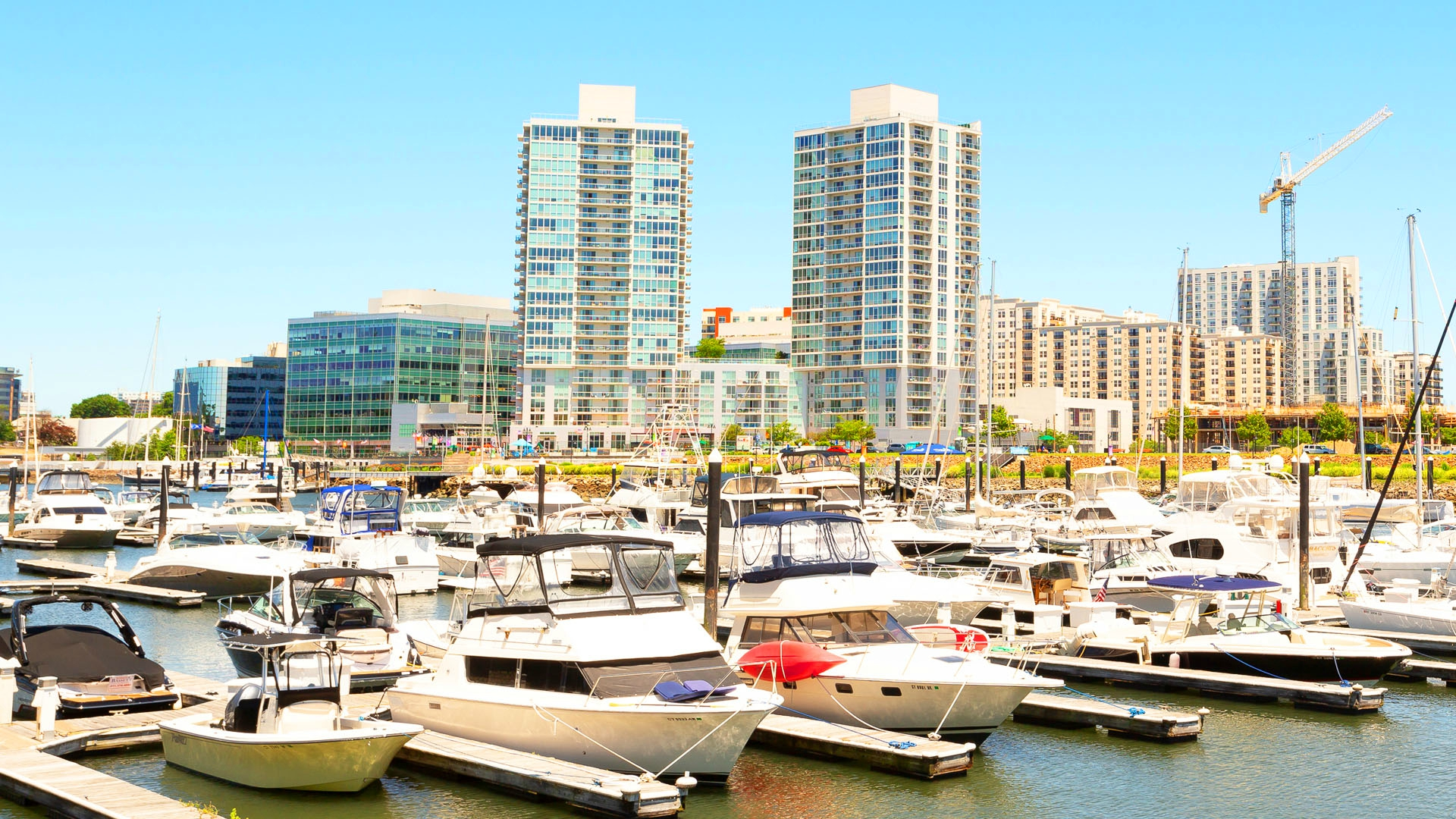
A marina in Stamford's Harbor Point, a large development built during the 21st century

On October 11, 2007, a freak storm dumped 5 inches (130 mm) of rain in about four hours in Stamford and nearby communities of New Canaan, Darien and Norwalk. The storm flooded streets and basements and caused the loss of electricity to 700 homes, with about 20 people needing to be evacuated from their cars and 40 others removed from their homes to an emergency shelter. The Federal Emergency Management Agency later said 41 homes in Stamford (and 11 in Darien and New Canaan) had about $167,000 in damage. City sewers and drains were clogged. The city was sued in 2009 by homeowners who asserted that a city employee failed to start a pumping station on Dyke Street soon enough, but a city lawyer called the event a "100-year storm" that simply overwhelmed municipal resources.

F. D. Rich, with partners Donald Trump and Louis R. Cappelli, built the Trump Parc Stamford, a 170-unit, 34-story condominium tower which was the tallest building in the city at the time of its opening in 2009, eclipsing One Landmark Square by more than 80 feet (24 m) in height.

In 2012, Stamford's population officially eclipsed Hartford's as Connecticut's third-largest city. Much of Stamford's population growth during the 2000s and 2010s came from Harbor Point, a major development in Stamford's South End.

In 2016, Stamford's oldest extant house, the Hoyt-Barnum House, was relocated from Bedford Street, near downtown, to a location next to the Stamford History Center in North Stamford.

In 2018, the Cappelli Organization opened up the first of its two Atlantic Station towers, next to the United States Post Office–Stamford Main, which hosts 325 residential units and is 280 feet (85 m) tall. The second tower was opened on July 29, 2021.

In 2020, Stamford's population surpassed New Haven as Connecticut's second-largest city.

Historical population of Stamford
1756	2,768
1774	3,563
1782	3,834
1800	4,352
1810	4,440
1820	3,284
1830	3,707
1840	3,516
1850	5,000
1860	7,185
1870	9,714
1880	11,297
1890	15,700
1900	18,839
1910	28,836
1920	40,067
1930	56,765
1940	61,215
1950	74,293
1960	92,713
1970	108,798
1980	102,453
1990	108,056
2000	117,083
2002	119,850 (est.)

== Gallery ==
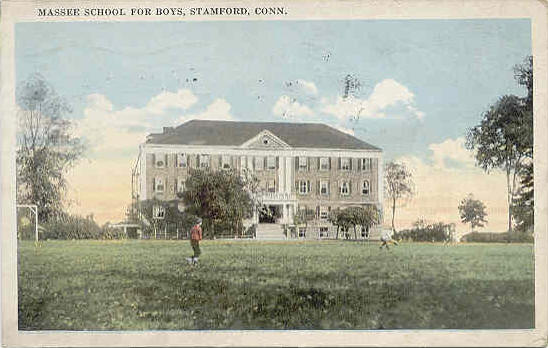
Massee School for Boys, about 1921

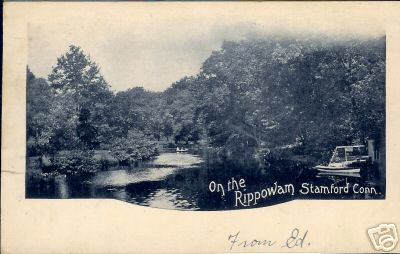
Rippowam River, about 1905

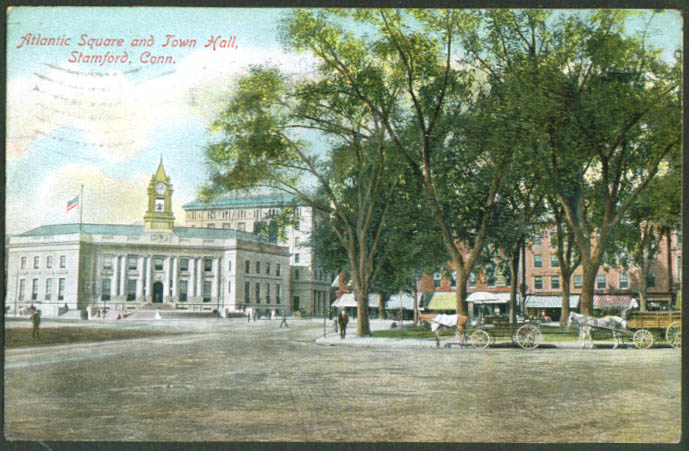
Atlantic Square, ca. 1908

== On the National Register ==
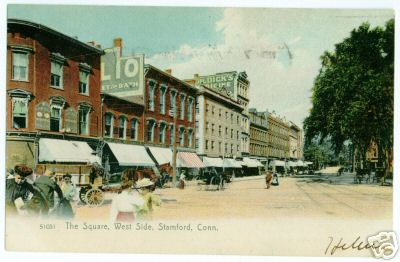
West side of "The Square", from a 1906 postcard

- Agudath Shalom Synagogue—29 Grove St. (added June 11, 1995)
- Benjamin Hait House—92 Hoyclo Road (added December 30, 1978)
- C. J. Starr Barn and Carriage House—200 Strawberry Hill Ave. (added October 14, 1979)
- Church of the Holy Name—305 Washington Blvd. (added 1987)
- Cove Island Houses—Cove Road and Weed Avenue (added June 22, 1979)
- Deacon John Davenport House—129 Davenport Ridge Road (added May 29, 1982)
- Downtown Stamford Historic District—Atlantic, Main, Bank, and Bedford Sts. (added November 6, 1983)
- Downtown Stamford Historic District (Boundary Increase 2)—Roughly, Bedford Street between Broad and Forest Streets (added February, 2003)
- Fort Stamford Site (added October 10, 1975)
- Gustavus and Sarah T. Pike House—164 Fairfield Ave. (added June 24, 1990)
- Hoyt-Barnum House—713 Bedford St. Moved 2016 new location 1508 High Ridge Road (added July 11, 1969)
- John Knap House—984 Stillwater Road (added April 5, 1979)
- Linden Apartments—10-12 Linden Place (added September 11, 1983)
- Long Ridge Village Historic District—Old Long Ridge Road bounded by the New York State Line, Rock Rimmon Road, and Long Ridge Road (state Route 104) (added July 2, 1987)
- Main Street Bridge—Carries Main Street over the Rippowam River (added June 21, 1987)
- Marion Castle, Terre Bonne—1 Rogers Road (added August 1, 1982)
- Nathaniel Curtis House—600 Housatonic Ave. (added May 15, 1982)
- Octagon House—120 Strawberry Hill Ave. (added September 17, 1979)
- Old Town Hall—between Atlantic, Bank, and Main Streets (added July 2, 1972)
- Revonah Manor Historic District—Roughly bounded by Urban Street, East Avenue, Fifth, and Bedford Streets (added August 31, 1986)
- Rockrimmon Rockshelter (added September 5, 1994)
- South End Historic District—Roughly bounded by Metro-North railroad tracks, Stamford Canal, Woodland Cemetery, and Washington Boulevard (added April 19, 1986)
- St. Andrew's Protestant Episcopal Church—1231 Washington Blvd. (added 1983)
- St. Benedict's Church—1A St. Benedict's Circle (added 1987)
- St. John's Protestant Episcopal Church—628 Main St. (added 1987)
- St. Luke's Chapel—714 Pacific St. (added 1987)
- St. Mary's Church—540 Elm St. (added 1987)
- Stamford Harbor Lighthouse—South of breakwater, Stamford Harbor (added May 3, 1991)
- Suburban Club—6 Suburban Ave./580 Main St. (added September 10, 1989)
- Turn-of-River Bridge—Old North Stamford Road at Rippowam River (added August 31, 1987)
- US Post Office-Stamford Main—421 Atlantic St. (added 1985)
- Unitarian Universalist Society in Stamford—20 Forest St. (added 1987)
- Zion Lutheran Church—132 Glenbrook Road (added 1987)
