= Downtown Stamford =

- Downtown Stamford Historic District
- U.S. National Register of Historic Places
- U.S. Historic district
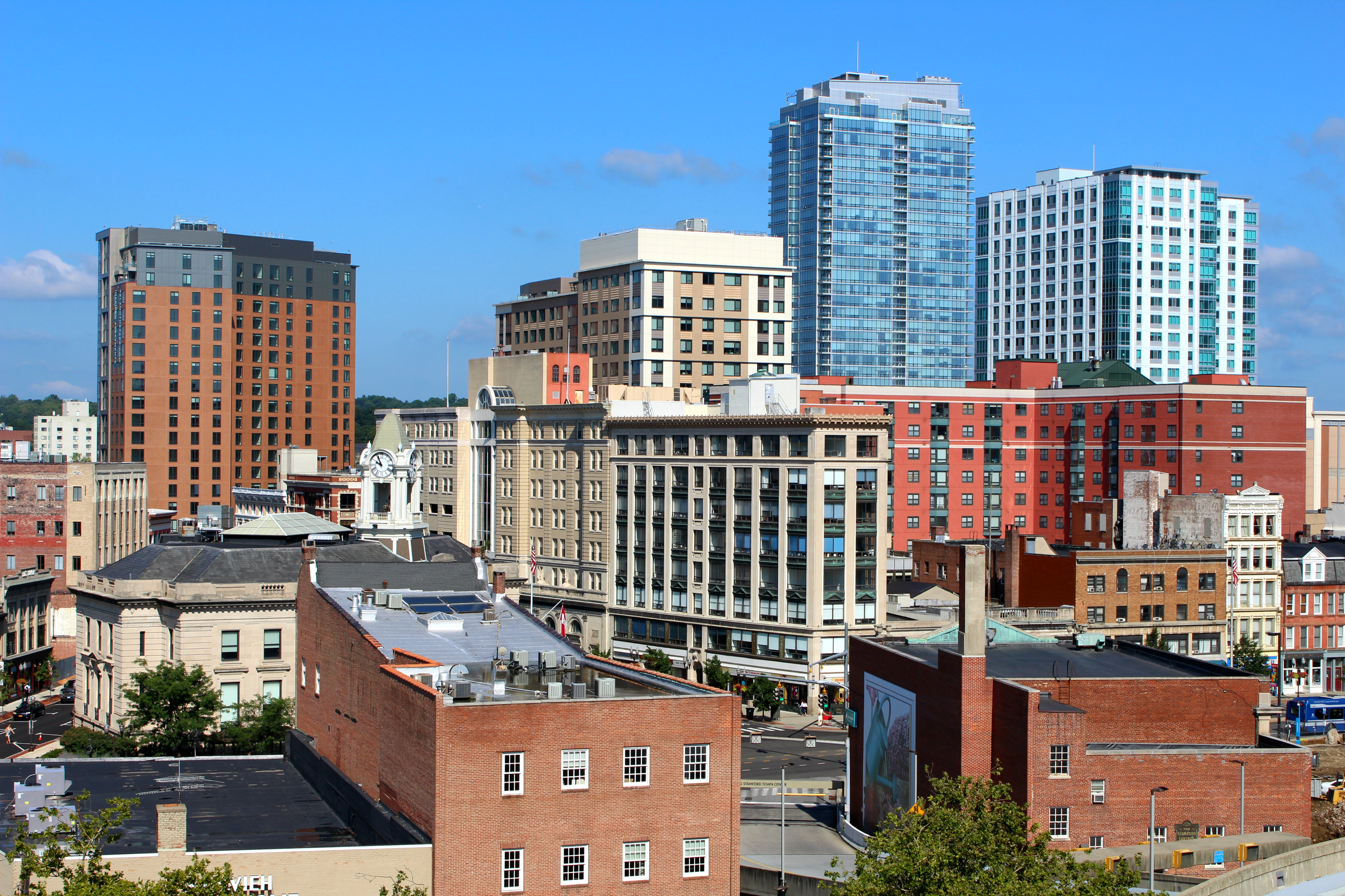
- Downtown Stamford, looking west
- Location: Atlantic, Main, Bank, and Bedford Streets (original); Roughly, Bedford Streets between Broad and Forest Streets (increase); Stamford, Connecticut
- Coordinates: 41°3′8″N 73°32′25″W
- Area: 17.2 acres (7.0 ha); 3.7 acres (1.5 ha) (1984 increase); 5 acres (2.0 ha) (2003 increase)
- Architect: Multiple
- Architectural style: Late 19th and 20th Century Revivals, Late Victorian, Commercial Vernacular, Late 19th And 20th Century Revivals, Modern Movement
- Website: stamford-downtown.com
- NRHP reference No.: 83003502 (original); 85000311 (increase 1); 02001744 (increase 2)

Significant dates
- Added to NRHP: October 6, 1983
- Boundary increases: February 21, 1985; January 31, 2003

Downtown Stamford, or Stamford Downtown, is the central business district of the city of Stamford, Connecticut, United States. It includes major retail establishments, a shopping mall, a university campus, the headquarters of major corporations and Fortune 500 companies, as well as other retail businesses, hotels, restaurants, offices, entertainment venues and high-rise apartment buildings.

Since 2000, new development has consumed much of the Downtown area, with the additions of new high-rise buildings and office towers such as the 34-story Park Tower Stamford formerly Trump Parc Stamford, parks such as the new Mill River Park, and housing such as the new 17-story Highgrove Condominium Residences. Other development projects include new student housing at the UCONN Stamford branch, residential housing, and the planned Ritz-Carlton Stamford development, which will include two 39-story hotel/condominium towers. The city also plans to make improvements to the Atlantic Street underpass beneath the New Haven Line railroad tracks just east of the Stamford Transportation Center in order to alleviate a traffic bottleneck. The improvements are also meant to allow quicker evacuation of areas of the South End if disaster strikes. The project received a $245,000 earmark in the federal budget passed in December 2007.

== Location ==
In relation to other Neighborhoods in Stamford, the Downtown is East of the West Side (separated by the Mill River), North of the South End (separated by Interstate 95 and the Metro-North Railroad Tracks) and Shippan (also separated by the Highway and Railroad), West of the East Side and Glenbrook, and south of Newfield, Belltown, High Ridge and Turn of River. Bull's Head, the mostly commercial area at the intersection of High Ridge Road and Long Ridge Road, is immediately North of the Downtown. The area is within walking distance of the Metro-North Train Station.

== Historic district ==
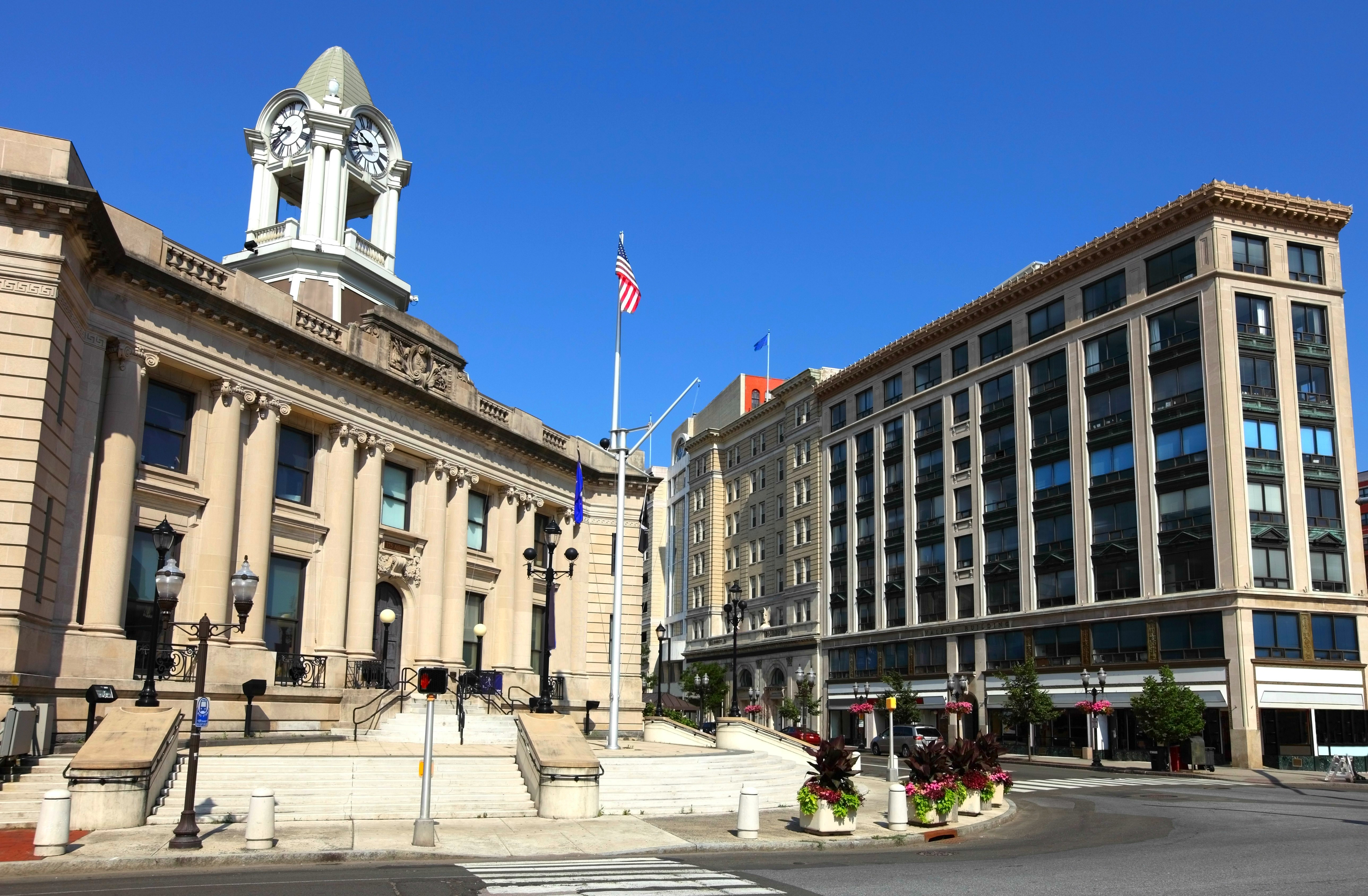
Stamford Old Town Hall

The Downtown area has been the heart of the town since colonial times. Much of the history of Stamford took place in the area.

The Downtown Stamford Historic District is a historic district that was listed on the National Register of Historic Places in 1983. The originally listed area included 56 buildings along Atlantic, Main, Bank, and Bedford Streets, and examples of Late 19th and 20th Century Revivals, Late Victorian, and Commercial Vernacular architecture. Its boundaries were increased in 1985 to include an area bounded by Atlantic, Main, Bank, Bedford, Summer between Broad and Main Streets and Summer Pl. The 1985 boundary increase captured the only surviving area in downtown of lower-rent commercial structures such as warehouses, laundries, and stables. Its boundaries were further increased in 2002 to include an area including Late 19th And 20th Century Revivals and Modern Movement architecture, roughly, Bedford Street between Broad and Forest Streets. The 2002 increase added the 1939-built Avon Theatre and other buildings, adding Late Gothic Revival and Art Deco architectural styles not included in the first and second areas. The current boundaries of the historic district now encompass most of the southern half of Downtown. The historic district designated in 1983 included the largest remaining area of pre-1930s commercial and institutional buildings in downtown Stamford. The 1985 boundary increase captured the only surviving area in downtown of lower-rent commercial structures such as warehouses, laundries, and stables. The 2002 increase added the 1939-built Avon Theatre and other buildings, adding Late Gothic Revival and Art Deco architectural styles not included in the first and second areas.

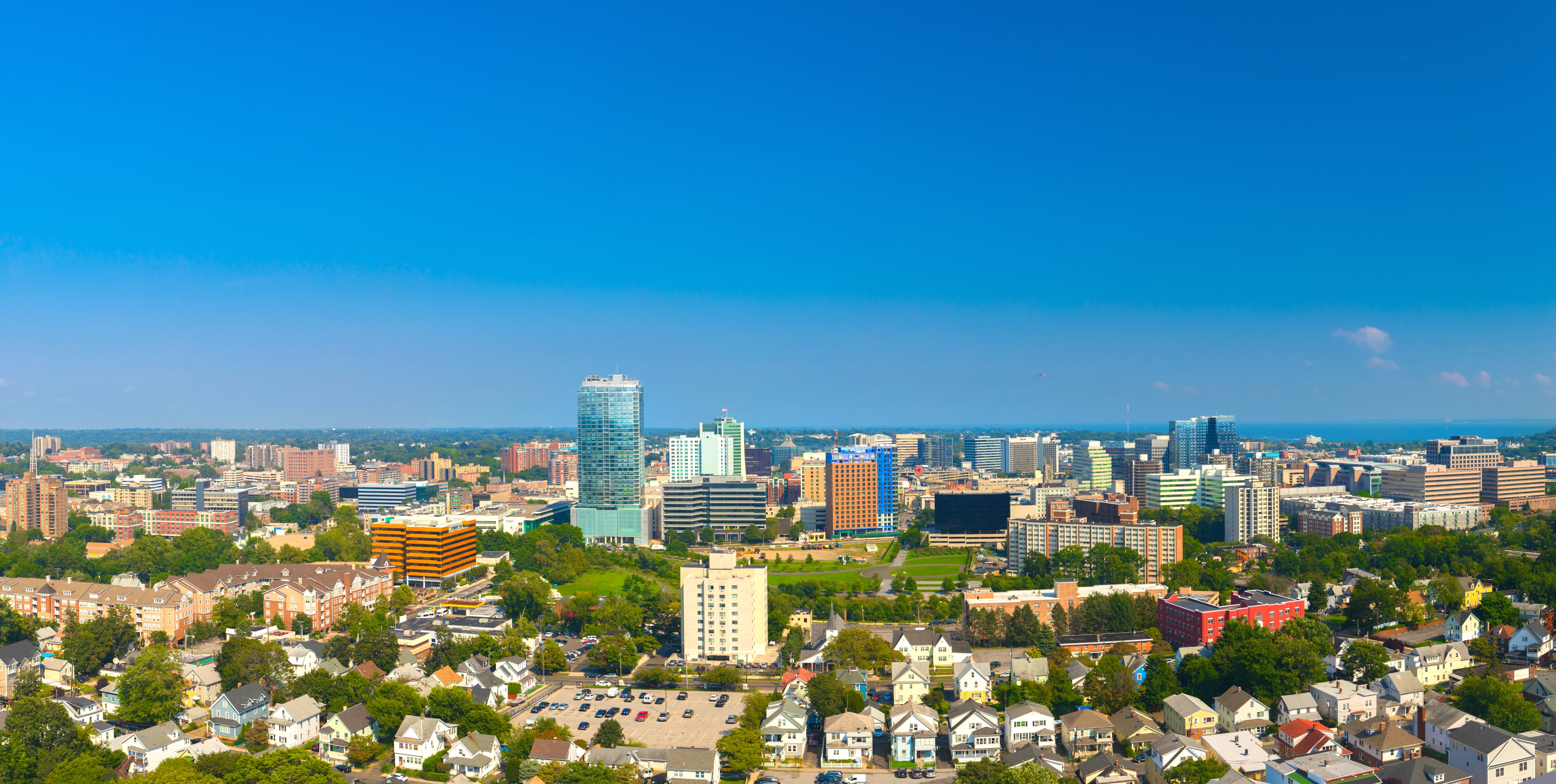
Downtown Stamford skyline in 2018

== Distinctive architecture ==
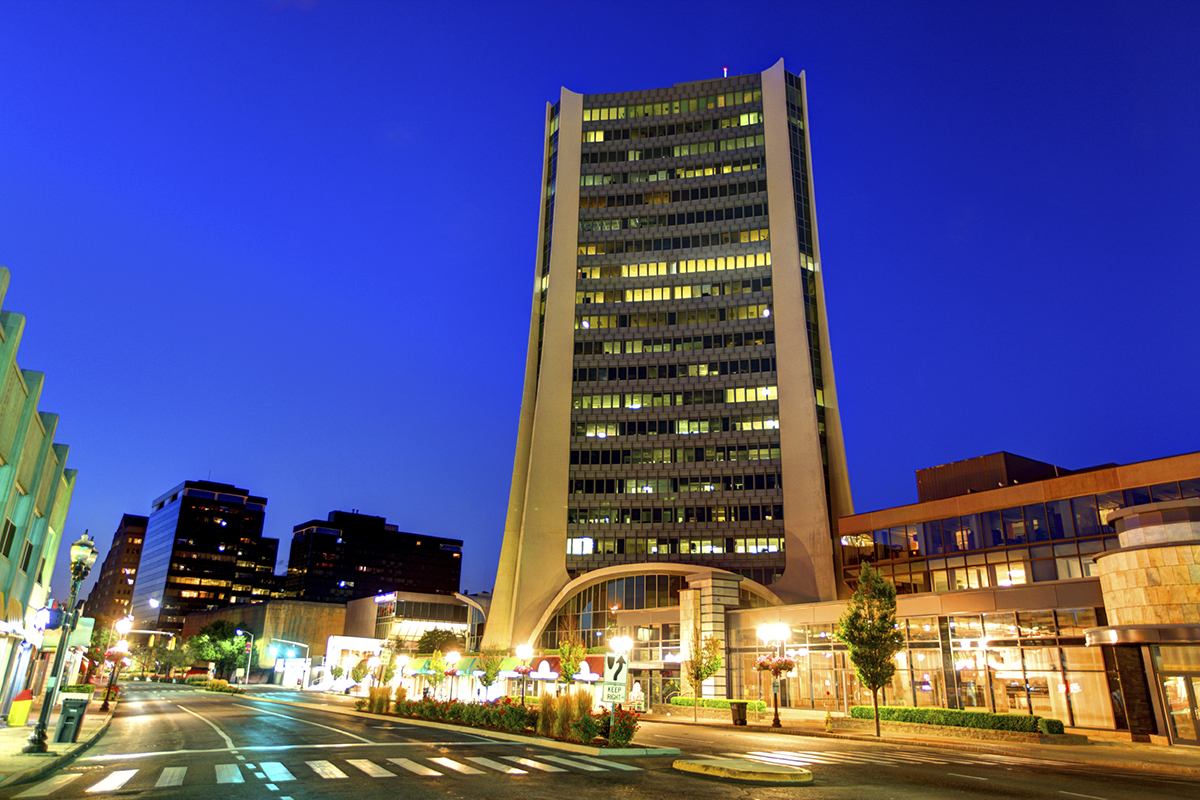
One Landmark Square, the third tallest building in Stamford, at 22 stories.

=== High rises ===
Over the past 15 years, Downtown Stamford has experienced a boom in high-rise building construction.

- Park Tower Stamford -- Finished in 2009, the 34-story condominium tower is currently the tallest building in Stamford at 350 feet (107 m) tall. The building currently features 170 condominium units and a 6-story parking podium. It was designed by Costas Kondylis, who was well known for his high-rise residential design.
- Atlantic Station -- Completed in 2017 by RXR Realty, the 26-story luxury apartment tower features 325 residential units, over 20,000 square feet (1,900 m^{2}) of retail, and 333 parking spaces. The tower is currently the second tallest building in Stamford, at 315 feet (96 m) tall. A second residential tower is currently under construction adjacent to the current tower.
- One Landmark Square -- Completed in 1973 at a cost of $35 million, the "Landmark" in its name is no exaggeration. When it was built, the 295-foot-tall (90 m), 22-story office building towered over a much lower skyline, and it remains the third-tallest building in the city, the tallest office high-rise, as well as one of the most distinctive buildings in Downtown Stamford. Five smaller buildings designed by Moshe Safdie were later built around the tower, comprising the Landmark Square office complex.
- Summer House -- Completed in 2016, the 250-foot-tall (76 m), 22-story residential building is the fourth-tallest building in Stamford. The steel building features 226 luxury rental units, and an Australian restaurant, Flinders Lane, on the ground floor.

=== Victor Bisharat's buildings ===
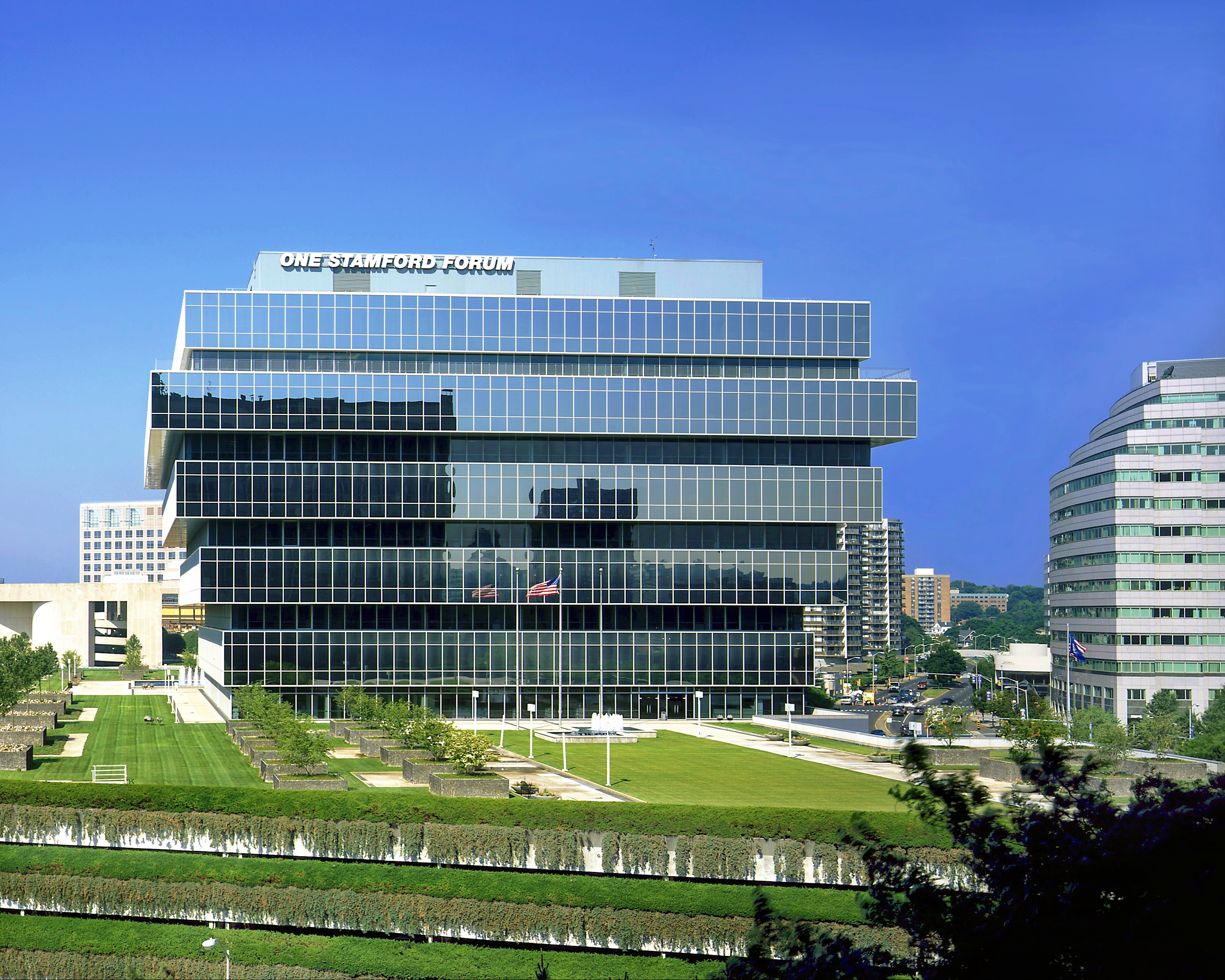
One Stamford Forum in 2010.

Many of the most distinctive buildings in Downtown Stamford were designed by the late Victor Bisharat, a Jordanian who received his education at the American University in Beirut, Lebanon and at the University of California at Berkeley. His Stamford buildings were designed for F.D. Rich Co. (For information on Bisharat's buildings on High Ridge Road, see Arts and culture in Stamford, Connecticut.)

- Saint John's Towers -- The three cylindrical, 17-story towers were finished in 1971. One was demolished in 2019 to make way for a new residential development.
- One Landmark Square -- 22-story building completed in 1973 was the tallest building between New York and Boston from 1973 to 2008.
- One Stamford Forum -- Looking like an upside-down ziggurat above its three-story parking garage, the building has an enclosed arboretum rising from the ninth floor to the penthouse roof, which is covered by 76 acrylic glass domes. The 13-floor structure is 196 feet high and was completed in 1973 as the world headquarters for GTE Corporation. In the 1990s, the Tresser Boulevard entrance to the building was changed (in a design by Hellmuth, Obata & Kassabaum) from a "formidably stark concrete wall of a parking garage" to "a more inviting entrance ... clad in blue-gray ceramic tiles, with a lobby, canopy, colonnade and small garden". Currently, the building is the headquarters of Purdue Pharma and Aircastle Limited.
- Stamford Marriott Hotel & Spa -- The 16 floor, 305-room hotel was completed in 1976 and was the largest hotel in Connecticut at the time. The hotel was expanded to 505 rooms in 1986.

=== Other buildings ===
- One Atlantic Street -- Art Deco interiors, with murals in the ground-floor bank, and Art Deco exterior details as well. The red-brick/white marble building at the corner of Broad and Atlantic Streets was finished in 1931 and for a long time was the tallest in Stamford.
- University of Connecticut Campus -- The 225,000-square-foot (20,900 m^{2}) building with the vast, green glass facade at the corner of Washington and Broad Streets was designed by Perkins Eastman.
- Old Town Hall — The Beaux Arts building was built from 1905 to 1907 and served as the seat of local government until the early 1960s. The building opened for business on March 20, 1907. The last mayor to work there was J. Walter Kennedy, who moved to the Municipal Office Building that was on Atlantic Street (now torn down) in about 1961. The Old Town Hall held offices for the city government until all city offices were moved to 888 Washington Boulevard in 1987.
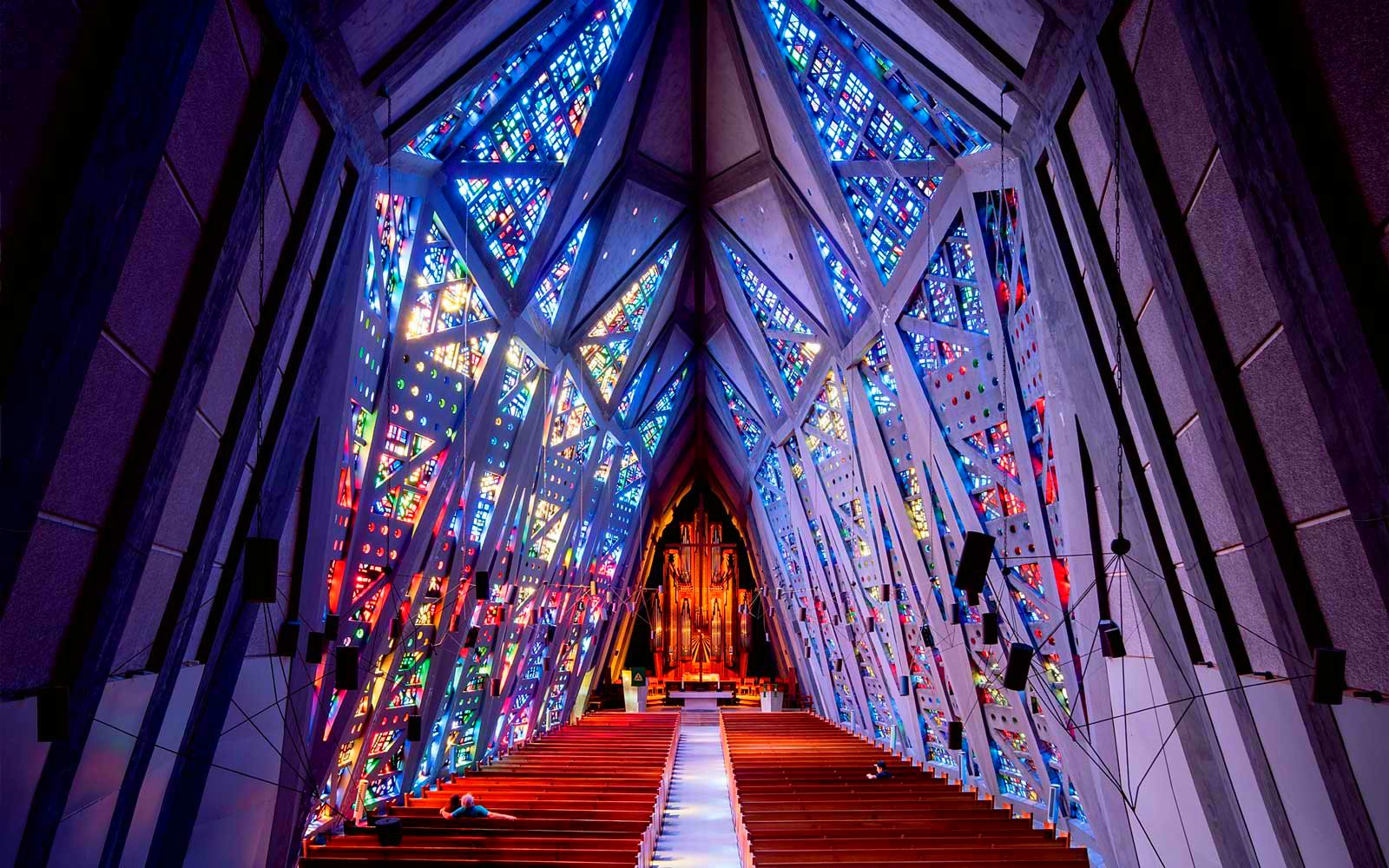
  Stained glass interior of the Fish Church.
- The "Fish Church", or the First Presbyterian Church of Stamford, was designed by Wallace K. Harrison, the chief architect of the United Nations buildings in New York City, and opened in 1958. The fish shape is obvious to anyone who drives by, but the floor plan is also fish-shaped. The stained glass windows in the sanctuary contain more than 20,000 pieces of faceted glass. They depict the story of the Crucifixion and the Resurrection. The 32-foot (9.8 m)-high cross is faced with wood from Canterbury Cathedral. "Brilliant blues, reds and yellows make up the walls -- and seem to fill the air. 'It really is like being inside a jewel,' says Reverend David R. Van Dyke, a co-pastor. 'When I bring people who haven't been here before, there's an audible gasp.'" (Life magazine, April 14, 2005) In March 1958, the $1.5 million church was dedicated with capacity crowds filling it for three services.
- Gurley Building (1924), also known as Valeur Building, an eight-story tall, narrow building at northwest corner of Main Street and Atlantic Street intersection (see photo #4). "Sullivanesque"; designed by Edward B. Stratton and built by Clinton Cruikshank.
- 133 Atlantic Street (c.1861, remodelled in 1935)
- Fidelity Title and Trust Company, 129 Atlantic Street. Built by Clinton Cruikshank.
- 119 Atlantic Street (1926), four-story, masonry
- Weed's Hall (1886), 109 Atlantic Street. Narrow five-story building, the only Stamford building with a cast iron facade.

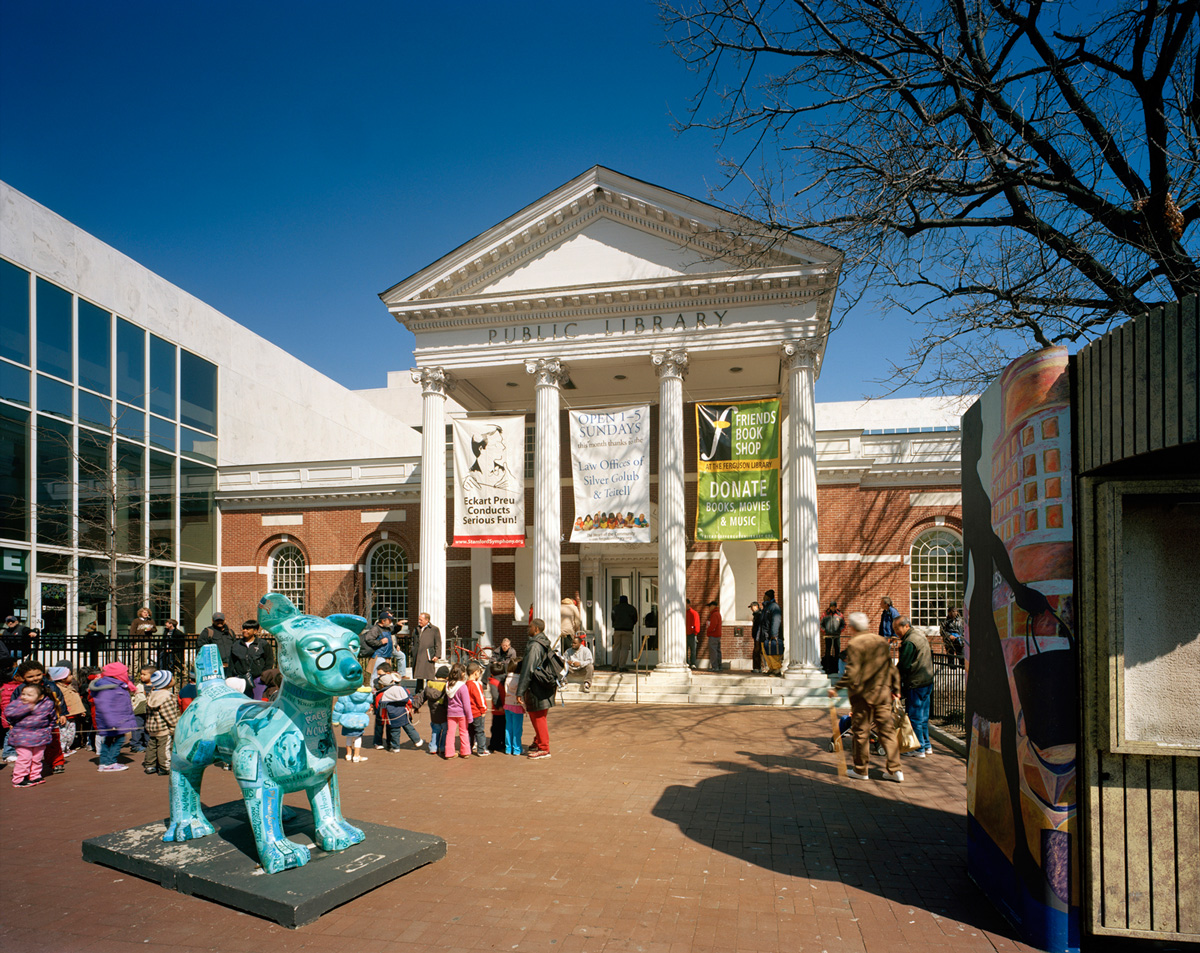
Ferguson Library

- Ferguson Library (1910), two-story Georgian Revival brick building. Designed by Egerton Swartwout. It had an addition built in 1931, to the rear, which was replaced and further enlarged in 1981.
- 15 Bedford Street (1932), Art Deco two-story commercial building. (see photo 6).
- Library Apartments, 65 Bedford Street (1930), three-story; second story "displays window spandrels with triglyph fluting". (see photo 8)

== Entertainment ==
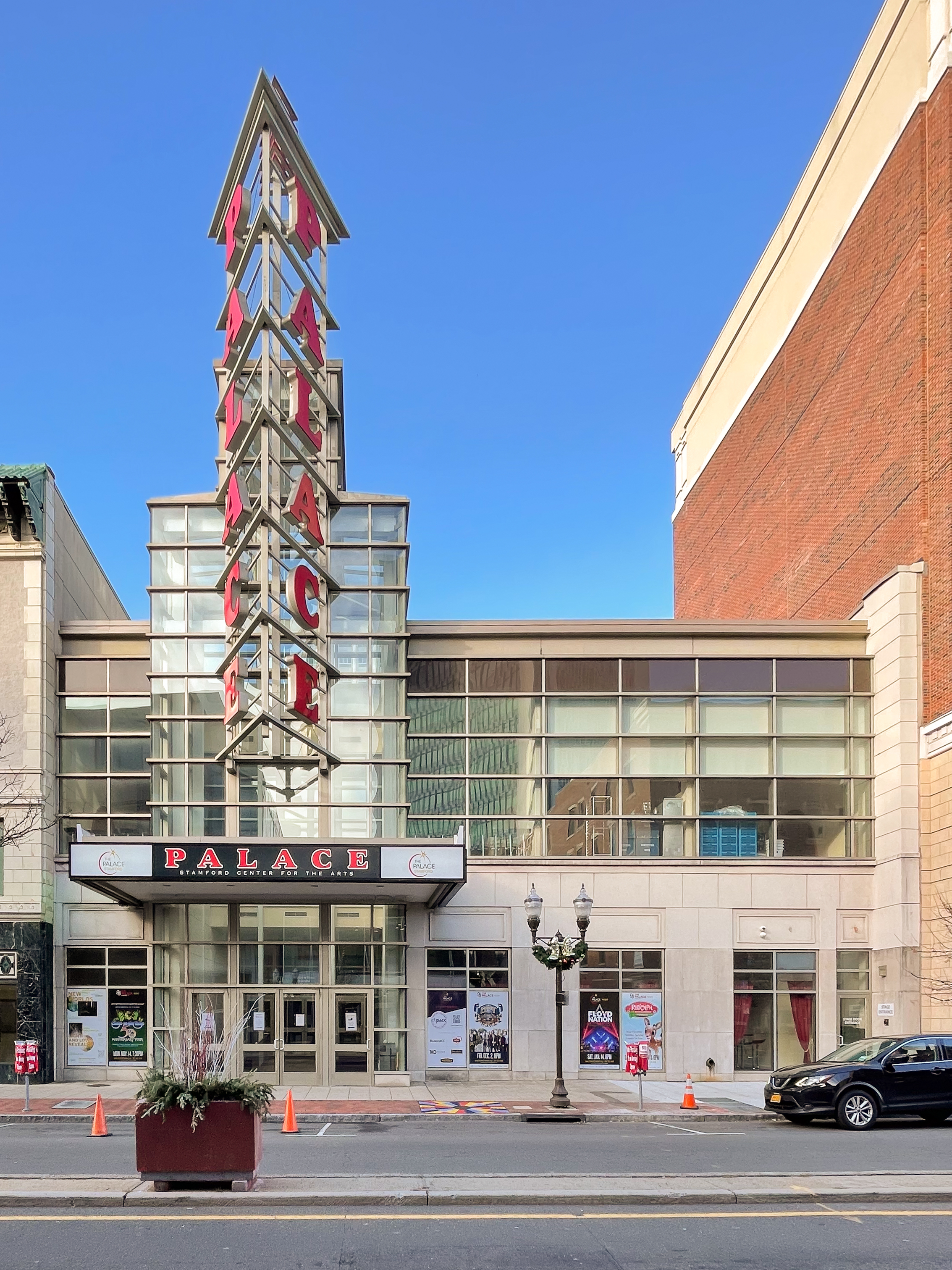
Palace Theatre (2022)

Most of Stamford's larger entertainment venues are located in the Downtown. These include the Palace Theatre, Rich Forum, and other movie theaters. The area around Columbus Park and Bedford Street has become a center for bars, clubs, and restaurants, although all three can be found elsewhere Downtown and around the city.

== Events ==
The Stamford Downtown Special Services District, known as Stamford Downtown, hosts yearlong events including a tour of a world-class sculpture exhibit, "Alive@Five" and "Wednesday Nite Live" outdoor concerts in Columbus Park, Arts & Crafts on Bedford Street and a giant helium balloon parade that marches through downtown which bring thousands of people into the downtown.

== Police and fire services ==
The main police station is located in the heart of Downtown, at 805 Bedford Street. A substation is located on Atlantic Street.

The Stamford Fire Rescue Department's Fire Station's # 1 and 5 serve the neighborhood. Fire Headquarters, or Fire Station # 1 is located on Main Street, in the heart of Downtown, while Fire Station # 5 is located on Washington Boulevard, in the Woodside neighborhood, just north of Downtown.

== Filming locations ==
- Almost all of Elia Kazan's 1947 film, Boomerang, was shot in Stamford and most of that in the downtown area. The Old Town Hall was used, particularly the old Police Department offices and the stairway leading up from them to the courtroom. For a scene in which a pastor was killed, the movie used the front and sidewalk of the Plaza Theatre, which stood on Greyrock Place (a driveway leading into the Stamford Town Center Mall is at that location now). The former offices of The Advocate, on Atlantic Street, were also used. "[I]t wasn't an oddity to run into Dana Andrews, one of the stars of the movie, in a local restaurant, or to see other stars on the street," according to Don Russell, a columnist for The Advocate.
- Part of Otto Preminger's 1963 film, The Cardinal, was shot in Saint John the Evangelist Roman Catholic Church on Atlantic Street. Some people stood for hours on the east side of Atlantic Street (across the street from the church) to get a glimpse of the stars.

== Gallery ==
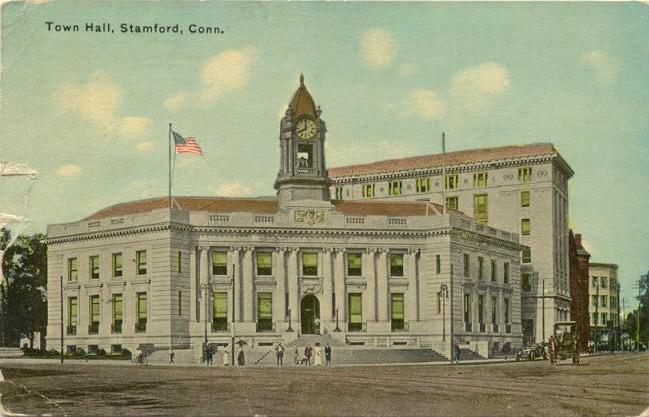
Town Hall, ca. 1914

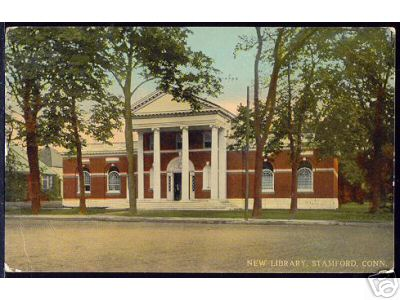
Ferguson Library, ca. 1912

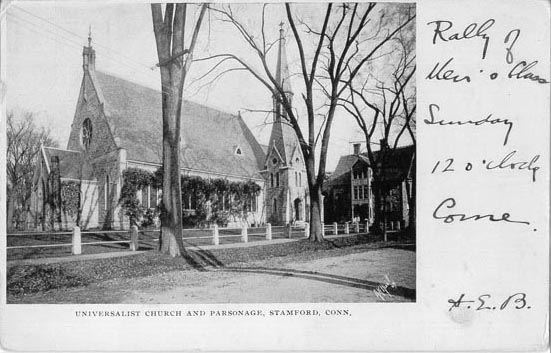
Universalist Church and parsonage, ca. 1905

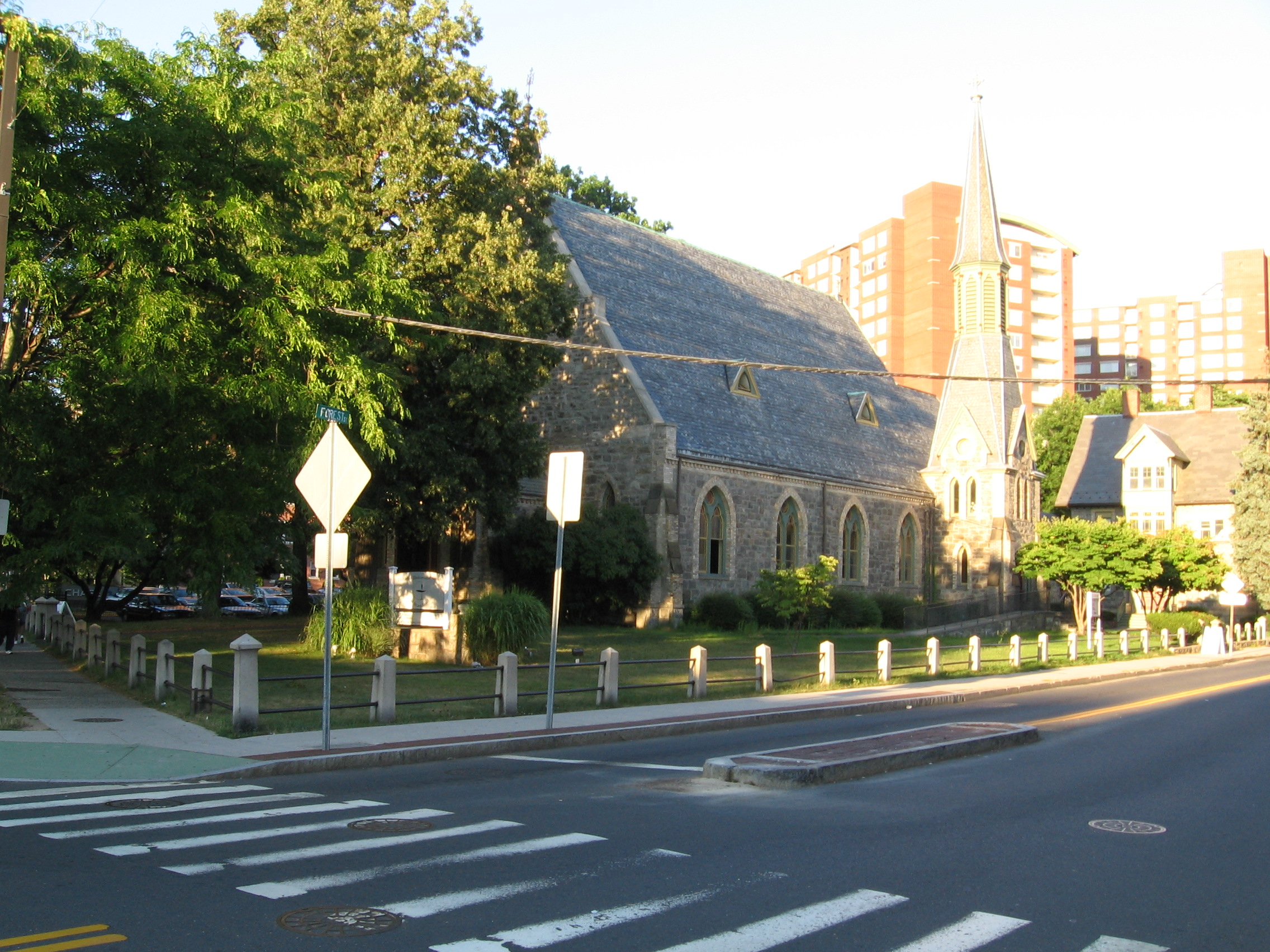
Same church and parsonage, 2007

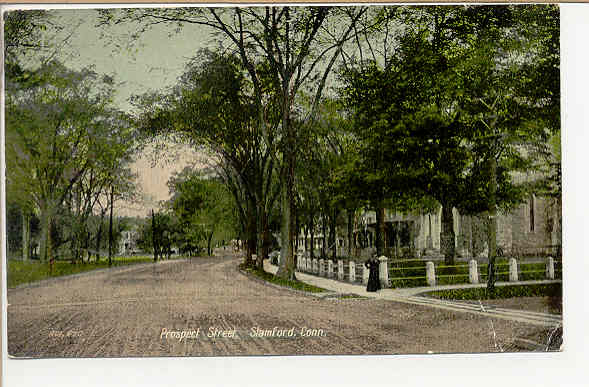
Prospect Street, ca. 1915

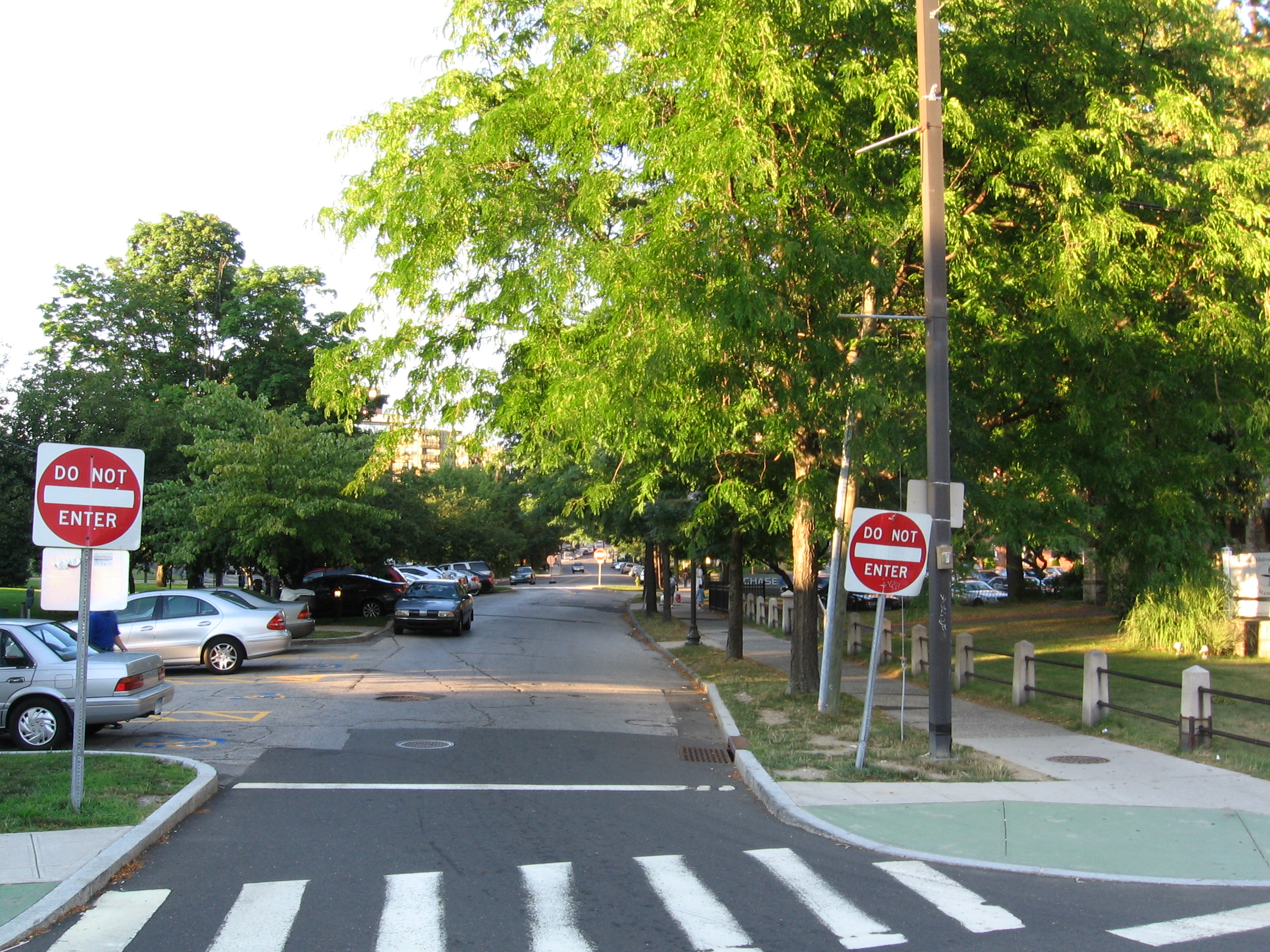
Prospect Street, same spot, 2007

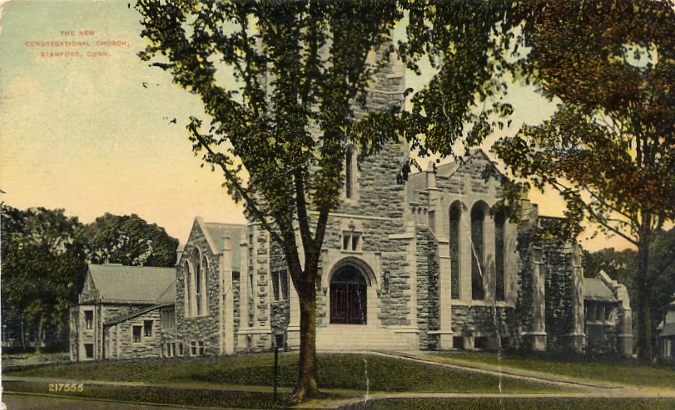
First Congregational Church, ca. 1913

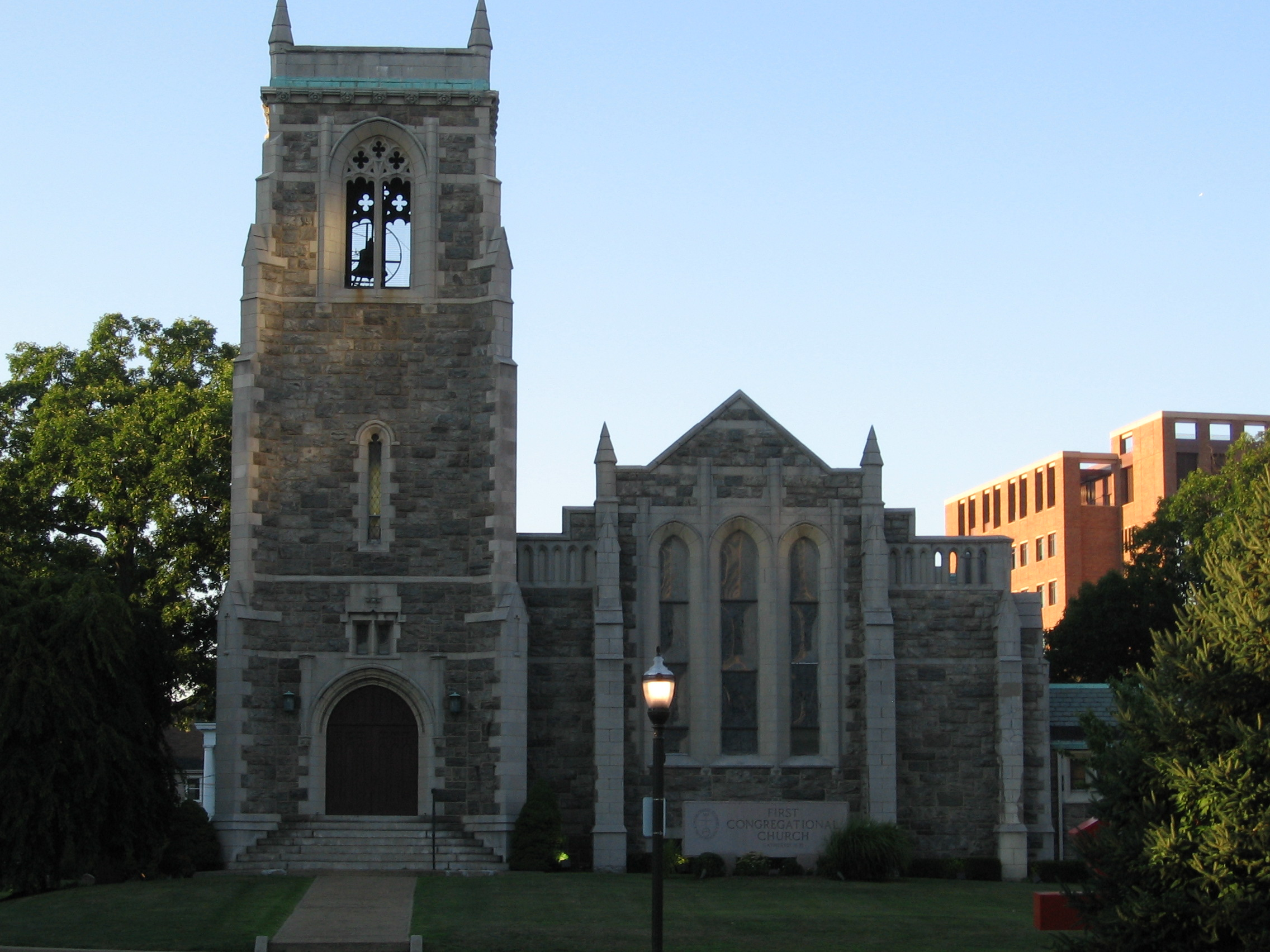
Same church in 2007

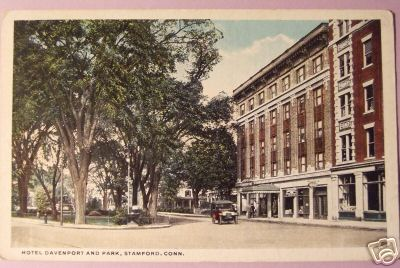
Hotel Davenport, from a postcard sent in 1916

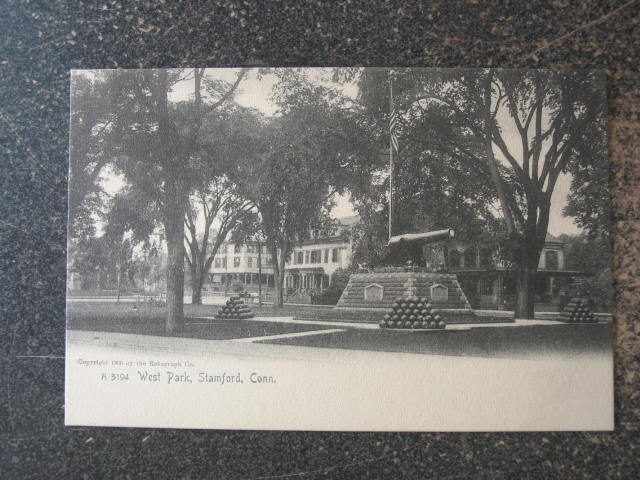
West Park, 1905

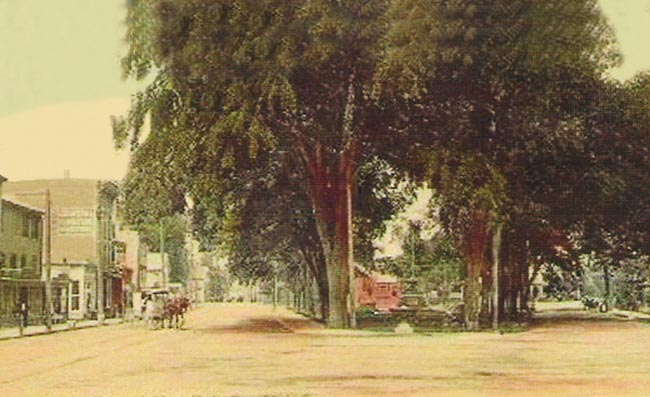
West Park, 1906

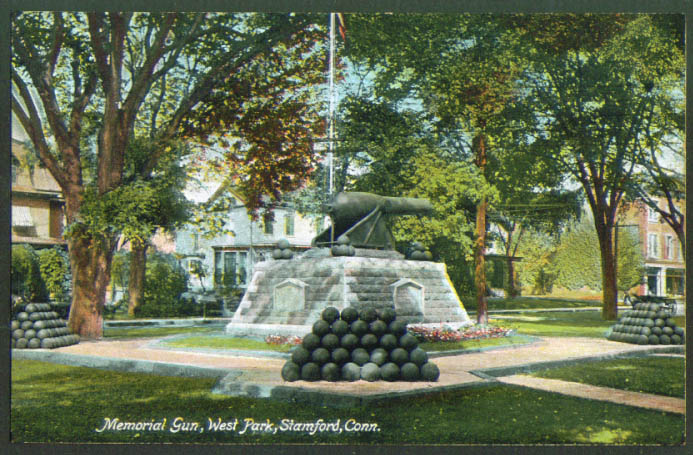
West Park, 1910

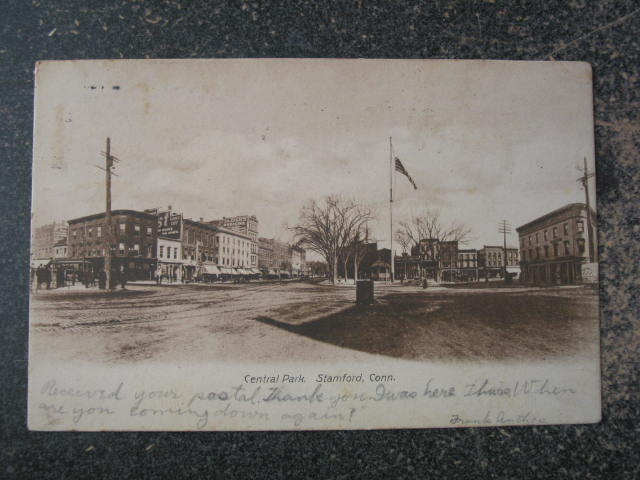
Central Park, circa 1910-1919

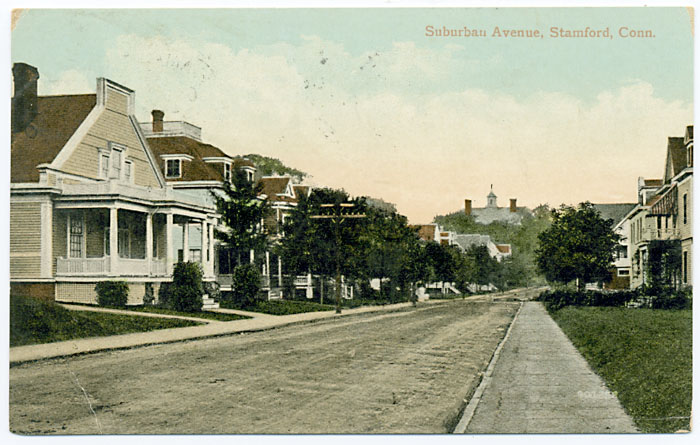
Suburban Avenue, circa 1908

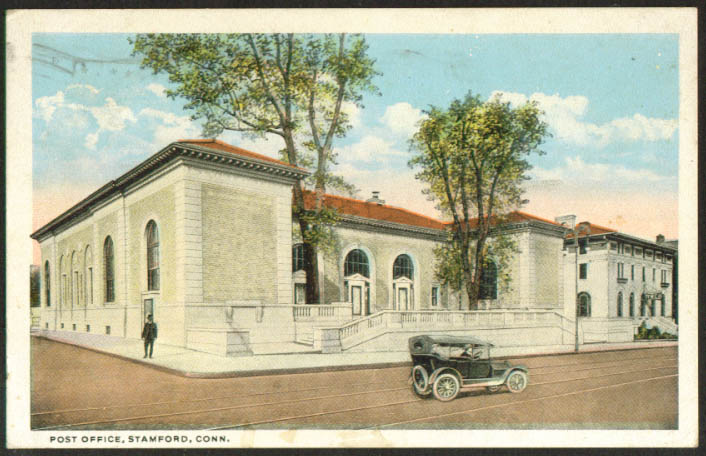
U.S. Post Office, circa 1911

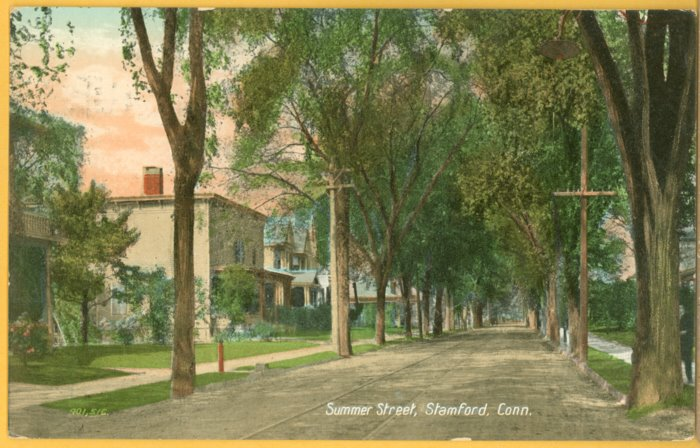
Summer Street, circa 1909

== See also ==
- National Register of Historic Places listings in Stamford, Connecticut
- Economy of Stamford, Connecticut
