= Highgrove =

Highgrove may refer to:

== Australia ==
- Highgrove, Queensland, a locality in the Toowoomba Region

== United Kingdom ==
- Highgrove House and estate, a royal residence in Gloucestershire
- Highgrove House, Eastcote, a Grade II listed mansion in Eastcote, within the London Borough of Hillingdon

== United States ==
- Highgrove, California, a US settlement
- Highgrove, Stamford, a residential apartment block in Connecticut
