= Old Town Hall (Stamford, Connecticut) =

- U.S. National Register of Historic Places
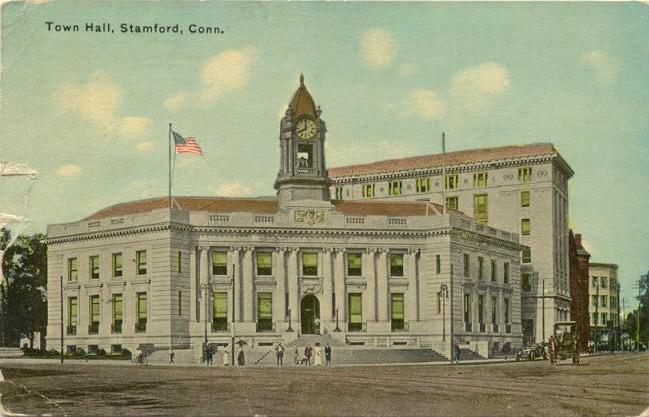
- Old Town Hall in 1914

- Location within Connecticut Location within the United States
- Location: Junction of Atlantic, Bank, and Main Streets, Stamford, Connecticut
- Coordinates: 41°3′11″N 73°32′26″W
- Area: less than one acre
- Built: 1905
- Architect: Mellon & Josselyn
- Architectural style: Beaux Arts
- NRHP reference No.: 72001304
- Added to NRHP: June 2, 1972

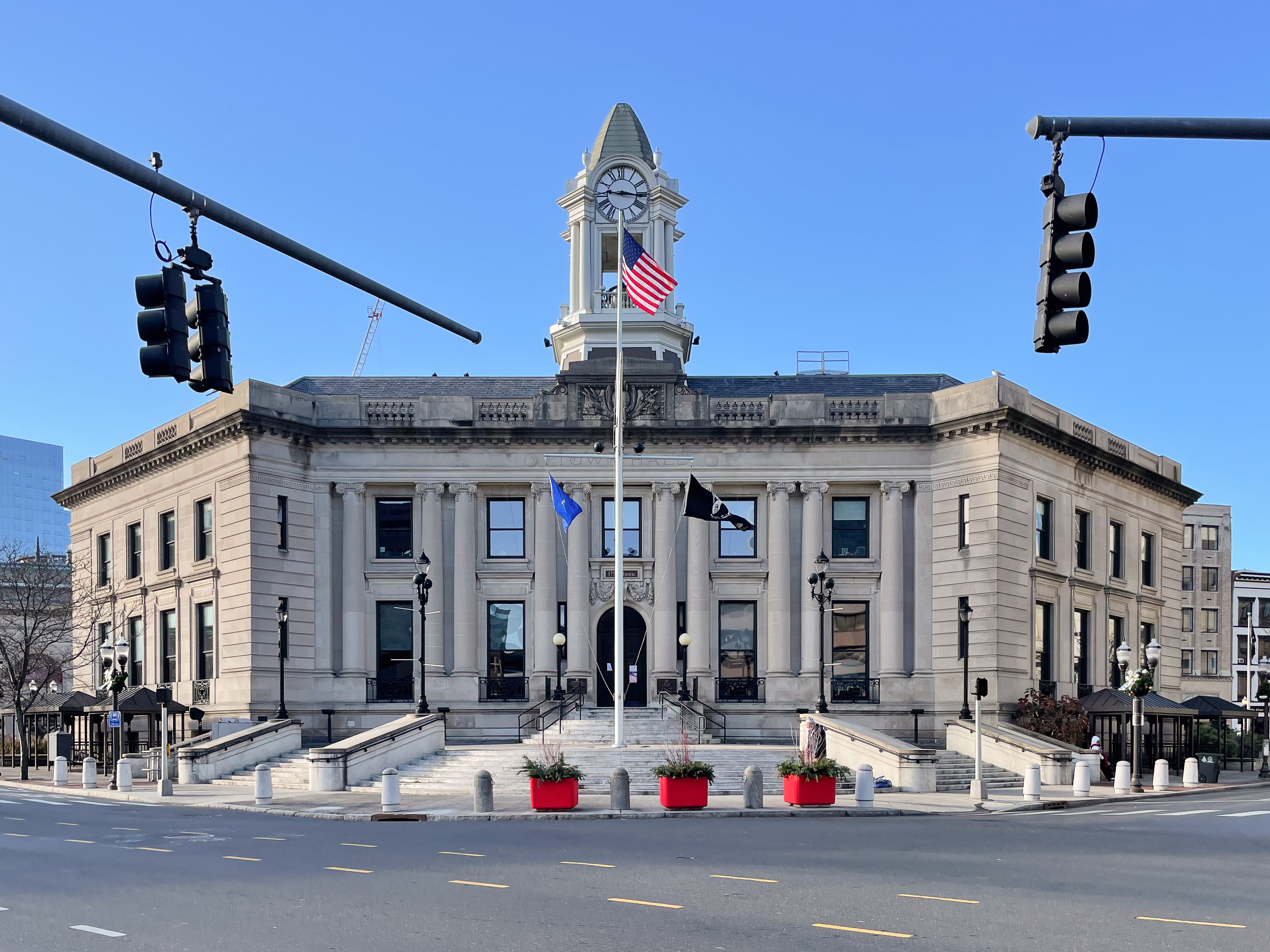
(2022)

The Old Town Hall is located in the Downtown section of Stamford, Connecticut. It is located at the southwest corner of Main and Atlantic Streets, occupying a portion of a triangular block bounded on the south by Bank Street. The rest of the block is occupied by the modern portion of Stamford's city hall. The building is an elegant Beaux Arts structure, designed by the New York City architectural firm of Mellon and Jossely; it was designed in 1905.

== Description ==
The Old Town Hall has five levels across three stories. Designed in the Beaux-Arts style, it is known for its architecture grandeur. It has a limestone facade with a clock tower. Notable interior design elements include oak trim, terrazzo flooring, decorative plasterwork, dual staircases with iron railwork, and murals in some rooms.

The building is located at the intersection of Atlantic, Bank and Main streets. It sits close to the Stamford Town Center shopping mall, as well as Veterans Memorial Park.

== History ==
An earlier Stamford Town Hall had been constructed in 1871 and destroyed in a fire in 1904. To replace it, the City of Stamford (which then had about 19,000 inhabitants) commissioned a new town hall, designed by architects Edgar Josselyn and Nathan Mellen. Designed in 1905, the building opened in 1906.

In the post-war era, the growing city began to outgrow the building, and city agencies and offices began to leave the building for other structures. It ceased to be the seat of city government in 1963. In the 1980s it was abandoned. Although the building was listed on the National Register of Historic Places on June 2, 1972, it remained unused for 25 years. Various adaptive reuse and redevelopment proposals were considered, but did not come to fruition. These included proposals in the late 1980s to turn the Old Town Hall into an arts center (the Hartford Atheneum declined an opportunity to establish the Old Town Hall as a branch museum) and proposals in the late 1990s to develop a 13-story hotel atop the Old Town Hall.

In 2001, the city began a renovation project, partly funded by state grants. The City of Stamford established the Old Town Hall Redevelopment Agency in 2006 to oversee three limited-liability corporations to whom ownership of the building was transferred as part of the project. The renovation was completed in 2010. The cost of the renovation, has been variously cited at $16 million or $20 million. This redevelopment agency operated independently from the city, and was dissolved in 2015, in anticipation of the City's resumption of management of the Old Town Hall.

In 2012, after the renovation, the Stamford Innovation Center opened in the building. The initiative, a public-private partnership sponsored by Sikorsky Aircraft, entered into a ten-year lease agreement for space in the building. As of 2015, the building has two tenants. In 2023, the city opened its Stamford Veterans Resource Center on the second floor of the Old Town Hall.

== See also ==
- National Register of Historic Places listings in Fairfield County, Connecticut
