= One Landmark Square =

Building in Stamford, Connecticut, US

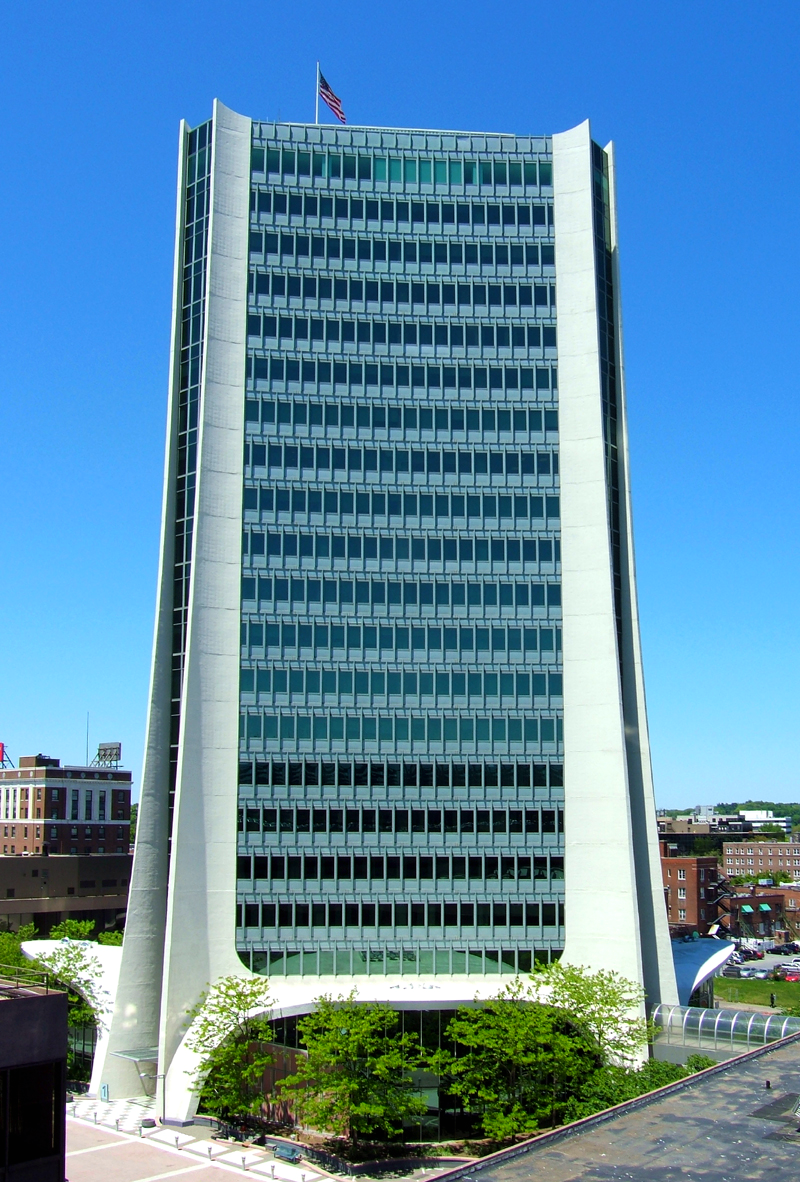
- One Landmark Square in Stamford, Connecticut
- Interactive map of the One Landmark Square area

General information
- Architectural style: Neo-Futurism
- Location: 1 Landmark Square; Stamford, Connecticut
- Coordinates: 41.054700°N 73.538015°W
- Construction started: 1970
- Completed: 1973
- Cost: US$35,000,000 (equivalent to $253,841,829 in 2025)
- Owner: SL Green Realty

Height
- Roof: 295 ft (90 m)

Technical details
- Floor count: 22
- Floor area: 300,000 ft^{2} (28,000 m^{2})
- Lifts/elevators: 7

Design and construction
- Architect: Victor H. Bisharat
- Developer: F. D. Rich Company

One Landmark Square, also known as Landmark Tower, or simply Landmark, is a 22-story, 295 ft (90 m) skyscraper located at One Landmark Square in Stamford, Connecticut. It is currently the third tallest building in Stamford, after Park Tower Stamford and Atlantic Station, and from 1970 to 1990 was the tallest building on the coast between New York City and Boston. It is currently the tallest office tower in Stamford. One Landmark Square was designed by American architect Victor Hanna Bisharat, who designed many other buildings in Downtown Stamford during the city's urban renewal efforts in the 1970s and 1980s.

Bisharat designed the building after his own aesthetic preferences. It has been described as an imposing tower with a swooping form and scalloped-shaped entrances, and has been compared to the TWA Flight Center, designed by Eero Saarinen, and the Cathedral of Brasília, designed by Oscar Niemeyer.

== History ==
In 1960, F. D. Rich Company successfully gained control of the Stamford downtown urban renewal project, which was estimated to cost over $250 million. The original project plan included 14 office buildings known as Stamford Forum, three moderate-income housing developments, and a luxury hotel. Landmark Tower was planned as the centerpiece of the entire 118-acre renewal area, as designed by Bisharat. Bisharat said Robert Rich, then co-owner of F. D. Rich, accepted his design for Landmark Tower when he watched Bisharat.

Lawsuits against the city and the Urban Redevelopment Commission regarding inadequate relocation housing following the use of eminent domain caused 8 years of delays to Rich's construction downtown, including Landmark Tower. This delay allowed the Rich to construct Bisharat's other buildings at High Ridge Park off the Merritt Parkway in North Stamford. Construction of Landmark finally began in 1970, almost 10 years after receiving initial approval for the project, and was completed three years later in 1973.

In the 1970s, Landmark featured a large ice-skating rink at the corner of Atlantic and Broad Streets, a penthouse restaurant called the "Landmark Club", and art from the Whitney Museum's Stamford Branch. Five other buildings were built around Landmark Tower, in the mid-1970s to the early 1980s, to form Landmark Square. Landmark buildings 2 thru 6 were designed by architect Moshe Safdie and were constructed by F. D. Rich Company.

By the late-80s, the Rich Company was feeling the impacts of the late 1980s recession as major companies merged, moved, and laid off workers. Numerous other buildings were built in the declining market in order to maintain their contract with the Stamford Urban Redevelopment Commission and make construction deadlines. The losses due to overbuilding were insurmountable for F. D. Rich Company and several of the Rich Company's properties, including Landmark Tower and many other office buildings, were surrendered to a variety of lenders in “deed in lieu of foreclosure” transactions. The entire Landmark Square complex was deeded to the Metropolitan Life Insurance Company in 1991.

== Recent years ==
Since 1992, Stamford Downtown has presented Heights & Lights which features Santa Claus rappelling down the side of the 22-story Landmark Tower, a holiday tree lighting, live music, and a fireworks show. Rappelling Santas have included the general manager of the New York Yankees, Brian Cashman, and professional baseball player and manager Bobby Valentine.

Official logo for the City of Stamford featuring Landmark Tower, and One Stamford Forum

In 1996, Reckson Associates Realty purchased the entire six-building Landmark Square complex, including Landmark Tower, from Metropolitan Life Insurance for US$77 million. Over the next few years, Reckson invested another US$50 million to restore the complex and bring it "into the 21st century". Improvements included replacing hundreds of windows with energy efficient glass, renovating the lobbies, restrooms and elevators, adding new landscaping to the complex's two plazas, constructing an onsite cafe with indoor seating, and adding a New York Sports Club on-site. Reckson was later acquired by SL Green Realty in 2006 for US$4 billion.

In 2005, the area that was once the ice rink was cleared to improve pedestrian access to Landmark Square and add ground floor retail. This new retail building was completed in 2006 and includes a large restaurant space and multiple retail outlets. Tenants in the new retail building include HSBC Bank and Blackstones Steakhouse.

Since 2017, the City of Stamford has featured Landmark Tower in their official logo along with One Stamford Forum, another urban renewal building.

== Major tenants ==
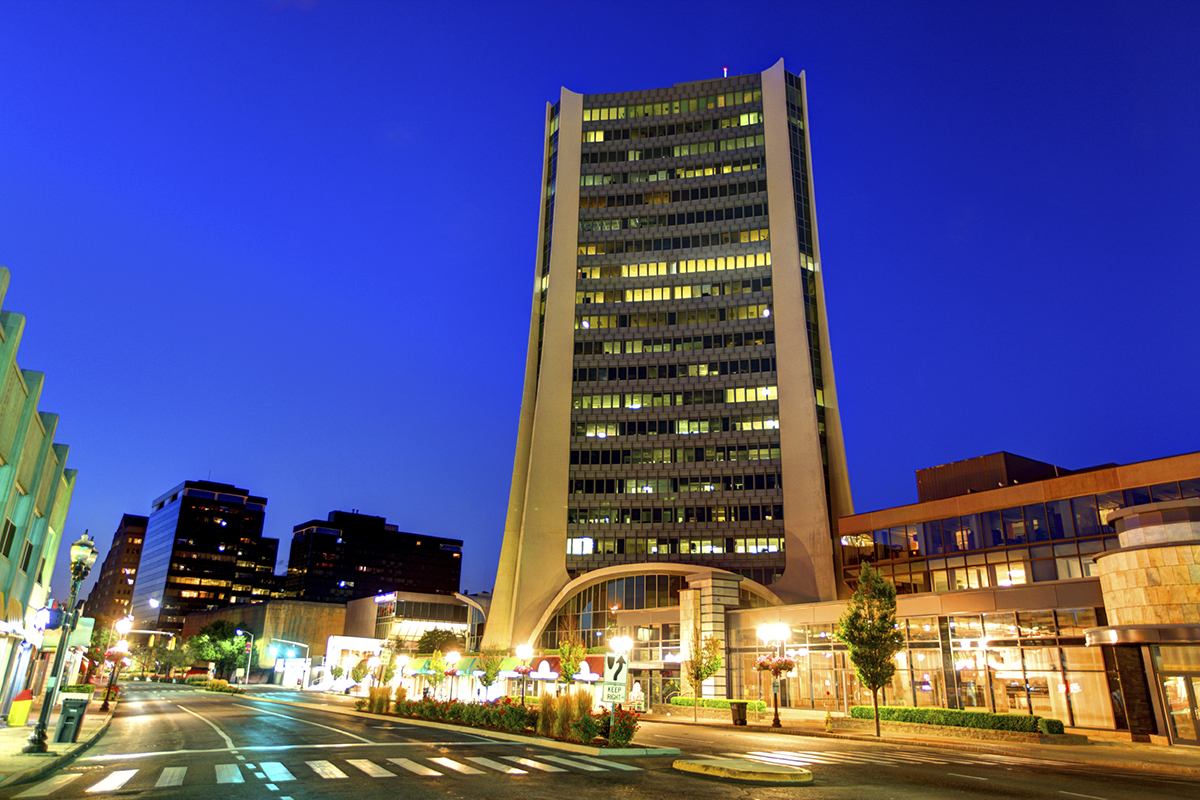
Landmark Tower at One Landmark Square at night

=== Current ===
- Centerplate
- Everest Reinsurance Group
- Tokio Millennium Re.
- Epstein, Becker & Green
- Land & Buildings
- Reckson/SLGreen Realty
- PASSUR Aerospace
- Green Street Power Partners
- GarMark Partners
- Fitzpatrick & Hunt, Pagano, Aubert

=== Former ===
- Diageo North America
- AON
- Heineken USA
- McKinsey & Company
- Touche Ross Inc.
- Loxo Oncology
- Environics
- Fox Rothschild
- Fleet National Bank
- PrimeEnergy Corporation
- F. D. Rich Company
- Nippon Magnetics USA
- Amenta Emma Architects
- Clarus Corporation
