= Highgrove, Stamford =

High-rise building in Stamford, Connecticut, United States

Highgrove
- Highgrover at night in 2010
- Interactive map of the Highgrove area

General information
- Type: High-Rise
- Location: Downtown Stamford, 70 Forest Street, Stamford, CT
- Coordinates: 41°3′40″N 73°32′08″W
- Construction started: September 2007
- Completed: 2010
- Owner: ST Residential

Technical details
- Floor count: 18

Design and construction
- Architect: Robert A.M. Stern
- Structural engineer: DeSimone Consulting Engineers
- Main contractor: Hunter Roberts

Website
- www.highgrovestamford.com

Highgrove is an 18-story luxury high-rise in Stamford, Connecticut. Designed by Robert A.M. Stern, the Dean of Architecture at Yale University, Highgrove consists of 92 residences. Highgrove is located on Forest and Grove Street in Downtown Stamford.

== Developer woes ==
In September 2009, prior to the completion of the Highgrove, its developer was sued by Florida's Attorney General for failure to complete another condominium project in Palm Beach, Florida.
