= Park Tower Stamford =

Skyscraper in Connecticut

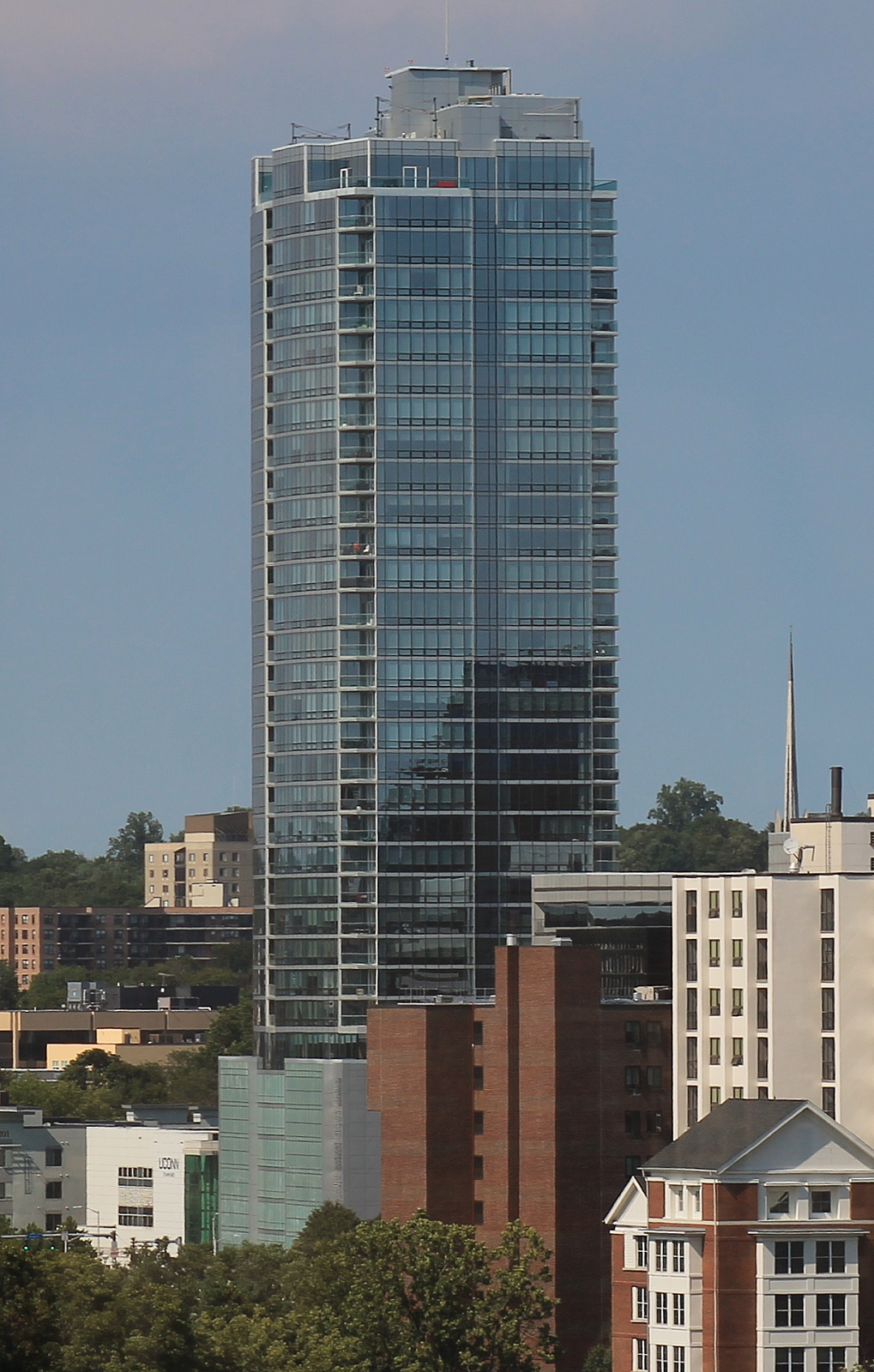
- Park Tower Stamford in 2017

General information
- Status: Completed
- Type: Condominiums
- Location: 1 Broad Street, Stamford, Connecticut, United States
- Coordinates: 41.055363°N 73.542898°W
- Groundbreaking: May 15, 2007
- Opened: September 2009
- Cost: $160 million (2007 estimate)

Height
- Height: 350 ft (110 m)
- Tip: 390 feet (119 m)

Technical details
- Floor count: 36

Design and construction
- Architecture firm: Costas Kondylis; Lessard Design Inc.
- Developer: Donald Trump; Thomas Rich; Louis R. Cappelli
- Main contractor: George A. Fuller Company

Other information
- Number of units: 170

Website
- www.akam.com

Park Tower Stamford (formerly known as Trump Parc Stamford, and temporarily as Parc Stamford) is a 36-story condominium property located at 1 Broad Street in Stamford, Connecticut. Real estate developers Thomas Rich and Louis R. Cappelli began planning the project as Park Tower in February 2006; it was renamed as Trump Parc Stamford later that year, after Donald Trump joined the project, and again renamed Park Tower Stamford.

Trump Parc was initially rejected by the city, as it was considered too large for its 0.5-acre (0.20 ha) site. A revised, smaller version of the project was approved in November 2006, and a groundbreaking ceremony was held in May 2007. Construction was delayed twice in 2008, after several construction incidents. The building finally opened in September 2009 as the tallest building in Stamford.

== History ==
=== Early history and design ===
In February 2006, developers Thomas Rich and Louis R. Cappelli proposed Park Tower, a 37-story condominium tower that would stand 425 feet. The glass structure, designed by Costas Kondylis and Lessard Design Inc., would be built on 0.5 acres (0.20 ha) at the southeast corner of Broad Street and Washington Boulevard in Stamford, Connecticut. Park Tower, if built, would become the tallest building in Stamford, surpassing the city's Landmark Tower; it would also be the fifth tallest building in Connecticut.

Rich, the president of Stamford's F. D. Rich Company, owned the half-acre property as part of a 2.7-acre (1.1 ha) parcel that was jointly owned by an adjacent Target store, which opened in October 2004. Since 1980, approximately 15 earlier projects had been proposed for the 2.7-acre property, including a hotel. Prior to the Target purchase, the property had been owned entirely by 33 Broad Street Associates, a partnership of Rich and Robert Kahn. After the Target store opened, Rich and Kahn began planning for development on the half-acre lot. Although the half-acre site was currently landscaped with trees and park benches, Rich stated that he had always intended to develop the property.

Cappelli subsequently purchased Kahn's interest in the property. Cappelli was well known for his building projects in Westchester County, New York, and had previously worked with Donald Trump on the Trump Tower at City Center and Trump Plaza condominium projects, both in New York. In March 2006, Trump was in discussions to join the project, which was to include 185 condominium units. In May 2006, the project – now known as Trump Parc – received approval from the local planning board despite being 70 feet taller than what current regulations allowed: 330 feet. Although the building would stand 425 feet tall, zoning regulations meant that the building was only officially considered to be 400 feet tall.

After approval from the planning board, residents expressed concerns that the new building would "Manhattanize" the city and cast shadows over the nearby Mill River Park. Stamford mayor Dannel Malloy was supportive of the additional 70 feet requested for the tower, but was skeptical about the location chosen for the project. During a Zoning Board meeting on June 12, 2006, discussions about whether to approve the project were abruptly ended after one member recused himself because of a potential conflict of interest, as he owned a mixed-use building near the proposed project.

By mid-June 2006, a traffic study had been conducted to determine whether the project would significantly affect traffic. Later that month, Rich and Cappelli insisted that the tower be built as high as deemed necessary, in order to produce a profit. It was subsequently reported that executives of F. D. Rich Company and Cappelli Enterprises had donated $26,000 to Malloy's campaign in the 2006 Connecticut governor election. Thomas Rich stated that the donations were unrelated to the project.

By June 24, 2006, the developers submitted revised plans for the project to make it less obtrusive. On June 26, 2006, the Zoning Board unanimously rejected the Trump Parc Stamford project; although they praised its design, they believed it was too large for the half-acre site. Rich and Cappelli began considering their options for the site.

In September 2006, revised plans by Costas Kondylis and Lessard Design were revealed for Trump Parc that would reduce its height by 50 feet, down to 350 feet; the building would be reduced from 37 stories to 34. Other changes included some parking spaces being relocated underground, while an above-ground parking garage was reduced from five stories to four. The redesign consisted of 177 units, rather than 184. The Zoning Board approved the revised project in November 2006. It was estimated that $18 million to $24 million was lost because of the redesign, as an additional six penthouses could have been built in the floors that were removed from the final design.

=== Construction and delays ===
In March 2007, Thomas Rich announced that construction would begin by July. A groundbreaking ceremony was held on May 15, 2007. Trump, former MSNBC anchor Rita Cosby and lawyer Mickey Sherman were among more than 125 people who attended the event, at which Cosby served as emcee. Trump, Malloy, and state lieutenant governor Michael Fedele gave speeches during the event. Condominium units went on sale the same day, with the opening of a sales office and model condominium unit inside the neighboring Target store. Actual construction could not begin until a building permit was issued for the foundation; it was believed that construction could begin as soon as early June 2007. The project was expected to cost $160 million, including $150 million in financing from the Bank of Scotland. The project's general contractor was George A. Fuller Company. Trump Parc was expected to become the first LEED-certified building in Connecticut.

In early August 2007, the trees located on the property were removed and donated to local parks, allowing for the start of the building's foundation. In September 2007, scenes were shot outside Trump Parc and inside its model apartments for the film Righteous Kill. By that time, 27 units had been sold in the project. By January 2008, Vince McMahon purchased one of the project's penthouses. In February 2008, construction had reached the fourth floor, while 42 units had been sold up to that time.

In May 2008, a 10-pound piece of metal plunged 25 floors from the building during construction and tore through a water delivery truck, striking the driver in the right shoulder and leaving minor injuries. The following month, a three-foot-long piece of cable fell from the 29th floor and crushed the roof of a car below, but did not result in any injuries. Construction was halted for the weekend so workers could undergo a safety training session.

In July 2008, a round metal object, approximately three inches long, fell from a building and crashed through a window at the University of Connecticut at Stamford, located across the street. While no one was injured, city officials halted construction again that day after discovering that adequate safety measures had not been taken. City officials planned to appoint an onsite inspector to monitor the future progress of the project. Construction resumed on July 31, 2008.

On August 2, 2008, a four-by-four piece of wood fell from the building and crashed through the roof of a postal truck. The university subsequently closed its main entrance to protect students. While Cappelli called the incident "inexcusable," he noted that weather may have been a factor: "You had a perfectly beautiful summer day that turned into a 50-mph wind gust." On August 6, 2008, city officials agreed to have a covered walkway constructed to protect students and other pedestrians, while also planning to put up signs directing students away from the construction site.

=== Opening and operation ===
The first sales for units in the building were finalized on September 18, 2009, while the first tenants began moving in over the next two days. Other new residents were expected to move in over the following few months. The lowest floors were to be occupied first. The project featured 170 units, of which 70 were under contract. Two of the project's six penthouses had been sold up to that time. Amenities included a 24-hour concierge desk, a billiards room, a gym, a lounge, a pool, and a rooftop deck. The ground floor featured a 3,500 sq ft (330 m^{2}) area designed to accommodate a restaurant and bar, but a tenant had yet to occupy the space. The structure, made of glass, was the tallest building in Stamford at the time of its opening, standing 350 feet with 34 floors.

Because of a poor economy, Rich chose to heavily market the property ahead of its opening, and also reduced prices by more than 15 percent on select units, with starting prices at $650,000. Promotional advertisements were mailed to 30,000 Manhattan apartment residents. Advertisements were also put in local newspapers, appeared on Metro-North Railroad trains, and were aired on New York's WCBS radio station.

In October 2009, Vince and Linda McMahon purchased a 3,900 sq ft (360 m^{2}) penthouse duplex at Trump Parc Stamford for $4.1 million. It was the only other penthouse to have been sold up to that time. McMahon was also a member of the condominium board. In 2009 and 2010, a stair-climbing charity competition was organized by the American Lung Association and was held at Trump Parc Stamford, where people raced to the top floor. Actress Essence Atkins became a resident in 2010.

=== Proposed renaming ===
In December 2015, during his presidential campaign, Trump called for a temporary ban on Muslims entering the United States. A coalition of Muslim groups in Stamford subsequently urged F. D. Rich Company to remove Trump's name from the Trump Parc building, writing to the company, "It is highly offensive to Fairfield County's diverse multi-ethnic community to have a well-known building carry the name of someone who has made a wide variety of xenophobic statements."

Thomas Rich stated that he was unable to rename the building as ownership of the condominiums was transferred to purchasers two years earlier. Rich said that the building was managed by Trump's company, The Trump Organization, and that Trump Parc "has a wide cross section of resident owners that represent a variety of races, religious backgrounds and political affiliations." Rich also said that renaming the building would be difficult as it was 90 percent sold.

Linda McMahon declined to comment on the proposed renaming, while a spokesperson for the building wrote, "The Homeowners Association of Trump Parc Stamford is aware of the current situation but is not in a position to make a public statement at this time." Malloy, who by that time was now the governor of Connecticut, called on Trump to waive any financial penalties that would be imposed on people who remove his name from their properties. The building retained its name for the time being.

In December 2020, The Trump Organization ended its contract with the property. A name change became official on February 16, 2021, when the seven-member condo board voted unanimously to remove Trump's name from the property. Trump's involvement in the 2021 storming of the United States Capitol was a factor for the name change. While a new name was being decided, the property temporarily bore the name "Parc Stamford," having simply dropped "Trump" from the name. On July 26, 2021, the condo board formally announced that "Park Tower Stamford" would be the building's new official name and that AKAM had been contracted as the new property management company.

== See also ==
- List of tallest buildings in Connecticut
