= Mill River Park =

Park in Stamford, Connecticut, US

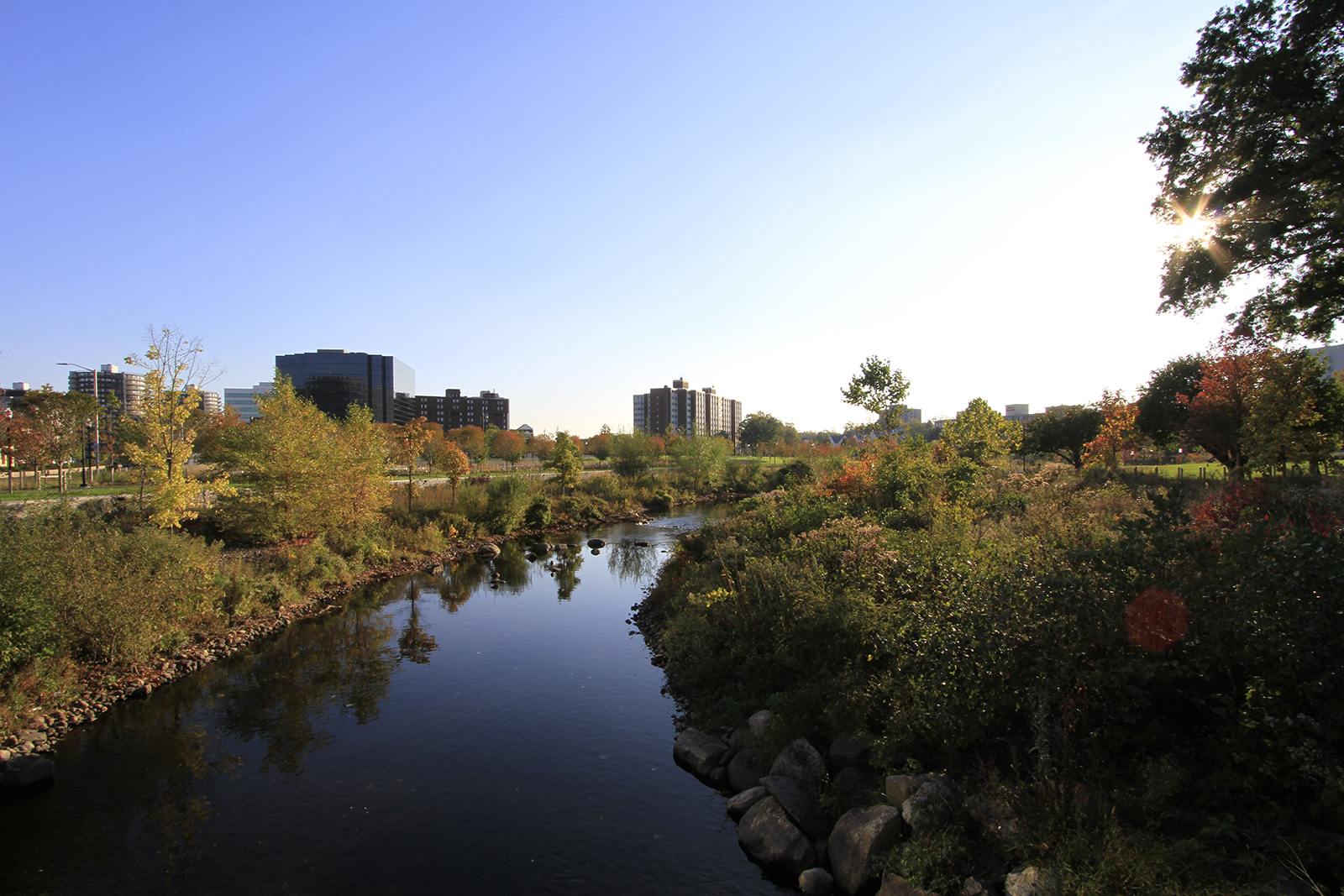
- Interactive map of Mill River Park
- Type: Urban park
- Location: Stamford, Connecticut
- Coordinates: 41°03′17″N 73°32′44″W
- Created: 2013
- Operator: Mill River Collaborative

Mill River Park is a 23-acre urban park located in downtown Stamford, Connecticut. The park, which separates Downtown from the West Side, features a restored section of the Mill River, extensive landscaping, and various recreational amenities. It is the result of a long-term redevelopment project aimed at reclaiming green space and improving the ecological health of the area. The park's development began in 1998 with a preliminary study by Sasaki Associates, resulting in the Mill River Corridor Plan to reclaim 26 acres of green space in downtown Stamford. In 2000, the U.S. Army Corps of Engineers endorsed the removal of the Mill River Dam to restore wetland habitat and improve public access to the river. The Mill River Park Collaborative, a non-profit organization, was founded in 2003 to lead the creation, growth, and operations of the new park.

The park officially opened to the public in May 2013, featuring the largest cherry tree grove in New England. Since then, it has continued to evolve with the addition of new amenities, including a carousel in 2017, an ice skating rink and fountain in 2018, and the Whittingham Discovery Center, an environmental education facility, in 2022.

== History ==
The park's history began in 1998, when landscape architecture firm Sasaki Associates was commissioned to draft a plan to reclaim the area along a segment of the Rippowam River known as Mill River as a public park.

In July 2007, the city government of Stamford released a master plan for the redevelopment of the area. The plan entailed three stages: the first stage, where the U.S. Army Corps of Engineers would remove a dam along the river and decrease the river's floodplain, a second stage for the construction of programming elements and walkways, and a third stage for additional amenities. The width of the Mill River was to be narrowed to less than half of its then-expanse, which would expand the park's area and provide space for more amenities. The master plan outlined the construction of a carousel, fountain, ice rink, and a network of trails connecting a greenway with the Kosciuszko, Southfield, and Scalzi parks. Removing the dam will also allow fish to swim up from Long Island Sound. As of 2007, the U.S. Army Corps of Engineers had spent $800,000 on preliminary studies, planning, and design.

In 2009, an $8 million restoration of the Mill River, $5 million of which was federally funded, began. It was followed by a second $12-million phase, which consisted primarily of installing infrastructure such as lighting, benches, and plantings.

Mill River Park was expanded in an $8.5 million project, including $4 million in federal funding earmarked in 2007, with the city government financing the rest of the cost. The federal funding was to pay for removing the Mill River dam and dredging.

As of 2013, the master plan for Mill River Park is projected to cost $60 million and to encompass 28 acres.

12 acres of the Mill River Park opened in May 2013.

In 2017, the park inaugurated the indoor carousel, and the ice skating rink and fountain were added in 2018.

The Whittingham Discovery Center, a building for educational programming described by the Stamford Advocate as "part museum, part-classroom, part community space", opened in June 2022.

== Notable flora and fauna ==
The Mill River Park was formerly home to a grove of cherry trees, which were presented to the city on April 27, 1957, by Junzo Nojima, a native of Japan who had settled in the city in 1926, and in 1932 became the first Japanese man to own a restaurant in the state (K&J Three Decker Restaurant on Atlantic Street). Nojima gave the city 120 trees, and for three years he watered each one until they took root. He gave the city instructions on how to care for them, but when they were overlooked, he began tending the trees himself. On Arbor Day, April 27, 2007, the city celebrated the 50th anniversary of the gift with a ceremony at the park. The cherry trees were removed in March 2009, as part of the renovations in the park's construction, but seeds from a select few were transferred to a nursery, and were planted in the fall of 2012.
