= National Register of Historic Places listings in Stamford, Connecticut =

This is a list of the properties and historic districts in Stamford, Connecticut that are listed on the National Register of Historic Places. The locations of National Register properties and districts for which the latitude and longitude coordinates are included below, may be seen in an online map.

This list includes 36 properties that are entirely or partially in Stamford, one of which is also a National Historic Landmark. Other Fairfield County properties are covered in National Register of Historic Places listings in Bridgeport, Connecticut, National Register of Historic Places listings in Greenwich, Connecticut and National Register of Historic Places listings in Fairfield County, Connecticut.

Twelve church complexes, with 26 buildings, were covered in a Multiple Property Submission study of churches in Stamford conducted in 1987. One of these, St. Andrew's Protestant Episcopal Church, was already listed on the National Register. Some of the others were subsequently listed as result of the study.

Contents: Counties and municipalities in Connecticut

Fairfield (city of Bridgeport | town of Greenwich | city of Stamford) | Hartford (city of Hartford | town of Southington | town of West Hartford | town of Windsor) | Litchfield | Middlesex (city of Middletown) | New Haven (city of New Haven) | New London | Tolland | Windham

This National Park Service list is complete through NPS recent listings posted October 23, 2026.

== Current listings ==
	Name on the Register	Image	Date listed	Location	Description
1	Agudath Sholem Synagogue	Agudath Sholem Synagogue	May 11, 1995 (#95000561)	29 Grove Street, in Downtown Stamford; 41°03′18″N 73°32′01″W	The congregation's second synagogue, now a church, completed in the Romanesque Revival style. The congregation worships in its third synagogue building (not listed).
2	Church of the Holy Name	Church of the Holy Name	December 24, 1987 (#87002131)	325 Washington Boulevard, in the South End; 41°02′41″N 73°32′34″W	
3	Cove Island Houses	Cove Island Houses	May 22, 1979 (#79002652)	Cove Road and Weed Avenue, in Cove Island Park (southeastern Stamford); 41°02′56″N 73°29′59″W	Although plural in name, this is a single house in Stamford, Connecticut that was expanded from a first section that dates from 1791. Now predominantly a Georgian style house with a newer Federal style wing, it is the only remainder of the large Stamford Mills complex at the Cove.
4	Deacon John Davenport House	Deacon John Davenport House	April 29, 1982 (#82004611)	129 Davenport Ridge Road, in North Stamford; 41°07′31″N 73°31′38″W	A saltbox house built in 1775 with Federal style features added later, significant for its architecture and for its association with the Davenport family.
5	Downtown Stamford Historic District	Downtown Stamford Historic District	October 6, 1983 (#83003502)	Atlantic, Main, Bank, and Bedford Streets; also bounded by Atlantic, Main, Bank, Bedford, Summer between Broad and Main Streets and Summer Place; also roughly Bedford Street between Broad and Forest Streets; 41°03′57″N 73°32′26″W	A historic district which first included the largest remaining area of pre-1930s commercial and institutional buildings in downtown Stamford. Its boundaries were expanded in 1985 to capture the only surviving area in downtown of lower-rent commercial structures such as warehouses, laundries, and stables. and in 2002 to add the 1939-built Avon Theatre and buildings of Late Gothic Revival and Art Deco architectural styles.
6	First Presbyterian Church	First Presbyterian Church	January 13, 2021 (#100006271)	1101 Bedford Street; 41°03′47″N 73°32′19″W	Aka the Fish Church
7	Fort Stamford Site	Fort Stamford Site	September 10, 1975 (#75001920)	900 Westover Road; 41°05′06″N 73°34′42″W	Now a city park.
8	Graham House	Graham House	September 13, 2011 (#11000609)	Address Restricted	
9	Benjamin Hait House	Benjamin Hait House	November 30, 1978 (#78002844)	92 Hoyclo Road, in North Stamford; 41°08′54″N 73°33′07″W	Built between 1728 and 1735; the oldest house in the area; a rare example of a New England farmhouse amidst a now-suburban area.
10	Hoyt-Barnum House	Hoyt-Barnum House	June 11, 1969 (#69000199)	1508 High Ridge Road; 41°07′21″N 73°32′41″W	Built around 1699, a timber frame construction or post and beam farmhouse made of field stone, laid up with clay, animal hair, and straw. The house is braced timber frame construction or post and beam. The house was moved to High Ridge Road in 2017.
11	Hubbard Heights Historic District	Hubbard Heights Historic District	October 18, 2016 (#16000724)	Hubbard Avenue and vicinity 41°03′40″N 73°33′10″W	
12	John Knap House	John Knap House	March 5, 1979 (#79002625)	984 Stillwater Road; 41°04′35″N 73°33′26″W	Built c. 1705 by a Capt. John Knap, and owned by his son, Lt. John Knap, and then grandson Samuel Knap in 1765. Believed to be the second oldest house in Stamford.
13	Jennie Leeds Gardener Cottage		March 20, 2026 (#100012862)	190 Fifth Street; 41°04′03″N 73°32′10″W	
14	Linden Apartments	Linden Apartments	August 11, 1983 (#83001252)	10-12 Linden Place; 41°03′36″N 73°32′42″W	Second Empire style building built in 1886; the oldest six-unit tenement apartment building in Stamford
15	Long Ridge Village Historic District	Long Ridge Village Historic District	June 2, 1987 (#86003653)	Old Long Ridge Road bounded by the New York State Line, Rock Rimmon Road, and Long Ridge Road/CT 104; Boundary increase (listed October 20, 2011): 1-130 Mill Road, 189-247 Old Long Ridge Road, 1257-1306 Rock Rimmon Road; 41°09′20″N 73°35′37″W	
16	Main Street Bridge	Main Street Bridge	May 21, 1987 (#87000801)	Carries Main Street over the Rippowam River in downtown Stamford; 41°03′08″N 73°32′44″W	"Connecticut's only wrought-iron lenticular truss remaining on a major artery in an urban center" and one of only 17 pony truss bridges in the state, built by the Berlin Iron Bridge Company
17	Marion Castle, Terre Bonne	Marion Castle, Terre Bonne	July 1, 1982 (#82004341)	1 Rogers Road, in the Shippan Point neighborhood 41°01′23″N 73°31′45″W	
18	Merritt Parkway	Merritt Parkway	April 17, 1991 (#91000410)	Route 15 right-of-way between the New York state line and the Sikorsky Memorial Bridge; also located in Greenwich, New Canaan, Norwalk, Westport, Fairfield, Trumbull, and Stratford; 41°06′30″N 73°33′20″W	Listing includes bridges crossing and bridges carrying the historic parkway.
19	Octagon House	Octagon House	August 17, 1979 (#79002624)	120 Strawberry Hill Avenue; 41°03′50″N 73°32′07″W	Demolished.
20	Old Town Hall	Old Town Hall	June 2, 1972 (#72001304)	Junction of Atlantic, Bank, and Main Streets, in Downtown Stamford; 41°03′11″N 73°32′26″W	
21	Gustavus and Sarah T. Pike House	Gustavus and Sarah T. Pike House	May 24, 1990 (#90000759)	164 Fairfield Avenue; 41°02′46″N 73°33′03″W	Queen Anne style house built in 1880 that is an excellent example of pattern book application. It includes machine-made spindles and other detailing that had only recently become cost-effective with then-modern manufacturing.
22	Revonah Manor Historic District	Revonah Manor Historic District	July 31, 1986 (#86002100)	Roughly bounded by Urban Street, East Avenue, Fifth, and Bedford Streets; 41°04′04″N 73°32′29″W	
23	Rockrimmon Rockshelter	Rockrimmon Rockshelter	August 5, 1994 (#94000847)	Address Restricted	An archeological site entered on a boulder about 60 feet high that was used as a shelter by early Native Americans.
24	St. Andrew's Protestant Episcopal Church	St. Andrew's Protestant Episcopal Church	December 6, 1983 (#83003510)	1231 Washington Boulevard in Downtown Stamford; 41°03′26″N 73°32′32″W	
25	St. Benedict's Church	St. Benedict's Church	December 24, 1987 (#87002130)	1A St. Benedict's Circle; 41°02′55″N 73°31′14″W	
26	St. John's Protestant Episcopal Church	St. John's Protestant Episcopal Church	December 24, 1987 (#87002128)	628 Main Street in Downtown Stamford; 41°03′17″N 73°32′02″W	A historic church that was built in 1869.
27	St. Luke's Chapel	St. Luke's Chapel	December 24, 1987 (#87002129)	714 Pacific Street, in the South End Historic District; 41°02′34″N 73°32′16″W	
28	St. Mary's Church	St. Mary's Church	December 24, 1987 (#87002123)	540 Elm Street; 41°02′59″N 73°31′29″W	A Roman Catholic church.
29	South End Historic District	South End Historic District	March 19, 1986 (#86000472)	Roughly bounded by Metro-North Railroad Tracks, Stamford Canal, Woodland Cemetery, and Washington Boulevard; 41°02′36″N 73°32′16″W	Historic district that includes 449 buildings, most dating from the 1870s to the 1930s, and also "an early naturalistic cemetery, and an iron bridge."
30	Stamford Harbor Lighthouse	Stamford Harbor Lighthouse	April 3, 1991 (#91000348)	South of breakwater, Stamford Harbor; 41°00′49″N 73°32′35″W	
31	C. J. Starr Barn and Carriage House	C. J. Starr Barn and Carriage House	September 14, 1979 (#79002623)	200 Strawberry Hill Avenue; 41°04′03″N 73°32′06″W	
32	Suburban Club	Suburban Club	August 10, 1989 (#89001090)	6 Suburban Avenue/580 Main Street, in Downtown Stamford; 41°03′16″N 73°32′08″W	
33	Turn-of-River Bridge	Turn-of-River Bridge	July 31, 1987 (#87000798)	Old North Stamford Road at Rippowam River in Northern Stamford; 41°06′54″N 73°32′42″W	A lenticular pony truss bridge built by the Berlin Iron Bridge Company in 1892, using a design patented by William O. Douglas in 1878 for a lens-type truss bridge. It brings the Old Stamford Road across Rippowam River.
34	Unitarian-Universalist Church	Unitarian-Universalist Church	December 24, 1987 (#87002126)	20 Forest Street in Downtown Stamford; 41°03′27″N 73°32′14″W	
35	US Post Office-Stamford Main	US Post Office-Stamford Main	December 12, 1985 (#85003328)	421 Atlantic Street; 41°02′59″N 73°32′22″W	
36	Zion Lutheran Church	Zion Lutheran Church	December 24, 1987 (#87002127)	132 Glenbrook Road; 41°03′35″N 73°31′39″W	A "fine example of ecclesiastical Neo-Gothic architecture", built of red brick.

== See also ==
- National Register of Historic Places listings in Fairfield County, Connecticut
- National Register of Historic Places listings in Greenwich, Connecticut
- National Register of Historic Places listings in Bridgeport, Connecticut
- List of National Historic Landmarks in Connecticut
