= Cove Island Houses =

Historic house in Connecticut, United States

- U.S. National Register of Historic Places
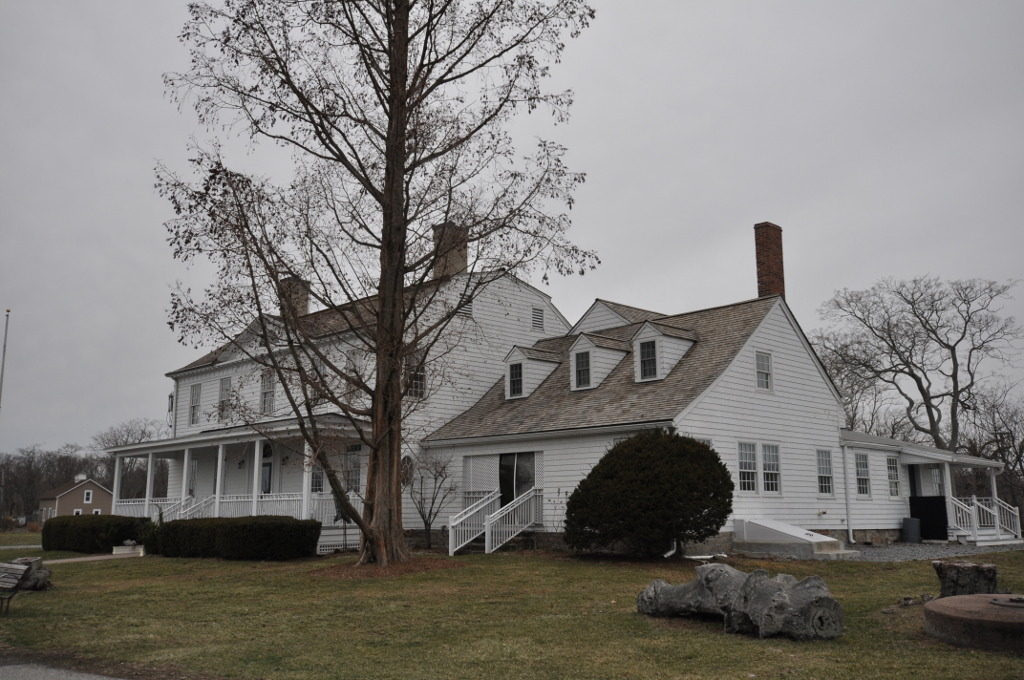

- Location within Connecticut Location within the United States
- Location: Cove Road and Weed Avenue, Cove Island Park, Stamford, Connecticut
- Coordinates: 41°2′56″N 73°29′59″W
- Area: less than one acre
- Built: 1791
- Architectural style: Georgian; Federal
- NRHP reference No.: 79002652
- Added to NRHP: May 22, 1979

The Cove Island Houses, although plural in name, is a single house in Cove Island Park, in Stamford, Connecticut. The house was expanded from a first section that dates from 1791, and is now predominantly a Georgian style house with an older wing. It is the only building that is a legacy of the large Stamford Mills complex at the Cove. It was listed on the National Register of Historic Places in 1979. It presently houses administrative offices of Cove Island Park.

== Description and history ==
In Stamford's colonial history, Cove Island was used as an animal pound for stray animals, a use that began to decline in 1791, when John Fitch dammed the Noroton River and John Holly built a grist mill on the island to use the dam's water power. The smaller, older portion of Cove Island Houses is believed to have been built by John Holly at about the same time as the mill. Holly's operations expanded in the early 19th century to include a second mill, and he probably built the larger portion of the house sometime between 1810 and 1835, in order to house his large family. Over the course of the 19th century, the mill complexes were greatly expanded, but were destroyed in the late 19th and early 20th centuries by a series of fires, leaving only the house standing.

The main block of the house is a 2 1/2-story frame structure, built with what would have been somewhat retairdaire (out of date) Georgian styling. It is finished with wooden clapboards, and is topped by a gambrel roof with modillioned cornice, and with chimneys at either end. The front facade is five bays wide, with a peaked gable housing a half-round window. A single-story porch extends across the front, with a hip roof supported by square posts. To the right of the main block stands the older section, a 1 1/2-story frame structure, with a gabled roof pierced by three dormers.

== See also ==
- National Register of Historic Places listings in Stamford, Connecticut
