= Hayt =

Hayt may refer to:

== People ==
- Charles Hayt (1850–1927), American attorney
- Harry H. Pratt (1864–1932)
- Stephen T. Hayt (1822–1907), American politician

== Places ==
- Hayt Golf Learning Center

== Other ==
- Hayt, the name of the Duncan Idaho clone in Frank Herbert's Dune series.

== See also ==
- Hait (disambiguation)
