= Khait =

Khait may refer to:

- Chait, an alternative transliteration
- Hait (disambiguation), an alternative transliteration
