= Richard Howland Hunt =

American architect

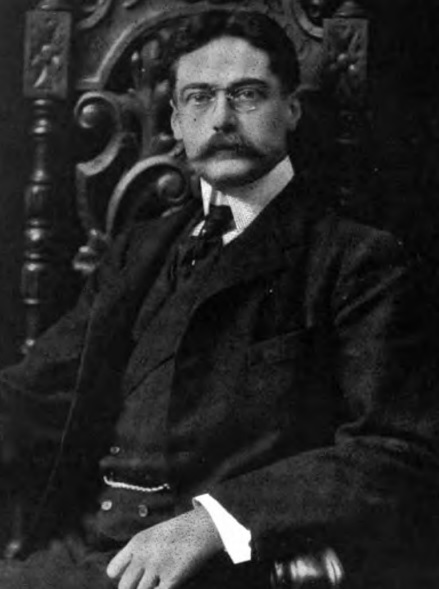
- Born: March 14, 1862; Paris, France
- Died: July 12, 1931 (aged 69); New York City, US
- Resting place: Newport, Rhode Island
- Education: Massachusetts Institute of Technology; École des Beaux-Arts

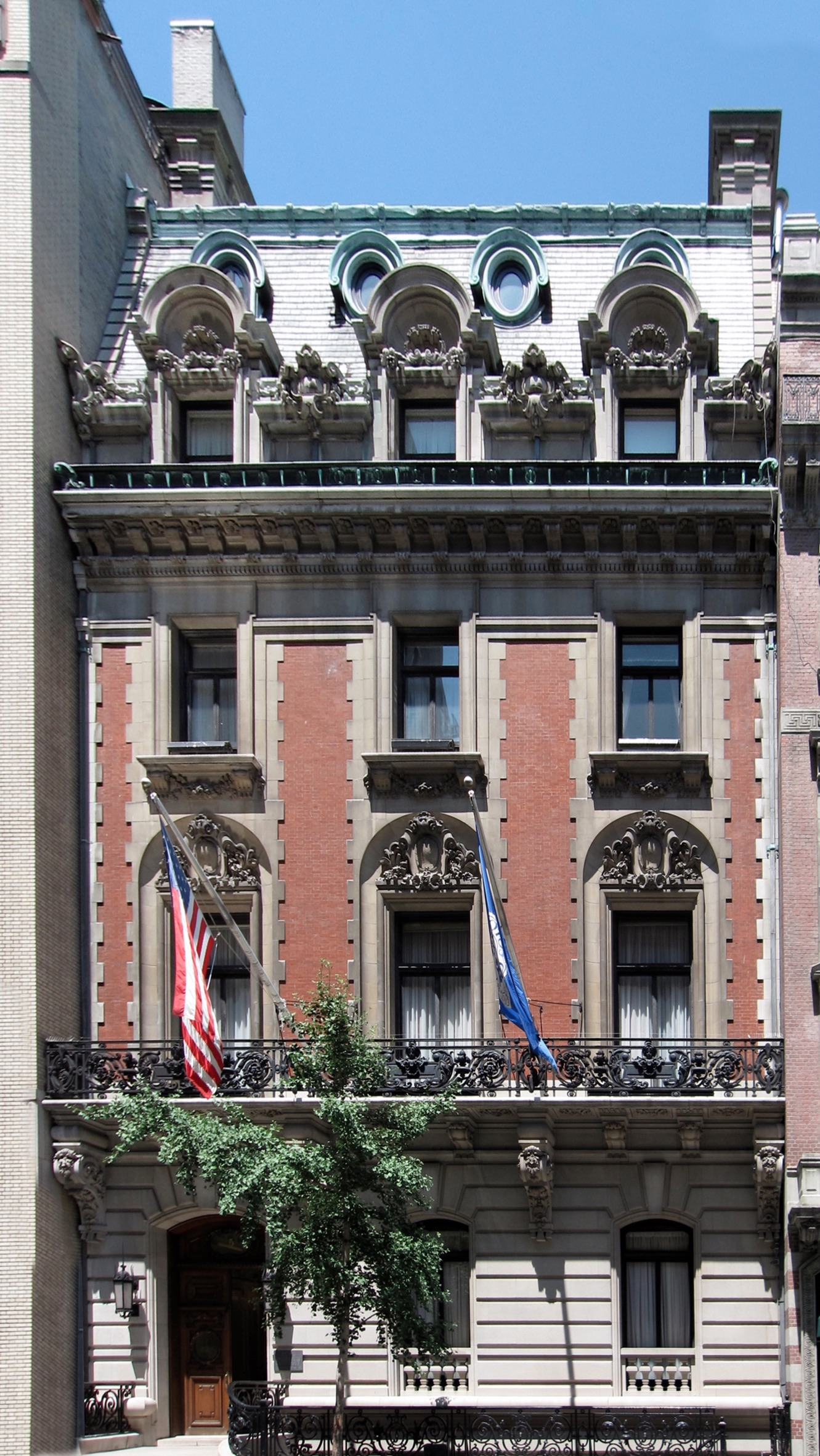
5 East 66th Street, now the Lotos Club

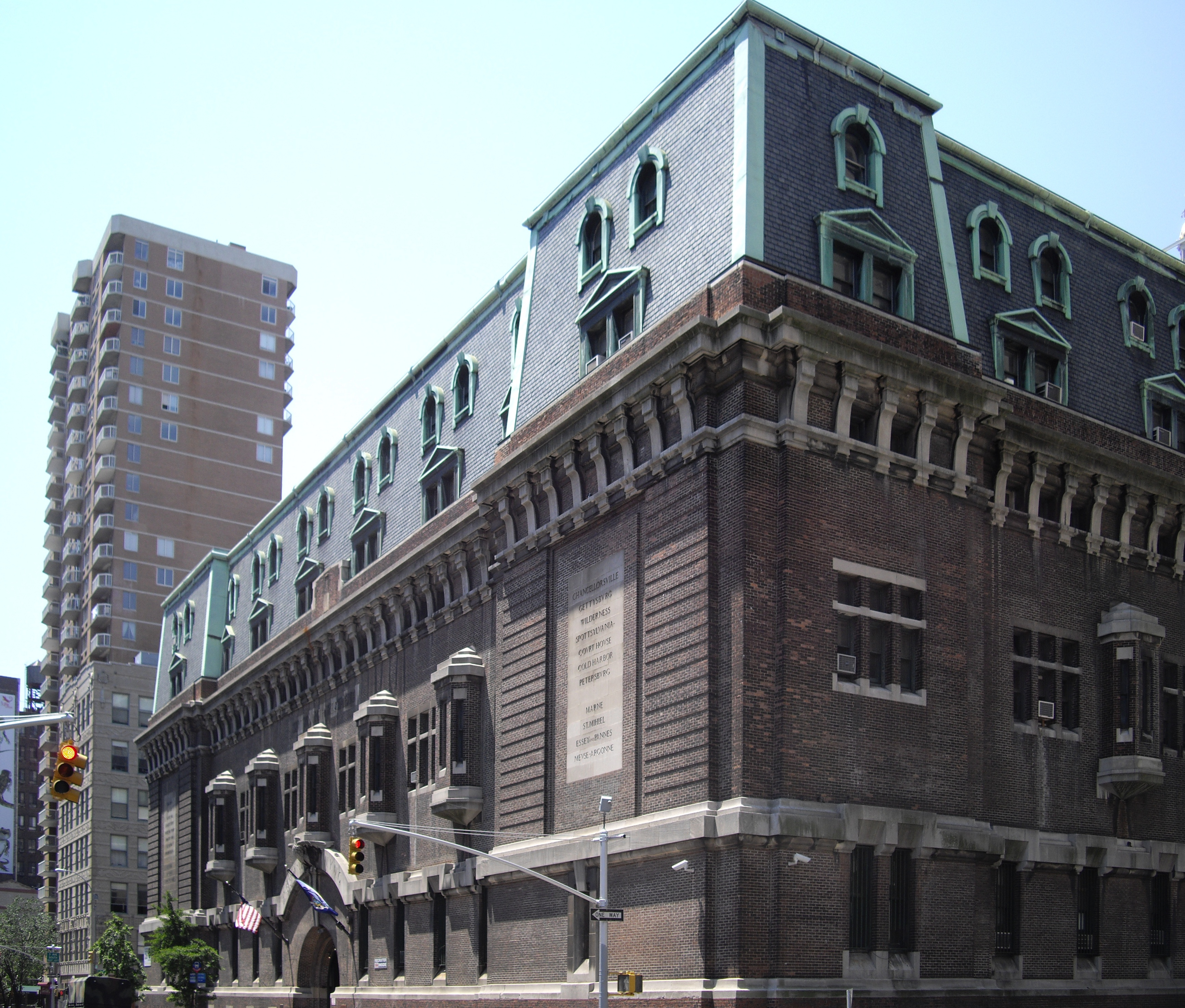
The 69th Regiment Armory in Manhattan, completed in 1906

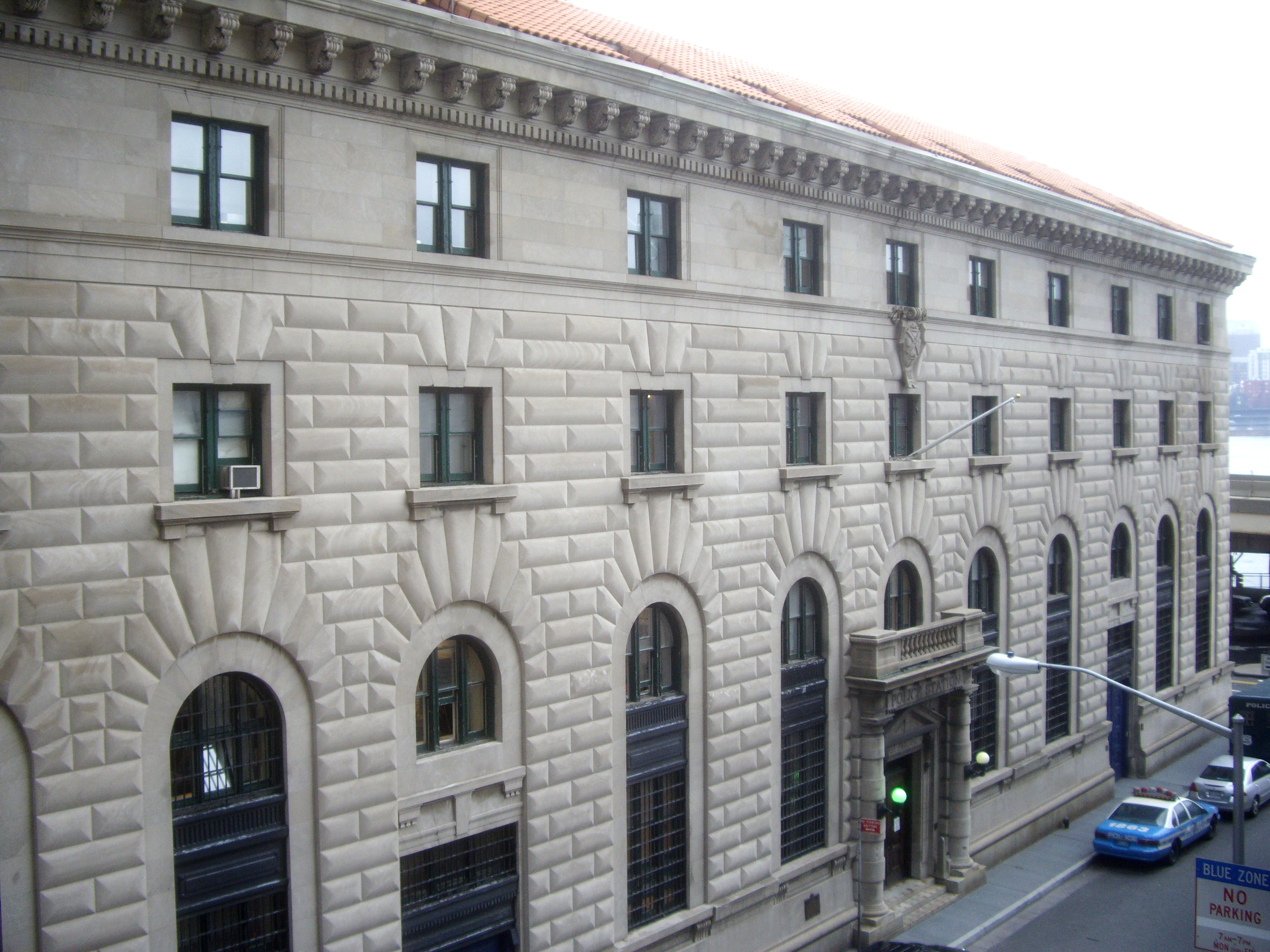
The First Police Precinct Station, now the New York City Police Museum

Richard Howland Hunt (March 14, 1862 – July 12, 1931) was an American architect and member of the Hunt family of Vermont who worked with his brother Joseph Howland Hunt in New York City at Hunt & Hunt.

The brothers were sons of Richard Morris Hunt, the first American Beaux-Arts architect. Richard practiced in his father's office until the elder Hunt died in 1895, then continued to carry out his father's designs for the central block of the Metropolitan Museum of Art, not without initial resistance by the museum's trustees. In 1901, the brothers formed a partnership that lasted until Joseph's death in 1924.

== Early life ==
Hunt was born on March 14, 1862, in Paris, where his father, Richard Morris Hunt (1827–1895), was completing his architectural studies. His mother, Catherine Clinton Howland (1841–1880), was the youngest daughter of the prominent merchant Samuel Shaw Howland of Howland & Aspinwall. His siblings were Catharine Howland Hunt (wife of Rear Adm. Livingston Hunt, son of William H. Hunt), fellow architect Joseph Howland Hunt, Esther Morris Hunt (wife of George Muirson Woolsey), and oilman Herbert Leavitt Hunt (who married Evelyn Frances Bell).

Hunt studied architecture at the Massachusetts Institute of Technology and the École des Beaux-Arts, Paris, where his father had studied. His younger brother Joseph studied at Harvard College and the School of Architecture at Columbia University before following his brother to the École des Beaux-Arts, returning to New York in 1901.

== Career ==
In 1887, Richard Hunt joined his father's offices, first as a draftsman and later an associate. After his father's death, he attracted wealthy clients and built residences such as the Margaret Shepard house at 5 East 66th Street in 1900 (today home to the Lotos Club).

Urban residences by Hunt & Hunt include the two Beaux-Arts houses designed for George W. Vanderbilt at 645 and 647 Fifth Avenue, known as The "Marble Twins". Only No. 647, a designated New York City Landmark, survives today.

The brothers were primarily known for their elegant residences in Long Island, Tuxedo Park, New York, and Newport, Rhode Island. Their armory building for the 69th Regiment, New York, was the first armory to abandon pseudo-medieval crenellations.

== Hunt & Hunt projects ==
- Alumnae House and Williams House, Vassar College. 1924. Half-timbered construction.

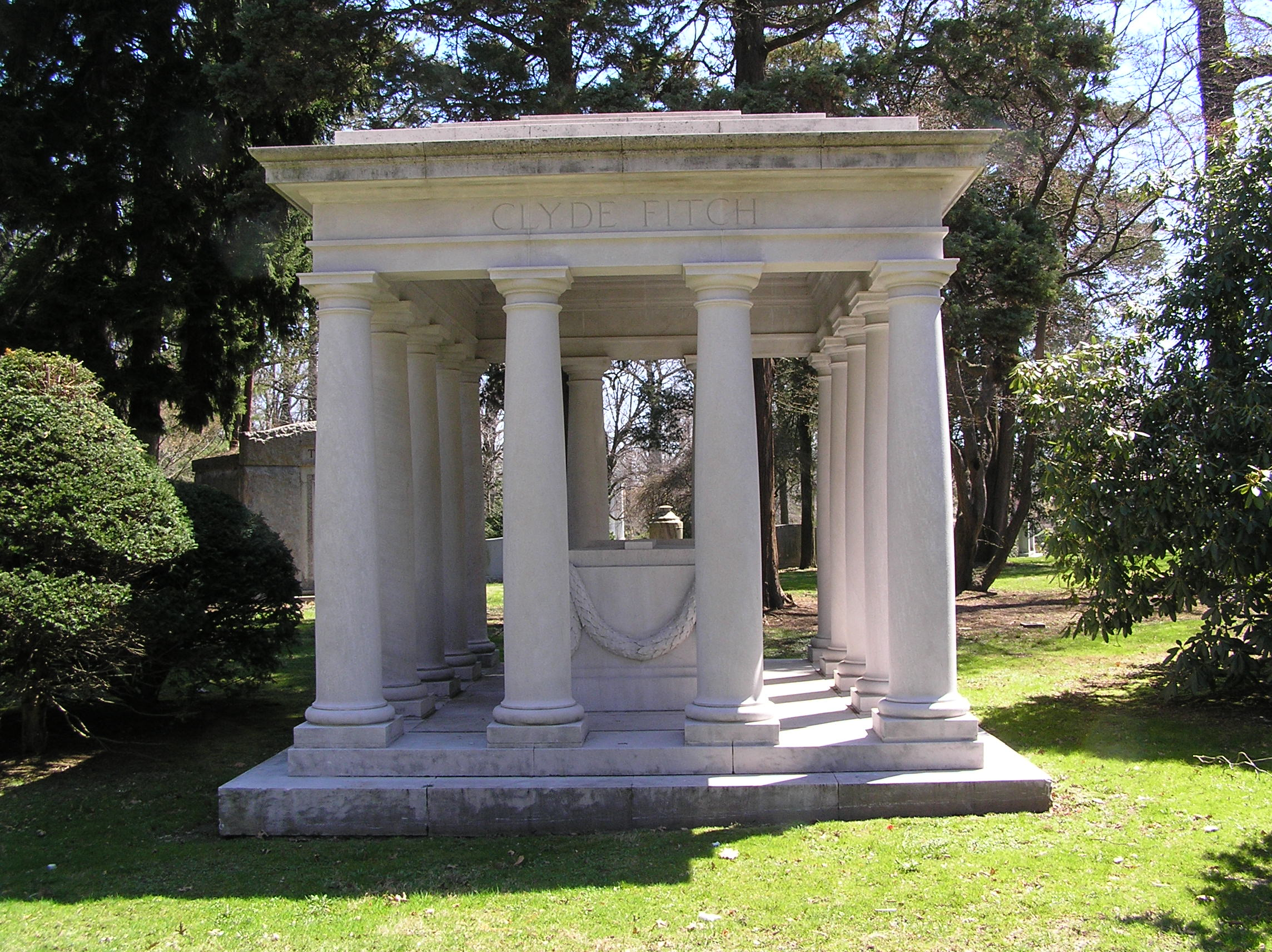
The gravesite of Clyde Fitch

- Memorial and sarcophagus for playwright Clyde Fitch at Woodlawn Cemetery in The Bronx, New York City, 1910s.
- George Washington Vanderbilt Houses, 645 and 647 Fifth Avenue, New York, called the "Marble Twins." 1902-05. Number 647 survives, a designated landmark, as the flagship store for Versace; the site of 645 is now Olympic Tower.
- Forest Hall, Milford, Pennsylvania. 1903. For James Pinchot, for whom Richard Morris hunt had built Grey Towers. (National Register of Historic Places)
- Garden City Golf Club clubhouse, Garden City, New York. 1899.
- Sanderson estate, Oyster Bay, New York. 1885.
- Idle Hour estate of William K. Vanderbilt, Oakdale, N.Y.
- St. Mary's-in-Tuxedo Episcopal Church Rectory, Tuxedo Park, New York. 1895.
- 69th Regiment Armory, between 25th and 26th Streets and Lexington and Park Avenues. 1903-06.
- Saddle Rock House, Shippan Point, Connecticut, 1914, for inventor Thomas Robins.
- Terre Bonne, Shippan Point, Connecticut, 1914, for pioneer filmmaker/movie producer Frank J. Marion.
- Edward Harden Mansion, Sleepy Hollow, New York, 1909.
- Sabine Farm Greenwich, Connecticut, 1910, for publisher H. J. Fisher
- First Precinct Police Station, New York. 1909-11.
- Amos R. E. Pinchot House, Park Avenue at 85th Street. 1910.
- Beacon Towers, Sands Point, New York, 1917–18, for Alva Belmont. It was their last commission on the Gold Coast.

== Collaborations with sculptors ==
As did many of the architects of the time, Hunt & Hunt designed bases and pedestals for sculptors. These include:

- William McKinley Monument by Charles Mulligan, Chicago, Illinois, 1905
- Sighting the Enemy for Edward Clark Potter in Monroe, Michigan, 1910
- Lafayette Monument by John Ferguson Weir, Milford, Pennsylvania
