= Revonah Manor Historic District =

Historic district in Connecticut, United States

- U.S. National Register of Historic Places
- U.S. Historic district
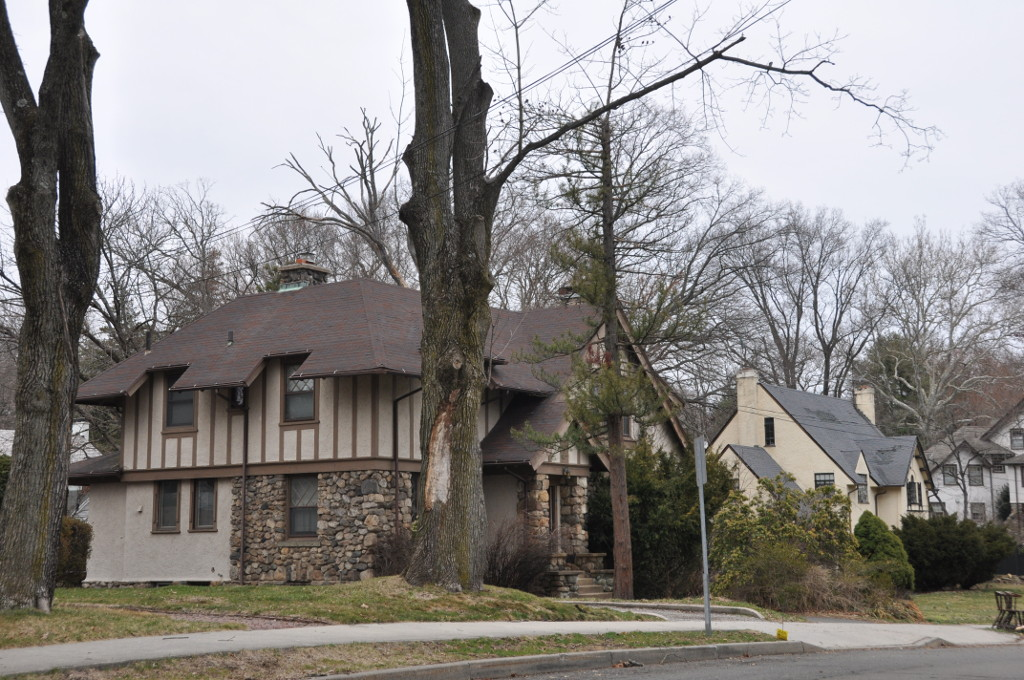

- Location within Connecticut Location within the United States
- Location: Roughly bounded by Urban Street, East Avenue, Fifth, and Bedford Streets, Stamford, Connecticut
- Coordinates: 41°4′4″N 73°32′29″W
- Area: 23.1 acres (9.3 ha)
- Built: 1909
- Architect: Henneberger & Jevne; Barnard, Lawrence
- Architectural style: Colonial Revival, Tudor Revival, Arts & Crafts;Queen Anne
- NRHP reference No.: 86002100
- Added to NRHP: July 31, 1986

The Revonah Manor Historic District is a 23.1-acre (9.3 ha) predominantly residential historic district in Stamford, Connecticut that was listed on the National Register of Historic Places in 1986. The district encompasses what was one of Stamford's first planned residential developments, developed by Herman Henneberg and his son-in-law Henry Jevne, with many houses designed by Lawrence Barnard. The result was a remarkable concentration of fairly uniformly-designed Colonial Revival and Tudor Revival houses in a three-block area. Most of the houses are on Urban, Chester, and Fifth Streets, between Revonah Avenue and Bedford Street.

== See also ==
- National Register of Historic Places listings in Stamford, Connecticut
