= Gustavus and Sarah T. Pike House =

Historic house in Connecticut, United States

- U.S. National Register of Historic Places
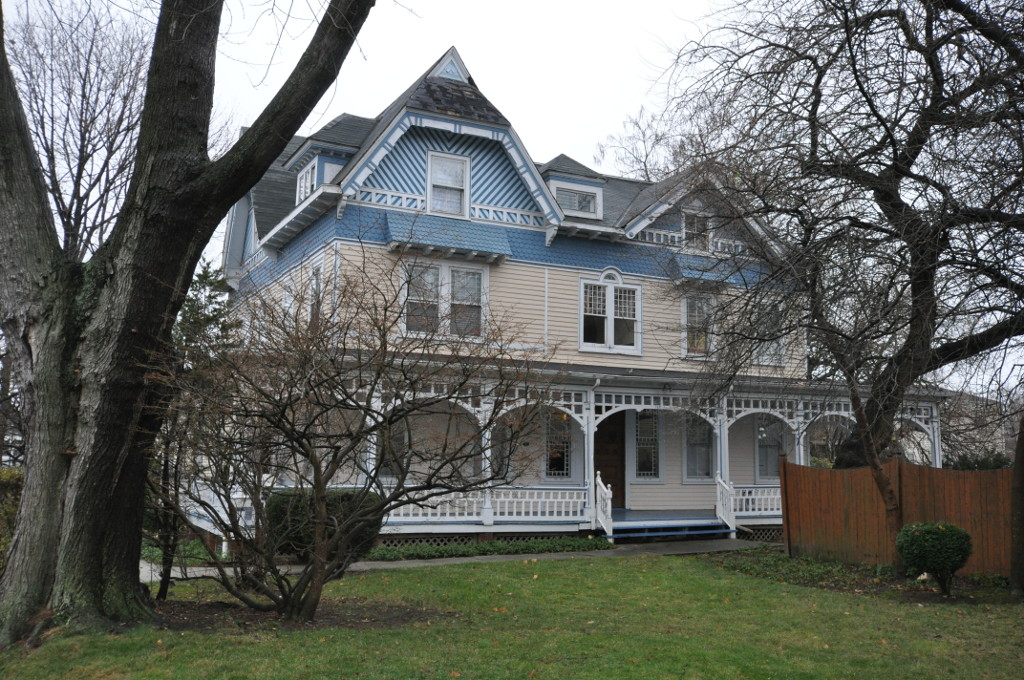

- Location within Connecticut Location within the United States
- Location: 164 Fairfield Avenue, Stamford, Connecticut
- Coordinates: 41°2′46″N 73°33′47″W
- Area: 2 acres (0.81 ha)
- Built: 1880
- Architect: Fuller, Waldo
- Architectural style: Stick/Eastlake, Queen Anne
- NRHP reference No.: 90000759
- Added to NRHP: May 24, 1990

The Gustavus and Sarah T. Pike House is a historic house at 164 Fairfield Avenue, in the southwestern section of the city of Stamford, Connecticut is a Queen Anne style house built in 1880. It was listed on the National Register of Historic Places in 1990. It is architecturally significant as a good example of a Queen Anne style house in Stamford, and also an excellent example of pattern book application. The building follows a pattern book design by H. H. Holly. It includes machine-made spindle and other detailing that only then became cost-effective with then-modern manufacturing.

== See also ==
- National Register of Historic Places listings in Stamford, Connecticut
