= John Knap House =

Historic house in Connecticut, United States

- U.S. National Register of Historic Places
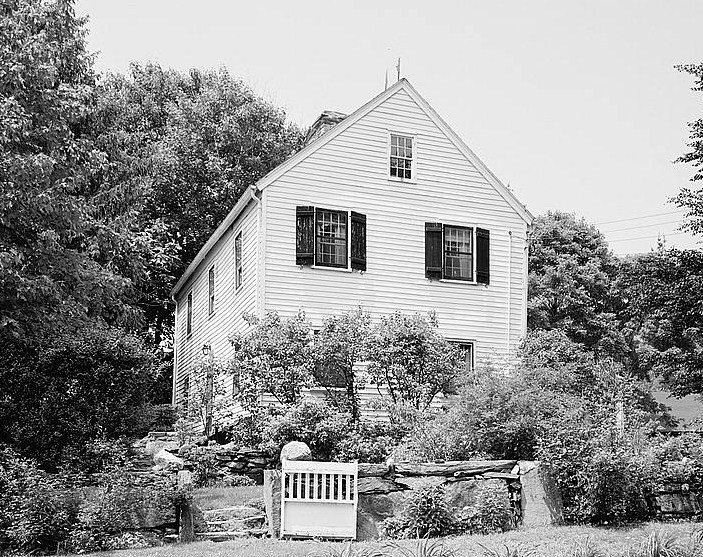
- Knap House in 1968

- Location within Connecticut Location within the United States
- Location: 984 Stillwater Road, Stamford, Connecticut
- Coordinates: 41°4′35″N 73°33′26″W
- Area: 0.8 acres (0.32 ha)
- Built: 1705
- Architect: Knap, John
- NRHP reference No.: 79002625
- Added to NRHP: March 05, 1979

The John Knap House, also known as Samuel Knap House, is a historic house at 984 Stillwater Road in Stamford, Connecticut. The house is a 2 1/2-story wood-frame structure, five bays wide, with a large central chimney. It was built c. 1705 by a Capt. John Knap and was owned by his son, Lt. John Knap. The house was bought from the Lt. John Knap's estate by his son Samuel Knap in 1765. It is believed to be the second oldest house in Stamford.

The house was listed on the National Register of Historic Places in 1979.

== See also ==
- National Register of Historic Places listings in Stamford, Connecticut
