= Linden Apartments =

- U.S. National Register of Historic Places
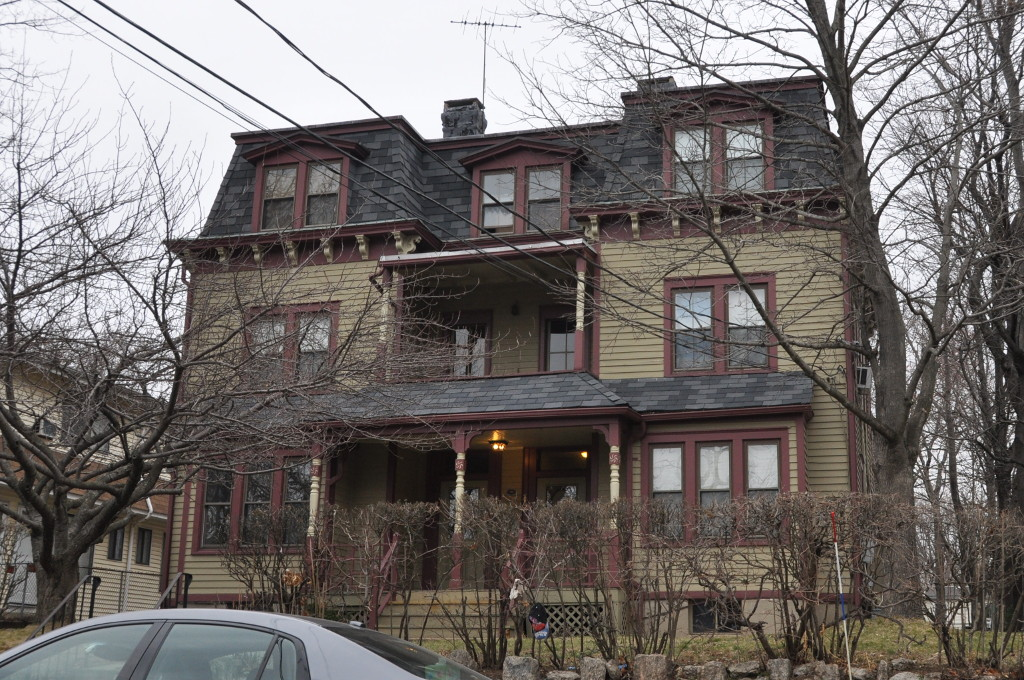

- Location within Connecticut Location within the United States
- Location: 10–12 Linden Place, Stamford, Connecticut
- Coordinates: 41°3′36″N 73°32′42″W
- Area: 0.2 acres (0.081 ha)
- Built: 1886
- Architectural style: Second Empire
- NRHP reference No.: 83001252
- Added to NRHP: August 11, 1983

The Linden Apartments are a historic multiunit apartment house at 10–12 Linden Place in Stamford, Connecticut. It is a 2 1/2-story wood-frame Second Empire style building with a mansard roof, and projecting window bays. Built in 1886, it is the most architecturally distinctive tenement house in the city, and is its oldest surviving six-unit building. It was probably built by George Hoyt, one Stamford's leading 19th-century real estate developers.

The building was listed on the National Register of Historic Places in 1983.

== See also ==
- National Register of Historic Places listings in Stamford, Connecticut
