= Shippan =

- Neighborhood
- Location within Connecticut
- Coordinates: 41.0487°N 73.5244°W
- Country: United States
- State: Connecticut
- County: Fairfield County
- City: Stamford

Shippan is a neighborhood the city of Stamford, Connecticut, located along the Long Island Sound.

== History ==
Prior to the late 19th century, the area of present-day Shippan was largely agricultural. Starting around that time, Shippan Point (a section of Shippan) became a popular summer retreat for affluent New York City residents. Sailing became popular among this demographic, and two yacht clubs were established by these people: the Stamford Yacht Club, and the Halloween Yacht Club.

== Geography ==
As a neighborhood with no administrative function, Shippan's boundaries are ambiguous. In a 2019 demographic report, the city of Stamford defined Shippan as largely confined to the peninsula of Shippan Point, which juts into the Long Island Sound, and a 2005 profile of the neighborhood used Shippan and Shippan Point interchangeably. However, some residents and local reporters also constitute areas north of Shippan Point as Shippan.

To the west of Shippan is the South End, to the north is Downtown, to the northeast is the East Side, and to the east is The Cove. The area south of the intersection of Shippan Avenue and Magee Avenue is considered the Shippan Point neighborhood. To the north, the Metro-North train tracks and Interstate 95 separate Shippan from Downtown Stamford.

Virtually all of Shippan Point is zoned for single-family and two-family residential buildings.

Major streets in Shippan include Shippan Avenue and Elm Street.

== Demographics ==
Shippan is a demographically diverse neighborhood, although it varies from section to section. While the neighborhood is home to many working class people, the Shippan Point area is notably more wealthy and homogenous.

== Economy ==
Shippan is home to various types of ethnic businesses, including Asian Indian stores and Italian pizzerias on Cove Road, and European delis on Elm Street.

The neighborhood includes Cummings Park public beach, St. Mary Roman Catholic Church, and St. Benedict Roman Catholic Church. The neighborhood also hosts a supermarket, and many restaurants and small retail businesses.

A Clairol factory is located where the Shippan meets the Cove section on Cove Avenue. In 2008, Clairol Corporation announced plans to sell the facility. In 2011, the Clariol factory (which had been abandoned) was demolished and replaced with an NBC Sports studio and the Chelsea Piers Stamford athletic and aquatic club.

=== Sewage treatment plant ===
Shippan is home to the Water Pollution Control Authority, a sewage treatment plant. The plant, which also serves Darien, is located on Magee Avenue by the East Branch of Stamford Harbor. Originally built in 1974 with a capacity of 17 million US gallons (64,000 m^{3}) per day, the plant was upgraded in 2005 for $105 million, increasing its capacity to 24 million US gallons (91,000 m^{3}) per day and a maximum peak flow capacity of 68 million US gallons (260,000 m^{3}) per day. The city began treating sewage to remove nitrogen in 1988, and the 2005 upgrade increased the amount of nitrogen removed from sewage from 65 percent to 90 percent. The upgrade also included three odor-control machines at a total cost of $6 million. The machines use massive fans to suck odiferous fumes into chambers where chemicals are used to remove 99.9 percent of the hydrogen sulfide that causes the odor. An ultraviolet light disinfectant machine sterilizes the water in the plant and eliminates the need to use and store large amounts of chlorine.

The plant is a major landmark in the neighborhood, and many residents have previously complained about the smell that emanates from it.
