= Rockrimmon Rockshelter =

Archaeological site in Connecticut, United States

- U.S. National Register of Historic Places
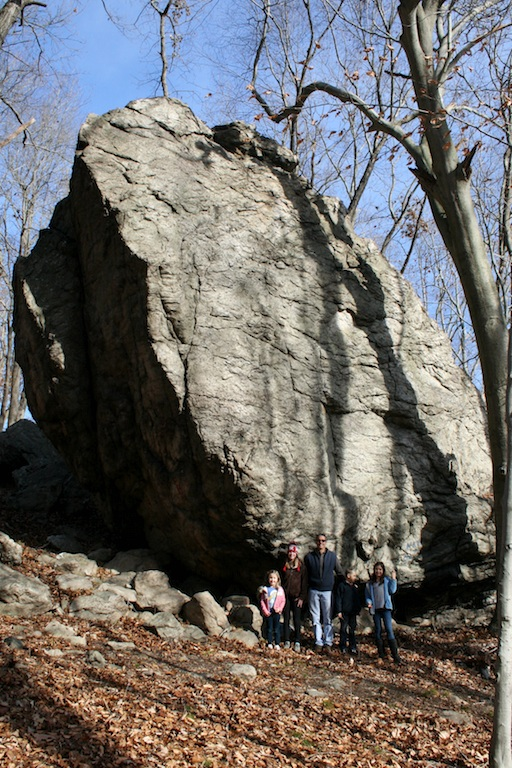
- Location: Stamford, Connecticut
- Area: less than one acre
- NRHP reference No.: 94000847
- Added to NRHP: August 5, 1994

The Rockrimmon Rockshelter is an archeological site in Stamford, Connecticut that was listed on the National Register of Historic Places in 1994. The site is significant as an early Native American shelter and is centered on a boulder about 60 feet high that was used as the shelter. Native American tools and points were discovered at the site during excavations in 1975 and 1980.

The site is dated to the Middle and Late Archaic periods. In 1974, when there was a possibility that the site would be destroyed, members of the Norwalk Community College Archaeology Club undertook an investigation. Investigations ceased after the landowner said that he had decided not to destroy Rockrimmon Rock or its immediate surroundings if the land was developed.

== See also ==
- National Register of Historic Places listings in Stamford, Connecticut
