= Deacon John Davenport House =

Historic house in Connecticut, United States

- U.S. National Register of Historic Places
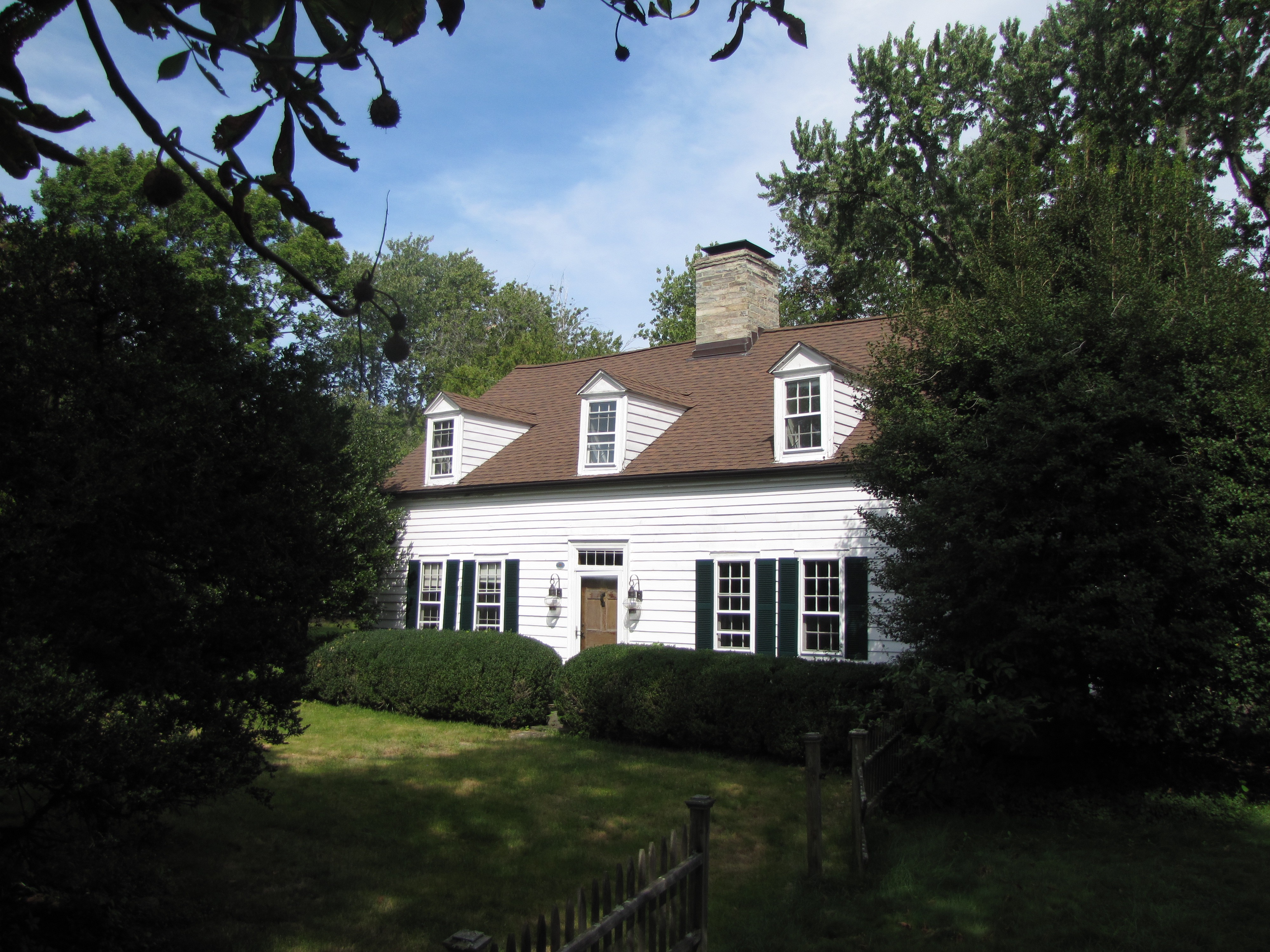

- Location within Connecticut Location within the United States
- Location: 129 Davenport Ridge Road, Stamford, Connecticut
- Coordinates: 41°7′31″N 73°31′38″W
- Area: 3.8 acres (1.5 ha)
- Built: 1775
- Architect: Davenport, Deacon John
- Architectural style: Georgian
- NRHP reference No.: 82004611
- Added to NRHP: April 29, 1982

The Deacon John Davenport House is a historic house at 129 Davenport Ridge Road in Stamford, Connecticut, United States. Built in 1775, it is significant for its architecture and for its association with the locally prominent Davenport family, descended from John Davenport, one of the founders of New Haven. The house was listed on the National Register of Historic Places in 1982.

== Description and history ==
The Davenport House is located in Stamford's suburban northern section, on the south side of Davenport Ridge Road at its eastern junction with Thornbridge Drive. It is a 1 1/2-story wood-frame structure, with a clapboarded exterior. It is built in a typical saltbox method, with an integral leanto section extending the rear roof line. A large brick chimney rises at the center of the roof ridge. The main facade is five bays wide, with sash windows arranged symmetrically around the entrance. The entrance is simply framed, with a five-light transom window above. 19th and 20th-century additions extend the main block to the rear. The interior follows a typical central chimney plan, with parlors on either side of the chimney, and a long and narrow kitchen behind. A stairwell leads to the upper level from the kitchen, and there was probably once also a narrow winding stair in the entry vestibule.

The house was built in 1775 by Deacon John Davenport, a fourth-generation descendant of John Davenport, one of the founders of New Haven. His grandfather had been granted an extensive tract of land in this area, which became known as Davenport Ridge. This house remained in the Davenport family until 1972, surviving a 19th-century Victorian mansion which was built on the property by Amzi Benedict Davenport, who grew up in this house. This house is architecturally notable for its mix of early and late 18th-century stylistic elements.

== See also ==
- National Register of Historic Places listings in Stamford, Connecticut
