= Graham House (Stamford, Connecticut) =

Historic house in Connecticut, United States

- U.S. National Register of Historic Places
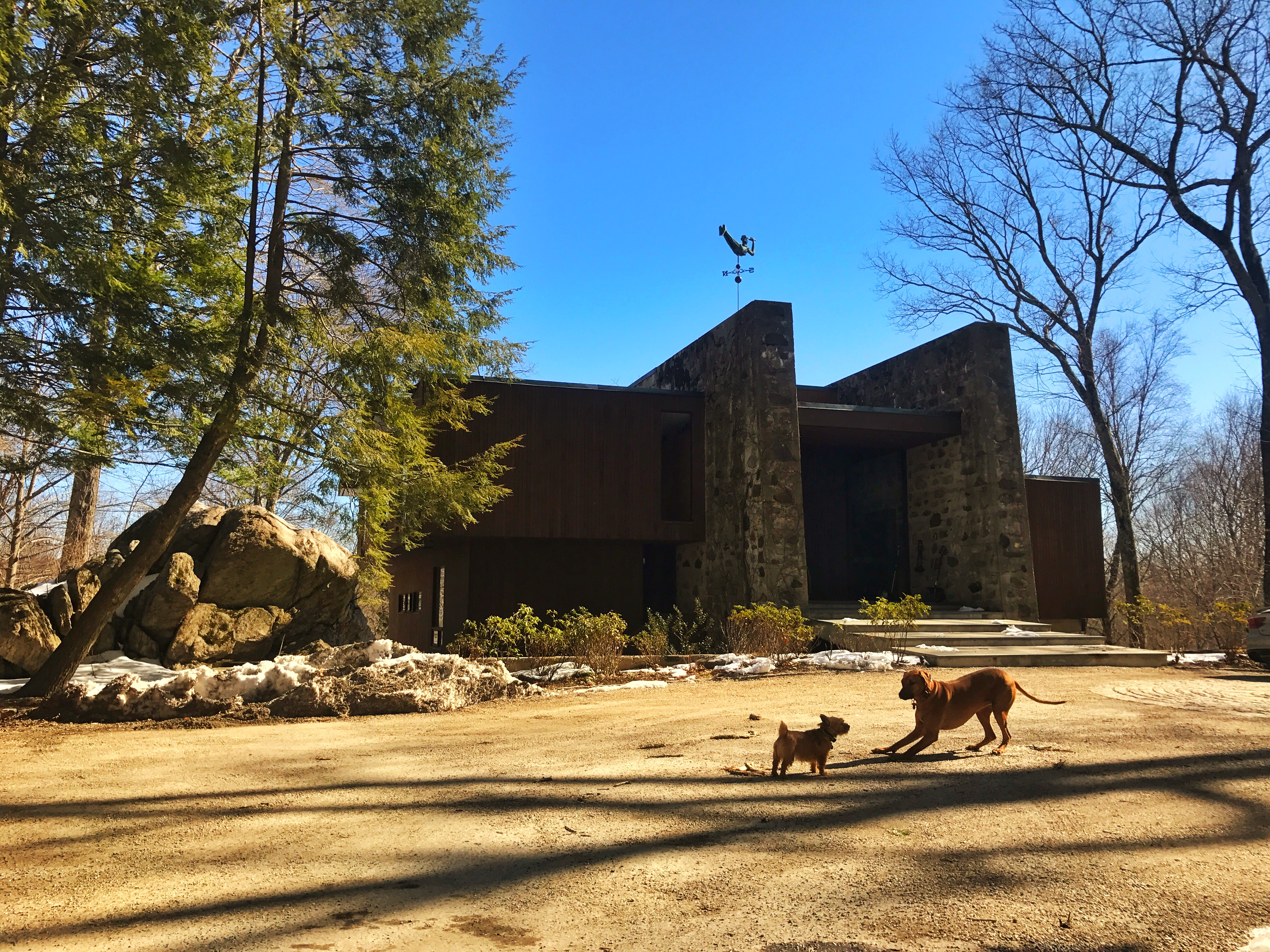

- Location within Connecticut Location within the United States
- Location: Stamford, Connecticut
- Coordinates: 41.110916°N 73.600820°W
- Built: 1968
- Architect: Eliot Noyes
- Architectural style: Modern
- NRHP reference No.: 11000609
- Added to NRHP: September 13, 2011

The Graham House is a dramatic Modern house designed by architect Eliot Noyes for Manhattan art dealer Robert Graham and built in 1968–69. The house is located at the crest of a rocky outcrop in a rural section of Stamford, Connecticut. It represents the culmination of a series of properties designed by Noyes in which he developed the idea of having two stone walls forming a central hallway, with rooms cantilevered off the outside of those walls.

The dominant features of the house are two parallel walls, built out of fieldstone and concrete, with the former including stones gathered from the property. The space in between these two high walls acts as a kind of street, with flagstone paving. The main rooms of the house project outward from these walls, appearing to float over the surrounding landscape. The exterior of these rooms is finished in glass and brown stained vertical board siding.

The first house that Eliot Noyes designed featuring parallel stone walls was his own home in New Canaan, which was built in 1954. It had two stone walls on either side of a central courtyard. He further developed this idea with several designs that were never actually executed.

The house was listed on the National Register of Historic Places in 1978. The listing was unusual in that the house was not yet 50 years old, a traditional cutoff for historic buildings; this was in recognition of the importance of this execution of the idea. In 2012, the house was protected by a preservation easement held by Historic New England.

== See also ==
- National Register of Historic Places listings in Stamford, Connecticut
