= Octagon House (Stamford, Connecticut) =

Historic house in Connecticut, United States

- U.S. National Register of Historic Places
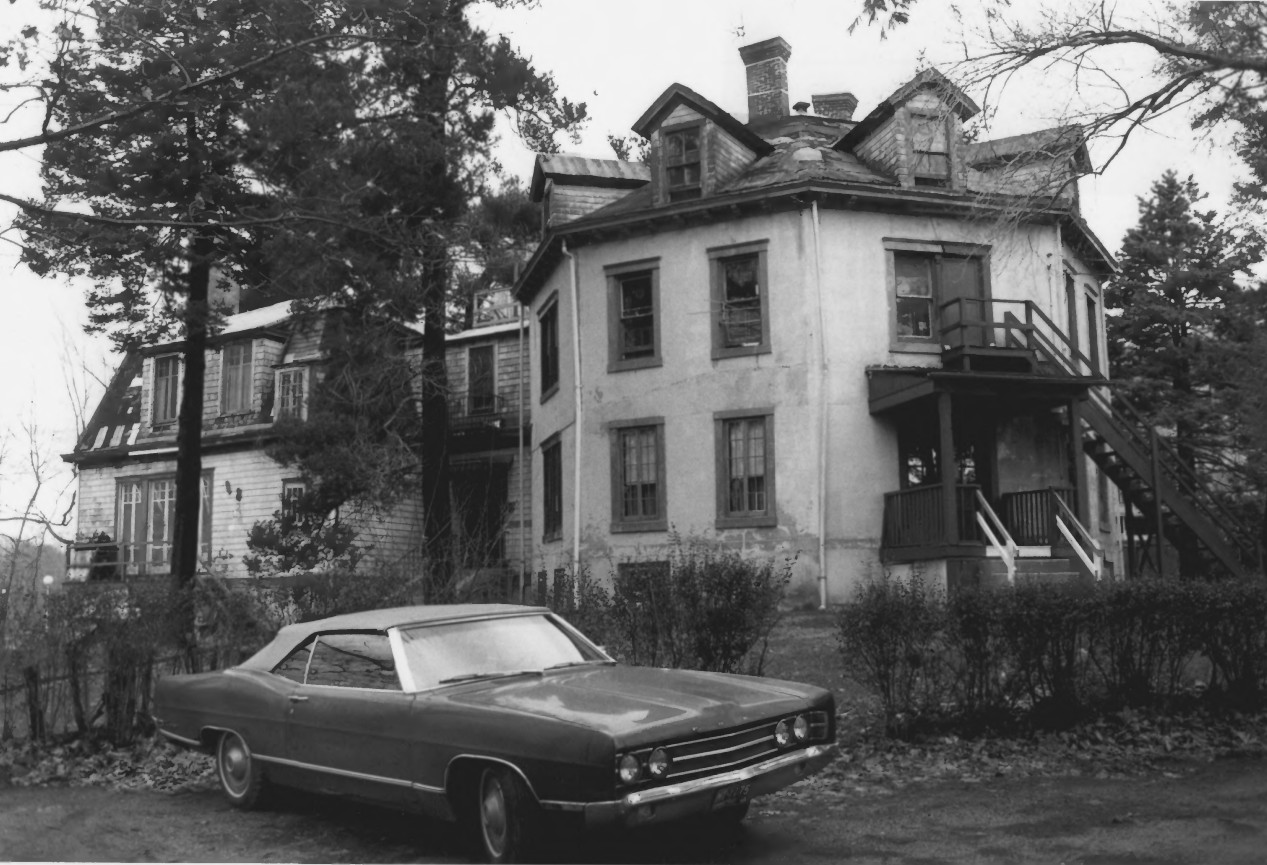
- 1978 photo

- Location within Connecticut Location within the United States
- Location: 120 Strawberry Hill Avenue, Stamford, Connecticut
- Coordinates: 41°3′50.29″N 73°32′7.49″W
- NRHP reference No.: 79002624
- Added to NRHP: August 17, 1979

The Octagon House was a historic house at 120 Strawberry Hill Avenue, on the edge of the Glenbrook section of Stamford, Connecticut. It was one of a number of octagon houses in the United States, built during a fad in buildings of that shape from the late 1840s to the 1870s. The octagonal portion of the house was concrete, with external scoring to imitate ashlar. The use of concrete as a building material was also promoted by Orson Squire Fowler, the primary mover behind the octagon house fad.

The house was listed on the National Register of Historic Places in 1979. It was destroyed by fire in 1985.

== See also ==
- National Register of Historic Places listings in Stamford, Connecticut
