= Holy Name of Jesus Parish (Stamford, Connecticut) =

Historic church in Connecticut, United States

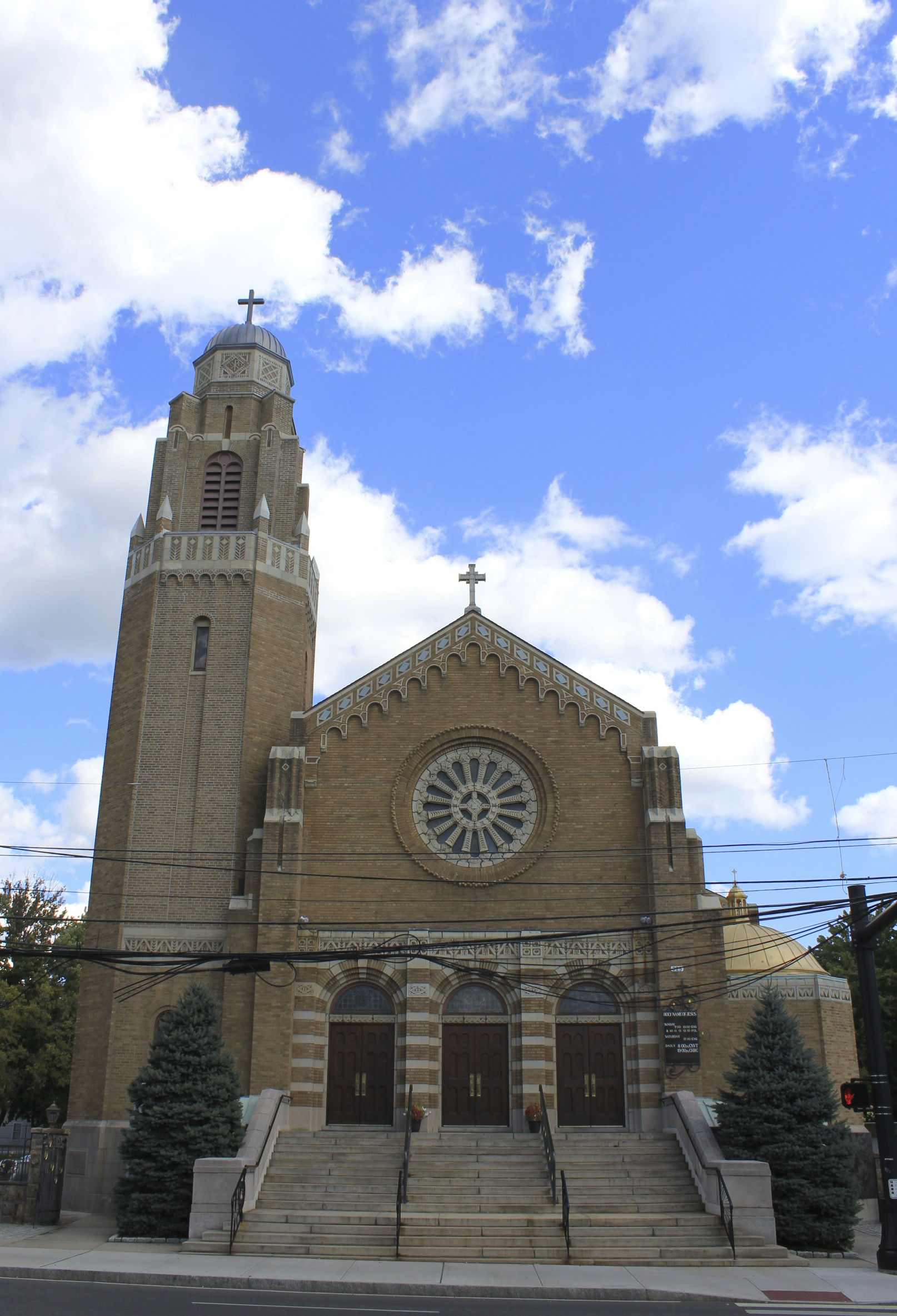
- Holy Name of Jesus Parish
- 41°02′39.4″N 73°32′33.7″W
- Location: 4 Pulaski Street and 325 Washington Boulevard, Stamford, Connecticut
- Country: United States
- Denomination: Roman Catholic
- Website: holynamestamford.org

History
- Founded: July 19, 1903
- Founder: Polish immigrants
- Dedication: Holy Name of Jesus
- Consecrated: August 23. 1925

Administration
- Province: Hartford
- Diocese: Bridgeport

Clergy
- Archbishop: Most Rev. Leonard Paul Blair
- Bishop: Most Rev. Frank Joseph Caggiano
- Pastor: Rev. Fr. Pawel Hrebenko

Holy Name of Jesus Parish is a church in Stamford, Connecticut, United States, founded on July 19, 1903. It is one of the Polish-American Roman Catholic parishes in New England in the Diocese of Bridgeport. Holy Name of Jesus Church is the second oldest Catholic Church in Stamford.

== History ==
The first building acquired by the parish was the 1852 Duncan Phyfe House, located at 4 Pulaski Street. This fine Italianate house was home to Duncan Phyfe, a noted cabinetmaker. The existing church was built in 1925 to plans supplied by architect Henry F. Ludorf of Hartford, Connecticut. The parochial school, which had been closed, was re-opened by the Bernadine Sisters from Reading, Pennsylvania. Work on Holy Name of Jesus started on April 5, 1925. The same year, on August 23, Bishop Nilan consecrated the cornerstone of the church. On Easter Sunday, 1927 the mass was celebrated in the lower part of the church because the upper church was not completed. The work was slow, but steady. Following the financial crash of 1929, the Rev. Wladasz continued work on the church. On December 25, 1934 the first mass was celebrated in the completed upper portion of the church.

The parochial school, located just west of the church, was built in 1929, and the convent, on the other side of the church, was added in 1956. The entire complex was listed on the National Register of Historic Places in 1987.

== Pastors ==
- Rev. Fr. Zdislaw Luczycki (1903 to 1906)
- Rev. Fr. Ignacy Krusinski (1906 to 1910)
- Rev. Fr. Jozef Raniszewski (1910 to 1917)
- Rev. Fr. Ludwik Rusin (1917 to 1922)
- Rt. Rev. Msgr. Francis Wladasz (1922 to 1959)
- Rev. Fr. Felix Werpechowski (1959 to 1971)
- Rt. Rev. Msgr. Alphonse Fiedorczyk (1971 to 1985)
- Rev. Fr. Stanley Koziol (1985 to 1987)
- Rev. Fr. Sherman Gray (1987 to 2003)
- Rev. Fr. Stanislaw Stanieszewski C.M. (2003 to 2008)
- Rev. Fr. Eugene Kotlinski C.M. (2008 to 2012)
- Rev. Fr. Pawel M. Hrebenko (2012–2025)
- Rev. Fr. Leszek Szymaszek (2025–Present)

== See also ==
- National Register of Historic Places listings in Stamford, Connecticut

== Bibliography ==
- Bonarigo, Anthony V. (2004). Holy Name of Jesus Parish centennial album - years 1903-2003. Stamford, Connecticut: Holy Name of Jesus Parish.
- The 150th Anniversary of Polish-American Pastoral Ministry. Webster, Massachusetts: St. Joseph Basilica. September 11, 2005.
- Kruszka, Waclaw (1998). A History of the Poles in America to 1908. Washington, D.C.: The Catholic University of America Press - Part III: Poles in the Eastern and Southern States.
- The Official Catholic Directory in USA
