= Zion Lutheran Church (Stamford, Connecticut) =

Historic church in Connecticut, United States

- Zion Lutheran Church; Mision Pentecostal John 3:16
- U.S. National Register of Historic Places
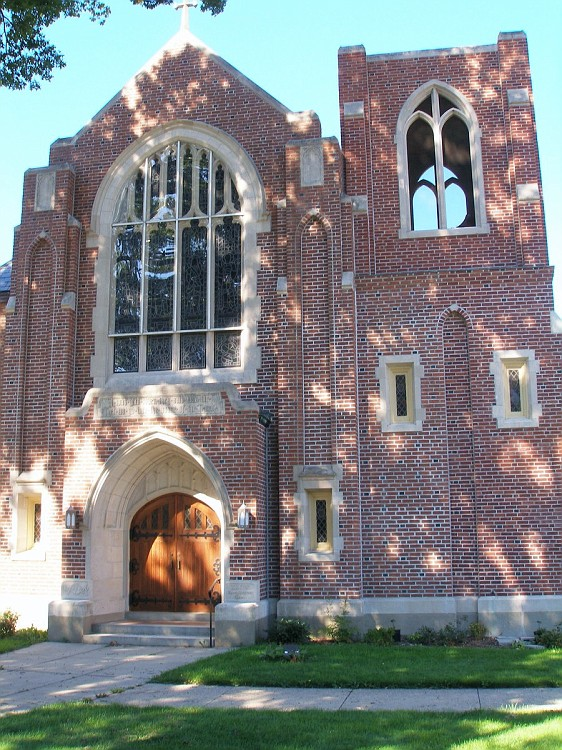

- Location within Connecticut Location within the United States
- Location: 132 Glenbrook Road, Stamford, Connecticut
- Coordinates: 41°3′35″N 73°31′39″W
- Area: less than one acre
- Built: 1925
- Architectural style: Late Gothic Revival
- MPS: Downtown Stamford Ecclesiastical Complexes TR
- NRHP reference No.: 87002127
- Added to NRHP: December 24, 1987

The Zion Lutheran Church (now known as Mision Pentecostal John 3:16) is a historic Lutheran church building at 132 Glenbrook Road in Stamford, Connecticut. The red brick Gothic Revival structure was built in 1925 by a German immigrant congregation founded in 1897. It is the city's only red brick church. The main facade is dominated by a square tower on the right, which rises only to the height of the roof gable on the left. The gable stands above a large quadruple window set in a slightly pointed arch, which stands above the main entrance, which is recessed in an arched opening.

The property was added to the National Register of Historic Places in 1987. After a long decline in attendance and membership, the building was sold to a Spanish-speaking Pentecostal congregation, and the Lutheran church ceased its existence in 2021.

== See also ==
- National Register of Historic Places listings in Stamford, Connecticut
