= United States Post Office–Stamford Main =

- US Post Office–Stamford Main
- U.S. National Register of Historic Places
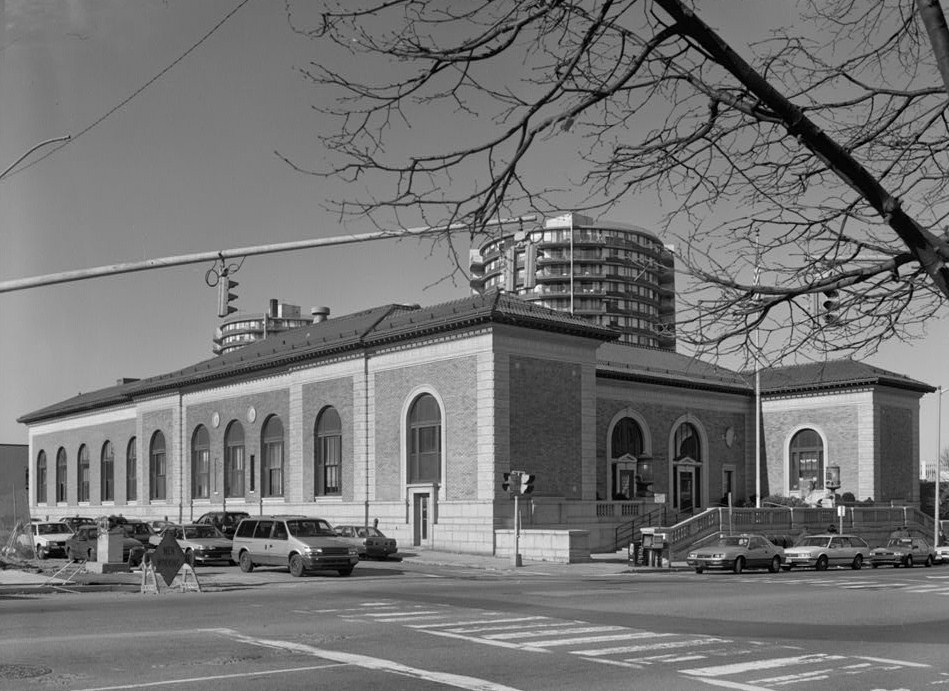
- Stamford Post Office

- Location within Connecticut Location within the United States
- Location: 421 Atlantic Street, Stamford, Connecticut
- Coordinates: 41°2′59″N 73°32′22″W
- Area: 1 acre (0.40 ha)
- Built: 1916
- Built by: Charles McCaul Company
- Architect: Oscar Wenderoth
- Architectural style: Italianate
- NRHP reference No.: 85003328
- Added to NRHP: December 12, 1985

The Stamford Main Post Office, also known as US Post Office–Stamford Main, is a historic post office building at 421 Atlantic Street in Stamford, Connecticut. Completed in 1916, the building is unusual for its Italianate style of architecture. It was listed on the National Register of Historic Places in 1985.

== History ==
The Stamford Main Post Office is located at 421 Atlantic Street in Stamford, Connecticut. It was designed in 1914 and built in 1915 and 1916 on prominent sited in downtown Stamford, in view of the Connecticut Turnpike. The building "set the tone" for future buildings on Atlantic Street. It was listed on the National Register of Historic Places on December 12, 1985.

In 2012, the Center for Art and Mindfulness Inc. filed a suit in the Federal District Court preventing the sale of the Stamford Post Office to a developer. Judge Arterton upheld the Injunction, and a sixteen-month trial produced some important changes in the sale of national assets to the highest bidder. Additionally, the court's ruling makes a clear case for leverage with the United States Postal Service and advocacy for the responsibility of preservation covenants.

The National Trust for Historic Preservation cited the site as one of ten historic sites saved in 2013.

== Architecture ==
The Stamford Main Post Office was designed by the Office of the Supervising Architect of the Treasury Department, headed by Oscar Wenderoth. It was one of the last post offices designed in an individual or unique style.

The building is unusual for its Italianate and eclectic Neo-Renaissance style of architecture. The post office is constructed of buff-colored masonry glazed polychrome terra cotta tiles, and a red clay tile roof. It features a raised entrance plaza, bracketed projecting wooden eaves, arched bays, and a hipped roof. It has ornamental bronze and glass lanterns.

== Gallery ==
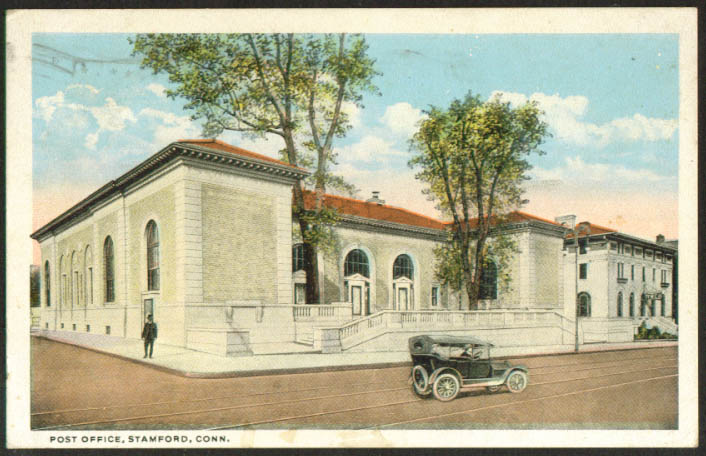
The building is shown in a historic postcard, which is identified as being postmarked in 1911. Note the discrepancy vs. the 1916 construction date, however.

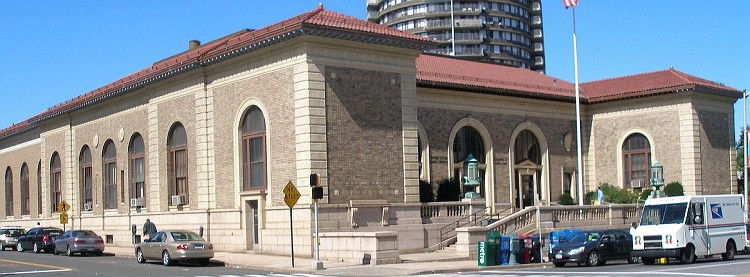
View in 2006

== See also ==
- National Register of Historic Places listings in Stamford, Connecticut
- List of United States post offices
