= Shippan Point =

Neighborhood of Stamford, Connecticut, USA

Coordinates: 41.0261°N 73.5233°W

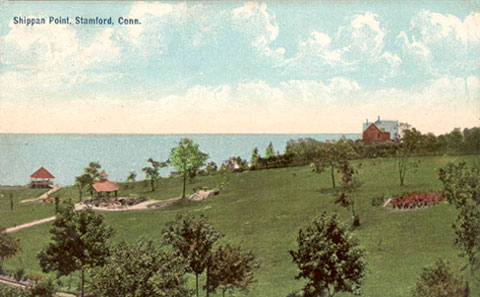
A postcard c. 1908.

Shippan Point (or Shippan) is the southernmost neighborhood in Stamford, Connecticut, United States, located on a peninsula in Long Island Sound. Street names such as Ocean Drive West and Lighthouse Way reflect the neighborhood's shoreline location. It is one of the wealthiest neighborhoods in the city, with about 1100 homes (including condominiums).

Many of the community's large homes overlook the water and have private beaches. Bordering Shippan Point to the northeast is the Shippan neighborhood of Stamford, and farther east the East Side neighborhood. To the west of Shippan Point, separated from it by a canal, is the South End neighborhood, which is currently in planning phases for a major redevelopment.

Running down the middle of the peninsula, Shippan Avenue is the main road of the community. Several of the cross streets end in private beaches owned by neighborhood associations.

Some local historians say "Shippan" means "the shore where the sea begins." but others say the meaning of the Indian name is lost.

== Marion Castle ==
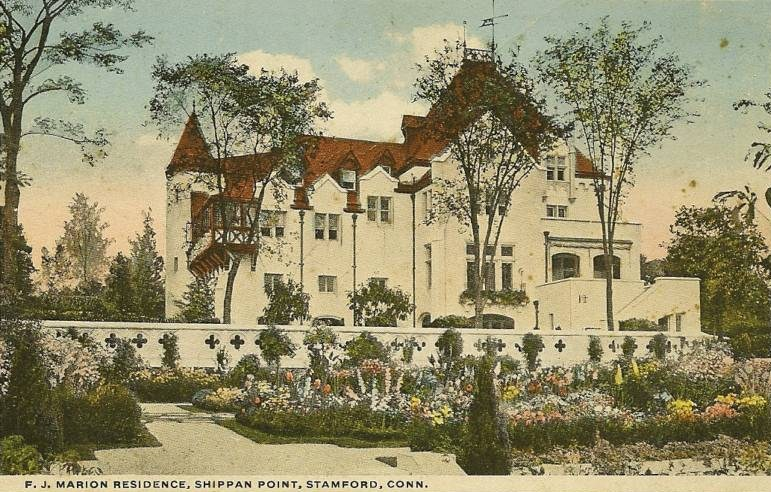
Marion Castle

A waterfront mansion known as Marion Castle (One Rogers Road) is listed on the National Register of Historic Places. It was built, owned and occupied by the family of Frank Marion until his death in 1963. The house was designed by the noted New York City based firm of Richard Howland Hunt and Joseph Howland Hunt, working as Hunt & Hunt. The Hunt brothers were sons of the "dean of American architecture" Richard Morris Hunt. Marion's Castle as it became known was designed in the style of a French chateau completed in either 1914 (according to an October 2, 2005, New York Times article) or in 1916 ("completed in 1916," according to a July 2006 article in New Canaan/Darien Magazine) Frank J. Marion was a movie industry pioneer who with partners in the Kalem Company produced silent one-reelers shown at nickelodeons. Since 1998 the pile has been owned and occupied by Thomas L. Rich, a Stamford real estate developer well known in the area. Mr. Rich has allowed the usage of the home extensively for non-profit community events.

== The Hotel Chesterfield ==
The house at 1404 Shippan Avenue, built around 1880, was operated as a hotel and/or rooming house (under the names Chesterfield Inn, The Shippan Point Inn and Chesterfield House) for more than a century. It was extensively renovated in 2005-2007 by Shippan Point resident John Ruddy. Ruddy opened the business as The Hotel Chesterfield in 2007 as a 9-room boutique hotel. He sold the business to Stamford developer and Shippan Point resident Thomas L. Rich in June 2008. Rich ran the hotel for two years but after being unable to secure a license to serve liquor at the property, Rich closed the hotel and sold it. In 2010 the building was sold as a single-family home.

== Organizations and businesses on Shippan Point ==
Shippan Point is home to two yacht clubs, two restaurants, a marina, a private beach club, and a rock climbing gym. They are the Stamford Yacht Club; the Halloween Yacht Club; Brewer Yacht Haven East, a branch of the New England marina chain Brewer Yacht Yards and the Woodway Beach Club. Community groups include the Shippan Point Association, the Shippan Gourmet Club (which sponsors dinners at members' homes six times a year), the Shippan Point Garden Club, and West Beach Neighborhood Coalition.

Our Lady Star of the Sea Church (Roman Catholic) is located on Shippan Avenue. The church was established August 21, 1964, and the current building opened January 15, 1989. It formerly included a parochial school but portions of the school are now leased by Stamford Recreation for its Star Center. Programming includes a summer camp, after-school activities, and classes for kids and adults.

Shippan Point has three restaurants: Brennan's, on Iroquois Road, a bar and casual restaurant, The New Olive Branch at 703 Shippan Avenue, and the Stamford Yacht club.

Other nearby restaurants include Café Silvium at 371 Shippan Avenue, an award-winning Italian Restaurant; and a larger Italian restaurant, Tomato Tomato, at 401 Shippan Avenue.

== "Shippan Shuffle" ==
It is common for residents to move from one home to another in the neighborhood. The practice has been called the "Shippan Shuffle." "It's not unusual for people to have lived in more than one house here," a near-lifelong resident said. "In fact, there are probably 100 people here now who have done that."

== History ==
=== Up to the American Revolution ===
Stamford, once known as Rippowam, was sold by the native Indians to the English settlers. One such deed of July 1, 1640, acknowledges the sale of land to Nathanael Turner of Quenepiocke in exchange for one dozen each of coats, hoes, hatchets, glasses, knives, two kettles and four "fathom of white wampum." The deed bears the marks of Ponus Sagamore of Toquams, his son Owenoke Sagamore, as well as Wascussue Sagamore of Shippan.

For the next 50 years the English settlers tended to the corn fields, each being responsible for a five-rail fence. By the end of the 17th century, the land was divided into very precise quantities as determined by the landowners at their town meetings. Early settlers included the Ambers, Beldings, Hoyts, Jaggers, Pettits, Waterburys and Weeds.

Belding's Bluff, at the southeastern tip of the peninsula, was once a farm of over 100 acres (0.40 km^{2}). When Benjamin Belding died in 1741, his children sold off part of the farm to John Lloyd, a ship owner and operator of a general store at the mouth of the Mill River. Lloyd's father owned the section of Long Island known as Lloyd's Neck, which was occupied by the British during the American Revolution. On the night of September 5, 1779, Colonel Benjamin Tallmadge led a force of 130 men from Shippan Point to Lloyd's Neck, where the surprised Tories surrendered. Several years later, Talmadge was told of a loyalist troop movement on eastern L.I. Talmadge wrote George Washington for permission to cut off the detachment. Once again Shippan was chosen as the site of embarkation, but two days of stormy winter weather thwarted the mission.

=== Nineteenth century ===
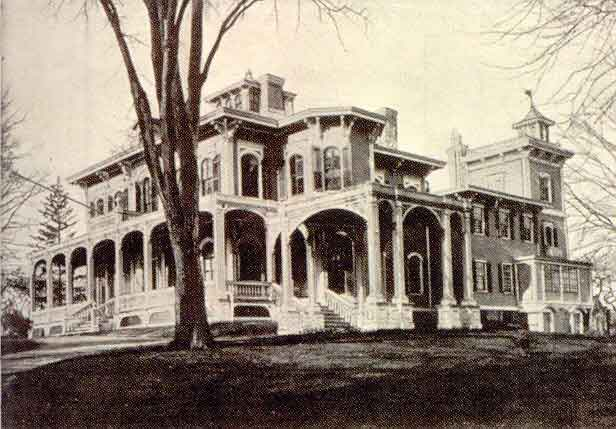
Lowe-Heywood School at Shippan Point, 1883. The school moved elsewhere in Shippan Point in 1911.

After the Revolutionary War, several large farms of 100 acres (0.40 km^{2}) or more flourished on Shippan. In 1799 Moses Rogers paid $8,000 for 102 acres (0.41 km^{2}). In 1800 he purchased 74 acres (300,000 m^{2}) additional for $2,791. In 1806 he purchased the Waterbury farm for $10,000 bringing his land holdings to over 400 acres (1.6 km^{2}) and eventually owning the entire southern part of the point.

Rogers, a wealthy merchant, formed a partnership with William Walton Woolsey in 1792. Rogers was a director of the First Bank of the United States in 1793, governor of New York Hospital from 1792 to 1797, and a supporter of the New York Society for the Manumission of Slaves. In 1792, Moses Rogers married Sarah Woolsey, sister-in-law of one-time Yale College president Timothy Dwight. In 1812, Rogers built a European styled mansion on the east side of Shippan Avenue, a few hundred feet from where Ocean Drive East is today. A description of the estate can be found in Timothy Dwight's Travels In New England And New York (1822):

Timothy Dwight, president of Yale College.

Another is a peninsula on the east side of the harbor, mentioned above under the name of Shippan, the property of Moses Rogers, Esq., of the city of New York. This also is an elegant and fertile piece of ground. The surface slopes in every direction, and is encircled by a collection of exquisite scenery. The Sound, and Long Island beyond it, with a gracefully indented shore, are directly in front, and both stretch westward to a vast distance and eastward till the eye is lost. On each side also lies a harbor bounded by handsome points. A train of groves and bushy island, peculiarly pleasing in themselves, increase by their interruptions the beauty of these waters. The farm itself is a delightful object, with its fields neatly enclosed, its orchards, and its groves. Here Mr. Rogers has formed an avenue, a mile in length, reaching quite to the waters edge. At the same time, he has united plantations of fruit trees, a rich garden, and other interesting objects, so combined as to make this one of the pleasantest retreats in the United States.

Rogers brought in Royal L. Gay from Stafford Springs, CT, to manage the estate. Gay was Stafford's selectman and treasurer for years and was also representative to the State Legislature. When Moses Rogers died in 1825, he left his estate to two sons, a daughter, and several grandchildren, brothers and nephews, who administered the estate until the end of the century. The mansion house and surrounding buildings were leased to Isaac Bragg for $400 a year. Bragg was told to protect the garden and specimen plantings, especially in the area south of the house, known as "The Park." Bragg ran a boarding school on the estate until it fell into disrepair. New tenant S.E. Lawrence restored the property which became a popular picnic area in the summer months, peaking on a day in 1845 with over 500 people.

After the last surviving child of Moses Rogers died in 1866, the first of many public auctions of Shippan land took place. Sally Scofield placed the highest bid of $980 for 10 acres (40,000 m^{2}) in the middle of the peninsula. Hundreds of people attended the auctions, and in 1869, Harpers Weekly printed a few scenes of the area. A year later, the Rogers' estate distributed a booklet describing the property. In the 1870s the estate was divided into 400 lots and new streets were made. Two of the streets were named after Rogers' grandchildren: Van Rensselaer and Verplanck. It was not until 1913 that Rogers' own name was used as a street name.

In 1885 several large plots of land on the southeastern shore were sold for about $2,000 each. That same year Colonel Woolsey Rogers Hopkins, son of Sarah Elizabeth Hopkins, and grandson of Moses Rogers, paid $8,000 for several land parcels south of the Ocean House hotel. In 1887, Colonel Hopkins built the large mansion at 192 Ocean Drive East. As first president of the Stamford Historical Society, he often entertained its members at his "Holiday House." Early in the 20th century the house was sold to the Andrus family, who continued to own it until the end of the century.

As part of the promotion of Shippan, a large hotel was built in 1870, called The Ocean House. It stood on Hobson Street, where the Woodway Beach Club is today. To encourage New York City residents to visit the area, a steamer, the Shippan, was built in 1866. The Panic of 1873 caused a collapse in the market, which did not recover until the 1880s. Another promotional scheme was the building of the Ocean House Hotel, where potential buyers could stay to get a feel for the area.

=== Resort ===
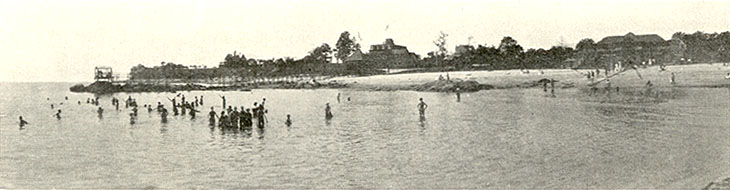
"SHIPPAN POINT HOTEL AND BATHING PAVILION Where the beach is of hard white sand." From The Guide to Nature Magazine, June 1910 issue

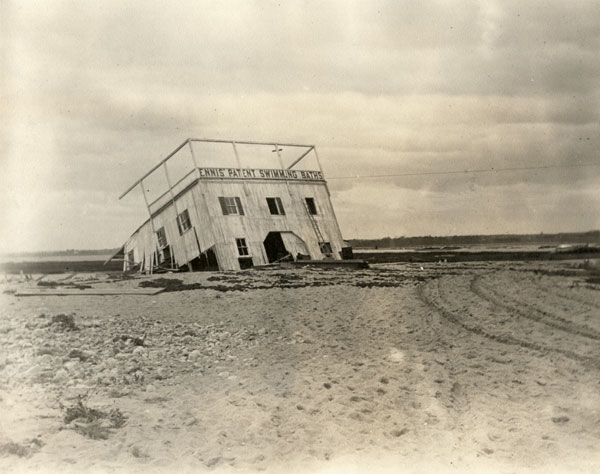
The wreck of Ennis' bathing pavilion, after an October 1916 storm.

The late nineteenth century and early twentieth century were the heyday of Shippan as a summer resort, both for Stamford residents and others who owned or rented summer cottages or stayed at the Ocean House Hotel. "When Michael McDevitt bought it, he renamed it 'Shippan House'." By 1890, he had added a pavilion, bath houses, a casino, and a carousel from Asbury Park, New Jersey. It was situated at the spot where later the Woodway Beach Club was built. The Hotel was renovated in 1911 by Leonard Barsaghi."

In 1887 John Ennis bought land at the southwest end of the point and built a bathing pavilion over the water, where people could swim beneath a roof. He also put in ball fields, and a shed for 150 horses, which was too small to meet demand.

With Stamford Harbor on the west-side of the point, and Westcott Cove to the east, boats were plentiful in the summer months. The Rev. Henry Codman Potter's yacht Pearl was one of the more impressive sights at Stamford Harbor. A new steamer ship, The Shippan, was built in 1866. Some of these vessels ferried passengers to the newly opened Shippan resorts of Ennis and McDeavitt. The racetrack at the northeast end of the peninsula brought even more visitors, so in 1892 the Stamford Street Railway began trolley service to Shippan.

The Stamford Yacht Club was formed in 1890, and the following year, William A. Lottimer was named its first Commodore. The 4 acres (16,000 m^{2}) on the western shore were developed by N.W. Barrett of Bridgeport. The club boasted the pleasures of yachting, bathing, tennis, croquet, concerts and receptions. A fire destroyed the original clubhouse in 1913, but within a year a new structure had taken its place.

=== Early 20th century ===
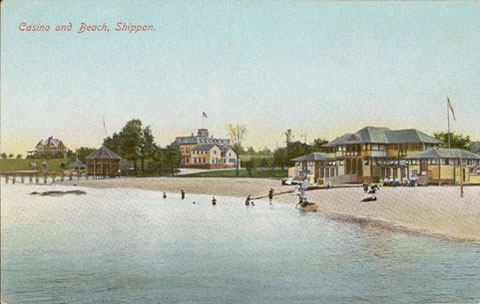
Early twentieth century postcard of Shippan Point

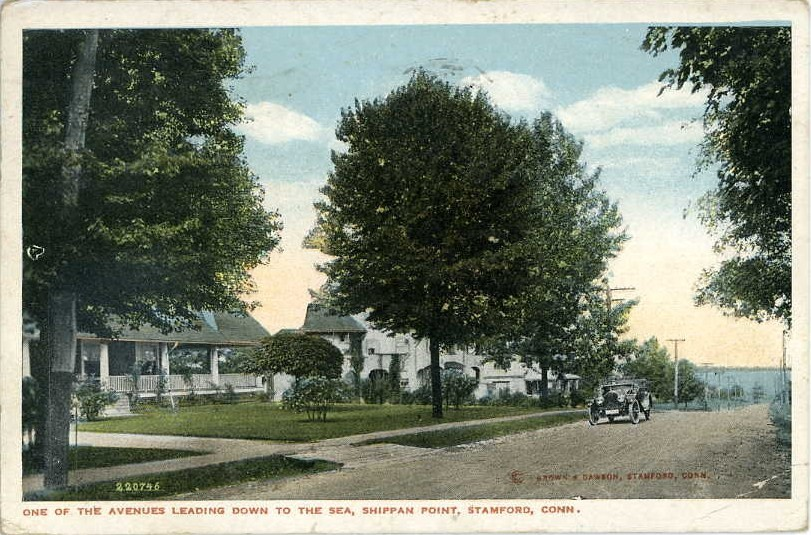
A Shippan Point street scene, about 1920

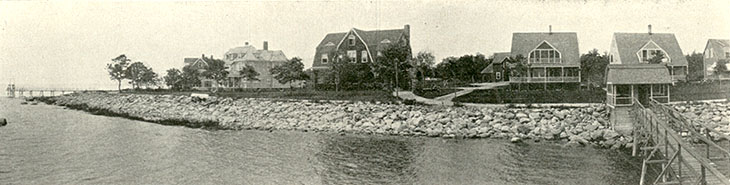
From The Guide to Nature Magazine, June 1910 issue. Caption reads: COTTAGES ON THE EXTREME END OF SHIPPAN POINT The large house in the centre is the home of Robert H. Fosdick."

In 1887, John Ennis bought land at the southwest end of the point and erected a bathing pavilion in the water. Waders could enjoy the refreshing salt water without the worry of sunburn. Some of the grounds were cleared for playing fields, and the shed for 150 horses soon became inadequate for the number of people coming there. Between 1891 and 1893 many meetings for of Stamford Common Council were held to discuss the sale of Ennis' Park to the town. On Halloween night in 1906, Mayor Homer Cummings cast the deciding vote that turned the 95 acres (380,000 m^{2}) of land into a public park. The park, originally called Halloween Park, was developed by civil engineer George Stadel. In 1916 a nine-hole golf course was built there, and later it was renamed Cummings Park.

In 1899 the Moses Rogers house was purchased by the Fosdick Syndicate, later called the Shippan Manor Company. L.D. Marriott opened the Manor School there. A three-story dormitory was added in 1902, which later became home to the Stamford Military Academy. Years later it became the Massee School. A new building was built on the west side of Shippan Avenue, and in 1911 it became the school of Miss Low and Miss Heywood. At about this time Leonard Barsaghi bought and renovated the Shippan House and the casino on the eastern shore.

Real estate continued to flourish, and James Jenkins of the Shippan Land Company developed over 100 acres (0.40 km^{2}) of Shippan property. They brought in landfill, and in 1913 opened the new roads of Saddle Rock and Rogers. One year later, Frank J. Marion, a producer of the early "one-reeler" silent films, had a castle built at 1 Rogers Road. Marion Castle was designed by the architectural firm Hunt and Hunt of New York City. When Frank Marion died in 1963, at 96, the property was sold to Martha and David Cogan. Martha was renowned for saving many children from Hitler, and David was an inventor and leader in the development of radio and television, helping to develop the first color television tube for CBS. In 1978, Jay Kobrin and Gordon Micunis of Gordon Micunis Designs purchased Marion Castle. They were influential in placing it on the National Register of Historic Places.

The neighborhood continued to be developed in the early twentieth century. The Shippan Land Company developed over 100 acres (0.40 km^{2}) of the peninsula, including Saddle Rock and Rogers Roads in 1913. The Atlantic Realty Company held a large public auction of land in 1914 at Lanark, Auldwood, Downs, and Whittaker avenues. The company even offered three-minute airplane rides to attract prospective buyers.

Shippan residents complained about city services (it wasn't until 1931 that Shippan Avenue was paved) and zoning decisions, and the area once petitioned the state legislature to separate from Stamford and become its own town, although the petition was rejected.

=== Off-shore wreck ===
The Isabel, a wooden passenger steamship, ran aground off the point on 28 September 1915. There were no fatalities. Scattered wreckage remains in the 20-foot (6.1 m)-deep area. There are believed to be small parts of the ship, like windows, buried only a few feet below the sand at the beach at Stamford Yacht Club.

== Notable residents ==
Current residents include newscaster Chris Hansen and Stamford developer, Thomas L. Rich.

Past residents of Shippan Point include:

- Mary Beth Barone, actress and stand-up comedian
- Harry Connick Jr.
- Faye Dunaway
- The family of the Gillespie brothers, former publishers of The Advocate of Stamford and the Greenwich Time, and owners of radio station WSTC.
- U.S. Rep. Schuyler Merritt, who chaired the commission that created the Merritt Parkway, lived at 75 Rogers Road.
- Timothy Donahue was the Executive Chairman of Sprint Nextel.
- Daniel Malloy, CT governor, former mayor of Stamford

== Pictures ==
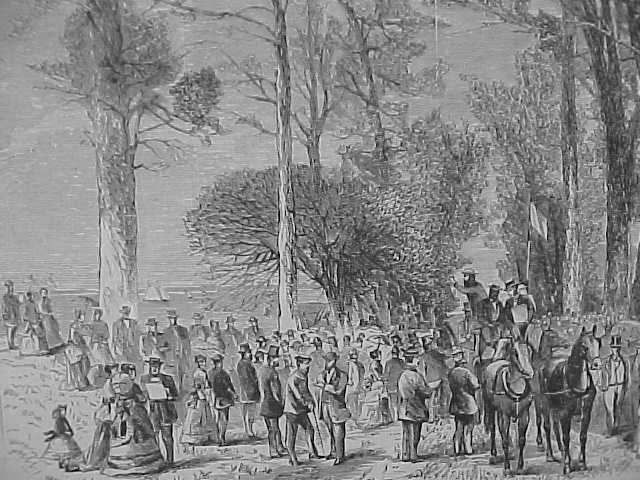
Land auction, 1869

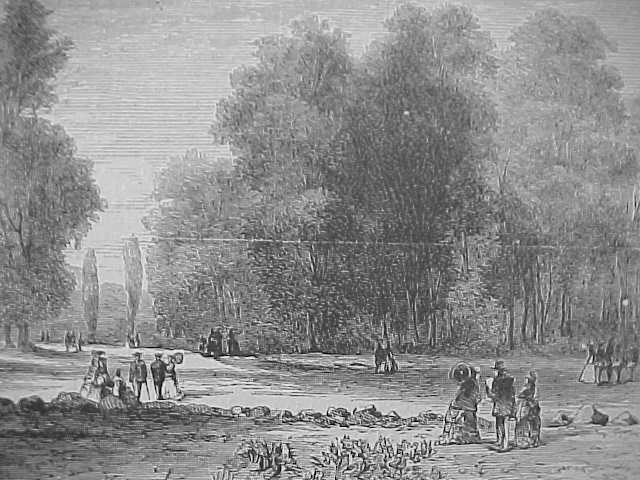
Visitors inspecting land before an 1869 auction

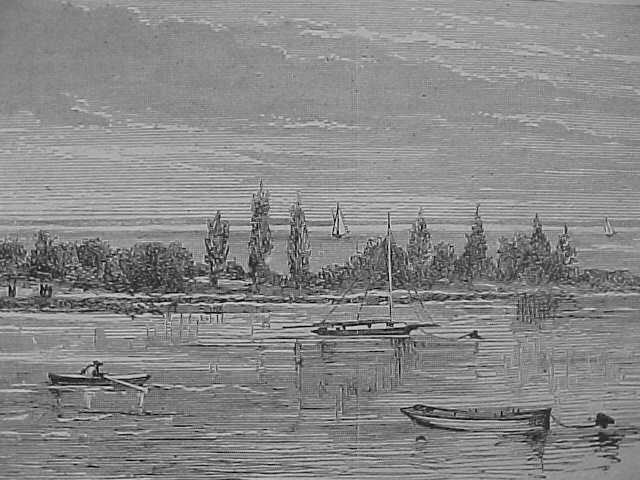
Part of illustration "View of Shippan Point", 1869
