= Hait =

Hait may refer to:

- Hoit, Tajikistan
- Hit, Qasr-e Qand, a village in Iran
- Benjamin Hait House in Stamford, Connecticut, United States
- Paul Hait (born 1940), American swimmer
- Thaddeus Hait Farm in Plattekill, New York, United States
