= St. Benedict's Church (Stamford, Connecticut) =

Historic church in Connecticut, United States

- U.S. National Register of Historic Places
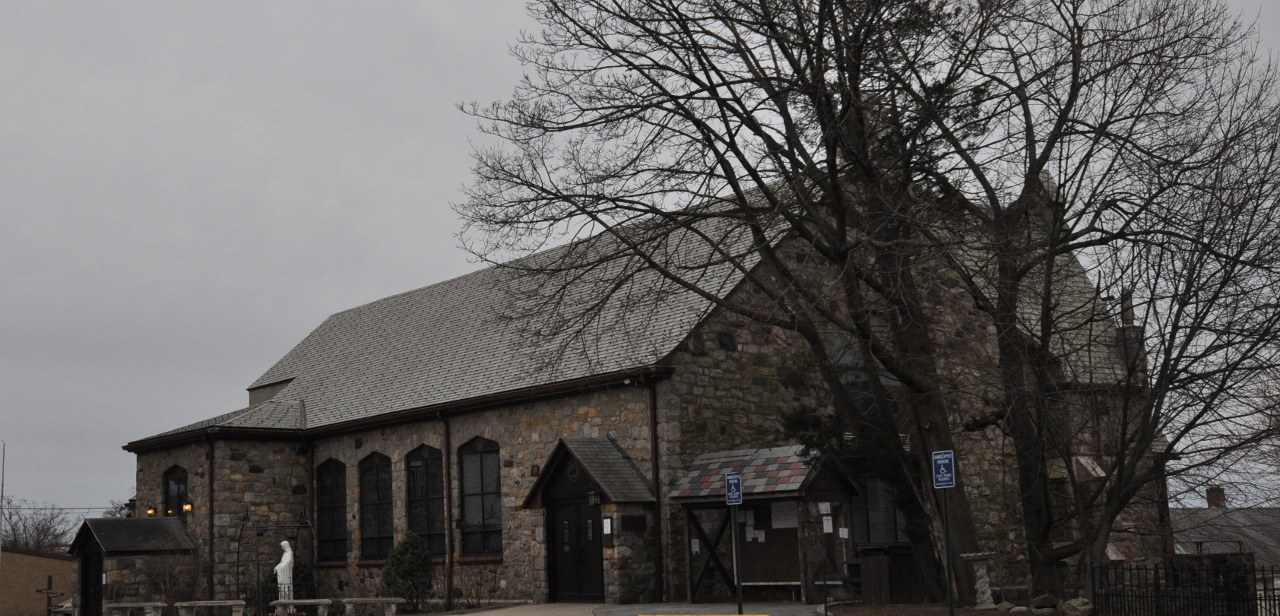

- Location within Connecticut Location within the United States
- Location: 1A St. Benedict's Circle, Stamford, Connecticut
- Coordinates: 41°3′6″N 73°31′14″W
- Area: less than one acre
- Built: 1930
- Architectural style: Neo-Tudor
- MPS: Downtown Stamford Ecclesiastical Complexes TR
- NRHP reference No.: 87002130
- Added to NRHP: December 24, 1987

Saint Benedict - Our Lady of Montserrat, or simply St. Benedict's Church, is a Catholic church in Stamford, Connecticut, in the Diocese of Bridgeport. The historic brick Neo-Tudor church at 1A St. Benedict's Circle was built in 1930 and added to the National Register of Historic Places in 1987. The architect was Henry F. Ludorf of Hartford, Connecticut. The exterior uses a variety of building materials, including brick, ashlar stone, timbering, and stucco. The church's main facade is asymmetrically arranged with its entrance on the left, under a handsome timber-frame porch, and a stone tower to the right which is topped by a bell-cot roof.

== See also ==
- National Register of Historic Places listings in Stamford, Connecticut
