= C. J. Starr Barn and Carriage House =

- U.S. National Register of Historic Places
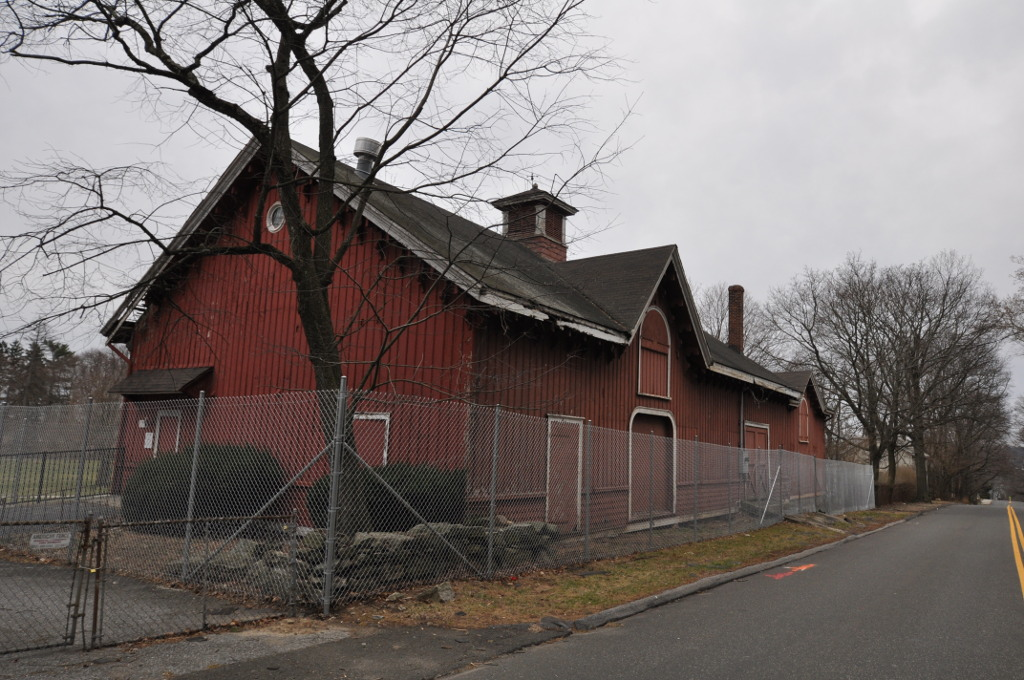

- Location within Connecticut Location within the United States
- Location: 200 Strawberry Hill Avenue, Stamford, Connecticut
- Coordinates: 41°4′3″N 73°32′6″W
- Area: less than one acre
- Built: 1889
- NRHP reference No.: 79002623
- Added to NRHP: September 14, 1979

The C. J. Starr Barn and Carriage House is an historic estate outbuilding, located on the grounds of the former Sacred Heart Academy on Strawberry Hill Road in Stamford, Connecticut. It is a large 1 1/2-story wood-frame structure with elegant Italianate scrolled woodwork on the exterior, with a smaller barn joined to a larger building that originally functioned as a carriage house. They were built c. 1860 by C. J. Starr has part of a larger country estate, of which these are the only surviving buildings. The estate was given to the Sacred Heart Academy, which has done sensitive restoration of the exterior of the structure; its interior has been converted into a gymnasium and other facilities.

The building was listed on the National Register of Historic Places on September 14, 1979.

== See also ==
- National Register of Historic Places listings in Fairfield County, Connecticut
