= Marion Castle =

Historic house in Connecticut, United States

- U.S. National Register of Historic Places
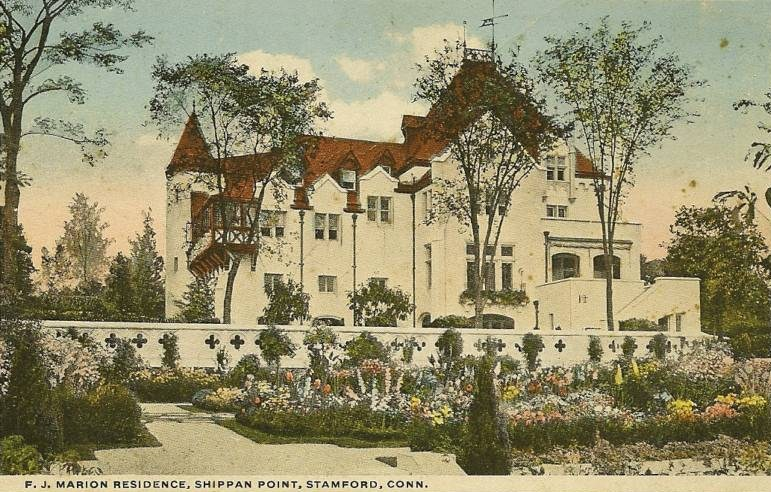

- Location within Connecticut Location within the United States
- Location: 1 Rogers Road, Stamford, Connecticut
- Coordinates: 41°1′23″N 73°31′45″W
- Area: 1.7 acres (0.69 ha)
- Built: 1914
- Architect: Hunt, Joseph Howland
- Architectural style: Renaissance, Chateauesque
- NRHP reference No.: 82004341
- Added to NRHP: July 1, 1982

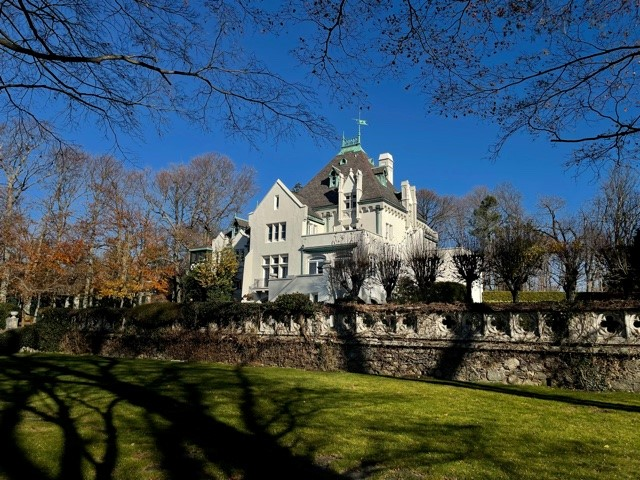
Photo by Thomas L. Rich, December 2021

The Marion Castle, also known as Terre Bonne, is located at 1 Rogers Road in the Shippan Point section of Stamford, Connecticut. It was built in 1914 and was added to the National Register of Historic Places on July 1, 1982.

Marion Castle was built, owned and occupied by the family of Frank Marion until his death in 1963. The home was designed by the noted New York City-based architectural firm of Hunt & Hunt, which was owned at the time by Joseph Howland Hunt and Richard Howland Hunt. Marion Castle was designed in the style of a French chateau completed in either 1914 (according to an October 2, 2005, New York Times article) or 1916 ("completed in 1916", according to a July 2006 article in New Canaan/Darien Magazine). Frank J. Marion was a movie industry pioneer who with partners in the Kalem Company produced one-reelers shown at nickelodeons and later silent films. Since 1998 the pile has been owned and occupied by Thomas L. Rich, a Stamford real estate developer well known in the area. Rich has allowed the usage of the home extensively for non-profit community events.

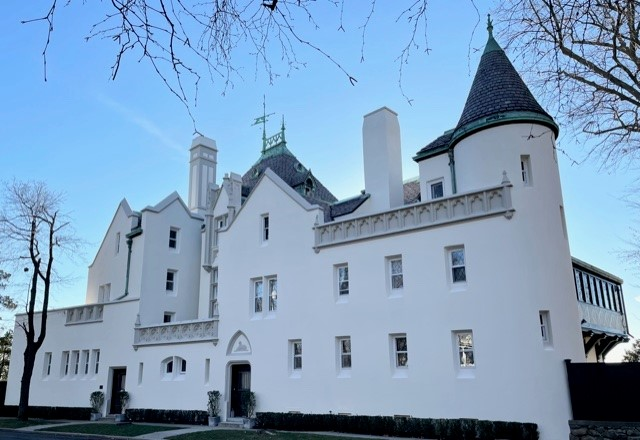
Photo by Thomas L. Rich, December 2021

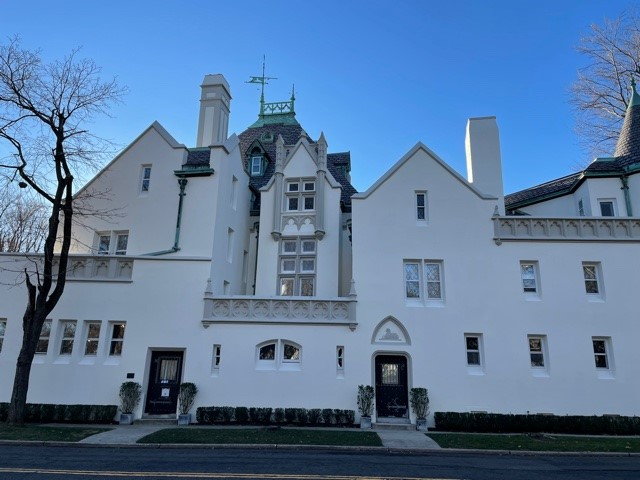
Photo by Thomas L. Rich, December 2021

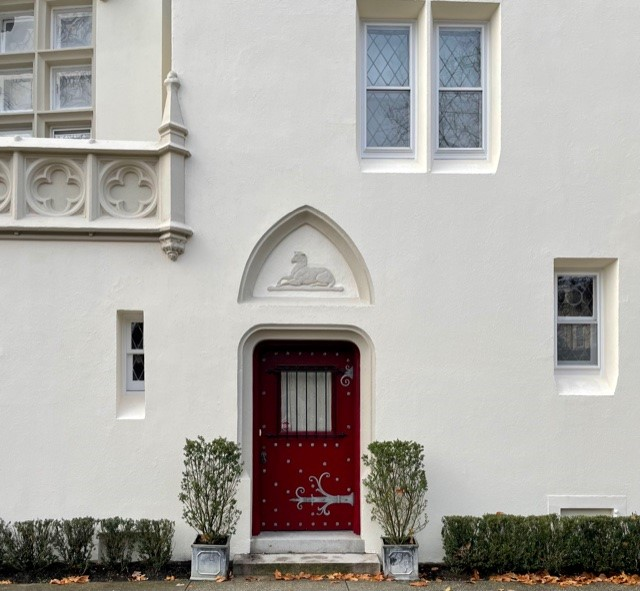
Photo by Thomas L. Rich, December 2021

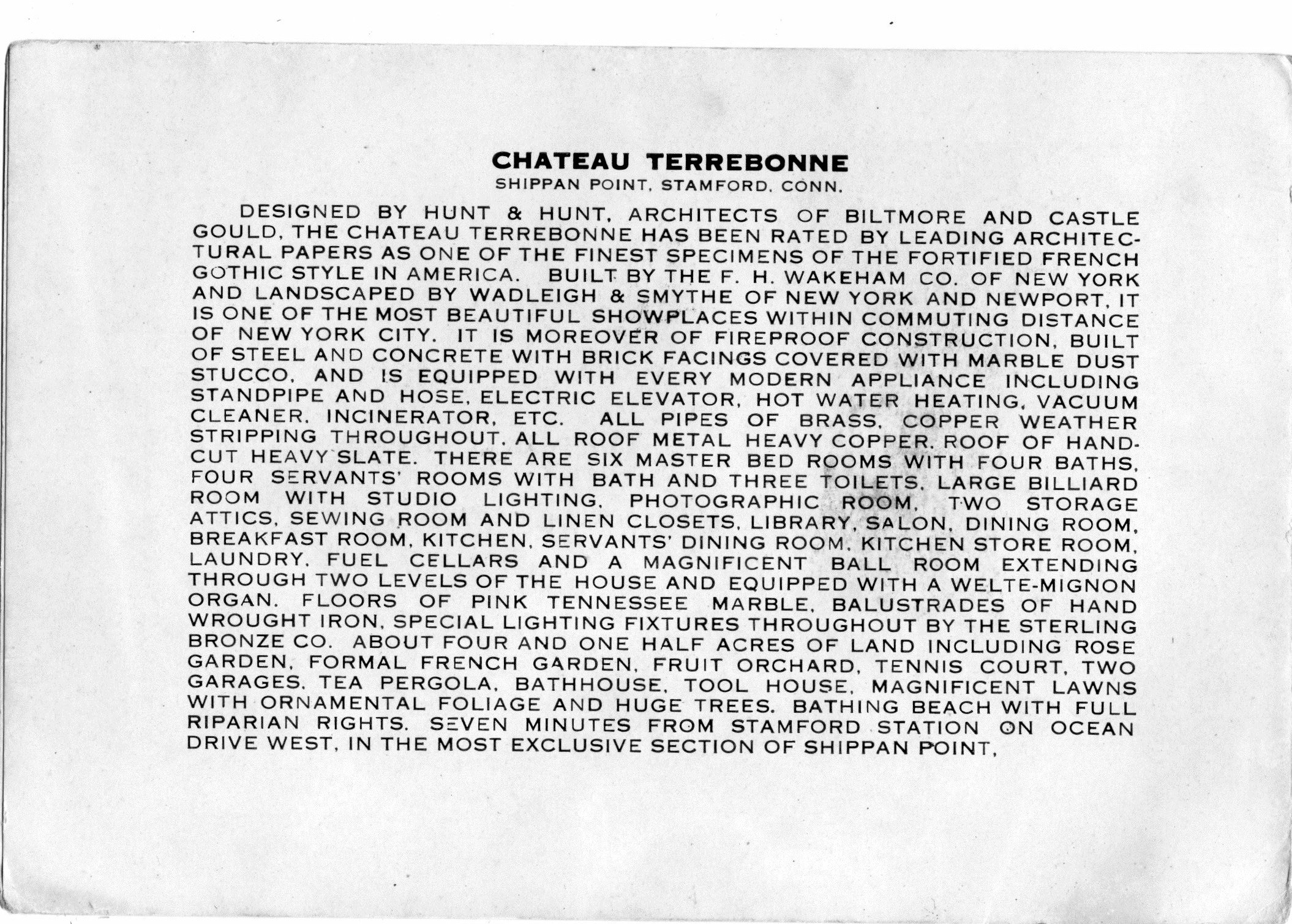
Scan by Rich Ackerman, May 2023

== See also ==
- National Register of Historic Places listings in Fairfield County, Connecticut
