= Cove Island Park =

Park in Connecticut, United States

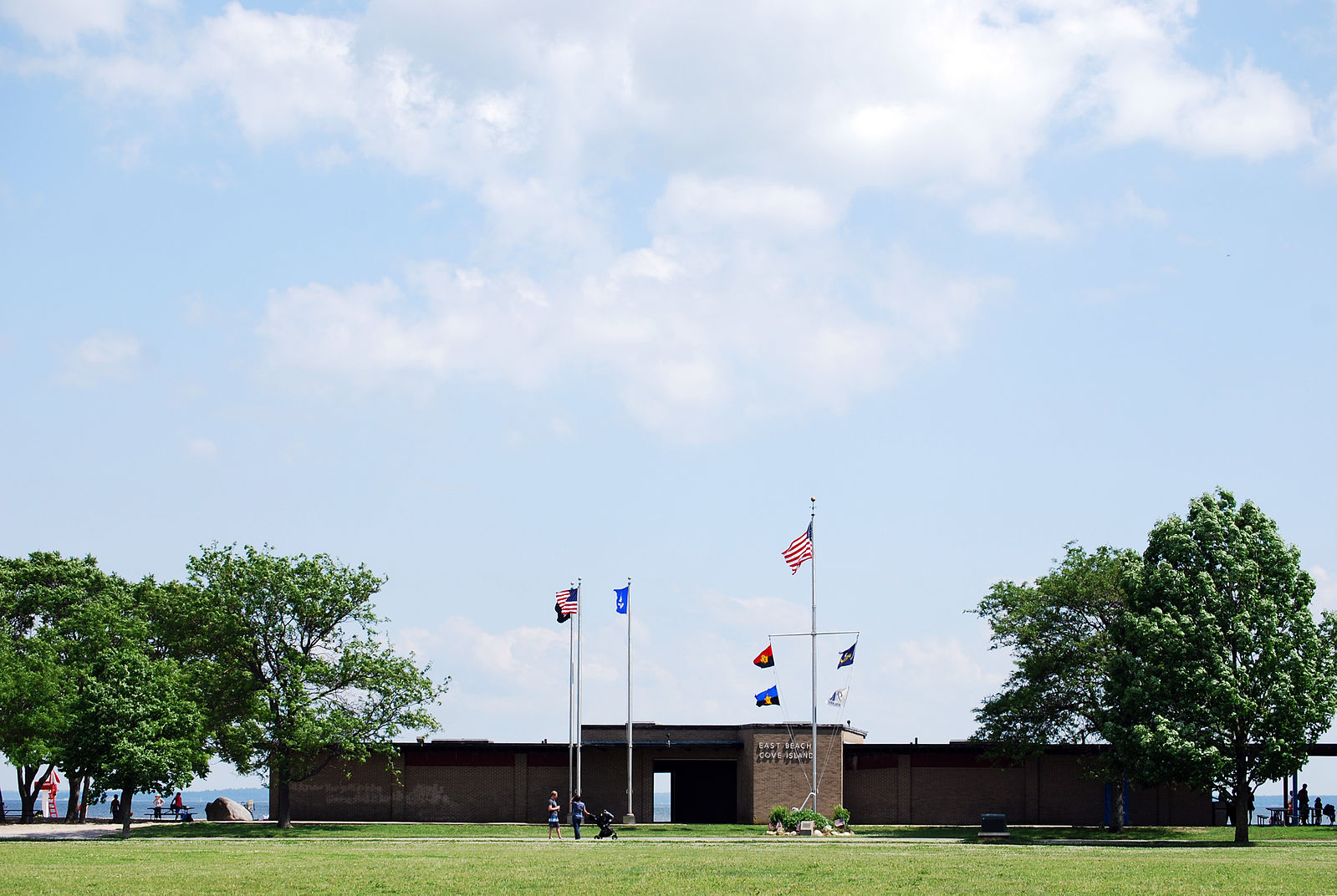
- East Beach facility in Cove Island Park
- Interactive map of Cove Island Park
- Type: Park, beach
- Location: Stamford, Connecticut
- Coordinates: 41.0470°N 73.5013°W
- Area: 83 acres (34 ha)
- Operator: City of Stamford
- Website: Cove Island Park

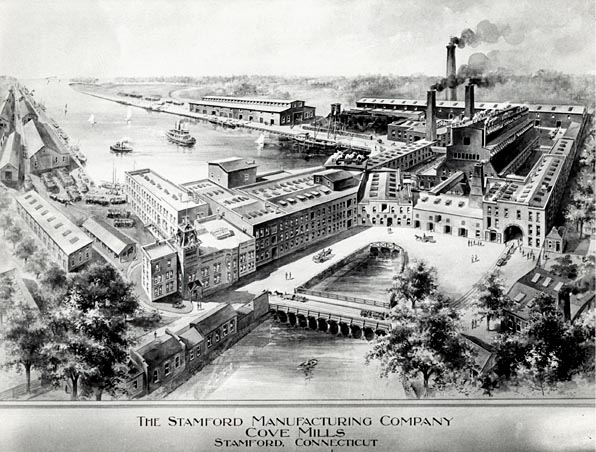
Cove Mills factory of the Stamford Manufacturing Company. The factory burned down on February 19, 1919, in a spectacular fire on the site of Cove Island Park.

Cove Island Park is an 83-acre park, beach and recreation area in the Cove section of Stamford, Connecticut, located on Long Island Sound.

Access to the park requires a parking pass. The city's Park Commission charges Stamford residents with valid Stamford car registrations can buy a season pass for $25 at Government Center, the non-resident fee is $225.

== Facilities for recreation ==
- The park features the following amenities:
  - Beaches
  - One-mile walk/run trail
  - Playground
  - Roller blade/cycling path
- Near the park's entrance is the Terry Conners Ice Rink, where children may skate in the winter, take skating lessons, or reserve the rink for special occasions.

== Geography ==
The area known as the Cove consists of the peninsula bordered by on the west by the Shippan neighborhood of Stamford and on the east by Holly Pond, which, along with the Noroton River, divides Stamford from Darien, Connecticut. Cove Island is detached from shore on the East end of the Cove. It is linked to the mainland by two bridges, one of which is accessible by motor vehicles. The park's parking lot is located on the Cove peninsula, across from Cove Island, and the western part of the park surrounds the parking lot.

The park contains a diversity of habitats: roughly 30% estuary, 20% pond/lake, 10% deciduous forest, 10% shrub, 10% grassland, 10% salt marsh, 5% field, and 5% non-tidal freshwater marsh.

=== Points of interest ===
Stamford's September 11th Memorial is located within the park.

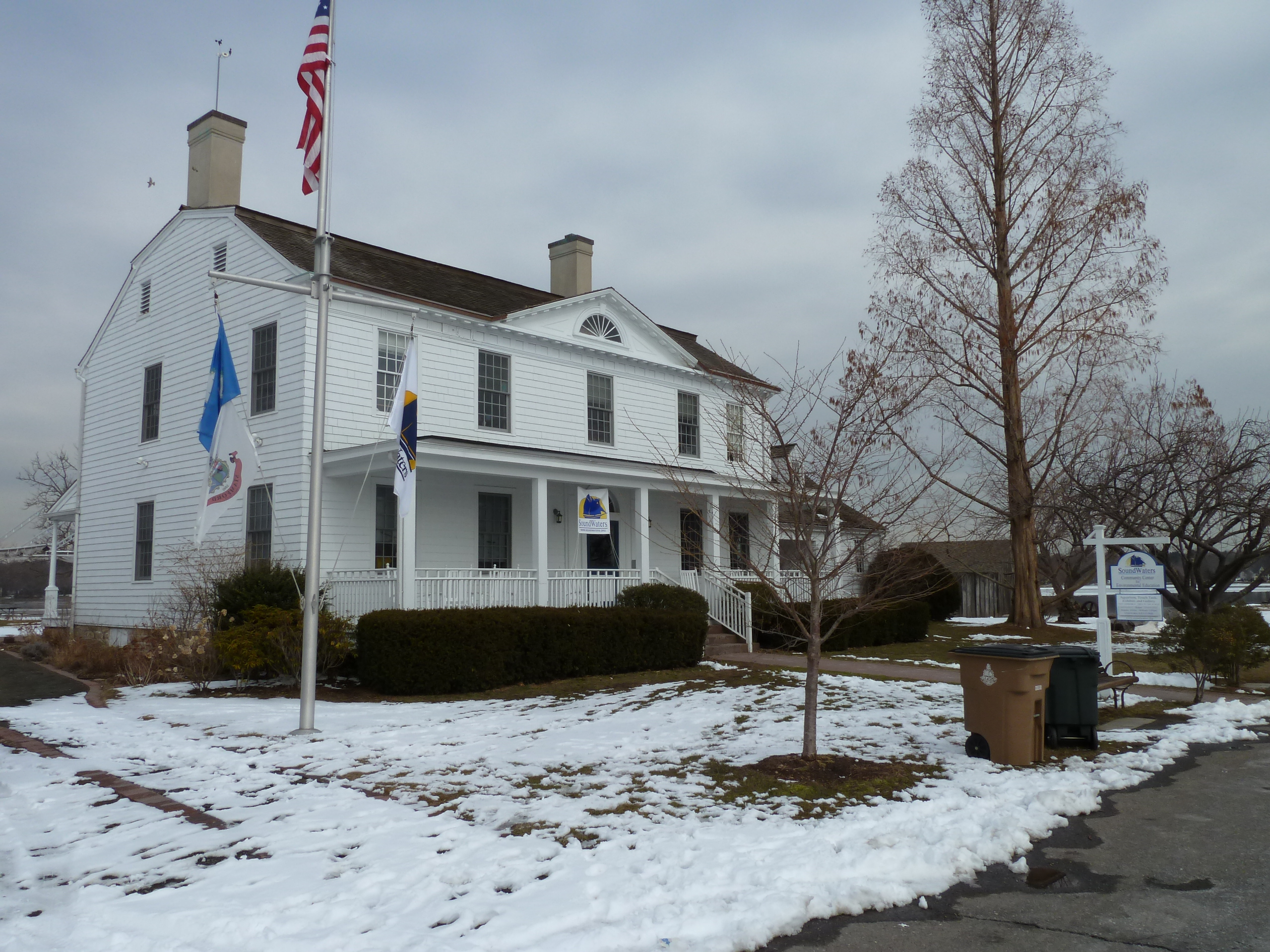
SoundWaters Coastal Education Center

Since 2000 the park has been the headquarters of SoundWaters, a nonprofit environmental education organization that offers a free small aquarium, music, canoe trips, school trips, and family activities on land and aboard an 80-foot (24 m) schooner.

=== Wildlife sanctuary ===
The Audubon Society considers the park to be an Important Bird Area (IBA), one of 27 in the state. The park is known to contain a wide diversity of wildlife, including over 50 species of butterfly and 287 species of birds.

Inside the sanctuary entrance, visitors find an information kiosk featuring brochures, seasonal photos of flora and fauna, and a chalkboard to share new bird sightings. Beyond the kiosk is a 5-acre (20,000 m^{2}) native grass and wildflower meadow encircled by a handicap-accessible visitors' path that leads to a beach-side viewing area from which visitors can observe shorebirds without encroaching upon Stamford's last undeveloped sand dune. The meadow path connects to a rugged trail which winds through woods along the west border of the park.

== History ==
Cove Island became separated from the mainland after a flour watermill was expanded by its owners in the late 1700s. Ownership of the land transferred to Henry J. Sanford in the late 1830s, who founded Stamford Manufacturing Co. in 1844, which operated the Cove's mills and manufactured dye extracts, bleached minerals, licorice. The factory on Cove Island stayed in business until 1919, when it burned down, with the Stamford Advocate calling it the most damaging fire in city history.

Over time, the island was converted to a park by the City of Stamford, with the United States Army Corps of Engineers developing the island's beach in the late 1950s.

The park was flooded during Hurricane Sandy in 2012, with Stamford's parks and beaches suffering $2.5 million in total damages from the storm. The City of Stamford and conservation groups have worked with national experts on a comprehensive long-term plan for the park in light of environmental risks.

In 2015 the jogging trail was the scene of a sexual assault. The incident led to the installation of an emergency phone and security cameras at the park.

In July 2018, mosquitos at the park tested positive for West Nile virus.

== Trivia ==
The movie Reservation Road was filmed at the park, including the opening scene of an outdoor concert and a climactic scene near the end. Weed Avenue, just north of the park, was used in two scenes where a character jogs.
