= Benjamin Hait House =

Historic house in Connecticut, United States

- U.S. National Register of Historic Places
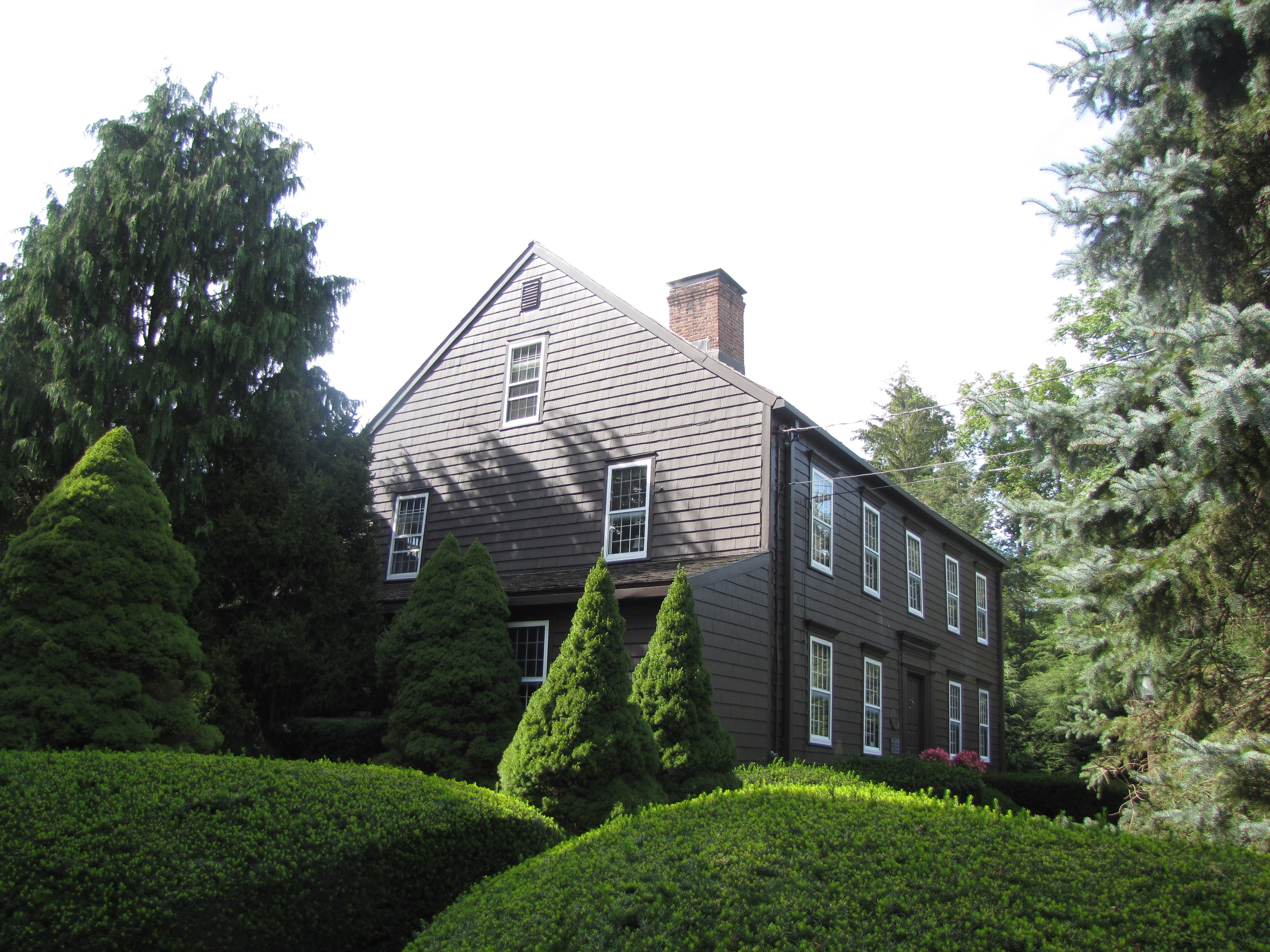

- Location within Connecticut Location within the United States
- Location: 92 Hoyclo Road, Stamford, Connecticut
- Coordinates: 41°8′54″N 73°33′7″W
- Area: 1 acre (0.40 ha)
- Built: c. 1728
- NRHP reference No.: 78002844
- Added to NRHP: November 30, 1978

The Benjamin Hait House, also known as the Hoyt House, is a historic house at 92 Hoyclo Road in Stamford, Connecticut. It is a 2 1/2-story wood-frame structure, five bays wide, with a large central chimney. Built c. 1735, it is the oldest house in the High Ridge section of Stamford, and is a rare example of a New England farmhouse amidst a now-suburban area. The house remained in the hands of the Hoyt family until 1960. It has been restored. It is located on what is now a quiet road, but which once was a segment of high-traffic High Ridge Road between Stamford and outlying areas, and a route to New York State.

The house was listed on the National Register of Historic Places in 1978.

== See also ==
- National Register of Historic Places listings in Stamford, Connecticut
