= David Michel (American politician) =

American politician from Connecticut

Member of the Connecticut House of Representatives from the 146th district
- In office January 9, 2019 – January 8, 2025
- Preceded by: Terry Adams
- Succeeded by: Eilish Collins Main

Personal details
- Born: August 8, 1974 (age 51) Nevers, France
- Party: Democratic
- Occupation: Entrepreneur, activist

David Michel (born August 8, 1974) is an American politician who is a former member of the Connecticut House of Representatives from the 146th district in Fairfield County. Michel Co-Chaired the CT Animal Advocacy Caucus with fellow State Representative Nicole Klarides-Ditria.

== Career ==
=== Politics ===
David Michel has described himself as a "progressive Democrat". In the Connecticut House of Representatives, Michel has proposed bills enabling Connecticut municipalities to allow ranked-choice voting, authorized state funding for a study on excessive rent increases, banning the sale of products containing kangaroos, and establishing an "Office of the Food Access Advocate" to aim to eliminate food deserts in the state.

As of 2018, Michel is a member of the environmentalist non-profit Sea Shepherd.

In January 2020, after being the only State Representative to vote against a bill aimed at accelerating the creation of 5G facilities in Connecticut, Michel hosted and co-sponsored a forum in Stamford designed to alert residents and government officials to the "serious issues" Michel claims 5G presents to "public health, safety, privacy, security, wildlife and property values". There are no scientifically proven adverse health impacts from the exposure to 5G radio frequency radiation with levels below those suggested by the guidelines of regulating bodies, including the International Commission on Non-Ionizing Radiation Protection (ICNIRP).

Michel is running election in the Democratic primary for the 146th District of the Connecticut set for August 2024. Michel lost the Democratic nomination to challenger Eilish Collins Main, in a 5-1 vote. Collins Main argued that Michel has focused his time in the Connecticut House of Representatives on issues that "are not relevant" to members of the 146th District, which includes parts of Downtown, the South End, and Shippan. Michel refuted the claim, touting efforts to give right to counsel for low-income renters facing evictions, and supporting a bill which aimed to reduce food deserts. Unofficial results from the night of the primary showed Michel losing to Collins Main, 44.3% to 55.7%.

==== Electoral history ====
Michel unsuccessfully contended for State Senator for Connecticut's 27th District in 2014 under the Green Party banner. Michel won 1.6% of the vote, compared to Democrat Carlo Leone, who won 54.7% of the vote, and Eva A. Maldonado, who won a combined 43.7% on the Republican Party and Independent Party lines.

Michel won the Democratic Party primary election for the 146th District of the Connecticut House of Representatives on August 14, 2018, against incumbent Terry B. Adams, winning 68.5% of the vote versus Adams' 31.5%.

Michel was elected in the general election for the 146th District on November 6, 2018, winning 72.4% of the vote, versus the 27.6% won by Republican candidate Dan Pannone.

Michel was re-elected to serve the 146th District on November 3, 2020, winning 70.5% of the vote, defeating Republican candidate George Hallenbeck, who won 29.5%.

MIchel was again re-elected for the 146th District in November 2022, winning 63.3% of the vote, defeating Republican candidate Jessica Demmo, who won 33.3%, and Independent Party candidate Thomas Concannon, who won 3.4%.

Unofficial results from the Democratic Primary held on August 13, 2024 showed Michel losing to challenger Eilish Collins Main, 44.3% to 55.7%.

=== Eyewear ===
David Michel also works as a wholesale distributor for designer European eyewear.

== Political positions ==
David Michel has described himself as a "progressive Democrat". Michel has spoken in favor of Black Lives Matter movement, as well as the Independent Drivers Guild, a group of rideshare drivers advocating for better pay. Michel has been critical of increased development in Stamford during the 21st century, and has said it raises concerns about the local environment and displacement of existing residents. Michel has advocated for a public state bank, splitting the Connecticut Department of Energy and Environmental Protection into two different agencies, a $15 minimum wage, and universal pre-K.

Michel has claimed that 5G has "never been tested with independent, peer-reviewed studies", despite the fact that there are no scientifically proven adverse health impacts from the exposure to 5G radio frequency radiation with levels below those suggested by the guidelines of regulating bodies, including the International Commission on Non-Ionizing Radiation Protection (ICNIRP).

== Personal life ==
Michel was born in Nevers, France, and moved to the United States at the age of fourteen. Michel has stated that his mother is an advocate for French retirees living abroad, and was once a regular speaker in the French National Assembly. His father, Jacques Michel (French/American born in Australia), has been a commissioned agent in the Steel industry most of his life after his role as Director of Sales for a French steel manufacturer. As of 2020, Michel is married to his wife Jenny.
