= Harbor Point =

Harbor Point may refer to:

- Harbor Point (skyscraper), a skyscraper in Chicago, Illinois
- Harbor Point, alternate name of Columbia Point (Boston) in the Boston Harbor
- Harbor Point, Baltimore, an expansion south and east of the Inner Harbor East, Baltimore re-development in Maryland
- Harbor Point, California
- Harbor Point, Michigan
- Harbor Point, Stamford, Connecticut
- Harbor Point, Subic, a shopping mall in Olongapo City, Philippines
