= Cuties Island =

Island in Connecticut, United States

- Interactive map of Cuties Island

Geography
- Location: Connecticut, United States
- Coordinates: 41°02′09″N 73°30′37″W

Demographics
- Population: Uninhabited

Cuties Island (also known as Vincent Island) is a small, formerly inhabited island off the coast of Stamford, Fairfield County, Connecticut.

== Background and history ==
In 1945, a lawyer and sailor named Paul Hurlburt Smart (1915–1979) from Darien, Connecticut, purchased the island. He began building a cottage, which was completed in 1950. Fishermen and campers would use the island regardless of not having Smart's permission. Smart spent several months away from the house, and it burned down in 1959. The island was sold to Paul and Diane Daddona in 1965.

The stone base of the house and several stone fireplaces that were inside the house still remain on the island and can be accessed by a clear-watered beach on its north shore. Its south shore is very rocky and slippery, it is very easy to slip and not be able to get up. The island is located between Cove Island and Cummings Park, both of which are in Stamford.
