= Connecticut's 146th House of Representatives district =

American legislative district

Connecticut's 146th State House of Representatives district
Representative
Eilish Collins Main; D

Connecticut's 146th House of Representatives district elects one member of the Connecticut House of Representatives. It encompasses parts of Stamford and has been represented by Democrat Eilish Collins Main since 2025.

== List of representatives ==
List of representatives from Connecticut's 146th district
Representative	Party	Years	District home	Note
Howard A. Newman	Republican	1967–1971	Norwalk	
Richard B. Edwards	Republican	1971–1975	Stamford	
Elmer W. Lowden	Democratic	1975–1979	Stamford	
Jerry Simonelli	Democratic	1979–1981	Stamford	
Moira K. Lyons	Democratic	1981–2005	Stamford	Speaker of the Connecticut House of Representatives from 1999 to 2005
Gerald Fox III	Democratic	2005–2015	Stamford	
Terry B. Adams	Democratic	2015–2019	Stamford	
David Michel	Democratic	2019–2025	Stamford	
Eilish Collins Main	Democratic	2025–	Stamford	

== Recent elections ==
=== 2022 ===
2022 Connecticut State House of Representatives election, 146th District
Party	Candidate	Votes	%
Democratic	David Michel (incumbent)	3,185	61.77
Republican	Jessica Demmo	1,717	33.30
Independent Party	Thomas Concannon	174	3.37
Working Families	David Michel (incumbent)	80	1.55
Total votes		6,624	100.0

=== 2020 ===
2020 Connecticut State House of Representatives election, District 146
Party	Candidate	Votes	%
Democratic	David Michel (incumbent)	8,147	70.49
Republican	George Hallenbeck	3,410	29.51
Total votes		11,557	100.00
Democratic hold			

=== 2018 ===
2018 Connecticut House of Representatives election, District 146
Party	Candidate	Votes	%
Democratic	David Michel	5,913	72.4
Republican	Dan Pannone	2,257	27.6
Total votes		8,170	100.00
Democratic hold			

=== 2016 ===
2016 Connecticut House of Representatives election, District 146
Party	Candidate	Votes	%
Democratic	Terry B. Adams (Incumbent)	6,279	68.64
Republican	Arkadiusz Jakubowski	2,869	31.46
Total votes		9,184	100.00
Democratic hold			

=== 2014 ===
2014 Connecticut House of Representatives election, District 146
Party	Candidate	Votes	%
Democratic	Terry B. Adams	2,447	54.4
Republican	Kieran M. Ryan	1,888	42.0
Independent Party	Kieran M. Ryan	161	3.6
Total votes		4,496	100.00
Democratic hold			

=== 2012 ===
2012 Connecticut House of Representatives election, District 146
Party	Candidate	Votes	%
Democratic	Gerald Fox III (Incumbent)	5,058	70.1
Republican	Eva A. Maldonado	2,158	29.9
Total votes		7,216	100.00
Democratic hold			
