= West Side of Stamford =

Coordinates: 41°03′53″N 73°31′34″W

The West Side of Stamford is the area immediately west of Downtown Stamford, covering the area North of Interstate 95 between the Greenwich Town line and the Rippowam River. The Northern boundary is commonly taken as West Broad Street and Palmers Hill Road. Another version of the boundaries of the West Side has it located between Stillwater Avenue, Broad Street, West Main Street and West Avenue up to Exit 6 Interstate 95.

The West Side of Stamford, Connecticut, also known as Richmond Hill, is one of the oldest neighborhoods in the state of Connecticut. It is located north of the South End neighborhood, west of Downtown and east of Greenwich, Connecticut at Old Greenwich.

== Ethnic groups ==
Many Italian-Americans in the neighborhood in the Twentieth century immigrated from Minturno, Italy and communities near it. The Minturnese Social Club, founded in 1939 and only made up of members whose families hailed from Minturno, had 120 members in 2007. A Minturnese tradition, the Festa de la Regna ("Festival of Wheat") celebration of harvest day and honoring the Madonna delle Grazie, is still honored with an annual procession. On July 8, 2007 the procession was held on Stephen Street after a Mass said in Italian at the Sacred Heart Church. The procession included women in traditional black and white dresses, a float with miniature palm trees, a stuffed rooster, sheaves of wheat and an Italian flag, a marching band, a woman in red, white and green traditional dress with a sheaf of wheat and men carrying a yellow throne with a portrait of the Madonna delle Grazie.

== Local institutions ==
Stamford Hospital with a campus of more than 10 acres (40,000 m^{2}), is the largest institution in the neighborhood, the Yerwood Community Center is located in West Stamford, as is Lione Park, and the Westover Elementary School. The public E. Gaynor Brennan Golf Course is to the north

The New Covenant House soup kitchen, established in 1978, is in the neighborhood and is the only soup kitchen set up to help people in Greenwich, Stamford, New Canaan and Darien. Run by Catholic Charities of Fairfield County, the soup kitchen provides daily hot meals and extreme nourishment to the homeless.

Pellicci's Italian restaurant has been located at the same address on Stillwater Avenue since 1947. The family-owned restaurant is known for unpretentious, old-fashioned Italian cooking. Joe DiMaggio, Nancy Sinatra, Tony Bennett and Walter Cronkite have all dined there. The eatery sells more than 1,000 pounds of baked chicken a week.

== Fire Department ==
The Stamford Fire Rescue Department's Fire Station # 3 serves the neighborhood.
