= Eilish Collins Main =

American politician

Member of the Connecticut House of Representatives from the 146th district
- Incumbent
- Assumed office January 8, 2025
- Preceded by: David Michel

Personal details
- Born: Stamford, Connecticut, U.S.
- Party: Democratic Party
- Website: https://www.collinsmain4ct.com/

Eilish Collins Main is an American politician and member of the Connecticut House of Representatives since 2024 from the 146th district, which contains parts of Stamford. She is a first-generation Irish American.
