= Stamford, Connecticut =

City in Connecticut, U.S.

Stamford
- City
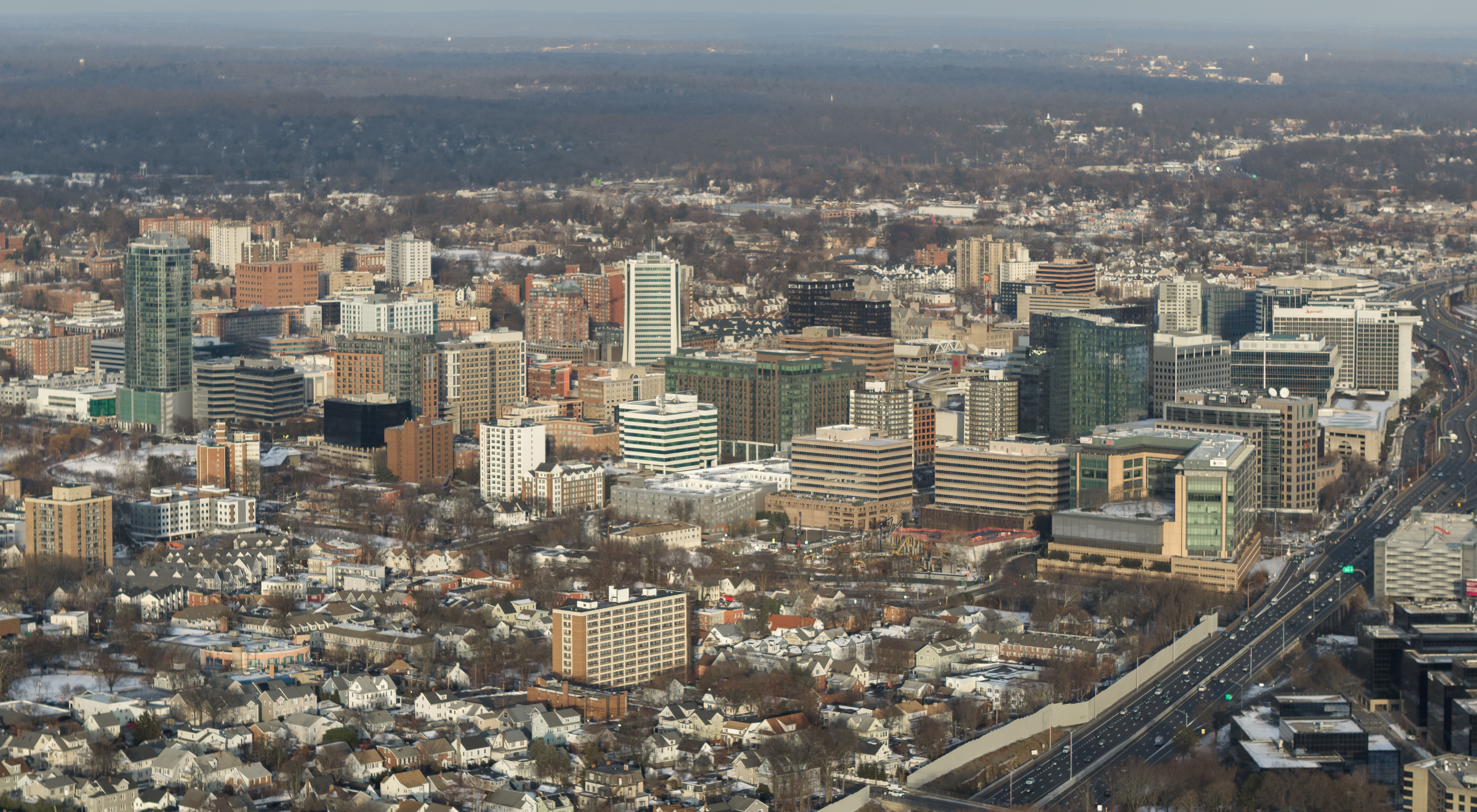
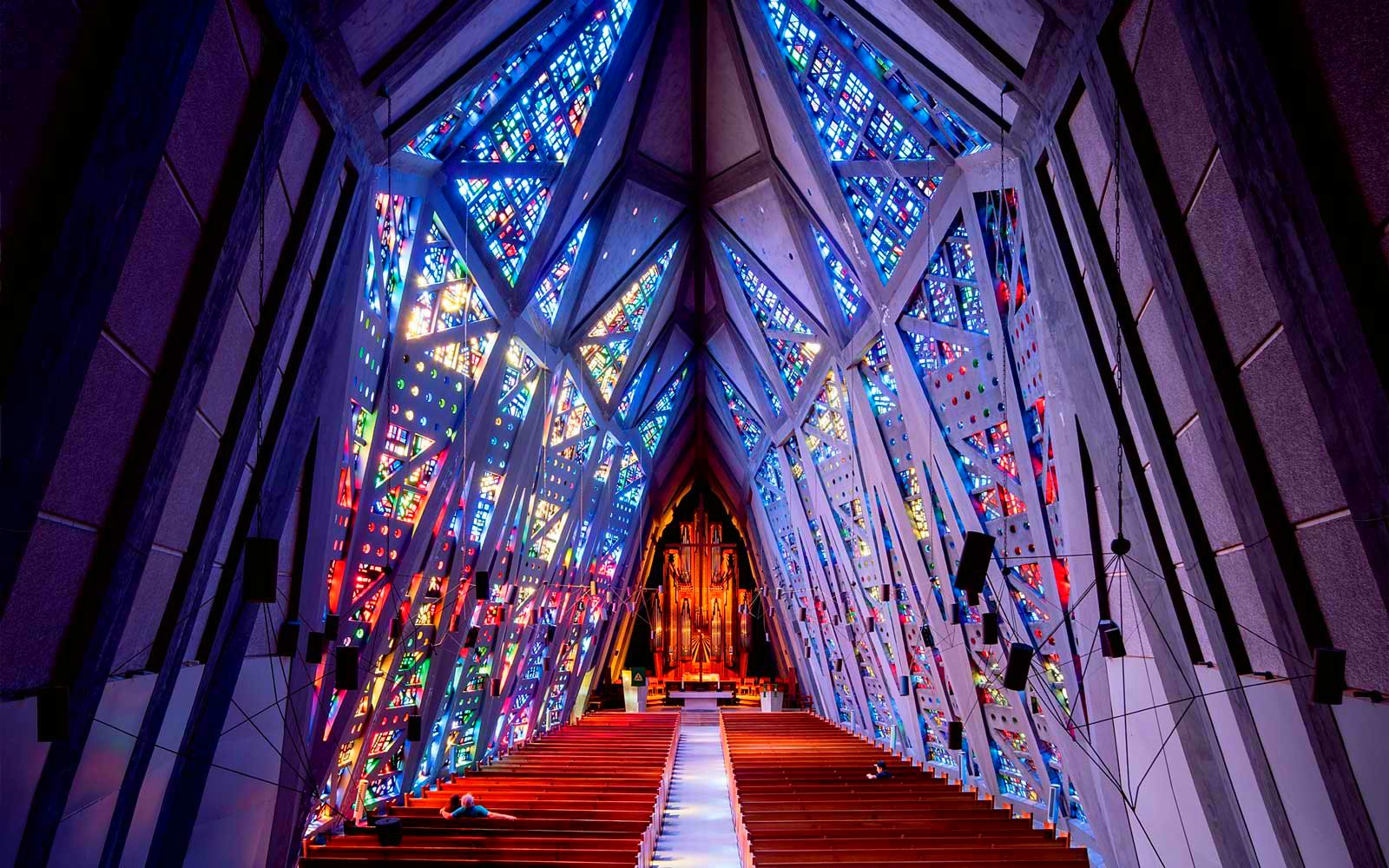
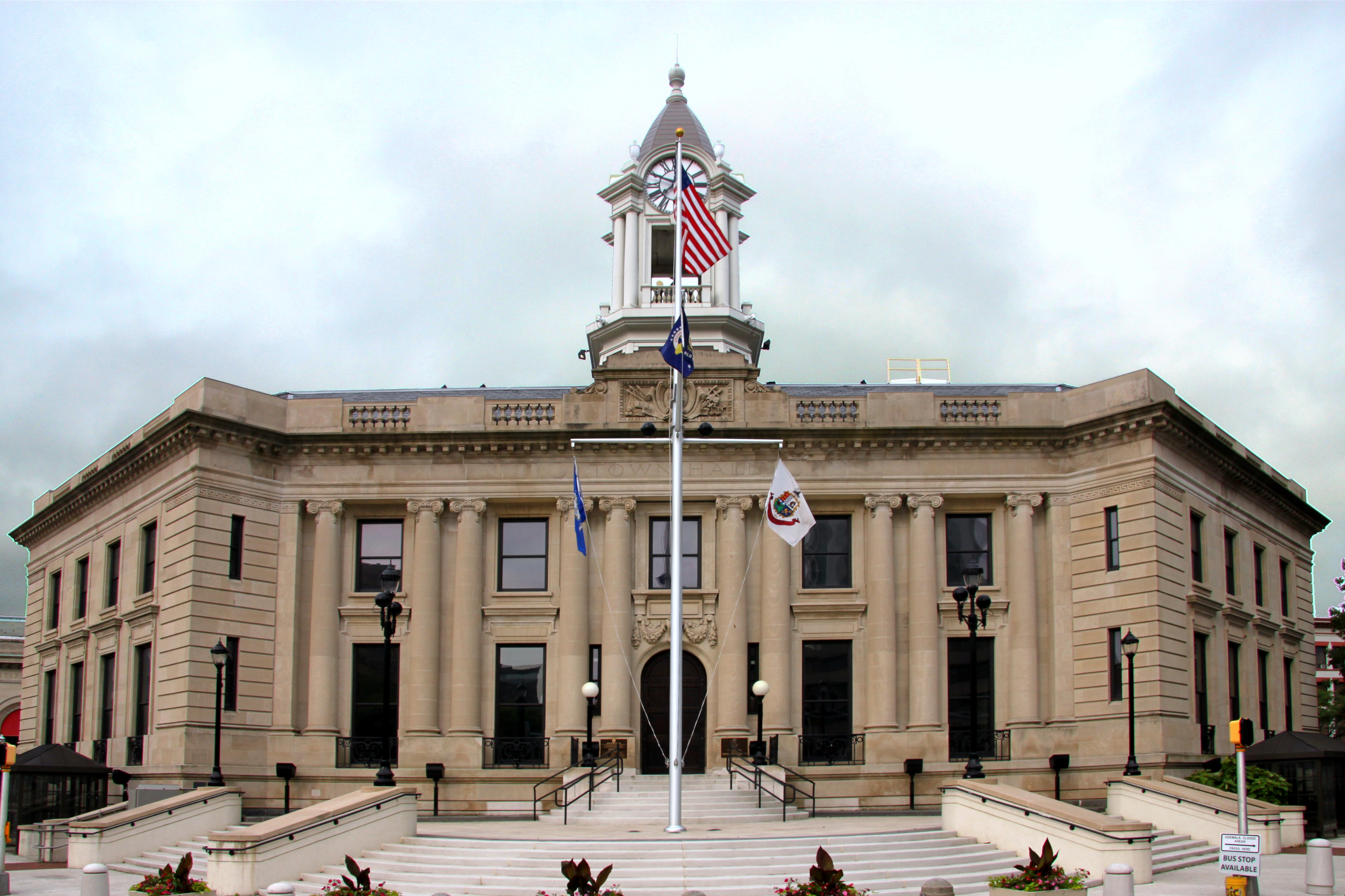
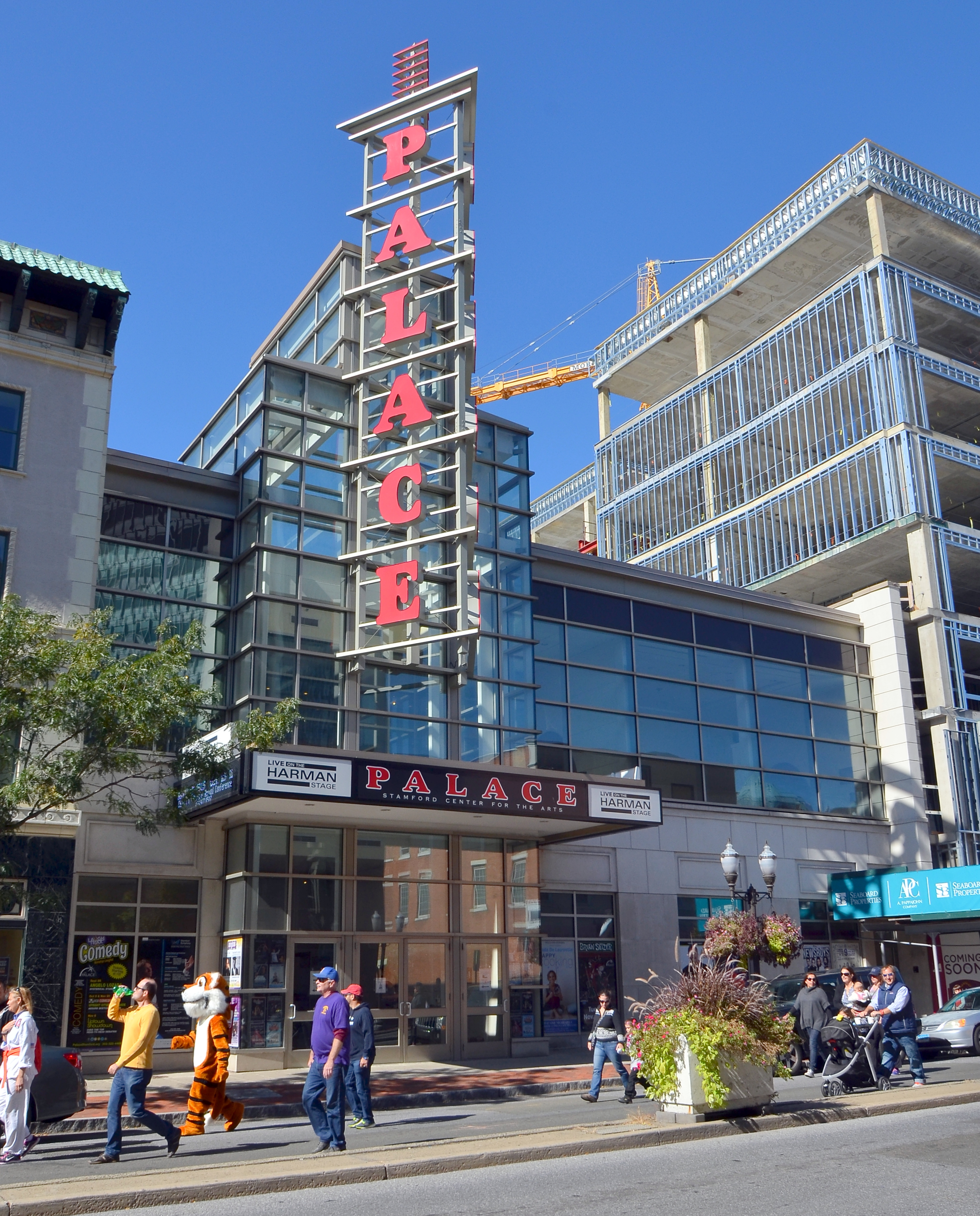
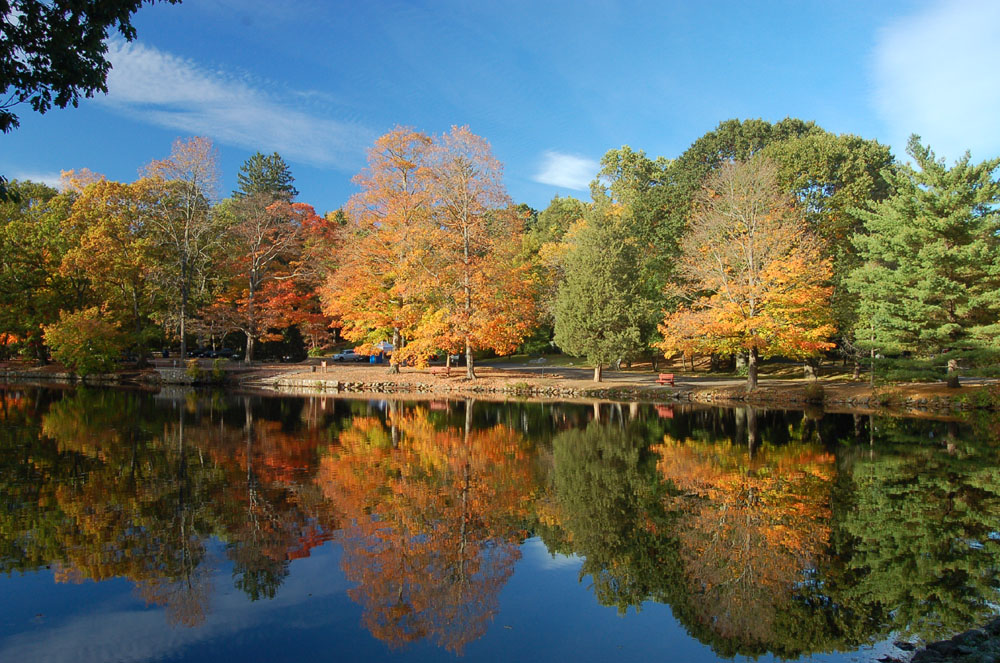
- Downtown Stamford Fish Church Old Town Hall Stamford Center for the Arts Stamford Museum & Nature Center

- Flag Seal
- Nicknames: The City That Works, Lock City
- Motto: Innovating Since 1641
- Interactive map of Stamford
- Coordinates: 41°03′10″N 73°32′20″W
- Country: United States
- U.S. state: Connecticut
- County: Fairfield
- Region: Western CT
- Settled (town): 1641
- Incorporated (city): 1893
- Consolidated: 1949
- Named for: Stamford, Lincolnshire

Government
  - Type: Mayor–Board of Representatives
  - Mayor: Caroline Simmons (D)

Area
  - City: 52.03 sq mi (134.75 km^{2})
  - Land: 37.62 sq mi (97.43 km^{2})
  - Water: 14.41 sq mi (37.33 km^{2})
  - Urban: 465 sq mi (1,205 km^{2})
- Elevation: 23 ft (7 m)

Population (2020)
  - City: 135,470
  - Density: 3,601/sq mi (1,390/km^{2})
- Demonym(s): Stamfordian, Stamfordite
- Time zone: UTC−5 (Eastern)
  - Summer (DST): UTC−4 (Eastern)
- ZIP Codes: 06901, 06905, 06906
- Area codes: 203/475
- FIPS code: 09-73000
- GNIS feature ID: 0211129
- Website: stamfordct.gov

Stamford (/ˈstæmfərd/) is a city in Fairfield County, Connecticut, United States, 34 miles (55 kilometers) outside of New York City. It is the sixth-most populous city in New England. Stamford is also the largest city in the Western Connecticut Planning Region, and Connecticut's second-most populous city, behind Bridgeport. With a population of 135,470, Stamford surpassed Hartford and New Haven in population as of the 2020 census. It is in the Bridgeport–Stamford–Danbury metropolitan statistical area, which is part of the New York City metropolitan area (specifically, the New York–Newark, NY–NJ–CT–PA Combined Statistical Area).

As of 2023, Stamford is home to eight Fortune 500 companies and numerous divisions of large corporations. This gives it the largest financial district in the New York metropolitan region outside New York City and one of the nation's largest concentrations of corporations. Dominant sectors of Stamford's economy include financial services, real estate, tourism, information technology, healthcare, telecommunications, transportation, and retail. Its metropolitan division is home to multiple colleges and universities including UConn Stamford and Norwalk Community College.

== History ==
Stamford was known as Rippowam by the Siwanoy Native American inhabitants of the region, and the very first European settlers in the area also called it that. The present name is after the town of Stamford, Lincolnshire, England. The deed to Stamford was signed on July 1, 1640, between Captain Turner of the New Haven Colony and Chief Ponus. By the 18th century, one of the town's primary industries was merchandising by water, which was possible due to Stamford's proximity to New York.

In 1692, Stamford was home to a less famous witch trial than the well-known Salem witch trials, which also occurred in 1692. The accusations were less fanatical and on a smaller scale, but they also grew to prominence through gossip and hysterics.

New Canaan officially separated from Stamford when it incorporated as a town in 1801, followed by Darien in 1820.

Starting in the late 19th century, New York residents built summer homes on the shoreline, and some moved to Stamford permanently and started commuting to Manhattan by train. Stamford incorporated as a city in 1893.

From late 1945 through April 1946, more than 3,000 workers at the city's Yale & Locke factory, the largest employer in Stamford at the time, went on strike. The strike garnered nationwide attention after the union declared a day of action on January 3, 1946, that drew approximately 10,000 attendees. It resulted in solidarity strikes in surrounding towns and cities, and effectively brought Downtown Stamford to a standstill. Professor George Lipsitz called it "the first general strike in the United States in twelve years".

In 1950, the U.S. Census Bureau reported the city's population as 94.6% white and 5.2% black.

In the 1960s and 1970s, Stamford's commercial real estate boomed as corporations relocated from New York City to the area. A massive urban redevelopment campaign during that time resulted in a downtown with many tall office buildings. The F.D. Rich Company was the city-designated urban renewal developer of the downtown area in an ongoing, contentious project beginning in the 1960s and continuing through the 1970s. The company put up what was the city's tallest structure, One Landmark Square, at 21 floors high, and the GTE building (now One Stamford Forum), along with the Marriott Hotel, the Stamford Town Center and many other downtown office buildings. One Landmark Square has since been dwarfed by the new 34-story Park Tower Stamford condominium tower, and again by the Atlantic Station development, another Rich Company project in partnership with Cappelli Enterprises. Over the years, other developers have joined in building up the downtown, a process that continued through the 1980s and 1990s and into the new century.

Beginning in 2008, work on Harbor Point, a large mixed-used redevelopment project in the city's South End commenced. The initial plan for Harbor Point spanned 80 acres (32 hectares), called for 4,000 total housing units, one million square feet (93,000 m^{2}) of commercial space, and was projected to cost $3.5 billion. In the period following the Great Recession, Stamford experienced a surge in growth, and from 2008 to 2017, the city issued permits for 4,341 housing units. The Harbor Point development has since grown beyond its initial size, and has transformed the demographics of Stamford's South End to become significantly younger, more white, and more affluent.

During the COVID-19 pandemic in the U.S., many wealthy New Yorkers relocated to Stamford and its metropolitan area.

== Geography ==
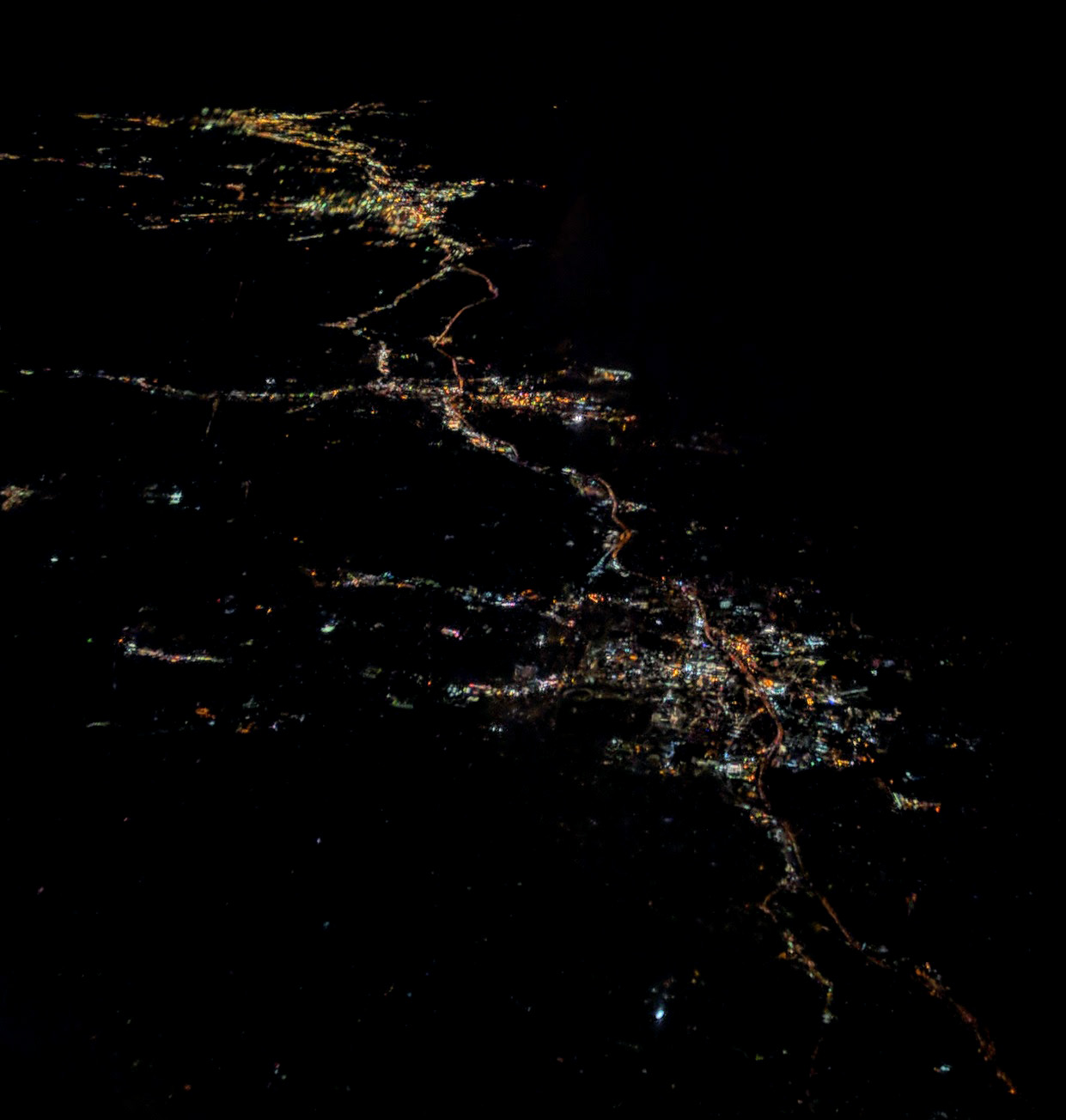
Aerial view of Stamford at night with Norwalk, Fairfield, Bridgeport, and beyond visible and the Long Island Sound completely dark.

According to the U.S. Census Bureau, the city has an area of 52.09 square miles (134.9 km^{2}), of which 37.62 square miles (97.4 km^{2}) is land and 14.41 square miles (37.3 km^{2}) is water. Stamford is the state's largest city by area. The population density was 3,101.9 inhabitants per square mile (1,197.7/km^{2}) in 2010. The city is halfway between Manhattan and New Haven at approximately 38 miles (60 kilometers) from each; it is 79 miles (127 kilometers) from the state capital of Hartford.

Stamford is near the southwestern point of Connecticut, on Long Island Sound. It is part of the Gold Coast. Stamford comprises approximately 45 distinct neighborhoods and villages, and two historic districts, including Cove, East Side, Downtown, North Stamford, Glenbrook, West Side, Turn of River, Waterside, Springdale, Belltown, Ridgeway, Newfield, South End, Westover, Shippan, Roxbury, and Palmers Hill.

North of the Merritt Parkway is considered the North Stamford section of the city, encompassing its largest land mass though it is the least densely populated. North Stamford functionally and legally acts as one municipality with the city of Stamford. Stamford borders Pound Ridge, New York to the north, the Long Island Sound to the south, Greenwich to the west, Darien to the east, and New Canaan to the northeast.

The city has islands in Long Island Sound: Cove Island, Grass Island, Greenway Island, Jack Island, and Cuties Island (also known as Vincent Island). Cove Island is a prominent beach and recreation area.

Stamford is the only city in the United States from which one can cross the border into the same neighboring state (New York) by going due north, due east, due south and due west.

=== Climate ===
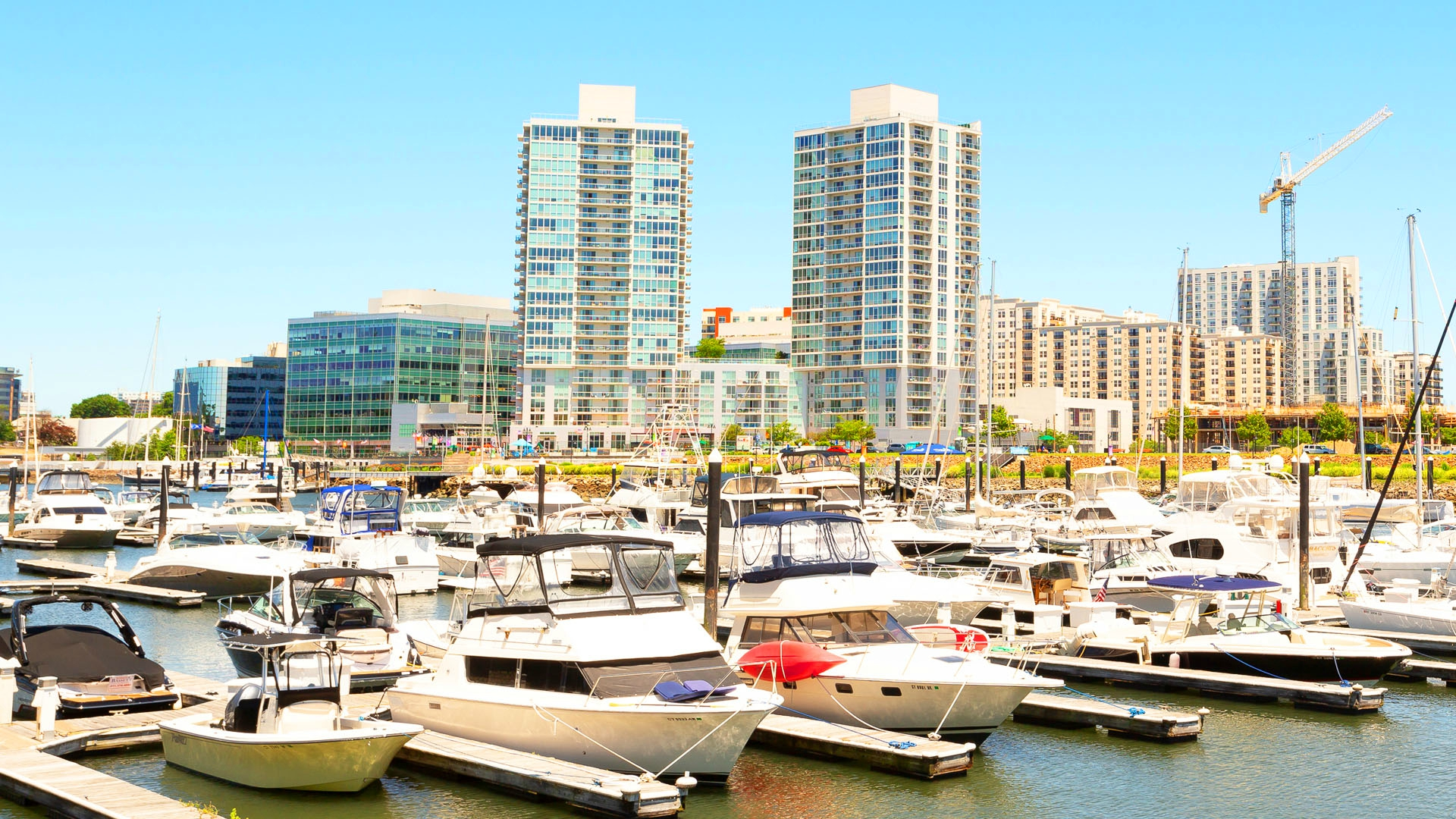
Harbor Point Marina in Stamford in August 2018

Under the Köppen climate classification, Stamford has a temperate climate (Cfa), with long, hot summers (up to 84.8 °F or 29.3 °C), and cool to cold winters (as low as 22.2 °F or -5.4 °C), with precipitation spread fairly evenly throughout the year (ranges from 80 to 132 millimeters or 3.14 to 5.21 inches). Like the rest of coastal Connecticut, it lies in the broad transition zone between the colder continental climates of the northern U.S. and southern Canada to the north, and the warmer temperate and subtropical climates of the middle and south Atlantic states to the south.

The warm/hot season in Stamford is from mid-April through early November. Late day thundershowers are common in the hottest months (June through September), despite the mostly sunny skies. The cool/cold season is from late November though mid-March. Winter weather is far more variable than summer weather along the Connecticut coast, ranging from sunny days with higher temperatures to cold and blustery conditions with occasional snow. As on much of the Connecticut coast and nearby Long Island, some of the winter precipitation is rain or a mix and rain and wet snow. Stamford averages about 30 inches (75 cm) of snow annually, compared to inland areas like Hartford and Albany that average 45–60 inches (110–150 cm).

Although infrequent, tropical cyclones (hurricanes/tropical storms) have struck Connecticut and the Stamford metropolitan area. Hurricane landfalls have occurred along the Connecticut coast in 1903, 1938, 1944, 1954 (Carol), 1960 (Donna), Hurricane Gloria in 1985, and Hurricane Sandy in 2012.

Stamford lies in USDA garden zone 7a. It averages about 90 days annually with freeze. Coastal Connecticut is the broad transition zone where so-called "subtropical indicator" plants and other broadleaf evergreens can be cultivated. As such, Southern Magnolias, Needle Palms, Windmill palm, Loblolly Pines, and Crape Myrtles are grown in private and public gardens. As in much of coastal Connecticut, Long Island, and coastal New Jersey, the growing season is rather long in Stamford, averaging 210 days from April 8 to November 5 according to the National Weather Service in Bridgeport.

Climate data for Stamford, Connecticut (1991–2020 normals, extremes 1955–present)
Month	Jan	Feb	Mar	Apr	May	Jun	Jul	Aug	Sep	Oct	Nov	Dec	Year
Record high °F (°C)	69 (21)	74 (23)	85 (29)	96 (36)	97 (36)	97 (36)	102 (39)	104 (40)	97 (36)	91 (33)	82 (28)	76 (24)	104 (40)
Mean daily maximum °F (°C)	38.0 (3.3)	41.4 (5.2)	49.1 (9.5)	62.0 (16.7)	72.3 (22.4)	79.8 (26.6)	84.8 (29.3)	82.9 (28.3)	75.7 (24.3)	64.4 (18.0)	53.1 (11.7)	42.7 (5.9)	62.2 (16.8)
Daily mean °F (°C)	30.1 (−1.1)	32.2 (0.1)	39.8 (4.3)	51.1 (10.6)	61.1 (16.2)	69.2 (20.7)	74.6 (23.7)	73.0 (22.8)	66.0 (18.9)	54.5 (12.5)	44.1 (6.7)	35.0 (1.7)	52.6 (11.4)
Mean daily minimum °F (°C)	22.2 (−5.4)	23.1 (−4.9)	30.4 (−0.9)	40.3 (4.6)	50.0 (10.0)	58.5 (14.7)	64.4 (18.0)	63.1 (17.3)	56.2 (13.4)	44.6 (7.0)	35.1 (1.7)	27.3 (−2.6)	42.9 (6.1)
Record low °F (°C)	−18 (−28)	−15 (−26)	−6 (−21)	16 (−9)	28 (−2)	35 (2)	43 (6)	37 (3)	28 (−2)	16 (−9)	7 (−14)	−13 (−25)	−18 (−28)
Average precipitation inches (mm)	4.26 (108)	3.14 (80)	4.73 (120)	4.44 (113)	4.12 (105)	4.91 (125)	3.77 (96)	3.81 (97)	5.21 (132)	4.59 (117)	4.19 (106)	4.44 (113)	51.61 (1,311)
Average snowfall inches (cm)	9.1 (23)	11.9 (30)	5.9 (15)	0.5 (1.3)	0.0 (0.0)	0.0 (0.0)	0.0 (0.0)	0.0 (0.0)	0.0 (0.0)	0.0 (0.0)	0.8 (2.0)	5.8 (15)	34.0 (86)
Average precipitation days (≥ 0.01 in)	11.0	8.3	10.1	12.0	12.4	11.6	9.2	8.7	9.1	9.9	10.2	11.4	123.9
Average snowy days (≥ 0.1 in)	4.8	4.0	3.0	0.3	0.0	0.0	0.0	0.0	0.0	0.0	0.4	2.6	15.1
Source 1: NOAA
Source 2: Weather Channel

== Demographics ==
Historical population
Census	Pop.	Note	%±
1880	2,540		—
1890	10,396		309.3%
1900	15,997		53.9%
1910	25,138		57.1%
1920	35,096		39.6%
1930	46,346		32.1%
1940	47,938		3.4%
1950	74,293		55.0%
1960	92,713		24.8%
1970	108,798		17.3%
1980	102,466		−5.8%
1990	108,056		5.5%
2000	117,083		8.4%
2010	122,643		4.7%
2020	135,470		10.5%
2024 (est.)	139,134	▲	2.7%
U.S. Decennial Census; 2020 Census Data

Stamford, Connecticut – Racial and ethnic composition Note: the US Census treats Hispanic/Latino as an ethnic category. This table excludes Latinos from the racial categories and assigns them to a separate category. Hispanics/Latinos may be of any race.
Race / Ethnicity (NH = Non-Hispanic)	Pop 2000	Pop 2010	Pop 2020	% 2000	% 2010	% 2020
White alone (NH)	71,610	65,406	64,876	61.16%	53.33%	47.89%
Black or African American alone (NH)	17,421	16,106	16,201	14.88%	13.13%	11.96%
Native American or Alaska Native alone (NH)	120	124	140	0.10%	0.10%	0.10%
Asian alone (NH)	5,818	9,604	11,453	4.97%	7.83%	8.45%
Pacific Islander alone (NH)	26	43	22	0.02%	0.04%	0.02%
Some Other Race alone (NH)	291	456	1,018	0.25%	0.37%	0.75%
Mixed Race or Multi-Racial (NH)	2,162	1,716	3,802	1.85%	1.40%	2.81%
Hispanic or Latino (any race)	19,635	29,188	37,958	16.77%	23.80%	28.02%
Total	117,083	122,643	135,470	100.00%	100.00%	100.00%

Census data from 2020 showed the city of Stamford with a population of 135,470. This was a 10.5% increase from 2010. Census data also showed Stamford had surpassed New Haven's population, making it the state's second-most populous city, behind Bridgeport.

In 2020, the racial makeup of the city was 49.3% non-Hispanic white, 14.1% Black or African American, 0.3% American Indian or Alaska Native, 8.6% Asian American, 3.2% from two or more races, and 27.2% Hispanic or Latino (of any race). 2020 American Community Survey estimates show that of the Hispanic or Latin American population, Guatemalans form the largest group (6.75% of the city's population), followed by Puerto Ricans (3.77%), Colombians (2.87%), Ecuadorians (2.42%), and Mexicans (2.38%). In 2018, 5.9% of the city was West Indian. The median age was 37.2 in 2018, lower than the national average of 37.9.

There were 54,513 housing units at the 2018 estimates and 50,847 households. The average household size was 2.53 and there were approximately 31,347 families living in the city. The owner-occupied housing rate was 46.6% and the renter-occupied housing rate was 53.4%. Stamford's median household income in 2023 was $106,552. The average household income was $161,829. The per capita income in 2022 was $58,297, the highest of any city in Connecticut. About 9.1% of the population was at or below the poverty line.

In 2010, its population was 122,643. At the U.S. Census Bureau's mid-year 2010 estimates, it grew to 122,902. Roughly 49.8% of the population was non-Hispanic white, 12.9% Black or African American, 0.2% American Indian or Alaska Native, 6.8% Asian, 1.6% from two or more races, and 28.3% Hispanic or Latino. The American Community Survey determined there were 46,396 households. The average household size was 2.56 and the average family size was 3.15. The owner-occupied housing rate was 56.5% and the renter-occupied rate was 43.5%.

The 2000 census determined Stamford had a population of 117,083. The proportion of the population under the age of 18 was 21.6%, age 18 to 24 was 7.8%, age 25 to 44 was 32.5%, age 45 to 64 was 25.0%, and 65 years of age or older was 13.1%. The median age of 37.1 was slightly lower than the U.S. median age of 37.2. Composition of the population based on sex was 50.7 females to 49.3 males.

According to Sperling's BestPlaces, 64.0% of the city's inhabitants are religious or religiously affiliated. The largest religious group in the city are Christians, followed by Judaism, Islam, and eastern religions including Hinduism and Buddhism. The largest Christian denomination in the city is the Roman Catholic Church, served by the Roman Catholic Diocese of Bridgeport. There are four synagogues in Stamford: Temple Sinai (Reform), Temple Beth El (Conservative), Congregation Agudath Sholom (Orthodox), and Young Israel of Stamford (Orthodox).

=== Crime ===
According to FBI statistics in 2014, Stamford is the 16th safest of the 269 cities in the nation and well ahead of any in Connecticut with a population greater than 100,000 that report crime statistics to the FBI. In 2015, Stamford reported three murders, 19 rapes, and 92 robberies. Crime in Stamford is much more controlled in comparison to cities with similar population size in Connecticut and nationally. Lower crime rates in Stamford are attributed to the city's robust economic growth in recent decades. Criminal cases are prosecuted by the State's Attorney's Office, and Stamford is home to a State Superior Court, at 123 Hoyt Street, adjacent to the Stamford Police Headquarters.

== Economy ==
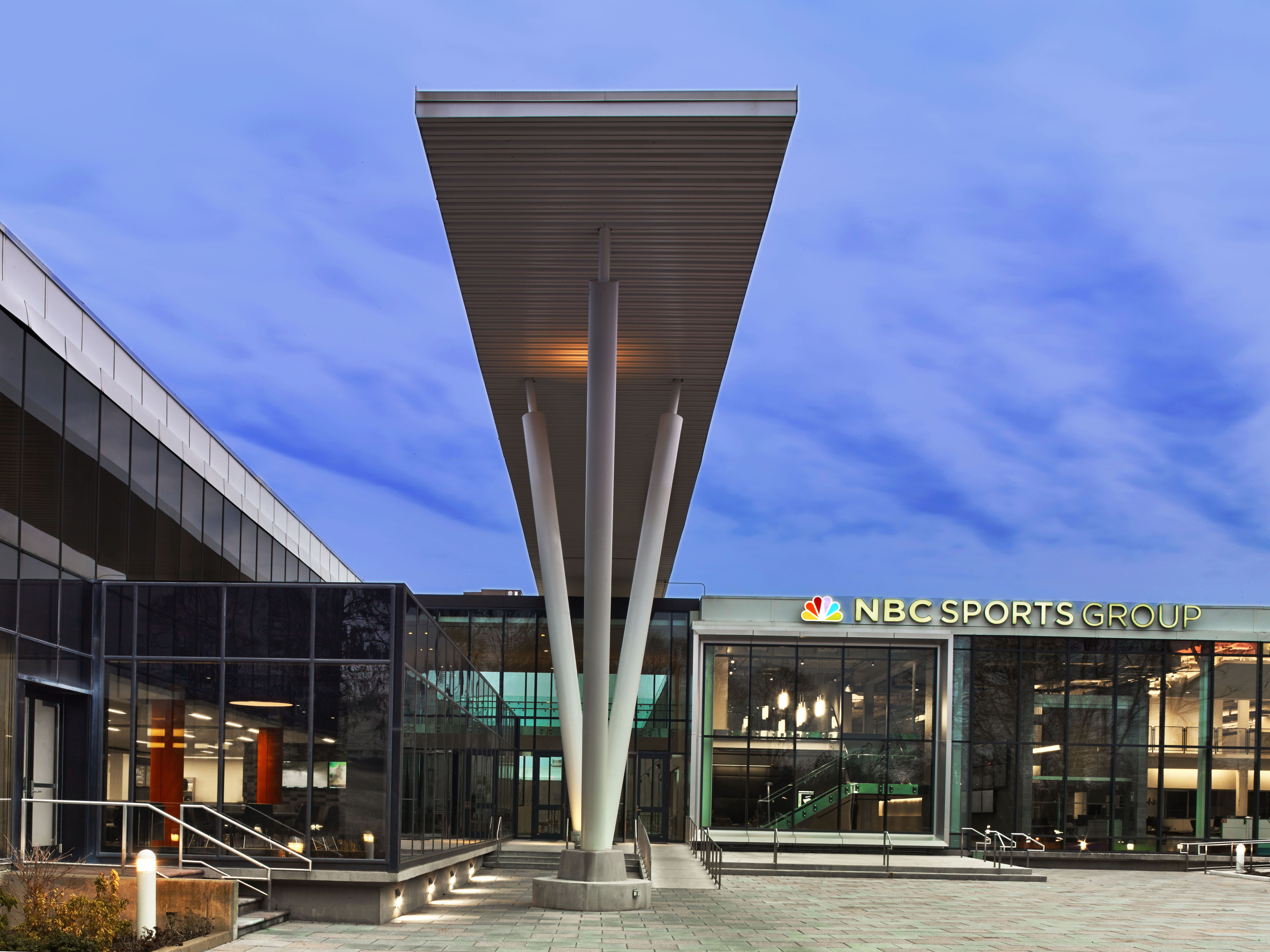
NBC Sports Group world headquarters at 1 Blachley Road

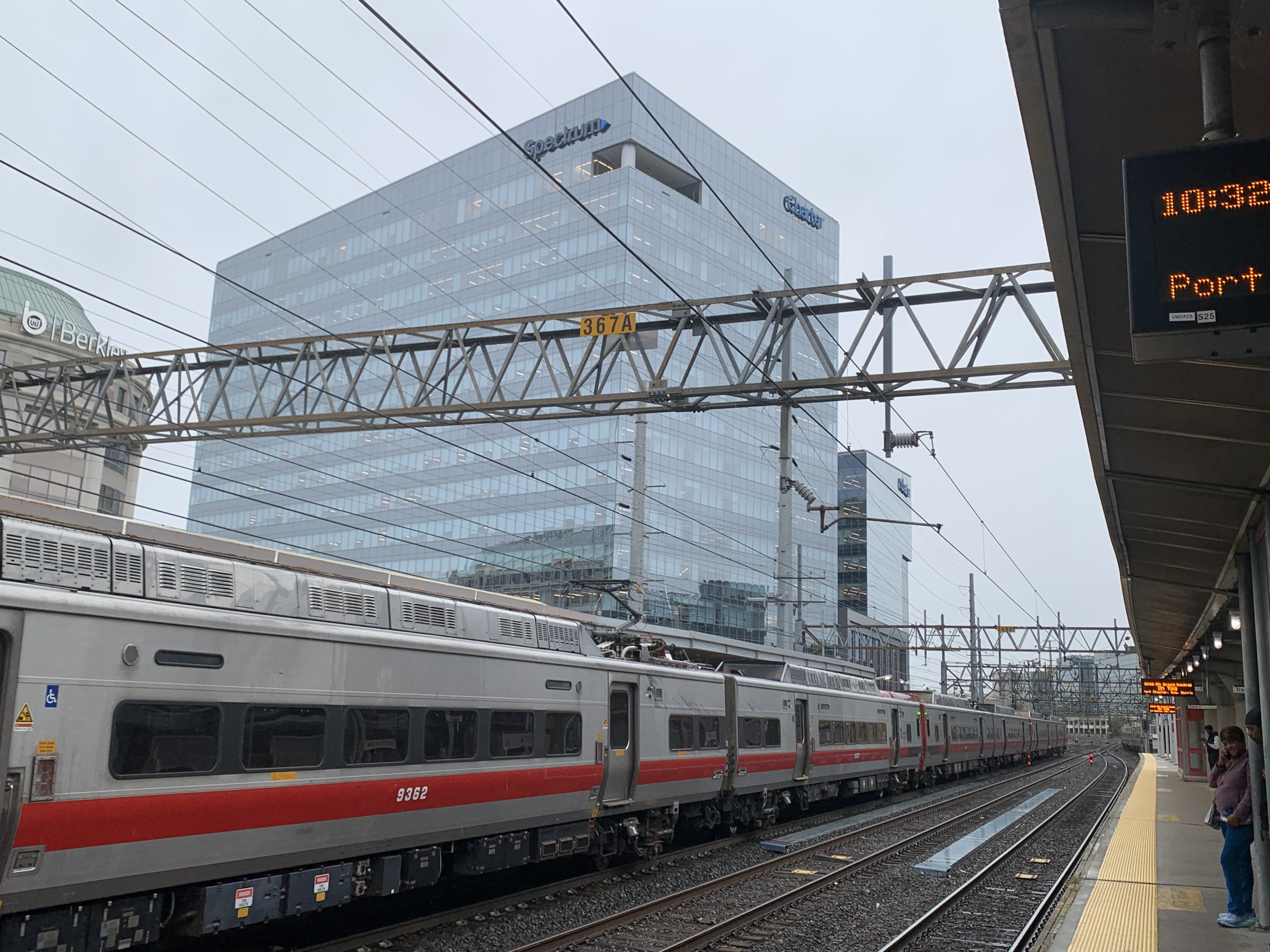
Spectrum's headquarters in Stamford

Stamford's cluster of corporate headquarters includes a number of Fortune 500, Fortune 1000 and Forbes Global 2000 companies. In 2017, Stamford had five Fortune 500, three Fortune 1000, four Forbes Global 2000 and one Fortune Global 500 company.

Among the larger companies with headquarters in Stamford are Charter Communications, Philip Morris International, Harman International, Synchrony Financial, Indeed.com, Webster Bank, United Rentals, Conair, Gartner, Henkel North American Consumer Goods, WWE, Pitney Bowes, ITT Inc., Axa XL, Gen Re, NBC Sports Group, Nestle Waters North America, Crane Co. and Vineyard Vines. UBS' Stamford trading floor held the Guinness World Record as the largest columnless trading floor in the world until surrendering that space in 2017. The building was sold after the bank downsized. The Royal Bank of Scotland moved its North American operations into Stamford in 2009, including its RBS Greenwich Capital subsidiary.

The Harbor Point development, in the South End, is one of the nation's largest private-sector development projects. Many large retail stores, such as Design within Reach (also headquartered in Stamford), have moved in, along with multiple companies including ITV America, McKinsey & Company, Bridgewater Associates and Kayak.com.

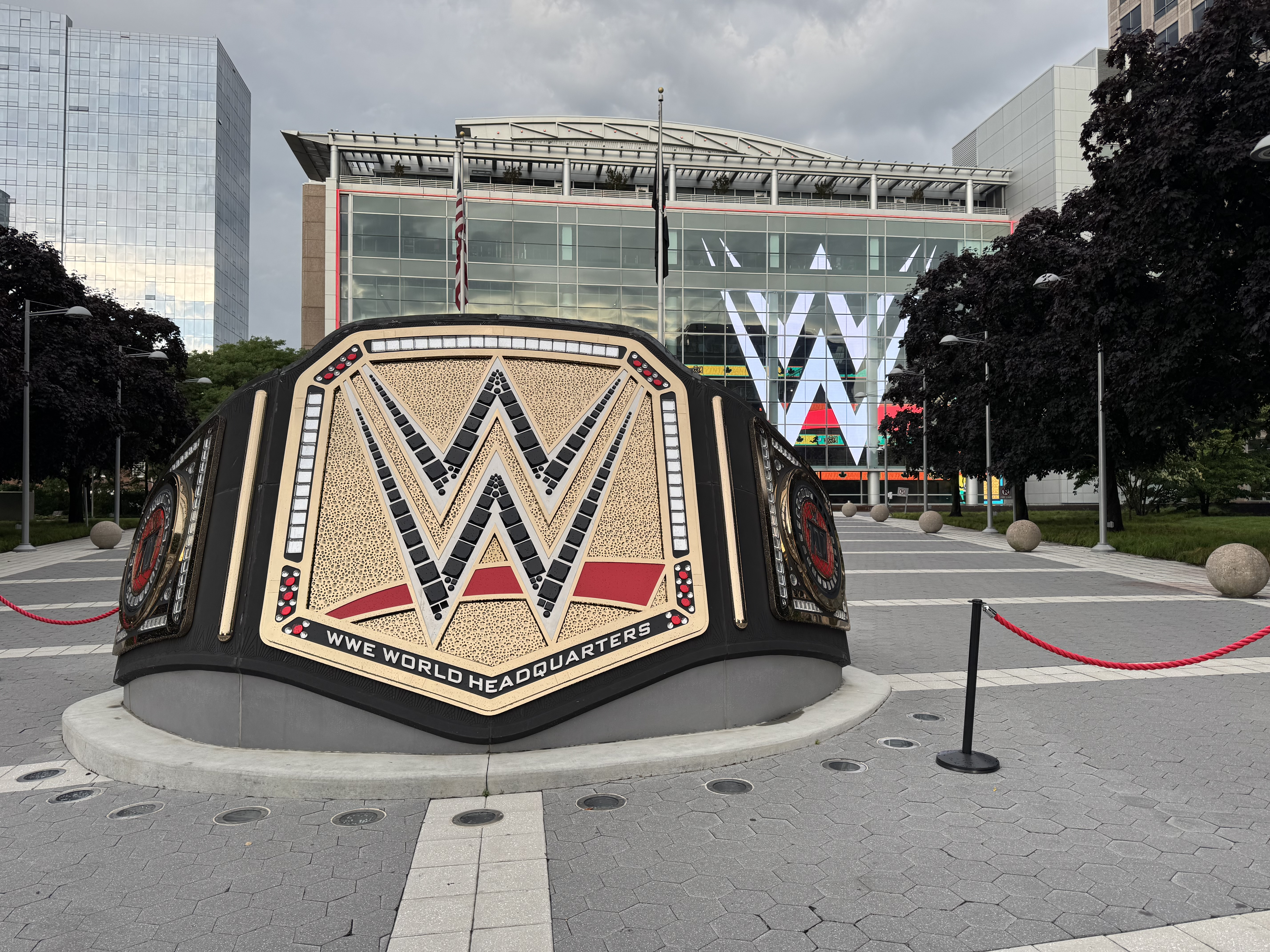
Stamford's giant WWE championship belt sculpture

== Arts and culture ==
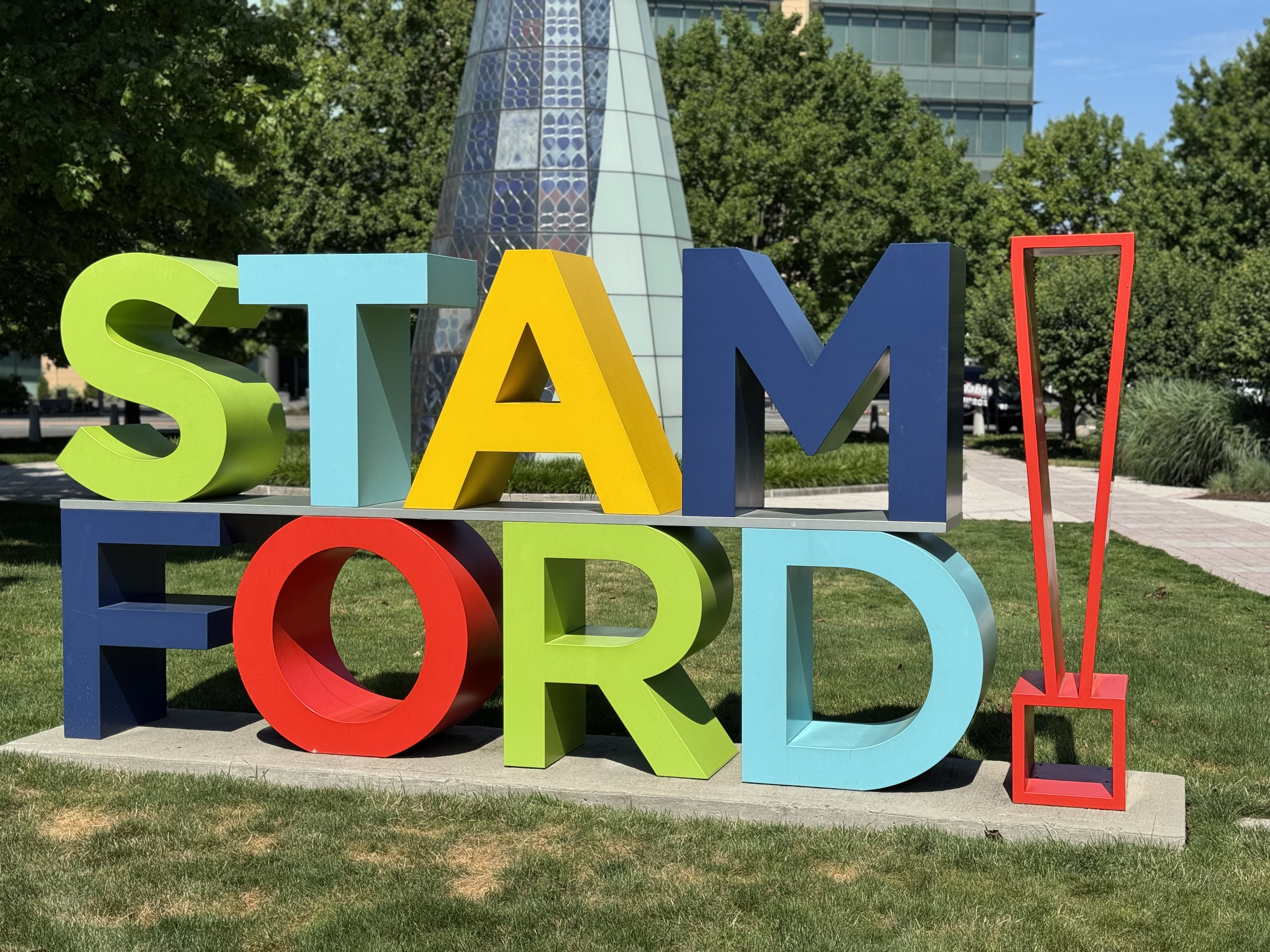
Stamford City Welcome Sign

=== Science and nature ===
- The Stamford Museum and Nature Center on a 118-acre (48-hectare) site in the northern end of town has a collection of works by Gutzon Borglum, the sculptor of Mount Rushmore, who was a Stamford resident for a decade at an estate known as Borgland.
- The Fairfield County Astronomical Society was started in 1954 and runs the Stamford Observatory, which has a 22-inch (560 mm) telescope.
- Bartlett Arboretum and Gardens is a 91-acre (37 ha) botanical gardens and science education center with over 850 specimen trees and plants from around the world. It is also home to several Champion Trees, the largest of their species in Connecticut.
- SoundWaters Community Center for Environmental Education is in Cove Island Park.

=== Theater, film, and video ===
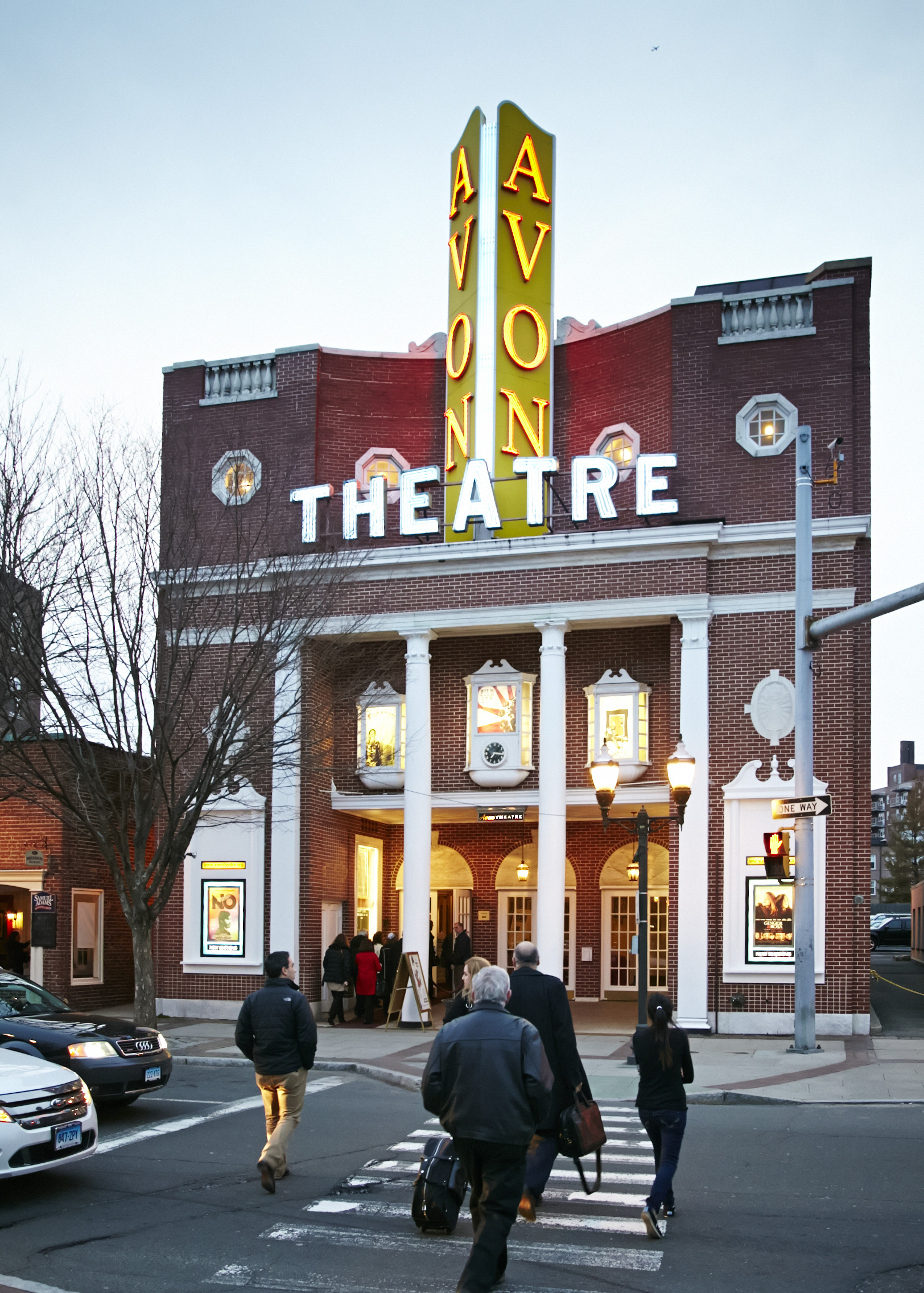
Avon Theatre in 2013

- Curtain Call Inc. presents plays and other entertainment at the Sterling Farms Theatre Complex, 1349 Newfield Avenue.
- Stamford Center for the Arts: The Palace Theatre, originally opened as a vaudeville house in 1927 and reopened as a nonprofit theater in 1983. It was joined in 1992 by the Rich Forum, another downtown venue. Both have been run by the Stamford Center for the Arts.
- Latham Park.
- The Rich Forum is occupied by NBCUniversal as a television studio where various television shows are taped and produced, including Jerry Springer, Maury, The Steve Wilkos Show, The Trisha Goddard Show, and Crazy Talk.
- AMC Theatres has two first-run movie houses in Stamford with a total of 14 movie screens: Landmark 8 and Majestic 6. The Avon Theatre Film Center, a two-screen nonprofit movie house focusing on first-run independent movies, is on Bedford Street. The theater is undergoing a fundraising campaign to renovate the building and its facilities. The Ferguson Library also shows movies.

=== Fine art ===
- UCONN Stamford Art Gallery showcases both emerging and established artists.
- Franklin Street Works maintains an art space in the downtown area.
- Fernando Luis Alvarez Gallery is a contemporary art gallery in Connecticut with diverse international exhibitions.
- Stamford Loft Artists Association provides support for visual artists and opportunities to exhibit their work.

=== Libraries ===
Stamford's public library, the Ferguson Library, is one of the largest in Connecticut. The library also shows movies and has a used book store run by Friends of Ferguson Library.

The library has branches in South End, Springdale, and the Turn of River sections of the city, it also has a bookmobile that runs daily to different neighborhoods. The Turn of River branch, officially called the Harry Bennett Branch, is the largest library branch in the state. That branch also has a used book store run by Friends of Ferguson Library.

== Parks and recreation ==
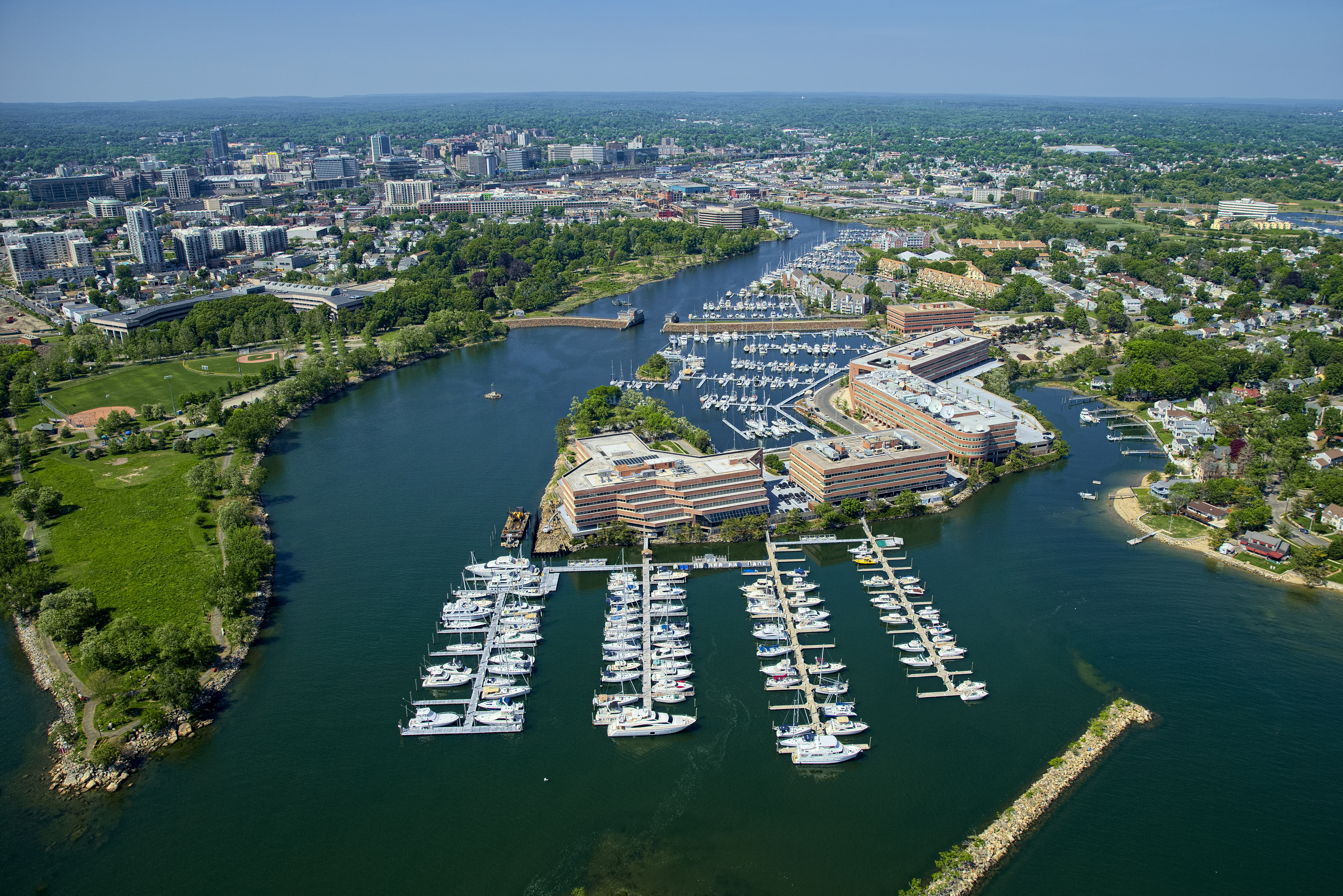
Stamford boasts miles of accessible shoreline for recreation and two public beaches.

- Mill River Park is in the center of downtown. Its ancient grist mill (present when George Washington traveled through Stamford) was modernized in the 1920s. There are numerous community activities offered at the park coordinated by the Mill River Park Collaborative.
- Cummings Park, a public beach, was once a popular spot for shell fishing. The park was developed in 1906 and had been known as Halloween Park because Mayor Homer Cummings cast the deciding vote to create it on Halloween Night.
- The 83-acre (34 ha) Cove Island Park, once a farm and then an enormous factory site (Stamford Manufacturing Company), has beaches, picnic grounds and bluffs. It has a small wildlife sanctuary in the southwest corner that might be interesting for bird watchers. The SoundWaters Community Center for Environmental Education is in the park.
- Jackie Robinson Park on the West Side is named after baseball legend Jackie Robinson, who lived in Stamford.
- Terry Connors Ice Rink shares a parking lot with Cove Island Park. It offers public ice skating, group lessons, and ice hockey. It is the home of the Stamford Youth Hockey Association.
- Scalzi Park on Bridge Street has a playground, baseball and softball fields, volleyball courts, tennis courts, bocce courts, basketball courts, roller hockey courts, and a baseball park, Cubeta Stadium. A concrete skate park was opened at Scalzi in July 2007 for $309,850, designed and built by Grindline Skateparks Inc.
- Stamford has two municipal golf courses. Sterling Farms Golf Course opened in May 1972 and is the more popular. The facility also has a driving range, restaurant, and six tennis courts.
- The E. Gaynor Brennan Golf Course, known locally as Hubbard Heights, opened for play in 1922 as a private course and was purchased by the city in 1949.
- Dorothy Heroy Park is in North Stamford.
- Mianus River Park is 187 acres (76 ha) of nature reserve in Stamford, owned by the city.
- The Italian Center features tennis courts, swimming pools, fitness centers, a playground and a miniature golf course.
- The Stamford Yacht Club is a private organization that provides members with access to boating activities and additional amenities.

== Government ==
=== Municipal government ===
Stamford is governed via the strong-mayor form of the mayor-council system. The city's legislative body is called the Board of Representatives. The forty members of the Board of Representatives are elected from twenty districts, with each district electing two representatives every four years, concurrent with the Mayor's term.

As of 2026, the Board of Representatives consists of forty Democrats.

Democrat Caroline Simmons is Stamford's current mayor.

=== State and federal representation ===
==== Connecticut General Assembly ====
Stamford is represented in the Connecticut General Assembly by three senators and seven representatives.

Connecticut State Senate
District	Name	Assumed office	Party affiliation
26	Ceci Maher	2023	Democratic
27	Patricia Billie Miller	2021	Democratic
36	Ryan Fazio	2021	Republican

Connecticut House of Representatives
District	Name	Assumed office	Party affiliation
125	Tom O'Dea	2013	Republican
144	Hubert Delany	2022	Democratic
145	Corey Paris	2021	Democratic
146	Eilish Collins Main	2025	Democratic
147	Matt Blumenthal	2019	Democratic
148	Jonathan Jacobson	2019	Democratic
149	Tina Courpas	2025	Republican

==== United States Congress ====
Stamford lies within Connecticut's 4th congressional district and has been represented by Democrat Jim Himes in the United States House of Representatives since 2009. It is represented by Democrats Richard Blumenthal and Chris Murphy in the United States Senate.

Stamford city vote by party in presidential elections
Year	Democratic	Republican	Third Parties
2024	62.55% 35,570	35.82% 20,370	1.63% 930
2020	68.08% 40,437	30.71% 18,242	1.21% 720
2016	65.35% 34,148	31.04% 16,222	3.61% 1,888
2012	62.33% 29,623	36.76% 17,473	0.91% 433
2008	64.06% 31,733	35.35% 17,510	0.59% 291
2004	58.60% 27,588	40.07% 18,866	1.33% 624
2000	62.03% 27,430	34.28% 15,159	3.69% 1,634
1996	57.93% 25,005	34.05% 14,696	8.03% 3,464
1992	46.44% 23,185	39.68% 19,809	13.88% 6,932
1988	44.97% 20,773	53.85% 24,877	1.19% 548
1984	39.78% 19,432	59.70% 29,167	0.52% 256
1980	38.35% 17,633	50.56% 23,250	11.09% 5,099
1976	44.55% 20,666	54.80% 25,422	0.65% 302
1972	37.97% 18,299	60.74% 29,268	1.29% 622
1968	45.97% 20,926	48.74% 22,186	5.28% 2,405
1964	64.50% 29,078	35.50% 16,004	0.00% 0
1960	49.86% 21,448	50.14% 21,572	0.00% 0
1956	34.30% 13,977	65.70% 26,767	0.00% 0

=== Politics ===
Stamford is predominantly Democratic. In 2008, Democrat Barack Obama received 64.06% of the city vote to Republican John McCain's 35.35%.

Notable Republicans from the city include former U.S. Representative Chris Shays, former Lieutenant Governor Michael Fedele, and former mayor Michael Pavia. Prominent Democrats from Stamford include current Attorney General William Tong, former two-term Governor Dannel Malloy, former Attorney General and incumbent senior U.S. Senator Richard Blumenthal, former Attorney General George Jepsen, former U.S. Attorney General and former mayor Homer Stille Cummings, Connecticut Supreme Court Justice Andrew J. McDonald, and Chief Justice of the Connecticut Supreme Court Richard A. Robinson. Other notable politicians with Stamford roots include Carrie Clyde Holly, the first woman (along with two colleagues) elected to serve in a State Legislature (Colorado, from Pueblo County in the 1894 election) in U.S. history, Joe Lieberman, former Attorney General of Connecticut and Independent/Democratic U.S. Senator who was Al Gore's vice-presidential nominee in the 2000 presidential election; William F. Buckley Jr., conservative commentator; and French Prime Minister Georges Clemenceau.

Stamford has consistently received a perfect score from the Human Rights Campaign for LGBT-friendly policies since 2016.

Voter registration and party enrollment as of October 27, 2020.
Party	Active voters	Inactive voters	Total voters	Percentage
Democratic	31,177	2,318	33,495	64.87%
Republican	13,638	1,022	14,660	28.39%
Unaffiliated	1,583	155	1,738	3.37%
Minor parties	1,589	152	1,741	3.37%
Total	47,987	3,647	51,634	100%

== Education ==
Stamford has a highly educated population. Per the American Community Survey from 2017 to 2021, 89.1% of adults aged 25 and older graduated from high school, and 52.3% have a Bachelor's degree or higher. This compares to 91.1% and 37.9% nationally, respectively.

Stamford is home to a branch of the University of Connecticut, commonly called UConn Stamford. Sacred Heart University also hosts a physician assistant studies program located on the Stamford Hospital campus. Previously, the city hosted a branch of the University of Bridgeport. UConn Stamford's campus is located in Downtown Stamford, and its main building, reconverted from hosting a former Bloomingdale's store that had closed in 1990, opened in 1998. In 2017, UConn Stamford opened a 300-student dormitory around the corner from the Stamford Campus on Washington Boulevard.

Stamford Public Schools comprises 13 elementary schools, five middle schools and three high schools. As of the 2022–2023 school year, the school district serves 16,212 students, a slight increase over the previous year. Stamford Public Schools students come from a diverse array of backgrounds, mirroring the city's diversity. As of 2022, the majority of Stamford Public Schools students are Hispanic or Latino. 75 different languages are spoken at home by Stamford Public School students, with English, Spanish, Haitian Creole, Bengali, and Polish among the most common languages. Per an April 2023 report by the Connecticut State Department of Education on racial imbalance in public school enrollment, none of the 10 Stamford School District schools studied had a racial imbalance of more than 14% compared to the school district at large. According to the Connecticut State Department of Education, in the 2004–2005 academic year, 42.7% of Stamford's public school students were economically disadvantaged, and 11.6% were students with disabilities.

The supermajority of Stamford Public Schools funding comes from the City of Stamford. In the 2022-2023 fiscal year, Stamford Public Schools had a total operating budget of $301,843,542, provided by the City of Stamford. This represented 82.6% of its total revenue that year, with an additional 9.8% coming from federal grants, 7.5% coming from state grants, and 0.1% coming from other sources.

Stamford's three public high schools are Westhill High School, Stamford High School, and the Academy of Information Technology and Engineering. As of 2022, the Stamford School District's average SAT score was 990, below the state average.

The city also has several private schools, including Villa Maria School, Bi-Cultural Hebrew Academy of Connecticut, King School, Cardinal Kung Academy, and The Long Ridge School.

== Media ==
- NBC Sports Group world headquarters is in Stamford, connected to Chelsea Piers Connecticut. All studios are based in Stamford, including Football Night in America, and all the NBC Olympic coverage.
- Three NBCUniversal syndicated programs relocated to Stamford's Rich Forum in 2009: Maury came to Stamford from New York City, while Jerry Springer and The Steve Wilkos Show were previously based in Chicago. The former two shows ended production in 2022 and 2018 respectively, while The Steve Wilkos Show remains in production as of 2024.
- Television show The People's Court was taped in Stamford from 2012 until the show's cancellation in 2023.
- ITV America announced the opening of a major production office in Stamford with 450 employees, along with a digital media incubator program. Televisions shows produced in Stamford include Hell's Kitchen, Pawn Stars, The Real Housewives of New Jersey, Queer Eye on Netflix, and The Four: Battle for Stardom.
- WWE has had its global headquarters in Stamford since 1985, when it was Titan Sports. Originally located at 1241 East Main Street, the company progressively moved to 677 Washington Boulevard starting early 2021.
- Fortune 100 company Charter Communications' world headquarters has been based in Stamford since 2012. Charter distributes services through its Spectrum brand.
- Stamford serves as a major office for YES Network, The Yankee Entertainment and Sports Network.
- A+E Networks has a major production studio based in Stamford.
- The Soap operas All My Children and One Life to Live were taped in Stamford in 2013.
- This Old House relocated its headquarters to Stamford from Manhattan in 2016, and has about 50 employees in the city.
- Stephen David Entertainment, part of Banijay Entertainment, opened a production office in Stamford in 2019.
- Who Wants to Be a Millionaire started taping in 2014 at the Connecticut Film Center.
- Synapse Group, part of Time Inc. now owned by Dotdash Meredith, is headquartered in Stamford.
- Chief Executive Group is headquartered in Stamford, and publishes Chief Executive Magazine.
- The fictional movie Take My Hand from the episode "I Heart Connecticut" of the NBC show 30 Rock was set and shot in Stamford.
- Stamford served as a location for one of five branches of the fictional Dunder Mifflin paper company on the US television series The Office. The branch was shown during several episodes during the 3rd season of the show, and exterior shots were of the former Starwood headquarters building at 333 Ludlow in Stamford's South End.
- The TBS sitcom Are We There Yet, starring Terry Crews, was shot at the Connecticut Film Center in Stamford.
- In the Civil War event published by Marvel Comics, Stamford was destroyed during a fight between the New Warriors and the supervillain Nitro, in which Nitro detonated himself, killing many citizens of Stamford and indirectly causing the Superhero Civil War.

=== Print media ===
- Stamford Advocate, daily newspaper

=== Radio stations ===
- WEDW-FM 88.5 FM; 2,000 watts, a National Public Radio station
- WSTC-AM 1400 AM; 1,000 watts; shares programming with WNLK-AM 1350
- WEBE 108 107.9 FM 1400; 50,000 watts

== Emergency services ==
=== Stamford Emergency Medical Services ===
A not-for-profit agency, Stamford Emergency Medical Services (SEMS) provides pre-hospital emergency care in Stamford.

In Stamford, medical facilities include the Stamford Hospital.

=== Fire department ===
Fire protection in the city of Stamford is provided by the paid Stamford Fire Department (SFD) and four all-volunteer fire departments—Glenbrook-New Hope, Belltown, Springdale, and Turn of River—plus a combination company (paid and volunteer members), Long Ridge.

Budgeting and districting of the various fire departments throughout the city had been unstable since 2007, due to an extended legal conflict between the volunteer departments and the Malloy administration. As of May 16, 2012, a decision was reached by the city's charter revision committee to combine the paid and volunteer fire departments into one combination fire department, known as the Stamford Fire Department.

=== Police department ===
The Stamford Police Department (SPD) is Stamford's only police force, and has lost four officers in the line of service since 1938. The police force has about 280 sworn police officers making it the fifth largest police force in Connecticut after Hartford, New Haven, Bridgeport, and Waterbury. Most Stamford Officers were trained at the Connecticut Police Training Academy before patrolling in the city. Aside from Police Headquarters, located at 725 Bedford Street, opened in 2019, in Downtown Stamford, SPD also operates substations in Stamford's West Side at Wilson Street and West Main Street, and at 1137 High Ridge Road and Hope Street. The current Chief of Police is Tim Shaw since April 9, 2020, who was a police officer in Stamford before leaving to Easton, Connecticut and coming back to Stamford to become police chief.

== Transportation ==
=== Mass transit ===
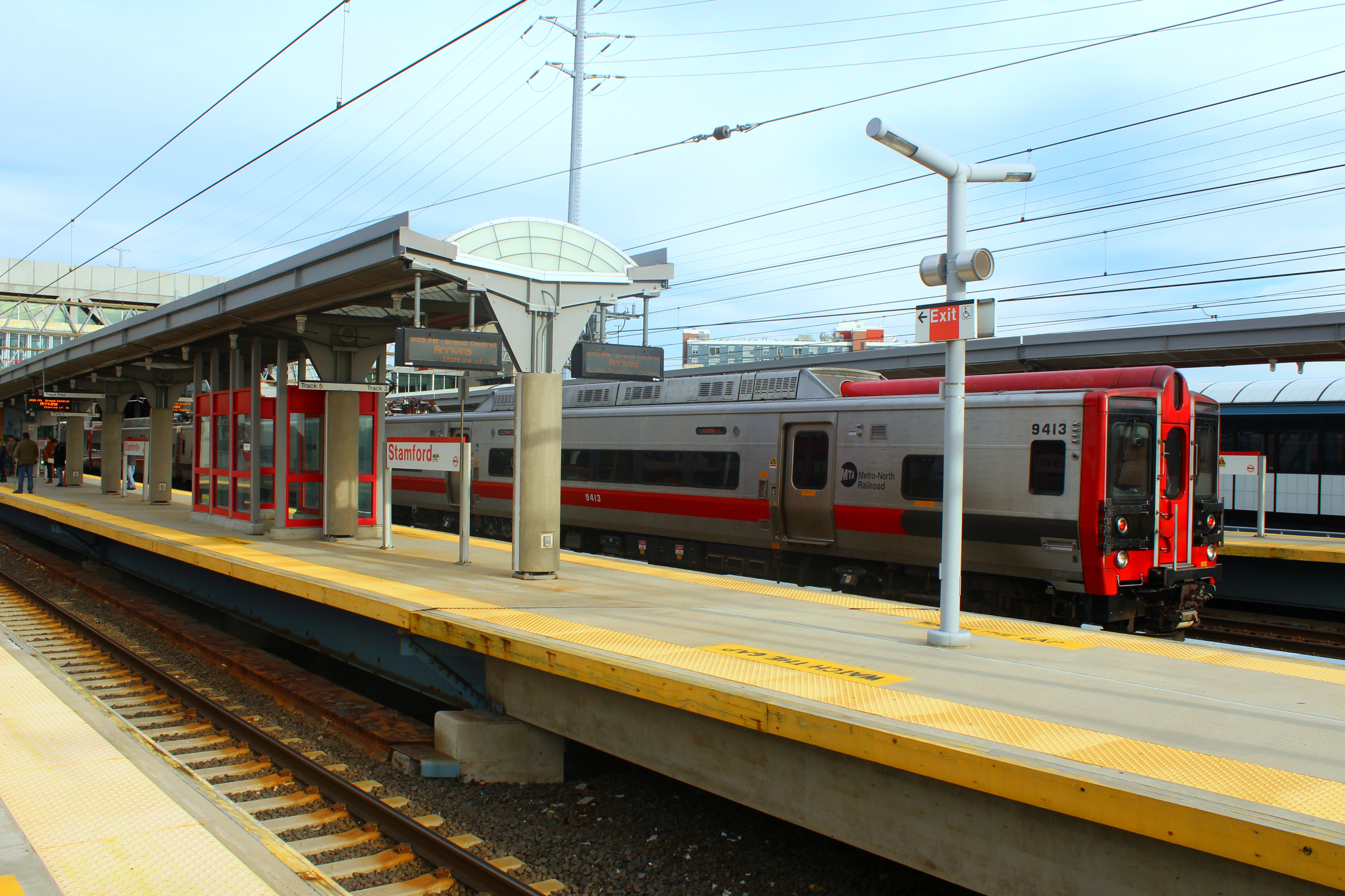
A Manhattan-bound Metro-North Railroad train leaving Stamford Transportation Center

Stamford is on the New Haven Line of the Metro-North Railroad, the commuter rail system for northern metropolitan New York City. Stamford is the second-busiest station on the Metro-North system, after Grand Central Terminal, and serves as a major transfer point for local trains. Stamford Station is also the terminus of a Metro-North branch that ends in New Canaan, 8 mi (13 km) away, known as the New Canaan Branch, and a part-time terminal of Shore Line East and Danbury Branch trains. Two smaller train stations in Stamford are Glenbrook and Springdale, both a part of the New Canaan branch.

Commuter trains come into Stamford from all points between New London to the east and New York (Grand Central Terminal) to the south. The average nonstop commute is 47 minutes. Trains operate from the Stamford station between 4:43 a.m. (first departure to Grand Central) until 12:55 a.m. (last departure to Grand Central).

Stamford also serves as a prominent station along Amtrak's Northeast Corridor. The Acela, a high speed train service between Boston and Washington D.C., makes several daily stops in Stamford. Amtrak's higher-speed Northeast Regional (between Boston or Springfield, Massachusetts and Washington, D.C.) and Vermonter (between Saint Albans, Vermont and Washington, D.C.) also make plentiful daily stops in Stamford. Amtrak has facilities in upper level of the Stamford station.

=== Airports ===
Stamford is within reasonable distance of 11 airports: four general aviation, three regional, four international.

General aviation airports	Distance from Downtown/Location
Danbury Municipal Airport	21 mi (34 km) north in Danbury, Connecticut
Sikorsky Memorial Airport	22 mi (35 km) east in Stratford, Connecticut
Teterboro Airport	31 mi (50 km) southwest in Teterboro, New Jersey
Waterbury–Oxford Airport	36 mi (58 km) northeast in Oxford, Connecticut

Regional airports	Distance from Downtown/Location
Westchester County Airport	8 mi (13 km) west in Westchester County, New York
Tweed New Haven Airport	37 mi (60 km) east in New Haven, Connecticut
Stewart Airport	43 mi (69 km) northwest in New Windsor, New York

International airports	Distance from Downtown/Location
LaGuardia Airport	26 mi (42 km) southwest in Queens, New York
John F. Kennedy International Airport	31 mi (50 km) southwest in Queens, New York
Newark Liberty International Airport	41 mi (66 km) southwest in Newark, New Jersey
Bradley International Airport	75 mi (121 km) northeast in Windsor Locks, Connecticut

=== Buses ===
City bus transportation is provided by CT Transit, which is run and financed by the Connecticut Department of Transportation. The main terminal is adjacent to the train station on State Street, under the I-95 highway. Bus service runs along major arterial roads through the towns of Darien, Norwalk, Greenwich and Port Chester, New York. A non-stop direct route is also offered to White Plains, New York. Commuters can connect in Norwalk to points as far east as Milford and as far north as Danbury. Additional connections can be made in Port Chester and White Plains to all points covered by the Bee-Line bus system in Westchester County.

Greyhound used to provide inter-city bus service from the lower level of the Stamford train station. Bus service was provided to New Haven (Union Station), Boston (South Station), and New York (Port Authority). However, the Greyhound office has been closed for several years, and Stamford is no longer listed on Greyhound's website

=== Highways ===
Two limited-access highways run through the city. I-95 serves as the main route through downtown Stamford with four exits (6–9). The Merritt Parkway runs through the northern part of the city. This road is designated for passenger vehicles only. Any congestion on the Merritt Parkway is mostly likely to occur on the southbound lane in the morning and the northbound in the evening (route to and from New York). At night, due to the absence of lighting, visibility on the Merritt Parkway is relatively poor. Stamford exits on the Merritt Parkway are 8–10, and exit 13 is just over the border in New Canaan.

Stamford is also served by four other state highways. Route 1, also known as Main Street in Stamford, is also used as a major artery during the morning and evening commute. Most traffic via Route 1 is short distance or fairly local, yet vehicles have utilized Route 1 during times of heavy congestion on I-95 as a re-route. Route 137 is the main north–south road of the city and runs from the Stamford Transportation Center and serves the Turn of River, North Stamford, and High Ridge sections of the city. Route 104 (Long Ridge Road) branches off from Route 137 to serve the Long Ridge section. Route 106 serves the Glenbrook neighborhood and continues towards the town of Darien.

== Notable people ==
Noteworthy past and present residents include:

- David Abbruzzese (born 1968), musician, former Pearl Jam drummer
- Alvin Alden (1818–1882), Wisconsin state legislator
- Revington Arthur (1908–1986), painter, educator
- Andrew P. Bakaj (born 1982), former Department of Defense and CIA official, lead counsel for the whisteblower during the inquiry and subsequent impeachment of President Donald Trump, born and raised in Stamford
- William F. Buckley Jr. (1925-2008), conservative author and commentator, lived and died in his home at Wallack’s Point
- Michael Cuscuna (1948–2024), jazz record producer
- Charles Benedict Davenport (1866–1944), biologist and eugenicist
- Albert K. Dawson (1885–1967), photojournalist and film correspondent in World War I. His firm, Brown & Dawson, was based in Stamford from 1912 to 1919.
- Candace Owens (born 1989), political pundit, born and raised in Stamford
- Dana Delany (born 1956), actress, grew up in Stamford
- Willy DeVille (1950–2009), R&B singer and composer, born in Stamford
- Greg Farshtey (born 1965), author and editor at Lego, known for his work on Bionicle, grew up in Stamford
- William Phillips Hall (1864–1932), born in Stamford, transportation executive, lay preacher
- Harry Houdini (1874–1926), escape artist, had a summer home in Stamford
- Nick Howard (born 1993), professional baseball player
- Stephanie Izard, James Beard Foundation Award-winning chef; winner of Top Chef (season 4)
- J. Walter Kennedy (1912–1977), mayor of Stamford, commissioner of the National Basketball Association
- Bernard Jackson (born 1959), singer of R&B music, born in Stamford
- Robert Kravchuk (born 1955), author, scholar, born in Stamford
- Cyndi Lauper (born 1953), singer, had a home in North Stamford
- Joe Lieberman (1942–2024), U.S. Senator and 2000 Democratic nominee for vice president, born and grew up in Stamford
- Christopher Lloyd (born 1938), actor, born in Stamford
- Meat Loaf (Michael Lee Aday; 1947–2022), rock singer and songwriter, lived in Stamford 1979–1981, coached Babe Ruth League and Little League baseball
- Dan Malloy (born 1955), former governor of Connecticut
- Frank J. Marion (1869–1963), pioneer of motion pictures, founder of Kalem Company, who built and lived at Marion Castle
- Vince McMahon (born 1945) and Linda McMahon (born 1948), founders of World Wrestling Entertainment
- Don Morrow (1927–2020), actor, announcer, voiceover artist
- Chris Noth (born 1954), actor, grew up in Stamford
- Gilda Radner (1946–1989), comedian, actress, wife of Gene Wilder, lived in the city
- Lara Raj (born 2005), singer and member of Katseye, born in Stamford
- Rhea Raj (born 2000), singer and songwriter, born in Stamford
- Jackie Robinson (1919–1972), baseball player, made North Stamford his home later in his life; one of the Stamford little leagues is named after him
- Stephen Sondheim (1930–2021), composer, lived in North Stamford as a boy
- Grant Tinker (1926–2016), former husband of Mary Tyler Moore and former chairman and CEO of NBC (1981–1986), was born in the city
- Bobby Valentine (born 1950), former baseball player manager, owner of downtown sports bar "Bobby V's"
- Vivian Vance (1909–1979), actress who starred as Ethel Mertz in I Love Lucy
- Mort Walker (1923–2018), cartoonist for Beetle Bailey and Hi and Lois
- Gene Wilder (1933–2016), actor and director, lived and died in the city

== Sister cities ==
- Afula, Israel
- Jiangdu, Jiangsu, China
- Kramatorsk, Ukraine
- Lima, Peru
- Minturno, Lazio, Italy
- Settefrati, Lazio, Italy
- Sparta, Greece

== See also ==
- History of Stamford, Connecticut
- National Register of Historic Places listings in Stamford, Connecticut
