= South End of Stamford =

- South End Historic District
- U.S. National Register of Historic Places
- U.S. Historic district
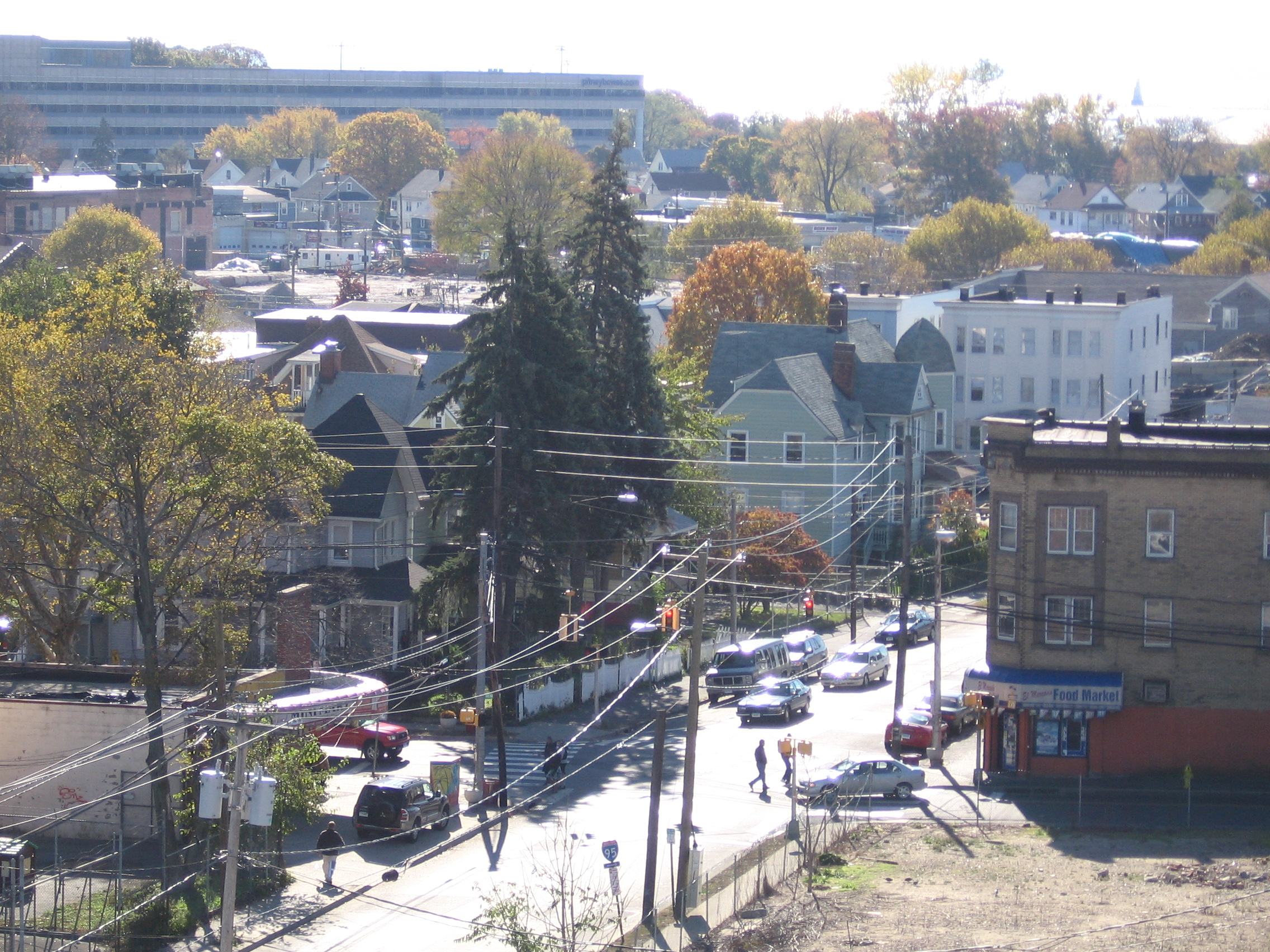
- Atlantic Street in the South End with many elements of the neighborhood: empty lot, modest homes and businesses, Pitney Bowes modern office building and, in upper lefthand corner, the end of the defunct Yale & Towne factory building

- Location within Connecticut Location within the United States
- Location: Roughly bounded by Metro-North Railroad Tracks, Stamford Canal, Woodland Cemetery, and Washington Boulevard Stamford, Connecticut
- Coordinates: 41°2′47″N 73°32′27″W
- Area: 177.1 acres (71.7 ha)
- Built: 1868
- Architect: Multiple
- Architectural style: Colonial Revival, Late Victorian, Mixed (more than 2 styles from different periods)
- NRHP reference No.: 86000472
- Added to NRHP: March 19, 1986

The South End of Stamford, Connecticut is a neighborhood located at the southern end of the city, just south of the Downtown neighborhood. The South End is a peninsula bordered by Downtown Stamford and Interstate 95 to the north and almost totally by water on all other sides (Stamford Canal to the East and the Rippowam River to the West), with few streets linking it to other neighborhoods.

Once a major industrial hub, home to the major lock manufacturing company Yale & Towne, the neighborhood has seen rapid redevelopment since the late 2000s. The 80-acre (32 ha) Harbor Point redevelopment, launched in 2008, saw a number of industrial sites redeveloped and repurposed as high-end residential, office, and commercial buildings. The redevelopment has attracted many young professionals to the South End, drawing remarks from many locals about the dramatic change in the neighborhood, as well as concerns about gentrification, overdevelopment, and affordability.

It contains some industrial tracts, several old factory buildings, many small homes and apartment buildings, and a number of office buildings. Most of the neighborhood has been designated as the South End Historic District which is listed on the National Register of Historic Places. A high-risk flood zone, Stamford's South End is the location of the Stamford Hurricane Protection Barrier, operated by the U.S. Army Corps of Engineers.

The neighborhood spans an area of 0.56 square miles (1.5 km^{2}), and has a population of 6,568 per a 2019 estimate.

== Historic district ==
The South End Historic District covers a 177.1-acre (71.7 ha) area of the South End neighborhood. The district includes 449 buildings, most dating from the 1870s to the 1930s, and also "an early naturalistic cemetery, and an iron bridge."

The Yale & Towne Lock Works was a major manufacturer which, along with other industry in the area, provided employment and shaped the neighborhood. The oldest structure in the district is the Peter DeMill House. Other notable buildings are Number 715 on Atlantic Street, a tenement building, and the Holy Name Rectory. The historic district includes the Pulaski Street Bridge, a wrought-iron lenticular through-truss bridge over the Rippowam River.

== History ==
The South End was one of the first sections of Stamford to be cleared and held in common by the original settlers from 1641 to 1665. By 1699 it and other sections of the town had been apportioned to individual land owners.

"The area of Stamford known for many years as Hoytville was owned by George Hoyt, a real estate agent and the largest property owner in the city in the 1870s," wrote Susan Nova in an article in The Advocate of Stamford. The South End was the manufacturing heart of the city in the nineteenth through mid-twentieth centuries. Most of the South End, previously owned by Greenwich-based Antares, which began a multi-use project on 82 acres (33 ha) "...abruptly handed the project it spearheaded to Building and Land Technology L.L.C. BLT signed on to the $3 billion-plus project earlier [in 2008] as a co-developer, and announced a $200 million recapitalization of the project," according to the Fairfield County Business Journal. "They showed great vision in assembling and entitling such an extraordinary piece of ground," said Carl Kuehner III, chief executive of BLT, in a prepared statement announcing the change. "Harbor Point incorporates the best in innovative urban design, community planning and technologically advanced environmental design."

Linus Yale Jr. introduced some combination safe locks and key-operated cylinder locks around 1862. Then in 1868, he and Henry Robinson Towne founded the Yale Lock Manufacturing Company in the South End to produce cylinder locks. Yale died later that year. The Yale & Towne lock company manufactured locks there (giving Stamford its early nickname, "Lock City"). And other manufacturing businesses were sited there.

In 1938, the neighborhood was severely flooded by a hurricane that swept through southern New England. Since then, barriers have been constructed in Stamford Harbor to prevent similar flooding. About 600 acres of downtown Stamford is now protected by a two-mile-long barrier system built in 1969 by the Army Corps of Engineers, that "helped prevent about $25 million in damage" during the 11 food storm surge of Hurricane Sandy.

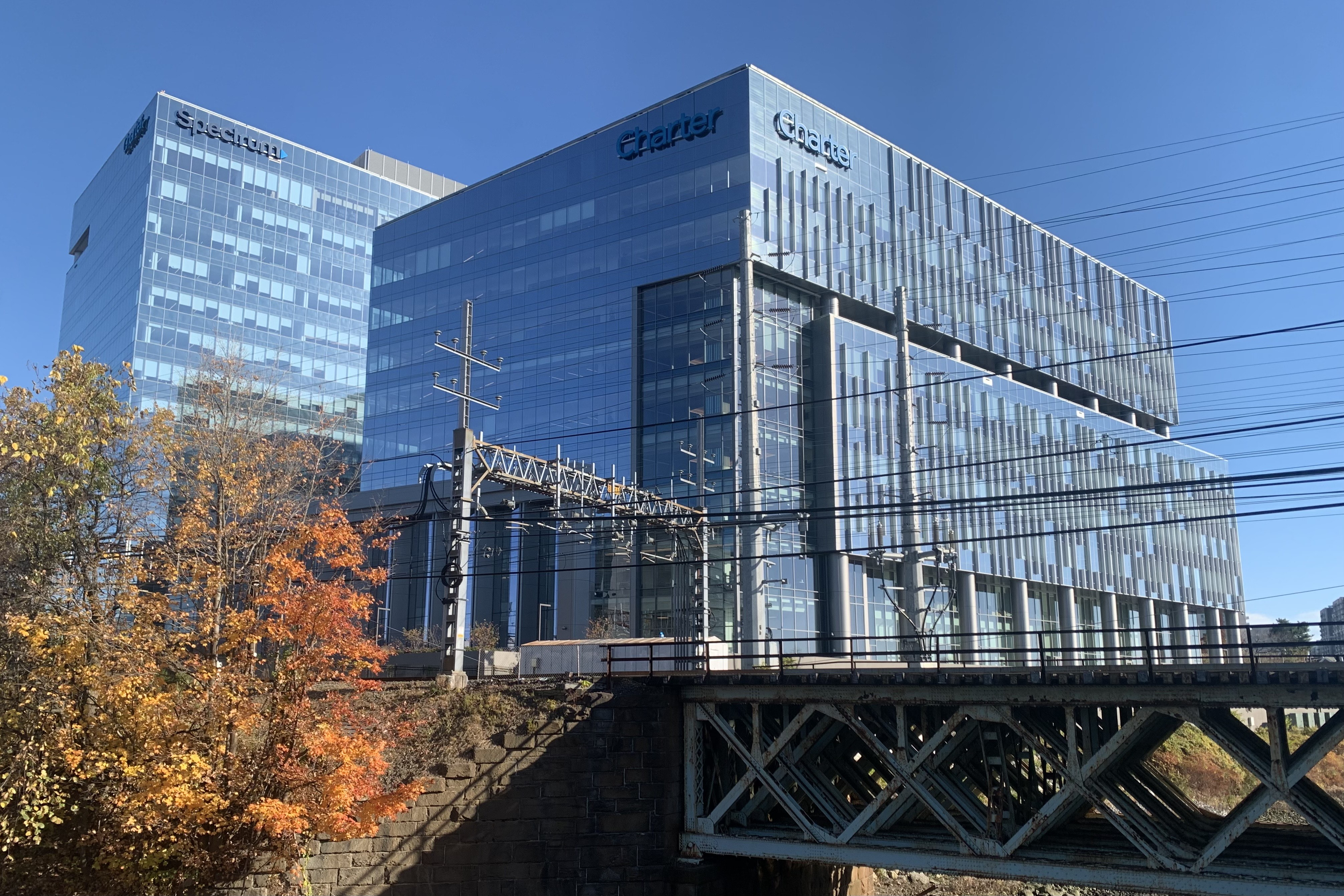
Headquarters of Charter Communications (opened in 2022)

Major corporate headquarters in the area include Charter Communications, Kayak.com, Design With Reach, Centerplate, Thomson Reuters, Daymon Worldwide, High Ridge Brands, and Rhone Apparel.

=== Pitney Bowes ===
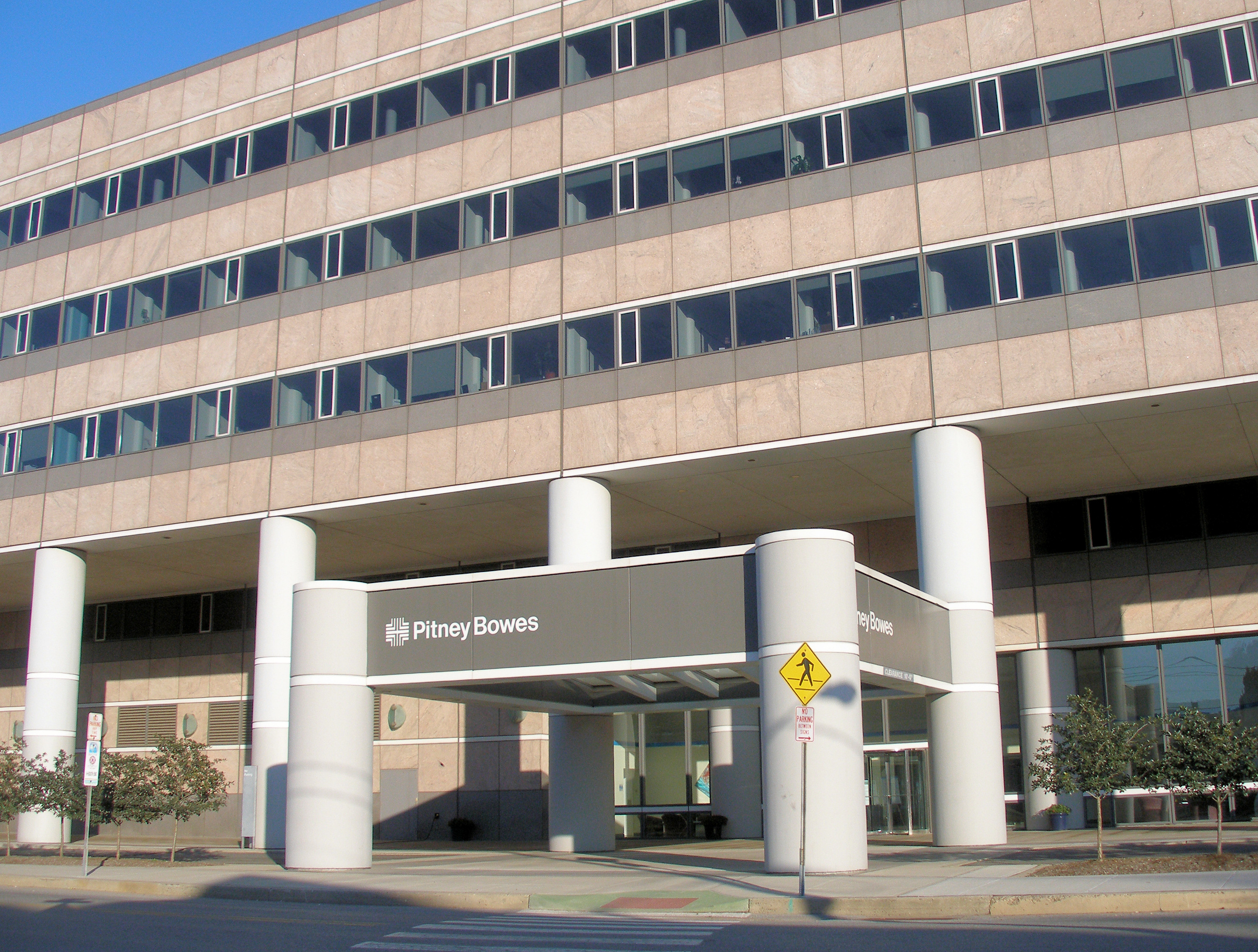
Pitney Bowes headquarters

The Pitney Bowes Corporation has a long history in the South End. In 1917, Walter Bowes moved his operations there, and in 1920 combined his firm with another to form Pitney Bowes. The company had manufacturing operations in the neighborhood for decades and its 422,000-square-foot (39,200 m^{2}) corporate headquarters is located at the southern end of the triangular peninsula at 1 Elmcroft Road, where about 550 people worked. Pitney Bowes sold their headquarters building to BLT in 2015, and moved their headquarters to Summer Street in Stamford. The building has been re branded as Silicon Harbor to attract startups to the area.

=== April 2006 fire ===
The biggest fire in Stamford's history started on April 3, 2006, in Building 15 of the old Yale & Towne factory buildings. The fire spread to another, 17,500-square-foot (1,630 m^{2}) building housing several antiques dealers. Dark clouds of smoke formed over the scene, visible from miles away. About 200 residents from homes on Pacific and Henry streets were evacuated. The biggest casualty was a firefighter who suffered a minor knee sprain.

Stamford Fire Rescue Department Firefighters used 1 million gallons of water in three hours. Then the water mains ran out and water from the nearby harbor had to be pumped in to douse the flames. The fire department spent $25,000 in overtime to put out the fire.

The complex at 735 Canal Street had been rented out by Antares Investment Partners of Greenwich to various businesses, including about 100 antiques dealers.

The blaze started as a fire on a workbench in a piano shop, although city fire marshals never determined the exact cause. City investigators found Antares had not fixed the sprinkler system, although it knew the system was broken when it bought the building in October 2005 from Heyman Properties of Westport. To fix it would have required cutting off the heat in the building as a new heating system was installed, and Antares was waiting until later in the spring or summer for that, Bruce Macleod, operations chief at Antares, had said, according to The Advocate, Stamford's daily newspaper. Heyman officials knew of the sprinkler system problems "and did nothing to fix them for years, the city's chief fire marshal said in April," The Advocate reported. The sprinkler system had broken in the 1990s, when heat was turned off in vacant parts of the building, causing water in the sprinkler system to freeze, cracking the pipes.

The antiques dealers filed a class-action lawsuit against Antares and the piano shop in July 2006.

=== Harbor Point and subsequent redevelopments ===
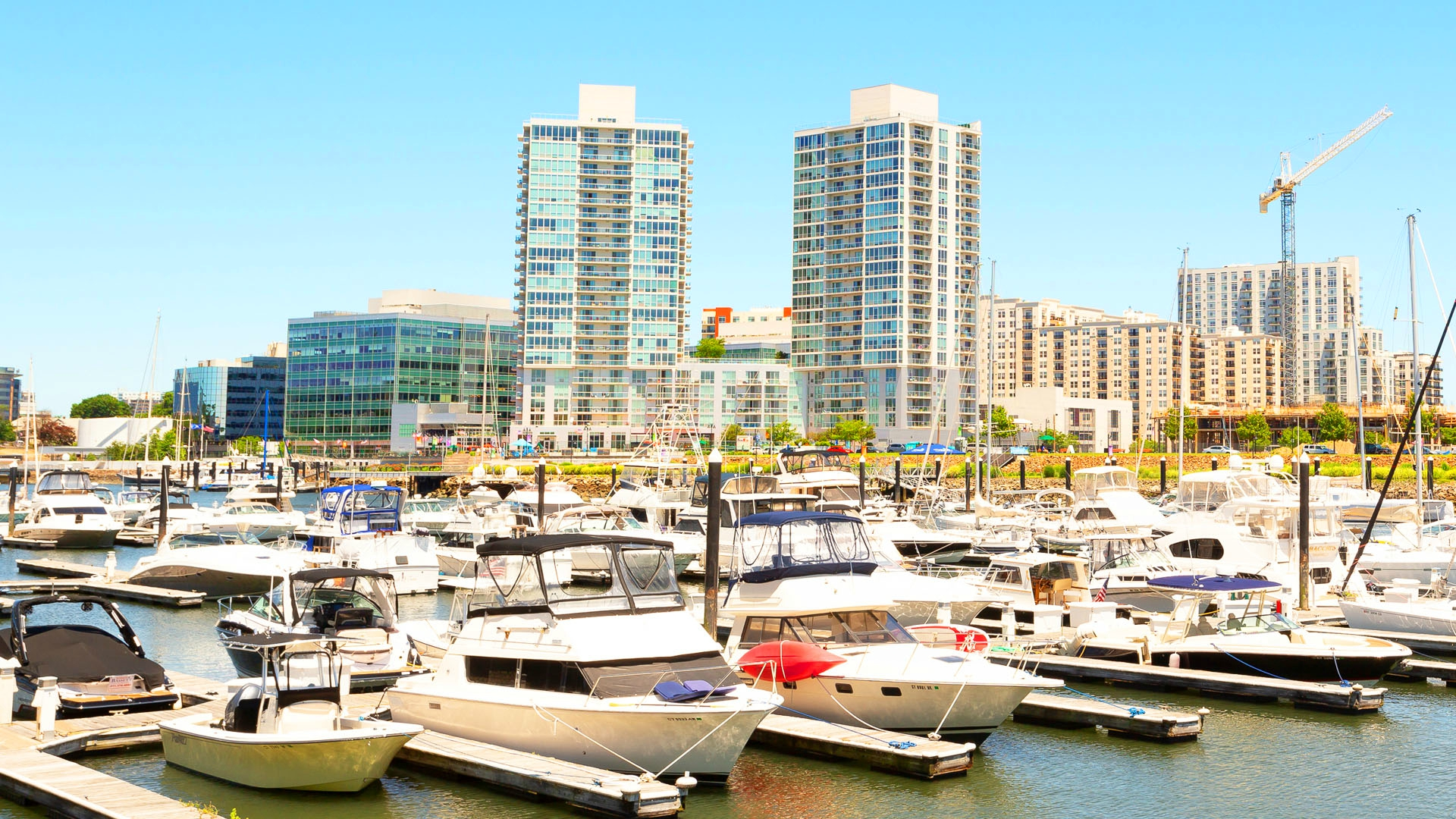
Marina in the Harbor Point redevelopment of Stamford.

Beginning in 2005, Antares Investment Partners began acquiring an array of properties in the South End of Stamford, and announced plans to redevelop an 80 acres (32 ha) portion of the neighborhood as part of a project called Harbor Point. The project, which one New York Times article called "one of the largest and most ambitious redevelopment efforts in the country", was sold to Norwalk-based Building and Land Technology (BLT), a private development company, in September 2008. The development included both the old Yale & Towne site, and the site of the former coal gasification plant off Washington Boulevard from Antares. The "Lofts at Yale and Towne", as they are now called, opened in May 2010, on property that once was part of the Yale lock factory located on Henry Street. In mid to late 2010 buildings at 100 and 101 Washington Boulevard were completed and are now home to the luxury apartment complex 101 Park Place and the new office headquarters of Building and Land Technology.

The 20-acre (81,000 m^{2}) Yale & Town site will have 300,000 square feet (30,000 m^{2}) of retail space in new buildings off Canal Street, along with the 225 apartments at the "Lofts at Yale and Towne" located in a century-old, six-story factory building on Henry Street, according to plans Antares presented to the city Zoning Board in early 2007.

Antares had originally said the retail space in its plans was only to service the South End neighborhood, but in summer of 2006 it submitted a proposal to the city Planning Board for 500,000 square feet (46,000 m^{2}). The Downtown Special Services District objected, and officials of that organization told the Planning Board at a hearing on August 10, 2006, that the retail space could hurt Downtown stores.

In 2009, Pitney Bowes paid an engineering consultant to study traffic in the South End, particularly in connection with plans for new office buildings and residences. According to the study, the new developments will clog traffic in the neighborhood, even with the planned improvements to Washington Boulevard and Atlantic Street (including reconstruction of the railroad underpasses of Atlantic and Canal streets) in the South End.

As of January 2018, about 2,750 of the 4,000 housing units planned for BLT's Harbor Point development were completed, along with some retail and office space. BLT's Harbor Point development has prompted a number of other developers to launch new projects in and around Harbor Point.

== Demographics ==
As of 2019, the South End has a population of 6,568 people. 42.3% of the South End is non-Hispanic white, 13.2% is non-Hispanic black, 5.2% is non-Hispanic Asian, and 3.0% belongs to an other non-Hispanic racial identity; 36.4% of the population is Hispanic.

The South End's median age is 31.8, lower than the Stamford total of 36.9. 15.1% of the South End is 18 years of age or younger, versus 20.5% of Stamford's total population. Just 3.8% of the South End is aged 65 or older, versus 14.4% of Stamford.

The per capita income in the South End is $63,946, higher than both the Stamford and Connecticut average. However, the neighborhood's unemployment rate of 6.5% is also slightly higher than the Stamford and Connecticut total. 50.7% of residents aged 25 or older have a bachelor's degree or higher, and 45.5% of households spend 30% or more of their income on housing.

== Fire Department ==
The Stamford Fire Rescue Department's Fire Station # 2 serves the neighborhood.

== Transportation ==
Interstate 95 forms the northern border of the South End. The Stamford Transportation Center, the city's main train station, is located in the South End.

== In popular culture ==
- Part of Elia Kazan's 1947 film Boomerang was shot in the South End, particularly at St. Luke's Chapel, and nearly all of the rest of the movie was shot in Stamford, especially the Downtown section.
- The musicians Moby and Battery Jackson once lived in some of the abandoned factory space in the South End.

== In the South End ==
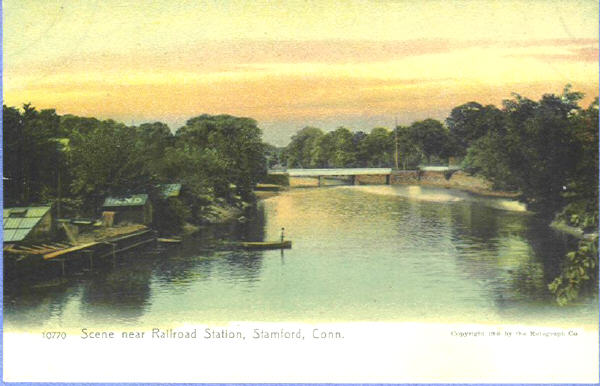
Mill River scene just south of Railroad bridge, circa 1905

- Koscusko Park, a city park — at the southern tip of the peninsula
- CTE Inc., an anti-poverty agency — 34 Woodlawn Avenue
- South End Branch of Ferguson Library — 34 Woodlawn Avenue
- Ponus Yacht Club
- Woodlawn Cemetery, a large, old cemetery — in the southeast part of the neighborhood

== See also ==
- National Register of Historic Places listings in Stamford, Connecticut
