= Harbor Point (Stamford) =

- Neighborhood
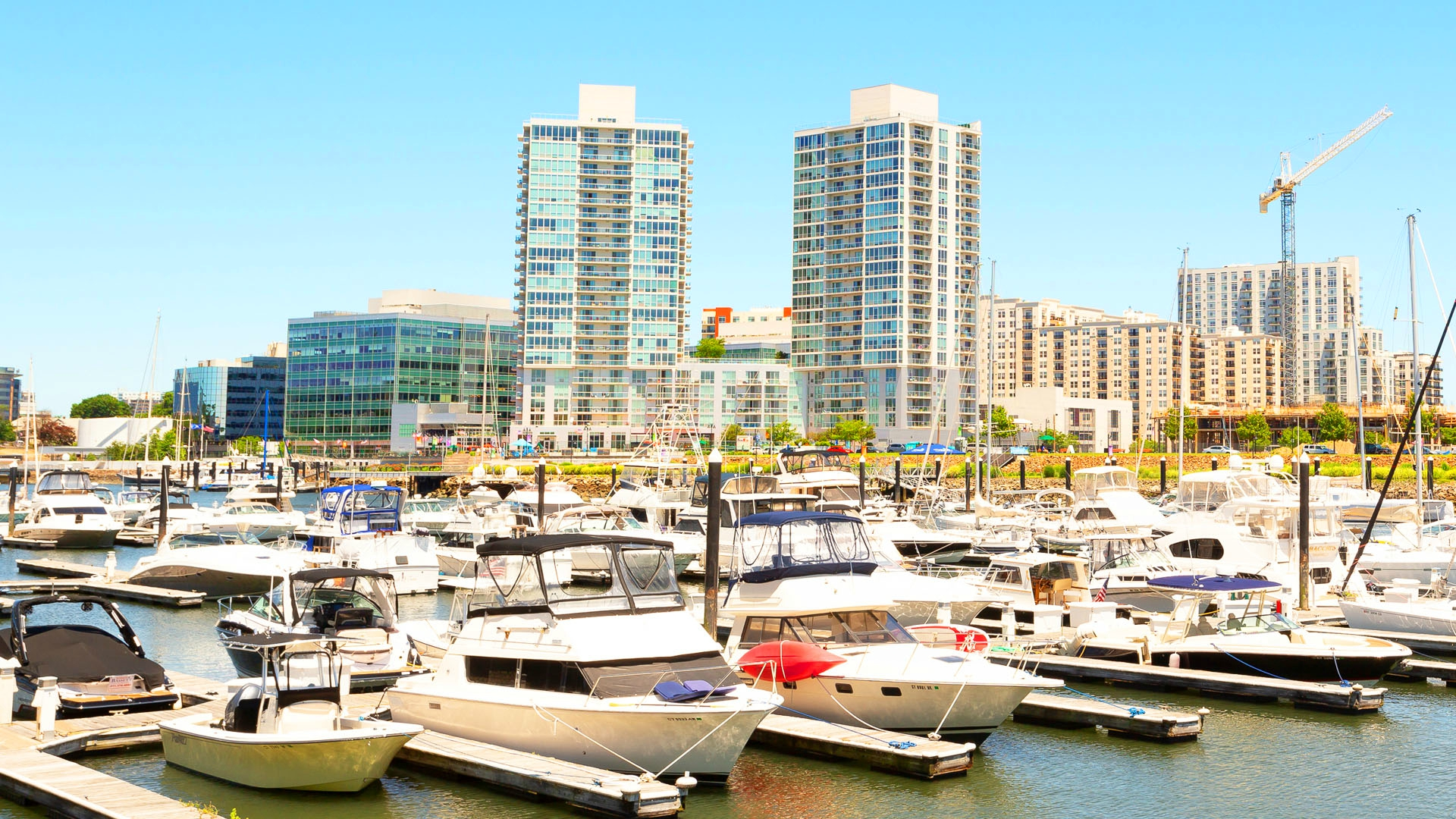
- Harbor Point Marina with offices and residential buildings in the background
- Country: United States
- State: Connecticut
- County: Fairfield County
- City: Stamford

Harbor Point is a redevelopment project located in the South End of Stamford, Connecticut, United States, in southwestern Fairfield County. Developed by Building and Land Technology (BLT), Harbor Point is a mixed-use development near the Stamford Transportation Center on Long Island Sound initially planned for 4,000 total units, and has since grown larger. The development also includes office buildings, restaurants, parks, and a boardwalk.

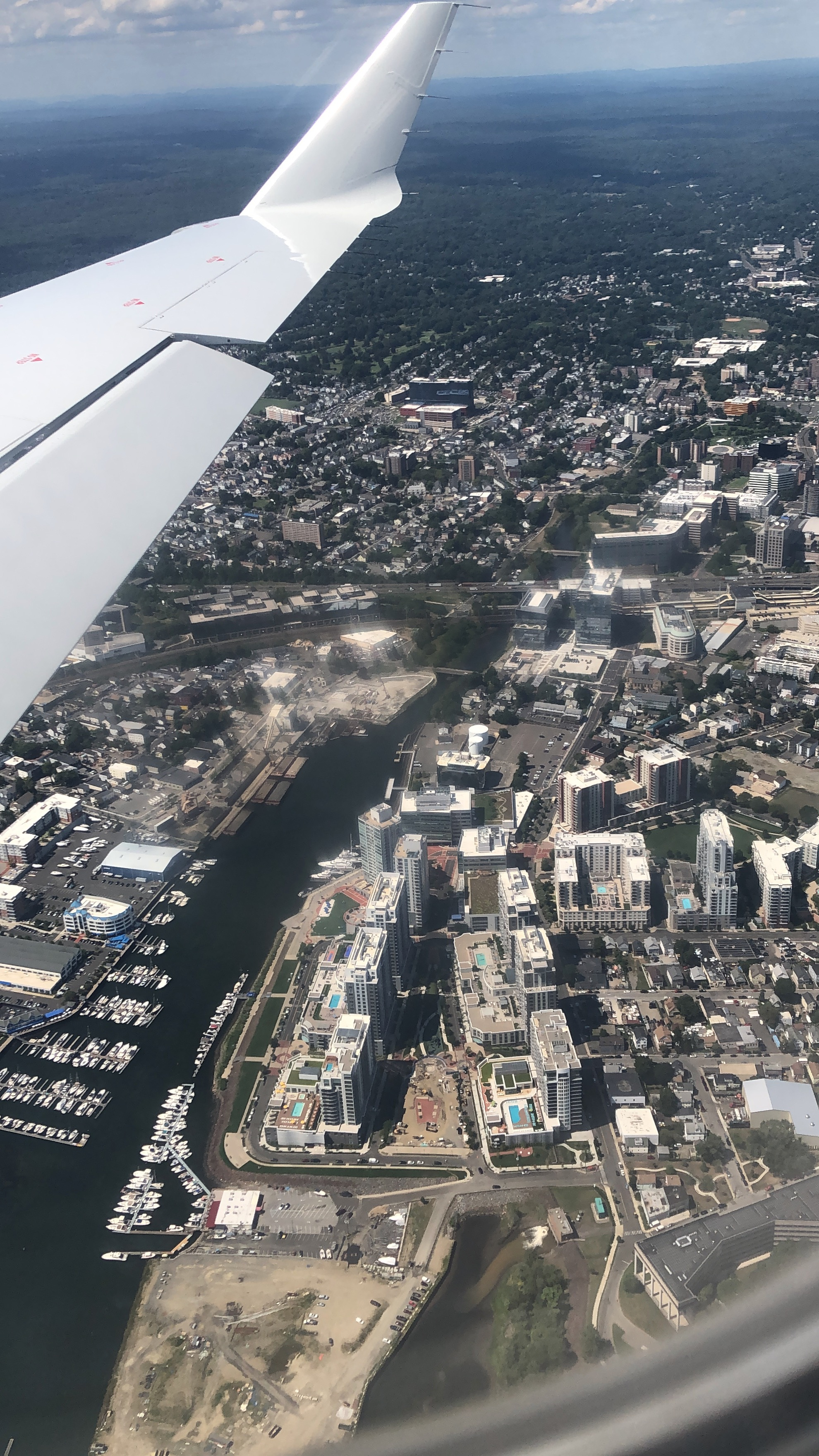
Harbor Point aerial view

The Stamford Advocate has called it "reportedly one of the largest redevelopment projects in the nation" and "the city’s fastest-changing neighborhood".

While the redevelopment has drawn praise from many in the city for revitalizing what was once a declining industrial neighborhood, a number of South End residents have raised concerns about its displacement of long-time residents and smaller businesses, large property acquisitions by developers, and the proliferation of short-term residents characteristic of gentrification. During the 2010s, census data showed that growth fueled by Harbor Point resulted in the South End's population becoming younger, wealthier, and more white.

== History ==
The area of contemporary Harbor Point was historically used for industrial purposes, dominated by the Yale & Towne Lock Works, which first located to the area in 1868. The company's presence fueled the area's economic growth, and by the 1890s, the Yale & Towne Lock Works had grown so large that it dominated the economy of Stamford at one point employing nearly 25% of the Stamford population. It would hold this position for over fifty years, during which time the city would be known as the "Lock City."

Beginning in 2005, Antares Investment Partners began acquiring an array of properties in the South End of Stamford, and announced plans to redevelop an 80 acres (32 ha) portion of the neighborhood as part of a project called Harbor Point. The project, which one New York Times article called "one of the largest and most ambitious redevelopment efforts in the country", was sold to Norwalk-based Building and Land Technology (BLT), a private development company, in September 2008.

By 2010, BLT saw residential growth which "exceeded" the company's expectations, but experienced more difficulty in attracting tenants for the redevelopment's office facilities. Connecticut's first Fairway Market, a New York metro area supermarket chain, opened its seventh and largest store—an 85,000-square-foot (7,900 m^{2}) store at Market and Canal streets in Harbor Point in November 2010. The Fairway Market was the first retailer to open in Harbor Point as part of the redevelopment. Throughout subsequent years, Harbor Point continued to see rapid residential growth, mostly due to an influx of higher-income individuals.

The Fairway Market was closed in August 2020, resulting in 109 layoffs. As of January 2022, no new tenants have moved into the building, which has been used as a COVID-19 testing site during the COVID-19 pandemic.

In April 2022, the Lofts at Yale & Towne, an apartment building converted from an old Yale & Towne factory which was one of the redevelopment's first projects, was ordered by the city government to be demolished after it was found to be tilting and sinking after its foundation was found to be unsound.

== Historic district ==
The South End Historic District covers a 177.1-acre (71.7 ha) area of the South End neighborhood including many areas in Harbor Point. The district includes 449 buildings, most dating from the 1870s to the 1930s, and also "an early naturalistic cemetery, and an iron bridge." Other notable buildings are Number 715 on Atlantic Street, a tenement building, and the Holy Name Rectory. The historic district includes the Pulaski Street Bridge, a wrought-iron lenticular through-truss bridge over the Rippowam River.

== Demographics ==
As of 2024, the Harbor Point development is largely inhabited by younger adults in the 20 to 44 years old age bracket. Harbor Point residents are disproportionately wealthier and more White than the South End at-large.

== Reception ==
The redevelopment of Harbor Point in the 21st century has drawn mixed reactions. Some have praised the project for bringing economic growth to a once economically disadvantaged part of Stamford, whereas others have disputed the economic impact on the local community, and have raised concerns about the quick pace of development and the affordability of the new housing built in the area.

A 2018 article in the Westchester & Fairfield County Business Journals praised the Harbor Point redevelopment for turning an area once "marked by pollution and high crime rates" into an environmentally-friendly transit-oriented development. The COO of BLT, the main developer of the initial development known as Harbor Point, said that the initial project brought in 30 restaurants and created thousands of jobs. The company has also highlighted the tax revenue the project has earned the city.

A number of local homeowners have raised concerns about the frenzied pace at which developers, led by the area's main developer, BLT, acquired properties. Others took issue with frequent attempts by BLT and other developers to purchase their own properties, as well as the allegedly low prices they offered.

Another concern raised by local residents is that most housing built as part of the redevelopment can only be rented, instead of bought outright. According to a January 2018 article by the Stamford Advocate, the average rent for a one bedroom apartment in Harbor Point is about $2,000 per month, and a January 2022 piece by The New York Times reported that the average one bedroom rent was $2,568. Units designated as "affordable" by Harbor Point's main developer, BLT, went for an average of roughly $1,200 as of January 2018, which some local residents have described as out of reach.

Some long-time residents have lamented the number of short-term residents the redevelopment has brought, and suggested that the redevelopment's focus on rental units has not created a large amount of jobs in the area. Concerns over the preservation of nearby existing structures has also been raised by some locals, who have proposed designating the area as a local historic district. In 2020, BLT took down part of a vacant factory on the National Register of Historic Places dating from the late 19th century. Residents of the redevelopment have hit back against claims that they're "not part of the community", saying that the area's recent changes have resulted in sizable economic growth. Some have also disputed claims of high turnover within the redeveloped units. Some residents of Harbor Point have raised concerns about crime and street lighting in the surrounding areas.

In addition, some building sites have been picketed by labor unions over alleged violations and unfair practices.

Environmental group Soundkeeper sued the Stamford Zoning Board for what it charged was a violation of legally required compliances with environmental, coastal management and local zoning laws. The case was dismissed in October 2018 by a state Superior Court judge.
