= Cummings Park =

Park in Stamford, Connecticut, US

Coordinates: 41°02′N 73°31′W

Cummings Park is located in Stamford, Connecticut, US. It is made up of about 79 acres (320,000 m^{2}) of shorefront property on Long Island Sound.

The main attraction of the park is Cummings Beach, which once had a seasonal harbor seal colony of which only a white marble seal statue is left. The park also has a playfield, four baseball fields, several basketball and tennis courts, rest rooms, a seasonal cafe, and a hillside that is popular among locals for winter sledding. A public marina, boat launch, and fishing pier are also located there.

Cummings Park is administered by the City of Stamford which sells monthly passes for parking access. It is named after Homer Stille Cummings, a former mayor of Stamford who was active in Democratic politics and later worked for Franklin Delano Roosevelt as U.S. Attorney General. He lived in town for most of his life and often went to the shoreline there for walking.
