= Westover, Stamford, Connecticut =

Coordinates: 41.082°N 73.571°W

Westover
- Neighborhood
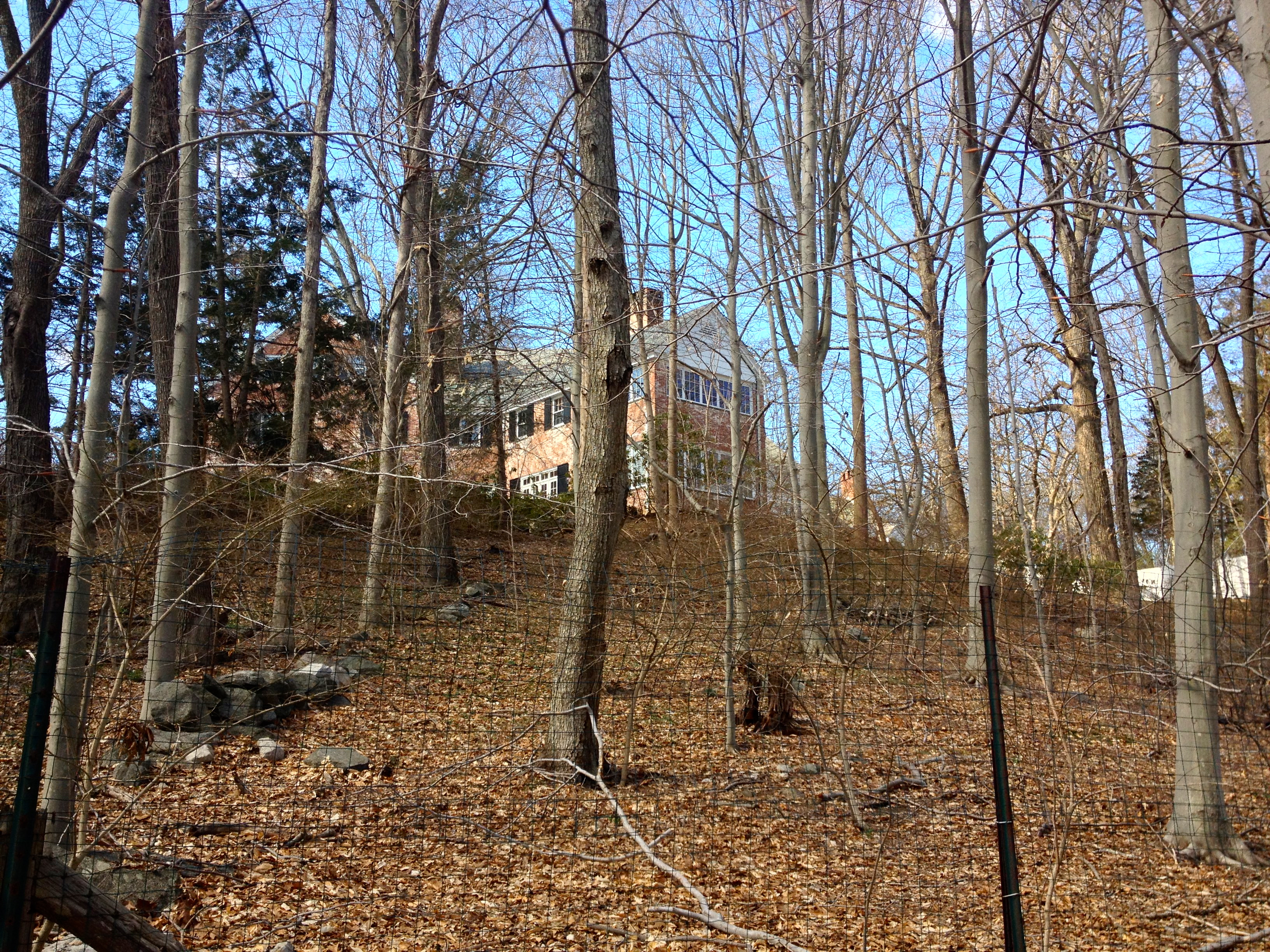
- Interactive map of Westover
- Country: United States
- State: Connecticut
- County: Fairfield
- City: Stamford

Population
  - Total: 11,203
- Time zone: UTC-5:00 (Eastern)
  - Summer (DST): UTC-4:00 (Eastern)
- Area code: 203

Westover is an affluent section of Stamford, Connecticut, United States. With a median household income of $186,607, it is one of the wealthiest neighborhoods in the city, along with Shippan Point and North Stamford. The neighborhood is bordered by Mianus River State Park to the west, the Merritt Parkway to the north, Stillwater Road to the east, and Palmer Hill Road to the south.

The neighborhood contains a mix of pre-war estates and large homes, as well as more modest homes.

== History ==
During the Revolutionary War, Fort Stamford was constructed in what is now Westover to aid in the defense of Connecticut from loyalist raids. At its peak, the fort was home to 800 soldiers. During the February 26, 1779 raid on Greenwich by William Tryon, General Israel Putnam rode to Fort Stamford to rally reinforcements. Troops from the fort successfully defended Stamford in a battle near Palmer's Hill and the Mianus River at the southern end of the neighborhood. In later years, residents of the neighborhood began referring to Fort Stamford as "Fort Nonsense."

Westover was originally home to several large estates, such as the Treetops Estate of Libby Holman, the Goodbody Estate of the Goodbody family, and the Fortland Farm estate of the Ogden family.

Westover Road was converted from a dirt road to a Macadam road in 1915.

== Landmarks ==
Westover is the home of Fort Stamford, a Revolutionary War era fortification. The Fort Stamford site also includes the Goodbody Garden, an Italianate formal garden from the former Goodbody Mansion which stood on the site until 1970s. The neighborhood is home to the Treetops Estate of actress and torch singer Libby Holman.

== Notable people ==
- Libby Holman had an estate in Westover, see Treetops (state park).
- Louis Schanker, abstract artist
- Marcus Goodbody, founder and chairman of Goodbody & Co.
- Robert Tuttle Morris, notable surgeon and writer
- Albert DeSilver, founding member of the ACLU
- Edmund Wilson, American author
- John Fowler, drummer of glam metal band Steelheart
- Peter F. Yacavone, President and vice-chairman of the Great Northern Paper Company
