= Fort Stamford Site =

Historic place in Stamford, Connecticut, USA

- U.S. National Register of Historic Places
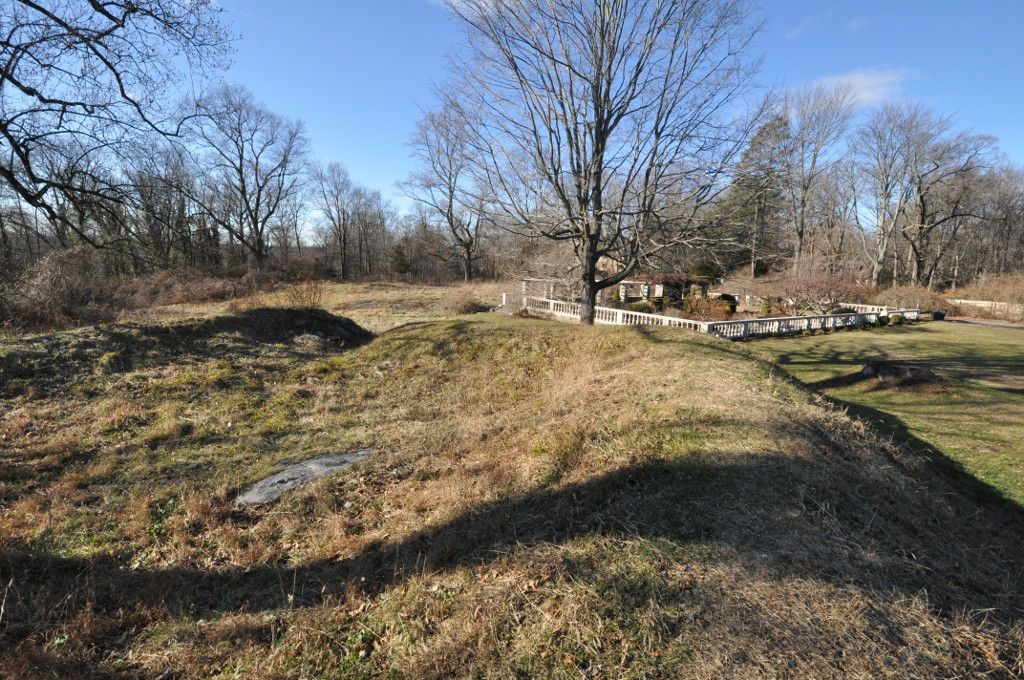
- View from atop the earthworks

- Location within Connecticut Location within the United States
- Location: Westover, Stamford, Connecticut
- Coordinates: 41°5′6″N 73°34′42″W
- Area: 5 acres (2.0 ha)
- Built: 1781
- NRHP reference No.: 75001920
- Added to NRHP: September 10, 1975

The Fort Stamford Site, site of Fort Stamford, is a public park at 900 Westover Road in the Westover neighborhood of Stamford, Connecticut. It was listed on the National Register of Historic Places in 1975. It is the site of the archaeological remnants of a military earthworks erected during the American Revolutionary War. With a clear view of the Mianus River and Long Island Sound, the fort was built as part of a ring of defenses to defend the New England Colonies from attacks by the British garrison in New York City.

== History ==
=== American Revolution ===
During the Revolutionary War, Fort Stamford was built as part of a ring of forts (others at New Castle, New York and White Plains, New York) by George Washington to aid in the defense of Connecticut from loyalist raids. The fort in its current form was designed by the engineer who constructed West Point, Rufus Putnam. General David Waterbury oversaw the construction in 1781. At its peak, the fort was home to 800 soldiers.

Some form of military camp or fortification existed at the site prior to the construction of the current fort. During the February 26, 1779 raid on Greenwich by William Tryon, General Israel Putnam rode to Fort Stamford to rally reinforcements. Tryon crossed the Mianus Bridge on the old Bedford Road (current day Mianus Road/Valley Road), but quickly retreated after seeing the size of the Fort's garrison. Troops from the fort then met Tryon in battle near Palmer's Hill and the Mianus River. A planned flank attack down what is now Westover Road from the Fort never materialized due to misunderstanding of the commanding officer's orders.

On July 2, 1779 during Banastre Tarleton's raid on Pound Ridge, New York, the 2nd Regiment of Light Horse under Colonel Sheldon prevented the fort from being directly attacked.

Later in the war, roughly 300 men manned the fort. When the war ended, the fort was considered no longer necessary, and was promptly sold. In later years, residents of the neighborhood began referring to Fort Stamford as "Fort Nonsense."

=== As a Private Residence ===
The area encompassing Fort Stamford was a private residence known as Fortland Farm, owned for some time by the Ogden family.

In 1926, the Stamford Chapter of the Daughters of the American Revolution dedicated a monument at the site. After a reception at Stamford Yacht Club, there a procession of automobiles up Westover Road to the site, where a fife and drum band played as the monument was dedicated. The monument itself was dedicated by Jean Parker Waterbury, a descendant of General David Waterbury who built the fort.

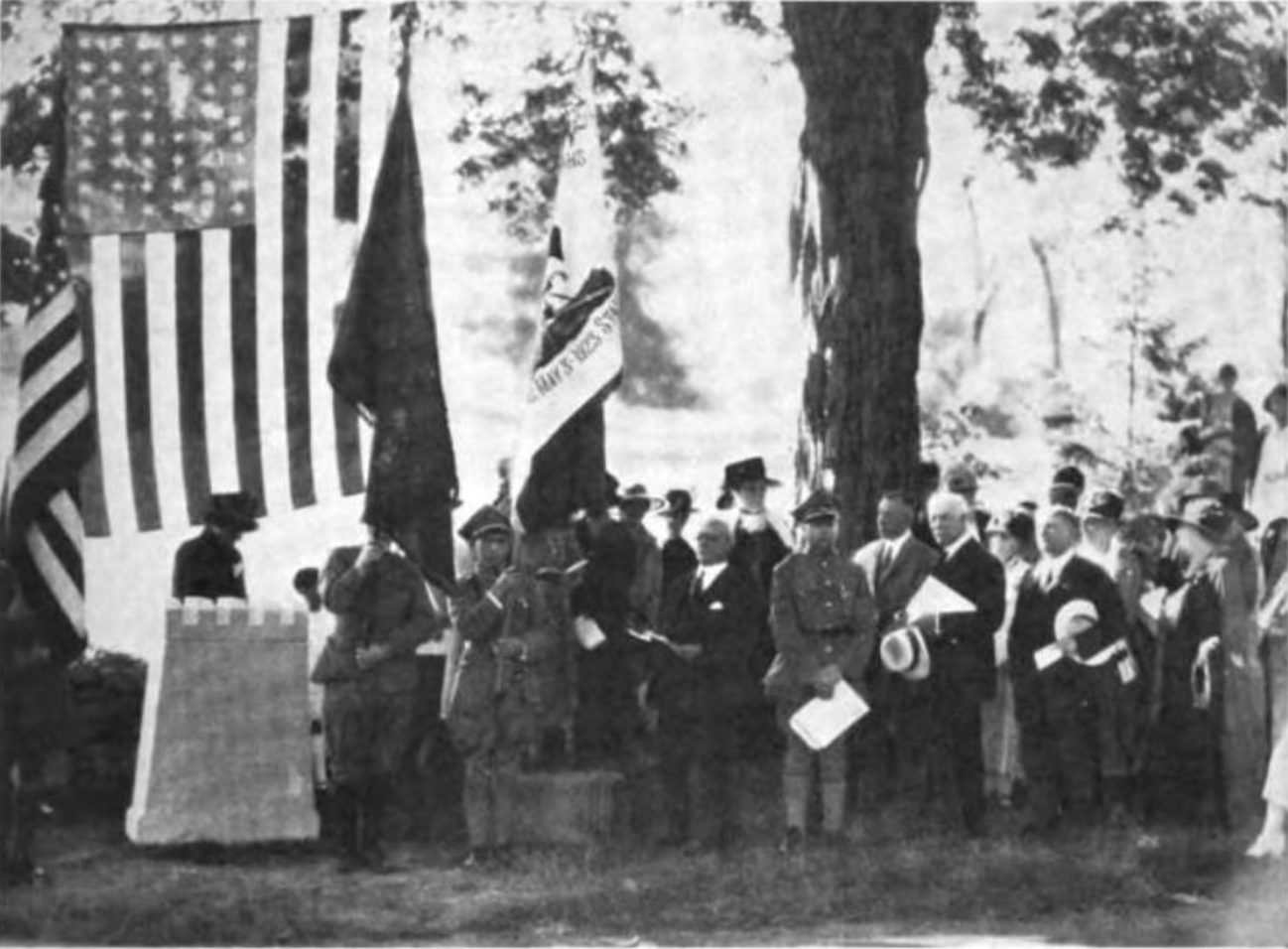

In 1928, stockbroker Marcus Goodbody, founder of Goodbody & Co. moved his family to the property. His wife Virginia constructed the Italianate Garden that still stands on the property, now known as the Goodbody Garden.

=== Fort Stamford Park ===
The City of Stamford purchased 5-acre property in 1972 from the Goodbody family, and the park features some of their garden structures in the formal Goodbody Garden maintained by the Stamford Garden Club.

In its current state, the Fort's parapets are mostly worn away. The remains of three of the four bastions are still visible.

== See also ==
- National Register of Historic Places listings in Stamford, Connecticut
