= Something to Remember You By (Howard Dietz and Arthur Schwartz song) =

Single by Libby Holman
- A-side: "Body and Soul"
- Released: 1930
- Recorded: September 1930
- Genre: Traditional pop
- Length: 3:16
- Label: Brunswick
- Composer: Arthur Schwartz
- Lyricist: Howard Dietz

"Something to Remember You By" is a song written by Arthur Schwartz and Howard Dietz in 1930.

"Something to Remember You By" was introduced in the musical revue "Three's a Crowd" which played on Broadway at the Selwyn Theatre, October 15, 1930, to June 6, 1931. "Three's a Crowd" starred Clifton Webb and Fred Allen and was produced by Max Gordon. It also featured Libby Holman; who introduced "Something to Remember You By" as well as the Johnny Green and Edward Heyman song "Body and Soul". Ms Holman was the first to record "Something to Remember You By" in September 1930 on the Brunswick label.

The song was also recorded by Helen Morgan on September 12, 1930, for Victor (with the B side being "Body and Soul"). That same year an orchestral version was recorded by Tommy Christian and his Orchestra with vocal by Jack Arthur. Later recordings were made by Vera Lynn, Jo Stafford, Irene Kral, and many others. Bing Crosby recorded the song in 1975 for his album At My Time of Life.

Films featuring the song include:

- Mr. Lucky (1943)
- Her Kind of Man (1946)
- Dancing in the Dark (1949)
- The Band Wagon (1953)
- The Telephone Book (1971)
- A Safe Place (1971)
- Alice, Sweet Alice (1976)

It was also featured on the television show "Casablanca" (1983).
