= Mianus River Gorge =

Nature preserve in Bedford, New York

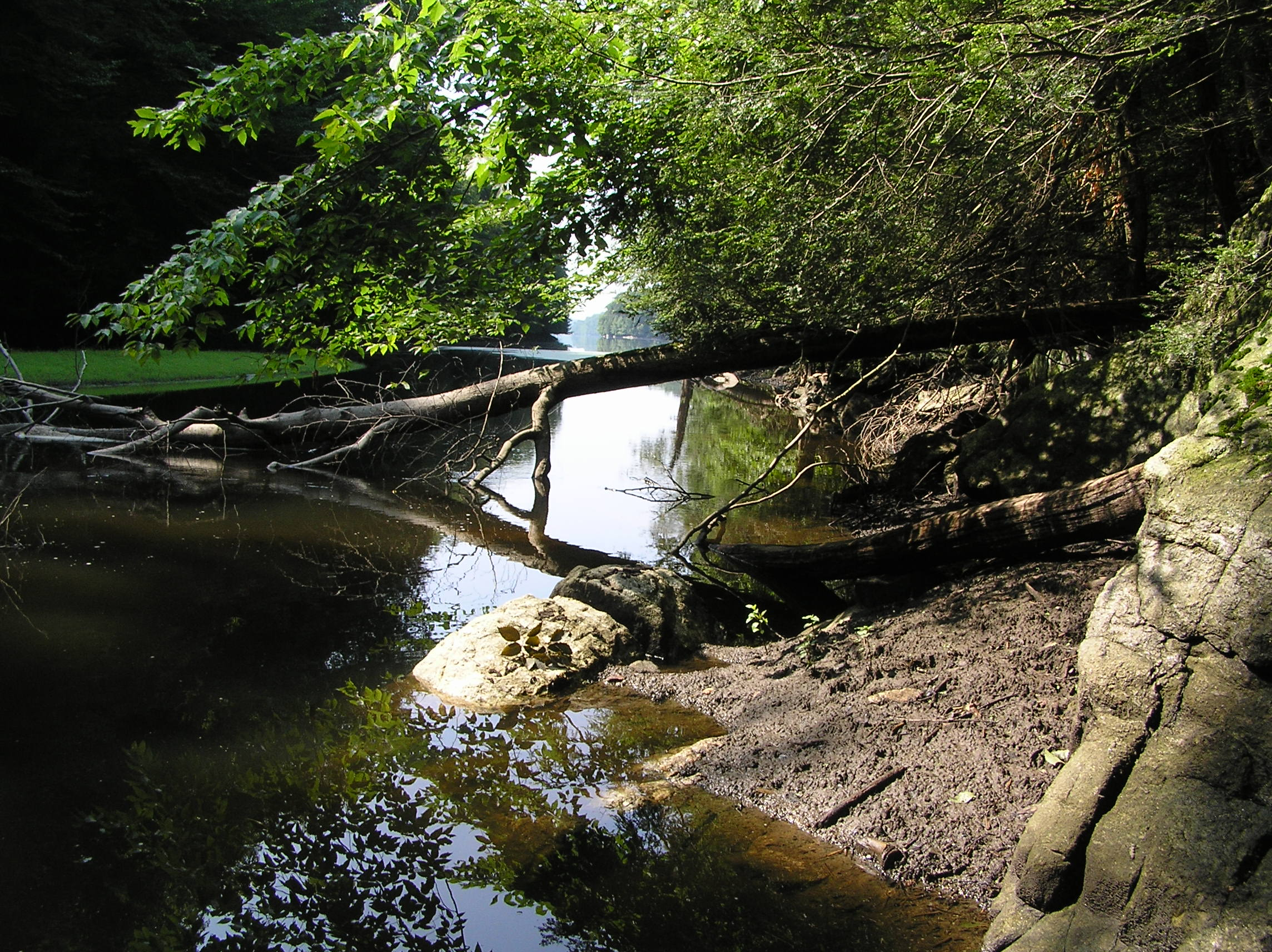
- The Mianus River Gorge as it approaches the Samuel J. Bargh Reservoir

- Location within New York
- Location: Town of Bedford, New York
- Coordinates: 41°11′09″N 73°37′17″W
- Area: 755 acres (306 ha)
- Governing body: The Nature Conservancy; Mianus River Gorge

U.S. National Natural Landmark
- Designated: March 1964

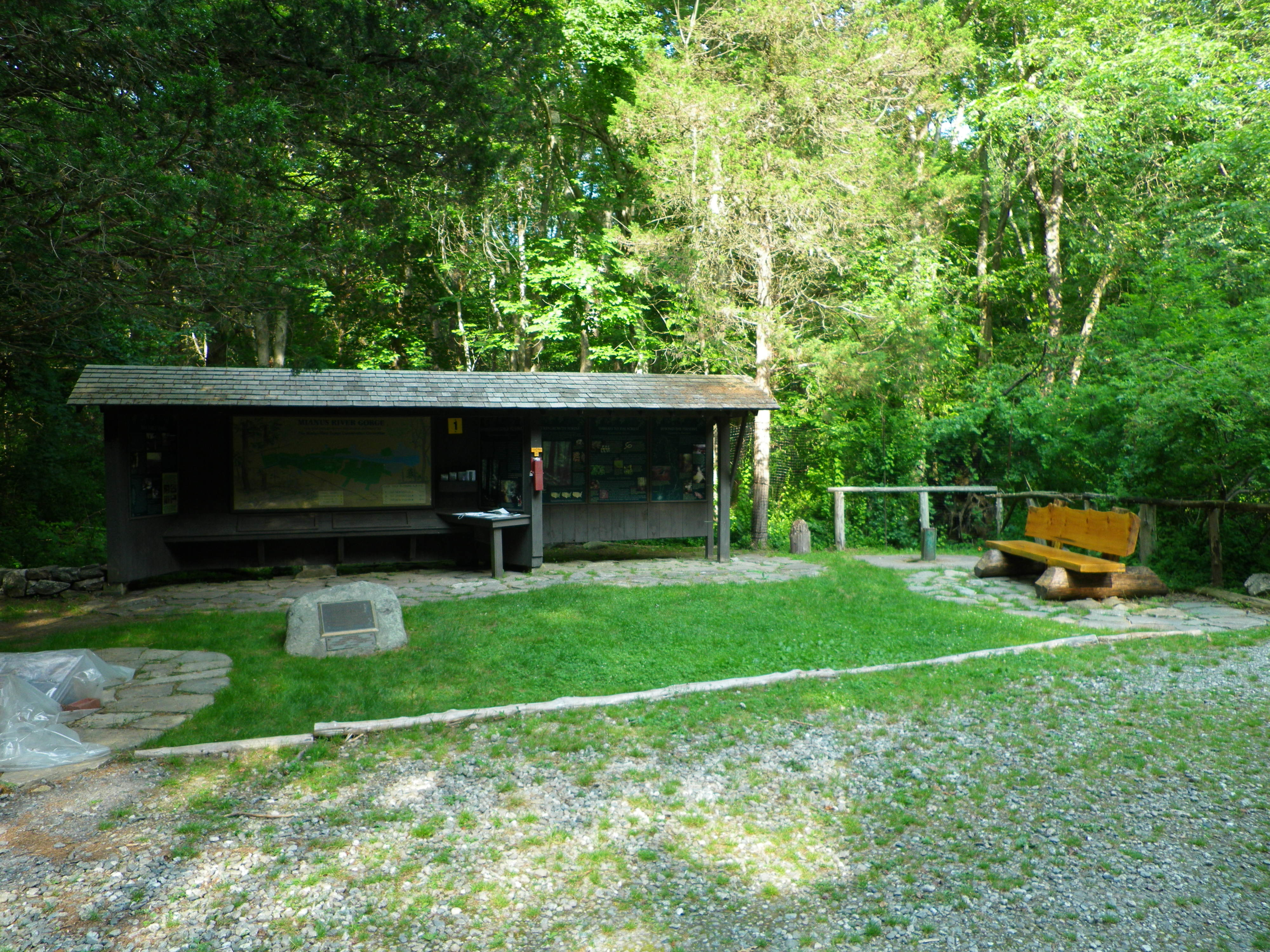
Entrance to the Mianus River Gorge

The Mianus River Gorge is a 935-acre (3.78 km^{2}) nature preserve in Bedford, New York jointly owned by The Nature Conservancy and Mianus River Gorge, Inc.. The first 60 acres (0.24 km^{2}) were purchased by the Preserve, with help from the Conservancy, their first land preservation deal. It has grown over the years and is still managed by Mianus River Gorge, Inc. In March 1964, it was designated a National Natural Landmark for its old growth climax hemlock forest and the gorge of the Mianus River.

== History ==
In 1954, Gloria and Anthony Anable reached out for help from The Nature Conservancy which pledged $7,500 to help purchase 60 acres (240,000 m^{2}) of land in the gorge, its first land preservation purchase.

In 1990, 17 acres (69,000 m^{2}) were donated as part of a development deal.

In 2007, The Nature Conservancy purchased eight acres (32,000 m^{2}) of adjacent wetlands to protect the gorge and its watershed.

== Geology ==
The gorge is a periglacial formation, carved by streams as the glacier retreated. It contains several types of bedrock including Bedford Augen Gneiss (an igneous intrusion from the Late Devonian period), Hartland Schist, Precambrian and Cambrian gneiss and quartzite. Cameron's Line passes through the preserve.

The old Hobby Hill pegmatite quarry is located in the northern section of the preserve. The Havenmeyer Falls is also part of the preserve.

== Wildlife and vegetation ==
In 2003, the Preserve began to manage its deer population via limited bow hunting. They did so to decrease the risk of excessive deer populations causing damage to the vegetation. They believed that very small scale reductions could effectively manage the population without adversely affecting neighboring populations due to the rose petal hypothesis of deer populations.

There are numerous species of trees, shrubs, vines, herbs, and ferns within the preserve.

== Access ==
The preserve is open from April 1 to November 30, 8:30 a.m. to 5 p.m. There are approximately fifteen miles (24 km) of well-marked hiking trails.

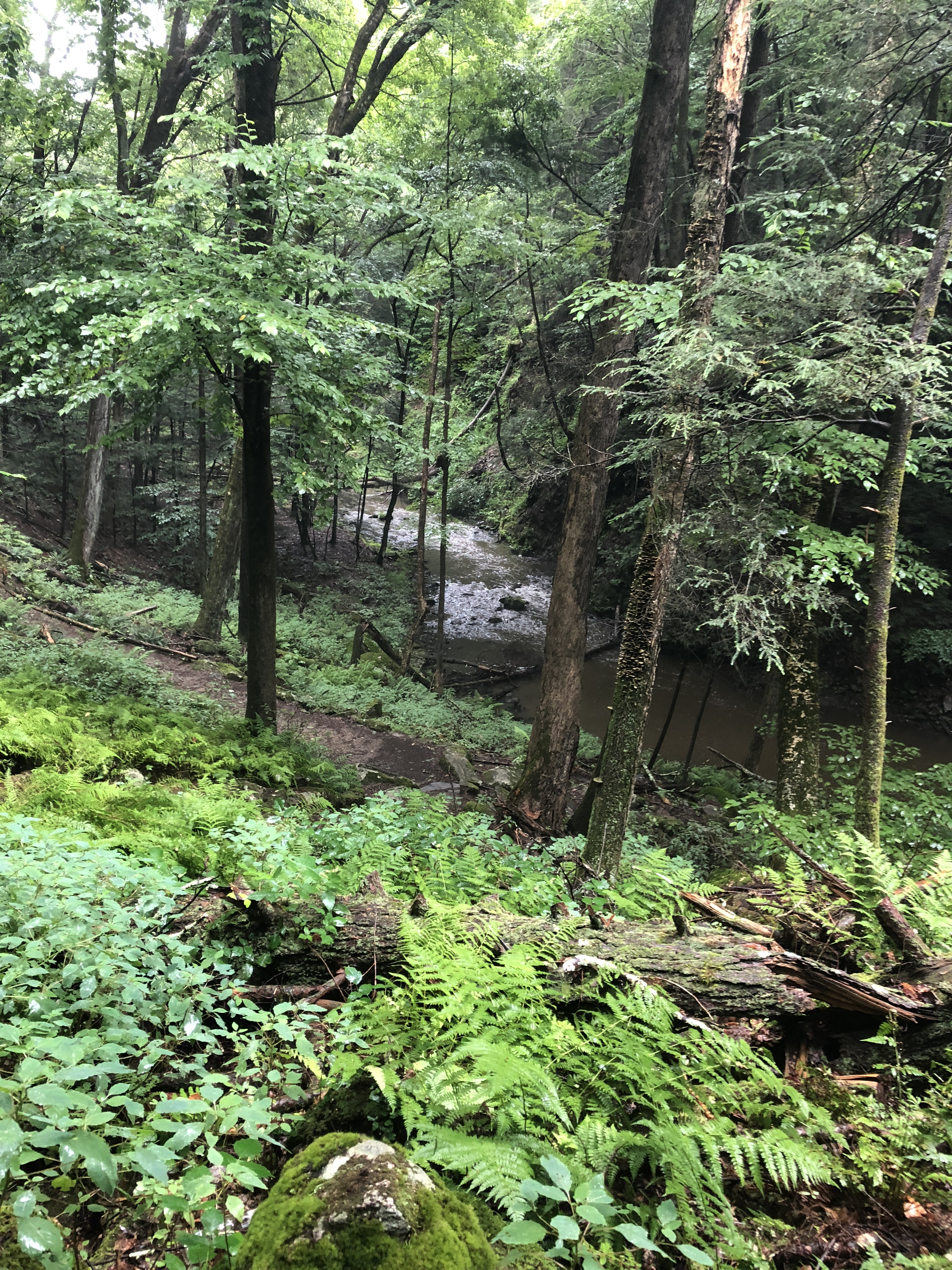
The Mianus River towards the start of the Mianus River Gorge trail in Bedford, New York.

== See also ==
- List of National Natural Landmarks in New York
- Mianus River Gorge
- Mianus River
