= Gloria Hollister =

American explorer, scientist (1900–1988)

Gloria Hollister Anable
- Born: Gloria Elaine Hollister; June 11, 1900; New York City, New York
- Died: February 19, 1988 (aged 87); Fairfield, Connecticut
- Education: Connecticut College (BA); Columbia University (MS)
- Occupation: Scientist
- Employer: New York Zoological Society
- Spouse: Anthony Anable

Gloria Hollister Anable (June 11, 1900 – February 19, 1988) was an American explorer, scientist, and conservationist. She served as research associate in the Department of Tropical Research of the New York Zoological Society (now the Wildlife Conservation Society), specializing in fish osteology, and she made record-setting dives in a submersible called the Bathysphere off the coast of Bermuda in the 1930s. During the 1950s, she helped to found the committee that preserved that Mianus River Gorge, which subsequently became the Nature Conservancy's first land project.

== Early life ==
Gloria Elaine Hollister was born to Elaine Shirley Hollister and Dr. Frank Canfield Hollister in the family's home at 264 West 77th Street in New York City. The home also served as the office and laboratory of Dr. Hollister, a physician and diagnostician who attended Physicians and Surgeons College at Bellevue Hospital. Through both of her parents, Gloria Hollister was of notable early American ancestry: her father was the direct descendant of Captain John Hollister of England, who settled at Wethersfield, Connecticut, in the early 1640s, while her mother's relatives included William Shirley, the final governor of the Massachusetts Bay Colony from 1741 to 1745.

As a child, along with her brother Frank, Gloria Hollister spent her summers at the family's summer home in Suffern, New York, at the foot of the Ramapo Mountains. It was here that she developed her lifelong passion for and interest in animals and the natural world. Her father encouraged this love and partnered with her to raise and care for prize-winning poultry and horses as well as a host of pet cats and dogs. Her father also satisfied her deep curiosity about the natural world by performing for her benefit dissections of specimens that died on the farm. Inspired by these sessions, she hoped to follow in his footsteps and become a doctor herself, but her father disapproved; he did not believe in women doctors. Instead, he guided her toward a career in the natural sciences.

=== Education and early career ===
In 1920, Gloria Hollister enrolled at Connecticut College for Women, taking her childhood love and applying it toward a major in Zoology under the tutelage of Pauline Dederer. She graduated in 1924. During her college career, she served as class president and graduated Phi Beta Kappa; she was also heavily involved in sports and played varsity basketball and soccer, was a high jumper and a discus thrower on the track team, and was chosen in 1920 as a member of the All-American girls' hockey team.

In Fall 1924, she continued her studies in Zoology at Columbia University, working under Florence Lowther and William K. Gregory. She received her MS in Zoology from Columbia in Spring 1925.

Following her graduate studies, she served as research assistant to the renowned biologist Alexis Carrel at the Rockefeller Institute, working in his laboratory on cancer research.

== Career with the Department of Tropical Research ==
In early 1928, weary of spending long hours inside of a laboratory and yearning for an opportunity to return to the outdoors, Gloria Hollister applied for a position with the famed naturalist William Beebe in his Department of Tropical Research (DTR) at the New York Zoological Society. Beebe was seeking a professional naturalist, skilled at dissecting, to join his staff for an upcoming oceanographic expedition to Bermuda. Dismissing concerns from some about the capabilities of women scientists, Beebe hired Hollister and several other women, including Jocelyn Crane, to join the team.

During the DTR's Bermuda Oceanographic Expeditions of 1928 to 1940, Hollister honed her expertise in fish osteology and continued this work in the DTR's West Indies Oceanographic Expedition (1932–1933) and the Pearl Islands Oceanographic Expedition (1934). In Bermuda she developed a new technique for preparing fish specimens in which the skin and internal organs of the fish were made transparent, rendering their skeletons far more useful for study than under previous methods. Her work helped to extend scientific knowledge about deep sea and reef fish.

Also in Bermuda, Hollister set the world record for the deepest dive undertaken by a woman. She performed the dive in the Bathysphere, a large steel submersible in which Beebe and the Bathysphere's engineer, Otis Barton, undertook deep sea explorations throughout the early 1930s. On June 11, 1930, her thirtieth birthday, she went down 410 feet for the women's descent record. In 1934, she would nearly triple her own record by descending to 1,208 feet. The dives were not simply feats for Hollister but, as for Beebe, a chance to explore the deep-sea world.

In 1936, having served as part of the oceanographic expeditions under Beebe's leadership, Hollister undertook her own expedition for the DTR, leading an exploring party 200 miles through the jungles of Guyana (then known as British Guiana) to the Kaieteur Plateau. Using a light plane on that trip, she recorded 43 waterfalls, many of which had not been observed by anyone outside of local peoples. Along the way, she also studied the golden frog, the rainbow tanager, and the elusive hoatzin, and brought back the first captive specimens of these animals to the Bronx Zoo, the DTR's headquarters.

Gloria Hollister lectured extensively on behalf of the DTR about the team's expeditions and scientific findings. Filled with her personal experiences and photographs as well as scientific information, her lectures were very popular, and through them she raised two-thirds the costs of the Guyana expedition she led.

Her expeditions, the publicity surrounding them, and her scientific publications brought her recognition. She was a member of the Society of Woman Geographers and later received their Outstanding Achievement Award. In addition to her mentors Carrick and Beebe, she counted among her friends Dan Beard, Lincoln Ellsworth, Amelia Earhart, Raymond Ditmars, Roy Chapman Andrews, Dorothy Canfield Fisher, and Martin and Osa Johnson.

== Marriage and career with the Red Cross ==
In 1941, Hollister met Anthony Anable, a chemical and metallurgical engineer, and they married that year. In December 1941, following the US's entry into World War II, Hollister resigned from the DTR and joined the American National Red Cross where she helped to found the nation's first blood donor center in Brooklyn, and later served as the assistant chief of the Speaker's Bureau of the American Red Cross in Washington, DC.

== Mianus River Gorge conservationist ==
In 1952, having settled in Connecticut with her husband, Gloria (now Anable) became enchanted with the Mianus River Gorge and subsequently concerned about its preservation. On December 12, 1953, the Anables, along with Edna Edgerton, James Todd, and Robert Hamershlag, founded the Mianus River Gorge Conservation Committee. The committee became a full member of The Nature Conservancy in 1954, and the Mianus River Gorge became The Nature Conservancy's pioneer land project.

In the summer of 1954, Gloria Anable undertook a major effort to acquaint local associations with the Gorge and the threats it faced from subdivision. She took more than 400 visitors through the Gorge that year, and support for its preservation grew. She served as the committee's secretary, chairman, and later chairman emeritus. In 1964, the Gorge became the country's first natural history landmark to be registered by the Department of the Interior. The preserve, originally 60 acres, now includes 770 acres, with another 176 acres under conservation easements.

== Personal life ==
Hollister married Anthony Anable. She spent the last three years of her life in the Carolton Convalescent Hospital in Fairfield, Connecticut, and died of cardiac arrest on February 19, 1988, at the age of 87.
