= Three's a Crowd (musical) =

1930 Broadway revue

Three's A Crowd
- Sheet music for the song "Something to Remember You By" from Three's a Crowd
- Music: Arthur Schwartz
- Lyrics: Howard Dietz
- Premiere: October 15, 1930: Selwyn Theatre

Three's A Crowd is a 1930 Broadway revue with songs primarily by Howard Dietz and Arthur Schwartz. It included the first performance in the United States of the Johnny Green-composed jazz standard "Body and Soul".

== Production ==
Three's A Crowd premiered on Broadway at the Selwyn Theatre on October 15, 1930, and closed on June 6, 1931, after 271 performances.

Howard Dietz conceived of and "compiled" the show. Dietz and others wrote the libretto. Dietz wrote most of the lyrics and Arthur Schwartz most of the music. Phil Charig, Vernon Duke, Johnny Green, Burton Lane, Alec Wilder and others also contributed music. The show was produced by Max Gordon, directed by Hassard Short and choreographed by Albertina Rasch. Albert R. Johnson designed the sets and Kiviette the costumes.

Clifton Webb, Libby Holman and Fred Allen were featured performers. Fred MacMurray played a small part.

== Reception ==
The New York Times opening night review said, "Those responsible for "Three's A Crowd", and Howard Dietz seems to be chief among them, have put together a bright, smart and tasteful show. It has a pleasant lightness, a sort of unforced gayety, and, for the most part, a quizzical, knowing point of view."

Stanley Green reported that "The piece that made the biggest hit, however, was the only one that Dietz was not associated with — "Body and Soul", by Johnny Green, Robert Sour, and Edward Heyman ... The best of the Schwartz and Dietz inspirations was "Something to Remember You By", a ballad of unhappy leave-talking sung by Miss Holman to a sailor who stood with his back to the audience. He was played by Fred MacMurray."

== Songs ==
Unless otherwise stated, Howard Dietz wrote the words and Arthur Schwartz the music. Credits are from American Song.

- "All the King’s Horses" (words by Eddie Brandt; music by Brandt and Alec Wilder)
- "Body and Soul" (words by Dietz, (Note: American Song credits Dietz in addition to the other three lyricists, though other sources do not. Note also that the song predates the show.) Frank Eyton, Edward Heyman and Robert Sour; music by Johnny Green)
- "Forget All Your Books" (words by Dietz and Sammy Lerner; music by Burton Lane)
- "Je T'Aime"
- "The Moment I Saw You"
- "Night After Night"
- "Out in the Open Air" (words by Dietz and Ted Pola; music by Lane)
- "Practising Up On You" (words by Dietz; music by Phil Charig)
- "Right at the Start of It"
- "Something to Remember You By"
- "Talkative Toes" (words by Dietz; music by Vernon Duke)
- "Yaller" (words by Henry Myers; music by Charles M. Schwab)
