= Libby Holman =

American socialite, actress, singer, and activist (1904–1971)

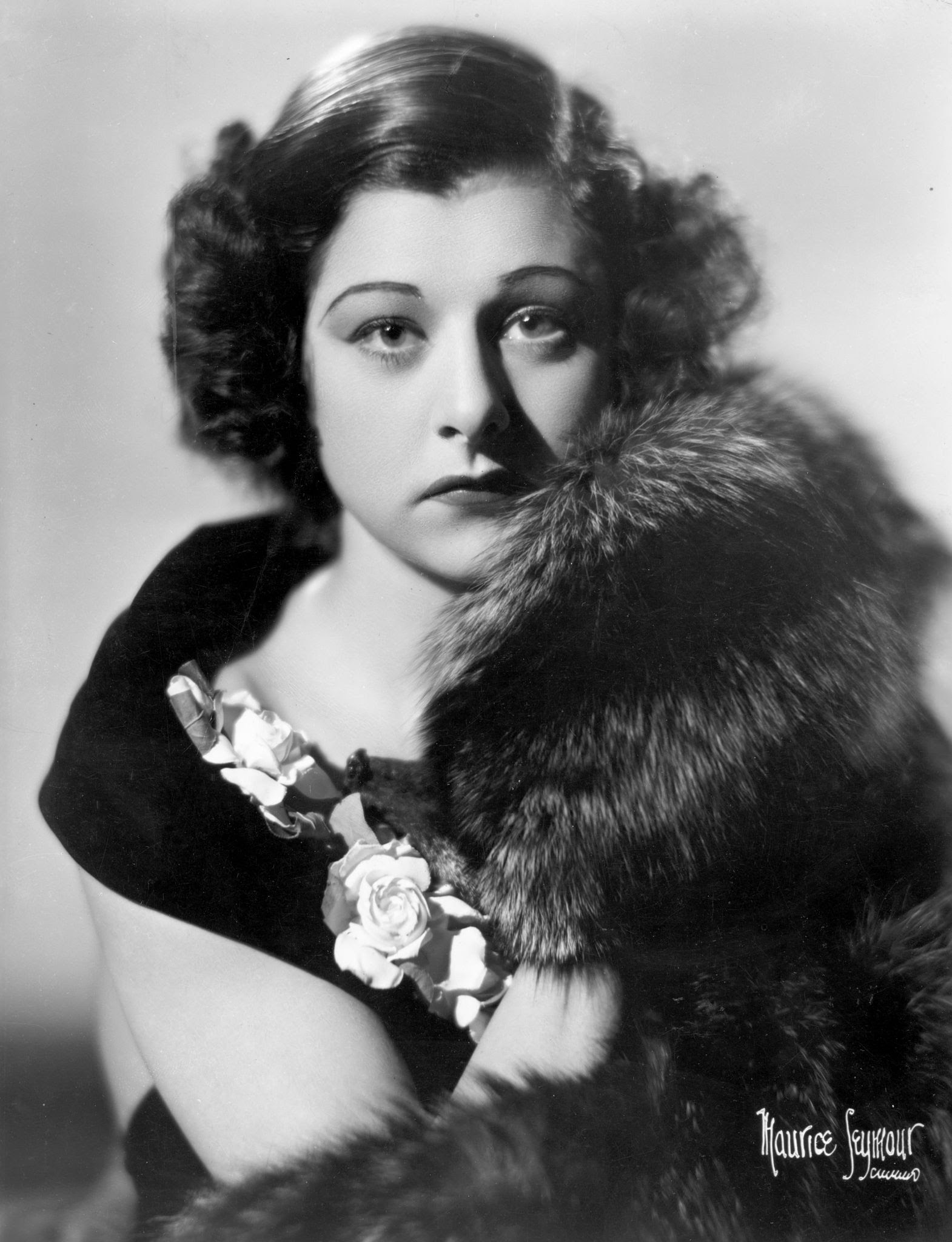
- Holman in 1935
- Born: Elizabeth Lloyd Holzman; May 23, 1904; Cincinnati, Ohio, U.S.
- Died: June 18, 1971 (aged 67); Stamford, Connecticut, U.S.
- Occupations: Socialite; actress; singer; activist
- Years active: 1924–1971
- Spouses: Zachary Smith Reynolds (m. 1931; died 1932) Ralph Holmes (m. 1939; died 1945) Louis Schanker (m. 1960)
- Children: 3

Elizabeth Lloyd Holman (née Holzman; May 23, 1904 – June 18, 1971) was an American socialite, actress, singer, and activist.

== Early life ==
Elizabeth Lloyd Holzman was born on May 23, 1904, in Cincinnati, Ohio, the daughter of a lawyer and stockbroker, Alfred Holzman, and his wife, Rachel Florence Workum Holzman. She had an older sister, Marion (1901–1963), and a younger brother, Alfred Jr. (1909–1992). Later in life, Holman subtracted two years from her age, insisting she was born in 1906, the year she gave the Social Security Administration as the year of her birth.

In 1905, Alfred Holzman discovered that his brother Ross had embezzled almost all the assets held by their stock brokerage business to cover Ross's gambling debts. Holzman & Co. ended up with liabilities of $250,000 ($8.96 million in 2025) and lost trading access to the New York Stock Exchange and the New York Cotton Exchange, leaving the Alfred Holzman family bankrupt. The family sold their Walnut Hills neighborhood home and for a year lived in the apartment of Alfred's younger brother Wallace, before moving into the dilapidated Cumberland Apartments in the Avondale neighborhood. Libby Holman would view this period of her life with shame and, during a visit to Cincinnati later in life with friend Paul Bowles, would refuse to allow him to see the home she'd grown up in.

Due to anti-German sentiment during World War I, the family name was changed from Holzman to Holman. Libby's sister Marion is named as Marion Holzman in the 1917 Hughes High School yearbook, but Libby is a Holman in the 1919 issue.

Holman graduated from Hughes High School in the spring of 1920, entering the University of Cincinnati in the fall. Yearbooks credit Holman in numerous school theatrical productions. A classmate would later remember her for doing impressions of torch singer Helen Morgan. She graduated early in 1923 with a Bachelor of Arts degree.

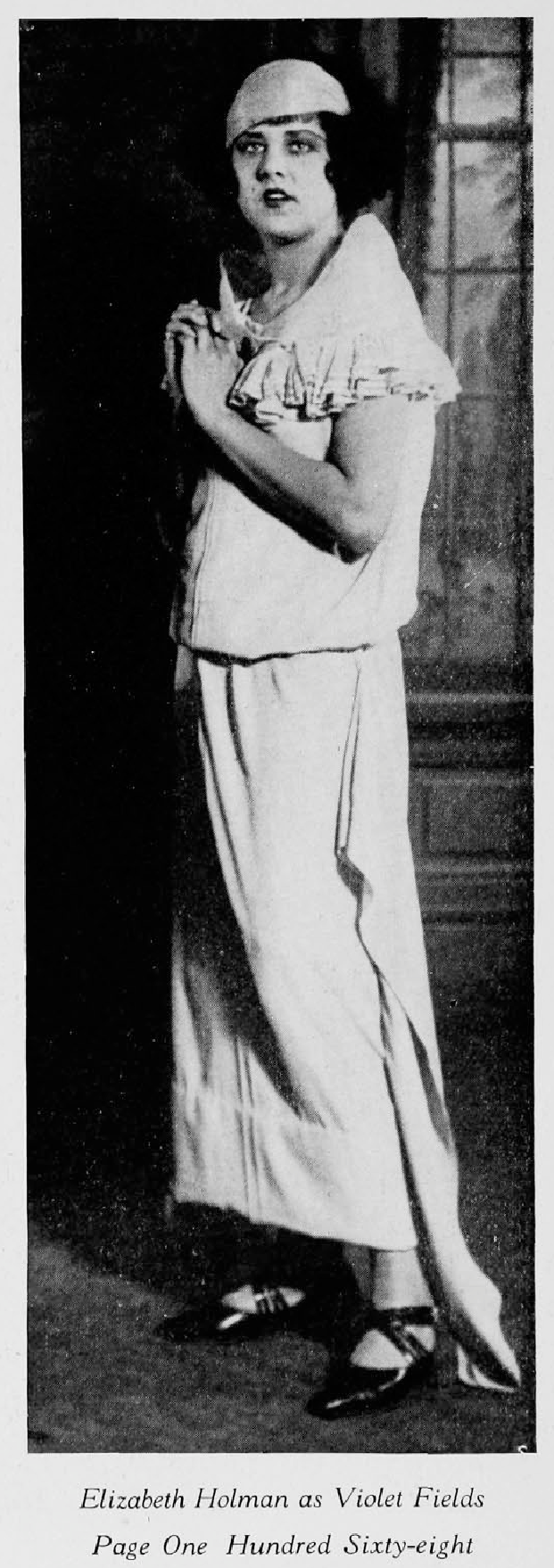
1923 yearbook photo of Libby Holman at the University of Cincinnati.

== Early career ==
Holman left her hometown in the fall of 1924 to pursue acting in New York City. She first lived at an all-women's dormitory at a YWCA and took classes at Columbia University. She began working for brothel keeper Polly Adler in the winter when her savings ran low, according to historian Debby Applegate: "Every afternoon she would arrive after her classes, carrying her schoolbooks, wearing the short skirts, oxfords and beret that were the thing among coeds, and settle down to work..." She was "pleasant, smiling, and matter-of-fact about her method of earning a living, and no matter what amount of money was offered her after her deadline of eleven o'clock [the curfew of the YWCA], her answer was always 'No.'"

Her first theatre job in New York was in the role of a streetwalker in a road company of The Fool (1925), written by Channing Pollock. Her Broadway debut was in the play The Sapphire Ring (1925) at the Selwyn Theatre.

Holman was in the chorus of the first edition of The Garrick Gaieties (1925), credited under "Elsbeth Holman," and was featured for the song "Black and White." The Gaieties contained the first successful music for the Rodgers and Hart songwriting team, and was one of the first revue-style revues that departed from the extravagant style of shows like the Ziegfeld Follies, Greenwich Village Follies, and Earl Carroll Vanities. By contrast, Gaieties was more minimalist and satirical, and didn't heavily rely on the showgirls and costumes that were at the heart of Ziegfeld-style revues. The biggest shows of Holman's career, The Little Show (1929) and Three's a Crowd (1930), were likewise in this newer style of revue, and they featured commissioned scores largely composed by a single lyricist-composer team (in the previous examples, Howard Dietz and Arthur Schwartz).

Holman was in a touring company of the 1926 Greenwich Village Follies, and was hired for the second Broadway run of the show from Fall 1926 to January 1927. Though Holman lived in straightened financial circumstances during her early years in New York, she patronized trendy nightspots including the Cotton Club, Texas Guinan's El Fey club, and restaurants Sardi's and Ye Old English Tea Room. Holman's friend Leonard Sillman helped her get signed to the musical Merry-Go-Round (1927) in which she sang the torch song Hogan's Alley solo. Merry-Go-Round marked the first time Holman was noticed and praised by critics in the press. Friends noticed Holman beginning to drink and party heavily at this point in her life. She also engaged in frequent crash diets.

Holman was catapulted into stardom with her lead role in The Little Show (1929). The Little Show originated with Sunday night variety shows held at the Selwynn Theatre by producers Tom Weatherly and James Pond that featured witty skits and songs that "were almost collegiate in their offhandedness and their cheerful violation of all the Broadway rules." Weatherly teamed up with producer Dwight Deere Wiman to produce a bigger show in the same style. It was imagined by Wiman and Weatherly “a revue, but not in any respect like the rhinestone creations with huge staircases of Flo Ziegfeld or Earl Carroll … It was to be topical and artistic, a witty travesty in the leitmotif, if possible.” The Little Show's eventual success would usher in the golden age of the Broadway revue. It was billed as an "intimate revue" due to its unconventionally small cast for Broadway production. In addition to song and dance routines, comedy sketches were included in the revue. Fred Allen debuted the famous George S. Kaufman sketch "The Still Alarm" in the show.

The Little Show's debuted at the Music Box Theatre on April 30, 1929. Its last act finished with the blues number "Moanin' Low" (music by Ralph Rainger). The song was accompanied by a self-contained sketch: the Jo Mielziner set was an expressionist rendition of a grungy Harlem tenement bedroom. Holman plays a mulatta prostitute who the audience sees hiding her earnings in her stockings. A black pimp, played by Clifton Webb in blackface, dances with her and makes love to her, until he discovers the hidden money after feeling up the girl's leg. Webb's character then throws her to the floor and chokes her and, beginning the song, does an erotic Earl "Snake Hips" Tucker dance. The pimp saunters out of the apartment and Holman's character throws herself to the door, beating it with her fists, then lamenting with the Moanin' Low ballad. The opening night performance earned Holman a dozen curtain calls, drew raves from the critics and became her signature song. The Little Show became a smash hit, ultimately running for 321 performances. Walter Winchell reviewed Holman as "the torch singer par excellence—the best of those female troubadours with voices of smoke and tears, who moan and keen love's labors lost to the rhythm and boom of the Roaring Twenties." Holman's Brunswick recording of "Moanin' Low" became one of her best-selling records.

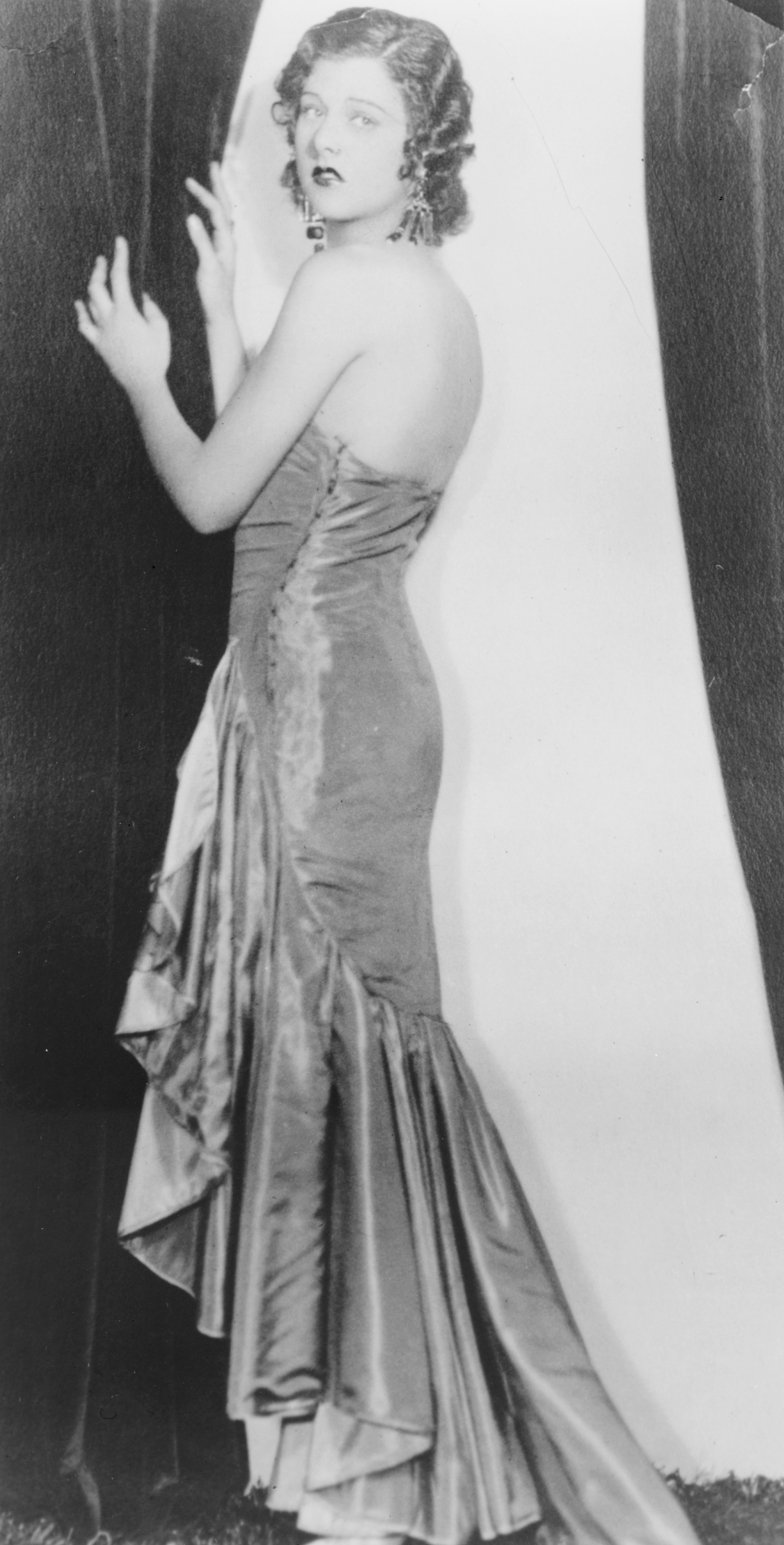
Libby Holman ca. 1930

The success of The Little Show lead to the producer Max Gordon joining the same core cast of Holman, Webb, and Allen for the revue Three's a Crowd (1930), with music again by Howard Dietz and Arthur Schwartz. The show opened October 15, 1930, and ran for 272 performances. During Gloria Swanson's visit to New York in 1931, she later remembered “The only musical I was dying to see was Three’s a Crowd, which starred Libby Holman, Fred Allen, and my outrageous darling Clifton Webb.”

Production was troubled on Three's a Crowd; Holman's main number "Body and Soul" was difficult to get right. Ralph Rainger, composer for Moanin' Low, was eventually brought on to provide a new orchestral arrangement. Holman later related: “In Philadelphia, I first did ‘Body and Soul’ on my knees. On a pulley. The stage was totally dark. I sang ‘I’m lost in the dark…’ Boom! A spot hit my face. I sang the next line, ‘Where is the spark for my love?...’ The pulley jerked me forward. They turned on the tiny footlights. I sang the next line. Another jerk! It was awful. The damn thing was making such a racket nobody could hear me. I really got sick over it. They tried putting the song in different places in the show. They got Johnny Green to arrange and conduct it. Nothing worked. I even hung up a sign on my dressing room door, ‘TWO’S COMPANY—ONE GOT SICK.’”

Holman introduced the Dietz-Schwartz standard "Something to Remember You By" in Three's a Crowd. During this number, Holman sang towards a departing sailor character waiting for the whistle of his ship, played by Fred MacMurray, who stood with his back to her and her ballad. Holman also sang a rendition of Body and Soul that would be recorded as one of the biggest 1930s radio hits.

Holman was typecast in her early career as a white woman who played mixed-race characters. These characters were often "tragic mulattas" or sexualized hard-boiled types; for example, her role in Rainbow (1928) was a cigar-smoking prostitute. Holman, a white Jewish woman with a tan skin tone, was often viewed by others to be racially ambiguous; she once recounted an incident to an interviewer where she'd been harassed by New York police while taking a walk with a white man, as the police assumed they were an interracial couple. She was also offered a part in Rang Tang in 1927 under the assumption she would pass as black. Holman would claim she got her first career break because she "passed as black passing as white." The media would label her a torch singer due to her unique sound within these roles, described in terms like "bottled blue smoke" or a "grunting style."

== Recording career ==
Holman was a Brunswick Records recording artist by 1927, and released at least 10 78 rpm singles for the label under her own name. Additionally, the label recorded Holman with studio pickup bands including The Cotton Pickers for the 1929 single "He's A Good Man To Have Around" (Brunswick 4447) and The Colonial Club Orchestra for the 1929 single "I'm Doing What I'm Doing For Love" (Brunswick 4453). She occasionally recorded for other labels during the late 1920s and early 1930s, including with another pickup band named "The Knickerbockers," with whom she recorded Rodgers & Hart's "My Man Is On The Make" (Columbia 2067-D) in 1929. Holman's Brunswick recordings frequently featured torch songs that later became standards in traditional pop and jazz, including "Am I Blue?," "Moanin' Low," "Can't We Be Friends?," "Body and Soul," "Love for Sale," and "More Than You Know." Though there were not commercial music charts like the Billboard Hot 100 in the United States in the 1920s and 1930s, the book Joel Whitburn’s Pop Memories (1890–1954) uses phonograph record sales data and radio performance reports to show that five of Holman's singles were among the top 10 most popular recordings in the country at specific times between 1929 and 1931, and another 4 singles were in the equivalent of the top 20.

In 1942, Holman shifted her focus to blues and American folk music, recording a six-song album (consisting of three 78 rpm records) titled Blues Till Dawn (Decca A-316). On this album, she recorded songs by or associated with Clarence Ashley, Ma Rainey, Leroy Carr and other folk and blues artists, accompanied by Josh White on guitar. In 1954, she self-released a similar album titled Sings Blues, Ballads & Sin Songs to promote a one-woman show of the same title at the Bijou Theater on Broadway.

The last commercial recording Holman released during her lifetime was the 1966 Monmouth-Evergreen Records LP The Legendary Libby Holman, on which she re-recorded material from earlier in her recording career, including her folk, blues and Broadway repertoire. Monmouth also released Something To Remember Her By (Previously Unreleased Performances From 1945 And 1965 Including Her Last Performance) in 1974.

== Personal life ==
In the industry, press, and among friends, Holman was known for her bold personality. She was the frequent subject of contemporary gossip columns, and was billed by Brooks Atkinson in his review for The Little Show as "the dark purple menace." Memories of friends, acquaintances, and colleagues detail the stage manner and individuality she was known for. Lucinda Ballard remembered “[She had a] certain quality which doesn’t show up in photos. Her skin had extraordinary texture and while her hair often looked messy, it had a beautiful sheen." Howard Dietz, who described her as "the swarthy, sloe-eyed houri," recalled:

No one in the theatre was more discussable than Libby Holman, who came from Cincinnati and was game for anything...She did outrageous things. For example, one Friday she said she was tired of being nice and proposed that on the weekend at the Henri Souvaines to which we were both invited we should act disagreeably instead of our usual selves. I said I didn’t think I could carry it off. ‘Well, try,” said Libby. Mabel showed us the garden and Libby said, 'I hate flowers.' Henri, who is a well-known composer, played one of his songs and Libby said 'I don’t like what you’re playing.' Mabel caught on to her line and said to Libby, 'I don’t like you.' It was the beginning of a great friendship.

Additionally, Leonard Sillman remembered of her:

She was a large girl with a fuzzy head of hair. She had slits for eyes and a bee-stung mouth and a somewhat unreliable singing voice. When she felt good, she was a fabulous singer. When she was not fabulous, she was flat. She went around in a ratty old beret and an overcoat made from the pelts of one fox and several rabbits with rabies. From all this, I realize, it may be difficult to conjure up an image of a rather fey, irresistible enchantress. But that’s exactly what she was; she could exert a strange fascination. There was a boy in the show we all called ‘horseface.’ He has such a lech for Libby that he followed her around like a puppy, which meant following me around because by that time I was never far behind the witch myself. After the show each night, the three of us would sit around till dawn drinking milk, eating coleslaw, and hating life. It was at one of these bull and beef sessions one night that Libby got up, walked to the writing desk and proceeded to write a letter. She put it in an envelope and left the room. I picked up the envelope and saw that it had been addressed to—of all people—Miss Libby Holman. Naturally, I read the letter. It said: "My divine Libby, how can you tolerate two such stupid people as Leonard and Horseface? They are without doubt the most dreadful, most common and vulgar people I have ever seen. I love you, divine Libby, wonderful Libby, beautiful Libby. Love, love, Libby."

Holman had a variety of relationships with both men and women during her lifetime. Although friends observed her to be a "ball breaker" with men, she was tender and intimate in her same-sex relationships. Her most prominent relationship was with DuPont heiress Louisa d'Andelot Carpenter whom Holman met in 1929. The couple's relationship lasted until Holman's death in 1971 (during which time Holman had three marriages to others). During Holman's Broadway career, they went to parties and jaunts in Harlem dressed identically in men's suits in bowler hats, joined by other lesbian and bisexual contemporaries such as Beatrice Lillie, Joan Crawford, Tallulah Bankhead, Ethel Waters, Kay Francis and Marilyn Miller. Louisa Carpenter was to play a significant part throughout Holman's lifetime despite their relationship not being monogamous; Carpenter was also closely involved with Tallulah Bankhead, Bankhead's sister Eugenia "Sister" Bankhead, and Tamara Geva throughout her life.

Holman was an enthusiastic participant in the white appetite for the Harlem Renaissance, when, according to Langston Hughes, "the Negro was in vogue." Holman enjoyed going to Harlem with friends to haunts like Connie's Inn, Smalls Paradise, or the notable gay speakeasy Clam House. Biographer Milt Machlin speculates that Libby also engaged with the drug scene due to influence from friends like Tallulah Bankhead and lover Jeanne Eagels, who were prolific users.

Holman met actress Jeanne Eagels during The Little Show's run through mutual friend Clifton Webb. Eagels was a close friend and serious romance of Holman's. The troubled Eagels moved in with Holman fulltime mid-1929. Holman was devastated after Eagels' sudden death in October 1929, likely from an overdose of chloral hydrate, and went through a period of depression afterwards.

Holman took an interest in one fan, Zachary Smith Reynolds, a hobbyist aviator and heir to the R.J. Reynolds Tobacco Company, 7 years her junior. He was known to friends and family as just "Smith." They met in Baltimore, Maryland, in April 1930, after he saw her perform in The Little Show. He asked his friend Dwight Deere Wiman, the producer of the show, to introduce him to her. He pursued her around the world in his plane and became known as "Smitty, the traveling bear" in Holman's friend group, referencing his pet-like devotion to following her around the world. Although Holman's friends didn't like Reynolds, finding him moody and difficult to talk to, they tolerated his presence, as he paid for the entourage's visits to New York speakeasies and nightclubs. The couple argued often and occasionally descended into fights in front of Holman's circle of friends.

Holman and Reynolds married on November 29, 1931, in the parlor of the Justice of the Peace's house in Monroe, Michigan.

=== Death of Zachary Smith Reynolds ===
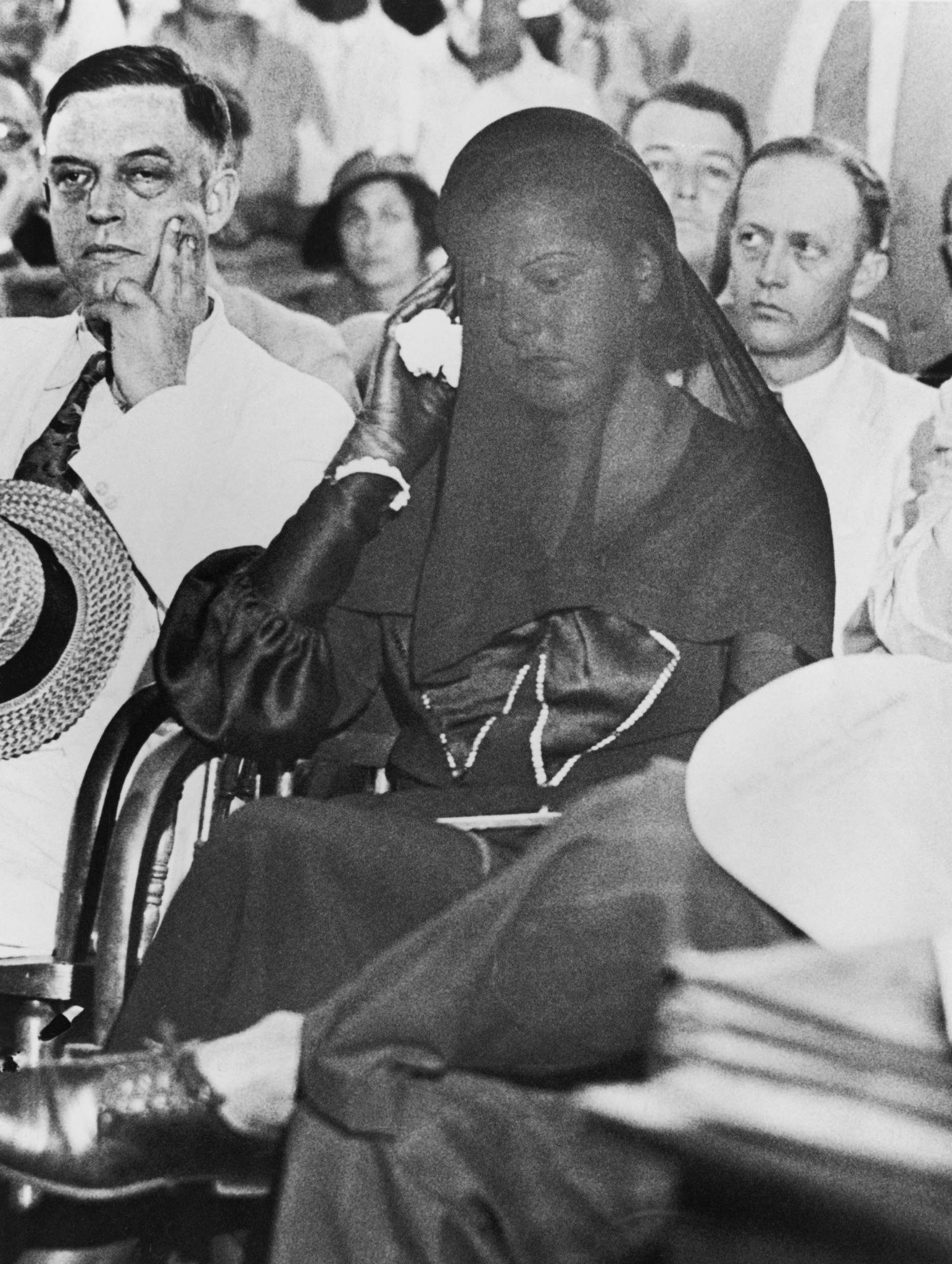
Holman at her bond hearing in 1932

After their marriage, Holman stayed with Reynolds for a month at Reynolda, the family estate of R. J. Reynolds that was built in 1917. During the 1980s Reynolda House oral history project, Nadeina Gibson Buchanan (daughter of the estate's electrician Robert L. Gibson) recalled that the staff liked Libby, who would take the trouble to "actually go down to the kitchen [at the basement level] and tell Mattie [the cook], 'Oh, that was such a good meal. I appreciate that.'" Some of Holman's friends came to visit during this period, including Clifton Webb, Spring Byington, and Beatrice Lillie.

On the night of July 5, 1932, at Reynolda, Reynolds and Holman threw a 21st birthday party for Smith's childhood friend Charles Gideon Hill Jr. In the early morning hours of July 6, with only Reynolds's friend and secretary Albert "Ab" Bailey Walker and Holman's friend, actress Blanche Yurka, remaining in the house along with Holman and Reynolds, Reynolds died of a gunshot wound to the head. As many of the party's attendees had been drunk, witness statements about the event were conflicting and muddled. Holman said she was unable to remember much of the night or the following day; the numerous testimonies given by Walker in the inquest contradicted each other. Authorities ruled the shooting a suicide, but a coroner's inquiry ruled it murder.

The death was front-page news, and the local sheriff leaked details to the press, inciting more speculation. Carpenter paid Holman's $25,000 bail at the Rockingham County Courthouse in Wentworth, North Carolina. Holman wore a heavy veil and dark dress, and bystanders and reporters thought she was black or of mixed race—a common misconception because of her olive skin tone. Holman left for Cincinnati to seek the help of her father, who was a lawyer. Fearing further scandal, the Reynolds family contacted the local authorities and had the charges dropped. On January 10, 1933, Holman gave birth to Christopher Smith "Topper" Reynolds.

The trauma of Reynolds' death followed Holman until the end of her life. She died by suicide on June 18, 1971. A friend and former lover Ned Rorem recorded in his diary on June 22:

Libby Holman has killed herself. Somehow, this doesn't come as a surprise. For, if Libby was the richest woman in the world (becoming richer as the men in her life died off), and also celebrated and honored with special friendships, the specter of violence tracked her from the start. (She once said: You want to know the truth? The night Smith Reynolds died, I was so drunk I can't remember what happened!)

That Holman was unable to remember what happened is repeated by biographer Jon Bradshaw's work. Bradshaw relates from interviews with still-living close friends that Holman called them on the telephone in a panic: "She told Louisa [Carpenter] that the Reynolds family were being horrible to her, almost as though they suspected that she had something to do with Smith's demise. But unfortunately, Libby could not remember anything. 'I was so drunk last night,' she said, 'I don't know whether I shot him or not.'"

Journalist Milt Machlin investigated the death of Reynolds and argued that he committed suicide. In his account, Holman was a victim of the anti-Semitism of local authorities. The district attorney involved with the case later told Machlin that she was innocent, and he thought that if the case had gone to trial, there might have been violence similar to the Leo Frank case.

The 1933 film Sing, Sinner, Sing was loosely based on the allegations surrounding Reynolds' death, as were the films Reckless and Written on the Wind.

In the years immediately following the death of Reynolds, the settlement of his estate became a national news story, with Holman, her newborn son Christopher Reynolds, Smith Reynolds' first wife, Anne Ludlow Cannon, and Reynolds' first child, Anne Cannon Forsyth in the news headlines. Time magazine noted that Holman entered her marriage with considerable wealth for the time, having "rapidly acquired fame and a fortune estimated at $150,000 by singing 'torch songs'" ($2.89 million in 2025). Her wealth, however, was not on the scale of her husband's, who was receiving $50,000 a year as an allowance ($963,645 in 2025), and was to receive his full inheritance of approximately $20 million ($463 million in 2025) on his 28th birthday, in 1939 (that figure, reported by Time in 1933, was smaller than the $24 million final size of the estate as reported by the New York Times in late 1934). When the final settlement arrived on March 13, 1935, Holman received $750,000 ($17.6 million in 2025) from the Reynolds estate, and Christopher Reynolds inherited $6.25 million ($147 million in 2025), which passed to Holman when Christopher died at 17 in 1950. The New York Times also reported that Reynolds' daughter Anne Cannon Forsyth was to receive "37½ per cent of the estate, or about $9,000,000" ($173 million in 2025).

== Later years ==
Holman returned briefly to the theater following the death of Reynolds. Deciding to pursue non-musical roles for the first time, she studied acting with Jasper Deeter in Pennsylvania and in 1934 performed in a comedy at the Hedgerow Theatre near Philadelpia, and then in 1935 appeared in three dramatic roles at the Ogunquit Playhouse, a summer stock theater in Maine. In between these non-singing performances, Holman returned to Broadway and appeared in the first book musical by Arthur Schwartz and Howard Dietz, Revenge with Music. In this musical, Holman debuted the standard You and the Night and the Music along with her duet partner Georges Metaxa. In 1938, Holman again appeared on Broadway in Cole Porter's You Never Know.

Holman lived in a Manhattan duplex during the mid-1930s, but in 1937 she bought 55 acres of forested land outside of Stamford, Connecticut and began building her estate, which she called Treetops. Holman hired architect William to design the 14-bedroom house, which was surrounded by features including a red-clay tennis court, two greenhouses, an oval swimming pool, a four car garage, kennels, a gas pump, and a treehouse for her son Christopher. Holman and Christopher moved into the house in the early autumn of 1938, around the time of the September 21 opening of You Never Know. Holman lived in the house the rest of her life and bought properties adjacent to her land whenever the opportunity to do so arose. At the time of her death, Treetops was an estate of 111 acres.

In March 1939, Holman married Ralph (pronounced "Rafe") Holmes, a film and stage actor, after having an intense affair with his older brother, Phillips Holmes, that included a secret abortion that she did not reveal to Phillips. In 1940, both brothers, who were half-Canadian, joined the Royal Canadian Air Force. Phillips Holmes was killed in a collision of two military aircraft on August 12, 1942. When Ralph Holmes returned home in August 1945, the marriage soured and they separated. On November 15, 1945, Ralph Holmes was found dead in his Manhattan apartment from a barbiturate overdose at age 29.

During World War II, she tried to organize shows for servicemen with her accompanist, the African-American guitarist and singer Josh White, but they were turned down on the grounds that "we don't book mixed company."

Libby and Josh were beyond brave, although perhaps she did not quite realize what she was taking on in the 1940s America. When they started rehearsals for their first show in a New York club, she arrived at the front door and was welcomed. Josh was directed to the staff entrance around the back. Libby waited till the day they were due to open, after the owners had spent a vast amount on publicity, and told them she was not going to sing in their club until they changed their racial door policy. She won. In Philadelphia, Josh was refused a room at the hotel in whose bar they sang nightly. Libby ranted and told them: "Take down the American flag outside and fly the fucking swastika, why don't you!" When they were told by officials that the U.S. Army did not tolerate mixed shows, Libby replied: "Mixed? You mean boys and girls?"

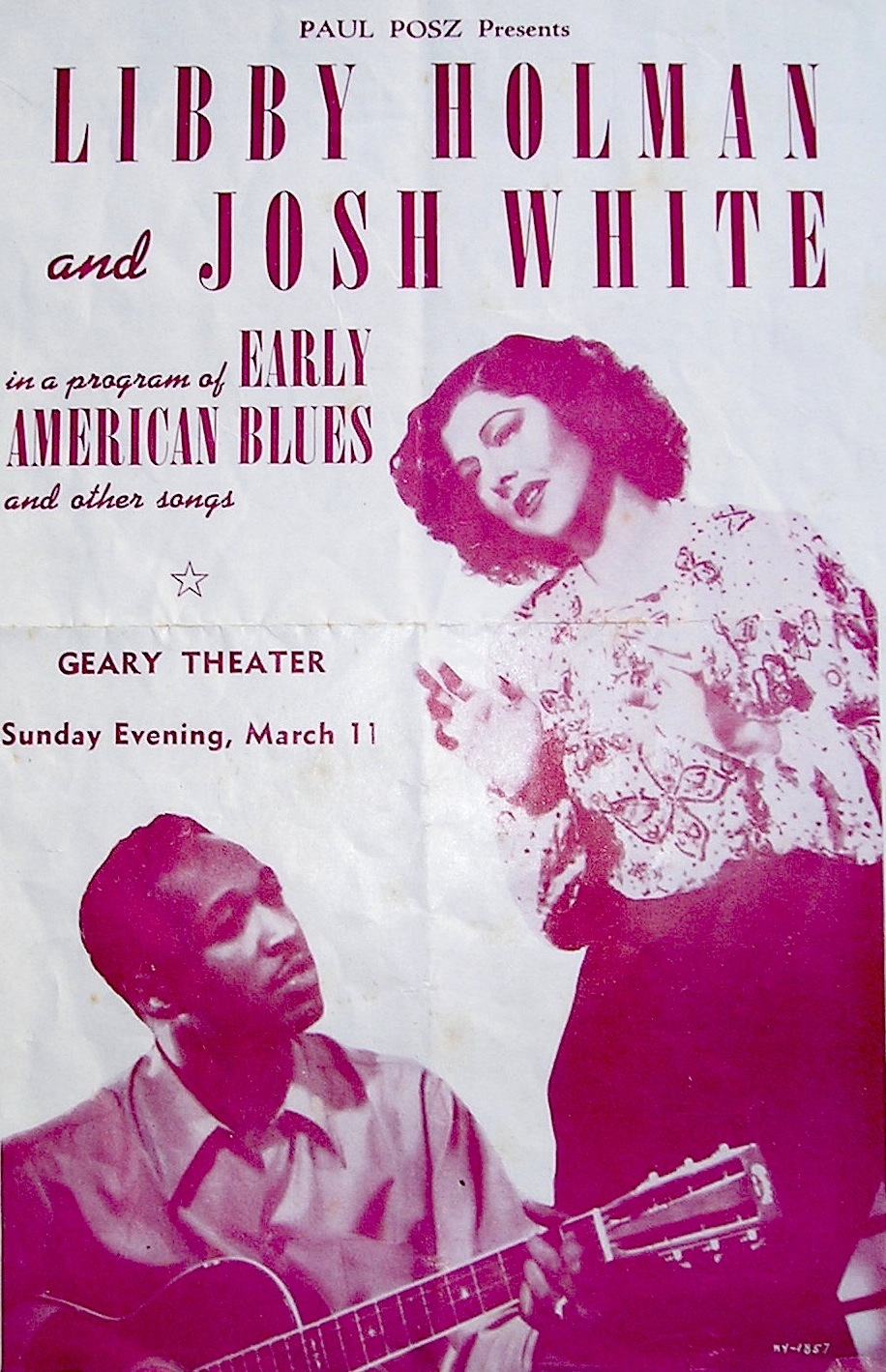
Holman and Josh White in a program of early American blues and other songs

Holman and White performed together in the U.S. intermittently between 1942 and 1945, until disagreements between the two while on the road in California caused Holman to cancel the tour mid-way and return home to her Treetops estate.

In 1944, Holman decided to expand her family, and took in two foster children, a 15-month old named Bobby, and a 4-year-old named Douglas through New York's Children's Aid Society. Both children were multiracial, and the officials at the Children's Aid Society refused to let Holman permanently adopt the boys on the grounds that they should be placed with families that matched what was at the time their perceived racial identity (East Asian). According to biographer Jon Bradshaw, Holman was devastated by the removal of her foster sons, but determined to try again.

Holman successfully adopted two sons, Timmy (born October 18, 1945), and Tony (born May 19, 1947). Her biological son Christopher ("Topper") died on August 7, 1950, after falling while mountain climbing. She had given him permission to go mountain climbing with a friend on Mount Whitney, the highest peak in California, but was unaware that the boys were ill-prepared for the adventure. Both died. Those close to Holman claim she never forgave herself.

After the death of her son Christopher, Holman travelled to France with her two younger sons and Gerald Cook, her staff pianist, and rented the Château de Bellevue, a 19th century country manor house built on the estate of the Château de Voisins, about 8 kilometres north of Versailles. Holman's family stayed at Bellevue for 10 months, during which time her son Timmy stopped talking and remained mute for the following two years. Adding to Holman's burdens during this time, the Reynolds family filed a lawsuit for the return of Christopher's inheritance, which had been worth $6,250,000 ($147 million in 2025) when it passed to Christopher in 1935. Connecticut state law stated that monies left in trusts for deceased minors reverted to the surviving parent or parents, and thus the Reynolds family lost the suit and Holman retained the inheritance.

In the early 1950s, Holman created the Christopher Reynolds Foundation to support equality, international disarmament, and the resolution of environmental problems. Over time, the foundation narrowed its scope to more specific causes, such as relations between Cuba and the U.S. She contributed to the defense of Benjamin Spock, the pediatrician and writer arrested for taking part in antiwar demonstrations.

Holman was involved in the civil rights movement in the 1950s and became a close friend and associate of Martin Luther King Jr. Through her foundation, she provided funds for King's trip to India with his wife Coretta Scott King to meet followers of Mahatma Gandhi, whom he referred to as "the guiding light of our technique of nonviolent social change".

Holman reconnected with actor Montgomery Clift in 1951, after having known him briefly when they were both in the 1942 experimental play Mexican Mural by Ramon Naya. Clift and Holman began an intense emotional and occasionally sexual relationship that lasted for the rest of the decade, with Clift spending weeks at a time with Holman at Treetops between film jobs and other pursuits. Holman also had a long and intense emotional relationship during the 1950s with Jane Bowles, similar to her relationship with Louisa Carpenter.

On December 27, 1960, Holman married visual artist and fellow activist Louis Schanker. Schanker disliked most of the men that Holman was close friends with, and thus her relationship with Clift was mostly ended by her last marriage. "Thereafter, Libby's other friends were banished one by one--David Holman, Paul Godkin, Oliver Smith, George Lloyd, and Ned Rorem", wrote biographer Jon Bradshaw.

=== Death and legacy ===
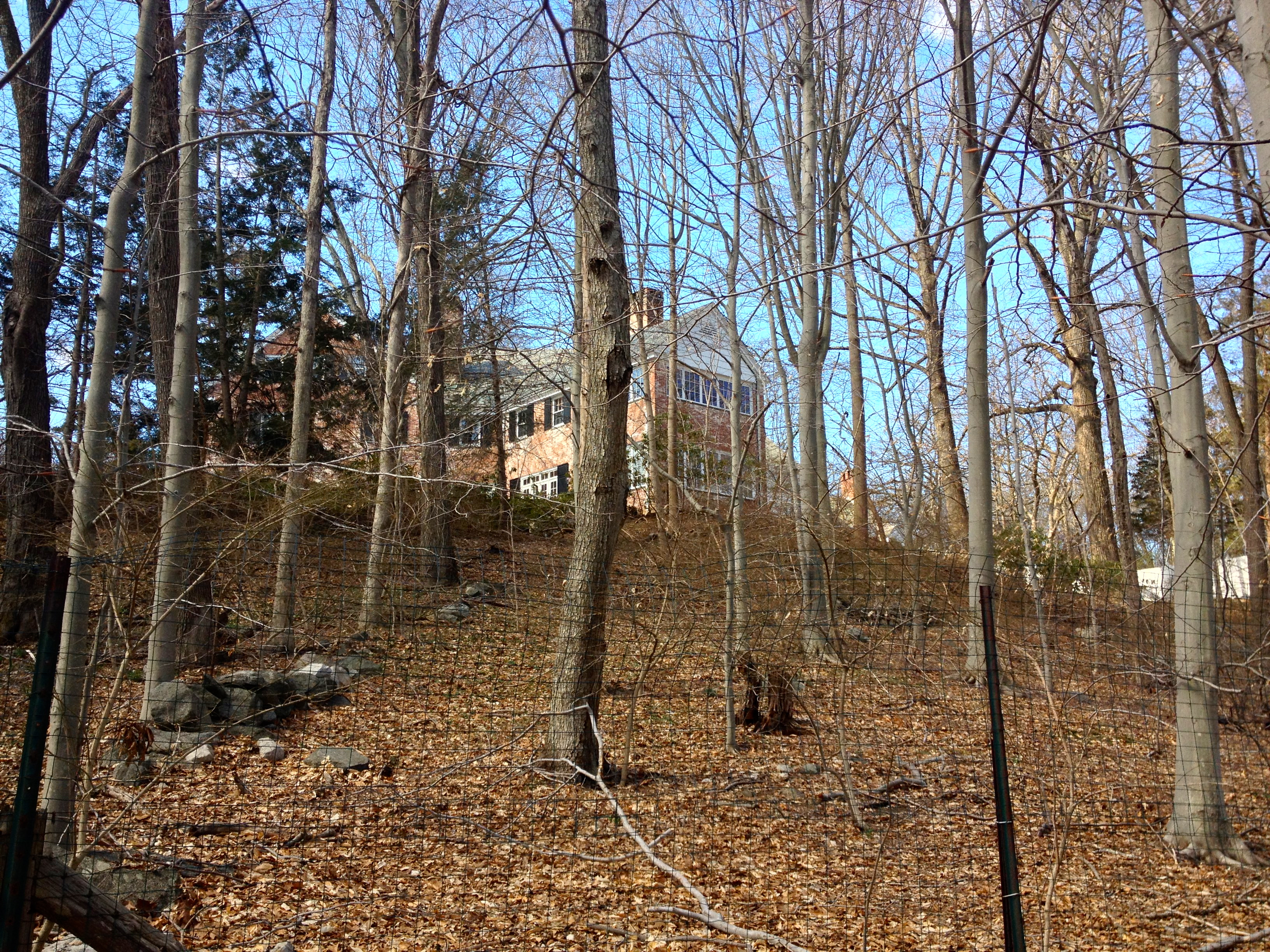
The Treetops Mansion viewed from Treetops State Park

Holman reportedly suffered from depression following the deaths of John F. Kennedy and Martin Luther King Jr., the presidential election loss by Eugene McCarthy, the deaths of young men in the Vietnam War, the death of her son, and the illness of Jane Bowles. Friends said she lost her vitality after the death of her close friend Montgomery Clift in 1966. The deaths of multiple people close to her, combined with the Vietnam War and the turbulent political situation, took a toll on her mental health.

On June 18, 1971, Holman was found nearly dead in the front seat of her Rolls-Royce. She was taken to the hospital where she died hours later. Her death was ruled a suicide due to carbon monoxide poisoning. In view of her bouts with depression and reported past suicide attempts, none of Holman's friends or relatives were surprised by the manner of her death. She was cremated and her ashes were scattered at Treetops.

Holman left each of her living sons $1 million ($7.95 million in 2025), and her husband $850,000 ($6.76 million in 2025). She also left money to Jane Bowles, Gerald Cook, the Zen Studies Society, and others. The bulk of her financial estate, about $10 million ($79.5 million in 2025), went to the Christopher Reynolds Foundation, which as of 2026 is still making grants, supporting "work relating to climate justice; climate resilience and adaptation; and ecosystem health and integrity in the face of unraveling global systems."

Holman's will stipulated that Treetops be given to Boston University. However, the University balked at the maintenance costs for the property and returned it to the Holman estate. In 1978, the estate offered the property to the city of Stamford for $1, but the city declined to accept the property, citing the maintenance expense as the reason for its refusal. Treetops was then sold on the commercial market and by 2000, was owned by International Paper Co., which sought to sell the entire 111 acre parcel to a land developer for a residential subdivision.

In 2001, a consortium seeking to preserve open land bought 94 acres of it for $11.5 million, saving most of the land (but not the 17 acres on which the house sat), from development. That 94 acres became part of the Mianus River State Park, overseen by the Connecticut Department of Environmental Protection. Treetops is south of the Mianus River Park. International paper found a private buyer for the mansion in 2003, and as of 2026, the structure remains a private residence. In 2006, Louis Schanker's art studio on a hill overlooking the property became the home of the Treetops Chamber Music Society.

== Filmography ==
- Dreams That Money Can Buy (1947)

== Musical theatre credits ==
- The Sapphire Ring - Selwyn Theatre (1925)
- The Garrick Gaieties - Garrick Theatre (1925)
- Greenwich Village Follies - Shubert Theatre (1926)
- Merry-Go-Round - Klaw Theatre (1927)
- Rainbow - Gallo Theatre (1928)
- Ned Wayburn's Gambols - Knickerbocker Theatre (1929)
- The Little Show - Music Box Theatre (1929)
- Three's a Crowd - Selwyn Theatre (1930)
- Revenge with Music- New Amsterdam Theatre (1934)
- You Never Know - Winter Garden Theatre (1938)
- Burlesque(1939)
- The Greeks Had a Word For It (1940)
- My Sister Eileen (1941)
- Over 21 (1945)
- Blues, Ballads, and Sin Songs (1954) - Bijou Theatre

== Hit records ==
Year	Single	US Chart
1929	"Am I Blue?"	4
1929	"Moanin' Low"	5
1929	"Find Me a Primitive Man"	19
1930	"Why Was I Born?"	19
1930	"Body and Soul"	3
1930	"Something to Remember You By"	6
1931	"Love for Sale"	5
1931	"I'm One of God's Children"	14
1935	"You and the Night and the Music"	11

== In pop culture ==
- The 1933 film Sing, Sinner, Sing was loosely based on the allegations surrounding Reynolds' death, as were the films Reckless and Written on the Wind.
- The song "Broken Bracelets" by Marc Almond is about Holman, referencing her suicide, "Moanin' Low," and the violence in her relationship with Reynolds. Almond also featured Holman in a retrospective of his favorite torch singers, calling her "perhaps the first bona fide torch singer."
