= Treetops (state park) =

Former estate of singer and actress Libby Holman

Mianus River State Park
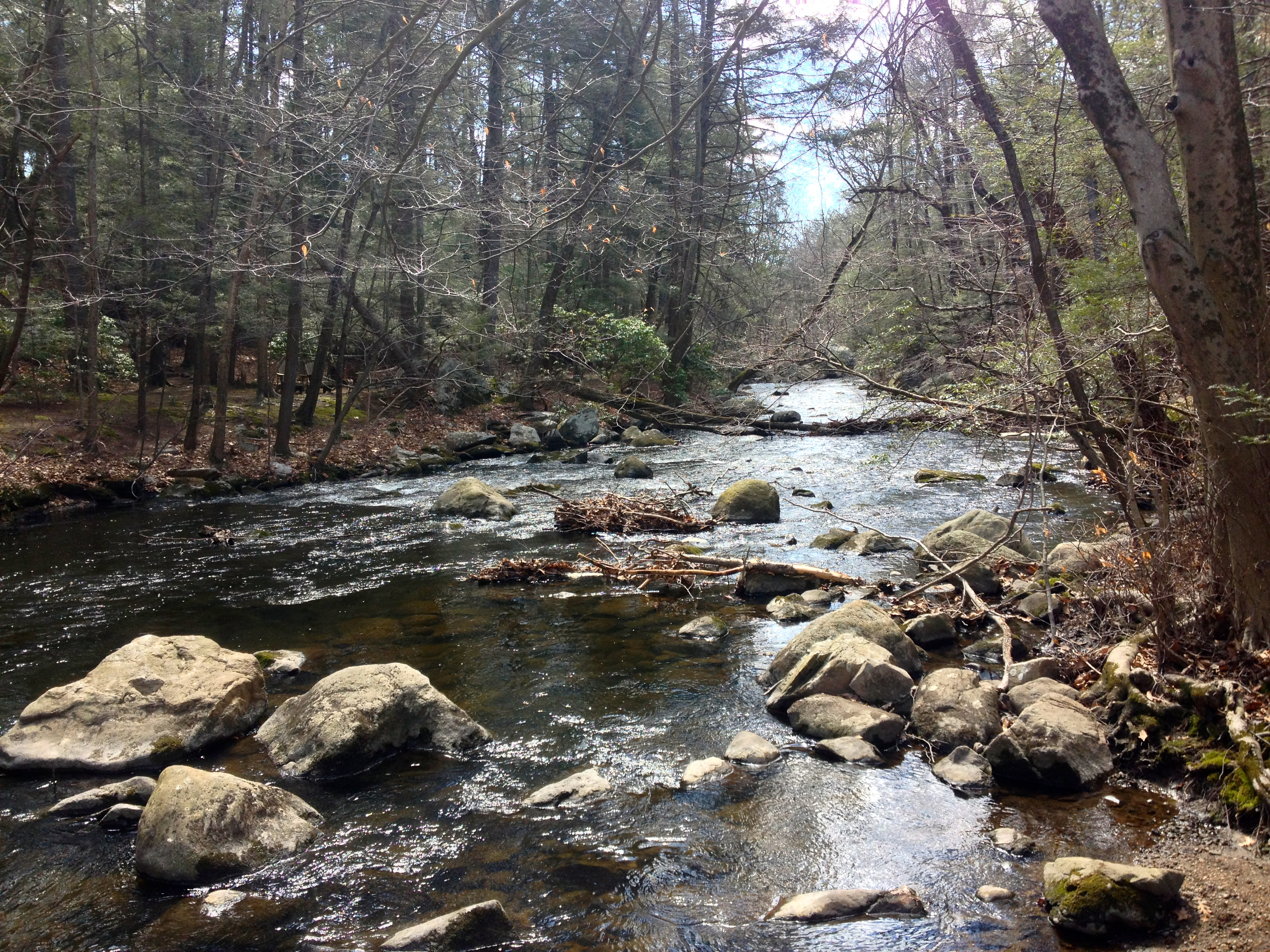
- Mianus River

- Location within Connecticut
- Location: Stamford and Greenwich, Connecticut, United States
- Coordinates: 41°04′47″N 73°34′54″W
- Area: 527 acres (213 ha)
- Established: 2001
- Administrator: Connecticut Department of Energy and Environmental Protection
- Designation: Connecticut state park
- Website: Official website

Treetops is the former estate of torch singer and actress Libby Holman. In 2001, a successful effort was made by local citizens to save the estate from development. As a result, 94 acres of pristine grounds were preserved as a state park, with a further 11 acres around the Treetops mansion covered by a conservation easement. Many rooms in Holman's mansion, including the studio of her third husband, abstract artist Louis Schanker, have been restored by its current owners. (Note: The Treetops Chamber Music Society inaugurated its annual concert series at the artist's former studio in 2006.)

The property forms the southernmost portion of Mianus River Park and is overseen by the Connecticut Department of Energy and Environmental Protection as Mianus River State Park.

== State park ==
Mianus River State Park, which straddles the border of Stamford and Greenwich, encompasses 527 acres and comprises Treetops (94 acres), Mianus River Park (187 acres owned by the City of Stamford), and the Mianus River and Natural Park (110 acres owned by the Town of Greenwich). Other nearby Mianus River parks include the Mianus River State Park Scenic Reserve (over 353 acres in two tracts) and the privately owned Mianus River Gorge Preserve (935 acres, open to the public from April 1 through November 30). (Note: Entrance parking for Treetops is at Merribrook Lane in Stamford (41.080869°N 73.594958°W). Entrance parking for the adjacent Mianus River State Park is also at Merribrook Lane in Stamford (41.080869°N 73.594958°W). Entrance parking for the Mianus River State Park Scenic Reserve is at Farms Road (41°07′22.2″N 73°37′02.1″W). Entrance parking for the Mianus River and Natural Park is at Cognewaugh Road in Greenwich (41.080869°N 73.594958°W). Entrance parking for the Mianus River Gorge Preserve is at 167 Mianus River Road in Bedford (41.185206°N 73.621739°W).)
