= Mianus River =

River in New York and Connecticut in the United States of America

Coordinates: 41.039°N 73.590°W

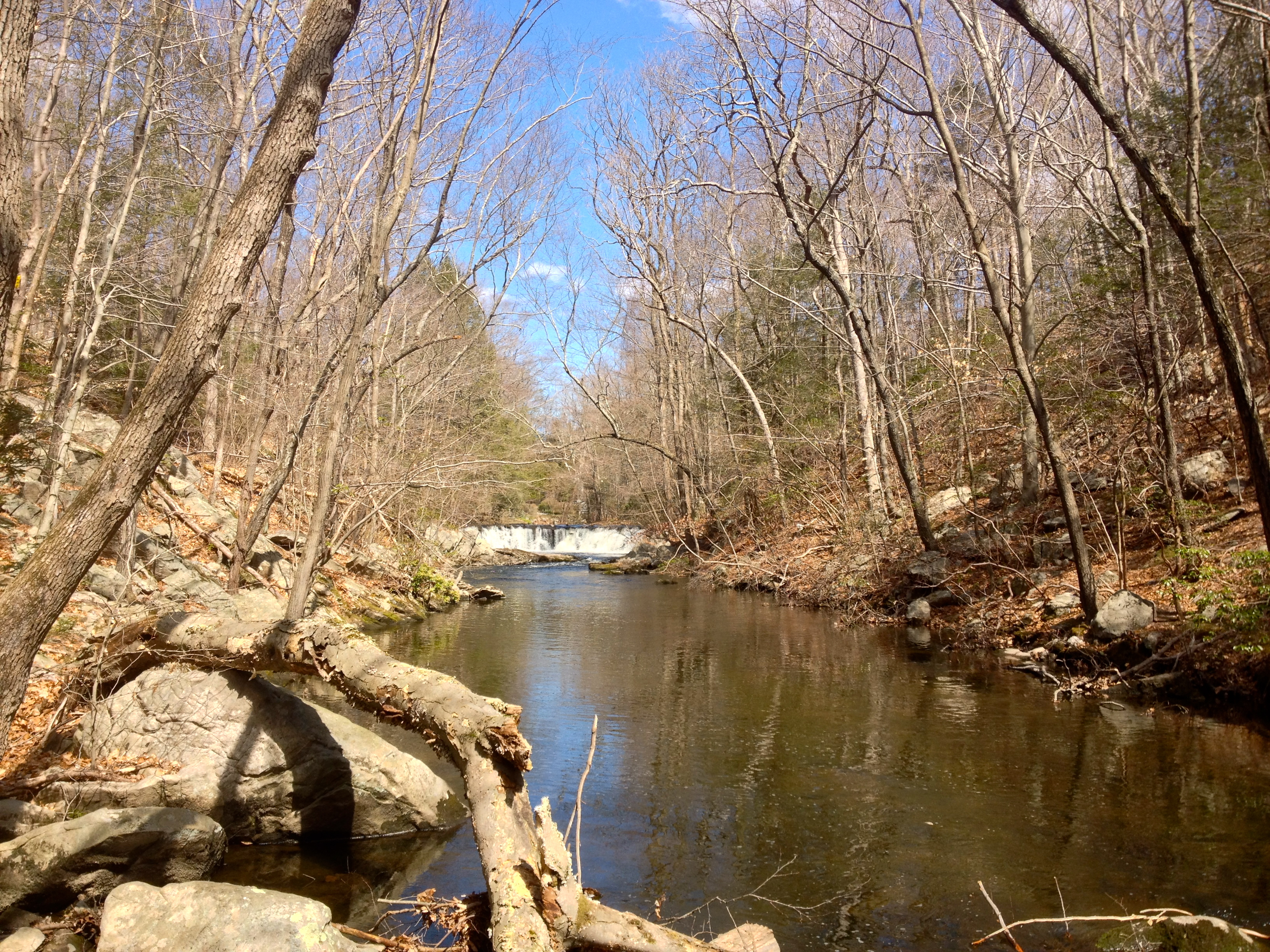
- Low dam upriver on Mianus River in Mianus River Park near Old Mill Lane in Stamford, Connecticut.

- Location of the mouth in Connecticut

Location
- Country: United States
- States: New York and Connecticut

Physical characteristics
- Source
  - location: Town of North Castle, New York
- Mouth
  - location: Long Island Sound, Connecticut
  - elevation: Sea level
- Length: 20.3 m (67 ft)

The Mianus River is a 20.3-mile-long (32.7 km) river in Westchester County, New York, and Fairfield County, Connecticut, in the United States. It begins in the town of North Castle, New York (east of Armonk) in a series of ponds at about 600 feet (180 m) altitude. Flowing northeast into the town of Bedford, it abruptly turns south and passes through the Mianus River Gorge, a nature preserve, before entering Stamford, Connecticut, where it is dammed into the Mianus Reservoir, officially known as the Samuel J. Bargh Reservoir (256-foot (78 m) altitude) of the Greenwich Water Company. From there, it flows south through Stamford and Greenwich into Long Island Sound, at sea level.

The river flows under the Mianus River Bridge, which is part of Interstate 95, U.S. Route 1, and the Mianus River Railroad Bridge which carries the New Haven Line of Metro-North Railroad. The Mianus flows through parks including the Mianus River State Park (straddling the Stamford/Greenwich border) and Mianus Glen, just to the north in Stamford, as well as Newman Mills Park in North Stamford.

The Mianus Fault runs near the river, pushing rock on the east side down, relative to the west side.

Mianus is a corruption of Mayanno, an Indian chieftain. Mianus has frequently been noted on lists of unusual place names.

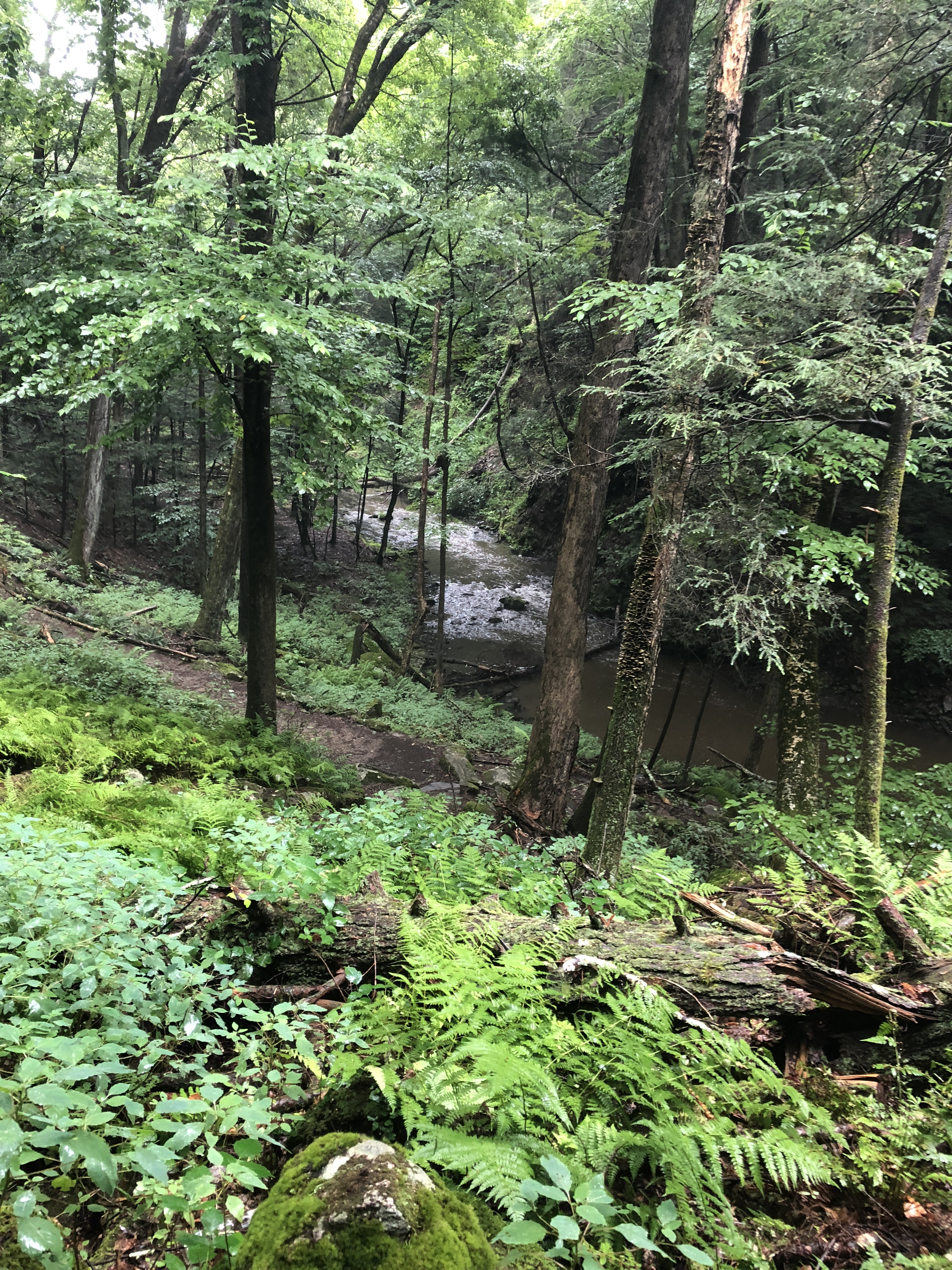
Mianus river in the Mianus River Gorge Preserve in Bedford, New York.

== See also ==
- List of rivers of Connecticut
- List of rivers of New York
- Mianus River Gorge
