= Arthur Bowditch =

American architect (1870–1941)

Arthur H. Bowditch
- Born: May 12, 1870; Boston, Massachusetts, United States
- Died: May 13, 1941 (aged 71); Brookline, Massachusetts, United States
- Occupation: Architect

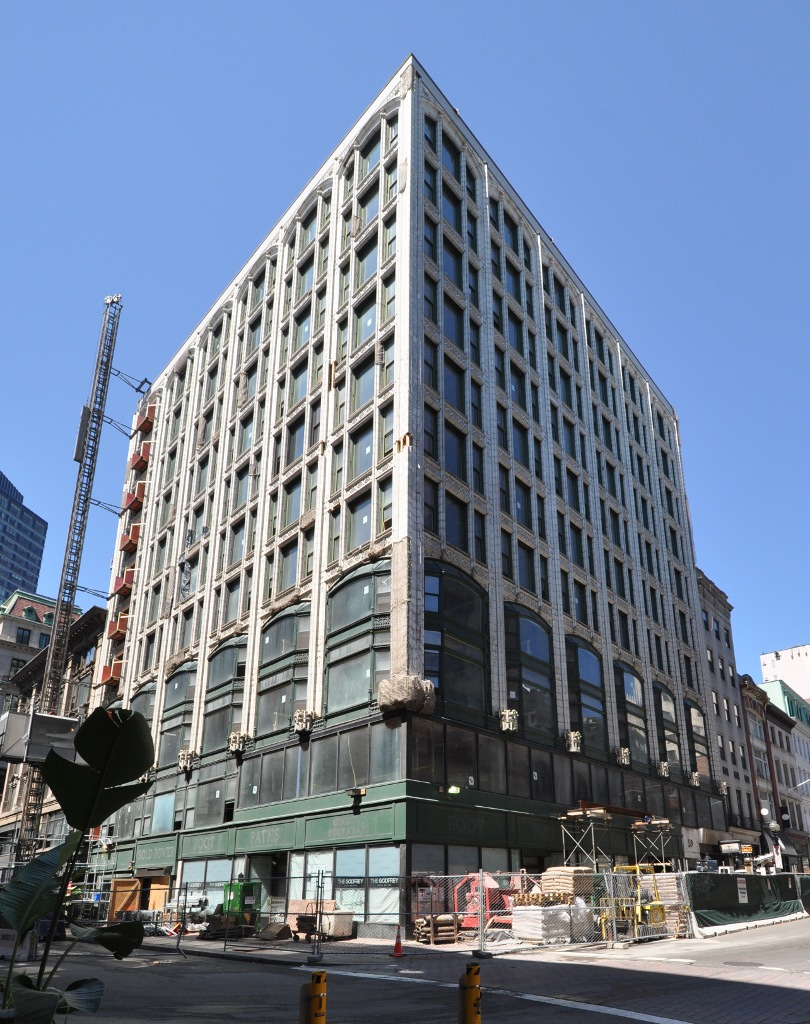
The Blake Building, designed by Bowditch in the Gothic Revival style and completed in 1908

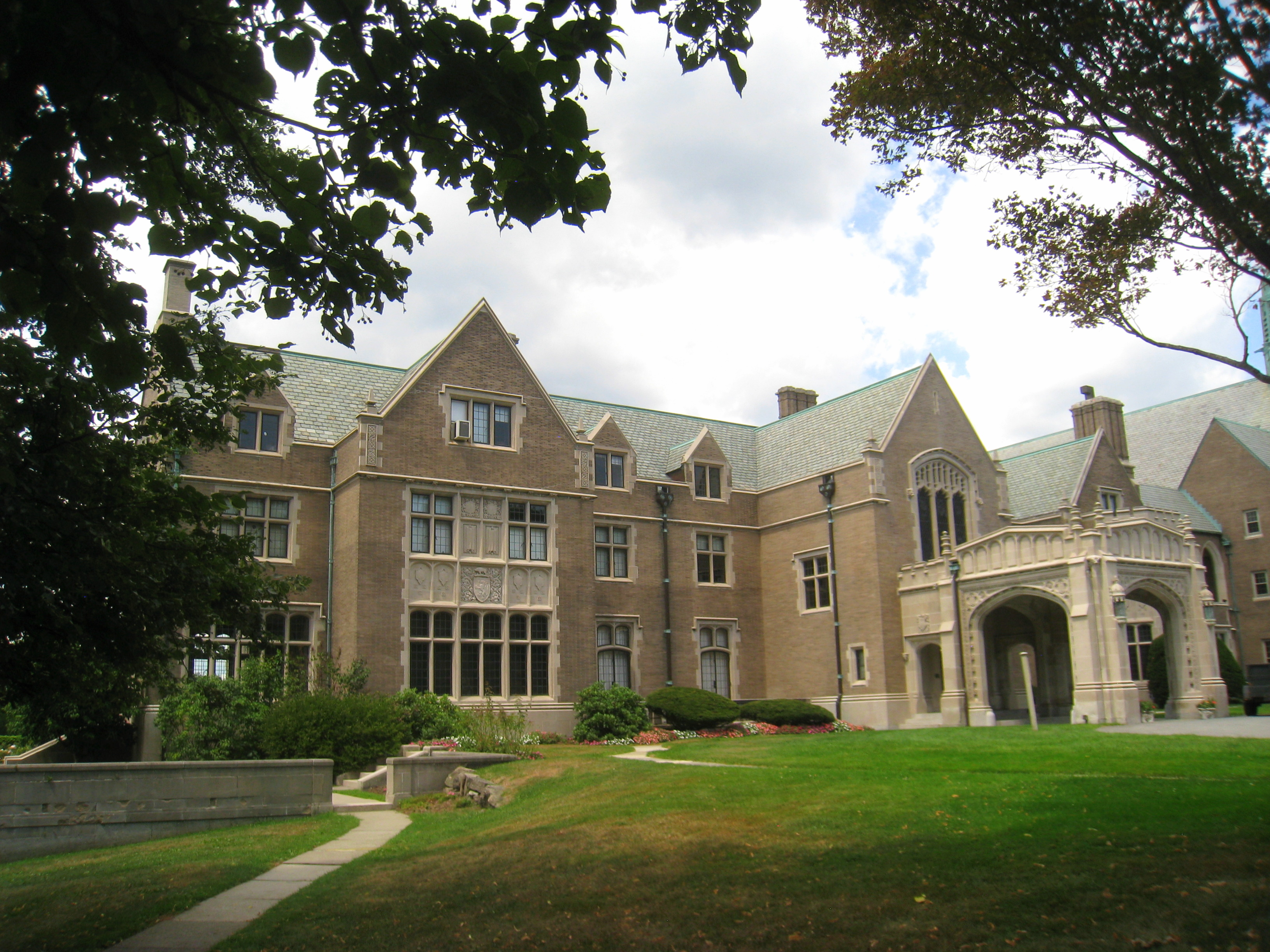
The Loren Towle Estate in Newton, designed by Bowditch in the Jacobethan style and completed in 1923

Arthur H. Bowditch (May 12, 1870 – May 13, 1941) was an architect in practice in Boston during the late 19th and early 20th centuries.

== Life and career ==
Arthur Hunnewell Bowditch was born May 12, 1870, in Boston to Charles A. Bowditch and Emma F. Bowditch, née Hunnewell. After working as a drafter for several Boston architects he established a practice of his own c. 1893. From c. 1903 to c. 1907 he worked in partnership with Edward B. Stratton under the name Bowditch & Stratton, but otherwise practiced independently.

Bowditch was successful as an architect of large buildings, especially office buildings, apartment buildings and hotels. His largest office building is the Old South Building (1903), an elaborate Neoclassical building adjacent to the Old South Meeting House. Others include the Vermont Building (1904, NRHP-listed), with Stratton, the Blake Building (1908, NRHP-listed), the Publicity Building (1916, NRHP-listed) and the Transit Building (1919). His most distinctive apartment building is The Stoneholm (1907) in Brookline, completed with Stratton. Architectural historian Douglass Shand-Tucci described it as "the most magnificent building of its type in Greater Boston–a splendid Baroque extravanganza that holds the high ground...with great distinction." Hotels included the Hotel Essex (1899), now the Plymouth Rock Building, the Lenox Hotel (1900) and the former Fritz-Carlton Hotel (1903), now the main building of the Berklee College of Music. He also designed apartment hotels, including The Somerset (1899) and the former Myles Standish Hotel (1926), now a Boston University dormitory. Among his latest works was the Paramount Theatre (1932), the last movie palace built in Boston and a rare example of Art Deco architecture in his portfolio.

Bowditch was not known as an architect of homes, though he designed a few. Smaller examples are the House at 12–16 Corey Road (1896, NRHP-listed) in Brookline and the Mayall Bruner House (1923, NRHP-listed) in Newton. The largest was the Loren Towle Estate (1923, NRHP-listed) in Newton, a Jacobethan mansion built for the developer of the Publicity Building. Towle died shortly before construction was completed and the house is now occupied, with additions, by the Newton Country Day School.

Bowditch worked primarily but not exclusively in Greater Boston. Works elsewhere include the Elton Hotel (1905), with Stratton in association with Griggs & Hunt, in Waterbury, Connecticut, the Woolworth Building (1921) in Providence, Rhode Island, the former Towle High School (1925) in Newport and the Pleasant View Home (1927, NRHP-listed) in Concord, New Hampshire.

Bowditch, like many of his contemporaries, was stylistically eclectic, selecting revival styles for his buildings according to his or his clients' wants. Only late in his career, in designing the Paramount Theatre, did he consider a more modern style such as Art Deco.

== Personal life ==
In 1893 Bowditch was married to Alice DeWitt Foster. He died May 13, 1941, in Brookline, at the age of 71.
