= Edward B. Stratton =

American architect (1870–1953)

- Born: March 21, 1870; Chelsea, Massachusetts, United States
- Died: June 1, 1953 (aged 83); Marblehead, Massachusetts, United States
- Occupation: Architect

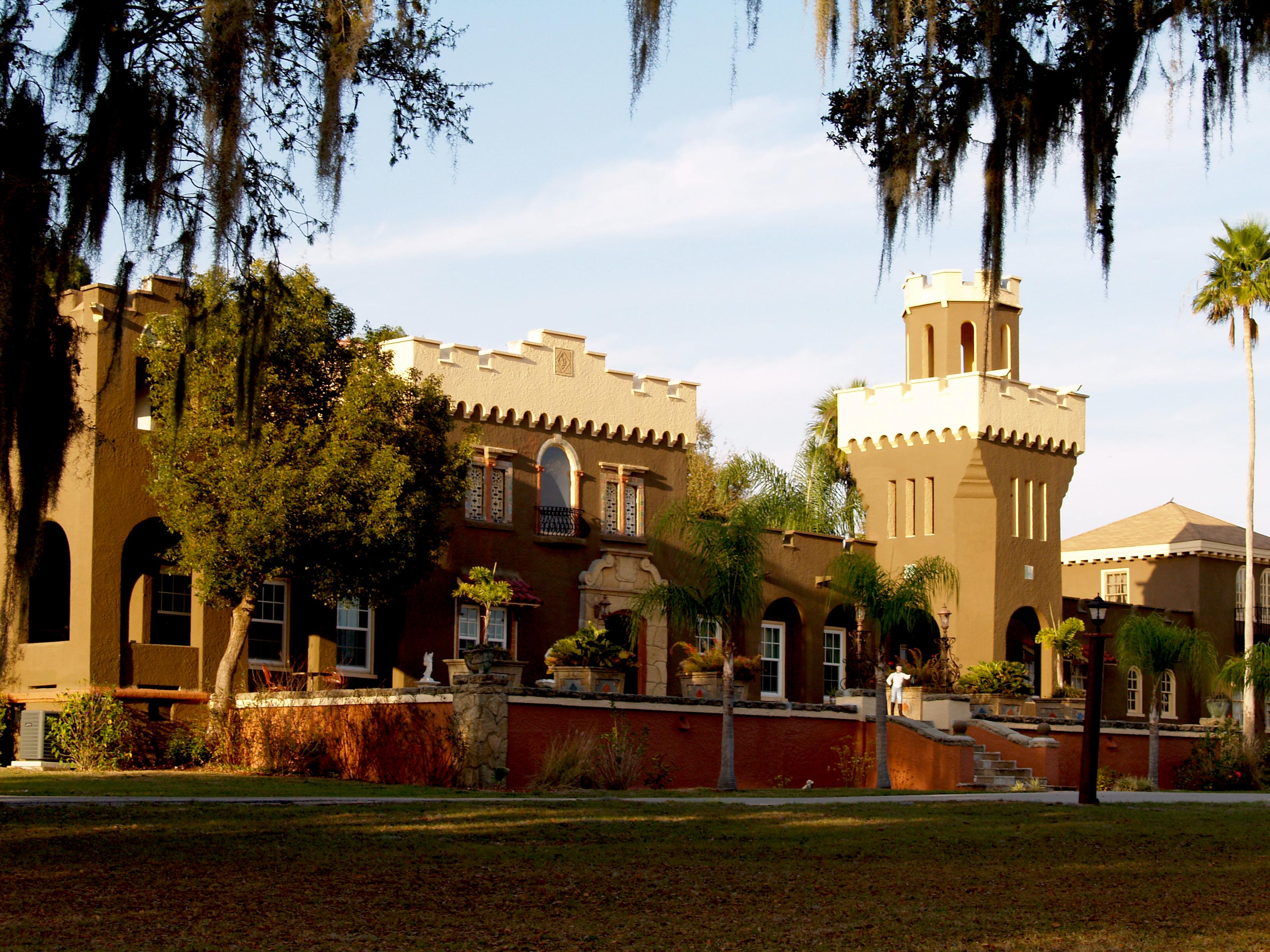
Casa De Josefina near Lake Wales, Florida, designed by Stratton in the Mediterranean Revival style and completed in 1923

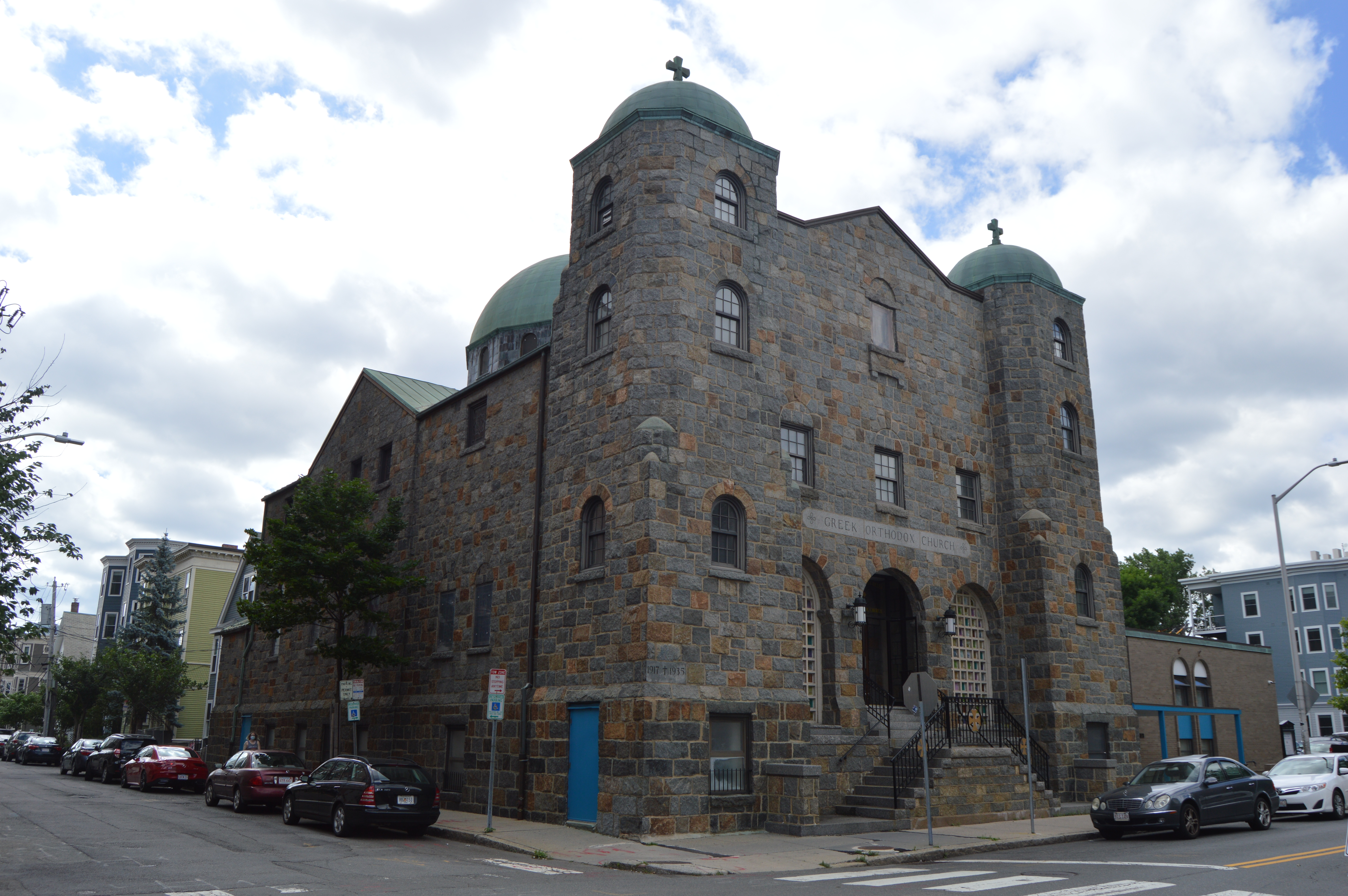
The Ss. Constantine and Helen Greek Orthodox Church in Cambridge, designed by Stratton in the Neo-Byzantine style and completed in 1935

Edward B. Stratton (March 21, 1870 – June 1, 1953) was an American architect in practice in Boston during the early 20th century. Chiefly a residential architect, Stratton designed apartment buildings and homes throughout Greater Boston.

== Life and career ==
Edward Bowman Stratton was born March 21, 1870, in Chelsea, Massachusetts, to William A. Stratton and Ellen M. Stratton, née Paine. He worked as a drafter for several Boston architects, spending the longest amount of time with J. Williams Beal. He was a member of the Boston Architectural Club (BAC) and took advantage of the club's night classes in architecture and design. In 1897 he was the inaugural, and possibly only, recipient of a BAC traveling scholarship which enabled him to spend a year studying abroad. He began practice c. 1900 as a partner of Frederic P. Simonds in the firm of Stratton & Simonds. Then, c. 1903, he joined Arthur Bowditch to form Bowditch & Stratton. This lasted until c. 1907, after which Stratton practiced independently for the rest of his career.

With Bowditch, Stratton was involved in the design of the Vermont Building (1904, NRHP-listed) and the Stoneholm (1907), "a splendid Baroque extravanganza" of an apartment building in Brookline. As an independent practitioner, he was primarily a residential architect. In Boston proper he designed apartment buildings and apartment hotels, including the Hotel Puritan (1909) and the Charlesview (1924) in the Back Bay. Across the river in Cambridge he designed the Ss. Constantine and Helen Greek Orthodox Church (1935) in the Neo-Byzantine style often used for Orthodox churches.

In the Boston suburbs Stratton was a prolific architect of single-family homes, including his own home (1912, NRHP-listed) in Newton. He also designed the former West Newton branch of the Newton Free Library (1926), now used as an annex by the Newton Police Department, and the Woman's Club of Newton Highlands (1927), eclectic buildings in the Tudor and Spanish Colonial Revival styles, respectively.

Outside of Greater Boston Stratton completed several projects in Stamford, Connecticut, including the pavilion (1922, demolished) at Cummings Park and the Gurley, now Valeur, Building (1925), a downtown office building. Further afield is Casa De Josefina (1923, NRHP-listed) near Lake Wales, Florida, which is unique in Stratton's portfolio. It is unclear how he was chosen architect as his clients, Irwin A. and Josephine Yarnell, were from Minneapolis. Casa De Josefina is an elaborate Mediterranean Revival mansion, combining elements of Italian, Spanish and Gothic architecture.

== Personal life and death ==
Stratton was married in 1903 to Bertha E. Smith. They had four children, including three sons and one daughter. He died June 1, 1953, in Marblehead at the age of 83.
