= Loren Towle Estate =

Historic house in Massachusetts, United States

- U.S. National Register of Historic Places
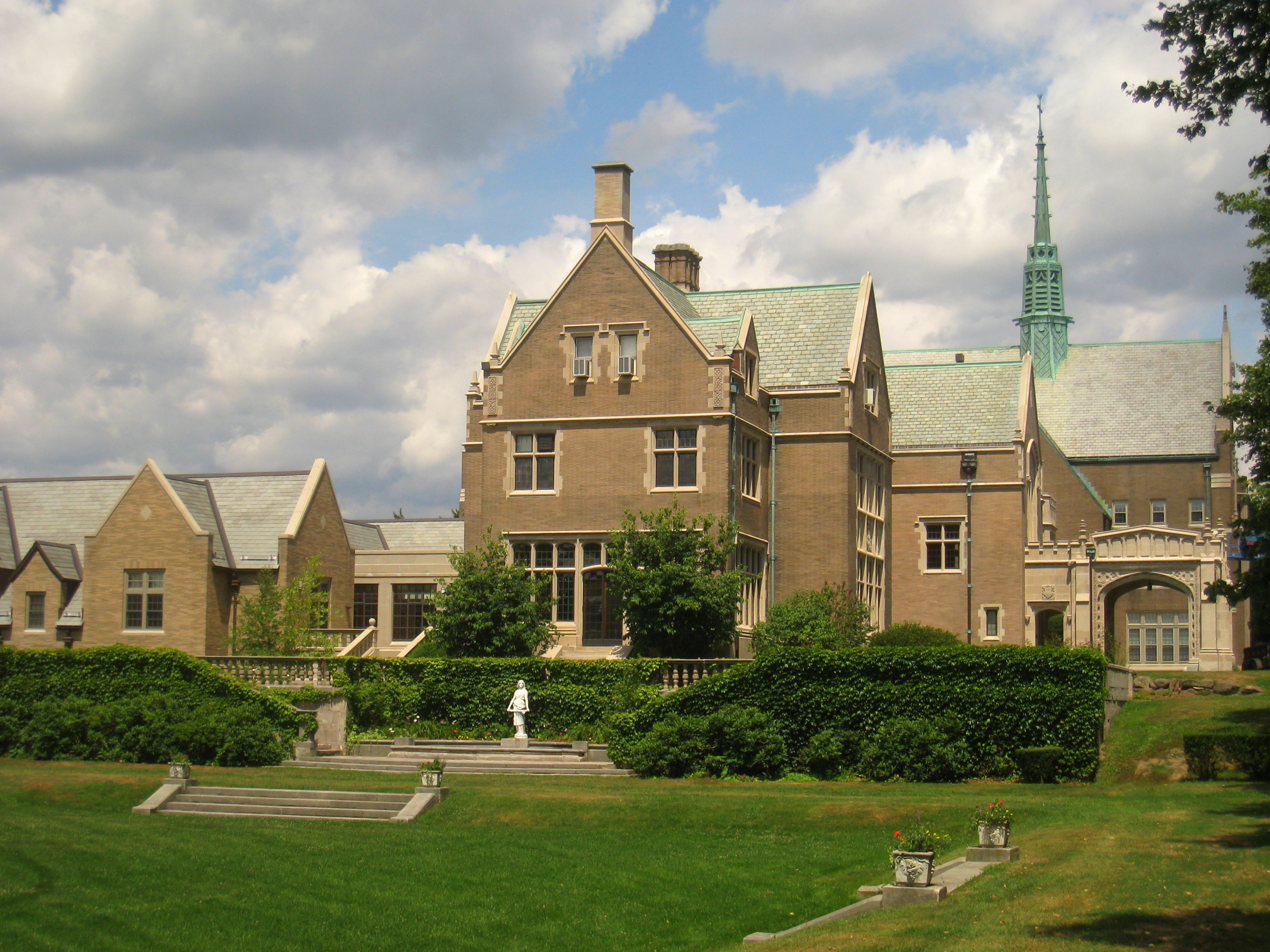

- Location within Massachusetts Location within the United States
- Location: 785 Centre St., Newton, Massachusetts
- Coordinates: 42°20′43″N 71°11′31″W
- Built: 1920
- Architect: Bowditch, Arthur W.
- Architectural style: Tudor Revival, Jacobethan Revival
- MPS: Newton MRA
- NRHP reference No.: 90000026
- Added to NRHP: February 16, 1990

The Loren Towle Estate is a historic estate at 785 Centre Street in Newton, Massachusetts, USA.

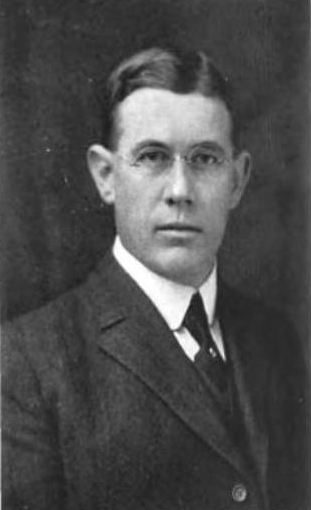
Loren D. Towle (1874–1923)

The estate's construction began in 1920 for real estate executive Loren D. Towle as a 35-room, Gothic-style English Revival mansion with formal gardens, terraces, tennis courts, and garage. Design of the estate buildings was by Arthur W. Bowditch, and landscaping design was provided by the Olmsted Brothers firm. Towle died in 1923, before the mansion was completed. In December 1925 it became home to the Newton Country Day School, and in 1990 it was added to the National Register of Historic Places.

== See also ==
- National Register of Historic Places listings in Newton, Massachusetts
