= Casa De Josefina =

Historic house in Florida, United States

- U.S. National Register of Historic Places
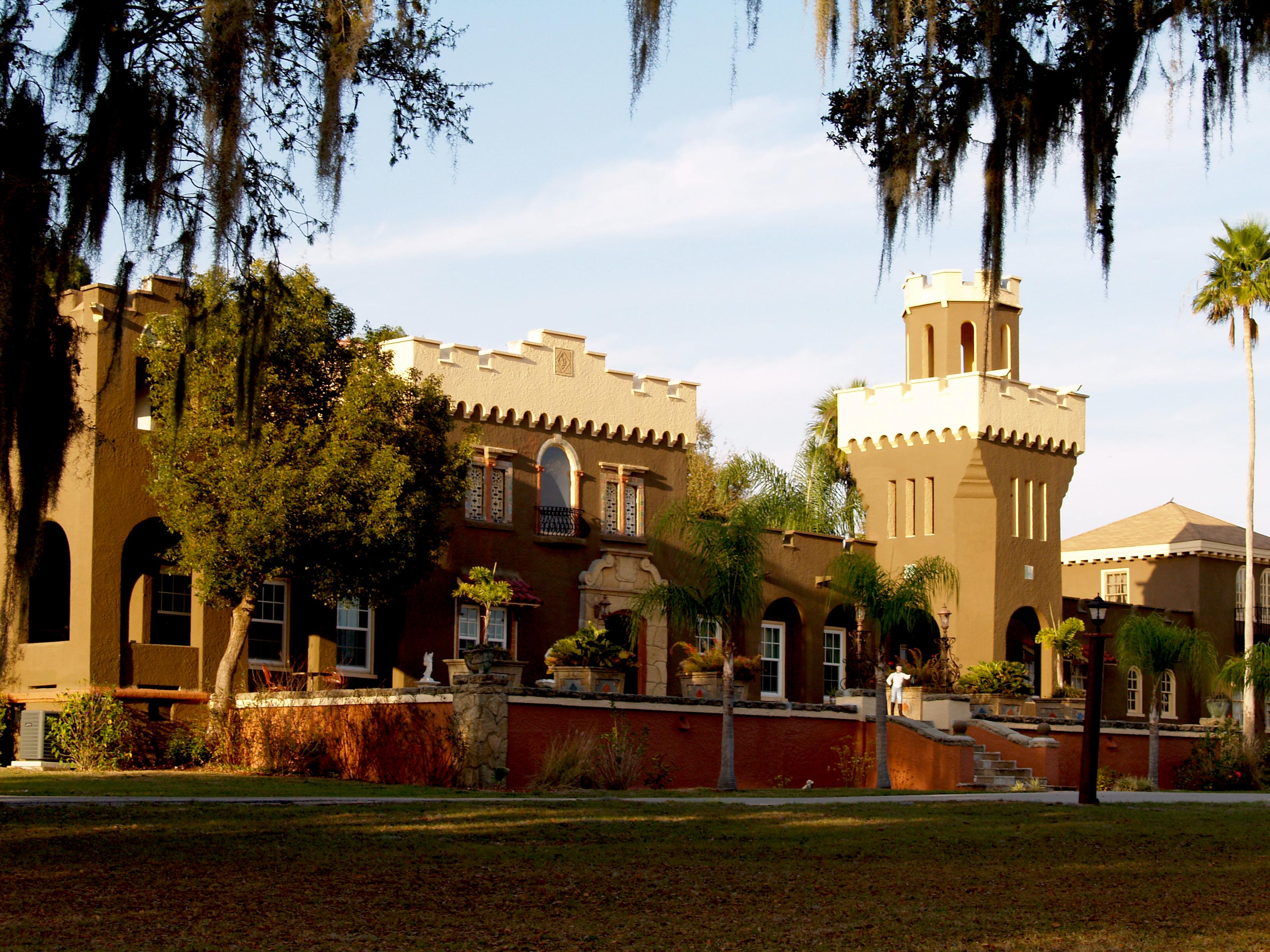

- Location within Florida Location within the United States
- Location: Lake Wales, Florida
- Coordinates: 27°51′53″N 81°34′18″W
- Built: 1923
- Architect: L.S. Acuff, Edward B. Stratton
- Architectural style: Eclectic with Italian, Spanish, Gothic, and other elements
- NRHP reference No.: 75000567
- Added to NRHP: 10 June 1975

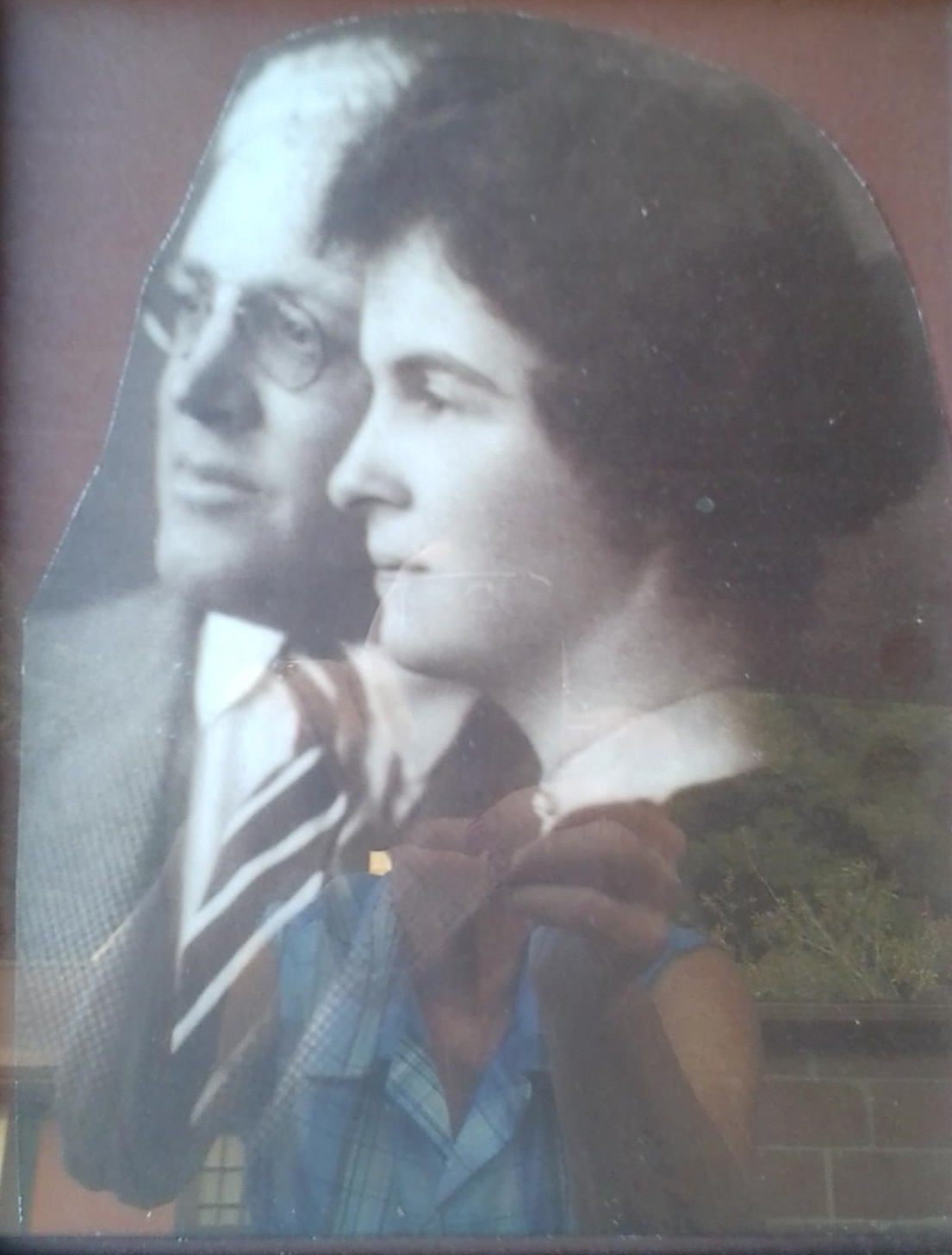
Irwin Arthur Yarnell and Josephine Yarnell

The Casa De Josefina (also known as the Irwin Arthur Yarnell House) is a historic home near Lake Wales, Florida. It is located two miles southeast of Lake Wales off U.S. 27. On June 10, 1975, it was added to the U.S. National Register of Historic Places.

== Architectural description ==
The house is built of stucco-covered coquina in an eclectic Florida Boom style, a blend of Spanish, Italian, and Gothic, and is E-shaped with a corner tower. A porch at the rear connects the rooms in the three wings. The grounds comprise 18 acres. Irwin Arthur Yarnell, a banker from Minneapolis who helped develop Florida communities including Highland Park, built it for $1.5 million in 1923 and named it for his wife, Josephine; above the front door is a stained-glass window with her name in the grillwork, and there is a sculpture of her profile on a parapet. There were originally gardens including 2,000 species of palms. The house was built by European craftsmen and furnished with antiques bought abroad, and the couple hosted lavish parties there until the Florida bust of 1926 and the stock market crash of 1929 ruined them.

== History ==
Irwin Yarnell died in 1936; Josephine Yarnell continued to live in the house until her death in 1967. She sold antiques, jewelry, and much of the land. Part of the house served at one point as the Ponce de Leon Hall for Convalescents, and it has also been a boarding house and housed a community center. It was open to the public for tours led by the Yarnell grandchildren in the 1960s. Later on, The Miami bank foreclosed on the property and requested that Jacques Gauthier and Beverly Gauthier of Cocoa, Florida purchase the property. They finished the condo developments and moved on. From 1981 it was owned by the Louwsma family, who modified it; it has sometimes been mistaken for a hotel. Contrary to local legends, Josephine Yarnell's family attests that Josephine never believed the house was haunted, but she never refuted such claims because such nonsense kept out trespassers. The family was amused when people later believed Josephine haunted the house, and one claim was her ghost was seen dusting the house, an idea her family thought creative but completely out of character for Josephine. Jean Louwsma said in the 1980s that she thought it was haunted by Josephine herself.
