= Publicity Building =

- U.S. National Register of Historic Places
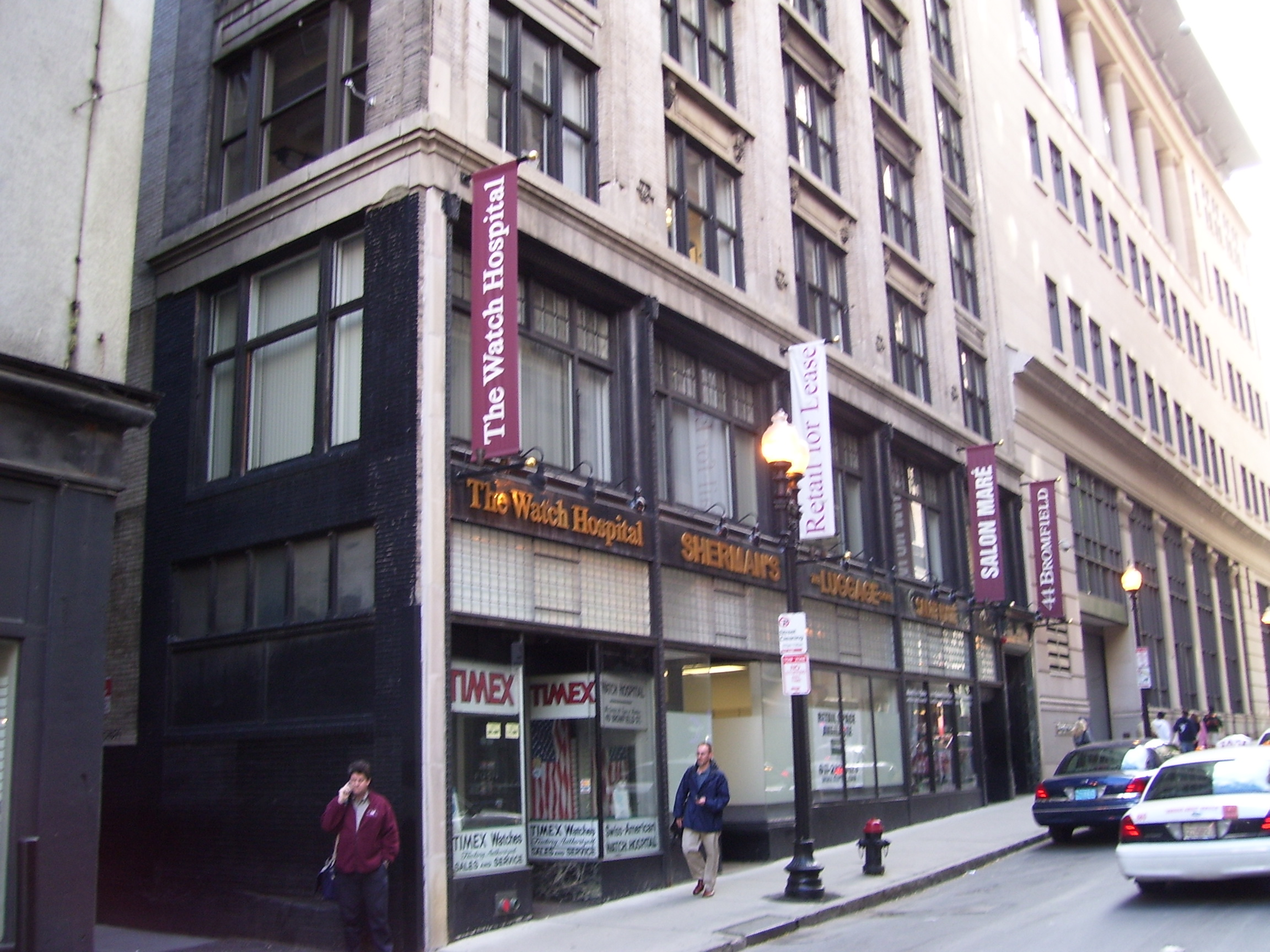

- Location within Boston Location within Massachusetts Location within the United States
- Location: 40–44 Bromfield St., Boston, Massachusetts
- Coordinates: 42°21′23″N 71°3′41″W
- Area: less than one acre
- Built: 1916
- Architect: Bowditch, Arthur H.
- NRHP reference No.: 03000781
- Added to NRHP: August 20, 2003

The Publicity Building is a historic Class-B commercial office building located at 40-44 Bromfield Street in downtown Boston, Massachusetts.

== Description and history ==
The nine-story, brick and limestone office building was designed by Arthur H. Bowditch and built in 1916. It is noted for its Beaux Arts styling and its largely intact cast-iron storefronts. Its name is supposedly derived from an early concentration of press and media-related businesses which occupied its upper floors. It underwent renovations in 1975.

The building was listed on the National Register of Historic Places on August 20, 2003.

== Gallery ==
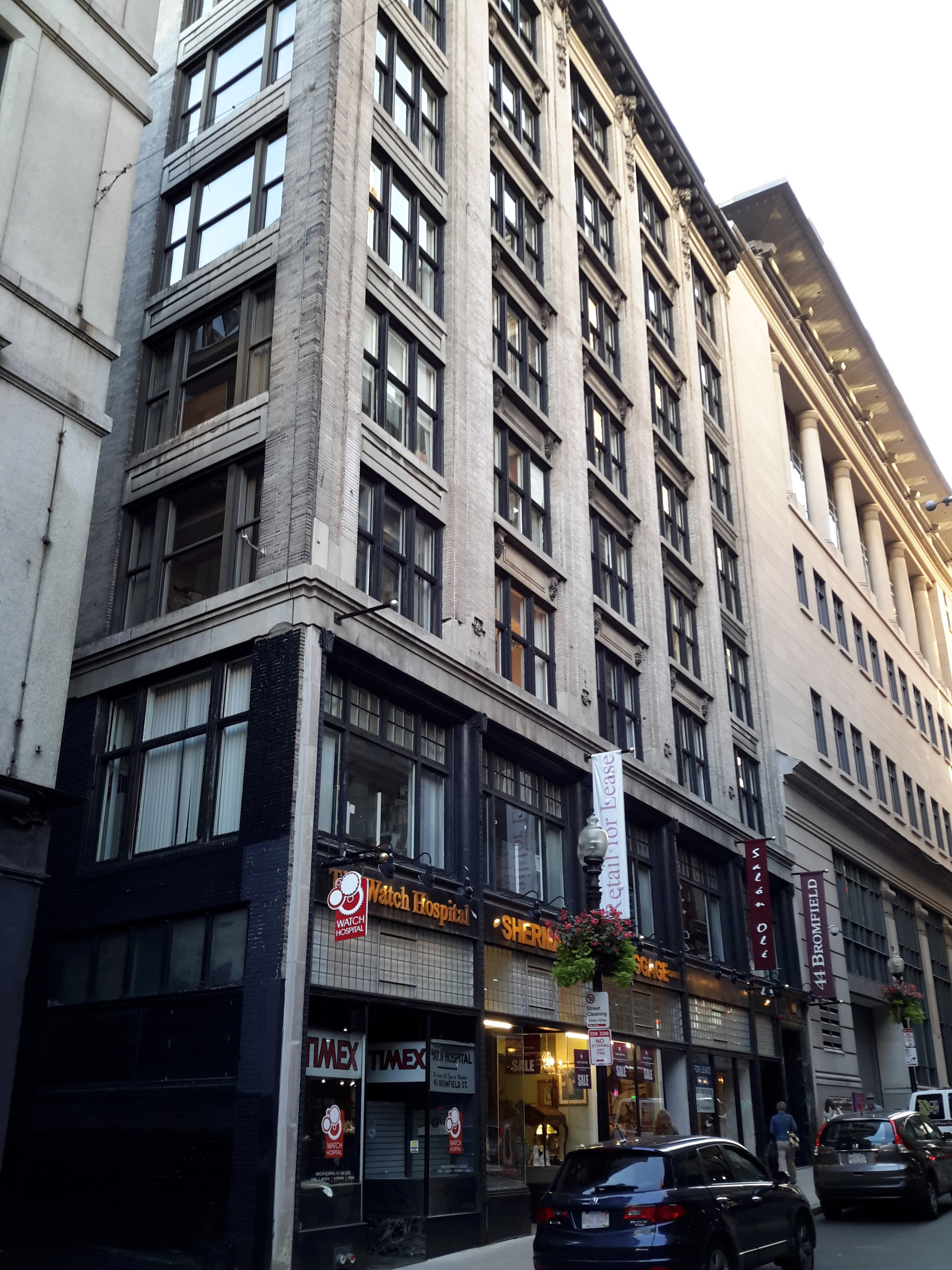
2014 photo of the Publicity Building, from Bromfield Street

== See also ==
- National Register of Historic Places listings in northern Boston, Massachusetts
