= Edward B. Stratton House =

Historic house in Massachusetts, United States

- U.S. National Register of Historic Places
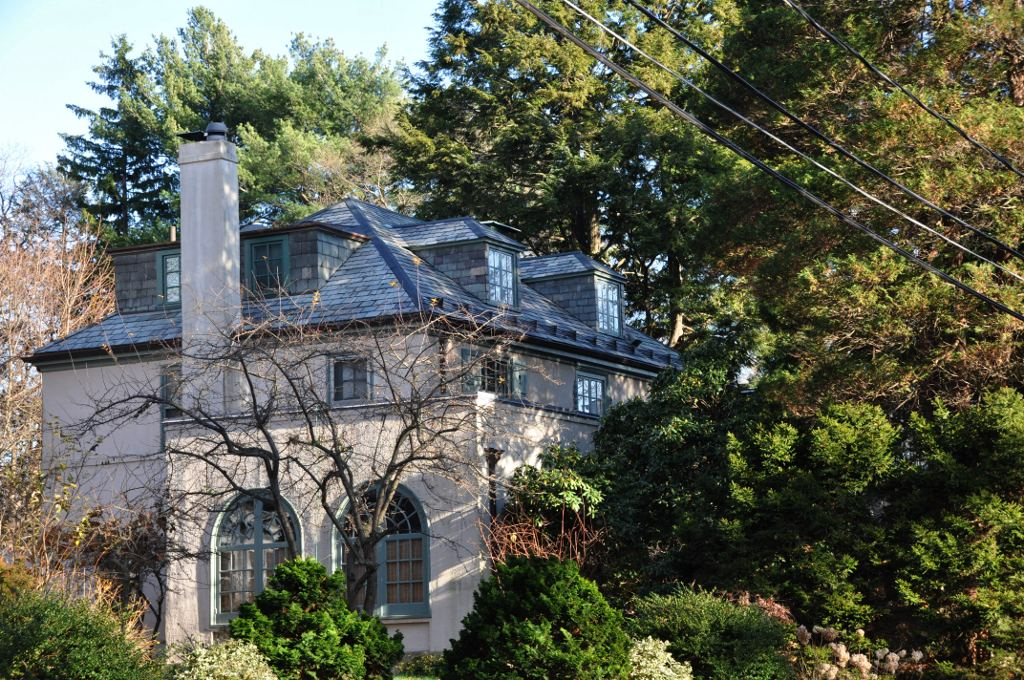

- Location within Massachusetts Location within the United States
- Location: 25 Kenmore St., Newton, Massachusetts
- Coordinates: 42°19′41″N 71°12′15″W
- Built: 1912
- Architect: Stratton, Edward B.
- Architectural style: Colonial Revival, Bungalow/Craftsman
- MPS: Newton MRA
- NRHP reference No.: 90000050
- Added to NRHP: February 16, 1990

The Edward B. Stratton House is a historic house at 25 Kenmore Street in Newton, Massachusetts. It is a two-story stucco-clad structure, with a dormered hip roof. It has a Colonial Revival entrance with fluted pilasters supporting a decorated entablature and broken-gabled pediment. To either side of the entrance, single-story wings project forward, creating an entrance court; the windows of the wings have arched windows. The house was designed by noted regional architect Edward B. Stratton and built in 1912 as his family residence. The building features an eclectic mix of Colonial Revival and Craftsman styling.

The house was listed on the National Register of Historic Places in 1990.

== See also ==
- National Register of Historic Places listings in Newton, Massachusetts
