= The Lenox Hotel =

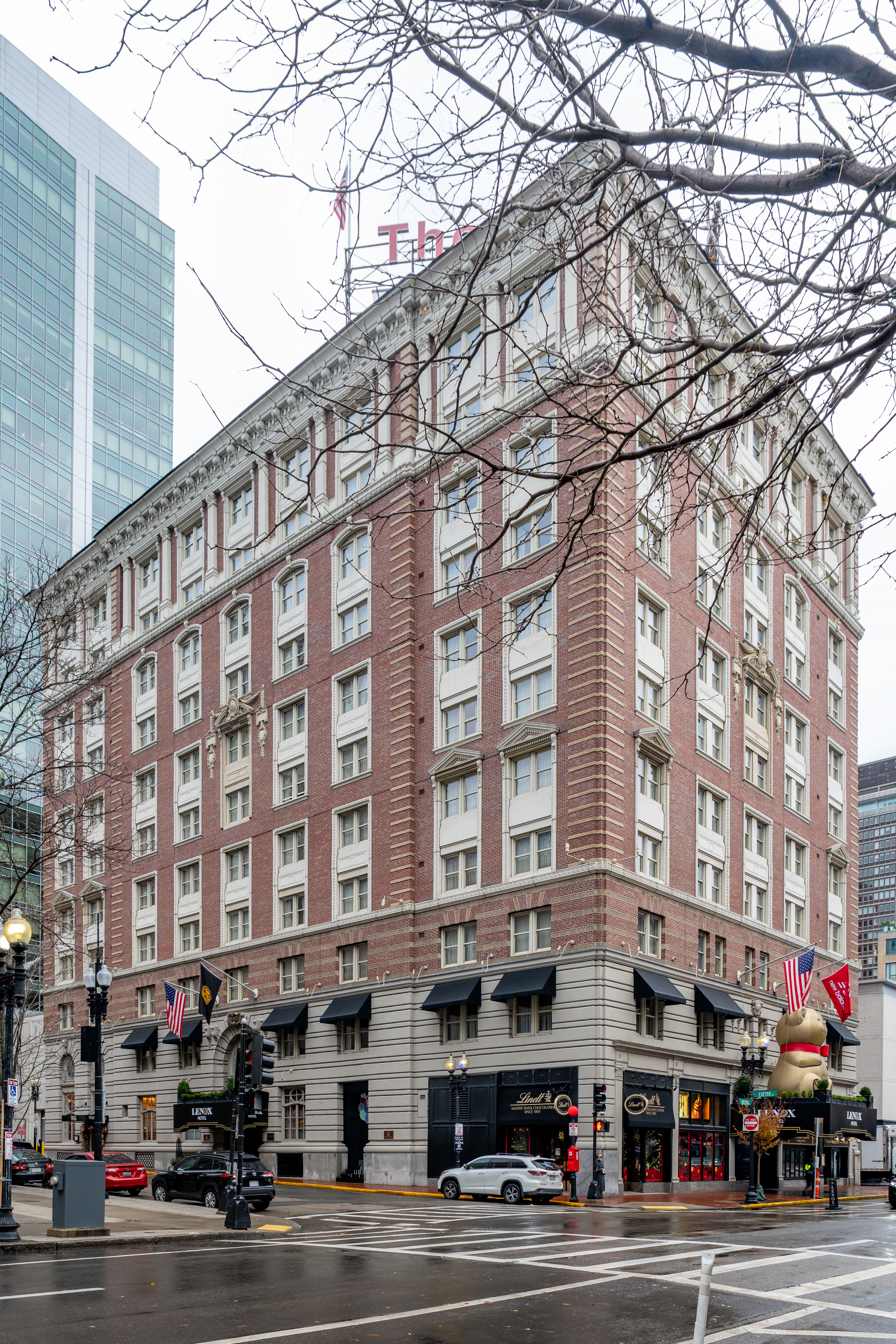
- Viewed from Boylston Street (2025)

- Location within Massachusetts

General information
- Location: 61 Exeter Street, Boston, Massachusetts, U.S.
- Coordinates: 42°20′57.13″N 71°04′45.36″W
- Opening: 1900
- Owner: Saunders Hotel Group
- Operator: Saunders Hotel Group

Technical details
- Floor count: 11

Design and construction
- Developer: George A. Fuller Co.

Other information
- Number of rooms: 214
- Number of suites: 4
- Number of restaurants: 3
- Parking: Valet

Website
- www.lenoxhotel.com

The Lenox Hotel is a hotel in Boston, Massachusetts. It is located at the corner of Boylston and Exeter streets in the Back Bay neighborhood.

The Lenox is a member of Historic Hotels of America, the official program of the National Trust for Historic Preservation.

== History ==
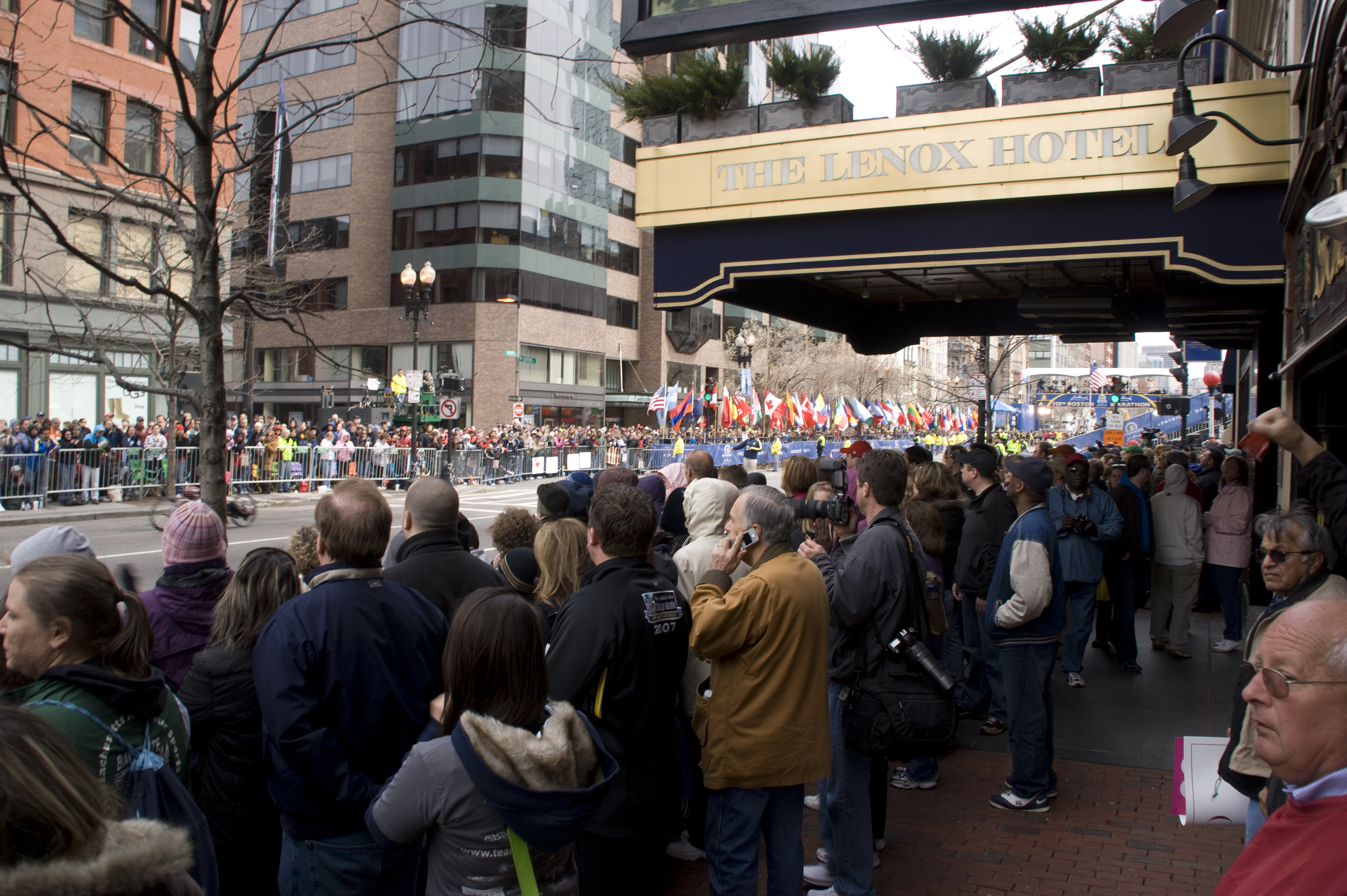
The Boston Marathon finishing next to The Lenox Hotel

The Lenox Hotel was built in 1900 by Lucias Boomer, the owner of New York's Waldorf Astoria, at a cost of $1.1 million. At eleven stories high, it once stood as the tallest building in Boston. The outside was constructed of white and red terra cotta bricks and the inside of the hotel was luxuriously appointed. The hotel is named after the family of Lady Sarah Lennox, a courtier of King George III, who ruled before and during the American Revolution. The Lenox was host to many celebrities, including Enrico Caruso, who arrived at The Lenox in his own private railroad car. The area next to The Lenox was a railroad station until the 1960s, allowing affluent guests to pull their railroad cars up to the hotel and walk right in. Judy Garland, who made The Lenox her home for three months in 1965, currently has one of the hotel's suites named in her honor. In 1963, the Saunders family acquired the hotel, and Roger Saunders was brought on as the general manager.

The Lenox Hotel is located less than a block from the finish line of the Boston Marathon, held every year in April.

The hotel recently underwent a $35 million renovation. Some of the corner suites in the hotel still have functioning wood-burning fireplaces. It is one of the few known buildings left in the world with a functioning Cutler mail chute.

An Irish pub, Sweeney's, is part of the hotel property. It is accessed from Boylston Street. The pub was formerly known as Sólás for around twenty years.
