= Mayall Bruner House =

Historic house in Massachusetts, United States

- U.S. National Register of Historic Places
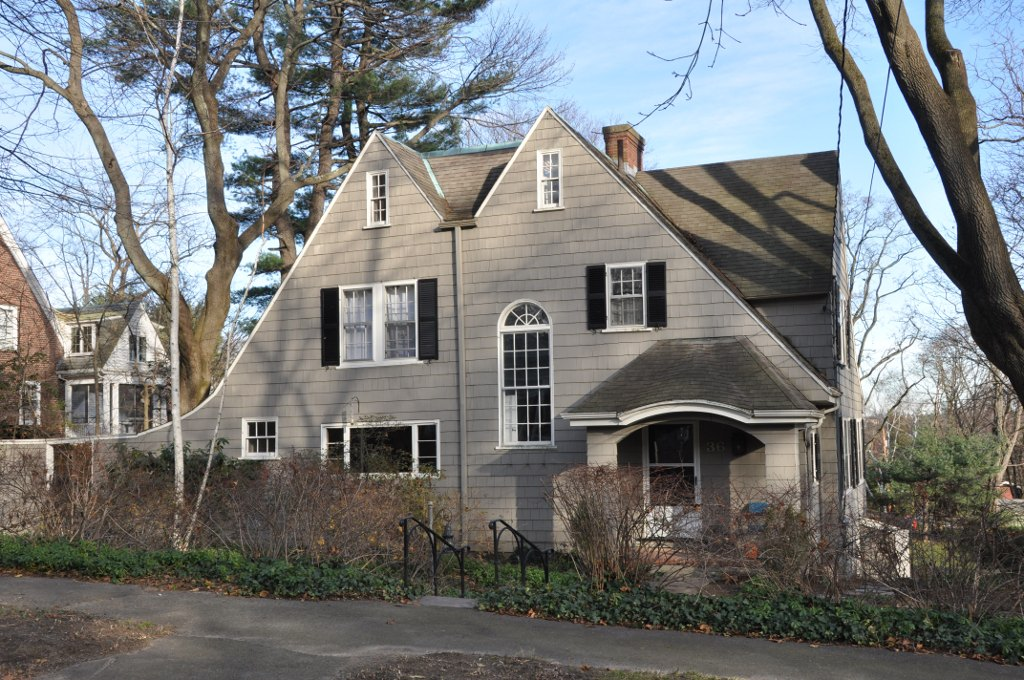

- Location within Massachusetts Location within the United States
- Location: 36 Magnolia Ave., Newton, Massachusetts
- Coordinates: 42°20′43″N 71°10′45″W
- Area: less than one acre
- Built: 1923
- Architect: Bowditch, Arthur H.
- Architectural style: Bungalow/Craftsman
- MPS: Newton MRA
- NRHP reference No.: 90000040
- Added to NRHP: February 16, 1990

The Mayall Bruner House is a historic house at 36 Magnolia Avenue in the Newton Corner neighborhood of Newton, Massachusetts. Built in 1923, it is a well-preserved example of Craftsman architecture. It was listed on the National Register of Historic Places in 1990.

== Description and history ==
The Mayall Bruner House stands in a residential area on the south side of Newton Corner, on the west side of Magnolia Avenue south of Kenrick Street. It is a 2 1/2-story wood-frame structure, with a complex roofline that includes two front facing gables joined by a high cross ridge. At the sides the gable roofs extend further downward, to garden gate on one side and the main entrance on the other. The entry is sheltered by a hip-roof portico with a segmented-arch opening. Windows are of differing shapes and sizes, with one sash window topped by a rounded-arch fixed-pane window, and another that is a three-part picture window. The front-facing gables each have narrow four-over-four windows near their peaks. The south facade is defined by banks of tripled sash windows on both levels.

The house was built in 1923 to a design by Arthur H. Bowditch, a Boston-based architect best known for his commercial buildings. The house is an excellent local example of rustic Craftsman styling. Its exterior has been little altered since construction; the most prominent change is the installation of the picture window, probably in the 1960s. Mayall Bruner was a wool merchant with offices in Boston.

== See also ==
- National Register of Historic Places listings in Newton, Massachusetts
