= Newton Country Day School =

Private girls school in Newton, Massachusetts

Newton Country Day School of the Sacred Heart
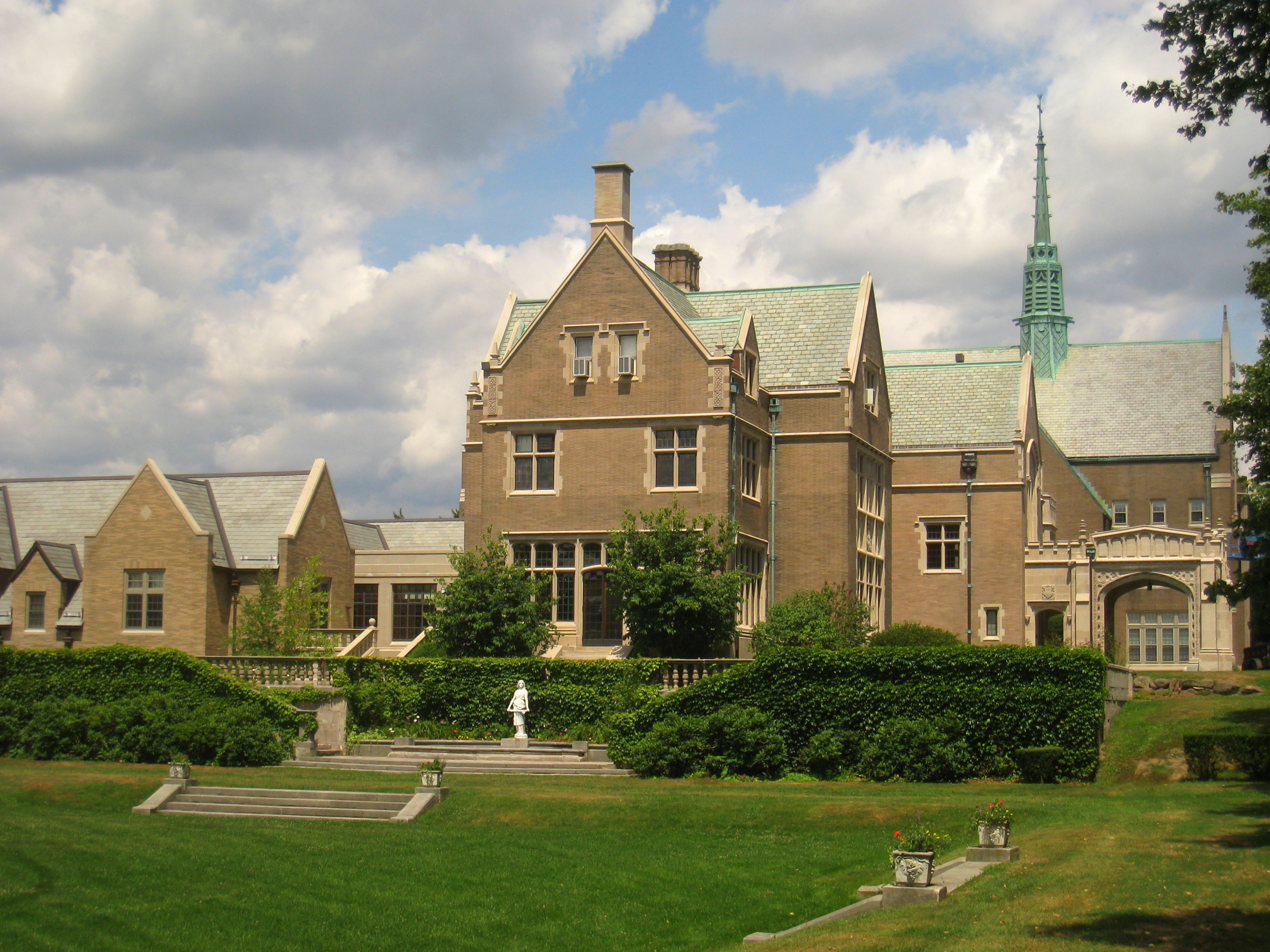

Location
- 785 Centre Street; Newton, (Middlesex County), Massachusetts 02458; United States; 42°20′37″N 71°11′30″W

Information
- Type: Private, All-Girls
- Motto: "Courage and Confidence"
- Religious affiliation: Roman Catholic
- Established: 1880
- Head of school: Jessica Hooper
- Grades: 5–12
  - Grade 7: Camp Burgess. Life Science Fair.
  - Grade 8: Annual 8th Grade Capstone Project. 8th Grade Washington DC trip. Engineering Fair.
- Average class size: 13
- Student to teacher ratio: 6:1
- Campus: Suburban
- Colors: Blue and Silver
- Athletics: Basketball, Crew, Cross Country, Dance, Field Hockey, Golf, Ice Hockey, Lacrosse, Sailing, Soccer, Softball, Squash, Track and Field, Tennis, Volleyball
- Athletics conference: Eastern Independent League
- Mascot: Falcon
- Rival: Dana Hall School
- Accreditation: New England Association of Schools and Colleges
- Publication: Medley (literary magazine), "The Heart" (online newspaper), Très Bien (annual magazine)
- Tuition: $62,200
- Brother school: St. Sebastian's
- Website: www.newtoncountryday.org
- =

Newton Country Day School of the Sacred Heart (often abbreviated to Newton Country Day School, Newton, or NCDS) is a private, all-girls Roman Catholic high school and middle school located on the Loren Towle Estate in Newton, Massachusetts, as part of the Sacred Heart Network of 21 schools in the United States and 44 countries abroad.

== History ==
Newton Country Day School was founded in 1880 as the Boston Academy of the Sacred Heart. It was the twentieth Sacred Heart School to open in the United States, and is a member of the international Network of Sacred Heart Schools, which spans forty-four countries and twenty-one cities in the United States. All Sacred Heart schools are associated with and live by the values of the Society of the Sacred Heart, founded by Saint Madeleine Sophie Barat in 1800 in Paris. Saint Rose Philippine Duchesne established the first foundation of the Society of the Sacred Heart in Missouri in 1818, beginning Sacred Heart education in the Americas.

The school was first located at 5 Chester Square in Boston's South End (now the corner of Massachusetts Avenue and Washington Street), and subsequently in four Back Bay brownstones at 260-266 Commonwealth Avenue. In December 1925 it moved to the Loren Towle Estate in Newton, where the architectural firm of Maginnis and Walsh added a chapel and a four-story school wing completed in 1928. In 1960 a gymnasium/auditorium was finished, with further additions of the Sweeney Husson building in 2002 and 2007 a new and greatly enlarged library. In 2016 the Kathleen R. Martin Wellness Center was opened and blessed by Cardinal Seán Patrick O’Malley, OFM Cap., Archbishop of Boston on April 26 of that year. The Martin Center is a 50,000-square-foot building for dance, athletics, fitness, and wellness. Some key features are two full volleyball and basketball courts, squash courts, a fitness space, an erg room, a dance studio, an athletic training room, and a wellness classroom.

As part of the Sacred Heart Network, NCDS follows the five Goals and Criteria of Sacred Heart Schools. The five goals help express the intentions and hopes of the Sacred Heart 200-year tradition. The school's culture and identity are based on the vision set forth from the goals. Once a student graduates these goals have hopefully become a form of wisdom and strength from which they can draw on throughout their lives.

- Goal I: Schools of the Sacred Heart commit themselves to educate to a personal and active faith in God.
- Goal II: Schools of the Sacred Heart commit themselves to educate to a deep respect for intellectual values.
- Goal III: Schools of the Sacred Heart commit themselves to educate to a social awareness which impels to action.
- Goal IV: Schools of the Sacred Heart commit themselves to educate to the building of community as a Christian value.
- Goal V: Schools of the Sacred Heart commit themselves to educate to personal growth in an atmosphere of wise freedom.

== Notable alumnae ==
- Niia Bertino (2005) — musician, featured on Wyclef Jean's 2007 top 20 single, Sweetest Girl (Dollar Bill)
- Rose Kennedy — philanthropist and socialite
- Kelly Timilty (1962–2012) — Massachusetts politician
- Sarah Van Patten — principal dancer, San Francisco Ballet
- Jane Curtin — actress and comedienne
