= Blake and Amory Building =

- U.S. National Register of Historic Places
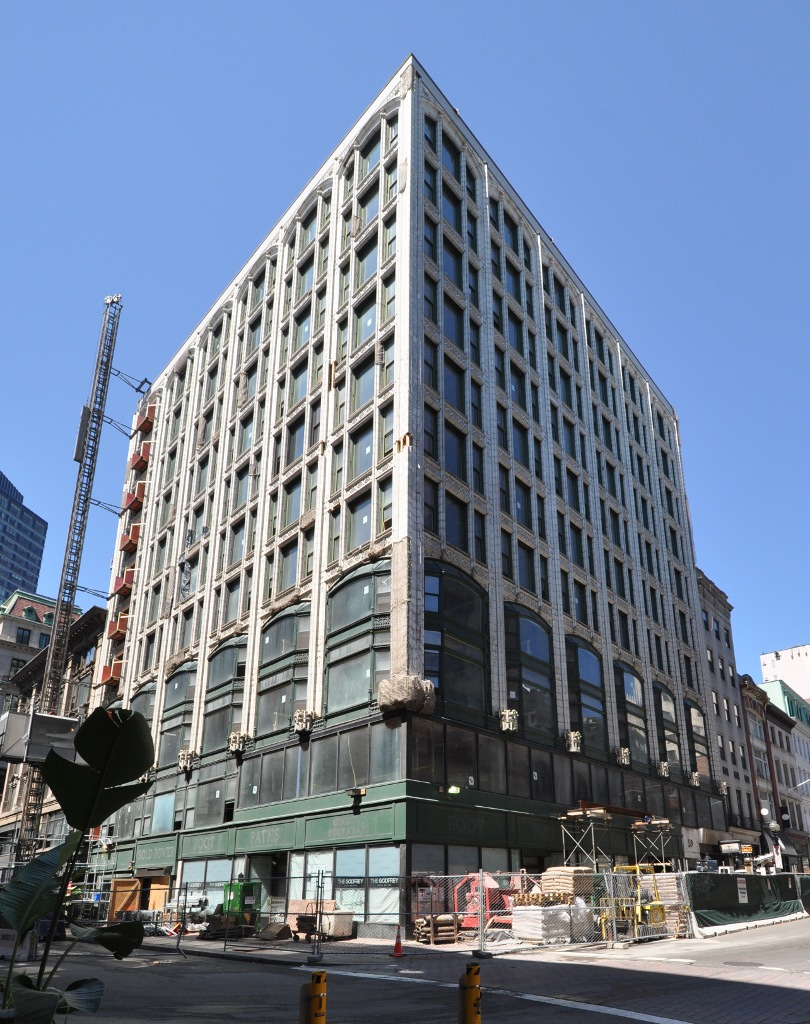

- Location within Boston Location within Massachusetts Location within the United States
- Location: Boston, Massachusetts
- Coordinates: 42°21′17″N 71°3′41″W
- Built: 1904
- Architect: Arthur Hunnewell Bowditch
- Architectural style: Gothic Revival
- NRHP reference No.: 14000272
- Added to NRHP: June 2, 2014

The Blake and Amory Building is a historic commercial building at the corner of Temple Place and Washington Street in Downtown Crossing, historically the main shopping district of Boston, Massachusetts. The eleven-story building was designed by noted Boston architect Arthur Hunnewell Bowditch, and constructed in two phases between 1904 and 1908. The building is architecturally noted for its expanses of windows and Gothic details. Early tenants occupying its upper-level offices were predominantly associated with the garment and fabric trade, with the lower floors housing a variety of retail operations.

The building was listed on the National Register of Historic Places in 2014.

After an extensive renovation project, the Godfrey Hotel Boston opened in the historic Blake and Amory Building in 2016.

== See also ==
- National Register of Historic Places listings in northern Boston, Massachusetts
