= Vermont Building =

- U.S. National Register of Historic Places
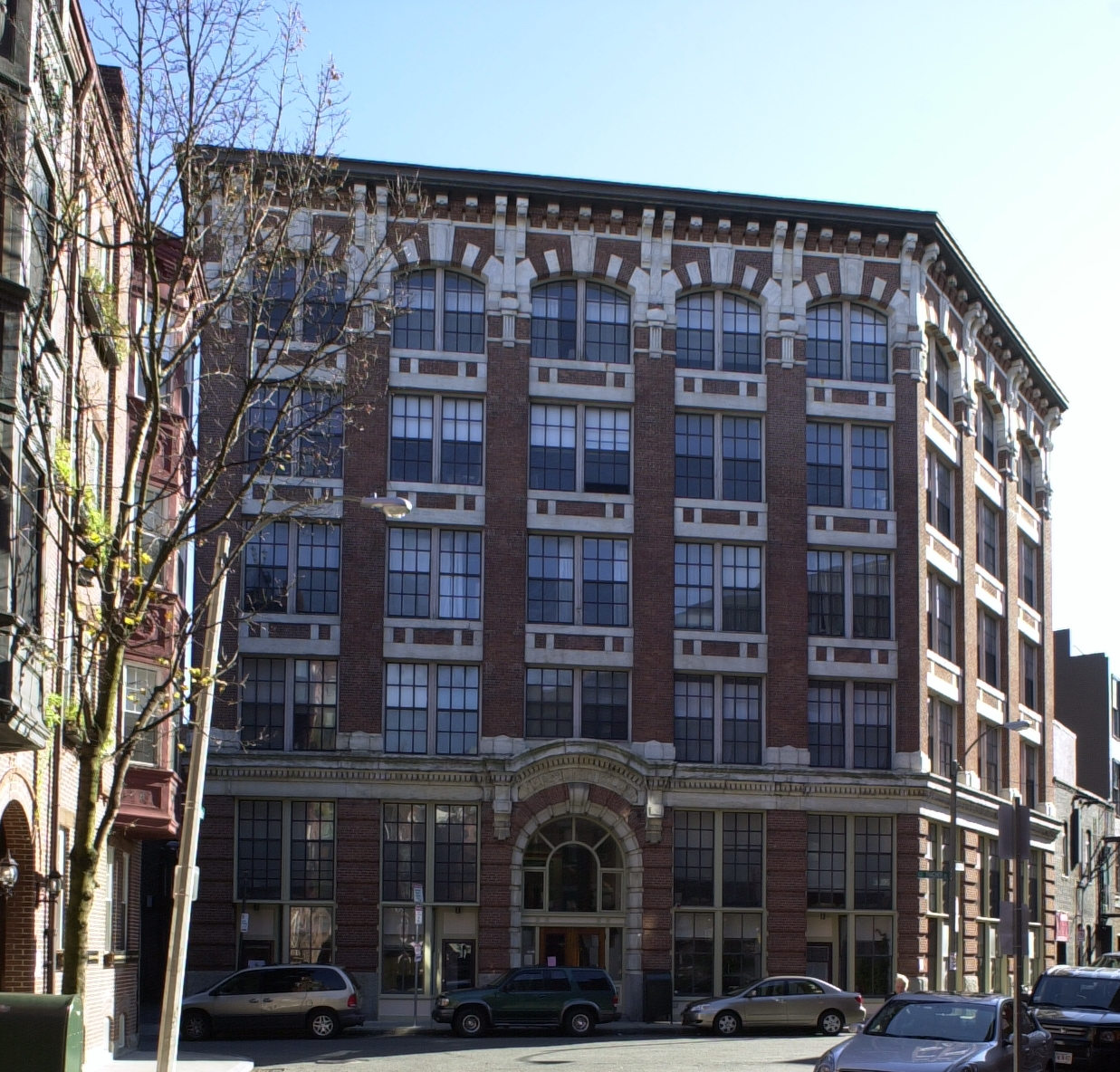

- Location within Boston Location within Massachusetts Location within the United States
- Location: 10 Thacher St., Boston, Massachusetts
- Coordinates: 42°21′55.4″N 71°3′24.1″W
- Area: 0.3 acres (0.12 ha)
- Built: 1904
- Architect: Arthur H. Bowditch and Edward B. Stratton
- Architectural style: Early Commercial, Chicago
- NRHP reference No.: 84000421
- Added to NRHP: November 13, 1984

The Vermont Building is a historic building at 10 Thacher Street (pronounced Thack-er) in the North End neighborhood of Boston, Massachusetts. The six-story brick and marble building was designed by Arthur Bowdith and Edward Stratton and built in 1904. Its construction was funded by Redfield Proctor, a United States senator from Vermont, and one of the owners of the Vermont Marble Company. It originally housed retail establishments on the ground floor, and commercial, warehousing, and light manufacturing facilities on the upper floors, including facilities of the Vermont Marble Company. It now contains loft apartments.

The building was listed on the National Register of Historic Places in 1984.

== See also ==
- National Register of Historic Places listings in northern Boston, Massachusetts
