= 2016 Connecticut House of Representatives election =

- November 8, 2016

All 151 seats in the Connecticut House of Representatives 76 seats needed for a majority
	Majority party	Minority party
Leader	Brendan Sharkey (Retired)	Themis Klarides
Party	Democratic	Republican
Leader's seat	88th District	114th District
Last election	87	64
Seats won	79	72
Seat change	▼8	▲8
Popular vote	665,429	721,415
Percentage	45.12%	48.92%
Swing	▼2.71%	▲1.49%
- Results by district Democratic gain Republican gain Democratic hold Republican hold
Speaker before election
Brendan Sharkey
Democratic
Elected Speaker
Joe Aresimowicz
Democratic

The 2016 Connecticut House of Representatives election was held on Tuesday, November 8, 2016, to elect members to the Connecticut House of Representatives, one from each of the state's 151 General Assembly districts. The date of this the election corresponded with other elections in the state, including races for president, U.S. Senate U.S. House, and the State Senate.

Democrats retained their control of the House of Representatives, but lost 8 seats, being reduced to a three seat majority. Republicans picked up 8 seats, expanding their seat total to 72.

As of 2026, this was the last time Republicans made a net-gain of seats in the Connecticut State House.

== Retirements ==
20 incumbents did not seek re-election in 2016.

=== Democrats ===
1. District 19: Brian Becker retired.
2. District 37: Ed Jutila retired.
3. District 45: Paul Brycki retired.
4. District 56: Claire Janowski retired.
5. District 59: David Kiner retired.
6. District 60: Peggy Sayers retired.
7. District 64: Roberta Willis retired.
8. District 79: Frank Nicastro retired.
9. District 88: Brendan Sharkey retired.
10. District 97: Robert Megna retired.

=== Republicans ===
1. District 2: Dan E. Carter retired to run for U.S. Senate.
2. District 14: Bill Aman retired.
3. District 50: Mike Alberts retired.
4. District 55: Gayle Mulligan retired.
5. District 66: Craig Miner retired to run for State Senate.
6. District 67: Cecilia Buck-Taylor retired.
7. District 74: Selim Noujaim retired.
8. District 103: Al Adinolfi retired.
9. District 135: John Shaban retired to run for the U.S. House of Representatives.
10. District 138: Janice Giegler retired.

== Incumbents defeated ==
Two incumbents, both Democrats, were defeated in the August 9th primary election.

=== In primary election ===
==== Democrats ====
1. District 39: Ernest Hewett lost re-nomination to Chris Soto.
2. District 116: Louis Esposito lost re-nomination to Michael DiMassa.

=== In general election ===
==== Democrats ====
1. District 22: Betty Boukus lost re-election to William Petit.
2. District 36: Phillip Miller lost re-election to Robert W. Siegrist III.
3. District 44: Christine Rosati Randall lost re-election to Anne Dauphinais.
4. District 58: David J. Alexander lost re-election to Greg Stokes.
5. District 81: David Zoni lost re-election to John Fusco.
6. District 105: Theresa Conroy lost re-election to Nicole Klarides-Ditria.

==== Republicans ====
1. District 40: John F. Scott lost re-election to Christine Conley.
2. District 41: Aundre Bumgardner lost re-election to Joe de la Cruz.

== Predictions ==
Source	Ranking	As of
Governing	Lean D	November 4, 2016

== Special elections ==
=== District 107 (Special) ===
Representative David Scribner won re-election to a new term 2014, but resigned from office and declined to be sworn in for a new term. He instead accepted an appointment to the Connecticut Liquor Control Commission, causing the special election.

February 24, 2015 Connecticut's 107th State House district special election
Party	Candidate	Votes	%
Republican	Stephen Harding	1,600	54.24%
Democratic	Howard Lasser	1,350	45.76%
Total votes		2,950	100.00%
Republican hold			

=== District 129 (Special) ===
A special election was called after the resignation of Representative Auden Grogins, following her appointment to the Connecticut Superior Court.

February 24, 2015 Connecticut's 129th State House district special election
Party	Candidate	Votes	%
Democratic	Steven Stafstrom	776	44.52%
Republican	Enrique Torres	720	41.31%
Unaffiliated	Robert T. Keeley Jr.	154	8.84%
Unaffiliated	Robert E. Halstead	48	2.75%
Unaffiliated	Héctor A. Díaz	45	2.58%
Total votes		1,743	100.00%
Democratic hold			

=== District 121 (Special) ===
A special election was called following the death of Representative Terry Backer from brain cancer on December 14, 2015.

February 2, 2016 Connecticut's 121st State House district special election
Party	Candidate	Votes	%
Democratic	Joe Gresko	1,339	60.56%
Republican	Susan Barksdale	872	39.44%
Total votes		2,211	100.00%
Democratic hold			

=== District 75 (Special) ===
A special election was called after the resignation of Representative Victor Cuevas, following a federal investigation into a home loan he took out for his son.

April 26, 2016 Connecticut's 75th State House district special election
Party	Candidate	Votes	%
Democratic	Geraldo Reyes	960	76.86%
Republican	Raymond Work	289	23.14%
Total votes		2,211	100.00%
Democratic hold			

=== District 90 (Special) ===
A special election, held concurrently with the regularly scheduled general election, was called after the passing of Representative Mary Fritz from cancer on July 9, 2016.

November 8, 2016 Connecticut's 90th State House district special election
Party	Candidate	Votes	%
Republican	Craig C. Fishbein	6,570	58.02%
Democratic	Patrick Reynolds	4,752	41.98%
Total votes		2,211	100.00%
Republican gain from Democratic			

== Results ==
↓
79	72
Democratic	Republican

Parties	Candidates	Seats				Popular vote		
Parties	Candidates	2014	2016	+/-	Strength	Vote	%	Change
Democratic	125	87	79	▼8	52.32%	665,429	45.12%	▼2.71%
Republican	131	64	72	▲8	47.68%	721,415	48.92%	▲1.49%
Independent Party	79 (Note: 77 of the candidates were cross-endorsed with another party, 2 candidates were solely nominated by the Independent Party of Connecticut)	0	0	Steady	0.00%	39,356	2.67%	▲0.49%
Working Families	64 (Note: 62 of the candidates were cross-endorsed with another party, 2 candidates were solely nominated by the Working Families Party)	0	0	Steady	0.00%	31,892	2.16%	▲0.84%
Green	10 (Note: 1 candidate was cross-endorsed with another party, 9 candidates were solely nominated by the Green Party of Connecticut)	0	0	Steady	0.00%	5,279	0.36%	▼0.03%
Unaffiliated/Write-ins	13	0	0	Steady	0.00%	4,885	0.33%	▲0.17%
Libertarian	2	0	0	Steady	0.00%	1,265	0.09%	▲0.01%
Bottom Line Party	1 (Note: 1 candidate was cross-endorsed by the Bottom Line Party)	0	0	Steady	0.00%	56	<0.01%	▼0.12%
Total	285 (Note: 285 individual candidates ran across 425 ballot lines)	151	151		100.00%	1,468,922	100.00%	100.00%

House seats
Democratic	52.32%
Republican	47.68%

Popular vote
Republican	48.92%
Democratic	45.12%
Independent Party	2.67%
Working Families	2.16%

== Election results ==
=== District 1 ===
2016 Connecticut State House of Representatives election, District 1
Party	Candidate	Votes	%
Democratic	Matthew Ritter (Incumbent)	5,662	92.05%
Republican	Ken Lerman	489	7.95%
Total votes		6,151	100.00%
Democratic hold			

=== District 2 ===
2016 Connecticut State House of Representatives election, District 2
Party	Candidate	Votes	%
Republican	William Duff	5,727	48.8%
Independent Party	William Duff	285	2.4%
Total	William Duff	6,012	51.2%
Democratic	Raghib Allie-Brennan	5,353	45.6%
Working Families	Raghib Allie-Brennan	377	3.2%
Total	Raghib Allie-Brennan	5,730	48.8%
Total votes		6,151	100.00%
Republican hold			

=== District 3 ===
2016 Connecticut State House of Representatives election, District 3
Party	Candidate	Votes	%
Democratic	Minnie Gonzalez (Incumbent)	4,454	100%
Total votes		4,454	100.00%
Democratic hold			

=== District 4 ===
2016 Connecticut State House of Representatives election, District 4
Party	Candidate	Votes	%
Democratic	Angel Arce (Incumbent)	4,063	87.1%
Republican	A. Lloyd Carter	489	12.9%
Total votes		4,664	100.00%
Democratic hold			

=== District 5 ===
2016 Connecticut State House of Representatives election, District 5
Party	Candidate	Votes	%
Democratic	Brandon McGee (Incumbent)	7,515	81.86%
Republican	Paul Panos	1,662	18.1%
Write-In	Charles Jackson	3	0.03%
Total votes		9,180	100.00%
Democratic hold			

=== District 6 ===
2016 Connecticut State House of Representatives election, District 6
Party	Candidate	Votes	%
Democratic	Edwin Vargas	5,173	85.0%
Working Families	Edwin Vargas	249	4.1%
Total	Edwin Vargas (Incumbent)	5,422	89.1%
Republican	Russell Williams	662	10.9%
Total votes		6,084	100.00%
Democratic hold			

=== District 7 ===
2016 Connecticut State House of Representatives election, District 7
Party	Candidate	Votes	%
Democratic	Douglas McCrory (Incumbent)	5,589	94.2%
Unaffiliated	Paul Panos	346	5.8%
Total votes		5,935	100.00%
Democratic hold			

=== District 8 ===
2016 Connecticut State House of Representatives election, District 8
Party	Candidate	Votes	%
Republican	Tim Ackert (Incumbent)	8,864	65.6%
Democratic	Thomas Currier	4,245	31.4%
Working Families	Thomas Currier	401	3.0%
Total	Thomas Currier	4,626	34.4%
Total votes		13,510	100.00%
Republican hold			

=== District 9 ===
2016 Connecticut State House of Representatives election, District 9
Party	Candidate	Votes	%
Democratic	Jason Rojas (Incumbent)	7,224	87.1%
Libertarian	Richard Lion	1,070	12.9%
Total votes		8,294	100.00%
Democratic hold			

=== District 10 ===
2016 Connecticut State House of Representatives election, District 10
Party	Candidate	Votes	%
Democratic	Henry Genga	5,854	70.4%
Working Families	Henry Genga	392	4.7%
Total	Henry Genga (Incumbent)	6,246	75.1%
Republican	Travis J. Simpson	2,070	24.9%
Total votes		8,316	100.00%
Democratic hold			

=== District 11 ===
2016 Connecticut State House of Representatives election, District 11
Party	Candidate	Votes	%
Democratic	Jeffrey Currey (Incumbent)	5,794	100%
Total votes		5,794	100.00%
Democratic hold			

=== District 12 ===
2016 Connecticut State House of Representatives election, District 12
Party	Candidate	Votes	%
Democratic	Kelly Juleson Scopino	5,810	56.3%
Working Families	Kelly Juleson-Scopino	503	4.9%
Total	Kelly Juleson-Scopino (Incumbent)	6,313	61.2%
Republican	John D. Topping	3,678	35.7%
Independent Party	John D. Topping	322	3.1%
Total	John D. Topping	4,000	38.8%
Total votes		10,313	100.00%
Democratic hold			

=== District 13 ===
2016 Connecticut State House of Representatives election, District 13
Party	Candidate	Votes	%
Republican	Mark Tweedie	5,501	47.6%
Independent Party	Mark Tweedie	411	3.6%
Total	Mark Tweedie (Incumbent)	5,912	51.2%
Democratic	Joe Diminico	5,274	45.6%
Working Families	Joe Diminico	243	3.2%
Total	Joe Diminico	5,517	48.8%
Total votes		11,559	100.00%
Republican hold			

=== District 14 ===
2016 Connecticut State House of Representatives election, District 14
Party	Candidate	Votes	%
Republican	Tom Delnicki	6,453	49.55%
Independent Party	Tom Delnicki	399	3.06%
Total	Tom Delnicki	6,852	52.61%
Democratic	Saud Anwar	5,847	44.90%
Working Families	Saud Anwar	323	2.48%
Total	Saud Anwar	6,170	47.38%
Total votes		13,022	100.00%
Republican hold			

=== District 15 ===
2016 Connecticut State House of Representatives election, District 15
Party	Candidate	Votes	%
Democratic	David Baram	10,139	93.9%
Working Families	David Baram	663	6.1%
Total	David Baram (Incumbent)	10,802	100%
Total votes		10,802	100.00%
Democratic hold			

=== District 16 ===
2016 Connecticut State House of Representatives election, District 16
Party	Candidate	Votes	%
Democratic	John Hampton (Incumbent)	7,011	50.8%
Republican	Lydia Tedone	6,362	46.1%
Independent Party	Lydia Tedone	358	2.6%
Total	Lydia Tedone	6,720	48.7%
Unaffiliated	Robert Kalechman	75	0.5%
Total votes		13,806	100.00%
Democratic hold			

=== District 17 ===
2016 Connecticut State House of Representatives election, District 17
Party	Candidate	Votes	%
Republican	Timothy LeGeyt (Incumbent)	10,337	100%
Total votes		10,337	100.00%
Republican hold			

=== District 18 ===
2016 Connecticut State House of Representatives election, District 18
Party	Candidate	Votes	%
Democratic	Andy Fleischmann (Incumbent)	7,474	64.8%
Republican	Robert Levine	3,733	32.4%
Independent Party	Robert Levine	319	2.8%
Total	Robert Levine	4,052	35.2%
Total votes		11,526	100.00%
Democratic hold			

=== District 19 ===
2016 Connecticut State House of Representatives election, District 19
Party	Candidate	Votes	%
Democratic	Derek Slap	7,669	53.8%
Republican	Chris Barnes	6,313	44.4%
Independent Party	Chris Barnes	260	1.8%
Total	Chris Barnes	6,573	46.2%
Total votes		14,242	100.00%
Democratic hold			

=== District 20 ===
2016 Connecticut State House of Representatives election, District 20
Party	Candidate	Votes	%
Democratic	Joseph Verrengia (Incumbent)	8,161	100%
Total votes		8,161	100.00%
Democratic hold			

=== District 21 ===
2016 Connecticut State House of Representatives election, District 21
Party	Candidate	Votes	%
Democratic	Mike Demicco	6,616	50.1%
Working Families	Mike Demicco	431	3.3%
Total	Mike Demicco (Incumbent)	7,047	53.4%
Republican	Chris Forster	5,894	44.7%
Independent Party	Chris Forster	253	1.9%
Total	Chris Forster	6,147	46.6%
Total votes		13,194	100.00%
Democratic hold			

=== District 22 ===
2016 Connecticut State House of Representatives election, District 22
Party	Candidate	Votes	%
Republican	William Petit	5,765	54.5%
Independent Party	William Petit	594	5.6%
Total	William Petit	6,359	60.1%
Democratic	Betty Boukus (Incumbent)	4,229	39.9%
Total votes		10,588	100.00%
Republican gain from Democratic			

=== District 23 ===
2016 Connecticut State House of Representatives election, District 23
Party	Candidate	Votes	%
Republican	Devin Carney	9,139	87.5%
Independent Party	Devin Carney	1,308	12.5%
Total	Devin Carney	10,447	100%
Total votes		10,447	100.00%
Republican hold			

=== District 24 ===
2016 Connecticut State House of Representatives election, District 24
Party	Candidate	Votes	%
Democratic	Rick Lopes	4,845	60.1%
Working Families	Rick Lopes	364	4.5%
Total	Rick Lopes (Incumbent)	5,209	64.6%
Republican	James Sanders	2,855	35.4%
Total votes		8,064	100.00%
Democratic hold			

=== District 25 ===
2016 Connecticut State House of Representatives election, District 25
Party	Candidate	Votes	%
Democratic	Bobby Sanchez	4,042	75.3%
Working Families	Bobby Sanchez	307	5.7%
Total	Bobby Sanchez (Incumbent)	4,349	81%
Republican	Richard Gadomski	897	16.7%
Green	Martha Kelly	126	2.3%
Total votes		5,372	100.00%
Democratic hold			

=== District 26 ===
2016 Connecticut State House of Representatives election, District 26
Party	Candidate	Votes	%
Democratic	Peter Tercyak	4,221	65.6%
Working Families	Peter Tercyak	433	6.7%
Total	Peter Tercyak (Incumbent)	4,654	72.3%
Republican	Desiree Agosto	1,785	27.7%
Total votes		6,439	100.00%
Democratic hold			

=== District 27 ===
2016 Connecticut State House of Representatives election, District 27
Party	Candidate	Votes	%
Republican	Gary Byron	6,129	49.9%
Independent Party	Gary Byron	495	4.0%
Total	Gary Byron (Incumbent)	6,624	53.9%
Democratic	Joshua Shulman	5,351	43.5%
Working Families	Joshua Shulman	319	2.6%
Total	Joshua Shulman	5,670	46.1%
Total votes		12,294	100.00%
Republican hold			

=== District 28 ===
2016 Connecticut State House of Representatives election, District 28
Party	Candidate	Votes	%
Democratic	Russell Morin	6,349	49.30%
Working Families	Russell Morin	407	3.16%
Total	Russell A. Morin (Incumbent)	6,756	52.46%
Republican	Mike Hurley	5,782	44.90%
Independent Party	Mike Hurley	189	1.47%
Total	Mike Hurley	5,971	46.37%
Unaffiliated	Lee N. Johnson	151	1.17%
Total votes		12,878	100.00%
Democratic hold			

=== District 29 ===
2016 Connecticut State House of Representatives election, District 29
Party	Candidate	Votes	%
Democratic	Tony Guerrera (Incumbent)	7,413	62.4%
Republican	Todd Brown	4,476	37.6%
Total votes		11,889	100.00%
Democratic hold			

=== District 30 ===
2016 Connecticut State House of Representatives election, District 30
Party	Candidate	Votes	%
Democratic	Joe Aresimowicz	6,215	46.8%
Working Families	Joe Aresimowicz	671	5.1%
Total	Joe Aresimowicz (Incumbent)	6,886	51.9%
Republican	Christopher Morelli	6,389	48.1%
Total votes		13,275	100.00%
Democratic hold			

=== District 31 ===
2016 Connecticut State House of Representatives election, District 31
Party	Candidate	Votes	%
Republican	Prasad Srinivasan	9,129	64.8%
Independent Party	Prasad Srinivasan	488	3.5%
Total	Prasad Srinivasan (Incumbent)	9,617	68.3%
Democratic	Matt Saunig	4,253	30.2%
Working Families	Matt Saunig	217	1.5%
Total	Matt Saunig	4,470	31.7%
Total votes		14,087	100.00%
Republican hold			

=== District 32 ===
2016 Connecticut State House of Representatives election, District 32
Party	Candidate	Votes	%
Republican	Christie Carpino	7,658	60.5%
Independent Party	Christie Carpino	605	4.8%
Total	Christie Carpino (Incumbent)	8,263	65.3%
Democratic	Myron Johnson	4,395	34.7%
Total votes		12,658	100.00%
Republican hold			

=== District 33 ===
2016 Connecticut State House of Representatives election, District 33
Party	Candidate	Votes	%
Democratic	Joseph Serra (Incumbent)	5,648	57.8%
Republican	Linda Szynkowicz	3,811	48.9%
Independent Party	Linda Szynkowicz	319	3.3%
Total	Linda Szynkowicz	4,130	42.2%
Total votes		9,778	100.00%
Democratic hold			

=== District 34 ===
2016 Connecticut State House of Representatives election, District 34
Party	Candidate	Votes	%
Republican	Melissa Ziobron	9,032	%
Independent Party	Melissa Ziobron	1,427	%
Total	Melissa Ziobron (Incumbent)	10,459	100%
Total votes		10,459	100.00%
Republican hold			

=== District 35 ===
2016 Connecticut State House of Representatives election, District 35
Party	Candidate	Votes	%
Republican	Jesse MacLachlan	7,392	57.1%
Independent Party	Jesse MacLachlan	337	2.6%
Total	Jesse MacLachlan (Incumbent)	7,729	59.7%
Democratic	Ellen Dahlgren	4,854	37.5%
Libertarian	Austin Coco	195	1.5%
Green	Ian Barron	168	1.3%
Total votes		12,946	100.00%
Republican hold			

=== District 36 ===
2016 Connecticut State House of Representatives election, District 36
Party	Candidate	Votes	%
Republican	Robert W. Siegrist III	6,576	48.2%
Independent Party	Robert W. Siegrist III	399	2.9%
Total	Robert W. Siegrist III (Incumbent)	6,975	51.1%
Democratic	Philip Miller	6,662	48.9%
Total votes		13,637	100.00%
Republican hold			

=== District 37 ===
2016 Connecticut State House of Representatives election, District 37
Party	Candidate	Votes	%
Republican	Holly Cheeseman	6,393	52.5%
Independent Party	Holly Cheeseman	434	3.6%
Total	Holly Cheeseman	6,827	56.1%
Democratic	Beth Hogan	5,342	43.9%
Total votes		12,169	100.00%
Republican gain from Democratic			

=== District 38 ===
2016 Connecticut State House of Representatives election, District 38
Party	Candidate	Votes	%
Republican	Kathleen McCarty	6,261	51.1%
Independent Party	Kathleen McCarty	486	4.0%
Total	Kathleen McCarty (Incumbent)	6,747	55.1%
Democratic	Sharon Palmer	4,697	38.4%
Working Families	Sharon Palmer	315	2.6%
Total	Sharon Palmer	5,012	41%
Green	Lauren Shaw	477	3.9%
Total votes		12,236	100.00%
Republican hold			

=== District 39 ===
2016 Connecticut State House of Representatives election, District 39
Party	Candidate	Votes	%
Democratic	Chris Soto	4,697	83.7%
Unaffiliated	Andrew Lockwood	517	8.8%
Green	Ronna Stuller	440	7.5%
Total votes		5,861	100.00%
Democratic hold			

=== District 40 ===
2016 Connecticut State House of Representatives election, District 40
Party	Candidate	Votes	%
Democratic	Christine Conley	3,667	48.8%
Working Families	Christine Conley	411	5.5%
Total	Christine Conley	4,078	54.3%
Republican	John F. Scott	3,207	42.6%
Independent Party	John F. Scott	232	3.1%
Total	John F. Scott (Incumbent)	3,439	45.7%
Total votes		7,517	100.00%
Democratic gain from Republican			

=== District 41 ===
2016 Connecticut State House of Representatives election, District 41
Party	Candidate	Votes	%
Democratic	Joe de la Cruz	5,153	50.1%
Working Families	Joe de la Cruz	483	4.7%
Total	Joe de la Cruz	5,636	54.8%
Republican	Aundre Bumgardner	4,337	42.2%
Independent Party	Aundre Bumgardner	309	3.0%
Total	Aundre Bumgardner (Incumbent)	4,646	45.2%
Total votes		10,282	100.00%
Democratic gain from Republican			

=== District 42 ===
2016 Connecticut State House of Representatives election, District 42
Party	Candidate	Votes	%
Republican	Mike France	6,489	85.4%
Independent Party	Mike France	1,105	14.6%
Total	Mike France (Incumbent)	7,594	100%
Total votes		7,594	100.00%
Republican hold			

=== District 43 ===
2016 Connecticut State House of Representatives election, District 43
Party	Candidate	Votes	%
Democratic	Diana Urban (Incumbent)	7,849	61.5%
Republican	Nicholas Mullane	4,915	38.5%
Total votes		12,764	100.00%
Democratic hold			

=== District 44 ===
2016 Connecticut State House of Representatives election, District 44
Party	Candidate	Votes	%
Republican	Anne Dauphinais	5,044	64.4%
Independent Party	Anne Dauphinais	548	5.9%
Total	Anne Dauphinais	5,592	60.3%
Democratic	Christine Rosati Randall	3,235	34.9%
Working Families	Christine Rosati Randall	442	4.8%
Total	Christine Rosati Randall (Incumbent)	3,677	39.7%
Total votes		9,269	100.00%
Republican gain from Democratic			

=== District 45 ===
2016 Connecticut State House of Representatives election, District 45
Party	Candidate	Votes	%
Republican	Kevin Skulczyck	5,818	56.8%
Independent Party	Kevin Skulczyck	571	5.6%
Total	Kevin Skulczyck	6,389	62.4%
Democratic	Tracey Hanson	3,278	32.0%
Working Families	Tracey Hanson	573	5.6%
Total	Tracey Hanson	3,851	37.6%
Total votes		10,240	100.00%
Republican gain from Democratic			

=== District 46 ===
2016 Connecticut State House of Representatives election, District 46
Party	Candidate	Votes	%
Democratic	Emmett Riley	3,265	47.9%
Working Families	Emmett Riley	271	4.0%
Total	Emmett Riley (Incumbent)	3,536	51.9%
Republican	Rob Dempsky	2,406	35.3%
Independent Party	Rob Dempsky	264	3.9%
Total	Rob Dempsky	2,670	39.2%
Unaffiliated	Bonita Bonnie Hong	610	8.9%
Total votes		6,816	100.00%
Democratic hold			

=== District 47 ===
2016 Connecticut State House of Representatives election, District 47
Party	Candidate	Votes	%
Republican	Doug Dubitsky	6,853	56.0%
Independent Party	Doug Dubitsky	470	3.8%
Total	Doug Dubitsky (Incumbent)	7,323	59.8%
Democratic	Kate Donnelly	4,358	45.6%
Working Families	Kate Donnelly	560	4.6%
Total	Kate Donnelly	4,918	40.2%
Total votes		12,241	100.00%
Republican hold			

=== District 48 ===
2016 Connecticut State House of Representatives election, District 48
Party	Candidate	Votes	%
Democratic	Linda Orange	5,979	49.9%
Working Families	Linda Orange	723	6.1%
Total	Linda Orange (Incumbent)	6,702	56%
Republican	Evan Evans	5,275	44%
Total votes		11,977	100.00%
Democratic hold			

=== District 49 ===
2016 Connecticut State House of Representatives election, District 49
Party	Candidate	Votes	%
Democratic	Susan Johnson	4,461	59.68%
Working Families	Susan Johnson	451	6.03%
Total	Susan Johnson (Incumbent)	4,912	65.71%
Republican	Tony Fantoli	2,289	30.62%
Independent Party	Tony Fantoli	218	2.92%
Bottom Line Party	Tony Fantoli	56	.75%
Total	Tony Fantoli	2,563	34.29%
Total votes		7,475	100.00%
Democratic hold			

=== District 50 ===
2016 Connecticut State House of Representatives election, District 50
Party	Candidate	Votes	%
Democratic	Pat Boyd	5,460	47.5%
Working Families	Pat Boyd	783	6.8%
Total	Pat Boyd	6,243	54.3%
Republican	Nora Valentine	5,165	44.9%
Write-In	Ty Perry	86	0.7%
Total votes		11,494	100.00%
Democratic gain from Republican			

=== District 51 ===
2016 Connecticut State House of Representatives election, District 51
Party	Candidate	Votes	%
Democratic	Daniel Rovero (Incumbent)	5,548	57.9%
Republican	Brian Lynch	4,028	42.1%
Total votes		9,576	100.00%
Democratic hold			

=== District 52 ===
2016 Connecticut State House of Representatives election, District 52
Party	Candidate	Votes	%
Republican	Kurt Vail	6,365	55.7%
Independent Party	Kurt Vail	292	2.6%
Total	Kurt Vail (Incumbent)	6,657	58.3%
Democratic	Kathy Bachiochi	3,694	32.3%
Working Families	Kathy Bachiochi	486	4.3%
Total	Kathy Bachiochi	4,180	36.6%
Unaffiliated	Linda Louise LaCasse	587	5.1%
Total votes		11,424	100.00%
Republican hold			

=== District 53 ===
2016 Connecticut State House of Representatives election, District 53
Party	Candidate	Votes	%
Republican	Sam Belsito	6,146	48.3%
Independent Party	Sam Belsito	239	1.9%
Total	Sam Belsito (Incumbent)	6,385	50.2%
Democratic	Susan Eastwood	5,727	45.0%
Working Families	Susan Eastwood	610	4.8%
Total	Susan Eastwood	6,337	49.8%
Total votes		12,722	100.00%
Republican hold			

=== District 54 ===
2016 Connecticut State House of Representatives election, District 54
Party	Candidate	Votes	%
Democratic	Gregory Haddad	6,621	70.9%
Working Families	Gregory Haddad	406	4.4%
Total	Gregory Haddad (Incumbent)	7,027	75.3%
Republican	Mark Sargent	2,096	22.4%
Independent Party	Mark Sargent	210	2.3%
Total	Mark Sargent	2,306	24.7%
Total votes		9,333	100.00%
Democratic hold			

=== District 55 ===
2016 Connecticut State House of Representatives election, District 55
Party	Candidate	Votes	%
Republican	Robin Green	9,466	100%
Total votes		9,466	100.00%
Republican hold			

=== District 56 ===
2016 Connecticut State House of Representatives election, District 56
Party	Candidate	Votes	%
Democratic	Mike Winkler	5,023	47.6%
Working Families	Mike Winkler	433	4.1%
Total	Mike Winkler	5,456	51.7%
Republican	Jim Tedford	4,803	45.6%
Independent Party	Jim Tedford	288	2.7%
Total	Jim Tedford	5,091	48.3%
Total votes		10,547	100.00%
Democratic hold			

=== District 57 ===
2016 Connecticut State House of Representatives election, District 57
Party	Candidate	Votes	%
Republican	Christopher Davis (Incumbent)	9,048	100%
Total votes		9,048	100.00%
Republican hold			

=== District 58 ===
2016 Connecticut State House of Representatives election, District 58
Party	Candidate	Votes	%
Republican	Greg Stokes	4,707	49.5%
Independent Party	Greg Stokes	388	4.1%
Total	Greg Stokes	5,085	53.6%
Democratic	David J. Alexander	3,987	41.9%
Working Families	David J. Alexander	423	4.5%
Total	David J. Alexander (Incumbent)	4,410	46.4%
Total votes		9,505	100.00%
Republican gain from Democratic			

=== District 59 ===
2016 Connecticut State House of Representatives election, District 59
Party	Candidate	Votes	%
Republican	Carol Hall	4,907	50.1%
Independent Party	Carol Hall	387	4.0%
Total	Carol Hall	5,294	54.1%
Democratic	Anthony DiPace	3,965	40.5%
Working Families	Anthony DiPace	530	5.4%
Total	Anthony DiPace	4,495	45.9%
Total votes		9,789	100.00%
Republican gain from Democratic			

=== District 60 ===
2016 Connecticut State House of Representatives election, District 60
Party	Candidate	Votes	%
Republican	Scott Storms	5,713	49.0%
Independent Party	Scott Storms	516	4.4%
Total	Scott Storms	6,229	53.4%
Democratic	Tim Curtis	5,427	46.6%
Total votes		11,656	100.00%
Republican gain from Democratic			

=== District 61 ===
2016 Connecticut State House of Representatives election, District 61
Party	Candidate	Votes	%
Republican	Tami Zawistowski	7,077	60.6%
Independent Party	Tami Zawistowski	470	4.0%
Total	Tami Zawistowski (Incumbent)	7,547	64.6%
Democratic	Michael Malloy	4,136	35.4%
Total votes		11,683	100.00%
Republican hold			

=== District 62 ===
2016 Connecticut State House of Representatives election, District 62
Party	Candidate	Votes	%
Republican	William Simanski (Incumbent)	10,382	100%
Total votes		10,382	100.00%
Republican hold			

=== District 63 ===
2016 Connecticut State House of Representatives election, District 63
Party	Candidate	Votes	%
Republican	Jay Case	8,103	91.2%
Independent Party	Jay Case	762	8.6%
Total	Jay Case (Incumbent)	8,865	99.8%
Write-In	David G. LaPointe	22	0.2%
Total votes		8,887	100.00%
Republican hold			

=== District 64 ===
2016 Connecticut State House of Representatives election, District 64
Party	Candidate	Votes	%
Republican	Brian Ohler	6,447	52.1%
Independent Party	Brian Ohler	510	4.1%
Total	Brian Ohler	6,957	56.2%
Democratic	William Riiska	5,433	43.8%
Total votes		12,390	100.00%
Republican gain from Democratic			

=== District 65 ===
2016 Connecticut State House of Representatives election, District 65
Party	Candidate	Votes	%
Democratic	Michelle Cook	3,717	44.6%
Working Families	Michelle Cook	557	6.7%
Total	Michelle Cook (Incumbent)	4,274	51.3%
Republican	Todd Schaller	4,061	48.7%
Total votes		8,335	100.00%
Democratic hold			

=== District 66 ===
2016 Connecticut State House of Representatives election, District 66
Party	Candidate	Votes	%
Republican	David Wilson	7,916	58.8%
Democratic	Gayle Carr	5,549	41.2%
Total votes		13,465	100.00%
Republican hold			

=== District 67 ===
2016 Connecticut State House of Representatives election, District 67
Party	Candidate	Votes	%
Republican	Bill Buckbee	5,907	52.60%
Independent Party	Bill Buckbee	632	5.61%
Total	Bill Buckbee	6,539	58.01%
Democratic	Mary Jane Lundgren	4,179	37.08%
Working Families	Mary Jane Lundgren	346	3.07%
Total	Mary Jane Lundgren	4,525	40.15%
Green	Cynthia Day	207	1.84%
Total votes		11,271	100.00%
Republican hold			

=== District 68 ===
2016 Connecticut State House of Representatives election, District 68
Party	Candidate	Votes	%
Republican	Eric Berthel (Incumbent)	9,703	100%
Total votes		9,703	100.00%
Republican hold			

=== District 69 ===
2016 Connecticut State House of Representatives election, District 69
Party	Candidate	Votes	%
Republican	Arthur O'Neill (Incumbent)	9,882	100%
Total votes		9,882	100.00%
Republican hold			

=== District 70 ===
2016 Connecticut State House of Representatives election, District 70
Party	Candidate	Votes	%
Republican	Rosa Rebimbas (Incumbent)	7,232	100%
Total votes		7,232	100.00%
Republican hold			

=== District 71 ===
2016 Connecticut State House of Representatives election, District 71
Party	Candidate	Votes	%
Republican	Anthony D'Amelio (Incumbent)	6,302	79.9%
Independent Party	Danielle Albert	1,588	20.1%
Total votes		7,890	100.00%
Republican hold			

=== District 72 ===
2016 Connecticut State House of Representatives election, District 72
Party	Candidate	Votes	%
Democratic	Larry Butler (Incumbent)	4,117	80.1%
Unaffiliated	Vernon Matthews Jr.	655	12.7%
Unaffiliated	Richard Cam	368	7.2%
Total votes		5,140	100.00%
Democratic hold			

=== District 73 ===
2016 Connecticut State House of Representatives election, District 73
Party	Candidate	Votes	%
Democratic	Jeffrey J. Berger	3,957	47.8%
Working Families	Jeffrey J. Berger	336	4.1%
Total	Jeffrey J. Berger (Incumbent)	4,293	51.9%
Republican	Steven Giacomi	3,605	43.7%
Independent Party	Steven Giacomi	367	4.4%
Total	Steven Giacomi	3,972	48.1%
Total votes		8,265	100.00%
Democratic hold			

=== District 74 ===
2016 Connecticut State House of Representatives election, District 74
Party	Candidate	Votes	%
Republican	Stephanie Cummings	3,819	49.7%
Independent Party	Stephanie Cummings	511	6.6%
Total	Stephanie Cummings	4,330	56.3%
Democratic	Wendy Tyson-Wood	3,365	43.7%
Total votes		7,695	100.00%
Republican hold			

=== District 75 ===
2016 Connecticut State House of Representatives election, District 75
Party	Candidate	Votes	%
Democratic	Geraldo Reyes	3,282	75.2%
Republican	Raymond Work	903	20.7%
Independent Party	Theodore Derouin Jr.	180	4.1%
Total votes		4,365	100.00%
Democratic hold			

=== District 76 ===
2016 Connecticut State House of Representatives election, District 76
Party	Candidate	Votes	%
Republican	John Piscopo (Incumbent)	9,213	70.8%
Democratic	Myrna Watanabe	3,795	29.2%
Total votes		13,008	100.00%
Republican hold			

=== District 77 ===
2016 Connecticut State House of Representatives election, District 77
Party	Candidate	Votes	%
Republican	Cara Christine Pavalock	5,438	49.7%
Independent Party	Cara Christine Pavalock	344	3.1%
Total	Cara Christine Pavalock (Incumbent)	5,782	52.8%
Democratic	Laura Bartok	4,858	44.4%
Working Families	Laura Bartok	311	2.8%
Total	Laura Bartok	5,169	47.2%
Total votes		10,951	100.00%
Republican hold			

=== District 78 ===
2016 Connecticut State House of Representatives election, District 78
Party	Candidate	Votes	%
Republican	Whit Betts	6,659	59.8%
Independent Party	Whit Betts	359	3.2%
Total	Whit Betts (Incumbent)	7,018	63%
Democratic	Krystal Myers	3,704	33.2%
Working Families	Krystal Myers	421	3.8%
Total	Krystal Myers	4,125	37%
Total votes		11,143	100.00%
Republican hold			

=== District 79 ===
2016 Connecticut State House of Representatives election, District 79
Party	Candidate	Votes	%
Democratic	Christopher Ziogas	4,785	54.1%
Republican	Pete Del Mastro	3,798	43.0%
Independent Party	Pete Del Mastro	254	2.9%
Total	Pete Del Mastro	4,252	45.9%
Total votes		8,837	100.00%
Democratic hold			

=== District 80 ===
2016 Connecticut State House of Representatives election, District 80
Party	Candidate	Votes	%
Republican	Robert Sampson	9,403	89.3%
Independent Party	Robert Sampson	1,126	10.7%
Total	Robert Sampson (Incumbent)	10,529	100%
Total votes		10,529	100.00%
Republican hold			

=== District 81 ===
2016 Connecticut State House of Representatives election, District 81
Party	Candidate	Votes	%
Republican	John Fusco	6,659	56.3%
Independent Party	John Fusco	332	2.8%
Total	John Fusco	6,991	59.1%
Democratic	David Zoni	4,386	37.2%
Working Families	David Zoni	443	3.7%
Total	David Zoni (Incumbent)	4,829	40.9%
Total votes		11,820	100.00%
Republican gain from Democratic			

=== District 82 ===
2016 Connecticut State House of Representatives election, District 82
Party	Candidate	Votes	%
Democratic	Emil Altobello (Incumbent)	7,284	100%
Total votes		7,284	100.00%
Democratic hold			

=== District 83 ===
2016 Connecticut State House of Representatives election, District 83
Party	Candidate	Votes	%
Democratic	Catherine Abercrombie (Incumbent)	5,273	50.8%
Republican	Joseph Vollano	5,105	49.2%
Total votes		10,378	100.00%
Democratic hold			

=== District 84 ===
2016 Connecticut State House of Representatives election, District 84
Party	Candidate	Votes	%
Democratic	Hilda Santiago (Incumbent)	4,135	85.9%
Green	Joseph Vollano	678	14.1%
Total votes		4,813	100.00%
Democratic hold			

=== District 85 ===
2016 Connecticut State House of Representatives election, District 85
Party	Candidate	Votes	%
Democratic	Mary Mushinsky	5,005	51.0%
Working Families	Mary Mushinsky	641	6.5%
Total	Mary Mushinsky (Incumbent)	5,646	57.5%
Republican	Serge Mihaly	3,849	39.2%
Independent Party	Serge Mihaly	325	3.3%
Total	Serge Mihaly	4,174	42.5%
Total votes		9,820	100.00%
Democratic hold			

=== District 86 ===
2016 Connecticut State House of Representatives election, District 86
Party	Candidate	Votes	%
Republican	Vincent Candelora	7,761	76.5%
Independent Party	Vincent Candelora	979	9.7%
Total	Vincent Candelora (Incumbent)	8,740	86.2%
Unaffiliated	Vincent Mase	1,403	13.8%
Total votes		10,143	100.00%
Republican hold			

=== District 87 ===
2016 Connecticut State House of Representatives election, District 87
Party	Candidate	Votes	%
Republican	Dave Yaccarino	9,171	69.2%
Independent Party	Dave Yaccarino	755	5.7%
Total	Dave Yaccarino (Incumbent)	9,926	74.9%
Democratic	Steve Gifford	3,331	25.1%
Total votes		13,257	100.00%
Republican hold			

=== District 88 ===
2016 Connecticut State House of Representatives election, District 88
Party	Candidate	Votes	%
Democratic	Josh Elliott	5,919	57.8%
Working Families	Josh Elliott	456	4.4%
Total	Josh Elliott	6,375	62.2%
Republican	Marjorie Bonadies	3,874	37.8%
Total votes		10,249	100.00%
Democratic hold			

=== District 89 ===
2016 Connecticut State House of Representatives election, District 89
Party	Candidate	Votes	%
Republican	Lezlye Zupkus	9,230	88.4%
Independent Party	Lezlye Zupkus	1,216	11.6%
Total	Lezlye Zupkus (Incumbent)	10,446	100%
Total votes		10,446	100.00%
Republican hold			

=== District 90 ===
Held concurrently with a special election for the district. Craig Fishbein was elected in both, flipping the seat in the special election.

2016 Connecticut State House of Representatives election, District 90
Party	Candidate	Votes	%
Republican	Craig Fishbein	6,643	55.8%
Independent Party	Craig Fishbein	408	3.4%
Total	Craig Fishbein	7,051	59.2%
Democratic	Patrick Reynolds	4,860	40.8%
Total votes		11,911	100.00%
Republican gain from Democratic			

=== District 91 ===
2016 Connecticut State House of Representatives election, District 91
Party	Candidate	Votes	%
Democratic	Michael D'Agostino (Incumbent)	8,333	71.2%
Republican	James Lynch	3,377	28.8%
Total votes		11,710	100.00%
Democratic hold			

=== District 92 ===
2016 Connecticut State House of Representatives election, District 92
Party	Candidate	Votes	%
Democratic	Patricia Dillon	7,433	93.6%
Working Families	Patricia Dillon	505	6.4%
Total	Patricia Dillon (Incumbent)	7,938	100%
Total votes		7,938	100.00%
Democratic hold			

=== District 93 ===
2016 Connecticut State House of Representatives election, District 93
Party	Candidate	Votes	%
Democratic	Toni Walker (Incumbent)	6,159	94.6%
Republican	Douglas Losty	351	5.4%
Total votes		6,510	100.00%
Democratic hold			

=== District 94 ===
2016 Connecticut State House of Representatives election, District 94
Party	Candidate	Votes	%
Democratic	Robyn Porter	6,955	93.7%
Working Families	Robyn Porter	471	6.3%
Total	Robyn Porter (Incumbent)	7,426	100%
Total votes		7,426	100.00%
Democratic hold			

=== District 95 ===
2016 Connecticut State House of Representatives election, District 95
Party	Candidate	Votes	%
Democratic	Juan Candelaria (Incumbent)	5,044	100%
Total votes		5,044	100.00%
Democratic hold			

=== District 96 ===
2016 Connecticut State House of Representatives election, District 96
Party	Candidate	Votes	%
Democratic	Roland Lemar	5,271	91.1%
Working Families	Roland Lemar	647	10.9%
Total	Roland Lemar (Incumbent)	5,918	100%
Total votes		5,918	100.00%
Democratic hold			

=== District 97 ===
2016 Connecticut State House of Representatives election, District 97
Party	Candidate	Votes	%
Democratic	Alphonse Paolillo	5,717	100%
Total votes		5,717	100.00%
Democratic hold			

=== District 98 ===
2016 Connecticut State House of Representatives election, District 98
Party	Candidate	Votes	%
Democratic	Sean Scanlon	9,225	87.04%
Working Families	Sean Scanlon	1,374	12.96%
Total	Sean Scanlon (Incumbent)	10,599	100%
Total votes		10,599	100.00%
Democratic hold			

=== District 99 ===
2016 Connecticut State House of Representatives election, District 99
Party	Candidate	Votes	%
Democratic	James Albis	4,565	45.7%
Working Families	James Albis	441	4.4%
Total	James Albis (Incumbent)	5,006	50.1%
Republican	"Big" Steve Tracey	4,653	46.5%
Independent Party	"Big" Steve Tracey	342	3.4%
Total	"Big" Steve Tracey	4,995	49.9%
Total votes		10,001	100.00%
Democratic hold			

=== District 100 ===
2016 Connecticut State House of Representatives election, District 100
Party	Candidate	Votes	%
Democratic	Matt Lesser	6,417	62.6%
Working Families	Matt Lesser	696	6.8%
Total	Matt Lesser (Incumbent)	7,413	69.4%
Republican	Anthony Moran	3,136	30.6%
Total votes		10,249	100.00%
Democratic hold			

=== District 101 ===
2016 Connecticut State House of Representatives election, District 101
Party	Candidate	Votes	%
Republican	Noreen Kokoruda	8,832	96.8%
Independent Party	Noreen Kokoruda	1,348	13.2%
Total	Noreen Kokoruda (Incumbent)	10,180	100%
Total votes		10,180	100.00%
Republican hold			

=== District 102 ===
2016 Connecticut State House of Representatives election, District 102
Party	Candidate	Votes	%
Democratic	Lonnie Reed (Incumbent)	6,878	57.6%
Republican	Christopher Kelly	5,068	42.4%
Total votes		11,946	100.00%
Democratic hold			

=== District 103 ===
2016 Connecticut State House of Representatives election, District 103
Party	Candidate	Votes	%
Democratic	Liz Linehan	5,637	50.4%
Republican	Andrew Falvey	5,340	47.7%
Independent Party	Andrew Falvey	212	1.9%
Total	Andrew Falvey	5,552	49.6%
Total votes		11,189	100.00%
Democratic gain from Republican			

=== District 104 ===
2016 Connecticut State House of Representatives election, District 104
Party	Candidate	Votes	%
Democratic	Linda Gentile	4,341	50.8%
Working Families	Linda Gentile	539	6.3%
Total	Linda Gentile (Incumbent)	4,880	57.1%
Republican	Joseph Jaunmann	3,430	40.1%
Independent Party	Joseph Jaunmann	243	2.8%
Total	Joseph Jaunmann	3,673	42.9%
Total votes		8,553	100.00%
Democratic hold			

=== District 105 ===
2016 Connecticut State House of Representatives election, District 105
Party	Candidate	Votes	%
Republican	Nicole Klarides-Ditria	6,491	53.9%
Independent Party	Nicole Klarides-Ditria	405	3.4%
Total	Nicole Klarides-Ditria	6,896	57.3%
Democratic	Theresa Conroy	4,568	37.9%
Working Families	Theresa Conroy	576	4.8%
Total	Theresa Conroy (Incumbent)	5,144	42.7%
Total votes		12,040	100.00%
Republican gain from Democratic			

=== District 106 ===
2016 Connecticut State House of Representatives election, District 106
Party	Candidate	Votes	%
Republican	Mitch Bolinsky	6,871	54.9%
Independent Party	Mitch Bolinsky	314	2.5%
Total	Mitch Bolinsky (Incumbent)	7,185	57.4%
Democratic	Eva Zimmerman	4,918	39.4%
Working Families	Eva Zimmerman	405	3.2%
Total	Eva Zimmerman	5,323	42.6%
Total votes		12,508	100.00%
Republican hold			

=== District 107 ===
2016 Connecticut State House of Representatives election, District 107
Party	Candidate	Votes	%
Republican	Stephen G. Harding	8,818	86.4%
Independent Party	Stephen G. Harding	1,389	13.6%
Total	Stephen G. Harding (Incumbent)	10,207	100%
Total votes		10,207	100.00%
Republican hold			

=== District 108 ===
2016 Connecticut State House of Representatives election, District 108
Party	Candidate	Votes	%
Republican	Richard A. Smith (Incumbent)	8,133	100%
Total votes		8,133	100.00%
Republican hold			

=== District 109 ===
2016 Connecticut State House of Representatives election, District 109
Party	Candidate	Votes	%
Democratic	David Arconti	4,830	58.2%
Working Families	David Arconti	490	6.0%
Total	David Arconti (Incumbent)	5,320	65.2%
Republican	V. Roeun	2,683	32.9%
Independent Party	V. Roeun	152	1.9%
Total	V. Roeun	2,835	34.8%
Total votes		8,155	100.00%
Democratic hold			

=== District 110 ===
2016 Connecticut State House of Representatives election, District 110
Party	Candidate	Votes	%
Democratic	Bob Godfrey	3,265	58.0%
Working Families	Bob Godfrey	249	4.4%
Total	Bob Godfrey (Incumbent)	3,514	62.4%
Republican	Emanuela Palmares	1,817	32.2%
Independent Party	Emanuela Palmares	302	5.4%
Total	Emanuela Palmares	2,109	37.6%
Total votes		5,633	100.00%
Democratic hold			

=== District 111 ===
2016 Connecticut State House of Representatives election, District 111
Party	Candidate	Votes	%
Republican	John H. Frey (Incumbent)	8,435	62.8%
Democratic	Joe Dowdell	4,991	37.2%
Total votes		13,426	100.00%
Republican hold			

=== District 112 ===
2016 Connecticut State House of Representatives election, District 112
Party	Candidate	Votes	%
Republican	J.P. Sredzinski	8,568	87.8%
Independent Party	J.P. Sredzinski	1,185	12.2%
Total	J.P. Sredzinski (Incumbent)	9,753	100%
Total votes		9,753	100.00%
Republican hold			

=== District 113 ===
2016 Connecticut State House of Representatives election, District 113
Party	Candidate	Votes	%
Republican	Jason Perillo (Incumbent)	8,090	72.8%
Democratic	Adam M. Heller	3,017	27.2%
Total votes		11,107	100.00%
Republican hold			

=== District 114 ===
2016 Connecticut State House of Representatives election, District 114
Party	Candidate	Votes	%
Republican	Themis Klarides	8,066	76.3%
Independent Party	Themis Klarides	927	8.8%
Total	Themis Klarides (Incumbent)	8,993	85.1%
Working Families	Aldon Hynes	1,569	14.9%
Total votes		10,562	100.00%
Republican hold			

=== District 115 ===
2016 Connecticut State House of Representatives election, District 115
Party	Candidate	Votes	%
Democratic	Stephen Dargan	5,273	64.4%
Working Families	Stephen Dargan	525	6.4%
Total	Stephen Dargan (Incumbent)	5,798	70.8%
Republican	Bart Chadderton	2,389	29.2%
Total votes		8,187	100.00%
Democratic hold			

=== District 116 ===
2016 Connecticut State House of Representatives election, District 116
Party	Candidate	Votes	%
Democratic	Michael DiMassa	4,496	70.2%
Working Families	Michael DiMassa	203	3.2%
Total	Michael DiMassa	4,699	73.4%
Republican	Richard DePalma	1,704	25.6%
Total votes		6,403	100.00%
Democratic hold			

=== District 117 ===
2016 Connecticut State House of Representatives election, District 117
Party	Candidate	Votes	%
Republican	Charles Ferraro	6,325	53.1%
Independent Party	Charles Ferraro	421	3.5%
Total	Charles Ferraro (Incumbent)	6,746	56.6%
Democratic	Sean Ronan	4,861	40.7%
Working Families	Sean Ronan	316	2.7%
Total	Sean Ronan	5,177	43.4%
Total votes		11,923	100.00%
Republican hold			

=== District 118 ===
2016 Connecticut State House of Representatives election, District 118
Party	Candidate	Votes	%
Democratic	Kim Rose	5,700	51.0%
Independent Party	Kim Rose	384	3.4%
Working Families	Kim Rose	363	3.3%
Total	Kim Rose (Incumbent)	6,447	57.7%
Republican	Rick Varrone	4,731	42.3%
Total votes		11,178	100.00%
Democratic hold			

=== District 119 ===
2016 Connecticut State House of Representatives election, District 119
Party	Candidate	Votes	%
Republican	Pam Staneski (Incumbent)	7,538	59.0%
Democratic	Ben Gettinger	4,814	37.7%
Working Families	Ben Gettinger	417	3.3%
Total	Ben Gettinger	5,231	41.0%
Total votes		12,769	100.00%
Republican hold			

=== District 120 ===
2016 Connecticut State House of Representatives election, District 120
Party	Candidate	Votes	%
Republican	Laura Hoydick	7,041	58.5%
Independent Party	Laura Hoydick	470	3.9%
Total	Laura Hoydick (Incumbent)	7,511	62.4%
Democratic	Frederick Streets	4,470	37.1%
Unaffiliated	Clifton Price	62	0.5%
Total votes		12,043	100.00%
Republican hold			

=== District 121 ===
2016 Connecticut State House of Representatives election, District 121
Party	Candidate	Votes	%
Democratic	Joseph Gresko (Incumbent)	7,010	100%
Total votes		7,010	100.00%
Democratic hold			

=== District 122 ===
2016 Connecticut State House of Representatives election, District 122
Party	Candidate	Votes	%
Republican	Ben McGorty (Incumbent)	8,996	86.2%
Green	Angela Capinera	1,440	13.8%
Total votes		10,436	100.00%
Republican hold			

=== District 123 ===
2016 Connecticut State House of Representatives election, District 123
Party	Candidate	Votes	%
Republican	David Rutigliano	7,373	58.7%
Independent Party	David Rutigliano	354	2.8%
Total	David Rutigliano (Incumbent)	7,727	61.5%
Democratic	Lino Costantini	4,847	38.6%
Total votes		12,574	100.00%
Republican hold			

=== District 124 ===
2016 Connecticut State House of Representatives election, District 124
Party	Candidate	Votes	%
Democratic	Andre Baker (Incumbent)	5,301	89.7%
Republican	Jose Quiroga	607	10.3%
Total votes		5,908	100.00%
Democratic hold			

=== District 125 ===
2016 Connecticut State House of Representatives election, District 125
Party	Candidate	Votes	%
Republican	Tom O'Dea (Incumbent)	9,261	87.8%
Green	Jose Quiroga	1,288	12.2%
Total votes		10,549	100.00%
Republican hold			

=== District 126 ===
2016 Connecticut State House of Representatives election, District 126
Party	Candidate	Votes	%
Democratic	Charlie Stallworth (Incumbent)	6,335	83.3%
Republican	Anthony Pizighelli	1,266	16.7%
Total votes		7,601	100.00%
Democratic hold			

=== District 127 ===
2016 Connecticut State House of Representatives election, District 127
Party	Candidate	Votes	%
Democratic	Jack Hennessy	4,853	72.7%
Working Families	Jack Hennessy	256	3.8%
Total	Jack Hennessy (Incumbent)	5,109	76.5%
Republican	Ruben Coriano	1,573	23.5%
Total votes		6,682	100.00%
Democratic hold			

=== District 128 ===
2016 Connecticut State House of Representatives election, District 128
Party	Candidate	Votes	%
Democratic	Christopher Rosario (Incumbent)	3,535	86.4%
Republican	Ethan Book	557	13.6%
Total votes		4,092	100.00%
Democratic hold			

=== District 129 ===
2016 Connecticut State House of Representatives election, District 129
Party	Candidate	Votes	%
Democratic	Steven Stafstrom (Incumbent)	5,181	79.4%
Republican	Peter Perillo	1,347	20.6%
Total votes		6,528	100.00%
Democratic hold			

=== District 130 ===
2016 Connecticut State House of Representatives election, District 130
Party	Candidate	Votes	%
Democratic	Ezequiel Santiago (Incumbent)	4,032	87.9%
Republican	Melissa Borres	555	12.1%
Total votes		4,587	100.00%
Democratic hold			

=== District 131 ===
2016 Connecticut State House of Representatives election, District 131
Party	Candidate	Votes	%
Republican	David Labriola (Incumbent)	8,073	68.5%
Democratic	Melissa Borres	3,716	31.5%
Total votes		11,789	100.00%
Republican hold			

=== District 132 ===
2016 Connecticut State House of Representatives election, District 132
Party	Candidate	Votes	%
Republican	Brenda Kupchick	7,586	57.0%
Independent Party	Brenda Kupchick	398	3.0%
Total	Brenda Kupchick (Incumbent)	7,984	60.0%
Democratic	Dru Georgiadis	5,330	40.0%
Total votes		13,314	100.00%
Republican hold			

=== District 133 ===
2016 Connecticut State House of Representatives election, District 133
Party	Candidate	Votes	%
Democratic	Cristin McCarthy Vahey	6,022	55.6%
Working Families	Cristin McCarthy Vahey	380	3.5%
Total	Cristin McCarthy Vahey (Incumbent)	6,402	59.1%
Republican	Raymond Neuberger	4,194	38.7%
Independent Party	Raymond Neuberger	234	2.2%
Total	Raymond Neuberger	4,428	40.9%
Total votes		10,830	100.00%
Democratic hold			

=== District 134 ===
2016 Connecticut State House of Representatives election, District 134
Party	Candidate	Votes	%
Republican	Laura Devlin	7,070	57.8%
Independent Party	Laura Devlin	307	2.5%
Total	Laura Devlin (Incumbent)	7,377	60.3%
Democratic	Frederick Garrity Jr.	4,849	39.7%
Total votes		12,226	100.00%
Republican hold			

=== District 135 ===
2016 Connecticut State House of Representatives election, District 135
Party	Candidate	Votes	%
Republican	Adam Dunsby	6,934	49.4%
Independent Party	Adam Dunsby	252	1.9%
Total	Adam Dunsby	7,186	53.3%
Democratic	Bonnie Troy	6,001	44.5%
Green	Bonnie Troy	300	2.2%
Total	Bonnie Troy	6,301	46.7%
Total votes		13,487	100.00%
Republican hold			

=== District 136 ===
2016 Connecticut State House of Representatives election, District 136
Party	Candidate	Votes	%
Democratic	Jonathan Steinberg (Incumbent)	8,029	57.7%
Republican	Catherine Walsh	5,601	40.2%
Independent Party	Catherine Walsh	294	2.1%
Total	Catherine Walsh	5,895	42.3%
Total votes		13,924	100.00%
Democratic hold			

=== District 137 ===
2016 Connecticut State House of Representatives election, District 137
Party	Candidate	Votes	%
Democratic	Chris Perone	6,437	63.9%
Working Families	Chris Perone	340	3.4%
Total	Chris Perone (Incumbent)	6,777	67.3%
Republican	Darline Perpignan	3,014	29.9%
Independent Party	Darline Perpignan	282	2.8%
Total	Darline Perpignan	3,296	32.7%
Total votes		10,073	100.00%
Democratic hold			

=== District 138 ===
2016 Connecticut State House of Representatives election, District 138
Party	Candidate	Votes	%
Republican	Michael Ferguson	5,738	52.2%
Independent Party	Michael Ferguson	197	1.8%
Total	Michael Ferguson	5,936	54.0%
Democratic	Jeff Tomchik	4,854	44.2%
Working Families	Jeff Tomchik	197	1.8%
Total	Jeff Tomchik	5,052	46.0%
Total votes		10,986	100.00%
Republican hold			

=== District 139 ===
2016 Connecticut State House of Representatives election, District 139
Party	Candidate	Votes	%
Democratic	Kevin Ryan	4,928	53.8%
Working Families	Kevin Ryan	824	9.0%
Total	Kevin Ryan (Incumbent)	5,752	62.8%
Republican	Joseph Mark C. Taraya	3,413	37.2%
Total votes		9,165	100.00%
Democratic hold			

=== District 140 ===
2016 Connecticut State House of Representatives election, District 140
Party	Candidate	Votes	%
Democratic	Bruce V. Morris	5,178	90.7%
Working Families	Bruce V. Morris	532	9.3%
Total	Bruce V. Morris (Incumbent)	5,710	100%
Total votes		5,710	100.00%
Democratic hold			

=== District 141 ===
2016 Connecticut State House of Representatives election, District 141
Party	Candidate	Votes	%
Republican	Terrie Wood	8,409	66.2%
Independent Party	Terrie Wood	300	2.4%
Total	Terrie Wood (Incumbent)	8,709	68.6%
Democratic	Randy Klein	3,979	31.4%
Total votes		12,688	100.00%
Republican hold			

=== District 142 ===
2016 Connecticut State House of Representatives election, District 142
Party	Candidate	Votes	%
Republican	Fred Wilms	6,606	71.7%
Independent Party	Fred Wilms	871	9.5%
Total	Fred Wilms (Incumbent)	7,477	81.2%
Working Families	Randy Klein	1,736	18.8%
Total votes		9,213	100.00%
Republican hold			

=== District 143 ===
2016 Connecticut State House of Representatives election, District 143
Party	Candidate	Votes	%
Republican	Gail Lavielle (Incumbent)	9,457	100%
Total votes		9,457	100.00%
Republican hold			

=== District 144 ===
2016 Connecticut State House of Representatives election, District 144
Party	Candidate	Votes	%
Democratic	Caroline Simmons (Incumbent)	7,441	67%
Republican	Steven Bartolo Kolenberg	3,479	31.4%
Independent Party	Steven Bartolo Kolenberg	180	1.6%
Total	Steven Bartolo Kolenberg	3,659	33%
Total votes		11,100	100.00%
Democratic hold			

=== District 145 ===
2016 Connecticut State House of Representatives election, District 145
Party	Candidate	Votes	%
Democratic	Patricia Billie Miller (Incumbent)	5,203	81.0%
Republican	Francky Trofort	1,125	17.5%
Independent Party	Francky Trofort	95	1.5%
Total	Francky Trofort	1,220	19.0%
Total votes		6,423	100.00%
Democratic hold			

=== District 146 ===
2016 Connecticut State House of Representatives election, District 146
Party	Candidate	Votes	%
Democratic	Terry B. Adams (Incumbent)	6,279	68.6%
Republican	Arkadiusz Jakubowski	2,869	31.4%
Total votes		9,148	100.00%
Democratic hold			

=== District 147 ===
2016 Connecticut State House of Representatives election, District 147
Party	Candidate	Votes	%
Democratic	William Tong (Incumbent)	8,258	100%
Total votes		8,258	100.00%
Democratic hold			

=== District 148 ===
2016 Connecticut State House of Representatives election, District 148
Party	Candidate	Votes	%
Democratic	Daniel J. Fox (Incumbent)	5,727	71.45%
Republican	Phil Balestriere	2,134	26.62%
Green	Brian Merlen	155	1.93%
Total votes		8,016	100.00%
Democratic hold			

=== District 149 ===
2016 Connecticut State House of Representatives election, District 149
Party	Candidate	Votes	%
Republican	Livvy Floren (Incumbent)	8,949	100%
Total votes		8,949	100.00%
Republican hold			

=== District 150 ===
2016 Connecticut State House of Representatives election, District 150
Party	Candidate	Votes	%
Republican	Mike Bocchino (Incumbent)	6,769	100%
Total votes		6,769	100.00%
Republican hold			

=== District 151 ===
2016 Connecticut State House of Representatives election, District 151
Party	Candidate	Votes	%
Republican	Fred Camillo (Incumbent)	7,321	60.3%
Democratic	Dita Bhargava	4,812	39.7%
Total votes		12,133	100.00%
Republican hold			
