= David Anderson (Connecticut politician) =

American politician (1925–2023)

Member of the Connecticut House of Representatives from the 45th district
- In office 1981–1993
- Preceded by: Dorothy Faulise
- Succeeded by: Steve Mikutel

Personal details
- Born: November 28, 1925 New York City, U.S.
- Died: June 11, 2023 (aged 97)
- Party: Republican

David Anderson (November 28, 1925 – June 11, 2023) was an American politician. He served as a Republican member for the 45th district of the Connecticut House of Representatives.
