= Clark Chapin =

American politician

Member of the Connecticut Senate from the 30th district
- In office 2013–2017
- Preceded by: Andrew Roraback
- Succeeded by: Craig Miner

Member of the Connecticut House of Representatives from the 67th district
- In office 2001–2013
- Preceded by: Jeanne Garvey
- Succeeded by: Cecilia Buck-Taylor

Personal details
- Party: Republican

Clark Chapin is an American politician from Connecticut. A Republican, Chapin was a member of the Connecticut House of Representatives from 2001 to 2013, representing the 67th district, and a member of the State Senate from 2013 to 2017, representing the 30th district.

Chapin earned his B.S. in animal science and technology from the University of Rhode Island and recently earned his M.S. in community development from Iowa State University.

== See also ==
- Connecticut Senate
