= Brian Lanoue =

American politician

Member of the Connecticut House of Representatives from the 45th district
- Incumbent
- Assumed office January 9, 2019
- Preceded by: Kevin Skulczyck

Personal details
- Born: January 29, 1982 (age 44)
- Party: Republican
- Education: Eastern Connecticut State University (BS); Southern Connecticut State University (MPP)

Brian Lanoue (born January 29, 1982) is an American politician. A member of the Republican Party, he has served in the Connecticut House of Representatives from the 45th district since 2019.

== Education ==
Lanoue received his bachelor’s degree in political science from Eastern Connecticut State University. He later attended Southern Connecticut State University, where he received a master's in public policy.

== Connecticut House of Representatives ==
Lanoue ran for office for the first time in 2018, where he stood to represent the 45th district in the Connecticut House of Representatives after incumbent Republican Kevin Skulczyck retired. In the general election, he defeated Democrat Steve Mikutel, who had previously held the seat from 1993 to 2015. He was reelected in the 2020 and 2022 elections.
