= Jutila =

Jutila is a Finnish surname. Notable people with the surname include:

- Ed Jutila (born 1955), American former politician
- Kalle Jutila (1891–1966), Finnish agronomist, politician and diplomat
- Matti Jutila (1943–2026), Finnish mathematician and professor at the University of Turku
- Matti Jutila (wrestler) (1932–2025), Finnish-born Canadian wrestler
- Timo Jutila (born 1963), Finnish ice hockey defenceman
