= Connecticut General Assembly Conservative Caucus =

- Chairman: Mike France
- Vice Chairman: Craig C. Fishbein
- Secretary: Anne Dauphinais
- Treasurer: David T. Wilson
- Founded: 2017; 9 years ago
- Ideology: Limited Government; Economic Freedom; Individual liberty
- Seats in the Legislature: 12 / 185

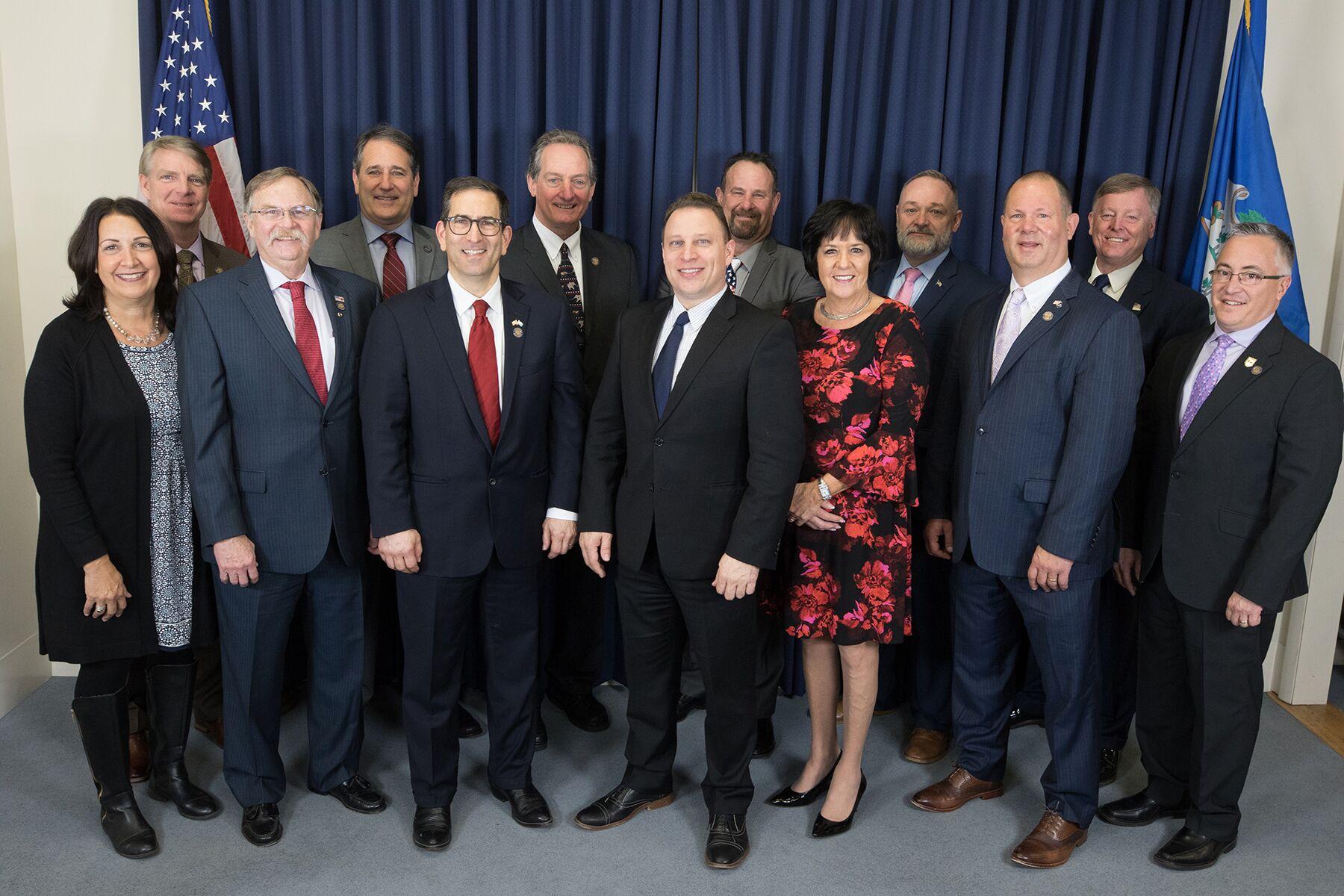
Membership of CT General Assembly Conservative Caucus, January 2019

The Connecticut General Assembly Conservative Caucus is a group of Connecticut legislators espousing a conservative political agenda.

== Members ==
The members of the Connecticut General Assembly Conservative Caucus are:

- Mike France, Chairman (R-42), who serves as the Ranking Member on the Government Administration & Elections Committee, and also serves on the Appropriations, and Planning & Development Committee(s).
- Craig C. Fishbein, Vice Chairman (R-90), who serves on the Judiciary, Labor & Public Sector Employees, and Public Safety Committee(s).
- Anne Dauphinais, Secretary (R-44), who serves as the Ranking Member on the Housing Committee, and also serves on the Appropriations, and the Public Safety Committee(s).
- David T. Wilson, Treasurer (R-66), who serves as the Ranking Member on the Aging Committee, and also serves on the Appropriations, and the Environment Committee(s).
- Tim Ackert (R-8), who serves on the Energy, General Law, Higher Education, and Screening Committee(s).
- Vincent Candelora (R-86), who serves as the Chairman of the Screening Committee, and also serves on the Finance, Public Health, General Law, and Legislative Management Committee(s). Candelora is also a Deputy House Leader, and serves as the Chair of the screening committee that is tasked with reviewing all legislation before it is put up for a vote in the House.
- Doug Dubitsky (R-47), who serves on the Environment, Judiciary, and Planning & Development Committee(s).
- John P. Fusco (R-81), who serves on the Aging, Commerce, and Public Safety Committee(s).
- Rick Hayes (R-51), who serves on the Children, Environment, and Public Safety Committee(s).
- Gale Mastrofrancesco (R-80), who serves on the Appropriations, GAE, Human Services Committee(s).
- John Piscopo (R-76), who serves on the Environment, Energy & Technology, Finance, Legislative Management and Screening Committee(s).
- Kurt Vail (R-52), who is the ranking member on the Veterans Committee, and also serves on the Insurance and Public Safety Committee(s).

== Causes ==
The caucus has actively advocated against illegal immigration, against the re-installation of tolls on Connecticut roadways, against the appointment of Andrew J. McDonald to be the Chief Justice of the Connecticut Supreme Court, as well as for reviving the death penalty. For the 2019 session, their legislative agenda supports bringing back the state's death penalty, making it optional for workers to pay union dues, re-funding an agency that handles gun crimes, and removing the state's support for the National Popular Vote Interstate Compact, which would switch the election of the US President to a popular vote.

== See also ==
- Freedom Caucus
- Libertarian Republican
- Libertarian conservatism
- Republican Liberty Caucus
- Tea Party Caucus
- Tea Party movement
