= Chris DePino =

American politician (born 1952)

Member of the Connecticut House of Representatives from the 97th district
- In office March 1992 – January 3, 2001
- Preceded by: Robert J. Hauser Jr.
- Succeeded by: Robert Megna

Personal details
- Born: July 10, 1952 (age 74) New Haven, Connecticut, U.S.
- Party: Republican

Chris DePino (born July 10, 1952) is an American politician who served in the Connecticut House of Representatives from the 97th district from 1992 to 2001.
