= Karen Reddington-Hughes =

American politician

Karen E. Reddington-Hughes

Member of the Connecticut House of Representatives from the 66th district
- Incumbent
- Assumed office January 4, 2023
- Preceded by: David Wilson

Personal details
- Born: 1963 or 1964
- Party: Republican
- Education: Chestnut Hill College

Karen E. Reddington-Hughes (born c. 1963/1964) is an American politician, who is a Republican member of the Connecticut House of Representatives from District 66 since 2023.
