= David Fritz =

American politician

Member-elect of the Connecticut House of Representatives from the 90th district
- Assuming office January 2027
- Succeeding: Craig Fishbein

Personal details
- Party: Democratic
- Website: Campaign website

David J. Fritz is an American politician. A member of the Democratic Party, he is the member-elect for the 90th district of the Connecticut House of Representatives. He is the son of the late state representative Mary Fritz.
