= Holly Cheeseman =

American politician

Member of the Connecticut House of Representatives from the 37th district
- In office January 4, 2017 – January 8, 2025
- Preceded by: Ed Jutila
- Succeeded by: Nick Menapace

Personal details
- Born: December 31, 1954 (age 71) New London, Connecticut, U.S.
- Party: Republican
- Education: Mount Holyoke College (BA)

Holly Cheeseman (born December 31, 1954) is an American former politician who was elected to the Connecticut House of Representatives for the 37th district 2017 and served until her loss in November 2024.

== Electoral History ==
2024 Connecticut House of Representatives election: District 37
Party	Candidate	Votes	%
Democratic	Nick Menapace	7,735	50.3%
Republican	Holly Cheeseman (incumbent)	7,636	49.7%
Turnout		15,371	100%

2022 Connecticut House of Representatives election: District 37
Party	Candidate	Votes	%
Republican	Holly Cheeseman (incumbent)	6,295	52.1
Democratic	Nick Menapace	5,791	47.9%
Turnout		12,086	100%

2020 Connecticut House of Representatives election: District 37
Party	Candidate	Votes	%
Republican	Holly Cheeseman (incumbent)	7,118	50.7
Democratic	Cate Steel	6,918	49.3%
Turnout		14,036	100%

2018 Connecticut House of Representatives election: District 37
Party	Candidate	Votes	%
Republican	Holly Cheeseman (incumbent)	5,766	51.4
Democratic	Hugh McKenney	5,456	48.6%
Turnout		11,222	100%

2016 Connecticut House of Representatives election: District 37
Party	Candidate	Votes	%
Republican	Holly Cheeseman	6,827	56.1
Democratic	Beth Hogan	5,342	43.9%
Turnout		12,169	100%

2010 Connecticut House of Representatives election: District 37
Party	Candidate	Votes	%
Democratic	Ed Jutila	5,412	59.8
Republican	Holly Cheeseman	3,636	40.2%
Turnout		9,048	100%
