= Wade A. Hyslop Jr. =

American politician

Member of the Connecticut House of Representatives from the 39th district
- In office January 9, 1991 – January 5, 2005
- Preceded by: William J. Cibes Jr.
- Succeeded by: Ernest Hewett

Personal details
- Party: Democratic

Wade A. Hyslop Jr. is an American politician who served in the Connecticut House of Representatives from the 39th district from 1991 to 2005.
