= Connecticut's 105th House of Representatives district =

American legislative district

Connecticut's 105th State House of Representatives district
Representative
Nicole Klarides-Ditria; R

Connecticut's 105th House of Representatives district elects one member of the Connecticut House of Representatives. It consists of the towns of Seymour, Beacon Falls, and parts of Derby. It has been represented by Republican Nicole Klarides-Ditria since 2019.

== List of representatives ==
List of Representatives from Connecticut's 105th House District
Representative	Party	Years	District home	Note
Thomas O'Dea	Democratic	1967–1973	New Haven	Seat created
Raymond A. Shea	Republican	1973–1975	Beacon Falls	
Paul Pawlak Sr.	Democratic	1975–1979	Seymour	
Warren Sarasin	Republican	1979–1985	Beacon Falls	
George P. Bassing	Republican	1985–1987	Seymour	
John W. Betkoski III	Democratic	1987–1999	Beacon Falls	
Len Greene Sr.	Republican	1999–2009	Beacon Falls	
Theresa Conroy	Democratic	2009–2011	Seymour	
Len Greene Jr.	Republican	2011–2013	Seymour	
Theresa Conroy	Democratic	2013–2017	Seymour	
Nicole Klarides-Ditria	Republican	2017–	Seymour	Incumbent

== Recent elections ==
=== 2020 ===
2020 Connecticut State House of Representatives election, District 105
Party	Candidate	Votes	%
Republican	Nicole Klarides-Ditria (incumbent)	8,997	67.13
Democratic	Christopher E. Bowen	4,405	32.87
Total votes		13,402	100.00
Republican hold			

=== 2018 ===
2018 Connecticut House of Representatives election, District 105
Party	Candidate	Votes	%
Republican	Nicole Klarides-Ditria	7,035	67.8
Democratic	Kevin McDuffie	3,346	32.2
Total votes		10,381	100.00
Republican hold			

=== 2016 ===
2016 Connecticut House of Representatives election, District 105
Party	Candidate	Votes	%
Republican	Nicole Klarides-Ditria	6,896	57.28
Democratic	Theresa Conroy (Incumbent)	5,144	42.72
Total votes		12,040	100.00
Republican gain from Democratic			

=== 2014 ===
2014 Connecticut House of Representatives election, District 105
Party	Candidate	Votes	%
Democratic	Theresa Conroy (Incumbent)	4,141	53.7
Republican	Robert Willis	3,149	40.5
Working Families	Theresa Conroy (Incumbent)	449	5.8
Total votes		7,769	100.00
Democratic hold			

=== 2012 ===
2012 Connecticut House of Representatives election, District 105
Party	Candidate	Votes	%
Democratic	Theresa Conroy	5,161	50.4
Republican	Len Greene Jr. (Incumbent)	5,084	49.6
Total votes		10,244	100.00
Democratic gain from Republican			
