= Connecticut's 90th House of Representatives district =

American legislative district

Connecticut's 90th State House of Representatives district
Representative
Craig C. Fishbein; R

Connecticut's 90th House of Representatives district elects one member of the Connecticut House of Representatives. It encompasses Middlefield and parts of Wallingford. It has been represented by Republican Craig C. Fishbein since 2017.

== List of representatives ==
List of Representatives from Connecticut's 90th State House District
Representative	Party	Years	District home	Note
James J. Palmieri	Democratic	1967–1973	Waterbury	Seat created
Richard E. Varis	Republican	1973–1981	Prospect	
Kenneth R. Tripp	Republican	1981–1983	Cheshire	
Mary Fritz	Democratic	1983–1985	Wallingford	
Carleton J. Benson	Republican	1985–1987	Prospect	
Mary Fritz	Democratic	1987–2017	Wallingford	
Craig C. Fishbein	Republican	2017–	Wallingford	
David Fritz	Democratic	2027 member-elect		

== Recent elections ==
=== 2020 ===
2020 Connecticut State House of Representatives election, District 91
Party	Candidate	Votes	%
Republican	Craig C. Fishbein (incumbent)	6,748	47.85
Democratic	Jim Jinks	6,703	47.53
Working Families	Jim Jinks	345	2.45
Independent Party	Craig Fishbein (incumbent)	307	2.18
Total votes		14,103	100.00
Republican hold			

=== 2018 ===
2018 Connecticut House of Representatives election, District 90
Party	Candidate	Votes	%
Republican	Craig C. Fishbein (Incumbent)	5,929	53.5
Democratic	Daniel Fontaine	5,150	46.5
Total votes		11,079	100.00
Republican hold			

=== 2016 ===
2016 Connecticut House of Representatives election, District 90
Party	Candidate	Votes	%
Republican	Craig C. Fishbein	7,051	59.20
Democratic	Patrick Reynolds	4,860	40.80
Total votes		11,911	100.00
Republican hold			

=== 2014 ===
2014 Connecticut House of Representatives election, District 90
Party	Candidate	Votes	%
Democratic	Mary Fritz (Incumbent)	4,829	55.80
Republican	Richard J. Abbate	3,823	44.20
Total votes		8,652	100.00
Democratic hold			

=== 2012 ===
2012 Connecticut House of Representatives election, District 90
Party	Candidate	Votes	%
Democratic	Mary Fritz (Incumbent)	6,672	60.1
Republican	Guy Darter	4,437	39.9
Total votes		11,109	100.00
Democratic hold			
