= Mary Hill (politician) =

American politician (1896–1989)

Member of the Connecticut House of Representatives from the 67th district
- In office 1967–1973
- Preceded by: Seat established
- Succeeded by: Walter J. Conn

Member of the Connecticut House of Representatives from New London
- In office 1959–1967 Serving with Joseph Ottaviano Jr. (1959–1963); Hubert A. Neilan (1963–1967)
- Preceded by: Merrill S. Dreyfus; A. Richard Cushman
- Succeeded by: Seat eliminated

Personal details
- Born: May 24, 1896 Shelburne Falls, Massachusetts, U.S.
- Died: July 10, 1989 (aged 93) New London, Connecticut, U.S.
- Party: Democratic
- Spouse: Braxton W. Hill
- Children: 2

Mary Bertha Hill (May 24, 1896 – July 10, 1989) was an American politician who served in the Connecticut House of Representatives from 1959 to 1973. A Democrat, Hill represented the city of New London from 1959 to 1967, and the 67th district from 1967 to 1973.

== Personal life ==
Hill was born on May 24, 1896, in Shelburne Falls, Massachusetts, to Henry and Alexina Saulnier Mandeville. She was married to Braxton W. Hill and had two daughters.

== Political career ==
A Democrat, Hill was first elected to the Connecticut House of Representatives in 1958, and she served as one of two representatives from the city of New London from 1959 to 1967. She served alongside Joseph Ottaviano Jr. from 1959 to 1963, and Hubert A. Neilan from 1963 to 1967. She had no successors as Connecticut's 1965 redistricting eliminated the use of single-town districts, and when Hill ran for reelection in 1966, it was to the 67th district. Hill was elected and served three terms.

In 1972, Connecticut again redistricted, and Hill unsuccessfully ran for reelection in the 40th district. She was defeated by Republican candidate James McGill.

== Death ==
Hill died on July 10, 1989, at her home in New London, Connecticut. She was 93.
