= Jeanne Garvey =

American politician

Member of the Connecticut House of Representatives from the 67th district
- In office 1993–2001
- Preceded by: Oskar G. Rogg
- Succeeded by: Clark Chapin

Personal details
- Born: Jeanne Wolter
- Party: Republican
- Spouse(s): Henry Garvey Jr. (died 1998) Bill Stax
- Children: 5

Jeanne Garvey Stax (née Wolter) is an American politician who served in the Connecticut House of Representatives from 1993 to 2001, representing the 67th district as a Republican.

== Personal life ==
Garvey was married to Henry Garvey Jr. until his death in 1998. She has five children.

Around 1999, Garvey married her second husband, Bill Stax, a former general manager at Connecticut Light & Power, now a part of Eversource Energy. In 2010, the couple moved from Connecticut to Florida.

== Political career ==
Garvey was first elected to the Connecticut House of Representatives in 1992, and she served four terms representing the 67th district as a Republican. She did not run for reelection in 2000 and was succeeded by fellow Republican Clark Chapin.
