= Dorothy Faulise =

American politician (1929–2018)

Member of the Connecticut House of Representatives from the 45th district
- In office 1975–1981
- Preceded by: Grant B. Apthorp
- Succeeded by: David Anderson

Personal details
- Born: Dorothy Abramchuk; May 12, 1929 New York City, U.S.
- Died: October 2, 2018 (aged 89)
- Party: Democratic
- Spouse(s): John Faulise (m. 1947; died 1975) Earl D. Boone (m. 1977) Vernon Doucette (m. 1994; died 2017)
- Children: 4

Dorothy Faulise Doucette (née Abramchuk; May 12, 1929 – October 2, 2018), also known as Dorothy Faulise-Boone, was an American politician who served in the Connecticut House of Representatives from 1975 to 1981, representing the 45th district as a Democrat.

== Personal life ==
Faulise was born in New York City on May 12, 1929, to Mary and Paul Abramchuk. Both parents were from Galicia, Ukraine. Faulise had two brothers, and the family later moved to Lisbon, Connecticut, where Faulise graduated from the Norwich Free Academy. She married her first husband, John Faulise, on September 27, 1947. They had four children and operated a restaurant in Griswold together. The two were married until John died in 1975. Faulise married her second husband, Earl D. Boone, in 1977. She married her third husband, Vernon Doucette, in 1994, and they were together until Vernon died in 2017.

== Political career ==
Faulise was first elected to the Connecticut House of Representatives in 1974, and she served three terms representing the 45th district as a Democrat. She was a resident of Griswold and Norwich during her tenure. She served on Griswold's board of education.

== Death ==
Faulise died on October 2, 2018. She was 89.
