= Chris Poulos =

American politician

Member of the Connecticut House of Representatives from the 81st district
- Incumbent
- Assumed office January 4, 2023
- Preceded by: John Fusco

Personal details
- Born: 1974 (age 51–52)
- Party: Democrat
- Education: University of Richmond (BA); Columbia University (M.Ed.); University of Connecticut (SYC)

Christopher Poulos (born 1974) is an American educator and politician. A Democrat, he is a member of the Connecticut House of Representatives serving in the 81st district since 2022. He was elected by only one vote. He was re-elected by a wider margin in 2024.

Poulos is a Spanish teacher at Joel Barlow High School in Redding. He was selected as Connecticut Teacher of the Year in 2007.
