= Warren Sarasin =

American politician

Member of the Connecticut House of Representatives from the 105th district
- In office January 3, 1979 – January 9, 1985
- Preceded by: Paul Pawlak Sr.
- Succeeded by: George P. Bassing

Personal details
- Party: Republican

Warren Sarasin is an American politician who served in the Connecticut House of Representatives from the 105th district from 1979 to 1985.
