= Bruce Zalaski =

American politician

Member of the Connecticut House of Representatives from the 81st district
- In office January 8, 2003 – January 9, 2013
- Preceded by: Chris Murphy
- Succeeded by: David Zoni

Personal details
- Born: December 30, 1950 (age 75) Southington, Connecticut, U.S.
- Party: Democratic
- Education: Northwestern Connecticut Community College (AS)

Bruce Zalaski (born December 30, 1950) is an American politician who served in the Connecticut House of Representatives from the 81st district from 2003 to 2013.
