= Lillian Erb =

American politician (1922–2008)

Member of the Connecticut House of Representatives from the 66th district
- In office 1967–1973
- Preceded by: Seat established
- Succeeded by: Harold G. Harlow

Member of the Connecticut House of Representatives from Groton
- In office 1963–1967 Serving with Frederick A. Little
- Preceded by: Reginald H. Wood; Frederick A. Little
- Succeeded by: Seat eliminated

Personal details
- Born: Lillian Edgar; July 28, 1922 Stonington, Connecticut, U.S.
- Died: December 17, 2008 (aged 86)
- Party: Republican
- Spouse: David "Ray" Erb (m. 1942)
- Children: 3
- Education: Eastern Connecticut State University

Lillian Edgar Erb (July 28, 1922 – December 17, 2008) was an American politician who served in the Connecticut House of Representatives. From 1963 to 1967, she represented the town of Groton, and from 1967 to 1973, the 66th district.

== Personal life ==
Lillian Edgar was born on July 28, 1922, in Stonington, Connecticut, and graduated from Stonington High School. She married David "Ray" Charles Erb on January 28, 1942. They moved to Noank in 1943, and they had three children. Ray served in World War II and subsequently worked for 50 years as a draftsman with the Electric Boat Company. He died in 2016, aged 94.

Although Lillian had hoped to attend college after high school, she had to work instead due to Ray's military service. During the war, she worked for Colt Firearms, where she assembled and inspected machine guns. In the late 1960s and early 70s, she attended the University of Connecticut. In 1999, Erb graduated from Eastern Connecticut State University with a bachelor's degree in public policy and government. At age 76, she was the oldest student at her graduation.

== Career ==
Erb in 1970

A Republican, Erb was first elected to the Connecticut House of Representatives in 1962 to represent the town of Groton alongside fellow Republican Frederick A. Little. Though only formally elected to one term of two years, Erb and Little remained in their seats until 1967 due to redistricting efforts. Connecticut's apportionment was ruled unconstitutional in 1964, and the legislature was ordered to replace its single-town districts before holding another state election. A subsequent impasse in the redistricting led to the legislature elected in 1962 remaining in office until January 1967, as another election was not held until November 1966.

Erb ran to represent the newly created 66th district in 1966. She was elected and served three terms. Erb did not run for reelection in 1972 and was succeeded by Harold G. Harlow in 1973.

In 1971, Erb ran for judge of probate in Groton. She was elected and served until her retirement in 1986.

Erb was a delegate to the 1972 Republican National Convention.

== Death ==
Erb died on December 17, 2008, at age 86.
