= Anthony Nolan (politician) =

American politician and retired law enforcement officer

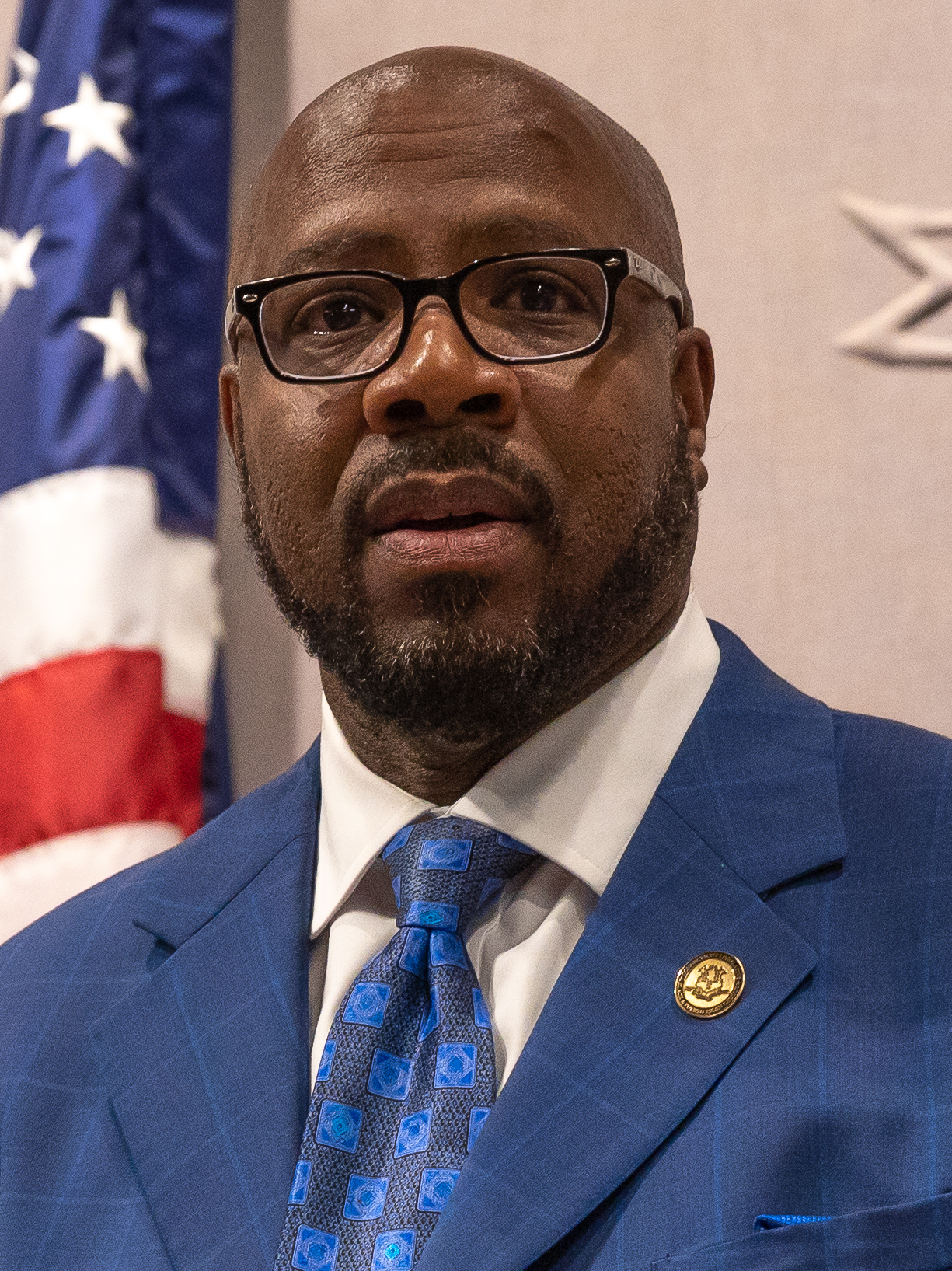
- Nolan in 2023

Member of the Connecticut House of Representatives from the 39th district
- Incumbent
- Assumed office March 1, 2021
- Preceded by: Chris Soto

Personal details
- Born: c. 1970 (age c. 54)
- Party: Democratic

Military service
- Allegiance: United States
- Branch/service: United States Navy
- Years of service: 1990–1998

Anthony L. Nolan (born c. 1970) is an American politician and retired law enforcement officer serving as a member of the Connecticut House of Representatives for the 39th district. He assumed office on March 1, 2019.

== Career ==
Nolan served in the United States Navy from 1990 to 1998, including as a dental technician and dental surgery technician. From 2000-2023, he worked as a peace officer with the New London Police Department. He served as a member of the New London City Council from 2012 to 2019 and as council president from 2016 to 2019. Nolan was elected to the Connecticut House of Representatives on March 1, 2019. He is the House chair of the Veterans' and Military Affairs Committee.
