= Len Greene Jr. =

American politician

Leonard Greene Jr. is an American Republican Party politician who served as a member of the Connecticut House of Representatives from the 105th district, which consists of the towns Beacon Falls, Seymour, and parts of Derby, from 2011 to 2013. Greene was first elected to the House in 2010 over Theresa Conroy, would later defeat him in 2012. Greene served as a selectman of the town of Seymour until 2018, when him and his family moved to Bethel, Connecticut.
