= Connecticut's 37th House of Representatives district =

American legislative district

Connecticut's 37th State House of Representatives district
Representative
Nick Menapace; D

Connecticut's 37th House of Representatives district elects one member of the Connecticut House of Representatives. It consists of the towns of East Lyme and part of the towns of Salem and Montville. It has been represented by Democrat Nick Menapace since 2025.

== List of representatives ==
List of Representatives from Connecticut's 37th State House District
Representative	Party	Years	District home	Note
Edgar A. King	Republican	1967–1973	Farmington	Seat created
Richard H. Wagner	Republican	1973–1975	Niantic	
Robert D. Tobin	Democratic	1975–1977	Niantic	
Kenneth A. Leary	Democratic	1977–1981	Niantic	
Mark Healey Powers	Democratic	1981–1987	Niantic	
John T. Hoye	Democratic	1987–1991	East Lyme	
Fred Lundfelt	Republican	1991–1993	Niantic	
Gary Orefice	Democratic	1993–2005	Niantic	
Ed Jutila	Democratic	2005–2017	Niantic	
Holly Cheeseman	Republican	2017–2025	Niantic	
Nick Menapace	Democratic	2025–	Niantic	

== Recent elections ==
=== 2024 ===
2024 Connecticut House of Representatives election, District 37
Party	Candidate	Votes	%
Democratic	Nick Menapace	7,405	48.18
Republican	Holly Cheeseman (incumbent)	7,302	47.51
Working Families	Nick Menapace	330	2.15
Independent Party	Holly Cheeseman (incumbent)	334	2.17
Total votes		15,371	100.00
Democratic gain from			

=== 2022 ===
2022 Connecticut State House of Representatives election, District 37
Party	Candidate	Votes	%
Republican	Holly Cheeseman (incumbent)	6,134	50.75
Democratic	Nick Menapace	5,657	46.81
Independent Party	Holly Cheeseman (incumbent)	161	1.33
Working Families	Nick Menapace	134	1.11
Total votes		12,086	100.00
Republican hold			

=== 2020 ===
2020 Connecticut State House of Representatives election, District 37
Party	Candidate	Votes	%
Republican	Holly Cheeseman (incumbent)	6,800	48.45
Democratic	Cate Steel	6,699	47.73
Independent Party	Holly Cheeseman (incumbent)	318	2.27
Working Families	Cate Steel	219	1.56
Total votes		14,036	100.00
Republican hold			

=== 2018 ===
2018 Connecticut House of Representatives election, District 37
Party	Candidate	Votes	%
Republican	Holly Cheeseman (Incumbent)	5,766	51.4
Democratic	Hugh McKenny	5,456	48.6
Total votes		11,222	100.00
Republican hold			

=== 2016 ===
2016 Connecticut House of Representatives election, District 37
Party	Candidate	Votes	%
Republican	Holly Cheeseman	6,827	56.10
Democratic	Beth Hogan	5,342	43.90
Total votes		12,169	100.00
Republican gain from Democratic			

=== 2014 ===
2014 Connecticut House of Representatives election, District 37
Party	Candidate	Votes	%
Democratic	Ed Jutila (Incumbent)	5,826	66.9
Republican	Elbert M. Burr	2,881	33.1
Total votes		8,707	100.00
Democratic hold			

=== 2012 ===
2012 Connecticut House of Representatives election, District 37
Party	Candidate	Votes	%
Democratic	Ed Jutila (incumbent)	8,971	100.0
Democratic hold			
