= Nick Menapace =

American politician

Member of the Connecticut House of Representatives from the 37th district
- Incumbent
- Assumed office January 8, 2025
- Preceded by: Holly Cheeseman

Personal details
- Born: August 31, 1989 (age 37)
- Party: Democratic
- Education: Central Connecticut State University
- Website: https://www.menapaceforct.com/

Nick Menapace (born 31 August 1989) is an American politician and member of the Connecticut House of Representatives since 2025 from the 37th district, which contains the town of East Lyme and part of the towns of Salem and Montville. He worked as a middle school social studies teacher in Norwich.

== Electoral History ==
2024 Connecticut House of Representatives election: District 37
Party	Candidate	Votes	%
Democratic	Nick Menapace	7,735	50.3%
Republican	Holly Cheeseman (incumbent)	7,636	49.7%
Turnout		15,371	100%

2022 Connecticut House of Representatives election: District 37
Party	Candidate	Votes	%
Republican	Holly Cheeseman (incumbent)	6,295	52.1
Democratic	Nick Menapace	5,791	47.9%
Turnout		12,086	100%
