= Connecticut's 39th House of Representatives district =

American legislative district

Connecticut's 39th State House of Representatives district
Representative
Anthony Nolan; D

Connecticut's 39th House of Representatives district elects one member of the Connecticut House of Representatives. Its current representative is Democrat Anthony Nolan. The district consists of part of the city of New London, which is divided between the 39th and 40th districts.

== List of representatives ==
List of Representatives from Connecticut's 39th State House District
Representative	Party	Years	District home	Note
Russell L. Stecker	Republican	1967–1971	Simsbury	Seat created
Virginia Connolly	Republican	1971–1973	West Simsbury	
Paul H. Sullivan	Democratic	1973–1975	New London	
Richard R. Martin	Democratic	1975–1979	New London	
William J. Cibes Jr.	Democratic	1979–1991	New London	
Wade A. Hyslop Jr.	Democratic	1991–2005	New London	
Ernest Hewett	Democratic	2005–2017	New London	
Chris Soto	Democratic	2017–2019	New London	
Anthony Nolan	Democratic	2019–	New London	Won special election

== Recent elections ==
State Election 2008: House District 39
Party	Candidate	Votes	%	±%
Democratic	Ernest Hewett	3,948	63.9	−1.6
Republican	Jason Catala	1,109	17.9	−11.2
Working Families	Ernest Hewett	594	9.6	+4.2
Green	Kenric M. Hanson	529	8.6	+8.6
Majority		3,433	55.6	+13.8
Turnout		6,180		
Democratic hold		Swing	+4.8	

State Election 2006: House District 39
Party	Candidate	Votes	%	±%
Democratic	Ernest Hewett	2,431	65.5	−1.4
Republican	Jason Catala	1,081	29.1	+0.0
Working Families	Ernest Hewett	200	5.4	+1.4
Majority		1,550	41.8	+0.0
Turnout		3,712		
Democratic hold		Swing	+0.0	

State Election 2004: House District 39
Party	Candidate	Votes	%	±%
Democratic	Ernest Hewett	3,591	66.9	+4.0
Republican	John Russell	1,562	29.1	−4.3
Working Families	Ernest Hewett	216	4.0	+0.2
Majority		2,245	41.8	+12.3
Turnout		5,369		
Democratic hold		Swing	+4.3	

Democratic Primary, August 10, 2004: House District 39
Party	Candidate	Votes	%	±%
Democratic	Ernest Hewett	623	62.2	
Democratic	Lloyd H. Beachy	378	37.8	
Majority		245	24.5	
Turnout		1,001		

State Election 2002: House District 39
Party	Candidate	Votes	%	±%
Democratic	Wade A. Hyslop, Jr.	2,215	62.9	−28.4
Republican	Jason Catala	1,176	33.4	+33.4
Working Families	Samuel A. Cutler	133	3.8	+3.8
Majority		1,039	29.5	−53.1
Turnout		3,524		
Democratic hold		Swing	-30.9	

State Election 2000: House District 39
Party	Candidate	Votes	%	±%
Democratic	Wade A. Hyslop, Jr.	3,222	91.3	+19.1
Libertarian	Donald A. Nicholas	307	8.7	+6.9
Majority		2,915	82.6	+36.3
Turnout		3,529		
Democratic hold		Swing	+13.0	

State Election 1998: House District 39
Party	Candidate	Votes	%	±%
Democratic	Wade A. Hyslop, Jr.	2,110	72.2	
Republican	Avner Gregory	758	25.9	
Libertarian	Darlene H. Nicholas	54	1.8	
Majority		1,352	46.3	
Turnout		2,922		
Democratic hold		Swing		
