= Craig Miner =

American politician from Connecticut

Member of the Connecticut State Senate from the 30th district
- In office 2017–2023
- Preceded by: Clark Chapin
- Succeeded by: Stephen Harding
- Constituency: represented Brookfield, Canaan, Cornwall, Goshen, Kent, Litchfield, Morris, New Milford, North Canaan, Salisbury, Sharon, Torrington, Warren, and Waterford

Member of the Connecticut House of Representatives from the 66th district
- In office 2009–2017
- Succeeded by: David Wilson

Personal details
- Party: Republican
- Spouse: Margy Miner
- Children: 3

Craig Miner is a Republican former member of the Connecticut Senate, representing the 30th District from 2017-2023.

== Career ==
In 1989, Miner was the owner/operator of Litchfield Hills Filling Station until 1998.

Miner was the former State Senator for the 30th Senate District from 2017-2023, representing part of Fairfield and Litchfield Counties in the Connecticut Senate, including the towns of Brookfield, Canaan, Cornwall, Goshen, Kent, Litchfield, Morris, New Milford, North Canaan, Salisbury, Sharon, Torrington, Warren and Winchester. Prior to his election to the Senate, Miner had served eight terms as the state representative to the 66th House District.

== Personal life ==
Miner's wife is Margy. He had three children Justin, Heather and Katie.

== See also ==
- Connecticut Senate
