= Mary Fritz =

American politician (1938–2016)

Member of the Connecticut House of Representatives from the 90th district
- In office January 7, 1987 – July 9, 2016
- Preceded by: Carleton Benson
- Succeeded by: Craig C. Fishbein
- In office January 5, 1983 – January 9, 1985
- Preceded by: Kenneth Tripp
- Succeeded by: Carleton Benson

Personal details
- Born: May 8, 1938 Cambridge, Massachusetts, U.S.
- Died: July 9, 2016 (aged 78) Wallingford, Connecticut, U.S.
- Party: Democratic
- Children: 6, including David Fritz

Mary Fritz (May 8, 1938 – July 9, 2016) was an American politician who served in the Connecticut House of Representatives from the 90th district from 1983 to 1985 and from 1987 to 2016. She had six children, including David Fritz, who was elected to represent the 90th district in 2026.

Fritz died of cancer on July 9, 2016, in Wallingford, Connecticut at age 78.
