= Theresa Conroy =

American politician

Member of the Connecticut House of Representatives from the 105th district
- In office January 9, 2013 – January 4, 2017
- Preceded by: Len Greene Jr.
- Succeeded by: Nicole Klarides-Ditria
- In office January 7, 2009 – January 5, 2011
- Preceded by: Len Greene Sr.
- Succeeded by: Len Greene Jr.

Personal details
- Born: April 27, 1957 (age 69) Seymour, Connecticut, U.S.
- Party: Democratic

Theresa Conroy (born April 27, 1957) is an American politician who served in the Connecticut House of Representatives from the 105th district from 2009 to 2011 and from 2013 to 2017.
