= Connecticut's 66th House of Representatives district =

American legislative district

Connecticut's 66th State House of Representatives district
Representative
Karen Reddington-Hughes; R

Connecticut's 66th House of Representatives district elects one member of the Connecticut House of Representatives. It consists of the towns of Bethlehem, Morris, Warren and parts of Woodbury and Litchfield. It has been represented by Republican Karen Reddington-Hughes since 2022.

== List of representatives ==
List of representatives from Connecticut's 66th State House district
Representative	Party	Years	District home	Note
Lillian Erb	Republican	1967–1973	Groton	Seat created
Harold G. Harlow	Republican	1973–1977	Litchfield	
Elizabeth A. Wood	Republican	1977–1979	Litchfield	
Michael D. Rybak	Democratic	1979–1987	Harwinton	
Robert A. Maddox Jr.	Republican	1987–2001	Bethlehem	
Craig Miner	Republican	2001–2017	Litchfield	
David Wilson	Republican	2017–2023	Litchfield	
Karen Reddington-Hughes	Republican	2023–	Woodbury	

== Recent elections ==
=== 2020 ===
2020 Connecticut State House of Representatives election, District 66
Party	Candidate	Votes	%
Republican	David T. Wilson (incumbent)	8,209	55.34
Democratic	Matthew D. Dyer	6,122	41.27
Independent Party	David T. Wilson (incumbent)	291	1.96
Working Families	Matthew D. Dyer	212	1.43
Total votes		14,834	100.00
Republican hold			

=== 2018 ===
2018 Connecticut House of Representatives election, District 66
Party	Candidate	Votes	%
Republican	David Wilson (Incumbent)	7,153	57.0
Democratic	Alex Larsson	5,394	43.0
Total votes		12,547	100.00
Republican hold			

=== 2016 ===
2016 Connecticut House of Representatives election, District 66
Party	Candidate	Votes	%
Republican	David Wilson	7,916	58.79
Democratic	Gayle Carr	5,549	41.21
Total votes		13,465	100.00
Republican hold			

=== 2014 ===
2014 Connecticut House of Representatives election, District 66
Party	Candidate	Votes	%
Republican	Craig Miner (Incumbent)	6,625	67.3
Democratic	Marjorie O'Neill	3,223	32.7
Total votes		9,848	100.00
Republican hold			

=== 2012 ===
2012 Connecticut House of Representatives election, District 66
Party	Candidate	Votes	%
Republican	Craig Miner (Incumbent)	8,762	98.2
Working Families	Dennis O'Neill	159	1.8
Total votes		8,921	100.00
Republican hold			
