= Paul Pawlak Sr. =

American politician (1917–2014)

Member of the Connecticut House of Representatives from Seymour
- In office 1961–1967
- Preceded by: Joseph Digris
- Succeeded by: Seat eliminated

Member of the Connecticut House of Representatives from the 95th district
- In office 1967–1969
- Preceded by: Seat created
- Succeeded by: Ronald A. Sarasin

Member of the Connecticut House of Representatives from the 105th district
- In office 1975–1979
- Preceded by: Raymond A. Shea
- Succeeded by: Warren G. Sarasin

Personal details
- Born: July 28, 1917 Shelton, Connecticut, U.S.
- Died: February 23, 2014 (aged 96) Cheshire, Connecticut, U.S.

Paul Pawlak Sr. (July 28, 1917 – February 23, 2014) was an American electrician and politician who served in the Connecticut House of Representatives.

== Personal life ==
Born in Shelton, Connecticut, Pawlak graduated from Seymour High School in Seymour, Connecticut and worked as an electrician for forty years. Pawlak died in Cheshire, Connecticut on February 23, 2014, at the age of 96.

== Political career ==
Pawlak served in local government as a selectman and on the board of education.

Pawlak was first elected to the Connecticut House of Representatives in 1960 to represent the town of Seymour as a Democrat. He served three terms before the seat was eliminated in the 1966 election cycle, when Connecticut was redistricted into population-based districts instead of single-town districts. Seymour was placed in the 95th district, and Pawlak served one term before he was defeated for reelection by Republican candidate Ronald A. Sarasin in 1968.

In 1972, Connecticut was again redistricted, and Seymour was placed in the 105th district, where Pawlak was elected to serve two terms from 1975 to 1979. He ran for reelection in 1978, but was narrowly defeated by Republican candidate Warren G. Sarasin, losing by a margin of 44 votes.
