= Connecticut's 67th House of Representatives district =

American legislative district

Connecticut's 67th State House of Representatives district
Representative
Bill Buckbee; R

Connecticut's 67th House of Representatives district elects one member of the Connecticut House of Representatives. It encompasses parts of New Milford and has been represented by Bill Buckbee since 2017.

== List of representatives ==
List of representatives from Connecticut's 67th State House district
Representative	Party	Years	District home	Note
Mary Hill	Democratic	1967–1973	New London	Seat created
Walter J. Conn	Republican	1973–1985	New Milford	
Oskar G. Rogg	Republican	1985–1993	New Milford	
Jeanne Garvey	Republican	1993–2001	New Milford	
Clark Chapin	Republican	2001–2013	New Milford	
Cecilia Buck-Taylor	Republican	2013–2017	New Milford	
Bill Buckbee	Republican	2017–	New Milford	

== Recent elections ==
=== 2020 ===
2020 Connecticut State House of Representatives election, District 67
Party	Candidate	Votes	%
Republican	Bill Buckbee (incumbent)	7,221	56.10
Democratic	Hilary Ram	4,856	37.73
Independent Party	Bill Buckbee (incumbent)	589	4.58
Working Families	Hilary Ram	205	1.59
Total votes		12,871	100.00
Republican hold			

=== 2018 ===
2018 Connecticut House of Representatives election, District 67
Party	Candidate	Votes	%
Republican	Bill Buckbee (Incumbent)	5,667	57.7
Democratic	Thomas O'Brien	4,150	42.3
Total votes		9,813	100.00
Republican hold			

=== 2016 ===
2016 Connecticut House of Representatives election, District 67
Party	Candidate	Votes	%
Republican	Bill Buckbee	6,539	58.02
Democratic	Mary Jane Lungdren	4,525	40.15
Green	Cindy Day	207	1.84
Total votes		11,271	100.00
Republican hold			

=== 2014 ===
2014 Connecticut House of Representatives election, District 67
Party	Candidate	Votes	%
Republican	Cecilia Buck-Taylor (Incumbent)	4,032	59.4
Democratic	Gale Alexander	2,426	35.8
Working Families	Gale Alexander	167	2.5
Green	Cindy Day	158	2.3
Total votes		6,783	100.00
Republican hold			

=== 2012 ===
2012 Connecticut House of Representatives election, District 67
Party	Candidate	Votes	%
Republican	Cecilia Buck-Taylor (Incumbent)	5,383	52
Democratic	Andrew B. Grossman	4,930	47.6
Green	Nicholas W. Payne	47	0.5
Total votes		10,360	100.00
Republican hold			
