= Christine Rosati Randall =

American politician

Member of the Connecticut House of Representatives from the 44th district
- In office January 7, 2015 – January 4, 2017
- Preceded by: Mae Flexer
- Succeeded by: Anne Dauphinais

Personal details
- Born: June 22, 1969 (age 57)
- Party: Democratic

Christine Rosati Randall (born June 22, 1969) is an American politician who served in the Connecticut House of Representatives from the 44th district from 2015 to 2017.
