= Connecticut's 45th House of Representatives district =

American legislative district

Connecticut's 45th State House of Representatives district
Representative
Brian Lanoue; R

Connecticut's 45th House of Representatives district elects one member of the Connecticut House of Representatives. It consists of the towns of Griswold, Sterling, Voluntown as well as parts of Lisbon and Plainfield. It has been represented by Republican Brian Lanoue since 2019.

== List of representatives ==
List of representatives from Connecticut's 45th State House district
Representative	Party	Years	District home	Note
Stanley A. Bigos	Democratic	1967–1973	Thompsonville	Seat created
Grant B. Apthorp	Republican	1973–1975	Griswold	
Dorothy Faulise	Democratic	1975–1981	Norwich	
David Anderson	Republican	1981–1993	Norwich	
Steve Mikutel	Democratic	1993–2015	Griswold	
Paul Brycki	Democratic	2015–2017	Griswold	
Kevin Skulczyck	Republican	2017–2019	Griswold	
Brian Lanoue	Republican	2019–	Griswold	

== Recent elections ==
=== 2020 ===
2020 Connecticut State House of Representatives election, District 45
Party	Candidate	Votes	%
Republican	Brian Lanoue (incumbent)	6,640	56.57
Democratic	Mark DePonte	4,790	40.81
Independent Party	Daniel Reale	308	2.62
Total votes		11,768	100.00
Republican hold			

=== 2018 ===
2018 Connecticut House of Representatives election, District 45
Party	Candidate	Votes	%
Republican	Brian Lanoue	4,716	53.9
Democratic	Steve Mikutel	4,035	46.1
Total votes		8,751	100.00
Republican hold			

=== 2016 ===
2016 Connecticut House of Representatives election, District 45
Party	Candidate	Votes	%
Republican	Kevin Skulczyck	6,389	62.39
Democratic	Tracy Hanson	3,851	37.61
Total votes		10,240	100.00
Republican gain from Democratic			

=== 2014 ===
2014 Connecticut House of Representatives election, District 45
Party	Candidate	Votes	%
Democratic	Paul Brycki	3,588	51.5
Republican	Tracy Hanson	3,382	48.5
Total votes		6,970	100.00
Democratic hold			

=== 2012 ===
2012 Connecticut House of Representatives election, District 45
Party	Candidate	Votes	%
Democratic	Steve Mikutel (Incumbent)	6,082	67.7
Republican	Rich Eighme	2,905	32.3
Total votes		8,987	100.00
Democratic hold			
