= John Fusco (Connecticut politician) =

American politician

Member of the Connecticut House of Representatives from the 81st district
- In office 2017–2022
- Preceded by: David Zoni
- Succeeded by: Chris Poulos

Personal details
- Party: Republican

John Fusco is an American Republican Party politician who served as a member of the Connecticut House of Representatives from the 81st district, which includes part of the town of Southington, from 2017 to 2022. Fusco was first elected in 2016 and served as a member of the Banking, Aging, and Commerce Committees.
