= Anne Dauphinais =

American politician (born 1960)

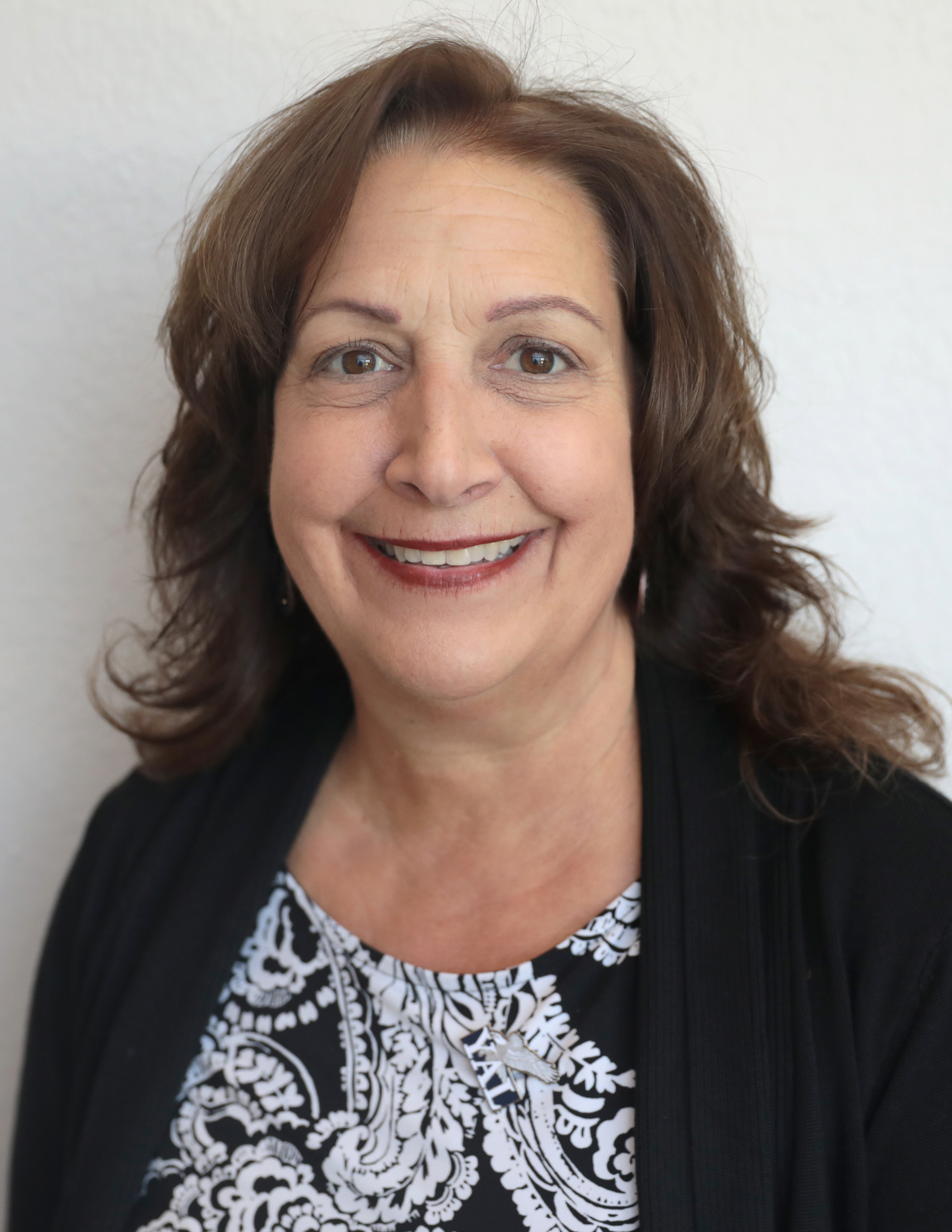
- Dauphinais at the 2022 Hazlitt Summit hosted by Young Americans for Liberty Foundation

Member of the Connecticut House of Representatives from the 44th district
- Incumbent
- Assumed office January 4, 2017
- Preceded by: Christine Rosati Randall

Personal details
- Born: Killingly, Connecticut, U.S.
- Party: Republican
- Spouse: Dale Dauphinais
- Children: 4
- Education: Eastern Connecticut State University (BA); Maine Vocational Technical Institution
- Website: www.cthousegop.com/dauphinais/

Anne Dauphinais (born 1960) is an American nurse, sales consultant, former case manager, and politician serving in the Connecticut House of Representatives for District 44, comprising the towns of Killingly, Plainfield, and Sterling. A Republican, Dauphinais grew up in Killingly and graduated from the Northern Maine Vocational Technical Institute and from Eastern Connecticut State University. She worked in nursing, sales, and for the Connecticut Department of Correction before first being elected to the House in 2016. Dauphinais was a prominent critic of compulsory COVID-19 vaccine legislation in Connecticut.

== Early life and career ==
Dauphinais was born in 1960 and grew up in Killingly. She attended Eastern Connecticut State University where she received a Bachelor of Arts in sociology, and she graduated from Northern Maine Vocational Technical Institution's nursing program in 1986.

Dauphinais worked as a nurse, as a pre-release case manager for the Connecticut Department of Correction, and as a sales consultant for Novartis.

== Political career ==
Dauphinais first ran for the House District 44 seat in 2016. She defeated incumbent Democrat Christine Rosati Randall 60%-40%. She faced Randall again in both 2018 and 2020 and won with very similar margins. In 2022, she defeated Randall's husband, David, again by a similar margin.

Dauphinais is a member of the Connecticut General Assembly Conservative Caucus.

== Opposition to COVID measures ==
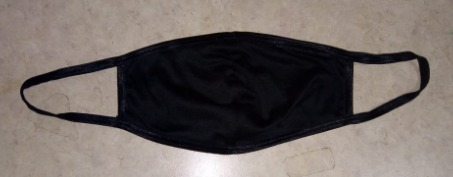
Dauphinais opposed face mask requirements implemented to curb the spread of the COVID-19 pandemic.

On September 2, 2020, the Connecticut House Republican caucus gathered at a press conference at the Connecticut state capitol to express opposition to Governor Ned Lamont's emergency COVID-19 orders. Dauphinais was the only caucus member to appear without a face mask. She told reporters that she "believes wearing a mask should be voluntary" and was doubtful of their effectiveness against preventing the spread of COVID-19.

Dauphinais organized and spoke at a rally the next day where participants called for an end to Lamont's emergency orders. The event drew around 100 participants.

== Vaccine exemptions ==
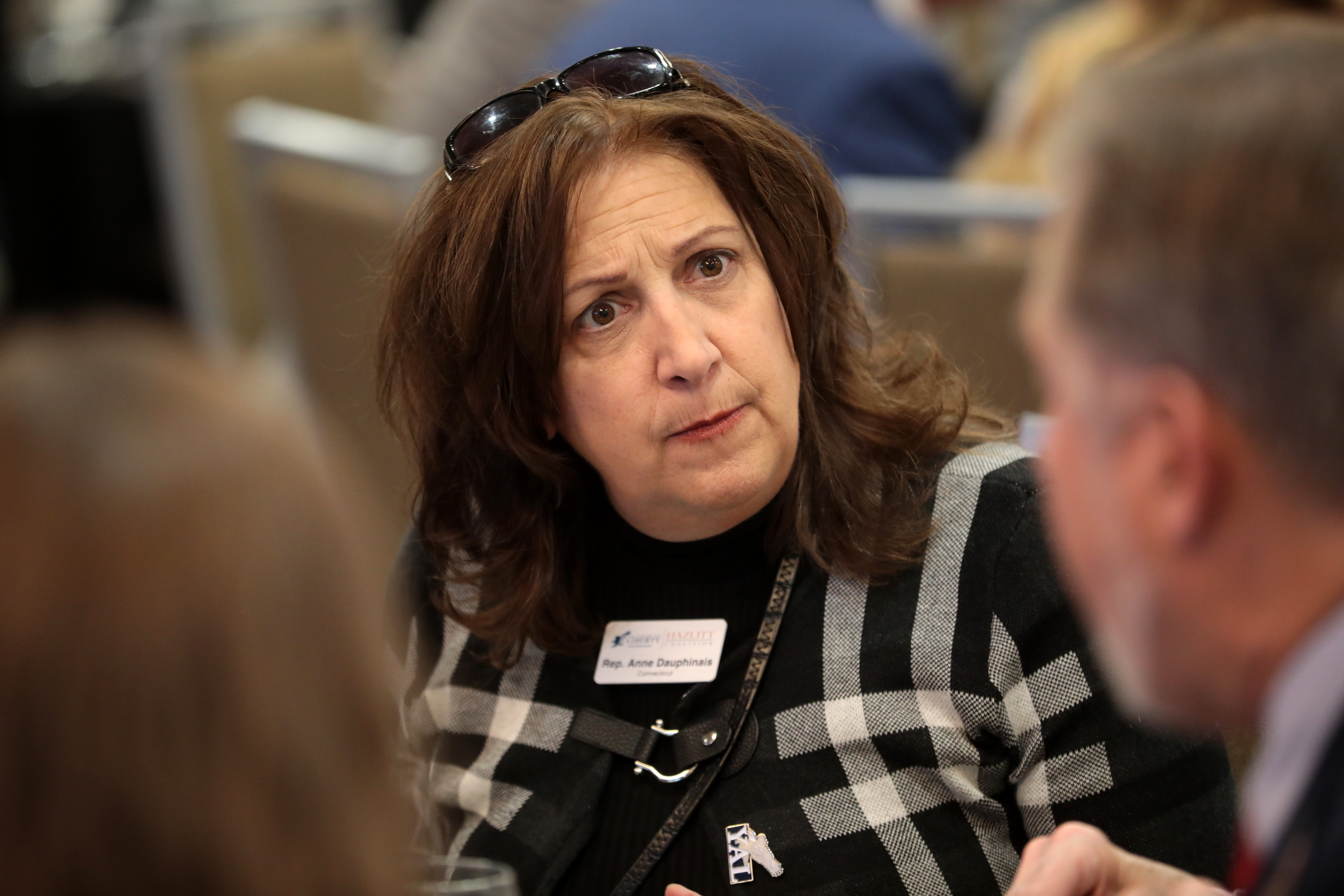
Dauphinais at the 2022 Hazlitt Summit

Dauphinais was a leader of the opposition to HB #6423, a 2021 bill that sought to eliminate religious exemptions to childhood vaccinations for children attending school in Connecticut. In March 2019, she helped bring prominent anti-vaccine activist Robert F. Kennedy Jr. to a rally at the Connecticut State House where he presented information questioning the safety and efficacy of vaccines. In April 2019, Dauphinais helped collect signatures for a letter to Connecticut Attorney General William Tong claiming the new vaccine law would be a violation of citizens' rights. Dauphinais joined four legislative colleagues on a July 30, 2019 letter to Connecticut Department of Public Health Commissioner Renee Coleman-Mitchell urging her not to take a stand on the issue. The letter stated that the bill in question was "a question of constitutional and civil rights law" and that it was therefore not in the purview of the Department of Public Health to support it.

Dauphinais spoke at a 2021 rally against the compulsory vaccine bill prior to its consideration in the House.

== Personal life ==
Dauphinais and her husband, Dale Dauphinais, have four children, including a daughter she describes as a "special needs adult," and four grandchildren. Dauphinais enjoys gardening, traveling and skiing. Dauphinais's husband Dale is chairman of a Quiet Corner chapter of the Tea Party movement.

== Electoral history ==
2016 Connecticut House District 44 Republican Primary
Party	Candidate	Votes	%
Republican	Anne Dauphinais		100.0%
Total votes			100.0%

2016 Connecticut House District 44 General Election
Party	Candidate	Votes	%
Republican	Anne Dauphinais	5,592	60.3%
Democratic	Christine Rosati Randall	3,677	39.7%
Total votes		9,269	100.0%

2018 Connecticut House District 44 General Election
Party	Candidate	Votes	%
Republican	Anne Dauphinais	4,744	61.3%
Democratic	Christine Rosati Randall	2,998	38.7%
Total votes		7,742	100.0%

2020 Connecticut House District 44 General Election
Party	Candidate	Votes	%
Republican	Anne Dauphinais	6,545	60.2%
Democratic	Christine Rosati Randall	4,320	39.8%
Total votes		10,865	100%
