= Kevin Skulczyck =

American politician (born 1969)

Member of the Connecticut House of Representatives from the 45th district
- In office January 4, 2017 – January 9, 2019
- Preceded by: Paul Brycki
- Succeeded by: Brian Lanoue

Personal details
- Born: December 17, 1969 (age 56)
- Party: Republican

Kevin Skulczyck AKA Kevin Alan (born December 17, 1969) is an American politician who served in the Connecticut House of Representatives from the 45th district from 2017 to 2019.
