= Chris Soto =

American politician

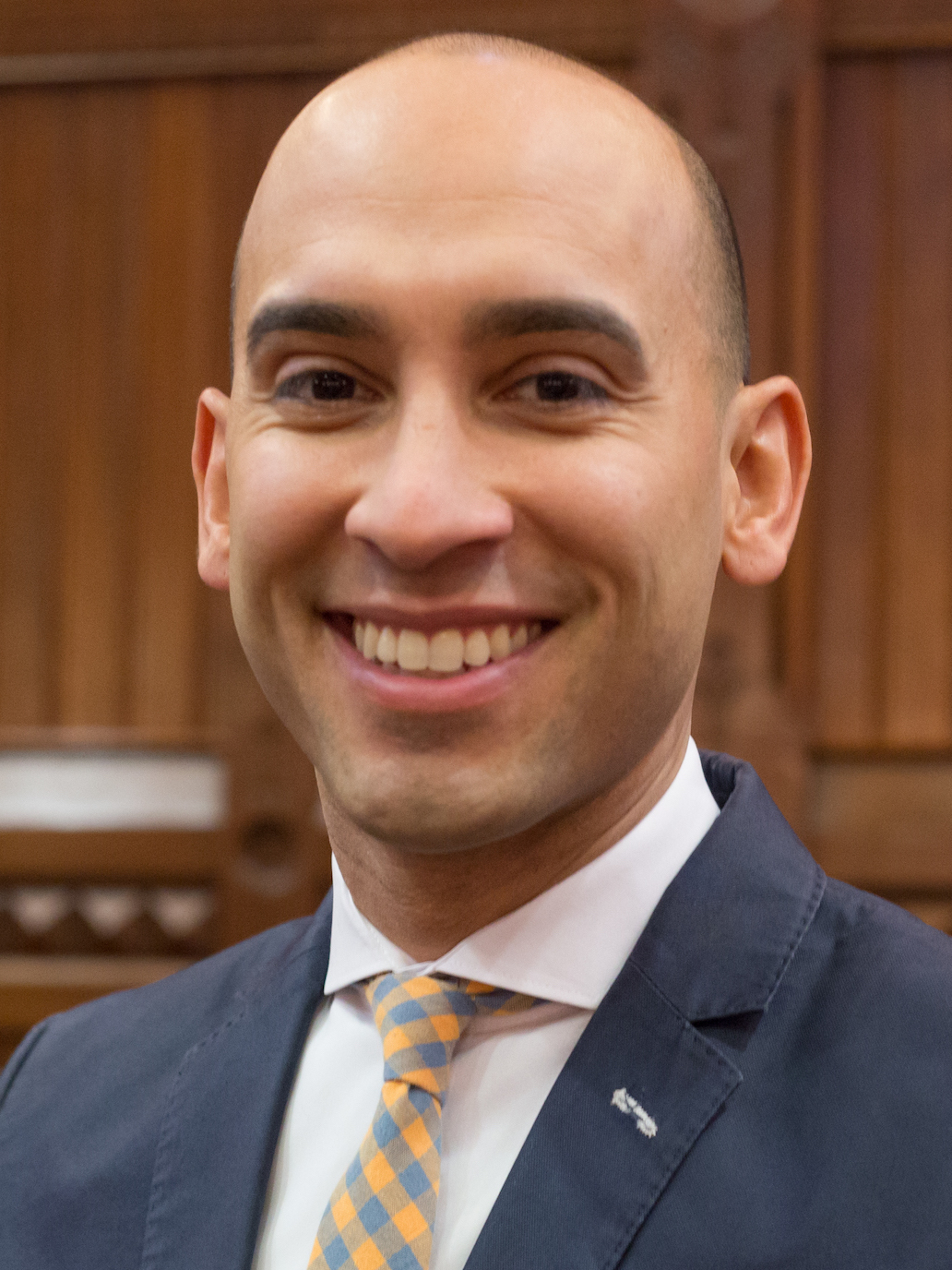

Member of the Connecticut House of Representatives from the 39th district
- In office January 2017 – January 8, 2019
- Preceded by: Ernest Hewett
- Succeeded by: Anthony Nolan

Personal details
- Born: New York, New York
- Party: Democratic
- Education: United States Coast Guard Academy (BS); Brown University (MPA)

Military service
- Branch/service: Coast Guard
- Years of service: 2003–2008 (active), 2008-2013 (reserve)
- Rank: Lieutenant Commander

Chris Soto is an American politician and former member of the Connecticut House of Representatives, serving from 2017 to 2019. He was first elected to the legislature in 2016, representing the 39th district of New London. Soto most recently served at the United States Department of Education as a senior advisor to Secretary of Education Miguel Cardona.

== Early life and education ==
Soto was born in Manhattan, New York City and raised in West New York, New Jersey. After graduating from High School, he received an appointment to attend the U.S. Coast Guard Academy, He graduated and earned a Bachelor of Science degree in Operations Research. Soto also earned his Master's in Public Affairs (MPA) from Brown University.

== Military service ==
Following graduation from the Coast Guard Academy, Soto served as an Engineer Officer in Training on the USCGC Valiant (WMEC-621). Immediately following, he received orders to Maritime Safety and Security Team New York. He left active duty service in 2008 and continued in the active reserve until 2013. He separated from the reserves at the rank of Lieutenant Commander.

== Political career ==
=== Connecticut House of Representatives ===
Soto was elected to the Connecticut House of Representatives in 2016. He defeated long-time incumbent Ernest Hewett by a near 2-to-1 ratio. He went on to win the general election with 83% of the vote. Soto went unchallenged in the 2018 general election. Soto served in the state house for two years from 2017 to 2019. During his time in the house, Soto served as vice-chairman of the Appropriations Committee and member of the Housing, and Higher Education & Employment Advancement committees.

While serving in the state House, Soto worked successfully to expand in-state tuition aid to undocumented students, helped draft and pass legislation to regulate Sober Homes, and successfully championed the renovation New London's Bartlett Park. Soto also worked with Southeastern Connecticut legislators and the Governor's Office to successfully fund infrastructure improvements at New London's State Pier and is also credited for proactively helping to increase Latino voter turnout in the city of New London.

=== Appointed Roles ===
Soto left his role in the Connecticut House to join Governor Ned Lamont's administration as Director of Legislative Affairs in 2019. In early 2020, Soto joined the Connecticut's State Department of Education as Director of Innovation and Partnerships to then Connecticut State Education Commissioner Miguel Cardona.

=== U.S. Department of Education ===
Chris Soto joined the U.S. Department of Education under the Biden Administration in June 2021 as Senior Advisor to Secretary of Education Miguel Cardona. In this role, he served as a trusted advisor to the Secretary and led the department's work on helping transform Puerto Rico's education system. He worked closely with the Puerto Rican Government so federal funds could be used for the first teacher pay raise in 12 years. Soto's main efforts specifically revolved around Decentralizing the Puerto Rico Department of Education's unitary school system and depoliticizing central office decision-making.

In addition, Soto worked to help the Guam Department of Education remove their decades-long Third-Party Fiduciary Status, initially imposed by the U.S. Department of Education.

== Coast Guard Academy criticism ==
Soto has been vocal about the lack of accountability at the Coast Guard Academy with respect to issues of racism and discrimination. He was the first to call for an investigation by federal officials after cadets complained of systemic discrimination at the institution. He previously criticized the institution on the lack of recruiting diversity in their incoming classes.

== Other work ==
Soto is the founder and first executive director of Higher Edge, a college completion organization in Eastern Connecticut that supports high school students getting to and through college.

== Electoral history ==
Connecticut 39th State House District Primary Election, 2016
Party	Candidate	Votes	%
Democratic	Chris Soto	994	65.95
Democratic	Ernest Hewett (incumbent)	513	34.04
Total votes		1,507	100.0

Connecticut 39th State House District General Election, 2016
Party	Candidate	Votes	%
Democratic	Chris Soto	4,904	83.67
Petitioning Candidate	Andrew R. Lockwood	517	8.82
Green	Ronna K. Stuller	440	7.51
Total votes		5,861	100.0

Connecticut 39th State House District General Election, 2018
Party	Candidate	Votes	%
Democratic	Chris Soto (incumbent)	4,136	93.98
Green	Chris Soto	265	6.02
Total votes		4,401	100.0
