= Cecilia Buck-Taylor =

American politician

Member of the Connecticut House of Representatives from the 67th district
- In office January 9, 2013 – January 4, 2017
- Preceded by: Clark Chapin
- Succeeded by: Bill Buckbee

Personal details
- Born: December 18, 1953 (age 72) Brooklyn, New York, U.S.
- Party: Republican

Cecilia Buck-Taylor (born December 18, 1953) is an American politician who served in the Connecticut House of Representatives from the 67th district from 2013 to 2017.
