= Connecticut's 81st House of Representatives district =

American legislative district

Connecticut's 81st State House of Representatives district
Representative
Chris Poulos; D

Connecticut's 81st House of Representatives district elects one member of the Connecticut House of Representatives. It encompasses parts of Southington and is represented by Democrat Chris Poulos.

== List of representatives ==
List of Representatives from Connecticut's 81st State House District
Representative	Party	Years	District home	Note
John A. Carrozzella	Democratic	1967–1973	Wallingford	Seat created
James J. Clynes	Democratic	1973–1977	Southington	
Arthur R. Della Vecchia	Democratic	1977–1981	Southington	
Gerald P. Crean Jr.	Democratic	1981–1985	Southington	
Angelo Fusco	Republican	1985–1999	Southington	
Chris Murphy	Democratic	1999–2003	Southington	
Bruce Zalaski	Democratic	2003–2013	Southington	
David Zoni	Democratic	2013–2017	Southington	
John Fusco	Republican	2017–2023	Southington	
Chris Poulos	Democratic	2023–	Southington	

== Recent elections ==
=== 2022 ===
2022 Connecticut State House of Representatives election, District 81
Party	Candidate	Votes	%
Democratic	Chris Poulos	5,297	50.00472
Republican	Tony Morrison	5,179	48.89
Independent Party	Tony Morrison	117	1.10
Total votes		10,593	100.00
Democratic gain from Republican			

=== 2020 ===
2020 Connecticut State House of Representatives election, District 81
Party	Candidate	Votes	%
Republican	John Fusco (incumbent)	7,377	55.04
Democratic	Dagmara Scalise	5,542	41.35
Independent Party	John Fusco (incumbent)	483	3.60
Total votes		13,402	100.00
Republican hold			

=== 2018 ===
2018 Connecticut House of Representatives election, District 81
Party	Candidate	Votes	%
Republican	John Fusco (Incumbent)	5,859	56.4
Democratic	Ryan Rogers	4,538	43.6
Total votes		10,397	100.00
Republican hold			

=== 2016 ===
2016 Connecticut House of Representatives election, District 81
Party	Candidate	Votes	%
Republican	John Fusco	6,991	59.15
Democratic	David Zoni (Incumbent)	4,829	40.85
Total votes		11,820	100.00
Republican gain from Democratic			

=== 2014 ===
2014 Connecticut House of Representatives election, District 81
Party	Candidate	Votes	%
Democratic	David Zoni (Incumbent)	4,041	48.2
Republican	Al Natelli	3,941	47.0
Working Families	David Zoni (Incumbent)	401	4.8
Total votes		8,383	100.00
Democratic hold			

=== 2012 ===
2012 Connecticut House of Representatives election, District 81
Party	Candidate	Votes	%
Democratic	David Zoni	5,448	51.4
Republican	Cheryl Lounsbury	5,141	48.6
Total votes		10,589	100.00
Democratic hold			
