= David Zoni =

American politician

Member of the Connecticut House of Representatives from the 81st district
- In office January 9, 2013 – January 4, 2017
- Preceded by: Bruce Zalaski
- Succeeded by: John Fusco

Personal details
- Party: Democratic

David Zoni is an American politician who served in the Connecticut House of Representatives from the 81st district from 2013 to 2017.
