= Robert Megna =

American politician

Member of the Connecticut House of Representatives from the 97th district
- In office January 3, 2001 – January 4, 2017
- Preceded by: Chris DePino
- Succeeded by: Alphonse Paolillo

Personal details
- Born: December 10, 1958 (age 67) Hackensack, New Jersey, U.S.
- Party: Democratic

Robert Megna (born December 10, 1958) is an American politician who served in the Connecticut House of Representatives from the 97th district from 2001 to 2017.
