= Nicole Klarides-Ditria =

American politician from Connecticut

Member of the Connecticut House of Representatives from the 105th district
- Incumbent
- Assumed office January 4, 2017
- Preceded by: Theresa Conroy

Personal details
- Born: November 17, 1968 (age 57) Seymour, Connecticut, U.S.
- Party: Republican
- Relatives: Themis Klarides (sister)
- Education: Quinnipiac University (BS); Southern Connecticut State University (MAT)

Nicole Klarides-Ditria (born November 17, 1968) is an American politician who has served in the Connecticut House of Representatives from the 105th district since 2017. Her sister, Themis Klarides, is the former Minority Leader of the Connecticut House of Representatives.
