= Bill Buckbee =

American politician

Member of the Connecticut House of Representatives from the 67th district
- Incumbent
- Assumed office January 4, 2017
- Preceded by: Cecilia Buck-Taylor

Personal details
- Born: 1971 (age 54–55)
- Party: Republican
- Education: Western Connecticut State University

William Buckbee (born 1971) is an American politician currently serving as a Republican member of the Connecticut House of Representatives serving in Connecticut's 67th district. Buckbee was first elected in 2016. He is also an Assistant Republican Leader.

In November 2025, Buckbee made a joke about the 6-7 meme during a special legislative session.
