= Connecticut's 97th House of Representatives district =

American legislative district

Connecticut's 97th State House of Representatives district
Representative
Alphonse Paolillo; D

Connecticut's 97th House of Representatives district elects one member of the Connecticut House of Representatives. It encompasses parts of New Haven and has been represented by Democrat Alphonse Paolillo since 2019.

== List of representatives ==
List of Representatives from Connecticut's 97th State House District
Representative	Party	Years	District home	Note
John B. Chagnon	Democratic	1967–1973	Hamden	Seat created
M. James Canali	Republican	1973–1975	New Haven	
Michael J. Natalino	Democratic	1975–1977	New Haven	
George E. Longyear	Republican	1977–1979	New Haven	
Alfred J. Onorato	Democratic	1979–1985	New Haven	
Robert J. Hauser Jr.	Democratic	1985–1993	New Haven	
Chris DePino	Republican	1993–2001	New Haven	
Robert Megna	Democratic	2001–2017	New Haven	
Alphonse Paolillo	Democratic	2017–	New Haven	

== Recent elections ==
=== 2020 ===
2020 Connecticut State House of Representatives election, District 97
Party	Candidate	Votes	%
Democratic	Alphonse Paolillo (incumbent)	6,042	76.08
Republican	Erin Reilly	1,745	21.97
Independent Party	Erin Reilly	155	1.95
Total votes		11,952	100.00
Democratic hold			

=== 2018 ===
2018 Connecticut State Senate election, District 97
Party	Candidate	Votes	%
Democratic	Alphonse Paolillo (Incumbent)	4,890	80.2
Republican	Joshua Van Hoesen	1,207	19.8
Total votes		6,097	100.00
Democratic hold			

=== 2016 ===
2016 Connecticut State Senate election, District 97
Party	Candidate	Votes	%
Democratic	Alphonse Paolillo	5,717	100.00
Total votes		5,717	100.00
Democratic hold			

=== 2014 ===
2014 Connecticut State Senate election, District 97
Party	Candidate	Votes	%
Democratic	Robert Megna (Incumbent)	3,334	69.2
Republican	John Cirello	1,053	21.8
Working Families	Robert Megna (Incumbent)	220	4.6
Independent Party	John Cirello	214	4.4
Total votes		6,097	100.00
Democratic hold			

=== 2012 ===
2012 Connecticut State Senate election, District 97
Party	Candidate	Votes	%
Democratic	Robert Megna (Incumbent)	6,251	100.00
Total votes		6,251	100.00
Democratic hold			
