= Gary Orefice =

American politician (1942–2018)

Member of the Connecticut House of Representatives from the 37th district
- In office January 6, 1993 – January 5, 2005
- Preceded by: Fred Lundfelt
- Succeeded by: Ed Jutila

Personal details
- Born: December 30, 1942 Hartford, Connecticut, U.S.
- Died: September 23, 2018 (aged 75) Niantic, Connecticut, U.S.
- Party: Democratic

Gary Orefice (December 30, 1942 – September 23, 2018) was an American politician who served in the Connecticut House of Representatives from the 37th district from 1993 to 2005.

He died of cancer on September 23, 2018, in Niantic, Connecticut at age 75.
