= Alphonse Paolillo =

American politician

Member of the Connecticut House of Representatives from the 97th district
- Incumbent
- Assumed office January 4th, 2017
- Preceded by: Robert Megna

Personal details
- Born: 1972 (age 53–54) New Haven, Connecticut, U.S.
- Party: Democratic
- Education: University of Connecticut (BA)

Alphonse Paolillo Jr. (born 1972) is an American politician serving as a member of the Connecticut House of Representatives from the 97th district. He assumed office in 2017.

== Early life and education ==
Paolillo was born and raised in New Haven, Connecticut, where he graduated from Wilbur Cross High School in 1990. He then earned a Bachelor of Arts degree from the University of Connecticut in 1995.

== Career ==
Paolillo after graduating from college, Paolillo worked in the office of U.S. Senator Joe Lieberman. He has since worked as a representative for John Hancock Financial. Paolillo was elected to the New Haven Board of Alders and later served as majority leader of the board. Paolillo was elected to the Connecticut House of Representatives in 2016 and assumed office in 2017. Paolillo is the vice chair of the House Public Safety and Security Committee.
