= David Wilson (Connecticut politician) =

American politician

Member of the Connecticut House of Representatives from the 66th district
- In office January 4, 2017 – January 4, 2023
- Preceded by: Craig Miner
- Succeeded by: Karen Reddington-Hughes

Personal details
- Party: Republican
- Education: Western Connecticut State University

David Wilson is an American Republican politician who has served as a member from the Connecticut House of Representatives from the 66th district, which includes the towns of Bethlehem, Morris, Warren, and parts of Litchfield and Woodbury, from 2017 until 2023.

== Career ==
Wilson was first elected in 2016 by a 12-point margin over Democrat Gayle Carr. Wilson was re-elected in 2018 and 2020. In February 2022, Wilson announced that he would not seek re-election in the 2022 election. Wilson has spoken out in support of increasing the annual salary for state representatives and senators. While in office, Wilson served as Ranking Member of the House Aging Committee and a member of both the Appropriations and Environment Committees.
