= Paul Brycki =

American politician

Member of the Connecticut House of Representatives from the 45th district
- In office January 7, 2015 – January 4, 2017
- Preceded by: Steve Mikutel
- Succeeded by: Kevin Skulczyck

Personal details
- Born: June 29, 1950 (age 76)
- Party: Democratic

Paul Brycki (born June 29, 1950) is an American politician who served in the Connecticut House of Representatives from the 45th district from 2015 to 2017.
