= Ernest Hewett =

American politician

Connecticut House of Representatives
- In office 2005–2017
- Preceded by: Chris Soto

Member of the Connecticut House of Representatives from the Connecticut's 39th assembly district district

Personal details
- Born: Cedar Grove, North Carolina
- Party: Democratic
- Spouse: Patricia Hewett

Ernest Hewett is a Democratic politician from New London, Connecticut. He represented Connecticut's 39th assembly district in the Connecticut House of Representatives and was the Deputy Speaker of the House before being forced to resign following a scandal over a lewd comment the Representative made on the record to a teenage girl.

== Early and personal life ==
Ernest Hewett was born in Cedar Grove, North Carolina. From 1974 to 1994 he worked as a welder at Electric Boat. He is married to Patricia Hewett. The couple reside in New London and have three children.

== Political career ==
=== Local ===
Hewett was elected to the New London City council in 1996 and sat on the council until 2002. He served as the Deputy Mayor of New London from 1999 to 2000 and as Mayor from 2000 to 2001.

=== State ===
Ernest Hewett was elected to the Connecticut House of Representatives in 2005 and served until 2017 when he was defeated in the Democratic primary by challenger Chris Soto. In 2013 he was at the center of a political scandal when he was alleged to have verbally sexually harassed a high school girl who was testifying before the Appropriations Committee about the Connecticut Science Center in Hartford. The session was recorded and on the recording Representative Hewett can be heard telling the witness, who talked about overcoming her fear of snakes during the course of an experience at the Science Center, "And if you're bashful, I've got a snake settin' under my desk here." Hewett refused calls to step down. He created further controversy when he defended himself in an interview by saying “I purposely will not have female interns. My intern now is a male. I want to keep it like that." Hewett also claimed to be the “victim” in the whole affair and refused to acknowledge the sexual nature of his comment.
