= Craig C. Fishbein =

American politician (born 1965)

Member of the Connecticut House of Representatives from the 90th district
- Incumbent
- Assumed office November 18, 2016
- Preceded by: Mary Fritz
- Succeeded by: David Fritz (elect)

Personal details
- Born: July 16, 1965 (age 61) Queens, New York, US
- Party: Republican
- Education: Quinnipiac University (BS, JD)
- Profession: Attorney
- Website: repfishbein.com

Craig Charles Fishbein (born July 16, 1965) is a member of the Connecticut House of Representatives representing the 90th State House District. A resident of Wallingford, Connecticut, he was first elected to the Connecticut General Assembly as a state representative in 2016, in a special election (to fill the vacancy created by the passing of Mary Fritz) and a regular election, both held on the same date. He represents parts of Wallingford and Middlefield.

== Biography ==
Fishbein was born on July 16, 1965, in Queens, New York. He graduated from Mark T. Sheehan High School in 1983 and Quinnipiac University in 1997 with a degree in Marketing, and from Quinnipiac University School of Law in 2001. Since 2002, he has been practicing law with his father at Fishbein Law Firm, LLC, in Wallingford.

== Political career ==
Fishbein is a member of the Wallingford Town Council, having first been elected to that position in 2009. In addition to his duties as a member of the town council, he was the chairman of its Ordinance Committee, from 2012 through 2017.

Fishbein is serving his fifth term as state representative for Connecticut's 90th District which includes portions of Wallingford, Connecticut, and Middlefield, Connecticut. In his first term, Fishbein served on the Public Safety and Security Committee, Energy & Technology Committee, and the Commerce Committee. In this second term, he served on the Labor and Public Sector Employees Committee, the Judiciary Committee, and the Public Safety and Security Committee. In his third term he is serving as the ranking member of the Judiciary Committee, as well as the Government Accountability & Elections Committee, and the Environment Committee.

Fishbein, seeking his sixth term, was defeated in 2026 by David J. Fritz.

Fishbein is a founding member of the Connecticut General Assembly Conservative Caucus and is currently its vice-chairman.

== Controversies ==
In 2018, during a House debate, Fishbein used the phrase "monkey see, monkey do" while discussing ethnic minorities seeking recompense for discrimination based on their hairstyle. Fishbein later apologized for the comment. The bill, known as the CROWN Act, passed the state House with a vote of 139–9, with Fishbein voting against it.

In 2018, Fishbein, who is also a family law attorney received widespread criticism for saying, "I can tell you from the divorces that I do, which are many, sometimes domestic violence is arranged, involved, and sometimes it’s appalling," during a House debate over a bill that would reduce arrests of domestic violence victims when they call the police for help. The bill, which would have an effect on domestic violence survivors, a majority of whom are ethnic minority women, passed the Connecticut State Senate unanimously and passed the Connecticut House of Representatives with a vote of 147–1. Fishbein was the only member of the legislature to vote against it.

On May 30, 2020, Fishbein retweeted an image of Joe Biden with the caption, "If you aren't setting fire to buildings...then you ain't black." Fishbein said in an apology that he didn't "know the extent of what was going on" and removed the tweet on Monday, June 1, following criticism from both Democrats and Republicans. On Tuesday, June 2, the Wallingford Town Council voted unanimously to censure Fishbein, with one calling the retweet "backwards and unsophisticated". On June 12, 2020, about 200 people attended a rally outside of town hall calling for his resignation. Fishbein later stated that he did not believe sharing the meme was a "racist act," stating that it was instead an "albeit awkward attempt at trying to point out the racial double standard which exists on the left." While Fishbein admits retweeting the meme with no context or clarification was a mistake, he insists that the purpose of it was not to express a racist sentiment.

== Electoral history ==
Connecticut House of Representatives 90th District (Special) Election, 2016
Party	Candidate	Votes	%
Republican*	Craig C. Fishbein	6570	58.02
Democratic	Patrick Reynolds	4752	41.98

Connecticut House of Representatives 90th District Regular Election, 2016
Party	Candidate	Votes	%
Republican*	Craig C. Fishbein	7051	59.20
Democratic	Patrick Reynolds	4860	40.80

Connecticut House of Representatives 90th District Regular Election, 2018
Party	Candidate	Votes	%
Republican*	Craig C. Fishbein	5929	53.52
Democratic	Daniel Fontaine	5150	46.49

Connecticut House of Representatives 90th District Regular Election, 2020
Party	Candidate	Votes	%
Republican*	Craig C. Fishbein	7055	50.03
Democratic	Jim Jinks	7048	49.97

Connecticut House of Representatives 90th District Regular Election, 2022
Party	Candidate	Votes	%
Republican*	Craig C. Fishbein	6166	50.50
Democratic	Rebecca Hyland	4944	44.50

Connecticut House of Representatives 90th District Regular Election, 2024
Party	Candidate	Votes	%
Republican*	Craig C. Fishbein	7055	54.52
Democratic	Rebecca Hyland	6265	45.48

Connecticut House of Representatives 90th District Regular Election, 2026
Party	Candidate	Votes	%
Republican*	Craig C. Fishbein	5142	48.44
Democratic	David J. Fritz	5474	51.56
