= Steve Mikutel =

American politician (born 1950)

Member of the Connecticut House of Representatives from the 45th district
- In office January 6, 1993 – January 7, 2015
- Preceded by: David Anderson
- Succeeded by: Paul Brycki

Personal details
- Born: January 3, 1950 (age 76) Norwich, Connecticut, U.S.
- Party: Democratic

Steve Mikutel (born January 3, 1950) is an American politician who served in the Connecticut House of Representatives from the 45th district from 1993 to 2015.
