= Ed Jutila =

American politician

Member of the Connecticut House of Representatives from the 37th district
- In office January 3, 2005 – January 4, 2017
- Preceded by: Gary Orefice
- Succeeded by: Holly Cheeseman

Personal details
- Born: April 16, 1955 (age 71) East Lyme, Connecticut
- Party: Democratic
- Education: University of Connecticut

Ed Jutila is a former American politician who served in the Connecticut House of Representatives for the 37th district in from 2005 until 2017.

== Political career ==
Ed Jutila served as the Democratic state representative for Connecticut’s 37th District (East Lyme and Salem) from 2005 to 2017. He was the Assistant Majority Leader and chaired the Government Administration and Elections Committee during his tenure. He also served on the Public Safety and Security and Transportation Committees, advocating for infrastructure, public safety, and election reforms. Jutila chose not to seek re-election in 2016. Before his state-level service, Jutila was a member of the East Lyme Board of Selectmen.

== Personal life ==
A graduate of East Lyme High School, Jutila earned his bachelor's and law degrees from the University of Connecticut.
