= 2018 Connecticut House of Representatives election =

- November 6, 2018

All 151 seats in the Connecticut House of Representatives 76 seats needed for a majority
	Majority party	Minority party
Leader	Joe Aresimowicz	Themis Klarides
Party	Democratic	Republican
Leader's seat	30th District	114th District
Last election	79	72
Seats before	80	71
Seats won	92	59
Seat change	▲12	▼12
Popular vote	730,652	603,122
Percentage	54.60%	45.07%
- Results by district Democratic gain Republican gain Democratic hold Republican hold
Speaker before election
Joe Aresimowicz
Democratic
Elected Speaker
Joe Aresimowicz
Democratic

The 2018 Connecticut House of Representatives election was held on Tuesday, November 6, 2018, to elect members to the Connecticut House of Representatives, one from each of the state's 151 General Assembly districts. The date of this the election corresponded with other elections in the state, including ones for governor, U.S. Senate, and the Connecticut State Senate. Democrats retained control of the House of Representatives, winning 92 seats to the Republicans 59.

Representatives elected would serve a two-year term, beginning in January 2019.

== Retirements ==
17 incumbents did not seek re-election in 2018.

=== Democrats ===
1. District 12: Kelly Juleson-Scopino retired.
2. District 29: Antonio Guerrera retired to run for State Senate.
3. District 43: Diana Urban retired.
4. District 51: Daniel Rovero retired.
5. District 73: Jeffrey J. Berger retired.
6. District 100: Matt Lesser retired to run for 2018.
7. District 102: Lonnie Reed retired.
8. District 104: Linda Gentile retired.
9. District 140: Bruce Morris retired.
10. District 147: William Tong retired to run for Attorney General.

=== Republicans ===
1. District 13: Mark Tweedie retired.
2. District 17: Timothy LeGeyt retired.
3. District 31: Prasad Srinivasan retired to run for Governor.
4. District 34: Melissa Ziobron retired.
5. District 45: Kevin Skulczyck retired to run for state senate.
6. District 80: Robert Sampson retired to run for state senate.
7. District 119: Pam Staneski retired to run for state senate.

== Predictions ==
Source	Ranking	As of
Governing	Lean D	October 8, 2018

== Special elections ==
=== District 115 ===
February 28, 2017 Connecticut's 115th State House district special election
Party	Candidate	Votes	%
Democratic	Dorinda Keenan Borer	1,973	64.35%
Republican	Edward Granfield	1,093	35.65%
Total votes		3,066	100.00%
Democratic hold			

=== District 7 ===
April 25, 2017 Connecticut's 7th State House district special election
Party	Candidate	Votes	%
Working Families	Joshua Malik Hall	625	41.1%
Democratic	Rickey Pinckey Sr.	512	33.7%
Independent	Kenneth Green	367	24.1%
Write-in	Giselle Gigi Jacobs	17	1.1%
Total votes		1,521	100.00%

=== District 15 ===
January 9, 2018 Connecticut's 15th State House district special election
Party	Candidate	Votes	%
Democratic	Bobby Gibson	922	51.9%
Independent Democratic	Joseph M. Suggs Jr.	854	48.1%
Total votes		1,776	100.00%
Democratic hold			

== Results ==
↓
92	59
Democratic	Republican

Parties	Candidates	Seats				Popular vote		
Parties	Candidates	2016	2018	+/-	Strength	Vote	%	Change
Democratic	146	80	92	▲12	60.92%	730,652	54.60%	▲7.50%
Republican	133	71	59	▼12	39.08%	603,122	45.07%	▼6.71%
Libertarian	4	0	0	Steady	0.00%	1,692	0.13%	▲0.04%
Working Families	2	0	0	Steady	0.00%	900	0.07%	▼0.15%
Independent Party	3	0	0	Steady	0.00%	851	0.06%	▼0.11%
Green	4	0	0	Steady	0.00%	450	0.03%	▼0.31%
Unaffiliated/ Write-ins	6	0	0	Steady	0.00%	475	0.03%	▼0.26%
Total	278	151	151		100.00%	1,338,142	100.00%	100.00%

House seats
Democratic	60.92%
Republican	39.08%

Popular vote
Democratic	54.60%
Republican	45.07%

== Election results ==
=== District 1 ===
Incumbent Democrat Matthew Ritter ran unopposed in the Connecticut House of Representatives District 1 general election.

2018 Connecticut State House of Representatives election, District 1
Party	Candidate	Votes	%
Democratic	Matthew Ritter (Incumbent)	4,419	100.00%
Total votes		4,419	100.00%
Democratic hold			

=== District 2 ===
2018 Connecticut State House of Representatives election, District 2
Party	Candidate	Votes	%
Democratic	Raghib Allie-Brennan	5,245	50.6%
Working Families	Raghib Allie-Brennan	264	2.5%
Total	Raghib Allie-Brennan	5,509	53.1%
Republican	William Duff	4,623	44.6%
Independent Party	William Duff	240	2.3%
Total	William Duff (Incumbent)	4,863	46.9%
Total votes		10,372	100%
Democratic gain from Republican			

=== District 3 ===
2018 Connecticut State House of Representatives election, District 3
Party	Candidate	Votes	%
Democratic	Minnie Gonzalez (Incumbent)	2,975	100.00%
Total votes		2,975	100.00%
Democratic hold			

=== District 4 ===
2018 Connecticut State House of Representatives election, District 4
Party	Candidate	Votes	%
Democratic	Julio Concepcion (Incumbent)	2,733	79.3%
Republican	Bryan C. Nelson	335	9.7
Working Families	Kennard Ray	321	9.3%
Green	Mary L. Sanders	59	1.7%
Total votes		10,372	100%
Democratic hold			

=== District 5 ===
2018 Connecticut State House of Representatives election, District 5
Party	Candidate	Votes	%
Democratic	Brandon McGee (Incumbent)	6,474	85%
Republican	Charles Jackson	1,144	15%
Total votes		7,618	100.00%
Democratic hold			

=== District 6 ===
2018 Connecticut State House of Representatives election, District 6
Party	Candidate	Votes	%
Democratic	Edwin Vargas	3,563	84.4%
Working Families	Edwin Vargas	142	3.4%
Total	Edwin Vargas (Incumbent)	3,705	87.8%
Republican	William Duff	516	12.2%
Total votes		4,221	100%
Democratic hold			

=== District 7 ===
2018 Connecticut State House of Representatives election, District 7
Party	Candidate	Votes	%
Democratic	Joshua Malik Hall	4,098	94.6%
Working Families	Joshua Malik Hall	143	3.3%
Total	Joshua Malik Hall (Incumbent)	4,241	97.9%
Petitioning	Gisele Gigi Jacobs	92	2.1%
Total votes		4,333	100%
Democratic hold			

=== District 8 ===
2018 Connecticut State House of Representatives election, District 8
Party	Candidate	Votes	%
Republican	Tim Ackert (Incumbent)	7,610	62.3%
Democratic	Brenda Falusi	4,597	37.7%
Total votes		12,207	100.00%
Republican hold			

=== District 9 ===
2018 Connecticut State House of Representatives election, District 9
Party	Candidate	Votes	%
Democratic	Jason Rojas (Incumbent)	6,042	88%
Libertarian	Anthony Armetta	821	12%
Total votes		6,863	100.00%
Democratic hold			

=== District 10 ===
2018 Connecticut State House of Representatives election, District 10
Party	Candidate	Votes	%
Democratic	Henry Genga (Incumbent)	5,236	100.00%
Total votes		5,236	100.00%
Democratic hold			

=== District 11 ===
2018 Connecticut State House of Representatives election, District 11
Party	Candidate	Votes	%
Democratic	Jeffrey Currey (Incumbent)	4,547	100.00%
Total votes		4,547	100.00%
Democratic hold			

=== District 12 ===
2018 Connecticut State House of Representatives election, District 12
Party	Candidate	Votes	%
Democratic	Geoff Luxenberg	5,327	59.2%
Working Families	Geoff Luxenberg	329	3.7%
Total	Geoff Luxenberg (Incumbent)	5,656	62.8%
Republican	Thomas J. Tierney	3,345	37.2%
Total votes		9,001	100%
Democratic hold			

=== District 13 ===
2018 Connecticut State House of Representatives election, District 13
Party	Candidate	Votes	%
Democratic	Jason Doucette	5,799	56.1%
Working Families	Jason Doucette	232	2.2%
Total	Jason Doucette	6,031	58.3%
Republican	Jennifer Fiereck	4,053	39.2%
Independent Party	Jennifer Fiereck	255	2.5%
Total	Jennifer Fiereck	4,308	41.7%
Total votes		10,339	100%
Democratic gain from Republican			

=== District 14 ===
2018 Connecticut State House of Representatives election, District 14
Party	Candidate	Votes	%
Republican	Tom Delnicki	5,929	51.9%
Independent Party	Tom Delnicki	339	3%
Total	Tom Delnicki (Incumbent)	6,268	54.9%
Democratic	John P. Pelkey	4,976	43.5%
Working Families	John P. Pelkey	187	1.6%
Total	John P. Pelkey	5,163	45.1%
Total votes		11,431	100%
Republican hold			

=== District 15 ===
2018 Connecticut State House of Representatives election, District 15
Party	Candidate	Votes	%
Democratic	Bobby Gibson	9,268	95.6%
Working Families	Bobby Gibson	428	4.4%
Total	Bobby Gibson (Incumbent)	9,696	100%
Total votes		9,696	100%
Democratic hold			

=== District 16 ===
2018 Connecticut State House of Representatives election, District 16
Party	Candidate	Votes	%
Democratic	John Hampton (Incumbent)	7,625	59.4%
Republican	Tim Walczak	4,935	38.5%
Independent Party	Tim Walczak	218	1.7%
Total	Tim Walczak	5,135	40.2%
Petitioning	Robert H. Kalechman	51	0.4%
Total votes		12,829	100%
Democratic hold			

=== District 17 ===
2018 Connecticut State House of Representatives election, District 17
Party	Candidate	Votes	%
Republican	Leslee Hill	6,004	48.3%
Independent Party	Leslee Hill	274	2.2%
Total	Leslee Hill	6,278	50.5%
Democratic	Eleni Kavros DeGraw	5,929	47.7%
Working Families	Eleni Kavros DeGraw	230	1.8%
Total	Eleni Kavros DeGraw	6,159	49.5%
Total votes		12,437	100%
Republican hold			

=== District 18 ===
2018 Connecticut State House of Representatives election, District 18
Party	Candidate	Votes	%
Democratic	Jillian Gilchrest	7,608	71.9%
Republican	Mary M. Fay	2,783	26.3%
Independent Party	Mary M. Fay	194	1.8%
Total	Mary M. Fay	2,977	28.1%
Total votes		10,585	100%
Democratic hold			

=== District 19 ===
2018 Connecticut State House of Representatives election, District 19
Party	Candidate	Votes	%
Democratic	Derek Slap (Incumbent)	9,515	100.00%
Total votes		9,515	100.00%
Democratic hold			

=== District 20 ===
2018 Connecticut State House of Representatives election, District 20
Party	Candidate	Votes	%
Democratic	Joseph Verrengia (Incumbent)	7,220	100.00%
Total votes		7,220	100.00%
Democratic hold			

=== District 21 ===
2018 Connecticut State House of Representatives election, District 21
Party	Candidate	Votes	%
Democratic	Mike Demicco	6,323	54%
Working Families	Mike Demicco	290	2.4%
Total	Mike Demicco (Incumbent)	6,613	56.4%
Republican	Chris Forster	4,918	42%
Independent Party	Chris Forster	187	1.6%
Total	Chris Forster	4,308	43.6%
Total votes		11,718	100%
Democratic hold			

=== District 22 ===
2018 Connecticut State House of Representatives election, District 22
Party	Candidate	Votes	%
Republican	William Petit	5,297	60.7%
Independent Party	William Petit	441	5.1%
Total	William Petit (Incumbent)	5,738	65.8%
Democratic	Richard Ireland Jr.	2,989	34.2%
Total votes		8,727	100%
Republican hold			

=== District 23 ===
2018 Connecticut State House of Representatives election, District 23
Party	Candidate	Votes	%
Republican	Devin Carney	6,854	53.1%
Independent Party	Devin Carney	308	2.4%
Total	Devin Carney (Incumbent)	7,162	55.5%
Democratic	Matt Pugliese	5,566	43.1%
Working Families	Matt Pugliese	184	1.4%
Total	Matt Pugliese	5,750	44.5%
Total votes		12,912	100%
Republican hold			

=== District 24 ===
2018 Connecticut State House of Representatives election, District 24
Party	Candidate	Votes	%
Democratic	Rick Lopes	3,945	56.7%
Working Families	Rick Lopes	310	4.5%
Total	Rick Lopes (Incumbent)	4,255	61.2%
Republican	Sharon Beloin-Saavedra	2,699	38.8%
Total votes		6,954	100%
Democratic hold			

=== District 25 ===
2018 Connecticut State House of Representatives election, District 25
Party	Candidate	Votes	%
Democratic	Bobby Sanchez	3,075	91.3%
Working Families	Bobby Sanchez	216	6.4%
Total	Bobby Sanchez (Incumbent)	3,291	97.7%
Petitioning	Alfred P. Mayo	76	2.3%
Total votes		3,367	100%
Democratic hold			

=== District 26 ===
2018 Connecticut State House of Representatives election, District 26
Party	Candidate	Votes	%
Democratic	Peter Tercyak	3,440	64.9%
Working Families	Peter Tercyak	258	4.9%
Total	Peter Tercyak (Incumbent)	3,698	69.8%
Republican	Tremell J. Collins	1,601	30.2%
Total votes		5,299	100%
Democratic hold			

=== District 27 ===
2018 Connecticut State House of Representatives election, District 27
Party	Candidate	Votes	%
Democratic	Gary Turco	5,215	47.8%
Working Families	Gary Turco	276	2.5%
Total	Gary Turco	5,491	50.3%
Republican	Gary Byron	5,171	47.4%
Independent Party	Gary Byron	254	2.3%
Total	Gary Byron (Incumbent)	5,425	49.7%
Total votes		10,916	100%
Democratic gain from Republican			

=== District 28 ===
2018 Connecticut State House of Representatives election, District 28
Party	Candidate	Votes	%
Democratic	Russell Morin	6,273	54.9%
Working Families	Russell Morin	290	2.5%
Total	Russell Morin (Incumbent)	6,563	57.4%
Republican	Michael Hurley	4,691	41.1%
Independent Party	Michael Hurley	175	1.5%
Total	Michael Hurley	4,866	42.6%
Total votes		11,429	100%
Democratic hold			

=== District 29 ===
2018 Connecticut State House of Representatives election, District 29
Party	Candidate	Votes	%
Democratic	Kerry Wood	5,817	55.7%
Republican	Andrew A. Lanciotto	4,622	44.3%
Total votes		10,439	100.00%
Democratic hold			

=== District 30 ===
2018 Connecticut State House of Representatives election, District 30
Party	Candidate	Votes	%
Democratic	Joe Aresimowicz	5,499	46.8%
Working Families	Joe Aresimowicz	399	3.4%
Total	Joe Aresimowicz (Incumbent)	5,898	50.2%
Republican	Michael Gagliardi	5,848	49.8%
Total votes		11,746	100%
Democratic hold			

=== District 31 ===
2018 Connecticut State House of Representatives election, District 31
Party	Candidate	Votes	%
Democratic	Jill Barry	6,303	48.6%
Working Families	Jill Barry	237	1.8%
Total	Jill Barry	6,540	50.4%
Republican	Lillian Tanski	6,192	47.7%
Independent Party	Lillian Tanski	243	1.9%
Total	Lillian Tanski	6,435	49.6%
Total votes		12,975	100%
Democratic gain from Republican			

=== District 32 ===
2018 Connecticut State House of Representatives election, District 32
Party	Candidate	Votes	%
Republican	Christie Carpino	6,298	54.7%
Independent Party	Christie Carpino	286	2.5%
Total	Christie Carpino (Incumbent)	6,584	57.2%
Democratic	Laurel Steinhauser	4,655	40.5%
Working Families	Laurel Steinhauser	266	2.3%
Total	Laurel Steinhauser	4,921	42.8%
Total votes		11,505	100%
Republican hold			

=== District 33 ===
2018 Connecticut State House of Representatives election, District 33
Party	Candidate	Votes	%
Democratic	Joseph Serra (Incumbent)	5,356	62.1%
Republican	Linda Szynkowicz	3,096	35.9%
Independent Party	Linda Szynkowicz	174	2%
Total	Linda Szynkowicz	3,270	37.9%
Total votes		8,626	100%
Democratic hold			

=== District 34 ===
2018 Connecticut State House of Representatives election, District 34
Party	Candidate	Votes	%
Republican	Irene Haines	5,631	49.3%
Independent Party	Irene Haines	305	2.7%
Total	Irene Haines (Incumbent)	5,936	52%
Democratic	Theresa Govert	5,183	45.4%
Working Families	Theresa Govert	295	2.6%
Total	Theresa Govert	5,478	48%
Total votes		11,414	100%
Republican hold			

=== District 35 ===
2018 Connecticut State House of Representatives election, District 35
Party	Candidate	Votes	%
Republican	Jesse MacLachlan	5,979	50.3%
Independent Party	Jesse MacLachlan	261	2.2%
Total	Jesse MacLachlan (Incumbent)	6,240	52.5%
Democratic	Jason Adler	5,461	46%
Green	Madeleine Leveille	181	1.5%
Total votes		11,882	100%
Republican hold			

=== District 36 ===
2018 Connecticut State House of Representatives election, District 36
Party	Candidate	Votes	%
Democratic	Christine Palm	6,338	49%
Working Families	Christine Palm	234	1.8%
Total	Christine Palm	6,527	50.8%
Republican	Robert Siegrist	6,078	47%
Independent Party	Robert Siegrist	282	2.2%
Total	Robert Siegrist (Incumbent)	6,360	49.2%
Total votes		12,932	100%
Democratic gain from Republican			

=== District 37 ===
2018 Connecticut State House of Representatives election, District 37
Party	Candidate	Votes	%
Republican	Holly Cheeseman	5,473	48.8%
Independent Party	Holly Cheeseman	293	2.6%
Total	Holly Cheeseman (Incumbent)	5,766	51.4%
Democratic	Hugh McKenney	5,244	46.7%
Working Families	Hugh McKenney	212	1.9%
Total	Hugh McKenney	5,456	48.6%
Total votes		11,222	100%
Republican hold			

=== District 38 ===
2018 Connecticut State House of Representatives election, District 38
Party	Candidate	Votes	%
Republican	Kathleen McCarty	5,362	48.5%
Independent Party	Kathleen McCarty	339	3.1%
Total	Kathleen McCarty (Incumbent)	5,701	51.6%
Democratic	Baird Welch-Collins	5,088	46.7%
Green	Baird Welch-Collins	262	1.9%
Total	Baird Welch-Collins	5,350	48.4%
Total votes		11,051	100%
Republican hold			

=== District 39 ===
2018 Connecticut State House of Representatives election, District 39
Party	Candidate	Votes	%
Democratic	Chris Soto	4,136	94%
Green	Chris Soto	265	6%
Total	Chris Soto (Incumbent)	4,401	100%
Total votes		4,401	100%
Democratic hold			

=== District 40 ===
2018 Connecticut State House of Representatives election, District 40
Party	Candidate	Votes	%
Democratic	Christine Conley	3,572	54.7%
Working Families	Christine Conley	243	3.7%
Total	Christine Conley (Incumbent)	3,815	58.4%
Republican	John F. Scott	2,557	39.1%
Independent Party	John F. Scott	163	2.5%
Total	John F. Scott	2,720	41.6%
Total votes		6,535	100%
Democratic hold			

=== District 41 ===
2018 Connecticut State House of Representatives election, District 41
Party	Candidate	Votes	%
Democratic	Joe de la Cruz	5,526	61.8%
Working Families	Joe de la Cruz	302	3.4%
Total	Joe de la Cruz (Incumbent)	5,828	65.2%
Republican	Kenneth W. Richards	2,961	33.2%
Independent Party	Kenneth W. Richards	145	1.6%
Total	Kenneth W. Richards	3,106	34.8%
Total votes		8,934	100%
Democratic hold			

=== District 42 ===
2018 Connecticut State House of Representatives election, District 42
Party	Candidate	Votes	%
Republican	Mike France	4,810	53.7%
Independent Party	Mike France	275	3.1%
Total	Mike France (Incumbent)	5,085	56.7%
Democratic	Elizabeth Schwebel	3,616	40.3%
Working Families	Elizabeth Schwebel	264	2.9%
Total	Elizabeth Schwebel	3,880	43.3%
Total votes		8,965	100%
Republican hold			

=== District 43 ===
2018 Connecticut State House of Representatives election, District 43
Party	Candidate	Votes	%
Democratic	Kate Rotella	6,369	55%
Republican	Shaun Mastroianni	4,913	42.4%
Independent Party	Shaun Mastroianni	307	2.6%
Total	Shaun Mastroianni	5,220	45%
Total votes		11,589	100%
Democratic hold			

=== District 44 ===
2018 Connecticut State House of Representatives election, District 44
Party	Candidate	Votes	%
Republican	Anne Dauphinais	4,441	57.4%
Independent Party	Anne Dauphinais	303	3.9%
Total	Anne Dauphinais (Incumbent)	4,744	61.3%
Democratic	Elizabeth Schwebel	2,774	35.8%
Working Families	Elizabeth Schwebel	224	2.9%
Total	Elizabeth Schwebel	2,988	38.7%
Total votes		7,742	100%
Republican hold			

=== District 45 ===
2018 Connecticut State House of Representatives election, District 45
Party	Candidate	Votes	%
Republican	Brian Lanoue	4,410	50.4%
Independent Party	Brian Lanoue	306	3.5%
Total	Brian Lanoue	4,716	53.9%
Democratic	Steven Mikutel	4,035	46.1%
Total votes		8,751	100%
Republican hold			

=== District 46 ===
2018 Connecticut State House of Representatives election, District 46
Party	Candidate	Votes	%
Democratic	Emmett Riley	3,422	61%
Working Families	Emmett Riley	199	3.5%
Total	Emmett Riley (Incumbent)	3,621	64.5%
Republican	Andrew Lockwood	1,846	32.9%
Independent Party	Andrew Lockwood	144	2.6%
Total	Andrew Lockwood	1,990	35.5%
Total votes		5,611	100%
Democratic hold			

=== District 47 ===
2018 Connecticut State House of Representatives election, District 47
Party	Candidate	Votes	%
Republican	Doug Dubitsky	5,829	53.8%
Independent Party	Doug Dubitsky	328	3%
Total	Doug Dubitsky (Incumbent)	6,157	56.8%
Democratic	Kate Donnelly	4,343	40.1%
Working Families	Kate Donnelly	335	3.1%
Total	Kate Donnelly	4,678	43.2%
Total votes		10,835	100%
Republican hold			

=== District 48 ===
2018 Connecticut State House of Representatives election, District 48
Party	Candidate	Votes	%
Democratic	Emmett Riley	3,422	61%
Working Families	Emmett Riley	199	3.5%
Total	Emmett Riley (Incumbent)	3,621	64.5%
Republican	Andrew Lockwood	1,846	32.9%
Independent Party	Andrew Lockwood	144	2.6%
Total	Andrew Lockwood	1,990	35.5%
Total votes		5,611	100%
Democratic hold			

=== District 49 ===
2018 Connecticut State House of Representatives election, District 49
Party	Candidate	Votes	%
Democratic	Susan Johnson	4,325	88.2%
Working Families	Susan Johnson	579	11.8%
Total	Susan Johnson (Incumbent)	4,904	100%
Total votes		4,904	100%
Democratic hold			

=== District 50 ===
2018 Connecticut State House of Representatives election, District 50
Party	Candidate	Votes	%
Democratic	Pat Boyd (Incumbent)	5,662	56.9%
Republican	AJ Kerouac	4,282	43.1%
Total votes		9,944	100.00%
Democratic hold			

=== District 51 ===
2018 Connecticut State House of Representatives election, District 51
Party	Candidate	Votes	%
Republican	Rick Hayes	4,110	49.5%
Independent Party	Rick Hayes	318	3.8%
Total	Rick Hayes	4,428	53.3%
Democratic	Larry Groh	3,577	43.1%
Working Families	Larry Groh	300	3.6%
Total	Larry Groh	3,877	46.7%
Total votes		8,305	100%
Republican gain from Democratic			

=== District 52 ===
2018 Connecticut State House of Representatives election, District 52
Party	Candidate	Votes	%
Republican	Kurt Vail	5,433	58%
Independent Party	Kurt Vail	248	2.6%
Total	Kurt Vail (Incumbent)	5,681	60.6%
Democratic	David Walsh	3,307	35.3%
Working Families	David Walsh	213	2.3%
Total	David Walsh	3,520	37.6%
Petitioning	Linda Louise LaCasse	166	1.8%
Total votes		9,367	100%
Republican hold			

=== District 53 ===
2018 Connecticut State House of Representatives election, District 53
Party	Candidate	Votes	%
Democratic	Patricia Wilson Pheanious	5,508	49%
Working Families	Patricia Wilson Pheanious	368	3.3%
Total	Patricia Wilson Pheanious	5,876	52.3%
Republican	Sam Belsito	5,110	45.4%
Independent Party	Sam Belsito	259	2.3%
Total	Sam Belsito (Incumbent)	5,369	47.7%
Total votes		11,245	100%
Democratic gain from Republican			

=== District 54 ===
2018 Connecticut State House of Representatives election, District 54
Party	Candidate	Votes	%
Democratic	Gregory Haddad	5,956	92.6%
Working Families	Gregory Haddad	473	7.4%
Total	Gregory Haddad (Incumbent)	6,429	100%
Total votes		6,429	100%
Democratic hold			

=== District 55 ===
2018 Connecticut State House of Representatives election, District 55
Party	Candidate	Votes	%
Republican	Robin Green (Incumbent)	6,668	54.7%
Democratic	Tiffany Thiele	5,219	42.8%
Working Families	Tiffany Thiele	313	2.5%
Total	Tiffany Thiele	5,532	45.3%
Total votes		12,200	100.00%
Republican hold			

=== District 56 ===
2018 Connecticut State House of Representatives election, District 56
Party	Candidate	Votes	%
Democratic	Michael Winkler	4,846	54.1%
Working Families	Michael Winkler	304	3.4%
Total	Michael Winkler (Incumbent)	5,150	57.5%
Republican	Laura B. Bush	3,602	40.2%
Independent Party	Laura B. Bush	204	2.3%
Total	Laura B. Bush	3,806	42.5%
Total votes		8,956	100%
Democratic hold			

=== District 57 ===
2018 Connecticut State House of Representatives election, District 50
Party	Candidate	Votes	%
Republican	Christopher Davis (Incumbent)	6,538	62.2%
Democratic	Dennis Milanovich	3,978	37.8%
Total votes		10,516	100.00%
Republican hold			

=== District 58 ===
2018 Connecticut State House of Representatives election, District 58
Party	Candidate	Votes	%
Democratic	Tom Arnone	4,079	51.1%
Working Families	Tom Arnone	230	2.9%
Total	Tom Arnone	4,309	54%
Republican	Greg Stokes	3,438	43.1%
Independent Party	Greg Stokes	233	2.9%
Total	Greg Stokes (Incumbent)	3,671	46%
Total votes		7,980	100%
Democratic gain from Republican			

=== District 59 ===
2018 Connecticut State House of Representatives election, District 59
Party	Candidate	Votes	%
Republican	Carol Hall	4,411	52.1%
Independent Party	Carol Hall	242	2.8%
Total	Carol Hall (Incumbent)	4,653	54.9%
Democratic	Tony DiPace	3,608	42.6%
Working Families	Tony DiPace	211	2.5%
Total	Tony DiPace	3,819	45.1%
Total votes		8,427	100%
Republican hold			

=== District 60 ===
2018 Connecticut State House of Representatives election, District 60
Party	Candidate	Votes	%
Democratic	Jane Garibay	5,454	52.9%
Republican	Scott Storms	4,606	44.6%
Independent Party	Scott Storms	257	2.5%
Total	Scott Storms (Incumbent)	4,863	47.1%
Total votes		10,317	100%
Democratic gain from Republican			

=== District 61 ===
2018 Connecticut State House of Representatives election, District 61
Party	Candidate	Votes	%
Republican	Tami Zawistowski	5,926	57.6%
Independent Party	Tami Zawistowski	286	2.8%
Total	Tami Zawistowski (Incumbent)	6,212	60.4%
Democratic	Jack Henrie	4,078	39.6%
Total votes		10,290	100%
Republican hold			

=== District 62 ===
2018 Connecticut State House of Representatives election, District 62
Party	Candidate	Votes	%
Republican	William Simanski	6,871	54.7%
Independent Party	William Simanski	273	2.2%
Total	William Simanski (Incumbent)	7,144	56.9%
Democratic	Amanda Webster	5,092	40.5%
Working Families	Amanda Webster	325	2.6%
Total	Amanda Webster	5,417	43.1%
Total votes		12,561	100%
Republican hold			

=== District 63 ===
2018 Connecticut State House of Representatives election, District 63
Party	Candidate	Votes	%
Republican	Jay Case	5,868	61.2%
Independent Party	Jay Case	283	2.9%
Total	Jay Case (Incumbent)	6,151	60.4%
Democratic	Althea Candy	3,443	35.9%
Total votes		9,594	100%
Republican hold			

=== District 64 ===
2018 Connecticut State House of Representatives election, District 58
Party	Candidate	Votes	%
Democratic	Maria Horn	5,665	48.6%
Working Families	Maria Horn	212	1.8%
Total	Maria Horn	5,877	50.4%
Republican	Brian Ohler	5,455	46.8%
Independent Party	Brian Ohler	332	2.8%
Total	Brian Ohler (Incumbent)	5,787	49.6%
Total votes		11,664	100%
Democratic gain from Republican			

=== District 65 ===
2018 Connecticut State House of Representatives election, District 65
Party	Candidate	Votes	%
Democratic	Michelle Cook	3,388	47.7%
Working Families	Michelle Cook	273	3.8%
Total	Michelle Cook (Incumbent)	3,661	51.5%
Republican	Molly Spino	3,214	45.2%
Independent Party	Molly Spino	143	2.1%
Total	Molly Spino	3,357	47.3%
Libertarian	Kent Johnson	85	1.2%
Total votes		7,103	100%
Democratic hold			

=== District 66 ===
2018 Connecticut State House of Representatives election, District 66
Party	Candidate	Votes	%
Republican	David Wilson	6,900	55%
Independent Party	David Wilson	253	2%
Total	David Wilson (Incumbent)	7,153	57%
Democratic	Alex Larsson	5,172	41.2%
Working Families	Alex Larsson	222	1.8%
Total	Alex Larsson	5,394	43%
Total votes		12,547	100%
Republican hold			

=== District 67 ===
2018 Connecticut State House of Representatives election, District 67
Party	Candidate	Votes	%
Republican	Bill Buckbee	5,301	54%
Independent Party	Bill Buckbee	362	3.7%
Total	Bill Buckbee (Incumbent)	5,663	57.7%
Democratic	Thomas O'Brien	3,911	39.9%
Working Families	Thomas O'Brien	239	2.4%
Total	Thomas O'Brien	4,150	42.3%
Total votes		9,813	100%
Republican hold			

=== District 68 ===
2018 Connecticut State House of Representatives election, District 68
Party	Candidate	Votes	%
Republican	Joseph Polletta	7,261	69%
Democratic	Jeff Desmarais	2,949	28%
Working Families	Jeff Desmarais	166	1.6%
Independent Party	Jeff Desmarais	148	1.4%
Total	Jeff Desmarais	3,263	31%
Total votes		10,524	100.00%
Republican hold			

=== District 69 ===
2018 Connecticut State House of Representatives election, District 69
Party	Candidate	Votes	%
Republican	Arthur O'Neill (Incumbent)	7,085	59.9%
Democratic	Greg Cava	4,501	38%
Working Families	Greg Cava	244	2.1%
Total	Greg Cava	4,745	40.1%
Total votes		11,830	100.00%
Republican hold			

=== District 70 ===
2018 Connecticut State House of Representatives election, District 70
Party	Candidate	Votes	%
Republican	Rosa Rebimbas (Incumbent)	5,901	100.00%
Total votes		5,901	100.00%
Republican hold			

=== District 71 ===
2018 Connecticut State House of Representatives election, District 71
Party	Candidate	Votes	%
Republican	Anthony D'Amelio (Incumbent)	5,018	59%
Democratic	Stephen Ferrucci III	3,978	37.1%
Independent Party	Danielle Albert	334	3.9%
Total votes		8,510	100.00%
Republican hold			

=== District 72 ===
2018 Connecticut State House of Representatives election, District 72
Party	Candidate	Votes	%
Democratic	Larry Butler	3,362	74.1%
Republican	Michael Cervellino III	1,072	23.6%
Independent Party	Michael Cervellino III	104	2.3%
Total	Michael Cervellino III	1,176	25.9%
Total votes		4,538	100%
Democratic hold			

=== District 73 ===
2018 Connecticut State House of Representatives election, District 73
Party	Candidate	Votes	%
Democratic	Ronald Napoli	3,828	54.3%
Working Families	Ronald Napoli	198	2.8%
Total	Ronald Napoli	4,026	57.1%
Republican	Steven Giacomi	2,883	40.9%
Independent Party	Steven Giacomi	142	2%
Total	Steven Giacomi	3,025	42.9%
Total votes		7,051	100%
Democratic hold			

=== District 74 ===
2018 Connecticut State House of Representatives election, District 74
Party	Candidate	Votes	%
Republican	Stephanie Cummings	3,168	50.4%
Independent Party	Stephanie Cummings	241	3.8%
Total	Stephanie Cummings (Incumbent)	3,409	54.2%
Democratic	Wendy Tyson-Wood	2,877	45.8%
Total votes		6,286	100%
Republican hold			

=== District 75 ===
2018 Connecticut State House of Representatives election, District 75
Party	Candidate	Votes	%
Democratic	Geraldo Reyes (Incumbent)	2,491	91.1%
Independent Party	Ted Derouin	243	8.9%
Total votes		2,734	100.00%
Democratic hold			

=== District 76 ===
2018 Connecticut State House of Representatives election, District 71
Party	Candidate	Votes	%
Republican	John Piscopo (Incumbent)	7,615	64.5%
Democratic	Paul Honig	4,190	35.5%
Total votes		11,805	100.00%
Republican hold			

=== District 77 ===
2018 Connecticut State House of Representatives election, District 77
Party	Candidate	Votes	%
Republican	Cara Pavalock-D'Amato	4,640	49.9%
Independent Party	Cara Pavalock-D'Amato	261	2.8%
Total	Cara Pavalock-D'Amato (Incumbent)	4,901	52.7%
Democratic	Kevin Fuller	4,396	47.3%
Total votes		9,297	100%
Republican hold			

=== District 78 ===
2018 Connecticut State House of Representatives election, District 78
Party	Candidate	Votes	%
Republican	Whit Betts	5,818	64.7%
Independent Party	Whit Betts	268	3%
Total	Whit Betts (Incumbent)	6,086	67.7%
Democratic	Allen Marko	2,900	32.3%
Total votes		8,986	100%
Republican hold			

=== District 79 ===
2018 Connecticut State House of Representatives election, District 79
Party	Candidate	Votes	%
Democratic	Christopher Ziogas (Incumbent)	3,927	54%
Republican	David Rackliffe	3,156	43.5%
Independent Party	David Rackliffe	183	2.5%
Total	David Rackliffe	3,339	46%
Total votes		7,266	100%
Democratic hold			

=== District 80 ===
2018 Connecticut State House of Representatives election, District 80
Party	Candidate	Votes	%
Republican	Gale Mastrofrancesco	7,089	65.8%
Independent Party	Gale Mastrofrancesco	289	2.7%
Total	Gale Mastrofrancesco	7,378	68.5%
Democratic	David Borzellino	3,338	31%
Petitioning	Benjamin Taylor Conroy	59	0.5%
Total votes		10,775	100%
Republican hold			

=== District 81 ===
2018 Connecticut State House of Representatives election, District 81
Party	Candidate	Votes	%
Republican	John Fusco	5,586	53.8%
Independent Party	John Fusco	273	2.6%
Total	John Fusco (Incumbent)	5,859	56.4%
Democratic	Ryan Rogers	4,286	41.2%
Working Families	Ryan Rogers	252	2.4%
Total	Ryan Rogers	4,538	43.6%
Total votes		10,397	100%
Republican hold			

=== District 82 ===
2018 Connecticut State House of Representatives election, District 82
Party	Candidate	Votes	%
Democratic	Emil Altobello (Incumbent)	5,401	59.4%
Republican	Ernestine Holloway	3,699	40.6%
Total votes		2,734	100.00%
Democratic hold			

=== District 83 ===
2018 Connecticut State House of Representatives election, District 83
Party	Candidate	Votes	%
Democratic	Catherine Abercrombie (Incumbent)	4,765	51.1%
Republican	Lou Arata	4,251	45.6%
Independent Party	Lou Arata	199	2.1%
Total	Lou Arata	4,450	47.7%
Libertarian	Roger Misbach	117	1.2%
Total votes		9,332	100%
Democratic hold			

=== District 84 ===
2018 Connecticut State House of Representatives election, District 84
Party	Candidate	Votes	%
Democratic	Hilda Santiago (Incumbent)	3,515	100%
Total votes		3,153	100.00%
Democratic hold			

=== District 85 ===
2018 Connecticut State House of Representatives election, District 85
Party	Candidate	Votes	%
Democratic	Mary Mushinsky	4,763	52%
Working Families	Mary Mushinsky	337	3.7%
Total	Mary Mushinsky (Incumbent)	5,100	55.7%
Republican	Dan Crouch	3,857	42.1%
Independent Party	Dan Crouch	194	2.1%
Total	Dan Crouch	4,051	44.3%
Total votes		9,151	100%
Democratic hold			

=== District 86 ===
2018 Connecticut State House of Representatives election, District 86
Party	Candidate	Votes	%
Republican	Vincent Candelora	6,506	59.7%
Independent Party	Vincent Candelora	290	2.7%
Total	Vincent Candelora (Incumbent)	6,796	62.3%
Democratic	Vincent Mase	3,961	36.3%
Green	Colin Souney	144	1.3%
Total votes		10,901	100%
Republican hold			

=== District 87 ===
2018 Connecticut State House of Representatives election, District 87
Party	Candidate	Votes	%
Republican	Dave Yaccarino	7,428	61.5%
Independent Party	Dave Yaccarino	344	2.8%
Total	Dave Yaccarino (Incumbent)	7,772	64.3%
Democratic	Theresa Ranciato-Viele	4,308	35.7%
Total votes		12,080	100%
Republican hold			

=== District 88 ===
2018 Connecticut State House of Representatives election, District 88
Party	Candidate	Votes	%
Democratic	Josh Elliott	6,218	66.5%
Working Families	Josh Elliott	343	3.7%
Total	Josh Elliott (Incumbent)	6,561	70.2%
Republican	Debra Rigney	2,786	29.8%
Total votes		9,347	100%
Democratic hold			

=== District 89 ===
2018 Connecticut State House of Representatives election, District 89
Party	Candidate	Votes	%
Republican	Lezlye Zupkus	7,348	61.3%
Independent Party	Lezlye Zupkus	275	2.3%
Total	Lezlye Zupkus (Incumbent)	7,623	63.6%
Democratic	Anne Harrigan	4,367	36.4%
Total votes		11,990	100%
Republican hold			

=== District 90 ===
2018 Connecticut State House of Representatives election, District 90
Party	Candidate	Votes	%
Republican	Craig Fishbein	5,683	51.3%
Independent Party	Craig Fishbein	246	2.2%
Total	Craig Fishbein (Incumbent)	5,929	53.5%
Democratic	Daniel Fontaine	4,789	43.2%
Working Families	Daniel Fontaine	361	3.3%
Total	Daniel Fontaine	5,150	46.5%
Total votes		11,079	100%
Republican hold			

=== District 91 ===
2018 Connecticut State House of Representatives election, District 91
Party	Candidate	Votes	%
Democratic	Michael D'Agostino (Incumbent)	7,841	92.1%
Libertarian	Gary Walsh	669	7.9%
Total votes		8,510	100.00%
Democratic hold			

=== District 92 ===
2018 Connecticut State House of Representatives election, District 92
Party	Candidate	Votes	%
Democratic	Patricia Dillon	6,221	86.1%
Working Families	Patricia Dillon	344	4.8%
Total	Patricia Dillon (Incumbent)	6,565	90.9%
Republican	Joshua Alan Rose	627	8.7%
Petitioning	Wayne Jackson	31	0.4%
Total votes		7,223	100%
Democratic hold			

=== District 93 ===
2018 Connecticut State House of Representatives election, District 93
Party	Candidate	Votes	%
Democratic	Toni Walker (Incumbent)	4,782	93.9%
Republican	Grant Richardson	310	6.1%
Total votes		5,092	100.00%
Democratic hold			

=== District 94 ===
2018 Connecticut State House of Representatives election, District 94
Party	Candidate	Votes	%
Democratic	Robyn Porter	6,043	86.5%
Working Families	Robyn Porter	199	2.8%
Total	Robyn Porter (Incumbent)	6,242	89.4%
Republican	Jordan Grode	743	10.6%
Total votes		6,985	100%
Democratic hold			

=== District 95 ===
2018 Connecticut State House of Representatives election, District 95
Party	Candidate	Votes	%
Democratic	Juan Candelaria (Incumbent)	3,166	88.2%
Republican	John Carlson	424	11.8%
Total votes		3,590	100.00%
Democratic hold			

=== District 96 ===
2018 Connecticut State House of Representatives election, District 96
Party	Candidate	Votes	%
Democratic	Roland Lemar	6,183	75%
Working Families	Roland Lemar	465	5.6%
Total	Roland Lemar (Incumbent)	6,648	80.6%
Republican	Eric Michael Mastroianni	1,598	19.4%
Total votes		8,264	100%
Democratic hold			

=== District 97 ===
2018 Connecticut State House of Representatives election, District 97
Party	Candidate	Votes	%
Democratic	Alphonse Paolillo (Incumbent)	4,890	80.2%
Republican	Joshua Van Hoesen	1,207	19.8%
Total votes		6,097	100.00%
Democratic hold			

=== District 98 ===
2018 Connecticut State House of Representatives election, District 98
Party	Candidate	Votes	%
Democratic	Sean Scanlon	8,572	90.9%
Working Families	Sean Scanlon	862	9.1%
Total	Sean Scanlon (Incumbent)	9,434	100%
Total votes		9,434	100%
Democratic hold			

=== District 99 ===
2018 Connecticut State House of Representatives election, District 99
Party	Candidate	Votes	%
Democratic	James Albis	4,502	53.6%
Working Families	James Albis	384	4.6%
Total	James Albis (Incumbent)	4,886	58.2%
Republican	Robert Parente	3,407	40.6%
Independent Party	Robert Parente	107	1.2%
Total	Robert Parente	3,514	41.8%
Total votes		8,400	100%
Democratic hold			

=== District 100 ===
2018 Connecticut State House of Representatives election, District 100
Party	Candidate	Votes	%
Democratic	Quentin Phipps	5,033	55.9%
Working Families	Quentin Phipps	443	4.9%
Total	Quentin Phipps	5,476	60.8%
Republican	Anthony Gennaro	3,534	39.2%
Total votes		9,010	100%
Democratic hold			

=== District 101 ===
2018 Connecticut State House of Representatives election, District 101
Party	Candidate	Votes	%
Republican	Noreen Kokoruda	6,009	48.1%
Independent Party	Noreen Kokoruda	250	2%
Total	Noreen Kokoruda (Incumbent)	6,259	50.1%
Democratic	John-Michael Parker	6,241	49.9%
Total votes		12,500	100%
Republican hold			

=== District 102 ===
2018 Connecticut State House of Representatives election, District 102
Party	Candidate	Votes	%
Democratic	Robin Comey	5,856	52.8%
Working Families	Robin Comey	241	2.2%
Total	Robin Comey	4,984	55%
Republican	Robert Imperato	4,753	42.9%
Independent Party	Robert Imperato	231	2.1%
Total	Robert Imperato	4,984	45%
Total votes		11,081	100%
Democratic hold			

=== District 103 ===
2018 Connecticut State House of Representatives election, District 83
Party	Candidate	Votes	%
Democratic	Liz Linehan (Incumbent)	5,188	51.6%
Republican	Diane Pagano	4,680	46.5%
Independent Party	Diane Pagano	193	1.9%
Total	Diane Pagano	4,873	48.4%
Total votes		10,061	100%
Democratic hold			

=== District 104 ===
2018 Connecticut State House of Representatives election, District 104
Party	Candidate	Votes	%
Democratic	Kara Rochelle	3,785	52.1%
Working Families	Kara Rochelle	345	4.8%
Total	Kara Rochelle	4,130	56.9%
Republican	Joseph Jaumann	3,002	41.4%
Independent Party	Joseph Jaumann	121	1.7%
Total	Joseph Jaumann	3,123	43.1%
Total votes		7,253	100%
Democratic hold			

=== District 105 ===
2018 Connecticut State House of Representatives election, District 105
Party	Candidate	Votes	%
Republican	Nicole Klarides-Ditria	6,697	64.5%
Independent Party	Nicole Klarides-Ditria	338	3.3%
Total	Nicole Klarides-Ditria (Incumbent)	7,035	67.8%
Democratic	Kevin McDuffie	3,346	32.2%
Total votes		10,381	100%
Republican hold			

=== District 106 ===
2018 Connecticut State House of Representatives election, District 106
Party	Candidate	Votes	%
Republican	Mitch Bolinsky (Incumbent)	5,697	50.5%
Democratic	Rebekah Harriman-Stites	5,297	47%
Working Families	Rebekah Harriman-Stites	278	2.5%
Total	Rebekah Harriman-Stites	5,575	49.5%
Total votes		11,272	100%
Republican hold			

=== District 107 ===
2018 Connecticut State House of Representatives election, District 107
Party	Candidate	Votes	%
Republican	Stephen Harding	6,556	56.4%
Independent Party	Stephen Harding	334	2.9%
Total	Stephen Harding (Incumbent)	6,890	59.3%
Democratic	Daniel Pearson	4,736	40.7%
Total votes		11,626	100%
Republican hold			

=== District 108 ===
2018 Connecticut State House of Representatives election, District 108
Party	Candidate	Votes	%
Republican	Richard Smith (Incumbent)	6,383	100%
Total votes		6,383	100.00%
Republican hold			

=== District 109 ===
2018 Connecticut State House of Representatives election, District 109
Party	Candidate	Votes	%
Democratic	David Arconti	3,555	59.5%
Working Families	David Arconti	252	4.3%
Total	David Arconti (Incumbent)	3,807	63.8%
Republican	Veasna Roeun	2,066	34.6%
Independent Party	Veasna Roeun	98	1.6%
Total	Veasna Roeun	2,164	36.2%
Total votes		5,971	100%
Democratic hold			

=== District 110 ===
2018 Connecticut State House of Representatives election, District 110
Party	Candidate	Votes	%
Democratic	Bob Godfrey	2,367	69%
Working Families	Bob Godfrey	130	3.8%
Total	Bob Godfrey (Incumbent)	2,497	72.8%
Republican	Erin Domenech	880	25.7%
Independent Party	Erin Domenech	53	1.5%
Total	Erin Domenech	933	36.2%
Total votes		3,430	100%
Democratic hold			

=== District 111 ===
2018 Connecticut State House of Representatives election, District 111
Party	Candidate	Votes	%
Republican	John Frey	6,048	49.5%
Independent Party	John Frey	278	2.3%
Total	John Frey (Incumbent)	6,326	51.8%
Democratic	Aimee Berger-Girvalo	5,888	48.2%
Total votes		12,214	100%
Republican hold			

=== District 112 ===
2018 Connecticut State House of Representatives election, District 112
Party	Candidate	Votes	%
Republican	J. P. Sredzinski	6,932	86.7%
Independent Party	J. P. Sredzinski	1,061	13.3%
Total	J. P. Sredzinski (Incumbent)	7,993	100%
Total votes		7,993	100%
Republican hold			

=== District 113 ===
2018 Connecticut State House of Representatives election, District 113
Party	Candidate	Votes	%
Republican	Jason Perillo (Incumbent)	6,233	65.1%
Democratic	Elaine Matto	3,347	34.9%
Total votes		9,580	100.00%
Republican hold			

=== District 114 ===
2018 Connecticut State House of Representatives election, District 114
Party	Candidate	Votes	%
Republican	Themis Klarides	6,022	52.4%
Independent Party	Themis Klarides	227	2%
Total	Themis Klarides (Incumbent)	6,249	54.4%
Democratic	Mary Welander	5,033	43.7%
Working Families	Mary Welander	213	1.9%
Total	Mary Welander	5,246	45.6%
Total votes		11,495	100%
Republican hold			

=== District 115 ===
2018 Connecticut State House of Representatives election, District 115
Party	Candidate	Votes	%
Democratic	Dorinda Borer	4,814	67.2%
Working Families	Dorinda Borer	326	4.6%
Total	Dorinda Borer	5,140	71.8%
Republican	Lynne Schlosser	2,016	28.2%
Total votes		7,156	100%
Democratic hold			

=== District 116 ===
2018 Connecticut State House of Representatives election, District 116
Party	Candidate	Votes	%
Democratic	Michael DiMassa	3,643	71.6%
Working Families	Michael DiMassa	146	2.9%
Total	Michael DiMassa (incumbent)	3,789	74.5%
Republican	Richard DePalma	1,299	25.5%
Total votes		5,088	100%
Democratic hold			

=== District 117 ===
2018 Connecticut State House of Representatives election, District 117
Party	Candidate	Votes	%
Republican	Charles Ferraro	5,823	53.4%
Independent Party	Charles Ferraro	204	1.9%
Total	Charles Ferraro (Incumbent)	6,027	55.3%
Democratic	Cindy Wolfe Boynton	4,626	42.5%
Working Families	Cindy Wolfe Boynton	241	2.2%
Total	Cindy Wolfe Boynton	4,867	44.7%
Total votes		10,894	100%
Republican hold			

=== District 118 ===
2018 Connecticut State House of Representatives election, District 118
Party	Candidate	Votes	%
Democratic	Kim Rose	5,404	53.4%
Independent Party	Kim Rose	292	2.9%
Total	Kim Rose (Incumbent)	5,696	56.3%
Republican	Connie Jagodzinski	4,421	43.7%
Total votes		10,117	100%
Democratic hold			

=== District 119 ===
2018 Connecticut State House of Representatives election, District 119
Party	Candidate	Votes	%
Republican	Kathy Kennedy	6,063	53.5%
Democratic	Ellen Beatty	5,044	44.5%
Working Families	Ellen Beatty	224	2%
Total	Ellen Beatty	5,268	46.5%
Total votes		11,331	100%
Republican hold			

=== District 120 ===
2018 Connecticut State House of Representatives election, District 120
Party	Candidate	Votes	%
Democratic	Phil Young (Incumbent)	5,222	49.8%
Republican	Jim Feehan	5,028	47.8%
Independent Party	Jim Feehan	181	1.7%
Total	Jim Feehan	5,208	49.7%
Petitioning	Prez Palmer	55	0.5%
Total votes		10,486	100%
Democratic gain from Republican			

=== District 121 ===
2018 Connecticut State House of Representatives election, District 121
Party	Candidate	Votes	%
Democratic	Joseph Gresko (Incumbent)	5,376	70.3%
Republican	Robert Mitchell	2,164	28.3%
Independent Party	Robert Mitchell	110	1.4%
Total	Robert Mitchell	2,274	29.7%
Total votes		7,650	100%
Democratic hold			

=== District 122 ===
2018 Connecticut State House of Representatives election, District 122
Party	Candidate	Votes	%
Republican	Ben McGorty (Incumbent)	7,006	61.3%
Democratic	Jose F. Goncalves	4,430	38.7%
Total votes		11,436	100.00%
Republican hold			

=== District 123 ===
2018 Connecticut State House of Representatives election, District 123
Party	Candidate	Votes	%
Republican	David Rutigliano	5,705	52%
Independent Party	David Rutigliano	210	1.9%
Total	David Rutigliano (Incumbent)	5,915	53.9%
Democratic	Sujata Gadkar-Wilcox	4,868	44.3%
Working Families	Sujata Gadkar-Wilcox	194	1.8%
Total	Sujata Gadkar-Wilcox	5,062	46.1%
Total votes		10,977	100%
Republican hold			

=== District 124 ===
2018 Connecticut State House of Representatives election, District 124
Party	Candidate	Votes	%
Democratic	Andre Baker (Incumbent)	3,971	89.7%
Republican	Jose Quiroga	458	10.3%
Total votes		4,429	100.00%
Democratic hold			

=== District 125 ===
2018 Connecticut State House of Representatives election, District 125
Party	Candidate	Votes	%
Republican	Tom O'Dea (Incumbent)	6,522	56.8%
Democratic	Ross Tartell	4,959	43.2%
Total votes		11,481	100.00%
Republican hold			

=== District 126 ===
2018 Connecticut State House of Representatives election, District 126
Party	Candidate	Votes	%
Democratic	Charlie Stallworth (Incumbent)	5,362	84.3%
Republican	Manuel Bataguas	997	15.7%
Total votes		6,359	100.00%
Democratic hold			

=== District 127 ===
2018 Connecticut State House of Representatives election, District 127
Party	Candidate	Votes	%
Democratic	Jack Hennessy	3,965	73.1%
Working Families	Jack Hennessy	116	2.1%
Total	Jack Hennessy (incumbent)	4,081	75.3%
Republican	Peter Perillo	1,341	24.7%
Total votes		5,422	100%
Democratic hold			

=== District 128 ===
2018 Connecticut State House of Representatives election, District 128
Party	Candidate	Votes	%
Democratic	Christopher Rosario (Incumbent)	2,366	88.2%
Republican	Ethan Book	317	11.8%
Total votes		2,683	100.00%
Democratic hold			

=== District 129 ===
2018 Connecticut State House of Representatives election, District 129
Party	Candidate	Votes	%
Democratic	Steven Stafstrom (Incumbent)	4,507	82.2%
Republican	Vallorie Clark	976	17.8%
Total votes		5,483	100.00%
Democratic hold			

=== District 130 ===
2018 Connecticut State House of Representatives election, District 130
Party	Candidate	Votes	%
Democratic	Ezequiel Santiago (Incumbent)	3,202	89.8%
Republican	Terry Sullivan	362	10.2%
Total votes		3,564	100.00%
Democratic hold			

=== District 131 ===
2018 Connecticut State House of Representatives election, District 131
Party	Candidate	Votes	%
Republican	David Labriola (Incumbent)	7,048	67.6%
Democratic	James Kiochko	3,371	32.4%
Total votes		10,419	100.00%
Republican hold			

=== District 132 ===
2018 Connecticut State House of Representatives election, District 132
Party	Candidate	Votes	%
Republican	Brenda Kupchick	6,186	51.7%
Independent Party	Brenda Kupchick	347	2.9%
Total	Brenda Kupchick (Incumbent)	6,533	54.6%
Democratic	Caitlin Clarkson Pereira	5,432	45.4%
Total votes		11,965	100%
Republican hold			

=== District 133 ===
2018 Connecticut State House of Representatives election, District 133
Party	Candidate	Votes	%
Democratic	Cristin McCarthy Vahey	5,845	61.3%
Working Families	Cristin McCarthy Vahey	236	2.5%
Total	Cristin McCarthy Vahey (Incumbent)	6,081	63.8%
Republican	Sally Connolly	3,241	34%
Independent Party	Sally Connolly	203	2.1%
Total	Sally Connolly	3,444	36.2%
Total votes		9,525	100%
Democratic hold			

=== District 134 ===
2018 Connecticut State House of Representatives election, District 134
Party	Candidate	Votes	%
Republican	Laura Devlin	5,516	50.2%
Independent Party	Laura Devlin	213	2%
Total	Laura Devlin (Incumbent)	5,729	52.2%
Democratic	Ashley Guadiano	5,251	47.8%
Total votes		10,980	100%
Republican hold			

=== District 135 ===
2018 Connecticut State House of Representatives election, District 135
Party	Candidate	Votes	%
Democratic	Anne Hughes	6,449	52.8%
Working Families	Anne Hughes	118	1%
Total	Anne Hughes	6,567	53.8%
Republican	Adam Dunsby	5,393	44.2%
Independent Party	Adam Dunsby	183	1.5%
Total	Adam Dunsby (Incumbent)	5,576	45.7%
Green	Michael Pitassi	66	0.5%
Total votes		12,209	100%
Democratic gain from Republican			

=== District 136 ===
2018 Connecticut State House of Representatives election, District 136
Party	Candidate	Votes	%
Democratic	Jonathan Steinberg (Incumbent)	7,945	61.3%
Republican	Greg Kraut	4,704	36.3%
Independent Party	Greg Kraut	304	2.3%
Total	Greg Kraut	5,008	38.7%
Total votes		12,953	100%
Democratic hold			

=== District 137 ===
2018 Connecticut State House of Representatives election, District 137
Party	Candidate	Votes	%
Democratic	Chris Perone	6,076	66.6%
Working Families	Chris Perone	247	2.7%
Total	Chris Perone (Incumbent)	6,323	69.3%
Republican	Frank Page	2,662	29.2%
Independent Party	Frank Page	138	1.5%
Total	Frank Page	2,800	30.7%
Total votes		9,123	100%
Democratic hold			

=== District 138 ===
2018 Connecticut State House of Representatives election, District 138
Party	Candidate	Votes	%
Democratic	Kenneth Gucker	4,658	49.2%
Working Families	Kenneth Gucker	168	1.8%
Total	Kenneth Gucker	4,826	51%
Republican	Michael Ferguson	4,395	46.5%
Independent Party	Michael Ferguson	240	2.5%
Total	Michael Ferguson (Incumbent)	4,635	49%
Total votes		9,461	100%
Democratic gain from Republican			

=== District 139 ===
2018 Connecticut State House of Representatives election, District 139
Party	Candidate	Votes	%
Democratic	Kevin Ryan	3,925	49.6%
Working Families	Kevin Ryan	284	3.6%
Total	Kevin Ryan (Incumbent)	4,209	53.2%
Republican	Nick DeLucia	3,467	43.8%
Independent Party	Nick DeLucia	235	3%
Total	Nick DeLucia	3,702	46.8%
Total votes		7,911	100%
Democratic hold			

=== District 140 ===
2018 Connecticut State House of Representatives election, District 140
Party	Candidate	Votes	%
Democratic	Travis Simms	3,844	70%
Republican	John Flynn	974	17.7%
Independent Party	John Flynn	98	1.8%
Total	John Flynn	1,072	19.5%
Working Families	Colin Anthony Hosten	579	10.5%
Total votes		5,495	100%
Democratic hold			

=== District 141 ===
2018 Connecticut State House of Representatives election, District 141
Party	Candidate	Votes	%
Republican	Terrie Wood	7,237	86.9%
Independent Party	Terrie Wood	1,095	13.1%
Total	Terrie Wood (Incumbent)	8,332	100%
Total votes		8,332	100%
Republican hold			

=== District 142 ===
2018 Connecticut State House of Representatives election, District 142
Party	Candidate	Votes	%
Democratic	Lucy Dathan	5,790	52.7%
Working Families	Lucy Dathan	203	1.8%
Total	Lucy Dathan	5,993	54.5%
Republican	Fred Wilms	4,797	43.7%
Independent Party	Fred Wilms	199	1.8%
Total	Fred Wilms (Incumbent)	4,996	45.5%
Total votes		10,989	100%
Democratic gain from Republican			

=== District 143 ===
2018 Connecticut State House of Representatives election, District 143
Party	Candidate	Votes	%
Republican	Gail Lavielle	5,833	49.3%
Independent Party	Gail Lavielle	261	2.2%
Total	Gail Lavielle (Incumbent)	6,094	51.5%
Democratic	Stephanie Thomas	5,586	47.3%
Working Families	Stephanie Thomas	147	1.2%
Total	Stephanie Thomas	5,733	48.5%
Total votes		11,827	100%
Republican hold			

=== District 144 ===
2018 Connecticut State House of Representatives election, District 144
Party	Candidate	Votes	%
Democratic	Caroline Simmons (Incumbent)	7,242	100%
Total votes		7,242	100%
Democratic hold			

=== District 145 ===
2018 Connecticut State House of Representatives election, District 145
Party	Candidate	Votes	%
Democratic	Patricia Billie Miller (Incumbent)	4,580	82.6%
Republican	Fritz Blau	965	17.4%
Total votes		5,545	100.00%
Democratic hold			

=== District 146 ===
2018 Connecticut State House of Representatives election, District 146
Party	Candidate	Votes	%
Democratic	David Michel	5,913	72.4%
Republican	Dan Pannone	2,257	27.6%
Total votes		8,170	100.00%
Democratic hold			

=== District 147 ===
2018 Connecticut State House of Representatives election, District 147
Party	Candidate	Votes	%
Democratic	Matt Blumenthal	6,187	58.9%
Republican	Anzelmo Graziosi	4,153	39.5%
Independent Party	Anzelmo Graziosi	173	1.6%
Total	Anzelmo Graziosi	4,326	41.1%
Total votes		10,513	100%
Democratic hold			

=== District 148 ===
2018 Connecticut State House of Representatives election, District 148
Party	Candidate	Votes	%
Democratic	Daniel Fox (Incumbent)	5,013	75.8%
Republican	Phillip Balestriere	1,604	24.2%
Total votes		6,617	100.00%
Democratic hold			

=== District 149 ===
2018 Connecticut State House of Representatives election, District 149
Party	Candidate	Votes	%
Republican	Livvy Floren (Incumbent)	6,971	100%
Total votes		6,971	100.00%
Republican hold			

=== District 150 ===
2018 Connecticut State House of Representatives election, District 150
Party	Candidate	Votes	%
Democratic	Steve Meskers	4,859	52.1%
Republican	Mike Bocchino	4,272	45.8%
Independent Party	Mike Bocchino	192	2.1%
Total	Mike Bocchino (Incumbent)	4,464	47.9%
Total votes		9,323	100%
Democratic hold			

=== District 151 ===
2018 Connecticut State House of Representatives election, District 151
Party	Candidate	Votes	%
Republican	Fred Camillo	5,918	54.1%
Independent Party	Fred Camillo	227	2.1%
Total	Fred Camillo (Incumbent)	6,145	56.2%
Democratic	Laura Kostin	4,786	43.8%
Total votes		10,931	100%
Republican hold			
