= 2026 United States House of Representatives elections in Connecticut =

2026 United House of Representatives elections in Connecticut
- November 3, 2026

All 5 Connecticut seats to the United States House of Representatives
	Majority party	Minority party
Party	Democratic	Republican
Last election	5	0
Seats won	5	0
Seat change	Steady	Steady
Popular vote	807,959	460,679
Percentage	62.84%	35.83%
Swing	▲3.99%	▼4.60%

Democratic
40–50%
50–60%
60–70%
70–80%
80–90%
Republican
50–60%
60–70%

The 2026 United States House of Representatives elections in Connecticut were held on November 3, 2026, to elect the five U.S. representatives from the state of Connecticut, one from each of the state's congressional districts. The elections coincided with other elections to the House of Representatives, elections to the United States Senate, and various state and local elections. The primary elections took place on August 11, 2026.

== District 1 ==
2026 Connecticut's 1st congressional district election
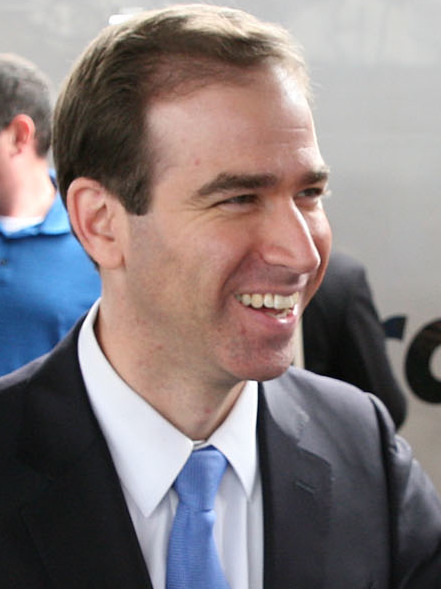

Nominee	Luke Bronin	Amy Chai
Party	Democratic	Republican
Popular vote	170,479	78,461
Percentage	67.28%	30.96%
- Municipality results Bronin: 40–50% 50–60% 60–70% 70–80% 80–90% Chai: 40–50% 50–60% 60–70%
U.S. Representative before election
John Larson
Democratic
Elected U.S. Representative
Luke Bronin
Democratic

The 1st district is located in the north-central part of the state and includes the capital city, Hartford. The incumbent is Democrat John Larson, who was re-elected with 63.1% of the vote in 2024.

Larson faced criticism due to his age; he would turn 80 during the next term. He faced several challengers in the Democratic primary, but repeatedly said he would run for re-election. The state Democratic party endorsed his most prominent opponent, former Hartford mayor Luke Bronin, who ultimately defeated Larson in a landslide. Other candidates in the primary included Ruth Fortune, a member of the Hartford Board of Education, and Jillian Gilchrest, a state representative.

Bronin faced Republican Amy Chai in the general election, and won.

=== Democratic primary ===
==== Candidates ====
===== Nominee =====
- Luke Bronin, former mayor of Hartford (2016–2024)

===== Eliminated in primary =====
- Ruth Fortune, member of the Hartford Board of Education
- Jillian Gilchrest, state representative from the 18th district (2019–present)
- John Larson, incumbent U.S. representative

===== Withdrawn =====
- Jack Perry, Southington town councilor

==== Endorsements ====
Luke Bronin

Executive branch officials

- Pete Buttigieg, former secretary of transportation (2021–2025)

State legislators

- Julio Concepcion, HD-04 (2018–present)
- Joshua M. Hall, HD-07 (2017–present)
- James Sánchez, HD-06 (2023–present)

Local officials

- Arunan Arulampalam, mayor of Hartford (2024–present)

Organizations

- College Democrats of Connecticut
- VoteVets

Labor unions

- American Federation of State, County and Municipal Employees Local 1716
- Uniformed Professional Firefighters Association of Connecticut
- United Brotherhood of Carpenters and Joiners of America Local 326

Political parties

- Democratic Party of Connecticut
Ruth Fortune

Organizations

- New American Leaders Action Fund
John Larson

U.S. senators

- Richard Blumenthal, Connecticut (2011–present)
- Chris Dodd, former Connecticut (1981–2011)
- Chris Murphy, Connecticut (2013–present)

U.S. representatives

- Jim Clyburn, SC-06 (1993–present)
- Joe Courtney, CT-02 (2007–present)
- Rosa DeLauro, CT-03 (1991–present)
- Jahana Hayes, CT-05 (2019–present)
- Jim Himes, CT-04 (2009–present)
- Hakeem Jeffries, House minority leader (2023–present) from NY-08 (2013–present)
- Barbara B. Kennelly, former CT-01 (1982–1999)
- Jamie Raskin, MD-08 (2017–present)

Statewide officials

- William Tong, attorney general of Connecticut (2019–present)

State legislators

- Saud Anwar, SD-03 (2019–present)
- Patrick Biggins, HD-11 (2025–present)
- Jason Doucette, HD-13 (2019–present)
- Mary Fortier, HD-79 (2023–present)
- Henry Genga, HD-10 (2006–present)
- Matt Lesser, SD-09 (2019–present)
- Geoff Luxenberg, HD-12 (2011–2015, 2019–present)
- MD Rahman, SD-04 (2023–present)
- Jason Rojas, House majority leader (2021–present) from HD-09 (2009–present)
- Gary Turco, HD-27 (2019–present)

Labor unions

- American Federation of Government Employees Locals 2138, 1674 & 1164
- Connecticut Building Trades Council
- Connecticut State Council of Machinists
- Greater Hartford Building Trades
- International Association of Machinists
- International Association of Sheet Metal, Air, Rail and Transportation Workers
- Laborers' International Union of North America
- Machinists District 26
- National Association of Government Employees Local R1-109
- Sheet Metal Workers Local 40

Organizations

- AIPAC
- Alliance for Retired Americans
- J Street PAC
- League of Conservation Voters
- Planned Parenthood Action Fund

Political parties

- Working Families Party
Jillian Gilchrest

State officials

- Beth Bye, commissioner of the Connecticut Office of Early Childhood (2019–present) and former SD-05 (2011–2019)

State legislators

- Amy Morrin Bello, HD-28 (2020–present)
- Kai Belton, HD-100 (2023–present)
- Aimee Berger-Girvalo, HD-111 (2021–present)
- Robin Comey, HD-102 (2019–present)
- Lucy Dathan, HD-142 (2019–present)
- Eleni Kavros DeGraw, HD-17 (2021–present)
- Kate Farrar, HD-20 (2021–present)
- Jaime Foster, HD-57 (2021–present)
- Sujata Gadkar-Wilcox, SD-22 (2025–present)
- Nick Gauthier, HD-38 (2025–present)
- Anne Meiman Hughes, HD-135 (2019–present)
- Sarah Keitt, HD-134 (2023–present)
- Jennifer Leeper, HD-132 (2021–present)
- Ceci Maher, SD-26 (2023–present)
- Rebecca Martinez, HD-22 (2025–present)
- Martha Marx, SD-20 (2023–present)
- Nick Menapace, HD-37 (2025–present)
- Kaitlyn Shake, HD-120 (2025–present)
- Laurie Sweet, HD-91 (2025–present)
- Mary Welander, HD-114 (2021–present)

Organizations

- Indivisible Connecticut
- National Association of Social Workers
- Progressive Victory
- Track AIPAC
Jack Perry (withdrawn)

Organizations

- Track AIPAC

==== Fundraising ====
Italics indicate a withdrawn candidate.

Campaign finance reports as of July 22, 2026
Candidate	Raised	Spent	Cash on hand
Luke Bronin (D)	$3,070,150	$2,469,256	$600,894
Ruth Fortune (D)	$106,849	$85,466	$21,382
Jillian Gilchrest (D)	$163,908	$129,364	$34,543
John Larson (D)	$2,733,259	$2,172,086	$809,902
Jack Perry (D)	$532,427	$532,427	$0
Source: Federal Election Commission

==== Polling ====
Poll source	Date(s) administered	Sample size (Note: Key: A – all adults RV – registered voters LV – likely voters V – unclear)	Margin of error	Luke Bronin	Ruth Fortune	Jillian Gilchrest	John Larson	Undecided
Global Strategy Group (D) (Note: Poll sponsored by VoteVets, which supports Bronin)	May 18–21, 2026	500 (LV)	± 4.4%	38%	4%	10%	30%	18%
GQR (D) (Note: Poll sponsored by Larson's campaign)	January 27 – February 1, 2026	400 (LV)	± 4.9%	26%	–	9%	49%	15%

==== Results ====
Results by municipality: Bronin: 40–50%; 50–60%; 60–70%; Larson: 40–50%; 50–60%

Results by precinct: Bronin: 30–40%; 40–50%; 50–60%; 60–70%; Larson: 40–50%; 50–60%

Democratic primary results
Party	Candidate	Votes	%
Democratic	Luke Bronin	29,219	53.64
Democratic	John Larson (incumbent)	18,221	33.45
Democratic	Jillian Gilchrest	4,468	8.20
Democratic	Ruth Fortune	2,568	4.71
Total votes		54,476	100.00

=== Republican primary ===
==== Candidates ====
===== Nominee =====
- Amy Chai, doctor and Independent Party candidate for Connecticut's 3rd congressional district in 2022

===== Filed paperwork =====
- Gavin Solomon, businessman

==== Endorsements ====
Amy Chai

Organizations

- Veterans for America First

Political parties

- Connecticut Republican Party

==== Fundraising ====
Campaign finance reports as of June 30, 2026
Candidate	Raised	Spent	Cash on hand
Amy Chai (R)	$20,827	$16,227	344
Source: Federal Election Commission

=== Independents ===
==== Candidates ====
===== Filed paperwork =====
- Mark Stewart Greenstein, businessman, attorney, and perennial candidate

=== General election ===
==== Predictions ====
Source	Ranking	As of
Decision Desk HQ	Safe D	July 14, 2026
The Cook Political Report	Solid D	June 13, 2025
Inside Elections	Solid D	June 13, 2025
Sabato's Crystal Ball	Safe D	June 13, 2025
The Economist	Safe D	May 6, 2026

==== Post-primary endorsements ====
Luke Bronin (D)

U.S. representatives

- Greg Stanton, AZ-04 (2019–present)

Organizations

- J Street
- NewDem Action Fund

==== Results ====
2026 Connecticut's 1st congressional district election
Party	Candidate	Votes	%
Democratic	Luke Bronin	170,479	67.28
Republican	Amy Chai	78,461	30.96
Green	Mary L. Sanders	4,435	1.75
Write-in	Mark Stewart Greenstein	17	0.01
Total votes		253,392	100.00
Democratic hold			

== District 2 ==
2026 Connecticut's 2nd congressional district election
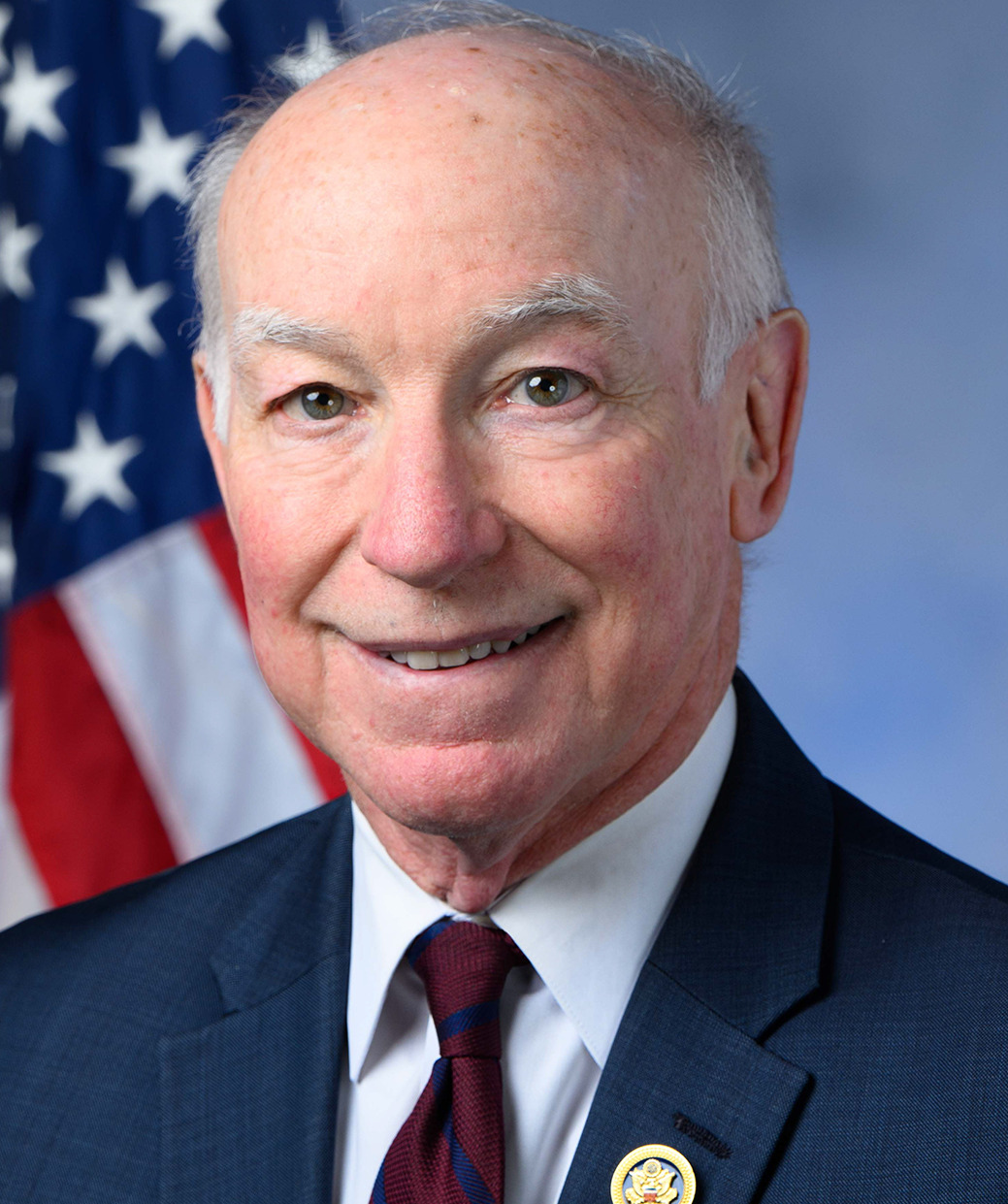

Nominee	Joe Courtney	George Austin
Party	Democratic	Republican
Alliance		Independent
Popular vote	182,381	109,653
Percentage	62.45%	37.55%
- Municipality results Courtney: 50–60% 60–70% 70–80% 80–90% Austin: 50–60%
U.S. Representative before election
Joe Courtney
Democratic
Elected U.S. Representative
Joe Courtney
Democratic

The 2nd district is located in the eastern part of the state and includes New London and Groton. The incumbent is Democrat Joe Courtney, who was re-elected with 57.1% of the vote in 2024.

=== Democratic primary ===
==== Candidates ====
===== Nominee =====
- Joe Courtney, incumbent U.S. representative

===== Withdrawn =====
- Kyle Gauck, supply chain manager

==== Endorsements ====
Kyle Gauck (withdrawn)

Organizations

- Progressive Victory
Joe Courtney

Labor unions

- National Education Association

Organizations

- J Street PAC
- Jewish Democratic Council of America
- Planned Parenthood Action Fund

Political parties

- Democratic Party of Connecticut

==== Fundraising ====
Campaign finance reports as of June 30, 2026
Candidate	Raised	Spent	Cash on hand
Joe Courtney (D)	$760,424	$508,302	$603,233
Kyle Gauck (D)	$22,593	$21,011	$27
Source: Federal Election Commission

=== Republican primary ===
==== Candidates ====
===== Nominee =====
- George Austin, business owner

===== Withdrawn =====
- Mike France, former state representative from the 42nd district (2015–2023) and nominee for this district in 2022 and 2024 (Running for State Senate)

==== Endorsements ====
George Austin

Political parties

- Connecticut Republican Party

==== Fundraising ====
Italics indicate a withdrawn candidate.

Campaign finance reports as of June 30, 2026
Candidate	Raised	Spent	Cash on hand
George Austin (R)	$283,997	$84,046	$199,950
Mike France (R)	$70,790	$70,790	$0
Source: Federal Election Commission

=== Independents ===
==== Candidates ====
===== Filed paperwork =====
- Kyle Gauck, supply chain manager (previously ran in the Democratic primary)

=== General election ===
==== Predictions ====
Source	Ranking	As of
Decision Desk HQ	Safe D	July 14, 2026
The Cook Political Report	Solid D	June 13, 2025
Inside Elections	Solid D	June 13, 2025
Sabato's Crystal Ball	Safe D	June 13, 2025
The Economist	Safe D	May 6, 2026

==== Polling ====
Poll source	Date(s) administered	Sample size	Margin of error	Joe Courtney (D)	George Austin (R)	Other	Undecided
DM Strategies	October 16–19, 2026	279 (LV)	± 5.9%	52%	33%	1% (Note: "No answer" with 1%)	13%

==== Results ====
2026 Connecticut's 2nd congressional district election
Party	Candidate	Votes	%
Democratic	Joe Courtney (incumbent)	182,381	62.45
Republican	George Austin	103,585	35.47
Independent Party	George Austin	6,068	2.08
Total	George Austin	109,653	37.55
Write-in	Kyle Gauck	30	0.01
Total votes		292,064	100.00
Democratic hold			

== District 3 ==
2026 Connecticut's 3rd congressional district election
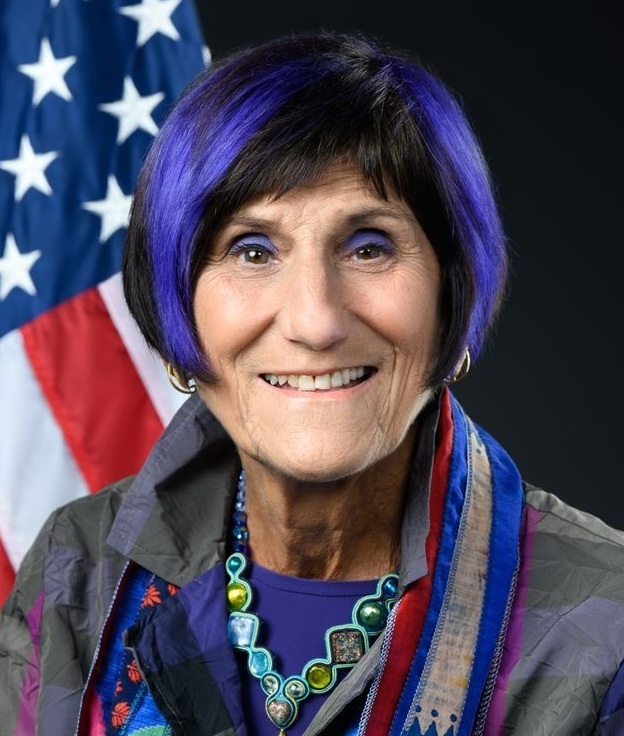

Nominee	Rosa DeLauro	Christopher Lancia
Party	Democratic	Republican
Popular vote	151,261	87,885
Percentage	61.21%	35.56%
- Municipality results DeLauro: 40–50% 50–60% 60–70% 70–80% 80–90% Lancia: 50–60%
U.S. Representative before election
Rosa DeLauro
Democratic
Elected U.S. Representative
Rosa DeLauro
Democratic

The 3rd district is located in the south-central part of the state and includes New Haven. The incumbent is Democrat Rosa DeLauro, who was re-elected with 58.9% of the vote in 2024.

=== Democratic primary ===
==== Candidates ====
===== Nominee =====
- Rosa DeLauro, incumbent U.S. representative

===== Eliminated at convention =====
- Andrew Rice, molecular biologist and DSA member (running as an independent)

===== Withdrawn =====
- Damjan DeNoble, attorney

==== Endorsements ====
Rosa DeLauro

U.S. representatives

- Gabby Giffords, former AZ-08 (2007–2012)

Labor unions

- National Education Association

Organizations

- ~~AIPAC~~ (states on website "Congresswoman DeLauro has stated she is no longer taking money from AIPAC)"
- J Street PAC
- Planned Parenthood Action Fund
- Population Connection Action Fund
- Reproductive Freedom for All

Political parties

- Democratic Party of Connecticut
Andrew Rice

Organizations

- Track AIPAC

==== Fundraising ====
Italics indicate a withdrawn candidate.

Campaign finance reports as of June 30, 2026
Candidate	Raised	Spent	Cash on hand
Rosa DeLauro (D)	$1,152,006	$1,028,036	$349,418
Damjan DeNoble (D)	$11,468	$4,245	$55
Andrew Rice (D)	$29,133	$119,151	$9,981
Source: Federal Election Commission

=== Republican primary ===
==== Candidates ====
===== Nominee =====
- Christopher Lancia, law enforcement professional

===== Eliminated at convention =====
- Rafael Irizarry, nominee for Connecticut's 121st House of Representatives district in 2024

==== Endorsements ====
Christopher Lancia

Political parties

- Connecticut Republican Party

==== Fundraising ====
Campaign finance reports as of June 30, 2026
Candidate	Raised	Spent	Cash on hand
Christopher Lancia (R)	$14,649	$4,446	$4,028
Source: Federal Election Commission

=== Independents ===
==== Candidates ====
===== Declared =====
- Thomas Egan, attorney

===== Filed Paperwork =====
- Andrew Rice, biologist and democratic socialist activist (previously ran in the Democratic primary)

=== General election ===
==== Predictions ====
Source	Ranking	As of
Decision Desk HQ	Safe D	July 14, 2026
The Cook Political Report	Solid D	June 13, 2025
Inside Elections	Solid D	June 13, 2025
Sabato's Crystal Ball	Safe D	June 13, 2025
The Economist	Safe D	May 6, 2026

==== Post-primary endorsements ====
Rosa DeLauro (D)

Organizations

- National Women's Political Caucus

==== Results ====
2026 Connecticut's 3rd congressional district election
Party	Candidate	Votes	%
Democratic	Rosa DeLauro (incumbent)	151,261	61.21
Republican	Christopher Lancia	87,885	35.56
Independent Party	Thomas Egan	7,322	2.96
Write-in	Andrew Rice	663	0.27
Total votes		247,131	100.00
Democratic hold			

== District 4 ==
2026 Connecticut's 4th congressional district election
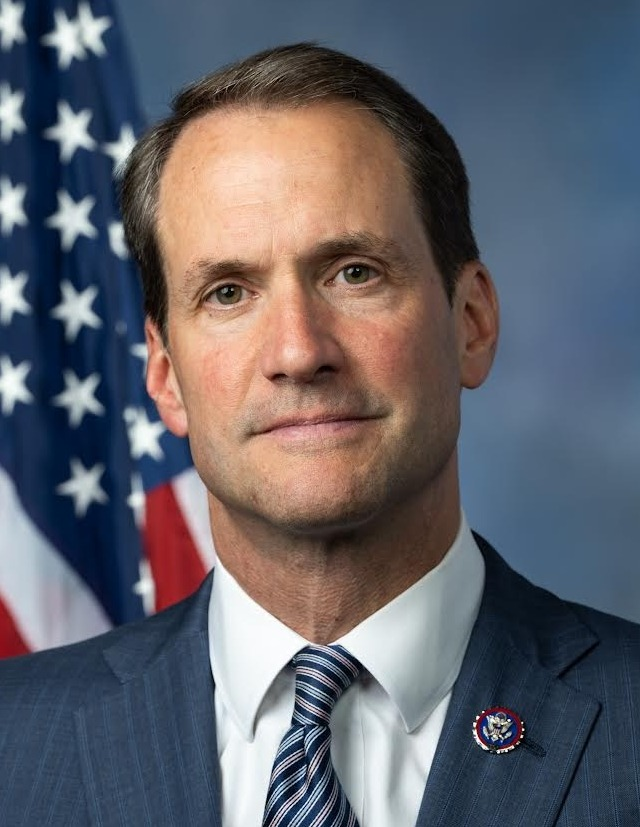

Nominee	Jim Himes	Michael Goldstein
Party	Democratic	Republican
Popular vote	157,485	78,059
Percentage	65.58%	32.51%
- Municipality results Himes: 50–60% 60–70% 70–80% 80–90% Goldstein: 50–60%
U.S. Representative before election
Jim Himes
Democratic
Elected U.S. Representative
Jim Himes
Democratic

The 4th district is located in the south western part of the state and includes Bridgeport, Greenwich, and Stamford. The incumbent is Democrat Jim Himes, who was re-elected with 61.1% of the vote in 2024.

=== Democratic primary ===
==== Candidates ====
===== Nominee =====
- Jim Himes, incumbent U.S. representative

===== Eliminated at convention =====
- Joseph Perez-Caputo, law student and community organizer (filed to run as an independent)

==== Endorsements ====
Jim Himes

Organizations

- Planned Parenthood Action Fund

Political parties

- Democratic Party of Connecticut

==== Fundraising ====
Campaign finance reports as of June 30, 2026
Candidate	Raised	Spent	Cash on hand
Jim Himes (D)	$1,379,560	$968,702	$2,517,676
Source: Federal Election Commission

=== Republican primary ===
==== Nominee ====
- Michael Goldstein, member of the Greenwich Representative Town Meeting from the 10th district (2023–present), nominee for this district in 2024, and candidate in 2020 and 2022

==== Eliminated in primary ====
- Daniel Miressi, hockey coach

==== Filed paperwork ====
- Luz Bueno

==== Endorsements ====
Michael Goldstein

Political parties

- Connecticut Republican Party

==== Fundraising ====
Campaign finance reports as of June 30, 2026
Candidate	Raised	Spent	Cash on hand
Michael Goldstein (R)	$46,809	$5,767	$41,041
Daniel Miressi (R)	$10,721	$10,491	$0
Source: Federal Election Commission

==== Results ====
Republican primary results
Party	Candidate	Votes	%
Republican	Michael Goldstein	4,632	74.3
Republican	Daniel Miressi	1,606	25.7
Total votes		6,238	100.0

=== Independent Party ===
==== Candidate ====
- Benjamin Wesley, mechanical engineer

=== Independents ===
==== Candidates ====
===== Filed paperwork =====
- Damon Lawrence Cerreta, cleaning service owner
- Joseph Perez-Caputo, law student and community organizer

=== General election ===
==== Predictions ====
Source	Ranking	As of
Decision Desk HQ	Safe D	July 14, 2026
The Cook Political Report	Solid D	May 29, 2025
Inside Elections	Solid D	June 13, 2025
Sabato's Crystal Ball	Safe D	June 13, 2025
The Economist	Safe D	May 6, 2026

==== Results ====
2026 Connecticut's 4th congressional district election
Party	Candidate	Votes	%
Democratic	Jim Himes (incumbent)	157,485	65.58
Republican	Michael Goldstein	78,059	32.51
Independent Party	Benjamin Wesley	4,594	1.91
Total votes		240,138	100.00
Democratic hold			

== District 5 ==
2026 Connecticut's 5th congressional district election
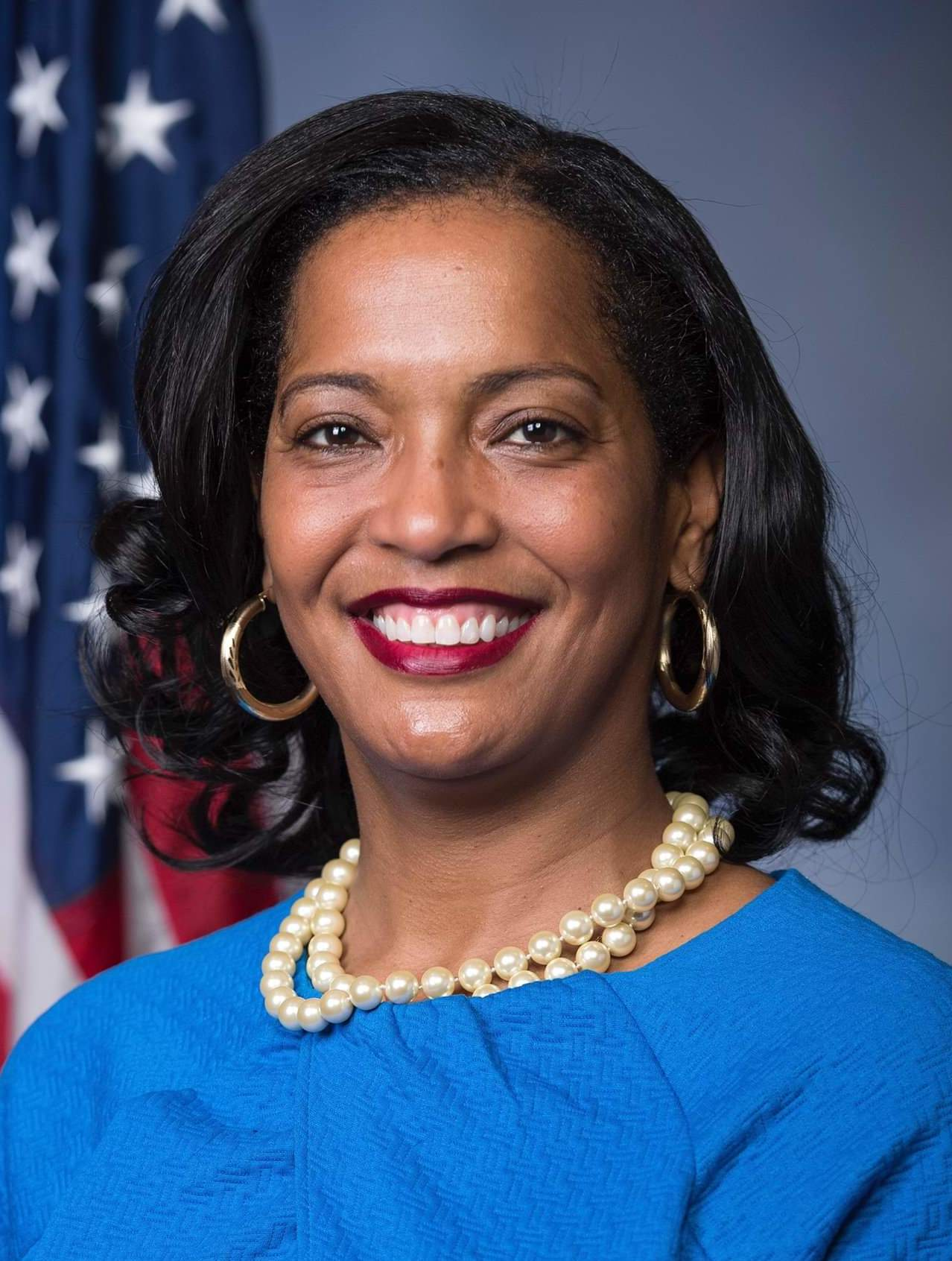

Nominee	Jahana Hayes	Chris Shea
Party	Democratic	Republican
Alliance	Working Families
Popular vote	146,353	106,667
Percentage	57.84%	42.15%
- Municipality results Hayes: 50–60% 60–70% 70–80% 80–90% Shea: 50–60% 60–70%
U.S. Representative before election
Jahana Hayes
Democratic
Elected U.S. Representative
Jahana Hayes
Democratic

The 5th district is located in the north western part of the state and includes Danbury and Waterbury. The incumbent is Democrat Jahana Hayes, who was re-elected with 53.4% of the vote in 2024.

=== Democratic primary ===
==== Candidates ====
===== Nominee =====
- Jahana Hayes, incumbent U.S. representative

===== Eliminated at convention =====
- Winter Solomita
- Jackson Taddeo-Waite, filmmaker (running as an independent)

==== Endorsements ====
Jahana Hayes

Labor unions

- National Education Association

Organizations

- Elect Democratic Women
- Emily's List
- Giffords
- J Street PAC
- Jewish Democratic Council of America
- Joint Action Committee for Political Affairs
- League of Conservation Voters
- National Women's Political Caucus
- Planned Parenthood Action Fund
- Reproductive Freedom for All

Political parties

- Democratic Party of Connecticut

==== Fundraising ====
Campaign finance reports as of June 30, 2026
Candidate	Raised	Spent	Cash on hand
Jahana Hayes (D)	$1,290,077	$728,471	$1,084,158
Source: Federal Election Commission

=== Republican primary ===
==== Nominee ====
- Chris Shea, firefighter

==== Eliminated in primary ====
- Jonathan De Barros, nonprofit founder

==== Eliminated at convention ====
- Michele Botelho, paralegal

==== Endorsements ====
Chris Shea

U.S. representatives

- Eli Crane, AZ-02 (2023–present)
- Rob Simmons, former CT-02 (2001–2007)
- Ryan Zinke, MT-01 (2015–2017, 2023–present)

State legislators

- Stephen Harding, minority leader of the Connecticut State Senate (2024–present) from SD-30 (2023–present)

Political parties

- Connecticut Republican Party

==== Fundraising ====
Campaign finance reports as of June 30, 2026
Candidate	Raised	Spent	Cash on hand
Michele Botelho (R)	$56,496	$51,015	$0
Jonathan De Barros (R) (Note: As last reported on March 31, 2026)	$24,699	$17,455	$7,034
Chris Shea (R)	$311,675	$166,058	$145,616
Source: Federal Election Commission

==== Results ====
Republican primary results
Party	Candidate	Votes	%
Republican	Chris Shea	10,261	81.0
Republican	Jonathan De Barros	2,411	19.0
Total votes		12,672	100.0

=== Independents ===
==== Candidates ====
===== Filed paperwork =====
- Jonathan De Barros, nonprofit founder (previously ran in the Republican primary)
- Jackson Taddeo-Waite, filmmaker (previously ran in the Democratic primary)

=== General election ===
==== Predictions ====
Source	Ranking	As of
Decision Desk HQ	Safe D	September 25, 2026
The Cook Political Report	Solid D	January 15, 2026
Inside Elections	Solid D	June 13, 2025
Sabato's Crystal Ball	Safe D	July 30, 2026
The Economist	Safe D	May 6, 2026

==== Post-primary endorsements ====
Jahana Hayes

Organizations

- Democrats for Education Reform

==== Polling ====
Poll source	Date(s) administered	Sample size	Margin of error	Jahana Hayes (D)	Chris Shea (R)	Undecided
OnMessage (R) (Note: Poll conducted for Shea's campaign)	September 29 – October 1, 2026	?	± 5.9%	51%	45%	4%

==== Results ====
2026 Connecticut's 5th congressional district election
Party	Candidate	Votes	%
Democratic	Jahana Hayes	139,012	54.92
Working Families	Jahana Hayes	7,353	2.91
Total	Jahana Hayes (incumbent)	146,365	57.84
Republican	Chris Shea	106,670	42.15
Write-in	Jonathan De Barros	62	0.02
Total votes		253,097	100.00
Democratic hold			

== See also ==
- 2026 Connecticut elections
- 2026 United States House of Representatives elections
- 2026 Connecticut House of Representatives election

== Notes ==
Partisan clients
