= Libertarian Party of Connecticut =

State affiliate of the Libertarian Party

- Chairperson: Steve Dincher
- Senate leader: None
- House leader: None
- Founded: 1971
- Ideology: Libertarianism
- National affiliation: Libertarian Party (United States)
- Colors: a shade of Blue; Yellow^{1}
- Connecticut Senate: 0 / 36
- Connecticut House of Representatives: 0 / 151
- U.S. Senate (Connecticut): 0 / 2
- U.S. House of Representatives (Connecticut): 0 / 5
- Other elected officials: 0 (June 2024)

Website
- www.lpct.org

The Libertarian Party of Connecticut is a statewide affiliate of the U.S. Libertarian Party. The Connecticut Libertarian Party has the basic aims of furthering individual freedom and opposing the initiation of force against individuals, among other things. It does this by engaging in political, educational, and social activities.

== History ==
The party leadership declined to endorse celebrity author Ann Coulter in a run for Congress in 2000, in a bid against Chris Shays for the 4th district. As a result, her congressional campaign did not take place.

In 2018 party members gathered at a yearly festival in a public park in Meriden to collect signatures for ballot access, and were ordered to leave by Mayor Kevin Scarpati. The party an its state chair Dan Reale proceeded to sue Scarpati, and settled out of court for a sum of $37,000.

== Sub-affiliates ==
- The Libertarian Party of New Haven County
- The Libertarian Party of Fairfield County
- The Libertarian Party of Hartford County

== Registration and Membership ==
To register as a member of the Libertarian Party with the Connecticut Secretary of the State, an eligible voter must write in "Libertarian" in Box 9 of the state voter registration form. As of November 5, 2018, it was the state's fourth largest party, trailing the Democratic, Republican, and Independent parties.

Year	Registered Voters
2019	3116
2018	2,980
2017	
2016	2,561
2015	
2014	1,780
2013	1,684
2012	1,603
2011	
2010	1,295
2009	1,278
2008	987
2007	1,042
2006	840
2005	1,033
2004	789
2003	643
2002	741
2001	704
2000	653
1999	
1998	149
1997	
1996	70
1995	
1994	
1993	
1992	29

Voters may also register with the state party itself as either an associate member or a full member. An associate member does not pay dues, may not be a member of the State Central Committee or the Judiciary Committee, and does not have voting privileges at party functions, such as its annual convention. A full member enjoys all membership privileges and must pay annual dues of $25. Both associate members and full members must sign the Libertarian pledge, which states "I hereby certify that I do not believe in or advocate the initiation of force to achieve political, social, or economic goals."

A voter may register with the state Libertarian Party as either a full or associate member while remaining a registered member of another party with the Secretary of the State.

== Elected Officials ==
Gordon Haave was the first Libertarian elected to public office in the state of Connecticut. He was elected in a non-partisan election as a Greenwich Representative Town Meeting member in November, 1995. There have been several people who affiliate with the Libertarian Party elected to local offices on other party ballot lines. Most recently, in November, 2013 Joshua Katz was elected on the Republican line to the Westbrook Planning Commission, and Sean Foley was elected on the Democratic line to the Burlington Board of Finance. There have also been several people affiliated with the Libertarian Party who have served in appointed office. Most recently, Robin Lasky was appointed in June 2016 to the Branford Solid Waste Management Commission, and Matthew Radant was appointed in November 2017 to the Plainfield Board of Education.

== 2018 Candidates ==
The following candidates were on the ballot:

US Senate: Richard Lion

US House 2: Daniel Reale

Governor: Rod Hanscomb

Lieutenant Governor: Jeffrey Thibeault

Comptroller: Paul Passarelli

Secretary of State: Heather Gwynn

Treasurer: Jesse Brohinsky

General Assembly 9: Anthony Armetta

General Assembly 65: Kent Johnson

General Assembly 83: Roger Misbach

General Assembly 91: Gary Walsh

== Election results ==
An asterisk in the percentage column indicates a multi-winner district, rather than a single winner district.

=== 2019 ===
Aaron Lewis was on the ballot as a petitioning candidate for the Libertarian Party. However, he changed his voter registration from Democrat to Libertarian shortly before the election.

Office	Candidate	Total Votes	Percentage
Cromwell – Board of Assessment Appeals	Matthew Joseph Long	729	* 11.1
Hartford – Mayor	Aaron Lewis	59	0.6
Meriden – Mayor	Roger Misbach	539	7.4
Meriden – City Council District 1	Richard Cordero	140	14.0
Meriden – City Council District 4	Ellen Misbach	45	1.9
Norwich – City Council	William Russell	442	* 1.8
Plainfield – First Selectman	Daniel Reale	113	4.1
Plainfield – Board of Finance	Scott Charlwood	843	* 18.2
Plainfield – Board of Education	Matthew Radant	956	* 20.8
Trumbull – Councilman District 3	Brandon Cousins	519	* 4.2

=== 2018 ===
Office	Candidate	Total Votes	Percentage
US Senate	Richard Lion	8,838	0.6
US House 2	Daniel Reale	3,305	1.1
Governor	Rod Hanscomb	6,086	0.4
Lieutenant Governor	Jeffrey Thibeault	6,086	0.4
Comptroller	Paul Passarelli	13,165	1.0
Secretary of State	Heather Gwynn	10,361	0.8
Treasurer	Jesse Brohinski	15,514	1.1
G.A. 9	Anthony Armetta	821	12.0
G.A. 65	Kent Johnson	85	1.2
G.A. 83	Roger Misbach	117	1.3
G.A. 91	Gary Walsh	669	7.9

=== 2017 ===
The candidates for Norwich city council received a cumulative 10.2% of the vote (2,786 votes for Libertarian candidates out of a total of 27,352 votes cast for the office.)

Office	Candidate	Total Votes	Percentage
Darien – Representative Town Meeting Member 2	Vincent Arguimbau	251	* 9.4
New Milford – Town Council	Michael Sennello	1,502	* 3.1
Norwich – Mayor	William (Bill) Russell	338	6.5
Norwich – City Council	Richard Bright	504	* 1.8
Norwich – City Council	Nicholas Casiano	397	* 1.5
Norwich – City Council	Stacylynn Cottle	462	* 1.7
Norwich – City Council	James Fear Sr	598	* 2.2
Norwich – City Council	Janice Loomis	464	* 1.7
Norwich – City Council	Justin Massaro	361	* 1.3
Plainfield – First Selectman	Daniel Reale	211	7.7
Plainfield – Board of Education	Matthew Radant	620	* 12.7

=== 2016 ===
Office	Candidate	Total Votes	Percentage
President	Gary Johnson	48,676	3.0
US Senate	Richard Lion	18,190	1.1
US House 2	Daniel Reale	4,949	1.5
G.A. 9	Richard Lion	1,070	12.9
G.A. 35	Austin Coco	195	1.5

=== 2015 ===
Office	Candidate	Total Votes	Percentage
Manchester – Board of Directors	Richard Lion	392	* 0.9

=== 2014 ===
Office	Candidate	Total Votes	Percentage
US House 2	Daniel Reale	2,602	1.1
G.A. 9	Richard Lion	830	14.1

=== 2013 ===
The candidates for Norwich city council received a cumulative 14.0 of the vote (2,868 votes for Libertarian candidates out of a total of 20,442 votes cast for the office).

Office	Candidate	Total Votes	Percentage
Manchester – Board of Directors	Richard Lion	465	* 1.0
Norwich – Mayor	William Russell	386	8.5
Norwich – City Council	Julia Anne Gorham	669	* 3.3
Norwich – City Council	Axel Rodriguez	614	* 3.0
Norwich – City Council	Cyndia Shook	603	* 3.0
Norwich – City Council	Michael Holman	537	* 2.6
Norwich – City Council	Chandler Alfred Jr.	445	* 2.2

=== 2012 ===
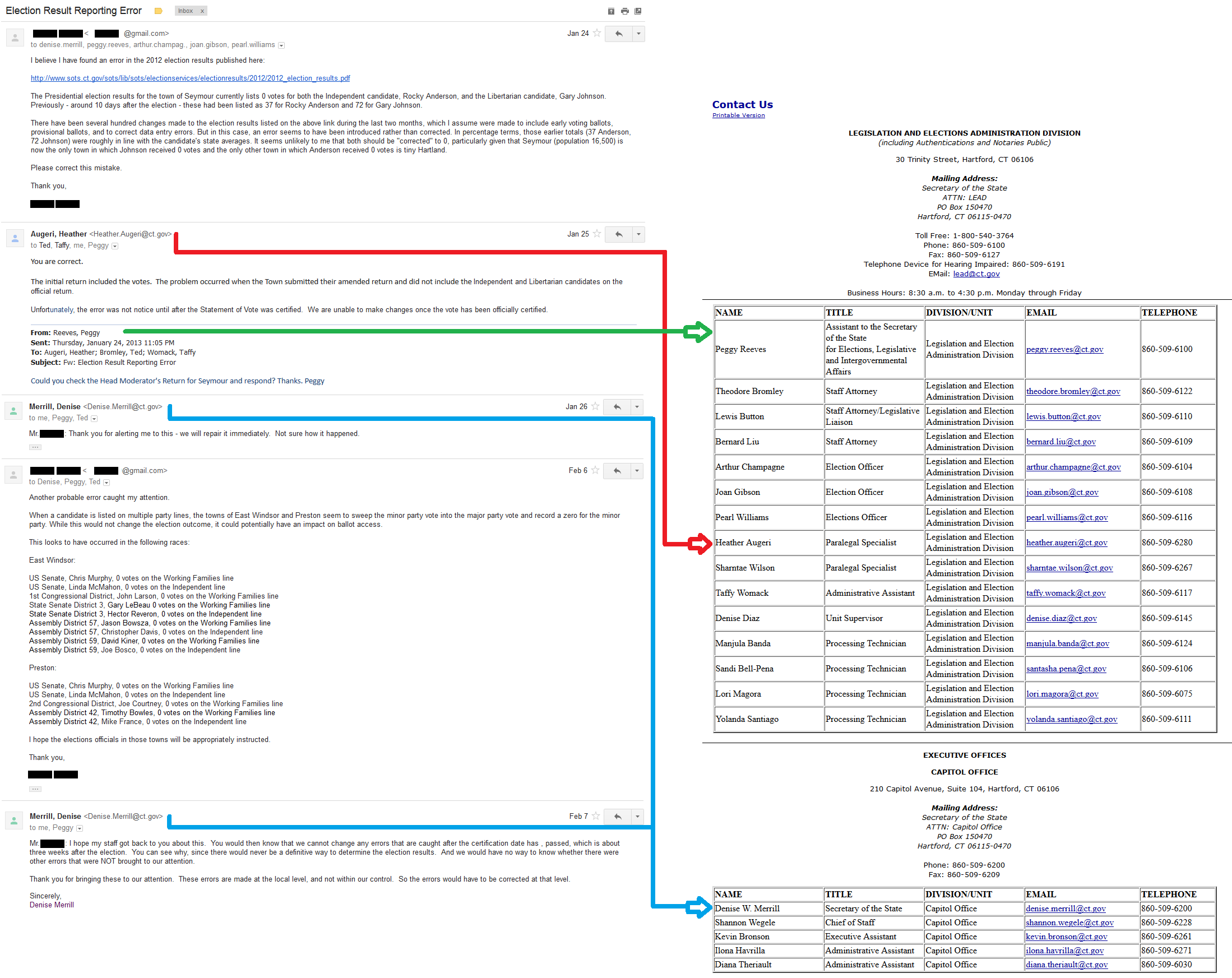
Secretary of the State's office acknowledging 2012 incorrect vote totals

After receiving the largest vote total in Connecticut Libertarian Party history, Paul Passarelli became the party's first US Senate candidate to retain ballot access for that office despite the towns of Middlefield and Washington failing to report any votes for his candidacy to the Secretary of the State. The town of Seymour also inadvertently failed to report any votes for both Libertarian Party Presidential candidate Gary Johnson and Independent Party candidate Rocky Anderson on its amended returns to the Secretary of the State after including the correct totals of 72 votes for Johnson and 37 votes for Anderson on its initial returns. The towns of East Windsor and Preston also inadvertently failed to report any votes for a combined 14 Working Families and Independent Party candidates. The unfortunate cluster of errors was not noticed until after the Statement of Vote was officially certified and changes cannot be made to the Statement of Vote after that time.

Office	Candidate	Total Votes	Percentage
President	Gary Johnson	12,580	0.8
US Senate	Paul Passarelli	25,045	1.7
US House 2	Daniel Reale	3,511	1.2
State Senate 20	Marc Guttman	665	1.7

=== 2010 ===
In 2010 John Szewczyk became the first and only Libertarian Party candidate to appear on the ballot as a cross endorsed candidate for a state or federal office. He was cross endorsed by the Republican, Independent, and Connecticut for Lieberman Parties.

Office	Candidate	Total Votes	Percentage
Secretary of the State	Ken Mosher	8,631	0.8
Comptroller	Joshua Katz	10,328	1.0
State Senate 20	Marc Guttman	699	2.2
G.A. 100	John Szewczyk	100	1.0

=== 2008 ===
Office	Candidate	Total Votes	Percentage
US House 4	Michael Carrano	2,049	0.7
State Senate 20	Marc Guttman	700	1.6

=== 2006 ===
Office	Candidate	Total Votes	Percentage
US House 4	Philip Maymin	3,058	1.5
Secretary of the State	Ken Mosher	13,043	1.3
Treasurer	Steve Edelman	15,354	1.5
Comptroller	Richard Connelly	23,688	2.3
G.A. 5	Richard Lion	77	3.8
G.A. 82	Arline Dunlop	492	7.4

=== 2005 ===
Office	Candidate	Total Votes	Percentage
Meriden – Mayor	Arline Dunlop	1,732	17.3

=== 2004 ===
Office	Candidate	Total Votes	Percentage
President	Michael Badnarik	3,367	0.2
US Senate	Leonard Rasch	9,188	0.6
State Senate 24	John McGowan	297	0.6
G.A. 5	Richard Lion	95	2.6
G.A. 33	Vincent Marotta	152	1.8
G.A. 78	Linda Rasch	315	4.6
G.A. 82	Arline Dunlop	456	6.8

=== 2003 ===
Office	Candidate	Total Votes	Percentage
Hartford – Mayor	Richard Lion	564	5.6
Meriden – Mayor	Arline Dunlop	421	3.4
Windham – Mayor	Lori Jeffers	219	6.1

=== 2002 ===
Office	Candidate	Total Votes	Percentage
US House 5	Walter Gengarelly	1,503	0.7
Secretary of the State	Darlene Nicholas	13,922	1.5
Treasurer	Ken Mosher	12,449	1.3
Comptroller	Leonard Rasch	12,651	1.4
G.A. 33	Vincent Marotta	125	2.2
G.A. 82	Arline Dunlop	158	2.4

=== 2001 ===
Office	Candidate	Total Votes	Percentage
Hartford – Mayor	Richard Lion	260	2.3
Meriden – Mayor	Arline Dunlop	240	1.7
Windham – Mayor	Lori Jeffers	216	5.8

=== 2000 ===
Michael Costanza's 26.1% of the vote in General Assembly District 43 set the Connecticut Libertarian Party record for the highest vote percentage for a state or federal candidate. His 40.2% of the vote in the North Stonington portion of the two town district bested both his Republican and Democratic opponents.

Office	Candidate	Total Votes	Percentage
President	Harry Browne	3,484	0.2
US Senate	Wildey Moore	8,773	0.7
US House 4	Daniel Gislao	2,034	1.0
State Senate 22	Carl Vassar	262	0.7
State Senate 25	Joseph Bucciarelli	460	1.4
State Senate 32	Richard Antico	2,291	7.2
G.A. 11	Richard Connelly	89	1.5
G.A. 33	Vincent Marotta	334	5.9
G.A. 39	Donald Nicholas	307	8.7
G.A. 43	Michael Costanza	2,832	26.1
G.A. 44	Sandra Cote	357	6.4
G.A. 46	William Russell	63	0.9
G.A. 49	William Rood	896	15.9
G.A. 66	George Eggert	379	3.4
G.A. 67	Robert Kinney	179	1.9
G.A. 84	Arline Dunlop	91	1.8
G.A. 98	Ned Vare	434	5.0
G.A. 100	James Madison	86	0.8

=== 1999 ===
Office	Candidate	Total Votes	Percentage
Bethlehem – Mayor	George Eggert	147	10.5
Meriden – Mayor	Arline Dunlop	683	6.5
Oxford – Mayor	John Joy	180	5.9
Windham – Mayor	Ken Mosher	169	5.4

=== 1998 ===
Office	Candidate	Total Votes	Percentage
US Senate	Wildey Moore	5,196	0.5
US House 4	Marshall Harrison	1,449	1.1
Governor	Ned Vare	5,637	0.5
Lieutenant Governor	Robert Loomis	5,637	0.5
Attorney General	Richard Pober	7,537	0.8
Secretary of the State	Ken Mosher	9,920	1.1
Treasurer	Louis Garofalo	11,375	1.3
Comptroller	Steven Edelman	9,207	1.0
State Senate 22	Carl Vassar	175	0.7
State Senate 25	Joseph Bucciarelli	721	4.9
State Senate 32	Dan Fitzgerald	432	1.4
G.A. 11	Richard Connelly	58	1.3
G.A. 39	Darlene Nicholas	54	1.9
G.A. 66	George Eggert	706	10.3

=== 1996 ===
Office	Candidate	Total Votes	Percentage
President	Harry Browne	5,788	0.4
US House 4	Edward Tonkin	2,815	1.4
US House 5	Walter Thiessen	1,391	0.7
State Senate 22	Carl Vassar	696	2.1
State Senate 25	Joseph Bucciarelli	705	2.2
State Senate 32	Wildey Moore	724	1.8
G.A. 60	Richard Loomis	359	5.4
G.A. 66	George Eggert	1,332	12.6

== Finances ==
The finances of the Libertarian Party of Connecticut State Central Committee are public record. Its primary expenditures involve ballot access for candidates. Its second largest expense is its annual convention. Speakers at past conventions include consumer privacy advocate Katherine Albrecht, taxpayer advocate Carla Howell, former Libertarian Party Presidential candidate Michael Badnarik, investment broker Peter Schiff, and Scott Wilson, President of the gun rights advocacy group Connecticut Citizens Defense League. Other large expenses include fundraising expenses and the purchase of literature and products for election advertising, such as yard signs, handouts, and DVDs. It does not have a regularly paid staff.

Year	Contributions from Individuals	Transfers from the National Committee	Transfers from Presidential and other Committees	Sales of Merchandise, Convention Tickets, Advertising, Bank Interest, etc.	Total Receipts	Total Expenses	Cash Balance at Year End
2019	3,985.52	0.00	0.00	321.31	4,306.83	8,456.44	5,060.22
2018	21,147.00	10,000.00	0.00	34,450.00	65,597.00	57,021.54	9,209.83
2017	2,096.00	0.00	0.00	0.00	2,096.00	2,665.13	634.37
2016	6,544.00	41,057.59	0.00	70.00	47,671.59	50,885.36	1,203.50
2015	2,951.62	0.00	0.00	0.00	2,951.62	1,529.10	4,417.27
2014	474.00	0.00	0.00	4.00	478.00	531.12	2,994.75
2013	455.00	0.00	0.00	27.00	482.00	238.83	3,047.87
2012	63,283.63	0.00	21,422.44	0.00	84,706.07	83,762.71	2,804.70
2011	770.00	0.00	0.00	0.00	770.00	3,171.31	2,772.13
2010	1,471.00	0.00	0.00	0.00	1,471.00	3,039.28	4,873.44
2009	4,255.00	0.00	0.00	0.00	4,255.00	5,249.81	6,441.72
2008	3,825.00	0.00	5,000.00	0.00	8,825.00	10,060.05	7,436.53
2007	1,870.00	0.00	0.00	78.00	1,948.00	927.40	8,671.58
2006	1,490.00	1,985.33	0.00	1,195.00	4,670.33	3,364.40	7,650.98
2005	305.00	4,433.00	0.00	289.64	5,027.64	822.00	6,345.05
2004	7,675.51	3,782.00	13,590.00	0.00	25,047.51	25,212.61	2,139.41
2003	1,795.00	3,706.50	0.00	0.52	5,502.02	4,154.72	3,124.51
2002	4,533.00	4,555.50	0.00	682.19	9,770.69	15,466.16	1,777.21
2001	4,121.37	6,672.00	0.00	206.21	10,999.58	5,906.98	7,472.68
2000	8,171.00	7,703.00	25.00	58.12	15,957.12	16,356.43	2,380.08
1999	3,932.00	6,258.00	131.99	563.19	10,885.18	9,309.54	2,694.39
1998	11,512.00	6,602.89	308.27	0.00	18,423.16	20,050.85	1,118.75

== Walter Gengarelly Jr. Award ==
The Connecticut Libertarian Party State Central Committee issues the Walter Gengarelly Jr. Award at its annual convention to a person who has exhibited a "sustained and selfless effort to support the cause of liberty" at "extreme sacrifice to him or herself." Walter Gengarelly spent nearly three decades in service to the Connecticut Libertarian Party. In 1982 he was the party's first Gubernatorial candidate and he died in 2010 in the midst of a campaign for the 5th Congressional District.

Year	Award Recipient
2013	Jonathan Johnson
2013	Bradley (Chelsea) Manning
2010	Michael Badnarik

== See also ==
- List of state parties of the Libertarian Party (United States)
