= Beatrice Murdock =

American politician (died 2004)

Member of the Connecticut House of Representatives from the 17th district
- In office 1981–1989
- Preceded by: James M. Swomley
- Succeeded by: Jessie Stratton

Personal details
- Born: Beatrice Madelyn Knapp; 1933 or 1934 Connecticut, U.S.
- Died: March 28, 2004 (aged 71)
- Party: Republican
- Spouse(s): James Milne Murdock (m. 1954; died 1986) Herbert A. "Bud" France (m. 1988)
- Children: 3
- Education: Mount Holyoke College

Beatrice Madelyn Murdock France (née Knapp; 1933 or 1934 – March 28, 2004) was an American politician who served in the Connecticut House of Representatives from 1981 to 1989, representing the 17th district as a Republican.

== Personal life ==
Beatrice Madelyn Knapp was born in Connecticut. She graduated from Mount Holyoke College in June 1954 and married her first husband, James Milne Murdock, on June 19. They had three children together. James died on August 31, 1986. Beatrice married Herbert A. "Bud" France in 1988, and they were together until Beatrice's death in 2004.

== Political career ==
Murdock was elected to the Connecticut House of Representatives in 1980, and she served four terms representing the 17th district as a Republican. She was a resident of Avon. Murdock did not run for reelection in 1988 and was succeeded by Democratic candidate Jessie Stratton.

== Death ==
Murdock died of ovarian cancer on March 28, 2004, at age 71.
