= 2026 Connecticut elections =

Elections in the U.S. state of Connecticut

A general election was held in the U.S. state of Connecticut in 2026 as part of the 2026 United States elections. Statewide elections are being held for the state's governor, lieutenant governor, comptroller, treasurer, attorney general, and the secretary of the state. Elections were held for the state's five U.S. Representatives, the Connecticut Senate and House of Representatives, and judges of probate. Some municipalities was also hold elections for registrars of voters. There were also be questions on the ballot in certain towns and cities.

== Concerns over ICE at polling places ==
In late August 2026, the Department of Homeland Security told Homeland Security Investigations agents to prioritize home visits questioning people about their voting eligibility in nine states, including Connecticut.

On October 21, a federal judge in California barred those visits in Connecticut and the other eight states when agents know or should suspect the person is a U.S. citizen. The order lasts until polls close on November 3. The judge put it on hold until October 23 to give the government time to appeal.

== Elections ==
- 2026 Connecticut House of Representatives election
- 2026 Connecticut Senate election
- 2026 Connecticut gubernatorial election
- 2026 Connecticut state legislative special elections
- 2026 United States House of Representatives elections in Connecticut
- 2026 Connecticut Attorney General election
- 2026 Connecticut Secretary of the State election
- 2026 Connecticut State Comptroller election
- 2026 Connecticut State Treasurer election
