= Jessie Stratton =

American politician (born 1947)

Member of the Connecticut House of Representatives from the 17th district
- In office January 4, 1989 – January 8, 2003
- Preceded by: Beatrice Murdock
- Succeeded by: Kevin Witkos

Personal details
- Born: February 18, 1947 (age 79) Swarthmore, Pennsylvania, U.S.
- Party: Democratic

Jessie Stratton (born February 18, 1947) is an American politician who served in the Connecticut House of Representatives from the 17th district from 1989 to 2003.
