= Barbara Dunn =

American politician (1926–2017)

Member of the Connecticut House of Representatives from the 17th district
- In office 1967–1971
- Preceded by: Seat established
- Succeeded by: Muriel T. Yacavone

Personal details
- Born: Barbara Baxter; October 26, 1926 Newtown, Connecticut, U.S.
- Died: January 20, 2017 (aged 90)
- Party: Republican
- Spouse(s): William C. "Bill" Dunn (m. 1948) George Andrew Fleming Jr. (m. 1996)
- Children: 4
- Education: University of Connecticut

Barbara Dunn Fleming (née Baxter; October 24, 1926 – January 20, 2017) was an American politician who served in the Connecticut House of Representatives from 1967 to 1971, representing the 17th district as a Republican.

== Personal life ==
Barbara Baxter was born in Newtown, Connecticut, on October 24, 1926. She graduated from the University of Connecticut in 1948 with a degree in physical education and worked as a schoolteacher. She married her first husband, Bill Dunn, on July 3, 1948. They had four children together. She married her second husband, George Fleming, in 1996. They remained married until George died in 2016.

== Political career ==
Dunn was first elected to the Connecticut House of Representatives in 1966, and she served two terms representing the newly established 17th district as a Republican.

== Death ==
Dunn died on January 20, 2017. She was 90.
