= Muriel T. Yacavone =

American politician (1920–2012)

Member of the Connecticut House of Representatives from the 17th district
- In office 1971–1973
- Preceded by: Barbara Dunn
- Succeeded by: Morris N. Cohen

Member of the Connecticut House of Representatives from the 9th district
- In office 1973–1983
- Preceded by: Howard M. Klebanoff
- Succeeded by: Donald F. Bates

Personal details
- Born: May 26, 1920 Hartford, Connecticut, U.S.
- Died: December 18, 2012 (aged 92) Hartford, Connecticut, U.S.
- Party: Democratic
- Spouses: John P. Yacavone; John G. Gannon

Muriel T. Yacavone (May 26, 1920 – December 18, 2012) was an American politician who served in the Connecticut House of Representatives from 1971 to 1983. A Democrat, she represented the 17th district from 1971 to 1973 and the 9th district from 1973 to 1983.

== Personal life ==
Yacavone was born in Hartford, Connecticut, on May 26, 1920. In 1938, after graduating from William H. Hall High School, she joined The Rockettes. During World War II, Yacavone enlisted in the U.S. Marine Corps. She was married to John P. Yacavone, and later to John G. Gannon.

Yacavone died on December 18, 2012, in Hartford. She was 92.

== Career ==
A Democrat, Yacavone was first elected to the Connecticut House of Representatives in 1970, and she began her first term in 1971. From 1971 to 1973, she represented the 17th district. From 1973 to 1983, she represented the 9th district, which encompasses parts of East Hartford and Manchester. She served six terms in total and did not run for reelection in 1982. She left office in 1983 and was succeeded by Donald F. Bates.

Following her service in the House of Representatives, she worked for the Connecticut Department of Public Health. In 2003, she was elected to South Windsor's town council.
