= Elsie Swensson =

American politician (died 2004)

Member of the Connecticut House of Representatives from the 13th district
- In office 1981–1987
- Preceded by: Francis J. Mahoney
- Succeeded by: John W. Thompson

Personal details
- Born: Elsie Drinkwater; 1921 or 1922
- Died: October 8, 2004 (aged 82)
- Party: Republican
- Spouse: Joseph L. Swensson (m. 1951; died 1991)
- Children: 3

Elsie Swensson (died October 8, 2004) was an American politician who served in the Connecticut House of Representatives from 1981 to 1987, representing the 13th district as a Republican.
