= Leslee Hill =

American Republican politician

Member of the Connecticut House of Representatives from the 17th district
- In office January 2019 – January 2021
- Preceded by: Timothy LeGeyt
- Succeeded by: Eleni Kavros DeGraw

Personal details
- Party: Republican
- Spouse: Richard Hill
- Education: Providence College (BA); Western New England University (JD)

Leslee Hill is an American Republican Party politician who served as a member of the Connecticut House of Representatives from the 17th district from 2019 to 2021. Hill was first elected in 2018, narrowly defeating Democrat Eleni Kavros DeGraw, who she would later lose to in 2020.

== Career ==
Hill previously practiced law, with a focus in commercial and bank litigation, and served on the finance board for the town of Southborough, Massachusetts. Hill was appointed to the Canton Board of Education in 2008, and was subsequently elected Chair in 2012. Hill was later elected as the First Selectman of Canton in 2015. After her election to the Connecticut House of Representatives in 2018, Hill served on the House's Education, Finance, and Judiciary Committees, until her defeat in the 2020 election.

== Personal life ==
Hill lived in Canton, Connecticut from 1995 to 1998, and from 2004 onward. She previously lived in Southborough, Massachusetts, and has worked with local Republicans in both towns.

Hill is married to her husband Richard, with whom she shares two daughters.

== Electoral history ==
2018 Connecticut State House of Representatives election, District 17
Party	Candidate	Votes	%
Republican	Leslee Hill	6,004	48.3%
Independent Party	Leslee Hill	274	2.2%
Total	Leslee Hill	6,278	50.5%
Democratic	Eleni Kavros DeGraw	5,929	47.7%
Working Families	Eleni Kavros DeGraw	230	1.8%
Total	Eleni Kavros DeGraw	6,159	49.5%
Total votes		12,437	100%
Republican hold			

2020 Connecticut State House of Representatives election, District 17
Party	Candidate	Votes	%
Democratic	Eleni Kavros DeGraw	7,575	50.13
Working Families	Eleni Kavros DeGraw	257	1.70
Total	Eleni Kavros DeGraw	7,832	51.83
Republican	Leslee Hill	6,971	46.13
Independent Party	Leslee Hill	309	2.04
Total	Leslee Hill (Incumbent)	7,280	48.17
Democratic gain from Republican			
