= Timothy LeGeyt =

American politician

Member of the Connecticut House of Representatives from the 17th district
- In office January 7, 2009 – January 9, 2019
- Preceded by: Kevin Witkos
- Succeeded by: Leslee Hill

Personal details
- Born: 1951 (age 74–75)
- Party: Republican (before 2024); Independent (2024–present)

Timothy LeGeyt (born 1951) is an American politician who served in the Connecticut House of Representatives from the 17th district from 2009 to 2019.
