= Mark Tweedie =

American politician

Member of the Connecticut House of Representatives from the 13th district
- In office January 7, 2015 – January 9, 2019
- Preceded by: Joe Diminico
- Succeeded by: Jason Doucette

Personal details
- Born: September 29, 1956 (age 69) Manchester, Connecticut, U.S.
- Party: Republican

Mark Tweedie (born September 29, 1956) is an American politician who served in the Connecticut House of Representatives from the 13th district from 2015 to 2019.
