= Kelly Juleson-Scopino =

American politician

Member of the Connecticut House of Representatives from the 12th district
- In office 2015–2019
- Preceded by: Geoff Luxenberg
- Succeeded by: Geoff Luxenberg

Personal details
- Party: Democratic

Kelly Juleson-Scopino (formerly Kelly Luxenberg) is an American former politician who served in the Connecticut House of Representatives from 2015 to 2019, representing the 12th district as a Democrat. She lived in Manchester during her tenure and did not run for reelection in 2018.
