= Michael Winkler =

American Artist

Michael Winkler (Michael Joseph Winkler, born 1952 in Lima, Ohio) is a visual/conceptual artist. His work has a following, not only in the visual arts, but in the literary community and a range of other disciplines. The broad interest is primarily the result of what he has published in books, art and literary magazines, and academic journals.

His art explores process-based abstract imagery that reveals a hidden patterning in the signs of language. These patterns, encoded in the orthography or spelling of words, are often inexplicably meaningful. The patterns were created unintentionally as a result of the natural evolution of linguistic signs, so it is possible they may reflect aspects of awareness associated with our innate ability to conceptualize meaning.

The appearance of word-related meaning in the signs of language challenges the idea that they are arbitrary, a belief that is at the foundation of linguistics, post-structuralist philosophy (Husserl, Barthes, Baudrillard, Derrida) and cultural theory—this belief rests entirely on an assumption made a century ago that isn't supported by recent research into how linguistic signs are perceived and processed. Nevertheless, acceptance that our linguistic ancestors intuitively structured the signs in relation to the meaning of the words requires acknowledgement of an innate level of attunement that is unprecedented (despite the fact that many of our most celebrated abstract artists (abstract expressionists) have based their work on the firm belief that innate or intuitive behavior is capable of constructing genuine expressions of human awareness). An in-depth discussion of the patterning and its implications is presented in a chapter of Winkler's memoir accessible on Philpapers.

Exploration of the patterning and its implications has taken form in a wide variety of media. Work has been exhibited at: Kassel Art Museum (Kassler Kunstverein), Germany; Museum of Contemporary Art, Chicago; Contemporary Art Museum, Houston; Kansas City Art Institute; Academy of Fine Art, Poznan, Poland; and other galleries and museums in the US and Europe. Retrospectives have been presented by the University of Pennsylvania (2004) and New Arts Program (2017). Documentation of his ongoing project and limited edition books are archived in the special collections of libraries and museums such as: The Museum of Modern Art and Brooklyn Museum; The Smithsonian, New York Public Library, and academic institutions such as Yale, Stanford, U.Chicago, and UCLA.

Major commissions include a project for Daimler Mercedes-Benz in 2015.

Awards include: a Visual Artists Fellowship from the National Endowment for the Arts; A Special Projects Fellowship from the Pennsylvania Council on the Arts; a LINE II Association Book Award; and a Special Members Award from the American Society of Composers, Authors, & Publishers.
