= Eleni Kavros DeGraw =

American politician

- Kavros DeGraw in 2026

Member of the Connecticut House of Representatives from the 17th district
- Incumbent
- Assumed office January 6, 2021
- Preceded by: Leslee Hill

Personal details
- Born: Eleni C. Kavros; 1975 (age 50–51) Honolulu, Hawaii, U.S.
- Party: Democratic
- Education: James Madison University (BA)

Eleni Kavros DeGraw (born 1975) is an American politician serving as a member of the Connecticut House of Representatives from the 17th district. Elected in November 2020, she assumed office on January 6, 2021.

== Early life and education ==
Kavros DeGraw was born in Honolulu and raised in Alexandria, Virginia. She earned a Bachelor of Arts degree in English, with a minor in technical writing, from James Madison University.

== Career ==
Kavros DeGraw worked as a journalist and marketing writer. She first ran for office in 2018. In 2019, she was the campaign manager for Derek Slap. Kavros DeGraw was elected to the Connecticut House of Representatives in November 2020 and assumed office on January 6, 2021. Kavros DeGraw is the co-chair of the Planning and Development Committee. She was re-elected as state representative on November 8, 2022.

== Electoral history ==
2018 Connecticut's 17th House of Representatives district election
Party	Candidate	Votes	%	±%
Republican	Leslee Hill	6,278	50.48%	−49.52%
Democratic	Eleni Kavros DeGraw	6,159	49.52%	+49.52%
Total votes		12,437	100.0%	
Republican hold				

2020 Connecticut's 17th House of Representatives district election
Party	Candidate	Votes	%	±%
Democratic	Eleni Kavros DeGraw	7,832	51.83%	+2.31%
Republican	Leslee Hill (incumbent)	7,280	48.17%	−2.31%
Total votes		15,112	100.0%	
Democratic gain from Republican				

2022 Connecticut's 17th House of Representatives district election
Party	Candidate	Votes	%	±%
Democratic	Eleni Kavros DeGraw (incumbent)	7,010	56.92%	+5.09%
Republican	Heather Maguire	5,306	43.08%	−5.09%
Total votes		12,316	100.0%	
Democratic hold				

2024 Connecticut's 17th House of Representatives district election
Party	Candidate	Votes	%	±%
Democratic	Eleni Kavros DeGraw (incumbent)	9,128	62.87%	+5.95%
Republican	Manju Gerber	5,391	37.13%	−5.95%
Total votes		14,519	100.0%	
Democratic hold				
