= Jason Doucette =

American politician from Connecticut

Member of the Connecticut House of Representatives from the 13th district
- Incumbent
- Assumed office January 9, 2019
- Preceded by: Mark Tweedie

Personal details
- Born: January 23, 1977 (age 49)
- Party: Democratic
- Education: Washington University in St. Louis (BA); University of Connecticut (JD)

Jason Edward Doucette (born January 23, 1977) is an American politician who is the member of the Connecticut House of Representatives from the 13th district in Hartford County. He is a Democrat.

== Education and career ==
Doucette, a Democrat, is an attorney. He earned his bachelor's degree from Washington University in St. Louis and his J.D. from the University of Connecticut School of Law.

Prior to joining the Connecticut House of Representatives, Doucette was a member of the Manchester Board of Directors (2006–07) and served on various zoning and planning committees and boards. The 13th House District includes parts of the towns of Manchester and Glastonbury. Doucette was first elected to the state House in the general election on November 6, 2018, winning 59% of the vote and defeating Republican candidate Jennifer Fiereck, who received 41%. The seat flipped from Republican to Democrat, as Doucette won the seat formerly held by Republican Mark Tweedie, who did not seek reelection.

He took office in January 2019. He was reelected in November 2020 with about 63% of the vote, defeating Republican challenger Brian Marois, who received 37%. He was reelected again in 2022 and in 2024.

== Personal life ==
Doucette is married and has two children. He lives in Manchester.
