= Connecticut's 12th House of Representatives district =

American legislative district

Connecticut's 12th State House of Representatives district
Representative
| Geoff Luxenberg; D |

Connecticut's 12th House of Representatives district elects one member of the Connecticut House of Representatives. It encompasses part of Manchester. It has been represented by Democrat Geoff Luxenberg since 2019.

== List of representatives ==
List of representatives from Connecticut's 12th State House district
| Representative | Party | Years | District home | Note |
|---|---|---|---|---|
| David H. Neidlitz | Democratic | 1967–1973 | West Hartford | Seat created |
| Donald S. Genovesi | Republican | 1973–1975 | Manchester | |
| Theodore R. Cummings | Democratic | 1975–1979 | Manchester | |
| Walter H. Joyner | Republican | 1979–1983 | Manchester | |
| James R. McCavanagh | Democratic | 1983–1999 | Manchester | |
| David H. Blackwell | Republican | 1999–2003 | Manchester | |
| Ryan P. Barry | Democratic | 2003–2011 | Manchester | |
| Geoff Luxenberg | Democratic | 2011–2015 | Manchester | |
| Kelly Juleson-Scopino | Democratic | 2015–2019 | Manchester | |
| Geoff Luxenberg | Democratic | 2019– | Manchester | |

== Recent elections ==
=== 2020 ===
2020 Connecticut State House of Representatives election, District 12
| Party | Candidate | Votes | % |
|---|---|---|---|
| Democratic | Geoff Luxenberg (incumbent) | 7,457 | 63.69 |
| Republican | Jeff Sullivan | 3,841 | 32.80 |
| Working Families | Geoff Luxenberg (incumbent) | 411 | 3.51 |
| Total votes | | 11,709 | 100.00 |
| Democratic hold | | | |

=== 2018 ===
2018 Connecticut State House of Representatives election, District 12
| Party | Candidate | Votes | % |
|---|---|---|---|
| Democratic | Geoff Luxenberg (incumbent) | 5,656 | 62.8 |
| Republican | Thomas Tierney | 3,345 | 37.2 |
| Total votes | | 9,001 | 100.00 |
| Democratic hold | | | |

=== 2016 ===
2016 Connecticut State House of Representatives election, District 12
| Party | Candidate | Votes | % |
|---|---|---|---|
| Democratic | Kelly Juleson-Scopino (incumbent) | 6,313 | 61.21 |
| Republican | John Topping | 4,000 | 38.79 |
| Total votes | | 10,313 | 100.00 |
| Democratic hold | | | |

=== 2014 ===
2014 Connecticut State House of Representatives election, District 12
| Party | Candidate | Votes | % |
|---|---|---|---|
| Democratic | Kelly Juleson-Scopino (incumbent) | 3,848 | 56.6 |
| Republican | Jeff Sullivan | 2,611 | 38.4 |
| Working Families | Kelly Juleson-Scopino (incumbent) | 338 | 5.0 |
| Total votes | | 6,797 | 100.00 |
| Democratic hold | | | |

=== 2012 ===
2012 Connecticut State House of Representatives election, District 12
| Party | Candidate | Votes | % |
|---|---|---|---|
| Democratic | Geoff Luxenberg (incumbent) | 6,074 | 63.3 |
| Republican | Timothy M. Devanney | 3,520 | 36.7 |
| Total votes | | 9,594 | 100.00 |
| Democratic hold | | | |
