= Connecticut's 13th House of Representatives district =

American legislative district

Connecticut's 13th State House of Representatives district
Representative
Jason Edward Doucette; D

Connecticut's 13th House of Representatives district elects one member of the Connecticut House of Representatives. It encompasses parts of Manchester and Glastonbury. It has been represented by Democrat Jason Edward Doucette since 2019.

== List of representatives ==
List of Representatives from Connecticut's 13th House District
Representative	Party	Years	District home	Note
Nicholas A. Lenge	Republican	1967–1969	West Hartford	Seat created
Robert W. Barrows	Democratic	1969–1971	West Hartford	
Nicholas A. Lenge	Republican	1971–1973	West Hartford	
Francis J. Mahoney	Democratic	1973–1981	Manchester	
Elsie Swensson	Republican	1981–1987	Manchester	
John W. Thompson	Democratic	1987–2013	Manchester	
Joe Diminico	Democratic	2013–2015	Manchester	
Mark Tweedie	Republican	2015–2019	Manchester	
Jason Doucette	Democratic	2019–	Manchester	

== Recent elections ==
=== 2020 ===
2020 Connecticut State House of Representatives election, District 13
Party	Candidate	Votes	%
Democratic	Jason Doucette (incumbent)	7,803	60.38
Republican	Brian Marois	4,553	35.23
Working Families	Jason Doucette (incumbent)	352	2.72
Independent Party	Brian Marois	216	1.67
Total votes		12,924	100.00
Democratic hold			

=== 2018 ===
2018 Connecticut State House of Representatives election, District 13
Party	Candidate	Votes	%
Democratic	Jason Doucette (incumbent)	6,031	58.3
Republican	Jennifer Fiereck	4,308	41.7
Total votes		10,339	100.00
Democratic gain from Republican			

=== 2016 ===
2016 Connecticut State House of Representatives election, District 13
Party	Candidate	Votes	%
Republican	Mark Tweedie (incumbent)	5,912	51.15
Democratic	Joe Diminico	5,647	48.85
Total votes		11,559	100.00
Republican hold			

=== 2014 ===
2014 Connecticut State House of Representatives election, District 13
Party	Candidate	Votes	%
Republican	Mark Tweedie	4,282	52.5
Democratic	Joe Diminico (Incumbent)	3,876	47.5
Total votes		8,158	100.00
Republican gain from Democratic			

=== 2012 ===
2012 Connecticut State House of Representatives election, District 13
Party	Candidate	Votes	%
Democratic	Joe Diminico	5,449	54.7
Republican	Mark Tweedie	4,519	45.3
Total votes		9,968	100.00
Democratic hold			
