= Connecticut's 9th House of Representatives district =

American legislative district

Connecticut's 9th State House of Representatives district
Representative
Jason Rojas; D

Connecticut's 9th House of Representatives district elects one member of the Connecticut House of Representatives. Its current representative is Jason Rojas. The district consists of parts of the cities of East Hartford and Manchester and parts of the town of Glastonbury.

== List of representatives ==
List of Representatives from Connecticut's 9th State House District
Representative	Party	Years	District home	Note
David S. Cohn	Democratic	1967–1969	Hartford	Seat created
Howard M. Klebanoff	Democratic	1969–1973	Hartford	
Muriel T. Yacavone	Democratic	1973–1983	East Hartford	
Donald F. Bates	Democratic	1983–1989	East Hartford	
Paul Munns	Republican	1989–1995	Manchester	
Richard D. Veltri	Republican	1995–1999	East Hartford	
Christopher Stone	Democratic	1999–2009	East Hartford	Did not run for reelection
Jason Rojas	Democratic	2009–present	East Hartford	Incumbent

== Recent elections ==
State Election 2022: House District 9
Party	Candidate	Votes	%	±%
Democratic	Jason Rojas	4,741	66.8	
Republican	Matthew Lauf	2,356	33.2	
Majority		2,385	33.6	
Turnout		7,097		
Democratic hold		Swing		

State Election 2008: House District 9
Party	Candidate	Votes	%	±%
Democratic	Jason Rojas	7,024	54.6	−14.0
Republican	Clifton E. Thompson	5,200	40.4	+13.0
Working Families	Jason Rojas	636	4.9	+1.0
Majority		2,535	19.7	−21.5
Turnout		12,860		
Democratic hold		Swing	-13.0	

Democratic Primary, August 12, 2008: House District 9
Party	Candidate	Votes	%	±%
Democratic	Jason Rojas	636	53.4	
Democratic	Joseph S. Hachey	554	46.6	
Majority		82	6.9	
Turnout		1,190		

State Election 2006: House District 9
Party	Candidate	Votes	%	±%
Democratic	Christopher R. Stone	6,879	68.6	−25.9
Republican	Daniel Moura	2,750	27.4	+27.4
Working Families	Geronimo Valdez	387	3.9	−1.6
Majority		4,129	41.2	−37.8
Turnout		10,034		
Democratic hold		Swing	-26.7	

State Election 2004: House District 9
Party	Candidate	Votes	%	±%
Democratic	Christopher R. Stone	8,759	94.5	+31.5
Working Families	Herbert E. Sullivan, Jr.	509	5.5	+5.5
Majority		8,250	89.0	+63.0
Turnout		9,268		
Democratic hold		Swing	+25.0	

State Election 2002: House District 9
Party	Candidate	Votes	%	±%
Democratic	Christopher R. Stone	6,251	63.0	−1.5
Republican	Ron Osella	3,673	37.0	+1.5
Majority		2,578	26.0	−2.9
Turnout		9,924		
Democratic hold		Swing	-1.5	

State Election 2000: House District 9
Party	Candidate	Votes	%	±%
Democratic	Christopher R. Stone	7,358	64.5	+11.4
Republican	Dennis A. Brenner	4,055	35.5	−11.4
Majority		3,303	28.9	+22.7
Turnout		11,413		
Democratic hold		Swing	+11.4	

State Election 1998: House District 9
Party	Candidate	Votes	%	±%
Democratic	Christopher R. Stone	4,847	53.1	
Republican	Richard D. Veltri	4,282	46.9	
Majority		565	6.2	
Turnout		9,129		
Democratic hold		Swing		
