= Jason Rojas =

American politician

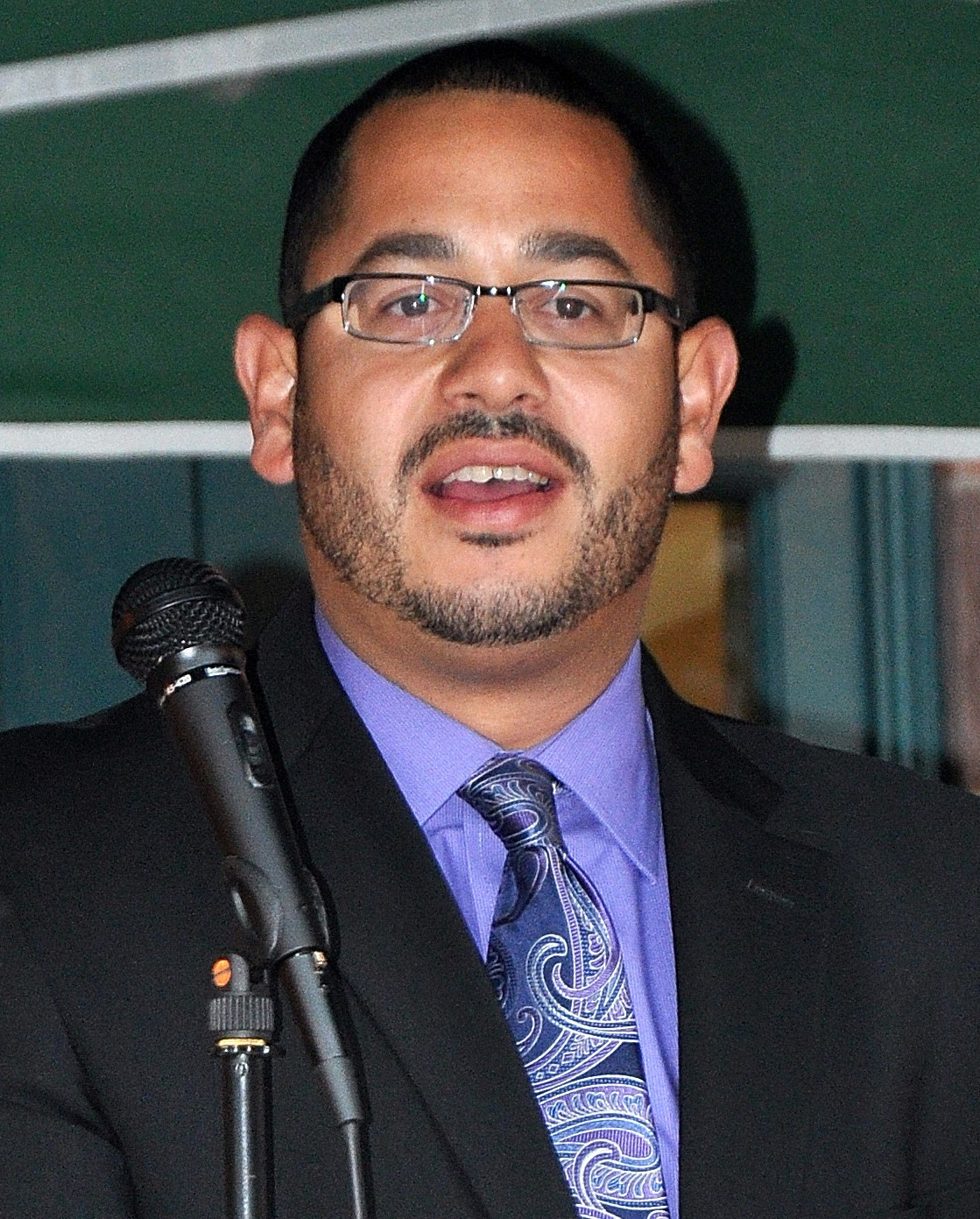

Majority Leader of the Connecticut House of Representatives
- Incumbent
- Assumed office January 6, 2021
- Preceded by: Matthew Ritter

Member of the Connecticut House of Representatives from the 9th district
- Incumbent
- Assumed office January 7, 2009
- Preceded by: Christopher Stone

Personal details
- Born: 1976 (age 49–50) East Hartford, Connecticut, U.S.
- Party: Democratic
- Spouse: Sarah
- Education: University of Connecticut (BA); Trinity College (MA)
- Website: State House website

Jason Rojas (born 1976) is an American politician who is a nine term Democratic member of the Connecticut House of Representatives, serving since 2008. He represents parts of East Hartford and Manchester, composing Connecticut's 9th assembly district. He currently serves as the Connecticut House Majority Leader.

== Early life and family ==
Rojas is an East Hartford native, attending East Hartford Public schools, and becoming the first in his family to graduate from college. He received a degree in history from the University of Connecticut and later received a master's degree in Public Policy from Trinity College. Jason married his high school sweetheart Sarah, and they have three children.

== Political career ==
He began his public service career serving on the East Hartford Board of Education. After three years he was elected to the town council in East Hartford. Then, in 2008, he ran for State Representative in Connecticut's 9th Assembly District after the incumbent, Christopher Stone, stepped down. Jason Rojas won the election by 2,460 votes against his Republican opponent Clifton Thomson. In 2010, he was reelected, defeating Republican Dennis Brenner by 1056 votes. In 2012 he won by 4,505 votes, and in 2014 by 4,224 votes. In 2016 he ran unopposed.

== Political views ==
=== Housing ===
In 2015, with representative Minnie Gonzalez, Rojas proposed a housing bill that would require 75 percent of all new affordable housing projects to be built in affluent neighborhoods to counter the current practice of building federally subsidized low-income housing in the poorest neighborhoods. The bill got out-of-state attention by for example the New York Times, but it died without receiving a vote.

Colorado House of Representatives
Preceded by Matthew Ritter	Majority Leader of the Connecticut House of Representatives; 2021–present	Incumbent
