= Geoff Luxenberg =

American politician (born 1983)

Member of the Connecticut House of Representatives from the 12th district
- Incumbent
- Assumed office 2019
- Preceded by: Kelly Juleson-Scopino
- In office 2011–2015
- Preceded by: John W. Thompson
- Succeeded by: Kelly Juleson-Scopino

Personal details
- Born: October 20, 1983 (age 43)
- Party: Democratic
- Education: North Carolina State University (BA)

Geoffrey R. Luxenberg (born October 20, 1983) is an elected official in the Connecticut General Assembly. He served in office from 2011 to 2015, and was re-elected in 2018 where he currently represents the 12th Assembly District of Manchester, Connecticut.

== Biography ==
Luxenberg was born on October 20, 1983, in Connecticut. He graduated from Hall High School in 2002. In 2005 he graduated from North Carolina State University. He also owned and operated a small business. He is Jewish.

Luxenberg served on the Manchester Board of Education, where he introduced the first Connecticut municipal level, “Achievement Gap” task force designed to address disparities in educational outcomes. He was the former vice president of the Manchester Foundation for Public Schools and served on the Commission for Elderly Services and People with Disabilities for the Town of Manchester.

Luxenberg serves as state representative for the 12th House District of the Connecticut House of Representatives, where he represents Manchester. He is a member of the Judiciary, Labor and General Law Committees. He served in the Connecticut General Assembly from 2011 to 2015. He was re-elected to the same seat in 2018.

Luxenberg is the Community Engagement Manager at Gather 55, a volunteer restaurant.

He has one daughter.

== Political career ==
During his first term in the General Assembly, Luxenberg secured $300,000 in state funds to complete Manchester's sidewalk upgrade project and $450,000 for the renovation of Whiton Library. He was instrumental in passing a law to divest state resources from Iran, helped cut the business entity tax for small businesses to once every other year and supported the Earned Income Tax Credit (EITC.

In 2013, he took on a number of initiatives including expanding awareness on illnesses and diseases that affect children and seniors, and he fought to preserve funding for the Children's Trust Fund to prevent child abuse and neglect.

In his first term, he served as the Vice Chair of the Banks Committee. He sat on the Finance, Review, and Bonding Committee and the Committee on Veteran's Affairs.
