= Connecticut's 17th House of Representatives district =

American legislative district

Connecticut's 17th State House of Representatives district
Representative
Eleni Kavros DeGraw; D

Connecticut's 17th House of Representatives district elects one member of the Connecticut House of Representatives. It consists of the town of Canton and part of Avon. It has been represented by Democrat Eleni Kavros DeGraw since 2021.

== List of representatives ==
List of representatives from Connecticut's 17th State House district
Representative	Party	Years	District home	Note
Barbara Dunn	Republican	1967–1971	East Hartford	Seat created
Muriel T. Yacavone	Democratic	1971–1973	East Hartford	
Morris N. Cohen	Democratic	1973–1977	Bloomfield	
James M. Swomley	Republican	1977–1981	Bloomfield	
Beatrice Murdock	Republican	1981–1989	Avon	
Jessie Stratton	Democratic	1989–2003	Canton	
Kevin Witkos	Republican	2003–2009	Canton	
Timothy LeGeyt	Republican	2009–2019	Canton	
Leslee Hill	Republican	2019–2021	Canton	
Eleni Kavros DeGraw	Democratic	2021–	Avon	

== Recent Elections ==
=== 2020 ===
2020 Connecticut State House of Representatives election, District 17
Party	Candidate	Votes	%
Democratic	Eleni Kavros DeGraw	7,575	50.13
Republican	Leslee Hill (incumbent)	6,971	46.13
Independent Party	Leslee Hill (incumbent	309	2.04
Working Families	Eleni Kavros DeGraw	257	1.70
Total votes		15,112	100.00
Democratic gain from Republican			

=== 2018 ===
2018 Connecticut State House of Representatives election, District 17
Party	Candidate	Votes	%
Republican	Leslee Hill	6,287	50.5
Democratic	Eleni Kavros DeGraw	6,159	49.5
Total votes		12,437	100.00
Republican hold			

=== 2016 ===
2018 Connecticut State House of Representatives election, District 17
Party	Candidate	Votes	%
Republican	Timothy LeGeyt	10,337	100.0
Total votes		10,337	100.00
Republican gain from			

=== 2014 ===
2018 Connecticut State House of Representatives election, District 17
Party	Candidate	Votes	%
Republican	Timothy LeGeyt	7,524	100.0
Total votes		7,524	100.00
Republican gain from			

=== 2012 ===
2018 Connecticut State House of Representatives election, District 17
Party	Candidate	Votes	%
Republican	Timothy LeGeyt	7,627	60.0
Democratic	David Pena	5,111	40.0
Total votes		12,783	100.00
Republican hold			
