= 2024 Connecticut House of Representatives election =

2024 Connecticut House of Representatives elections
- November 5, 2024

All 151 seats in the Connecticut House of Representatives 76 seats needed for a majority
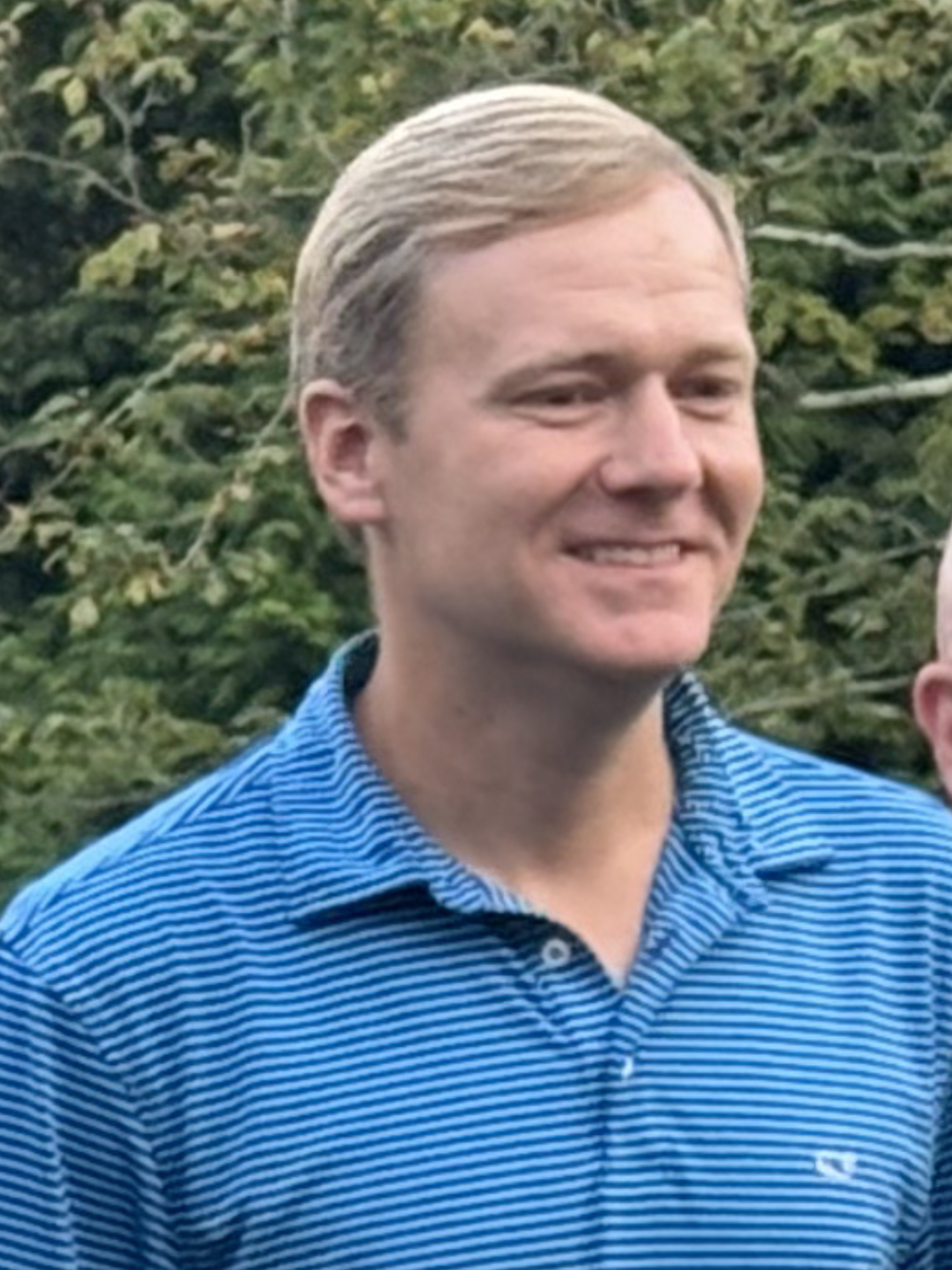

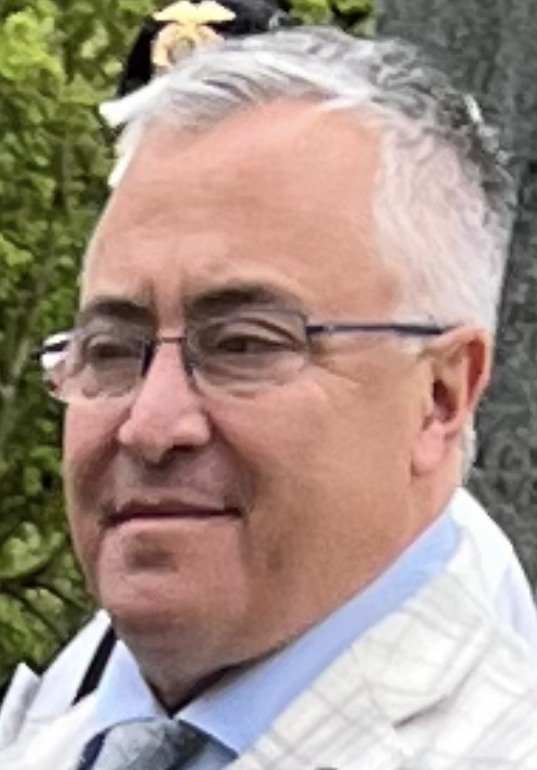
	Majority party	Minority party
Leader	Matthew Ritter	Vincent Candelora
Party	Democratic	Republican
Leader's seat	1st district	86th district
Last election	98	53
Seats won	102	49
Seat change	▲4	▼4
Popular vote	887,403	686,796
Percentage	56.12%	43.43%
- Results: Democratic gain Republican gain Democratic hold Republican hold
Speaker before election
Matthew Ritter
Democratic
Elected Speaker
Matthew Ritter
Democratic

The 2024 Connecticut House of Representatives election was held on November 5, 2024, alongside the 2024 United States elections. Primary elections took place on August 14, 2024. Democrats gained a two-thirds majority in the state house, and along with expanding their Senate majority, were able to achieve a supermajority in both chambers of the state legislature. This allowed them to override any veto by governor Ned Lamont.

== Retirements ==
Eleven incumbents did not seek re-election.

=== Democrats ===
1. District 11: Jeffrey Currey retired.
2. District 26: Peter Tercyak retired.
3. District 36: Christine Palm retired.
4. District 42: Keith Denning retired.
5. District 58: Tom Arnone retired.
6. District 91: Michael D'Agostino retired.
7. District 94: Robyn Porter retired.

=== Republicans ===
1. District 51: Rick Hayes retired.
2. District 69: Cindy Harrison retired.
3. District 117: Charles Ferraro retired.
4. District 131: David Labriola retired.

== Incumbents defeated ==
Two incumbents, both Stamford Democrats, were defeated in the August 14th primary election.

=== In primary election ===
==== Democrats ====
1. District 146: David Michel lost re-nomination to Eilish Collins Main.
2. District 148: Anabel Figueroa lost re-nomination to Jonathan Jacobson.

=== In general election ===
==== Republicans ====
1. District 22: Francis Cooley lost re-election to Rebecca Martinez.
2. District 37: Holly Cheeseman lost re-election to Nick Menapace.
3. District 38: Kathleen McCarty lost re-election to Nick Gauthier.
4. District 120: Laura Dancho lost re-election to Kaitlyn Shake.
5. District 138: Rachel Chaleski lost re-election to Ken Gucker.

==== Democrats ====
1. District 65: Michelle Cook lost re-election to Joe Canino.
2. District 149: Rachel Khanna lost re-election to Tina Courpas.

== Predictions ==
Source	Ranking	As of
CNalysis	Solid D	June 11, 2024
Sabato's Crystal Ball	Safe D	June 18, 2024

== Summary of results ==
Italics denote an open seat held by the incumbent party; bold text denotes a gain for a party.

State House District	Incumbent	Party	Elected Representative	Outcome
1	Matthew Ritter	Dem	Matthew Ritter	Dem Hold
2	Raghib Allie-Brennan	Dem	Raghib Allie-Brennan	Dem Hold
3	Minnie Gonzalez	Dem	Minnie Gonzalez	Dem Hold
4	Julio Concepcion	Dem	Julio Concepcion	Dem Hold
5	Maryam Khan	Dem	Maryam Khan	Dem Hold
6	James "Jimmy" Sánchez	Dem	James "Jimmy" Sánchez	Dem Hold
7	Joshua M. Hall	Dem	Joshua M. Hall	Dem Hold
8	Tim Ackert	Rep	Tim Ackert	Rep Hold
9	Jason Rojas	Dem	Jason Rojas	Dem Hold
10	Henry Genga	Dem	Henry Genga	Dem Hold
11	Jeffrey Currey	Dem	Patrick Biggins	Dem Hold
12	Geoff Luxenberg	Dem	Geoff Luxenberg	Dem Hold
13	Jason Doucette	Dem	Jason Doucette	Dem Hold
14	Tom Delnicki	Rep	Tom Delnicki	Rep Hold
15	Bobby Gibson	Dem	Bobby Gibson	Dem Hold
16	Melissa Osborne	Dem	Melissa Osborne	Dem Hold
17	Eleni Kavros DeGraw	Dem	Eleni Kavros DeGraw	Dem Hold
18	Jillian Gilchrest	Dem	Jillian Gilchrest	Dem Hold
19	Tammy Exum	Dem	Tammy Exum	Dem Hold
20	Kate Farrar	Dem	Kate Farrar	Dem Hold
21	Mike Demicco	Dem	Mike Demicco	Dem Hold
22	Francis Cooley	Rep	**Rebecca Martinez**	**Dem Gain**
23	Devin Carney	Rep	Devin Carney	Rep Hold
24	Emmanuel "Manny" Sanchez	Dem	Emmanuel "Manny" Sanchez	Dem Hold
25	Robert "Bobby" Sanchez	Dem	Robert "Bobby" Sanchez	Dem Hold
26	Peter Tercyak	Dem	David DeFronzo	Dem Hold
27	Gary Turco	Dem	Gary Turco	Dem Hold
28	Amy Morrin Bello	Dem	Amy Morrin Bello	Dem Hold
29	Kerry Szeps Wood	Dem	Kerry Szeps Wood	Dem Hold
30	Donna Veach	Rep	Donna Veach	Rep Hold
31	Jill Barry	Dem	Jill Barry	Dem Hold
32	Christie Carpino	Rep	Christie Carpino	Rep Hold
33	Brandon Chafee	Dem	Brandon Chafee	Dem Hold
34	Irene Haines	Rep	Irene Haines	Rep Hold
35	Chris Aniskovich	Rep	Chris Aniskovich	Rep Hold
36	Christine Palm	Dem	Renee LaMark Muir	Dem Hold
37	Holly Cheeseman	Rep	**Nick Menapace**	**Dem Gain**
38	Kathleen McCarty	Rep	**Nick Gauthier**	**Dem Gain**
39	Anthony Nolan	Dem	Anthony Nolan	Dem Hold
40	Christine Conley	Dem	Christine Conley	Dem Hold
41	Aundre Bumgardner	Dem	Aundre Bumgardner	Dem Hold
42	Keith Denning	Dem	Savet Constantine	Dem Hold
43	Greg Howard	Rep	Greg Howard	Rep Hold
44	Anne Dauphinais	Rep	Anne Dauphinais	Rep Hold
45	Brian Lanoue	Rep	Brian Lanoue	Rep Hold
46	Derell Wilson	Dem	Derell Wilson	Dem Hold
47	Doug Dubitsky	Rep	Doug Dubitsky	Rep Hold
48	Mark DeCaprio	Rep	Mark DeCaprio	Rep Hold
49	Susan Johnson	Dem	Susan Johnson	Dem Hold
50	Pat Boyd	Dem	Pat Boyd	Dem Hold
51	Rick Hayes	Rep	Chris Stewart	Rep Hold
52	Kurt Vail	Rep	Kurt Vail	Rep Hold
53	Tammy Nuccio	Rep	Tammy Nuccio	Rep Hold
54	Gregory Haddad	Dem	Gregory Haddad	Dem Hold
55	Steve Weir	Rep	Steve Weir	Rep Hold
56	Kevin Brown	Dem	Kevin Brown	Dem Hold
57	Jaime Foster	Dem	Jaime Foster	Dem Hold
58	Tom Arnone	Dem	John Santanella	Dem Hold
59	Carol Hall	Rep	Carol Hall	Rep Hold
60	Jane Garibay	Dem	Jane Garibay	Dem Hold
61	Tami Zawistowski	Rep	Tami Zawistowski	Rep Hold
62	Mark Anderson	Rep	Mark Anderson	Rep Hold
63	Jay Case	Rep	Jay Case	Rep Hold
64	Maria Horn	Dem	Maria Horn	Dem Hold
65	Michelle Cook	Dem	**Joe Canino**	**Rep Gain**
66	Karen Reddington-Hughes	Rep	Karen Reddington-Hughes	Rep Hold
67	Bill Buckbee	Rep	Bill Buckbee	Rep Hold
68	Joseph "Joe" Polletta	Rep	Joseph "Joe" Polletta	Rep Hold
69	Cindy Harrison	Rep	Jason Buchsbaum	Rep Hold
70	Seth Bronko	Rep	Seth Bronko	Rep Hold
71	William Pizzuto	Rep	William Pizzuto	Rep Hold
72	Larry Butler	Dem	Larry Butler	Dem Hold
73	Ronald Napoli Jr.	Dem	Ronald Napoli Jr.	Dem Hold
74	Michael DiGiovancarlo	Dem	Michael DiGiovancarlo	Dem Hold
75	Geraldo Reyes	Dem	Geraldo Reyes	Dem Hold
76	John Piscopo	Rep	John Piscopo	Rep Hold
77	Cara Pavalock-D'Amato	Rep	Cara Pavalock-D'Amato	Rep Hold
78	Joe Hoxha	Rep	Joe Hoxha	Rep Hold
79	Mary Fortier	Dem	Mary Fortier	Dem Hold
80	Gale Mastrofrancesco	Rep	Gale Mastrofrancesco	Rep Hold
81	Chris Poulos	Dem	Chris Poulos	Dem Hold
82	Michael Quinn	Dem	Michael Quinn	Dem Hold
83	Jack Fazzino	Dem	Jack Fazzino	Dem Hold
84	Hilda Santiago	Dem	Hilda Santiago	Dem Hold
85	Mary Mushinsky	Dem	Mary Mushinsky	Dem Hold
86	Vincent Candelora	Rep	Vincent Candelora	Rep Hold
87	Dave Yaccarino	Rep	Dave Yaccarino	Rep Hold
88	Josh Elliott	Dem	Josh Elliott	Dem Hold
89	Lezlye Zupkus	Rep	Lezlye Zupkus	Rep Hold
90	Craig C. Fishbein	Rep	Craig C. Fishbein	Rep Hold
91	Michael D'Agostino	Dem	Laurie Sweet	Dem Hold
92	Patricia Dillon	Dem	Patricia Dillon	Dem Hold
93	Toni Walker	Dem	Toni Walker	Dem Hold
94	Robyn Porter	Dem	Steven Winter	Dem Hold
95	Juan Candelaria	Dem	Juan Candelaria	Dem Hold
96	Roland Lemar	Dem	Roland Lemar	Dem Hold
97	Alphonse Paolillo	Dem	Alphonse Paolillo	Dem Hold
98	Moira Rader	Dem	Moira Rader	Dem Hold
99	Joseph "Joe" Zullo	Rep	Joseph "Joe" Zullo	Rep Hold
100	Kai Belton	Dem	Kai Belton	Dem Hold
101	John-Michael Parker	Dem	John-Michael Parker	Dem Hold
102	Robin Comey	Dem	Robin Comey	Dem Hold
103	Liz Linehan	Dem	Liz Linehan	Dem Hold
104	Kara Rochelle	Dem	Kara Rochelle	Dem Hold
105	Nicole Klarides-Ditria	Rep	Nicole Klarides-Ditria	Rep Hold
106	Mitch Bolinsky	Rep	Mitch Bolinsky	Rep Hold
107	Martin Foncello	Rep	Martin Foncello	Rep Hold
108	Patrick Callahan	Rep	Patrick Callahan	Rep Hold
109	Farley Santos	Dem	Farley Santos	Dem Hold
110	Bob Godfrey	Dem	Bob Godfrey	Dem Hold
111	Aimee Berger-Girvalo	Dem	Aimee Berger-Girvalo	Dem Hold
112	Tony Scott	Rep	Tony Scott	Rep Hold
113	Jason Perillo	Rep	Jason Perillo	Rep Hold
114	Mary Welander	Dem	Mary Welander	Dem Hold
115	William J. "Bill" Heffernan III	Dem	William J. "Bill" Heffernan III	Dem Hold
116	Treneé McGee	Dem	Treneé McGee	Dem Hold
117	Charles Ferraro	Rep	**MJ Shannon**	**Dem Gain**
118	Frank Smith	Dem	Frank Smith	Dem Hold
119	Kathy Kennedy	Rep	Kathy Kennedy	Rep Hold
120	Laura Dancho	Rep	**Kaitlyn Shake**	**Dem Gain**
121	Joseph P. "Joe" Gresko	Dem	Joseph P. "Joe" Gresko	Dem Hold
122	Ben McGorty	Rep	Ben McGorty	Rep Hold
123	David Rutigliano	Rep	David Rutigliano	Rep Hold
124	Andre Baker	Dem	Andre Baker	Dem Hold
125	Tom O'Dea	Rep	Tom O'Dea	Rep Hold
126	Fred Gee	Dem	Fred Gee	Dem Hold
127	Marcus Brown	Dem	Marcus Brown	Dem Hold
128	Christopher Rosario	Dem	Christopher Rosario	Dem Hold
129	Steven Stafstrom	Dem	Steven Stafstrom	Dem Hold
130	Antonio Felipe	Dem	Antonio Felipe	Dem Hold
131	David Labriola	Rep	Arnold Jensen	Rep Hold
132	Jennifer Leeper	Dem	Jennifer Leeper	Dem Hold
133	Cristin McCarthy Vahey	Dem	Cristin McCarthy Vahey	Dem Hold
134	Sarah Keitt	Dem	Sarah Keitt	Dem Hold
135	Anne Hughes	Dem	Anne Hughes	Dem Hold
136	Jonathan Steinberg	Dem	Jonathan Steinberg	Dem Hold
137	Kadeem Roberts	Dem	Kadeem Roberts	Dem Hold
138	Rachel Chaleski	Rep	**Kenneth M. "Ken" Gucker**	**Dem Gain**
139	Kevin Ryan	Dem	Kevin Ryan	Dem Hold
140	Travis Simms	Dem	Travis Simms	Dem Hold
141	Tracy Marra	Rep	Tracy Marra	Rep Hold
142	Lucy Dathan	Dem	Lucy Dathan	Dem Hold
143	Dominique Johnson	Dem	Dominique Johnson	Dem Hold
144	Hubert Delany	Dem	Hubert Delany	Dem Hold
145	Corey Paris	Dem	Corey Paris	Dem Hold
146	David Michel	Dem	Eilish Collins Main	Dem Hold
147	Matt Blumenthal	Dem	Matt Blumenthal	Dem Hold
148	Anabel Figueroa	Dem	Jonathan Jacobson	Dem Hold
149	Rachel Khanna	Dem	**Tina Courpas**	**Rep Gain**
150	Steve Meskers	Dem	Steve Meskers	Dem Hold
151	Hector Arzeno	Dem	Hector Arzeno	Dem Hold

== Election results ==
=== District 1 ===
Connecticut's 1st House of Representatives district election, 2024
Party	Candidate	Votes	%
Democratic	Matthew Ritter (incumbent)	4,961	100%
Total votes		4,961	100%

=== District 2 ===
Connecticut's 2nd House of Representatives district election, 2024
Party	Candidate	Votes	%
Democratic	Raghib Allie-Brennan	7,007	55.4%
Independent Party	Raghib Allie-Brennan	323	2.6%
Total	Raghib Allie-Brennan (incumbent)	7,330	58.0%
Republican	Bradley Koltz	5,310	42.0%
Total votes		12,640	100%

=== District 3 ===
Connecticut's 3rd House of Representatives district election, 2024
Party	Candidate	Votes	%
Democratic	Minnie Gonzalez (incumbent)	3,354	100%
Total votes		3,354	100%

=== District 4 ===
Connecticut's 4th House of Representatives district election, 2024
Party	Candidate	Votes	%
Democratic	Julio Concepcion (incumbent)	3,519	100%
Total votes		3,519	100%

=== District 5 ===
Connecticut's 5th House of Representatives district election, 2024
Party	Candidate	Votes	%
Democratic	Maryam Khan (incumbent)	8,166	99.8%
Write-In	Tracy L. Funnye	12	0.2%
Total votes		8,178	100%

=== District 6 ===
Connecticut's 6th House of Representatives district election, 2024
Party	Candidate	Votes	%
Democratic	James Sánchez (incumbent)	4,385	93.5%
Independent	Alyssa Peterson	304	6.5%
Total votes		4,689	100%

=== District 7 ===
Connecticut's 7th House of Representatives district election, 2024
Party	Candidate	Votes	%
Democratic	Joshua M. Hall (incumbent)	4,889	100%
Total votes		4,889	100%

=== District 8 ===
Connecticut's 8th House of Representatives district election, 2024
Party	Candidate	Votes	%
Republican	Tim Ackert (incumbent)	8,580	59.2%
Democratic	Nancy Hammarstrom	5,657	39.0%
Working Families	Nancy Hammarstrom	263	1.8%
Total	Nancy Hammarstrom	5,920	40.8%
Total votes		14,500	100%

=== District 9 ===
Connecticut's 9th House of Representatives district election, 2024
Party	Candidate	Votes	%
Democratic	Jason Rojas (incumbent)	7,419	100%
Total votes		7,419	100%

=== District 10 ===
Connecticut's 10th House of Representatives district election, 2024
Party	Candidate	Votes	%
Democratic	Henry Genga (incumbent)	5,470	68.8%
Republican	Christopher Tierinni	2,484	31.2%
Total votes		7,954	100%

=== District 11 ===
Connecticut's 11th House of Representatives district election, 2024
Party	Candidate	Votes	%
Democratic	Patrick Biggins	4,969	69.4%
Republican	Salema Davis	2,194	30.6%
Total votes		7,163	100%

=== District 12 ===
Connecticut's 12th House of Representatives district election, 2024
Party	Candidate	Votes	%
Democratic	Geoff Luxenberg	6,361	62.6%
Working Families	Geoff Luxenberg	359	3.5%
Total	Geoff Luxenberg (incumbent)	6,720	66.1%
Republican	Robert Cormier	3,398	33.4%
Independent	Joseph Young	52	0.5%
Total votes		10,170	100%

=== District 13 ===
Connecticut's 13th House of Representatives district election, 2024
Party	Candidate	Votes	%
Democratic	Jason Doucette	7,518	63.6%
Independent Party	Jason Doucette	328	2.8%
Total	Jason Doucette (incumbent)	7,846	66.4%
Republican	Donna C. Meier	3,969	33.6%
Total votes		11,815	100%

=== District 14 ===
Connecticut's 14th House of Representatives district election, 2024
Party	Candidate	Votes	%
Republican	Tom Delnicki	6,773	52.2%
Independent Party	Tom Delnicki	304	2.3%
Total	Tom Delnicki (incumbent)	7,077	54.5%
Democratic	Steven King	5,536	42.7%
United Community	Marek Kozikowski	358	2.8%
Total votes		12,971	100%

=== District 15 ===
Democratic primary: Connecticut's 15th House of Representatives election, 2024
Party	Candidate	Votes	%
Democratic	Bobby Gibson (Incumbent)	1,860	70.1%
Democratic	Jennifer A. Marshall-Nealy	793	29.9%
Total votes		2,653	100%

Connecticut's 15th House of Representatives district election, 2024
Party	Candidate	Votes	%
Democratic	Bobby Gibson (Incumbent)	10,379	83.6%
Republican	Quentin Johnson	2,034	16.4%
Total votes		12,413	100%

=== District 16 ===
Connecticut's 16th House of Representatives district election, 2024
Party	Candidate	Votes	%
Democratic	Melissa Osborne (incumbent)	9,721	61.8%
Republican	Michael Schulitz	5,997	38.2%
Total votes		15,718	100%

=== District 17 ===
Connecticut's 17th House of Representatives district election, 2024
Party	Candidate	Votes	%
Democratic	Eleni Kavros DeGraw	8,681	59.1%
Working Families	Eleni Kavros DeGraw	275	1.9%
Independent Party	Eleni Kavros DeGraw	212	1.4%
Total	Eleni Kavros DeGraw (incumbent)	9,168	62.4%
Republican	Manju Gerber	5,522	37.6%
Total votes		14,690	100%

=== District 18 ===
Connecticut's 18th House of Representatives district election, 2024
Party	Candidate	Votes	%
Democratic	Jillian Gilchrest (incumbent)	10,113	100%
Total votes		10,113	100%

=== District 19 ===
Connecticut's 19th House of Representatives district election, 2024
Party	Candidate	Votes	%
Democratic	Tammy Exum (incumbent)	11,481	100%
Total votes		11,481	100%

=== District 20 ===
Connecticut's 20th House of Representatives district election, 2024
Party	Candidate	Votes	%
Democratic	Kate Farrar	8,391	87.8%
Working Families	Kate Farrar	1,171	12.2%
Total	Kate Farrar (incumbent)	9,562	100.0%
Total votes		9,562	100%

=== District 21 ===
Connecticut's 21st House of Representatives district election, 2024
Party	Candidate	Votes	%
Democratic	Mike Demicco	8,392	61.1%
Working Families	Mike Demicco	313	2.3%
Independent Party	Mike Demicco	192	1.4%
Total	Mike Demicco (incumbent)	8,897	64.8%
Republican	Johnny Carrier	4,834	35.2%
Total votes		13,731	100%

=== District 22 ===
Connecticut's 22nd House of Representatives district election, 2024
Party	Candidate	Votes	%
Democratic	Rebecca Martinez	5,984	47.3%
Working Families	Rebecca Martinez	363	2.9%
Independent Party	Rebecca Martinez	204	1.6%
Total	Rebecca Martinez	6,551	51.7%
Republican	Francis Cooley (incumbent)	6,108	48.3%
Total votes		12,659	100%

=== District 23 ===
Connecticut's 23rd House of Representatives district election, 2024
Party	Candidate	Votes	%
Republican	Devin Carney	7,758	49.7%
Independent Party	Devin Carney	286	1.8%
Total	Devin Carney (incumbent)	8,044	51.5%
Democratic	Jane Wisialowski	7,369	47.2%
Working Families	Jane Wisialowski	213	1.4%
Total	Jane Wisialowski	7,582	48.5%
Total votes		15,616	100%

=== District 24 ===
Connecticut's 24th House of Representatives district election, 2024
Party	Candidate	Votes	%
Democratic	Manny Sanchez	4,700	60.9%
Working Families	Manny Sanchez	362	4.7%
Total	Manny Sanchez (incumbent)	5,062	65.6%
Republican	Alden Russell	2,631	34.1%
Independent	Alfred Mayo	27	0.3%
Total votes		7,720	100%

=== District 25 ===
Connecticut's 25th House of Representatives district election, 2024
Party	Candidate	Votes	%
Democratic	Bobby Sanchez (incumbent)	3,614	70.1%
Republican	Jamie Vaughan	1,543	29.9%
Total votes		5,157	100%

=== District 26 ===
Democratic primary
Party	Candidate	Votes	%
Democratic	David DeFronzo	484	66.1%
Democratic	Aram Ayalon	248	33.9%
Total votes		732	100.00%

Connecticut's 26th House of Representatives district election, 2024
Party	Candidate	Votes	%
Democratic	David DeFronzo	4,042	55.8%
Working Families	David DeFronzo	294	4.1%
Total	David DeFronzo	4,336	59.8%
Republican	Barbara Marino	2,910	40.2%
Total votes		7,246	100%

=== District 27 ===
Connecticut's 27th House of Representatives district election, 2024
Party	Candidate	Votes	%
Democratic	Gary Turco	7,381	76.9%
Working Families	Gary Turco	1,106	11.5%
Total	Gary Turco (incumbent)	8,487	88.4%
Independent	Stephen Ellis	1,109	11.6%
Total votes		9,596	100%

=== District 28 ===
Connecticut's 28th House of Representatives district election, 2024
Party	Candidate	Votes	%
Democratic	Amy Morrin Bello	7,557	55.9%
Working Families	Amy Morrin Bello	473	3.5%
Total	Amy Morrin Bello (incumbent)	8,030	59.4%
Republican	Bill Davidson	5,480	40.6%
Total votes		13,510	100%

=== District 29 ===
Connecticut's 29th House of Representatives district election, 2024
Party	Candidate	Votes	%
Democratic	Kerry Szeps Wood (incumbent)	6,729	57.6%
Republican	Edward Charamut	4,950	42.4%
Total votes		11,679	100%

=== District 30 ===
Connecticut's 30th House of Representatives district election, 2024
Party	Candidate	Votes	%
Republican	Donna Veach (incumbent)	9,344	100%
Total votes		9,344	100%

=== District 31 ===
Republican Kevin Nursick did not make the ballot

Connecticut's 31st House of Representatives district election, 2024
Party	Candidate	Votes	%
Democratic	Jill Barry	9,367	88.6%
Independent Party	Jill Barry	1,209	11.4%
Total	Jill Barry (incumbent)	10,576	100.0%
Total votes		10,576	100%

=== District 32 ===
Connecticut's 32nd House of Representatives district election, 2024
Party	Candidate	Votes	%
Republican	Christie Carpino (incumbent)	10,215	100%
Total votes		10,215	100%

=== District 33 ===
Connecticut's 33rd House of Representatives district election, 2024
Party	Candidate	Votes	%
Democratic	Brandon Chafee	6,510	75.9%
Independent Party	Brandon Chafee	1,080	12.6%
Total	Brandon Chafee (incumbent)	7,590	88.5%
We the People	Robert Hoggard	698	8.1%
Independent	Christine Rebstock	292	3.2%
Total votes		8,580	100%

=== District 34 ===
Connecticut's 34th House of Representatives district election, 2024
Party	Candidate	Votes	%
Republican	Irene Haines (incumbent)	7,730	53.1%
Democratic	Richard Knotek	6,530	44.9%
Independent	David Cassenti	296	2.0%
Total votes		14,556	100%

=== District 35 ===
Connecticut's 35th House of Representatives district election, 2024
Party	Candidate	Votes	%
Republican	Chris Aniskovich	7,019	48.9%
Independent Party	Chris Aniskovich	233	1.6%
Total	Chris Aniskovich (incumbent)	7,252	50.5%
Democratic	Cinzia Lettieri	6,848	47.7%
Working Families	Cinzia Lettieri	254	1.8%
Total	Cinzia Lettieri	7,102	49.5%
Total votes		14,354	100%

2024 election results by town, CT House District 35

=== District 36 ===
Connecticut's 36th House of Representatives district election, 2024
Party	Candidate	Votes	%
Democratic	Renee Muir	8,022	53.0%
Republican	Kathryn Russell	7,114	47.0%
Total votes		15,136	100%

=== District 37 ===
Connecticut's 37th House of Representatives district election, 2024
Party	Candidate	Votes	%
Democratic	Nick Menapace	7,405	48.2%
Working Families	Nick Menapace	330	2.2%
Total	Nick Menapace	7,735	50.3%
Republican	Holly Cheeseman	7,302	47.5%
Independent Party	Holly Cheeseman	334	2.2%
Total	Holly Cheeseman (incumbent)	7,636	49.7%
Total votes		15,371	100%

=== District 38 ===
Connecticut's 38th House of Representatives district election, 2024
Party	Candidate	Votes	%
Democratic	Nick Gauthier	6,745	46.9%
Working Families	Nick Gauthier	320	2.2%
Independent Party	Nick Gauthier	209	1.5%
Total	Nick Gauthier	7,274	50.6%
Republican	Kathleen McCarty (incumbent)	7,100	49.4%
Total votes		14,374	100%

=== District 39 ===
Connecticut's 39th House of Representatives district election, 2024
Party	Candidate	Votes	%
Democratic	Anthony Nolan	4,803	73.0%
Working Families	Anthony Nolan	502	7.6%
Total	Anthony Nolan (incumbent)	5,305	80.6%
Republican	Beloved Grace-Carter	1,273	19.4%
Total votes		6,578	100%

=== District 40 ===
Connecticut's 40th House of Representatives district election, 2024
Party	Candidate	Votes	%
Democratic	Christine Conley	5,682	60.7%
Working Families	Christine Conley	284	3.0%
Independent Party	Christine Conley	229	2.5%
Total	Christine Conley (incumbent)	6,195	66.2%
Republican	Susan Shrinbot	3,167	33.8%
Total votes		9,362	100%

=== District 41 ===
Connecticut's 41st House of Representatives district election, 2024
Party	Candidate	Votes	%
Democratic	Aundre Bumgardner	8,855	80.6%
Working Families	Aundre Bumgardner	1,368	12.5%
Independent Party	Aundre Bumgardner	762	6.9%
Total	Aundre Bumgardner (incumbent)	10,985	100.0%
Total votes		10,985	100%

=== District 42 ===
Connecticut's 42nd House of Representatives district election, 2024
Party	Candidate	Votes	%
Democratic	Savet Constantine	7,026	50.9%
Republican	Kim Healy	6,480	47.0%
Independent Party	Kim Healy	295	2.1%
Total	Kim Healy	6,775	49.1%
Total votes		13,801	100%

=== District 43 ===
Connecticut's 43rd House of Representatives district election, 2024
Party	Candidate	Votes	%
Republican	Greg Howard (incumbent)	7,805	57.9%
Democratic	Ty Lamb	5,679	42.1%
Total votes		13,484	100%

=== District 44 ===
Connecticut's 44th House of Representatives district election, 2024
Party	Candidate	Votes	%
Republican	Anne Dauphinais (incumbent)	6,982	63.3%
Democratic	Samantha Derenthal	3,746	34.0%
Independent Party	Samantha Derenthal	295	2.7%
Total	Samantha Derenthal	4,041	36.7%
Total votes		11,023	100%

=== District 45 ===
Connecticut's 45th House of Representatives district election, 2024
Party	Candidate	Votes	%
Republican	Brian Lanoue (incumbent)	8,267	62.8%
Democratic	Kayla Thompson	4,899	37.2%
Total votes		13,166	100%

=== District 46 ===
Connecticut's 46th House of Representatives district election, 2024
Party	Candidate	Votes	%
Democratic	Derell Wilson	4,468	60.9%
Working Families	Derell Wilson (incumbent)	365	5.0%
Total	Derell Wilson	4,833	65.8%
Republican	Nicholas Casiano	2,509	34.2%
Total votes		7,342	100%

=== District 47 ===
Connecticut's 47th House of Representatives district election, 2024
Party	Candidate	Votes	%
Republican	Doug Dubitsky (incumbent)	8,173	62.7%
Democratic	David Spruance	4,872	37.3%
Total votes		13,045	100%

=== District 48 ===
Connecticut's 48th House of Representatives district election, 2024
Party	Candidate	Votes	%
Republican	Mark DeCaprio (incumbent)	7,506	51.1%
Democratic	Christopher Rivers	6,714	45.7%
Working Families	Christopher Rivers	304	2.1%
Total	Christopher Rivers	7,018	47.7%
Independent Party	Lance Lusigan	175	1.2%
Total votes		14,699	100%

=== District 49 ===
Connecticut's 49th House of Representatives district election, 2024
Party	Candidate	Votes	%
Democratic	Susan Johnson	4,628	84.6%
Working Families	Susan Johnson	843	15.4%
Total	Susan Johnson (incumbent)	5,471	100.0%
Total votes		5,471	100%

=== District 50 ===
Connecticut's 50th House of Representatives district election, 2024
Party	Candidate	Votes	%
Democratic	Pat Boyd (incumbent)	9,136	100%
Total votes		9,136	100%

=== District 51 ===
Connecticut's 51st House of Representatives district election, 2024
Party	Candidate	Votes	%
Republican	Chris Stewart	6,519	54.5%
Democratic	Renee LaPalme-Waldron	4,834	40.4%
Working Families	Renee LaPalme-Waldron	338	2.8%
Independent Party	Renee LaPalme-Waldron	262	2.2%
Total	Renee LaPalme-Waldron	5,434	45.5%
Total votes		11,953	100%

=== District 52 ===
Connecticut's 52nd House of Representatives district election, 2024
Party	Candidate	Votes	%
Republican	Kurt Vail (incumbent)	8,421	57.6%
Democratic	Ethan Werstler	6,202	42.4%
Total votes		14,623	100%

=== District 53 ===
Connecticut's 53rd House of Representatives district election, 2024
Party	Candidate	Votes	%
Republican	Tammy Nuccio	7,761	54.8%
Independent Party	Tammy Nuccio	275	1.9%
Total	Tammy Nuccio (incumbent)	8,036	56.8%
Democratic	Ann Bonney	5,875	41.5%
Working Families	Ann Bonney	243	1.7%
Total	Ann Bonney	6,118	43.2%
Total votes		14,154	100%

=== District 54 ===
Connecticut's 54th House of Representatives district election, 2024
Party	Candidate	Votes	%
Democratic	Gregory Haddad (incumbent)	2,505	82.6%
Republican	Aaron Bowman	526	17.4%
Total votes		3,031	100%

=== District 55 ===
Connecticut's 55th House of Representatives district election, 2024
Party	Candidate	Votes	%
Republican	Steve Weir (incumbent)	8,260	53.9%
Democratic	Amanda Veneziano	7,067	46.1%
Total votes		15,327	100%

=== District 56 ===
Connecticut's 56th House of Representatives district election, 2024
Party	Candidate	Votes	%
Democratic	Kevin Brown (incumbent)	6,265	60.5%
Republican	Brian Motola	4,096	39.5%
Total votes		10,361	100%

=== District 57 ===
Connecticut's 57th House of Representatives district election, 2024
Party	Candidate	Votes	%
Democratic	Jaime Foster (incumbent)	6,996	58.2%
Republican	Jennifer Dzen	5,021	41.8%
Total votes		12,017	100%

=== District 58 ===
Democratic primary
Party	Candidate	Votes	%
Democratic	John Santanella	704	76.69%
Democratic	David J. Alexander	214	23.31%
Total votes		918	100.00%

Connecticut's 58th House of Representatives district election, 2024
Party	Candidate	Votes	%
Democratic	John Santanella	5,506	58.4%
Republican	Robert Hendrickson	3,916	41.6%
Total votes		9,422	100%

=== District 59 ===
Connecticut's 59th House of Representatives district election, 2024
Party	Candidate	Votes	%
Republican	Carol Hall (incumbent)	6,199	50.7%
Democratic	Richard LeBorious	6,021	49.3%
Total votes		12,220	100%

=== District 60 ===
Connecticut's 60th House of Representatives district election, 2024
Party	Candidate	Votes	%
Democratic	Jane Garibay (incumbent)	7,249	64.5%
Republican	Lenworth Walker	3,985	35.5%
Total votes		11,234	100%

=== District 61 ===
Connecticut's 61st House of Representatives district election, 2024
Party	Candidate	Votes	%
Republican	Tami Zawistowski (incumbent)	8,128	59.4%
Democratic	Michael Malloy	5,553	40.6%
Total votes		13,681	100%

=== District 62 ===
Connecticut's 62nd House of Representatives district election, 2024
Party	Candidate	Votes	%
Republican	Mark Anderson (incumbent)	8,175	53.7%
Democratic	Kimberly Becker	7,035	46.3%
Total votes		15,210	100%

=== District 63 ===
Connecticut's 63rd House of Representatives district election, 2024
Party	Candidate	Votes	%
Republican	Jay Case (incumbent)	4,668	100%
Total votes		4,668	100%

=== District 64 ===
Connecticut's 64th House of Representatives district election, 2024
Party	Candidate	Votes	%
Democratic	Maria Horn (incumbent)	8,923	64.8%
Republican	Barbara Breor	4,853	35.2%
Total votes		13,776	100%

=== District 65 ===
Connecticut's 65th House of Representatives district election, 2024
Party	Candidate	Votes	%
Republican	Joseph Canino	4,686	50.3%
Democratic	Michelle Cook (incumbent)	4,632	49.7%
Total votes		9,318	100%

=== District 66 ===
Connecticut's 66th House of Representatives district election, 2024
Party	Candidate	Votes	%
Republican	Karen Hughes (incumbent)	8,522	56.1%
Democratic	Sharon Botelle-Sherman	6,673	43.9%
Total votes		15,195	100%

=== District 67 ===
Connecticut's 67th House of Representatives district election, 2024
Party	Candidate	Votes	%
Republican	Bill Buckbee (incumbent)	7,317	63.2%
Democratic	Alexandra Thomas	4,260	36.8%
Total votes		11,577	100%

=== District 68 ===
Connecticut's 68th House of Representatives district election, 2024
Party	Candidate	Votes	%
Republican	Joseph Polletta (incumbent)	9,905	100%
Total votes		9,905	100%

=== District 69 ===
Connecticut's 69th House of Representatives district election, 2024
Party	Candidate	Votes	%
Republican	Jason Buchsbaum	7,901	54.1%
Democratic	Edward Edelson	6,706	45.9%
Total votes		14,607	100%

=== District 70 ===
Connecticut's 70th House of Representatives district election, 2024
Party	Candidate	Votes	%
Republican	Seth Bronko (incumbent)	5,618	55.1%
Democratic	Jeffrey Litke	4,585	44.9%
Total votes		10,203	100%

=== District 71 ===
Connecticut's 71st House of Representatives district election, 2024
Party	Candidate	Votes	%
Republican	William Pizzuto (incumbent)	6,936	100%
Total votes		6,936	100%

=== District 72 ===
Connecticut's 72nd House of Representatives district election, 2024
Party	Candidate	Votes	%
Democratic	Larry Butler (incumbent)	3,886	100%
Total votes		3,886	100%

=== District 73 ===
Connecticut's 73rd House of Representatives district election, 2024
Party	Candidate	Votes	%
Democratic	Ronald Napoli Jr. (incumbent)	4,867	66.5%
Republican	Abigail Diaz Pizarro	2,448	33.5%
Total votes		7,315	100%

=== District 74 ===
Connecticut's 74th House of Representatives district election, 2024
Party	Candidate	Votes	%
Democratic	Michael DiGiovancarlo (incumbent)	4,817	100%
Total votes		4,817	100%

=== District 75 ===
Connecticut's 75th House of Representatives district election, 2024
Party	Candidate	Votes	%
Democratic	Geraldo Reyes (incumbent)	2,848	100%
Total votes		2,848	100%

=== District 76 ===
Connecticut's 76th House of Representatives district election, 2024
Party	Candidate	Votes	%
Republican	John Piscopo (incumbent)	9,149	67.9%
Democratic	Stephen Simonin	4,318	32.1%
Total votes		13,467	100%

=== District 77 ===
Connecticut's 77th House of Representatives district election, 2024
Party	Candidate	Votes	%
Republican	Cara D'Amato (incumbent)	6,655	69.2%
Independent Party	Mary Rydingsward	2,958	30.8%
Total votes		9,613	100%

=== District 78 ===
Connecticut's 78th House of Representatives district election, 2024
Party	Candidate	Votes	%
Republican	Joe Hoxha (incumbent)	8,443	100%
Total votes		8,443	100%

=== District 79 ===
Connecticut's 79th House of Representatives district election, 2024
Party	Candidate	Votes	%
Democratic	Mary Fortier (incumbent)	5,511	57.7%
Republican	David Schrager	4,046	42.3%
Total votes		9,557	100%

=== District 80 ===
Connecticut's 80th House of Representatives district election, 2024
Party	Candidate	Votes	%
Republican	Gale Mastrofrancesco (incumbent)	10,251	100%
Total votes		10,251	100%

=== District 81 ===
Incumbent Democrat representative Chris Poulos, who won by only one vote in 2022, is running for re-election.

Connecticut's 81st House of Representatives district election, 2024
Party	Candidate	Votes	%
Democratic	Chris Poulos (incumbent)	7,133	55.1%
Republican	James Morelli	5,802	44.9%
Total votes		12,935	100%

=== District 82 ===
Connecticut's 82nd House of Representatives district election, 2024
Party	Candidate	Votes	%
Democratic	Michael Quinn (incumbent)	6,002	61.2%
Republican	Lamar Terrell	3,801	38.8%
Total votes		9,803	100%

=== District 83 ===
Connecticut's 83rd House of Representatives district election, 2024
Party	Candidate	Votes	%
Democratic	Jack Fazzino (incumbent)	6,892	54.7%
Republican	Joseph Vollano	5,703	45.3%
Total votes		12,595	100%

=== District 84 ===
Connecticut's 84th House of Representatives district election, 2024
Party	Candidate	Votes	%
Democratic	Hilda Santiago (incumbent)	4,074	100%
Total votes		4,074	100%

=== District 85 ===
Connecticut's 85th House of Representatives district election, 2024
Party	Candidate	Votes	%
Democratic	Mary Mushinsky (incumbent)	8,168	56.2%
Republican	Jerry Farrell	6,358	43.8%
Total votes		14,526	100%

=== District 86 ===
Connecticut's 86th House of Representatives district election, 2024
Party	Candidate	Votes	%
Republican	Vincent Candelora (incumbent)	10,043	100%
Total votes		10,043	100%

=== District 87 ===
Connecticut's 87th House of Representatives district election, 2024
Party	Candidate	Votes	%
Republican	Dave Yaccarino (incumbent)	6,385	75.8%
Democratic	Kieran Ahern	2,037	24.2%
Total votes		8,422	100%

=== District 88 ===
Connecticut's 88th House of Representatives district election, 2024
Party	Candidate	Votes	%
Democratic	Josh Elliott (incumbent)	2,788	100%
Total votes		2,788	100%

=== District 89 ===
Connecticut's 89th House of Representatives district election, 2024
Party	Candidate	Votes	%
Republican	Lezlye Zupkus (incumbent)	10,263	100%
Total votes		10,263	100%

=== District 90 ===
Connecticut's 90th House of Representatives district election, 2024
Party	Candidate	Votes	%
Republican	Craig Fishbein (incumbent)	8,581	54%
Democratic	Rebecca Hyland	7,316	46%
Total votes		15,897	100%

=== District 91 ===
Democratic primary
Party	Candidate	Votes	%
Democratic	Laurie Sweet	947	50.40%
Democratic	Jennifer Pope	932	49.60%
Total votes		1,879	100.00%

Connecticut's 91st House of Representatives district election, 2024
Party	Candidate	Votes	%
Democratic	Laurie Sweet	4,032	100%
Total votes		4,032	100%

=== District 92 ===
Connecticut's 92nd House of Representatives district election, 2024
Party	Candidate	Votes	%
Democratic	Patricia Dillon (incumbent)	3,725	86.8%
Republican	Morris Sumpter	565	13.2%
Total votes		4,290	100%

=== District 93 ===
Connecticut's 93rd House of Representatives district election, 2024
Party	Candidate	Votes	%
Democratic	Toni Walker (incumbent)	4,760	100%
Total votes		4,760	100%

=== District 94 ===
Democratic primary
Party	Candidate	Votes	%
Democratic	Steven B. Winter	738	60.94%
Democratic	Abdul Osmanu	388	32.04%
Democratic	Tarolyn Moore	85	7.02%
Total votes		1,211	100.00%

Connecticut's 94th House of Representatives district election, 2024
Party	Candidate	Votes	%
Democratic	Steven B. Winter	4,658	100%
Total votes		4,658	100%

=== District 95 ===
Connecticut's 95th House of Representatives district election, 2024
Party	Candidate	Votes	%
Democratic	Juan Candelaria (incumbent)	3,454	100%
Total votes		3,454	100%

=== District 96 ===
Connecticut's 96th House of Representatives district election, 2024
Party	Candidate	Votes	%
Democratic	Roland Lemar (incumbent)	1,927	90.9%
Republican	Andrea Zola	192	9.1%
Total votes		2,119	100%

=== District 97 ===
Connecticut's 97th House of Representatives district election, 2024
Party	Candidate	Votes	%
Democratic	Alphonse Paolillo (incumbent)	2,458	71.2%
Republican	Anthony Acri	996	28.8%
Total votes		3,454	100%

=== District 98 ===
Connecticut's 98th House of Representatives district election, 2024
Party	Candidate	Votes	%
Democratic	Moira Rader (incumbent)	8,573	64.1%
Republican	Richard DiNardo	4,809	35.9%
Total votes		13,382	100%

=== District 99 ===
Connecticut's 99th House of Representatives district election, 2024
Party	Candidate	Votes	%
Republican	Joseph Zullo (incumbent)	7,834	100%
Total votes		7,834	100%

=== District 100 ===
Connecticut's 100th House of Representatives district election, 2024
Party	Candidate	Votes	%
Democratic	Kai Belton (incumbent)	6,885	63.5%
Republican	Nigel Macon-Wilson	3,949	36.5%
Total votes		10,834	100%

=== District 101 ===
Connecticut's 101st House of Representatives district election, 2024
Party	Candidate	Votes	%
Democratic	John-Michael Parker (incumbent)	8,711	58.1%
Republican	Lisa Deane	6,290	41.9%
Total votes		15,001	100%

=== District 102 ===
Connecticut's 102nd House of Representatives district election, 2024
Party	Candidate	Votes	%
Democratic	Robin Comey (incumbent)	7,265	53.7%
Republican	Ray Ingraham	6,259	46.3%
Total votes		13,524	100%

=== District 103 ===
Connecticut's 103rd House of Representatives district election, 2024
Party	Candidate	Votes	%
Democratic	Liz Linehan (incumbent)	8,912	100%
Total votes		8,912	100%

=== District 104 ===
Connecticut's 104th House of Representatives district election, 2024
Party	Candidate	Votes	%
Democratic	Kara Rochelle (incumbent)	5,042	54%
Republican	David Cassetti	4,176	44.7%
Independent Party	Thomas Egan	118	1.3%
Total votes		9,336	100%

=== District 105 ===
Connecticut's 105th House of Representatives district election, 2024
Party	Candidate	Votes	%
Republican	Nicole Klarides-Ditria (incumbent)	9,476	100%
Total votes		9,476	100%

=== District 106 ===
Connecticut's 106th House of Representatives district election, 2024
Party	Candidate	Votes	%
Republican	Mitch Bolinsky (incumbent)	8,106	51.8%
Democratic	Michelle Embree Ku	7,541	48.2%
Total votes		15,647	100%

=== District 107 ===
Connecticut's 107th House of Representatives district election, 2024
Party	Candidate	Votes	%
Republican	Martin Foncello (incumbent)	7,482	52.6%
Democratic	Aaron Zimmer	6,751	47.4%
Total votes		14,233	100%

=== District 108 ===
Connecticut's 108th House of Representatives district election, 2024
Party	Candidate	Votes	%
Republican	Patrick Callahan (incumbent)	6,782	58.5%
Democratic	Anne Weisberg	4,808	41.5%
Total votes		11,590	100%

=== District 109 ===
Connecticut's 109th House of Representatives district election, 2024
Party	Candidate	Votes	%
Democratic	Farley Santos (incumbent)	4,510	55.9%
Republican	Brenda Santopolo Hefferon	3,554	44.1%
Total votes		8,064	100%

=== District 110 ===
Connecticut's 110th House of Representatives district election, 2024
Party	Candidate	Votes	%
Democratic	Bob Godfrey (incumbent)	3,159	60.4%
Republican	Austin Monteiro	2,071	39.6%
Total votes		5,230	100%

=== District 111 ===
Connecticut's 111th House of Representatives district election, 2024
Party	Candidate	Votes	%
Democratic	Aimee Berger-Girvalo (incumbent)	8,397	59.8%
Republican	Colette Kabasakalian	5,647	40.2%
Total votes		14,044	100%

=== District 112 ===
Connecticut's 112th House of Representatives district election, 2024
Party	Candidate	Votes	%
Republican	Tony Scott (incumbent)	7,355	57%
Democratic	Elizabeth Cliff	5,541	43%
Total votes		12,896	100%

=== District 113 ===
Connecticut's 113th House of Representatives district election, 2024
Party	Candidate	Votes	%
Republican	Jason Perillo (incumbent)	9,346	100%
Total votes		9,346	100%

=== District 114 ===
Connecticut's 114th House of Representatives district election, 2024
Party	Candidate	Votes	%
Democratic	Mary Welander (incumbent)	8,737	100%
Total votes		8,737	100%

=== District 115 ===
Connecticut's 115th House of Representatives district election, 2024
Party	Candidate	Votes	%
Democratic	William Heffernan III (incumbent)	14,044	100%
Total votes		14,044	100%

=== District 116 ===
Connecticut's 116th House of Representatives district election, 2024
Party	Candidate	Votes	%
Democratic	Treneé McGee (incumbent)	4,521	100%
Total votes		4,521	100%

=== District 117 ===
Connecticut's 117th House of Representatives district election, 2024
Party	Candidate	Votes	%
Democratic	MJ Shannon	7,120	52%
Republican	Raymond Collins	6,584	48%
Total votes		13,704	100%

=== District 118 ===
Connecticut's 118th House of Representatives district election, 2024
Party	Candidate	Votes	%
Democratic	Frank Smith (incumbent)	6,827	55.7%
Republican	Mark Macchio	5,438	44.3%
Total votes		12,265	100%

=== District 119 ===
Connecticut's 119th House of Representatives district election, 2024
Party	Candidate	Votes	%
Republican	Kathy Kennedy (incumbent)	7,575	58.2%
Democratic	Etan Hirsch	5,431	41.8%
Total votes		13,006	100%

=== District 120 ===
Connecticut's 120th House of Representatives district election, 2024
Party	Candidate	Votes	%
Democratic	Kaitlyn Shake	6,926	54.1%
Republican	Laura Dancho (incumbent)	5,871	45.9%
Total votes		12,797	100%

=== District 121 ===
Connecticut's 121st House of Representatives district election, 2024
Party	Candidate	Votes	%
Democratic	Joe Gresko	6,572	66.5%
Republican	Rafael Irizarry	3,317	33.5%
Total votes		9,889	100%

=== District 122 ===
Connecticut's 122nd House of Representatives district election, 2024
Party	Candidate	Votes	%
Republican	Ben McGorty	8,016	56.5%
Democratic	Dorothy Lerner	6,161	43.5%
Total votes		14,177	100%

=== District 123 ===
Connecticut's 123rd House of Representatives district election, 2024
Party	Candidate	Votes	%
Republican	David Rutigliano	7,589	54.8%
Democratic	Tom Tesoro	6,252	45.2%
Total votes		13,841	100%

=== District 124 ===
Connecticut's 124th House of Representatives district election, 2024
Party	Candidate	Votes	%
Democratic	Andre Baker	3,665	74.7%
Republican	Yoshiyahu Yisrael	904	18.4%
New Movement	Eneida Martinez	340	6.9%
Total votes		4,909	100%

=== District 125 ===
Connecticut's 125th House of Representatives district election, 2024
Party	Candidate	Votes	%
Republican	Tom O'Dea	6,693	55.7%
Democratic	Jason Bennett	5,316	44.3%
Total votes		12,009	100%

=== District 126 ===
Connecticut's 126th House of Representatives district election, 2024
Party	Candidate	Votes	%
Democratic	Fred Gee Jr.	5,653	77.6%
Republican	David Herz	1,632	22.4%
Total votes		7,285	100%

=== District 127 ===
Connecticut's 127th House of Representatives district election, 2024
Party	Candidate	Votes	%
Democratic	Marcus Brown	4,474	100%
Total votes		4,474	100%

=== District 128 ===
Connecticut's 128th House of Representatives district election, 2024
Party	Candidate	Votes	%
Democratic	Christopher Rosario	2,288	78.2%
Republican	Ramona Marquez	567	19.4%
Independent	Angel Gonzalez	70	2.4%
Total votes		2,925	100%

=== District 129 ===
Connecticut's 129th House of Representatives district election, 2024
Party	Candidate	Votes	%
Democratic	Steven Stafstrom	1,056	71%
Republican	Francis Kalangala	431	29%
Total votes		1,487	100%

=== District 130 ===
Connecticut's 130th House of Representatives district election, 2024
Party	Candidate	Votes	%
Democratic	Antonio Felipe	1,050	76%
Republican	Terry Sullivan	331	24%
Total votes		1,381	100%

=== District 131 ===
Connecticut's 131st House of Representatives district election, 2024
Party	Candidate	Votes	%
Republican	Arnold Jensen	5,451	59.8%
Democratic	Ellen Fox	3,664	40.2%
Total votes		9,115	100%

=== District 132 ===
Connecticut's 132nd House of Representatives district election, 2024
Party	Candidate	Votes	%
Democratic	Jennifer Leeper	7,615	57.7%
Republican	Alexis Harrison	5,577	42.3%
Total votes		13,192	100%

=== District 133 ===
Connecticut's 133rd House of Representatives district election, 2024
Party	Candidate	Votes	%
Democratic	Cristin McCarthy Vahey	8,046	65.6%
Republican	Chris Verras	4,214	34.4%
Total votes		12,260	100%

=== District 134 ===
Connecticut's 134th House of Representatives district election, 2024
Party	Candidate	Votes	%
Democratic	Sarah Keitt (incumbent)	7,150	52.1%
Republican	Melissa Longo	6,574	47.9%
Total votes		13,724	100%

=== District 135 ===
Connecticut's 135th House of Representatives district election, 2024
Party	Candidate	Votes	%
Democratic	Anne Hughes (incumbent)	8,039	61.8%
Republican	Christopher Peritore	4,962	38.2%
Total votes		13,001	100%

=== District 136 ===
Connecticut's 136th House of Representatives district election, 2024
Party	Candidate	Votes	%
Democratic	Jonathan Steinberg (incumbent)	9,418	67.7%
Republican	John Bolton	4,496	32.3%
Total votes		13,914	100%

=== District 137 ===
Connecticut's 137th House of Representatives district election, 2024
Party	Candidate	Votes	%
Democratic	Kadeem Roberts (incumbent)	6,046	66.8%
Republican	Pietro Rotondo	3,005	33.2%
Total votes		9,051	100%

=== District 138 ===
Connecticut's 138th House of Representatives district election, 2024
Party	Candidate	Votes	%
Democratic	Ken Gucker	4,666	50.8%
Republican	Rachel Chaleski (incumbent)	4,524	49.2%
Total votes		9,190	100%

=== District 139 ===
Connecticut's 139th House of Representatives district election, 2024
Party	Candidate	Votes	%
Democratic	Kevin Ryan (incumbent)	5,904	54.7%
Republican	Mark Adams	4,895	45.3%
Total votes		10,799	100%

=== District 140 ===
Connecticut's 140th House of Representatives district election, 2024
Party	Candidate	Votes	%
Democratic	Travis Simms (incumbent)	2,547	72%
Republican	Enrique Santiago	992	28%
Total votes		3,539	100%

=== District 141 ===
Connecticut's 141st House of Representatives district election, 2024
Party	Candidate	Votes	%
Republican	Tracy Marra (incumbent)	7,814	58.2%
Democratic	Sheila Quinn	5,609	41.8%
Total votes		13,423	100%

=== District 142 ===
Connecticut's 142nd House of Representatives district election, 2024
Party	Candidate	Votes	%
Democratic	Lucy Dathan (incumbent)	8,965	100%
Total votes		8,965	100%

=== District 143 ===
Connecticut's 143rd House of Representatives district election, 2024
Party	Candidate	Votes	%
Democratic	Dominique Johnson (incumbent)	3,977	57.2%
Republican	Peter Bang	2,977	42.8%
Total votes		6,954	100%

=== District 144 ===
Connecticut's 144th House of Representatives district election, 2024
Party	Candidate	Votes	%
Democratic	Hubert Delany (incumbent)	3,455	59%
Republican	Layne Rodney	2,402	41%
Total votes		5,857	100%

=== District 145 ===
Connecticut's 145th House of Representatives district election, 2024
Party	Candidate	Votes	%
Democratic	Corey Paris (incumbent)	2,485	72.3%
Republican	Fritz Blau	953	27.7%
Total votes		3,438	100%

=== District 146 ===
Democratic primary
Party	Candidate	Votes	%
Democratic	Eilish Collins Main	548	55.74%
Democratic	David Michel (incumbent)	435	44.26%
Total votes		983	100.00%

Connecticut's 146th House of Representatives district election, 2024
Party	Candidate	Votes	%
Democratic	Eilish Collins Main	2,843	57.9%
Republican	James Malerba	2,068	42.1%
Total votes		4,911	100%

=== District 147 ===
Connecticut's 147th House of Representatives district election, 2024
Party	Candidate	Votes	%
Democratic	Matt Blumenthal (incumbent)	7,246	60.95%
Republican	Rodolfo Settimi	4,642	39.05%
Total votes		11,888	100.0%

=== District 148 ===
Incumbent one-term Democratic state representative Anabel Figueroa ran for re-election against Jonathan Jacobson, a member of the Stamford Board of Representatives.

Figueroa faced criticism for some of her socially conservative stances, including her opposition to abortion. She later gained controversy for anti-semetic remarks she made about her opponent, stating "The Hispanic vote is going to determine on August 13th who will win to represent or who will continue to represent you. We cannot permit a person who is of Jewish origin, to represent our community.", in reference to Jonathan Jacobson, who is Jewish. Jacobson went on to easily beat Figueroa.

Democratic primary
Party	Candidate	Votes	%
Democratic	Jonathan Jacobson	600	62.63%
Democratic	Anabel Figueroa (incumbent)	358	37.37%
Total votes		958	100.00%

Connecticut's 148th House of Representatives district election, 2024
Party	Candidate	Votes	%
Democratic	Jonathan Jacobson	4,910	64.55%
Republican	Olga Anastos	2,697	35.45%
Total votes		7,607	100.0%

=== District 149 ===
Connecticut's 149th House of Representatives district election, 2024
Party	Candidate	Votes	%
Republican	Tina Courpas	7,124	51.80%
Total	Rachel Khanna (incumbent)	6,628	48.2%
Democratic	Rachel Khanna	6,469	47.04%
Independent Party	Rachel Khanna	159	1.16%
Total votes		13,572	100.0%

=== District 150 ===
Connecticut's 150th House of Representatives district election, 2024
Party	Candidate	Votes	%
Democratic	Steve Meskers (incumbent)	6,378	56.24%
Republican	Paul Cappiali	4,963	43.76%
Total votes		11,341	100.0%

=== District 151 ===
Connecticut's 151st House of Representatives district election, 2024
Party	Candidate	Votes	%
Democratic	Hector Arzeno (incumbent)	6,826	51.54%
Republican	Tod Laudonia	6,418	48.46%
Total votes		13,244	100.0%
