= Eli Sabin =

American politician

Member-elect of the Connecticut House of Representatives from the 92nd district
- Assuming office January 2027
- Succeeding: Patricia Dillon

Personal details
- Born: Eli Sabin; 2000 (age 25–26) New Haven, Connecticut
- Party: Democratic
- Education: Yale University (BA, JD)
- Website: Campaign website

Eli Sabin is an American politician. A member of the Democratic Party, he is the member-elect for the 92nd district of the Connecticut House of Representatives. He was elected at the 2026 election. He is a former Alder for the City of New Haven.
