= Kathleen Tallarita =

American politician (born 1965)

Member of the Connecticut House of Representatives from the 58th district
- In office January 6, 1999 – January 9, 2013
- Preceded by: Fred Gelsi
- Succeeded by: David J. Alexander

Personal details
- Born: May 2, 1965 (age 61) Enfield, Connecticut, U.S.
- Party: Democratic

Kathleen Tallarita (born May 2, 1965) is an American politician who served in the Connecticut House of Representatives from 1999 to 2013, representing the 58th district.
