= Connecticut's 91st House of Representatives district =

American legislative district

Connecticut's 91st State House of Representatives district
Representative
Laurie Sweet; D

Connecticut's 91st House of Representatives district elects one member of the Connecticut House of Representatives. It encompasses parts of Hamden and has been represented by Democrat Laurie Sweet since 2025.

== List of representatives ==
List of Representatives from Connecticut's 91st House District
Representative	Party	Years	District home	Note
Hugh M. McCabe	Democratic	1967–1969	Waterbury	Seat created
William J. Scully Jr.	Democratic	1969–1973	Waterbury	
Kenneth DeMatteis	Republican	1973–1975	Hamden	
Ronald Smoko	Democratic	1975–1977	Hamden	
Leonard Caplan	Republican	1977–1979	Hamden	
Ronald Smoko	Democratic	1979–1993	Hamden	
Peter Villano	Democratic	1993–2013	Hamden	
Michael D'Agostino	Democratic	2013–2025	Hamden	
Laurie Sweet	Democratic	2025–	Hamden	

== Recent elections ==
=== 2020 ===
2020 Connecticut State House of Representatives election, District 91
Party	Candidate	Votes	%
Democratic	Michael D'Agostino (incumbent)	9,680	88.91
Petitioning	Weruche U. George	1,208	11.09
Total votes		10,888	100.00
Democratic hold			

=== 2018 ===
2018 Connecticut House of Representatives election, District 91
Party	Candidate	Votes	%
Democratic	Mike D'Agostino (Incumbent)	7,841	92.1
Libertarian	Gary Walsh	669	7.9
Total votes		8,510	100.00
Democratic hold			

=== 2016 ===
2016 Connecticut House of Representatives election, District 91
Party	Candidate	Votes	%
Democratic	Mike D'Agostino (Incumbent)	8,333	71.16
Republican	James Lynch	3,377	28.84
Total votes		11,710	100.00
Democratic hold			

=== 2014 ===
2014 Connecticut House of Representatives election, District 91
Party	Candidate	Votes	%
Democratic	Mike D'Agostino (Incumbent)	6,233	100.00
Total votes		6,233	100.00
Democratic hold			

=== 2012 ===
2012 Connecticut House of Representatives election, District 91
Party	Candidate	Votes	%
Democratic	Mike D'Agostino	8,783	100.00
Total votes		8,783	100.00
Democratic hold			
