= Jason Buchsbaum =

American politician

Member of the Connecticut House of Representatives from the 69th district
- Incumbent
- Assumed office January 8, 2025
- Preceded by: Cindy Harrison

Personal details
- Born: 1980 (age 45–46)
- Party: Republican
- Website: https://www.jasonforct.com/

Jason Buchsbaum is an American politician and member of the Connecticut House of Representatives since 2024 from the 69th district, which consists of Bridgewater, a portion of New Milford, Roxbury, and a majority of Southbury.
