= Victor Cuevas =

American politician

Member of the Connecticut House of Representatives from the 75th district
- In office January 9, 2013 – March 2016
- Preceded by: David Aldarondo
- Succeeded by: Geraldo Reyes

Personal details
- Party: Democratic

Victor Cuevas is an American politician who served in the Connecticut House of Representatives from the 75th district from 2013 to 2016.
