= Walter Pawelkiewicz =

American politician (1949–2026)

Member of the Connecticut House of Representatives from the 49th district
- In office January 6, 1999 – January 7, 2009
- Preceded by: John J. Lescoe Jr.
- Succeeded by: Susan Johnson

Personal details
- Born: Vladyslaw Marion; February 8, 1949 Oberlahnstein, Rhineland-Palatinate, Germany
- Died: February 21, 2026 (aged 77) Westerly, Rhode Island, U.S.
- Party: Democratic

Walter Pawelkiewicz (born Vladyslaw Marion, February 8, 1949 – February 21, 2026) was an American politician who served in the Connecticut House of Representatives from the 49th district from 1999 to 2009. Pawelkiewicz died from cancer on February 21, 2026, at the age of 77.
