= DeWayne Wynn =

American politician

Member-elect of the Connecticut House of Representatives from the 77th district
- Assuming office January 2027
- Succeeding: Cara Pavalock-D'Amato

Personal details
- Party: Democratic
- Website: Campaign website

DeWayne Wynn Jr. is an American politician. A member of the Democratic Party, he is the member-elect for the 77th district of the Connecticut House of Representatives. Wynn unseated incumbent Republican Cara Pavalock-D'Amato at the 2026 election.
