= Laurie Sweet =

American politician

Member of the Connecticut House of Representatives from the 91st district
- Incumbent
- Assumed office January 8, 2025
- Preceded by: Michael D'Agostino

Personal details
- Born: 1980 (age 45–46)
- Party: Democratic Party
- Other political affiliations: Democratic Socialists of America
- Education: Bryn Mawr College; New York University; Ohio State University
- Website: House Website; Campaign Website

Laurie Sweet (born 1980) is an American politician and member of the Connecticut House of Representatives since 2025 from the 91st district, which consists of parts of Hamden.

== Education and early career ==
Laurie Sweet earned her B.A. in classical studies from Bryn Mawr College in 2002. In 2004 she earned her M.A. in art history, criticism and conservation from the Institute of Fine Arts, New York University. In 2009 she was awarded a Ph.D. in Art History from Ohio State University.

From 2009 to 2011 she was an adjunct professor at Ithaca College. After moving to Connecticut in 2011, Sweet practiced as a birth doula for 7 years.

== Political career ==
In 2021, Sweet was elected to the Hamden, Connecticut Legislative Council. She was re-elected in 2023, and became chair of the education committee and vice chair of the sustainability committee. During her tenure on the Council, Sweet worked toward the remediation of the Six Lakes in Hamden. She also worked with housing experts to amend Hamden's housing ordinance in order to provide recognition of tenant unions and provide for resolution of collective complaints which allows for more efficient and effective determination of landlord-tenant disputes.

In August 2024, Sweet entered an open Democratic primary for the 91st district of the state House of Representatives. At 10 p.m. of the night of the election, Sweet was declared the winner by 69 votes. Ninety minutes later, however, after opponent Jennifer Pope had conceded the nomination, the chair of Hamden's Democratic Town Committee announced that owing to "human error in counting," Pope had won by two votes. A recount completed a week after the voting, concluded that Sweet had actually won the election, 947-932, after an envelope containing uncounted votes was found.

In the general election, Sweet ran unopposed, collecting 7,921 votes on the Democratic line and 779 votes on the Working Families Party line.

On being sworn in on January 8, 2025, Representative Sweet was assigned to the Environment, Higher Education and Housing committees. In addition, she was named as Vice Chair of the newly formed bipartisan End Homelessness Caucus.
