= Connecticut's 89th House of Representatives district =

American legislative district

Connecticut's 89th State House of Representatives district
Representative
| Lezlye Zupkus; R |

Connecticut's 89th House of Representatives district elects one member of the Connecticut House of Representatives. It consists of the towns of Bethany, Prospect, and parts of Cheshire. It has been represented by Republican Lezlye Zupkus since 2013.

== List of representatives ==
List of Representatives from Connecticut's 89th State House District
| Representative | Party | Years | District home | Note |
|---|---|---|---|---|
| Francis W. Ciampi | Democratic | 1967–1973 | Waterbury | Seat created |
| Richard A. Dice | Republican | 1973–1977 | Cheshire | |
| Philip S. Robertson | Republican | 1977–1981 | Cheshire | |
| David O. Thorp | Republican | 1981–1995 | Cheshire | |
| Vickie Orsini Nardello | Democratic | 1995–2013 | Prospect | |
| Lezlye Zupkus | Republican | 2013– | Prospect | |

== Recent elections ==
=== 2022 ===
2022 Connecticut State House of Representatives election, District 89
| Party | Candidate | Votes | % |
|---|---|---|---|
| Republican | Lezlye Zupkus (incumbent) | 7,056 | 61.60 |
| Democratic | Kevin J. O'Leary | 4,232 | 36.95 |
| Independent Party | Lezlye Zupkus (incumbent) | 166 | 1.45 |
| Total votes | | 11,454 | 100.00 |
| Republican hold | | | |

=== 2020 ===
2020 Connecticut State House of Representatives election, District 89
| Party | Candidate | Votes | % |
|---|---|---|---|
| Republican | Lezlye Zupkus (incumbent) | 8,870 | 60.27 |
| Democratic | E.J. Maher | 5,351 | 36.36 |
| Independent Party | Lezlye Zupkus (incumbent) | 496 | 3.37 |
| Total votes | | 14,717 | 100.00 |
| Republican hold | | | |

=== 2018 ===
2018 Connecticut House of Representatives election, District 89
| Party | Candidate | Votes | % |
|---|---|---|---|
| Republican | Lezlye Zupkus (Incumbent) | 7,623 | 63.6 |
| Democratic | Anne Harrigan | 4,367 | 36.4 |
| Total votes | | 11,990 | 100.00 |
| Republican hold | | | |

=== 2016 ===
2016 Connecticut House of Representatives election, District 89
| Party | Candidate | Votes | % |
|---|---|---|---|
| Republican | Lezlye Zupkus (Incumbent) | 10,446 | 100.00 |
| Total votes | | 10,446 | 100.00 |
| Republican hold | | | |

=== 2014 ===
2014 Connecticut House of Representatives election, District 89
| Party | Candidate | Votes | % |
|---|---|---|---|
| Republican | Lezlye Zupkus | 5,657 | 57.0 |
| Democratic | Vicki Orsini Nardello | 3,727 | 37.5 |
| Working Families | Vicki Orsini Nardello | 315 | 3.2 |
| Independent Party | Lezlye Zupkus | 228 | 2.3 |
| Total votes | | 9,927 | 100.00 |
| Republican hold | | | |

=== 2012 ===
2012 Connecticut House of Representatives election, District 89
| Party | Candidate | Votes | % |
|---|---|---|---|
| Republican | Lezlye Zupkus | 6,229 | 51 |
| Democratic | Vicki Orsini Nardello (Incumbent) | 5,996 | 49 |
| Total votes | | 12,225 | 100.00 |
| Republican gain from Democratic | | | |
