= Steven Winter (Connecticut politician) =

American politician

Member of the Connecticut House of Representatives from the 94th district
- Incumbent
- Assumed office January 8, 2025
- Preceded by: Robyn Porter

Personal details
- Born: 1988 (age 37–38)
- Party: Democratic
- Website: https://www.steveforstaterep.com/

Steven B. Winter (born 1988) is an American politician and member of the Connecticut House of Representatives since 2024 from the 94th district, which contains parts of Hamden and New Haven. He previously served as the Alder for the 21st Ward on the New Haven Board of Alders from 2018 through 2022.

Since 2022, he has also served as the Executive Director of Climate & Sustainability for the City of New Haven's Office of Climate and Sustainability.
