= Rosalind Berman =

American politician (died 2012)

Member of the Connecticut House of Representatives from the 92nd district
- In office 1977–1985
- Preceded by: Albert Webber
- Succeeded by: Patricia Dillon

Personal details
- Born: 1924 or 1925
- Died: September 26, 2012 (aged 87)
- Party: Republican
- Spouse: Arnold Berman
- Children: 3
- Education: University of Connecticut

Rosalind "Roz" Berman (died September 26, 2012) was an American politician who served in the Connecticut House of Representatives from 1977 to 1985, representing the 92nd district as a Republican. She was Jewish.
