= Linda Gentile =

American politician

Member of the Connecticut House of Representatives from the 104th district
- In office January 5, 2005 – January 9, 2019
- Preceded by: Vincent Tonucci
- Succeeded by: Kara Rochelle

Personal details
- Born: February 19, 1951 (age 75) Derby, Connecticut, U.S.
- Party: Democratic

Linda Gentile (born February 19, 1951) is an American politician who served in the Connecticut House of Representatives from the 104th district from 2005 to 2019.
