= Vincent Tonucci =

American politician (1950–2022)

Member of the Connecticut House of Representatives from the 104th district
- In office January 7, 1987 – January 5, 2005
- Preceded by: Tom Dudchik
- Succeeded by: Linda Gentile

Personal details
- Born: March 2, 1950 Derby, Connecticut
- Died: July 19, 2022 (aged 72) Derby, Connecticut
- Party: Democratic

Vincent Tonucci (March 2, 1950 – July 19, 2022) was an American politician who served in the Connecticut House of Representatives from the 104th district from 1987 to 2005.

He died of pancreatic cancer on July 19, 2022, in Derby, Connecticut at age 72.
