= David Aldarondo =

American politician

Member of the Connecticut House of Representatives from the 75th district
- In office January 5, 2005 – January 9, 2013
- Preceded by: Thomas F. Conway
- Succeeded by: Victor Cuevas

Personal details
- Born: October 12, 1969 (age 56) Aguadilla, Puerto Rico
- Party: Democratic

David Aldarondo (born October 12, 1969) is an American politician who served in the Connecticut House of Representatives from the 75th district from 2005 to 2013.
