= Albert Webber =

American politician (1912–1997)

Member of the Connecticut House of Representatives from the 92nd district
- In office 1973–1977
- Preceded by: John D. Mahaney
- Succeeded by: Rosalind Berman

Member of the Connecticut House of Representatives from the 113th district
- In office 1967–1973
- Preceded by: Seat established
- Succeeded by: James S. Connery

Member of the Connecticut House of Representatives from New Haven
- In office 1959–1967 Serving with Joseph M. Rourke
- Preceded by: Edith Valet Cook; Charles Tomasino
- Succeeded by: Seat eliminated

Personal details
- Born: September 28, 1912 New Haven, Connecticut, U.S.
- Died: January 13, 1997 (aged 84)
- Party: Democratic
- Spouse: Sally Goodmark Webber

Albert R. Webber (September 28, 1912 – January 13, 1997) was an American politician who served in the Connecticut House of Representatives. A Democrat, Webber represented the city of New Haven from 1959 to 1967, the 113th district from 1967 to 1973, and the 92nd district from 1973 to 1977.

== Personal life ==
Webber was born in New Haven, Connecticut, on September 28, 1912, to Louis and Fannie Webber. He served in the U.S. Army during World War II, and he owned a plumbing supply company from 1943 through the 1960s. Webber had four children.

== Career ==
A Democrat, Webber was first elected to the Connecticut House of Representatives in 1958 to serve as one of two representatives from the city of New Haven. Webber served alongside fellow Democrat Joseph M. Rourke until 1967. Webber and Rourke had no successors as Connecticut redistricted prior to the 1966 election, eliminating the use of single-town districts. When Webber was reelected, it was to the newly created 113th district. He served three terms. In 1972, Connecticut again redistricted, and Webber was elected to two terms representing the 92nd district.

== Death ==
Webber died on January 13, 1997, at age 84.
