= Connecticut's 63rd House of Representatives district =

American legislative district

Connecticut's 63rd State House of Representatives district
Representative
Jay Case; R

Connecticut's 63rd House of Representatives district elects one member of the Connecticut House of Representatives. Its current representative is Jay Case. The district includes the towns of Colebrook and Winchester, along with parts of Goshen and Torrington.

== List of representatives ==
List of representatives from Connecticut's 63rd State House district
Representative	Party	Years	District home	Note
Ray D. Holdridge	Republican	1967–1973	Ledyard	Seat created
John Groppo	Democratic	1973–1985	Winsted	
Anthony J. Nania	Republican	1985–1991	North Canaan	
F. Philip Prelli	Republican	1991–2003	Winchester	Did not run for reelection
George Wilber	Democratic	2003–2008	Colebrook	Resigned
John Rigby	Republican	2009–2013	Colebrook	
Jay Case	Republican	2013–present	Winchester	

== Recent elections ==
State Election 2008: House District 63
Party	Candidate	Votes	%	±%
Republican	John Rigby	6,102	70.0	+40.4
Independent	William O. Riiska	2,610	30.0	+30.0
Majority		3,492	40.1	+82.9
Turnout		8,712		
Republican gain from Democratic		Swing	+35.2	

State Election 2006: House District 63
Party	Candidate	Votes	%	±%
Democratic	George Wilber	5,556	67.2	+13.2
Republican	Juliana H. Simone	2,366	29.6	−14.3
Working Families	George Wilber	346	4.2	+1.1
Majority		3,536	42.8	+28.6
Turnout		8,268		
Democratic hold		Swing	+14.3	

State Election 2004: House District 63
Party	Candidate	Votes	%	±%
Democratic	George Wilber	5,917	54.0	+3.6
Republican	David A. Cappabianca	4,700	43.9	−4.7
Working Families	George Wilber	344	3.1	+1.1
Majority		1,561	14.2	+11.5
Turnout		10,961		
Democratic hold		Swing	+4.7	

State Election 2002: House District 63
Party	Candidate	Votes	%	±%
Democratic	George Wilber	3,880	50.4	+50.4
Republican	David A. Cappabianca	3,670	47.6	−52.4
Working Families	Cynthia E. Vines	156	2.0	+2.0
Majority		210	2.7	−102.7
Turnout		7,706		
Democratic gain from Republican		Swing	+51.4	

State Election 2000: House District 63
Party	Candidate	Votes	%	±%
Republican	F. Philip Prelli	5,854	100.0	0.0
Majority		5,854	100.0	0.0
Turnout		5,854		
Republican hold		Swing	0.0	

State Election 1998: House District 63
Party	Candidate	Votes	%	±%
Republican	F. Philip Prelli	4,565	100.0	
Majority		4,565	100.0	
Turnout		4,565		
Republican hold		Swing		
