= Peter Villano =

American politician (1924–2024)

Member of the Connecticut House of Representatives from the 91st district
- In office January 6, 1993 – January 9, 2013
- Preceded by: Ronald Smoko
- Succeeded by: Michael D'Agostino

Personal details
- Born: January 26, 1924 New Haven, Connecticut, U.S.
- Died: February 4, 2024 (aged 100) New Haven, Connecticut, U.S.
- Party: Democratic

Peter Villano (January 26, 1924 – February 4, 2024) was an American politician who served in the Connecticut House of Representatives from the 91st district from 1993 to 2013. He served as a congressional aide to Robert Giaimo and was a two-term mayor of Hamden. During World War II, he served in the Navy, and wrote a memoir about his experiences titled War to Peace.

Villano died on February 4, 2024, at the age of 100.
