= Reginald Beamon =

American politician (born 1951)

Member of the Connecticut House of Representatives from the 72nd district
- In office January 7, 1987 – January 3, 2007
- Preceded by: Maurice Mosley
- Succeeded by: Larry Butler

Personal details
- Born: February 17, 1951 (age 75) Waterbury, Connecticut, U.S.
- Party: Democratic

Reginald Beamon (born February 17, 1951) is an American politician who served in the Connecticut House of Representatives from the 72nd district from 1987 to 2007.
