= Carol Herskowitz =

American politician (died 2007)

Member of the Connecticut House of Representatives from the 69th district
- In office 1981–1989
- Preceded by: William F. Rogers III
- Succeeded by: Arthur J. O'Neill

Personal details
- Born: 1942 or 1943
- Died: May 19, 2007 (aged 64)
- Party: Republican
- Spouse: Jerald Herskowitz
- Children: 3

Carol A. Herskowitz (1942 or 1943 – May 19, 2007) was an American politician who served in the Connecticut House of Representatives from 1981 to 1989, representing the 69th district as a Republican.

== Personal life ==
Herskowitz was married to Jerald Herskowitz, and together they had three children.

Herskowitz died on May 19, 2007, of Lou Gehrig's disease. She was 64. The Connecticut General Assembly passed a resolution expressing sympathy on her death during its January 2007 session.

== Political career ==
Herskowitz was first elected to the Connecticut House of Representatives in 1980, defeating Democratic opponent Kevin P. White Jr., and she served four terms representing the 69th district as a Republican. She did not run for reelection in 1988 and was succeeded by fellow Republican Arthur J. O'Neill.
