= F. Philip Prelli =

American politician

Member of the Connecticut House of Representatives from the 63rd district
- In office January 9, 1991 – January 8, 2003
- Preceded by: Anthony J. Nania
- Succeeded by: George Wilber

Personal details
- Born: November 16, 1948 (age 77)
- Party: Republican

F. Philip Prelli (born November 16, 1948) is an American politician who served in the Connecticut House of Representatives from the 63rd district from 1991 to 2003.
