= Connecticut's 104th House of Representatives district =

American legislative district

Connecticut's 104th State House of Representatives district
Representative
Kara Rochelle; D

Connecticut's 104th House of Representatives district elects one member of the Connecticut House of Representatives. It consists of the city of Ansonia and parts of Derby. It has been represented by Democrat Kara Rochelle since 2019.

== List of representatives ==
List of Representatives from Connecticut's 104th State House District
Representative	Party	Years	District home	Note
Robert G. Oliver	Democratic	1967–1973	New Haven	Seat created
Carl R. Allejo Jr.	Democratic	1973–1975	Ansonia	
Silvio A. Mastrianni	Democratic	1975–1983	Derby	
John T. Bennett	Democratic	1983–1985	Ansonia	
Tom Dudchik	Republican	1985–1987	Ansonia	
Vincent Tonucci	Democratic	1987–2005	Derby	
Linda Gentile	Democratic	2005–2019	Ansonia	
Kara Rochelle	Democratic	2019–	Derby	

== Recent elections ==
=== 2024 ===
Connecticut's 104th State House District Results, 2024
Party	Candidate	Votes	%
Democratic	Kara Rochelle	4,604	49.3%
Working Families	Kara Rochelle	438	4.7%
Total	Kara Rochelle	5,042	54.0%
Republican	David Cassetti	4,176	44.7%
Independent Party	Thomas Egan	118	1.3%
Total votes		6,393	100%
Democratic hold			

=== 2022 ===
Connecticut's 104th State House District Results, 2022
Party	Candidate	Votes	%
Democratic	Kara Rochelle	3,185	49.8%
Independent Party	Kara Rochelle	99	1.5%
Working Families	Kara Rochelle	87	1.4%
Total	Kara Rochelle	3,371	52.7%
Republican	Josh Shuart	3,022	47.3%
Total votes		6,393	100%
Democratic hold			

=== 2020 ===
Connecticut's 104th State House District Results, 2020
Party	Candidate	Votes	%
Democratic	Kara Rochelle	5,346	53.9%
Independent Party	Kara Rochelle	329	3.3%
Working Families	Kara Rochelle	235	2.4%
Total	Kara Rochelle	5,910	59.6%
Republican	Myra Rivers	4,004	40.4%
Total votes		9,914	100%
Democratic hold			

=== 2018 ===
Connecticut's 104th State House District Results, 2018
Party	Candidate	Votes	%
Democratic	Kara Rochelle	3,785	52.8%
Working Families	Kara Rochelle	345	4.8%
Total	Kara Rochelle	4,130	56.9%
Republican	Joseph Jaumann	3,002	41.4%
Independent Party	Joseph Jaumann	121	1.7%
Total	Joseph Jaumann	3,123	43.1%
Total votes		7,253	100%
Democratic hold			

=== 2016 ===
2016 Connecticut House of Representatives election, District 104
Party	Candidate	Votes	%
Democratic	Linda Gentile (Incumbent)	4,880	57.06
Republican	Joseph Jaumann	3,673	42.94
Total votes		8,553	100.00
Democratic hold			

=== 2014 ===
2014 Connecticut House of Representatives election, District 104
Party	Candidate	Votes	%
Democratic	Linda Gentile (Incumbent)	3,323	60.5
Republican	Gary W. Giannone	1,848	33.6
Working Families	Linda Gentile (Incumbent)	325	5.9
Total votes		5,496	100.00
Democratic hold			

=== 2012 ===
2012 Connecticut House of Representatives election, District 104
Party	Candidate	Votes	%
Democratic	Linda Gentile (Incumbent)	5,664	75.1
Republican	Gary W. Giannone	1,881	24.9
Total votes		7,545	100.00
Democratic hold			
