= Patricia Dillon =

American politician

Member of the Connecticut House of Representatives from the 92nd district
- In office 1985–2027
- Preceded by: Rosalind Berman
- Succeeded by: Eli Sabin (elect)

Personal details
- Born: July 9, 1948 (age 78) Queens, New York, U.S.
- Party: Democratic
- Education: Marymount Manhattan College (BA); Ohio State University (MA); Yale University (MPH)

Patricia A. Dillon (born July 9, 1948) is an American Democratic Party politician currently serving as a member of the Connecticut House of Representatives from the 92nd district, which encompasses part of New Haven, since 1985. Dillon has served in the house for 41 years, making her the second longest serving member of the Connecticut House of Representatives. In 2021, Dillon, alongside State Senator Gary Winfield, introduced a bill to make pizza Connecticut's official state food. Dillon currently serves as a member of the House Judiciary Committee, Appropriations Committee, and Environment Committee.
