= Vickie Orsini Nardello =

American politician (born 1954)

Member of the Connecticut House of Representatives from the 89th district
- In office January 4, 1995 – January 9, 2013
- Preceded by: David O. Thorp
- Succeeded by: Lezlye Zupkus

Personal details
- Born: February 7, 1954 (age 72) Pontelandolfo, Italy
- Party: Democratic

Vickie Orsini Nardello (born February 7, 1954) is an American politician who served in the Connecticut House of Representatives from the 89th district from 1995 to 2013.
