= Connecticut's 94th House of Representatives district =

American legislative district

Connecticut's 94th State House of Representatives district
Representative
Steven Winter; D

Connecticut's 94th House of Representatives district elects one member of the Connecticut House of Representatives. It encompasses parts of Hamden and New Haven. It has been represented by Democrat Steven Winter since 2025.

== List of representatives ==
Representative	Party	Years	District home	Note
Bernard L. Avcollie	Democratic	1967 – 1973	Naugatuck	Redistricted to the 70th District
Bruce L. Morris	Democratic	1973 – 1977	New Haven	Redistricted from the 111th District
William R. Dyson	Democratic	1977 – 2009	New Haven	
Gary Winfield	Democratic	2009 – 2014	New Haven	Later served as a Connecticut State Senator
Robyn Porter	Democratic	2014 – 2025	New Haven	
Steven Winter	Democratic	2025 – present	New Haven	

== Recent elections ==
=== 2020 ===
2020 Connecticut State House of Representatives election, District 94
Party	Candidate	Votes	%
Democratic	Robyn Porter (incumbent)	7,536	100.00
Democratic hold			

=== 2018 ===
2018 Connecticut House of Representatives election, District 94
Party	Candidate	Votes	%
Democratic	Robyn Porter (Incumbent)	6,242	89.4
Republican	Jordan Grode	743	10.6
Total votes		6,985	100.00
Democratic hold			

=== 2016 ===
2016 Connecticut House of Representatives election, District 94
Party	Candidate	Votes	%
Democratic	Robyn Porter (Incumbent)	7,426	100.0
Total votes		7,426	100.00
Democratic hold			

=== 2014 ===
2014 Connecticut House of Representatives election, District 94
Party	Candidate	Votes	%
Democratic	Robyn Porter (Incumbent)	4,475	90.8
Working Families	Robyn Porter (Incumbent)	242	4.9
Green	David R. Olszta	214	4.3
Total votes		4,931	100.00
Democratic hold			

=== 2014 special ===
2014 Connecticut House of Representatives Special election, District 94
Party	Candidate	Votes	%
Democratic	Robyn Porter	348	38.1
Democratic	Berita Rowe-Lewis	239	26.2
Democratic	Charles Ashe	202	22.1
Democratic	Len Caplan	81	8.9
Republican	Reynaud Harp	43	4.7
Total votes		913	100.00
Democratic hold			

=== 2012 ===
2012 Connecticut House of Representatives election, District 94
Party	Candidate	Votes	%
Democratic	Gary Winfield (Incumbent)	8,301	100.0
Total votes		8,301	100.00
Democratic hold			
