= Tom Arnone =

American politician

Member of the Connecticut House of Representatives from the 58th district
- In office January 9, 2019 – January 8, 2025
- Preceded by: Greg Stokes
- Succeeded by: John Santanella

Personal details
- Born: Enfield, Connecticut, U.S.
- Party: Democratic
- Education: California State University, Sacramento

Tom Arnone is an American politician formerly serving as a member of the Connecticut House of Representatives. Arnone is a Democrat who represented district 58 from 2019 to 2025, which is included in the town of Enfield, CT. Arnone was first elected to this seat in 2018, winning by an 8-point margin over Republican Greg Stokes. Arnone was re-elected by a 12 point margin in 2020 over Enfield Republican Town Chairwoman Mary Ann Turner. Arnone was elected for a third-time in this seat, winning by an 8-point margin over Republican Bob Hendrickson in 2022. For the 2023 Legislative Session, he served on the Committee on Children, the Executive & Legislative Nominations Committee, and the Regulations Review Committee. Additionally, Representative Arnone was appointed as Assistant Majority Whip.
