= Cindy Harrison =

American politician from Connecticut

Member of the Connecticut House of Representatives from the 69th district
- In office January 6, 2021 – January 8, 2025
- Preceded by: Arthur O'Neill
- Succeeded by: Jason Buchsbaum

Personal details
- Party: Republican
- Education: Upsala College (BA); University of Connecticut (MBA)

Cindy Harrison is an American politician formerly serving as a Connecticut State Representative representing the 69th district, which includes the towns of Bridgewater, Roxbury, Washington and part of Southbury. A member of the Republican Party, Harrison was first elected to the seat in 2020. Harrison served as a member of the House Appropriations Committee, Transportation Committee, and Environment Committee.

== Personal life ==
Harrison was born in Newtown, Connecticut. She earned a bachelor's degree in accounting from Upsala College and a master's degree in finance from the University of Connecticut.
