= Michael D'Agostino (politician) =

American politician

Member of the Connecticut House of Representatives from the 91st district
- In office January 9, 2013 – January 8, 2025
- Preceded by: Peter Villano
- Succeeded by: Laurie Sweet

Personal details
- Born: March 4, 1971 (age 55)
- Party: Democratic
- Education: University of Virginia (BA, JD)

Michael D'Agostino (born March 4, 1971) is an American politician who served in the Connecticut House of Representatives from the 91st district from 2013 to 2025.
