= Susan Johnson (politician) =

American politician

Member of the Connecticut House of Representatives from the 49th district
- Incumbent
- Assumed office January 7, 2009
- Preceded by: Walter Pawelkiewicz

Personal details
- Born: Bangor, Maine, U.S.
- Party: Democratic
- Education: Manchester Community College (AS); Eastern Connecticut State University (BA); Western New England University School of Law (JD)

Susan Johnson is an American Democratic Party politician currently serving as a member of the Connecticut House of Representatives from the 49th district, which encompasses part of Windham, since 2009. Johnson was first elected in 2008 and currently serves as a member of the House's Housing Committee, Appropriations Committee, and Education Committee.
