= Robyn Porter =

American politician

Member of the Connecticut House of Representatives from the 94th district
- In office April 28, 2014 – January 8, 2025
- Preceded by: Gary Winfield
- Succeeded by: Steven Winter

Personal details
- Born: July 1, 1966 (age 60) New York City, New York, U.S.
- Party: Democratic
- Education: Gateway Community College (AS); Charter Oak State College (BA)

Robyn Porter (born July 1, 1966) is an American politician who served in the Connecticut House of Representatives from the 94th district from 2014 to 2025. Porter has tackled pay disparity concerns, including leading a 14-hour debate that resulted in a minimum wage increase to $15 by 2023 and successfully lead the charge in implementing Connecticut's Family Medical Leave Program. She has also written and sponsored legislation to strengthen female pay equity laws and expand protections for domestic abuse victims.
