= John Santanella =

American politician (born 1967)

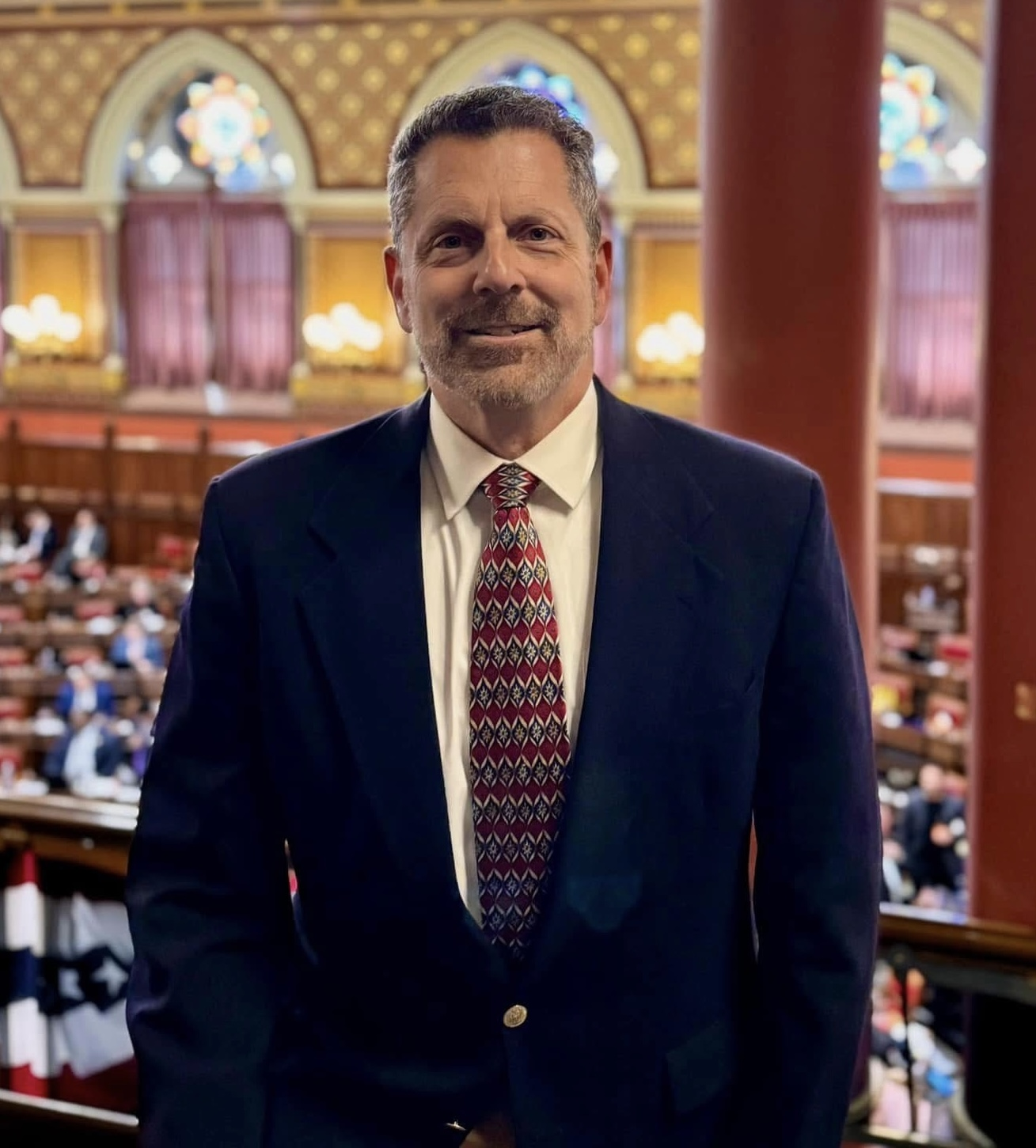

Member of the Connecticut House of Representatives from the 58th district
- Incumbent
- Assumed office January 8, 2025
- Preceded by: Tom Arnone

Enfield Town Councilor from the 2nd District
- Incumbent
- Assumed office November 8, 2021

Personal details
- Born: May 1, 1967 (age 59)
- Party: Democratic
- Education: Political Science (BA), Boston College, Marketing and Finance (MBA), Boston College

John Santanella (born May 1, 1967) is a member of the Connecticut House of Representatives, representing the 58th district, taking office in 2025. Santanella, also serves as a member of the Enfield Town Council representing the 2nd District, since 2021, and currently serves as Deputy Mayor.

== Early life and career ==
Santanella was raised in Enfield, Connecticut, where he attended Enfield Street School, John F. Kennedy Middle School, and Enfield High School. He attended Boston College, graduating in 1990, and later received a Master of Business Administration in marketing and finance from the university's Carroll School of Management in 1997.

Before entering elected office, Santanella worked in marketing, brand management and product development. His corporate career included positions with Parker Brothers and Milton Bradley, divisions of Hasbro, and Nickelodeon. He later returned to Hasbro before moving into small-business ownership and investment. The Connecticut Mirror has also reported his corporate experience with Parker Brothers, Milton Bradley and Nickelodeon.

== Political career ==
=== Enfield Town Council ===
Santanella was first elected to the Enfield Town Council from the town's Second District in November 2021. He received 759 votes, or 58.8 percent, defeating Republican Kelly Hemmeler. He was reelected in 2023, defeating Hemmeler by a vote of 646 to 636.

During his tenure on the council, Santanella focused on education, economic development and municipal fiscal issues. He supported the referendum for construction of Enfield's public safety complex, the distribution of federal American Rescue Plan Act funds to local small businesses and nonprofit organizations, and changes to the town's food-truck ordinance.

Santanella also advocated for redevelopment of the Enfield Square property and for housing and transit-oriented development in the Thompsonville section of Enfield. During his 2024 campaign for the state House, he identified both projects as priorities for securing additional state investment.

In May 2022, Santanella introduced a resolution providing for the display of the Pride flag at Enfield Town Hall during Pride Month.

Following the 2025 municipal election, Santanella was selected to serve as deputy mayor of Enfield.

=== Connecticut House of Representatives ===
In 2024, Santanella sought the Democratic nomination for the Connecticut House of Representatives from the 58th district. In the August 13 Democratic primary, he defeated former state representative David Alexander, receiving 704 votes, or 76.7 percent, to Alexander's 214 votes.

In the November 2024 general election, Santanella defeated Republican Robert Hendrickson, receiving 5,711 votes, or 56.8 percent, to Hendrickson's 4,348 votes. He succeeded Democratic representative Tom Arnone and took office on January 8, 2025.

During his first term, Santanella served on the General Assembly's Commerce Committee, Planning and Development Committee, and Public Safety and Security Committee.

==== Enfield economic development and state funding ====
Early in his first term, Santanella advocated for state funding for the redevelopment of Enfield Square, a proposed mixed-use redevelopment of the town's declining shopping mall. In March 2025, Connecticut's Community Investment Fund approved $10 million for the project. Santanella had advocated for the application with state economic-development officials and legislators and organized legislative support for the funding request.

The grant was intended to support redevelopment of the mall property into a mixed-use project incorporating residential, retail and recreational uses. Santanella said the redevelopment would return underutilized property to the town's tax base while creating construction and permanent jobs.

Santanella also continued to advocate for housing and transit-oriented development in Enfield, particularly redevelopment efforts in the Thompsonville neighborhood.

==== Education ====
Education funding and school modernization have been among Santanella's stated legislative priorities. As a legislator and town councilor, he supported Enfield's school modernization effort and advocated for additional state support for the town's public schools. In 2026, as Enfield considered a major elementary-school modernization and bonding proposal, Santanella argued for continuing the town's multiyear effort to replace or modernize its aging elementary-school facilities.

During the 2026 legislative session, Santanella voted for legislation establishing statewide restrictions on student cellphone use during the school day and supported the state budget, which included additional education and special-education funding.

=== 2026 Democratic primary ===
Santanella sought reelection to the 58th district in 2026 and faced attorney Thomas Tyler for the Democratic nomination. Tyler submitted petition signatures to qualify for a primary, but Santanella challenged the validity of the petitions because the petition forms had been issued by Enfield's registrar of voters four days earlier than permitted under state law.

Connecticut Superior Court Judge Stuart Rosen initially ruled that Tyler had not qualified for the primary. The court found that the Connecticut Secretary of the State's office had provided erroneous information in its training and election calendar concerning the dates on which the petitions could be issued. On July 30, 2026, the Connecticut Supreme Court reversed the Superior Court decision and ordered that a special Democratic primary be held.

The special primary was held on September 1, 2026. Santanella defeated Tyler with approximately 83 percent of the vote, securing the Democratic nomination for another term representing the 58th district.

== Electoral history ==
=== 2021 ===
General Election: Enfield Town Council, District 2 Election, 2021
Party	Candidate	Votes	%
Democratic	John Santanella	759	58.746%
Republican	Kelly Hemmeler	533	41.254%
Total votes		1,292	100.00%

=== 2023 ===
General Election: Enfield Town Council, District 2 Election, 2023
Party	Candidate	Votes	%
Democratic	John Santanella	646	50.39%
Republican	Kelly Hemmeler	636	49.61%
Total votes		1,282	100.00%

=== 2024 ===
Democratic primary: Connecticut's 58th House of Representatives
Party	Candidate	Votes	%
Democratic	John Santanella	704	76.688%
Democratic	David Alexander	214	23.312%
Total votes		918	100.00%

=== 2024 ===
General Election: Connecticut's 58th House of Representatives
Party	Candidate	Votes	%
Democratic	John Santanella	5,389	53.57%
Republican	Robert Hendrickson	4,348	43.22%
Independent Party	John Santanella	322	3.20%
Total votes		10,059	100.00%

=== 2025 ===
General Election: Enfield Town Council, District 2, 2025
Party	Candidate	Votes	%
Democratic	John Santanella	954	65.20
Republican	Robert Gillespie	509	34.79
Total votes		1,469	100.00%

=== 2026 ===
Democratic Primary: Connecticut's 58th House District
Party	Candidate	Votes	%
Democratic	John Santanella	878	83
Democratic	Thomas J. Tyler	174	17
Total votes		1,045	100.00%

General Election: Connecticut's 58th House of Representatives
Party	Candidate	Votes	%
Democratic	John Santanella	4,235	57.09
Republican	Marie Pyznar	2,964	39.96
Independent Party	John Santanella	219	2.95
Total votes		7,418	100

== Career and Professional Life ==
An American entrepreneur and former corporate branding and marketing executive, best known as the founder and chief executive officer of Roebuck Investment Corporation. His career spans leadership roles in global brand management, consumer products, entertainment licensing, and small-business development.

Santanella began his professional career at Hasbro, Inc., where he held a series of ascending roles from Associate Global Brand Manager to Vice President of Global Brand Marketing and Strategy. Between 1997 and 2005, he oversaw major brands within Hasbro’s Milton Bradley division, directing marketing and product development for a portfolio that generated approximately $350 million in annual revenue. His work included partnerships with major entertainment companies such as Disney, Lucasfilm, Warner Bros., and Fox. During this period, he launched several high-performing products, including Twister Moves and the first Disney co-branded edition of Monopoly, and helped drive substantial incremental revenue for the company’s classic games portfolio.

After a year as Vice President of Marketing at Educate Inc./Sylvan Learning Centers (2005–2006), Santanella joined Nickelodeon as Vice President of Global Toys and Inventor Relations. There, he managed relationships with major licensing partners and contributed to the development and retail success of products tied to properties such as Dora the Explorer, Diego, Backyardigans, and Ni Hao Kai-Lan. His work generated significant incremental revenue and included the launch of Dora the Explorer Girls.

Santanella returned to Hasbro in 2008 as Vice President of Global Brand Marketing and Strategy, where he helped integrate entertainment into the company’s global brand framework. He directed a team focused on preschool entertainment brands within the Playskool division and secured a ten-year licensing agreement with Sesame Workshop for the Sesame Street brand, adding an estimated $150 million in annual revenue to Hasbro’s portfolio.

In 2011, after more than a decade in corporate brand leadership, Santanella founded Roebuck Investment Corporation, an investment and operating company based in Connecticut. Following an evaluation of multiple business opportunities, he entered the men’s grooming sector by acquiring and operating franchised locations of Roosters Men’s Grooming Center. Under his leadership, the company expanded to four locations with a staff of more than 40 employees. His first location reached break-even within eight weeks of opening and went on to become the top-performing store in the franchise system, earning several corporate awards.

In 2021, Santanella became the principal investor and co-founder of District Biscuit Company (https://www.districtbiscuitco.com/).

Santanella has also held an academic appointment as an adjunct professor of business at Bryant University from 2011 to 2014.
