= Connecticut's 58th House of Representatives district =

American legislative district

Connecticut's 58th State House of Representatives district
Representative
John Santanella; D

Connecticut's 58th House of Representatives district is an American legislative district, which elects one member of the Connecticut House of Representatives. Its current representative is Democrat John Santanella. The district consists of part of the town of Enfield, Connecticut, including Enfield's Thompsonville neighborhood.

== List of representatives ==
List of Representatives from Connecticut's 58th State House District
Representative	Party	Years	District home	Note
Richard J. Duda	Democratic	1967–1973	Griswold	Seat created
John Morrison	Democratic	1973–1981	Enfield	
Frederick A. Gelsi	Democratic	1981–1999	Enfield	
Kathleen Tallarita	Democratic	1999–2013	Enfield	
David J. Alexander	Democratic	2013–2017	Enfield	Lost Reelection
Greg Stokes	Republican	2017–2019	Enfield	Lost Reelection
Tom Arnone	Democratic	2019–2025	Enfield	
John Santanella	Democratic	2025–present	Enfield	

== Recent elections ==
State Election 2024: House District 58
Party	Candidate	Votes	%	±%
Democratic	John Santanella	5,711	56.8	
Republican	Robert Hendrickson	4,348	43.2	
Turnout		10,059		
Democratic hold		Swing		

State Election 2022: House District 58
Party	Candidate	Votes	%	±%
Democratic	Thomas Arnone	3,850	53.6	
Republican	Robert Hendrickson	3,336	46.4	
Turnout		7,186		
Democratic hold		Swing		

State Election 2020: House District 58
Party	Candidate	Votes	%	±%
Democratic	Thomas Arnone	5,992	56.0	
Republican	Mary Ann Turner	4,711	44.0	
Turnout		10,703		
Democratic hold		Swing		

State Election 2018: House District 58
Party	Candidate	Votes	%	±%
Democratic	Thomas Arnone	3,995	53.60	
Republican	Greg Stokes	3,461	46.40	
Turnout		7,456		
Democratic gain from Republican		Swing		

State Election 2016: House District 58
Party	Candidate	Votes	%	±%
Republican	Greg Stokes	5,095	53.60	
Democratic	David Alexander	4,410	46.40	
Turnout		9,505		
Republican gain from Democratic		Swing		

State Election 2014: House District 58
Party	Candidate	Votes	%	±%
Democratic	David Alexander	3,199	51.4	
Republican	Tom Kienzler	2,612	42.00	
Turnout		6,218		
Democratic hold		Swing		

State Election 2012: House District 58
Party	Candidate	Votes	%	±%
Democratic	David Alexander	5,572	63.2	
Republican	Tom Sirad	3,245	36.8	
Turnout		8,817		
Democratic hold		Swing		

State Election 2010: House District 58
Party	Candidate	Votes	%	±%
Democratic	Kathleen Tallarita	3,724	59.1	
Republican	Tom Sirard	2,581	40.9	
Majority		1,143		
Turnout		6,305		
Democratic hold		Swing		

State Election 2008: House District 58
Party	Candidate	Votes	%	±%
Democratic	Kathleen Tallarita	5,995	67.28	−0.07
Republican	Susan Lavelli-Hozempa	2,915	32.72	+0.07
Majority		3,080	34.6	−0.1
Turnout		8,910		
Democratic hold		Swing	-0.07	

State Election 2006: House District 58
Party	Candidate	Votes	%	±%
Democratic	Kathleen Tallarita	4,317	67.35	+0.8
Republican	Susan Lavelli-Hozempa	2,093	32.65	−0.8
Majority		2,224	34.7	+5.0
Turnout		6,410		
Democratic hold		Swing	+0.8	

State Election 2004: House District 58
Party	Candidate	Votes	%	±%
Democratic	Kathleen Tallarita	5,791	66.5	−33.5
Republican	Gregory T. Stokes, Sr.	2,916	33.5	+33.5
Majority		2,875	33.0	−67.0
Turnout		8,707		
Democratic hold		Swing	-33.5	

State Election 2002: House District 58
Party	Candidate	Votes	%	±%
Democratic	Kathleen Tallarita	4,003	100.0	+0.0
Majority		4,003	100.0	+0.0
Turnout		4,003		
Democratic hold		Swing	+0.0	

State Election 2000: House District 58
Party	Candidate	Votes	%	±%
Democratic	Kathleen Tallarita	4,626	100.0	+43.2
Majority		4,626	100.0	+86.4
Turnout		4,626		
Democratic hold		Swing	+43.2	

State Election 1998: House District 58
Party	Candidate	Votes	%	±%
Democratic	Kathleen Tallarita	2,828	56.8	
Republican	Michael S. Ludwick	2,152	43.2	
Majority		676	13.6	
Turnout		4,980		
Democratic hold		Swing		
