= Connecticut's 69th House of Representatives district =

American legislative district

Connecticut's 69th State House of Representatives district
Representative
| Jason Buchsbaum; R |

Connecticut's 69th House of Representatives district elects one member of the Connecticut House of Representatives. It consists of the towns of Bridgewater, Roxbury, Washington, and parts of Southbury. It has been represented by Republican Jason Buchsbaum since 2025.

== List of representatives ==
List of representatives from Connecticut's 69th State House district
| Representative | Party | Years | District home | Note |
|---|---|---|---|---|
| Rufus C. Rose | Republican | 1967–1973 | Waterford | Seat created |
| Eloise Green | Republican | 1973–1979 | Southbury | |
| William F. Rogers III | Republican | 1979–1981 | Southbury | |
| Carol Herskowitz | Republican | 1981–1989 | Southbury | |
| Arthur J. O'Neill | Republican | 1989–2021 | Southbury | |
| Cindy Harrison | Republican | 2021–2025 | Southbury | |
| Jason Buchsbaum | Republican | 2025– | Southbury | |

== Recent elections ==
=== 2020 ===
2020 Connecticut State House of Representatives election, District 69
| Party | Candidate | Votes | % |
|---|---|---|---|
| Republican | Cindy Harrison | 7,972 | 51.55 |
| Democratic | Michele Zommer | 7,493 | 48.45 |
| Total votes | | 15,465 | 100.00 |
| Republican hold | | | |

=== 2018 ===
2018 Connecticut House of Representatives election, District 69
| Party | Candidate | Votes | % |
|---|---|---|---|
| Republican | Arthur O'Neill (Incumbent) | 7,085 | 59.9 |
| Democratic | Greg Cava | 4,745 | 40.1 |
| Total votes | | 11,830 | 100.00 |
| Republican hold | | | |

=== 2016 ===
2018 Connecticut House of Representatives election, District 69
| Party | Candidate | Votes | % |
|---|---|---|---|
| Republican | Arthur O'Neill (Incumbent) | 9,882 | 100.00 |
| Total votes | | 9,882 | 100.00 |
| Republican hold | | | |

=== 2014 ===
2014 Connecticut House of Representatives election, District 69
| Party | Candidate | Votes | % |
|---|---|---|---|
| Republican | Arthur O'Neill (Incumbent) | 7,179 | 100.00 |
| Total votes | | 7,179 | 100.00 |
| Republican hold | | | |

=== 2012 ===
2012 Connecticut House of Representatives election, District 69
| Party | Candidate | Votes | % |
|---|---|---|---|
| Republican | Arthur O'Neill (Incumbent) | 9,028 | 100.00 |
| Total votes | | 9,028 | 100.00 |
| Republican hold | | | |
