= Connecticut's 75th House of Representatives district =

American legislative district

Connecticut's 75th State House of Representatives district
Representative
Geraldo Reyes; D

Connecticut's 75th House of Representatives district elects one member of the Connecticut House of Representatives. It encompasses parts of Waterbury and has been represented by Democrat Geraldo Reyes since 2016.

== List of representatives ==
List of Representatives from Connecticut's 75th State House District
Representative	Party	Years	District home	Note
Peter W. Gillies	Democratic	1967–1973	Middletown	Seat created
William J. Scully Jr.	Democratic	1973–1987	Waterbury	
Thomas F. Conway	Democratic	1987–2005	Waterbury	
David Aldarondo	Democratic	2005–2013	Waterbury	
Victor Cuevas	Democratic	2013–2016	Waterbury	Resigned
Geraldo Reyes	Democratic	2016–	Waterbury	Elected in special election

== Recent elections ==
=== 2026 ===
2026 Connecticut State House of Representatives election, District 75
Party	Candidate	Votes	%
Democratic	Geraldo Reyes Jr. (Incumbent)	TBD	TBD
Republican	Faithalee Goclowski	TBD	TBD
	Total Votes	TBD	TBD
Results: TBD	Winner: TBD	TBD	TBD

=== 2024 ===
2024 Connecticut State House of Representatives election, District 75
Party	Candidate	Votes	%
Democratic	Geraldo Reyes Jr. (Incumbent) Unopposed*	2,848	100.0
	Total Votes	2,848	100.0
Democratic Hold	Winner: Geraldo Reyes Jr. (Incumbent)	2,848	100.0

=== 2022 ===
2022 Connecticut State House of Representatives election, District 75
Party	Candidate	Votes	%
Democratic	Geraldo Reyes Jr. (Incumbent) Unopposed*	1,682	100.0
	Total Votes	1,682	100.0
Democratic Hold	Winner: Geraldo Reyes Jr. (Incumbent)	1,682	100.0

=== 2020 ===
2020 Connecticut State House of Representatives election, District 75
Party	Candidate	Votes	%
Democratic	Geraldo Reyes Jr. (incumbent)	3,542	100.00
Democratic hold			

=== 2018 ===
2018 Connecticut House of Representatives election, District 75
Party	Candidate	Votes	%
Democratic	Geraldo Reyes (Incumbent)	2,491	91.1
Independent Party	Ted Derouin	243	8.9
Total votes		2,734	100.00
Democratic hold			

=== 2016 ===
2016 Connecticut House of Representatives election, District 75
Party	Candidate	Votes	%
Democratic	Geraldo Reyes (Incumbent)	3,282	75.19
Republican	Raymond Work	903	20.69
Independent Party	Ted Derouin	180	4.12
Total votes		4,365	100.00
Democratic hold			

=== 2014 ===
2014 Connecticut House of Representatives election, District 75
Party	Candidate	Votes	%
Democratic	Victor Cuevas (Incumbent)	1,693	81.0
Independent Party	John F. Alseph Jr.	396	19.0
Total votes		2,089	100.00
Democratic hold			

=== 2012 ===
2012 Connecticut House of Representatives election, District 75
Party	Candidate	Votes	%
Democratic	Victor Cuevas	3,305	80.1
Republican	John F. Alseph Jr.	819	19.9
Total votes		4,124	100.00
Democratic hold			
