= Larry Butler (Connecticut politician) =

American politician

Member of the Connecticut House of Representatives from the 72nd district
- Incumbent
- Assumed office January 3, 2007
- Preceded by: Reginald Beamon

Personal details
- Born: 1954 (age 71–72) Waterbury, Connecticut, U.S.
- Party: Democratic
- Spouse: Jacqueline
- Children: 2
- Education: Central Connecticut State University (BA); Computer Processing Institute

Larry B. Butler (born 1954) is an American politician serving as a member of the Connecticut House of Representatives from the 72nd district. He assumed office in 2007.

== Early life and education ==
Butler was born and raised in Waterbury, Connecticut. He studied political science at Central Connecticut State University for two years and also attended the Computer Processing Institute.

== Career ==
Prior to entering politics, Butler worked as a software engineer. He served as a member of the Waterbury Board of Aldermen from 1997 to 2006. He was elected to the Connecticut House of Representatives in November 2006 and assumed office in 2007. During the 2017 legislative session, Butler served as co-chair of the House Housing Committee. He is also vice chair of the National Black Caucus of State Legislators for the first region.
