= Jay Case =

American politician

Member of the Connecticut House of Representatives from the 63rd district
- Incumbent
- Assumed office January 9, 2013
- Preceded by: John Rigby

Personal details
- Born: October 10, 1970 (age 55)
- Party: Republican

Jay Case (born October 10, 1970) is an American politician who has served in the Connecticut House of Representatives from the 63rd district since 2013.
