= Connecticut's 87th House of Representatives district =

American legislative district

Connecticut's 87th State House of Representatives district
Representative
Dave Yaccarino; R

Connecticut's 87th House of Representatives district elects one member of the Connecticut House of Representatives. Its current representative is Dave Yaccarino. The district consists of the town of North Haven.

== List of representatives ==
List of Representatives from Connecticut's 87th State House District
Representative	Party	Years	District home	Note
James T. Healey	Democratic	1967–1973	Waterbury	Seat created
Albert W. Cretella Jr.	Republican	1973–1975	North Haven	
Paul C. DeMennato	Democratic	1975–1977	North Haven	
Paul D. Abercrombie	Republican	1977–1989	North Haven	
William V. Gambardella	Democratic	1989–1993	North Haven	
Curtis D. Andrews Jr.	Republican	1993–1997	Hamden	
Steve Fontana	Democratic	1997–2011	North Haven	
Dave Yaccarino	Republican	2011–	North Haven	

== Recent elections ==
State Election 2024: House District 87
Party	Candidate	Votes	%	±%
Democratic	Kieran Ahern	4,448	30%	
Republican	Dave Yaccarino	10,058	69%	

State Election 2022: House District 87
Party	Candidate	Votes	%	±%
Republican	Dave Yaccarino	8,846	100%	

State Election 2020: House District 87
Party	Candidate	Votes	%	±%
Democratic	Kathy Grant	4,805	32%	
Republican	Dave Yaccarino	10,375	68%	

State Election 2018: House District 87
Party	Candidate	Votes	%	±%
Democratic	Theresa Ranciato-Viele	4,308	36%	
Republican	Dave Yaccarino	7,772	64%	

State Election 2016: House District 87
Party	Candidate	Votes	%	±%
Democratic	Steve Gifford	3,331	25.4%	
Republican	Dave Yaccarino	9,765	74.6%	

State Election 2014: House District 87
Party	Candidate	Votes	%	±%
Democratic	Alden Mead	2,523	27.2%	
Republican	Dave Yaccarino	6,012	64.8%	

State Election 2012: House District 87
Party	Candidate	Votes	%	±%
Republican	Dave Yaccarino	9,151	100%	

State Election 2010: House District 87
Party	Candidate	Votes	%	±%
Democratic	Steve Fontana	4,722	46.3%	
Republican	Dave Yaccarino	5,486	53.7%	

State Election 2008: House District 87
Party	Candidate	Votes	%	±%
Democratic	Steve Fontana	7,898	62%	
Republican	Veronica Kivela	4,836	38%	

State Election 2006: House District 87
Party	Candidate	Votes	%	±%
Democratic	Steve Fontana	6,183		
Republican	Laurie-Jean Hannon	2,989		

State Election 2004: House District 87
Party	Candidate	Votes	%	±%
Democratic	Steve Fontana	7,533		
Republican	Laurie-Jean Hannon	4,215		

State Election 2002: House District 87
Party	Candidate	Votes	%	±%
Democratic	Steve Fontana	5,056		
Republican	Michael O. Peterson	3,723		

State Election 2000: House District 87
Party	Candidate	Votes	%	±%
Democratic	Steve Fontana	7,242		
Republican	E. Richard Wilson	4,291		

State Election 1998: House District 87
Party	Candidate	Votes	%	±%
Democratic	Steve Fontana	4,952		
Republican	Charles DeMartino	3,346		

State Election 1996: House District 87
Party	Candidate	Votes	%	±%
Democratic	Steve Fontana	5,975		
Republican	Curt Andrews	4,838		

State Election 1994: House District 87
Party	Candidate	Votes	%	±%
Democratic	Steve Fontana	4,401		
Republican	Curt Andrews	4,574		

State Election 1992: House District 87
Party	Candidate	Votes	%	±%
Democratic	Faye K. Clarke	5,246		
Republican	Curt Andrews	5,803		

State Election 1990: House District 87
Party	Candidate	Votes	%	±%
Democratic	William Gambardella	4,954		
Republican	Lewis Borrelli	3,760		

State Election 1988: House District 87
Party	Candidate	Votes	%	±%
Democratic	William Gambardella	5,235		
Republican	Paul Abercrombie	5,194		

State Election 1986: House District 87
Party	Candidate	Votes	%	±%
Democratic	Sally J. Buemi	3.772		
Republican	Paul Abercrombie	4,110		

State Election 1984: House District 87
Party	Candidate	Votes	%	±%
Democratic	Bessie B. Phillips	4,869		
Republican	Paul Abercrombie	6,592		

State Election 1982: House District 87
Party	Candidate	Votes	%	±%
Democratic	John P. McManus	4,205		
Republican	Paul Abercrombie	4,663		
