= Kara Rochelle =

American politician from Connecticut

Member of the Connecticut House of Representatives from the 104th district
- Incumbent
- Assumed office January 9, 2019
- Preceded by: Linda Gentile

Personal details
- Born: March 29, 1983 (age 43)
- Party: Democratic
- Education: Fordham University (BA)
- Website: https://www.housedems.ct.gov/Rochelle

Kara Elise Rochelle (born March 29, 1983) is an American politician who is a member of the Connecticut House of Representatives from the 104th district in New Haven County. She is the Vice Chair of the Housing Committee, and serves as a member to the Higher Education and Employment Advancement and Commerce Committees.

Rochelle says her background influenced her focus on labor and family-related policy. Her father, Al Rochelle, was a line worker at Sikorsky Aircraft a volunteer fire chief. Her mother, Diane, operated a daycare center.

Rochelle graduated from Fordham University and lives in Ansonia.

== Electoral history ==
=== 2018 Election ===
Connecticut's 104th State House District Results, 2018
Party	Candidate	Votes	%
Democratic	Kara Rochelle	3,785	52.8%
Working Families	Kara Rochelle	345	4.8%
Total	Kara Rochelle	4,130	56.9%
Republican	Joseph Jaumann	3,002	41.4%
Independent Party	Joseph Jaumann	121	1.7%
Total	Joseph Jaumann	3,123	43.1%
Total votes		7,253	100%
Democratic hold			

=== 2020 Election ===
Connecticut's 104th State House District Results, 2020
Party	Candidate	Votes	%
Democratic	Kara Rochelle	5,346	53.9%
Independent Party	Kara Rochelle	329	3.3%
Working Families	Kara Rochelle	235	2.4%
Total	Kara Rochelle	5,910	59.6%
Republican	Myra Rivers	4,004	40.4%
Total votes		9,914	100%
Democratic hold			

=== 2022 Election ===
Connecticut's 104th State House District Results, 2022
Party	Candidate	Votes	%
Democratic	Kara Rochelle	3,185	49.8%
Independent Party	Kara Rochelle	99	1.5%
Working Families	Kara Rochelle	87	1.4%
Total	Kara Rochelle	3,371	52.7%
Republican	Josh Shuart	3,022	47.3%
Total votes		6,393	100%
Democratic hold			

=== 2024 Election ===
Connecticut's 104th State House District Results, 2024
Party	Candidate	Votes	%
Democratic	Kara Rochelle	4,604	49.3%
Working Families	Kara Rochelle	438	4.7%
Total	Kara Rochelle	5,042	54.0%
Republican	David Cassetti	4,176	44.7%
Independent Party	Thomas Egan	118	1.3%
Total votes		6,393	100%
Democratic hold			
