= Geraldo Reyes =

American politician (born 1958)

Member of the Connecticut House of Representatives from the 75th district
- Incumbent
- Assumed office April 28, 2016
- Preceded by: Victor Cuevas

Personal details
- Born: 1958 (age 67–68) Waterbury, Connecticut, U.S.
- Party: Democratic
- Children: 2
- Education: Waterbury State Technical College (AS); Central Connecticut State University (BS)

Geraldo Reyes Jr. (born 1958) is an American politician serving as a member of the Connecticut House of Representatives from the 75th district. He assumed office on April 28, 2016. He was a 2024 presidential elector, pledged to cast his vote for Kamala Harris.

== Education ==
Reyes earned an Associate of Science degree in industrial technology from Waterbury State Technical College and a Bachelor of Science in industrial technology management from Central Connecticut State University.

== Career ==
From 2002 to 2010, Reyes worked as a general manager at Sargent Manufacturing. He later worked as an administrative aide to mayor Neil O'Leary. Since 2016, he has worked as a journalist and photographer for The Waterbury Observer. He was elected to the Connecticut House of Representatives and assumed office on April 28, 2016. During the 2017 legislative session, Reyes served as the vice chair of the House Commerce Committee.
