= Connecticut's 72nd House of Representatives district =

American legislative district

Connecticut's 72nd State House of Representatives district
Representative
Larry Butler; D

Connecticut's 72nd House of Representatives district elects one member of the Connecticut House of Representatives. It encompasses parts of Waterbury and has been represented by Democrat Larry Butler since 2007.

== List of representatives ==
List of Representatives from Connecticut's 72nd State House District
Representative	Party	Years	District home	Note
Robert T. Cairns	Republican	1967–1969	Madison	Seat created
Gustaf Carlson	Republican	1969–1971	Killingworth	
Philip Costello	Republican	1971–1973	Madison	
James T. Healey	Democratic	1973–1977	Waterbury	
Maurice B. Mosley	Democratic	1977–1987	Waterbury	
Reginald Beamon	Democratic	1987–2007	Waterbury	
Larry Butler	Democratic	2007–	Waterbury	

== Recent elections ==
=== 2026 ===
2026 Connecticut State House of Representatives election, District 72
Party	Candidate	Votes	%
Democratic	Larry Butler (Incumbent) Unopposed*	TBD	TBD
	Total Votes	TBD	TBD
Results: TBD	Winner: TBD	TBD	TBD

=== 2024 ===
2024 Connecticut State House of Representatives election, District 72
Party	Candidate	Votes	%
Democratic	Larry Butler (Incumbent) Unopposed*	3,486	89.7
Independent Party	Larry Butler (Incumbent) Unopposed*	400	10.3
	Total Votes	3,886	100.0
Democratic Hold	Winner: Larry Butler (Incumbent)	3,886	100.0

=== 2022 ===
2022 Connecticut State House of Representatives election, District 72
Party	Candidate	Votes	%
Democratic	Larry Butler (Incumbent)	2,145	66.04
Republican	Vernon R. Matthews	1,013	31.2
Independent Party	Larry Butler (Incumbent)	90	2.77
	Total Votes	3,248	100.0
Democratic Hold	Winner: Larry Butler (Incumbent)	2,235	68.8

=== 2020 ===
2020 Connecticut State House of Representatives election, District 72
Party	Candidate	Votes	%
Democratic	Larry Butler (incumbent)	4,269	69.18
Republican	Vernon R. Matthews	1,668	27.03
Independent Party	Larry Butler (incumbent)	234	3.79
Total votes		6,171	100.00
Democratic hold			

=== 2018 ===
2018 Connecticut House of Representatives election, District 72
Party	Candidate	Votes	%
Democratic	Larry Butler (Incumbent)	3,362	74.1
Republican	Michael Cervillino	1,176	25.9
Total votes		4,538	100.00
Democratic hold			

=== 2016 ===
2016 Connecticut House of Representatives election, District 72
Party	Candidate	Votes	%
Democratic	Larry Butler (Incumbent)	4,117	80.1
Independent Party	Vernon Matthews	655	12.74
Independent Party	Richard J. Cam	368	7.16
Total votes		5,140	100.00
Democratic hold			

=== 2014 ===
2014 Connecticut House of Representatives election, District 72
Party	Candidate	Votes	%
Democratic	Larry Butler (Incumbent)	2,301	66.5
Republican	Ruben Rodriguez	936	27.1
Independent Party	Ruben Rodriguez	145	4.2
Independent Party	Richard J. Cam	77	2.2
Total votes		3,459	100.00
Democratic hold			

=== 2012 ===
2012 Connecticut House of Representatives election, District 72
Party	Candidate	Votes	%
Democratic	Larry Butler (Incumbent)	4,217	78.2
Republican	Mike Stango	1,176	21.8
Total votes		5,393	100.00
Democratic hold			
