= Dave Yaccarino =

American politician

David Yaccarino
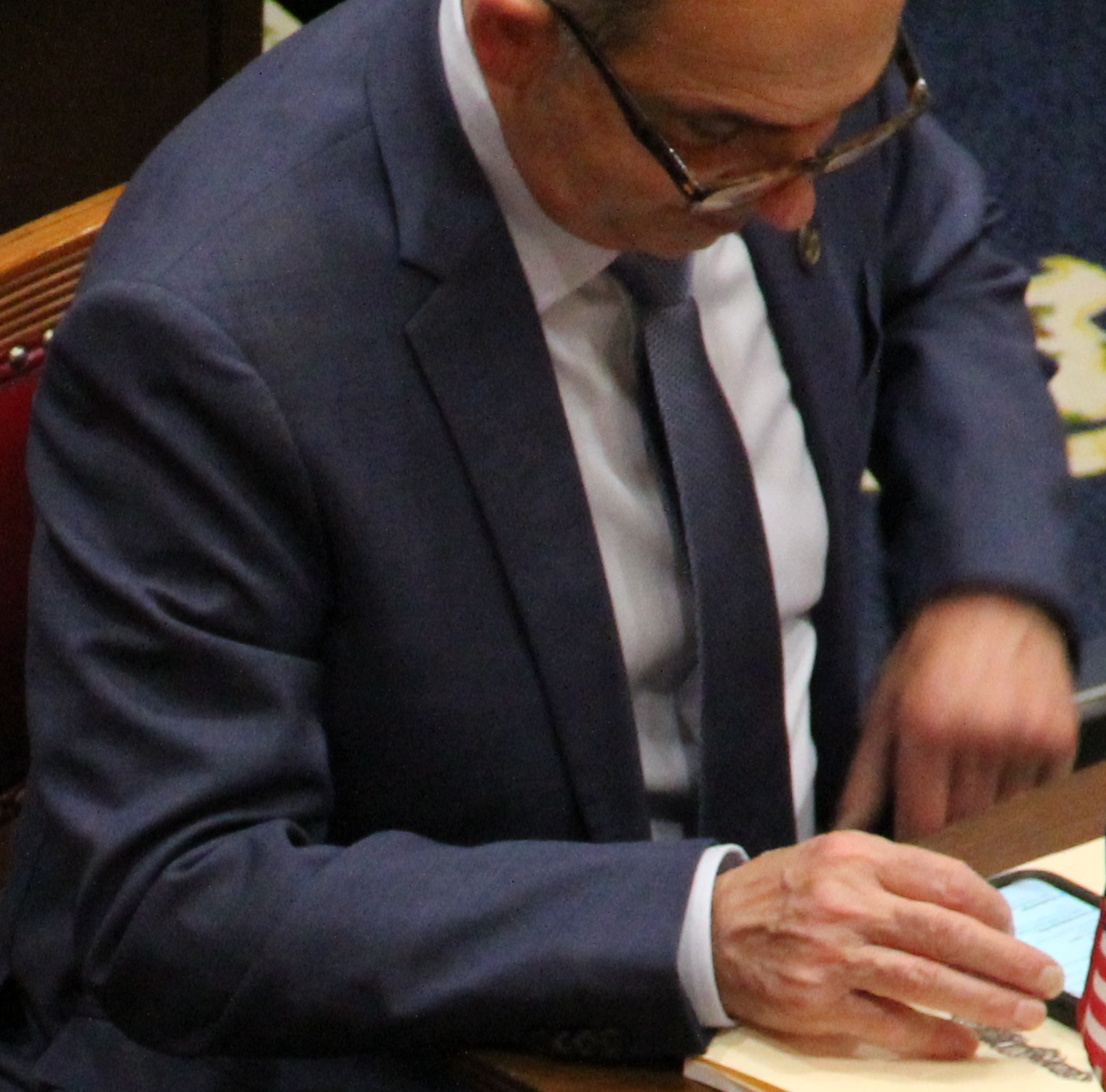
- Yaccarino in 2023

Member of the Connecticut House of Representatives from the 87th district
- Incumbent
- Assumed office January 2011
- Preceded by: Steve Fontana

Personal details
- Born: October 31, 1958 (age 67) New Haven, Connecticut, U.S.
- Education: Gateway Community College (AA)

Dave Yaccarino is a Republican member of the Connecticut House of Representatives. He was first elected to the legislature in 2010, and represents the 87th district. Yaccarino lives in North Haven, Connecticut.

== Education and personal life ==
Yaccarino holds an associate degree in Liberal Sciences from Gateway Community College, where he was inducted into the Hall of Fame and taught a U.S. History course. He is a former supply technician in the U.S. Navy Reserve. Since 1991, Yaccarino has owned DJ's Sports Collectibles and Comics in North Haven. He has three children.

== Political career ==
Yaccarino was elected to the Connecticut House of Representatives in 2010. He was reelected without an opponent in 2012. In 2014, he defeated Democrat Alden Mead for the seat. In 2016, Yaccarino's name was not included on the ballot as a Republican after he failed to sign the nominating paperwork. A Superior Court judge ordered that it be included on the ballot.

In the 2015 session, Yaccarino was one of thirteen Assistant Minority Leaders. He currently serves as the ranking Republican on the House Veterans Affairs Committee. He is also a member of the Finance, Revenue and Bonding; Public Safety and Security; and Energy and Technology Committees.

Yaccarino is a member of the North Haven Republican Town Committee.

== Political views ==
=== Education ===
Yaccarino was one of fifteen co-sponsors of HB 7102, introduced by Democratic leadership, which changed the funding formula for twenty-five school building projects across the state. The bill passed the legislature unanimously.

=== Gun control ===
In 2013, Yaccarino voted in favor of rifle weapon legislation in the wake of the Sandy Hook Elementary School shooting. He has an A rating from the NRA Political Victory Fund.
