= Cara Pavalock-D'Amato =

American politician

Member of the Connecticut House of Representatives from the 77th district
- Incumbent
- Assumed office January 7, 2015
- Preceded by: Christopher A. Wright
- Succeeded by: DeWayne Wynn (elect)

Personal details
- Born: Cara Christine Pavalock Bristol, Connecticut, U.S.
- Party: Republican
- Spouse: Anthony D'Amato
- Children: 1
- Education: Providence College (BA); St. Thomas University (JD); Georgetown University (LLM)

Cara Christine Pavalock-D'Amato is an American attorney and politician serving as a member of the Connecticut House of Representatives from the 77th district. Elected in November 2014, she assumed office on January 7, 2015. She lost the re-election in November 2026 to DeWayne Wynn Jr, who will assume office in January 2027.

== Early life and education ==
Pavalock-D'Amato was born in Bristol, Connecticut and graduated from St. Paul Catholic High School. She earned a Bachelor of Arts degree from Providence College, a Juris Doctor from the St. Thomas University School of Law, and a Master of Laws in taxation from the Georgetown University Law Center.

== Career ==
After graduating from law school, Pavalock-D'Amato returned to Bristol and established a law firm. She was elected to the Connecticut House of Representatives in November 2014 and assumed office on January 7, 2015. Pavalock-D'Amato is the ranking member of the House Insurance and Real Estate Committee. In 2020, Cara Christine Pavalock-D'Amato apologized for leaving a profanity-laced note hanging from a mailbox after a threatening note was left on her car. Her note included the phrase, "you come at me, you better know who the f*** you’re dealing with."

On February 4, 2026, after Connecticut governor Ned Lamont criticized the U.S. Immigration and Customs Enforcement's tactics in his annual State of the State address, Pavalock-D'Amato stood up and showed the back of her blazer with the words "ICE IN". Several other House Republicans also walked out during the speech. The following day, Matt Ritter, the Speaker of the Connecticut House of Representatives, rebuked the behavior, stating that political slogans may not be shown in the House Chamber. Pavalock-D'Amato stated she had no regrets and reported receiving a threatening text message afterward.

One of the Bristol community members accused Pavalock-D'Amato of doxing when the state representative posted a photo of their family residence in response to seeing an anti-Trump flag. The person's mother and Pavalock-D'Amato argued on social media, with the latter calling her a "violent liar" and to keep "violence away from children." The affected family has reported that they have been harassed by ongoing cars that made loud honking noises late at night.

== Electoral History ==
In 2014, she won the electoral race for the 77th district in the Connecticut House of Representatives against incumbent Christopher Wright with 52.2% of the vote. She won subsequent general elections until the November 2026 midterm election when Democratic candidate DeWayne Wynn Jr. defeated her in the race, winning 55.8% of the vote.

She lost the 2026 election to DeWayne Wynn Jr, who will assume office in January 2027.
