= Connecticut's 49th House of Representatives district =

American legislative district

Connecticut's 49th State House of Representatives district
Representative
Susan Johnson; D

Connecticut's 49th House of Representatives district elects one member of the Connecticut House of Representatives. It encompasses parts of Windham and has been represented by Democrat Susan Johnson since 2009.

== List of representatives ==
List of Representatives from Connecticut's 49th State House District
Representative	Party	Years	District home	Note
Renato Calchera	Democratic	1967–1971	Stafford	Seat created
Peter F. Locke Jr.	Republican	1971–1973	Stafford	
Alan J. Mazzola	Republican	1973–1979	Windham	
Andrew J. Carey III	Democratic	1979–1987	South Windsor	
John J. Lescoe	Democratic	1987–1999	Willimantic	
Walter Pawelkiewicz	Democratic	1999–2009	Windham	
Susan Johnson	Democratic	2009–	Willimantic	

== Recent elections ==
=== 2020 ===
2020 Connecticut State House of Representatives election, District 49
Party	Candidate	Votes	%
Democratic	Susan Johnson (incumbent)	4,900	87.00
Working Families	Susan Johnson (incumbent)	732	13.00
Total votes		5,632	100.00
Democratic hold			

=== 2018 ===
2018 Connecticut House of Representatives election, District 49
Party	Candidate	Votes	%
Democratic	Susan Johnson (Incumbent)	4,904	100.0
Democratic hold			

=== 2016 ===
2016 Connecticut House of Representatives election, District 49
Party	Candidate	Votes	%
Democratic	Susan Johnson (Incumbent)	4,912	65.71
Republican	Tony Fantoli	2,563	34.29
Total votes		7,475	100.00
Democratic hold			

=== 2014 ===
2014 Connecticut House of Representatives election, District 49
Party	Candidate	Votes	%
Democratic	Susan Johnson (Incumbent)	2,758	62.7
The Bottom Line	Ernest S. Elridge	1,226	27.9
Working Families	Susan Johnson (Incumbent)	417	9.5
Total votes		4,401	100.00
Democratic hold			

=== 2012 ===
2012 Connecticut House of Representatives election, District 49
Party	Candidate	Votes	%
Democratic	Susan Johnson (Incumbent)	5,246	78.2
Republican	Harry Carboni	1,462	21.8
Total votes		6,708	100.00
Democratic hold			
