= Lezlye Zupkus =

American politician (born 1966)

Member of the Connecticut House of Representatives from the 89th district
- Incumbent
- Assumed office January 9, 2013
- Preceded by: Vickie Orsini Nardello

Personal details
- Born: Lezlye W. Zupkus; July 2, 1966 (age 60) Lambert, Mississippi, U.S.
- Party: Republican
- Children: 2
- Education: Embry-Riddle Aeronautical University (BA)

Lezlye W. Zupkus (born July 2, 1966) is an American politician currently serving in the Connecticut House of Representatives, representing the 89th district, which includes portions of Bethany, Cheshire, and all of Prospect, as a Republican.

== About ==
Born in Lambert, Mississippi, Lezlye moved to Prospect with her husband in 1993, and she has two children. Zupkus has always had an active role within the community, and was the commissioner of the Prospect Planning and Zoning board from 1998 to 2000. She is now serving her sixth term as representative, after defeating the incumbent candidate, Vickie Orsini Nardello.

Zupkus is a graduate of Embry-Riddle Aeronautical University in Daytona Beach, Florida.
