= Ronald Smoko =

American politician

Member of the Connecticut House of Representatives from the 91st district
- In office January 3, 1979 – January 6, 1993
- Preceded by: Leonard Caplan
- Succeeded by: Peter Villano
- In office January 8, 1975 – January 5, 1977
- Preceded by: Kenneth DeMatteis
- Succeeded by: Leonard Caplan

Personal details
- Party: Democratic

Ronald Smoko is an American politician who served in the Connecticut House of Representatives from the 91st district from 1975 to 1977 and from 1979 to 1993.
