= Connecticut's 77th House of Representatives district =

American legislative district

Connecticut's 77th State House of Representatives district
Representative
Cara Pavalock-D'Amato; R

Connecticut's 77th House of Representatives district elects one member of the Connecticut House of Representatives. It encompasses parts of Bristol and has been represented by Republican Cara Pavalock-D'Amato since 2015.

== List of representatives ==
List of Representatives from Connecticut's 77th State House District
Representative	Party	Years	District home	Note
Patsy Mesite	Democratic	1967–1973	Meriden	Seat created
Gardner E. Wright Jr.	Democratic	1973–1983	Bristol	
Stephen J. Duffy	Democratic	1983–1993	Bristol	
James E. White	Republican	1993–1995	Bristol	
Roger B. Michele	Democratic	1995–2007	Bristol	
Ron Burns	Republican	2007–2009	Bristol	
Christopher A. Wright	Democratic	2009–2015	Bristol	
Cara Pavalock-D'Amato	Republican	2015–	Bristol	
DeWayne Wynn	Democratic	2027 member-elect		

== Recent elections ==
=== 2024 ===
2024 Connecticut State House of Representatives election, District 77
Party	Candidate	Votes	%
Republican	Cara Pavalock-D'Amato (incumbent)	TBD	TBD
Democratic	DeWayne Wynn Jr.	TBD	TBD
Working Families	DeWayne Wynn Jr.	TBD	TBD
Total votes		TBD	TBD
To be determined hold			

=== 2020 ===
2020 Connecticut State House of Representatives election, District 77
Party	Candidate	Votes	%
Republican	Cara Pavalock-D'Amato (incumbent)	6,079	49.43
Democratic	Andrew M. Rasmussen-Tuller	5,788	47.07
Independent Party	Cara Pavalock-D'Amato (incumbent)	430	3.50
Total votes		12,297	100.00
Republican hold			

=== 2018 ===
2018 Connecticut State Senate election, District 77
Party	Candidate	Votes	%
Republican	Cara Pavalock-D'Amato (Incumbent)	4,901	52.7
Democratic	Kevin Fuller	4,396	47.3
Total votes		9,297	100.00
Republican hold			

=== 2016 ===
2016 Connecticut House of Representatives election, District 77
Party	Candidate	Votes	%
Republican	Cara Pavalock-D'Amato (Incumbent)	5,782	52.8
Democratic	Laura Bartok	5,169	47.2
Total votes		10,951	100.00
Republican hold			

=== 2014 ===
2014 Connecticut House of Representative election, District 77
Party	Candidate	Votes	%
Republican	Cara Pavalock-D'Amato	3,778	48.3
Democratic	Christopher A. Wright (Incumbent)	3,747	47.9
Independent Party	Cara Pavalock-D'Amato	305	3.9
Total votes		7,830	100.00
Republican gain from Democratic			

=== 2012 ===
2012 Connecticut House of Representatives election, District 77
Party	Candidate	Votes	%
Democratic	Christopher Wright (Incumbent)	5,818	58.4
Republican	Jill Fitzgerald	4,144	41.6
Total votes		9,962	100.00
Democratic hold			
