= Connecticut's 92nd House of Representatives district =

American legislative district

Connecticut's 92nd State House of Representatives district
Representative
| Patricia Dillon; D |

Connecticut's 92nd House of Representatives district elects one member of the Connecticut House of Representatives. It encompasses parts of New Haven and has been represented by Democrat Patricia Dillon since 1985. In 2026, Eli Sabin won the Democratic primary and the general election.

== List of representatives ==
List of representatives from Connecticut's 92nd House district
| Representative | Party | Years | District home | Note |
|---|---|---|---|---|
| John D. Mahaney | Democratic | 1967–1973 | Waterbury | Seat created |
| Albert Webber | Democratic | 1973–1977 | New Haven | |
| Rosalind Berman | Republican | 1977–1985 | New Haven | |
| Patricia Dillon | Democratic | 1985–2027 | New Haven | |
| Eli Sabin | Democratic | 2027– | New Haven | |

== Recent elections ==
=== 2026 ===
2026 Connecticut State House of Representatives election, District 92
| Party | Candidate | Votes | % |
|---|---|---|---|
| Democratic | Eli Sabin (representative-elect) | 5,323 | 100.00 |
| Total votes | | 5,323 | 100.00 |
| Democratic hold | | | |

=== 2020 ===
2020 Connecticut State House of Representatives election, District 92
| Party | Candidate | Votes | % |
|---|---|---|---|
| Democratic | Patricia Dillon (incumbent) | 7,696 | 92.64 |
| Working Families | Patricia Dillon (incumbent) | 611 | 7.36 |
| Total votes | | 8,307 | 100.00 |
| Democratic hold | | | |

=== 2018 ===
2018 Connecticut House of Representatives election, District 92
| Party | Candidate | Votes | % |
|---|---|---|---|
| Democratic | Patricia Dillon (Incumbent) | 6,565 | 90.9 |
| Republican | Joshua Alan Rose | 627 | 8.7 |
| Unaffiliated | Wayne Jackson | 31 | 0.4 |
| Total votes | | 7,223 | 100.00 |
| Democratic hold | | | |

=== 2016 ===
2016 Connecticut House of Representatives election, District 92
| Party | Candidate | Votes | % |
|---|---|---|---|
| Democratic | Patricia Dillon (Incumbent) | 7,938 | 100.00 |
| Total votes | | 7,938 | 100.00 |
| Democratic hold | | | |

=== 2014 ===
2014 Connecticut House of Representatives election, District 92
| Party | Candidate | Votes | % |
|---|---|---|---|
| Democratic | Patricia Dillon (Incumbent) | 4,961 | 84.1 |
| Republican | James O'Connell | 606 | 10.3 |
| Working Families | Patricia Dillon (Incumbent) | 329 | 5.6 |
| Total votes | | 7,223 | 100.0 |
| Democratic hold | | | |

=== 2012 ===
2012 Connecticut House of Representatives election, District 92
| Party | Candidate | Votes | % |
|---|---|---|---|
| Democratic | Patricia Dillon (Incumbent) | 8,254 | 100.00 |
| Total votes | | 8,254 | 100.00 |
| Democratic hold | | | |
