= David J. Alexander =

American politician

Member of the Connecticut House of Representatives from the 58th district
- In office 2013–2017
- Succeeded by: Greg Stokes

Personal details
- Born: May 9, 1981 (age 45) Connecticut, United States
- Party: Democratic
- Education: Trinity College (BA), University of Connecticut School of Law (JD), Yale University (MBA) (Did Not Graduate), University of California, Berkeley (MPA)

Military service
- Allegiance: United States
- Branch/service: United States Marine Corps
- Years of service: 2011
- Rank: Captain

David J. Alexander (born 9 May 1981) is a former member of the Connecticut House of Representatives, representing the 58th district, from 2013 to 2017.

== Background ==
He was born in Connecticut. Upon graduating from law school, he graduated from Marine Corps Officer Candidates School and was commissioned as a 2nd lieutenant. Upon graduating from Marine Corps Basic School, he served on active duty with Marine Wing Support Squadron 172 in Okinawa, Japan and 1st Reconnaissance Battalion at Camp Pendleton, California. Upon leaving active duty in 2011, he served in the Marine Corps Reserves with 1st Battalion, 25th Marines at Fort Devens, Massachusetts from 2011 to 2014. He left the Marine Corps obtaining the rank of captain. In 2012 he challenged Kathy Tallarita, a 14-year state representative incumbent, in a Democratic Primary and defeated her by a 2-to-1 margin. Upon taking office in 2013, his comments in support of the Connecticut Gun Safety Act, as part of the state's response to the Newtown Shooting, was covered by NPR due to how he compared gun safety to weapons safety within the Marine Corps. In 2014, he was spearheaded the passage of an adoption birth certificate bill that was covered in USA Today, Reuters and the Hartford Courant due to its importance. He also was instrumental in passing a veterans jobs bill in 2014 that stands as a national model. David graduated from Trinity College, with honors, in 2003. His honors senior thesis that he wrote while a student at Trinity College focused on state and federal policies aimed at increasing voting. He graduated with a law degree from the University of Connecticut School of Law in 2006. In 2020, he earned a Masters of Public Affairs Degree from the Goldman School of Public Policy at the University of California, Berkeley. From July 2015 to June 2016, he was a student at the Yale School of Management in their MBA for Executives program. In July 2016, Yale granted Alexander a leave of absence to tend to personal issues, but Yale University declined to allow Alexander rejoin the MBA for Executives program upon the conclusion of the leave of absence. From 2002 until 2007, Alexander served on the Enfield Zoning Board of Appeals as an Alternate Member.

In 2024, he ran for his old house seat again, but lost the primary by 76.79% to 23.31% against John Santanella.

== Legal issues and altercations ==
Alexander was arrested for a DUI in 2015, leading to his removal from the position of vice chairman of the House's government and elections committee. In 2016, he was arrested on another DUI charge and removed from his committee assignments.

Later that year, Alexander was arrested for assaulting his father while intoxicated, resulting in charges of breach of peace and assault on an elderly person. This incident occurred shortly after he lost his bid for re-election.

In 2018, Alexander was arrested for an alleged intoxicated assault on his mother. Local police believed that he threw a mug at his mother, hitting her in the head and breaking both of her wrists. Alexander's mother denied this, and she stated that she injured herself by accidentally falling. He was charged with assault on an elderly person and disorderly conduct, and he pleaded guilty to breach of peace (2nd degree) as part of a plead bargain. The primary reason for this plea bargain was the fact that both Alexander's mother and father continually stated that Alexander did nothing to harm his mother. In response, the Connecticut Superior Court suspended Alexander's ability to practice law in the state for one year.

=== 2016 texts ===
During 2016, Alexander was involved in a rivalry with Republican Tim Herbst, a candidate for governor. Herbst sent a text message to Alexander containing a video clip from the film Sudden Impact of a character pointing a gun and saying "Go ahead, make my day". Alexander interpreted this as a threat and filed a formal complaint with police, who advised Herbst to have no further contact with Alexander. Herbst maintained that the text in question was not a threat.

== Electoral history ==
=== 2012 ===
Connecticut's 58th House of Representatives district election, 2012
Party	Candidate	Votes	%
Democratic	David Alexander	5,572	63.196%
Republican	Tom Sirad	214	36.803%
Total votes		8,817	100.00%

=== 2014 ===
Connecticut's 58th House of Representatives district election, 2014
Party	Candidate	Votes	%
Democratic	David Alexander	3,199	55.051%
Republican	Tom Sirad	2,612	44.949%
Total votes		5,811	100.00%

=== 2016 ===
Connecticut's 58th House of Representatives district election, 2016
Party	Candidate	Votes	%
Republican	Greg Stokes	5,095	53.603%
Democratic	David Alexander	4,410	46.397%
Total votes		9,505	100.00%

=== 2024 ===
Democratic primary: Connecticut's 58th House of Representatives district election, 2024
Party	Candidate	Votes	%
Democratic	John Santanella	704	76.688%
Democratic	David Alexander	214	23.312%
Total votes		918	100.00%
