= 2022 Connecticut House of Representatives election =

2022 Connecticut House of Representatives elections
- November 8, 2022

All 151 seats in the Connecticut House of Representatives 76 seats needed for a majority
- Turnout: 57.62% ▼
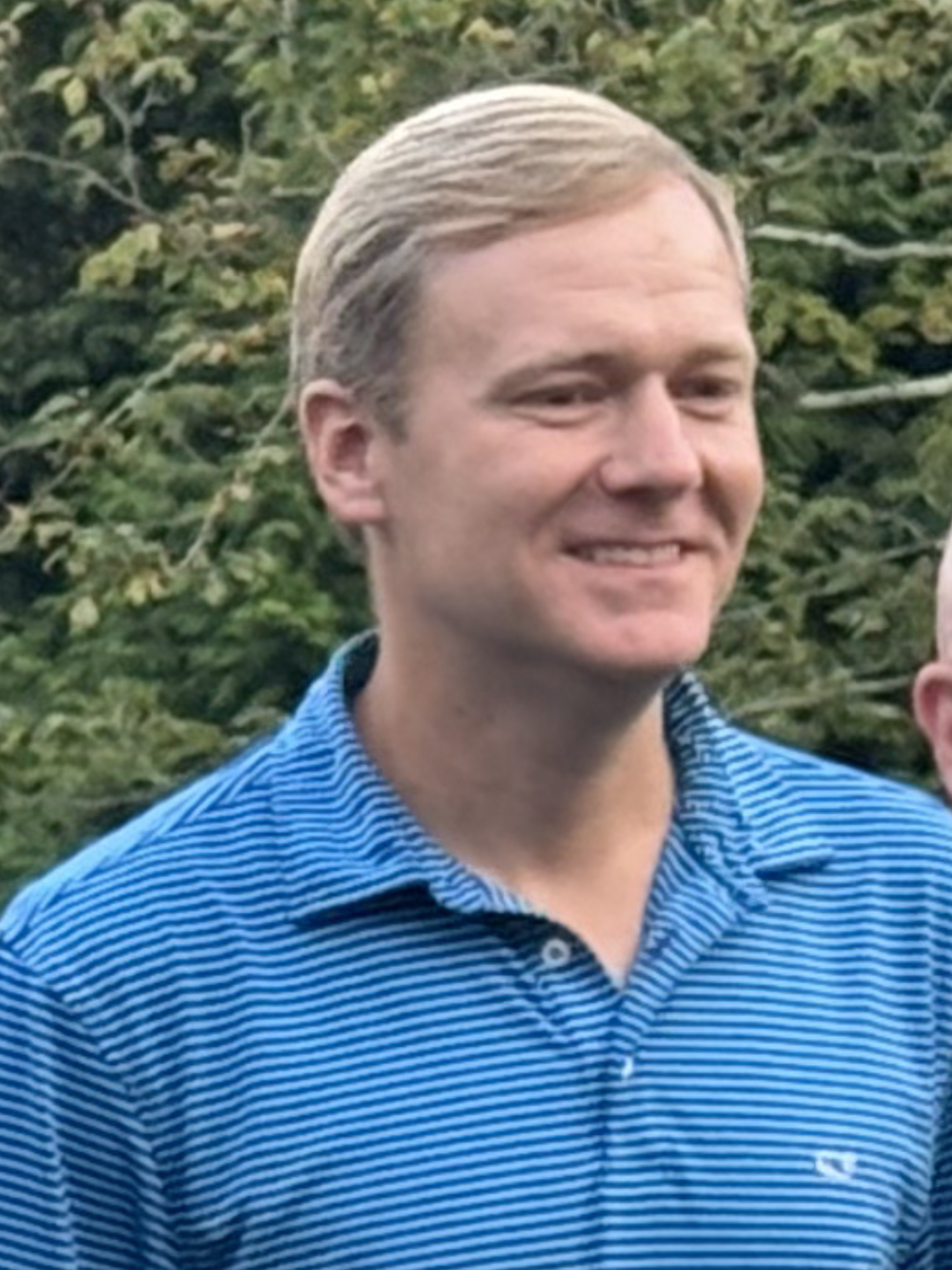

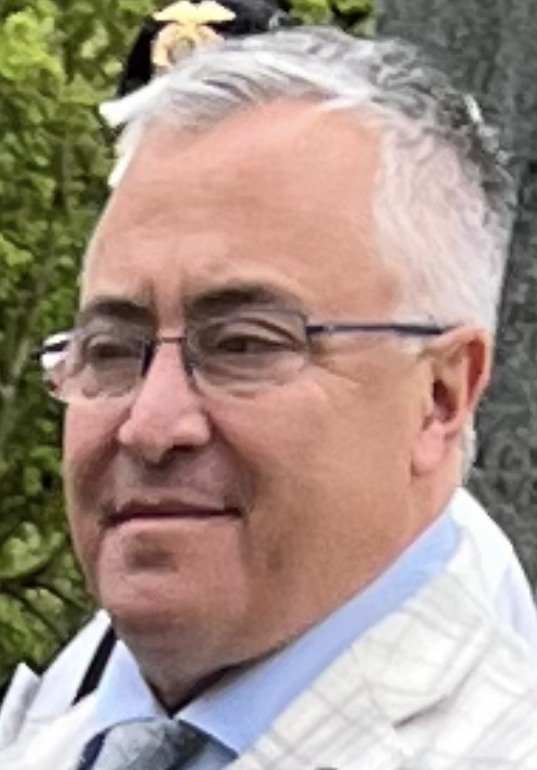
	Majority party	Minority party
Leader	Matthew Ritter	Vincent Candelora
Party	Democratic	Republican
Leader's seat	1st district	86th district
Last election	97	54
Seats before	97	54
Seats won	98	53
Seat change	▲1	▼1
Popular vote	727,440	544,387
Percentage	56.05%	41.94%
Swing	▲2.46%	▼0.25%
- Democratic gain Republican gain Democratic hold Republican hold 40–50% 50–60% 60–70% 70–80% 80–90% >90% 40–50% 50–60% 60–70% 70–80% 80–90% >90%
Speaker before election
Matthew Ritter
Democratic
Elected Speaker
Matthew Ritter
Democratic

The 2022 Connecticut House of Representatives election was held on Tuesday, November 8, 2022, to elect members to the Connecticut House of Representatives, one from each of the state's 151 General Assembly districts. The date of this the election corresponded with other elections in the state, including the U.S. Senate, U.S. House, and Connecticut State Senate.

Democrats retained control of the House of Representatives, expanding their majority by winning 98 seats to the Republicans' 53, a net gain of 1. Democrats had held a majority in the House of Representatives since 1987. They are 3 seats shy of supermajority.

== Retirements ==
23 incumbents did not seek re-election in 2022.

=== Democrats ===
1. District 16: John Hampton retired.
2. District 41: Joe de la Cruz retired.
3. District 46: Emmett Riley retired.
4. District 48: Brian Smith retired.
5. District 56: Mike Winkler retired.
6. District 79: Chris Ziogas retired.
7. District 83: Catherine Abercrombie retired.
8. District 98: Sean Scanlon retired to be elected Connecticut State Comptroller in 2022.
9. District 109: David Arconti retired.
10. District 126: Charlie Stallworth retired.
11. District 137: Chris Perone retired.
12. District 143: Stephanie Thomas retired to be elected to Connecticut Secretary of State in 2022.

=== Republicans ===
1. District 22: William Petit retired.
2. District 42: Mike France retired.
3. District 55: Robin Green retired.
4. District 66: David Wilson retired.
5. District 70: Rosa Rebimbas retired.
6. District 78: Whit Betts retired.
7. District 81: John Fusco retired.
8. District 107: Stephen Harding retired to be elected to Connecticut's 30th State Senate district in 2022.
9. District 134: Laura Devlin retired.
10. District 141: Terrie Wood retired to unsuccessfully run for Connecticut Secretary of State in 2022.
11. District 151: Harry Arora retired to unsuccessfully run for Connecticut State Treasurer in 2022.

== Predictions ==
Source	Ranking	As of
Sabato's Crystal Ball	Likely D	May 19, 2022

== Results ==
↓
98	53
Democratic	Republican

Parties	Candidates	Seats				Popular vote		
Parties	Candidates	2020	2022	±	Strength	Vote	%	Change
Democratic	136	97	98	▲1	64.90%	727,440	56.05%	▲2.44%
Republican	125	54	53	▼1	35.10%	544,387	41.94%	▼0.23%
Working Families	2 (Note: In addition, the Working Families Party of Connecticut cross-endorsed 59 candidates, all Democrats.)	0	0	Steady	0.00%	12,575	0.96%	▲0.96%
Independent Party	4 (Note: In addition, the Independent Party of Connecticut cross-endorsed 42 candidates, TBD Democrats and TBD Republicans.)	0	0	Steady	0.00%	12,223	0.94%	▲0.94%
Other parties and Write-ins	10	0	0	Steady	0.00%	1,102	0.84%	▲0.84%
Green	1	0	0	Steady	0.00%	84	0.73%	▼5.98%
Libertarian	0	0	0	Steady	0.00%	0	0.00%	▼3.82%
Total	278	151	151	0	100.00%	1,297,811	100.00%	100.00%

House seats
Democratic	64.90%
Republican	35.10%

Popular vote
Democratic	56.05%
Republican	41.94%

== Detailed results ==
=== District 1 ===
Democratic incumbent Matthew Ritter won reelection to a seventh term after running unopposed. He had represented the 1st District since 2011.

2022 Connecticut State House of Representatives election, 1st District
Party	Candidate	Votes	%
Democratic	Matthew Ritter (incumbent)	3,061	100.00%
Total votes		3,061	100.00%
Democratic hold			

=== District 2 ===
Democratic incumbent Raghib Allie-Brennan won reelection to a third term after defeating Republican candidate Jenn Lewis. Allie-Brennan was also nominated by the Working Families Party, while Lewis was also nominated by the Independent Party. Allie-Brennan had represented the 2nd District since 2019.

2022 Connecticut State House of Representatives election, 2nd District
Party	Candidate	Votes	%
Democratic	Raghib Allie-Brennan (incumbent)	4,818	52.05%
Republican	Jenn Lewis	4,118	44.49%
Working Families	Raghib Allie-Brennan (incumbent)	190	2.05%
Independent Party	Jenn Lewis	130	1.40%
Total votes		9,256	100.00%
Democratic hold			

=== District 3 ===
Democratic incumbent Minnie Gonzalez was reelected to a 14th term after running unopposed. She had represented the 3rd District since 1997.

2022 Connecticut State House of Representatives election, 3rd District
Party	Candidate	Votes	%
Democratic	Minnie Gonzalez (incumbent)	1,807	100.00%
Total votes		1,807	100.00%
Democratic hold			

=== District 4 ===
Democratic incumbent Julio Concepcion was reelected to a third full term after running unopposed. He had represented the 4th District since 2018, when he won the special election to fill the vacancy left by Democrat Angel Arce, who resigned effective April 9, 2018, due to allegations that he had sent inappropriate Facebook messages to a 16-year-old girl.

2022 Connecticut State House of Representatives election, 4th District
Party	Candidate	Votes	%
Democratic	Julio Concepcion (incumbent)	1,914	100.00%
Total votes		1,914	100.00%
Democratic hold			

=== District 5 ===
Democratic incumbent Maryam Khan was reelected to a first full term after defeating Republican candidate Charles Jackson and Petitioning candidate Elijah El-Hajj-Bey. Khan had represented the 5th District since 2022, when she won the special election to fill the vacancy left by Democrat Brandon McGee, who resigned on January 7, 2022, to work on Governor Ned Lamont's reelection campaign.

2022 Connecticut State House of Representatives election, 5th District
Party	Candidate	Votes	%
Democratic	Maryam Khan (incumbent)	4,978	75.24%
Republican	Charles Windsor Jackson, III	1,469	22.20%
Petitioning	Elijah El-Hajj-Bey	169	2.55%
Total votes		6,616	100.00%
Democratic hold			

=== District 6 ===
Democratic incumbent Edwin Vargas Jr. was reelected to a sixth term after running unopposed. Vargas was also nominated by the Working Families party. Vargas resigned on January 3, 2023, to pursue an academic post in the state university system. Vargas previously represented the district since 2013. Democrat James Sánchez was elected to succeed him on February 28, 2023.

2022 Connecticut State House of Representatives election, 6th District
Party	Candidate	Votes	%
Democratic	Edwin Vargas (incumbent)	2,465	95.06%
Working Families	Edwin Vargas (incumbent)	128	4.94%
Total votes		2,593	100.00%
Democratic hold			

=== District 7 ===
Democratic incumbent Joshua Malik Hall was reelected to a third full term after running unopposed. He had represented District 7 since 2017, when he won the special election to fill the vacancy left by Democrat Douglas McCrory, who was elected to the state senate.

2022 Connecticut State House of Representatives election, 7th District
Party	Candidate	Votes	%
Democratic	Joshua Malik Hall (incumbent)	2,903	100.00%
Total votes		2,903	100.00%
Democratic hold			

=== District 8 ===
Republican incumbent Tim Ackert was reelected to a seventh term after defeating Democratic candidate Mary Ann Hansen. Hansen was also nominated by the Working Families Party. Ackert had represented the 8th District since 2011.

2022 Connecticut State House of Representatives election, 8th District
Party	Candidate	Votes	%
Republican	Tim Ackert (incumbent)	6,936	59.84%
Total	Mary Ann M. Hansen	4,655	40.16%
Democratic	Mary Ann M. Hansen	4,493	38.76%
Working Families	Mary Ann M. Hansen	162	1.40%
Total votes		11,591	100.00%
Republican hold			

=== District 9 ===
Democratic incumbent Jason Rojas was reelected to an eighth term after defeating Republican candidate Matthew Lauf. Rojas had represented the 9th District since 2009.

2022 Connecticut State House of Representatives election, 9th District
Party	Candidate	Votes	%
Democratic	Jason Rojas (incumbent)	4,741	66.80%
Republican	Matthew Lauf	2,356	33.20%
Total votes		7,097	100.00%
Democratic hold			

=== District 10 ===
Democratic incumbent Henry Genga was reelected to a ninth term after running unopposed. He had represented the 10th District since 2007.

2022 Connecticut State House of Representatives election, 10th District
Party	Candidate	Votes	%
Democratic	Henry Genga (incumbent)	3,861	100.00%
Total votes		3,861	100.00%
Democratic hold			

=== District 11 ===
Democratic incumbent Jeffrey Currey was reelected to a fifth term after running unopposed. He had represented the 11th District since 2015.

2022 Connecticut State House of Representatives election, 11th District
Party	Candidate	Votes	%
Democratic	Jeffrey Currey (incumbent)	3,397	100.00%
Total votes		3,397	100.00%
Democratic hold			

=== District 12 ===
Democratic incumbent Geoff Luxenberg was reelected to a third term after running unopposed. He was also nominated by the Working Families Party. Luxenberg had represented the 12th District since 2019.

2022 Connecticut State House of Representatives election, 12th District
Party	Candidate	Votes	%
Democratic	Geoff Luxenberg (incumbent)	5,070	92.43%
Working Families	Geoff Luxenberg (incumbent)	415	7.57%
Total votes		5,485	100.00%
Democratic hold			

=== District 13 ===
Democratic incumbent Jason Doucette was reelected to a third term after defeating Republican candidate Donna Meier. Doucette was also nominated by the Independent Party and Working Families Party. Doucette had represented the 13th District since 2019.

2022 Connecticut State House of Representatives election, 13th District
Party	Candidate	Votes	%
Democratic	Jason Doucette (incumbent)	5,521	61.26%
Republican	Donna Meier	3,185	35.34%
Working Families	Jason Doucette (incumbent)	168	1.86%
Independent Party	Jason Doucette (incumbent)	138	1.53%
Total votes		9,012	100.00%
Democratic hold			

=== District 14 ===
Republican incumbent Tom Delnicki was reelected to a fourth term after defeating Democratic candidate Erica Evans and United Community candidate Marek Kozikowski. Delnicki was also nominated by the Independent Party. He had represented the 14th District since 2017.

2022 Connecticut State House of Representatives election, 14th District
Party	Candidate	Votes	%
Republican	Tom Delnicki (incumbent)	5,043	49.48%
Democratic	Erica Evans	4,715	46.26%
United Community	Marek Kozikowski	270	2.65%
Independent Party	Tom Delnicki (incumbent)	164	1.61%
Total votes		10,192	100.00%
Republican hold			

=== District 15 ===
Democratic incumbent Bobby Gibson was reelected to a third full term after running unopposed. He had represented the 15th District since 2018, when he won the special election to fill the vacancy left by Democrat David A. Baram, who was elected as the 3rd District Probate Court judge.

2022 Connecticut State House of Representatives election, 15th District
Party	Candidate	Votes	%
Democratic	Bobby Gibson (incumbent)	7,640	100.00%
Total votes		7,640	100.00%
Democratic hold			

=== District 16 ===
Democratic candidate Melissa Osborne was elected after defeating Republican candidate Mike Paine. This seat was previously held by Democrat John Hampton since 2013.

2022 Connecticut State House of Representatives election, 16th District
Party	Candidate	Votes	%
Democratic	Melissa Osborne	7,096	56.25%
Republican	Mike Paine	5,518	43.75%
Total votes		12,614	100.00%
Democratic hold			

=== District 17 ===
Democratic incumbent Eleni Kavros DeGraw was reelected to a second term after defeating Republican candidate Heather Maguire. Karvos DeGraw was also nominated by the Independent Party and Working Families Party. She had represented the 17th district since 2021.

2022 Connecticut State House of Representatives election, 17th District
Party	Candidate	Votes	%
Democratic	Eleni Kavros DeGraw (incumbent)	6,723	54.59%
Republican	Heather Maguire	5,306	43.08%
Independent Party	Eleni Kavros DeGraw (incumbent)	141	1.14%
Working Families	Eleni Kavros DeGraw (incumbent)	146	1.19%
Total votes		12,316	100.00%
Democratic hold			

=== District 18 ===
Democratic incumbent Jillian Gilchrest was reelected to a third term after running unopposed. She had represented the 18th district since 2019.

2022 Connecticut State House of Representatives election, 18th District
Party	Candidate	Votes	%
Democratic	Jillian Gilchrest (incumbent)	7,676	100.00%
Total votes		7,676	100.00%
Democratic hold			

=== District 19 ===
Democratic incumbent Tammy Exum was reelected to a second full term after running unopposed. She had represented the 19th district since 2019.

2022 Connecticut State House of Representatives election, 19th District
Party	Candidate	Votes	%
Democratic	Tammy Exum (incumbent)	9,268	100.00%
Total votes		9,268	100.00%
Democratic hold			

=== District 20 ===
Democratic incumbent Kate Farrar was reelected to a second term after defeating Republican candidate Anastasia Yopp. Farrar was also nominated by the Working Families Party. She had represented the 20th district since 2021.

2022 Connecticut State House of Representatives election, 20th District
Party	Candidate	Votes	%
Democratic	Kate Farrar (incumbent)	5,693	59.68%
Republican	Anastasia Yopp	3,581	37.54%
Working Families	Kate Farrar (incumbent)	265	2.78%
Total votes		9,539	100.00%
Democratic hold			

=== District 21 ===
Democratic incumbent Mike Demicco was reelected to a fifth term after defeating Republican candidate Joe Capodiefero. Demicco was also nominated by the Working Families Party. He had represented the 21st district since 2013.

2022 Connecticut State House of Representatives election, 21st District
Party	Candidate	Votes	%
Democratic	Mike Demicco (incumbent)	5,814	53.34%
Republican	Joe Capodiferro	4,793	43.98%
Independent Party	Joe Capodiferro	126	1.16%
Working Families	Mike Demicco (incumbent)	166	1.52%
Total votes		10,899	100.00%
Democratic hold			

=== District 22 ===
Republican candidate Francis Cooley was elected after defeating Democratic candidate Rebecca Martinez. This seat was previously held by Republican William Petit since 2017.

2022 Connecticut State House of Representatives election, 22nd District
Party	Candidate	Votes	%
Republican	Francis Cooley	5,046	50.26%
Democratic	Rebecca Martinez	4,705	46.87%
Independent Party	Rebecca Martinez	161	1.60%
Working Families	Rebecca Martinez	127	1.27%
Total votes		10,039	100.00%
Republican hold			

=== District 23 ===
Republican incumbent Devin Carney was reelected to a fifth term after defeating Democratic candidate Colin Heffernan. Carney was also nominated by the Independent Party. Carney had represented the 23rd district since 2015.

2022 Connecticut's 23rd House of Representatives district election
- Turnout: 12,956 votes
Candidate	Devin Carney	J. Colin Heffernan
Party	Republican	Democratic
Popular vote	7,087	5,869
Percentage	54.701%	45.299%
- Precinct results Carney 50-60% 60-70% Heffernan 50-60%
Representative before election
Devin Carney
Republican
Elected Representative
Devin Carney
Republican

2022 Connecticut State House of Representatives election, 23rd District
Party	Candidate	Votes	%
Republican	Devin Carney (incumbent)	6,880	53.10%
Democratic	J. Colin Heffernan	5,869	45.30%
Independent Party	Devin Carney (incumbent)	207	1.60%
Total votes		12,956	100.00%
Republican hold			

=== District 24 ===
Democratic incumbent Emmanuel Sanchez was reelected to a second term after defeating Republican candidate Paul Edwards. Sanchez was also nominated by the Working Families Party. He had represented the 24th district since 2021.

2022 Connecticut State House of Representatives election, 24th District
Party	Candidate	Votes	%
Democratic	Emmanuel Sanchez (incumbent)	3,173	60.06%
Republican	Paul Edwards	1,931	36.55%
Working Families	Emmanuel Sanchez (incumbent)	179	3.39%
Write-in		0	0.00%
Total votes		5,283	100.00%
Democratic hold			

=== District 25 ===
Democratic incumbent Bobby Sanchez was reelected to an eleventh term after defeating Republican candidate Jerrell Hargraves. Sanchez had represented the 25th district since 2011.

2022 Connecticut State House of Representatives election, 25th District
Party	Candidate	Votes	%
Democratic	Bobby Sanchez (incumbent)	2,214	71.42%
Republican	Jerrell Hargraves	886	28.58%
Total votes		3,100	100.00%
Democratic hold			

=== District 26 ===
Democratic incumbent Peter Tercyak was reelected to a nineteenth term after defeating Republican candidate Joel Moret. Tercyak was also nominated by the Working Families Party. He had represented the 26th district since 2003.

2022 Connecticut State House of Representatives election, 26th District
Party	Candidate	Votes	%
Democratic	Peter Tercyak (incumbent)	2,816	58.33%
Republican	Joel Moret	1,843	38.17%
Working Families	Peter Tercyak (incumbent)	169	3.50%
Total votes		4,828	100.00%
Democratic hold			

=== District 27 ===
Democratic incumbent Gary Turco was reelected to a third term after defeating Republican candidate Nancy Cappello. Turco was also nominated by the Working Families Party. He had represented the 27th district since 2019.

2022 Connecticut State House of Representatives election, 27th District
Party	Candidate	Votes	%
Democratic	Gary Turco (incumbent)	5,261	57.05%
Republican	Nancy Cappello	3,741	40.57%
Independent Party	Nancy Cappello	58	0.63%
Working Families	Gary Turco (incumbent)	162	1.76%
Total votes		9,222	100.00%
Democratic hold			

=== District 28 ===
Democratic incumbent Amy Morrin Bello was reelected to a second term after defeating Republican candidate Brianna Timbro. Morrin Bello was also nominated by the Working Families Party. She had represented the 28th district since 2021.

2022 Connecticut State House of Representatives election, 28th District
Party	Candidate	Votes	%
Democratic	Amy Morrin Bello (incumbent)	5,655	52.84%
Republican	Brianna Timbro	4,859	45.40%
Working Families	Amy Morrin Bello (incumbent)	189	1.77%
Total votes		10,703	100.00%
Democratic hold			

=== District 29 ===
Democratic incumbent Kerry Szeps Wood was reelected to a third term after defeating Republican candidate Pankaj Prakash. Szeps Wood had represented the 29th district since 2019.

2022 Connecticut State House of Representatives election, 29th District
Party	Candidate	Votes	%
Democratic	Kerry Szeps Wood (incumbent)	4,939	54.69%
Republican	Pankaj Prakash	4,092	45.31%
Total votes		9,031	100.00%
Democratic hold			

=== District 30 ===
Republican incumbent Donna Veach was reelected to a second term after defeating Democratic candidate Denise McNair. Veach had represented the 30th district since 2021.

2022 Connecticut State House of Representatives election, 30th District
Party	Candidate	Votes	%
Republican	Donna Veach (incumbent)	5,780	54.87%
Democratic	Denise McNair	4,624	43.90%
Working Families	Denise McNair	130	1.23%
Total votes		10,534	100.00%
Republican hold			

=== District 31 ===
Democratic incumbent Jill Barry was reelected to a third term after defeating Republican candidate Gary Giannelli. Barry was also nominated by the Independent Party. She had represented the 31st district since 2019.

2022 Connecticut State House of Representatives election, 31st District
Party	Candidate	Votes	%
Democratic	Jill Barry (incumbent)	6,882	60.37%
Republican	Gary Giannelli	4,304	37.76%
Independent Party	Jill Barry (incumbent)	213	1.87%
Total votes		11,399	100.00%
Democratic hold			

=== District 32 ===
Republican incumbent Christie Carpino was reelected to a 12th term after defeating Democratic candidate Rose Aletta. Carpino was also nominated by the Independent Party. She had represented the 32nd district since 2011.

2022 Connecticut State House of Representatives election, 32nd District
Party	Candidate	Votes	%
Republican	Christie Carpino (incumbent)	6,482	59.09%
Democratic	Rose Aletta	4,163	37.95%
Independent Party	Christie Carpino (incumbent)	170	1.55%
Working Families	Rose Aletta	155	1.41%
Total votes		10,970	100.00%
Republican hold			

=== District 33 ===
Democratic incumbent Brandon Chafee was reelected to a second term after defeating Republican candidate Quatina Frazer. Chafee was also nominated by the Independent Party. He had represented the 33rd district since 2021.

2022 Connecticut State House of Representatives election, 33rd District
Party	Candidate	Votes	%
Democratic	Brandon Chafee (incumbent)	4,489	62.77%
Republican	Quatina Frazer	2,455	34.33%
Independent Party	Brandon Chafee (incumbent)	208	2.91%
Total votes		7,152	100.00%
Democratic hold			

=== District 34 ===
Republican incumbent Irene Haines was reelected to a third term after defeating Democratic candidate John Olin. Haines had represented the 34th district since 2019.

2022 Connecticut State House of Representatives election, 34th District
Party	Candidate	Votes	%
Republican	Irene Haines (incumbent)	6,119	52.52%
Democratic	John Olin	5,261	45.16%
Independent Party	John Olin	165	1.42%
Working Families	John Olin	105	0.90%
Total votes		11,650	100.00%
Republican hold			

=== District 35 ===
Republican candidate Chris Aniskovich was elected after defeating Democratic incumbent Christine Goupil. Goupil was also nominated by the Independent Party. Goupil had represented the 35th district since 2021.

2022 Connecticut's 35th House of Representatives district election
- Turnout: 11,461 votes
Candidate	Chris Aniskovich	Christine Goupil
Party	Republican	Democratic
Popular vote	5,841	5,536
Percentage	50.964%	48.303%
- Precinct results Aniskovich 50-60% Goupil 40-50%
Representative before election
Christine Goupil
Democratic
Elected Representative
Chris Aniskovich
Republican

2022 Connecticut State House of Representatives election, 35th District
Party	Candidate	Votes	%
Republican	Chris Aniskovich	5,841	50.96%
Democratic	Christine Goupil (incumbent)	5,374	46.89%
Independent Party	Christine Goupil (incumbent)	162	1.41%
Green	Hugh Birdsall	84	0.73%
Total votes		11,461	100.00%
Republican gain from Democratic			

=== District 36 ===
Democratic incumbent Christine Palm was reelected to a third term after defeating Republican candidate Chris Turkington with 57% of the vote. Palm was also nominated by the Independent Party and Working Families Party. She had represented the 36th district since 2019.

2022 Connecticut State House of Representatives election, 36th District
Party	Candidate	Votes	%
Democratic	Christine Palm (incumbent)	6,734	54.25%
Republican	Chris Turkington	5,359	43.18%
Independent Party	Christine Palm (incumbent)	186	1.50%
Working Families	Christine Palm (incumbent)	133	1.07%
Total votes		12,412	100.00%
Democratic hold			

=== District 37 ===
Republican incumbent Holly Cheeseman was reelected to a sixth term after defeating Democratic candidate Nick Menapace. Cheeseman was also nominated by the Independent Party. She had represented the 37th district since 2017.

2022 Connecticut State House of Representatives election, 37th District
Party	Candidate	Votes	%
Republican	Holly Cheeseman (incumbent)	6,134	50.75%
Democratic	Nick Menapace	5,657	46.81%
Independent Party	Holly Cheeseman (incumbent)	161	1.33%
Working Families	Nick Menapace	134	1.11%
Total votes		12,086	100.00%
Republican hold			

=== District 38 ===
Republican incumbent Kathleen McCarty was reelected to eighth term after defeating Democratic candidate Nick Gauthier. She had represented the 38th district since 2015.

2022 Connecticut State House of Representatives election, 38th District
Party	Candidate	Votes	%
Republican	Kathleen McCarty (incumbent)	5,628	51.04%
Democratic	Nick Gauthier	5,108	46.33%
Independent Party	Nick Gauthier	141	1.28%
Working Families	Nick Gauthier	149	1.35%
Total votes		11,026	100.00%
Republican hold			

=== District 39 ===
Democratic incumbent Anthony Nolan was reelected to a third term after defeating Republican candidate Karen Paul. Nolan was also nominated by the Working Families Party. He had represented the 39th district since 2019.

2022 Connecticut State House of Representatives election, 39th District
Party	Candidate	Votes	%
Democratic	Anthony Nolan (incumbent)	2,843	75.55%
Republican	Karen Paul	720	19.13%
Working Families	Anthony Nolan (incumbent)	200	5.31%
Total votes		3,763	100.00%
Democratic hold			

=== District 40 ===
Democratic incumbent Christine Conley was reelected to a sixth term after defeating Independent candidate Lauren Gauthier. Conely was also nominated by the Working Families Party. She had represented the 40th district since 2016.

2022 Connecticut State House of Representatives election, 40th District
Party	Candidate	Votes	%
Democratic	Christine Conley (incumbent)	3,969	75.48%
Independent Party	Lauren Gauthier	922	17.54%
Working Families	Christine Conley (incumbent)	367	6.98%
Total votes		5,258	100.00%
Democratic hold			

=== District 41 ===
Democratic candidate and former state representative Aundre Bumgardner was elected after defeating Republican candidate Robert Boris and Petitioning candidate James Francis Dunigan IV . Bumgardner was also nominated by the Working Families Party. This seat was previously held by Democrat Joe de la Cruz since 2017.

2022 Connecticut State House of Representatives election, 41st District
Party	Candidate	Votes	%
Democratic	Aundre Bumgardner	6,362	60.05%
Republican	Robert Boris	3,716	35.08%
Independent Party	Robert Boris	125	1.18%
Working Families	Aundre Bumgardner	176	1.66%
Petitioning Candidate	James Francis Dunigan IV	215	2.03%
Total votes		10,594	100.00%
Democratic hold			

=== District 42 ===
Democratic candidate Keith Denning was elected after defeating Republican candidate Kim Healy. Healy was also nominated by the Independent Party. This seat was previously held by Republican Mike France since 2015.

2022 Connecticut State House of Representatives election, 42nd District
Party	Candidate	Votes	%
Democratic	Keith Denning	5,514	52.39%
Republican	Kim Healy	4,838	45.97%
Independent Party	Kim Healy	173	1.64%
Total votes		10,525	100.00%
Democratic gain from Republican			

=== District 43 ===
Republican incumbent Greg Howard was reelected to a second term after defeating Democratic candidate Ashley Gillece. Howard was also nominated by the Independent Party. He had represented the 43rd district since 2021.

2022 Connecticut State House of Representatives election, 43rd District
Party	Candidate	Votes	%
Republican	Greg Howard (incumbent)	5,738	54.28%
Democratic	Ashley Gillece	4,584	43.36%
Independent Party	Greg Howard (incumbent)	249	2.36%
Total votes		10,571	100.00%
Republican hold			

=== District 44 ===
Republican incumbent Anne Dauphinais was reelected to a sixth term after defeating Democratic candidate Dave Randall. Dauphinais had represented the 44th district since 2017.

2022 Connecticut State House of Representatives election, 44th District
Party	Candidate	Votes	%
Republican	Anne Dauphinais (incumbent)	4,885	61.77%
Democratic	Dave Randall	2,866	36.24%
Independent Party	Dave Randall	157	1.99%
Total votes		7,908	100.00%
Republican hold			

=== District 45 ===
Republican incumbent Brian Lanoue was reelected to a third term after defeating Democratic candidate Kayla Thompson. Lanoue had represented the 45th district since 2019.

2022 Connecticut State House of Representatives election, 45th District
Party	Candidate	Votes	%
Republican	Brian Lanoue (incumbent)	6,040	62.92%
Democratic	Kayla Thompson	3,560	37.08%
Total votes		9,600	100.00%
Republican hold			

=== District 46 ===
Democratic candidate Derell Wilson was elected after defeating Republican candidate Robert Bell. Wilson was also nominated by the Working Families Party. The seat was previously held by Democrat Emmett Riley since 2013.

2022 Connecticut State House of Representatives election, 46th District
Party	Candidate	Votes	%
Democratic	Derell Wilson	2,574	54.61%
Republican	Robert Bell	1,928	40.91%
Independent Party	Robert Bell	95	2.02%
Working Families	Derell Wilson	116	2.46%
Total votes		4,713	100.00%
Democratic hold			

=== District 47 ===
Republican incumbent Doug Dubitsky was reelected to a fifth term after defeating Democratic candidate Dave Nowakowski. Dubitsky had represented the 47th district since 2015.

2022 Connecticut State House of Representatives election, 47th District
Party	Candidate	Votes	%
Republican	Doug Dubitsky (incumbent)	5,992	60.29%
Democratic	Dave Nowakowski	3,774	37.97%
Independent Party	Dave Nowakowski	173	1.74%
Total votes		9,939	100.00%
Republican hold			

=== District 48 ===
Republican candidate Mark DeCaprio was elected after defeating Democratic candidate Christopher Rivers. DeCaprio was also nominated by the Independent Party. This seat was previously held by Democrat Brian Smith since 2020.

2022 Connecticut State House of Representatives election, 48th District
Party	Candidate	Votes	%
Republican	Mark DeCaprio	5,876	51.23%
Democratic	Christopher Rivers	5,450	47.52%
Independent Party	Mark DeCaprio	143	1.25%
Total votes		11,469	100.00%
Republican gain from Democratic			

=== District 49 ===
Democratic incumbent Susan Johnson was reelected to an eighth term after running unopposed. Johnson was also nominated by the Working Families Party. She had represented the 49th district since 2009.

2022 Connecticut State House of Representatives election, 49th District
Party	Candidate	Votes	%
Democratic	Susan Johnson (incumbent)	3,258	88.15%
Working Families	Susan Johnson (incumbent)	394	10.66%
Write-in		44	1.19%
Total votes		3,696	100.00%
Democratic hold			

=== District 50 ===
Democratic incumbent Pat Boyd was reelected to a fourth term after defeating Republican Aaron Soucy. Boyd had represented the 50th district since 2017.

2022 Connecticut State House of Representatives election, 50th District
Party	Candidate	Votes	%
Democratic	Pat Boyd (incumbent)	6,055	53.87%
Republican	Aaron Soucy	5,186	46.13%
Total votes		11,241	100.00%
Democratic hold			

=== District 51 ===
Republican incumbent Rick Hayes was reelected to a third term after defeating Democratic candidate Christine Maine. Hayes was also nominated by the Independent Party. He had represented the 51st district since 2019.

2022 Connecticut State House of Representatives election, 51st District
Party	Candidate	Votes	%
Republican	Rick Hayes (incumbent)	4,673	63.88%
Democratic	Christine Maine	2,513	34.35%
Independent Party	Rick Hayes (incumbent)	129	1.76%
Total votes		7,315	100.00%
Republican hold			

=== District 52 ===
Republican incumbent Kurt Vail was reelected to a fifth term after defeating Democratic candidate Gregg Dafoe. Vail was also nominated by the Independent Party. He had represented the 52nd district since 2015.

2022 Connecticut State House of Representatives election, 52nd District
Party	Candidate	Votes	%
Republican	Kurt Vail (incumbent)	6,722	61.98%
Democratic	Gregg Dafoe	3,961	36.52%
Independent Party	Kurt Vail (incumbent)	163	1.50%
Total votes		10,846	100.00%
Republican hold			

=== District 53 ===
Republican incumbent Tammy Nuccio was reelected to a second term after defeating Democratic candidate Kenneth Trice. Nuccio was also nominated by the Independent Party. She had represented the 53rd district since 2021.

2022 Connecticut State House of Representatives election, 53rd District
Party	Candidate	Votes	%
Republican	Tammy Nuccio (incumbent)	5,992	54.94%
Democratic	Kenneth Trice	4,585	42.04%
Independent Party	Tammy Nuccio (incumbent)	166	1.52%
Working Families	Kenneth Trice	163	1.49%
Total votes		10,906	100.00%
Republican hold			

=== District 54 ===
Democratic incumbent Gregory Haddad was reelected to a seventh term after running unopposed. He was also nominated by the Working Families Party. Haddad had represented the 54th district since 2011.

2022 Connecticut State House of Representatives election, 54th District
Party	Candidate	Votes	%
Democratic	Gregory Haddad (incumbent)	3,574	91.85%
Working Families	Gregory Haddad (incumbent)	317	8.15%
Total votes		3,891	100.00%
Democratic hold			

=== District 55 ===
Republican candidate Steve Weir was elected after defeating Democratic candidate Wes Skorski. The seat was previously held by Republican Robin Green since 2017.

2022 Connecticut State House of Representatives election, 55th District
Party	Candidate	Votes	%
Republican	Steve Weir	6,703	52.54%
Democratic	Wes Skorski	6,054	47.46%
Total votes		12,757	100.00%
Republican hold			

=== District 56 ===
Democratic candidate Kevin Brown was elected after defeating Republican candidate Jim Tedford. Brown was also nominated by the Independent Party and the Working Families Party. The seat was previously held by Democrat Mike Winkler since 2017

2022 Connecticut State House of Representatives election, 56th District
Party	Candidate	Votes	%
Democratic	Kevin Brown	3,885	53.68%
Republican	Jim Tedford	3,139	43.37%
Independent Party	Kevin Brown	95	1.31%
Working Families	Kevin Brown	119	1.64%
Total votes		7,238	100.00%
Democratic hold			

=== District 57 ===
Democratic incumbent Jaime Foster was reelected to a second term after defeating Republican candidate David Stavens. Foster was also nominated by the Independent Party, Working Families Party, and the Forward Party. Foster had represented the 57th district since 2021.

2022 Connecticut State House of Representatives election, 57th District
Party	Candidate	Votes	%
Democratic	Jaime Foster (incumbent)	4,819	48.18%
Republican	David E. Stavens	4,886	48.85%
Independent Party	Jaime Foster (incumbent)	117	1.17%
Working Families	Jaime Foster (incumbent)	153	1.53%
Forward	Jaime Foster (incumbent)	27	0.27%
Total votes		10,002	100.00%
Democratic hold			

=== District 58 ===
Democratic incumbent Tom Arnone was reelected to a third term after defeating Republican Robert Hendrickson. Arnone was also nominated by the Working Families Party. Arnone had represented the 58th district since 2019.

2022 Connecticut State House of Representatives election, 58th District
Party	Candidate	Votes	%
Democratic	Tom Arnone (incumbent)	3,726	51.85%
Republican	Robert A. Hendrickson	3,336	46.42%
Working Families	Tom Arnone (incumbent)	124	1.73%
Total votes		7,186	100.00%
Democratic hold			

=== District 59 ===
Republican incumbent Carol Hall was reelected to a fourth term after defeating Democratic candidate Matt Despard. Hall had represented the 59th district since 2017.

2022 Connecticut State House of Representatives election, 59th District
Party	Candidate	Votes	%
Republican	Carol Hall (incumbent)	4,788	53.03%
Democratic	Matt Despard	4,051	44.87%
Independent Party	Matt Despard	110	1.22%
Working Families	Matt Despard	80	0.89%
Total votes		9,029	100.0%
Republican hold			

=== District 60 ===
Democratic incumbent Jane Garibay was reelected to a fourth term after defeating Republican candidate Len Walker. Garibay was also nominated by the Working Families Party. Garibay had represented the 60th district since 2017.

2022 Connecticut State House of Representatives election, 60th District
Party	Candidate	Votes	%
Democratic	Jane Garibay (incumbent)	6,106	60.65%
Republican	Len Walker	3,667	36.42%
Independent Party	Len Walker	104	1.03%
Working Families	Jane Garibay (incumbent)	191	1.90%
Total votes		10,068	100.00%
Democratic hold			

=== District 61 ===
Republican incumbent Tami Zawistowski was reelected to a fifth term after defeating Democratic candidate Jim Irwin. Zawistowski was also nominated by the Independent Party. Zawistowski had represented the 61st district since 2015.

2022 Connecticut State House of Representatives election, 61st District
Party	Candidate	Votes	%
Republican	Tami Zawistowski (incumbent)	6,269	58.75%
Democratic	Jim Irwin	4,215	39.50%
Independent Party	Tami Zawistowski (incumbent)	186	1.74%
Total votes		10,670	100.00%
Republican hold			

=== District 62 ===
Republican incumbent Mark Anderson was reelected to a second term after defeating Democratic candidate Jim Irwin. Anderson was also nominated by the Independent Party. Anderson had represented the 62nd district since 2021.

2022 Connecticut State House of Representatives election, 62nd District
Party	Candidate	Votes	%
Republican	Mark Anderson (incumbent)	6,570	53.95%
Democratic	Kim Becker	5,448	44.74%
Independent Party	Mark Anderson (incumbent)	160	1.31%
Total votes		12,178	100.00%
Republican hold			

=== District 63 ===
Republican incumbent Jay Case was reelected to a sixth term after defeating Democratic candidate Althea Candy Perez. Case had represented the 63rd district since 2013.

2022 Connecticut State House of Representatives election, 63rd District
Party	Candidate	Votes	%
Republican	Jay Case (incumbent)	6,463	66.55%
Democratic	Althea "Candy" Perez	3,249	33.45%
Total votes		9,712	100.00%
Republican hold			

=== District 64 ===
Democratic incumbent Maria Horn was reelected to her third term after defeating Republican candidate Christopher DuPont. Horn was also nominated by the Independent Party and the Working Families Party. Horn had represented the 64th district since 2019.

2022 Connecticut State House of Representatives election, 64th District
Party	Candidate	Votes	%
Democratic	Maria Horn (incumbent)	7,139	61.46%
Republican	Christopher DuPont	4,182	36.01%
Independent Party	Maria Horn (incumbent)	117	1.01%
Working Families	Maria Horn (incumbent)	177	1.52%
Total votes		11,615	100.00%
Democratic hold			

=== District 65 ===
Democratic incumbent Michelle Cook was reelected to her eighth term after running unopposed. Cook had represented the 65th district since 2009.

2022 Connecticut State House of Representatives election, 65th District
Party	Candidate	Votes	%
Democratic	Michelle Cook (incumbent)	4,142	100.00%
Total votes		4,142	100.00%
Democratic hold			

=== District 66 ===
Republican candidate Karen Reddington-Hughes was elected after defeating Democratic candidate Matt Dyer. This seat was previously held by Republican David Wilson since 2016.

2022 Connecticut State House of Representatives election, 66th District
Party	Candidate	Votes	%
Republican	Karen Reddington-Hughes	6,806	54.03%
Democratic	Matt Dyer	5,522	43.84%
Independent Party	Matt Dyer	131	1.04%
Working Families	Matt Dyer	138	1.10%
Total votes		12,597	100.00%
Republican hold			

=== District 67 ===
Republican incumbent Bill Buckbee was reelected to a fourth term after defeating Democratic candidate Alexandra Thomas. Buckbee was also nominated by the Independent Party. Buckbee had represented the 67th district since 2017.

2022 Connecticut State House of Representatives election, 67th District
Party	Candidate	Votes	%
Republican	Bill Buckbee (incumbent)	5,514	59.66%
Democratic	Alexandra Thomas	3,519	38.07%
Independent Party	Bill Buckbee (incumbent)	210	2.27%
Total votes		9,243	100.00%
Republican hold			

=== District 68 ===
Republican Joe Polletta was reelected to a third term after running unopposed. Polletta was also nominated by the Independent Party. Polletta had represented the 68th district since 2017, when he won a special election to succeed Republican Eric Berthel, who was elected to the state senate.

2022 Connecticut State House of Representatives election, 68th District
Party	Candidate	Votes	%
Republican	Joe Polletta (incumbent)	7,623	94.16%
Independent Party	Joe Polletta (incumbent)	473	5.84%
Total votes		8,096	100.00%
Republican hold			

=== District 69 ===
Republican incumbent Cindy Harrison was elected to a second term after running unopposed. Harrison had represented the 69th district since 2021.

2022 Connecticut State House of Representatives election, 69th District
Party	Candidate	Votes	%
Republican	Cindy Harrison (incumbent)	7,307	100.00%
Total votes		7,307	100.00%
Republican hold			

=== District 70 ===
Republican candidate Seth Bronko was elected after defeating Democratic candidate Jeff Litke. This seat was previously held by Republican Rosa Rebimbas since 2009.

2022 Connecticut State House of Representatives election, 70th District
Party	Candidate	Votes	%
Republican	Seth Bronko	4,203	56.25%
Democratic	Jeff Litke	3,269	43.75%
Total votes		7,472	100.00%
Republican hold			

=== District 71 ===
Republican incumbent William Pizzuto won reelection to a first full term after running unopposed. He had represented the 71st district since 2022, when he won a special election after Republican Anthony D'Amelio resigned.

2022 Connecticut State House of Representatives election, 71st District
Party	Candidate	Votes	%
Republican	William Pizzuto (incumbent)	5,346	100.00%
Total votes		5,346	100.00%
Republican hold			

=== District 72 ===
Democratic incumbent Larry Butler was reelected to a ninth term after defeating Republican candidate Vernon Matthews. Butler was also nominated by the Independent Party. Butler had represented the 72nd district since 2007.

2022 Connecticut State House of Representatives election, 72nd District
Party	Candidate	Votes	%
Democratic	Larry Butler (incumbent)	2,145	66.04%
Republican	Vernon Matthews, Jr.	1,013	31.19%
Independent Party	Larry Butler (incumbent)	90	2.77%
Total votes		3,248	100.00%
Democratic hold			

=== District 73 ===
Democratic incumbent Ronald Napoli Jr. was reelected to a third term after defeating Republican candidate Abigail Diaz Pizarro. Napoli was also nominated by the Working Families Party. Napoli had represented the 73rd district since 2019.

2022 Connecticut State House of Representatives election, 73rd District
Party	Candidate	Votes	%
Democratic	Ronald Napoli (incumbent)	3,227	61.61%
Republican	Abigail Diaz Pizarro	1,820	34.75%
Independent Party	Abigail Diaz Pizarro	66	1.26%
Working Families	Ronald Napoli (incumbent)	125	2.39%
Total votes		5,238	100.00%
Democratic hold			

=== District 74 ===
Democratic incumbent Michael DiGiovancarlo was reelected to a second term after running unopposed. DiGiovancarlo had represented the 74th district since 2021.

2022 Connecticut State House of Representatives election, 74th District
Party	Candidate	Votes	%
Democratic	Michael DiGiovancarlo (incumbent)	3,185	100.00%
Total votes		3,185	100.00%
Democratic hold			

=== District 75 ===
Democratic incumbent Geraldo Reyes was reelected to his fourth term after running unopposed. Reyes had represented the 75th district since 2017.

2022 Connecticut State House of Representatives election, 75th District
Party	Candidate	Votes	%
Democratic	Geraldo Reyes (incumbent)	1,682	100.00%
Total votes		1,682	100.00%
Democratic hold			

=== District 76 ===
Republican incumbent John Piscopo was reelected to his 13th term after defeating Democratic candidate Sharon Farmer. Piscopo had represented the 76th district since 1999.

2022 Connecticut State House of Representatives election, 76th District
Party	Candidate	Votes	%
Republican	John Piscopo (incumbent)	7,935	66.64%
Democratic	Sharon Farmer	3,972	33.36%
Total votes		11,907	100.00%
Republican hold			

=== District 77 ===
Republican incumbent Cara Pavalock-D'Amato was reelected to his fifth term after defeating Democratic candidate Andrew Rasmussen-Tuller. D'Amato was also nominated by the Independent Party. D'Amato had represented the 77th district since 2015.

2022 Connecticut State House of Representatives election, 77th District
Party	Candidate	Votes	%
Republican	Cara Pavalock-D'Amato (incumbent)	4,800	51.98%
Democratic	Andrew Rasmussen-Tuller	4,210	45.59%
Independent Party	Cara Pavalock-D'Amato (incumbent)	116	1.26%
Working Families	Andrew Rasmussen-Tuller	109	1.18%
Total votes		9,235	100.00%
Republican hold			

=== District 78 ===
Republican candidate Joe Hoxha was elected after running unopposed. This seat was previously held by Republican Whit Betts since 2011.

2022 Connecticut State House of Representatives election, 78th District
Party	Candidate	Votes	%
Republican	Joe Hoxha	6,317	100.00%
Total votes		6,317	100.00%
Republican hold			

=== District 79 ===
Democratic candidate Mary Fortier was elected after defeating Republican candidate Jennifer Van Gorder. Fortier was also nominated by the Independent Party and the Working Families Party. This seat was previously held by Democrat Chris Ziogas since 2017.

2022 Connecticut State House of Representatives election, 79th District
Party	Candidate	Votes	%
Democratic	Mary Fortier	3,269	49.51%
Republican	Jennifer Van Gorder	3,178	48.13%
Independent Party	Mary Fortier	85	1.29%
Working Families	Mary Fortier	71	1.08%
Total votes		6,603	100.00%
Democratic hold			

=== District 80 ===
Republican incumbent Gale Mastrofrancesco was reelected to a third term after running unopposed. Mastrofrancesco had represented the 80th district since 2019.

2022 Connecticut State House of Representatives election, 80th District
Party	Candidate	Votes	%
Republican	Gale Mastrofrancesco (incumbent)	8,278	100.00%
Total votes		8,278	100.00%
Republican hold			

=== District 81 ===
Democratic candidate Chris Poulos was elected after narrowly defeating Republican candidate Tony Morrison by 1 vote. Morrison was also nominated by the Independent Party. This seat was previously held by Republican John Fusco since 2017.

2022 Connecticut State House of Representatives election, 81st District
Party	Candidate	Votes	%
Democratic	Chris Poulos	5,297	50.0047%
Total	Tony Morrison	5,296	49.9953%
Republican	Tony Morrison	5,179	48.8908%
Independent Party	Tony Morrison	117	1.1045%
Total votes		10,593	100.00%
Democratic gain from Republican			

=== District 82 ===
Democratic incumbent Michael Quinn was reelected to a second term after running unopposed. He was also nominated by the Working Families Party. Quinn had represented the 82nd district since 2021.

2022 Connecticut State House of Representatives election, 82nd District
Party	Candidate	Votes	%
Democratic	Michael Quinn (incumbent)	4,252	89.99%
Working Families	Michael Quinn (incumbent)	473	10.01%
Total votes		4,725	100.00%
Democratic hold			

=== District 83 ===
Democratic candidate Jack Fazzino was elected after defeating Republican candidate Lou Arata. Fazzino was also nominated by the Working Families Party. This seat was previously held by Democrat Catherine Abercrombie since 2005.

2022 Connecticut State House of Representatives election, 83rd District
Party	Candidate	Votes	%
Democratic	Jack Fazzino	4,818	48.87%
Republican	Lou Arata	4,766	48.35%
Independent Party	Lou Arata	106	1.08%
Working Families	Jack Fazzino	168	1.70%
Total votes		9,858	100.00%
Democratic hold			

=== District 84 ===
Democratic incumbent Hilda Santiago was reelected to a sixth term after running unopposed. Santiago had represented the 84th district since 2013.

2022 Connecticut State House of Representatives election, 84th District
Party	Candidate	Votes	%
Democratic	Hilda Santiago (incumbent)	2,392	100.00%
Total votes		2,392	100.00%
Democratic hold			

=== District 85 ===
Democratic incumbent Mary Mushinsky was reelected to her 22nd term after defeating Republican Kerry Lentz. Mushinsky was also nominated by the Working Families Party. Mushinsky had represented the 85th district since 1981.

2022 Connecticut State House of Representatives election, 85th District
Party	Candidate	Votes	%
Democratic	Mary Mushinsky (incumbent)	4,531	52.15%
Republican	Kerry Lentz	3,938	45.32%
Working Families	Mary Mushinsky (incumbent)	220	2.53%
Total votes		8,689	100.00
Democratic hold			

=== District 86 ===
Republican incumbent Vincent Candelora was reelected to his ninth term after running unopposed. Candelora had represented the 86th district since 2007.

2022 Connecticut State House of Representatives election, 86th District
Party	Candidate	Votes	%
Republican	Vincent Candelora (incumbent)	7,548	100.00%
Total votes		7,548	100.00%
Republican hold			

=== District 87 ===
Republican incumbent Dave Yaccarino was reelected to his seventh term after running unopposed. He was also nominated by the Independent Party. Yaccarino had represented the 87th district since 2011.

2022 Connecticut State House of Representatives election, 87th District
Party	Candidate	Votes	%
Republican	Dave Yaccarino (incumbent)	8,039	90.88%
Independent Party	David Yaccarino (incumbent)	807	9.12%
Total votes		8,846	100.00%
Republican hold			

=== District 88 ===
Democratic incumbent Josh Elliott was reelected to a fourth term after defeating Republican Michael Pace. Elliott was also nominated by the Working Families Party. Elliott had represented the 88th district since 2017.

2022 Connecticut State House of Representatives election, 88th District
Party	Candidate	Votes	%
Democratic	Josh Elliott (incumbent)	5,003	63.13%
Republican	Michael Pace	2,685	33.88%
Working Families	Josh Elliott (incumbent)	237	2.99%
Total votes		7,925	100.00%
Democratic hold			

=== District 89 ===
Republican incumbent Lezlye Zupkus won reelection to a sixth term after defeating Democratic candidate Kevin O'Leary. She was also nominated by the Independent Party. Zupkus had represented the 89th district since 2013.

2022 Connecticut State House of Representatives election, 89th District
Party	Candidate	Votes	%
Republican	Lezlye Zupkus (incumbent)	7,056	61.60%
Democratic	Kevin J. O'Leary	4,232	36.95%
Independent Party	Lezlye Zupkus (incumbent)	166	1.45%
Total votes		11,454	100.00%
Republican hold			

=== District 90 ===
Republican incumbent Craig Fishbein was reelected to a fourth term after defeating Democratic candidate Rebecca Hyland. He was also nominated by the Independent Party. Fishbein had represented the 90th district since 2017.

2022 Connecticut State House of Representatives election, 90th District
Party	Candidate	Votes	%
Republican	Craig Fishbein (incumbent)	6,020	54.19%
Democratic	Rebecca Hyland	4,777	43.00%
Independent Party	Craig Fishbein (incumbent)	146	1.31%
Working Families	Rebecca Hyland	167	1.50%
Total votes		11,110	100.00%
Republican hold			

=== District 91 ===
Democratic incumbent Mike D'Agostino was reelected to a sixth term after running unopposed. D'Agostino had represented the 91st district since 2012.

2022 Connecticut State House of Representatives election, 91st District
Party	Candidate	Votes	%
Democratic	Mike D'Agostino (incumbent)	5,981	100.00'%
Total votes		5,981	100.00%
Democratic hold			

=== District 92 ===
Democratic incumbent Patricia Dillon was reelected to a 20th term after defeating Independent candidate Lesley McGuirk. Dillon was also nominated by the Working Families Party. Dillon had represented the 92nd district since 1985.

2022 Connecticut State House of Representatives election, 92nd District
Party	Candidate	Votes	%
Democratic	Patricia Dillon (incumbent)	4,470	88.53%
Working Families	Patricia Dillon (incumbent)	338	6.69%
Petitioning	Lesley Heffel McGuirk	241	4.77%
Total votes		5,049	100.00%
Democratic hold			

=== District 93 ===
Democratic incumbent Toni Walker was reelected to an eleventh term after defeating Republican candidate Percy Sanders. Walker had represented the 93rd district since 2001, when she won the special election to succeed Howard C. Scipio.

2022 Connecticut State House of Representatives election, 93rd District
Party	Candidate	Votes	%
Democratic	Toni Walker (incumbent)	3,001	91.47%
Republican	Percy Sanders	280	8.53%
Total votes		3,281	100.00%
Democratic hold			

=== District 94 ===
Democratic incumbent Robyn Porter was reelected to a fifth term after running unopposed. Porter had represented the 94th district since 2015.

2022 Connecticut State House of Representatives election, 94th District
Party	Candidate	Votes	%
Democratic	Robyn Porter (incumbent)	2,698	100.00%
Total votes		2,698	100.00%
Democratic hold			

=== District 95 ===
Democratic incumbent Juan Candelaria was reelected to an eleventh term after running unopposed. Candelaria had represented the 95th district since 2003.

2022 Connecticut State House of Representatives election, 95th District
Party	Candidate	Votes	%
Democratic	Juan Candelaria (incumbent)	1,971	100.00%
Total votes		1,971	100.00%
Democratic hold			

=== District 96 ===
Democratic incumbent Roland Lemar was reelected to a seventh term after defeating Republican candidate Eric Mastroianni. Lemar had represented the 96th district since 2011.

2022 Connecticut State House of Representatives election, 96th District
Party	Candidate	Votes	%
Democratic	Roland Lemar (incumbent)	4,745	89.04%
Republican	Eric M. Mastroianni, Sr.	523	9.81%
Independent Party	Eric M. Mastroianni, Sr.	61	1.14%
Total votes		5,329	100.00%
Democratic hold			

=== District 97 ===
Democratic incumbent Alphonse Paolillo was reelected to a third term after defeating Republican Anthony Acri. Paolillo had represented the 97th district since 2019.

2022 Connecticut State House of Representatives election, 97th District
Party	Candidate	Votes	%
Democratic	Alphonse Paolillo (incumbent)	3,612	74.77%
Republican	Anthony Acri	1,156	23.93%
Independent Party	Anthony Acri	63	1.30%
Total votes		4,831	100.00%
Democratic hold			

=== District 98 ===
Democratic candidate Moira Rader was elected after defeating Republican candidate Rich DiNardo. She was also nominated by the Working Families Party. This seat was previously held by Democrat Sean Scanlon, who retired to be elected Connecticut Comptroller in 2022 and had represented the 98th district since 2015.

2022 Connecticut State House of Representatives election, 98th District
Party	Candidate	Votes	%
Democratic	Moira Rader	7,698	61.10%
Republican	Rich DiNardo	4,694	37.26%
Working Families	Moira Rader	207	1.64%
Total votes		12,599	100.00%
Democratic hold			

=== District 99 ===
Republican incumbent Joe Zullo was reelected to a second term after running unopposed. He had represented the 99th district since 2019, when he won the special election to succeed Democrat James Albis, who resigned.

2022 Connecticut State House of Representatives election, 99th District
Party	Candidate	Votes	%
Republican	Joe Zullo (incumbent)	5,450	100.00%
Total votes		5,450	100.00%
Republican hold			

=== District 100 ===
Democratic incumbent Quentin Williams was reelected to a third term after running unopposed. He was also nominated by the Working Families Party. Williams was killed in a head-on collision while driving southbound on Connecticut Route 9 in Cromwell when a northbound vehicle entered the lane and struck his car. Williams previously represented the district since 2019. Democrat Kai Belton was elected to succeed him on February 28, 2023.

2022 Connecticut State House of Representatives election, 100th District
Party	Candidate	Votes	%
Democratic	Quentin Williams (incumbent)	5,291	89.97%
Working Families	Quentin Williams (incumbent)	590	10.03%
Total votes		5,881	100.00%
Democratic hold			

=== District 101 ===
Democratic incumbent John-Michael Parker was reelected to a second term after defeating Republican candidate John Rasimas. Parker was also nominated by the Independent Party and Working Families Party.

2022 Connecticut State House of Representatives election, 101st District
Party	Candidate	Votes	%
Democratic	John-Michael Parker (incumbent)	6,688	53.20%
Republican	John A. Rasimas	5,589	44.46%
Independent Party	John-Michael Parker (incumbent)	162	1.29%
Working Families	John-Michael Parker (incumbent)	132	1.05%
Total votes		12,571	100.00%
Democratic hold			

=== District 102 ===
Democratic incumbent Robin Comey was reelected to a third term after defeating Republican candidate Ray Ingraham. Comey was also nominated by the Working Families Party. Comey had represented the 102nd district since 2019.

2022 Connecticut State House of Representatives election, 102nd District
Party	Candidate	Votes	%
Democratic	Robin Comey (incumbent)	5,800	54.94%
Republican	Ray Ingraham	4,484	42.47%
Independent Party	Ray Ingraham	82	0.78%
Working Families	Robin Comey (incumbent)	191	1.81%
Total votes		10,577	100.00%
Democratic hold			

=== District 103 ===
Democratic incumbent Liz Linehan was reelected to a fourth term after defeating Republican candidate Randy Raines. Linehan was also nominated by the Independent Party. Linehan had represented the 103rd district since 2017.

2022 Connecticut State House of Representatives election, 103rd District
Party	Candidate	Votes	%
Democratic	Liz Linehan (incumbent)	6,404	57.32%
Republican	Randy Raines	4,525	40.50%
Independent Party	Liz Linehan (incumbent)	243	2.18%
Total votes		11,172	100.00%
Democratic hold			

=== District 104 ===
Democratic incumbent Kara Rochelle was reelected to a third term after defeating Republican candidate Josh Shuart. Rochelle was also nominated by the Independent Party and the Working Families Party. She had represented the 104th district since 2019.

2022 Connecticut State House of Representatives election, 104th District
Party	Candidate	Votes	%
Democratic	Kara Rochelle (incumbent)	3,185	49.82%
Republican	Josh Shuart	3,022	47.27%
Independent Party	Kara Rochelle (incumbent)	99	1.55%
Working Families	Kara Rochelle (incumbent)	87	1.36%
Total votes		6,393	100.00%
Democratic hold			

=== District 105 ===
Republican incumbent Nicole Klarides-Ditria was reelected to a third term after running unopposed. She had represented the 105th district since 2019.

2022 Connecticut State House of Representatives election, 105th District
Party	Candidate	Votes	%
Republican	Nicole Klarides-Ditria (incumbent)	7,000	100.00%
Total votes		7,000	100.00%
Republican hold			

=== District 106 ===
Republican incumbent Mitch Bolinsky was reelected to a sixth term after running unopposed. He had represented the 106th district since 2013.

2022 Connecticut State House of Representatives election, 106th District
Party	Candidate	Votes	%
Republican	Mitch Bolinsky (incumbent)	7,632	100.00%
Total votes		7,632	100.00%
Republican hold			

=== District 107 ===
Republican candidate Martin Foncello was elected after defeating Democratic candidate Phoebe Holmes. This seat was previously held by Republican Stephen Harding, who had represented the 107th district since 2015.

2022 Connecticut State House of Representatives election, 107th District
Party	Candidate	Votes	%
Republican	Martin Foncello	5,930	54.16%
Democratic	Phoebe Holmes	4,835	44.16%
Working Families	Phoebe Holmes	184	1.68%
Total votes		10,949	100.00%
Republican hold			

=== District 108 ===
Republican incumbent Patrick Callahan was reelected to a second term after defeating Democratic candidate Jeff Ginsbury. Callahan had represented the 108th district since 2021.

2022 Connecticut State House of Representatives election, 108th District
Party	Candidate	Votes	%
Republican	Patrick Callahan (incumbent)	5,976	57.83%
Democratic	Jeff Ginsburg	4,357	42.17%
Total votes		8,714	100.00%
Republican hold			

=== District 109 ===
Democratic candidate Farley Santos was elected after defeating Republican candidate Jesy Fernandez. Santos was also nominated by the Independent Party. This seat was previously held by Democrat David Arconti, who had represented the 109th district since 2013.

2022 Connecticut State House of Representatives election, 109th District
Party	Candidate	Votes	%
Democratic	Farley Santos	2,998	53.48%
Republican	Jesy Fernandez	2,487	44.36%
Independent Party	Farley Santos	121	2.16%
Total votes		6,117	100.00%
Democratic hold			

=== District 110 ===
Democratic incumbent Bob Godfrey was reelected to his 18th term after defeating Republican candidate Eric Gleissner. Godfrey had represented the 110th district since 1989.

2022 Connecticut State House of Representatives election, 110th District
Party	Candidate	Votes	%
Democratic	Bob Godfrey (incumbent)	2,090	62.15%
Republican	Eric Gleissner	1,273	37.85%
Total votes		3,363	100.00%
Democratic hold			

=== District 111 ===
Democratic incumbent Aimee Berger-Girvalo was reelected to a second term after defeating Republican candidate Bob Herbert. Girvalo had represented the 111th district since 2021.

2022 Connecticut State House of Representatives election, 111th District
Party	Candidate	Votes	%
Democratic	Aimee Berger-Girvalo (incumbent)	6,179	55.20%
Republican	Bob Hebert	4,824	43.10%
Independent Party	Bob Hebert	190	1.70%
Total votes		11,193	100.00%
Democratic hold			

=== District 112 ===
Republican incumbent Tony Scott was reelected to his first full term after defeating Democratic candidate Sheila Papps. Scott had represented the 112th district since 2021, when he won the special election to succeed Republican J.P. Sredzinski, who resigned for private reasons.

2022 Connecticut State House of Representatives election, 112th District
Party	Candidate	Votes	%
Republican	Tony Scott (incumbent)	6,700	59.91%
Democratic	Sheila Papps	4,484	40.09%
Total votes		11,184	100.00%
Republican hold			

=== District 113 ===
Republican incumbent Jason Perillo was reelected to his eighth term after running unopposed. He had represented the 113th district since 2007, when he won the special election to succeed Republican Richard Belden, who resigned.

2022 Connecticut State House of Representatives election, 113th District
Party	Candidate	Votes	%
Republican	Jason Perillo (incumbent)	7,089	100.00%
Total votes		7,089	100.00%
Republican hold			

=== District 114 ===
Democratic incumbent Mary Welander was reelected to her second term after defeating Republican Daniel Cowan. Welander was also nominated by the Independent Party and the Working Families Party. She had represented the 114th district since 2021.

2022 Connecticut State House of Representatives election, 114th District
Party	Candidate	Votes	%
Democratic	Mary Welander (incumbent)	5,665	55.37%
Republican	Daniel Cowan	4,320	42.22%
Independent Party	Mary Welander (incumbent)	132	1.29%
Working Families	Mary Welander (incumbent)	115	1.12%
Total votes		10,232	100.00%
Democratic hold			

=== District 115 ===
Democratic incumbent Dorinda Keenan Borer was reelected to a third term after running unopposed. She had represented the 115th district since 2017, when she won the special election to fill the vacancy left by Democrat Stephen Dargan, who resigned.

2022 Connecticut State House of Representatives election, 115th District
Party	Candidate	Votes	%
Democratic	Dorinda Keenan Borer (incumbent)	4,006	100.00%
Total votes		4,006	100.00%
Democratic hold			

=== District 116 ===
Democratic incumbent Treneé McGee was reelected to a first full term after defeating Republican candidate Aaron Haley and Independent candidate Shawn Brown. McGee had represented the 116th district since 2021, when she won the special election to succeed Democrat Michael DiMassa, who was arrested for wire fraud and had represented the 116th district since 2016.

2022 Connecticut State House of Representatives election, 116th District
Party	Candidate	Votes	%
Democratic	Treneé McGee (incumbent)	2,513	68.01%
Republican	Aaron Haley	1,084	29.34%
Independent Party	Shawn A. Brown	98	2.65%
Total votes		3,695	100.00%
Democratic hold			

=== District 117 ===
Republican incumbent Charles Ferraro was reelected to 10th term after defeating Working Families Party Candidate Laura Fucci. Ferraro was also nominated by the Independent Party. He had represented the 117th district since 2015.

2022 Connecticut State House of Representatives election, 117th District
Party	Candidate	Votes	%
Republican	Charles Ferraro (incumbent)	6,423	73.99%
Independent Party	Charles Ferraro (incumbent)	425	4.90%
Working Families	Laura A. Fucci	1,833	21.12%
Total votes		8,681	100.00%
Republican hold			

=== District 118 ===
Democratic incumbent Frank Smith was reelected to a second term after defeating Republican Jeffrey Parkin. Smith was also nominated by the Working Families Party. He had represented the 118th district since 2021.

2022 Connecticut State House of Representatives election, 118th District
Party	Candidate	Votes	%
Democratic	Frank Smith (incumbent)	5,130	53.84%
Republican	Jeffrey R. Parkin	4,113	43.17%
Independent Party	Jeffrey R. Parkin	110	1.15%
Working Families	Frank Smith (incumbent)	175	1.84%
Total votes		9,528	100.00%
Democratic hold			

=== District 119 ===
Republican incumbent Kathy Kennedy was reelected to a third term after defeating Democratic candidate Mike Smith. Kennedy was also nominated by the Independent Party. She had represented the 119th district since 2019.

2022 Connecticut State House of Representatives election, 119th District
Party	Candidate	Votes	%
Republican	Kathy Kennedy (incumbent)	5,618	51.45%
Democratic	Mike Smith	5,070	46.43%
Independent Party	Kathy Kennedy (incumbent)	122	1.12%
Working Families	Mike Smith	109	1.00%
Total votes		10,919	100.00%
Republican hold			

=== District 120 ===
Republican candidate Laura Dancho was elected after defeating Democratic incumbent Philip Young. Dancho was also nominated by the Independent Party. This seat was previously held by Democrat Philip Young since 2018.

2022 Connecticut State House of Representatives election, 120th District
Party	Candidate	Votes	%
Democratic	Philip Young (incumbent)	4,550	49.40%
Republican	Laura Dancho	4,529	49.17%
Independent Party	Laura Dancho	131	1.42%
Total votes		9,210	100.00%
Republican gain from Democratic			

=== District 121 ===
Democratic incumbent Joe Gresko was reelected to a fourth term after defeating Republican Greg Burnes. Gresko had represented the 121st district since 2017.

2022 Connecticut State House of Representatives election, 121st District
Party	Candidate	Votes	%
Democratic	Joe Gresko (incumbent)	4,106	65.16%
Republican	Greg W. Burnes	2,195	34.84%
Total votes		6,301	100.00%
Democratic hold			

=== District 122 ===
Republican incumbent Ben McGorty was reelected to a fifth term after running unopposed. He had represented the 122nd district since 2015.

2022 Connecticut State House of Representatives election, 122nd District
Party	Candidate	Votes	%
Republican	Ben McGorty (incumbent)	7,165	100.00%
Total votes		7,165	100.00%
Republican hold			

=== District 123 ===
Republican incumbent David Rutigliano was reelected to a sixth term after defeating Democratic candidate Sujata Wilcox. Rutigliano was also nominated by the Independent Party. He had represented the 123rd district since 2013.

2022 Connecticut State House of Representatives election, 123rd District
Party	Candidate	Votes	%
Republican	David Rutigliano (incumbent)	5,491	52.09%
Democratic	Sujata Gadkar-Wilcox	4,882	46.31%
Independent Party	David Rutigliano (incumbent)	168	1.59%
Total votes		10,541	100.00%
Republican hold			

=== District 124 ===
Democratic incumbent Andre Baker was reelected to a fifth term after defeating Republican candidate Jose Quiroga and Independent candidate Michael Young. Baker had represented the 124th district since 2015.

2022 Connecticut State House of Representatives election, 124th District
Party	Candidate	Votes	%
Democratic	Andre Baker (incumbent)	2,218	84.46%
Republican	Jose L. Quiroga	358	13.63%
Independent Party	Michael J. Young	50	1.90%
Total votes		2,626	100.00%
Democratic hold			

=== District 125 ===
Republican incumbent Tom O'Dea was reelected to a sixth term after defeating Democratic candidate Victor Alvarez. O'Dea had represented the 125th district since 2013.

2022 Connecticut State House of Representatives election, 125th District
Party	Candidate	Votes	%
Republican	Tom O'Dea (incumbent)	5,805	53.63%
Democratic	Victor Alvarez	5,019	46.37%
Total votes		10,824	100.00%
Republican hold			

=== District 126 ===
Democratic candidate Fred Gee was elected after defeating Republican candidate Phillip Flynn and Independent candidate Joseph Thompson. This seat was previously held by Democrat Charlie Stallworth, who had represented the 126th district since 2011.

2022 Connecticut State House of Representatives election, 126th District
Party	Candidate	Votes	%
Democratic	Fred Gee	3,240	77.29%
Republican	Philip E. Flynn	789	18.82%
United Community Party	Joseph D. Thompson	163	3.89%
Total votes		4,192	100.00%
Democratic hold			

=== District 127 ===
Democratic candidate Marcus Brown was elected after defeating Republican candidate Anthony Puccio and Working Families candidate Jack Hennessy. This seat was previously held by Jack Hennessy, who had represented the 127th district since 2005.

2022 Connecticut State House of Representatives election, 127th District
Party	Candidate	Votes	%
Democratic	Marcus Brown	2,321	63.59%
Republican	Anthony L. Puccio	1,017	27.86%
Working Families	Jack Hennessy (incumbent)	312	8.55%
Total votes		3,470	100.00%
Democratic hold			

=== District 128 ===
Democratic incumbent Christopher Rosario was reelected to fifth term after defeating Republican Ramona Marquez. Rosario was also nominated by the Independent Party. He had represented the 128th district since 2015.

2022 Connecticut State House of Representatives election, 128th District
Party	Candidate	Votes	%
Democratic	Christopher Rosario (incumbent)	1,223	82.86%
Republican	Ramona Marquez	229	15.51%
Independent Party	Christopher Rosario (incumbent)	24	1.63%
Total votes		1,476	100.00%
Democratic hold			

=== District 129 ===
Democratic incumbent Steven Stafstrom was reelected to a fourth term after defeating Republican Louis Savino. Stafstrom had represented the 129th district since 2015, when he was elected in a special election to succeed Democrat Auden Grogins, who had resigned.

2022 Connecticut State House of Representatives election, 129th District
Party	Candidate	Votes	%
Democratic	Steven Stafstrom (incumbent)	3,010	78.02%
Republican	Louis T. Savino	848	21.98%
Total votes		3,858	100.00%
Democratic hold			

=== District 130 ===
Democratic incumbent Antonio Felipe was reelected to a second term after defeating Republican candidate Terrence Sullivan. Felipe had represented the 130th district since 2019, when he was elected in a special election to succeed Democrat Ezequiel Santiago, who had died.

2022 Connecticut State House of Representatives election, 130th District
Party	Candidate	Votes	%
Democratic	Antonio Felipe (incumbent)	1,793	83.82%
Republican	Terrence A. Sullivan	346	16.18%
Total votes		2,139	100.00%
Democratic hold			

=== District 131 ===
Republican incumbent David Labriola was reelected to an 11th term after running unopposed. He had represented the 131st district since 2003.

2022 Connecticut State House of Representatives election, 131st District
Party	Candidate	Votes	%
Republican	David Labriola (incumbent)	7,638	100.00%
Total votes		7,638	100.00%
Republican hold			

=== District 132 ===
Democratic incumbent Jennifer Leeper was reelected to a second term after defeating Republican candidate Brian Farnen. Leeper had represented the 132nd district since 2021.

2022 Connecticut State House of Representatives election, 132nd District
Party	Candidate	Votes	%
Democratic	Jennifer Leeper (incumbent)	5,654	55.34%
Republican	Brian Farnen	4,435	43.40%
Independent Party	Brian Farnen	129	1.26%
Total votes		10,218	100.00%
Democratic hold			

=== District 133 ===
Democratic incumbent Cristin McCarthy Vahey was reelected to a fifth term after defeating Republican candidate Micheal Grant. Vahey was also nominated by the Working Families Party. She had represented the 133rd district since 2015.

2022 Connecticut State House of Representatives election, 133rd District
Party	Candidate	Votes	%
Democratic	Cristin McCarthy Vahey (incumbent)	5,512	60.91%
Republican	Michael Grant	3,259	36.02%
Independent Party	Michael Grant	107	1.18%
Working Families	Cristin McCarthy Vahey (incumbent)	171	1.89%
Total votes		9,049	100.00%
Democratic hold			

=== District 134 ===
Democratic candidate Sarah Keitt was elected after narrowly defeating Republican candidate Meghan McCloat. McCloat was also nominated by the Independent Party. The 134th district was previously represented by Republican Laura Devlin since 2015.

2022 Connecticut State House of Representatives election, 134th District
Party	Candidate	Votes	%
Democratic	Sarah Keitt	5,143	50.07%
Republican	Meghan McCloat	5,003	48.71%
Independent Party	Meghan McCloat	126	1.23%
Total votes		10,272	100.00%
Democratic gain from Republican			

=== District 135 ===
Democratic incumbent Anne Hughes was reelected to a third term after defeating Republican candidate Alex Burns. Hughes had represented the 135th district since 2019.

2022 Connecticut State House of Representatives election, 135th District
Party	Candidate	Votes	%
Democratic	Anne Hughes (incumbent)	6,712	61.56%
Republican	Alex Burns	4,191	38.44%
Total votes		10,903	100.0%
Democratic hold			

=== District 136 ===
Democratic incumbent Jonathan Steinberg was reelected to his seventh term after defeating Republican candidate Alma Sarelli. Steinberg had represented the 136th district since 2010.

2022 Connecticut State House of Representatives election, 136th District
Party	Candidate	Votes	%
Democratic	Jonathan Steinberg (incumbent)	7,294	69.01%
Republican	Alma Sarelli	3,276	30.99%
Total votes		10,570	100.00%
Democratic hold			

=== District 137 ===
Democratic candidate Kadeem Roberts was elected after defeating Republican candidate Luis Estrella. Roberts was also nominated by the Working Families Party. This seat was previously held by Democrat Chris Perone, who had represented the 137th district since 2005.

2022 Connecticut State House of Representatives election, 137th District
Party	Candidate	Votes	%
Democratic	Kadeem Roberts	3,863	62.61%
Republican	Luis G. Estrella	2,147	34.80%
Working Families	Kadeem Roberts	160	2.59%
Total votes		6,170	100.00%
Democratic hold			

=== District 138 ===
Republican candidate Rachel Chaleski was elected after defeating Democratic incumbent Ken Gucker. Chaleski was also nominated by the Independent Party. This seat was previously held by Democrat Kenneth Gucker since 2019.

2022 Connecticut State House of Representatives election, 138th District
Party	Candidate	Votes	%
Democratic	Kenneth Gucker (incumbent)	3,322	49.81%
Republican	Rachel Chaleski	3,219	48.26%
Independent Party	Rachel Chaleski	129	1.93%
Total votes		6,670	100.00%
Republican gain from Democratic			

=== District 139 ===
Democratic incumbent Kevin Ryan was reelected to his 16th term after defeating Republican candidate Mark Adams. Ryan was also nominated by the Independent Party and Working Families Party. He had represented the 139th district since 1993.

2022 Connecticut State House of Representatives election, 139th District
Party	Candidate	Votes	%
Democratic	Kevin Ryan (incumbent)	3,918	50.12%
Republican	Mark Adams	3,672	46.97%
Independent Party	Kevin Ryan (incumbent)	101	1.29%
Working Families	Kevin Ryan (incumbent)	127	1.62%
Total votes		8,064	100.00%
Democratic hold			

=== District 140 ===
Democratic incumbent Travis Simms was reelected to a third term after running unopposed. He had represented the 140th district since 2019.

2022 Connecticut State House of Representatives election, 140th District
Party	Candidate	Votes	%
Democratic	Travis Simms (incumbent)	3,061	100.00%
Total votes		3,061	100.00%
Democratic hold			

=== District 141 ===
Republican candidate Tracy Marra was elected after running unopposed. Marra was also nominated by the Independent Party. This seat was previously held by Republican Terrie Wood since 2009 before she retired to run for Connecticut Secretary of State.

2022 Connecticut State House of Representatives election, 141st District
Party	Candidate	Votes	%
Republican	Tracy Marra	5,825	86.84%
Independent Party	Tracy Marra	883	13.16%
Total votes		6,708	100.00%
Republican hold			

=== District 142 ===
Democratic incumbent Lucy Dathan was reelected to a third term after defeating Republican candidate Donald Mastronardi. Dathan was also nominated by the Working Families Party. She had represented the 142nd district since 2019.

2022 Connecticut State House of Representatives election, 142nd District
Party	Candidate	Votes	%
Democratic	Lucy Dathan (incumbent)	5,202	57.90%
Republican	Donald Mastronardi	3,453	38.43%
Independent Party	Donald Mastronardi	162	1.80%
Working Families	Lucy Dathan (incumbent)	167	1.86%
Total votes		8,979	100.00%
Democratic hold			

=== District 143 ===
Democratic candidate Dominique Johnson was elected after defeating Republican Nicole Hampton. Johnson was also nominated by the Working Families Party. The seat was previously held by Democrat Stephanie Thomas, who was elected Connecticut Secretary of State in 2022.

2022 Connecticut State House of Representatives election, 143rd District
Party	Candidate	Votes	%
Democratic	Dominique Johnson	5,359	56.68%
Republican	Nicole Hampton	3,797	40.16%
Independent Party	Nicole Hampton	150	1.59%
Working Families	Dominique Johnson	149	1.58%
Total votes		9,455	100.00%
Democratic hold			

=== District 144 ===
Democratic incumbent Hubert Delany was reelected to his first full term after defeating Republican Mitchell Bell. Delany had represented the 144th district since 2022, when he was elected in a special election to succeed Democrat Caroline Simmons, who resigned to become mayor of Stamford.

2022 Connecticut State House of Representatives election, 144th District
Party	Candidate	Votes	%
Democratic	Hubert Delany (incumbent)	4,381	64.33%
Republican	Mitchell Bell	2,429	35.67%
Total votes		8,762	100.00%
Democratic hold			

=== District 145 ===
Democratic incumbent Corey Paris was reelected to his first full term after defeating Republican Fritz Blau, the chairman of the Stamford Republican party. Paris was also nominated by the Working Families Party. Paris had represented the 145th district since 2022, when he was elected in a special election to succeed Patricia Billie Miller, who was elected to the State Senate.

2022 Connecticut State House of Representatives election, 145th District
Party	Candidate	Votes	%
Democratic	Corey Paris (incumbent)	2,687	73.86%
Republican	Fritz Blau	898	24.68%
Working Families	Corey Paris (incumbent)	53	1.46%
Total votes		3,638	100.00%
Democratic hold			

=== District 146 ===
Democratic incumbent David Michel was reelected to a third term after defeating Republican Jessica Demmo and Independent Thomas Concannon. Michel was also nominated by the Working Families Party. He had represented the 146th district since 2019.

2022 Connecticut State House of Representatives election, 146th District
Party	Candidate	Votes	%
Democratic	David Michel (incumbent)	3,185	61.77%
Republican	Jessica Demmo	1,717	33.30%
Independent Party	Thomas Concannon	174	3.37%
Working Families	David Michel (incumbent)	80	1.55%
Total votes		6,624	100.00%
Democratic hold			

=== District 147 ===
Democratic incumbent Matt Blumenthal was reelected to a third term after defeating Republican Abraham Viera. Blumenthal had represented the 147th district since 2019.

2022 Connecticut State House of Representatives election, 147th District
Party	Candidate	Votes	%
Democratic	Matt Blumenthal (incumbent)	5,265	60.19%
Republican	Abraham David Viera	3,482	39.81%
Total votes		8,747	100.00%
Democratic hold			

=== District 148 ===
Democratic incumbent Dan Fox was reelected to a sixth term after defeating Republican Wilm E. Donath. Fox however resigned at the end of 2022 to accept a nomination from Connecticut Governor Ned Lamont to be a judge on the Connecticut Superior Court. Democrat Anabel Figueroa was elected to succeed him on February 28, 2023.

2022 Connecticut State House of Representatives election, 148th District
Party	Candidate	Votes	%
Democratic	Dan Fox (incumbent)	3,328	67.60%
Republican	Wilm E. Donath	1,595	32.40%
Total votes		4,923	100.00%
Democratic hold			

=== District 149 ===
Democratic candidate Rachel Khanna was elected after defeating Republican incumbent Kimberly Fiorello. Khanna was also nominated by the Independent Party. This seat was previously held by Republican Kimberly Fiorello since 2021. This was the first time a Democrat was elected to this district.

2022 Connecticut State House of Representatives election, 149th District
Party	Candidate	Votes	%
Democratic	Rachel Khanna	5,243	49.97%
Republican	Kimberly Fiorello (incumbent)	5,141	49.00%
Independent Party	Rachel Khanna	108	1.03%
Total votes		10,492	100.00%
Democratic gain from Republican			

=== District 150 ===
Democratic incumbent Steve Meskers won reelection to a third term, defeating Republican Ed Lopez. Meskers had represented the 150th District since 2019.

2022 Connecticut State House of Representatives election, 150th District
Party	Candidate	Votes	%
Democratic	Steve Meskers (incumbent)	5,005	58.85%
Republican	Ed J. Lopez	3,500	41.15%
Total votes		8,505	100.00%
Democratic hold			

=== District 151 ===
Democratic candidate Hector Arzeno was elected after defeating Republican candidate Peter Sherr. This seat was previously held by Republican Harry Arora since 2020.

2022 Connecticut State House of Representatives election, 151st District
Party	Candidate	Votes	%
Democratic	Hector Arzeno	5,574	53.50%
Republican	Peter Sherr	4,845	46.50%
Total votes		10,419	100.00%
Democratic gain from Republican			

== See also ==
- 2022 Connecticut elections
- 2022 Connecticut State Senate election
- 2022 United States House of Representatives elections in Connecticut
