= Laura Hoydick =

American politician

Mayor of Stratford
- In office December 11, 2017 – December 8, 2025
- Preceded by: John A. Harkins
- Succeeded by: David Chess

Member of the Connecticut House of Representatives from the 120th district
- In office March 8, 2010 – January 2, 2018
- Preceded by: John A. Harkins
- Succeeded by: Philip Young

Personal details
- Born: June 20, 1960 (age 66) Stratford, Connecticut, U.S.
- Party: Republican

Laura Hoydick (born June 20, 1960) is an American politician who served as the Mayor of Stratford from 2017 to 2025. She previously served in the Connecticut House of Representatives from the 120th district from 2010 to 2018. On November 5, 2025, she was defeated in her quest for a third term as mayor by Democrat David Chess.
