= Linda Orange =

American politician (1950–2019)

Member of the Connecticut House of Representatives from the 48th district
- In office January 8, 1997 – November 20, 2019
- Succeeded by: Brian Smith

Deputy Speaker of the Connecticut House of Representatives
- In office January 2019 – November 20, 2019

Personal details
- Born: Linda Ann Smith; September 25, 1950 Hartford, Connecticut, U.S.
- Died: November 20, 2019 (aged 69) Middletown, Connecticut, U.S.
- Party: Democratic

Linda Ann Orange (née Smith; September 25, 1950 – November 20, 2019) was an American politician who was a Democratic member and deputy speaker of the Connecticut House of Representatives. Orange represented the 48th Assembly District, which consists of portions of Colchester, Lebanon, Mansfield, and Windham.

In 2014, Orange, who was endorsed by the NRA Political Victory Fund, faced a Democratic primary challenge over her stance on gun control.

Orange died from pancreatic cancer on November 20, 2019, at the age of 69.

== Electoral history ==
Connecticut House of Representatives: General Election 2014: 48th District
Party	Candidate	Votes	%
Democratic	Linda Orange	4,688	53.4
Working Families	Linda Orange	547	6.2
Total	Linda Orange (Incumbent)	5,235	59.6
Republican	Evan Evans	3,544	40.4
Total votes		8,779	100

Connecticut House of Representatives: Democratic Primary Election 2014: 48th District
Party	Candidate	Votes	%
Democratic	Linda Orange	724	69.8
Democratic	Jason Paul	313	30.2
Total votes		1,037	100

Connecticut House of Representatives: General Election 2012: 48th District
Party	Candidate	Votes	%
Democratic	Linda Orange	6,057	55.6
Working Families	Linda Orange	550	5.0
Total	Linda Orange (Incumbent)	6,607	60.6
Republican	Stan Soby	4,292	39.4
Total votes		10,899	100

Connecticut House of Representatives: General Election 2010: 48th District
Party	Candidate	Votes	%
Democratic	Linda Orange	4,759	49.4
Working Families	Linda Orange	225	2.3
Total	Linda Orange (Incumbent)	4,984	51.7
Republican	Joe Broder	4,650	48.3
Total votes		9,634	100

Connecticut House of Representatives: General Election 2008: 48th District
Party	Candidate	Votes	%
Democratic	Linda Orange	9,238	100
Total votes		9,238	100

Connecticut House of Representatives: General Election 2006: 48th District
Party	Candidate	Votes	%
Democratic	Linda Orange	6,776	100
Total votes		6,776	100
