= Connecticut's 127th House of Representatives district =

American legislative district

Connecticut's 127th State House of Representatives district
Representative
Marcus Brown; D

Connecticut's 127th House of Representatives district elects one member of the Connecticut House of Representatives. It encompasses parts of Bridgeport and has been represented by Democrat Marcus Brown since 2022.

== List of representatives ==
List of Representatives from Connecticut's 127th State House District
Representative	Party	Years	District home	Note
Albert Provenzano	Democratic	1967–1973	Bridgeport	Seat created
John D'Onofrio	Democratic	1973–1975	Bridgeport	
Matthew D. DelPercio	Democratic	1975–1977	Bridgeport	
Ferdinando DelPercio	Democratic	1977–1983	Bridgeport	
Anthony R. Innacell	Democratic	1983–1985	Bridgeport	
John M. Varrone	Republican	1985–1987	Bridgeport	
Jacqueline Cocco	Democratic	1987–2005	Bridgeport	
Jack Hennessy	Democratic	2005–2023	Bridgeport	
Marcus Brown	Democratic	2023–	Bridgeport	

== Recent elections ==
=== 2020 ===
2020 Connecticut State House of Representatives election, District 127
Party	Candidate	Votes	%
Democratic	John F. Hennessy (incumbent)	5,523	73.32
Republican	Peter Perillo	1,848	24.53
Petitioning	Robert T. Keeley Jr.	162	2.15
Total votes		7,533	100.00
Democratic hold			

=== 2018 ===
2018 Connecticut House of Representatives election, District 127
Party	Candidate	Votes	%
Democratic	Jack Hennessy (Incumbent)	4,081	75.3
Republican	Peter Perillo	1,341	24.7
Total votes		5,422	100.00
Democratic hold			

=== 2016 ===
2016 Connecticut House of Representatives election, District 127
Party	Candidate	Votes	%
Democratic	Jack Hennessy (Incumbent)	5,109	76.46
Republican	Ruben Coriano	1,573	23.54
Total votes		6,682	100.00
Democratic hold			

=== 2014 ===
2014 Connecticut House of Representatives election, District 127
Party	Candidate	Votes	%
Democratic	Jack Hennessy (Incumbent)	3,317	100.00
Total votes		3,317	100.00
Democratic hold			

=== 2012 ===
2012 Connecticut House of Representatives election, District 127
Party	Candidate	Votes	%
Democratic	Jack Hennessy (Incumbent)	4,992	79.5
Republican	Anthony Minutolo	1,290	20.5
Total votes		6,282	100.00
Democratic hold			
