= Bob Fernandez (politician) =

American politician

Member-elect of the Connecticut House of Representatives from the 48th district
- Assuming office January 2027
- Succeeding: Mark DeCaprio

Personal details
- Party: Democratic
- Website: Campaign website

Robert (Bob) Fernandez is an American politician. A member of the Democratic Party, he is the member-elect for the 48th district of the Connecticut House of Representatives. He was elected at the 2026 election. He is a veteran.
