= Connecticut's 120th House of Representatives district =

American legislative district

Connecticut's 120th State House of Representatives district
Representative
Kaitlyn Shake; D

Connecticut's 120th House of Representatives district elects one member of the Connecticut House of Representatives. It encompasses parts of Stratford and has been represented by Democrat Kaitlyn Shake since 2025.

== List of representatives ==
Representative	Party	Years	District home	Note
Robert H. Davis	Democratic	1967 – 1969	Milford	
Henry A. Povinelli	Republican	1969 – 1973	Devon	Unsuccessfully ran the United States House of Representatives in 1972
William J. Smyth	Republican	1973 – 1975	Stratford	Redistricted from the 129th District
Michael A. Turiano	Democratic	1975 – 1977	Stratford	
August A. Palmer, III	Republican	1977 – 1981	Stratford	
J. Vincent Chase	Republican	1981 – 1997	Stratford	
John A. Harkins	Republican	1997 – 2010	Stratford	Elected Mayor of Stratford
Laura Hoydick	Republican	2010 – 2018	Stratford	Elected Mayor of Stratford
Phil Young	Democratic	2018 – 2023	Stratford	
Laura Dancho	Republican	2023 – 2025	Stratford	
Kaitlyn Shake	Democratic	2025 – present	Stratford	

== Recent elections ==
=== 2020 ===
2020 Connecticut State House of Representatives election, District 120
Party	Candidate	Votes	%
Democratic	Philip L. Young (incumbent)	6,869	51.70
Republican	Jim Feehan	6,047	45.51
Independent Party	Jim Feehan	371	2.79
Total votes		13,287	100.00
Democratic hold			

=== 2018 ===
2018 Connecticut House of Representatives election, District 120
Party	Candidate	Votes	%
Democratic	Phil Young (Incumbent)	5,222	49.8
Republican	Jim Feehan	5,209	49.7
Petitioning	Prez Palmer	55	0.5
Total votes		10,486	100.00
Democratic hold			

=== 2018 special ===
2018 Connecticut House of Representatives special elections, District 120
Party	Candidate	Votes	%
Democratic	Phil Young	1,615	51
Republican	Bill Cabral	1,552	49
Total votes		3,167	100.00
Democratic hold			

=== 2016 ===
2016 Connecticut House of Representatives election, District 120
Party	Candidate	Votes	%
Republican	Laura Hoydick (Incumbent)	7,511	62.69
Democratic	Frederick Streets	4,470	37.31
Total votes		11,981	100.00
Republican hold			

=== 2014 ===
2014 Connecticut House of Representatives election, District 120
Party	Candidate	Votes	%
Republican	Laura Hoydick (Incumbent)	4,958	62.8
Democratic	Robert P. Bradley	2,665	33.8
Independent Party	Laura Hoydick (Incumbent)	273	3.5
Total votes		7,896	100.00
Republican hold			

=== 2012 ===
2012 Connecticut House of Representatives election, District 120
Party	Candidate	Votes	%
Republican	Laura Hoydick (Incumbent)	6,404	59.9
Democratic	Terry Masters	4,229	39.5
Petitioning	Clifton A. Price	65	0.6
Total votes		10,698	100.00
Republican hold			
