= Rebecca Martinez =

American politician

- Martinez speaking in 2026

Member of the Connecticut House of Representatives from the 22nd district
- Incumbent
- Assumed office January 8, 2025
- Preceded by: Francis Cooley

Personal details
- Born: 1981 (age 44–45)
- Party: Democratic
- Website: https://www.rebeccaforstaterep.com/

Rebecca Martinez (born 1981) is an American politician and member of the Connecticut House of Representatives since 2024 from the 22nd district, which consists of the town of Plainville and part of New Britain. Martinez is a member of the Plainville Board of Education. She also works as a nurse.
