= Jacqueline Cocco =

American politician (born 1933)

Member of the Connecticut House of Representatives from the 127th district
- In office January 7, 1987 – January 5, 2005
- Preceded by: John Varrone
- Succeeded by: Jack Hennessy

Personal details
- Born: December 8, 1933 (age 92) Bridgeport, Connecticut, U.S.
- Party: Democratic

Jacqueline Cocco (born December 8, 1933) is an American politician who served in the Connecticut House of Representatives from the 127th district from 1987 to 2005.
