= Claire Janowski =

American politician

Member of the Connecticut House of Representatives from the 56th district
- In office 2001–2017
- Preceded by: Thomasina Clemons
- Succeeded by: Mike Winkler

Personal details
- Party: Democratic
- Education: Manchester Community College (AS); Trinity College (BS)

Claire L. Janowski is an American politician who served as a member of the Connecticut House of Representatives for the 56th district from 2001 to 2017.

== Education ==
Janowski earned an associate degree in accounting from Manchester Community College and a Bachelor of Science in psychology from Trinity College.

== Career ==
Janowski began her political career at the local level in Vernon. She was active in the parent-teacher organization as well as the Little League Auxiliary before serving seven years each on the planning and zoning commission and the town council. Outside of politics, Janowski worked as a pension specialist for Aetna. She contested her first legislative election in 2000, and was seated to the Connecticut House of Representatives in January 2001. She did not stand in the 2016 elections, and left office in 2017.
