= Mary Fortier =

American politician

Member of the Connecticut House of Representatives from the 79th district
- Incumbent
- Assumed office January 4, 2023
- Preceded by: Chris Ziogas

Personal details
- Party: Democratic
- Education: Boston College (BA); Western New England University (JD)

Mary Fortier is an American politician, who is a Democratic member of the Connecticut House of Representatives from District 79 since 2023.
