= William Petit =

American physician and politician (born 1956)

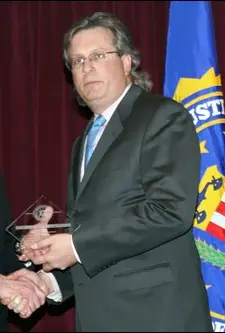
- Petit in 2008

Member of the Connecticut House of Representatives from the 22nd district
- In office January 4, 2017 – January 4, 2023
- Preceded by: Betty Boukus
- Succeeded by: Francis Cooley

Personal details
- Born: William Arthur Petit, Jr. September 24, 1956 (age 69) Southington, Connecticut, U.S.
- Party: Republican
- Spouses: Jennifer Hawke (m. 1985; died 2007) Christine Paluf (m. 2012; div. 2020)
- Children: 3 (2 deceased)

William A. Petit Jr. (born September 24, 1956) is an American former physician and politician. A Republican, he represented District 22 (Plainville and formerly part of New Britain) in the Connecticut House of Representatives from 2017 to 2023. A former physician, he was the sole survivor of the 2007 Cheshire home invasion, in which his wife and two daughters were murdered.

== Early life and education ==
Petit was born in Southington and grew up in Plainville, where his father had a general store and was on the school board and the town council as well as being a member of the Republican state central committee. After graduating from Plainville High School, he earned an undergraduate degree from Dartmouth College and a medical degree from the University of Pittsburgh School of Medicine, followed by a fellowship in endocrinology at the Yale University School of Medicine.

== Practice as a physician and home invasion ==
In 1989, Petit entered private practice in Plainville. In 1989, he also became medical director of the Joslin Diabetes Center at New Britain General Hospital, now a campus of The Hospital of Central Connecticut, and from 1994 to 2008 he served as Director of Public Health for Plainville.

On July 23, 2007, Petit's wife, Jennifer, and two daughters were murdered in a home invasion robbery and arson at their house in Cheshire. Mrs. Petit and one of her daughters were raped before their deaths. Despite serious injuries from a baseball bat, Petit escaped and was the only survivor.

== Philanthropy and advocacy ==
In the years following the loss of his family, Petit attended the trials of the two attackers who were later both convicted of murder, and devoted himself to philanthropy. In 2007, he founded the Petit Family Foundation, which supports education, especially of women in science; people affected by chronic illnesses (his wife had multiple sclerosis); and assistance to victims of violence. He also advocated for victims' rights and in defense of the death penalty.

In 2012, the Democratic-controlled state legislature of Connecticut and Governor Dannel Malloy abolished the death penalty for future crimes. 11 men remained on the state's death row until 2015, when the Connecticut Supreme Court ruled, by a vote of 4-3, in State v. Santiago, that applying the death penalty only for past cases was unconstitutional, thus ending the death penalty in Connecticut. The two attackers were subsequently re-sentenced to life without parole.

== Political career ==
In 2014, Petit, a Republican, considered running for Congress in the 5th district against then-freshman Democrat Elizabeth Esty, but decided against it. He also declined to run for the seat in 2018.

In the 2016 election, he won election to the Connecticut House of Representatives from the 22nd district, defeating 11-term incumbent Democrat Betty Boukus. He defeated Democrat Richard Ireland Jr. for his second term in 2018 and ran unopposed for reelection in 2020.

Petit declined to run for reelection in 2022.

== Personal life ==
On April 13, 1985, Petit married Jennifer Hawke (1958-2007), in Meadville, Pennsylvania with whom he had two daughters:

- Hayley Elizabeth Petit (October 15, 1989 - July 23, 2007)
- Michaela Rose Petit (November 17, 1995 - July 23, 2007)

Petit's daughters, Hayley and Michaela, were 17 and 11 when they and his wife Jennifer Hawke-Petit were murdered. In 2012, he remarried to Christine Paluf, a photographer whom he met when she volunteered for the Petit Foundation. They have a son:

- William Arthur Petit III (November 23, 2013)

Petit and his family reside in Farmington, Connecticut.

== Electoral history ==
=== 2016 ===
Connecticut's 22nd State house district election, 2016
| Party | Candidate | Votes | % |
|---|---|---|---|
| Total | William Petit | 6,359 | 60.1% |
| Republican | William Petit | 5,765 | 54.5% |
| Independent Party | William Petit | 594 | 5.6% |
| Democratic | Betty Boukas (incumbent) | 4,229 | 39.9% |
| Total votes | | 10,588 | 100.00% |
| Republican gain from Democratic | | | |

=== 2018 ===
Connecticut's 22nd State house district election, 2018
| Party | Candidate | Votes | % |
|---|---|---|---|
| Total | William Petit (incumbent) | 5,738 | 65.8% |
| Republican | William Petit (incumbent) | 5,297 | 60.7% |
| Independent Party | William Petit (incumbent) | 441 | 5.1% |
| Democratic | Richard Ireland Jr. | 2,989 | 34.3% |
| Total votes | | 8,727 | 100.00% |
| Republican hold | | | |

=== 2020 ===
Connecticut's 22nd State house district election, 2020
| Party | Candidate | Votes | % |
|---|---|---|---|
| Republican | William Petit (incumbent) | 7,005 | 79.6% |
| Independent Party | William Petit (incumbent) | 1,792 | 20.4% |
| Total votes | | 8,797 | 100.00% |
| Republican hold | | | |

== See also ==
- The Rising: Murder, Heartbreak, and the Power of Human Resilience in an American Town
