= Connecticut's 79th House of Representatives district =

American legislative district

Connecticut's 79th State House of Representatives district
Representative
Mary Fortier; D

Connecticut's 79th House of Representatives district elects one member of the Connecticut House of Representatives. It encompasses parts of Bristol and has been represented by Democrat Mary Fortier since 2023.

== List of representatives ==
List of Representatives from Connecticut's 79th State House District
Representative	Party	Years	District home	Note
Alfred J. Ring	Democratic	1967–1969	Meriden	Seat created
Edward L. Iwanicki	Democratic	1969–1973	Meriden	
Andrew R. Grande	Democratic	1973–1981	Bristol	
Gordon F. Strunk	Republican	1981–1983	Bristol	
Salvatore Micucci	Democratic	1983–1985	Bristol	
Craig P. Taylor	Republican	1985–1993	Bristol	
Kosta Diamantis	Democratic	1993–2007	Bristol	
Frank Nicastro	Democratic	2007–2017	Bristol	
Chris Ziogas	Democratic	2017–2023	Bristol	
Mary Fortier	Democratic	2023–	Bristol	

== Recent elections ==
=== 2020 ===
2020 Connecticut State House of Representatives election, District 79
Party	Candidate	Votes	%
Democratic	Christopher Ziogas (incumbent)	5,450	52.62
Republican	David Rackliffe	4,593	44.34
Independent Party	David Rackliffe	315	3.04
Total votes		10,358	100.00
Democratic hold			

=== 2018 ===
2018 Connecticut House of Representatives election, District 79
Party	Candidate	Votes	%
Democratic	Chris Ziogas (Incumbent)	3,927	54.0
Republican	David Rackliffe	3,339	46.0
Total votes		7,266	100.00
Democratic hold			

=== 2016 ===
2016 Connecticut House of Representatives election, District 79
Party	Candidate	Votes	%
Democratic	Chris Ziogas	4,785	54.15
Republican	Peter Del Mastro	4,052	45.85
Total votes		8,837	100.00
Democratic hold			

=== 2014 ===
2014 Connecticut House of Representatives election, District 79
Party	Candidate	Votes	%
Democratic	Frank Nicastro (Incumbent)	3,324	58.2
Republican	Joshua M. Levesque	2,168	38.0
Independent Party	Joshua M. Levesque	220	3.9
Total votes		5,712	100.00
Democratic hold			

=== 2012 ===
2012 Connecticut House of Representatives election, District 79
Party	Candidate	Votes	%
Democratic	Frank Nicastro (Incumbent)	5,268	66.6
Republican	Mary L. Alford	2,640	33.4
Total votes		7,908	100.00
Democratic hold			
