= Connecticut's 126th House of Representatives district =

American legislative district

Connecticut's 126th State House of Representatives district
Representative
Fred Gee; D

Connecticut's 126th House of Representatives district elects one member of the Connecticut House of Representatives. It encompasses parts of Bridgeport and has been represented by Democrat Fred Gee since 2022.

== List of representatives ==
List of Representatives from Connecticut's 126th State House District
Representative	Party	Years	District home	Note
Gerard S. Spiegel	Republican	1967–1973	Trumbull	Seat created
Frank J. Tedesco	Republican	1973–1975	Bridgeport	
Raymond C. Lyddy	Democratic	1975–1977	Bridgeport	
Vincent A. Roberti	Democratic	1977–1983	Bridgeport	
Robert T. Keeley Jr.	Democratic	1983–1991	Bridgeport	
Christopher L. Caruso	Democratic	1991–2013	Bridgeport	
Charlie Stallworth	Democratic	2013–2023	Bridgeport	
Fred Gee	Democratic	2023–	Bridgeport	

== Recent elections ==
=== 2020 ===
2020 Connecticut State House of Representatives election, District 126
Party	Candidate	Votes	%
Democratic	Charlie Stallworth (incumbent)	7,254	82.53
Republican	Lee V. Grisby II	1,535	17.47
Total votes		8,789	100.00
Democratic hold			

=== 2018 ===
2018 Connecticut House of Representatives election, District 126
Party	Candidate	Votes	%
Democratic	Charlie Stallworth (Incumbent)	5,362	84.3
Republican	Manuel Bataguas	997	15.7
Total votes		6,359	100.00
Democratic hold			

=== 2016 ===
2016 Connecticut House of Representatives election, District 126
Party	Candidate	Votes	%
Democratic	Charlie Stallworth (Incumbent)	6,335	83.34
Republican	Anthony Pizighelli	1,266	16.66
Total votes		7,601	100.00
Democratic hold			

=== 2014 ===
2014 Connecticut House of Representatives election, District 126
Party	Candidate	Votes	%
Democratic	Charlie Stallworth (Incumbent)	3,645	100.00
Total votes		3,645	100.00
Democratic hold			

=== 2012 ===
2012 Connecticut House of Representatives election, District 126
Party	Candidate	Votes	%
Democratic	Charlie Stallworth (Incumbent)	6,353	87.6
Republican	Anthony Pizighelli	896	12.4
Total votes		7,249	100.00
Democratic hold			
