= Kaitlyn Shake =

American politician

Member of the Connecticut House of Representatives from the 120th district
- Incumbent
- Assumed office January 8, 2025
- Preceded by: Laura Dancho

Personal details
- Party: Democratic Party

Kaitlyn Shake is an American politician and member of the Connecticut House of Representatives since 2025 from the 120th district, which consists of parts of Stratford. She unseated incumbent Republican Laura Dancho. Shake has worked as a nurse and served on the Stratford Town Council in Districts 2 (2019-2023) and 7 (2023-2025) following a controversial redistricting plan in 2023. Shake served as minority leader for the Democratic caucus while on the Town Council.
