= Chris Ziogas =

American politician

Member of the Connecticut House of Representatives from the 79th district
- In office January 2017 – January 2023
- Preceded by: Frank Nicastro
- Succeeded by: Mary Fortier

Personal details
- Born: 1949 or 1950
- Party: Democratic

Christopher Ziogas (born 1949 or 1950) is an American former politician and attorney. A member of the Democratic Party, he served as a member of the Connecticut House of Representatives from the 79th district, representing Bristol, from January 2017 to January 2023. His political career ended following his federal indictment and subsequent guilty plea in 2025 for his role in a conspiracy to interfere with a state audit of a Medicaid provider.

== Early life and career ==
Ziogas worked as an attorney and a financial broker. In November 2025, the Financial Industry Regulatory Authority (FINRA) barred him for failing to provide information and documents related to his federal indictment.

=== Political career ===
Ziogas was elected to the Connecticut House of Representatives in 2016 and took office in January 2017, succeeding Frank Nicastro. He served three terms representing the 79th Assembly District in Bristol before leaving the legislature in January 2023. He was succeeded by Mary Fortier in 2022.

== Federal Indictment and guilty plea ==
In February 2025, a federal grand jury in New Haven returned an 18-count indictment against Ziogas and former Connecticut Deputy Secretary of the Office of Policy and Management (OPM), Konstantinos "Kosta" Diamantis. The charges stemmed from a scheme to cancel a state audit into Medicaid overbilling by Helen Zervas, an optometrist, owner of Family Eye Care in Bristol, and Ziogas's fiancée.

According to court documents, in January 2020, the Connecticut Department of Social Services (DSS) notified Zervas it would audit her Medicaid billing. Knowing she had fraudulently overbilled Medicaid for services not provided or medically necessary, Zervas sought help from Ziogas to prevent the audit. Ziogas then enlisted Diamantis, who used his position as a senior OPM official to pressure DSS officials.

In exchange for official acts aimed at canceling the audit, Ziogas and Zervas made corrupt payments to Diamantis totaling $95,000. The payments were funneled through Ziogas. On March 4, 2020 Ziogas made a $20,000 bribe payment to Diamantis. The same day, Zervas's attorney emailed DSS a settlement offer. Subsequently he made payments of $10,000 and $65,000. The audit of Family Eye Care was reportedly the only one canceled by DSS over a five-year period.

=== Bank fraud and false statements ===
Separately, Ziogas pleaded guilty to bank fraud for preparing a $5,500 check from a client trust account he managed, made payable to Diamantis, in November 2019. He also admitted to making false statements to federal agents during their investigation.

On November 26, 2025, Ziogas pleaded guilty in U.S. District Court in New Haven to conspiracy to commit extortion under color of official right, making false statements, and bank fraud. During the plea hearing, he stated, "I participated in a scheme with Helen and Kosta to try and have him suppress some activity in Medicaid charges that she was facing... we paid him to help influence the outcome of the audit".

Under a plea agreement, he faces a sentencing guidelines range of 70 to 87 months in prison. His sentencing is scheduled for February 18, 2025. Legal analysts noted his guilty plea could position him as a witness for the prosecution in the upcoming trial of his co-defendant, Konstantinos Diamantis.

== Personal life ==
Ziogas resides in Bristol, Connecticut. He was engaged to Helen Zervas, a co-defendant in the case. He and Diamantis had a long-standing association; Ziogas previously represented Diamantis's daughter in a separate state investigation, despite not holding a law license at the time.
