= Connecticut's 32nd House of Representatives district =

American legislative district

Connecticut's 32nd State House of Representatives district
Representative
Christie Carpino; R

Connecticut's 32nd House of Representatives district elects one member of the Connecticut House of Representatives. It consists of the towns of Cromwell and Portland. It has been represented by Republican Christie Carpino since 2011.

== List of representatives ==
List of Representatives from Connecticut's 32nd State House District
Representative	Party	Years	District home	Note
Julius D. Morris	Democratic	1967–1973	New Britain	Seat created
Joseph S. Coatsworth	Democratic	1973–1981	Cromwell	
John B. Keefe	Democratic	1981–1985	Portland	
Robert F. Jahn	Republican	1985–1987	Cromwell	
Vincent C. Mazzotta	Democratic	1987–1991	Portland	
Jim O'Rourke	Democratic	1991–2011	Cromwell	
Christie Carpino	Republican	2011–	Cromwell	

== Recent elections ==
=== 2020 ===
2020 Connecticut State House of Representatives election, District 32
Party	Candidate	Votes	%
Republican	Christie Carpino (incumbent)	8,524	77.50
Independent Party	Christie Carpino (incumbent)	2,475	22.50
Total votes		10,999	100.00
Republican hold			

=== 2018 ===
2018 Connecticut House of Representatives election, District 32
Party	Candidate	Votes	%
Republican	Christie Carpino (Incumbent)	6,584	57.2
Democratic	Laurel Steinhauser	4,921	42.8
Total votes		11.505	100.00
Republican hold			

=== 2016 ===
2016 Connecticut House of Representatives election, District 32
Party	Candidate	Votes	%
Republican	Christie Carpino (Incumbent)	8,263	65.28
Democratic	Laurel Steinhauser	4,395	34.72
Total votes		12,658	100.00
Republican hold			

=== 2014 ===
2014 Connecticut House of Representatives election, District 32
Party	Candidate	Votes	%
Republican	Christie Carpino (Incumbent)	5,496	58.8
Democratic	Kathleen G. Richards	3,573	38.2
Working Families	Kathleen G. Richards	276	3.0
Total votes		9,345	100.00
Republican hold			

=== 2012 ===
2012 Connecticut House of Representatives election, District 32
Party	Candidate	Votes	%
Republican	Christie Carpino (Incumbent)	6,256	54.0
Democratic	Christopher Phelps	5,323	46.0
Total votes		11,579	100.00
Republican hold			
