= Eugene Millerick =

American politician (1924–2013)

Member of the Connecticut House of Representatives from the 22nd district
- In office 1987–1995
- Preceded by: Pauline R. Kezer
- Succeeded by: Betty Boukus

Personal details
- Born: July 29, 1924 Plainville, Connecticut, U.S.
- Died: May 5, 2013 (aged 88) Plainville, Connecticut, U.S.
- Party: Democratic

Eugene Joseph "Gene" Millerick (July 29, 1924 – May 5, 2013) was an American politician and businessman.

Born in Plainville, Connecticut, he served in the United States Army Air Forces during World War II and went to Clemson University. He was in the real estate and insurance businesses. He served in the Connecticut House of Representatives from 1987 to 1995 as a Democrat.
