= Betty Boukus =

American politician (1943–2016)

Member of the Connecticut House of Representatives from the 22nd district
- In office 1995 – December 2, 2016
- Preceded by: Eugene Millerick
- Succeeded by: William Petit

Personal details
- Born: Elizabeth Ann Castiola; April 16, 1943 New Britain, Connecticut, U.S.
- Died: December 2, 2016 (aged 73) Plainville, Connecticut, U.S.
- Party: Democratic
- Spouse: Gary M. Boukus Sr.
- Children: 2
- Education: Mount Saint Mary College; Central Connecticut State University (B.S.); University of Hartford (MA)

Elizabeth Ann "Betty" Boukus (April 16, 1943 – December 2, 2016) was an American politician who served in the Connecticut House of Representatives from 1995 to 2016, representing the 22nd district as a Democrat.

== Personal life ==
Elizabeth Ann Castiola was born on April 16, 1943, in New Britain, Connecticut. She attended Central Connecticut State University, where she earned a bachelor's degree in education, and University of Hartford, where she earned a master's degree. She was married to Gary M. Boukus Sr., and they had two children.

== Political career ==
Prior to her election to the Connecticut House of Representatives, Boukus served as a member of the Plainville Town Council.

Boukus was first elected to the Connecticut House of Representatives in 1994 and served until her death in 2016, representing the 22nd district as a Democrat. She had run for reelection in 2016, but was defeated by Republican candidate William Petit, who succeeded her in January 2017.

While serving in the House of Representatives, Boukus led a campaign to fund a statue of Prudence Crandall at the Connecticut State Capitol. The statue was erected in 2008.

== Death ==
Boukus died of cancer on December 2, 2016, in Plainville, Connecticut. Governor Dannel Malloy ordered state flags to be lowered to half-staff in her honor, and the Connecticut General Assembly passed a resolution expressing sympathy on her death.
