= Chet Morgan (politician) =

American politician (1937–2018)

Member of the Connecticut House of Representatives from the 56th district
- In office 1977–1983
- Preceded by: Martin B. Burke
- Succeeded by: Robert B. Hurd

Personal details
- Born: May 18, 1937 Manchester, Connecticut, U.S.
- Died: July 14, 2018 (aged 81) Manchester, Connecticut, U.S.
- Party: Democratic

Chester W. "Chet" Morgan (May 18, 1937 – July 14, 2018) was an American politician who served in the Connecticut House of Representatives from 1977 to 1983, representing the 56th district as a Democrat.

== Personal life ==
Morgan was born in Manchester, Connecticut, on May 18, 1937, to parents Chester E. Morgan and Joanne, née Way. After graduating from Manchester High School in 1955, he married Sylvia McCarthy in 1957. The couple moved to Vernon in 1960, where they raised a family. Morgan enlisted in the Connecticut Army National Guard, serving thirty years and attaining the rank of sergeant major.

== Political career ==
Morgan was first elected to the Connecticut House of Representatives in 1976, remaining in office until 1983. Morgan then served two terms on the city council and worked for the Connecticut Department of Public Utility Control in the 1990s. Morgan resigned from his position on the municipal zoning and planning commission in 2001 to contest the Vernon mayoralty. Outside of public and military service, Morgan worked for Pratt & Whitney and Kaman Aerospace.

Morgan died at Manchester Memorial Hospital on July 14, 2018, aged 81.
