= Thomasina Clemons =

American politician (born 1938)

Member of the Connecticut House of Representatives from the 56th district
- In office January 4, 1995 – January 3, 2001
- Preceded by: Joe Courtney
- Succeeded by: Claire Janowski

Personal details
- Born: November 23, 1938 (age 87) Charleston, West Virginia, U.S.
- Party: Democratic

Thomasina Clemons (born November 23, 1938) is an American politician who served in the Connecticut House of Representatives from the 56th district from 1995 to 2001.
