= Jim O'Rourke (politician) =

American politician

Member of the Connecticut House of Representatives from the 32nd district
- In office January 7, 1991 – January 3, 2011
- Preceded by: Vincent C. Mazzotta
- Succeeded by: Christie Carpino

Personal details
- Party: Democratic

Jim O'Rourke is an American former politician who was a Democratic member of the Connecticut House of Representatives from 1991 to 2011. He represented the towns of Cromwell and Portland, as well as parts of Middletown from the 1990 election to the 2010 election. He was Deputy Speaker of the Connecticut House. He also served on the Energy and Technology; Finance, Revenue and Bonding, and Environment Committees.

O'Rourke is employed as a development director at a Middletown nonprofit social services agency. He is also active in various environmental and mountaineering groups.

== 2009 legal troubles ==
On the night of January 21, 2009, O'Rourke was allegedly involved in events related to the hypothermia death of a 41-year-old Rocky Hill woman. O'Rourke said the woman got in his car at a local bar and he tried to drive her home, but she got out of the car and planned to walk the rest of the way home. The woman was found dead by a cross country skier. Local police did not immediately charge O'Rourke with any crime related to this incident.

On April 30, 2009, The Hartford Courant reported local police were seeking to issue a warrant to charge O'Rourke with negligent homicide for his role in the incident. The following day, House Speaker Christopher Donovan announced he had suspended O'Rourke from his post as Deputy Speaker.

The state's attorney ultimately declined to prosecute O'Rourke for his role in this incident. However, in February 2010 the decedent's estate filed a wrongful death lawsuit against O'Rourke and the bar in which the incident occurred.
