= The Rising: Murder, Heartbreak, and the Power of Human Resilience in an American Town =

2015 book

- Author: Ryan D'Agostino
- Publisher: Crown
- Publication date: 2015
- ISBN: 9780804140164

The Rising: Murder, Heartbreak, and the Power of Human Resilience in an American Town is a 2015 non-fiction book by Ryan D'Agostino, published by Crown Publishers, about the Cheshire murders.

The book describes how William Petit, who survived the incident, took steps to overcome it. Publishers Weekly stated that the book does not have a lot of content about the murders nor about the perpetrators.

== Background ==
The author originated from West Hartford, Connecticut. In 2011 he wrote an article in Esquire about the incident, and as a journalist he attended the relevant criminal trials. He later became the editor of Popular Mechanics. He had been able to discuss matters with members of the Petit family and their friends.

== Reception ==
Publishers Weekly praised how the book described William Petit in a "three-dimensional" way.

Helen Ubinas of the Philadelphia Inquirer wrote that the book and the story of William Petit overcoming the incident were both "resonate".

A reviewer of the Associated Press stated that overall the book is "thought-provoking, insightful and highly compelling". The reviewer noted that the portrayals of the non-perpetrators were "perfect — kind, good, unfailingly generous."
