= 2022 Connecticut elections =

- November 8, 2022

The 2022 Connecticut elections were held on Tuesday, November 8, 2022. Primary elections were held on August 9, 2022.

== Federal ==
=== United States House of Representatives ===
Incumbent Democrats won re-election to all five Connecticut seats in the United States House of Representatives.

=== United States Senate ===
Incumbent Democratic U.S. Senator Richard Blumenthal won re-election against Republican Leora Levy.

== State ==
=== Executive ===
==== Governor ====
Incumbent Democratic governor Ned Lamont and lieutenant governor Susan Bysiewicz won re-election against Republicans Bob Stefanowski and Laura Devlin.

==== Attorney general ====
Incumbent Democratic attorney general William Tong won re-election against Republican Jessica Kordas.

==== Secretary of state ====
Democrat Stephanie Thomas won the election against Republican Dominic Rapini.

==== State Comptroller ====
Democrat Sean Scanlon won the election against Republican Mary Fay.

==== State treasurer ====
Democrat Erick Russell won the election against Republican Harry Arora.

=== Legislative ===
==== Connecticut House of Representatives ====
Democrats won 98 seats while Republicans won 53, expanding their majority by one seat.

==== Connecticut State Senate ====
Democrats won 24 seats while Republicans won 12, expanding their majority by one seat.

=== Constitutional amendment ===
Question 1 was a constitutional amendment proposition in Connecticut to authorize the state legislature to create a period of early voting for elections in the state of Connecticut. The amendment passed with 60.5% of the vote.

Question 1
Choice	Votes	%
For	687,385	60.53
Against	448,295	39.47
Total	1,135,680	100.00

Question 1 results by county Yes: 60–70%; 50–60%; No: 50–60%

Question 1 results by municipality Yes: 80–90%; 70–80%; 60–70%; 50–60%; No: 60–70%; 50–60%
