= Frank Nicastro =

American politician

Member of the Connecticut House of Representatives from the 79th district
- In office 2007–2017
- Preceded by: Kosta Diamantis
- Succeeded by: Chris Ziogas

Mayor of Bristol, Connecticut
- In office 1993–2003

Personal details
- Born: November 23, 1940 (age 85) Bristol, Connecticut, U.S.
- Party: Democratic
- Children: 3

Frank Nicastro Sr. is a retired American politician from Bristol, Connecticut. Nicastro, a Democrat, served as a member of the Connecticut House of Representatives for ten years. He previously served for a decade as mayor of Bristol, Connecticut, and before that, for ten years as a city councilor.

Nicastro is also a jazz trumpet player.
