= Fred Gee (politician) =

American politician (born 1973)

Member of the Connecticut House of Representatives from the 126th district
- Incumbent
- Assumed office January 4, 2023
- Preceded by: Charlie Stallworth

Personal details
- Born: November 1, 1973 (age 52) Bridgeport, Connecticut, United States
- Party: Democrat
- Education: Concordia College; Shaw University School of Divinity

Fred Gee Jr. (born 1973) is an American politician. He is a Democratic member of the Connecticut House of Representatives serving in the 126th district since 2022.
