= Marcus Brown (politician) =

American politician (born 1991)

Member of the Connecticut House of Representatives from the 127th district
- Incumbent
- Assumed office January 8, 2022
- Preceded by: Jack Hennessy

Personal details
- Born: April 22, 1991 (age 35) Bridgeport, Connecticut, U.S.
- Party: Democratic
- Education: Housatonic Community College; Southern New Hampshire University (BS)
- Occupation: Non-profit worker
- Committees: Vice Chair, Transportation; Member, Appropriations; Member, Judiciary
- Website: www.housedems.ct.gov/BrownM/

Marcus Brown (born April 22, 1991) is an American politician serving as a member of the Connecticut House of Representatives and as Assistant Majority Leader. A member of the Democratic Party, Brown represents the 127th district, which includes the North End and parts of the Brooklawn neighborhood in Bridgeport.

== Early life and education ==
Brown was born on April 22, 1991, in Bridgeport, Connecticut. He attended Bridgeport Public Schools. Brown later studied at Housatonic Community College for two years before transferring to Southern New Hampshire University, where he earned a Bachelor of Science degree in Business Administration.

== Career ==
Before entering politics, Brown worked in the non-profit sector, focusing on assisting young people with job training and placement.

=== Connecticut House of Representatives ===
==== Elections ====
Brown was first elected to the Connecticut House of Representatives in November 2022, succeeding Jack Hennessey. He was sworn into office in January 2023. Brown ran for reelection in 2024 unopposed and was sworn in for his second term on January 8, 2025.

==== Tenure ====
Brown currently serves as the Vice Chair of the Transportation Committee and is a member of both the Appropriations Committee and the Judiciary Committee. He also serves as Assistant Majority Leader in the Connecticut House of Representatives.

During his tenure, Brown has supported legislation to eliminate the state car tax and establish a Child Tax Credit. He has also worked to secure millions of dollars in funding for Bridgeport to rebuild local schools.

== See also ==
- Connecticut House of Representatives
- Connecticut Democratic Party
