= 2022 Connecticut Question 1 =

Question 1
- Shall the Constitution of the State be amended to permit the General Assembly to provide for early voting?

Results
Choice	Votes	%
Yes	687,385	60.53%
No	448,295	39.47%
Total votes	1,135,680	100.00%
Municipality results
Yes
50–60%
60–70%
70–80%
80–90%
No
50–60%
60–70%

Question 1 was a constitutional amendment proposition in Connecticut to authorize the state legislature to create a period of early voting for elections in the state of Connecticut. The amendment passed with 60.5% of the vote.

== Background ==
In 2014, Connecticut voters rejected a proposed amendment to the State Constitution which would have allowed early voting in the state and removed restrictions on absentee voting. The measure failed by a margin of 52% to 48%.

The 2022 amendment was introduced during the 2021 legislative session as House Joint Resolution 59 (HJR 59). HJR 59 passed the House by a vote 115–26 with 10 absent or not voting. It passed the Senate by a vote of 26–9 with one absent. All Democratic legislators either voted in favor or did not vote. Republican legislators were divided, with a majority voting against it.

The 2022 amendment authorized in-person early voting; however, unlike the 2014 amendment, it did not expand absentee voting.

== Results ==
Question 1
Choice	Votes	%
For	687,385	60.53
Against	448,295	39.47
Total	1,135,680	100.00
