= Terrie Wood =

American politician (born 1953)

Member of the Connecticut House of Representatives from the 141st district
- In office January 3, 2009 – January 4, 2023
- Preceded by: Alex Knopp
- Succeeded by: Tracy Marra

Personal details
- Born: Terrie Eaton Egert; January 14, 1953 (age 73) Lakewood, Ohio, U.S.
- Party: Republican
- Spouse(s): John Frederick Wood, Jr. (m. 1975)
- Children: 3
- Education: Rollins College (BA)
- Website: Official website

Terrie Eaton Wood (née Egert; born January 14, 1953) is an American politician who served as a member of the Connecticut House of Representatives, representing Darien and Rowayton, Connecticut in the 141st district. She had run unopposed in her first two elections, but faced Democrat Rob Werner for her third.

== Life ==
Wood was born Terrie Eaton Egert January 14, 1953 in Lakewood, Ohio, to Howard Egert, Jr., an attorney, and Janet Jackson Egert (née Jackson; 1925-2018).

Wood is a graduate of Rollins College. She had previously been a member of the Darien Town Meeting and president of the Darien Land Trust. She is the co-founder of The Darien Environmental Group. Wood is a Republican.

== Personal life ==
On July 12, 1975, Egert married John Frederick Wood, Jr., at Rocky River Methodist Church in Rocky River, Ohio. His father was an attorney with the United States Fidelity and Guarantee Company in New York. He would later form The Wood Group at Morgan Stanley in Stamford. They have three children and reside in Darien, Connecticut.
