= Connecticut's 141st House of Representatives district =

American legislative district

Connecticut's 141st State House of Representatives district
Representative
Tracy Marra; R–Darien

Connecticut's 141st House of Representatives district elects one member of the Connecticut House of Representatives. The district contains Rowayton and part of Darien. Its current representative is Tracy Marra.

== List of representatives ==
Representative	Party	Years	District home	Note
Stewart McKinney	Republican	1967–1971	Fairfield	Elected to U.S. Congress
Harry W. Wenz	Republican	1971–1973	Fairfield	Redistricted to the 134th District
Gennaro Frate	Republican	1973–1975	Darien	Redistricted from the 150th District
Ralph E. Van Norstrand	Republican	1975–1989	Darien	Chose not to run for re-election
Reginald L. Jones, Jr.	Republican	1989–1995	Darien	Chose not to run for re-election
John J. Ryan	Republican	1995–2009	Darien	
Terrie Wood	Republican	2009–2023	Darien	
Tracy Marra	Republican	2023–incumbent	Darien	

== Recent Election Results ==
=== 2022 ===
2022 Connecticut State House of Representatives election, 141st District
Party	Candidate	Votes	%
Republican	Tracy Marra	5,825	86.84
Independent Party	Tracy Marra	883	13.16
Total votes		6,708	100.0

=== 2020 ===
2020 Connecticut State House of Representatives election, District 141
Party	Candidate	Votes	%
Republican	Terrie Wood (incumbent)	8,793	80.19
Independent Party	Terrie Wood (incumbent)	2,172	19.81
Total votes		10,965	100.00
Republican hold			
