= Christie Carpino =

American politician from Connecticut

Member of the Connecticut House of Representatives from the 32nd district
- Incumbent
- Assumed office January 5, 2011
- Preceded by: Jim O'Rourke

Personal details
- Born: Long Island, New York, U.S.
- Party: Republican
- Education: Northeastern University (JD); University of New Hampshire (BA)

Christie Carpino is a member of the Connecticut House of Representatives representing the 32nd district.

== Career ==
=== Connecticut House of Representatives ===
Carpino was first elected to the House of Representatives in 2010. She is a Republican.

=== Committees ===
- Government Administration and Elections Committee
- Public Health Committee
- Regulation Review Committee

== Personal ==
She graduated from the University of New Hampshire and Northeastern University. She is married with two children and one stepchild.
