= Kosta Diamantis =

American politician and fugitive (born 1956)

Member of the Connecticut House of Representatives from the 79th district
- In office January 6, 1993 – January 3, 2007
- Preceded by: Craig Taylor
- Succeeded by: Frank Nicastro

Personal details
- Born: June 21, 1956 (age 70) Bristol, Connecticut, U.S.
- Party: Democratic

Konstantinos "Kosta" Diamantis (born June 21, 1956) is an American politician who served in the Connecticut House of Representatives from the 79th district from 1993 to 2007.

In August 2006, he was defeated in the 79th district Democratic primary by Frank Nicastro.

In September 2026, following his conviction on bribery and extortion charges, Diamantis fled the United States before his sentencing and is living in Greece as a fugitive.
