= Tracy Marra =

American politician

Member of the Connecticut House of Representatives from the 141st district
- Incumbent
- Assumed office January 3, 2023
- Preceded by: Terrie Wood

Personal details
- Born: Tracy Hunt; October 16, 1974 (age 51) Lexington, Kentucky, U.S.
- Party: Republican
- Spouse: David E. Marra
- Children: 3
- Education: Lafayette High School
- Alma mater: University of Kentucky; Butler University (PharmD)
- Occupation: Pharmacist, politician
- Website: House website Official website

Tracy Hunt Marra (/ˈmɑːrə/ MAR-ə; née Hunt; born October 16, 1974) is an American politician who currently serves as a member of the Connecticut House of Representatives representing Darien and Rowayton in the 141st assembly district since 2023 succeeding Terrie Wood.
