= Kevin Brown (politician) =

American politician

Member of the Connecticut House of Representatives from the 56th district
- Incumbent
- Assumed office January 4, 2023
- Preceded by: Mike Winkler

Personal details
- Born: 1982 (age 43–44) Norwich, Connecticut, U.S.
- Party: Democratic
- Education: Eastern Connecticut State University (BA)
- Occupation: High school civics teacher

Kevin Brown (born 1982) is an American Democratic Party politician serving as a member of the Connecticut House of Representatives from the 56th district, which encompasses part of the town of Vernon, since 2023. He was first elected in 2022, defeating Republican candidate Jim Tedford, and was re-elected in 2024.

== Early life and education ==
Brown was born and raised in Norwich, Connecticut, and graduated from Eastern Connecticut State University.

== Career ==
Brown has taught high school civics for more than 18 years and has coached youth sports.

== Political career ==
=== Vernon Board of Education ===
Before entering the legislature, Brown served on the Vernon Board of Education for about five years, where his committee work included the finance, curriculum, and policy committees.

=== Connecticut House of Representatives ===
Brown announced his candidacy for the 56th district seat, then held by Mike Winkler, who was not seeking re-election. In the November 2022 general election, he defeated Republican Jim Tedford, a member of the Vernon Town Council, receiving 4,099 votes to Tedford's 3,139. He took office on January 4, 2023. Brown was re-elected in November 2024, defeating Republican Brian Motola, 6,264 votes to 4,096.

Brown serves as an assistant majority leader.

==== Committee assignments ====
As of 2026, Brown serves on the following committees:

- Education Committee (vice chair)
- Housing Committee
- Committee for Legislative Staff Internships

== Electoral history ==
2022 Connecticut House of Representatives election, District 56
Party	Candidate	Votes	%
Democratic	Kevin Brown	4,099	56.6
Republican	Jim Tedford	3,139	43.4
Total votes		7,238	100

2024 Connecticut House of Representatives election, District 56
Party	Candidate	Votes	%
Democratic	Kevin Brown (incumbent)	6,264	60.5
Republican	Brian Motola	4,096	39.5
Total votes		10,360	100

== Personal life ==
Brown lives in Vernon with his wife and their two children.
