= Connecticut's 22nd House of Representatives district =

American legislative district

Connecticut's 22nd State House of Representatives district
Representative
Rebecca Martinez; D

Connecticut's 22nd House of Representatives district elects one member of the Connecticut House of Representatives. It consists of the town of Plainville and part of New Britain. It has been represented by Democrat Rebecca Martinez since 2025.

== List of representatives ==
List of Representatives from Connecticut's 22nd House District
Representative	Party	Years	District home	Note
Francis J. McCarthy	Republican	1967–1971	Wethersfield	Seat created
Thomas M. Kablik	Republican	1971–1975	Wethersfield	
Donald St. Pierre	Democratic	1975–1977	Plainville	
Joseph Pugliese	Republican	1977–1979	Plainville	
Pauline R. Kezer	Republican	1979–1987	Plainville	
Eugene Millerick	Democratic	1987–1995	Plainville	
Betty Boukus	Democratic	1995–2016	Plainville	Died in office after 2016 election
William Petit	Republican	2017–2023	Plainville	
Francis Cooley	Republican	2023–2025	Plainville	
Rebecca Martinez	Democratic	2025–	Plainville	

== Recent elections ==
=== 2022 ===
2022 Connecticut State House of Representatives election, District 22
Party	Candidate	Votes	%
Republican	Francis Cooley	5,046	50.26%
Democratic	Rebecca Martinez	4,705	46.87%
Independent Party	Rebecca Martinez	161	1.60%
Working Families	Rebecca Martinez	127	1.27%
Total votes		10,039	100.00%
Republican hold			

=== 2020 ===
2020 Connecticut State House of Representatives election, District 22
Party	Candidate	Votes	%
Republican	William Petit (incumbent)	7,005	79.63
Independent Party	William Petit (incumbent)	1,792	20.37
Total votes		8,797	100.00
Republican hold			

=== 2018 ===
2018 Connecticut State House of Representatives election, District 22
Party	Candidate	Votes	%
Republican	William Petit (incumbent)	5,738	65.7
Democratic	Richard Ireland	2,989	34.3
Total votes		8,727	100.00
Republican hold			

=== 2016 ===
2016 Connecticut State House of Representatives election, District 22
Party	Candidate	Votes	%
Republican	William Petit	6,357	60.06
Democratic	Betty Boukus (Incumbent)	4,229	39.94
Total votes		10,588	100.00
Republican gain from Democratic			

=== 2014 ===
2014 Connecticut State House of Representatives election, District 22
Party	Candidate	Votes	%
Democratic	Betty Boukus (Incumbent)	3,878	55.1
Republican	Kathern Pugliese	2,610	37.1
Independent Party	Kathern Pugliese	314	4.5
Independent Party	Richard William Broderick II	237	3.4
Total votes		7,039	100.00
Democratic hold			

=== 2012 ===
2012 Connecticut State House of Representatives election, District 22
Party	Candidate	Votes	%
Republican	Scott Saunders	2,767	31.4
Democratic	Betty Boukus (Incumbent)	6,039	68.6
Total votes		8,806	100.00
Democratic hold			
