= Jack Hennessy (politician) =

American politician (1951–2024)

John F. Hennessy

Member of the Connecticut House of Representatives from the 127th district
- In office January 5, 2005 – January 4, 2023
- Preceded by: Jacqueline Cocco
- Succeeded by: Marcus Brown

Personal details
- Born: July 5, 1951 Norwalk, Connecticut, U.S.
- Died: December 8, 2024 (aged 73)
- Party: Democratic

John F. Hennessy (July 5, 1951 – December 8, 2024) was an American Democratic Party politician who served as a member of the Connecticut House of Representatives from the 127th district, which encompasses part of Bridgeport. He served from 2005 to 2023.

== Early life, education and military service ==
Hennessy was born in Norwalk, Connecticut, on July 5, 1951. He graduated from St. John's Preparatory School in Danvers, Massachusetts. He graduated from Boston College with a bachelor of arts in English literature in 1974. He was in the United States Army from 1974 to 1977, where he served in the 1st Ranger Battalion and attained the rank of Sergeant.

== Career ==
Hennessy retired from FedEx after 32 years. He was a driver by profession.

=== Political career ===
Hennessy was first elected in 2004, making him the longest-serving state lawmaker from Bridgeport. Hennessy was most recently elected in 2020, taking 66.4% of the vote over Republican Peter Perillo. Hennessy served as a member of the house Planning and Development Committee, Environment Committee, and Finance, Revenue, and Bonding Committee.

In 2022, Hennessy faced Bridgeport councilman Marcus Brown in the Democratic primary election for the seat. During the August 9 election, Brown defeated Hennessy by two votes– 573 to 571. However, Hennessy alleged absentee ballot fraud regarding signatures on applications to receive an absentee ballot. A judge found that four applications were not legitimate and ordered a new primary to be held on October 19, less than a month before the general election. Brown again defeated Hennessy in the election, this time 635–499. Hennessy was on the November 8 general election ballot as the nominee of the Working Families Party, alongside Brown, the Democratic nominee, and Republican Anthony Puccio. Hennessy came in third place behind Brown and Puccio, receiving 312 votes compared to Brown's 2,321 and Puccio's 1017.

== Death ==
Hennessy died on December 8, 2024, at the age of 73.
