= Connecticut's 56th House of Representatives district =

American legislative district

Connecticut's 56th State House of Representatives district
Representative
Kevin Brown; D

Connecticut's 56th House of Representatives district elects one member of the Connecticut House of Representatives. It encompasses parts of the town of Vernon and has been represented by Democrat Kevin Brown since 2023.

== List of representatives ==
List of Representatives from Connecticut's 56th State House District
Representative	Party	Years	District home	Note
Francis J. McMerriman	Democratic	1967–1971	Killingly	Seat created
Morton J. Blumenthal	Republican	1971–1973	Danielson	
Thomas H. Dooley	Democratic	1973–1975	Vernon	
Martin B. Burke	Democratic	1975–1977	Vernon	
Chet Morgan	Democratic	1977–1983	Vernon	
Robert B. Hurd	Republican	1983–1987	Vernon	
Joe Courtney	Democratic	1987–1995	Vernon	
Thomasina Clemons	Democratic	1995–2001	Vernon	
Claire Janowski	Democratic	2001–2017	Vernon	
Mike Winkler	Democratic	2017–2023	Vernon	
Kevin Brown	Democratic	2023–	Vernon	

== Recent elections ==
=== 2020 ===
2020 Connecticut State House of Representatives election, District 56
Party	Candidate	Votes	%
Democratic	Michael Winkler (incumbent)	6,594	55.19
Republican	Laura B. Bush	4,782	40.03
Working Families	Michael Winkler (incumbent)	287	2.40
Independent Party	Laura B. Bush	284	2.38
Total votes		11,947	100.00
Democratic hold			

=== 2018 ===
2018 Connecticut House of Representatives election, District 56
Party	Candidate	Votes	%
Democratic	Mike Winkler (Incumbent)	5,150	57.5
Republican	Laaura Bush	3,806	42.5
Total votes		8,956	100.00
Democratic hold			

=== 2016 ===
2016 Connecticut House of Representatives election, District 56
Party	Candidate	Votes	%
Democratic	Mike Winkler	5,456	51.73
Republican	Jim Tedford	5,091	48.27
Total votes		10,547	100.00
Democratic hold			

=== 2014 ===
2014 Connecticut House of Representatives election, District 56
Party	Candidate	Votes	%
Democratic	Claire Janowski (Incumbent)	3,730	54.9
Republican	Jim Tedford	2,815	41.5
Independent Party	Jim Tedford	244	3.6
Total votes		6,789	100.00
Democratic hold			

=== 2012 ===
2012 Connecticut House of Representatives election, District 56
Party	Candidate	Votes	%
Democratic	Claire Janowski (Incumbent)	7,225	100.0
Total votes		7,225	100.00
Democratic hold			
