= Mike Winkler =

American politician

Member of the Connecticut House of Representatives from the 56th district
- In office January 4, 2017 – January 4, 2023
- Preceded by: Claire Janowski
- Succeeded by: Kevin Brown

Personal details
- Born: Pittsburgh, Pennsylvania, U.S.
- Party: Democratic
- Education: University of Connecticut (BA, MA)

Mike Winkler is an American politician who served as a member of the Connecticut House of Representatives from the 56th district, which includes part of the town of Vernon, from 2017 to 2023.

== Career ==
In 2016, Winkler was elected to the seat in a close election over Republican Jim Tedford. Winkler was re-elected in 2018 and 2020 over Republican Laura Bush by a 15-point margin both times. In March 2021, Winkler controversially claimed that "you count Asians and other minorities that have never been discriminated against" when responding to a claim made by Sam Romeo, chairman of the Greenwich, Connecticut Housing Authority, that the population of the town of Greenwich was 37% racial minorities. Winkler later apologized after receiving criticism from Asian-American Connecticut politicians such as William Tong and Tony Hwang.
