= Connecticut's 48th House of Representatives district =

American legislative district

Connecticut's 48th State House of Representatives district
Representative
Mark DeCaprio; R

Connecticut's 48th House of Representatives district elects one member of the Connecticut House of Representatives. It encompasses parts of the towns of Colchester, Windham, Lebanon, and Mansfield. It has been represented by Republican Mark DeCaprio since 2022.

== List of representatives ==
List of Representatives from Connecticut's 48th State House District
Representative	Party	Years	District home	Note
Robert D. King	Republican	1967–1973	Tolland	Seat created
James H. Brannen III	Republican	1973–1975	Colchester	
Sam Gejdenson	Democratic	1975–1979	Fitchville	
Martin M. Masters	Democratic	1979–1981	Lebanon	
Joe Broder	Republican	1981–1983	Colchester	
Kenneth Przybysz	Democratic	1983–1987	Uncasville	
Andrew McCall Norton	Republican	1987–1997	Westchester	
Linda Orange	Democratic	1997–2021	Colchester	
Brian Smith	Democratic	2021–2023	Colchester	
Mark DeCaprio	Republican	2023–	Lebanon	

== Recent elections ==
=== 2020 ===
2020 Connecticut State House of Representatives election, District 48
Party	Candidate	Votes	%
Democratic	Brian Smith (incumbent)	6,920	50.71
Republican	Julie Shilosky	6,038	44.24
Working Families	Brian Smith (incumbent)	358	2.62
Independent Party	Julie Shilosky	331	2.43
Total votes		13,647	100.00
Democratic hold			

=== 2018 ===
2018 Connecticut House of Representatives election, District 48
Party	Candidate	Votes	%
Democratic	Linda Orange (Incumbent)	6,029	55.1
Republican	Mark DeCaprio	4,915	44.9
Total votes		10,944	100.00
Democratic hold			

=== 2016 ===
2016 Connecticut House of Representatives election, District 48
Party	Candidate	Votes	%
Democratic	Linda Orange (Incumbent)	6,702	55.96
Republican	Evan Evans	5,275	44.04
Total votes		11,977	100.00
Democratic hold			

=== 2014 ===
2014 Connecticut House of Representatives election, District 48
Party	Candidate	Votes	%
Democratic	Linda Orange (Incumbent)	4,688	53.4
Republican	Evan Evans	3,544	40.4
Working Families	Linda Orange (Incumbent)	547	6.2
Total votes		8,779	100.00
Democratic hold			

=== 2012 ===
2012 Connecticut House of Representatives election, District 48
Party	Candidate	Votes	%
Democratic	Linda Orange (Incumbent)	6,607	60.6
Republican	Stan Soby	4,292	39.4
Total votes		10,899	100.00
Democratic hold			
