= Connecticut's 46th House of Representatives district =

American legislative district

Connecticut's 46th State House of Representatives district
Representative
Derell Wilson; D

Connecticut's 46th House of Representatives district elects one member of the Connecticut House of Representatives. It encompasses parts of Norwich and has been represented by Democrat Derell Wilson since 2023.

== List of representatives ==
List of Representatives from Connecticut's 46th State House District
Representative	Party	Years	District home	Note
Edwin A. Lassman	Democratic	1967–1969	South Windsor	Seat created
Thomas J. Donnelly	Republican	1969–1973	South Windsor	
Thomas Francis Sweeney	Democratic	1973–1985	Norwich	
Peter Nystrom	Republican	1985–2003	Norwich	
Melissa Olson	Democratic	2003–2013	Norwich	
Emmett Riley	Democratic	2013–2023	Norwich	
Derell Wilson	Democratic	2023–	Norwich	

== Recent elections ==
=== 2020 ===
2020 Connecticut State House of Representatives election, District 46
Party	Candidate	Votes	%
Democratic	Emmett Riley (incumbent)	4,625	58.66
Republican	Robert Bell	2,711	34.38
Working Families	Emmett Riley (incumbent)	293	3.72
Independent Party	Robert Bell	256	3.25
Total votes		7,885	100.00
Democratic hold			

=== 2018 ===
2018 Connecticut House of Representatives election, District 46
Party	Candidate	Votes	%
Democratic	Emmett Riley (Incumbent)	3,621	64.5
Republican	Andrew Lockwood	1,990	35.5
Total votes		5,611	100.00
Democratic hold			

=== 2016 ===
2016 Connecticut House of Representatives election, District 46
Party	Candidate	Votes	%
Democratic	Emmett Riley (Incumbent)	3,536	51.88
Republican	Andrew Lockwood	2,670	39.17
Independent Party	Bonnie Hong	610	8.95
Total votes		6,816	100.00
Democratic hold			

=== 2014 ===
2014 Connecticut House of Representatives election, District 46
Party	Candidate	Votes	%
Democratic	Emmett Riley (Incumbent)	2,461	59.8
Republican	Rob Dempsky	1,403	34.1
Independent Party	Rob Dempsky	254	6.2
Total votes		4,118	100.00
Democratic hold			

=== 2012 ===
2012 Connecticut House of Representatives election, District 46
Party	Candidate	Votes	%
Democratic	Emmett Riley	4,276	71.8
Republican	Mikel E. Middleton	1,683	28.2
Total votes		5,959	100.00
Democratic hold			
