= Charlie Stallworth =

American politician (born 1964)

Member of the Connecticut House of Representatives from the 126th district
- In office February 28, 2011 – 2022
- Preceded by: Christopher Caruso
- Succeeded by: Fred Gee

Personal details
- Born: August 5, 1964 (age 62) Monroeville, Alabama, U.S.
- Party: Democratic
- Education: Selma University (B.A); Vanderbilt University (Master of Divinity); Yale Divinity School (Master of Sacred Theology); United Theological Seminary (Doctor of Ministry)

Charlie Stallworth (born August 5, 1964) is an American politician who served in the Connecticut House of Representatives from the 126th district from 2011 to 2022.
