= Mark DeCaprio =

American politician

Member of the Connecticut House of Representatives from the 48th district
- Incumbent
- Assumed office January 4, 2023
- Preceded by: Brian Smith
- Succeeded by: Bob Fernandez (elect)

Personal details
- Born: 1957 (age 68–69)
- Party: Republican
- Education: Eastern Connecticut State University (BS); University of Connecticut (MA)

Mark DeCaprio (born 1957) is a Republican member of the Connecticut House of Representatives serving in the 48th district. He is a navy submarine veteran.
