= Laura Dancho =

American politician

Member of the Connecticut House of Representatives from the 120th district
- In office January 4, 2023 – January 8, 2025
- Preceded by: Phil Young
- Succeeded by: Kaitlyn Shake

Personal details
- Party: Republican

Laura Dancho is an American politician, who is a former Republican member of the Connecticut House of Representatives from District 120 from 2023 to 2025. She was formerly a member of Stratford Town Council.

In the 2024 Connecticut House of Representatives election, she was unseated by Democrat Kaitlyn Shake.
