= Francis Cooley =

American politician (born 1963)

Member of the Connecticut House of Representatives from the 22nd district
- In office January 4, 2023 – January 8, 2025
- Preceded by: William Petit
- Succeeded by: Rebecca Martinez

Personal details
- Born: Francis Rexford Cooley; October 16, 1963 (age 63) Hartford, Connecticut, U.S.
- Party: Republican
- Education: University of Colorado (BA); University of Maine (MA); University of Hartford (M. Ed.)

Francis Rexford Cooley (born October 16, 1963) is an American politician formerly serving as a member of the Connecticut House of Representatives from the 22nd district, which encompasses Plainville as well as parts of Farmington and Southington, from 2023 to 2025.

== Early life and education ==
Cooley was born October 16, 1963, in Hartford, Connecticut. He studied history at the University of Colorado (BA) and the University of Maine (MA). Cooley also completed a Master of Education (M. Ed.) at the University of Hartford in 2004.

== Career ==
Cooley worked as an educator at the Paier College of Art.

== Politics ==
A member of the Republican Party, Cooley was first elected in 2022 after narrowly defeating Democrat Rebecca Martinez by 53 votes.
