= Brian Smith (Connecticut politician) =

American politician

Brian T. Smith is an American Democratic Party politician who served as a member of the Connecticut House of Representatives from the 48th district, which includes part of the towns of Colchester, Lebanon, Mansfield, and Windham since 2020. Smith was first elected in January 2020 in a special election over Republican Mark DeCaprio. Smith was re-elected later that year over Republican Julie Shilosky. Smith served as a member of the Higher Education and Employment, Planning and Development, and Transportation Committees.

In the 2022 Connecticut House of Representatives election he stood down from office and was succeeded by Republican Mark DeCaprio.
