= Derell Wilson =

American politician

Member of the Connecticut House of Representatives from the 46th district
- Incumbent
- Assumed office January 4, 2023
- Preceded by: Emmett Riley

Personal details
- Born: January 5, 1992 (age 34) Norwich, Connecticut, U.S.
- Party: Democratic
- Education: American International College

Derell Wilson (born January 5, 1992) is an American politician serving as a member of the Connecticut House of Representatives for the 46th district. Elected in November 2022, he assumed office on January 4, 2023.

== Early life and education ==
Wilson was born and raised in Norwich, Connecticut. Wilson is one of nine siblings and had a twin brother, Terell Wilson, who died in 2016. Wilson graduated from the Norwich Free Academy in 2010 and studied biochemistry at American International College.

== Career ==
From 2019 to 2022, Wilson served as a member of the Norwich City Council. He also worked as a paraprofessional educator at the Integrated Day Charter School. Wilson was elected to the Connecticut House of Representatives in November 2022. When he assumed office, he became the first Black person to represent Norwich in the House.
