= Emmett Riley =

American politician

Member of the Connecticut House of Representatives from the 46th district
- In office January 9, 2013 – January 4, 2023
- Preceded by: Melissa Olson Riley
- Succeeded by: Derell Wilson

Personal details
- Born: May 6, 1969 (age 57) Norwich, Connecticut, U.S.
- Party: Democratic

Emmett Riley (born May 6, 1969) is an American politician who served as a member of the Connecticut House of Representatives for the 46th district from 2013 to 2023.
