= Phil Young (politician) =

American politician

Phil Young is an American Democratic Party politician who served as a member of the Connecticut House of Representatives from the 120th district, which includes part of Stratford, from 2018 to 2022. Young was first elected in 2018 during a special election against Republican Bill Cabral. In that year's general election, Young defeated Republican Jim Feehan by just 13 votes. Young defeated Feehan again in 2020 by a 2.6 point margin. In February 2022, Young announced that he will seek re-election in the 2022 Connecticut House of Representatives election but was unseated by Republican Laura Dancho. Young served as a member of the house's Judiciary Committee, Public Health Committee, and the Environment Committee.
