= 2022 Connecticut Senate election =

2022 Connecticut State Senate election
- November 8, 2022

All 36 seats in the Connecticut Senate 19 seats needed for a majority
- Turnout: 57.62% ▼
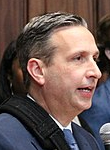

	Majority party	Minority party
Leader	Bob Duff	Kevin C. Kelly
Party	Democratic	Republican
Leader since	January 7, 2015	January 6, 2021
Leader's seat	District 11	District 21
Last election	24	12
Seats before	23	13
Seats won	24	12
Seat change	▲1	▼1
Popular vote	643,543	535,500
Percentage	52.96%	44.07%
Swing	▼1.86%	▲0.37%
- Results: Democratic gain Democratic hold Republican hold
President pro tempore of the Senate before election
Martin Looney
Democratic
Elected President pro tempore of the Senate
Martin Looney
Democratic

The 2022 Connecticut State Senate election was held on November 8, 2022, as part of the biennial 2022 United States elections. Connecticut voters elected senators in all of the 36 State Senate districts. State senators serve two-year terms in the Connecticut State Senate, with all 36 of the seats up for election each cycle. Primary elections were held in August 2022.

Democrats gained one seat, increasing their majority to 24 out of 36 seats, and winning back the supermajority they had lost in a resignation and special election in 2021.

== Retirements ==
Seven incumbents did not seek re-election in 2022.

=== Democrats ===
1. District 4: Steve Cassano retired.
2. District 13: Mary Abrams retired due to health concerns.
3. District 26: Will Haskell retired.

=== Republicans ===
1. District 8: Kevin Witkos retired.
2. District 20: Paul Formica retired.
3. District 30: Craig Miner retired.
4. District 35: Dan Champagne retired.

== Predictions ==
Source	Ranking	As of
Sabato's Crystal Ball	Likely D	May 19, 2022

== Results ==
↓
24	12
Democratic	Republican

Parties	Candidates	Seats				Popular vote		
Parties	Candidates	2020	2022	±	Strength	Vote	%	Change
Democratic	35	24	24	Steady	66.66%	643,543	52.96%	▼1.86%
Republican	32	12	12	Steady	33.33%	535,500	44.07%	▲0.37%
Independent Party	1 (Note: In addition, the Independent Party of Connecticut cross-endorsed 22 candidates, 11 Democrats and 11 Republicans.)	0	0	Steady	0.00%	16,058	1.32%	▼0.28%
Working Families	0 (Note: In addition, the Working Families Party of Connecticut cross-endorsed 19 candidates, all Democrats.)	0	0	Steady	0.00%	11,241	0.92%	▼0.07%
Green	3	0	0	Steady	0.00%	4,770	0.39%	▲0.33%
Libertarian	1	0	0	Steady	0.00%	3,880	0.32%	▲0.17%
Other parties and Write-ins	1	0	0	Steady	0.00%	191	0.02%	▼0.15%
Total	73	36	36	0	100.00%	1,215,183	100.00%	-

One seat flipped from Republican to Democratic, resulting in a Democratic majority of 24–12 in the Senate chamber. This made up for the Democratic loss in the 2021 special election in District 36, resulting in the same senate composition following the 2020 senate election.

A special election in District 36 was held on August 17, 2021, to fill the vacancy left by Democrat Alex Kasser, who resigned effective June 22, 2021. Kasser cited her ongoing divorce proceedings as the reason for her resignation. Republican candidate Ryan Fazio was elected after defeating Democratic candidate Alexis Gevanter and Independent candidate John Blankley, flipping the seat from Democratic to Republican, resulting in a Democratic majority of 23-13 prior to the 2022 senate election.

Seven incumbent senators, Steve Cassano (D-4th), Kevin Witkos (R-8th), Mary Daugherty Abrams (D-13th), Paul Formica (R-20th), Will Haskell (D-26th), Craig Miner (R-30th), Dan Champagne (R-35th), did not attempt to run for reelection. One incumbent, Dennis Bradley (D-23rd), was defeated in the primaries.

=== Composition ===
Affiliation	Party (Shading indicates majority caucus.)		Total	
Affiliation	Democratic	Republican	Total	Vacant
Before election	23	13	36	0
After election	24	12	36	0
Change	▲1	▼1		Steady

== Detailed results ==
=== District 1 ===
Democratic incumbent John Fonfara was reelected to a 14th term after defeating Republican candidate Alexander Colaiacovo, Green Party candidate Oladotum Michael Oretade, and petitioning candidate Alyssa Peterson. Fonfara had represented the 1st District since 1997.

2022 Connecticut State Senate election, District 1
Party	Candidate	Votes	%
Democratic	John Fonfara (incumbent)	11,579	68.19%
Republican	Alexander Colaiacovo	4,893	28.81%
Green	Oladotum Michael Oretade	318	1.87%
Petitioning	Alyssa Peterson	191	1.12%
Total votes		16,981	100.00%
Democratic hold			

=== District 2 ===
Democratic incumbent Douglas McCrory was reelected to a fourth term after running unopposed. McCrory had represented the 2nd District since 2017.

2022 Connecticut State Senate election, District 2
Party	Candidate	Votes	%
Democratic	Douglas McCrory (incumbent)	21,101	100.00%
Total votes		21,101	100.00%
Democratic hold			

=== District 3 ===
Democratic incumbent Saud Anwar was reelected to a third term after defeating Republican candidate Matt Harper. Anwar was also nominated by the Working Families Party. He had represented the 3rd District since 2019.

2022 Connecticut State Senate election, District 3
Party	Candidate	Votes	%
Democratic	Saud Anwar (incumbent)	18,399	59.05%
Republican	Matt Harper	12,189	39.12%
Working Families	Saud Anwar (incumbent)	569	1.83%
Total votes		16,981	100.00%
Democratic hold			

=== District 4 ===
Democratic candidate MD Rahman was elected after defeating Republican candidate Jacqueline Crespan. Rahman was also nominated by the Working Families Party. This seat was previously held by Democrat Steve Cassano since 2011.

2022 Connecticut State Senate election, District 4
Party	Candidate	Votes	%
Democratic	MD Rahman	22,804	58.16%
Republican	Jacqueline Crespan	15,565	39.70%
Working Families	MD Rahman	838	2.14%
Total votes		39,207	100.00%
Democratic hold			

=== District 5 ===
Democratic incumbent Derek Slap was reelected to a third term after running unopposed. Slap had represented the 5th District since 2019.

2022 Connecticut State Senate election, District 5
Party	Candidate	Votes	%
Democratic	Derek Slap (incumbent)	30,947	100.00%
Total votes		30,947	100.00%
Democratic hold			

=== District 6 ===
Democratic incumbent Rick Lopes was reelected to a second term after defeating Republican candidate Tremell Collins. Lopes was also nominated by the Working Families Party. Lopes had represented the 6th District since 2021.

2022 Connecticut State Senate election, District 6
Party	Candidate	Votes	%
Democratic	Rick Lopes (incumbent)	13,174	53.91%
Republican	Tremell J. Collins	10,666	43.65%
Working Families	Rick Lopes (incumbent)	597	2.44%
Total votes		24,437	100.00%
Democratic hold			

=== District 7 ===
Republican incumbent John Kissel was reelected to a 16th term after defeating Democratic candidate Cynthia Mangini. Kissel was also nominated by the Independent Party, while Mangini was also nominated by the Working Families Party. Kissel had represented the 7th District since 1993.

2022 Connecticut State Senate election, District 7
Party	Candidate	Votes	%
Republican	John Kissel (incumbent)	21,751	55.80%
Democratic	Cynthia Mangini	16,253	41.70%
Working Families	Cynthia Mangini	504	1.29%
Independent Party	John Kissel (incumbent)	472	1.21%
Total votes		38,980	100.00%
Republican hold			

=== District 8 ===
Republican candidate Lisa Seminara was elected after defeating Democratic candidate Paul Honig. Seminara was also nominated by the Independent Party. This seat was previously held by Republican Kevin Witkos since 2009.

2022 Connecticut State Senate election, District 8
Party	Candidate	Votes	%
Democratic	Paul Honig	22,830	49.86%
Republican	Lisa Seminara	22,317	48.74%
Independent Party	Lisa Seminara	637	1.39%
Total votes		45,784	100.00%
Republican hold			

=== District 9 ===
Democratic incumbent Matt Lesser was reelected to a third term after defeating Republican candidate Lisa Marotta. Lesser was nominated by both the Working Families Party and the Independent Party. He had represented the 9th District since 2019.

2022 Connecticut State Senate election, District 9
Party	Candidate	Votes	%
Democratic	Matt Lesser (incumbent)	19,593	52.94%
Republican	Lisa J. Marotta	16,440	44.42%
Working Families	Matt Lesser (incumbent)	632	1.71%
Independent Party	Matt Lesser (incumbent)	346	0.93%
Total votes		37,011	100.00%
Democratic hold			

=== District 10 ===
Democratic incumbent Gary Winfield was reelected to a fourth term after defeating Republican candidate John Carlson. Winfield was also nominated by the Working Families Party, while Carlson was nominated by the Independent Party. Winfield had represented the 10th District since 2017.

2022 Connecticut State Senate election, District 10
Party	Candidate	Votes	%
Democratic	Gary Winfield (incumbent)	12,864	79.26%
Republican	John Carlson	2,528	15.58%
Working Families	Gary Winfield (incumbent)	645	3.97%
Independent Party	John Carlson	193	1.19%
Total votes		16,230	100.00%
Democratic hold			

=== District 11 ===
Democratic incumbent and Senate President Pro Tempore Martin Looney was reelected to a 16th term after defeating Republican candidate Steve Orosco. Looney had represented the 11th District since 1993.

2022 Connecticut State Senate election, District 11
Party	Candidate	Votes	%
Democratic	Martin Looney (incumbent)	17,173	77.72%
Republican	Steve Orosco	4,923	22.28%
Total votes		22,906	100.00%
Democratic hold			

=== District 12 ===
Democratic incumbent Christine Cohen was reelected to a third term after defeating Republican candidate Paul Crisci. Cohen was also nominated by both the Independent Party and the Working Families Party. She had represented the 12th District since 2019.

2022 Connecticut State Senate election, District 12
Party	Candidate	Votes	%
Democratic	Christine Cohen (incumbent)	26,179	53.56%
Republican	Paul Crisci	21,562	44.11%
Independent Party	Christine Cohen (incumbent)	573	1.17%
Working Families	Christine Cohen (incumbent)	567	1.16%
Total votes		48,881	100.00%
Democratic hold			

=== District 13 ===
Democratic candidate Jan Hochadel was elected after defeating Republican candidate Joseph Vollano. Hochadel was also nominated by the Working Families Party, while Vollano was nominated by the Independent Party. This seat was previous held by Democrat Mary Abrams since 2019.

2022 Connecticut State Senate election, District 13
Party	Candidate	Votes	%
Democratic	Jan Hochadel	17,172	52.33%
Republican	Joseph Vollano	14,491	44.16%
Working Families	Jan Hochadel	699	2.13%
Independent Party	Joseph Vollano	453	1.38%
Total votes		32,815	100.00%
Democratic hold			

=== District 14 ===
Democratic incumbent James Maroney was reelected to a third term after defeating Republican candidate Kim-Marie Mullin. Maroney was also nominated by the Independent Party. Maroney had represented the 14th District since 2019.

2022 Connecticut State Senate election, District 14
Party	Candidate	Votes	%
Democratic	James Maroney (incumbent)	20,863	53.00%
Republican	Kim-Marie Mullin	17,721	45.02%
Independent Party	James Maroney (incumbent)	777	1.97%
Total votes		39,361	100.00%
Democratic hold			

=== District 15 ===
Democratic incumbent Joan Hartley was reelected to a 12th term after running unopposed. Hartley was also nominated by the Independent Party. She had represented the 15th District since 2001.

2022 Connecticut State Senate election, District 15
Party	Candidate	Votes	%
Democratic	Joan Hartley (incumbent)	12,260	88.04%
Independent Party	Joan Hartley (incumbent)	1,665	11.96%
Total votes		13,925	100.00%
Democratic hold			

=== District 16 ===
Republican incumbent Rob Sampson was reelected to a third term after defeating Democratic candidate Christopher Robertson. Sampson was also nominated by the Independent Party. Sampson had represented the 16th District since 2019.

2022 Connecticut State Senate election, District 16
Party	Candidate	Votes	%
Republican	Rob Sampson (incumbent)	23,853	57.35%
Democratic	Christopher R. Robertson	17,223	41.41%
Independent Party	Rob Sampson (incumbent)	516	1.24%
Total votes		41,592	100.00%
Republican hold			

=== District 17 ===
Democratic incumbent Jorge Cabrera was reelected to a second term after defeating Republican candidate Kathy Hoyt. Cabrera was also nominated by both the Independent Party and the Working Families Party. He had represented the 17th District since 2021.

2022 Connecticut State Senate election, District 17
Party	Candidate	Votes	%
Democratic	Jorge Cabrera (incumbent)	16,726	51.81%
Republican	Kathy Hoyt	14,615	45.27%
Independent Party	Jorge Cabrera (incumbent)	480	1.49%
Working Families	Jorge Cabrera (incumbent)	462	1.43%
Total votes		32,283	100.00%
Democratic hold			

=== District 18 ===
Republican incumbent Heather Somers was reelected to a fourth term after defeating Democratic candidate Farouk Rajab. Somers was also nominated by the Independent Party, while Rajab was nominated by the Working Families Party. Somers had represented the 18th District since 2017.

2022 Connecticut State Senate election, District 18
Party	Candidate	Votes	%
Republican	Heather Somers (incumbent)	20,152	54.22%
Democratic	Farouk Rajab	15,617	42.02%
Independent Party	Heather Somers (incumbent)	763	2.05%
Working Families	Farouk Rajab	632	1.70%
Total votes		37,164	100.00%
Republican hold			

=== District 19 ===
Democratic incumbent Cathy Osten was reelected to a sixth term after defeating Republican candidate Pietro Camardello. Osten was also nominated by both the Independent Party and the Working Families Party. She had represented the 19th District since 2013.

2022 Connecticut State Senate election, District 19
Party	Candidate	Votes	%
Democratic	Cathy Osten (incumbent)	18,447	52.51%
Republican	Pietro Camardella	15,458	44.00%
Independent Party	Cathy Osten (incumbent)	627	1.78%
Working Families	Cathy Osten (incumbent)	596	1.70%
Total votes		35,128	100.00%
Democratic hold			

=== District 20 ===
Democratic candidate Martha Marx was elected after defeating Republican candidate Jerry Labriola Jr. Marx was also nominated by the Working Families Party, while Labriola was nominated by the Independent Party. This seat was previously held by Republican Paul Formica since 2015.

2022 Connecticut State Senate election, District 20
Party	Candidate	Votes	%
Democratic	Martha Marx	19,103	50.65%
Republican	Jerry Labriola Jr.	17,496	46.39%
Working Families	Martha Marx	609	1.61%
Independent Party	Jerry Labriola Jr.	505	1.34%
Total votes		37,713	100.00%
Democratic gain from Republican			

=== District 21 ===
Republican incumbent and Senate Minority Leader Kevin C. Kelly was reelected to a seventh term after defeating Democratic candidate Christopher Green. Kelly had represented the 21st District since 2011.

2022 Connecticut State Senate election, District 21
Party	Candidate	Votes	%
Republican	Kevin C. Kelly (incumbent)	23,255	57.28%
Democratic	Christopher Green	16,804	41.39%
Working Families	Christopher Green	541	1.33%
Total votes		40,600	100.00%
Republican hold			

=== District 22 ===
Democratic incumbent Marilyn Moore was reelected to a fifth term after defeating Libertarian candidate Wilfredo Martinez. Moore had represented the 22nd District since 2015.

2022 Connecticut State Senate election, District 22
Party	Candidate	Votes	%
Democratic	Marilyn Moore (incumbent)	16,535	80.99%
Libertarian	Wilfredo Martinez	3,880	19.01%
Total votes		20,415	100.00%
Democratic hold			

=== District 23 ===
Democratic candidate Herron Gaston was elected after defeating Republican candidate Michael Garrett and Working Families Party candidate Juliemar Ortiz. This seat was previously held by Democrat Dennis Bradley since 2019. He faced felony charges for alleged campaign finance violations committed during his first run in 2018, and was defeated in the primary.

Democratic primary
Party	Candidate	Votes	%
Democratic	Herron Gaston	1,775	52.2%
Democratic	Dennis Bradley (incumbent)	1,628	47.8%
Total votes		3,403	100.0%

2022 Connecticut State Senate election, District 23
Party	Candidate	Votes	%
Democratic	Herron Gaston	8,194	76.22%
Republican	Michael Garrett	1,883	17.52%
Working Families	Juliemar Ortiz	673	6.26%
Total votes		10,750	100.00%
Democratic hold			

=== District 24 ===
Democratic incumbent Julie Kushner was reelected to a third term after defeating Republican candidate Michelle Coelho. Kushner was also nominated by the Working Families Party, while Michelle Coelho was nominated by the Independent Party. Kushner had represented the 24th District since 2019.

2022 Connecticut State Senate election, District 24
Party	Candidate	Votes	%
Democratic	Julie Kushner (incumbent)	14,654	50.83%
Republican	Michelle Coelho	13,329	46.23%
Working Families	Julie Kushner (incumbent)	462	1.60%
Independent Party	Michelle Coelho	387	1.34%
Total votes		28,832	100.00%
Democratic hold			

=== District 25 ===
Democratic incumbent and Senate Majority Leader Bob Duff was reelected to a tenth term after defeating Republican candidate Daniel Miressi and Independent candidate Lisa Brinton. Duff was also nominated by the Working Families Party. He had represented the 25th District since 2005.

2022 Connecticut State Senate election, District 25
Party	Candidate	Votes	%
Democratic	Bob Duff (incumbent)	18,936	58.82%
Republican	Daniel Miressi	11,101	34.48%
Independent Party	Lisa Brinton	1,604	4.98%
Working Families	Bob Duff (incumbent)	554	1.72%
Total votes		32,195	100.00%
Democratic hold			

=== District 26 ===
Democratic candidate Ceci Maher was elected after defeating Republican candidate Toni Boucher. Boucher was also nominated by the Independent Party. This seat was previous represented by Democrat Will Haskell since 2019.

2022 Connecticut State Senate election, District 26
Party	Candidate	Votes	%
Democratic	Ceci Maher	25,582	56.87%
Republican	Toni Boucher	18,645	41.45%
Independent Party	Toni Boucher	756	1.68%
Total votes		44,983	100.00%
Democratic hold			

=== District 27 ===
Democratic incumbent Patricia Billie Miller was reelected to a second term after defeating Republican candidate Michael Battinelli. Miller had represented the 27th District since 2021.

2022 Connecticut State Senate election, District 27
Party	Candidate	Votes	%
Democratic	Patricia Billie Miller (incumbent)	15,629	61.62%
Republican	Michael Battinelli	9,733	38.38%
Total votes		25,362	100.00%
Democratic hold			

=== District 28 ===
Republican incumbent Tony Hwang was reelected to a fifth term after defeating Democratic candidate Timothy Gavin. Gavin was also nominated by the Independent Party. Hwang had represented the 28th District since 2015.

2022 Connecticut State Senate election, District 28
Party	Candidate	Votes	%
Republican	Tony Hwang (incumbent)	23,349	50.69%
Democratic	Timothy Gavin	22,133	48.05%
Independent Party	Timothy Gavin	580	1.26%
Total votes		46,062	100.00%
Republican hold			

=== District 29 ===
Democratic incumbent Mae Flexer was reelected for a fifth term after defeating Republican candidate Susanne Witkowski and Green Party candidate Jean de Smet. Flexer was also nominated by both the Working Families Party and the Independent Party. She had represented the 29th district since 2015.

2022 Connecticut State Senate election, District 29
Party	Candidate	Votes	%
Democratic	Mae Flexer (incumbent)	14,036	47.65%
Republican	Susanne Witkowski	13,927	47.28%
Green	Jean M. de Smet	634	2.15%
Working Families	Mae Flexer (incumbent)	516	1.71%
Independent Party	Mae Flexer (incumbent)	341	1.16%
Total votes		29,454	100.00%
Democratic hold			

=== District 30 ===
Republican candidate Stephen Harding was elected after defeating Democratic candidate Eva Bermudez Zimmerman. Zimmerman was also nominated by both the Working Families Party and the Independent Party. This seat was previously held by Republican Craig Miner since 2015.

2022 Connecticut State Senate election, District 30
Party	Candidate	Votes	%
Republican	Stephen Harding	24,404	53.81%
Democratic	Eva Bermudez Zimmerman	19,878	43.83%
Working Families	Eva Bermudez Zimmerman	610	1.35%
Independent Party	Eva Bermudez Zimmerman	457	1.01%
Total votes		45,349	100.00%
Republican hold			

=== District 31 ===
Republican incumbent Henri Martin was reelected to a fifth term after defeating Democratic candidate Greg Hahn. Martin was also nominated by the Independent Party. He had represented the 31st District since 2015.

2022 Connecticut State Senate election, District 31
Party	Candidate	Votes	%
Republican	Henri Martin (incumbent)	21,479	58.93%
Democratic	Greg Hahn	14,399	39.50%
Independent Party	Henri Martin (incumbent)	571	1.57%
Total votes		36,449	100.00%
Republican hold			

=== District 32 ===
Republican incumbent Eric Berthel was reelected to a fourth term after defeating Democratic candidate Jeff Desmarais. Berthel had represented the 32nd District since 2017.

2022 Connecticut State Senate election, District 32
Party	Candidate	Votes	%
Republican	Eric Berthel (incumbent)	28,432	58.95%
Democratic	Jeff Desmarais	19,799	41.05%
Total votes		48,231	100.00%
Republican hold			

=== District 33 ===
Democratic incumbent Norm Needleman was reelected to a third term after defeating Republican candidate Brandon Goff. Needleman was also nominated by the Independent Party. He had represented the 33rd District since 2019.

2022 Connecticut's 33rd State Senate district election
- Precinct results Needleman 50-60% 60-70% Goff 50-60%

2022 Connecticut State Senate election, District 33
Party	Candidate	Votes	%
Democratic	Norman Needleman (incumbent)	25,898	52.82%
Republican	Brandon Goff	22,212	45.30%
Independent Party	Norman Needleman (incumbent)	918	1.87%
Total votes		49,028	100.00%
Democratic hold			

=== District 34 ===
Republican incumbent Paul Cicarella was reelected to a second term after defeating Green Party candidate David Bedell. Cicarella was also nominated by the Independent Party. He had represented the 34th District since 2021.

2022 Connecticut State Senate election, District 34
Party	Candidate	Votes	%
Republican	Paul Cicarella (incumbent)	24,737	81.23%
Green	David A. Bedell	3,818	12.54%
Independent Party	Paul Cicarella (incumbent)	1,897	6.23%
Total votes		30,452	100.00%
Republican hold			

=== District 35 ===
Republican candidate Jeff Gordon was elected after defeating Democratic candidate Lisa Thomas. Thomas was also nominated by the Independent Party and the Working Families Party. This seat was previous held by Republican Dan Champagne since 2019.

2022 Connecticut State Senate election, District 35
Party	Candidate	Votes	%
Republican	Jeff Gordon	20,927	50.57%
Democratic	Lisa Thomas	19,381	46.83%
Independent Party	Lisa Thomas	540	1.30%
Working Families	Lisa Thomas	535	1.29%
Total votes		41,383	100.00%
Republican hold			

=== District 36 ===
2022 Connecticut's 36th State Senate district election
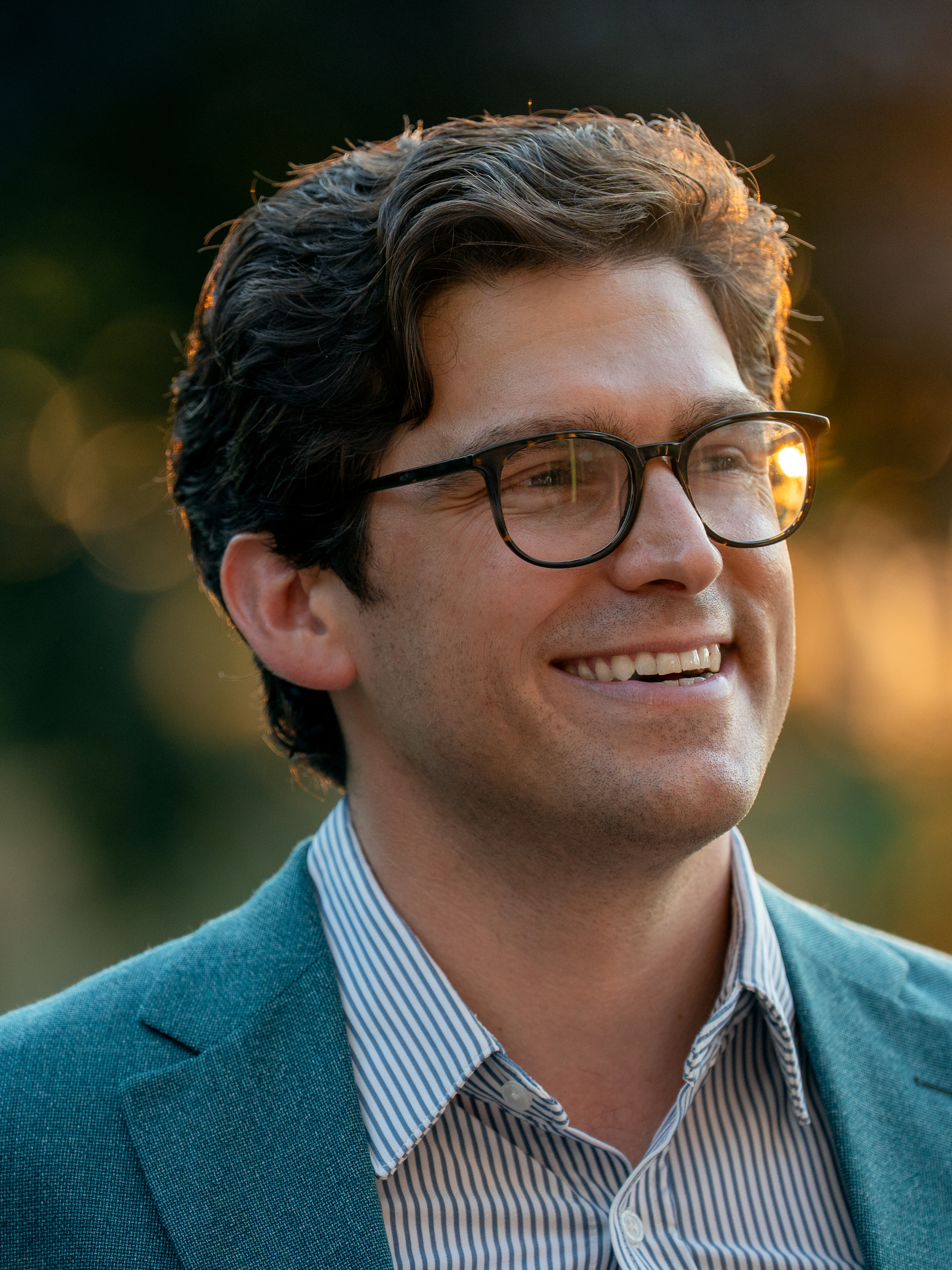

Candidate	Ryan Fazio	Trevor Crow
Party	Republican	Democratic
Popular vote	21,467	21,378
Percentage	50.10%	49.90%
- Precinct results Fazio 50–60% 60–70% Crow 50–60% 60–70%

Republican incumbent Ryan Fazio was reelected to a second term after defeating Democratic candidate Trevor Crow, a therapist. Fazio had represented the 36th District since 2021 when he won a special election to finish the term of Democrat Alex Kasser who resigned after her divorce litigation with her former husband Seth Bergstein impacted her ability to do the job.

2022 Connecticut State Senate election, District 36
Party	Candidate	Votes	%
Republican	Ryan Fazio (incumbent)	21,467	50.10%
Democratic	Trevor Crow	21,378	49.90%
Total votes		42,845	100.00%
Republican hold			

== See also ==
- 2022 United States House of Representatives elections in Connecticut
