= 2018 Connecticut Senate election =

- November 6, 2018

All 36 seats in the Connecticut State Senate 19 seats needed for a majority
- Turnout: 65.23% ▼
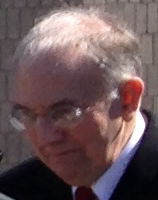

	Majority party	Minority party
Leader	Martin Looney	Len Fasano
Party	Democratic	Republican
Leader since	January 7, 2015	January 7, 2015
Leader's seat	11th	34th
Last election	18	18
Seats won	23	13
Seat change	▲5	▼5
Popular vote	725,644	593,346
Percentage	53.8%	43.4%
Swing	▲4.5%	▼2.9%
- Results: Democratic gain Democratic hold Republican hold
President pro tempore of the Senate before election
Martin Looney (Democratic)
Len Fasano (Republican)
Elected President pro tempore of the Senate
Martin Looney
Democratic

The 2018 Connecticut Senate election was held on November 6, 2018, concurrently with the elections for the Connecticut House of Representatives, to elect members to the Connecticut General Assembly. All 36 seats in the Connecticut Senate were up for election. The election resulted in Democrats expanding control in both chambers of the Connecticut General Assembly, ending the split control in the Senate, that had been in place since the 2016 elections. Primary elections were held on August 14, 2018.

== Background ==
=== 2016 general election ===
In the 2016 Connecticut State Senate election, Democrats lost their 21–15 majority as Republican achieved a net gain of three seats. The resulting 18–18 tie made procedural changes necessary. A power-sharing agreement was reached dividing control of the chamber, splitting the committees 50–50 and giving power to the Republicans to call procedural votes to bring legislation to the chamber floor, while Democratic Lt. Gov. Nancy Wyman retained the ability to break tied votes.

=== 2017 special elections ===
On January 4, 2017, shortly before the begin of 2017 legislative session, two State Senators resigned in order to pursue other offices. Democratic senator Eric Coleman and Republican senator Rob J. Kane resigned to pursue other state offices just minutes before the opening of the session in a deal of the parties which retained the partisan balance of the state senate.

Coleman was nominated by Governor Dannel Malloy for a judgeship on the Superior Court and was confirmed in May 2018 by the state senate in a 23–13 vote and the state house in a close 74–72 vote. Opponents of his nomination argued that because of the budget crisis the State could not afford the judges. Rob Kane was appointed as the Republican Auditor of Public Accounts, a post overseeing an agency that exist twice and is a patronage post of both parties in General Assembly. Kane was confirmed by the state house by a voice vote and the state senate by a 32–1 vote. He serves with Democrat John C. Geragosian. His predecessor Robert Ward had retired in December 2016.

On February 28, 2017, Democratic state representative Douglas McCrory was elected to Coleman's seat by a 72–25 margin against Republican nominee Michael McDonald while Republican state representative Eric Berthel was elected to Kane's seat by a 54–44 margin against Democratic nominee Greg Cava. Therefore, the special elections did not alter the partisan makeup of the Senate which remained tied 18–18.

=== 2017 budget conflict ===
On July 1, 2017, Connecticut entered its fiscal year without an enacted budget for the first time since 2009. A government shutdown was avoided by an executive order by Governor Dannel Malloy. The executive order imposed funding cuts to road repairs, school districts and non-profit organizations among other cuts. In June 2017, House and Senate Democrats had been unable to even agree on a provisional budget, while Republicans offered a budget that included savings due to changes to the collective bargaining of state employees. Among Democrats legislators, a liberal faction tried to avoid cuts to social security while a moderate faction tried to avoid tax increases.

At the beginning of July 2017, Connecticut budget deficit was estimated to be around $5.1 billion (equivalent to $6.7 billion in 2025). After negotiations with state employee union leaders, Governor Malloy announced an agreement that achieved a $1.57 billion (equivalent to $2.06 billion in 2025) saving while extending the contract's end date to 2027. On July 18, it was announced that the unions' members had approved the agreement by a margin of 83 percent to 17 percent. On July 24, the Connecticut House of Representatives approved the deal by a 78–72 vote, with all Republican Representatives and Democrat John Hampton opposed. On July 31, 2017, Lt. Gov. Nancy Wyman had to break a 18–18 tie in the Connecticut Senate in favor of the agreement. The approval of the Connecticut General Assembly made it possible for the agreement to take effect in the same fiscal year and not in the next.

On September 15, 2017, three Democratic senators, Paul Doyle, Joan Hartley and Gayle Slossberg, unexpectedly broke with their caucus and voted in favor of a Republican budget plan, that passed the Connecticut Senate by a 21–15 vote. At around 3 AM on September 16, 2017, the Connecticut House of Representative also passed the Republican proposal by a 77–73 with five Democratic Representatives, John Hampton, Pat Boyd, Lonnie Reed, Daniel S. Rovero and Kim Rose, defecting from their caucus. Governor Malloy vowed to veto the plan because of its cuts to higher education, which he did on September 28, 2017. On October 13, 2017, Standard & Poor's notified the state that it had changed the outlook on its general debt from "stable" to "negative".

On October 18, 2017, Democratic and Republican legislative leaders announced that they had come to an agreement on a two-year budget without input from Governor Malloy. The deal included no increases to the state's income and sales taxes, while increasing a tax for hospital providers from 6% to 8%, increasing the cigarette tax and adding a $10 surcharge for motor vehicle registrations and a $0.25 fee for Uber and Lyft rides. They also agreed upon a $40 million bailout for the city of Hartford, restoring the funding of municipalities and schools, while cutting $65 million in funding for the University of Connecticut and reducing available tax credits. In addition it put caps on spending and borrowing by the state and require the General Assembly to vote on all state employee union contracts, both Republican priorities.

On October 26, 2017, the Connecticut Senate passed the compromise budget by a vote of 33–3, while the Connecticut House of Representatives passed it by a 126–33 vote. On October 31, 2017, Governor Malloy signed most of the budget, while using his line-item veto to block the increase of the hospital provider fee. This hospital tax get reimbursed by federal government through Medicaid funding. According to the Governor, the wording of the budget had flaws which would cause the state to lose around $1 billion on the tax increase. On November 14, 2017, the Connecticut Senate passed a bill supported by Governor Malloy that clarified the wording of the hospital provider fee by a 34–0 vote. The bill also passed the Connecticut House of Representatives on November 15, 2017, by a 123–12 vote.

The budget crisis caused Connecticut to have no budget for 123 days, the longest period without a budget in state history.

=== Analysis ===
Connecticut can be considered a "blue state" that has supported the Democratic nominee for president in every election since 1992 and in which Democrats outnumber Republican by a ratio of 5 to 3 in voter registration. Nevertheless, the 2018 elections for governor and General Assembly were considered competitive as the budget woes and a struggling economy in the state made incumbent governor Dan Malloy very unpopular. Polls also showed that President Trump had a low approval rating in the State, which affect down-ballot elections.

Connecticut Democrats were able to capitalize more on the Anti-Trump sentiment than their Republican counterparts could with Anti-Malloy sentiment. In the Connecticut Senate, Democrats were able to win districts in traditionally Republican strongholds by among others flipping multiple legislative seats in Fairfield County. The senate district along Connecticut's Gold Coast (District 36) elected a Democrat for the first time in nearly 90 years.

In the 2018 elections, Democrats saw gains in state elections across the countries, gaining multiple Governorships and legislative chambers. Democrats also won control of the United States House of Representatives for the first time since 2010. Commentators called the election results a "blue wave", that was especially pronounced in state elections.

== Predictions ==
Source	Ranking	As of
Governing	Tossup	October 8, 2018

== Results ==
=== Overview ===
↓
23	13
Democratic	Republican

Source: Official results.

Parties	Candidates	Seats				Popular vote		
Parties	Candidates	2016	2018	+/-	Strength	Vote	%	Change
Democratic	36	18	23	▲5	63.89%	725,644	53.10%	▲4.52%
Republican	34	18	13	▼5	36.11%	593,346	43.42%	▼2.92%
Independent Party	1 (Note: In addition, the Independent Party of Connecticut cross-endorsed 26 candidates, 2 Democrats and 24 Republicans.)	0	0	Steady	0.00%	26,513	1.94%	▼0.74%
Working Families	0 (Note: In addition, the Working Families Party of Connecticut cross-endorsed 20 candidates, all Democrats.)	0	0	Steady	0.00%	19,966	1.46%	▼0.57%
Green	3	0	0	Steady	0.00%	1,077	0.08%	▼0.15%
Total	74	36	36	0	100.00%	1,366,546	100.00%	-

=== By district ===
==== District 1 ====
Incumbent Democratic state senator John Fonfara had represented the Connecticut's 1st State Senate District since 1997. He won reelection against Republican Barbara Ruhe and Green candidate Barbara Barry.

2018 Connecticut State Senate election, District 1
Party	Candidate	Votes	%
Democratic	John Fonfara (incumbent)	15,612	74.0
Republican	Barbara Ruhe	5,044	23.9
Green	Barbara Barry	447	2.1
Total votes		21,103	100.0
Democratic hold			

==== District 2 ====
Incumbent Democratic state senator Douglas McCrory had represented the Connecticut's 2nd State Senate District since 2017. He won reelection unopposed.

2018 Connecticut State Senate election, District 2
Party	Candidate	Votes	%
Democratic	Douglas McCrory (incumbent)	26,542	100.0
Total votes		26,542	100.0
Democratic hold			

==== District 3 ====
Incumbent Democratic state senator Timothy Larson had represented the Connecticut's 3rd State Senate District since 2015. He won reelection against Republican Jennifer L. Lovett, who was also the nominee of the Independent Party of Connecticut.

2018 Connecticut State Senate election, District 3
Party	Candidate	Votes	%
Democratic	Timothy Larson (incumbent)	22,018	60.7
Total	Jennifer L. Lovett	14,260	39.3
Republican	Jennifer L. Lovett	13,464	37.1
Independent Party	Jennifer L. Lovett	796	2.2
Total votes		36,278	100.0
Democratic hold			

==== District 4 ====
Incumbent Democratic state senator Steve Cassano, who was also the nominee of the Working Families Party, had represented the Connecticut's 4th State Senate District since 2011. He won reelection against Republican state representative Mark Tweedie, who was also the nominee of the Independent Party of Connecticut.

2018 Connecticut State Senate election, District 4
Party	Candidate	Votes	%
Total	Steve Cassano (incumbent)	23,257	54.2
Democratic	Steve Cassano	22,303	52.0
Working Families	Steve Cassano	954	2.2
Total	Mark Tweedie	19,632	45.8
Republican	Mark Tweedie	18,612	43.4
Independent Party	Mark Tweedie	1,020	2.4
Total votes		42,889	100.0
Democratic hold			

==== District 5 ====
Incumbent Democratic state senator Beth Bye had represented the Connecticut's 5th State Senate District since 2011. She won reelection against Republican Philip Chabot, who was also the nominee of the Independent Party of Connecticut.

2018 Connecticut State Senate election, District 5
Party	Candidate	Votes	%
Democratic	Beth Bye (incumbent)	30,988	65.7
Total	Philip Chabot	16,192	34.3
Republican	Philip Chabot	15,471	32.8
Independent Party	Philip Chabot	721	1.5
Total votes		47,180	100.0
Democratic hold			

==== District 6 ====
Incumbent Democratic state senator Terry Gerratana, who was also the nominee of the Working Families Party, had represented the Connecticut's 6th State Senate District since 2011. She won reelection against Republican Robert Medley.

2018 Connecticut State Senate election, District 6
Party	Candidate	Votes	%
Total	Terry Gerratana (incumbent)	17,173	62.6
Democratic	Terry Gerratana	16,087	58.6
Working Families	Terry Gerratana	1,086	4.0
Republican	Robert Smedley	10,263	37.4
Total votes		27,436	100.0
Democratic hold			

==== District 7 ====
Incumbent Republican state senator John Kissel, who was also the nominee of the Independent Party of Connecticut, had represented the Connecticut's 7th State Senate District since 1993. He won reelection against former Democratic state representative Annie Hornish, who was also the nominee of the Working Families Party.

2018 Connecticut State Senate election, District 7
Party	Candidate	Votes	%
Total	John Kissel (incumbent)	22,004	54.4
Republican	John Kissel	21,072	52.1
Independent Party	John Kissel	932	2.3
Total	Annie Hornish	18,476	45.6
Democratic	Annie Hornish	17,416	43.0
Working Families	Annie Hornish	1,060	2.6
Total votes		40,480	100.0
Republican hold			

==== District 8 ====
Incumbent Republican state senator Kevin Witkos, who was also the nominee of the Independent Party of Connecticut, had represented the Connecticut's 8th State Senate District since 2009. He won reelection against Democratic nominee Melissa Osborn.

2018 Connecticut State Senate election, District 8
Party	Candidate	Votes	%
Total	Kevin Witkos (incumbent)	26,418	56.8
Republican	Kevin Witkos	25,242	54.3
Independent Party	Kevin Witkos	1,176	2.5
Democratic	Melissa Osborn	20,091	43.2
Total votes		46,509	100.0
Republican hold			

==== District 9 ====
Incumbent Democratic state senator Paul Doyle had represented the Connecticut's 9th State Senate District since 2011. He did not run for reelection in 2018. The open seat was won by Democratic state representative Matt Lesser, who was also the nominee of the Working Families Party, against Republican Ed Charamut.

2018 Connecticut State Senate election, District 9
Party	Candidate	Votes	%
Total	Matt Lesser	24,253	57.8
Democratic	Matt Lesser	22,734	54.2
Working Families	Matt Lesser	1,519	3.6
Republican	Ed Charamut	17,674	42.2
Total votes		41,927	100.0
Democratic hold			

==== District 10 ====
Incumbent Democratic state senator Gary Winfield, who was also the nominee of the Working Families Party, had represented the Connecticut's 10th State Senate District since 2014. He won reelection against Republican Douglas Losty.

2018 Connecticut State Senate election, District 10
Party	Candidate	Votes	%
Total	Gary Winfield (incumbent)	20,182	88.0
Democratic	Gary Winfield	19,284	84.1
Working Families	Gary Winfield	898	3.9
Republican	Douglas Losty	2,745	12.0
Total votes		22,927	100.0
Democratic hold			

==== District 11 ====
Incumbent Democratic state senator Martin Looney had represented the Connecticut's 11th State Senate District since 1993. He won reelection against Republican Erin Reilly.

2018 Connecticut State Senate election, District 11
Party	Candidate	Votes	%
Democratic	Martin Looney (incumbent)	23,787	77.9
Republican	Erin Reilly	6,758	22.1
Total votes		30,545	100.0
Democratic hold			

==== District 12 ====
Incumbent Democratic state senator Ted Kennedy, Jr. had represented the Connecticut's 12th State Senate District since 2015. He did not run for reelection in 2018. The open seat was won by former Democrat Christine Cohen, who was also the nominee of the Working Families Party, against Republican Adam Greenberg, who was also the nominee of the Independent Party of Connecticut.

2018 Connecticut State Senate election, District 12
Party	Candidate	Votes	%
Total	Christine Cohen	25,265	51.4
Democratic	Christine Cohen	24,289	49.4
Working Families	Christine Cohen	976	2.0
Total	Adam Greenberg	23,933	48.6
Republican	Adam Greenberg	22,967	46.7
Independent Party	Adam Greenberg	966	2.0
Total votes		49,198	100.0
Democratic hold			

==== District 13 ====
Incumbent Republican state senator Len Suzio, who was also the nominee of the Independent Party of Connecticut, had represented the Connecticut's 13th State Senate District since 2017. He was defeated for reelection by Democratic nominee Mary Daugherty Abrams, who was also the nominee of the Working Families Party.

2018 Connecticut State Senate election, District 13
Party	Candidate	Votes	%
Total	Mary Daugherty Abrams	19,502	52.4
Democratic	Mary Daugherty Abrams	18,381	49.4
Working Families	Mary Daugherty Abrams	1,121	3.0
Total	Len Suzio (Incumbent)	17,708	47.6
Republican	Len Suzio	16,866	45.3
Independent Party	Len Suzio	842	2.3
Total votes		37,210	100.0
Democratic gain from Republican			

==== District 14 ====
Incumbent Democratic state senator Gayle Slossberg had represented the Connecticut's 14th State Senate District since 2005. She did not run for reelection in 2018. The open seat was won by former Democratic state representative James Maroney, who was also the nominee of the Working Families Party, against Republican state representative Pam Staneski.

2018 Connecticut State Senate election, District 14
Party	Candidate	Votes	%
Total	James Maroney	21,926	51.2
Democratic	James Maroney	20,502	47.9
Working Families	James Maroney	854	2.0
Independent Party	James Maroney	570	1.3
Republican	Pam Staneski	20,888	48.8
Total votes		42,814	100.0
Democratic hold			

==== District 15 ====
Incumbent Democratic state senator Joan Hartley had represented the Connecticut's 15th State Senate District since 2001. He won reelection against Independent Party of Connecticut nominee James Russell.

2018 Connecticut State Senate election, District 15
Party	Candidate	Votes	%
Democratic	Joan Hartley (incumbent)	16,426	84.7
Independent Party	James Russell	2,963	15.3
Total votes		19,389	100.0
Democratic hold			

==== District 16 ====
Incumbent Republican state senator Joe Markley had represented the Connecticut's 16th State Senate District since 2011. He did not run for reelection in 2018. The open seat was won by Republican Rob Sampson, who was also the nominee of the Independent Party of Connecticut, against Democratic nominee Vickie Orsini Nardello, who was also the nominee of the Working Families Party.

2018 Connecticut State Senate election, District 16
Party	Candidate	Votes	%
Total	Rob Sampson	23,988	56.7
Republican	Rob Sampson	23,099	54.6
Independent Party	Rob Sampson	889	2.1
Total	Vickie Orsini Nardello	18,332	43.3
Democratic	Vickie Orsini Nardello	17,162	40.6
Working Families	Vickie Orsini Nardello	1,170	2.8
Total votes		42,320	100.0
Republican hold			

==== District 17 ====
Incumbent Republican state senator George Logan, who was also the nominee of the Independent Party of Connecticut, had represented the Connecticut's 17th State Senate District since 2017. He won reelection against Democratic nominee Jorge Cabrera, who was also the nominee of the Working Families Party. The apparent winner changed after election night and was decided by a recount.

2018 Connecticut State Senate election, District 17
Party	Candidate	Votes	%
Total	George Logan (incumbent)	18,531	50.1
Republican	George Logan	17,544	47.4
Independent Party	George Logan	987	2.7
Total	Jorge Cabrera	18,446	49.9
Democratic	Jorge Cabrera	17,623	47.7
Working Families	Jorge Cabrera	823	2.2
Total votes		36,977	100.0
Republican hold			

==== District 18 ====
Incumbent Republican state senator Heather Somers, who was also the nominee of the Independent Party of Connecticut, had represented the Connecticut's 18th State Senate District since 2017. She won reelection against Democratic nominee Robert Statchen, who was also the nominee of the Working Families Party. The apparent winner changed after election night and was decided by a recount.

2018 Connecticut State Senate election, District 18
Party	Candidate	Votes	%
Total	Heather Somers (incumbent)	20,887	54.7
Republican	Heather Somers	19,584	51.3
Independent Party	Heather Somers	1,303	3.4
Total	Robert Statchen	17,276	45.3
Democratic	Robert Statchen	16,502	43.2
Working Families	Robert Statchen	774	2.0
Total votes		38,163	100.0
Republican hold			

==== District 19 ====
Incumbent Democratic state senator Catherine Osten, who was also the nominee of the Working Families Party, had represented the Connecticut's 19th State Senate District since 2011. She won reelection against Republican Mark Lounsbury, who was also the nominee of the Independent Party of Connecticut.

2018 Connecticut State Senate election, District 19
Party	Candidate	Votes	%
Total	Catherine Osten (incumbent)	21,389	57.9
Democratic	Catherine Osten	19,769	53.5
Working Families	Catherine Osten	1,620	4.4
Total	Mark Lounsbury	15,567	42.1
Republican	Mark Lounsbury	14,817	40.1
Independent Party	Mark Lounsbury	750	2.0
Total votes		36,956	100.0
Democratic hold			

==== District 20 ====
Incumbent Republican state senator Paul Formica, who was also the nominee of the Independent Party of Connecticut, had represented the Connecticut's 20th State Senate District since 2015. He won reelection against Democratic nominee Martha Marx, who was also the nominee of the Working Families Party.

2018 Connecticut State Senate election, District 20
Party	Candidate	Votes	%
Total	Paul Formica (incumbent)	20,746	52.0
Republican	Paul Formica	19,598	49.1
Independent Party	Paul Formica	1,148	2.9
Total	Martha Marx	19,164	48.0
Democratic	Martha Marx	18,203	45.6
Working Families	Martha Marx	961	2.4
Total votes		39,910	100.0
Republican hold			

==== District 21 ====
Incumbent Republican state senator Kevin C. Kelly had represented the Connecticut's 21st State Senate District since 2011. He won reelection against Democratic nominee Monica Tujak Brill.

2018 Connecticut State Senate election, District 21
Party	Candidate	Votes	%
Republican	Kevin C. Kelly (incumbent)	24,589	56.7
Democratic	Monica Tujak Brill	18,805	43.3
Total votes		43,394	100.0
Republican hold			

==== District 22 ====
Incumbent Democratic state senator Marilyn Moore, who was also the nominee of the Working Families Party, had represented the Connecticut's 22nd State Senate District since 2011. She won reelection against Republican Rich Deecken, who was also the nominee of the Independent Party of Connecticut.

2018 Connecticut State Senate election, District 22
Party	Candidate	Votes	%
Total	Marilyn Moore (incumbent)	19,795	59.1
Democratic	Marilyn Moore	19,130	57.1
Working Families	Marilyn Moore	665	2.0
Total	Rich Deecken	13,712	40.9
Republican	Rich Deecken	13,155	39.3
Independent Party	Rich Deecken	557	1.7
Total votes		33,507	100.0
Democratic hold			

==== District 23 ====
Incumbent Democratic state senator Edwin Gomes had represented the Connecticut's 23rd State Senate District since 2015. He did not run for reelection in 2018. The open seat was won by Democratic nominee Dennis Bradley against Republican John Rodriguez.

2018 Connecticut State Senate election, District 23
Party	Candidate	Votes	%
Democratic	Dennis Bradley (incumbent)	14,456	86.8
Republican	John Rodriguez	2,199	13.2
Total votes		16,655	100.0
Democratic hold			

==== District 24 ====
Incumbent Republican state senator Michael McLachlan, who was also the nominee of the Independent Party of Connecticut, had represented the Connecticut's 24th State Senate District since 2009. He was defeated for reelection by Democratic nominee Julie Kushner, who was also the nominee of the Working Families Party.

2018 Connecticut State Senate election, District 24
Party	Candidate	Votes	%
Total	Julie Kushner	17,186	54.0
Democratic	Julie Kushner	16,400	51.5
Working Families	Julie Kushner	786	2.5
Total	Michael McLachlan (incumbent)	14,658	46.0
Republican	Michael McLachlan	14,077	44.2
Independent Party	Michael McLachlan	581	1.8
Total votes		31,844	100.0
Democratic gain from Republican			

==== District 25 ====
Incumbent Democratic state senator Bob Duff, who was also the nominee of the Working Families Party, had represented the Connecticut's 25th State Senate District since 2005. He won reelection against Republican Mark Marc D'Amelio, who was also the nominee of the Independent Party of Connecticut.

2018 Connecticut State Senate election, District 25
Party	Candidate	Votes	%
Total	Bob Duff (incumbent)	24,444	63.2
Democratic	Bob Duff	23,629	61.0
Working Families	Bob Duff	815	2.1
Total	Marc D'Amelio	14,261	36.8
Republican	Marc D'Amelio	13,627	35.2
Independent Party	Marc D'Amelio	634	1.6
Total votes		38,705	100.0
Democratic hold			

==== District 26 ====
2018 election results by precinct, CT Senate district 26: Haskell 50–60% 60–70% / Boucher 50–60% 60–70%

Incumbent Republican state senator Toni Boucher, who was also the nominee of the Independent Party of Connecticut, had represented the Connecticut's 26th State Senate District since 2009. She was defeated for reelection by Democratic nominee Will Haskell. Haskell became the first Democrat to hold this seat since Edward J. Kelley in 1943.

2018 Connecticut State Senate election, District 26
Party	Candidate	Votes	%
Democratic	Will Haskell	28,159	53.4
Total	Toni Boucher (incumbent)	24,574	46.6
Republican	Toni Boucher	23,525	35.2
Independent Party	Toni Boucher	1,049	1.6
Total votes		52,733	100.0
Democratic gain from Republican			

==== District 27 ====
Incumbent Democratic state senator Carlo Leone had represented the Connecticut's 27th State Senate District since 2011. He won reelection against Republican Jerry Bosak, who was also the nominee of the Independent Party of Connecticut, and Green candidate Cora Santaguida.

2018 Connecticut State Senate election, District 27
Party	Candidate	Votes	%
Democratic	Carlo Leone (incumbent)	22,161	64.8
Total	Jerry Bosak	11,649	34.1
Republican	Jerry Bosak	11,101	32.5
Independent Party	Jerry Bosak	548	1.6
Green	Cora Santaguida	392	1.1
Total votes		34,202	100.0
Democratic hold			

==== District 28 ====
Incumbent Republican state senator Tony Hwang, who was also the nominee of the Independent Party of Connecticut, had represented the Connecticut's 28th State Senate District since 2015. He won reelection against Democratic nominee Michelle Lapine McCabe, who was also the nominee of the Working Families Party.

2018 Connecticut State Senate election, District 30
Party	Candidate	Votes	%
Total	Tony Hwang (incumbent)	25,277	52.0
Republican	Tony Hwang	24,105	49.6
Independent Party	Tony Hwang	1,172	2.4
Total	Michelle Lapine McCabe	23,336	48.0
Democratic	Michelle Lapine McCabe	22,610	46.5
Working Families	Michelle Lapine McCabe	726	1.5
Total votes		48,613	100.0
Republican hold			

==== District 29 ====
Incumbent Democratic state senator Mae Flexer, who was also the nominee of the Working Families Party, had represented the Connecticut's 29th State Senate District since 2011. He won reelection against Republican David Coderre, who was also the nominee of the Independent Party of Connecticut.

2018 Connecticut State Senate election, District 29
Party	Candidate	Votes	%
Total	Mae Flexer (incumbent)	18,915	56.3
Democratic	Mae Flexer	17,794	53.0
Working Families	Mae Flexer	1,121	3.3
Total	David Coderre	14,679	43.7
Republican	David Coderre	13,706	40.8
Independent Party	David Coderre	973	2.9
Total votes		33,594	100.0
Democratic hold			

==== District 30 ====
Incumbent Republican state senator Craig Miner, who was also the nominee of the Independent Party of Connecticut, had represented the Connecticut's 30th State Senate District since 2017. He won reelection against Democratic nominee David Lawson, who was also the nominee of the Working Families Party. The apparent winner changed after election night and was decided by a recount.

2018 Connecticut State Senate election, District 30
Party	Candidate	Votes	%
Total	Craig Miner (incumbent)	23,121	53.6
Republican	Craig Miner	22,068	51.2
Independent Party	Craig Miner	1,053	2.4
Total	David Lawson	20,011	46.4
Democratic	David Lawson	19,039	44.1
Working Families	David Lawson	972	2.3
Total votes		43,132	100.0
Republican hold			

==== District 31 ====
Incumbent Republican state senator Henri Martin, who was also the nominee of the Independent Party of Connecticut, had represented the Connecticut's 31st State Senate District since 2015. He won reelection against Democratic nominee Christopher Wright.

2018 Connecticut State Senate election, District 31
Party	Candidate	Votes	%
Total	Henri Martin (incumbent)	22,367	58.7
Republican	Henri Martin	21,317	55.9
Independent Party	Henri Martin	1,050	2.8
Democratic	Christopher Wright	15,762	41.3
Total votes		38,129	100.0
Republican hold			

==== District 32 ====
Incumbent Republican state senator Eric Berthel had represented the Connecticut's 32nd State Senate District since 2017. He won reelection against Democratic nominee Catherine De Carli.

2018 Connecticut State Senate election, District 32
Party	Candidate	Votes	%
Republican	Eric Berthel (incumbent)	27,598	61.2
Democratic	Catherine De Carli	17,501	38.8
Total votes		45,099	100.0
Republican hold			

==== District 33 ====
Incumbent Republican state senator Art Linares had represented the Connecticut's 33rd State Senate District since 2013. He did not run for reelection in 2018. The open seat was won by Democratic nominee Norm Needleman against Republican Melissa Ziobron, who was also the nominee of the Independent Party of Connecticut.

2018 Connecticut State Senate election, District 33
Party	Candidate	Votes	%
Democratic	Norm Needleman	25,280	50.1
Total	Melissa Ziobron	25,195	49.9
Republican	Melissa Ziobron	23,906	47.4
Independent Party	Melissa Ziobron	1,289	2.6
Total votes		50,475	100.0
Democratic gain from Republican			

==== District 34 ====
Incumbent Republican state senator Len Fasano, who was also the nominee of the Independent Party of Connecticut, had represented the Connecticut's 34th State Senate District since 2003. He won reelection against Democratic nominee Aili McKeen.

2018 Connecticut State Senate election, District 34
Party	Candidate	Votes	%
Total	Len Fasano (incumbent)	23,853	58.5
Republican	Len Fasano	22,826	56.0
Independent Party	Len Fasano	1,027	2.5
Democratic	Aili McKeen	16,939	41.5
Total votes		40,792	100.0
Republican hold			

==== District 35 ====
Incumbent Republican state senator Tony Guglielmo had represented the Connecticut's 35th State Senate District since 1993. He did not run for reelection in 2018. The open seat was won by Republican Dan Champagne against Democrat John Perrier, who was also the nominee of the Working Families Party and the Independent Party of Connecticut.

2018 Connecticut State Senate election, District 35
Party	Candidate	Votes	%
Republican	Dan Champagne	22,837	51.0
Total	John Perrier	21,938	49.0
Democratic	John Perrier	19,999	44.7
Working Families	John Perrier	1,065	2.4
Independent Party	John Perrier	874	2.0
Total votes		44,775	100.0
Republican hold			

==== District 36 ====
Incumbent Republican state senator Scott Frantz, who was also the nominee of the Independent Party of Connecticut, had represented the Connecticut's 36th State Senate District since 2009. He was defeated for reelection by Democratic nominee Alexandra Kasser. Kasser became the first Democrat to ever win this district since its creation in 1942.

2018 Connecticut State Senate election, District 36
Party	Candidate	Votes	%
Democratic	Alexandra Kasser	22,261	50.4
Total	Scott Frantz (incumbent)	21,645	49.0
Republican	Scott Frantz	21,002	47.6
Independent Party	Scott Frantz	643	1.5
Green	Megan Cassano	238	0.5
Total votes		44,144	100.0
Democratic gain from Republican			

== Aftermath ==
=== Reactions ===
The Hartford Courier called the results a "growing rout for Republicans in Connecticut". Democratic Senate President Martin Looney called the election a "big night for Democrats". Looney also saw the "Trump factor" as a reason for the Democrats' success. Governor Malloy said that Connecticut voters had "unequivocally rejected the hateful politics and backwards policies espoused by the Trump administration and national Republicans."

After the election, several Republicans criticized the state party's strategy and field operations during the 2018 state elections. Danbury Mayor Mark Boughton, who finished second in the 2018 Republican primary for governor, criticized the unwillingness of state Republicans to distance themselves from President Trump, who was unpopular in the state. He said: "We let Trump take over this race. It became a referendum on Trump and you’re not going [to] win that way."

=== Recounts ===
In the 17th State Senate district, election night results showed State Senator George Logan trailing his Democratic challenger Jorge Cabrera by over 200 votes. After reporting mistakes in Ansonia were corrected, Logan led the race by 65 votes. The recount increased the margin of victory to 85 votes. Democrats considered further legal actions but chose not pursue them, after Cabrera conceded to Logan on November 14, 2018.

In the 33rd State Senate district, election night results showed Democrat Norman Needleman beating by 303 votes, outside of the automatic recount margin. According to state law, an automatic recount is required if the margin of victory is smaller than 0.5% or less than 20 votes. The Essex Registrar of Voters had reported incorrect returns to the Secretary of State's office. The corrected results showed Norman Needleman leading by just 137 votes, triggering an automatic recount. The recount did not change the result, but further reduced the margin of victory to 85 votes.

=== 2019 legislative session ===
Three Democratic state senators, Tim Larson, Beth Bye and Terry Gerratana, resigned on January 8, 2019, in order to join newly elected Governor Ned Lamont's administration. These resignations reduced the Democratic majority to 20–13. According to state law, a special election must be conducted to fill the vacant seats. The governor must call for an election no later than 10 days after the vacancy happens. All special elections must be held no later than 46 days after a governor's declaration. The special elections were held on February 26, 2019. Democrats Saud Anwar and Derek Slap won the 3rd and 5th State Senate district respectively, while Republican Gennaro Bizzarro flipped the 6th State Senate district. The special elections thus resulted in a 22-14 Democratic majority.

On January 9, 2019, 33 senators and 149 state representatives were sworn in as members of the Connecticut General Assembly. The newly elected General Assembly was sworn in with the most female members of all time.
