= 2020 Connecticut Senate election =

- November 3, 2020

All 36 seats in the Connecticut State Senate 19 seats needed for a majority
- Turnout: 79.70% (▲14.47%)
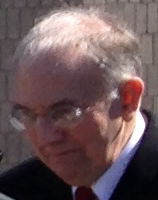

	Majority party	Minority party
Leader	Martin Looney	Len Fasano (retired)
Party	Democratic	Republican
Leader since	January 7, 2015	January 7, 2015
Leader's seat	11th District	34th District
Last election	23	13
Seats before	22	14
Seats after	24	12
Seat change	▲2	▼2
Popular vote	925,028	737,405
Percentage	54.8%	43.7%
Swing	▲1.7	▲0.3
- Results: Democratic gain Democratic hold Republican hold
President pro tempore of the Senate before election
Martin Looney
Democratic
Elected President pro tempore of the Senate
Martin Looney
Democratic

The 2020 Connecticut State Senate election took place on November 3, 2020. Part of the biennial 2020 United States elections. Connecticut voters elected senators in all of the 36 State Senate districts. State senators serve two-year terms in the Connecticut State Senate, with all 36 of the seats up for election each cycle. The primary elections on August 11, 2020, determined which candidates appeared on the ballot for the general election. Four primary elections were cancelled, including three Republican primary elections. As a result, four Incumbent candidates ran uncontested.

== Retirements ==
One incumbent did not seek re-election in 2020.

=== Republicans ===
1. District 34: Len Fasano retired.

== Predictions ==
Source	Ranking	As of
The Cook Political Report	Safe D	October 21, 2020

== Results ==
↓
24	12
Democratic	Republican

Parties	Candidates	Seats				Popular Vote		
Parties	Candidates	2018	2020	+/-	Strength	Vote	%	Change
Democratic	35	22	24	▲2	61.11%	925,028	54.82%	▲1.72%
Republican	33	14	12	▼2	38.89%	737,405	43.70%	▲0.28%
Independent Party	4 (Note: In addition, the Independent Party of Connecticut cross-endorsed 15 candidates, 6 Democrats and 9 Republicans.)	0	0	Steady	0.00%	27,037	1.60%	▼0.34%
Working Families	0 (Note: In addition, the Working Families Party of Connecticut cross-endorsed 17 candidates, all Democrats.)	0	0	Steady	0.00%	16,695	0.99%	▼0.47%
Libertarian	3	0	0	Steady	0.00%	2,567	0.15%	Steady
Green	1	0	0	Steady	0.00%	952	0.06%	▼0.02%
Other parties and Write-ins	5	0	0	Steady	0.00%	2,877	0.17%	Steady
Total	81	36	36	0	100.00%	1,687,529	100.00%	-

Two seats flipped from Republican to Democratic, resulting in a Democratic majority of 24–12 in the Senate chamber. Making the 2020 election the second election in a row where the Democratic majority increased. Republicans have now lost 6 seats in the past 2 elections. 1 Senator, Len Fasano (R-34th), did not attempt to run for re-election.

=== Composition ===
Affiliation	Party (Shading indicates majority caucus)		Total	
Affiliation	Democratic	Republican	Total	Vacant
Before Election	22	14	36	0
After Election	24	12	36	0
Change	▲2	▼2		Steady

=== Overview ===
==== District 1 ====
Incumbent Democratic senator John Fonfara has represented Connecticut's 1st State Senate District since 1997. He won re-election against Republican Barbara Ruhe and Green Party candidate Mary L. Sanders.

2020 Connecticut State Senate election, District 1
Party	Candidate	Votes	%
Democratic	John Fonfara (incumbent)	20,584	71.78
Republican	Barbara Ruhe	7,141	24.90
Green	Mary L. Sanders	952	3.32
Total votes		28,677	100.00
Democratic hold			

==== District 2 ====
After the Republican primary was cancelled, Democratic Incumbent Douglas McCroy won re-election to a third term uncontested. This was the 2nd election in a row that McCroy ran uncontested. McCroy has represented the 2nd District since 2017.

2020 Connecticut State Senate election, District 2
Party	Candidate	Votes	%
Democratic	Douglas McCrory (incumbent)	33,839	100.00
Democratic hold			

==== District 3 ====
Democratic Incumbent Saud Anwar cruised to re-election for a 2nd term after the Republican primary was cancelled. Anwar has represented the 2nd District since 2019. Anwar also received the nomination from the Working Families Party.

2020 Connecticut State Senate election, District 3
Party	Candidate	Votes	%
Democratic	Saud Anwar (incumbent)	31,543	89.45
Working Families	Saud Anwar (incumbent)	3,720	10.55
Total votes		35,263	100.00
Democratic hold			

==== District 4 ====
Incumbent Democrat Steve Cassano won re-election to a sixth term over Republican challenger Matthew M. Corey, Libertarian challenger Harold S. Harris, and Kelly Green from the Reclaim party. Cassano has represented the 4th District since 2011. Cassano also received the nomination from the Working Families Party.

2020 Connecticut State Senate election, District 4
Party	Candidate	Votes	%
Democratic	Steve Cassano (incumbent)	30,484	56.34
Republican	Matthew M. Corey	20,737	38.33
Working Families	Steve Cassano (incumbent)	1,230	2.27
Libertarian	Harold S. Harris	830	1.53
Reclaim Party	Kelly Green	823	1.52
Total votes		54,104	100.00
Democratic hold			

==== District 5 ====
Democratic Incumbent Derek Slap won re-election to a 2nd term over Republican challenger Phillip Chabot and Independent challenger Joelle Nawrocki. Slap has represented the 5th District since 2019

2020 Connecticut State Senate election, District 5
Party	Candidate	Votes	%
Democratic	Derek Slap (incumbent)	37,360	65.43
Republican	Phillip Chabot	17,961	31.45
Independent Party	Joelle Nawrocki	1,780	3.12
Total votes		57,101	100.00
Democratic hold			

==== District 6 ====
Democratic newcomer and State Representative Rick Lopes defeated Republican Incumbent Gennaro Bizzarro and helped increase the Democratic majority. Bizzaro has represented the 6th District since 2019. Rick Lopes also received the nomination from the Working Families Party.

2020 Connecticut State Senate election, District 6
Party	Candidate	Votes	%
Democratic	Rick Lopes	19,621	53.04
Republican	Gennaro Bizzarro (incumbent)	16,372	44.26
Working Families	Rick Lopes	1,000	2.70
Total votes		36,993	100.00
Democratic gain from Republican			

==== District 7 ====
Republican Incumbent John A. Kissel won re-election to a 15th term after defeating Democratic newcomer Frederick A. Moffa. Kissel has represented the 7th District since 1993. Kissel also received the nomination of the Independent Party.While Moffa also received the nomination of the Working Families Party.

2020 Connecticut State Senate election, District 7
Party	Candidate	Votes	%
Democratic	Frederick A. Moffa	22,890	43.62
Republican	John A. Kissel (incumbent)	26,624	50.74
Independent Party	John A. Kissel (incumbent)	1,703	3.25
Working Families	Frederick A. Moffa	1,254	2.39
Total votes		52,471	100.00
Republican hold			

==== District 8 ====
Republican Incumbent Kevin Witkos won re-election to a seventh term after defeating Democratic newcomer Mellisa E. Osborne as well as Independent candidate Keith James McConnell. Witkos has represented the 8th District since 2009.

2020 Connecticut State Senate election, District 8
Party	Candidate	Votes	%
Republican	Kevin Witkos (incumbent)	29,694	51.54%
Democratic	Melissa E. Osborne	26,811	46.53%
Independent Party	Keith James McConnell	1,111	1.93%
Total votes		57,616	100.00%
Republican hold			

==== District 9 ====
Democratic Incumbent Matt Lesser won re-election to a 2nd term after defeating Republican challenger Richie Ruglio. Lesser has represented the 9th District since 2019.Richie Ruglio also received the nomination of the Independent Party. While Matt Lesser received the nomination of the Working Families Party.

2020 Connecticut State Senate election, District 9
Party	Candidate	Votes	%
Democratic	Matt Lesser (incumbent)	29,473	54.85
Republican	Richie Ruglio	21,609	40.22
Independent Party	Richie Ruglio	1,139	2.12
Working Families	Matt Lesser (incumbent)	1,509	2.81
Total votes		53,730	100.00
Democratic hold			

==== District 10 ====
Democratic Incumbent Gary Winfield won re-election to a third term after defeating Republican challenger Carlos M. Alvarado in a landslide victory. Winfield has represented the 10th District since 2017. Winfield also received the nomination of the Working Families Party.

2020 Connecticut State Senate election, District 10
Party	Candidate	Votes	%
Democratic	Gary Winfield (incumbent)	23,237	78.14
Republican	Carlos M. Alvarado	4,081	13.72
Working Families	Gary Winfield (incumbent)	1,509	2.81
Petitioning candidate	Jason W. Bartlett	1,246	4.19
Total votes		30,073	100.00
Democratic hold			

==== District 11 ====
Democratic Incumbent and President pro tempore Martin Looney won re-election to a 15th term after defeating Republican challenger Jameson White and Petitioning candidate Alexander Taubes in a landslide victory. Looney has represented the 11th District since 1993.

2020 Connecticut State Senate election, District 11
Party	Candidate	Votes	%
Democratic	Martin Looney (incumbent)	27,336	74.70
Republican	Jameson White	8,462	23.12
Petitioning candidate	Alexander Taubes	795	2.17
Total votes		36,593	100.00
Democratic hold			

==== District 12 ====
Democratic Incumbent Christine Cohen won re-election to a 2nd term after defeating Republican challenger Joe LaPorta. Cohen has represented the 12th District since 2019.Cohen also received the nomination of the Independent Party as well as the Working Families Party.

2020 Connecticut State Senate election, District 12
Party	Candidate	Votes	%
Democratic	Christine Cohen (incumbent)	31,310	53.69
Republican	Joe LaPorta	25,113	43.07
Independent Party	Christine Cohen (incumbent)	1,070	1.83
Working Families	Christine Cohen (incumbent)	820	1.41
Total votes		58,313	100.00
Democratic hold			

==== District 13 ====
Democratic Incumbent Mary Abrams won re-election to a 2nd term after defeating Republican challenger Len Suzio. Abrams has represented the 13th District since 2019.Abrams also received the nomination of the Working Families Party.While Len Suzio also received the nomination of the Independent Party.

2020 Connecticut State Senate election, District 13
Party	Candidate	Votes	%
Democratic	Mary Abrams (incumbent)	23,831	50.42
Republican	Len Suzio	20,799	44.01
Independent Party	Len Suzio	1,532	3.24
Working Families	Mary Abrams (incumbent)	1,102	2.33
Total votes		47,264	100.00
Democratic hold			

==== District 14 ====
Democratic Incumbent James Maroney won re-election to a 2nd term after defeating Republican challenger Michael Southworth. Maroney has represented the 14th District since 2019. Maroney also received the nomination of the Independent and Working Families Party.

2020 Connecticut State Senate election, District 14
Party	Candidate	Votes	%
Democratic	James Maroney (incumbent)	28,388	53.06
Republican	Michael Southworth	22,830	42.67
Independent Party	James Maroney (incumbent)	1,428	2.67
Working Families	James Maroney (incumbent)	854	1.60
Total votes		53,500	100.00
Democratic hold			

==== District 15 ====
Democratic Incumbent Joan V. Hartley won an uncontested re-election resulting in his eleventh term, since the Republican primary was cancelled. Hartley has represented the 15th District since 2001. Hartley also received the nomination of the Independent Party.

2020 Connecticut State Senate election, District 15
Party	Candidate	Votes	%
Democratic	Joan V. Hartley (incumbent)	20,367	81.99
Independent Party	Joan V. Hartley (incumbent)	4,473	18.01
Total votes		24,840	100.00
Democratic hold			

==== District 16 ====
Republican Incumbent Rob Sampson won re-election to a second term over Democratic challenger Jack Perry. Write in candidate Paul J. Small received 4 votes. Sampson has represented the 16th District since 2019.Jack Perry also received the nomination of the Independent Party. As well as the Working Families Party.

2020 Connecticut State Senate election, District 16
Party	Candidate	Votes	%
Democratic	Jack Perry	22,717	41.83
Republican	Rob Sampson (incumbent)	29,209	53.79
Independent Party	Jack Perry	1,537	2.83
Working Families	Jack Perry	839	1.54
Write-in candidate	Paul J. Small	4	0.01
Total votes		57,242	100.00
Republican hold			

==== District 17 ====
Democratic newcomer Jorge Cabrera defeated Republican Incumbent George Logan. Logan had represented the 17th District since 2017. The 17th District seat is one of two that flipped from Republican to Democrat. Logan also received the nomination of the Independent Party, while Jorge Cabrera received the nomination of the Working Families Party.

2020 Connecticut State Senate election, District 17
Party	Candidate	Votes	%
Democratic	Jorge Cabrera	23,810	49.61
Republican	George Logan (incumbent)	21,441	44.68
Independent Party	George Logan (incumbent)	1,517	3.16
Working Families	Jorge Cabrera	1,224	2.55
Total votes		47,992	100.00
Democratic gain from Republican			

==== District 18 ====
Incumbent Republican Heather Somers won re-election to a third term over Democratic newcomer Bob Statchen. Somers has represented the 18th District since 2017. Statchen also received the nomination from the Independent and Working Families Parties.

2020 Connecticut State Senate election, District 18
Party	Candidate	Votes	%
Democratic	Bob Statchen	23,942	47.60
Republican	Heather Somers (incumbent)	26,377	52.42
Independent Party	Bob Statchen	883	1.75
Working Families	Bob Statchen	677	1.35
Total votes		50,319	100.00
Republican hold			

==== District 19 ====
Democratic Incumbent Cathy Osten won re-election to a fifth term after defeating Republican challenger Steve Weir as well as Libertarian candidate William H. Russell. Osten has represented the 19th District since 2013.Osten also received the nomination of the Working Families Party.

2020 Connecticut State Senate election, District 19
Party	Candidate	Votes	%
Democratic	Cathy Osten (incumbent)	24,456	50.51
Republican	Steve Weir	21,680	44.77
Working Families	Cathy Osten (incumbent)	1,392	2.87
Libertarian	William H. Russell	892	1.84
Total votes		48,420	100.00
Democratic hold			

==== District 20 ====
Republican Incumbent Paul Formica won re-election to a fourth term after narrowly beating out Democratic challenger Martha Marx in a close election. Formica has represented the 20th District since 2015.Marx also received the nomination of the Independent Party.

2020 Connecticut State Senate election, District 20
Party	Candidate	Votes	%
Democratic	Martha Marx	23,399	46.09
Republican	Paul M. Formica (incumbent)	25,680	50.58
Independent Party	Joseph Taraya	586	1.15
Working Families	Martha Marx	1,104	2.17
Total votes		50,769	100.00
Republican hold			

==== District 21 ====
Republican Incumbent Kevin C. Kelly won re-election to a sixth term uncontested after the Democratic primary was cancelled. Kelly has represented the 21st District since 2011.

2020 Connecticut State Senate election, District 21
Party	Candidate	Votes	%
Republican	Kevin C. Kelly (incumbent)	37,602	100.00
Republican hold			

==== District 22 ====
Democratic Incumbent Marilyn Moore won re-election to a fourth term against Republican challenger Steven S. Choi as well as Libertarian candidate Stephen Dincher. Moore has represented the 22nd District since 2015.

2020 Connecticut State Senate election, District 22
Party	Candidate	Votes	%
Democratic	Marilyn Moore (incumbent)	28,438	61.34
Republican	Steven S. Choi	17,070	36.82
Libertarian	Stephen Dincher	845	1.82
Write-in candidate	Devon Brown	9	0.02
Total votes		46,362	100.00
Democratic hold			

==== District 23 ====
Incumbent Democrat Dennis Bradley won re-election for a 2nd term after defeating Republican challenger Josiah Israel in a landslide victory. Bradley has represented the 23rd District since 2019.

2020 Connecticut State Senate election, District 23
Party	Candidate	Votes	%
Democratic	Dennis Bradley (incumbent)	20,317	83.53
Republican	Josiah Israel	4,006	16.47
Total votes		24,323	100.00
Democratic hold			

==== District 24 ====
Democratic Incumbent Julie Kushner won re-election to a 2nd term over Republican challenger Susan Chapman. Kushner has represented the 24th District since 2019.Kushner also received the nomination of the Working Families Party. While Chapman also received the nomination of the Independent Party.

2020 Connecticut State Senate election, District 24
Party	Candidate	Votes	%
Democratic	Julie Kushner (incumbent)	23,939	53.63
Republican	Susan Chapman	18,778	42.07
Independent Party	Susan Chapman	827	1.85
Working Families	Julie Kushner (incumbent)	1,091	2.44
Total votes		20,696	100.00
Democratic hold			

==== District 25 ====
Senate Majority leader Bob Duff won re-election to a 9th term over Republican challenger Ellie Kousidis. Duff has represented the 25th District since 2005.Kousidis also received the nomination of the Independent Party.

2020 Connecticut State Senate election, District 25
Party	Candidate	Votes	%
Democratic	Bob Duff (Incumbent)	29,788	60.30
Republican	Ellie Kousidis	18,954	37.17
Independent Party	Ellie Kousidis	1,324	2.60
Total votes		49,412	100.00
Democratic hold			

==== District 26 ====
Incumbent Democratic senator Will Haskell won re-election to a 2nd term against Republican candidate Kim Healy. Haskell has represented the 26th District since 2019.Healy also received the nomination of the Independent Party.

2020 Connecticut State Senate election, District 26
Party	Candidate	Votes	%
Democratic	Will Haskell (Incumbent)	38,227	58.40
Republican	Kim Healy	26,095	39.46
Independent Party	Kim Healy	1,454	2.20
Total votes		65,425	100.00
Democratic hold			

==== District 27 ====
Incumbent Democratic senator Carlo Leone won re-election to a sixth term after defeating Republican challenger Eva Maldonado. Leone has represented the 27th District since 2011.Maldonado also received the nomination of the Independent Party. Carlo Leone would eventually resign to take a job with the Lamont administration.

2020 Connecticut State Senate election, District 27
Party	Candidate	Votes	%
Democratic	Carlo Leone (Incumbent)	29,279	63.83
Republican	Eva Maldonado	15,307	33.37
Independent Party	Eva Maldonado	1,287	2.81
Total votes		39,457	100.00
Democratic hold			

==== District 28 ====
Incumbent Republican Tony Hwang won re-election to a fourth term after beating out Democratic challenger Michelle Lapine McCabe and won re-election. Hwang has represented the 28th District since 2015.

2020 Connecticut State Senate election, District 28
Party	Candidate	Votes	%
Democratic	Michelle Lapine McCabe	29,759	48.30
Republican	Tony Hwang (incumbent)	31,857	51.70
Total votes		61,616	100.00
Republican hold			

==== District 29 ====
Democratic Incumbent Mae Flexer won re-election to a fourth term after defeating Republican/Independent challenger Jessica Alba. Flexer has represented the 29th District since 2015. Flexer also received the nomination of the Working Families Party. While Jessica Alba also received the nomination of the Independent Party.

2020 Connecticut State Senate election, District 29
Party	Candidate	Votes	%
Democratic	Mae Flexer (incumbent)	19,617	49.07
Republican	Jessica Alba	17,862	44.68
Independent Party	Jessica Alba	1,241	3.10
Working Families	Mae Flexer (incumbent)	1,261	3.15
Total votes		39,981	100.00
Democratic hold			

==== District 30 ====
Republican Incumbent Craig Miner won re-election to a fourth term after defeating Democratic challenger David Gronbach as well as Independent Joseph Bongiorno. Miner has represented the 30th District since 2015.

2020 Connecticut State Senate election, District 30
Party	Candidate	Votes	%
Democratic	David Gronbach	24,158	44.90
Republican	Craig Miner (incumbent)	28,719	53.40
Independent Party	Joseph Bongiorno	937	1.70
Total votes		53,814	100.00
Republican hold			

==== District 31 ====
Republican Incumbent Henri Martin won re-election to a fourth term after defeating Democratic challenger Mary Fortier. Martin has represented the 31st District since 2015.

2020 Connecticut State Senate election, District 31
Party	Candidate	Votes	%
Democratic	Mary Fortier	21,589	41.90
Republican	Henri Martin (incumbent)	29,884	58.10
Total votes		51,473	100.00
Republican hold			

==== District 32 ====
Incumbent Republican Eric Berthel won re-election to a third term over Democratic challenger Jeff Desmarais. Berthel has represented the 32nd District since 2017.

2020 Connecticut State Senate election, District 32
Party	Candidate	Votes	%
Democratic	Jeff Desmarais	23,696	41.80
Republican	Eric Berthel (incumbent)	33,005	58.20
Total votes		56,701	100.00
Republican hold			

==== District 33 ====
Incumbent Democrat Norman Needleman won re-election to a 2nd term after beating out Republican challenger Brendan Saunders to get re-elected. Needleman has represented the 33rd District since 2019.

2020 Connecticut's 33rd State Senate district election
- Precinct results Needleman 50-60% 60-70% Saunders 50-60%

2020 Connecticut State Senate election, District 33
Party	Candidate	Votes	%
Democratic	Norman Needleman (Incumbent)	33,351	54.00
Republican	Brendan Saunders	28,432	46.00
Total votes		61,783	100.00
Democratic hold			

==== District 34 ====
Newcomer Republican Paul Cicarella Jr. defeated Democratic challenger April Capone. The winner of this election, Paul Cicarella Jr., will replace retiring Senate Minority leader and former president pro tempore, Len Fasano.

2020 Connecticut State Senate election, District 34
Party	Candidate	Votes	%
Democratic	April Capone	22,468	44.80
Republican	Paul Cicarella, Jr	27,691	55.20
Total votes		50,159	100.00
Republican hold			

==== District 35 ====
Republican Incumbent Dan Champagne won re-election to a 2nd term after beating out Democratic challenger Lisa Thomas. Champagne has represented the 35th District since 2019. Thomas also received the nomination of the Independent and Working Families Parties.

2020 Connecticut State Senate election, District 7
Party	Candidate	Votes	%
Democratic	Lisa Thomas	25,871	45.47
Republican	Dan Champagne (incumbent)	28,763	50.55
Independent Party	Lisa Thomas	1,208	2.12
Working Families	Lisa Thomas	1,059	1.86
Total votes		56,903	100.00
Republican hold			

==== District 36 ====
Democratic Incumbent Alex Kasser narrowly defeated Republican challenger Ryan Fazio to win re-election to a 2nd term in a tight race. Kasser has represented the 36th District since 2019.

2020 Connecticut State Senate election, District 36
Party	Candidate	Votes	%
Democratic	Alex Kasser (Incumbent)	29,133	51.40
Republican	Ryan Fazio	27,570	48.60
Total votes		56,703	100.00
Democratic hold			

== See also ==
- 2020 United States presidential election in Connecticut
- 2020 United States House of Representatives elections in Connecticut
