= Connecticut's 26th State Senate district =

American legislative district

Senator
Ceci Maher; D–Wilton

Connecticut's 26th State Senate district elects one member of the Connecticut State Senate. The district consists of the entirety of Westport, Wilton, Ridgefield, and Redding, and parts of Bethel, New Canaan and Weston. Previously, the 26th district comprised Norwalk, Wilton, New Canaan, and Easton. However, in the late 1970s Norwalk and Darien became the 25th district. It is currently represented by Democrat Ceci Maher since 2023.

== Senators from 1905 to the present ==
At some point shortly prior to 1905, Connecticut was redistricted. Fairfield County was previously represented in the 12th Senate District.

Senator	Party	Years of service	Hometown	Notes
Jeremiah Donovan	Democratic	1905–1909	Norwalk	Served in the United States House of Representatives, and as mayor of Norwalk
Joseph F. Silliman	Republican	1909–1911	New Canaan	
Jeremiah Donovan	Democratic	1911–1913	Norwalk	Served in the United States House of Representatives, and as mayor of Norwalk
Hanford S. Weed	Democratic	1913–1915	New Canaan	
Hubert E. Bishop	Republican	1915–1917	Norwalk	
Charles E. Williamson	Republican	1917–1921	Darien	
Nehemiah Candee	Republican	1921–1923	Easton	
John H. Behre	Republican	1923–1925	New Canaan	
Frank W. Gregory	Republican	1925–1927	Norwalk	
John D. Milne	Republican	1927–1931	Norwalk	
Anson F. Keeler	Republican	1931–1933	Norwalk	Served as Connecticut State Comptroller, and mayor of Norwalk
John D. Milne	Republican	1933–1935	Norwalk	
Charles P. Rumpf	Republican	1935–1939	Darien	
Nehemiah Candee	Republican	1939–1941	Easton	
George L. Warncke	Republican	1941–1943	Wilton	
Stanley P. Mead	Republican	1943–1943	New Canaan	Unexpired term filled by Edward J. Kelley
Edward J. Kelley	Democratic	1943–1945	Norwalk	Special Session Elected to fill unexpired term of S.P. Mead, Served as mayor of Norwalk
Alfred Tweedy	Republican	1945–1947	Darien	
Stanley Stroffolino	Republican	1947–1951	Norwalk	
Tage B. Pearson	Republican	1951–1953	Wilton	Served as a member of the Connecticut House of Representatives, 1948
Louis A. Lemaire	Republican	1953–1957	Norwalk	
Abner W. Sibal	Republican	1957–1961	Norwalk	Served as a member of the United States House of Representatives
Majorie D. Farmer	Republican	1961–1963	Darien	
Robert L. Bliss	Republican	1963–1967	Darien	
John M. Lumpton	Republican	1967–1971	New Canaan	
Edward S. Rimer Jr.	Republican	1971–1973	Norwalk	
George C. Guidera	Republican	1973–1979	Weston	
John G. Matthews	Republican	1979–1987	New Canaan	
Judith Freedman	Republican	1987–2009	Westport	
Toni Boucher	Republican	2009–2019	Wilton	
Will Haskell	Democratic	2019–2023	Westport	
Ceci Maher	Democratic	2023–2027	Wilton	
Sam Nestor	Democratic	2027–	Weston	

== Election results ==
=== 2026 ===
Connecticut's 26th State Senate district election, 2026
Party	Candidate	Votes	%
Democratic	Sam Nestor	28,572	65.4%
Republican	Alma Sarelli	15,114	34.6%
Total votes		43,686	100.00%
Democratic hold			

=== 2024 ===
Connecticut's 26th State Senate district election, 2024
Party	Candidate	Votes	%
Democratic	Ceci Maher	35,713	61.1%
Republican	Kami Evans	22,708	38.9%
Total votes		58,421	100.00%
Democratic hold			

=== 2022 ===
Connecticut's 26th State Senate district election, 2022
Party	Candidate	Votes	%
Democratic	Ceci Maher	25,582	56.87%
Total	Toni Boucher	19,401	43.13%
Republican	Toni Boucher	18,645	41.45%
Independent Party	Toni Boucher	756	1.68%
Total votes		44,983	100.00%
Democratic hold			

=== 2020 ===
Connecticut's 26th State Senate district election, 2020
Party	Candidate	Votes	%
Democratic	Will Haskell (incumbent)	38,581	58.34%
Total	Kim Healy	27,549	41.66%
Republican	Kim Healy	26,095	39.46%
Independent Party	Kim Healy	1,454	2.20%
Total votes		66,130	100.00%
Democratic hold			

=== 2018 ===
Connecticut's 26th State Senate district election, 2018
Party	Candidate	Votes	%
Democratic	Will Haskell	28,159	53.40%
Total	Toni Boucher (incumbent)	24,574	46.60%
Republican	Toni Boucher	23,525	44.61%
Independent Party	Toni Boucher	1,049	1.99%
Total votes		52,733	100.00%
Democratic gain from Republican			

=== 2016 ===
Connecticut's 26th State Senate district election, 2016
Party	Candidate	Votes	%
Republican	Toni Boucher (incumbent)	34,627	60.20%
Democratic	Carolanne Curry	22,898	39.80%
Total votes		57,525	100.00%
Republican hold			

=== 2014 ===
Connecticut's 26th State Senate district election, 2014
Party	Candidate	Votes	%
Republican	Toni Boucher (incumbent)	24,300	64.67%
Total	Philip Sharlach	13,275	35.33%
Democratic	Philip Sharlach	12,617	33.58%
Working Families	Philip Sharlach	658	1.75%
Total votes		37,575	100.00%
Republican hold			

=== 2012 ===
Connecticut's 26th State Senate district election, 2012
Party	Candidate	Votes	%
Republican	Toni Boucher (incumbent)	31,824	58.57%
Total	Carolanne Curry	22,510	41.43%
Democratic	Carolanne Curry	21,673	39.89%
Working Families	Carolanne Curry	837	1.54%
Total votes		54,334	100.00%
Republican hold			

=== 2010 ===
Connecticut's 26th State Senate district election, 2010
Party	Candidate	Votes	%
Republican	Toni Boucher (incumbent)	25,417	60.98%
Democratic	John Hartwell	15,777	37.86%
Working Families	John Hartwel	485	1.16%
Total votes		41,679	100.00%
Republican hold			

=== 2008 ===
Connecticut's 26th State Senate district election, 2008
Party	Candidate	Votes	%
Republican	Toni Boucher	28,704	52.89%
Total	John Hartwell	25,569	47.11%
Democratic	John Hartwell	24,820	45.73%
Working Families	John Hartwell	749	1.38%
Total votes		54,273	100.00%
Republican hold			

=== 2006 ===
Connecticut's 26th State Senate district election, 2006
Party	Candidate	Votes	%
Republican	Judith G. Freedman (incumbent)	21,870	55.60%
Democratic	Craig Rebecca Schiavone	17,467	44.40%
Total votes		39,337	100.00%
Republican hold			

=== 2004 ===
Connecticut's 26th State Senate district election, 2004
Party	Candidate	Votes	%
Republican	Judith G. Freedman (incumbent)	30,665	59.76%
Democratic	Arlo Ellison	20,238	39.44%
Independent Party	William A. Gulya	411	0.80%
Total votes		51,314	100.00%
Republican hold			

=== 2002 ===
Connecticut's 26th State Senate district election, 2002
Party	Candidate	Votes	%
Republican	Judith G. Freedman (incumbent)	23,687	100.00%
Total votes		23,687	100.00%
Republican hold			

=== 2000 ===
Connecticut's 26th State Senate district election, 2000
Party	Candidate	Votes	%
Republican	Judith G. Freedman (incumbent)	32,880	100.00%
Total votes		32,880	100.00%
Republican hold			

=== 1998 ===
Connecticut's 26th State Senate district election, 1998
Party	Candidate	Votes	%
Republican	Judith G. Freedman (incumbent)	22,719	100.00%
Total votes		22,719	100.00%
Republican hold			

=== 1996 ===
Connecticut's 26th State Senate district election, 1996
Party	Candidate	Votes	%
Republican	Judith G. Freedman (incumbent)	32,704	71.45%
Democratic	Charles P. Jenney	13,064	28.55%
Total votes		45,768	100.00%
Republican hold			

=== 1994 ===
Connecticut's 26th State Senate district election, 1994
Party	Candidate	Votes	%
Republican	Judith G. Freedman (incumbent)	25,109	74.97%
Democratic	George F. Lenz	8,383	25.03%
Total votes		33,492	100.00%
Republican hold			

=== 1992 ===
Connecticut's 26th State Senate district election, 1992
Party	Candidate	Votes	%
Republican	Judith G. Freedman (incumbent)	27,607	56.54%
Total	Ann E. Sheffer	21,222	43.46%
Democratic	Ann E. Sheffer	15,639	32.02%
A Connecticut Party	Ann E. Sheffer	5,583	11.44%
Total votes		48,829	100.00%
Republican hold			

=== 1990 ===
Connecticut's 26th State Senate district election, 1990
Party	Candidate	Votes	%
Republican	Judith G. Freedman (incumbent)	26,527	100.00%
Total votes		26,527	100.00%
Republican hold			

=== 1988 ===
Connecticut's 26th State Senate district election, 1988
Party	Candidate	Votes	%
Republican	Judith G. Freedman (incumbent)	34,877	74.88%
Democratic	George F. Lenz	11,705	25.12%
Total votes		46,582	100.00%
Republican hold			

=== 1986 ===
Connecticut's 26th State Senate district election, 1986
Party	Candidate	Votes	%
Republican	Judith G. Freedman	20,843	68.06%
Democratic	Louis R. Dorsey Sr.	9,779	31.94%
Total votes		30,622	100.00%
Republican hold			

=== 1984 ===
Connecticut's 26th State Senate district election, 1984
Party	Candidate	Votes	%
Republican	John G. Matthews (incumbent)	34,950	71.31%
Democratic	Adam J. Freeman	14,057	28.69%
Total votes		49,007	100.00%
Republican hold			

=== 1982 ===
Connecticut's 26th State Senate district election, 1982
Party	Candidate	Votes	%
Republican	John G. Matthews (incumbent)	21,924	67.40%
Democratic	Eugene E. Cederbaum	10,602	32.60%
Total votes		32,526	100.00%
Republican hold			

=== 1980 ===
Connecticut's 26th State Senate district election, 1980
Party	Candidate	Votes	%
Republican	John G. Matthews (incumbent)	32,498	73.32%
Democratic	Richard H. Saxl	11,826	26.68%
Total votes		44,324	100.00%
Republican hold			

=== 1978 ===
Connecticut's 26th State Senate district election, 1978
Party	Candidate	Votes	%
Republican	John G. Matthews	21,039	68.05%
Democratic	James L. Eldridge	9,876	31.95%
Total votes		30,915	100.00%
Republican hold			

=== 1976 ===
Connecticut's 26th State Senate district election, 1976
Party	Candidate	Votes	%
Republican	George C. Guidera (incumbent)	33,566	73.65%
Democratic	Gregory L. Collins	12,008	26.35%
Total votes		45,574	100.00%
Republican hold			

=== 1974 ===
Connecticut's 26th State Senate district election, 1974
Party	Candidate	Votes	%
Republican	George C. Guidera (incumbent)	21,981	66.51%
Democratic	Stephen B. Heintz	11,065	33.49%
Total votes		33,046	100.00%
Republican hold			

=== 1972 ===
Connecticut's 26th State Senate district election, 1972
Party	Candidate	Votes	%
Republican	George C. Guidera	30,765	68.51%
Democratic	J. Myron Johnson	14,143	31.49%
Total votes		44,908	100.00%
Republican hold			

=== 1970 ===
Connecticut's 26th State Senate district election, 1970
Party	Candidate	Votes	%
Republican	Edward S. Rimer Jr.	22,683	69.51%
Democratic	Noel J. Aderer	9,950	30.49%
Total votes		32,633	100.00%
Republican hold			

=== 1968 ===
Connecticut's 26th State Senate district election, 1968
Party	Candidate	Votes	%
Republican	John M. Lumpton (incumbent)	25,005	64.00%
Democratic	Charles L. Burlwell	14,065	36.00%
Total votes		39,070	100.00%
Republican hold			

=== 1966 ===
Connecticut's 26th State Senate district election, 1966
Party	Candidate	Votes	%
Republican	John M. Lumpton	19,202	67.78%
Democratic	Alexander P. Aderer	9,130	32.22%
Total votes		28,332	100.00%
Republican hold			

=== 1962 ===
Connecticut's 26th State Senate district election, 1962
Party	Candidate	Votes	%
Republican	Robert L. Bliss	25,190	60.41%
Democratic	Victor Knauth	16,509	39.59%
Total votes		41,699	100.00%
Republican hold			

=== 1960 ===
Connecticut's 26th State Senate district election, 1960
Party	Candidate	Votes	%
Republican	Majorie D. Farmer	32,220	62.28%
Democratic	Norman P. Seagrave	19,517	37.72%
Total votes		51,737	100.00%
Republican hold			

=== 1958 ===
Connecticut's 26th State Senate district election, 1958
Party	Candidate	Votes	%
Republican	Abner W. Sibal (incumbent)	21,629	58.60%
Democratic	Edward J. Kelley	15,286	41.40%
Total votes		36,915	100.00%
Republican hold			

=== 1956 ===
Connecticut's 26th State Senate district election, 1956
Party	Candidate	Votes	%
Republican	Abner W. Sibal	34,992	75.01%
Democratic	Robert A. Slavitt	11,653	24.99%
Total votes		46,645	100.00%
Republican hold			

=== 1954 ===
Connecticut's 26th State Senate district election, 1954
Party	Candidate	Votes	%
Republican	Louis A. Lemaire (incumbent)	22,016	65.22%
Democratic	Helen R. Baker	11,738	34.78%
Total votes		33,754	100.00%
Republican hold			

=== 1952 ===
Connecticut's 26th State Senate district election, 1952
Party	Candidate	Votes	%
Republican	Louis A. Lemaire	28,587	66.67%
Democratic	John J. Dolan	14,195	33.11%
Socialist	Richard W. Underhill	96	0.22%
Total votes		42,878	100.00%
Republican hold			

=== 1950 ===
Connecticut's 26th State Senate district election, 1950
Party	Candidate	Votes	%
Republican	Tage B. Pearson	19,305	59.87%
Democratic	John J. Marr	11,757	36.46%
Republican	John A. Hansen	1,182	3.67%
Total votes		32,244	100.00%
Republican hold			

=== 1948 ===
Connecticut's 26th State Senate district election, 1948
Party	Candidate	Votes	%
Republican	Stanley Stroffolino (incumbent)	19,922	56.68%
Democratic	Hoyt Catlin	13,271	37.76%
Socialist	Irving C. Freese	1,536	4.37%
People's	James Martin	419	1.19%
Total votes		35,148	100.00%
Republican hold			

=== 1946 ===
Connecticut's 26th State Senate district election, 1946
Party	Candidate	Votes	%
Republican	Stanley Stroffolino	15,582	60.58%
Democratic	Llewellyn G. Ross	7,465	29.02%
Socialist	Christian Hansen	2,677	10.40%
Total votes		25,724	100.00%
Republican hold			

=== 1944 ===
Connecticut's 26th State Senate district election, November 7, 1944
Party	Candidate	Votes	%
Republican	Alfred Tweedy	18,370	58.81%
Democratic	Thomas H. Dickinson	12,662	40.53%
Socialist	Christian Hansen	207	0.66%
Total votes		31,239	100.00%
Republican gain from Democratic			

=== 1944 (special) ===
Connecticut's 26th State Senate district special election, January 17, 1944
Party	Candidate	Votes	%
Democratic	Edward J. Kelley	3,449	52.72%
Republican	William J. Lyons	2,972	45.43%
Socialist	Christian Hansen	121	1.85%
Total votes		6,542	100.00%
Democratic gain from Republican			

=== 1942 ===
Connecticut's 26th State Senate district election, 1942
Party	Candidate	Votes	%
Republican	Stanley P. Mead	12,004	51.03%
Democratic	George R. Stevens Jr.	10,440	44.39%
Socialist	Christian Hansen	1,076	4.58%
Total votes		23,520	100.00%
Republican hold			

=== 1940 ===
Connecticut's 26th State Senate district election, 1940
Party	Candidate	Votes	%
Republican	George L. Warncke	17,158	57.68%
Total	James T. Powers	12,395	41.65%
Democratic	James T. Powers	12,331	41.44%
Union	James T. Powers	64	0.21%
Socialist	Christian Hansen	198	0.66%
Write-in		1	0.01%
Total votes		29,752	100.00%
Republican hold			

=== 1938 ===
Connecticut's 26th State Senate district election, 1938
Party	Candidate	Votes	%
Republican	Nehemiah Candee	11,644	52.74%
Total	James T. Powers	7,871	35.64%
Democratic	James T. Powers	7,756	35.12%
Union	James T. Powers	115	0.52%
Socialist	Christian Hansen	2,564	11.62%
Total votes		22,079	100.00%
Republican hold			

=== 1936 ===
Connecticut's 26th State Senate district election, 1936
Party	Candidate	Votes	%
Republican	Charles P. Rumpf (incumbent)	12,238	51.48%
Democratic	Conrad F. Wagner	11,534	48.52%
Total votes		23,772	100.00%
Republican hold			

=== 1934 ===
Connecticut's 26th State Senate district election, 1934
Party	Candidate	Votes	%
Republican	Charles P. Rumpf	9,243	52.60%
Democratic	Thomas H. Canty	6,975	39.69%
Socialist	John Saxton	1,196	6.81%
Independent Citizens	Henry A. Thayer	159	0.90%
Total votes		17,573	100.00%
Republican hold			

=== 1932 ===
Connecticut's 26th State Senate district election, 1932
Party	Candidate	Votes	%
Republican	John D. Milne	11,247	55.55%
Democratic	Charles Swartz	8,368	41.33%
Socialist	Stanley D. Fisher	594	2.94%
Communist	Laracca	35	0.18%
Total votes		20,244	100.00%
Republican hold			

=== 1930 ===
Connecticut's 26th State Senate district election, 1930
Party	Candidate	Votes	%
Republican	Anson F. Keeler	6,856	52.40%
Democratic	John T. Dwyer	6,228	47.60%
Total votes		13,084	100.00%
Republican hold			

=== 1928 ===
Connecticut's 26th State Senate district election, 1928
Party	Candidate	Votes	%
Republican	John D. Milne (incumbent)	11,210	63.14%
Democratic	Henry Kelley	6,542	36.86%
Total votes		17,752	100.00%
Republican hold			

=== 1926 ===
Connecticut's 26th State Senate district election, 1926
Party	Candidate	Votes	%
Republican	John D. Milne	5,659	75.42%
Democratic	Henry J. Klein	1,844	24.58%
Total votes		7,503	100.00%
Republican hold			

=== 1924 ===
Connecticut's 26th State Senate district election, 1924
Party	Candidate	Votes	%
Republican	Frank W. Gregory	8,316	74.97%
Democratic	William K.J. Hubell	2,777	25.03%
Total votes		11,093	100.00%
Republican hold			

=== 1922 ===
Connecticut's 26th State Senate district election, 1922
Party	Candidate	Votes	%
Republican	John H. Behre	4,359	56.76%
Democratic	William K.J. Hubell	3,321	43.24%
Total votes		7,680	100.00%
Republican hold			

=== 1920 ===
Connecticut's 26th State Senate district election, 1920
Party	Candidate	Votes	%
Republican	Nehemiah Candee	6,935	68.89%
Democratic	Quinlan	3,132	31.11%
Total votes		10,067	100.00%
Republican hold			

=== 1918 ===
Connecticut's 26th State Senate district election, 1918
Party	Candidate	Votes	%
Republican	Charles E. Williamson (incumbent)	2,544	56.53%
Total	Swartz	1,957	43.47%
Democratic	Swartz	1,953	43.39%
Citizens	Swartz	4	0.08%
Total votes		4,501	100.00%
Republican hold			

=== 1916 ===
Connecticut's 26th State Senate district election, 1916
Party	Candidate	Votes	%
Republican	Charles E. Williamson	3,862	59.69%
Democratic	Vollmer	2,570	39.73%
Prohibition	E. Bedient	38	0.58%
Total votes		6,470	100.00%
Republican hold			

=== 1914 ===
Connecticut's 26th State Senate district election, 1914
Party	Candidate	Votes	%
Republican	Hubert E. Bishop	2,902	50.06%
Democratic	Hanford S. Weed (incumbent)	2,666	46.00%
Progressive	Richardson	163	2.82%
Prohibition	E. Bedient	37	0.64%
Socialist	Cullen	28	0.48%
Total votes		5,796	100.00%
Republican gain from Democratic			

=== 1912 ===
Connecticut's 26th State Senate district election, 1912
Party	Candidate	Votes	%
Democratic	Hanford S. Weed	2,491	42.65%
Republican	Mead	2,145	36.73%
Progressive	Pentecost	1,143	19.58%
Prohibition	Fancher	61	1.04%
Total votes		5,840	100.00%
Democratic hold			

=== 1910 ===
Connecticut's 26th State Senate district election, 1910
Party	Candidate	Votes	%
Democratic	Jeremiah Donovan	2,780	54.69%
Republican	Quintard	2,179	42.87%
Socialist	LaMonte	74	1.46%
Prohibition	Mills	49	0.97%
Write-in		1	0.01%
Total votes		5,083	100.00%
Democratic gain from Republican			

=== 1908 ===
Connecticut's 26th State Senate district election, 1908
Party	Candidate	Votes	%
Republican	Joseph F. Silliman	2,983	51.37%
Democratic	Jeremiah Donovan (incumbent)	2,774	47.77%
Prohibition	Benedict	47	0.81%
Write-in		3	0.05%
Total votes		5,807	100.00%
Republican gain from Democratic			

=== 1906 ===
Connecticut's 26th State Senate district election, 1906
Party	Candidate	Votes	%
Democratic	Jeremiah Donovan (incumbent)	2,661	55.55%
Republican	Osborn	2,088	43.59%
Prohibition	Harris	38	0.80%
Write-in		3	0.06%
Total votes		4,790	100.00%
Democratic hold			

=== 1904 ===
Connecticut's 26th State Senate district election, 1904
Party	Candidate	Votes	%
Democratic	Jeremiah Donovan	2,896	50.46%
Republican	Taylor	2,796	48.71%
Prohibition	Bedient	45	0.78%
Write-in		3	0.05%
Total votes		5,740	100.00%
Democratic win (new seat)			

== See also ==
- Connecticut's 12th Senate district
- Connecticut's 25th Senate district
- History of Norwalk, Connecticut
- History of Wilton, Connecticut
- List of mayors of Norwalk, Connecticut
