= Senator Boucher =

Senator Boucher may refer to:

- Rick Boucher (born 1946), Virginia State Senate
- Toni Boucher (born 1949), Connecticut State Senate
