= Connecticut's 31st State Senate district =

American legislative district

Senator
Henri Martin; R

Connecticut's 31st State Senate district elects one member of the Connecticut State Senate. It consists of the communities of Bristol, Plainville, Plymouth, Thomaston, and part of Harwinton. It has been represented by Republican Henri Martin since 2015.

== Recent elections ==
=== 2020 ===
2020 Connecticut State Senate election, District 31
Party	Candidate	Votes	%
Democratic	Mary Fortier	21,589	41.90
Republican	Henri Martin (incumbent)	29,884	58.10
Total votes		51,473	100.00
Republican hold			

=== 2018 ===
2018 Connecticut State Senate election, District 31
Party	Candidate	Votes	%
Total	Henri Martin (incumbent)	22,367	58.7
Republican	Henri Martin	21,317	55.9
Independent	Henri Martin	1,050	2.8
Democratic	Christopher Wright	15,762	41.3
Total votes		38,129	100.0
Republican hold			

=== 2016 ===
2016 Connecticut State Senate election, District 31
Party	Candidate	Votes	%
Democratic	Michael Nicastro	18,053	39.93
Republican	Henri Martin (incumbent)	27,162	60.07
Total votes		45,215	100.00
Republican hold			

=== 2014 ===
2014 Connecticut State Senate election, District 31
Party	Candidate	Votes	%
Republican	Henri Martin	48.8	55.9
Independent	Henri Martin	1,149	3.7
Democratic	Robert Michalik	13,773	43.9
Working Families	Robert Michalik	1,150	3.7
Total votes		31,390	100.0
Republican hold			

=== 2012 ===
2012 Connecticut State Senate election, District 31
Party	Candidate	Votes	%
Republican	Jason C. Welch (incumbent)	20,506	51.1
Democratic	Dave Roche	19,633	48.9
Total votes		45,215	100.00
Republican hold			
