= Sam Nestor =

American politician

Member-elect of the Connecticut State Senate from the 26th district
- Assuming office January 2027
- Succeeding: Ceci Maher

Personal details
- Party: Democratic
- Spouse: Mike Nestor
- Children: 2
- Education: Cornell University; The Campaign School at Yale

Sam Nestor is an American politician and public servant. A member of the Democratic Party, she is the member-elect for the 26th district of the Connecticut State Senate.

== Personal life ==
She is married to Mike Nestor. They have two children and reside in Weston, Connecticut.
