= Alfred Tweedy =

American politician (1880–1967)

Member of the Connecticut Senate from the 26th district
- In office 1945–1947
- Preceded by: Edward J. Kelley
- Succeeded by: Stanley Stroffolino

Personal details
- Born: February 24, 1880 Milwaukee, Wisconsin, U.S.
- Died: November 2, 1967 (aged 87) Clearwater, Florida, U.S.
- Party: Republican

Alfred Tweedy (February 24, 1880 – November 2, 1967) was a member of the Connecticut Senate from the 26th district.

== Biography ==
Tweedy was born on February 24, 1880, in Milwaukee, Wisconsin. He would become a lawyer.

== Political career ==
Tweedy was a member of the Senate in 1945. Previously, he was a probate court judge. He was a Republican.

== Death ==
Tweedy died on November 2, 1967, in Clearwater, Florida. He was 87.
