= Connecticut's 4th State Senate district =

American legislative district

Senator
MD Rahman; D

Connecticut's 4th State Senate district elects one member of the Connecticut State Senate. It consists of the towns of Andover, Bolton, Glastonbury, and Manchester. It has been represented by MD Rahman since 2023.

== Recent elections ==
=== 2020 ===
2020 Connecticut State Senate election, District 4
Party	Candidate	Votes	%
Democratic	Steve Cassano (incumbent)	30,484	56.34
Republican	Matthew M. Corey	20,737	38.33
Working Families	Steve Cassano (incumbent)	1,230	2.27
Libertarian	Harold S. Harris	830	1.53
Reclaim Party	Kelly Green	823	1.52
Total votes		54,104	100.00
Democratic hold			

=== 2018 ===
2018 Connecticut State Senate election, District 4
Party	Candidate	Votes	%
Total	Steve Cassano (incumbent)	23,257	54.2
Democratic	Steve Cassano	22,303	52.0
Working Families	Steve Cassano	954	2.2
Total	Mark Tweedie	19,632	45.8
Republican	Mark Tweedie	18,612	43.4
Independent	Mark Tweedie	1,020	2.4
Total votes		42,889	100.0
Democratic hold			

=== 2016 ===
2016 Connecticut State Senate election, District 4
Party	Candidate	Votes	%
Democratic	Steve Cassano (incumbent)	24,146	50.62
Republican	Lorraine Marchetti	23,557	49.38
Total votes		47,703	100.0
Democratic hold			

=== 2014 ===
2014 Connecticut State Senate election, District 4
Party	Candidate	Votes	%
Total	Steve Cassano (incumbent)	17,665	52.1
Democratic	Steve Cassano	16,567	48.9
Working Families	Steve Cassano	1,098	3.2
Total	Whit Osgood	16,229	47.9
Republican	Whit Osgood	15,181	44.8
Independent	Mark Tweedie	1,048	3.1
Total votes		33,894	100.0
Democratic hold			

=== 2012 ===
2016 Connecticut State Senate election, District 4
Party	Candidate	Votes	%
Democratic	Steve Cassano (incumbent)	24,930	56.5
Republican	Lorraine Marchetti	19,184	43.5
Total votes		44,114	100.0
Democratic hold			
