= MD Rahman =

American politician

Member of the Connecticut State Senate from the 4th district
- Incumbent
- Assumed office 2023
- Preceded by: Steve Cassano (D)

Personal details
- Party: Democratic
- Spouse: Yelena Rahman

MD Masudur Rahman is an American politician from the town of Manchester in the state of Connecticut. He is the State Senator for Connecticut's 4th State Senate district, covering the towns of Andover, Glastonbury, Manchester, and Bolton. As of 2023, he serves as Chair of the Planning and Development Committee of the Connecticut State Senate. He is a member of the Democratic Party. He was also endorsed by the Working Families Party during his 2022 campaign. He is currently serving his first term, and was elected in November 2022.

Rahman is an immigrant to the United States, having been born in Bangladesh. Prior to running for the Connecticut State Senate, he worked as an entrepreneur and built multiple successful businesses in Connecticut. He is married and has three children.
