= Edward J. Kelley =

American politician (1883–1960)

25th Mayor of Norwalk, Connecticut
- In office 1945–1947
- Preceded by: Robert B. Oliver
- Succeeded by: Irving Freese

Member of the Connecticut Senate from the 26th district
- In office 1943–1945
- Preceded by: Stanley P. Mead
- Succeeded by: Alfred Tweedy

Personal details
- Born: 1883
- Died: May 13, 1960 (aged 77) Norwalk, Connecticut, U.S.
- Party: Democratic

Edward J. Kelley (1883 – May 13, 1960) was a one-term Democratic mayor of Norwalk, Connecticut from 1945 to 1947. He defeated Republican Ray Werme and Socialist Irving Freese. Kelley had previously been president of the Norwalk Common Council. He served in the Connecticut Senate from 1943 to 1945, filling the unexpired term of Stanley P. Mead.

He was the son of Henry Kelley Sr. of New Canaan, Connecticut.

Preceded by Stanley P. Mead	Member of the Connecticut Senate from the 26th District; 1943–1945	Succeeded by Alfred Tweedy
Preceded by Robert B. Oliver	Mayor of Norwalk, Connecticut; 1945–1947	Succeeded by Irving Freese
