= Ceci Maher =

American politician (born 1953)

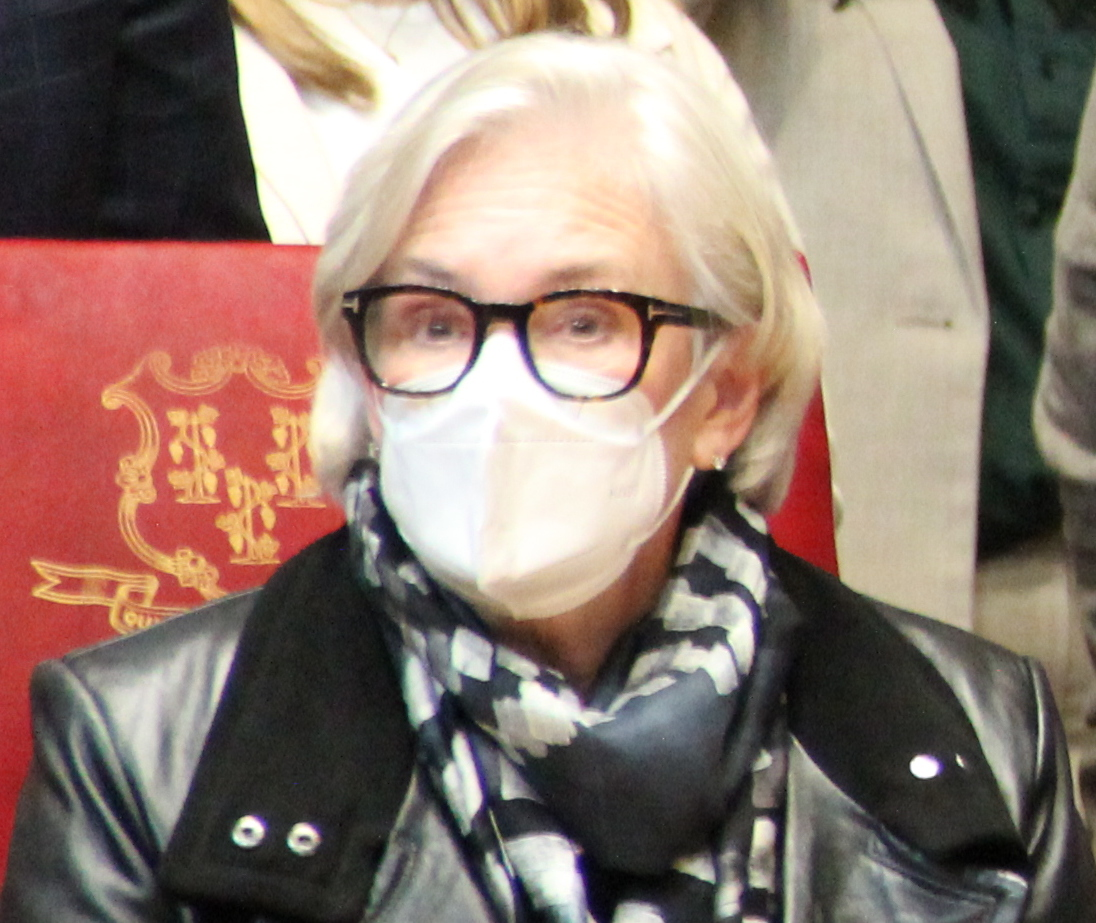
- Maher in 2023

Member of the Connecticut State Senate from the 26th district
- Incumbent
- Assumed office January 4, 2023
- Preceded by: Will Haskell
- Succeeded by: Sam Nestor (elect)

Personal details
- Born: Catherine Cecilia Queeney; November 19, 1953 (age 72)
- Party: Democratic
- Spouse: Gordon Roberts Maher (m. 1980; died 2020)
- Children: 3, including Katherine
- Education: University of Massachusetts Amherst (BS); Columbia University (MS)
- Website: cecimaher.com

Catherine Cecilia Maher (née Queeney; born November 19, 1953) is an American executive and politician. She currently serves as a member of the Connecticut State Senate, representing District 26, which encompasses Darien, New Canaan, Redding, Ridgefield, Stamford, Weston, Westport and Wilton. She is a member of the Democratic Party.

== Early life and education ==
Maher was born Catherine Cecilia Queeney to John Hart Queeney and Rosalie (née Kirby) Queeney. She was one of six children and was raised primarily in Stamford, Connecticut, where she attended the local schools. She completed a Bachelor of Science in fashion merchandising at University of Massachusetts Amherst. In 1995, Maher completed a Master of Social Work at Columbia University in New York.

== Career ==
Maher started her career at the department store Lord & Taylor in 1977 and worked for several years for department stores such as Target Corporation. She later became an executive at various non-profit organizations in Connecticut, such as Sandy Hook Promise.

== Politics ==
In 2019, Maher unsuccessfully ran for the board of selectmen of Wilton, Connecticut. In 2022, she was endorsed by the Democratic Party for the Connecticut State Senate. She was elected in the primary election on November 8, 2022, succeeding incumbent Will Haskell. She assumed office on January 4, 2023, and currently serves as chair of the Children's committee and vice chair of the Higher Education & Employment Advancement committee. She is also a member of Energy & Technology, Human Services, Internship and Judiciary committees.

In March 2026, Maher announced her plans to retire from politics, stating that "[her] generation has a responsibility to mentor and support younger leaders."

== Personal life ==
Maher married Gordon Roberts Maher, a Goldman Sachs banking executive, on September 7, 1980. He died on October 5, 2020. Maher has three grown children, including Katherine Maher, and resides in Wilton, Connecticut.
