= Henri Martin (American politician) =

American politician

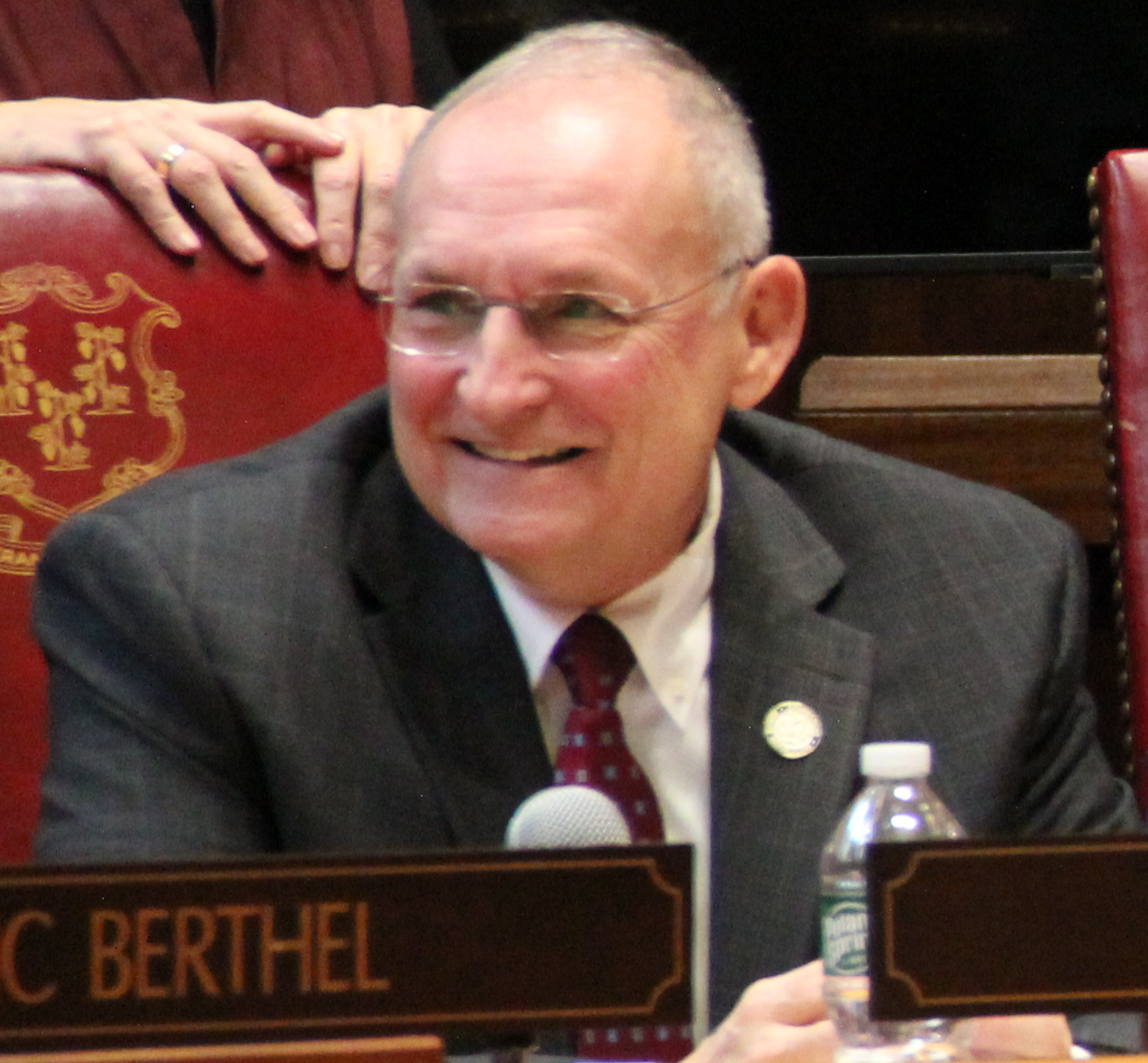
- Martin in 2023

Member of the Connecticut State Senate from the 31st district
- Incumbent
- Assumed office January 12, 2015
- Preceded by: Jason Welch
- Constituency: represents Bristol, Harwinton (part), Plainville (part), Plymouth, and Thomaston

Personal details
- Party: Republican

Henri Martin is a Republican member of the Connecticut State Senate. First elected to the Senate in 2014, he has represented Connecticut's 31st State Senate district since 2015.

== Education and business career ==
Martin graduated from Bristol Central High School in 1974 and received a bachelor's degree in criminal justice from Saint Anselm College in 1978. He is a real estate broker. He owns Henri Martin Real Estate and Broad Street Self Storage.

== Political career ==
From 2011 to 2013, Martin was a member of the Bristol City Council.

=== State Senate elections ===
He won election to the Senate seat for the 31st district in 2014, in the open seat being vacated by Republican Jason Welch, who decided not to run for reelection. Martin defeated Democratic nominee Robert Michalik, the town attorney for Plainville. In addition to Bristol and Plainville, the 31st district includes Harwinton, Plymouth, and Thomaston. The legislature's addition of Thomaston to the 31st district in 2012 (during the redistricting process) gave the district more Republican-leaning voters, helping Martin to prevail in 2014. In the 2016 election, Martin defeated Democratic nominee Michael Nicastro, who previously led the Central Connecticut Chamber of Commerce. Martin was reelected in the 2018 election, defeating Democratic nominee Christopher Wright, a former state representative. Martin won reelection in the 2020 election, defeating Bristol City Councilwoman Mary Fortier, the Democratic candidate. In 2022, Martin won a fifth term, defeating Democratic nominee Greg Hahn, a Bristol city councilman.

=== Tenure ===
Martin opposes legalization of marijuana in Connecticut, and has been an outspoken opponent of proposals to introduce highway tolls in the state.

In 2017, Martin voted in favor of a gambling expansion bill to allow the Mashantucket Pequot and Mohegan tribes to develop a casino in East Windsor. In 2020, Martin opposed Governor Ned Lamont's proposal to join the Transportation and Climate Initiative to reduce carbon emissions; like other Republicans, Martin arguing that the proposal would increase energy prices. In 2022, Martin voted against an abortion safe-harbor bill.

Martin was one of two ranking Republican members of the Transportation Committee in 2019, and in 2023 he was the ranking Republican member of the Finance Revenue and Bonding Committee (which considers tax measures in Connecticut). He is also a member of the State Bond Commission; in that role, he has criticized the Connecticut Port Authority over its oversight of a long-troubled project to redevelop the New London-based State Pier.
