= Toni Boucher =

American politician (born 1949)

Member of the Connecticut House of Representatives from the 143rd district
- In office January 1997 – January 2009
- Preceded by: Stuart Smith
- Succeeded by: Peggy Reeves

Member of the Connecticut Senate from the 26th district
- In office January 7, 2009 – January 7, 2019
- Preceded by: Judith Freedman
- Succeeded by: Will Haskell

Personal details
- Born: Antonietta Iannuzzi; December 4, 1949 (age 76) Italy
- Party: Republican
- Education: American University; University of San Diego (B.A.); University of Connecticut School of Business (MBA)

Antonietta "Toni" Boucher (née Iannuzzi; born December 4, 1949) is an American politician from Connecticut. A Republican, Boucher served in the Connecticut House of Representatives from 1997 to 2009, representing the 143rd district, and in the Connecticut State Senate from 2009 to 2019, representing the 26th district.

In November 2023, Boucher was elected as First Selectwoman of Wilton, Connecticut, succeeding First Selectwoman Lynn Vanderslice.

== Early life and education ==
Boucher was born Antonietta Iannuzzi on December 4, 1949, in Italy. When she was five, she and her family immigrated to Naugatuck, Connecticut. She is a Roman Catholic.

Boucher attended American University, the University of San Diego, where she earned a bachelor's degree, and the University of Connecticut School of Business, where she earned a Master of Business Administration.

== Political career ==
Toni Boucher served as a member of the Connecticut State Board of Education, where she chaired the state's policy and long-range planning committees.

Boucher served on the Wilton Board of Selectmen and the town of Wilton's Council on Public Facilities and Insurance Committees. She has previously served on the advisory boards of the New Canaan Nature Center and the non-governmental organization New Canaan Cares. She was also active in the Connecticut Conference of Municipalities, the Wilton League of Women Voters, and the Wilton Historical Society.

From 1986 to 1994, she also served on the Wilton Board of Education, during which time she served as both the board's chair and secretary. She also served on the board of directors of the Wilton Education Foundation. She was active in the Connecticut Association of Boards of Education and the National Association of State Boards of Education. Early in her career, she worked as a translator and secondary education language teacher.

From 1996 to 2008, Boucher served six terms in the Connecticut House of Representatives. She was first elected to the Connecticut House of Representatives in November 1996 from the 143rd district, which included the eastern portion of Norwalk and most of Wilton. The district also previously included New Canaan.

In the 2002 election, Boucher lost approximately 200 uncounted votes when a mechanical voting machine broke down.

Toni Boucher defeated Democrat Paul Burnham in the 2004 election, taking 61% of the votes.

In the 2008 election, Toni Boucher won the senatorial 26th district seat following her six terms in Connecticut House of Representatives.

In 2013, Boucher addressed the United Nations regarding Senate resolutions on Tibet.

Toni Boucher won in the 2014 election over Democrat Phil Sharlach.

Toni Boucher serves as a deputy minority leader of the state senate. She is a ranking member of the state legislature's Education Committee and Higher Education Committee. She also served on the General Assembly's Finance, Revenue & Bonding Committee, where she was a ranking member of the subcommittee for Transportation Bonding.

On June 1, 2017, Boucher announced that she was exploring a run for governor. After exploring the possibility for more than 10 months, Boucher made the "not easy" decision to withdraw from the race. This was the second time she unsuccessfully "explored" running for governor only to withdraw; she made the same decision in 2014. Boucher claimed that her decision to run for re-election to the senate was motivated by the possibility that "We … could actually take over the state Senate in a big way." On November 6, 2018, however, she was defeated by the 22-year-old, first-time candidate, Will Haskell, one of several Democrats who helped solidify a majority control of both houses of the legislature.

== Political positions ==
In 2003, Boucher supported mass transit improvements. Boucher has continued to work on transportation-related issues, supporting the need to replenish the Highway Trust Fund.

In 2010, Toni Boucher promoted a new law in Connecticut that would allow pet owners to leave a trust to their pets in order to care for the animals in case of their owner's death.

Toni Boucher is a critic of marijuana law reform. She served as a director for Human Services Council.

She has been critical of the state's education record and recommended removing state education mandates and rewarding advanced students with scholarships. She has also been critical of Governor Dannel Malloy's vetoes of education-related bills, one of which would have required applicants for state commissioner of education to have education-related experience and higher-learning degrees.

Preceded by Stuart Smith	Member of the Connecticut House of Representatives from the 143rd District; January 1997 – January 2009	Succeeded by Peggy Reeves
Preceded by Judith Freedman	Member of the Connecticut Senate from the 26th District; 2009 – 2019	Succeeded by Will Haskell
