= Heather Somers =

American politician (born 1966)

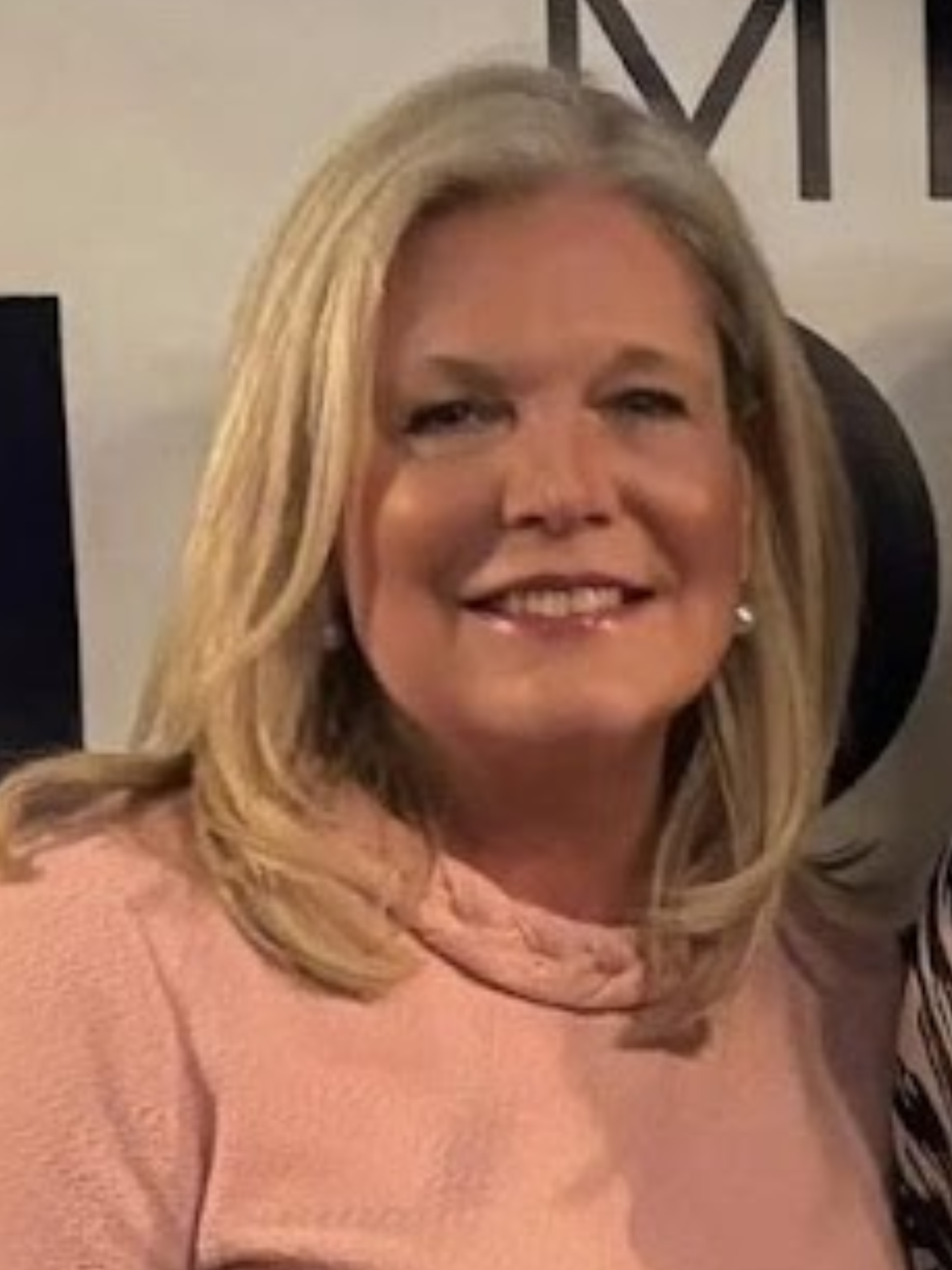

Member of the Connecticut State Senate from the 18th district
- Incumbent
- Assumed office January 4, 2017
- Preceded by: Andrew M. Maynard

Mayor of Groton
- In office 2012–2014
- Preceded by: Harry Watson
- Succeeded by: Rita Schmidt

Personal details
- Born: April 22, 1966 (age 60) Groton, Connecticut, U.S.
- Party: Republican
- Education: University of Connecticut (BA)

Heather Bond Somers (born April 22, 1966) is an American politician who has served in the Connecticut State Senate from the 18th District since 2017. She previously served as Mayor of Groton from 2012 to 2014. She also served on the Groton Town Council from 2008 to 2018.

== Electoral history ==
=== 2024 ===
2024 Connecticut State Senate Election, District 18
Party	Candidate	Votes	%	±%
Republican	Heather Somers	27,461	55.7	+1.5
Independent	Heather Somers	1,663	3.4	+1.3
Total	Heather Somers (Incumbent)	29,124	59.1
Democratic	Andrew M. Parrella	20,217	41.0	-1.0
Majority		8,907	18.0	5.4
Turnout		49,341	100.0	—
Republican hold

=== 2022 ===
2022 Connecticut State Senate Election, District 18
Party	Candidate	Votes	%	±%
Republican	Heather Somers (Incumbent)	20,152	54.22	+1.82
Democratic	Farouk Rajab	15,617	42.0	-2.5
Independent	Heather Somers (Incumbent)	763	2.1	+0.3
Working Families	Farouk Rajab	632	1.7	+0.3
Majority		4,666	12.6	7.8
Turnout		37,164	100.0	—
Republican hold		Swing	+5.9	—

=== 2020 ===
Heather Somers won re-election to a third term after defeating Democratic challenger Bob Statchen.

2020 Connecticut State Senate election, District 18
Party	Candidate	Votes	%
Democratic	Bob Statchen	23,942	47.60
Republican	Heather Somers (incumbent)	26,377	52.42
Independent Party	Bob Statchen	883	1.75
Working Families	Bob Statchen	677	1.35
Total votes		50,319	100.00
Republican hold			

=== 2018 ===
Heather Somers won re-election to a 2nd term after defeating Democratic challenger Robert Statchen.

2018 Connecticut State Senate election, District 18
Party	Candidate	Votes	%
Total	Heather Somers (incumbent)	20,887	54.7
Republican	Heather Somers	19,584	51.3
Independent	Heather Somers	1,303	3.4
Total	Robert Statchen	17,276	45.3
Democratic	Robert Statchen	16,502	43.2
Working Families	Robert Statchen	774	2.0
Total votes		38,163	100.0
Republican hold			

Party political offices
Preceded by Mark Boughton	Republican nominee for Lieutenant Governor of Connecticut; 2014	Succeeded by Joe Markley
