= Dan Champagne =

Connecticut politician

Member of the Connecticut State Senate from the 35th district
- In office January 9, 2019 – January 4, 2023
- Preceded by: Tony Guglielmo
- Succeeded by: Jeff Gordon
- Constituency: Ashford, Chaplin, Coventry, Eastford, Ellington (part), Hampton, Pomfret, Stafford, Tolland, Union, Vernon, Willington, Woodstock.

Mayor of Vernon, Connecticut
- Incumbent
- Assumed office 2013
- Preceded by: George F. Apel

Personal details
- Party: Republican
- Website: ctsenaterepublicans.com/home-champagne/

Dan Champagne is an American politician who served as a Connecticut State senator representing the 35th District, which encompasses various towns in Northeastern Connecticut. Champagne was first elected in 2018 and is a member of the Republican Party. Champagne also serves as mayor of Vernon, Connecticut.

== Political career ==
Champagne ran for the 35th District seat in 2018 in order to replace the retiring Anthony Guglielmo. Champagne would later win the election in a thin two point margin over Democratic challenger John Perrier. Champagne was re-elected in 2020 by an even thinner one point margin over Democrat Lisa Thomas. Champagne has been assigned to committees such as the Judiciary and the Planning and Development Committee. Champagne is also the current Ranking Member of the Public Safety and Security Committee. While in the Senate, Champagne has opposed bills legalizing marijuana in the state of Connecticut.
