= Will Haskell =

American politician (born 1996)

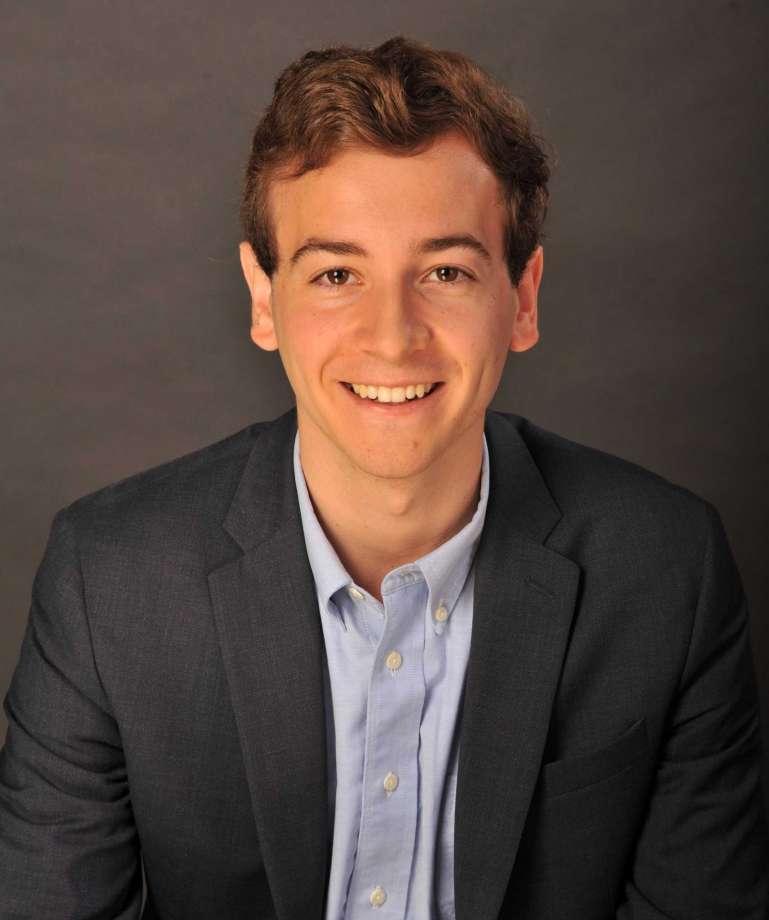

Member of the Connecticut State Senate from the 26th district
- In office January 9, 2019 – January 4, 2023
- Preceded by: Toni Boucher
- Succeeded by: Ceci Maher

Personal details
- Born: June 28, 1996 (age 30) Westport, Connecticut, U.S.
- Party: Democratic
- Spouse: Katie Cion (m. 2023)
- Education: Georgetown University (BA); New York University (JD)
- Website: Campaign website Connecticut Senate website

William Haskell (born June 28, 1996) is an American politician and a former member of the Connecticut State Senate, representing District 26 from 2019 to 2023. The district includes the towns of Redding, Ridgefield, Wilton, and parts of Bethel, Weston, Westport, and New Canaan. Haskell is a member of the Democratic Party, and was a member of the State Senate Democratic Caucus. When Haskell originally won election to the 26th District, he became the first Democrat to represent the district in over 50 years.

== Education ==
Haskell attended school in the Westport Public School System and graduated from Staples High School in 2014, where he was an active member of Staples Players, the student theater group. He attended Georgetown University majoring in Government and minoring in Journalism. He graduated Phi Beta Kappa in May 2018, shortly after launching his campaign in March of that same year. He hired his college roommate as his campaign manager. He planned attending law school in New York City following the conclusion of his state senate term in 2023. In 2023, he attended the New York University School of Law and graduated in May 2025. He is the youngest of four brothers.

== Career ==
Will Haskell ran for and won the 26th district in 2018 as a first-time candidate, beating incumbent Republican Toni Boucher who had held the state senate seat since 2009. His campaign received endorsements from Congressman Jim Himes, Senator Chris Murphy of Connecticut, and former president Barack Obama. Haskell wrote a book about his 2018 election, entitled 100,000 First Bosses: My Unlikely Path as a 22-Year-Old Lawmaker, which was published in January 2022.

In December 2019, Haskell was named as one of Forbes' 30 under 30 in Law and Policy. At the time, Haskell was the youngest state senator in the country.

Haskell serves as the Senate Chairman of the Transportation Committee and previously served as the Senate Chairman of the Higher Education and Employment Advancement Committee. He has also served on the Environment, Energy and Technology, Government Administration and Elections, Human Services, and Public Health Committees. In 2021, Haskell was appointed to Governor Lamont's Workforce Council. Haskell is a NewDEAL Leader. He was appointed by Senate President Martin Looney as Senate Deputy President Pro Tempore.

Haskell was involved in the unsuccessful fight to install tolls on Connecticut highways and helped lead the successful passage of legislation bringing free community college to Connecticut. He has voted in favor of Paid Family and Medical Leave, a $15 minimum wage, a ban on ghost guns, cannabis legalization and police accountability reforms. During his first term, he co-sponsored 23 new laws and held over 70 town hall meetings. Haskell has earned a 100% approval score from the Connecticut League of Conservation Voters, an "F" grade from the NRA Political Victory Fund, and a 100% attendance record for votes on the Senate floor. His campaigns and legislative career have been reported on in The New York Times, Teen Vogue, ABC News, Time Magazine, and Quartz.

External videos
- After Words interview with Haskell on 100,000 First Bosses, February 13, 2022, C-SPAN

On January 3, 2022, Haskell announced that he would not seek reelection that year and would retire at the end of his term, citing his desire to attend law school and live closer to his then-fiancée, Katie Cion, in New York City. Both are from in Westport, Connecticut.

== Electoral history ==
2020 Connecticut State Senate elections
Party	Candidate	Votes	%
Democratic	Will Haskell (incumbent)	38,581	58.3
Republican	Kim Healy	27,549	41.7
Total votes		66,130	100
Democratic hold			

2018 Connecticut State Senate elections
Party	Candidate	Votes	%
Democratic	Will Haskell	27,991	53.3
Republican	Toni Boucher (incumbent)	24,512	46.7
Total votes		52,503	100
Democratic gain from Republican			

== Personal life ==
On September 30, 2023, Haskell married Katie Cion, with whom he had been in a relationship since 2019.

Political offices
Preceded by Toni Boucher	Member of the Connecticut Senate from the 26th District; 2019–2023	Succeeded by Ceci Maher
