= Christine Cohen =

American politician (born 1976)

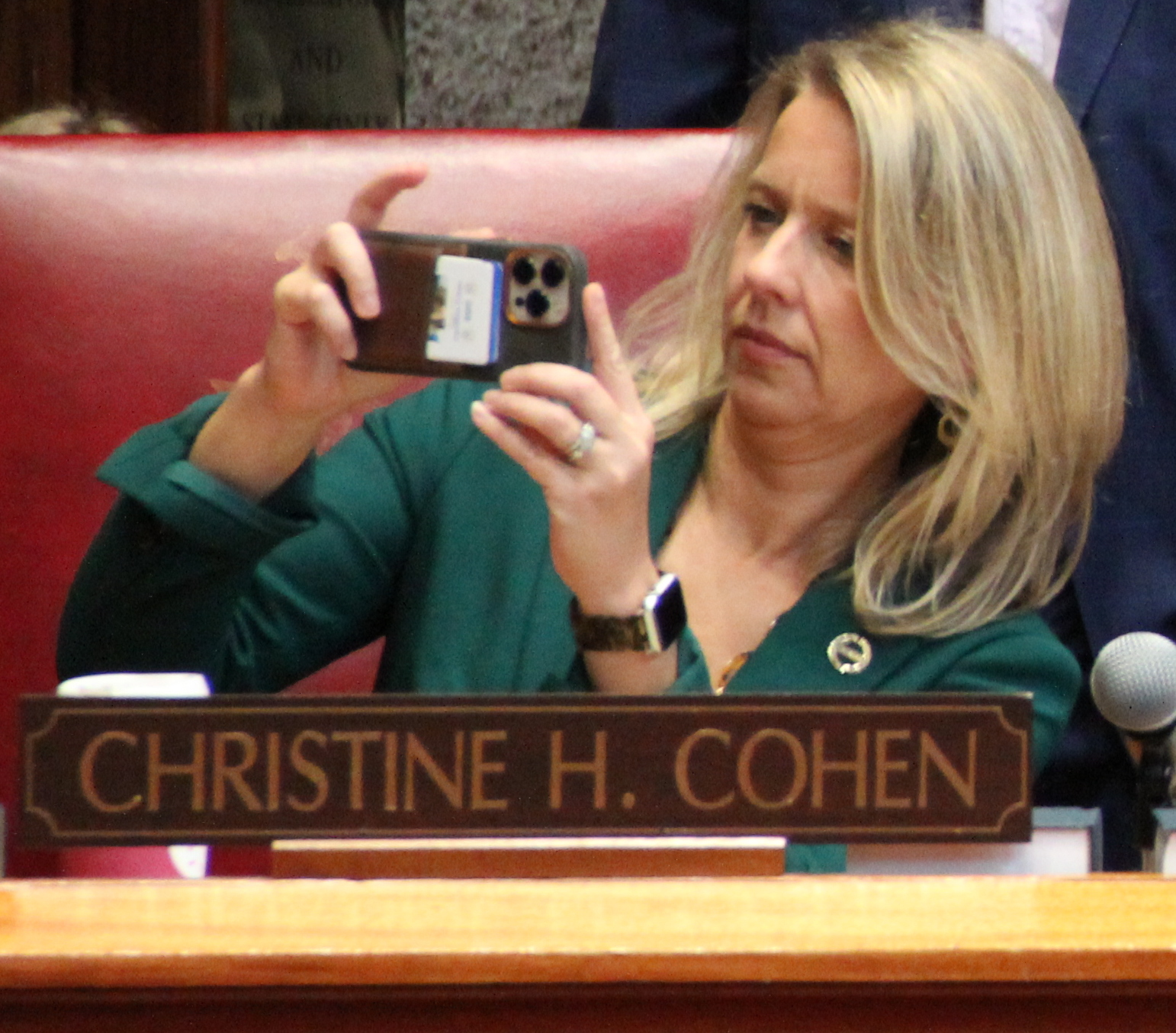
- Cohen in 2023

Member of the Connecticut State Senate from the 12th district
- Incumbent
- Assumed office January 9, 2019
- Preceded by: Edward M. Kennedy Jr.

Personal details
- Born: January 25, 1976 (age 50)
- Party: Democratic
- Spouse: Rob
- Children: 3
- Education: Western Connecticut State University (BBA)

Christine Hunter Cohen (born January 25, 1976) is an American politician. She was a member of the Guilford, Connecticut school board from 2015 to 2019, when she resigned to serve on the Connecticut State Senate from the 12th district.

== Education and early career ==
Cohen was born on 25 January 1976. She earned a Bachelor of Business Administration at Western Connecticut State University. Cohen previously worked for Stanley Black & Decker. With her husband Rob, Cohen has co-owned and operated the eponymous Cohen's Bagel's since 2003.

== Political career ==
Cohen was a member of the Guilford, Connecticut school board from November 2015. Following Edward M. Kennedy Jr.'s retirement, Cohen contested the Connecticut Senate's 12th district seat in 2018 as a Democratic Party candidate, facing Adam Greenberg and Jerry Mastrangelo. Mastrangelo later ended his campaign, and Cohen defeated Greenberg in the general election. Cohen took office as a state senator on 9 January 2019, which necessitated her resignation from the school board, on which she was replaced by Richard Hersh. Cohen stated in January 2020 that she would run for reelection from Connecticut's 12th Senate district.

== Personal life ==
Cohen and her husband Rob have three children. The couple moved to Madison in 2001, and since 2007, have lived in Guilford.
