= Steve Cassano =

American politician

Member of the Connecticut State Senate from the 4th district
- In office January 5, 2011 – 2023
- Preceded by: Mary Ann Handley
- Succeeded by: MD Rahman

Mayor of Manchester, Connecticut
- In office 1991–2005

Deputy Mayor of Manchester, Connecticut
- In office 1977–1981

Personal details
- Born: March 7, 1942 (age 84) Boston, Massachusetts
- Party: Democratic
- Spouse: Holly
- Children: 5
- Education: Manchester Community College; Boston State College; SUNY Albany; University of Connecticut
- Occupation: Retired Community College Professor and Business owner

Stephen T. Cassano (born March 7, 1942) is a retired American politician and former Deputy President Pro Tempore of the Connecticut State Senate, having first been elected as a member in 2010 and retiring at the end of 2022. Cassano was succeeded in the Connecticut State Senate by MD Rahman. He previously served as mayor of Manchester, Connecticut, from 1991 to 2005. Cassano is an alumnus of Manchester Community College, Boston State College (BA), the University at Albany, SUNY (MA) and the University of Connecticut (MSW).

While in the Connecticut State Senate, he served as Co-Chair of the Planning & Development Committee, as a Vice Chair of the Finance Revenue and Bonding Committee and as a member of the Transportation, Public Safety, and Insurance and Real Estate Committees.

== Connecticut Senate ==
=== Legislation ===
In 2011, Cassano was co-sponsor of the house bill 6308, the bill that established the Connecticut Healthcare Partnership in accordance with the Affordable Care Act. In 2012, he co-sponsored bills to repeal the death penalty and legalize the use of medical marijuana. Since 2016 Cassano has introduced multiple bills regarding the unrestricted access to birth records for adult adopted individuals. Other co-sponsored bills include increasing the minimum wage, authorized driver's licenses for undocumented residents and capping the out of pocket costs for insulin.

== Electoral history ==
Connecticut's 4th Senate District election, 2010
Party	Candidate	Votes	%
Democratic	Steve Cassano	18,561	50.1
Republican	Stewart Beckett	18,488	49.9

Connecticut's 4th Senate District election, 2012
Party	Candidate	Votes	%
Democratic	Steve Cassano	24,930	56.5
Republican	Cheri Ann Pelletier	19,184	43.5

Connecticut's 4th Senate District election, 2014
Party	Candidate	Votes	%
Democratic	Steve Cassano	16,567	48.9
Working Families	Steve Cassano	1,098	3.2
	Total	17,665	52.1
Republican	Whit Osgood	15,181	44.8
Independent	Whit Osgood	1,048	3.1
	Total	15,229	47.9

Connecticut's 4th Senate District election, 2016
Party	Candidate	Votes	%
Democratic	Steve Cassano	22,525	50.5
Republican	Lorraine Marchetti	22,125	49.5
