= Independent Party of Connecticut =

- Founded: August 23, 1966
- Political position: Center
- National affiliation: Alliance Party
- State Senate: 0 / 36
- State House: 0 / 151
- U.S. Senate: 0 / 2
- U.S. House: 0 / 5

Website
- https://ctindependents.org/

The Independent Party of Connecticut (IPC) is a minor political party in the State of Connecticut. As of November 3, 2014, Connecticut had 16,189 active voters registered with the Connecticut Secretary of State with the Independent party, making it the third largest party in the state. The party has had at least one elected official: in November 2013, Lawrence DePillo was elected to the Waterbury Board of Aldermen.

After a 2022 Independent Party gubernatorial convention in which party chairman Mike Telesca voted to break a 79-79 tie between businessmen Bob Stefanowski and Rob Hotaling, the Party nominated Hotaling. Hotaling failed to garner the necessary 1% to maintain ballot access for the Independent Party. As a result, Independent Party members who live in areas not governed by a local IP town committee forfeit their membership.

== History ==
In the 1930s, an Independent-Republican party was formed by Professor Albert Levitt of Redding, CT and Irving Fisher, a Yale economist. However, the official title of "Independent Party" was used later on. In 1958, Andrew C. LaCroix of Easton, Connecticut was acting treasurer of the Independent Party of Connecticut. The party backed Ms. Vivian Kellems of Stonington, Connecticut in a 1956 write-in campaign. At that time, Anthony Sparaco of Old Saybrook was president, and Rosemary Favale of Waterbury was vice-president. In 1959, Charles R. Iovino of Milford, Connecticut was also elected as an Independent write-in candidate. As early as 1967, the Independent Party of Connecticut successfully held meetings throughout the State. However, it is speculated that the Independent Party of Connecticut was actually formed on August 23, 1966.

== Town committees ==
An Independent Town Committee is a local organization that affiliates with the State-Central Executive Board. According to bylaws, they must consist of a Chairman, Vice-Chairman, Secretary, and Treasurer.

Town committees by city/town

- Bethel, Connecticut
- Bridgeport, Connecticut
- East Haven, Connecticut
- Milford, Connecticut
- Middletown, Connecticut
- Newtown, Connecticut
- Waterbury, Connecticut
- Watertown, Connecticut
- Winsted, Connecticut: Samuel Demonstranti, Chairman; David LaPointe, Treasurer

No Independent Party candidate of note has ever been elected in their own right.
