= 2024 Connecticut Senate election =

2024 Connecticut State Senate election
- November 5, 2024

All 36 seats in the Connecticut Senate 19 seats needed for a majority
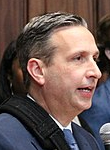

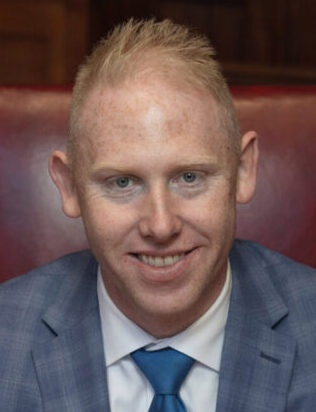
	Majority party	Minority party
Leader	Bob Duff	Stephen Harding
Party	Democratic	Republican
Leader since	January 7, 2015	February 16, 2024
Leader's seat	District 25	District 30
Last election	24	12
Seats won	25	11
Seat change	▲1	▼1
Popular vote	900,060	705,691
Percentage	55.82%	43.79%
Swing	▲2.86%	▼0.28%
- Results: Democratic gain Democratic hold Republican hold
President pro tempore of the Senate before election
Martin Looney
Democratic
Elected President pro tempore of the Senate
Martin Looney
Democratic

The 2024 Connecticut State Senate election was held on November 5, 2024, alongside the 2024 United States elections. Primary elections took place on August 13, 2024.

Democrats won one new seat, increasing their supermajority to 25 of the 36 Senate seats.

== Predictions ==
Source	Ranking	As of
270toWin	Safe D	June 21, 2024
CNalysis	Safe D	June 11, 2024
Sabato's Crystal Ball	Safe D	June 18, 2024

== Retirements ==
One incumbent did not seek re-election.

=== Democrats ===
1. District 22: Marilyn Moore retired.

== Summary of results ==
↓
25	11
**Democratic**	**Republican**

Parties	Candidates	Seats				Popular vote		
Parties	Candidates	2022	2024	+/-	Strength	Vote	%	Change
Democratic	34	24	25	▲1	69.44%	900,060	55.82%	▲2.86%
Republican	32	12	11	▼1	30.56%	705,691	43.79%	▼0.28%
Green	3	0	0	Steady	0.00%	3,957	0.25%	▼0.14%
Independent	2	0	0	Steady	0.00%	1,876	0.12%	▼1.20%
New Movement	1	0	0	Steady	0.00%	746	0.05%	▲0.05%
Total	72	36	36	0	100.00%	1,612,330	100.00%	-

Italics denote an open seat held by the incumbent party; bold text denotes a gain for a party.

State Senate District	Incumbent	Party	Elected Senator	Outcome
1	John Fonfara	Dem	John Fonfara	Dem Hold
2	Douglas McCrory	Dem	Douglas McCrory	Dem Hold
3	Saud Anwar	Dem	Saud Anwar	Dem Hold
4	MD Rahman	Dem	MD Rahman	Dem Hold
5	Derek Slap	Dem	Derek Slap	Dem Hold
6	Rick Lopes	Dem	Rick Lopes	Dem Hold
7	John Kissel	Rep	John Kissel	Rep Hold
8	Lisa Seminara	Rep	**Paul Honig**	**Dem Gain**
9	Matt Lesser	Dem	Matt Lesser	Dem Hold
10	Gary Winfield	Dem	Gary Winfield	Dem Hold
11	Martin Looney	Dem	Martin Looney	Dem Hold
12	Christine Cohen	Dem	Christine Cohen	Dem Hold
13	Jan Hochadel	Dem	Jan Hochadel	Dem Hold
14	James Maroney	Dem	James Maroney	Dem Hold
15	Joan Hartley	Dem	Joan Hartley	Dem Hold
16	Rob Sampson	Rep	Rob Sampson	Rep Hold
17	Jorge Cabrera	Dem	Jorge Cabrera	Dem Hold
18	Heather Somers	Rep	Heather Somers	Rep Hold
19	Cathy Osten	Dem	Cathy Osten	Dem Hold
20	Martha Marx	Dem	Martha Marx	Dem Hold
21	Kevin C. Kelly	Rep	Kevin C. Kelly	Rep Hold
22	Marilyn Moore	Dem	Sujata Gadkar-Wilcox	Dem Hold
23	Herron Gaston	Dem	Herron Gaston	Dem Hold
24	Julie Kushner	Dem	Julie Kushner	Dem Hold
25	Bob Duff	Dem	Bob Duff	Dem Hold
26	Ceci Maher	Dem	Ceci Maher	Dem Hold
27	Patricia Billie Miller	Dem	Patricia Billie Miller	Dem Hold
28	Tony Hwang	Rep	Tony Hwang	Rep Hold
29	Mae Flexer	Dem	Mae Flexer	Dem Hold
30	Stephen Harding	Rep	Stephen Harding	Rep Hold
31	Henri Martin	Rep	Henri Martin	Rep Hold
32	Eric Berthel	Rep	Eric Berthel	Rep Hold
33	Norman Needleman	Dem	Norman Needleman	Dem Hold
34	Paul Cicarella	Rep	Paul Cicarella	Rep Hold
35	Jeff Gordon	Rep	Jeff Gordon	Rep Hold
36	Ryan Fazio	Rep	Ryan Fazio	Rep Hold

== Detailed Results ==
=== District 1 ===
Incumbent Democratic Senator John Fonfara won re-election to a fifteenth term.

Connecticut's 1st State Senate district election, 2024
Party	Candidate	Votes	%
Democratic	John Fonfara (incumbent)	18,512	87.29%
Green	Luis R. Delgado	2,696	12.71%
Total votes		21,208	100.0%
Democratic hold			

=== District 2 ===
Incumbent Democratic Senator Douglas McCrory won re-election to a fourth full term.

Connecticut's 2nd State Senate district election, 2024
Party	Candidate	Votes	%
Democratic	Douglas McCrory (incumbent)	30,086	82.43%
Republican	Kristin Hoffman	6,411	17.57%
Total votes		36,491	100.0%
Democratic hold			

=== District 3 ===
Incumbent Democratic Senator Saud Anwar won re-election to a fourth term.

Connecticut's 3rd State Senate district election, 2024
Party	Candidate	Votes	%
Democratic	Saud Anwar (incumbent)	27,359	63.73%
Republican	Matt Siracusa	15,570	36.27%
Total votes		42,929	100.0%
Democratic hold			

=== District 4 ===
Incumbent Democratic Senator MD Rahman won re-election to a second term.

Connecticut's 4th State Senate district election, 2024
Party	Candidate	Votes	%
Democratic	MD Rahman (incumbent)	33,099	64.24%
Republican	Stephen King	18,422	35.76%
Total votes		51,521	100.0%
Democratic hold			

=== District 5 ===
Incumbent Democratic Senator Derek Slap won re-election to a third full term.

Connecticut's 5th State Senate district election, 2024
Party	Candidate	Votes	%
Democratic	Derek Slap (incumbent)	36,671	68.16%
Republican	Kyla Zimmermann	17,132	31.84%
Total votes		53,803	100.0%
Democratic hold			

=== District 6 ===
Incumbent Democratic Senator Rick Lopes won re-election to a third term.

Connecticut's 6th State Senate district election, 2024
Party	Candidate	Votes	%
Democratic	Rick Lopes (incumbent)	20,167	58.44%
Republican	Tremell J. Collins	14,340	41.56%
Total votes		34,507	100.0%
Democratic hold			

=== District 7 ===
Incumbent Republican Senator John Kissel won re-election to a sixteenth full term.

Connecticut's 7th State Senate district election, 2024
Party	Candidate	Votes	%
Republican	John Kissel (incumbent)	28,277	54.42%
Democratic	Cynthia Mangini	23,679	45.58%
Total votes		51,956	100.0%
Republican hold			

=== District 8 ===
Incumbent Republican Senator Lisa Seminara ran for re-election to a second term, but was defeated by Democratic nominee Paul Honig in a rematch.

Connecticut's 8th State Senate district election, 2024
Party	Candidate	Votes	%
Democratic	Paul Honig	28,940	50.28%
Republican	Lisa Seminara (incumbent)	28,621	49.72%
Total votes		57,561	100.0%
Democratic gain from Republican			

=== District 9 ===
Incumbent Democratic Senator Matt Lesser won re-election to a fourth term unopposed.

Connecticut's 9th State Senate district election, 2024
Party	Candidate	Votes	%
Democratic	Matt Lesser (incumbent)	35,500	100.0%
Total votes		35,500	100.0%
Democratic hold			

=== District 10 ===
Incumbent Democratic Senator Gary Winfield won re-election to a sixth full term.

Connecticut's 10th State Senate district election, 2024
Party	Candidate	Votes	%
Democratic	Gary Winfield (incumbent)	20,748	82.56%
Republican	Nyrell Moore	4,384	17.44%
Total votes		25,132	100.0%
Democratic hold			

=== District 11 ===
Incumbent Democratic Senator and President pro tempore of the Connecticut Senate Martin Looney won re-election to a seventeenth term.

Connecticut's 11th State Senate district election, 2024
Party	Candidate	Votes	%
Democratic	Martin Looney (incumbent)	24,283	77.77%
Republican	Steve Orosco	6,943	22.23%
Total votes		31,226	100.0%
Democratic hold			

=== District 12 ===
Incumbent Democratic Senator Christine Cohen won re-election to a fourth term.

Connecticut's 12th State Senate district election, 2024
Party	Candidate	Votes	%
Democratic	Christine Cohen (incumbent)	34,447	56.33%
Republican	Paul Crisci	26,709	43.67%
Total votes		61,156	100.0%
Democratic hold			

=== District 13 ===
Incumbent Democratic Senator Jan Hochadel won re-election to a second term.

Connecticut's 13th State Senate district election, 2024
Party	Candidate	Votes	%
Democratic	Jan Hochadel (incumbent)	23,821	53.66%
Republican	Elain Cariati	19,507	43.94%
Independent	Gwen Samuel	1,063	2.39%
Total votes		44,391	100.0%
Democratic hold			

=== District 14 ===
Incumbent Democratic Senator James Maroney won re-election to a fourth term.

Connecticut's 14th State Senate district election, 2024
Party	Candidate	Votes	%
Democratic	James Maroney (incumbent)	28,501	56.00%
Republican	Steven Johnstone	22,396	44.00%
Total votes		50,897	100.0%
Democratic hold			

=== District 15 ===
Incumbent Democratic Senator Joan Hartley won re-election to a thirteenth term unopposed.

Connecticut's 15th State Senate district election, 2024
Party	Candidate	Votes	%
Democratic	Joan Hartley (incumbent)	20,972	100.0%
Total votes		20,972	100.0%
Democratic hold			

=== District 16 ===
Incumbent Republican Senator Rob Sampson won re-election to a fourth term.

Connecticut's 16th State Senate district election, 2024
Party	Candidate	Votes	%
Republican	Rob Sampson (incumbent)	29,813	56.58%
Democratic	Christopher R. Robertson	22,877	43.42%
Total votes		52,690	100.0%
Republican hold			

=== District 17 ===
Incumbent Democratic Senator Jorge Cabrera won re-election to a third term unopposed.

Connecticut's 17th State Senate district election, 2024
Party	Candidate	Votes	%
Democratic	Jorge Cabrera (incumbent)	27,243	100.0%
Total votes		27,243	100.0%
Democratic hold			

=== District 18 ===
Incumbent Republican Senator Heather Somers won re-election to a fifth term.

Connecticut's 18th State Senate district election, 2024
Party	Candidate	Votes	%
Republican	Heather Somers (incumbent)	29,124	59.03%
Democratic	Andrew Parrella	20,217	40.97%
Total votes		49,341	100.0%
Republican hold			

=== District 19 ===
Incumbent Democratic Senator Cathy Osten won re-election to a seventh term.

Connecticut's 19th State Senate district election, 2024
Party	Candidate	Votes	%
Democratic	Cathy Osten (incumbent)	26,902	56.92%
Republican	Jason Guidone	20,360	43.08%
Total votes		47,262	100.0%
Democratic hold			

=== District 20 ===
Incumbent Democratic Senator Martha Marx won re-election to a second term.

Connecticut's 20th State Senate district election, 2024
Party	Candidate	Votes	%
Democratic	Martha Marx (incumbent)	27,864	56.15%
Republican	Shaun Mastroianni	21,757	43.85%
Total votes		49,621	100.0%
Democratic hold			

=== District 21 ===
Incumbent Republican Senator Kevin C. Kelly won re-election to an eighth term unopposed.

It was announced on January 7, 2025 that Governor Ned Lamont plans to appoint Kelly to the Connecticut Superior Court. Kelly did not take the oath of office the following day, and a special election will be held to fill the seat for the remainder of Kelly's term.

Connecticut's 21st State Senate district election, 2024
Party	Candidate	Votes	%
Republican	Kevin C. Kelly (incumbent)	36,236	100.0%
Total votes		36,236	100.0%
Republican hold			

=== District 22 ===
Incumbent Democratic Senator Marilyn Moore chose to retire instead of running for re-election to a sixth term. Democratic nominee Sujata Gadkar-Wilcox won the open seat.

Democratic primary
Party	Candidate	Votes	%
Democratic	Sujata Gadkar-Wilcox	1,753	41.06%
Democratic	Bill Finch	1,188	27.83%
Democratic	Tyler Mack	732	17.15%
Democratic	Scott Burns	596	13.96%
Total votes		4,269	100.00%

Connecticut's 22nd State Senate district election, 2024
Party	Candidate	Votes	%
Democratic	Sujata Gadkar-Wilcox	23,712	57.69%
Republican	Christopher Carrena	16,577	40.33%
Independent	Robert Halstead	813	1.98%
Total votes		41,102	100.0%
Democratic hold			

=== District 23 ===
Incumbent Democratic Senator Herron Gaston won re-election to a second term.

Former Democratic Senator Ernie Newton, who pled guilty to federal felony corruption charges in September 2005 and served several years in federal prison and was later arrested in 2013 for campaign finance violations, made his third unsuccessful attempt at a comeback to the General Assembly, challenging Gaston in the Democratic primary, as well as running as an independent candidate in the general election.

Democratic primary
Party	Candidate	Votes	%
Democratic	Herron Gaston (incumbent)	1,824	71.61%
Democratic	Ernie Newton	723	28.39%
Total votes		2,547	100.00%

Connecticut's 23rd State Senate district election, 2024
Party	Candidate	Votes	%
Democratic	Herron Gaston (incumbent)	15,848	77.07%
Republican	Brian Banacowski	3,969	19.30%
Independent	Ernie Newton	746	3.63%
Total votes		20,563	100.0%
Democratic hold			

=== District 24 ===
Incumbent Democratic Senator Julie Kushner won re-election to a fourth term.

Connecticut's 24th State Senate district election, 2024
Party	Candidate	Votes	%
Democratic	Julie Kushner (incumbent)	21,450	53.48%
Republican	Michelle Coelho	18,656	46.52%
Total votes		40,106	100.0%
Democratic hold			

=== District 25 ===
Incumbent Democratic Senator and Majority Leader Bob Duff won re-election to an eleventh term.

Connecticut's 25th State Senate district election, 2024
Party	Candidate	Votes	%
Democratic	Bob Duff (incumbent)	29,929	64.61%
Republican	Martin Tagliaferro	16,396	35.39%
Total votes		46,325	100.0%
Democratic hold			

=== District 26 ===
Incumbent Democratic Senator Ceci Maher won re-election to a second term.

Connecticut's 26th State Senate district election, 2024
Party	Candidate	Votes	%
Democratic	Ceci Maher (incumbent)	35,713	61.13%
Republican	Kami Evans	22,708	38.87%
Total votes		58,421	100.0%
Democratic hold			

=== District 27 ===
Incumbent Democratic Senator Patricia Billie Miller won re-election to a second full term.

Connecticut's 27th State Senate district election, 2024
Party	Candidate	Votes	%
Democratic	Patricia Billie Miller (incumbent)	23,980	62.31%
Republican	Nicola Tarzia	14,506	37.69%
Total votes		38,486	100.0%
Democratic hold			

=== District 28 ===
2024 election results by precinct, CT Senate District 28: Hwang 50–55% 55–60% / Blanchard 50–55%

Incumbent Republican Senator Tony Hwang won re-election to a sixth term.

Connecticut's 28th State Senate district election, 2024
Party	Candidate	Votes	%
Republican	Tony Hwang (incumbent)	33,172	54.61%
Democratic	Robert Blanchard	27,572	45.39%
Total votes		60,744	100.0%
Republican hold			

=== District 29 ===
Incumbent Democratic Senator Mae Flexer won re-election to a sixth term.

Connecticut's 29th State Senate district election, 2024
Party	Candidate	Votes	%
Democratic	Mae Flexer (incumbent)	21,385	49.78%
Republican	Christopher Reddy	20,796	48.41%
Green	Alice Leibowitz	778	1.81%
Total votes		42,959	100.0%
Democratic hold			

=== District 30 ===
Incumbent Republican Senator and Minority Leader Stephen Harding won re-election to a second term.

Connecticut's 30th State Senate district election, 2024
Party	Candidate	Votes	%
Republican	Stephen Harding (incumbent)	31,127	53.61%
Democratic	Justin Potter	26,931	46.39%
Total votes		58,058	100.0%
Republican hold			

=== District 31 ===
Incumbent Republican Senator Henri Martin won re-election to a sixth term unopposed.

Connecticut's 31st State Senate district election, 2024
Party	Candidate	Votes	%
Republican	Henri Martin (incumbent)	33,304	100.0%
Total votes		33,304	100.0%
Republican hold			

=== District 32 ===
Incumbent Republican Senator Eric Berthel won re-election to a fourth full term.

Connecticut's 32nd State Senate district election, 2024
Party	Candidate	Votes	%
Republican	Eric Berthel (incumbent)	35,122	57.22%
Democratic	Jeffrey Desmarais	26,256	42.78%
Total votes		61,378	100.0%
Republican hold			

=== District 33 ===
Incumbent Democratic Senator Norman Needleman won re-election to a fourth term.

Connecticut's 33rd State Senate district election, 2024
Party	Candidate	Votes	%
Democratic	Norman Needleman (incumbent)	34,825	56.86%
Republican	Jeffrey Duigou	26,427	43.14%
Total votes		61,252	100.0%
Democratic hold			

=== District 34 ===
Incumbent Republican Senator Paul Cicarella won re-election to a third term.

Connecticut's 34th State Senate district election, 2024
Party	Candidate	Votes	%
Republican	Paul Cicarella (incumbent)	29,023	56.21%
Democratic	Brandi Mandato	22,126	42.85%
Green	David Bedell	483	0.94%
Total votes		51,632	100.0%
Republican hold			

=== District 35 ===
Incumbent Republican Senator Jeff Gordon won re-election to a second term.

Connecticut's 35th State Senate district election, 2024
Party	Candidate	Votes	%
Republican	Jeff Gordon (incumbent)	28,613	52.92%
Democratic	Merry C. Garrett	25,453	47.08%
Total votes		54,066	100.0%
Republican hold			

=== District 36 ===
2024 Connecticut's 36th State Senate district election
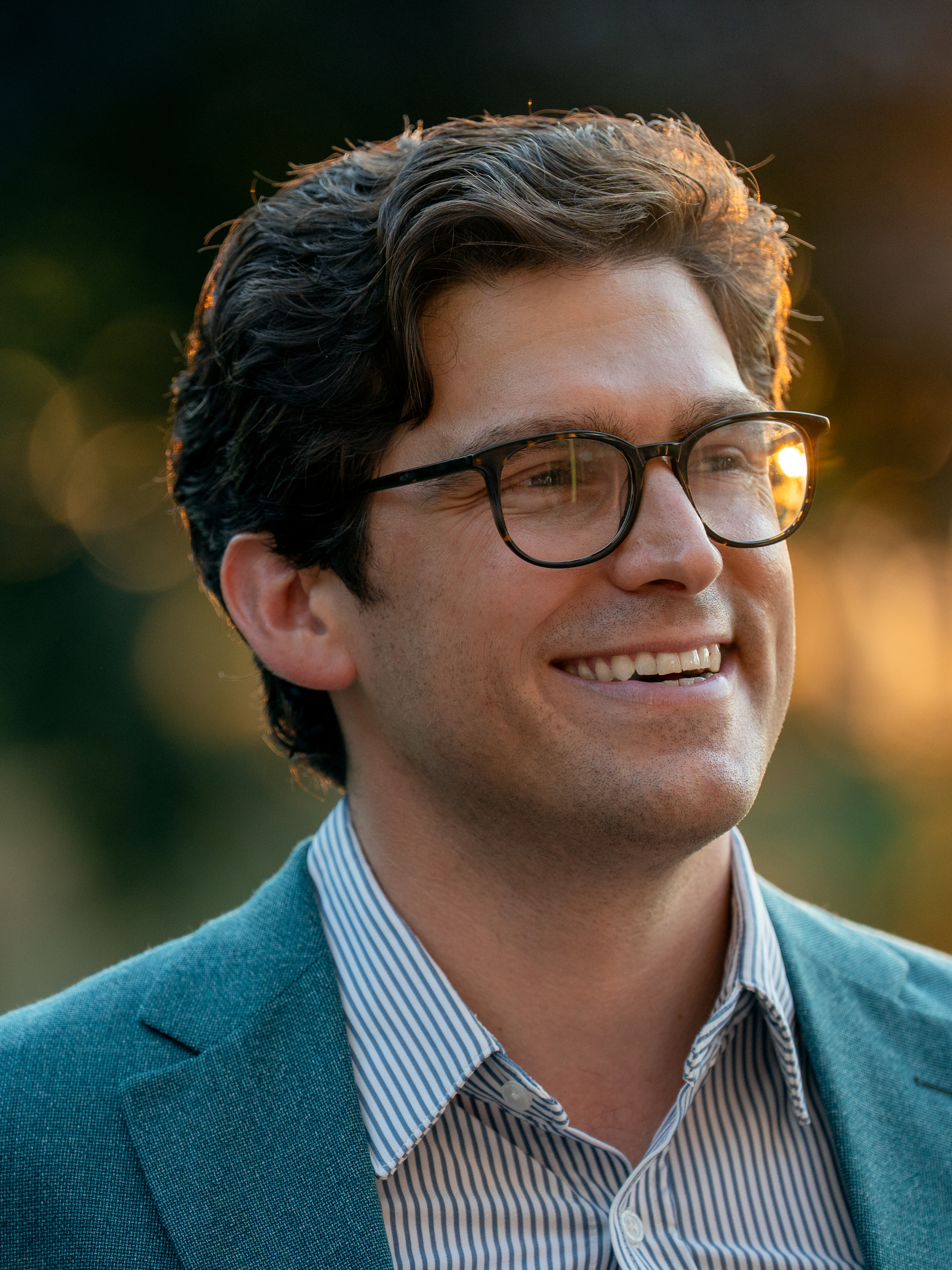

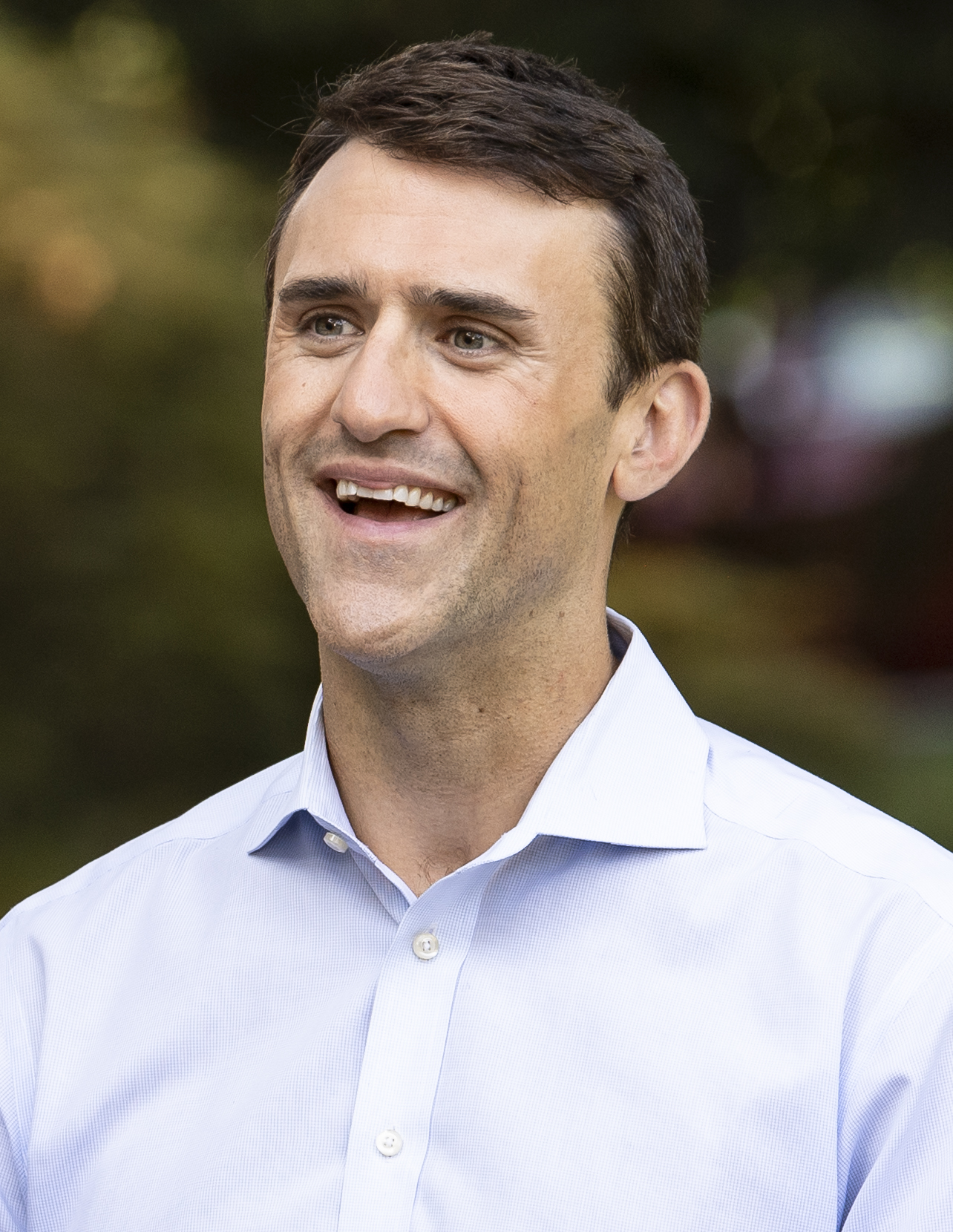
Candidate	Ryan Fazio	Nick Simmons
Party	Republican	Democratic
Alliance		Independent
Popular vote	29,293	27,334
Percentage	51.73%	48.27%
- Precinct results Fazio 50–60% 60–70% Simmons 50–60% 60–70%

Incumbent Republican Senator Ryan Fazio won re-election to a third term against Nick Simmons, the former deputy Chief of Staff to governor Ned Lamont and brother of Stamford Mayor Caroline Simmons.

The previous Democratic candidate for this district, Trevor Crow, initially ran for this seat again, but dropped out after Democratic town committees in Greenwich and New Canaan selected delegates to the nominating convention who publicly supported Simmons.

Ryan Fazio had the best overperformance in the entire state, winning reelection and increasing his margin by 3% compared to Kamala Harris's 14 point win in the district.

The race was also the most expensive CT State Senate race in the history of the State. Simmons raised hundreds of thousands of dollars, including substantial contributions from outside the three municipalities in the district. By late October, he had also loaned his campaign $160,000 of his own money. Outside political committees spent additional money supporting Simmons or opposing Fazio. by early November, several independent expenditure groups had reported roughly $176,000 in spending, while the overall outside spending discussed publicly was approaching $270,000.

Connecticut's 36th State Senate district election, 2024
Party	Candidate	Votes	%
Republican	Ryan Fazio (incumbent)	29,293	51.73%
Total	Nick Simmons	27,334	48.27%
Democratic	Nick Simmons	26,583	46.94%
Independent Party	Nick Simmons	751	1.33%
Total votes		56,627	100.00%
Republican hold			
