= 2012 Connecticut elections =

On November 6, 2012, the state of Connecticut held elections for presidential electors, representatives and senators to the U.S. Congress, as well as the members of the Connecticut State Senate. The general elections saw a total turnout of 73.89%.

Primary elections were held on August 14 of the same year.

== United States President ==
Connecticut selected the incumbent Democratic ticket of Barack Obama and Joe Biden.

2012 United States Presidential election in Connecticut
Party	Candidate	Votes	%
Democratic	Barack Obama & Joe Biden	912,531	58.41
Republican	Mitt Romney & Paul Ryan	631,432	40.42
Libertarian	Gary Johnson & Jim Gray	12,628	0.81
Justice	Rocky Anderson & Luis Rodriguez	5,596	0.36
Total votes		1,562,187	100.00
Democratic win			

== United States House of Representatives ==
All five of the Connecticut seats to the House of Representatives were up for elections. The Democratic Party held on to all five seats.

== United States Senate ==
Connecticut elected Chris Murphy, the former representative Member of the House of Representatives from Connecticut's 5th district.

2012 United States Senate election in Connecticut
Party	Candidate	Votes	%
Democratic	Chris Murphy	815,077	55.15
Republican	Linda McMahon	637,857	43.16
Libertarian	Paul Passarelli	24,883	1.68
Total votes		1,477,817	100.00
Democratic hold			

== Connecticut State Senate ==
All 36 of the seats in Connecticut State Senate were up for election. After the election, the Democratic Party held on to the majority with 22 seats.

Winning candidates for the State Senate
Districts	Party	Candidate	Votes	%
1	Democratic	John Fonfara	20,678	80.73
2	Democratic	Eric D. Coleman	31,114	85.50
3	Democratic	Gary LeBeau	27,640	70.56
4	Democratic	Steve Cassano	24,930	56.51
5	Democratic	Beth Bye	34,542	100.00
6	Democratic	Terry Gerratana	21,212	72.09
7	Republican	John Kissel	22,182	50.58
8	Republican	Kevin Witkos	28,498	60.03
9	Democratic	Paul Doyle	28,995	67.15
10	Democratic	Toni Harp	27,121	100.00
11	Democratic	Martin Looney	28,689	100.00
12	Democratic	Edward Meyer	25,888	53.24
13	Democratic	Danté Bartolomeo	19,934	50.35
14	Democratic	Gayle Slossberg	27,696	64.34
15	Democratic	Joan Hartley	19,927	85.15
16	Republican	Joe Markley	22,455	52.20
17	Democratic	Joe Crisco	26,994	71.15
18	Democratic	Andrew Maynard	23,380	60.83
19	Democratic	Cathy Osten	19,882	51.56
20	Democratic	Andrea L. Stillman	24,222	60.24
21	Republican	Kevin C. Kelly	28,528	100.00
22	Democratic	Anthony Musto	24,512	67.32
23	Democratic	Andres Jr. Ayala	19,842	91.62
24	Republican	Michael McLachlan	18,537	51.72
25	Democratic	Bob Duff	27,015	66.93
26	Republican	Toni Boucher	31,824	58.57
27	Democratic	Carlo Leone	19,834	61.49
28	Republican	John P. McKinney	33,368	100.00
29	Democratic	Donald E. Williams	21,567	62.38
30	Republican	Clark Chapin	23,712	54.91
31	Republican	Jason C. Welch	20,506	51.09
32	Republican	Robert Kane	28,591	63.37
33	Republican	Art Linares	23,915	48.33
34	Republican	Len Fasano	24,359	58.05
35	Republican	Tony Guglielmo	27,840	59.53
36	Republican	Scott Frantz	27,623	60.96
