= Historic members of the Connecticut Senate =

American politician

These are tables of members of the Connecticut Senate.

== Connecticut Senate ==
Years	District																					
Years	1st	2nd	3rd	4th	5th	6th	7th	8th	9th	10th	11th	12th	13th	14th	15th	16th	17th	18th	19th	20th	21st	22nd
1993-1994	William A. DiBella (D)	Thirman Milner (D)	John Larson (D)	Michael Meotti (D)	Kevin Sullivan (D)	Joseph Harper (D)	Con O'Leary (D)	James Fleming (R)	Richard Balducci (D)	Toni Harp (D)	Martin Looney (D)	William Aniskovich (R)	Amelia Mustone (D)	Win Smith (R)	Thomas Upson (R)	Stephen Somma (R)	Joseph Crisco Jr. (D)	Cathy Cook (R)	Kenneth Przybysz (D)	Melodie Peters (D)	George Gunther (R)	Lee Scarpetti (R)
1995-1996	William A. DiBella (D)	Eric Coleman (D)	Kevin Rennie (R)	Paul Munns (R)	Kevin Sullivan (D)	Thomas Bozek (D)	John Kissel (R)	James Fleming (R)	Biagio Ciotto (D)	Toni Harp (D)	Martin Looney (D)	William Aniskovich (R)	Thomas Gaffey (D)	Win Smith (R)	Thomas Upson (R)	Stephen Somma (R)	Joseph Crisco Jr. (D)	Cathy Cook (R)	Edith Prague (D)	Melodie Peters (D)	George Gunther (R)	Lee Scarpetti (R)
1997-1998	John Fonfara (D)	Eric Coleman (D)	Gary LeBeau (D)	Mary Ann Handley (D)	Kevin Sullivan (D)	Thomas Bozek (D)	John Kissel (R)	James Fleming (R)	Biagio Ciotto (D)	Toni Harp (D)	Martin Looney (D)	William Aniskovich (R)	Thomas Gaffey (D)	Win Smith (R)	Thomas Upson (R)	Stephen Somma (R)	Joseph Crisco Jr. (D)	Cathy Cook (R)	Edith Prague (D)	Melodie Peters (D)	George Gunther (R)	Lee Scarpetti (R)
1999-2000	John Fonfara (D)	Eric Coleman (D)	Gary LeBeau (D)	Mary Ann Handley (D)	Kevin Sullivan (D)	Thomas Bozek (D)	John Kissel (R)	Thomas Herlihy (R)	Biagio Ciotto (D)	Toni Harp (D)	Martin Looney (D)	William Aniskovich (R)	Thomas Gaffey (D)	Win Smith (R)	Thomas Upson (R)	Stephen Somma (R)	Joseph Crisco Jr. (D)	Cathy Cook (R)	Edith Prague (D)	Melodie Peters (D)	George Gunther (R)	Lee Scarpetti (R)
2001-2002	John Fonfara (D)	Eric Coleman (D)	Gary LeBeau (D)	Mary Ann Handley (D)	Kevin Sullivan (D)	Thomas Bozek (D)	John Kissel (R)	Thomas Herlihy (R)	Biagio Ciotto (D)	Toni Harp (D)	Martin Looney (D)	William Aniskovich (R)	Thomas Gaffey (D)	Win Smith (R)	Joan Hartley (D)	Stephen Somma (R)	Joseph Crisco Jr. (D)	Cathy Cook (R)	Edith Prague (D)	Melodie Peters (D)	George Gunther (R)	Bill Finch (D)
2003-2004	John Fonfara (D)	Eric Coleman (D)	Gary LeBeau (D)	Mary Ann Handley (D)	Kevin Sullivan (D)	Donald DeFronzo (D)	John Kissel (R)	Thomas Herlihy (R)	Biagio Ciotto (D)	Toni Harp (D)	Martin Looney (D)	William Aniskovich (R)	Thomas Gaffey (D)	Win Smith (R)	Joan Hartley (D)	Chris Murphy (D)	Joseph Crisco Jr. (D)	Cathy Cook (R)	Edith Prague (D)	Melodie Peters (D)	George Gunther (R)	Bill Finch (D)
2005-2006	John Fonfara (D)	Eric Coleman (D)	Gary LeBeau (D)	Mary Ann Handley (D)	Jonathan Harris (D)	Donald DeFronzo (D)	John Kissel (R)	Thomas Herlihy (R)	Biagio Ciotto (D)	Toni Harp (D)	Martin Looney (D)	Edward Meyer (D)	Thomas Gaffey (D)	Gayle Slossberg (D)	Joan Hartley (D)	Chris Murphy (D)	Joseph Crisco Jr. (D)	Cathy Cook (R)	Edith Prague (D)	Andrea Stillman (D)	George Gunther (R)	Bill Finch (D)
2007-2008	John Fonfara (D)	Eric Coleman (D)	Gary LeBeau (D)	Mary Ann Handley (D)	Jonathan Harris (D)	Donald DeFronzo (D)	John Kissel (R)	Thomas Herlihy (R)	Paul Doyle (D)	Toni Harp (D)	Martin Looney (D)	Edward Meyer (D)	Thomas Gaffey (D)	Gayle Slossberg (D)	Joan Hartley (D)	Sam Caligiuri (R)	Joseph Crisco Jr. (D)	Andrew Maynard (D)	Edith Prague (D)	Andrea Stillman (D)	Dan Debicella (R)	Anthony Musto (D)
2009-2010	John Fonfara (D)	Eric Coleman (D)	Gary LeBeau (D)	Mary Ann Handley (D)	Jonathan Harris (D)	Donald DeFronzo (D)	John Kissel (R)	Kevin Witkos (R)	Paul Doyle (D)	Toni Harp (D)	Martin Looney (D)	Edward Meyer (D)	Thomas Gaffey (D)	Gayle Slossberg (D)	Joan Hartley (D)	Sam Caligiuri (R)	Joseph Crisco Jr. (D)	Andrew Maynard (D)	Edith Prague (D)	Andrea Stillman (D)	Dan Debicella (R)	Anthony Musto (D)
2011-2012	John Fonfara (D)	Eric Coleman (D)	Gary LeBeau (D)	Steve Cassano (D)	Beth Bye (D)	Donald DeFronzo (D)	John Kissel (R)	Kevin Witkos (R)	Paul Doyle (D)	Toni Harp (D)	Martin Looney (D)	Edward Meyer (D)	Thomas Gaffey (D)	Gayle Slossberg (D)	Joan Hartley (D)	Joe Markley (R)	Joseph Crisco Jr. (D)	Andrew Maynard (D)	Edith Prague (D)	Andrea Stillman (D)	Kevin Kelly (R)	Anthony Musto (D)
2013-2014	John Fonfara (D)	Eric Coleman (D)	Gary LeBeau (D)	Steve Cassano (D)	Beth Bye (D)	Terry Gerratana (D)	John Kissel (R)	Kevin Witkos (R)	Paul Doyle (D)	Toni Harp (D)	Martin Looney (D)	Edward Meyer (D)	Danté Bartolomeo (D)	Gayle Slossberg (D)	Joan Hartley (D)	Joe Markley (R)	Joseph Crisco Jr. (D)	Andrew Maynard (D)	Carlo Leone (D)	Andrea Stillman (D)	Kevin Kelly (R)	Anthony Musto (D)
