= Connecticut's 16th House of Representatives district =

American legislative district

Connecticut's 16th State House of Representatives district
Representative
Melissa Osborne; D

Connecticut's 16th House of Representatives district elects one member of the Connecticut House of Representatives. Its current representative is Melissa Osborne, who held the seat for the Democratic Party after John Hampton's retirement. The district consists of the entire town of Simsbury.

== List of representatives ==
List of Representatives from Connecticut's 16th State House District
Representative	Party	Years	District home	Note
George W. Hannon Jr.	Democratic	1967–1973	East Hartford	Seat created
Virginia Connolly	Republican	1973–1981	West Simsbury	
James T. Fleming	Republican	1981–1991	Simsbury	
Paul Knierim	Republican	1991–1997	Simsbury	Did not run for reelection
Thomas Herlihy	Republican	1997–1999	Simsbury	Elected to Connecticut Senate
Robert W. Heagney	Republican	1999–2007	Simsbury	Defeated for reelection
Linda Schofield	Democratic	2007–2013	Simsbury	Did not run for reelection
John Hampton	Democratic	2013–2023	Simsbury	Did not run for reelection
Melissa Osborne	Democratic	2023–present	Simsbury	Incumbent

== Recent elections ==
State Election 2010: House District 16
Party	Candidate	Votes	%	±%
Democratic	Linda Schofield	6,585	59.6	+3.2
Republican	Gregory W. Piecuch	4,381	39.6	−1.0
Independent	Robert H. Kalechman	86	0.8	+0.4
Majority		2,204	19.9	+4.1
Turnout		11,052		
Democratic hold		Swing	+2.1	

State Election 2008: House District 16
Party	Candidate	Votes	%	±%
Democratic	Linda Schofield	7,607	56.4	+7.3
Republican	Robert Heagney	5,477	40.6	−8.4
Working Families	Deborah B. Noble	340	2.5	+1.0
Independent	Robert H. Kalechman	52	0.4	+0.0
Majority		2,130	15.8	+14.2
Turnout		13,476		
Democratic hold		Swing	+8.9	

State Election 2006: House District 16
Party	Candidate	Votes	%	±%
Democratic	Linda Schofield	5,369	49.1	+16.3
Republican	Robert Heagney	5,356	49.0	−16.1
Working Families	Linda Schofield	167	1.5	+0.1
Independent	Robert H. Kalechman	42	0.4	−0.3
Majority		180	1.6	−33.9
Turnout		10,934		
Democratic gain from Republican		Swing	+16.2	

State Election 2004: House District 16
Party	Candidate	Votes	%	±%
Republican	Robert Heagney	8,283	65.1	−34.9
Democratic	Joshua C. Storm	4,173	32.8	+32.8
Working Families	Stephanie L. Rosenberg	184	1.4	+1.4
Independent	Robert H. Kalechman	92	0.7	+0.7
Majority		4,110	32.3	−67.7
Turnout		12,732		
Republican hold		Swing	-33.9	

State Election 2002: House District 16
Party	Candidate	Votes	%	±%
Republican	Robert Heagney	7,259	100.0	+0.0
Majority		7,259	100.0	+0.0
Turnout		7,259		
Republican hold		Swing	+0.0	

State Election 2000: House District 16
Party	Candidate	Votes	%	±%
Republican	Robert Heagney	9,008	100.0	+34.7
Majority		9,008	100.0	+69.3
Turnout		9,008		
Republican hold		Swing	+34.7	

State Election 1998: House District 16
Party	Candidate	Votes	%	±%
Republican	Robert Heagney	6,082	65.3	−5.2
Democratic	John K. Hampton	3,228	34.7	+5.2
Majority		2,854	30.7	−10.3
Turnout		9,310		
Republican hold		Swing	-5.2	

State Election 1996: House District 16
Party	Candidate	Votes	%	±%
Republican	Thomas J. Herlihy, Jr.	8,371	70.5	−0.4
Democratic	Huguet Pameijer	3,504	29.5	+11.9
Majority		4,867	41.0	−0.8
Turnout		11,875		
Republican hold		Swing	-11.5	

State Election 1994: House District 16
Party	Candidate	Votes	%	±%
Republican	Paul J. Knierim	7,355	70.9	+18.7
Democratic	Charles D. Houlihan	1,830	17.6	−7.9
A Connecticut Party (1990)	Charles D. Houlihan	1,181	11.4	−10.8
Majority		4,334	41.8	+15.1
Turnout		10,376		
Republican hold		Swing	+18.7	

State Election 1992: House District 16
Party	Candidate	Votes	%	±%
Republican	Paul J. Knierim	6,708	52.2	−14.5
Democratic	Elaine C. Summers	3,281	25.5	−7.8
A Connecticut Party (1990)	Anita L. Mielert	2,852	22.2	+22.2
Majority		3,427	26.7	−6.8
Turnout		12,841		
Republican hold		Swing	-14.5	

State Election 1990: House District 16
Party	Candidate	Votes	%	±%
Republican	Paul J. Knierim	6,623	66.7	
Democratic	William J. Tyszka	3,302	33.3	
Majority		3,321	33.5	
Turnout		9,925		
Republican hold		Swing		
