= Brandi Mandato =

American politician

Member-elect of the Connecticut State Senate from the 34th district
- Assuming office January 2027
- Succeeding: Paul Cicarella

Personal details
- Party: Democratic

Brandi Mandato is an American politician. A member of the Democratic Party, she is the member-elect for the 34th district of the Connecticut State Senate.
