= Senator Musto =

Senator Musto may refer to:

- Anthony Musto (born 1968), Connecticut State Senate
- Ray Musto (1929–2014), Pennsylvania State Senate
- William Musto (1917–2006), New Jersey State Senate
