= Thomas Herlihy =

American politician (1956–2015)

Thomas J. Herlihy, Jr.

Member of the Connecticut State Senate from the 8th district
- In office 1999–2009
- Preceded by: James T. Fleming
- Succeeded by: Kevin Witkos
- Constituency: represents Avon, Barkhamsted, Canton, Colebrook, Granby, Hartland, Harwinton, New Hartford, Norfolk, Simsbury, and Torrington

Member of the Connecticut House of Representatives from the 16th district
- In office 1991–1999
- Preceded by: Paul J. Knierim
- Succeeded by: Robert W. Heagney

Personal details
- Born: November 29, 1956 Queens, New York, U.S.
- Died: May 8, 2015 (aged 58)
- Party: Republican

Thomas J. Herlihy Jr. (November 29, 1956 – May 8, 2015) was an American politician and businessman. Herlihy, a Republican, was a resident of Simsbury, Connecticut. He was sworn in as a member of Simsbury's Board of Selectmen on December 7, 2009. Herlihy was the State Senator for the 8th Senatorial District from 1999 to 2009, representing the northwest suburbs of Hartford in the Farmington Valley and Litchfield County in the Connecticut Senate, including the towns of Avon, Barkhamsted, Canton, Colebrook, Granby, Hartland, Harwinton, New Hartford, Norfolk, Simsbury, and Torrington.

== Biography ==
Herlihy was born in Queens, New York and received a B.S. in Education from the University of Hartford. He taught in the Simsbury School District and then worked in the insurance business. In 1983, he started his insurance business in Simsbury: the T. J. Herlihy Insurance. From 1987 to 1990, Herlihy was on Simsbury's Board of Selectmen. In 1991, he was elected to the Board of Finance and served as chairman in 1996. In 1997, he became the State Representative for the 16th Assembly District, a position he held until his election to the Senate. While at the General Assembly, Senator Herlihy was honored by the Connecticut State Firefighters Association for spearheading efforts to provide thermal imaging equipment for fire departments throughout Connecticut. After retiring from the Senate after five terms, Herlihy was once again re-elected to the Board of Selectmen on November 3, 2009. Herlihy died on May 8, 2015.

Connecticut House of Representatives
| Preceded by Paul Knierim | Connecticut state representative from the Sixteenth District; 1997–1999 | Succeeded by Robert Heagney |
Connecticut State Senate
| Preceded by James Fleming | Connecticut Senator from the Eighth District; 1999–2009 | Succeeded by Kevin Witkos |
Political offices
| Preceded by Richard Hogan | Simsbury Selectman; 2009–2010 | Succeeded by Nancy Haase |
