= Melissa Osborne =

American politician

Member of the Connecticut House of Representatives from the 16th district
- Incumbent
- Assumed office 2023
- Preceded by: John Hampton

Personal details
- Born: 1967 (age 58–59)
- Party: Democratic
- Education: Hunter College (BS); New York Law School (JD)
- Occupation: Divorce and Family Law Attorney
- Website: https://meolaw.com/

Melissa Osborne (born 1967) is a practicing Divorce and Family Law attorney in Hartford County, Connecticut, and an American Democratic Party politician currently serving as a member of the Connecticut House of Representatives from the 16th district, which encompasses the town of Simsbury, since 2023. Osborne was first elected in 2022 over Republican challenger Mike Paine by 1,500 votes, and was re-elected in 2024, winning by 3,724 votes, with 61.85% of the electorate. Osborne had previously run against, and lost to, Republican incumbent Kevin Witkos for State Senate in 2014, 2018, and 2020.
