= Paul Honig =

American politician (born 1962/1963)

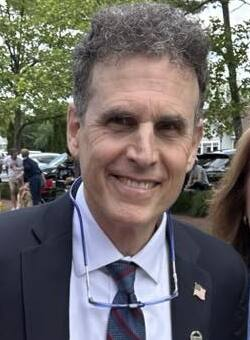
- Honig in 2025

Member of the Connecticut State Senate from the 8th district
- Incumbent
- Assumed office January 8, 2025
- Preceded by: Lisa Seminara

Personal details
- Born: 1962 or 1963 (age 62–63) New York, U.S.
- Party: Democratic
- Spouse: Diane
- Children: 2
- Education: University of Pennsylvania (BSE, BAS)

Paul Honig (born 1962 or 1963) is an American politician who is a member of the Connecticut State Senate, representing the 8th district since 2025.

== Early life and education ==
Honig was born and raised on Long Island. His mother was an art teacher, and his father a lawyer and Korean War veteran. He graduated from the University of Pennsylvania with a bachelor's degree in computer science and finance.

== Career ==
After graduation, Honig spent 22 years working in fixed income finance in New York City, and ultimately rose to the level of managing director at JPMorgan Chase. After retiring, he relocated to Connecticut to teach math for a year, later becoming a tutor and coaching varsity tennis.

In 2019, Honig was elected to the board of selectmen of Harwinton, Connecticut. In 2022, he ran to represent the 8th district of the Connecticut State Senate, in which he sought to replace the retiring Kevin Witkos, losing to Republican Lisa Seminara by a mere 124 votes. In 2024, he again faced Seminara in a rematch. Due to the close margin of the race, a recount was ordered, which ultimately affirmed Honig's win. According to Honig, he is the first Democrat in 50 years to be elected to represent the district.

== Personal life ==
Since 2012, Honig has lived in Harwinton, Connecticut, with his wife, Diane, and their two sons.

== Electoral history ==
2022 Connecticut's 8th State Senate district election
| Party | Candidate | Votes | % | ±% |
|---|---|---|---|---|
| Republican | Lisa Seminara | 22,954 | 50.14% | −1.40% |
| Democratic | Paul Honig | 22,830 | 49.86% | +3.33% |
| Total votes | | 45,784 | 100.0% | |
| Republican hold | | | | |

2024 Connecticut's 8th State Senate district election
| Party | Candidate | Votes | % | ±% |
|---|---|---|---|---|
| Democratic | Paul Honig | 28,940 | 50.28% | +0.42% |
| Republican | Lisa Seminara (incumbent) | 28,621 | 49.72% | −0.42% |
| Total votes | | 57,561 | 100.0% | |
| Democratic gain from Republican | | | | |
