= Pankaj Jain =

University professor

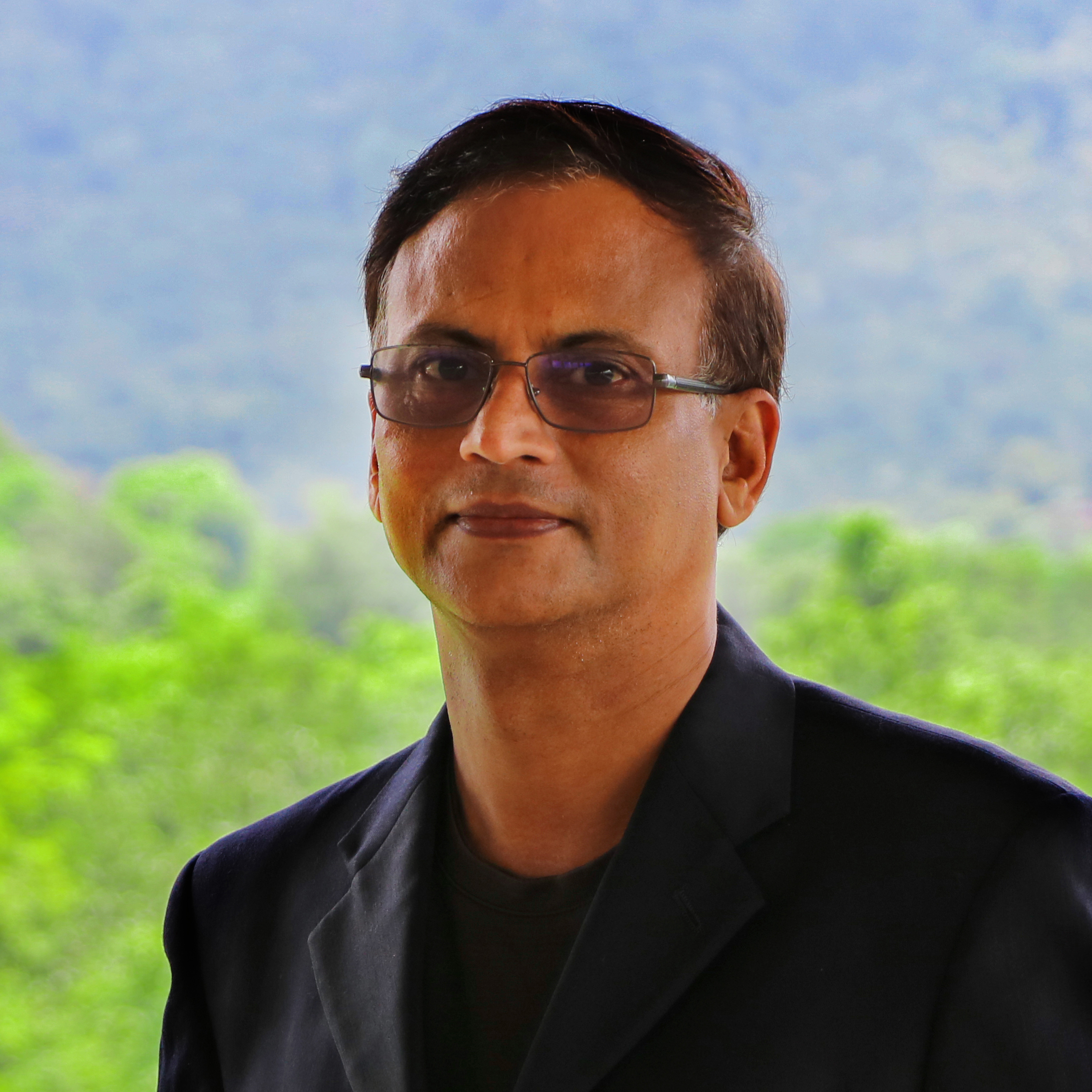
- Born: 1970 (age 55–56); Pali, Rajasthan, India
- Occupation: Professor

Academic background
- Education: Karnatak University (B.E. 1992) Columbia University (M.A. 2003) University of Iowa (Ph.D. 2008)

Academic work
- Discipline: Religious Studies, Film Studies, Jain Studies, Sustainability, Diaspora Studies
- Institutions: FLAME University, University of North Texas, North Carolina State University, Rutgers University

Pankaj Jain (born 1970 in Pali, Rajasthan) is a Professor of Philosophy, Religious Studies, Film Studies, Sustainability, and Diaspora Studies. He is the Director of The India Centre and the Head of the Department of Humanities and Languages at FLAME University. He has authored or edited eight books, including the Hinduism Section of the Encyclopedia of Indian Religions and another volume on Philosophy of Religion. His articles have appeared in multiple academic journals and popular websites.

== Education and career ==
Jain graduated with a Bachelor of Engineering in Computer Science from Karnatak University in 1992 and began teaching at the M.B.M. Engineering College, Jodhpur. He moved to the US in 1996. After working as an IT professional for a few years, he joined Columbia University in 2002 to pursue M.A. in Indian Religions. In 2008, he received a Ph.D. from the University of Iowa in Indian Religions and Ecology.

In 2007, he taught Sanskrit, Hindi, and Hinduism at Rutgers University for a year. From 2008 to 2010, he taught at North Carolina State University. In 2010 he joined the Department of Philosophy and Religion and Department of Anthropology at the University of North Texas. He has been a research affiliate at the Pluralism Project by Harvard University, the first Hindu-Jain scholar-in-residence at GreenFaith, an American interfaith environmental coalition, and the India representative for the International Society for Environmental Ethics.

He convened the first Indic Studies conference in collaboration with the Indian Institute of Advanced Study in May 2021. In 2025, he co-organized the first symposium on the academic study of religion in collaboration with Wellesley College. Two of his online courses are available on SWAYAM. The first is on Jainism and the second is on Asian Philosophical and Religious Traditions.

== Works ==
Monographs:

1. Dharma and Ecology of Hindu Communities: Sustenance and Sustainability (Routledge, 2011)
  - Reviews -
2. Science and Socio-Religious Revolution in India: Moving the Mountains (Routledge, 2018)
  - Reviews -
3. Dharma in America: A Short History of Hindu-Jain Diaspora (Routledge, 2020)
  - Reviews -
4. Modern Jainism: A Historical Approach (Springer, 2023)
5. Visual Anthropology of Indian Films: Religious Communities and Cultural Traditions in Bollywood and Beyond (Routledge, 2024)
6. Jainism: From Bhagwan Mahavira to Mahatma Gandhi. (Manohar, 2025)

Edited volumes:

1. Encyclopedia of Indian Religions- Hinduism and Tribal Religions (Springer, 2022)
2. Indian and Western Philosophical Concepts in Religion (Bloomsbury, 2023)
3. Reframing Indic Studies: Beyond the Imperialism of Categories (Manohar, 2026)

Articles:

- Essays in the Journal of Visual Anthropology
- Essays in Worldviews: Religion, Culture, and Ecology
- Essay on Climate Engineering from Hindu-Jain Perspectives in Zygon: Journal of Religion and Science
- Articles in the Times of India

SWAYAM MOOCs:

- Introduction to Jainism
- Asian Religions

== Awards and recognitions ==
Jain's first book was selected for the DANAM Book Prize and Uberoi Foundation Award. He is a recipient of the Fulbright-Nehru International Fellowship for Environmental Leadership, IIAS Fellowship, and Wenner-Gren Grant. In addition, he was nominated for the Sustainability Leadership Award from Memnosyne Institute. He is on the editorial boards of the journals Worldviews (Brill) and Religions (MDPI). He also serves on the advisory boards for Yale University's Forum on Religion and Ecology, the Interfaith Centre for Sustainable Development, Texas Ayurveda Professionals Association, Educators' Society for Heritage of India, and Indus International Research Foundation.
