= Sujata Gadkar-Wilcox =

American politician

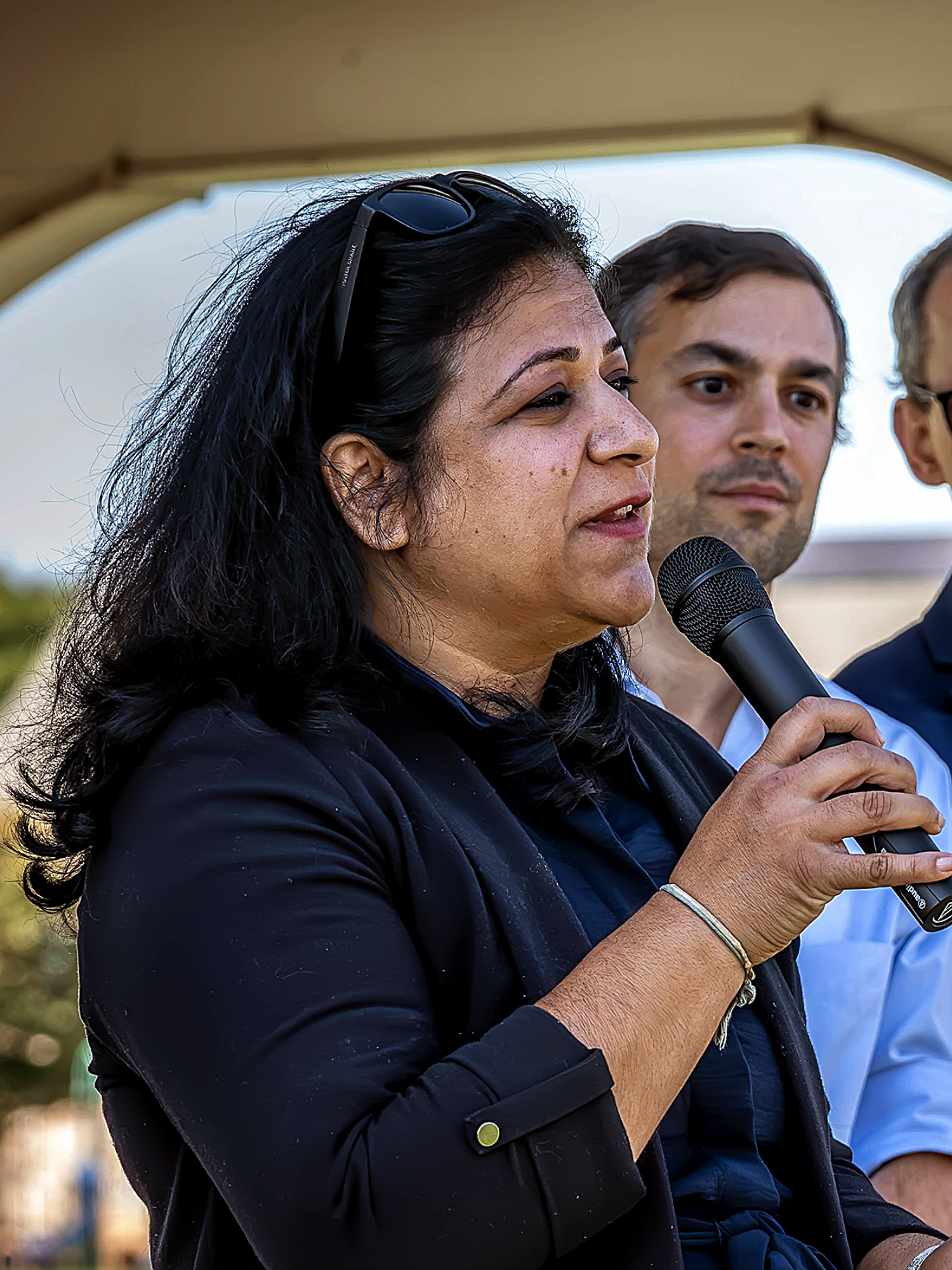

Member of the Connecticut State Senate from the 22nd district
- Incumbent
- Assumed office January 21, 2025
- Preceded by: Marilyn Moore

Personal details
- Born: 1979 (age 46–47)
- Party: Democratic Party
- Education: Cornell University (BA); The New School (MA); University of Pennsylvania (JD)
- Website: Official website

Sujata Gadkar-Wilcox is an American politician and member of the Connecticut Senate since 2024 from the 22nd district.

She is Professor of Legal Studies at Quinnipiac University. She was a Fulbright-Nehru scholar studying constitutional values in India.
