= Navrachana University =

Private university in Gujarat, India

- નવરચના યુનિવર્સિટી
- Motto: Education beyond books, for the world beyond what it looks
- Type: Private
- Established: July 2009
- Accreditation: UGC NAAC A Grade
- Chairperson: Tejal Amin
- Chancellor: Rahul Amin
- Vice-Chancellor: Prof. Pratyush Shankar
- Provost: Prof. Pratyush Shankar
- Location: Vasna Bhayli Road, Vadodara, Gujarat, 391410, India
- Campus: 5.318 acres (2.152 ha); Urban
- Website: www.nuv.ac.in

Navrachana University is a private university in Vadodara, Gujarat. It was created by the state of Gujarat under the Private University Act, 2009.

== Schools ==
School of Liberal Studies and Education offers: BA-Journalism & Mass Communication, BA-Humanities and Social Sciences, BEd and PhD.

School of Science offers: BSc(Chemistry, Botany & Plant Biotechnology, Zoology & Animal Biotechnology, Microbiology), BSc-MSc Integrated(Biomedical), MSc(Chemistry), MSc(Microbiology), MSc(Zoology & Biotechnology), MSc(Botany & Biotechnology) and MSc(Clinical Embryology).

School of Environmental Design and Architecture offers: Bachelor of Architecture, Bachelor of Design (Interior), Bachelor of Design (Product Design and Visual Communication) and Master of Planning(Urban & Regional Planning).

School of Engineering and Technology offers: BCA, BSc(Data Science), Bachelor of Technology (Mechanical, Electrical & Electronics, Civil, Aerospace, Biotechnology and Computer Science and Engineering) and MTech (Structural Engineering, Robotics & Automation, CSE).

School of Business and Law offers: BBA, BBA-Business Analytics, BBA-LLB, LLB, LLM, MBA and Executive MBA.

All educational programs follow modular, semester-wise curricula and allow taking courses that cut across program boundaries. The unitary character allows the university to offer educational and pedagogic models grounded in interdisciplinary thinking and use shared infrastructural and educational resources.

== Activities ==
- The university has introduced a choice-based curriculum to promote interdisciplinary and multidisciplinary learning among students.
- A Startup affiliated with Navrachana University was granted a funding of Rs 15 lakh by the central government.
- Provost Prof. Pratyush Shankar of Navrachana University led the Humboldt Residency Program in Germany for the year 2023.
- Navrachana University received an A grade with a CGPA of 3.31 in its first cycle of accreditation by the National Assessment and Accreditation Council (NAAC).
- In 2024 Professor Sandeep Vasant, registrar at Navrachana University, was awarded the Fulbright-Nehru International Fellowship. He is among ten scholars from India chosen for this prestigious recognition, focusing on advancing student-centric approaches and international collaboration in higher education.
- Navrachana University's research highlighted alarming levels of silent toxins in Gujarat's lifelines. Navrachana University's (NUV) School of Science detected worrying levels of contaminants in river water, sediment, and fish tissues.
- International conference on law, ethics, and policymaking in healthcare, which brought together academicians, jurists, and healthcare professionals to discuss issues such as bioethics, patient rights, mental health, medical negligence, and data privacy.
- International Conference on Resilience (ICR 2026) brought together researchers and practitioners to discuss urban sustainability and community resilience, including studies on ecological degradation in Vadodara's lakes and Rivers etc.
- AlgAI is a research initiative under the Centre for Interdisciplinary and Computational Sciences (CICS) that emphasizes industry collaboration and applied interdisciplinary research in artificial intelligence and biological systems to address environmental challenges.
- History of Urban Form of India, a book by Professor Pratyush Shankar, Provost of Navrachana University, has been presented through lectures and academic discussions at institutions including the University of Cambridge, Sciences Po (Paris), RWTH Aachen University, and the University of Bonn. The book was published by Oxford University Press.
- Indian cartography blended mathematical astronomy, artistic expression, and practical navigation. Dr. Samira Sheikh (Vanderbilt University; Obaid Siddique Chair, NCBS Bengaluru) explored this at the inaugural Parekh Lecture Series honouring Lord Bhikhu Parekh.
- Professor Pratyush Shankar appointed as Urban Design Expert by the Government of Gujarat, to Vadodara Heritage Conservation Committee.
- Dr. Meenesh Shah, Chairman & MD, NDDB, inaugurates the Centre for Public Health at Navrachana university.
