= Senator Fasano =

Senator Fasano may refer to:

- Len Fasano (born 1958), Connecticut State Senate
- Mike Fasano (born 1958), Florida State Senate
