= Virginia Connolly =

American politician (1914–1984)

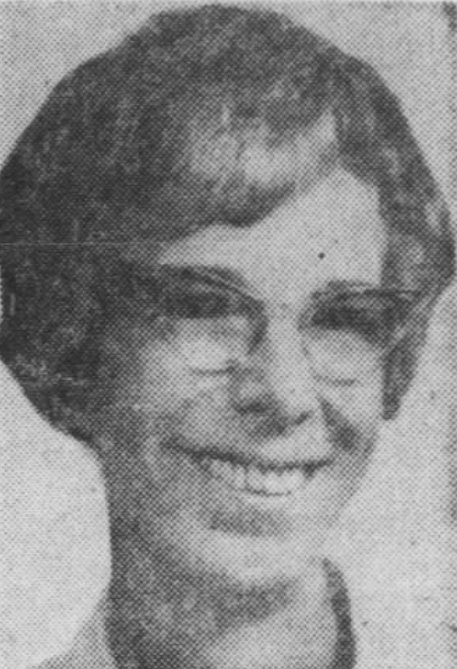

Member of the Connecticut House of Representatives from the 39th district
- In office 1971–1973
- Preceded by: Russell L. Stecker
- Succeeded by: Paul H. Sullivan

Member of the Connecticut House of Representatives from the 16th district
- In office 1973–1981
- Preceded by: George W. Hannon Jr.
- Succeeded by: James T. Fleming

Personal details
- Born: Virginia M. Straughan; June 25, 1914 Manchester, Connecticut, U.S.
- Died: August 14, 1984 (aged 70) West Simsbury, Connecticut, U.S.
- Party: Republican
- Spouse: James Cyril Connolly
- Children: 2
- Education: St. Joseph College (B.S.)

Virginia M. Connolly (née Straughan; June 25, 1914 – August 14, 1984) was an American Republican politician who served in the Connecticut House of Representatives. From 1971 to 1973, she represented the 39th district, and from 1973 to 1981, the 16th district.

== Personal life and education ==
Connolly was born Virginia M. Straughan on June 25, 1914, in Manchester, Connecticut. Connolly graduated from Hartford Hospital's School of Nursing in 1932 and from St. Joseph College in 1951, where she earned a bachelor's degree in biology. She performed postgraduate research on public health and administration at Harvard University. She was married to James Cyril Connolly, and together they had two children.

Outside of her political career, Connolly worked as a school nurse, a staff nurse for the Hartford Visiting Nursing Association, and in the surgical department of Hartford Hospital. She served as an interim director of the Hartford branch of the American Cancer Society, on the advisory boards of the Robert Wood Johnson Foundation and the University of Connecticut School of Medicine, and on the Connecticut Easterseals Board of Directors.

== Political career ==
Connolly was first elected to the Connecticut House of Representatives in 1970 and served one term representing the 39th district as a Republican. In 1972, Connecticut redistricted, and when Connolly ran for reelection, it was to the 16th district. She was elected, defeating Democratic candidate D. Michael Hurley, and served four terms. She did not run for reelection in 1980 and was succeeded by fellow Republican James T. Fleming.

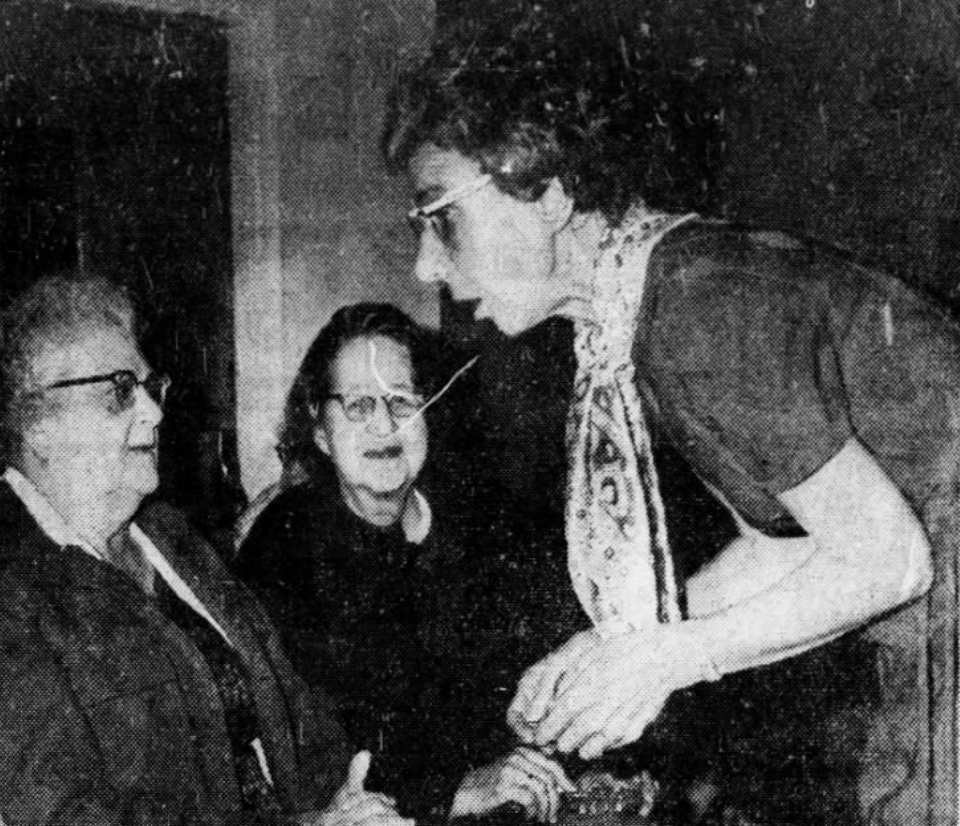
Connolly speaking with constituents in 1971

In May 1972, Connolly and fellow Republican Ruth H. Clark argued against a measure in the Connecticut General Assembly that allowed abortion "only when the life of the expectant mother was threatened." The measure was passed, but Connecticut's abortion statutes were ruled unconstitutional by a federal district court in September 1972.

While serving in the House of Representatives, Connolly was a member of the Public Health and Safety Committee, and for two years, she served as its chairwoman. In 1972, Connolly was appointed by Connecticut Governor Thomas J. Meskill to lead a statewide task force on addressing venereal disease in Connecticut, in particular a surge in gonnorhea and syphilis. At the time, both New Haven and Hartford, Connecticut, were among the ten cities in the United States with the highest incidence rates of venereal disease.

== Death ==
Connolly died on August 14, 1984, in West Simsbury, Connecticut. She was 70.

== Legacy ==
In 1990, Simsbury, Connecticut's housing authority established the Virginia Connolly Residence, a congregate and assisted living community named in honor of Connolly's work in public health as a legislator.
