= Connecticut's 8th State Senate district =

American legislative district

Senator
Paul Honig; D–Harwinton

Connecticut's 8th State Senate district elects one member of the Connecticut State Senate. Its current senator is Democrat Paul Honig, who was first elected in 2024. The district contains the towns of Norfolk, Hartland, Canton, Simsbury, New Hartford, Avon, Barkhamsted, Colebrook and parts of Granby, Harwinton and Torrington.

== List of senators ==
Senator	Party	Years	District home	Note
Paul J. Falsey	Democratic	1959 – 1967	New Haven	Did not run for reelection
Wallace Barnes	Republican	1967 – 1971	Bristol	Did not run for reelection
Lewis B. Rome	Republican	1971 – 1979	Bloomfield	Did not run for reelection
Russell L. Post Jr.	Republican	1979 – 1983	Canton	Did not run for reelection
Reginald J. Smith Jr.	Republican	1983 – 1991	New Hartford	Did not run for reelection
James T. Fleming	Republican	1991 – 1999	Simsbury	Did not run for reelection
Thomas J. Herlihy	Republican	1999 – 2009	Simsbury	Did not run for reelection
Kevin Witkos	Republican	2009 – 2023	Canton	Did not run for reelection
Lisa Seminara	Republican	2023 – 2025	Avon	Defeated for reelection
Paul Honig	Democratic	2025 – present	Harwinton	Incumbent
