= Jason Skinner House =

Historic house in Connecticut, United States

- U.S. National Register of Historic Places
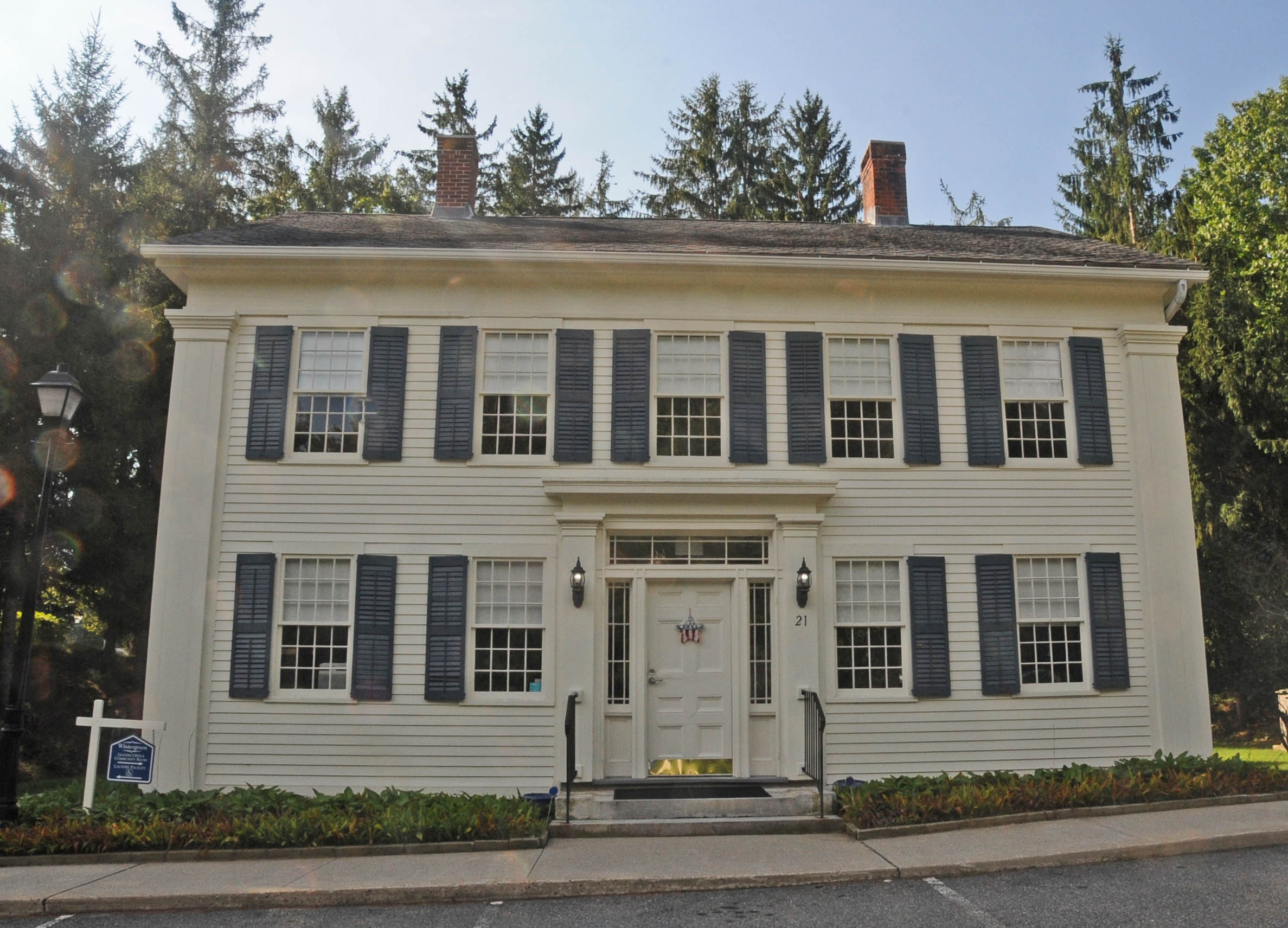

- Location within Connecticut Location within the United States
- Location: 21 Wintergreen Circle, Harwinton, Connecticut
- Coordinates: 41°45′58″N 73°4′15″W
- Area: less than one acre
- Built: 1845
- Architectural style: Greek Revival
- NRHP reference No.: 85001331
- Added to NRHP: June 19, 1985

The Jason Skinner House is a historic house at 21 Wintergreen Circle in Harwinton, Connecticut. Built around 1845, it is a well-preserved local example of a vernacular Greek Revival farmhouse. Originally located in a rural setting, it was disassembled and moved to its present location near the town offices in 1985. It was listed on the National Register of Historic Places in 1985.

== Description and history ==
The Jason Skinner House stands on the south side of Wintergreen Circle, a loop of public housing adjacent to the municipal office and library complex in central Harwinton. It is a 2 1/2-story wood-frame structure, with a side-gable roof, interior brick chimneys, and a clapboarded exterior. It has wide corner pilasters rising to an entablature. The main facade is five bays wide, with a center entrance flanked by sidelight windows and pilasters, and topped by a transom window and cornice. The interior rooms retain the original woodwork and much of its historical appearance.

The house was built sometime in the mid-1840s by Jason Skinner, a prosperous local farmer. It was located on the eastern shore of Valley View Pond, a rural setting south of its present location. In 1985, it was carefully disassembled and moved to its current location. Some of its deteriorated and vandalized elements were replaced with reproductions, and the 20th-century interior elements were modernized. The house now serves as the office of the local public housing authority.

== See also ==
- National Register of Historic Places listings in Litchfield County, Connecticut
