= Burlington–Harmony Hill Roads Historic District =

Historic district in Connecticut, United States

- U.S. National Register of Historic Places
- U.S. Historic district
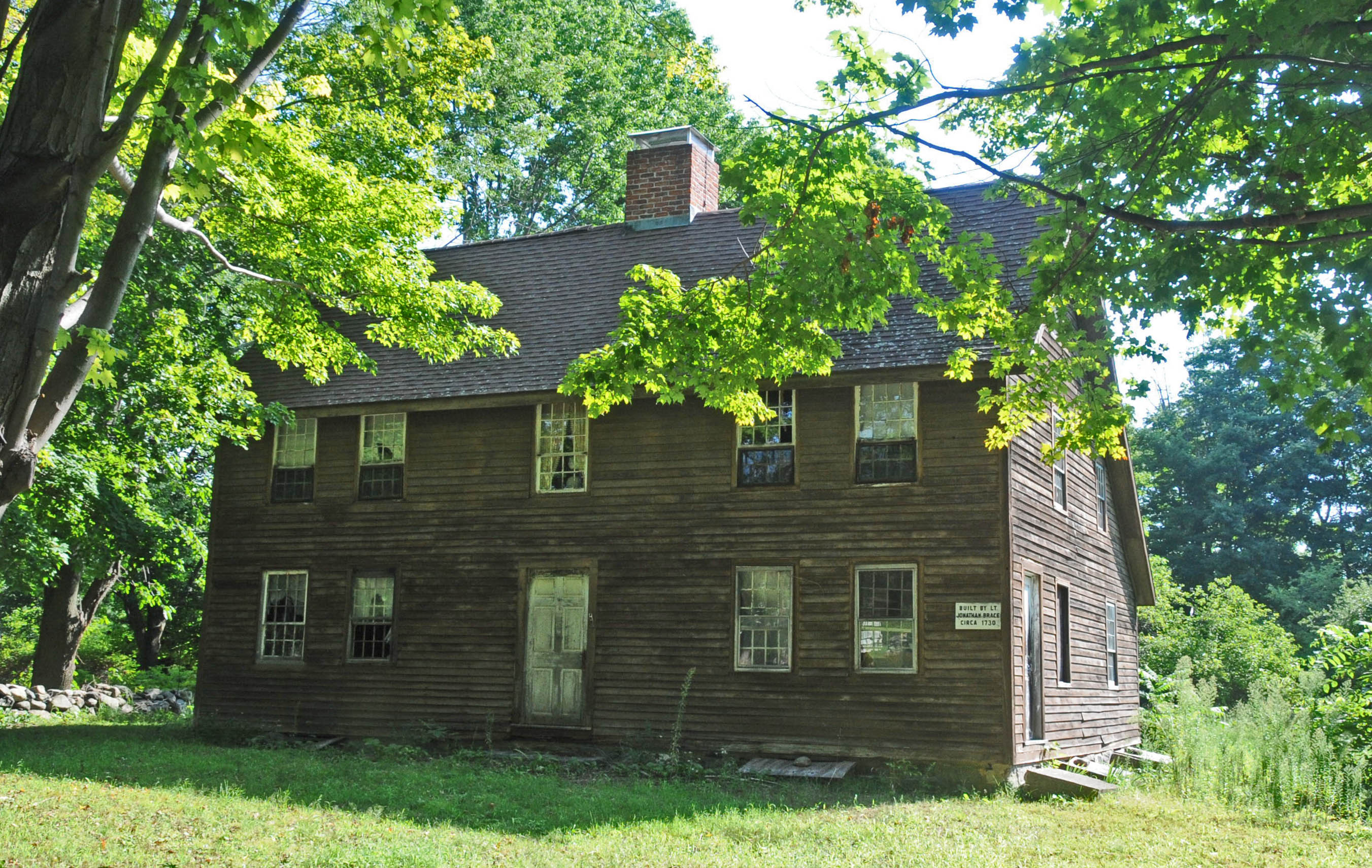

- Location within Connecticut Location within the United States
- Location: Harmony Hill, Locust Grove, and Burlington Roads, Harwinton, Connecticut
- Coordinates: 41°46′33″N 73°2′56″W
- Area: 103 acres (42 ha)
- Architect: multiple
- Architectural style: Colonial Revival, Queen Anne, Georgian
- NRHP reference No.: 96001364
- Added to NRHP: December 6, 1996

The Burlington–Harmony Hill Roads Historic District encompasses a historic rural agricultural crossroads village in eastern Harwinton, Connecticut. Stretching mainly along Harmony Hill Road North of its Junction with Burlington Road, it includes residential buildings dating from the mid-18th to late 19th centuries. The district was listed on the National Register of Historic Places in 1996.

== Description and history ==
The town of Harwinton was established in 1737 from land formerly part of Hartford and Windsor. Burlington Road, now Connecticut Route 4, was then as now the main road between Farmington and Litchfield. The Junction with Harmony Hill Road and Locust Road, east of the village center, formed as a small community center known as Catlin's Corners, named for Abraham Catlin, the first settler to the area who also operated a small shop. Instead of dispersed farmsteads, the area grew with houses stretched along Harmony Hill Road North of the Junction, with six houses built before the turn of the 19th century, and a school was added at the Northeast corner of the Junction in the late 18th century.

The historic district is linear, extending from a farmstead on the east side of Locust Street a short way south of the main intersection to a group of three 18th-century houses on the west side of Harmony Hill Road north of the junction. The district's properties are well spaced, and a range in sizes up to 20 acres (8.1 ha). The district as a whole is 103 acres (42 ha) in size. Houses are typically 2-1/2 stories in height, and of wood frame construction. The oldest is that of Jonathan Brace, built about 1730; other houses included two that have been converted from 19th-century barns, and one that was adapted from the 18th-century school building in the 19th century. Two 18th-century houses built by Abraham Catlin's son Abijah define the main intersection.

== See also ==
- National Register of Historic Places listings in Litchfield County, Connecticut
