= Lisa Seminara =

American politician

Member of the Connecticut Senate from the 8th district
- In office January 4, 2023 – January 8, 2025
- Preceded by: Kevin Witkos
- Succeeded by: Paul Honig

Personal details
- Born: Lisa Ann Spalvieri; October 29, 1968 (age 57) Harrison, New York, U.S.
- Party: Republican
- Spouse: Nick Seminara
- Education: St. John's University; Columbia University

Lisa Seminara is American politician from the state of Connecticut. She was the senator for the 8th Senate District from 2023 to 2025 and is a member of the Republican Party. She was elected in November 2022, and was defeated for re-election in November 2024 by Paul Honig.

Seminara is a social worker by profession.

Prior to her election to the state Senate, she was a member of the Avon School Board.
