= Marilyn Moore (politician) =

American politician

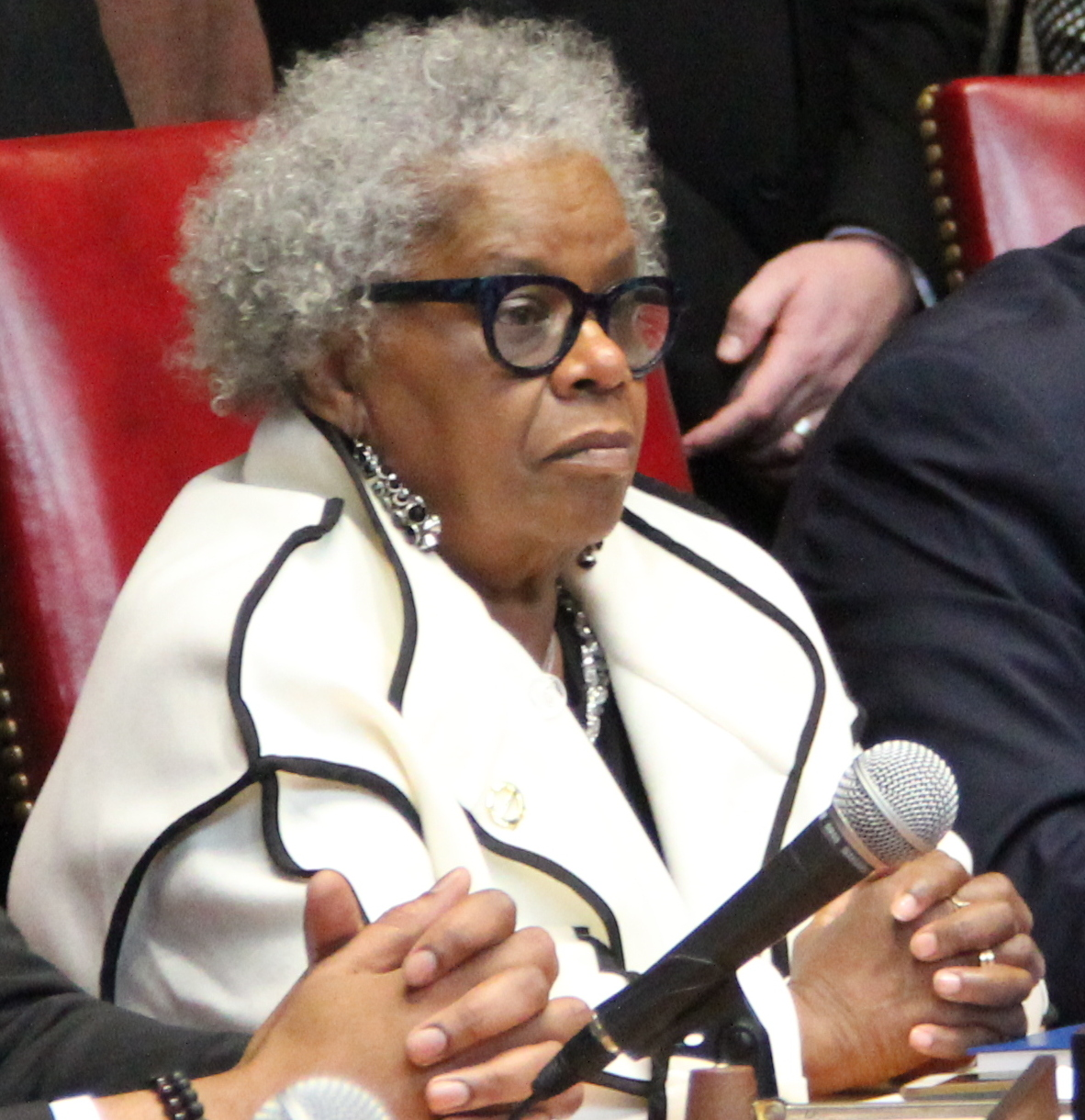
- Moore in 2023

Member of the Connecticut State Senate from the 22nd district
- In office January 7, 2015 – January 8, 2025
- Preceded by: Anthony Musto
- Succeeded by: Sujata Gadkar-Wilcox

Personal details
- Born: November 13, 1948 (age 77) Bridgeport, Connecticut, U.S.
- Party: Democratic

Marilyn Moore (born November 13, 1948) is an American politician who served in the Connecticut State Senate from the 22nd district from 2015 to 2025.
