= John P. McKinney =

American politician (born 1964)

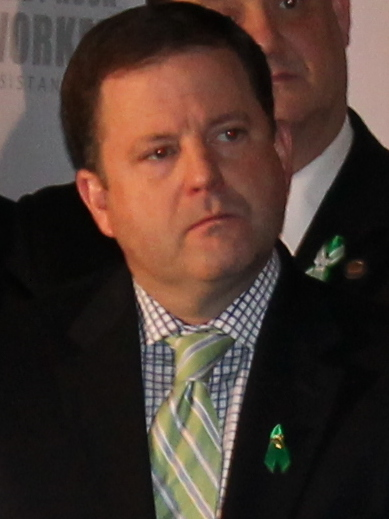
- McKinney in 2013

Minority Leader of the Connecticut Senate
- In office June 2007 – 2015
- Preceded by: Louis DeLuca
- Succeeded by: Len Fasano

Member of the Connecticut Senate from the 28th district
- In office 1999–2015
- Preceded by: Fred Lovegrove
- Succeeded by: Tony Hwang
- Constituency: represented Easton, Fairfield, Newtown, Weston (part), and Westport (part)

Personal details
- Born: March 6, 1964 (age 62) Fairfield, Connecticut, U.S.
- Party: Republican
- Children: 3
- Education: Yale University (BA); University of Connecticut (JD)

John P. McKinney (born March 6, 1964) is a former Republican member of the Connecticut Senate, representing the 28th district from 1999 until 2015, and served as its Minority Leader from June 2007 until 2014. He was a candidate for governor in 2014, receiving enough delegates during the convention to qualify for an August primary. McKinney's 2014 campaign was particularly focused on reducing the size of government, decreasing tax burden, and growing the economy. He was defeated in the 2014 Republican primary by Tom Foley.

He was succeeded as Connecticut Senate Minority Leader by Len Fasano.

McKinney considered running for Congress in 2010 in Connecticut's 4th congressional district against incumbent Democratic Congressman Jim Himes.

McKinney is the son of Stewart B. McKinney, a former Congressman for the Fourth Congressional District in Connecticut. He is also the grandson of Briggs Cunningham.

McKinney is currently out of politics and practices law in Fairfield, Connecticut.
