= Luman Watson =

Luman Watson was an early Cincinnati clockmaker. He worked in Cincinnati, Ohio from 1819 to 1834. His clocks had wooden works. He made both tall clocks and shelf clocks.

Luman Watson, son and grandson of prosperous farmers, was born at Harwinton, Connecticut, on October 10, 1790. He spent his boyhood in the center of Connecticut's clock making country, and between chores on the farm probably slipped away to follow his natural bent for mechanics. By the time he was nineteen years old, Watson had moved to Cincinnati and established the clock making partnership of Read and Watson with the Read brothers, Abner, Ezra, and Amassa. The sale of a Read and Watson clock is recorded as early as 1809 in Clark County, Ohio.

At that time there was a severe shortage of brass, American manufacturers used hardwood for making clock movements. This proved to be an adequate substitute for short duration clocks. Wheels had to have large teeth for strength so a running time of more than 30 hours was not possible.

By the 1820s eighteen workmen were employed producing first wooden and, after 1830, brass shelf clocks. The opening of the Erie Canal in 1825 however also opened the door to great numbers of cheaper Connecticut made clocks which by the time of Watson’s death had put an end to Ohio clockmaking. The Watson firm was prolific. It is estimated that between 1815 and 1834, more than 30,000 tall case clocks were manufactured. This figure is staggering considering that after about 1820 tall case clocks began to fall out of favor. By about 1830, the firm had begun making many clocks designed to sit on a mantel or special shelf.

Hiram Powers was an assistant to Luman Watson, Powers was “skilled in modelling figures... he went on to become one of America’s first great sculptors.”

Luman Watson and J. Bonsall were founders of the Ohio Mechanics Institute in 1828.

Watson died in Cincinnati November 28, 1834.

A Luman Watson tall case clock is on display in the Cincinnati Art Museum Cincinnati Wing and in the Old State Capitol in Iowa.
