= Robert W. Heagney =

American politician

Robert Heagney

Member of the Connecticut House of Representatives from the 16th district
- In office 1999–2007
- Preceded by: Thomas Herlihy
- Succeeded by: Linda Schofield

Personal details
- Party: Republican

Robert W. Heagney is an American lawyer and politician who served in the Connecticut House of Representatives from 1999 to 2007, representing the 16th district as a Republican.

== Personal life ==
After graduating from Simsbury High School, Heagney earned a Bachelor of Arts degree from Saint Anselm College in 1975 and later received his Juris Doctor from the University of Bridgeport School of Law, now Quinnipiac University, in 1980.

Heagney lives in Simsbury with his wife Barbara and four children: Walker, Kathleen, Emmet, and Addison.

== Connecticut House of Representatives ==
=== Electoral history ===
Heagney served as a Republican representative for four terms from 1999-2007. In the 2006 election, he was defeated by Democrat Linda Schofield.

=== Legislation ===
Heagney's legislative record includes, in 1999 and 2000, an increase in state aid for the town of Simsbury - representing the most significant increase in state funding for Simsbury in over a decade.

As a member of the Education Committee, Heagney helped pass a bill that permanently bans anyone convicted of a serious felony from teaching in Connecticut and fought for expediting special education reimbursement for excess or unforeseen costs.

In 2003, Heagney introduced legislation that requires the state's community-technical colleges, Connecticut State University System, and the University of Connecticut to allow members of the armed services that are called into active duty during the school year to take the classes they paid for without additional charges upon their return. The measure prevents reservists and full-time members of the armed services, who have already paid tuition costs to state colleges and universities, from losing the funds they have paid to those schools once they have been called to serve the country.

In addition, Heagney has voted for $500 million in tax relief for families and businesses, enhanced funding of the state's open space acquisition program, and lead local opposition to the purchase of Village Water by the Bridgeport Hydraulic Company.

=== Positions in administration ===
He served as the Ranking Member of the Education Committee (2000–2004).

For the 2005-07 legislative sessions, his fourth term in office, he was Minority Whip of the Republican grouping and a member of the General Assembly’s Education, Higher Education, and Banks committees.

== Other public roles ==
He was a hearing officer for the state’s Commission on Human Rights & Opportunities from 1985–99, and was selected to serve on the Secretary of State’s Task Force on Citizenship Subcommittee from 1990-1994.

He was elected to Simsbury’s Board of Finance in 1993. Heagney was appointed Chairman in 1996, and served in that manner until being elected to the Connecticut General Assembly in 1998. Serving as a Simsbury Selectman from 1989–1993, Heagney additionally served on various boards including the Simsbury Affordable Housing Partnership Board from 1988 to 1997; the Simsbury Affordable Housing Coalition from 1988–1990; the Simsbury Planning Commission from 1987–1989; and the Simsbury Republican Town Committee from 1987-2005.

== Law career ==
Heagney is admitted to practice before the courts of the State of Connecticut, the U.S. Second District Court of Appeals. He was General Counsel at Wellington underwriting, Inc in Hartford. He was before that a partner with Gilman & Marks, an East Hartford law firm, and was also a partner with Austin & Heagney from 1980-1984.

== Leisure and voluntary work ==
He is the past president of the Simsbury Little League, a post he served in for nine years, and has held other volunteer leadership posts including Vice-President of the Board of Directors of Simsbury’s "A Better Chance". The Heagney family also served as a "Host Family" for an ABC Student.
