= Litchfield–South Roads Historic District =

Historic district in Connecticut, United States

- U.S. National Register of Historic Places
- U.S. Historic district
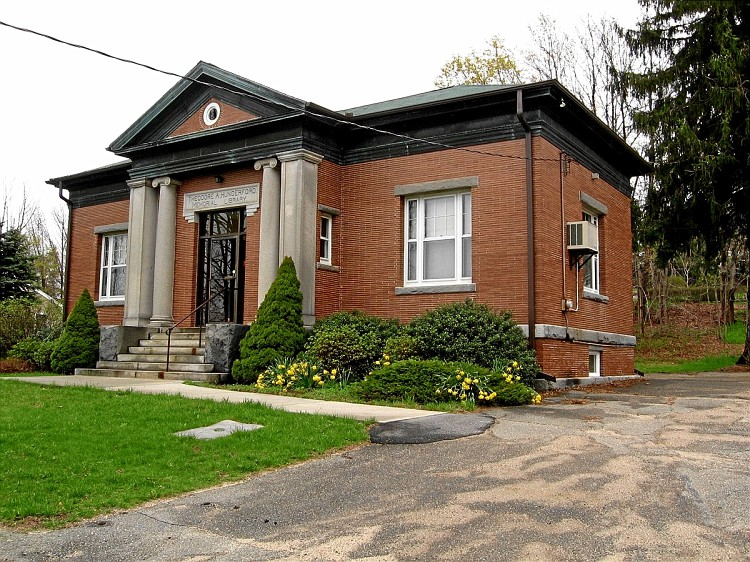
- Hungerford Memorial Library

- Location within Connecticut Location within the United States
- Location: Roughly, Litchfield Road from Bridge Park to Harwinton Heights Roads and South Road from Litchfield Road to South Cemetery, Harwinton, Connecticut
- Coordinates: 41°46′15″N 73°3′38″W
- Area: 93 acres (38 ha)
- Architect: Belkap & Webb; Dana, Richard Henry, et al
- Architectural style: Colonial, Federal, Greek Revival
- NRHP reference No.: 96001365
- Added to NRHP: December 6, 1996

The Litchfield–South Roads Historic District encompasses part of the traditional town center of Harwinton, Connecticut. Settled in the second quarter of the 18th century, and centered at the junction of Connecticut Route 4 with North and South Roads, the town center includes a variety of mainly 19th century residential architecture, several churches, and municipal buildings. It was listed on the National Register of Historic Places in 1996.

== Description and history ==
The town of Harwinton was first settled in 1737, out of lands previously assigned to Hartford and Windsor. The town center arose on what is now Route 4, the main east-west route between Hartford and Litchfield, where it crosses a significant local north–south route (now North and South Roads). The town remained agricultural through the 19th century, its economy not industrialized due to a lack of railroad connections and suitable water resources. In the early 20th century, it joined the trend of other communities in northwestern Connecticut in the rise of second homes for city dwellers. One of these, William McConway of Pittsburgh, Pennsylvania, had a series of fine quarry-stone walls built along South Road.

The historic district is roughly T-shaped, extending along Route 4 (Litchfield Road west of the main junction, Burlington Road east of it) between Birge Park Road and Harwinton Heights Road. It extends south on South Road to Village Lane. Most of its buildings are residential, set with ample spacing and setback from the roads. There are four churches in the district, as well as the site of the town's first cemetery and meetinghouse; the latter was set directly in the central junction. Most of the buildings in the district date to the 19th century, although the Classical Revival library is early 20th century, and the Congregational Church is a simplified recreation of an 1808 sanctuary which burned in 1949. The only significant modern buildings are associated with the Roman Catholic church complex at the western end of the district.

== See also ==
- National Register of Historic Places listings in Litchfield County, Connecticut
