= Paul Knierim =

American politician

Member of the Connecticut House of Representatives from the 16th district
- In office January 9, 1991 – January 8, 1997
- Preceded by: James T. Fleming
- Succeeded by: Thomas Herlihy

Personal details
- Born: March 27, 1965 (age 61)
- Party: Republican

Paul Knierim (born March 27, 1965) is an American politician who served in the Connecticut House of Representatives from the 16th district from 1991 to 1997. He lived in Simsbury during his tenure.
