= Paul Cicarella =

American politician

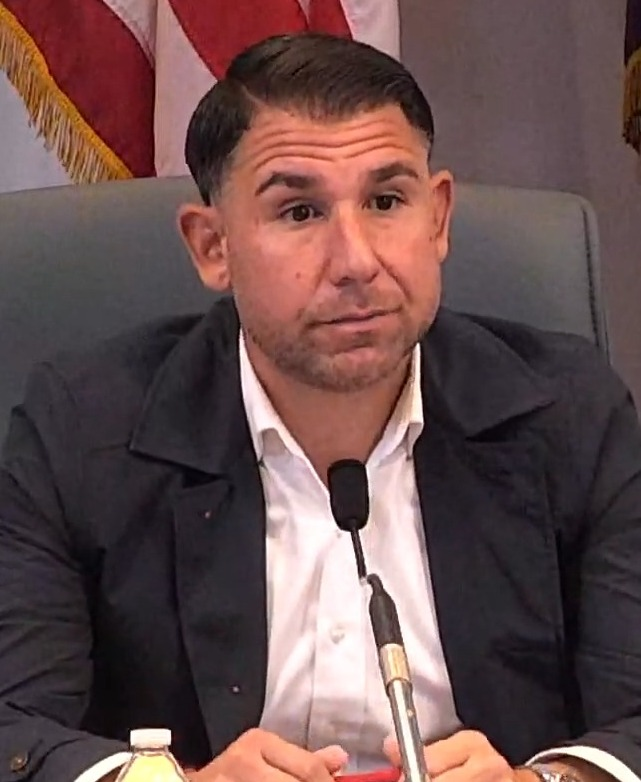
- Cicarella in 2022

Member of the Connecticut State Senate from the 34th district
- Incumbent
- Assumed office January 6, 2021
- Preceded by: Len Fasano
- Succeeded by: Brandi Mandato (elect)

Personal details
- Born: c. 1983
- Party: Republican
- Website: ctsenaterepublicans.com/home-cicarella/

Paul Cicarella is an American politician who is currently serving as a Connecticut State senator representing the 34th District, which encompasses Wallingford, Connecticut, North Haven, Connecticut, East Haven, Connecticut, and some surrounding towns. Cicarella is a member of the Republican Party.

== Political career ==
Following the announcement of Len Fasano's retirement in March 2020, Cicarella sought the Republican nomination for the seat. Cicarella won the general election against April Capone on November 3, 2020, Winning important votes in larger towns such as East Haven. Cicarella currently serves as the Ranking Member of both the Senate Housing Committee and the Veterans' Affairs Committee.

Cicarella was unopposed in 2022.

In March 2024, the New Haven Register reported that Cicarella's election in 2020 had increased his disability payout by 84%.

In June 2024, another New Haven Register investigation implied that Cicarella had not reported other income while he received disability payments.
