= United States–India Educational Foundation =

International educational foundation

The United States-India Educational Foundation (USIEF) (formerly known as the United States Educational Foundation in India) is an international foundation dedicated to higher education in India and the United States. Its primary focal points include administering the Fulbright Program to Indian and American students, faculty and professionals; encouraging international engagement of Fulbright scholars; advising students in India of higher education opportunities in the United States; and linking higher education institutions in the US and India. In addition to administering the Fulbright-Nehru programs in India, the Foundation also administers several Fulbright grants, including the Hubert H. Humphrey Fellowships; New Century Scholars Program, Teacher Exchange Program; International Fulbright Science and Technology Award; and the Foreign Language Teaching Assistant Program.

Headquartered in New Delhi, India, the Foundation was forged in 1950 as the "United States Educational Foundation in India" (USEFI) as the result of a 38-year agreement between the U.S. and India. In 2008, another agreement was signed which gave India equal partnership and modified the Foundation's name. Since May 2008, its executive director has been Adam J Grotsky. In February 2010, the Foundation celebrated its 60th Founding Day.
