= Connecticut's 34th State Senate district =

American legislative district

Senator
| Paul Cicarella; R |

Connecticut's 34th State Senate district elects one member of the Connecticut State Senate. It consists of the towns of Wallingford, North Haven, and parts of East Haven, Durham, and North Branford. It has been represented by Republican Paul Cicarella since 2021.

== List of senators ==
| Senators | Party | Years | District home | Note |
|---|---|---|---|---|
| David Parodi | Republican | 1961 – 1963 | Deep River | |
| Gustaf A. Carlson | Republican | 1963 – 1967 | Killingworth | |
| Pasquale A. Barbato | Democratic | 1967 – 1971 | Hamden | |
| Lawrence J. DeNardis | Republican | 1971 – 1979 | Hamden | Resigned to successfully run for the United States Congress |
| Philip S. Robertson | Republican | 1980 – 1995 | Cheshire | |
| Brian McDermott | Democratic | 1995 – 2003 | North Haven | |
| Len Fasano | Republican | 2003 – 2021 | North Haven | Served as Presidents pro tempore of the Connecticut Senate |
| Paul Cicarella | Republican | 2021 – present | North Haven | |

== Recent elections ==
=== 2020 ===
2020 Connecticut State Senate election, District 34
| Party | Candidate | Votes | % |
|---|---|---|---|
| Democratic | April Capone | 22,468 | 44.80 |
| Republican | Paul Cicarella, Jr | 27,691 | 55.20 |
| Total votes | | 50,159 | 100.00 |
| Republican hold | | | |

=== 2018 ===
2018 Connecticut State Senate election, District 34
| Party | Candidate | Votes | % |
|---|---|---|---|
| Total | Len Fasano (incumbent) | 23,853 | 58.5 |
| Republican | Len Fasano | 22,826 | 56.0 |
| Independent | Len Fasano | 1,027 | 2.5 |
| Democratic | Aili McKeen | 16,939 | 41.5 |
| Total votes | | 40,792 | 100.0 |
| Republican hold | | | |

=== 2016 ===
2016 Connecticut State Senate election, District 34
| Party | Candidate | Votes | % |
|---|---|---|---|
| Republican | Len Fasano (incumbent) | 35,049 | 100.0 |
| Total votes | | 35,049 | 100.0 |
| Republican hold | | | |

=== 2014 ===
2014 Connecticut State Senate election, District 34
| Party | Candidate | Votes | % |
|---|---|---|---|
| Republican | Len Fasano (incumbent) | 22,529 | 100.0 |
| Total votes | | 22,529 | 100.0 |
| Republican hold | | | |

=== 2012 ===
2012 Connecticut State Senate election, District 34
| Party | Candidate | Votes | % |
|---|---|---|---|
| Democratic | Steve Fontana | 17,601 | 41.90 |
| Republican | Len Fasano (incumbent) | 24,359 | 58.10 |
| Total votes | | 41,960 | 100.00 |
| Republican hold | | | |
