= Connecticut's 22nd State Senate district =

American legislative district

Senator
Sujata Gadkar-Wilcox; D

Connecticut's 22nd State Senate district elects one member of the Connecticut State Senate. It consists of the town of Trumbull as well as parts of Bridgeport and Monroe. It has been represented by Democrat Sujata Gadkar-Wilcox since 2025.

== Recent elections ==
=== 2020 ===
2020 Connecticut State Senate election, District 22
Party	Candidate	Votes	%
Democratic	Marilyn Moore (incumbent)	28,438	61.34
Republican	Steven S. Choi	17,070	36.82
Libertarian	Stephen Dincher	845	1.82
Write-in candidate	Devon Brown	9	0.02
Total votes		46,362	100.00
Democratic hold			

=== 2018 ===
2018 Connecticut State Senate election, District 22
Party	Candidate	Votes	%
Total	Marilyn Moore (incumbent)	19,795	59.1
Democratic	Marilyn Moore	19,130	57.1
Working Families	Marilyn Moore	665	2.0
Total	Rich Deecken	13,712	40.9
Republican	Rich Deecken	13,155	39.3
Independent	Rich Deecken	557	1.7
Total votes		33,507	100.0
Democratic hold			

=== 2016 ===
2016 Connecticut State Senate election, District 22
Party	Candidate	Votes	%
Democratic	Marilyn Moore (Incumbent)	22,271	55.88
Republican	Elaine Hammers	16,885	43.12
Total votes		39,156	100.0
Democratic hold			

=== 2014 ===
2014 Connecticut State Senate election, District 22
Party	Candidate	Votes	%
Democratic	Marilyn Moore	12,237	49.0
Republican	Enrico R. Constantini	11,545	46.20
Working Families	Marilyn Moore	1,202	4.8
Total votes		24,984	100.0
Democratic hold			

=== 2012 ===
2012 Connecticut State Senate election, District 22
Party	Candidate	Votes	%
Democratic	Anthony Musto (Incumbent)	24,512	67.30
Republican	Chadwick Ciocci	11,898	32.70
Total votes		36,410	100.0
Democratic hold			
