= Linda Schofield =

American politician

Member of the Connecticut House of Representatives from the 16th district
- In office January 3, 2007 – January 9, 2013
- Preceded by: Robert W. Heagney
- Succeeded by: John Hampton

Personal details
- Born: May 13, 1955 (age 71)
- Party: Democratic

Linda Schofield (born May 13, 1955) is an American politician who served in the Connecticut House of Representatives from the 16th district from 2007 to 2013.
