= John Hampton (politician) =

American politician

Member of the Connecticut House of Representatives from the 16th district
- In office 2013–2023
- Preceded by: Linda Schofield
- Succeeded by: Melissa Osborne

Personal details
- Born: December 6, 1966 (age 59) Tariffville, Connecticut, U.S.
- Party: Democratic

John Hampton (born December 6, 1966) is an American politician who served in the Connecticut House of Representatives from the 16th district in 2013. In 2022, it was announced that he would retire.
