= Kevin Witkos =

American politician

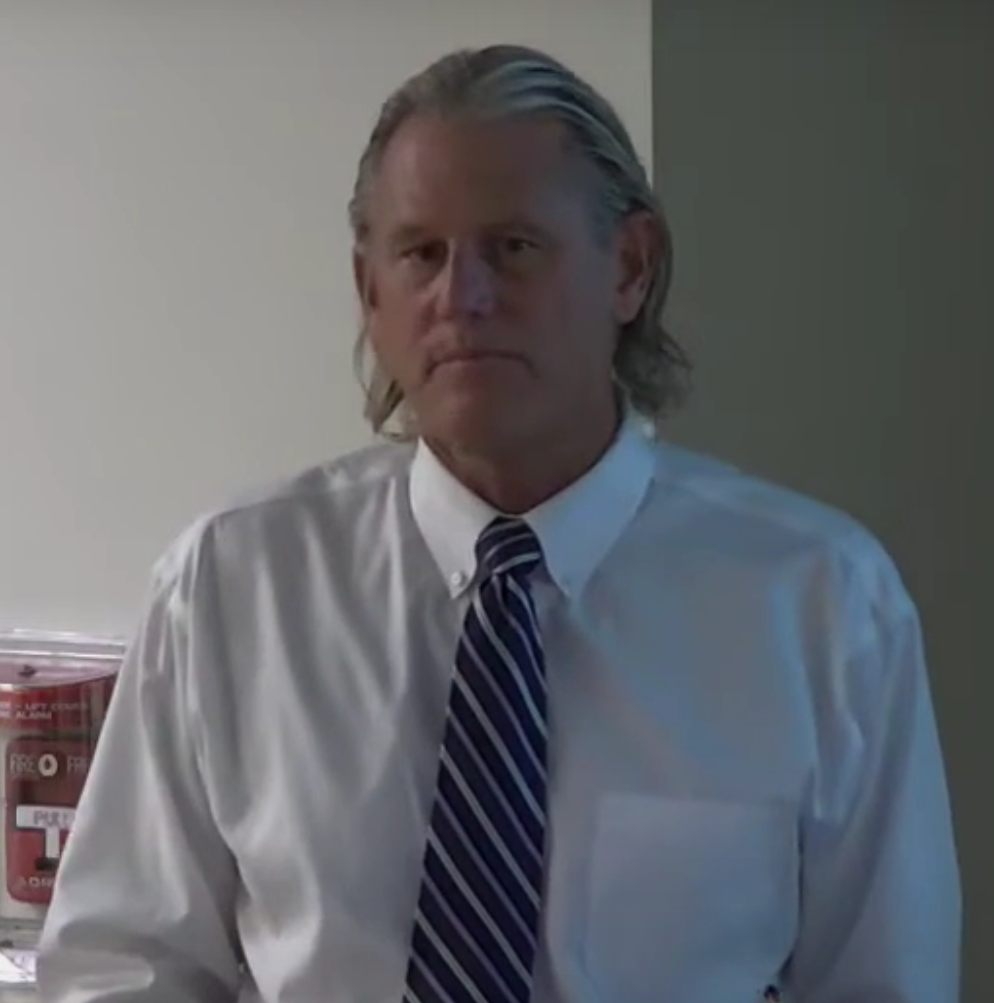

Member of the Connecticut State Senate from the 8th district
- In office January 7, 2009 – January 4, 2023
- Preceded by: Thomas Herlihy
- Succeeded by: Lisa Seminara
- Constituency: represents Avon, Barkhamsted, Canton, Colebrook, Granby, Hartland, Harwinton, New Hartford, Norfolk, Simsbury, and Torrington

Member of the Connecticut House of Representatives from the 17th district
- In office January 8, 2003 – January 7, 2009
- Preceded by: Jessie Stratton
- Succeeded by: Timothy LeGeyt

Personal details
- Born: 1964 or 1965 (age 61–62) Beverly, Massachusetts
- Party: Republican
- Education: Tunxis Community College (AS); University of Connecticut (BA)

Kevin Witkos (born 1964 or 1965) is a Republican member of the Connecticut State Senate who represented the 8th district from 2009 to 2023. He served as Deputy Senate Republican President Pro Tempore since January 2017 to January 2019. and previously served as Minority Leader Pro Tempore from 2014 to 2016 and Caucus Chairman for Outreach since 2013. Witkos served as the State Representative from the 17th district which includes Canton and part of Avon from 2003 to 2008.

== Political career ==
Witkos is the State Senator for the 8th Senate District since 2009, representing the northwest suburbs of Hartford in the Farmington Valley and Litchfield County in the Connecticut Senate, including the towns of Avon, Barkhamsted, Canton, Colebrook, Granby, Hartland, Harwinton, New Hartford, Norfolk, Simsbury, and Torrington.

In 2015, precipitated by the multiple criminal convictions of Central Connecticut State University professor Ravi Shankar, Witkos introduced legislation to require background checks before promoting professors in the state's university system. Though unsuccessful in the Senate, the legislation led to the Connecticut Board of Regents for Higher Education's proposal to allow convictions to be used as a consideration in employment decisions.

In 2017, Witkos joined with Senate Majority Leader Bob Duff in support of legislation to repeal occupational licensing requirements for certain jobs, including "above-ground swimming pool installer, uniform student athlete agents, licensed shorthand reporters, and real estate intern"; Governor Dannel P. Malloy signed the bill into law. In 2021, Kevin Witkos was the only Republican state senator to vote for the legalization of recreational marijuana. Witkos' vote was crucial, as the final tally was 19–17. Witkos' wife Esther is employed by Curaleaf, a medical marijuana producer. However, Witkos explained that her employment there had no bearing on his vote.

In January 2022, Witkos announced that he would not seek reelection and would retire at the end of his term.

== Professional career ==
Kevin Witkos is a Community Relations & Economic Development Specialist for Eversource, a Connecticut Electric Utility. He is also a former Canton Police Department sergeant who had a 28-year career in law enforcement.

== Fireworks proposal ==
Kevin and others sponsored a controversial bill that would legalize fireworks considered to be consumer-level by the federal government in an effort to boost revenue. However, the bill failed in the face of steep opposition by the state's police and fire-fighting forces.

== Personal ==
Witkos was born in Beverly, Massachusetts and holds an A.S. from Tunxis Community College and a B.A. from the University of Connecticut.

== See also ==
- Connecticut Senate
