= Anthony Musto =

American politician

Member of the Connecticut State Senate from the 22nd district
- In office January 7, 2009 – January 7, 2015
- Preceded by: Robert Russo
- Succeeded by: Marilyn Moore

Personal details
- Born: October 13, 1968 (age 57) New York City, New York
- Party: Democratic

Anthony Musto (born October 13, 1968) is an American politician who served in the Connecticut State Senate from the 22nd district from 2009 to 2015.
