= Kevin C. Kelly =

American lawyer and politician

Kevin Kelly
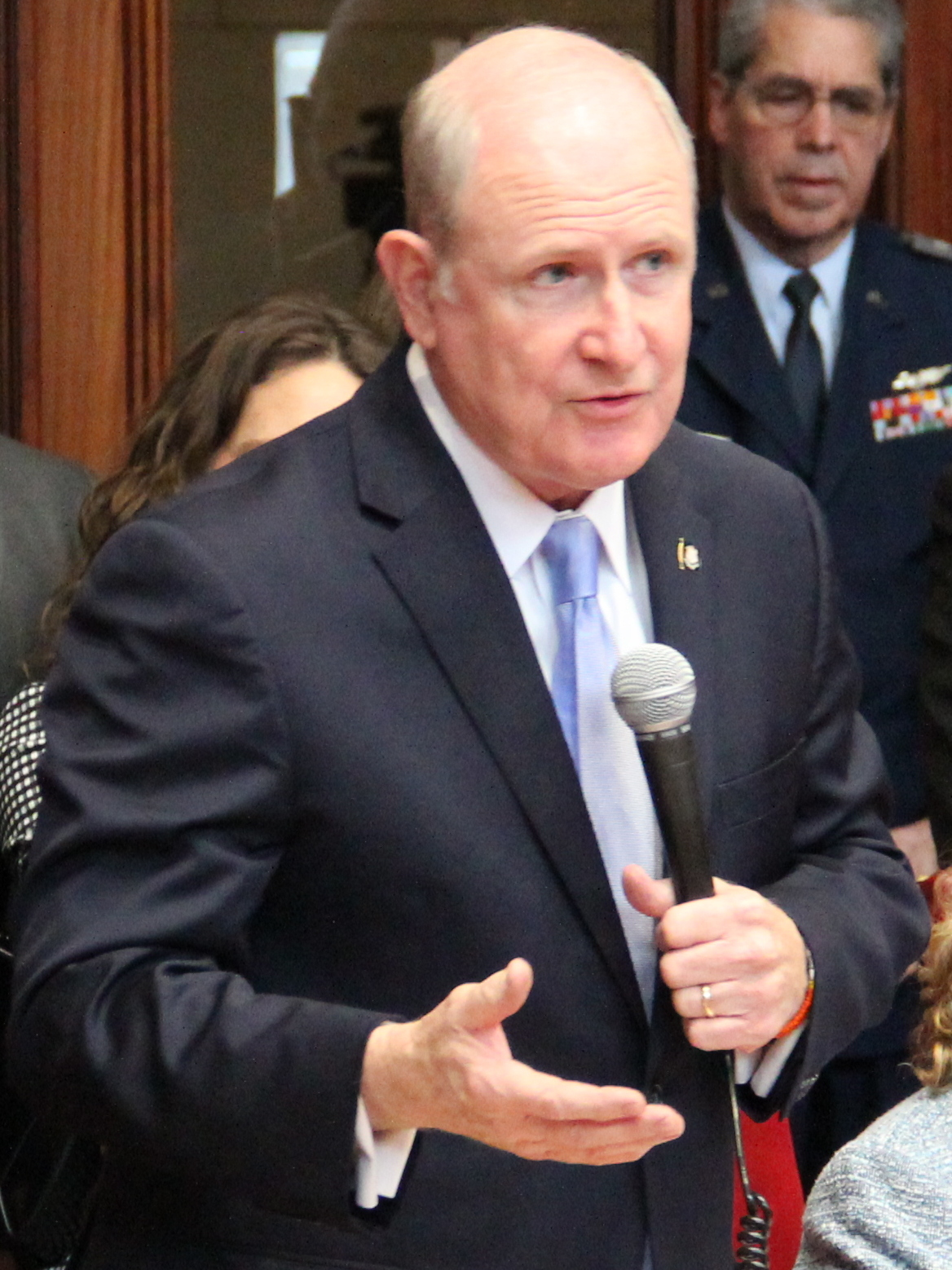
- Kelly in 2023

Minority Leader of the Connecticut State Senate
- In office January 6, 2021 – February 16, 2024
- Preceded by: Len Fasano
- Succeeded by: Stephen Harding

Member of the Connecticut State Senate from the 21st district
- In office January 5, 2011 – January 8, 2025
- Preceded by: Dan Debicella
- Succeeded by: Jason Perillo

Personal details
- Party: Republican
- Spouse: Cindy
- Children: 4
- Education: Assumption University (BA); Fairfield University (MA); University of Connecticut, Hartford (JD)

Kevin C. Kelly is an American lawyer and politician from Connecticut. A Republican, he was a member of the Connecticut State Senate from 2011 to 2025, elected from the 21st District. He was the Senate Republican Minority Leader from 2021 to 2024.

== Education ==
Kelly earned a B.A. from Assumption College in 1982, an M.A. from Fairfield University in 1985, and a J.D. from University of Connecticut School of Law in 1997.

== Legal and political career ==
Kelly was formerly a town attorney. He has a law office, Kevin Kelly & Associates, in Stratford, specializing in elder law. Before opening his legal practice, Kelly spent 13 years as an investigator for the Connecticut Department of Social Services.

In 1992, Kelly ran for the Connecticut House of Representatives in the 121st district. However, he lost the election to Terry Backer.

Since 2011, he has been a State Senator, representing part of the Naugatuck River Valley in the Connecticut Senate, including all of the town of Shelton and part of the towns of Monroe, Seymour, and Stratford.

In 2010, Kelly defeated James Miron, a former mayor of Stratford. In 2012, Kelly ran unopposed for the seat. In 2014, Kelly won reelection, defeating Democrat Prez Palmer. In 2016, Kelly won a fourth term in the Senate, again defeating Palmer. In 2018, Kelly won a fifth term in the Senate, defeating Democratic nominee Monica Tujak Brill. He ran unopposed in 2020.

In 2016, Kelly expressed support for Trump's presidential candidacy. In November 2020, the Senate Republican caucus elected Kelly to the post of Senate Minority Leader, replacing Len Fasano, who retired; Kelly appointed Paul Formica as his deputy. As of 2020, Kelly was the ranking member of the Senate committees on Aging, Insurance and Real Estate, and Children, and a member of the Regulation Review Committee.

In the state Senate, Kelly has championed efforts to make pregnancy a "qualifying life event" for purposes of health insurance enrollment; the legislation was supported by the Connecticut Commission on Women, Children and Seniors.

In 2020, Kelly voted against a police reform and accountability bill.

He was re-elected in the 2024 Connecticut State Senate election. In January 2025, he resigned his seat to take up a state judicial appointment.

== Personal life ==
Kelly is married and has four children and five grandchildren.

Connecticut State Senate
Preceded by Dan Debicella	Member of the Connecticut State Senate from the 21st district 2011–2025	Succeeded by Jason Perillo
Preceded by Len Fasano	Minority Leader of the Connecticut State Senate; 2021–2024	Succeeded by Stephen Harding
