= Fulbright-Nehru International Fellowship =

- Description: Awarded for academic excellence and leadership in cultural exchange
- Country: India and the United States
- Presented by: United States-India Educational Foundation
- Website: www.usief.org.in

The Fulbright-Nehru International Fellowship is a prestigious scholarship program that facilitates cultural exchange and academic collaboration between India and the United States. Named after Jawaharlal Nehru, the first Prime Minister of India, and U.S. Senator J. William Fulbright, the program supports Indian students and scholars in their pursuit of higher education in various fields at U.S. institutions.

== Program overview ==
The Fulbright-Nehru Fellowship aims to strengthen mutual understanding between the peoples of India and the United States through academic and cultural exchange. Participants are selected to study, research, and teach in a wide range of disciplines at U.S. institutions.

== Eligibility ==
Candidates must:

- Hold a degree equivalent to a U.S. bachelor's degree from a recognized Indian university with at least 55% marks.
- Demonstrate leadership qualities and a history of community service.
- Have a minimum of three years of professional work experience.
- Meet the English language proficiency requirements necessary for U.S. college and university admissions.

== Application process ==
Applicants go through a multi-stage selection process:

1. Complete an online application and attach necessary documentation.
2. Undergo academic and professional review by experts in their chosen field.
3. Participate in interviews if shortlisted.
4. Await final selection and notification by the USIEF.

== Benefits ==
Fellows receive:

- J-1 visa support for studying in the U.S.
- Round-trip airfare from their home city to the host institution.
- Funding for tuition and related academic fees.
- A living stipend.
- Accident and sickness coverage in accordance with U.S. Government guidelines.
