= Len Fasano =

American politician (born 1958)

President pro tempore of the Connecticut Senate
- In office February 28, 2017 – January 9, 2019 Serving with Martin Looney
- Preceded by: Martin Looney
- Succeeded by: Martin Looney

Minority Leader of the Connecticut Senate
- In office January 7, 2015 – January 6, 2021
- Preceded by: John P. McKinney
- Succeeded by: Kevin C. Kelly

Member of the Connecticut Senate from the 34th district
- In office January 8, 2003 – January 6, 2021
- Preceded by: Brian McDermott
- Succeeded by: Paul Cicarella

Personal details
- Born: May 15, 1958 (age 68) New Haven, Connecticut, U.S.
- Party: Republican
- Education: Yale University (BS); Quinnipiac University (JD); Boston University (LLM)

Len Fasano (born May 15, 1958) is a former Republican member of the Connecticut Senate, representing the 34th District since 2003. Fasano was sworn in as Senate Republican President Pro Tempore in January 2017. Under the leadership role Senator Fasano led a Republican caucus with considerably more control over the Senate's agenda than in previous years as a result of a power sharing agreement negotiated after Republicans gained three seats in the Connecticut Senate, creating a tie for the first time since 1893. Previously, he had served as the Senate Minority Leader since 2015.

Fasano was the State Senator for the 34th Senate District from 2003-2021, representing the suburbs of New Haven in the Connecticut Senate, including the towns of Durham (part), East Haven, North Haven (part), and Wallingford.

Fasano announced his plans to not seek reelection and retire from the State Senate in March 2020.

== Education ==
Fasano graduated from Hamden Hall Country Day School in 1977. He earned his B.S. from Yale University in 1981, a J.D. from Bridgeport University School of Law in 1984, and a LL.M. in taxation from Boston University School of Law in 1985.

== Career ==
Fasano is a tax attorney and a partner with Fasano, Ippolito, Lee & Florentine, with offices in New Haven and Branford. He also owns Silver Sands Beach and Tennis Club in East Haven, Connecticut.

== Senate career ==
Fasano was elected in 2002, 50% to 48%. He served as Minority Whip from 2003 to 2004, Assistant Minority Leader from 2005 to 2006, Deputy Minority Leader from 2007 to 2008, Minority Leader Pro Tempore from 2009 to 2014, Minority Leader since 2014, and Senate Republican President Pro Tempore since 2017.

Fasano ran unopposed for reelection in 2004, 2006, 2008, and 2010. In 2012, he defeated former state representative Steve Fontana, 58% to 42%. He ran unopposed for reelection in 2014 and 2016.

=== Health Care Issues ===
Alongside Senate President Pro Tempore Martin Looney, Fasano co-created and co-chaired Connecticut's Bipartisan Round Table on Hospitals and Health Care, established in 2014. In 2016, Fasano was recognized for his work on the Round Table and subsequent legislation that emerged from the bipartisan discussions with the Connecticut State Medical Society Legislative Award.

In 2015, Fasano and Looney worked together to pass a wide-ranging health care bill aiming to help control health care costs and improve transparency for patients.

In 2017, Fasano and Looney worked together again to craft and pass a bill attempting to lower prescription drug costs by, among other measures, allowing pharmacists to divulge information about actual drug price, and forbidding benefit managers from charging customers more than the full price of a drug and keeping the difference (so-called "clawback" practices).

Fasano also worked to make Connecticut the second state in the nation to implement a statewide screening program to test all newborns for adrenoleukodystrophy (ALD), a genetic brain disorder. He was the lead sponsor for the legislation in 2013 that was fully implemented in 2016.

=== Urban Development & Jobs Policies ===
Fasano has proposed policies focused on urban development and job growth in Connecticut cities. Proposals have included ideas to encourage the poor to enter the job market, remove disincentives to securing a job, and direct certain higher-education funds to subsidize low-income parents seeking college degrees. In 2017 the state Senate passed a bill proposed by Fasano to expedite the brownfield redevelopment process to redevelop old urban industrial properties and encourage urban developers to work with high schools and community technical colleges on curriculum to train future job seekers. The bill was not called for a vote in the House of Representatives.

=== Advocacy for the Disabled ===
Fasano has advocated for budgets that protect funding for social services for individuals with intellectual and developmental disabilities. He has protested deep cuts to these services. He cosponsored legislation in 2016 to improve communication between the Department of Developmental Services (DDS) and families in need of services for family members with intellectual and developmental disabilities. Fasano worked alongside a bipartisan group of lawmakers, the DDS state agency, and advocacy groups including DDS Families First and the Arc of Connecticut to draft the legislation which requires DDS to provide families with information about their eligibility status for state resources and initiated communication between the agency and families to improve the system.

=== Advocacy for Children ===
Fasano was named a Children's Champion in 2015 and 2016 by the Early Childhood Alliance.

He has been a vocal critic of the Connecticut Department of Children and Families under the leadership of Commissioner Joette Katz appointed by Governor Dannel P. Malloy, including findings that children's needs are not being met by the department, multiple reports of system failures conducted by the Office of the Child Advocate, an unprecedented number of child homicides where children were under the care of the Department of Children and Families, and cases of child abuse reported at the Department's locked facilities.

Senator Fasano has proposed reforms to increase oversight of the department over many years. He renewed calls for reform following a Federal Audit conducted by the U.S. Department of Health and Human Services' Administration for Children and Families which found that the agency practice is inconsistent in assessing safety and risk in the child's living environment and in preventing children's removal from their homes. The audit also found that Connecticut's child welfare agency is not in substantial conformity with any of the seven child and family outcomes related to children's safety, permanency, and well-being.

In 2017, a bill backed by Fasano to increase oversight of the Department of Children and Families garnered bipartisan support and passed the state Senate.

The Connecticut chapter of Mothers Against Drunk Driving (MADD) named Fasano a "Legislator of the Year" multiple times including in 2016 and 2013 recognizing his efforts in support of tougher laws to help prevent drunk driving and educate young drivers about road safety.

== Criticism ==
In December 2014, Fasano appointed former state Republican Chair Chris Healy as a senior advisor to the State Senate Republicans. Healy was described as an unindicted co-conspirator in the prosecution of Lisa Wilson-Foley. The hiring was condemned by Farmington Republican and former FBI agent Mike Clark, who ran against, and lost to, Wilson-Foley for the Republican nomination for Congress in 2010.

In 2016, it was reported that the Senate Republican Caucus had hired a former state employee in 2012 living in Texas to manage the Senate Republican website, at the same time this former employee was managing the campaign websites of Republican senators. Fasano said he was confident that the contractor upheld the separation between his contract and campaign work, but also told the contractor to stop performing campaign consulting jobs for Connecticut Senate Caucus members to remove any appearance of impropriety. The State Election Enforcement agreed with Fasano and took no action on the Democratic complaint, noticing Democratic Senators Looney and Duff in a SEEC report on August 23, 2018, where it found no evidence to support their claims.

In October 2017, Fasano was criticized by Dita Bhargava for what she called a "pattern of misdirected criticism towards women holding high-ranking positions in our state's public institutions.” As evidence she cited his conduct towards Susan Herbst (UCONN president), Dora Schriro (Department of Emergency Services and Public Protection), and Joette Katz (Department of Children and Families). Fasano was among leaders of both parties that criticized Herbst after giving raises to several senior staff. The move came in the midst of funding cuts and tuition raises. Leaders of both parties from both the House and Senate opposed the raises and encouraged Herbst and the University to rescind them. Fasano criticized Schriro for what The New York Times called "outrageous behavior" tied to a prison scandal, and which The New York Times said she led a "department historically protected and empowered people who were comfortable with misconduct and a deep-seated culture of violence." Fasano asked Katz to step down as Commissioner of the Department of Children and Families following "the abuse of children at DCF's locked facilities, the agency's failure to investigate many of these cases, and a continuous struggle to embrace transparency." Bhargava also compared Fasano to president Donald Trump. Fasano responded “Sen. Fasano does not intend to respond to a political candidate trying to make news.”

== Personal life ==
Fasano and his wife Jill have three adult children, all graduates of Hamden Hall Country Day School. He is a founder of the East Haven Land Trust, and a Trustee of Hamden Hall Country Day School.

== See also ==
- Connecticut Senate
- Senate Maps

Connecticut State Senate
Preceded by John P. McKinney	Minority Leader of the Connecticut Senate; 2015–2021	Succeeded by Kevin C. Kelly
Preceded by John P. McKinney	President pro tempore of the Connecticut Senate; 2017–2019; Served alongside: Martin Looney	Succeeded by Martin Looney
