= Harwinton, Connecticut =

- Town
- Town of Harwinton
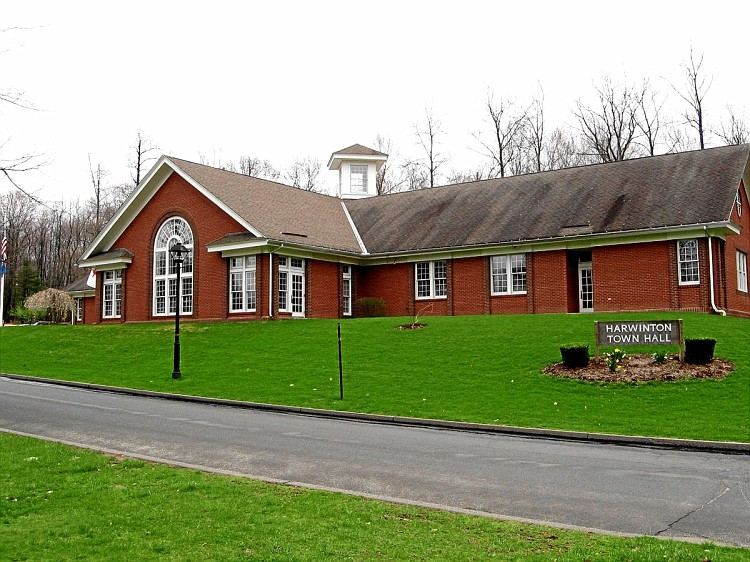
- Harwinton Town Hall

- Seal
- Interactive map of Harwinton, Connecticut
- Coordinates: 41°45′16″N 73°03′25″W
- Country: United States
- U.S. state: Connecticut
- County: Litchfield
- Region: Northwest Hills
- Incorporated: 1737

Government
  - Type: Selectman-town meeting
  - First selectman: Michael R. Criss (R)
  - Selectman: Evan Brunetti
  - Selectman: Paul Honig

Area
  - Total: 31.2 sq mi (80.7 km^{2})
  - Land: 30.8 sq mi (79.8 km^{2})
  - Water: 0.35 sq mi (0.9 km^{2})
- Elevation: 794 ft (242 m)

Population (2020)
  - Total: 5,484
  - Density: 178/sq mi (68.7/km^{2})
- Time zone: UTC−5 (Eastern)
  - Summer (DST): UTC−4 (Eastern)
- ZIP code: 06791
- Area codes: 860/959
- FIPS code: 09-37280
- GNIS feature ID: 0213444
- Website: www.harwinton.gov

Harwinton (/ˈhɑːrwɪntən/ HAHR-win-tən) is a small town located in Litchfield County. The population was 5,484 at the 2020 census. The town is part of the Northwest Hills Planning Region. The town is served by the Regional School District 10.

== History ==
Prior to settlement by colonists, Harwinton sat at the confluence of various tribal territories, including the Tunxis tribe. The Connecticut Colony granted and split the area of modern-day Harwinton to the townships of Hartford and Windsor in May 1729. Harwinton was first settled in January 1730 by Daniel Messenger. Townships were formally established in the following years in the Hartford and Windsor allotments.

Harwinton was incorporated as an independent town in October 1737. The name of the town alludes to Hartford and Windsor, Connecticut (HAR + WIN) followed by the suffix -ton, meaning town.

== Geography ==
Harwinton is located in the eastern regions of Litchfield County; it is bordered to the northwest by the city of Torrington and to the east by Burlington in Hartford County. Hartford, the state capital, is 23 miles (37 km) to the east, and Bristol is 11 miles (18 km) to the southeast.

According to the United States Census Bureau, Harwinton has a total area of 31.2 square miles (80.7 km^{2}), of which 30.8 square miles (79.8 km^{2}) are land and 0.35 square miles (0.9 km^{2}) of it, or 1.12%, are water. The town is bordered to the west by the Naugatuck River. The southeastern portion of the town contains the Roraback Wildlife Area and several reservoirs.

=== Principal communities ===
- Campville
- Harwinton Center (part of Northwest Harwinton CDP)

== Demographics ==
Historical population
Census	Pop.	Note	%±
1820	1,500		—
1850	1,175		—
1860	1,044		−11.1%
1870	1,044		0.0%
1880	1,016		−2.7%
1890	943		−7.2%
1900	1,213		28.6%
1910	1,440		18.7%
1920	2,020		40.3%
1930	949		−53.0%
1940	1,112		17.2%
1950	1,858		67.1%
1960	3,344		80.0%
1970	4,318		29.1%
1980	4,889		13.2%
1990	5,228		6.9%
2000	5,283		1.1%
2010	5,642		6.8%
2020	5,484		−2.8%
U.S. Decennial Census

Per the 2020 United States census, there were 5,484 people and 1,641 family households living in the town. The population density was 178 inhabitants per square mile (68.7/km^{2}). There were 2,313 housing units at an average density of 74.1 per square mile (28.7/km^{2}). The racial makeup of the town was 93.0% White, 0.67% African American, 0.16% Native American, 0.57% Asian, 0.46% from other races, and 5.42% from two or more races. Hispanic or Latino of any race were 3.14% of the population.

There were 2,179 occupied households, out of which 25.5% had children under the age of 18 living with them, 62.6% were married couples living together, 8.0% had a female householder with no husband present, and 24.7% were non-families. 20.2% of all households were made up of individuals, and 10.2% had someone living alone who was 65 years of age or older. The average household size was 2.52 people.

In the town, the population distribution was 20.3% under the age of 18, 6.4% from 18 to 24, 18.7% from 25 to 44, 31.4% from 45 to 64, and 23.2% who were 65 years of age or older. The median age was 48.7 years. The population was 50.3% male and 49.7% female.

According the American Community Survey 5-year estimates for 2018 to 2022, the median household income in the town was $102,078 and per capita income was $53,705. An estimated 3.2% of the population were below the poverty line.

Voter registration and party enrollment as of October 31, 2023
Party	Active voters	Inactive voters	Total voters	Percentage
Republican	1,508	69	1,577	34.26%
Democratic	935	58	993	21.57%
Unaffiliated	1,816	133	1,949	42.34%
Minor Parties	77	7	84	1.82%
Total	4,336	267	4,603	100%

== Infrastructure ==
Connecticut Route 4 connects the town to Torrington in the northwest and to Hartford in the east. Route 118 connects the town westward to Litchfield, with a junction for the Route 8 expressway in the western part of the town. Route 222 runs south from Harwinton to Thomaston center. Route 72 leads southeast to the city of Bristol.

== Notable people ==
- Harry C. Bentley (1877–1967), founder of Bentley University
- Jonathan Brace (1754–1837), judge and U.S. congressman
- George S. Catlin (1808–1851), U.S. congressman
- Benjamin Michael Flowers (b. 1987), former Ohio Solicitor General
- Collis Potter Huntington (1821–1900), one of four men who formed the Central Pacific Railroad
- Elam Luddington (1806–1893), Mormon pioneer to Utah and the first Mormon missionary to preach in Thailand
- Luman Watson (1790–1834), clockmaker
- Abner Wilcox (1808–1869), missionary teacher to the Kingdom of Hawaii

== Notable locations ==
- Burlington-Harmony Hills Roads Historic District
- Jason Skinner House
- Litchfield–South Roads Historic District
