= Connecticut State Senate =

Upper house of the Connecticut General Assembly

- Connecticut General Assembly

Type
- Type: Upper house
- Term limits: None

History
- New session started: January 8, 2025

Leadership
- President: Susan Bysiewicz (D) since January 9, 2019
- President pro tempore: Martin Looney (D) since January 7, 2015
- Majority Leader: Bob Duff (D) since January 7, 2015
- Minority Leader: Stephen Harding (R) since February 16, 2024

Structure
- Seats: 36
- Political groups: Majority: Democratic (25); Minority: Republican (11)
- Length of term: 2 years
- Authority: Article III, Section 1, Connecticut Constitution
- Salary: $43,600/year

Elections
- Last election: November 5, 2024 (36 seats)
- Next election: November 3, 2026 (36 seats)
- Redistricting: Legislative Control

Meeting place
- State Senate Chamber; Connecticut State Capitol; Hartford, Connecticut

Website
- Connecticut State Senate

The Connecticut State Senate is the upper house of the Connecticut General Assembly, the state legislature of the U.S. state of Connecticut. The state senate comprises 36 members, each representing a district with around 99,280 inhabitants. Senators are elected to two-year terms without term limits. The Connecticut State Senate is one of 14 state legislative upper houses whose members serve two-year terms; four-year terms are more common.

As in other upper houses of state and territorial legislatures and the federal U.S. Senate, the Senate is vested with special functions such as confirming or rejecting gubernatorial appointments to the state's executive departments, the state cabinet, commissions and boards. Unlike a majority of U.S. state legislatures, both the Connecticut House of Representatives and the State Senate vote on the composition of the Connecticut Supreme Court.

The Senate meets within the State Capitol in Hartford.

== History ==
The Senate has its basis in the earliest incarnation of the General Assembly, the "General Corte" established in 1636, whose membership was divided between at least six generally elected magistrates (the predecessor of the Senate) and three-member "committees" representing each of the towns of the Connecticut Colony (the predecessors of the House of Representatives). The Fundamental Orders of Connecticut, adopted in 1639, renamed the committees to "deputies", the Corte to the Court, and established that the magistrates were generally elected for yearlong terms; the magistrate who received the highest number of votes would serve as governor for the year, so long as he had previously served as a magistrate and had not been governor the previous year. Other magistrates were elected deputy governor, secretary, and treasurer. Although the magistrates and deputies sat together, they voted separately, and in 1645, it was decreed that a measure had to have the approval of both groups in order to pass. The Charter of 1662 replaced the six magistrates with twelve assistants, not including the governor and deputy governor, and renamed the legislature to the General Assembly. In 1698, the General Assembly split into a bicameral body, divided between the Council and the House of Representatives. The Council contained the twelve assistants, the deputy governor, and the governor, who led the body, while the House was led by a Speaker elected from among its members. Because the governor led it and other notables sat in it, the Council took precedence over the House, and when the two chambers were at odds, the House deferred to the Council. The 1818 constitution renamed the council to the Senate, removed the governor and deputy governor from its membership, and removed all remaining judicial and executive authority from it, but it remained largely the same in that it still consisted of twelve generally elected members. It was in 1828 that senatorial districts were established and the number of senators revised to between eight and twenty-four; the number was altered to between twenty-four and thirty-six in 1901, with the General Assembly setting it at thirty-six immediately. Senatorial terms were raised to two years in 1875.

In 1814–15, the Hartford Convention met in the Connecticut Senate chamber of what is now the Old State House.

== Leadership of the Senate ==
The Lieutenant Governor of Connecticut serves as the President of the Senate, but only casts a vote if required to break a tie. In the absence of the lieutenant governor, the President Pro Tempore of the Connecticut Senate presides. The President pro tempore is elected by the majority party caucus, followed by confirmation of the entire Senate through a Senate Resolution. The President pro tempore is the chief leadership position in the Senate. The Senate majority and minority leaders are elected by their respective party caucuses.

The President of the Senate is Susan Bysiewicz of the Democratic Party. The President pro tempore is Democrat Martin Looney (D-New Haven). The Majority Leader is Bob Duff (D-Norwalk) and the Minority Leader is Stephen Harding (R-Brookfield).

=== Current leadership ===
Position	Senator	District
Lieutenant Governor	Susan Bysiewicz	—N/a
President Pro Tempore	Martin Looney	11
Majority Leader	Bob Duff	25
Majority Whip	Herron Gaston	23
Minority Leader	Stephen Harding	30
Minority Whip	Paul Cicarella	34

== Make-up of the Senate ==
As of January 2025, the makeup of the Connecticut Senate consisted of 25 seats for Democrats and 10 seats for Republicans. In the 2024 elections, Democrats picked up District 8, giving them 25 seats to the Republicans' 11 seats.

↓
25	11
Democratic	Republican

Affiliation	Party		Total	Vacant
Affiliation	Democratic	Republican	Total	Vacant
End of Previous Legislature: 2023–2025	24	12	36	0
Start of Current Legislature: 2025–2027 (Note: Republican Senator Kevin Kelly (District 21) resigned before the start of the legislative session to pursue another job.)	25	10	35	1
February 28, 2025 (Note: Republican Jason Perillo was elected in a special election for the 21st district.)	25	11	36	0
Latest Voting Share	69.4%	30.6%		

=== Members of the Senate ===
Current members of the Connecticut Senate, as of February 28, 2025.

District	Name	Party	Residence	Start	Towns represented
1	John Fonfara	Dem	Hartford	1996	Hartford (part), Wethersfield (part)
2	Douglas McCrory	Dem	Bloomfield	2017 (Note: First elected in a special election.)	Bloomfield (part), Hartford (part), Windsor (part)
3	Saud Anwar	Dem	South Windsor	2019	East Hartford, East Windsor, Ellington (part), South Windsor
4	MD Rahman	Dem	Manchester	2022	Andover, Bolton, Glastonbury, Manchester
5	Derek Slap	Dem	West Hartford	2019	Bloomfield (part), Burlington, Farmington (part), West Hartford
6	Rick Lopes	Dem	New Britain	2020	Berlin, Farmington (part), New Britain
7	John Kissel	Rep	Enfield	1993	East Granby, Ellington (part), Enfield, Granby (part), Somers, Suffield, Windsor (part), Windsor Locks
8	Paul Honig	Dem	Harwinton	2024	Avon, Barkhamsted, Canton, Colebrook, Granby (part), Hartland, Harwinton (part), Hartland, Norfolk, Simsbury, Torrington (part)
9	Matthew Lesser	Dem	Middletown	2018	Cromwell, Middletown (part), Newington, Rocky Hill, Wethersfield (part)
10	Gary Winfield	Dem	New Haven	2014	New Haven (part), West Haven (part)
11	Martin Looney	Dem	New Haven	1993	Hamden (part), New Haven (part)
12	Christine Cohen	Dem	Guilford	2018	Branford, Durham (part), East Haven (part), Guilford, Killingworth, Madison, Middlefield (part), North Branford (part)
13	Jan Hochadel	Dem	Meriden	2022	Cheshire (part), Meriden, Middlefield (part), Middletown (part)
14	James Maroney	Dem	Milford	2018	Milford, Orange, West Haven (part), Woodbridge (part)
15	Joan Hartley	Dem	Waterbury	2000	Middlebury (part), Naugatuck (part), Waterbury (part)
16	Rob Sampson	Rep	Wolcott	2018	Cheshire (part), Prospect, Southington, Waterbury (part), Wolcott
17	Jorge Cabrera	Dem	Hamden	2020	Ansonia, Beacon Falls, Bethany, Derby, Hamden (part), Naugatuck (part), Woodbridge (part)
18	Heather Somers	Rep	Groton	2016	Griswold, Groton, North Stonington, Plainfield, Preston, Sterling, Stonington, Voluntown
19	Catherine Osten	Dem	Sprague	2012	Columbia, Franklin, Hebron, Lebanon, Ledyard, Lisbon, Marlborough, Montville (part), Norwich, Sprague
20	Martha Marx	Dem	New London	2022	Bozrah, East Lyme, Montville (part), New London, Old Lyme, Old Saybrook (part), Salem, Waterford
21	Jason Perillo	Rep	Shelton	2025	Monroe (part), Seymour (part), Shelton, Stratford (part)
22	Sujata Gadkar-Wilcox	Dem	Trumbull	2024	Bridgeport (part), Monroe (part), Trumbull
23	Herron Gaston	Dem	Bridgeport	2022	Bridgeport (part), Stratford (part)
24	Julie Kushner	Dem	Danbury	2018	Danbury, New Fairfield (part), Ridgefield (part)
25	Bob Duff	Dem	Norwalk	2004	Darien (part), Norwalk
26	Ceci Maher	Dem	Wilton	2022	Darien (part), New Canaan (part), Stamford (part), Redding, Ridgefield (part), Weston (part), Westport, Wilton
27	Patricia Billie Miller	Dem	Stamford	2021	Darien (part), Stamford (part)
28	Tony Hwang	Rep	Fairfield	2014	Bethel (part), Easton, Fairfield, Newtown,
29	Mae Flexer	Dem	Windham	2014	Brooklyn, Canterbury, Killingly, Mansfield, Pomfret, Putnam, Scotland, Thompson (part), Windham
30	Stephen Harding	Rep	Brookfield	2022	Bethlehem (part), Brookfield (part), Canaan, Cornwall, Goshen, Kent, Litchfield, Morris, New Fairfield (part), New Milford, North Canaan, Salisbury, Sharon, Sherman, Torrington (part), Warren, Washington (part), Winchester
31	Henri Martin	Rep	Bristol	2014	Bristol, Harwinton (part), Plainville, Plymouth, Thomaston
32	Eric Berthel	Rep	Watertown	2017	Bethel (part), Bethlehem (part), Bridgewater, Brookfield (part), Middlebury (part), Oxford, Roxbury, Seymour (part), Southbury, Washington (part), Watertown, Woodbury
33	Norman Needleman	Dem	Essex	2018	Chester, Clinton, Colchester, Deep River, East Haddam, East Hampton, Essex, Haddam, Lyme, Old Saybrook (part), Portland, Westbrook
34	Paul Cicarella	Rep	North Haven	2020	Durham (part), East Haven (part), North Branford (part), North Haven, Wallingford
35	Jeff Gordon	Rep	Woodstock	2022	Ashford, Chaplin, Coventry, Eastford, Ellington (part), Hampton, Stafford, Thompson (part), Tolland, Union, Vernon, Willington, Woodstock
36	Ryan Fazio	Rep	Greenwich	2021	Greenwich, New Canaan (part), Stamford (part)

== Notable former members ==
- Joe Lieberman, US Senator and 2000 Vice Presidential Nominee
- Chris Murphy, US Senator
- Richard Blumenthal, US Senator
- Beth Bye, plaintiff in the 2008 case that legalized same-sex marriage in Connecticut
- Will Haskell, elected at age 22, author of '100,000 First Bosses'
- Edward M. Kennedy Jr., son of Ted Kennedy

== See also ==
- Connecticut State Capitol
- Connecticut General Assembly
- Connecticut House of Representatives
- Historic members of the Connecticut Senate
