= 2016 Connecticut Senate election =

- November 8, 2016

All 36 seats in the Connecticut State Senate 19 seats needed for a majority
- Turnout: 76.94% ▲
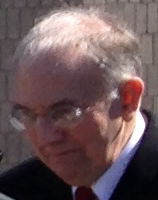

	Majority party	Minority party
Leader	Martin Looney	Len Fasano
Party	Democratic	Republican
Leader since	January 7, 2015	January 7, 2015
Leader's seat	11th	34th
Last election	21	15
Seats won	18	18
Seat change	▼3	▲3
- Results: Republican gain Democratic hold Republican hold
President pro tempore of the Senate before election
Martin Looney
Democratic
Elected President pro tempore of the Senate
Martin Looney (Democratic)
Len Fasano (Republican)

The 2016 Connecticut Senate election was held on November 8, 2016, concurrently with the elections for the Connecticut House of Representatives, to elect members to the Connecticut General Assembly. All 36 seats in the Connecticut Senate were up for election. The election resulted in a tie, with the parties controlling 18 seats each. Primary elections were held on August 9, 2016.

== Results ==
↓
18	18
Democratic	Republican

Parties	Candidates	Seats				Popular Vote		
Parties	Candidates	2014	2016	+/-	Strength	Vote	%	Change
Democratic	35	21	18	▼3	50.00%	747,662	48.56%	
Republican	33	15	18	▲3	50.00%	713,635	46.35%	
Independent Party	1 (Note: In addition, the Independent Party of Connecticut cross-endorsed 23 candidates, 22 Republicans and 1 Democrat.)	0	0	Steady	0.00%	41,265	2.68%	
Working Families	0 (Note: In addition, the Working Families Party of Connecticut cross-endorsed 20 candidates, all Democrats.)	0	0	Steady	0.00%	31,359	2.04%	
Green	4	0	0	Steady	0.00%	3,468	0.23%	
Other parties and Write-ins	5	0	0	Steady	0.00%	2,247	0.15%	
Total	78	36	36	0	100.00%	1,539,636	100.00%	-

=== Composition ===
Affiliation	Party (Shading indicates majority caucus)		Total	
Affiliation	Democratic	Republican	Total	Vacant
Before Election	21	15	36	0
After Election	18	18	36	0
Change	▼3	▲3		Steady

== Predictions ==
Source	Ranking	As of
Governing	Tossup	October 12, 2016

== Detailed results ==
=== District 1 ===
Democratic incumbent John Fonfara was re-elected to an 11th term after defeating Republican candidate Barbara Ruhe and Green Party candidate Barbara Barry. Fonfara has represented the 1st District since 1997.

2016 Connecticut State Senate election, District 1
Party	Candidate	Votes	%
Democratic	John Fonfara (incumbent)	20,437	74.81%
Republican	Barbara Ruhe	6,052	22.15%
Green	Barbara Barry	829	3.03%
Total votes		27,318	100.00%
Democratic hold			

=== District 2 ===
Democratic incumbent Eric Coleman was re-elected to a 12th term after defeating Republican candidate Theresa Tillett and write-in candidates Charles Jackson and Martha S. Kelly. Coleman was also nominated by the Working Families Party. He has represented the 2nd District since 1995.

2016 Connecticut State Senate election, District 2
Party	Candidate	Votes	%
Democratic	Eric Coleman	29,319	79.97%
Working Families	Eric Coleman	1,453	3.96%
Total	Eric Coleman (incumbent)	30,772	83.93%
Republican	Theresa Tillett	5,888	16.06%
Write-in	Charles Jackson	1	0.00%
Write-in	Martha S. Kelly	0	0.00%
Total votes		36,661	100.00%
Democratic hold			

=== District 3 ===
Democratic incumbent Timothy Larson was re-elected to a second term after defeating Republican candidate Carolyn Mirek. Mirek was also nominated by the Independent Party. Larson had represented the 3rd District since 2015.

2016 Connecticut State Senate election, District 3
Party	Candidate	Votes	%
Democratic	Timothy Larson (incumbent)	23,913	56.18%
Republican	Carolyn Mirek	17,260	40.55%
Independent Party	Carolyn Mirek	1,390	3.27%
Total	Carolyn Mirek	18,650	43.82%
Total votes		42,563	100.00%
Democratic hold			

=== District 4 ===
Incumbent Democratic state senator Steve Cassano was re-elected to a fourth term, defeating former Republican board of education and town council member of Glastonbury, Lorraine Marchetti. Cassano had also been nominated by the Working Families Party, while Marchetti was also nominated by the Independent Party of Connecticut. Cassano had represented the 4th State Senate district since 2011.

2016 Connecticut State Senate election, District 4
Party	Candidate	Votes	%
Democratic	Steve Cassano	22,525	47.22%
Working Families	Steve Cassano	1,621	3.40%
Total	Steve Cassano (incumbent)	24,146	50.62%
Republican	Lorraine Marchetti	22,125	46.38%
Independent Party	Lorraine Marchetti	1,432	3.00%
Total	Lorraine Marchetti	23,557	49.38%
Total votes		47,703	100.00%
Democratic hold			

=== District 5 ===
Incumbent Democratic state senator Beth Bye was re-elected to a fourth term, defeating Republican nominee Mark Merrit, who also had been nominated by the Independent Party of Connecticut. Bye had represented the 5th district since 2011.

2016 Connecticut State Senate election, District 5
Party	Candidate	Votes	%
Democratic	Beth Bye (incumbent)	30,655	59.20%
Republican	Mark Merritt	20,088	38.79%
Independent Party	Mark Merritt	1,040	2.01%
Total	Mark Merritt	21,128	40.80%
Total votes		51,783	100.00%
Democratic hold			

=== District 6 ===
Incumbent Democratic state senator Terry Gerratana was re-elected to a fourth term, defeating Republican nominee Charles Paonessa and petitioning candidate Sharon Beloin-Saavedra. Beloin-Saavedra was a nominee in the Democratic primary for this seat, losing to Gerratana, receiving only 33.1% of the primary vote. Gerratana was also nominated by the Working Families Party, and had represented the 6th district since 2011.

2016 Connecticut State Senate election, District 6
Party	Candidate	Votes	%
Democratic	Terry Bielinski Gerratana	18,227	55.73%
Working Families	Terry Bielinski Gerratana	1,456	4.45%
Total	Terry Bielinski Gerratana (incumbent)	24,146	60.18%
Republican	Charles Paonessa	10,788	32.99%
Petitioning	Sharon R. Beloin-Saavedra	2,234	6.83%
Total votes		37,168	100.00%
Democratic hold			

=== District 7 ===
Incumbent Republican state senator John Kissel was re-elected to a twelfth full term, defeating former Democratic state representative Annie Hornish, who represented the 62nd district from 2009-2011. Kissel had also been nominated by the Independent Party of Connecticut, while Hornish was also nominated by the Working Families Party. Kissel had represented the 7th district since winning a special election in 1993.

2016 Connecticut State Senate election, District 7
Party	Candidate	Votes	%
Republican	John Kissel	26,755	56.88%
Independent Party	John Kissel	1,896	4.03%
Total	John Kissel (incumbent)	28,651	60.91%
Democratic	Annie Hornish	16,814	35.74%
Working Families	Annie Hornish	1,574	3.35%
Total	Annie Hornish	18,388	39.09%
Total votes		47,039	100.00%
Republican hold			

=== District 8 ===
Incumbent Republican state senator Kevin Witkos was re-elected to a fifth term, defeating Democratic nominee David Pena. Witkos was also nominated by the Independent Party of Connecticut, and had represented the 8th district since 2009.

2016 Connecticut State Senate election, District 8
Party	Candidate	Votes	%
Republican	Kevin Witkos	30,683	60.11%
Independent Party	Kevin Witkos	2,156	4.22%
Total	Kevin Witkos (incumbent)	32,839	64.33%
Democratic	David Pena	18,204	35.66%
Total votes		51,043	100.00%
Republican hold			

=== District 9 ===
Incumbent Democratic state senator Paul Doyle was re-elected to a sixth term, defeating Republican nominee Earle Roberts, who previously lost to Doyle in 2014. Doyle had represented the 9th district since 2007.

2016 Connecticut State Senate election, District 9
Party	Candidate	Votes	%
Democratic	Paul Doyle (incumbent)	29,684	63.30%
Republican	Earle Roberts	17,213	36.70%
Total votes		46,897	100.00%
Democratic hold			

=== District 10 ===
Incumbent Democratic state senator Gary Winfield was re-elected to a second full term. Winfield, who ran unopposed, was also nominated by the Working Families Party, and had represented the 10th district since a 2014 February special election.

2016 Connecticut State Senate election, District 10
Party	Candidate	Votes	%
Democratic	Gary Winfield	24,513	93.73%
Working Families	Gary Winfield	1,640	6.27%
Total	Gary Winfield (incumbent)	26,153	100%
Total votes		26,153	100.00%
Democratic hold			

=== District 11 ===
Incumbent Democratic state senator and President pro tempore of the Connecticut Senate Martin Looney was re-elected to an eighteenth term. Looney has represented the 11th district since 1993.

2016 Connecticut State Senate election, District 11
Party	Candidate	Votes	%
Democratic	Martin Looney (incumbent)	28,731	100%
Total votes		28,731	100.00%
Democratic hold			

=== District 12 ===
Incumbent Democratic state senator Edward M. Kennedy Jr. was re-elected to a second term, defeating Republican Board of Education member Bruce Wilson Jr. of Madison. Kennedy had also been nominated by the Working Families Party, while Wilson was also nominated by the Independent Party of Connecticut. Kennedy has represented the 12th district since 2015.

2016 Connecticut State Senate election, District 12
Party	Candidate	Votes	%
Democratic	Edward M. Kennedy Jr.	29,567	55.48%
Working Families	Edward M. Kennedy Jr.	2,522	4.73%
Total	Edward M. Kennedy Jr. (incumbent)	32,089	60.21%
Republican	Bruce Wilson Jr.	20,430	38.33%
Independent Party	Bruce Wilson Jr.	778	1.46%
Total	Bruce Wilson Jr.	21,208	39.79%
Total votes		53,297	100.00%
Democratic hold			

=== District 13 ===
Former Republican state senator Len Suzio defeated incumbent Democratic state senator Danté Bartolomeo as she ran for a third term. Suzio, also nominated by the Independent Party of Connecticut, previously represented the 13th district following a 2011 special election until he was defeated by Bartolomeo in 2012. Bartolmeo, also nominated by the Working Families Party, had defeated Suzio in a rematch in 2014.

2016 Connecticut State Senate election, District 13
Party	Candidate	Votes	%
Republican	Len Suzio	20,318	47.66%
Independent Party	Len Suzio	1,443	3.39%
Total	Len Suzio	21,761	51.05%
Democratic	Danté Bartolomeo	19,487	45.72%
Working Families	Danté Bartolomeo	1,379	3.24%
Total	Danté Bartolomeo (incumbent)	20,866	48.96%
Total votes		53,297	100.00%
Republican gain from Democratic			

=== District 14 ===
Incumbent Democratic state senator Gayle Slossberg was re-elected to a seventh term, defeating Republican Board of Education member Pat Libero of West Haven. Slossberg, also nominated by the Independent Party of Connecticut, had represented the 14th district since 2005.

2016 Connecticut State Senate election, District 14
Party	Candidate	Votes	%
Democratic	Gayle Slossberg	24,413	51.52%
Independent Party	Gayle Slossberg	2,136	4.51%
Total	Gayle Slossberg (incumbent)	26,549	56.03%
Republican	Pat Libero	20,836	43.97%
Total votes		47,385	100.00%
Democratic hold			

=== District 15 ===
Incumbent Democratic state senator Joan Hartley was re-elected to a ninth term, defeating Independent Party of Connecticut nominee James Russell. Hartley had represented 15th since 2001.

2016 Connecticut State Senate election, District 15
Party	Candidate	Votes	%
Democratic	Joan Hartley (incumbent)	20,312	82.17%
Independent Party	James Russell	4,407	17.83%
Total votes		24,719	100.00%
Democratic hold			

=== District 16 ===
Incumbent Republican state senator Joe Markley was re-elected to a fourth consecutive (fifth overall) term, defeating zoning board of appeals member Ryan Rogers of Southington. Markley had also was nominated by the Independent Party of Connecticut, while Rogers was also nominated by the Working Families Party. Markley had represented the 16th district from 1985-87, and since 2011.

2016 Connecticut State Senate election, District 16
Party	Candidate	Votes	%
Republican	Joe Markley	28,114	59.09%
Independent Party	Joe Markley	1,496	3.14%
Total	Joe Markley (incumbent)	29,610	62.23%
Democratic	Ryan Rogers	16,423	34.52%
Working Families	Ryan Rogers	1,543	3.14%
Total	Ryan Rogers	17,966	37.66%
Total votes		47,576	100.00%
Republican hold			

=== District 17 ===
Republican nominee George Logan defeated twelve-term incumbent Joe Crisco in his re-election bid for a thirteenth term. Crisco, having represented the 17th district since 1993, had also been nominated by the Working Families Party, while Logan was also nominated by the Independent Party of Connecticut.

2016 Connecticut State Senate election, District 17
Party	Candidate	Votes	%
Republican	George Logan	19,628	46.32%
Independent Party	George Logan	1,974	4.66%
Total	George Logan	21,602	50.98%
Democratic	Joe Crisco	19,132	45.15%
Working Families	Joe Crisco	1,637	3.86%
Total	Joe Crisco (Incumbent)	20,769	49.01%
Total votes		42,371	100.00%
Republican gain from Democratic			

=== District 18 ===
Incumbent Democratic state senator Andrew M. Maynard retired after his fifth term representing the 18th district. Republican former Mayor of Groton and 2014 lieutenant governor nominee Heather Somers defeated former state representative Timothy Russell Bowles, of the 42nd district, to win her first term in the state senate. Somers had also been nominated by the Independent Party of Connecticut, while Bowles was also nominated by the Working Families Party.

2016 Connecticut State Senate election, District 18
Party	Candidate	Votes	%
Republican	Heather Somers	22,905	52.97%
Independent Party	Heather Somers	1,890	4.37%
Total	Heather Somers	24,795	57.34%
Democratic	Timothy Russell Bowles	16,987	39.28%
Working Families	Timothy Russell Bowles	1,460	3.38%
Total	Timothy Russell Bowles	18,447	42.66%
Total votes		43,242	100.00%
Republican gain from Democratic			

=== District 19 ===
Incumbent Democratic state senator Cathy Osten was re-elected to a third term, defeating Republican nominee Barbara Richardson Crouch. Osten had also been nominated by the Working Families Party, while Crouch also was nominated by the Independent Party of Connecticut. Osten had represented the 19th district since 2013.

2016 Connecticut State Senate election, District 19
Party	Candidate	Votes	%
Democratic	Cathy Osten	21,909	52.08%
Working Families	Cathy Osten	2,705	6.43%
Total	Cathy Osten (incumbent)	24,614	58.51%
Republican	Barbara Richardson Crouch	16,244	38.62%
Independent Party	Barbara Richardson Crouch	1,208	2.87%
Total	Barbara Richardson Crouch	17,452	41.49%
Total votes		42,066	100.00%
Democratic hold			

=== District 20 ===
Incumbent Republican state senator Paul Formica was re-elected to a second term, defeating Democratic nominee Ryan Henowitz. Formica had also been nominated by the Independent Party of Connecticut, while Henowitz was also nominated by the Working Families Party. Formica had represented the 20th district since 2015.

2016 Connecticut State Senate election, District 20
Party	Candidate	Votes	%
Republican	Paul Formica	24,408	55.14%
Independent Party	Paul Formica	2,093	4.73%
Total	Paul Formica (incumbent)	26,501	59.87%
Democratic	Ryan Henowitz	16,429	37.12%
Working Families	Ryan Henowitz	1,332	3.01%
Total	Ryan Henowitz	17,761	40.13%
Total votes		44,262	100.00%
Republican hold			

=== District 21 ===
Incumbent Republican state senator Kevin C. Kelly was re-elected to a fourth term, defeating Democratic nominee Prez Palmer. Kelly, who previously defeated Palmer in 2014, had represented the 21st district since 2011.

2016 Connecticut State Senate election, District 21
Party	Candidate	Votes	%
Republican	Kevin C. Kelly (incumbent)	30,966	65.15%
Democratic	Prez Palmer	16,561	34.85%
Total votes		47,527	100.00%
Republican hold			

=== District 22 ===
Incumbent Democratic state senator Marilyn Moore was re-elected to a second term, defeating former state representative Elaine Hammers of the 123rd district. Moore had also been nominated by the Working Families Party, while Hammers, who served in the Connecticut House of Representatives from 1997-99, was also nominated by the Independent Party of Connecticut. Moore had represented the 22nd district since 2015.

2016 Connecticut State Senate election, District 22
Party	Candidate	Votes	%
Democratic	Marilyn Moore	21,075	53.82%
Working Families	Marilyn Moore	1,196	3.05%
Total	Marilyn Moore (incumbent)	22,271	56.87%
Republican	Elaine Hammers	16,149	41.24%
Independent Party	Elaine Hammers	736	1.88%
Total	Elaine Hammers	16,885	43.12%
Total votes		39,156	100.00%
Democratic hold			

=== District 23 ===
Incumbent Democratic state senator Ed Gomes was elected to a full term, defeating Bridgeport Republican Party Chairman Mike Garrett. Gomes, who had also been nominated by the Working Families Party, previously represented the 23rd district from 2005-2013, before losing to Andres Ayala in the Democratic primary for the seat in 2012. Following Ayala's appointment as the director of Connecticut Department of Motor Vehicles, Gomes won the 2015 special election for the 23rd district as the nominee of the Working Families Party.

2016 Connecticut State Senate election, District 23
Party	Candidate	Votes	%
Democratic	Ed Gomes	18,792	84.38%
Working Families	Ed Gomes	897	4.03%
Total	Ed Gomes (incumbent)	19,689	88.41%
Republican	Mike Garrett	2,583	11.60%
Total votes		22,272	100.00%
Democratic hold			

=== District 24 ===
Incumbent Republican state senator Michael A. McLachlan was re-elected to a fifth term, defeating Democratic Kenneth Gucker. McLachlan had also been nominated by the Independent Party of Connecticut, while Gucker was also nominated by the Working Families Party. McLachlan had represented the 24th district since 2009.

2016 Connecticut State Senate election, District 24
Party	Candidate	Votes	%
Republican	Michael A. McLachlan	19,496	49.68%
Independent Party	Michael A. McLachlan	1,005	2.56%
Total	Michael A. McLachlan (incumbent)	20,501	52.24%
Democratic	Kenneth Gucker	17,622	44.90%
Working Families	Kenneth Gucker	1,123	2.86%
Total	Kenneth Gucker	18,745	47.76%
Total votes		39,246	100.00%
Republican hold			

=== District 25 ===
Incumbent Democratic state senator and Majority Leader of the Connecticut State Senate Bob Duff was re-elected to a seventh term, defeating Republican nominee Gregory Ehlers, who had also been nominated by the Independent Party of Connecticut. Duff had represented the 25th district since 2005.

2016 Connecticut State Senate election, District 25
Party	Candidate	Votes	%
Democratic	Bob Duff (incumbent)	26,509	60.14%
Republican	Gregory Ehlers	16,632	37.73%
Independent Party	Gregory Ehlers	941	2.13%
Total	Gregory Ehlers	17,773	39.86%
Total votes		44,282	100.00%
Democratic hold			

=== District 26 ===
Incumbent Republican state senator Toni Boucher was re-elected to a fifth term, defeating Democratic nominee Carolanne Curry, who previously lost to Boucher in 2012. Boucher had represented the 26th district since 2009.

2016 Connecticut State Senate election, District 26
Party	Candidate	Votes	%
Republican	Toni Boucher (incumbent)	26,509	60.14%
Democratic	Carolanne Curry	22,898	39.81%
Total votes		49,407	100.00%
Republican hold			

=== District 27 ===
Incumbent Democratic state senator Carlo Leone was re-elected to a third full term, defeating Republican nominee Gino C. Bottino, who had also been nominated by the Independent Party of Connecticut, and Green Party nominee Cora Marie Santaguida. Leone had represented the 27th district since a 2011 February special election.

2016 Connecticut State Senate election, District 27
Party	Candidate	Votes	%
Democratic	Carlo Leone (incumbent)	24,149	65.24%
Republican	Gino C. Bottino	11,442	30.91%
Independent Party	Gino C. Bottino	551	1.49%
Total	Gino C. Bottino	11,993	32.40%
Green	Cora Marie Santaguida	874	2.36%
Total votes		37,016	100.00%
Democratic hold			

=== District 28 ===
Incumbent Republican state senator Tony Hwang was re-elected to a second term, defeating Democratic Chairman of the Fairfield Board of Education, Philip Dwyer. Hwang had also been nominated by the Independent Party of Connecticut, while Dwyer was also nominated by the Working Families Party. Hwang had represented the 28th district since 2015.

2016 Connecticut State Senate election, District 28
Party	Candidate	Votes	%
Republican	Tony Hwang	30,990	57.28%
Independent Party	Tony Hwang	1,669	3.09%
Total	Tony Hwang (incumbent)	32,659	60.37%
Democratic	Phillip Dwyer	20,457	37.81%
Working Families	Phillip Dwyer	984	1.82%
Total	Phillip Dwyer	21,441	39.63%
Total votes		54,100	100.00%
Republican hold			

=== District 29 ===
Incumbent Democratic state senator Mae Flexer was re-elected to a second term, defeating Republican nominee John French, who previously lost the 29th district state senate race against Flexer in 2014. Flexer had also been nominated by the Working Families Party, while French was also nominated by the Independent Party of Connecticut. Flexer had represented the 29th district since 2015.

2016 Connecticut State Senate election, District 29
Party	Candidate	Votes	%
Democratic	Mae Flexer	20,237	50.02%
Working Families	Mae Flexer	1,943	4.80%
Total	Mae Flexer (Incumbent)	22,180	54.82%
Republican	John French	16,718	41.32%
Independent Party	John French	1,562	3.86%
Total	John French	18,280	45.18%
Total votes		40,460	100.00%
Democratic hold			

=== District 30 ===
Incumbent Republican state senator Clark Chapin retired after two terms representing the 30th. Republican state representative, from the 66th district, since 2009, Craig Miner, defeated Democratic and Working Families Party nominee David Lawson. Miner also had been nominated by the Independent Party of Connecticut.

2016 Connecticut State Senate election, District 30
Party	Candidate	Votes	%
Republican	Craig Miner	25,295	53.01%
Independent Party	Craig Miner	1,381	2.89%
Total	Craig Miner	26,676	55.90%
Democratic	David Lawson	19,511	40.89%
Working Families	David Lawson	1,531	3.21%
Total	David Lawson	21,042	44.10%
Total votes		47,718	100.00%
Republican hold			

=== District 31 ===
Incumbent Republican state senator Henri Martin was re-elected to a second term, defeating Democratic former president of the Central Connecticut Chambers of Commerce Michael Nicastro. Martin, who had also been nominated by the Independent Party of Connecticut, had represented the 31st district since 2015.

2016 Connecticut State Senate election, District 31
Party	Candidate	Votes	%
Republican	Henri Martin	25,607	56.63%
Independent Party	Henri Martin	1,555	3.44%
Total	Henri Martin (Incumbent)	27,162	60.07%
Democratic	Michael Nicastro	18,053	39.93%
Total votes		45,215	100.00%
Republican hold			

=== District 32 ===
Incumbent Republican state senator Rob Kane was re-elected to a fourth term, defeating Democratic and Working Families Party nominee Greg Cava. Kane had represented the 32nd district since 2009, but resigned before the start of his newly elected term after being appointed to the position of Auditor of Public Accountants, leading to a 2017 February special election.

2016 Connecticut State Senate election, District 32
Party	Candidate	Votes	%
Republican	Rob Kane (Incumbent)	33,090	65.93%
Democratic	Greg Cava	15,697	31.28%
Working Families	Greg Cava	1,402	2.79%
Total	Greg Cava	17,099	35.07%
Total votes		50,189	100.00%
Republican hold			

=== District 33 ===
Incumbent Republican state senator Art Linares was re-elected to a third term, defeating Democratic First Selectman of Essex Norman Needleman and Green nominee Colin Bennet, who previously lost this seat in 2010 and 2014. Linares had also been nominated by the Independent Party of Connecticut, and had represented the 33rd district since 2013.

2016 Connecticut State Senate election, District 33
Party	Candidate	Votes	%
Republican	Art Linares	29,805	53.70%
Independent Party	Art Linares	1,789	3.22%
Total	Art Linares (Incumbent)	27,162	56.92%
Democratic	Norman Needleman	22,954	41.36%
Green	Colin Bennett	954	1.72%
Total votes		51,070	100.00%
Republican hold			

=== District 34 ===
Incumbent Republican state senator and Minority Leader of the Connecticut State Senate Len Fasano was re-elected to an eighth term, defeating write-in nominees David Bedell and Andrew Rule. Fasano had also been nominated by the Independent Party of Connecticut, and had represented the 34th district since 2003.

2016 Connecticut State Senate election, District 34
Party	Candidate	Votes	%
Republican	Len Fasano	30,312	86.46%
Independent Party	Len Fasano	4,737	13.51%
Total	Len Fasano (Incumbent)	35,049	99.97%
Write-In	David Bedell	11	0.03%
Write-In	Andrew Rule	1	0.00%
Total votes		35,061	100.00%
Republican hold			

=== District 35 ===
Incumbent Republican state senator Tony Guglielmo was re-elected to an eighteenth term, defeating Democratic and Working Families Party nominee Arlene Avery, a former nominee for state representative. Guglielmo had represented the 35th district since 1993.

2016 Connecticut State Senate election, District 35
Party	Candidate	Votes	%
Republican	Tony Guglielmo (Incumbent)	31,829	62.38%
Democratic	Arlene Avery	17,238	33.78%
Working Families	Arlene Avery	1,961	3.84%
Total	Arlene Avery	19,199	35.07%
Total votes		51,028	100.00%
Republican hold			

=== District 36 ===
Incumbent Republican state senator Scott Frantz was re-elected to a fifth term, defeating Democratic nominee John Blankley and Green Party nominee Edward Heflin. Frantz had represented the 36th district since 2009.

2016 Connecticut State Senate election, District 36
Party	Candidate	Votes	%
Republican	Scott Frantz (Incumbent)	28,901	58.98%
Democratic	John Blankley	19,291	39.37%
Green	Edward Heflin	811	1.66%
Total votes		49,903	100.00%
Republican hold			
