= 2015 Connecticut Senate 23rd district special election =

2015 Connecticut State Senate 23rd district special election
- February 24, 2015

Connecticut State Senate 23rd district
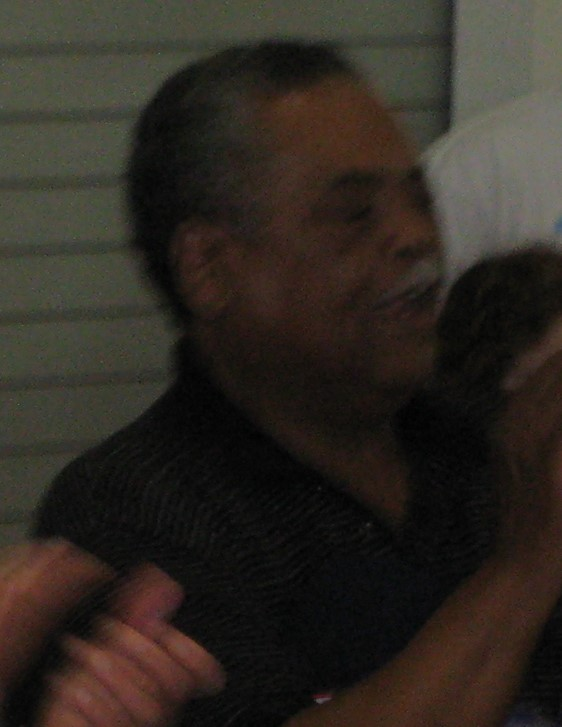

Nominee	Ed Gomes	Richard DeJesus
Party	Working Families	Democratic
Popular vote	1,485	791
Percentage	48.82%	26.00%
Nominee	Kenneth H. Moales Jr.	Quentin Dreher
Party	Independent	Republican
Popular vote	509	152
Percentage	16.73%	5.00%
Senator before election
Andres Ayala Jr.
Democratic
Elected Senator
Ed Gomes
Working Families

The 2015 Connecticut State Senate 23rd district special election was held on February 24, 2015, in order to fill Andres Ayala Jr.'s seat after he was appointed to be the director of the Connecticut Department of Motor Vehicles. Former Senator Ed Gomes, the nominee of the Connecticut Working Families Party, won the special election and regained the seat that he had held before Ayala Jr. had defeated him in the 2012 primary.

Gomes was the first person elected to a state legislature with only the nomination of the Working Families Party. He was also the first third-party candidate elected to the Connecticut state legislature since the Socialist Party of America elected four of its members to the state legislature in 1938.

== Background ==
Ed Gomes was elected to the Connecticut State Senate in a 2005 special election. Gomes served in the senate until he was defeated in the Democratic primary by Andres Ayala Jr., who went on to win in the 2012 and 2014 elections. However, Ayala Jr. resigned to become the director of the Connecticut Department of Motor Vehicles in 2015.

== Campaign ==
Richard DeJesus won the Democratic nomination on January 23, 2015, against Gomes after Edwin Farrow, who chaired the convention, broke a twenty-six to twenty-six tie between the two candidates. Gomes' campaign stated that Farrow should have recused himself from breaking the tie and accused the convention of having conflicts of interest, but a panel of the Democratic Party of Connecticut found nothing in their report.

Quentin Dreher won the Republican nomination at the nomination convention on January 12, but chair John Slater filed the certificate of endorsement too late for Dreher to appear on the ballot. Dreher filed a lawsuit to appear on the ballot and won. Gomes won the nomination of the Working Families Party and Kennard Ray served as his campaign manager. Kenneth Moales and Charles hare ran as independents.

During the campaign it was revealed that DeJesus owed $139,433 in back taxes and $35,700 in child support. Al Sharpton was supposed to appear at a voter registration event for Moales, but cancelled the event after Gomes' supporters reached out to Sharpton as they saw it as an endorsement of Moales.

Gomes' victory made him the first person elected to a state legislature with only the nomination of the Working Families Party; Lindsay Farrell, executive director of the Connecticut Working Families Party, stated that Gomes' victory was "a very big deal for us". Gomes was the first third-party candidate elected to the state legislature in Connecticut since the Socialist Party of America elected four members to the state legislature in 1938. Gomes later became a registered member of the Democratic Party and sought the Democratic nomination in the 2016 election.

== Results ==
2015 Connecticut State Senate 23rd district special election
Party	Candidate	Votes	%
Working Families	Ed Gomes	1,485	48.82%
Democratic	Richard DeJesus	791	26.00%
Independent	Kenneth H. Moales Jr.	509	16.73%
Republican	Quentin Dreher	152	5.00%
Independent	Charles E. Hare	105	3.45%
Total votes		3,042	100.00%

== Endorsements ==
Gomes endorsements

Organizations

- Mary McBride-Lee, member of the Bridgeport, Connecticut city council
