= Len Suzio =

American politician

Member of the Connecticut State Senate from the 13th district
- In office January 4, 2017 – January 9, 2019
- Preceded by: Danté Bartolomeo
- Succeeded by: Mary Abrams
- In office February 25, 2011 – January 4, 2013
- Preceded by: Thomas Gaffey
- Succeeded by: Danté Bartolomeo

Personal details
- Born: January 4, 1948 (age 78) Meriden, Connecticut, U.S.
- Party: Republican
- Spouse: Kathryn
- Children: 5
- Education: University of Pennsylvania (BS)

Leonard F. Suzio Jr. (born January 4, 1948) is an American politician from Connecticut. A Republican, he represented the 13th district in the Connecticut State Senate from 2017 to 2019, previously serving from 2011 to 2013.

== Personal life ==
Suzio attended the Wharton School of the University of Pennsylvania. Shortly after graduation, he married Kathryn. Suzio was active in the Connecticut Victim Advocate Advisory Committee, founded the consultancy firm GeoDataVision, and served on the Meriden Board of Education from 1995 to 2009.

== Political career ==
Suzio contested his first state legislative election in 2010, losing to incumbent state senator Thomas Gaffey. After Gaffey resigned after being charged with larceny, Suzio contested the subsequent special election for his seat. He defeated Democrat Thomas Bruenn in the special election and took office on February 28, 2011. His election made him the first Republican to be elected from the 13th district since 1972.

Suzio unsuccessfully ran for a full term in the 2012 election, losing to Democrat Danté Bartolomeo. He challenged Bartolomeo for a rematch in the 2014 election, but lost.

Suzio launched another campaign for the seat in 2016. In what was described as an upset victory by the New Haven Register, Suzio defeated Bartolomeo to reclaim his seat.

In May 2018, Suzio announced that he would run for a second consecutive term. He lost his 2018 re-election bid to Democrat Mary Daugherty Abrams.

Connecticut State Senate
Preceded by Thomas Gaffey	Member of the Connecticut State Senate from the 13th district 2011–2013	Succeeded by Danté Bartolomeo
Preceded by Danté Bartolomeo	Member of the Connecticut State Senate from the 13th district 2017–2019	Succeeded by Mary Abrams
