= Amelia Mustone =

American politician (1928–2019)

Member of the Connecticut Senate from the 13th district
- In office January 3, 1979 – January 4, 1995
- Preceded by: Louis Cutillo
- Succeeded by: Thomas Gaffey

Personal details
- Born: July 16, 1928 Salem, Massachusetts, U.S.
- Died: July 7, 2019 (aged 90) Meriden, Connecticut, U.S.
- Party: Democratic

Amelia Mustone (July 16, 1928 – July 7, 2019) was an American politician who served in the Connecticut Senate from the 13th district from 1979 to 1995.

Mustone died on July 7, 2019, in Meriden, Connecticut, at age 90.
