= Senator Hurley =

Senator Hurley may refer to:

- James R. Hurley (1932–2023), New Jersey State Senate
- Margaret Hurley (Connecticut politician) (1878–1975), Connecticut State Senate
- Margaret Hurley (Washington politician) (1909–2015), Washington State Senate
