= Margaret Hurley =

Margaret Hurley may refer to:

- Margaret Hurley (Connecticut politician) (1878–1975), American politician from Connecticut
- Margaret Hurley (Washington politician) (1909–2015), American politician from Washington
