= Louise Berry =

American politician (1927–2022)

Member of the Connecticut Senate from the 29th district
- In office 1973–1975
- Preceded by: Thomas E. Dupont
- Succeeded by: Audrey P. Beck

Personal details
- Born: Louise Spaulding; November 9, 1927
- Died: July 5, 2022 (aged 94)
- Party: Republican
- Spouse: Richard C. Berry (m. 1951; died 1992)
- Children: 5
- Education: Adelphi University (RN); University of Connecticut (B.A., M.A.); University of Connecticut School of Law (J.D.)

Louise Berry (November 9, 1927 – July 5, 2022) was an American politician who served in the Connecticut State Senate from 1973 to 1975, representing the 29th district as a Republican.

== Personal life and education ==
Berry was born Louise Spaulding on November 9, 1927. She attended Adelphi University, where she graduated with a degree in nursing, the University of Connecticut, where she graduated with a bachelor's degree in zoology and a master's degree in counseling, and the University of Connecticut School of Law, where she earned her Juris Doctor. Outside of her political career, she worked in education as a school nurse, guidance counselor, and Superintendent of Schools for the Brooklyn, Connecticut public school system. When she retired from her position as superintendent in 2016, she was the longest-serving school superintendent in Connecticut history.

Berry married her husband, Richard C. Berry, on June 9, 1951. Together, they had five children.

Berry died on July 5, 2022. She was 94.

== Political career ==
Berry was elected to the Connecticut State Senate in 1972, and she served one term representing the 29th district as a Republican. She ran for reelection in 1974, but was defeated by Democratic candidate Audrey P. Beck.

In 1978, Berry unsuccessfully ran for secretary of the state of Connecticut. She was defeated by Democratic candidate Barbara B. Kennelly.

In 1991, Governor Lowell Weicker appointed Berry to serve on the Connecticut Board of Trustees for Community Colleges, and in 2004, she was named chair of the board by Governor Jodi Rell. Berry served on the board until 2011, the year it was consolidated into the Connecticut Board of Regents for Higher Education.
