= Connecticut's 44th House of Representatives district =

American legislative district

Connecticut's 44th State House of Representatives district
Representative
| Anne Dauphinais; R |

Connecticut's 44th House of Representatives district elects one member of the Connecticut House of Representatives. Its current representative is Republican Anne Dauphinais. The district consists of parts of the towns of Killingly and Plainfield. The district's boundaries were radically changed in 2001: prior to the change, the district contained the entire towns of Canterbury and Plainfield, as well as part of Killingly.

== List of representatives ==
List of representatives from Connecticut's 44th State House district
| Representative | Party | Years | District home | Note |
|---|---|---|---|---|
| Peter A. Crombie | Democratic | 1967–1971 | Enfield | Seat created |
| Salbath M. Nigro | Democratic | 1971–1973 | Enfield | |
| Richard L. Mercier | Democratic | 1973–1983 | Plainfield | |
| Richard A. Gosselin | Democratic | 1983–1985 | Plainfield | |
| Geraldine Elliot | Republican | 1985–1987 | Danielson | |
| Richard A. Gosselin | Democratic | 1987–1991 | Plainfield | |
| Michael Caron | Republican | 1991–2009 | Killingly | Did not run for reelection |
| Mae Flexer | Democratic | 2009–2015 | Killingly | Retired to run for State Senate |
| Christine Rosati Randall | Democratic | 2015–2017 | Killingly | Defeated |
| Anne Dauphinais | Republican | 2017–present | Killingly | Incumbent |

== Recent elections ==
State Election 2008: House District 44
| Party | Candidate | Votes | % | ±% |
|---|---|---|---|---|
| Democratic | Mae Flexer | 6,015 | 67.6 | +32.3 |
| Republican | Angeline Kwasny | 2,879 | 32.4 | −32.3 |
| Majority | | 3,136 | 35.3 | +6.0 |
| Turnout | | 8,894 | | |
| Democratic gain from Republican | | Swing | +32.3 | |

State Election 2006: House District 44
| Party | Candidate | Votes | % | ±% |
|---|---|---|---|---|
| Republican | Michael Caron | 3,982 | 64.7 | +9.5 |
| Democratic | Donald F. Gladding | 2,176 | 35.3 | −9.5 |
| Majority | | 1,806 | 29.3 | +18.9 |
| Turnout | | 6,158 | | |
| Republican hold | | Swing | +9.5 | |

State Election 2004: House District 44
| Party | Candidate | Votes | % | ±% |
|---|---|---|---|---|
| Republican | Michael Caron | 5,964 | 55.2 | −2.6 |
| Democratic | Charles P. Ferland | 4,843 | 44.8 | +2.6 |
| Majority | | 1,121 | 10.4 | −5.1 |
| Turnout | | 10,807 | | |
| Republican hold | | Swing | -2.6 | |

State Election 2002: House District 44
| Party | Candidate | Votes | % | ±% |
|---|---|---|---|---|
| Republican | Michael Caron | 3,284 | 57.8 | −35.6 |
| Democratic | Dale P. Clark | 2,401 | 42.2 | +42.2 |
| Majority | | 883 | 15.5 | −71.8 |
| Turnout | | 5,685 | | |
| Republican hold | | Swing | -39.5 | |

State Election 2000: House District 44
| Party | Candidate | Votes | % | ±% |
|---|---|---|---|---|
| Republican | Michael Caron | 5,260 | 93.6 | +29.8 |
| Libertarian | Sandra L. Cote | 357 | 6.4 | +6.4 |
| Majority | | 4,903 | 87.3 | +63.1 |
| Turnout | | 5,617 | | |
| Republican hold | | Swing | +23.4 | |

State Election 1998: House District 44
| Party | Candidate | Votes | % | ±% |
|---|---|---|---|---|
| Republican | Michael Caron | 3,818 | 63.8 | |
| Democratic | Tracy M. Dooley | 2,169 | 36.2 | |
| Majority | | 1,449 | 24.2 | |
| Turnout | | 5,987 | | |
| Republican hold | | Swing | | |
