= Audrey P. Beck =

American politician and educator (1931–1983)

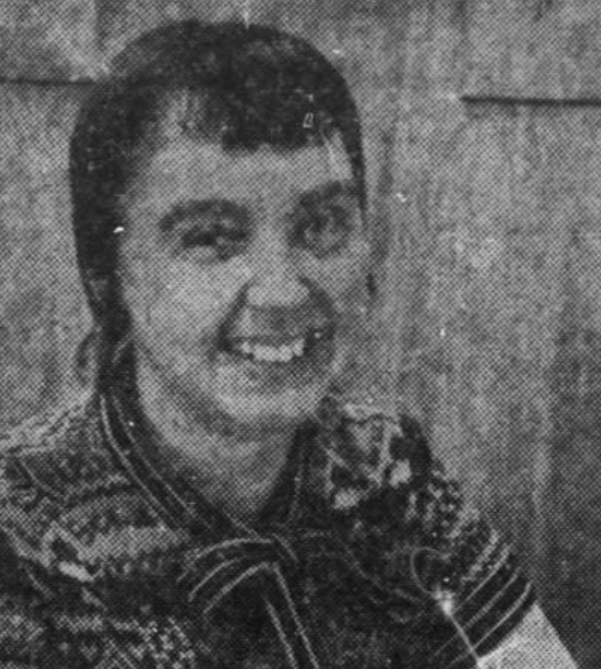

Member of the Connecticut Senate from the 29th district
- In office 1975–1983
- Preceded by: Louise Berry
- Succeeded by: Kevin P. Johnston

Member of the Connecticut House of Representatives from the 54th district
- In office 1973–1975
- Preceded by: Charles C. Grab
- Succeeded by: Dorothy Goodwin

Member of the Connecticut House of Representatives from the 50th district
- In office 1969–1973
- Preceded by: Foster H. Richards
- Succeeded by: Morton J. Blumenthal

Personal details
- Born: August 6, 1931 Brooklyn, New York, U.S.
- Died: March 11, 1983 (aged 51) Willington, Connecticut, U.S.
- Party: Democratic
- Education: University of Connecticut

Audrey Phillips Beck (August 6, 1931 – March 11, 1983) was an American politician and educator.

== Personal life ==
Born in Brooklyn, New York, Beck moved with her family to Norwalk, Connecticut, where she grew up. Beck received her bachelor's and master's degrees from University of Connecticut. From 1961 to 1967, Beck taught economics at the University of Connecticut. She was also a visiting professor at Rutgers University. In 1967, Beck worked as an economist for the Windham Regional Planning Commission.

== Political career ==
From 1969 to 1975, Beck served in the Connecticut House of Representatives. When in the Connecticut House, she was one of sixteen women legislators (of a body of 177) and, together with her friend and colleague Nancy Griswold, originated legislation providing improved equality for women in the legislature and in the workplace. She began a 16 year quest to introduce a state income tax in Connecticut, which was quite controversial, and did not pass the legislature during her years. She believed strongly in what she called "fiscal responsibility," towards which she argued that the existing and quite high state sales tax was a regressive tax, putting a significantly higher proportional burden on lower income citizens.

She then served in the Connecticut State Senate from 1975 until her death in 1983. While in the CT Senate, Beck became the Chairman of the Finance Committee of the Senate, which made her the most important figure, together with Governors Ella Grasso and Governor William O'Neill, in setting the annual budget for the State of Connecticut. When in the CT Senate, she was one of four women senators (of a body of 36). Her district, representing Northeastern Connecticut, is the largest in area of the senate districts.

Probably her most significant contribution as a state legislator was the quite significant increase in funding she was instrumental in obtaining for the University of Connecticut during her 16 years. This increase in funding levels for UConn were pivotal in increasing the resources, quality, and prominence of that University.

Beck lived in Storrs, Connecticut, and became a consultant for the insurance business Cigna Corporation after she divorced and needed an income aside from the trivial amount that state senators were paid annually (less than $5000). At Cigna, Beck was responsible for community grants, as Cigna had a significant community give-back program. Beck, as a prominent woman legislator in the 70s and 80s, was under the kind of public microscope now commonly seen by prominent women on social media. She killed herself by slashing her wrists in a wooded area in Willington, Connecticut.
