= Eileen Daily =

American politician (1943–2015)

Member of the Connecticut Senate from the 33rd district
- In office 1993–2013
- Preceded by: Edward W. Munster
- Succeeded by: Art Linares

Personal details
- Born: March 3, 1943 Boston, Massachusetts, U.S.
- Died: July 30, 2015 (aged 72) Branford, Connecticut, U.S.
- Party: Democratic

Eileen Meade Daily (March 3, 1943 – July 30, 2015) was an American politician who served in the Connecticut Senate from 1993 to 2013.

Daily was born in Boston on March 3, 1943. She was raised in Dorchester, and moved to Westbrook, Connecticut, in 1974. From 1983 to 1989, Daily was a member of the Westbrook Board of Education. She subsequently served on the board of selectmen until 1991, when she was elected first selectwomen of Westbrook. Daily was first elected to the Connecticut Senate from district 33 in 1992. Following her lung cancer diagnosis, Daily announced in May 2012 that she would not stand for reelection later that year.

Daily died of lung cancer at the Connecticut Hospice in Branford on July 30, 2015. Westbrook station was rededicated in March 2017 in Daily's honor.
