= Reece Painter =

American politician

Member of the Connecticut House of Representatives from the 50th district
- In office November 2004 – January 2005
- Preceded by: Jefferson B. Davis
- Succeeded by: Mike Alberts

Personal details
- Party: Democratic
- Children: 4
- Education: Earlham College; DePauw University

Esther Reece Painter is an American politician who served in the Connecticut House of Representatives from 2004 to 2005, representing the 50th district as a Democrat.

Painter was elected in a November 2004 special election to fill the vacancy left by Representative Jefferson B. Davis' resignation. The election was held concurrently with the 2004 general election, and voters chose between the same two candidates in both: Painter and Republican Mike Alberts. While Painter was elected to serve the remainder of Davis' term, Alberts was elected to succeed her in a full two-year term beginning in January 2005.
