= Mary Abrams =

American politician (1958–2025)

Mary Daugherty Abrams

Member of the Connecticut State Senate from the 13th district
- In office January 9, 2019 – January 4, 2023
- Preceded by: Len Suzio
- Succeeded by: Jan Hochadel

Personal details
- Born: December 13, 1958 Meriden, Connecticut, U.S.
- Died: January 2, 2025 (aged 66) Meriden, Connecticut, U.S
- Party: Democratic
- Spouse: Jim
- Children: 2
- Education: Southern Connecticut State University
- Profession: School administrator
- Website: www.senatedems.ct.gov/abrams-190122

Mary Daugherty Abrams (December 13, 1958 – January 2, 2025) was an American politician. She was a representative in the Connecticut State Senate from the 13th district from 2020 to 2022. Abrams stated that she would not run for reelection in 2022. She was a member of the Democratic Party.

== Personal life and death ==
Abrams was born in Meriden, Connecticut, on December 13, 1958. She was a special education teacher who resided in Meriden for more than 40 years. She had both a graduate and undergraduate degree from Southern Connecticut State University. She was married to James W. Abrams, a judge and former member of the Connecticut House of Representatives.

Abrams died from glioblastoma on January 2, 2025, 20 days after her 66th birthday.

Connecticut State Senate
Preceded by Len Suzio	State Senator of the 13th district 2018–2021	Succeeded by Jan Hochadel
