= Myrtle Perri Gutmann =

American politician (died 2002)

Member of the Connecticut House of Representatives from the 123rd district
- In office 1967–1969
- Preceded by: Seat created
- Succeeded by: James S. Connery

Member of the Connecticut House of Representatives from Shelton
- In office 1959–1967 Serving with Dean F. Taylor
- Preceded by: Bronislaw Winnick; Clinton B. Taylor
- Succeeded by: Seat eliminated

Personal details
- Born: Myrtle Reynolds; 1912 or 1913
- Died: September 2, 2002 (aged 89) Fairfax, Virginia, U.S.
- Party: Democratic
- Children: 3

Myrtle "Terri" Perri Gutmann (1912 or 1913 – September 2, 2002), also known as Terri Perri, was an American politician who served in the Connecticut House of Representatives from 1959 to 1969. A Democrat, Gutmann represented the town of Shelton from 1959 to 1967, and the 123rd district from 1967 to 1969.

== Career ==
Gutmann at the Connecticut State Capitol in 1967

Gutmann was the Democratic candidate for the 25th district of the Connecticut State Senate in 1956. She was defeated by Republican incumbent Newman M. Marsilius Jr.

In 1958, Gutmann was elected to the Connecticut House of Representatives. She represented the town of Shelton alongside fellow Democrat Dean F. Taylor until 1967.

In 1966, following a redistricting in which Connecticut eliminated its single-town districts, Gutmann was elected to represent the newly created 123rd district. She served on the Water Resource and Flood Control Committee and the Corrections Committee, and she chaired the Public Health and Safety Committee. In the 1967 session, she was the only woman to chair a House committee. She ran for reelection in 1968, but was defeated by Republican candidate James S. Connery.

== Personal life ==
Gutmann with her paintings

Myrtle Reynolds was born in 1912 or 1913 to Cleveland H. and Margaret Reynolds. Her father was in the Army, and during Myrtle's childhood, he was stationed at Fort Terry on Plum Island in Southold, New York. She grew up on the island and took a ferry to attend school in New London, Connecticut. She did not graduate high school, but earned her GED after retiring from politics.

On September 26, 1930, she married her first husband, Harry R. Clark. They had two daughters together, Marion and Janice. They divorced around 1940. On September 29, 1945, she married Ernest Mann Sangree. They had a son, Ernest, together.

On December 15, 1952, she married Frank G. Perri, an engineering inspector who worked for the Connecticut Highway Department. They were married until Frank's death in 1964. In 1965, she married Frederick G. Gutmann. He died in 1970.

Gutmann was a descendant of English painter Joshua Reynolds and was interested in realist painting. She belonged to the Connecticut Classic Arts, a group that promoted realistic art.

== Death ==
Gutmann died of complications of pneumonia on September 2, 2002, in Fairfax, Virginia. She was 89.
