= Terry Concannon =

American politician (born 1940)

Member of the Connecticut House of Representatives from the 34th district
- In office January 6, 1993 – January 6, 1999
- Preceded by: Dean Markham
- Succeeded by: Gail Hamm

Personal details
- Born: May 21, 1940 (age 86)
- Party: Democratic

Terry Concannon (born May 21, 1940) is an American politician who served in the Connecticut House of Representatives from the 34th district from 1993 to 1999.
