= Melissa Ziobron =

American politician

Member of the Connecticut House of Representatives from the 34th district
- In office January 9, 2013 – January 9, 2019
- Preceded by: Gail Hamm
- Succeeded by: Irene Haines

Personal details
- Born: East Hampton, Connecticut, U.S.
- Party: Republican
- Spouse: Scott
- Education: Attended Central Connecticut State University

Melissa H. Ziobron is the former state representative for the 34th District of the Connecticut House of Representatives. She was first elected in November 2012, succeeding Democrat Gail Hamm, who did not seek re-election. She lost her 2018 bid to advance to a higher position in the state Senate.

== Biography ==
Melissa grew up in East Hampton, Connecticut, attending its public schools. She graduated from Nathan Hale-Ray High School and then attended Central Connecticut State University.

== Career ==
Prior to holding elected office, Melissa has held numerous positions in public service. She has been President of Gillette Castle State Park, East Haddam Economic Development Coordinator, a member of the Middlesex Chamber Revitalization Commission, member of the East Haddam Board of Education and member of the Finance, Policy and Open Space Committee.

== Political career ==
Melissa was elected to the open seat for the 34th district in the Connecticut House of Representatives in November 2012, assuming office in January 2013. In her first term, she proposed legislation in support of Sunrise State Park, which had been decaying and heavily vandalized. She also supported a study for the economic impact of legalizing industrial hemp production.

In her second term, as the leading Republican lawmaker on the Connecticut General Assembly's budget writing committee, she has been vocal in her strong opposition to the biennial budget passed by the democrat dominated General Assembly. She also supported reforms to campaign finance laws, capping organizational expenditures by state political parties, reducing individual donor limits and preventing candidates in unopposed races from receiving public campaign financing.

On February 7, 2018, she announced that she would not seek reelection as a state representative and would be seeking the state senate seat for the 33rd District. She lost the race to Democrat Norm Needleman. The seat was being vacated by Senator Art Linares, who also lost his bid for the office of Connecticut State Treasurer.

=== Election history ===
Year	Office	District	Democratic		Republican	
2012	Connecticut State Representative	34th	Christopher Goff	45.1%	Melissa Ziobron	54.9%
2014	Connecticut State Representative	34th	Mimi Perrotti	30.0%	Melissa Ziobron	70.0%
2016	Connecticut State Representative	34th	NO CANDIDATE		Melissa Ziobron	100.0%
2018	Connecticut State Senate	33rd	Norm Needleman		Melissa Ziobron	

== Personal life ==
Melissa has been married to her husband, Scott for over two decades and have two children. She is also an owner of hound dogs.
