= Thomas Gaffey =

American politician (born 1958)

Thomas P. Gaffey

Member of the Connecticut Senate from the 13th district
- In office 1995 – January 5, 2011
- Preceded by: Amelia Mustone
- Succeeded by: Len Suzio
- Constituency: Cheshire, Meriden, Middlefield and Middletown

Personal details
- Born: January 10, 1958 (age 68) Meriden, Connecticut, U.S.
- Party: Democratic

Thomas P. Gaffey (born January 10, 1958) is an American politician. Gaffey, a Democrat, was a member of the Connecticut State Senate from 1995 to 2011, when he left office due to criminal violations.

Gaffey, a resident of Meriden, has represented the towns of Cheshire, Meriden, Middlefield and Middletown in the Connecticut Senate.

Gaffey was born in Meriden and graduated from Southern Connecticut State University. He was appointed in the fall of 2005 to serve as Chief Deputy Majority Leader by Senate Majority Leader Martin Looney and Senate President Pro Tempore Donald E. Williams Jr., and previously served in the position.

Gaffey also serves as an executive with the Connecticut Resources Recovery Authority. In 2002, he was linked to meetings with failed energy firm Enron. He was also cited that year for spending over $10,000 in personal expenses on his authority expense account, and failing to make timely reimbursement, but later issued a CRRA check for more than $1,600 to repay amounts reimbursed in excess.

In January 2009 the Hartford Courant announced state auditors were looking into other instances of improper reimbursement by Gaffey, including double billing of out of state travel to both the state government and his political action committee. On January 18, the Courant urged the State Senate to censure Gaffey for his ethical improprieties.

On May 6, 2009, the State Election Enforcement Commission announced that Gaffey and his campaign treasurer had agreed to a settlement over the double billing complaint. In one of the largest fines levied by the Commission, Gaffey agreed to a $6,000 fine and his treasurer agreed to a $3,000 fine. Gaffey also agreed to dissolve his political action committee and forfeit its $20,000 balance to the state. The commission's enforcement director called Gaffey's record keeping "disastrous". The charges later led to a criminal investigation and Gaffey's resignation.

In 2006 Gaffey supported legislation spearheaded by fellow Democrat Donald Williams intended to address childhood obesity in Connecticut. The legislation was however derided by opponents as the "cupcake bill." As of August 2008, more than 63% of eligible school districts have enrolled in the program.

In March 2008 New Haven schools enforced this policy by suspending an eighth grader for selling a classmate skittles. In May 2008, a principal in Greenwich was suspended in a dispute over bringing cupcakes to school.

In 2007 Gaffey proposed that the Governor's power to appoint the Commissioner of Education be limited. Allies of Governor Jodi Rell labelled the proposal an attempted power grab. That year Gaffey also opposed efforts to increase education aid to suburban school districts, even those represented by fellow Democrats, in favor of adding more funds to urban districts. His response to complaints from suburban legislators was "Like everything else in those districts, that is rich!" Gaffey has also clashed with leaders of his local school board over the installation of artificial turf.

In November 2007 Gaffey suggested that the state had to impose a more stringent school integration plan on suburbs in the Hartford region. "The notion that we're going to get a better result by voluntary programs is ridiculous," said state Sen. Thomas Gaffey, D-Meriden, co-chairman of the legislature's education committee. "We need to shift away from the model of remedy that the state has been pursuing for years. The district is as racially isolated today as it was 10 years ago. It suggests you need to do something different."

Another Gaffey initiative was a bill that banned most out-of-school suspensions. Educators were unsure how they could comply with the law.

In 2008 Gaffey did break with party leadership to support a Three Strikes Law to give life sentences to career violent criminals supported by Governor M. Jodi Rell.

Thomas P. Gaffey was the father of three children. His son, Thomas M. Gaffey died on February 2, 2009, at the age of 16. In 2005 the Connecticut Appellate Court denied the Senator's ex-wife's request for increased child support.

== CSU bonding scandal ==
On December 2, 2007, Hartford Courant columnist Kevin Rennie detailed Gaffey's efforts on behalf of a billion dollar bonding proposal from the Connecticut State University system; which he promoted while being romantically involved with the university administrator lobbying for the proposal. Much of Rennie's story detailed personal communication between Gaffey and his girlfriend over state e-mail accounts. On December 3, 2007, Senate Minority Leader John McKinney and Republican State Chairman Chris Healy demanded an investigation into whether Gaffey's conduct violated state ethics rules. The Democratic senate caucus was split on the need to investigate, with Fairfield County Democrats Andrew McDonald and Bob Duff suggesting an investigation was needed, while Senate President Donald E. Williams Jr. flatly rejected the idea. On December 7, the Hartford Courant's editorial page called on Gaffey to be censured for his role in this affair, despite a letter from the Office of State Ethics refuting all conflict of interest allegations.

Both Gaffey and Rennie had stories in the December 9, 2007, Courant. Gaffey said there had been nothing improper in his relationship with the university lobbyist, citing his record of support for state colleges. Rennie's article alleged self-dealing by Gaffey, including getting Final Four basketball tickets from the university at a low price and using his political action committee to pay personal expenses.

On December 11, Democratic senators proposed ethics reforms for the legislature. They denied it was done in response to the Gaffey scandal. On December 14, Gaffey asked Williams to be reassigned off the committee responsible for oversight of CSU. One Democratic senator, Edith Prague, defended Gaffey, asserting "He didn't steal anything".

Republican Tim Lenox is challenging Gaffey in the November 2008 election but was defeated by Gaffey. Following the election, Gaffey's ally, Senate President Donald E. Williams Jr., removed Senator Joan Hartley from chairmanship of the Higher Education Committee, a move viewed as retaliation for opposing Gaffey's bonding proposals.

== Conviction and resignation ==
In June 2009 the State Election Enforcement Commission fined Gaffey for a double billing scandal involving his political action committee, the GAFPAC. Gaffey ran for re-election in 2010 and despite the scandal, defeated Republican Len Suzio.

After the election the State's Attorney's office continued its investigation into whether Gaffey violated criminal statutes. On January 3, 2011 Gaffey was arrested for larceny. He resolved the criminal charges by agreeing to plead guilty to a misdemeanor, with no jail time, resign his state senate seat effective January 5, 2011, and serve 100 hours of community service. On January 5, 2011 Gaffey submitted his resignation to Secretary of the State Susan Bysiewicz and submitted his plea to Superior Court Judge Julia Dewey, who accepted the plea agreement.

Preceded by Amelia Mustone	Connecticut Senator from the Thirteenth District; 1995–2011	Succeeded by Leonard Suzio
