= Pat Boyd =

American politician (born 1981)

- Boyd in 2023

Member of the Connecticut House of Representatives from the 50th district
- Incumbent
- Assumed office January 4, 2017
- Preceded by: Mike Alberts

Personal details
- Born: Patrick S. Boyd; January 28, 1981 (age 45) Norwich, Connecticut, U.S.
- Party: Democratic
- Education: Eastern Connecticut State University (BA); Sacred Heart University (MA)
- Occupation: Educator; politician
- Awards: Eagle Scout, Distinguished Service Award, Silver Beaver Award, Outstanding Eagle Scout Award, Kentucky Colonel
- Website: Official Website

Patrick S. Boyd (born January 28, 1981) is an educator and American politician who is a member of the Connecticut House of Representatives, serving since 2017. He represents the Towns of Ashford, Brooklyn, Eastford, Hampton, Mansfield, Pomfret, and Woodstock composing the Connecticut's 50th House of Representatives district of the Connecticut General Assembly. Boyd is currently the House Chairman of the Public Safety & Security Committee.

== Early life and education ==
Born in Norwich, Boyd is a Plainfield, Connecticut native, raised in Moosup where he attended local public schools and graduated from Plainfield High School. He earned a bachelor's degree in history & social science from Eastern Connecticut State University and later earned a master's degree from Sacred Heart University where he was admitted to the Pi Lambda Theta. As a youth, Boyd earned the rank of Eagle Scout and was active in Scouting's National Honor Society, the Order of the Arrow where he was recognized with the Vigil Honor and the Distinguished Service Award.

== Professional career ==
Boyd's career in education began at the Sterling Memorial School in Oneco. He then joined the faculty of the Rectory School in Pomfret, teaching history, English, leadership, and outdoor education. In 2006, he was appointed to the faculty of the Pomfret School, an independent, coeducational, college preparatory boarding school in Pomfret, where he currently serves as the associate dean of students and as a history/government teacher. Boyd serves as the summer camp director of Scouting America's June Norcross Webster Scout Reservation in Ashford.

== Public service career ==
He began his public service career serving on the Charter Revision Commission in Plainfield while a student at Eastern Connecticut State University. After moving to Pomfret, he joined the Pomfret Volunteer Fire Department, later serving as the fire company president. He was elected by town meeting to the fire district board and appointed by the board of selectmen to serve as the deputy emergency management director for the town. In February 2016 he announced that he was seeking the Democratic nomination for an open house seat in the Connecticut General Assembly. He was elected on November 8, 2016, with 55% of the vote, and took office on January 4, 2017. Boyd is a founding member of Unite America.

== Electoral history ==
Connecticut House of Representatives: General Election 2016: 50th District
Party	Candidate	Votes	%
Democratic	Pat Boyd	6,386	55.3
Republican	Nora Valentine	5,165	44.7
Total votes		11,551	100

Connecticut House of Representatives: General Election 2018: 50th District
Party	Candidate	Votes	%
Democratic	Pat Boyd	5,662	57
Republican	AJ Kerouac	4,282	43
Total votes		9,944	100

Connecticut House of Representatives: General Election 2020: 50th District
Party	Candidate	Votes	%
Democratic	Pat Boyd	8,564	100
Total votes		8,564	100

Connecticut House of Representatives: General Election 2022: 50th District
Party	Candidate	Votes	%
Democratic	Pat Boyd	6,043	54
Republican	Aaron Soucy	5,179	46
Total votes		11,222	100

Connecticut House of Representatives: General Election 2024: 50th District
Party	Candidate	Votes	%
Democratic	Pat Boyd	9,136	100
Total votes		9,136	100

== Legislative record ==
Speaker of the House Joe Aresimowicz appointed Boyd to serve on the Veterans' Affairs Committee, Public Safety and Security Committee for the 2017–2019 session. Boyd is considered a member of the Centrist Wing of the House Democratic Caucus and campaigned openly as an Independent Democrat. Early in the 2017 legislative session, Boyd was the only Democrat in the state house and senate to vote with the Republicans against a deal that Governor Dannel Malloy struck with state employee unions to refinance pension costs.
