= Norman Needleman =

American politician

Norm Needleman

Member of the Connecticut State Senate from the 33rd district
- Incumbent
- Assumed office January 9, 2019
- Preceded by: Art Linares
- Constituency: Portland, East Hampton, Colchester, Haddam, East Haddam, Chester, Lyme, Deep River, Essex, Clinton, Westbrook, Old Saybrook (Part)

Personal details
- Born: Brooklyn, New York
- Party: Democratic
- Website: www.normforsenate.com

Norman Needleman, better known as Norm Needleman, is an American politician who is currently serving as the first selectman of Essex, Connecticut. In addition to this, he also currently serves as a Connecticut State Senator from the 33rd district, which includes the town of Essex. Needleman is a member of the Democratic Party.

== Political career ==
=== First Selectman ===
Needleman was elected as First Selectman of the town of Essex in 2011. Needleman has been re-elected selectman in every election afterwards, most recently in 2019.

=== State senator ===
In 2018, Needleman ran for the Connecticut State Senate's 33rd district seat, which encompasses Essex and the surrounding towns. Needleman would later win that election over Republican Melissa Ziobron. In August 2020, in the aftermath of Tropical Storm Isaias and Eversource Energy's widely criticized response to power outages brought on by storm damages, Needleman called upon the CEO of Eversource, James Judge, to resign. In 2020, Needleman was re-elected to a second term as state senator.
