= Connecticut's 34th House of Representatives district =

American legislative district

Connecticut's 34th State House of Representatives district
Representative
Irene Haines; R

Connecticut's 34th House of Representatives district elects one member of the Connecticut House of Representatives. It consists of the towns of East Haddam, East Hampton, and parts of Salem. It has been represented by Republican Irene Haines since 2019.

== List of representatives ==
List of Representatives from Connecticut's 34th State House District
Representative	Party	Years	District home	Note
Robert J. Vicino	Democratic	1967–1973	Bristol	Seat created
William A. O'Neill	Democratic	1973–1979	East Hampton	
Dean P. Markham	Democratic	1979–1993	East Hampton	
Terry Concannon	Democratic	1993–1999	Haddam	
Gail Hamm	Democratic	1999–2013	East Hampton	
Melissa Ziobron	Republican	2013–2019	East Haddam	
Irene Haines	Republican	2019–	East Haddam	

== Recent elections ==
=== 2020 ===
2020 Connecticut State House of Representatives election, District 34
Party	Candidate	Votes	%
Republican	Irene Haines (incumbent)	7,912	55.79
Democratic	Judd Melon	5,816	41.01
Working Families	Judd Melon	228	1.61
Independent Party	Lance Lusignan	227	1.60
Total votes		14,183	100.00
Republican hold			

=== 2018 ===
2018 Connecticut House of Representatives election, District 34
Party	Candidate	Votes	%
Republican	Irene Haines	5,936	52.0
Democratic	Theresa Govert	5,478	48.0
Total votes		11,414	100.00
Republican hold			

=== 2016 ===
2016 Connecticut House of Representatives election, District 34
Party	Candidate	Votes	%
Republican	Melissa Ziobron (Incumbent)	10,449	100.00
Republican hold			

=== 2014 ===
2014 Connecticut House of Representatives election, District 34
Party	Candidate	Votes	%
Republican	Melissa Ziobron (Incumbent)	5,849	63.4
Democratic	Mimi Perotti	2,772	30.00
Independent Party	Melissa Ziobron (Incumbent)	604	6.5
Total votes		9,225	100.00
Republican hold			

=== 2012 ===
2012 Connecticut House of Representatives election, District 34
Party	Candidate	Votes	%
Republican	Melissa Ziobron (Incumbent)	6,241	54.9
Democratic	Christopher Goff	5,122	45.1
Total votes		11,363	100.00
Republican hold			
