= Morag Vance =

American politician

Member of the Connecticut House of Representatives from the 123rd district
- In office 1977–1989
- Preceded by: George B. Baehr Jr.
- Succeeded by: Dale W. Radcliffe

Personal details
- Party: Republican

Morag L. Vance (born 1933 or 1934) is an American politician who served in the Connecticut House of Representatives from 1977 to 1989, representing the 123rd district as a Republican. She lived in Trumbull during her tenure.
