= Connecticut Department of Labor =

Government agency in Connecticut

Department overview
- Jurisdiction: Connecticut
- Headquarters: 200 Folly Brook Blvd. Wethersfield, CT 06109
- Department executive: Danté Bartolomeo, Commissioner of Labor
- Website: https://portal.ct.gov/dol

The Connecticut Department of Labor (CTDOL) is an executive department of the Connecticut state government. It is responsible for the enforcement of state labor laws and promoting "global economic competitiveness through strengthening the state's workforce." The CTDOL works with the federal Department of Labor and often collaborates with the Bureau of Labor Statistics. The department is located in the town of Wethersfield, nearby the state capital of Hartford.

== History ==
The precursor to the CTDOL was the Connecticut Bureau of Labor Statistics, founded in the 1880s at the behest of the Knights of Labor's rising influence in state politics and labor relations. The bureau would later expand and evolve into the modern Connecticut Department of Labor in the succeeding decades.

For the fiscal year of 1994-1995, the Connecticut General Assembly authorized bonding of the CTDOL to make the unemployment insurance trust fund solvent; in return, the department agreed to strengthen its efforts to recover money that had been improperly paid out in unemployment benefits. The CTDOL would go on to develop a more "lean" management style, including annual savings of about $151,000 in staff costs and $13,000 in materials.

In 2022, the CTDOL transitioned to a new unemployment filing system, ReEmployCT, replacing the state's forty year old legacy system with a new "online and mobile friendly" setup. This transition occurred in the wake of the COVID-19 Pandemic, which saw the claims that the department received jump from 40,000 to 400,000 in a one-week period.

In 2024, an audit revealed that the CTDOL had systemically failed to investigate allegations of wage theft and other workplace concerns, with a backlog of around 1,000 cases left unaddressed that year. This issue was widely blamed on the department's historic shortage of staff and financial resources. The controversy also prompted calls for the resignation of Thomas Wydra, the head of the department's Wage & Workplace Standards Division.

In 2025, the CTDOL was one of 14 recipients of an $86 million funding award from the federal Department of Labor, receiving $8 million to support a number of industries from construction to shipbuilding.

== Divisions and units ==
- American Job Centers
- Office of Apprenticeship Training
- Business Engagement Unit
- Benefit Payment Control Unit (BPCU)
- Occupational Safety and Health Division (CONN-OSHA)
- Communications Unit
- State Board of Mediation and Arbitration
- Employment Security Appeals Division
- Human Resources Unit
- Integrity Unit and Fraud Watch
- Legal Division
- Job Seeker Services
- Jobs First Employment Services Unit (JFES)
- Office of Diversity and Equity Programs (ODEP)
- Office of Research
- Rapid Response and Dislocated Worker Unit
- State Board of Labor Relations
- Unemployment Insurance Benefits Division
- Unemployment Insurance Tax Division
- Wage and Workplace Standards Division
- Workplace Innovation and Opportunity Act (WIOA) Administration Unit

Discontinued Divisions/Units:

- Trade Adjustment Act Division
- Unemployed Workers' Advocate Unit (UWA)

== See also ==
- United States Department of Labor
- Labor law
