= Irene Haines =

American politician

Member of the Connecticut House of Representatives from the 34th district
- Incumbent
- Assumed office January 9, 2019
- Preceded by: Melissa Ziobron

Personal details
- Born: 1961 (age 64–65)
- Party: Republican
- Children: 2

Irene Haines (born 1961) is a Republican member of the Connecticut House of Representatives. She represents District 34, which includes Colchester, East Haddam and East Hampton.

== Personal life ==
Haines lives in East Haddam.

== Political positions ==
Haines is a proponent of banning balloon releases.
