= David Rutigliano =

American politician

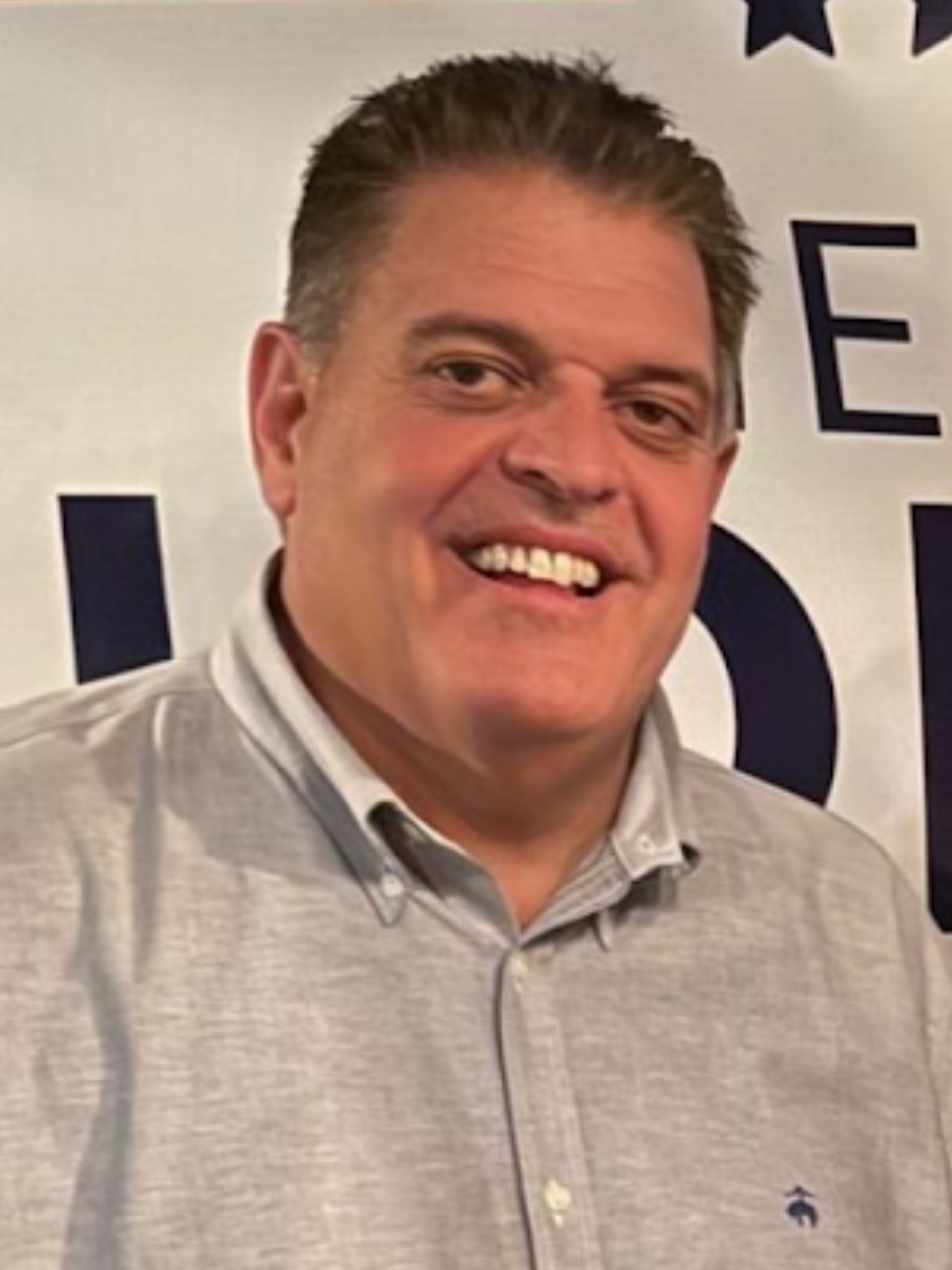
- Rutigliano in 2024

Member of the Connecticut House of Representatives from the 123rd district
- Incumbent
- Assumed office January 9, 2013
- Preceded by: T. R. Rowe

Personal details
- Born: July 14, 1965 (age 61)
- Party: Republican
- Education: Johnson and Wales University (AAS)

David Rutigliano (born July 14, 1965) is an American politician who has served in the Connecticut House of Representatives from the 123rd district since 2013.
