= Morton J. Blumenthal =

American politician (1931–2022)

Member of the Connecticut House of Representatives from the 56th district
- In office 1971–1973
- Preceded by: Francis J. McMerriman
- Succeeded by: Thomas H. Dooley

Member of the Connecticut House of Representatives from the 50th district
- In office 1973–1975
- Preceded by: Audrey P. Beck
- Succeeded by: James A. O'Connor

Personal details
- Born: October 14, 1931 Putnam, Connecticut, U.S.
- Died: January 16, 2022 (aged 90) Marlboro Township, New Jersey, U.S.
- Party: Republican

Morton J. Blumenthal (October 14, 1931 – January 16, 2022) was an American politician.

Blumenthal was born in Putnam, Connecticut, son of Nathan & Dora Blumenthal, and graduated from Killingly High School. He received his bachelor's degree and law degrees from the University of Connecticut. He served in the United States Air Force. Blumenthal was admitted to the Connecticut bar. He served in the Connecticut House of Representatives from 1971 to 1975 and was a Republican. During his first term, he represented the 56th district, and during his second, the 50th. Morton was also chairman of the Town of Killingly Planning and Zoning Commission for a period of time and was involved in affordable housing development in the area with his brother Bernard Blumenthal in the 1970s. He then moved with his family to Manchester, New Hampshire, where he was involved with housing development there as well. He died in Marlboro Township, New Jersey. He was Jewish.
