= Herron Gaston =

American politician

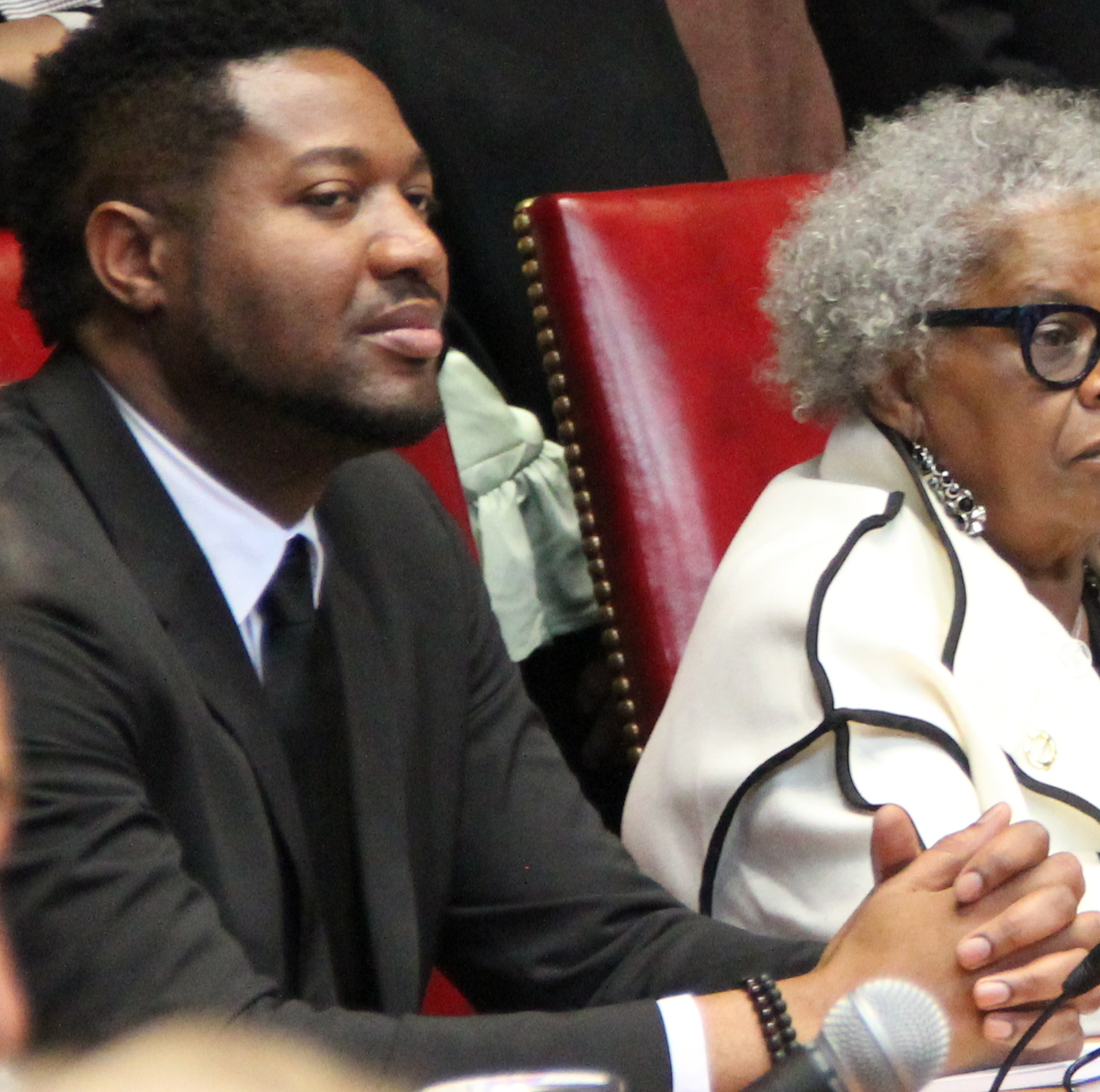
- Gaston in 2023

Member of the Connecticut State Senate from the 23rd district
- Incumbent
- Assumed office January 4, 2023
- Preceded by: Dennis Bradley

Personal details
- Born: Herron Keyon Gaston; June 11, 1994 (age 32) Haines City, Florida , U.S.
- Party: Democratic
- Education: Florida Agricultural and Mechanical University (BA); Florida Agricultural and Mechanical University (MPA); Quinnipiac University (JD); Yale University (M.Div); Yale University (STM); Andover Newton Seminary at Yale (D.Min)
- Occupation: Professor, Pastor, and Public Administrator
- Website: Official website

Herron Keyon Gaston (born June 11, 1994) is an American businessman, pastor, academic, author who has self-published four books, and politician who currently serves as a member of the Connecticut State Senate, where he serves as the Deputy President Pro Tempore, for the Democratic Party representing the 23rd district encompassing parts of Bridgeport and Stratford. Sen. Gaston is also a close cousin of Derwin James Jr. of the Los Angeles Chargers.

== Professional career ==
Gaston was raised in a religious and service-oriented background that later informed his work as a pastor and public servant. Early in his career, he interned for and was mentored by the late U.S. Representative John Lewis. Gaston was also mentored by The Rev. Jesse Jackson.

Gaston has held several senior academic and administrative positions. He serves as Vice President and Chief of Staff at the University of Bridgeport, where he is also a Professor of Criminal Justice & Society and a Professor of Sociology. He is the first African American to hold this academic post in the university’s history. Previously, he served as Director of Admissions and Recruitment at Yale Divinity School, becoming the first African American to hold that role since the school’s founding.

In addition to his academic work, Gaston serves as Assistant Chief Administrative Officer and Commissioner of the Civil Service Commission for the City of Bridgeport. He also serves as the Protestant Chaplain for the Bridgeport Police Department.

== Political career ==
Gaston was first elected to the Senate in 2022. He won in a three-way field that included Republican candidate Michael Garrett and Working Families Party candidate Juliemar Ortiz. The race followed his successful challenge in the Democratic primary to the incumbent, Dennis Bradley, a contest that was ultimately decided by Bradley’s loss of party support after he was charged with federal campaign finance violations.

He currently chairs the Public Safety Committee and vice-chairs the Housing Committee. Sen. Gaston also serves on the environment, judiciary, and transportation committees. He is currently the Deputy President Pro Tempore. Sen. Gaston was invited to the White House by President Biden and Vice-President Harris to address gun violence prevention as a result of his progressive policies around public safety. Sen. Gaston was named one of the 100 most influential Blacks in Connecticut and one of the most successful Blacks in America by the NAACP.
