= Dennis Bradley =

American attorney and politician

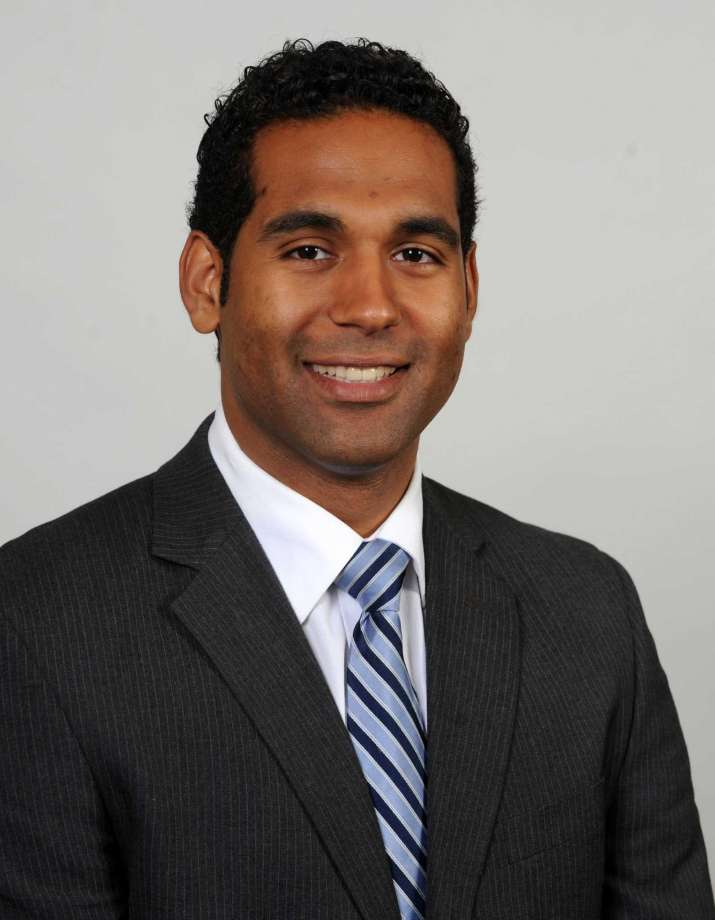

Member of the Connecticut State Senate from the 23rd district
- In office January 9, 2019 – January 4, 2023
- Preceded by: Ed Gomes
- Succeeded by: Herron Gaston

Personal details
- Born: 1983 (age 42–43)
- Party: Democratic
- Education: Norwich University (BA); University of Massachusetts School of Law (JD)

Dennis Bradley (born. c. 1983) is a former American attorney and politician who served in the Connecticut State Senate, representing District 23 from January 9, 2019, to January 4, 2023.

== Background and education ==
Bradley is of Dominican heritage. Bradley received his Juris Doctor from the University of Massachusetts School of Law, and prior to that received his bachelor's degree in political science and government from Norwich University.

== Professional career ==
Bradley previously served as Principal Partner at the law firm Bradley, Denkovich and Karayiannis, P.C. Bradley also served as a campaign associate for the congressional campaign of Jim Himes.

On November 6, 2018, Bradley ran against Republican John Rodriguez for the office of Senator for Connecticut's 23rd State Senate District.

Bradley won the election with 86.5% of the vote, with a total of 12,636 ballots cast in his favor.

On May 10, 2022, he lost the Democratic Party's endorsement to Reverend Herron Gaston, his main primary challenger, though he maintained enough support to force a primary in August. Bradley lost the August 8, 2022 primary to Rev. Gaston by 4 points.

== Legal issues and controversies ==
In May 2021, Bradley was arrested on federal charges. He was indicted with one count of conspiracy to commit wire fraud and 5 counts of wire fraud.

In 2026, Bradley was convicted of fraud relating to his 2022 re-election bid.

In August 2026, a Bridgeport woman accused Bradley of election misconduct related to his brother Mark Bradley's candidacy in a probate judge race. The woman said Dennis Bradley and another man arrived at her home, opened an absentee ballot envelope, and walked her through how to change her vote from the incumbent Paul Ganim (brother of Mayor Joe Ganim) to Mark Bradley. The woman called police after they left and the envelope was taken into evidence.
