= Connecticut's 50th House of Representatives district =

American legislative district

Connecticut's 50th State House of Representatives district
Representative
Pat Boyd; D

Connecticut's 50th House of Representatives district elects one member of the Connecticut House of Representatives. It consists of the towns of Ashford, Brooklyn, Woodstock, Eastford, Hampton, Pomfret and Mansfield. It has been represented by Democrat Pat Boyd since 2017.

== List of representatives ==
List of Representatives from Connecticut's 50th State House District
Representative	Party	Years	District home	Note
Foster H. Richards	Republican	1967–1969	Mansfield	Seat created
Audrey P. Beck	Democratic	1969–1973	Storrs	
Morton J. Blumenthal	Republican	1973–1975	Killingly	Did not run for reelection
James A. O'Connor	Democratic	1975–1977	Killingly	Did not run for reelection
James A. Weiss	Republican	1977–1981	Pomfret	Did not run for reelection
John T. Savage	Republican	1981–1991	Eastford	Defeated
Jefferson B. Davis	Democratic	1991–2004	Pomfret	Resigned
Reece Painter	Democratic	2004–2005	Woodstock	Defeated
Mike Alberts	Republican	2005–2017	Woodstock	Did not run for reelection
Pat Boyd	Democratic	2017–present	Pomfret	Incumbent

== Recent elections ==
=== 2020 ===
2020 Connecticut State House of Representatives election, District 50
Party	Candidate	Votes	%
Democratic	Pat Boyd (incumbent)	8,564	100.00
Democratic hold			

=== 2018 ===
2018 Connecticut House of Representatives election, District 50
Party	Candidate	Votes	%
Democratic	Pat Boyd (Incumbent)	5,662	56.9
Republican	AJ Kerouac	4,282	43.1
Total votes		9,944	100.00
Democratic hold			

=== 2016 ===
2016 Connecticut House of Representatives election, District 50
Party	Candidate	Votes	%
Democratic	Pat Boyd	6,243	54.72
Republican	Nora Valentine	5,165	45.28
Total votes		11,408	100.00
Democratic gain from Republican			

=== 2014 ===
2014 Connecticut House of Representatives election, District 50
Party	Candidate	Votes	%
Republican	Mike Alberts (Incumbent)	5,909	100.00
Republican hold			

=== 2012 ===
2012 Connecticut House of Representatives election, District 50
Party	Candidate	Votes	%
Republican	Mike Alberts (Incumbent)	7,653	100.00
Republican hold			
