= Connecticut's 23rd State Senate district =

American legislative district

Senator
| Herron Gaston; D |

Connecticut's 23rd State Senate district elects one member of the Connecticut State Senate. It encompasses parts of Bridgeport and Stratford. It has been represented by Democrat Herron Gaston since 2023.

== Recent elections ==
=== 2020 ===
2020 Connecticut State Senate election, District 23
| Party | Candidate | Votes | % |
|---|---|---|---|
| Democratic | Dennis Bradley (incumbent) | 20,317 | 83.53 |
| Republican | Josiah Israel | 4,006 | 16.47 |
| Total votes | | 24,323 | 100.00 |
| Democratic hold | | | |

=== 2018 ===
2018 Connecticut State Senate election, District 23
| Party | Candidate | Votes | % |
|---|---|---|---|
| Democratic | Dennis Bradley (incumbent) | 14,456 | 86.8 |
| Republican | John Rodriguez | 2,199 | 13.2 |
| Total votes | | 16,655 | 100.0 |
| Democratic hold | | | |

=== 2016 ===
2016 Connecticut State Senate election, District 23
| Party | Candidate | Votes | % |
|---|---|---|---|
| Democratic | Edwin Gomes (incumbent) | 19,689 | 88.4 |
| Republican | Mike Garrett | 2,583 | 11.6 |
| Total votes | | 22,272 | 100.0 |
| Democratic hold | | | |

=== 2014 ===
2014 Connecticut State Senate election, District 23
| Party | Candidate | Votes | % |
|---|---|---|---|
| Democratic | Andres Ayala Jr. (incumbent) | 10,283 | 100.0 |
| Total votes | | 10,283 | 100.0 |
| Democratic hold | | | |

=== 2012 ===
2018 Connecticut State Senate election, District 23
| Party | Candidate | Votes | % |
|---|---|---|---|
| Democratic | Andres Ayala Jr. | 19,842 | 91.6 |
| Republican | Caz Mizera | 1,815 | 8.4 |
| Total votes | | 21,657 | 100.0 |
| Democratic hold | | | |
