= Donald E. Williams Jr. =

American politician (born 1957)

Donald Williams
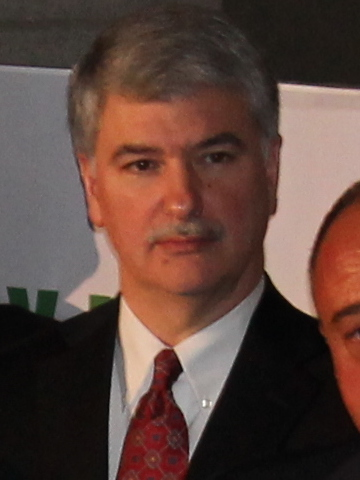

President pro tempore of the Connecticut State Senate
- In office July 1, 2004 – January 7, 2015
- Preceded by: Kevin Sullivan
- Succeeded by: Martin Looney

Member of the Connecticut State Senate from the 29th district
- In office January 6, 1993 – January 7, 2015
- Preceded by: Kevin Johnston
- Succeeded by: Mae Flexer

Personal details
- Born: July 1, 1957 (age 69) Cincinnati, Ohio, U.S.
- Party: Democratic
- Spouse: Laura Williams
- Children: Nina Williams
- Education: Syracuse University; Washington and Lee University

Donald E. Williams Jr. (born July 1, 1957) is an American politician from Connecticut. Williams was first elected to the Connecticut General Assembly in a special election in 1993. Prior to his service in the State Senate, he served two terms as the First Selectman for the town of Thompson. In July 2004, Senator Williams was elected to serve as the President Pro Tempore, the highest-ranking legislator in the Connecticut General Assembly. He was reelected to this post five times, in 2005, 2007, 2009, 2011, and 2013.

He served as the Chair of the Legislative Management Committee and Vice-Chair of the Executive and Legislative Nominations Committee. He was Co-Chair of the Barack Obama for President Connecticut Leadership Council. He serves as Regent on the Connecticut Board of Regents for Higher Education.

== Legislative accomplishments ==
Senator Williams has spearheaded a variety of initiatives in the areas of campaign finance reform, ethics reform, protection of children and environmental protection and preservation.

As chairman of the Environment Committee he led the charge to clean up power plants (referred to as the "Sooty Six") that pollute Connecticut's air. He also initiated efforts to preserve the state's natural water resources, fishing and shellfish industry in Long Island Sound. He has also been recognized for his efforts to help protect Connecticut farmers.

He has also served as chairman of the Judiciary Committee, where he authored legislation creating both the Office of the Child Advocate and the Office of the Victim Advocate in addition to his many efforts to prevent domestic violence.

Shortly after his election in 1993, he authored legislation creating the first enterprise corridor zones in rural areas to help attract and retain jobs in northeastern Connecticut. This program allowed rural towns in need of economic development to utilize the same economic development benefits that had been provided in the past to certain urban centers.

Moreover, he has composed legislation to reform the State Ethics Commission and helped implement sweeping reforms to the campaign finance system and state contracting process.

Some of Williams' proposals were controversial and were not adopted. In 2006, he was criticized after proposing to regulate speech in political ads, which was considered an attack on the First Amendment.

In 2005, he was able to provide millions of dollars to preserve farmland and open space, protect historic sites, and increase the supply of affordable housing in northeastern Connecticut. In 2006, he was at the forefront of legislation that banned the sale of soda and other unhealthy beverages in schools. That very same bill tripled the funding for schools to provide healthier alternatives for students.

On the school nutrition bill, he was aligned with Meriden Democrat Thomas Gaffey, who also favored banning soda and snack food from Connecticut public schools. Many parents have derided this bill as the "cupcake bill" and consider it an affront to parental responsibility, as local schools have told children not to bring in sweets for birthday parties. In March 2008 New Haven schools enforced this law by suspending an eighth grader for selling a classmate Skittles. In May 2008 a principal in Greenwich was suspended in a dispute over bringing cupcakes to school.

Williams is a strong supporter of higher education, including the UCONN 2000 and UCONN 21st Century initiatives that dramatically improved the buildings and campus of the University of Connecticut. In addition, he supported the CSU 2020 program that will provide the same support for the state university system. In approving the legislation, Governor M. Jodi Rell said, "If there is a crown jewel in this bonding bill, it is the program that will continue the glorious transformation of higher education in Connecticut. That transformation began with ‘UConn 2000’ and continues today with ‘CSU 2020.’"

The CSU bonding proposal was not without controversy, however. Governor Rell vetoed a bonding package that included $1 billion for the Connecticut state university system. Democrats failed to override the veto because Senator Joan Hartley, chairman of the higher education committee, believed the CSU bonding lacked accountability. Williams then threatened Hartley with political retaliation. After a revised bonding package passed, it was revealed that Williams' ally Thomas Gaffey had an undisclosed intimate relationship with the lobbyist for the CSU system. Williams then flatly denied an investigation into Gaffey's conduct was warranted. Gaffey pleaded guilty to campaign finance violations in January 2011 and resigned his seat.

== Professional career ==
Senator Williams was the News and Public Affairs Director for WINY radio in Putnam, Connecticut, from 1980 to 1983. He practiced law at the firm of Boland, Saint Onge and Brouillard. He was also the Law Review Research Editor at the Washington and Lee University School of Law.

He served on the Board of Directors of HealthNet, Inc., the Northeast Connecticut Chamber of Commerce, the Quinebaug Valley Youth and Family Services, as the Chair of the Northeast Economic Alliance, and as Chair of the Northeastern Connecticut Council of Governments.
