= Gail Hamm =

American politician (1951–2013)

Member of the Connecticut House of Representatives from the 34th district
- In office January 6, 1999 – January 9, 2013
- Preceded by: Terry Concannon
- Succeeded by: Melissa Ziobron

Personal details
- Born: August 19, 1951 Hillsdale, Michigan, U.S.
- Died: October 24, 2013 (aged 62) East Hampton, Connecticut, U.S.
- Party: Democratic

Gail Hamm (August 19, 1951 – October 24, 2013) was an American politician who served in the Connecticut House of Representatives from the 34th district from 1999 to 2013.

Hamm died of breast cancer on October 24, 2013, in East Hampton, Connecticut at age 62.
