= Mike Alberts =

Connecticut politician

Member of the Connecticut House of Representatives from the 50th district
- In office 2005–2017
- Preceded by: Reece Painter
- Succeeded by: Pat Boyd

Personal details
- Party: Republican
- Education: University of Connecticut

Mike Alberts is an American Republican Party politician who served as a member of the Connecticut House of Representatives from the 50th district, which consists of the towns of Brooklyn, Woodstock, Eastford, Pomfret and Union, from 2005 to 2017. Near the end of his term, Alberts served on the House's Banks Committee, Commerce Committee, and Higher Education and Employment Advancement Committee. After his retirement from the House, He was succeeded in the seat by Democrat Pat Boyd. Alberts is a graduate of the University of Connecticut and was selected as President and CEO of the regional Jewett City Savings Bank in 2021.
