= Jan Hochadel =

American politician

Member of the Connecticut State Senate from the 13th district
- Incumbent
- Assumed office January 4, 2023
- Preceded by: Mary Daugherty Abrams

Personal details
- Born: Janis Bibby; January 21, 1964 (age 62) North Attleborough, Massachusetts, U.S.
- Party: Democratic
- Children: 3
- Education: North Attleborough High School
- Alma mater: University of New Haven (BS); Sacred Heart University (M.Ed.)
- Occupation: Engineer, educator and politician
- Website: janhochadel.com

Janis Hochadel known as Jan Hochadel (/hɒkɑːdəl/; née Bibby; born January 21, 1964) is an American engineer, educator and politician. She currently serves as a member of the Connecticut State Senate representing the 13th district, which encompasses Meriden, Middlefield and parts of Cheshire and Middletown. She assumed office on January 4, 2023. She won election following the resignation of Mary Daugherty Abrams at the end of 2022. She is the former president and incumbent vice president of the American Federation of Teachers Connecticut (AFT).

== Early life and education ==
Hochadel was born Janis Bibby on January 21, 1964, in North Attleborough, Massachusetts to Richard and Judith (née Freeman) Bibby. Her father was a highway maintenance engineer for the Massachusetts Department of Transportation, while his wife was a homemaker. She had one elder sister, Cheryl Lynn Reinbold (1962-2023) and a brother Mark Bibby. She graduated from North Attleborough High School and then completed a Bachelor of Science in Mechanical engineering at the University of New Haven. She also holds a Masters of Education from Sacred Heart University in Fairfield.

== Career ==
She started her career after graduation at Omega Engineering in Stamford, Connecticut and Pfizer in Wallingford and New York City. After her career in engineering she opted to teach physics and science at technical high schools in Connecticut. In 2015, she became the president of the Connecticut chapter of the American Federation of Teachers.

== Politics ==
Hochadel was elected into Connecticut State Senate in the 2022 Connecticut primary election on November 8, 2022, defeating Republican candidate Joseph Vollano. She assumed office on January 4, 2022. She currently is a deputy majority leader and Chair of the Aging commission as well as vice chair of the Environment commission. Hochadel is also a member of the Banking, Commerce, Housing as well as Planning & Development commissions.

== Personal life ==
Hochadel is divorced and has three children. She resides in Meriden, Connecticut.
