= Geraldine Elliot =

American politician

Member of the Connecticut House of Representatives from the 44th district
- In office 1985–1987
- Preceded by: Richard A. Gosselin
- Succeeded by: Richard A. Gosselin

Personal details
- Born: 1935 or 1936
- Party: Republican
- Education: Quinebaug Valley Community College

Geraldine Champagne Elliot (born 1935 or 1936) is an American politician who served in the Connecticut House of Representatives from 1985 to 1987, representing the 44th district as a Republican. During her tenure, she lived in Danielson, a borough of Killingly, and later in Moosup, a village in Plainfield.
