= Nina Williams (climber) =

American professional rock climber (born 1990)

Personal information
- Born: August 21, 1990 (age 35) Killingly, Connecticut, U.S.
- Occupation: Professional rock climber
- Height: 5 ft 3 in (160 cm)
- Weight: 120 lb (54 kg)
- Website: nina-williams.com

Climbing career
- Type of climber: Bouldering
- Highest grade: Bouldering: V13 (8B)
- Updated on May 12, 2023

Nina Williams (born August 21, 1990) is an American professional rock climber based in Boulder, Colorado, best known for her highball bouldering.

== Early life ==
Williams was born in Killingly, Connecticut and grew up in Pawtucket, Rhode Island. She started climbing in New Hampshire in 2002, after trying ballet, soccer and horseback riding.

In 2017, Williams wrote a personal essay for Rock & Ice magazine about being exposed as a cheater as a young teenager, after falsifying her results in a USA Climbing regional qualifier competition. As a result of her actions, she was banned from competition for the season. In a 2016 interview with Chris Weidner, Williams said that the intense pressure she put on herself to win and a lack of confidence led her to cheat. Returning to competition climbing required Williams to reshape her mental approach, writing that rather than seeking external approval, she would "climb because I love it".

== Climbing career ==
=== Bouldering ===
In 2015, she completed her first V13 (8B) in Rocklands, South Africa by completing the first female ascent of Ray of Light.

Williams is noted for her Highball bouldering, in which the climber attempts a very tall boulder problem without rope protection, combining the physicality of bouldering with the mental discipline of free soloing. In 2017, Williams completed the first female ascent of Ambrosia in the Buttermilks, and Climbing magazine called it, "one of the hardest free solos ever done by a woman". Williams has also completed two other difficult routes on the same boulder, Evilution Direct (V11) and Footprints (V9) to complete the "Grandpa Peabody Trifecta", the first woman ever to do so.

In February 2018, she made the fourth ascent, and first female ascent, of Window Shopper V12 (8A+), in Boulder, Colorado. In March 2019, she made the seventh ascent, and first female ascent, of Too Big to Flail V10 (7C+) a 50 ft highball in the Buttermilks.

Williams was featured in the short film, The High Road (2019), which was selected for the Banff Mountain Film Festival, and shown during the REELROCK 14 film tour. The film focused on Williams' method of practicing on a rope in preparation for her highball bouldering, culminating with her ascent of Too Big to Flail V10 (7C+), a 50 ft (15 m) highball in the Buttermilks.

=== Rock climbing ===
In 2016, she sent Final Frontier, a 5.13b multi-pitch trad route in Yosemite, along with Father Time (5.13b) in 2018.

== Notable ascents ==
- 2015, Speed of Life V10, Farley, Massachusetts
- 2015, Footprints V9, Bishop, California
- 2015, Ray of Light V13, Rocklands, South Africa—First female ascent
- 2016, Final Frontier 5.13b, Yosemite, California
- 2016, Evilution Direct V11, Bishop, California—First female ascent
- 2017, Ambrosia V11, Bishop, California—First female ascent, first woman to complete the Grandpa Peabody trifecta
- 2018, Father Time 5.13b, Yosemite, California
- 2018, Window Shopper V12, Boulder, Colorado—First female ascent
- 2019, Too Big To Flail V10, Bishop, California—Seventh ascent, first female ascent
- 2023, China Beach 5.14b, Rumney, New Hampshire—First female ascent

== Filmography ==
- ZA (2015)
- Reel Rock S2 E4: High and Mighty (2016)
- Reel Rock S6 E1: The High Road (2020)
- Pretty Strong (2020)
- Light (2021)
- Dear Mother: A Climber's Transracial Adoption Story (2024)
