= Mae Flexer =

American politician

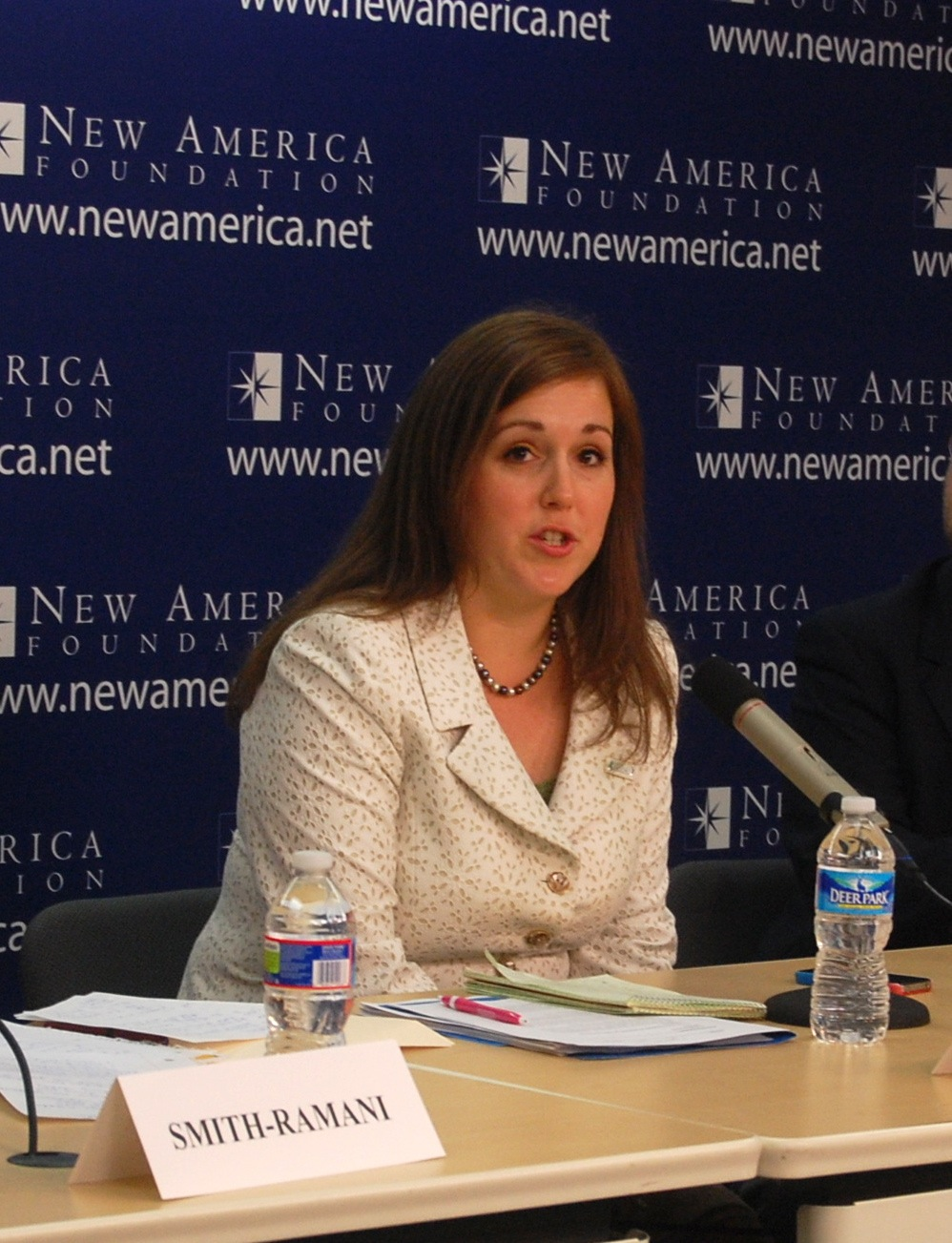

Member of the Connecticut State Senate from the 29th district
- Incumbent
- Assumed office January 7, 2015
- Preceded by: Donald E. Williams Jr.

Member of the Connecticut House of Representatives from the 44th district
- In office January 7, 2009 – January 7, 2015
- Preceded by: Michael Caron
- Succeeded by: Christine Rosati Randall

Personal details
- Party: Democratic
- Education: University of Connecticut (BA)
- Website: Senate website

Mae Flexer is a member of the Connecticut State Senate representing the state's 29th district, which includes the towns of Brooklyn, Canterbury, Killingly, Mansfield, Putnam, Scotland, Thompson, and Windham. A Democrat, Flexer previously served three terms in the Connecticut House of Representatives representing the state's 44th assembly district.

== Early life and education ==
Flexer is a native of Killingly, Connecticut, where she graduated from Killingly High School. She earned an Associate's degree from Quinebaug Valley Community College and a Bachelor of Arts degree in Political Science from the University of Connecticut.

== Career ==
Flexer joined her Democratic Town Committee when she was 18. At 23, she was one of the youngest persons in the state ever elected Town Committee Chairwoman.

Flexer worked as a legislative aide for Connecticut Senate President Donald E. Williams Jr for three years.

Flexer was elected a state representative in 2008, defeating Republican Angeline Kwasny by 3,136 votes. She has never won a majority of votes in her hometown of Killingly through six election cycles for 29th District Senate.
