= Elaine Hammers =

American politician

Member of the Connecticut House of Representatives from the 123rd district
- In office 1997–1999
- Preceded by: Dale W. Radcliffe
- Succeeded by: T.R. Rowe

Personal details
- Party: Republican
- Spouse: Lynwood Hammers
- Children: 2
- Education: Marymount Manhattan College

Elaine Hammers is an American politician who served in the Connecticut House of Representatives from 1997 to 1999, representing the 123rd district as a Republican. In 2016, Hammers unsuccessfully ran for the 22nd district of the Connecticut State Senate. She was defeated by Democratic candidate Marilyn Moore.
