= Margaret Hurley (Connecticut politician) =

American politician (1878–1975)

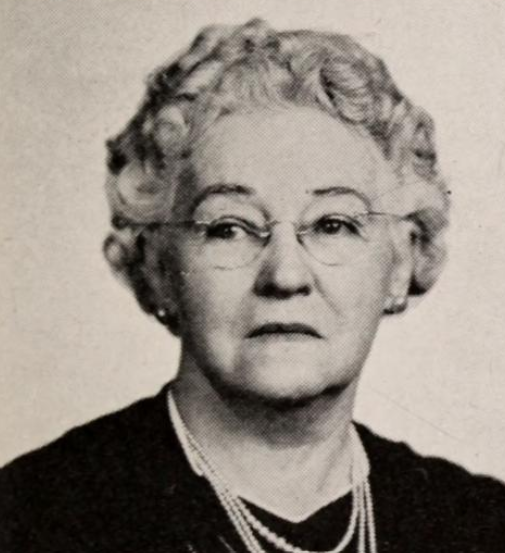

Member of the Connecticut House of Representatives from Windham
- In office 1935–1943
- Preceded by: Arthur T. Kelley; Joseph A. Lefebvre
- Succeeded by: John R. Pickett; Amie J. Boucher

Member of the Connecticut Senate from the 29th district
- In office 1943–1947
- Preceded by: Pierre J. Laramee
- Succeeded by: Lionel E. Raymond

Personal details
- Born: 1878 Willimantic, Connecticut, U.S.
- Died: November 10, 1975 (aged 97) St. Petersburg, Florida, U.S.
- Party: Democratic
- Spouse: James H. Hurley
- Education: Willimantic Normal School

Margaret Courtney Hurley (1878 – November 10, 1975) was an American politician from Connecticut. A Democrat, she served in the Connecticut House of Representatives from 1935 to 1943 as a representative from the town of Windham. From 1943 to 1947, she served in the Connecticut State Senate, representing the 29th district.

== Personal life ==
Hurley was born in Willimantic, Connecticut, in 1878. She graduated from the Academy of the Holy Family in Baltic and Eastern Connecticut State University, then known as the Willimantic Normal School. She was married to James H. Hurley, who was mayor of Willimantic from 1931 to 1935.

Hurley died on November 10, 1975, in St. Petersburg, Florida. She was 97.

== Career ==
Hurley was elected to the Connecticut House of Representatives in 1934, and she served four terms as one of two representatives from the town of Windham, Connecticut. She did not run for reelection in 1942, instead running for the 29th district of the Connecticut State Senate. Hurley was elected and served two terms. She did not run for reelection in 1946 and was succeeded by Republican candidate Lionel E. Raymond.
