= Danté Bartolomeo =

American politician (born 1969)

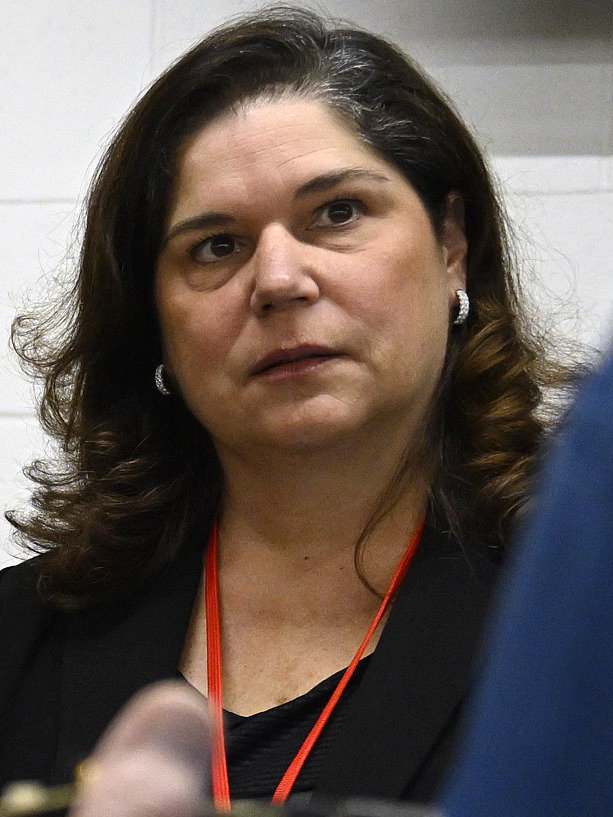

Commissioner of the Connecticut Department of Labor
- Incumbent
- Assumed office 1 July 2021
- Governor: Ned Lamont
- Preceded by: Kurt Westby

Member of the Connecticut Senate from the 13th district
- In office 5 January 2013 – 3 January 2017
- Preceded by: Len Suzio
- Succeeded by: Len Suzio

Member of the Meriden City Council
- In office July 2008 – December 2012
- Preceded by: Michael Rohde
- Succeeded by: Larue A. Graham
- Constituency: Area 2

Personal details
- Born: Danté Jean Craig Self; 1969 (age 56–57) Meriden, Connecticut, U.S.
- Party: Democratic
- Spouse: Doug
- Children: 2
- Education: Colby College (BA)

Danté Jean Craig Bartolomeo (born 1969) is an American politician. A Democrat, Bartolomeo was a member of the Connecticut Senate from 2013 to 2017, representing the 13th district. Prior to this, she was a member of the Meriden City Council from 2008 to 2012.

After leaving office, she was appointed to serve as deputy commissioner of the Connecticut Department of Labor in 2019. She was promoted to the position of commissioner in July 2021, and was formally confirmed in February 2022.

== Early life and education ==
Bartolomeo was born on 1969. Her father, Craig Self, was a Republican who served as town chairman of Wallingford, Connecticut. Bartolomeo attributed her political positioning as a fiscal moderate to his influence, and her mother, Barbara Calza Self, for her views on social liberalism. Bartolomeo has a sister, Elizabeth Mercedes Craig Self.

Bartolomeo is a 1987 graduate of Mercy High School in Middletown and earned her bachelor of arts degree in psychology from Colby College in 1991 with a cum laude distinction.

== Political career ==
Bartolomeo was a member of the Meriden City Council from July 2008 to December 2012. She succeeded Michael Rohde as representative of Area 2, after Rohde had been elected mayor.

=== State Senate ===
During her first state legislative campaign against incumbent state representative Len Suzio in 2012, Bartolomeo claimed that his supporters were using push polls to gain an advantage.

Suzio's win in a 2011 special election was considered a "fluke", due in part to the fact that Suzio's predecessor Thomas Gaffey had violated electoral law. Bartolomeo defeated Suzio, and took office as a Democratic legislator representing the thirteenth district of the Connecticut Senate. She faced Suzio for a second time in 2014, and won reelection.

Bartolomeo's 2016 campaign was unsuccessful, and Suzio, backed by the Connecticut Business and Industry Association, returned to office.

=== Connecticut Department of Labor ===
In January 2019, Ned Lamont appointed Bartolomeo deputy commissioner of the Connecticut Department of Labor. After Kurt Westby announced his intention to retire, Lamont promoted Bartolomeo in June 2021. The Connecticut Senate confirmed Bartolomeo to the position in February 2022. As commissioner, she was chosen by Lamont alongside other agency heads to work on an initiative to tackle homelessness in Connecticut.

== Personal life ==
She and her husband Doug Bartolomeo, a retired police officer, have two children.
