= Michael Caron =

American politician

Member of the Connecticut House of Representatives from the 44th district
- In office January 9, 1991 – January 7, 2009
- Preceded by: Richard Gosselin
- Succeeded by: Mae Flexer

Personal details
- Born: March 29, 1960 (age 66) Putnam, Connecticut
- Party: Republican

Michael Caron (born March 29, 1960) is an American politician who served in the Connecticut House of Representatives from the 44th district from 1991 to 2009.
