= Connecticut's 123rd House of Representatives district =

American legislative district

Connecticut's 123rd State House of Representatives district
Representative
David Rutigliano; R

Connecticut's 123rd House of Representatives district elects one member of the Connecticut House of Representatives. It encompasses parts of Trumbull and has been represented by Republican David Rutigliano since 2013.

== List of representatives ==
List of representatives from Connecticut's 123rd State House district
Representative	Party	Years	District home	Note
Myrtle Perri Gutmann	Democratic	1967–1969	Shelton	Seat created
James S. Connery	Republican	1969–1973	Shelton	
Earl T. Holdsworth	Republican	1973–1975	Trumbull	
George B. Baehr Jr.	Democratic	1975–1977	Trumbull	
Morag Vance	Republican	1977–1989	Trumbull	
Dale W. Radcliffe	Republican	1989–1997	Trumbull	
Elaine Hammers	Republican	1997–1999	Trumbull	
T.R. Rowe	Republican	1999–2013	Trumbull	
David Rutigliano	Republican	2013–	Trumbull	

== Recent elections ==
=== 2020 ===
2020 Connecticut State House of Representatives election, District 123
Party	Candidate	Votes	%
Republican	David Rutigliano (incumbent)	6,816	48.65
Democratic	Sujata Gadkar-Wilcox	6,605	47.14
Independent Party	David Rutigliano (incumbent)	307	2.19
Working Families	Sujata Gadkar-Wilcox	283	2.02
Total votes		14,011	100.00
Republican hold			

=== 2018 ===
2018 Connecticut House of Representatives election, District 123
Party	Candidate	Votes	%
Republican	David Rutigliano (Incumbent)	5,913	53.9
Democratic	Sujata Gadkar-Wilcox	5,062	46.1
Total votes		10,977	100.00
Republican hold			

=== 2016 ===
2016 Connecticut House of Representatives election, District 123
Party	Candidate	Votes	%
Republican	David Rutigliano (Incumbent)	7,727	61.45
Democratic	Lino Constantini	4,874	38.55
Total votes		12,574	100.00
Republican hold			

=== 2014 ===
2014 Connecticut House of Representatives election, District 123
Party	Candidate	Votes	%
Republican	David Rutigliano (Incumbent)	5,055	59.6
Democratic	Lino Constantini	3,016	35.6
Independent Party	David Rutigliano (Incumbent)	220	2.6
Working Families	Douglas Sutherland	187	2.2
Total votes		12,574	100.00
Republican hold			

=== 2012 ===
2012 Connecticut House of Representatives election, District 123
Party	Candidate	Votes	%
Republican	David Rutigliano (Incumbent)	6,273	54.6
Democratic	Lino Constantini	5,132	44.6
Petitioning	Louis A. Bevilacqua Jr.	90	0.8
Total votes		11,495	100.00
Republican hold			
