= Connecticut's 33rd State Senate district =

American legislative district

Senator
Norman Needleman; D

Connecticut's 33rd State Senate district elects one member of the Connecticut State Senate. It consists of the towns of Chester, Clinton, Colchester, Deep River, East Haddam, East Hampton, Essex, Haddam, Lyme, Old Saybrook (part), Portland, Westbrook. It is currently represented by Democrat Norman Needleman.

== Recent elections ==
=== 2024 ===
2024 Connecticut State Senate election, District 33
Party	Candidate	Votes	%
Democratic	Norman Needleman (Incumbent)	33,138	54.10
Independent	Norman Needleman (Incumbent)	1,687	2.75
Republican	Jeff Duigou	22,212	43.14
Total votes		57,037	100.00
Democratic hold			

=== 2022 ===
2022 Connecticut's 33rd State Senate district election
- Precinct results Needleman 50-60% 60-70% Goff 50-60%

2022 Connecticut State Senate election, District 33
Party	Candidate	Votes	%
Democratic	Norman Needleman (Incumbent)	25,898	52.82
Independent	Norman Needleman (Incumbent)	918	1.87
Republican	Brandon Goff	22,212	45.30
Total votes		49,028	100.00
Democratic hold			

=== 2020 ===
2020 Connecticut's 33rd State Senate district election
- Precinct results Needleman 50-60% 60-70% Saunders 50-60%

2020 Connecticut State Senate election, District 33
Party	Candidate	Votes	%
Democratic	Norman Needleman (Incumbent)	33,351	54.00
Republican	Brendan Saunders	28,432	46.00
Total votes		61,783	100.00
Democratic hold			

=== 2018 ===
2018 Connecticut's 33rd State Senate district election
- Precinct results Needleman 50-60% 60-70% Ziobron 50-60%

2018 Connecticut State Senate election, District 33
Party	Candidate	Votes	%
Democratic	Norman Needleman	25,280	50.1
Total	Melissa Ziobron	25,195	49.9
Republican	Melissa Ziobron	23,906	47.4
Independent	Melissa Ziobron	1,289	2.6
Total votes		50,475	100.0
Democratic gain from Republican			

=== 2016 ===
2016 Connecticut's 33rd State Senate district election
- Precinct results Linares 50-60% 60-70% Needleman 40-50% 50-60%

2016 Connecticut State Senate election, District 33
Party	Candidate	Votes	%
Republican	Art Linares (incumbent)	31,594	56.92
Democratic	Norm Needleman	22,954	41.36
Green	Colin Bennett	954	1.72
Total votes		55,502	100.0
Republican hold			

=== 2014 ===
2014 Connecticut State Senate election, District 33
Party	Candidate	Votes	%
Republican	Art Linares (incumbent)	21,173	52.2
Democratic	Emily Bjornberg	16,161	39.9
Independent Party	Art Linares (incumbent)	1,499	3.7
Green	Colin Bennett	527	1.30
Working Families	Emily Bjornberg	1,165	2.9
Total votes		40,525	100.0
Republican hold			

=== 2012 ===
2012 Connecticut State Senate election, District 33
Party	Candidate	Votes	%
Republican	Art Linares	23,915	48.3
Democratic	James Crawford	21,251	42.9
Independent	Melissa Schlag	4,317	8.7
Total votes		55,502	100.0
Republican hold			
