= 2010 Connecticut elections =

Elections for state and federal offices for the 2010 election cycle in Connecticut, US, were held on Tuesday, November 2, 2010. Any necessary primary elections for the Republican and Democratic parties were held on Tuesday, August 10, 2010.

Five of the six statewide positions, as well as the state's Class III U.S. Senate seat, were filled by new individuals by these elections, as their respective incumbents either had chosen to retire or seek other offices.

== Federal offices ==
=== U.S. Senate ===
Five-term incumbent Senator Christopher J. Dodd announced in January 2010 that he would not seek re-election, thus creating an open seat for the November 2010 election. Incumbent Democratic state Attorney General Richard Blumenthal easily secured his party's nomination for the Senate in May, while the Republican candidate was officially decided by primary vote of the state's Republican electorate. State party-endorsed candidate Linda McMahon defeated challengers Peter Schiff and Rob Simmons in the August 10 contest.

In the election, Blumenthal defeated McMahon 636,040 votes (55.16%) to 498,341 (43.22%).

=== U.S. House ===
- District 1: Incumbent Democrat John B. Larson faced Republican challenger Ann Brickley in the election. Brickley defeated Mark Zydanowicz to win the Republican nomination on August 10. Larson faced no Democratic primary challenge. Larson was re-elected in the election, winning 61.25% to 37.20%.
- District 2: Incumbent Democrat Joe Courtney faced Republican challenger Janet Peckinpaugh in the election. Peckinpaugh defeated Daria I. Novak and Doug Dubitsky to win the Republican nomination on August 10. Courtney faced no Democratic primary challenge. Courtney was re-elected in the election, winning 59.86% to 38.76%.
- District 3: Incumbent Democrat Rosa L. DeLauro faced Republican challenger Jerry Labriola Jr. in the election. Neither faced a primary from their own party. DeLauro was re-elected in the election, winning 65.06% to 33.58%.
- District 4: Incumbent Democrat Jim Himes faced Republican challenger Dan Debicella in the election. Debicella defeated Rob Merkle and Rick Torres to win the Republican nomination on August 10. Himes faced no Democratic primary challenge. Himes was re-elected in the election, winning 53.06% to 46.93%.
- District 5: Incumbent Democrat Chris Murphy faced Republican challenger Sam Caligiuri in the election. Caligiuri defeated Justin Bernier and Mark Greenberg to win the Republican nomination on August 10. Murphy faced no Democratic primary challenge. Murphy was re-elected in the election, winning 54.06% to 45.93%.

== State offices ==
=== Statewide ===
==== Governor and Lieutenant Governor ====
Incumbent Republican Governor M. Jodi Rell announced in November 2009 that she would not seek another term in office, creating an open seat for the 2010 election. Primaries on August 10, 2010, determined the Republican and Democratic nominees to be Rell's successor. Democrat Dan Malloy faced Republican Tom Foley in the election, with Malloy having beaten businessman Ned Lamont for the Democratic nomination and Foley having beaten Lieutenant Governor Michael Fedele and Oz Griebel for the GOP nod.

Candidates for Lieutenant Governor were also determined by primary voters, with Nancy Wyman clinching the Democratic nomination over Mary Glassman and Mark Boughton beating Lisa Wilson-Foley on the Republican side. While elected separately in primaries, each party's gubernatorial and lieutenant gubernatorial candidate run together on the same ballot line in general elections.

In the election, Dan Malloy was elected governor, defeating Foley 567,278 votes (49.50%) to 560,874 (48.95%).

==== Attorney General ====
Incumbent Democrat Richard Blumenthal opted not to seek another term as attorney general, and was instead his party's nominee for (and the winner of) the state's open U.S. Senate seat. Democratic candidate George Jepsen faced Republican Martha Dean in the election. Dean defeated Ross Garber to win the Republican nomination. With Blumenthal not running for re-election, the 2010 race was the first open attorney general election since 1990.

In the election, Jepsen defeated Dean.

==== Other constitutional officers ====
- Secretary of the State: Incumbent Democrat Susan Bysiewicz declined seeking another term, first intending to run for governor, then Attorney General. However, the Connecticut Supreme Court found her lacking the qualifications to serve as attorney general in May, and she decided to not seek any office in 2010. Republican candidate Jerry Farrell Jr. faced Democratic primary winner Denise Merrill in the election. Merrill defeated Gerry Garcia to win the Democratic nomination on August 10. In the election for Secretary of the State, Merrill defeated Farrell.
- Treasurer: Incumbent Democrat Denise Nappier ran for re-election against Republican challenger Jeff Wright and defeated him in the election.
- Comptroller: Incumbent Democrat Nancy Wyman declined seeking another term to instead run for lieutenant governor. Republican candidate Jack Orchulli faced Democratic primary winner Kevin Lembo, who defeated Michael Jarjura in the Democratic contest. In the election for comptroller, Lembo defeated Orchulli.

Comptroller results by county Lembo: 50–60%; Orchulli: 40–50%; 50–60%

Comptroller results by municipality Lembo: 40–50%; 50–60%; 60–70%; 70–80%; 80–90%; Orchulli: 40–50%; 50–60%; 60–70%; 70–80%

=== District offices ===
==== Connecticut State Senate ====
All 36 seats of the Connecticut Senate were up for election. The Democrats won 23 seats and the Republicans won 13 seats. The Republicans gained the 31st district. Winners served two-year terms which began in January 2011.

==== Connecticut House of Representatives ====
All 151 seats of the Connecticut House were up for election. The Democrats won 97 seats while Republicans won 54 seats. Winners served two-year terms which began in January 2011.

==== Judges of Probate ====
The state Probate Court system was realigned in 2009 to consolidate its 117 districts into 54 for the 2010 election cycle. The 54 judges elected to their new districts are serving four-year terms which began in January 2011.

== See also ==
- Elections in Connecticut
- Political party strength in Connecticut
