= 2012 Connecticut Senate election =

2012 Connecticut State Senate election
- November 6, 2012

All 36 seats in the Connecticut State Senate 19 seats needed for a majority
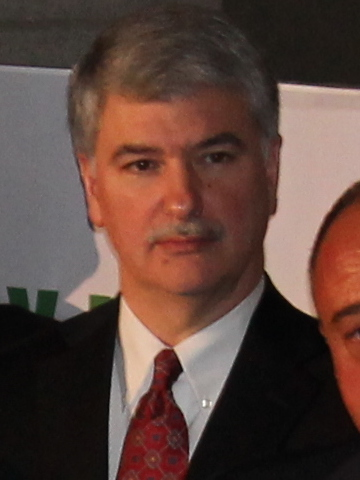

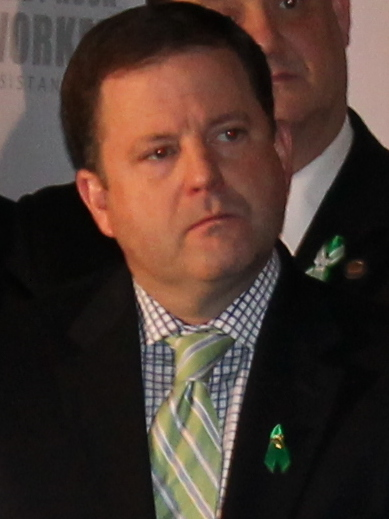
	Majority party	Minority party
Leader	Donald Williams	John McKinney
Party	Democratic	Republican
Leader since	July 1, 2004	June 2007
Leader's seat	29th	28th
Last election	23	13
Seats before	22	14
Seats after	22	14
Seat change	Steady	Steady
- Results: Democratic hold Democratic gain Republican hold Republican gain
President pro tempore of the Senate before election
Donald Williams
Democratic
Elected President pro tempore of the Senate
Donald Williams
Democratic

Elections for the Connecticut State Senate took place on November 6, 2012. 36 Seats were up for election

== Predictions ==
Source	Ranking	As of
Governing	Safe D	October 24, 2012

== Results ==
=== District 1 ===
Connecticut's 1st State Senate district election, 2012
Party	Candidate	Votes	%
Democratic	John Fonfara (incumbent)	20,678	80.7
Republican	Barbara Ruhe	4,447	17.4
Green	Jeffery Russell	488	1.9
Total votes		25,613	100.0
Democratic hold			

=== District 2 ===
Connecticut's 2nd State Senate district election, 2012
Party	Candidate	Votes	%
Democratic	Eric D. Coleman (incumbent)	31,114	85.5
Republican	Malvi Garcia Lennon	5,276	14.5
Total votes		36,390	100.0
Democratic hold			

=== District 3 ===
Connecticut's 3rd State Senate district election, 2012
Party	Candidate	Votes	%
Democratic	Gary LeBeau (incumbent)	27,640	70.6
Republican	Hector Reveron	11,531	29.4
Total votes		39,171	100.0
Democratic hold			

=== District 4 ===
Connecticut's 4th State Senate district election, 2012
Party	Candidate	Votes	%
Democratic	Steve Cassano (incumbent)	24,930	56.5
Republican	Cheri Ann Pelletier	19,184	43.5
Total votes		44,114	100.0
Democratic hold			

=== District 5 ===
Connecticut's 5th State Senate district election, 2012
Party	Candidate	Votes	%
Democratic	Beth Bye (incumbent)	34,542	100.0
Total votes		34,542	100.0
Democratic hold			

=== District 6 ===
Connecticut's 6th State Senate district election, 2012
Party	Candidate	Votes	%
Democratic	Terry Gerratana (incumbent)	21,212	72.1
Republican	Dwight Blint	8,211	27.9
Total votes		29,423	100.0
Democratic hold			

=== District 7 ===
Connecticut's 7th State Senate district election, 2012
Party	Candidate	Votes	%
Republican	John Kissel (incumbent)	22,182	50.6
Democratic	Karen Jarmoc	21,674	49.4
Total votes		43,856	100.0
Republican hold			

=== District 8 ===
Connecticut's 8th State Senate district election, 2012
Party	Candidate	Votes	%
Republican	Kevin Witkos (incumbent)	28,498	60.03
Democratic	Daniel J Seger	18,974	39.97
Total votes		47,472	100.0
Republican hold			
