= Connecticut's 13th State Senate district =

American legislative district

Senator
Jan Hochadel; D

Connecticut's 13th State Senate district elects one member of the Connecticut State Senate. It consists of the city of Meriden, as well as parts of Middlefield, Middletown and Cheshire. It is currently represented by Democrat Jan Hochadel, who has been serving since 2023.

== Recent elections ==
=== 2020 ===
2020 Connecticut State Senate election, District 13
Party	Candidate	Votes	%
Democratic	Mary Abrams (incumbent)	23,831	50.42
Republican	Len Suzio	20,799	44.01
Independent Party	Len Suzio	1,532	3.24
Working Families	Mary Abrams (incumbent)	1,102	2.33
Total votes		47,264	100.00
Democratic hold			

=== 2018 ===
2018 Connecticut State Senate election, District 13
Party	Candidate	Votes	%
Total	Mary Daugherty Abrams	19,502	52.4
Democratic	Mary Daugherty Abrams	18,381	49.4
Working Families	Mary Daugherty Abrams	1,121	3.0
Total	Len Suzio (Incumbent)	17,708	47.6
Republican	Len Suzio	16,866	45.3
Independent	Len Suzio	842	2.3
Total votes		37,210	100.0
Democratic gain from Republican			

=== 2016 ===
2016 Connecticut State Senate election, District 13
Party	Candidate	Votes	%
Democratic	Dante Bartolomeo (incumbent)	20,866	48.95
Republican	Len Suzio	21,761	51.05
Total votes		42,627	100.0
Republican gain from Democratic			

=== 2014 ===
2014 Connecticut State Senate election, District 13
Party	Candidate	Votes	%
Democratic	Dante Bartolomeo	13,918	46.6
Working Families	Dante Bartolomeo	1,122	3.8
Republican	Len Suzio	13,613	45.3
Independent	Len Suzio	1,193	4.0
Total votes		29,846	100.0
Democratic hold			

=== 2012 ===
2012 Connecticut State Senate election, District 13
Party	Candidate	Votes	%
Democratic	Dante Bartolomeo (incumbent)	19,934	50.4
Republican	Len Suzio	19,655	49.6
Total votes		39,589	100.0
Democratic gain from Republican			
