= Ed Gomes =

American politician (1936–2020)

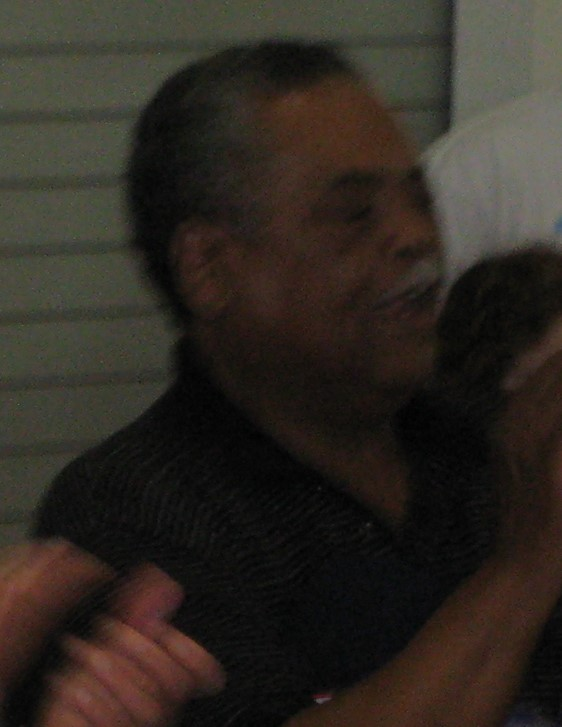
- Gomes in 2008

Member of the Connecticut State Senate from the 23rd district
- In office February 27, 2015 – January 2019
- Preceded by: Andres Ayala
- Succeeded by: Dennis Bradley
- In office November 2005 – January 9, 2013
- Preceded by: Ernie Newton
- Succeeded by: Andres Ayala

Personal details
- Born: February 25, 1936 New Bedford, Massachusetts, U.S.
- Died: December 22, 2020 (aged 84) Bridgeport, Connecticut, U.S.
- Party: Working Families

Edwin A. Gomes (February 25, 1936 – December 22, 2020) was an American politician, a Working Families party member of the Connecticut State Senate, representing District 23, which includes Bridgeport. He was elected to the chamber in a special election on February 24, 2015, and served until 2019. He previously served in the chamber, representing the same district, from November 2005 to January 2013.

== Personal life ==
Gomes served in the United States Army from 1958 to 1963 and then worked as a Laborer/Annealer for Carpenter Steel from 1963 to 1977 and International Representative of District 1 for the United Steelworkers of America.

On December 13, 2020, Gomes suffered serious head injuries during a car crash in Bridgeport, and died from his injuries on December 22, 2020, at the age of 84.

== Political career ==
Gomes served on the Bridgeport City Council from 1983 to 1989 and again from 1999 to 2005. He was elected to the Connecticut Senate in 2004, serving from 2005 to 2013. After losing the Democratic primary in 2012 against Andres Ayala, he decided to run again in the special election in early 2015, but the Democratic leadership decided to give the nomination to someone else. However, the local Working Families Party gave him their spot on the ballot and he was elected with 49% of the vote in a three-way race, becoming the party's first candidate outside the state of New York to win office.

Together with Republican Prasad Srinivasan and Democrat Minnie Gonzalez, Gomes was one of only three members of the Judiciary Committee voting against the 2018 reconfirmation of the controversial family court judge Jane B. Emons, who ended up not being reconfirmed despite the positive committee vote.
