= Art Linares =

American politician (born 1987)

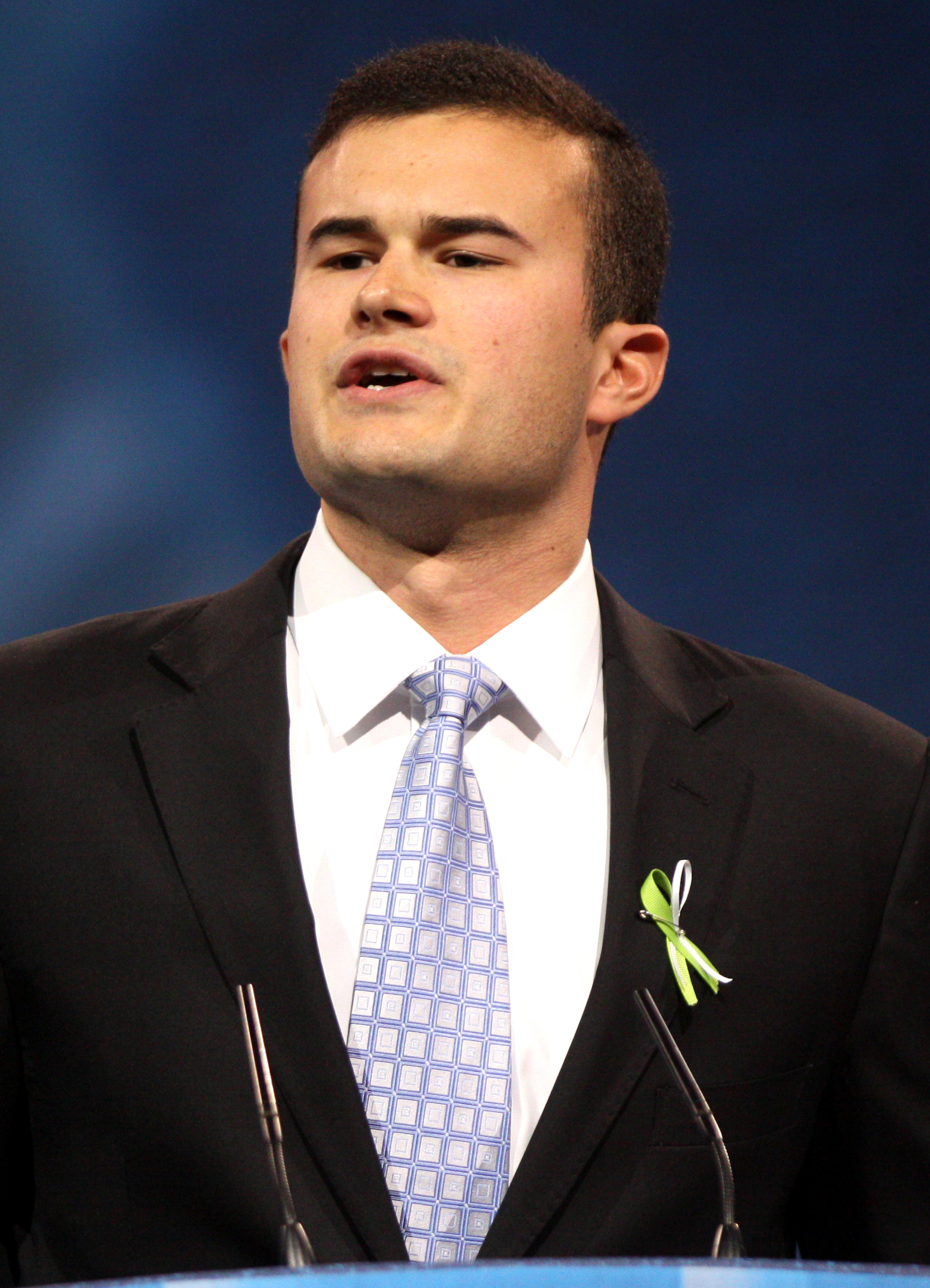

Member of the Connecticut State Senate from the 33rd District
- In office 2013–2019
- Preceded by: Eileen Daily
- Succeeded by: Norman Needleman
- Constituency: represents Chester, Clinton, Colchester, Deep River, East Haddam, East Hampton, Essex, Haddam, Lyme, Old Saybrook (part), Portland, and Westbrook

Personal details
- Born: October 31, 1987 (age 38) Livingston, New Jersey, U.S.
- Party: Republican
- Spouse: Caroline Simmons (m. 2017)

Art Linares or Art Linares Jr. (born October 31, 1987) is an American politician who served as a Republican member of the Connecticut State Senate from 2013-2019. Linares was the Senator for the 33rd Senate District, representing the Connecticut River Valley, including the towns of Chester, Clinton, Colchester, Deep River, East Haddam, East Hampton, Essex, Haddam, Lyme, Old Saybrook (part), Portland, and Westbrook.

== Early life and education ==
Linares is the son of Art Linares Sr., a Cuban exile. He was raised in Westbrook, Connecticut, and has one sister and one brother. Linares earned a Bachelor of Science degree in entrepreneurship from the University of Tampa.

At the age of 19, he and his sister's boyfriend, Michael Silvestrini, came up with the idea for Green Skies, a solar company. In 2012, the company won a large $30 million contract from Walmart to install solar panels in 27 of its stores.

At some point before 2013, Linares interned for Senator Marco Rubio in Washington.

== Political career ==
In 2012, Linares ran for state office touting his experience as a small business owner. He won the race for State Senator for the 33rd District with 1,652 votes; his closet opponent garnered 1,414 votes.

Linares served in the Connecticut Senate for 3 terms. While in the Senate, Linares became the ranking Republican on the Planning and Development Committee.

In 2017, Linares explored a run for numerous statewide offices. At the time, he and his wife, Caroline Simmons (D-Stamford) were both state senators, on different sides of the aisle maintaining separate residences. In January 2018, Linares settled on the State Treasurer's race. He received support from many of his State Senate colleagues but failed to raise enough money to qualify for the Citizens' Election Program and could not assemble enough support to win at the Connecticut GOP convention and was subsequently defeated by Salisbury investment executive, Thad Gray. Linares' campaign was also hurt by having voted for DACA immigration bills in the Connecticut legislature. Linares decided to challenge Gray in the August primary, fired his campaign manager, hired a Washington DC–based campaign manager, and considered running as an independent.

== Controversy ==
Linares aroused controversy by touting his experience running a small business on the campaign trail. Linares claims that he had co-founded and ran Greenskies, a solar energy company, but Linares was residing in Tampa, Florida during Greenskies' early years and was never involved in the day-to-day management of the company. Greenskies was built and funded by Linares's father, Art Linares Sr. and Mike Silvestrini, the company's president, although Linares was recorded as a co-founder and did appear to have received some of the profit from the company's sale in 2017.

== Personal life ==
Linares is married to Democratic politician, Caroline Simmons. Linares and his wife met when he was a State Senator and she was a State Representative on opposite sides of the aisle. Linares proposed by taking out a full page advertisement in the Stamford Advocate. In 2018, during his run for State Treasurer, his wife was expecting the couple's first child. Caroline Simmons is now the Mayor of Stamford, Connecticut.

== See also ==
- Connecticut Senate
