= Connecticut's 29th State Senate district =

American legislative district

Senator
Mae Flexer; D

Connecticut's 29th State Senate district elects one member of the Connecticut State Senate. It consists of the towns of Brooklyn, Canterbury, Killingly, Mansfield, Scotland, Putnam, Thompson, and Windham. It has been represented by Democrat Mae Flexer since 2015.

== Recent elections ==
=== 2020 ===
2020 Connecticut State Senate election, District 29
Party	Candidate	Votes	%
Democratic	Mae Flexer (incumbent)	19,617	49.07
Republican	Jessica Alba	17,862	44.68
Independent Party	Jessica Alba	1,241	3.10
Working Families	Mae Flexer (incumbent)	1,261	3.15
Total votes		39,981	100.00
Democratic hold			

=== 2018 ===
2018 Connecticut State Senate election, District 29
Party	Candidate	Votes	%
Total	Mae Flexer (incumbent)	18,915	56.3
Democratic	Mae Flexer	17,794	53.0
Working Families	Mae Flexer	1,121	3.3
Total	David Coderre	14,679	43.7
Republican	David Coderre	13,706	40.8
Independent	David Coderre	973	2.9
Total votes		33,594	100.0
Democratic hold			

=== 2016 ===
2016 Connecticut State Senate election, District 29
Party	Candidate	Votes	%
Democratic	Mae Flexer (incumbent)	22,180	54.82
Republican	John French	18,280	45.18
Total votes		40,460	100.00
Democratic hold			

=== 2014 ===
2014 Connecticut State Senate election, District 29
Party	Candidate	Votes	%
Democratic	Mae Flexer	11,537	46.6
Republican	John French	10,850	43,80
Independent Party	John French	1,266	5.10
Working Families	Mae Flexer	1,099	4.4
Total votes		24,752	100.00
Democratic hold			

=== 2012 ===
2012 Connecticut State Senate election, District 29
Party	Candidate	Votes	%
Democratic	Donald E. Williams Jr. (incumbent)	21,567	62.4
Republican	Sally White	13,007	37.6
Total votes		34,574	100.00
Democratic hold			
