= North Haven Mall =

Proposed shopping mall in North Haven, Connecticut

Coordinates: 41.391°N 72.869°W

The North Haven Mall was a shopping mall proposed for construction in North Haven, Connecticut.

== Land acquisition ==
A North Haven town meeting authorized sale of land for the mall at $18,000 an acre, for a total of $507,600 in 1973. Developer Mall Properties, Inc. of New York began paying the town $2,500 a month in September, 1975 to maintain an option on the land. In addition, in August 1978, Mall Properties began paying $6,000 more per month for engineering fees. This went toward planned geographic changes; a widening of Washington Avenue, extending Valley Service Road over train tracks with a new bridge, connecting North Haven with Wallingford at Toelles Road. Valley Service Road would also be widened from two lanes to six.

The overall land area was 117.5 acres (47.6 ha) in size, bounded by the Quinnipiac River on the west, and I-91 on the east. Often singled out for particular mention by the media were 28.2 acres between Stillman Road and Quinnipiac River, likely because they were the first land purchased. Aside from the town's sale, there were three other land owners dealt with in private transactions.

== Features and support ==
The two-story mall was envisioned as $40 million and 900,000 square feet, and enlarged to $150 million and 1.1 million square feet. At the time, it would have been the largest enclosed mall in the state. Four anchor stores committed, G. Fox & Co., J. C. Penney, Macy's, and Sears. There would also have been a hundred smaller shops. A recreational facility could have been constructed, using land from a pond that would be dredged during development. The Mall would be located on a street named Mall Drive.

The city of North Haven cited the necessity of progress, estimated $2.5 million in possible tax revenue, and the creation of up to 3,000 permanent new jobs. There would also be the benefit of payrolls of approximately $15 million for local and area construction workers. The mall was given the endorsement of Meriden City Manager Dana Miller, despite an existing mall in Meriden.

== Opposition ==
The mall was opposed by Frank Logue, Mayor of New Haven, on grounds that the suburban mall would drain urban business away. Logue subsequently uncovered federal laws; Section 10 of the Rivers and Harbors Act of 1899, and Section 404 of the Clean Water Act, requiring a permit from the Army Corps of Engineers to build on wetland. Approximately 56 acres (23 ha) of the land was wetlands, and the developers' plan was to fill 31 acres (13 ha).

This prompted First Selectman Walter Gawrych to order a full reassessment of relations with New Haven, based on "unparalleled interference on the part of a large city with the affairs of a small town". Nevertheless, the mall continued to be opposed by Logue's successor, Mayor Biagio DiLieto.

There was also opposition from Stop the Mall, led by Roberta Friedman; a group of locals concerned about traffic (projected to be 42,000 weekday trips, and 56,000 Saturday trips), taxes, and other effects on the town. Opponents also cited the effects of urbanization, air pollution generated by increased traffic, merchants subjected to high rents, and a local inundation of fast food restaurants. Stop the Mall was provided technical assistance by the Connecticut Citizen Action Group (CCAG).

As the fight over the mall dragged on, Stop the Mall cited in 1979 the difference between the sale price and the then-current fair market land value, the resulting net loss to the town, and absence of property taxes.

The United States Department of Housing and Urban Development (HUD) conducted an independent study in 1980 at the requests of DiLieto and the Army, predicting that the mall would result in "substantial losses of trade, tenants, and future investment potential" in regional towns.

Although initially granting a favorable report, the Corps denied a permit to the town, "concluding the project was contrary to the public interest". Contributing factors were an adverse impact New Haven's economic development and, Governor of Connecticut, William O'Neill's statement at a July 1985 meeting that building the North Haven Mall was not worth the risk to New Haven.

Media considered the battle over the mall to come to an end in August, 1985, when "officials" related that on the grounds that the mall would be a detriment to the neighboring city of New Haven, resulting in a loss of up to 20 percent in retail business. Still, court battles continued to be fought.

A district court found in 1987 that the Corps had exceeded its authority. New Haven challenged the decision in 1988, feeling that it had as good as granted permission for the mall to proceed. The United States Court of Appeals for the First Circuit dismissed the case, explaining that Mall Properties' process had only moved to another forum and had not yet been realized.

New Haven took the case to the Supreme Court in 1988, but was denied its request for a writ of certiorari. Nevertheless, the mall was never constructed.

== Aftermath ==
The "strategy New Haven itself had pioneered to fight North Haven's mall" was later used against it, when the city of Milford halted New Haven's plans to build the New Haven Galleria in the late-1990s and early-2000s.

Although a mall was never built in North Haven, the nearby Universal Drive later turned into "retail focal point" for the area.
