= New Haven Galleria =

Proposed shopping mall in Connecticut, United States

Coordinates: 41.296°N 72.920°W

The New Haven Galleria at Long Wharf was a shopping mall proposed for construction in New Haven, Connecticut by mayoral candidate Wally Grigo in 1993.

Although Grigo did not win the election, his idea was embraced in a March 1996 announcement by Mayor John DeStefano, Jr. for a $500 million project that would have been completed by 2001. In September 1997, DeStefano spoke of the Galleria as a "high-end mall that will not just make the city proud, but will serve the entire region with distinction."

Although "developers from around the world competed to build the mall", the mayor insisted that the winning developer use a local construction family, the Fuscos, who were "major political fund-raisers for the mayor". The contract was eventually awarded to New England Development of Newton.

== Features ==
The Galleria was to have been 1,200,000 square feet (110,000 m^{2}), housing at least 150 stores. Nordstrom, Macy's, Filene's, and Lord & Taylor had committed to the project. The mall was estimated to create 3,000 jobs and bring in $7 million in annual property taxes. It would have been encircled by a newly constructed road, Galleria Drive., and connected with Downtown New Haven by an electric trolley system.

A unique feature of the mall was to have been a "retail academy", used as a "training ground for people who want to work for the stores and management".

== Support and opposition ==
Local newspaper, the New Haven Register, supported the mall - to the point of a "publisher's memo ordering the newsroom to play down any negative news". Support for the mall also came from opponents of the proposed University Place shopping center in Downtown New Haven.

The Galleria was strongly opposed by the rival Westfield Connecticut Post, which filed over 15 lawsuits against its construction. Westfield also formed a group called the "Save Our Downtown Alliance", allegedly defending the interests of local merchants, while simultaneously threatening potential anchor stores and national chains with 'site retribution' if they located at Long Wharf. Mall opponents characterized it "as a corporate welfare-bloated traffic and environmental nightmare that would kill downtown shops." In December 2000, Nordstrom withdrew its offer to anchor. Westfield bought the site for $20 million in a 2001 settlement of litigation over the failed plan to build the mall.

New Haven had used a similar strategy decades earlier to defeat neighboring North Haven's plans to build a mall.

== Aftermath ==
A portion of the land is now occupied by a 306,000-square-foot (28,400 m^{2}) IKEA store, which broke ground in 2003. In 2004, DeStefano said, "In some ways, IKEA is the mall that was never built. There's no doubt that IKEA really answered the question of what [the site] can be."

The attention given to the Galleria has been credited with stalling, and eventually giving way to, the revitalization of Downtown New Haven.
