= Gary Winfield =

American politician

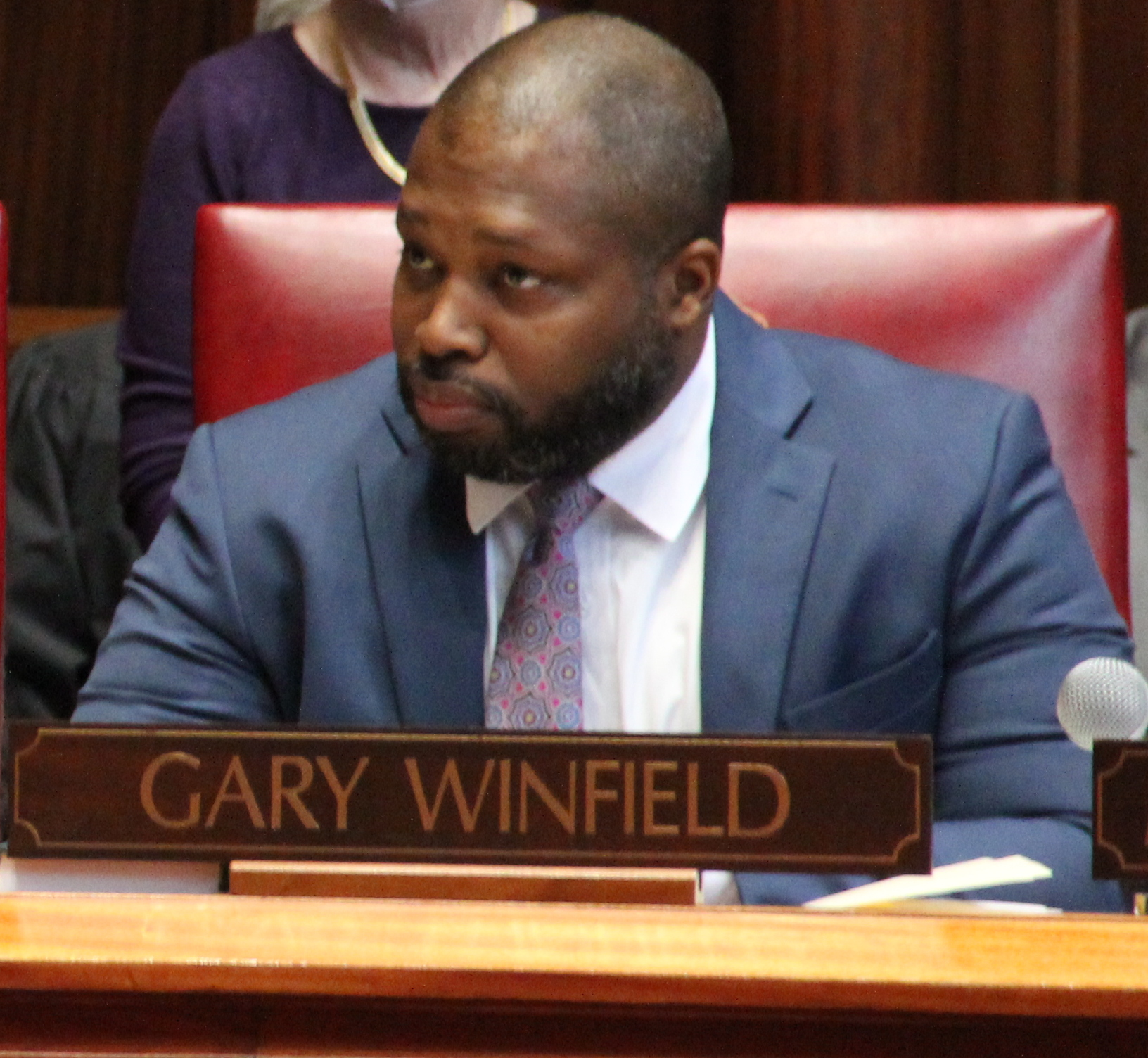
- Winfield in 2023

Member of the Connecticut State Senate from the 10th district
- Incumbent
- Assumed office February 28, 2014
- Preceded by: Toni Harp

Member of the Connecticut House of Representatives from the 94th district
- In office January 2009 – February 28, 2014
- Preceded by: William Dyson
- Succeeded by: Robyn Porter

Personal details
- Born: March 11, 1974 (age 52) New York City, New York, U.S.
- Party: Democratic
- Spouse: Rasheda
- Education: Southern Connecticut State University (BA)

Gary A. Winfield (born March 11, 1974) is an American politician from the state of Connecticut and member of the Democratic Party. He serves in the Connecticut State Senate, representing the 10th district. From 2009 to 2014 he served as a State Representative from the 94th Assembly District. Winfield served as Deputy Majority Leader in his tenure as a State Representative.

== Biography ==
Winfield was raised in The Bronx, a Borough of New York City, by his mother. He graduated from Westbury High School in Old Westbury, New York. He served in the United States Navy from 1994 to 2000 and became a Nuclear Electrician's Mate. He attended Southern Connecticut State University from 2003 to 2006 and received a bachelor of science in political science. He works for the American Association of University Professors.

== Career ==
Shortly after entering the house Winfield was the lead sponsor of a bill to abolish the death penalty in Connecticut. The freshman's efforts led to the first successful passage of the bill in either chamber of the legislature. While Winfield was successful in getting the bill to the governor's desk it was vetoed. Several years later a subsequent attempt led to the passage and signing by then Governor Dan Malloy.

Winfield was also the driving force behind a bill which put in place protections for transgender citizens in public accommodation which would later be used against him in his run for his senate seat. He was also the force behind the TRUST ACT which was the first statewide passage of such a bill in the country, several police accountability bills, the first in the nation racial and ethnic impact statement on demand without restrictions, and prosecutorial transparency bill along with several other progressive wins. Winfield is the first non attorney to serve as co-chair of the state’s Judiciary Committee.

Winfield, along with state rep, Patricia Dillon, proposed a bill which would declare pizza the official state food of Connecticut. Justin Elicker, the mayor of New Haven, testified in support of the bill.

In 2026, Winfield was elected to be the Senate Majority Leader by members of the majority Democratic party for the Session that begins on January 6, 2027. With this election Winfield is the first Black leader in either the House or Senate chamber in the state of Connecticut.

== Electoral history ==
Winfield was first elected to the Connecticut House in 2008. In 2013, he declared his candidacy for Mayor of New Haven, but he dropped out and endorsed Toni Harp, a member of the Connecticut Senate.

Following Harp's election as mayor, Winfield declared his candidacy in the special election to succeed Harp in representing the 10th district in the Connecticut Senate. He won with 75% of the vote.

== Personal ==
Born as a Catholic, Winfield now identifies as Baptist. He met Natalie, his first wife, in high school. They divorced in 2014. Winfield married his second wife, Rasheda, in 2016. Rasheda brought two children into the marriage and on February 11, 2018 the couple welcomed twins Imani Harriet and Gary Rashid to the family.
