= 1992 Connecticut Senate election =

1992 Connecticut State Senate election
- November 3, 1992

All 36 seats in the Connecticut State Senate 19 seats needed for a majority
	Majority party	Minority party
Leader	Cornelius O'Leary (resigned)	M. Adela Eads
Party	Democratic	Republican
Leader since	November 1984	January 1991
Leader's seat	7th	30th
Last election	20	16
Seats won	20	16
Seat change	Steady	Steady
- Results: Democratic hold Democratic gain Republican hold Republican gain
President pro tempore before election
John B. Larson
Democratic
Elected President pro tempore
John B. Larson
Democratic

The 1992 Connecticut State Senate election was held on November 3, 1992 as part of the biennial 1992 United States elections. Primary elections took place on September 15, 1992. All 36 seats were up for re-election. Senators serve two year terms and are up for re-election every election cycle.

The Democrats and Republicans lost and gained two seats each. This left the 20-16 divide from the previous election cycle unchanged, with the Democrats retaining control of the chamber.

== Retirements ==
=== Democrats ===
1. District 9: Cynthia Matthews retired.
2. District 11: Anthony V. Avallone retired.
3. District 17: Gary A. Hale retired.
4. District 18: Steven Spellman retired.
5. District 23: Margaret E. Morton retired.
6. District 31: Steven C. Casey retired.

=== Republicans ===
1. District 14: Max Case retired.
2. District 20: Lawrence J. Bettencourt retired.
3. District 33: Edward W. Munster retired to run for CT-02.

== Special elections ==
=== District 10 ===
Connecticut's 10th State Senate district special election, 1991
Party	Candidate	Votes	%
Democratic	Charles H. Allen III	2,881	54.11%
Republican	Bryan Anderson	2,443	45.89%
Total votes		5,324	100.00%
Democratic hold			

== Incumbents defeated ==
=== In primary election ===
==== Democrats ====
1. District 2: Frank D. Barrows lost re-nomination to Thirman L. Milner.
2. District 10: Charles H. Allen III lost re-nomination to Toni Harp.

=== In general election ===
==== Democrats ====
1. District 35: Marie Herbst lost reelection to Tony Guglielmo.

== Results ==
=== District 1 ===
Connecticut's 1st State Senate district election, 1992
Party	Candidate	Votes	%
Democratic	William A. DiBella	13,261	57.36%
A Connecticut Party	William A. DiBella	3,475	15.03%
Total	William A. DiBella (incumbent)	16,736	72.39%
Republican	Patrick L. Kennedy	6,383	27.61%
Total votes		23,119	100.00%
Democratic hold			

=== District 2 ===
September 15, 1992 Democratic primary
Party	Candidate	Votes	%
Democratic	Thirman L. Milner	3,035	59.10%
Democratic	Frank D. Barrows (incumbent)	2,100	40.90%
Total votes		5,135	100.00%

Connecticut's 2nd State Senate district election, 1992
Party	Candidate	Votes	%
Democratic	Thirman L. Milner	15,805	61.35%
A Connecticut Party	Frank D. Barrows (incumbent)	5,540	21.50%
Republican	Patricia Stryker	4,419	17.15%
Total votes		25,764	100.00%
Democratic hold			

=== District 3 ===
Connecticut's 3rd State Senate district election, 1992
Party	Candidate	Votes	%
Democratic	John B. Larson (incumbent)	26,623	70.59%
Republican	Peter J. Nevers	11,091	29.41%
Total votes		37,714	100.00%
Democratic hold			

=== District 4 ===
Connecticut's 4th State Senate district election, 1992
Party	Candidate	Votes	%
Democratic	Michael Meotti	18,675	40.09%
A Connecticut Party	Michael Meotti	9,440	20.26%
Total	Michael Meotti (incumbent)	28,115	60.35%
Republican	Chris Powell	18,469	39.65%
Total votes		46,584	100.00%
Democratic hold			

=== District 5 ===
Connecticut's 5th State Senate district election, 1992
Party	Candidate	Votes	%
Democratic	Kevin Sullivan	23,648	45.93%
A Connecticut Party	Kevin Sullivan	10,820	21.01%
Total	Kevin Sullivan (incumbent)	34,468	66.94%
Republican	Bruce Boisture	17,026	33.06%
Total votes		51,494	100.00%
Democratic hold			

=== District 6 ===
Connecticut's 6th State Senate district election, 1992
Party	Candidate	Votes	%
Democratic	Joseph H. Harper Jr.	14,327	48.82%
A Connecticut Party	Joseph H. Harper Jr.	4,772	16.26%
Total	Joseph H. Harper Jr. (incumbent)	19,099	65.08%
Republican	Mark Ferrante	10,247	34.92%
Total votes		29,346	100.00%
Democratic hold			

=== District 7 ===
Connecticut's 7th State Senate district election, 1992
Party	Candidate	Votes	%
Democratic	Cornelius O'Leary (incumbent)	21,827	57.27%
Republican	John Kissel	16,287	42.73%
Total votes		38,114	100.00%
Democratic hold			

=== District 8 ===
Connecticut's 8th State Senate district election, 1992
Party	Candidate	Votes	%
Republican	James T. Fleming (incumbent)	27,277	58.89%
Democratic	Bill Rocks	12,440	26.86%
A Connecticut Party	James B. Lowell Jr.	6,598	14.25%
Total votes		46,315	100.00%
Republican hold			

=== District 9 ===
Connecticut's 9th State Senate district election, 1992
Party	Candidate	Votes	%
Democratic	Richard J. Balducci	18,106	40.77%
A Connecticut Party	Richard J. Balducci	9,938	22.38%
Total	Richard J. Balducci	28,044	63.15%
Republican	Christopher V. White	16,367	36.85%
Total votes		44,411	100.00%
Democratic hold			

=== District 10 ===
September 15, 1992 Democratic primary
Party	Candidate	Votes	%
Democratic	Toni Harp	2,959	54.25%
Democratic	Charles H. Allen III (incumbent)	2,495	45.75%
Total votes		5,454	100.00%

Connecticut's 10th State Senate district election, 1992
Party	Candidate	Votes	%
Democratic	Toni Harp	15,752	73.10%
Republican	John Coppola	5,797	26.90%
Total votes		21,549	100.00%
Democratic hold			

=== District 11 ===
Connecticut's 11th State Senate district election, 1992
Party	Candidate	Votes	%
Democratic	Martin M. Looney	16,665	58.19%
A Connecticut Party	Martin M. Looney	3,496	12.21%
Total	Martin M. Looney	20,161	70.40%
Republican	Liz Altham	8,003	27.95%
Tax The Rich	Patrick Steele	473	1.65%
Total votes		28,637	100.00%
Democratic hold			

=== District 12 ===
Incumbent Republican Senator William Aniskovich won re-election to a second term against Shelley Marcus, the daughter of former New Haven state Senator Edward L. Marcus.

Connecticut's 12th State Senate district election, 1992
Party	Candidate	Votes	%
Republican	William Aniskovich (incumbent)	24,139	52.81%
Total	Shelley Marcus	21,569	47.19%
Democratic	Shelley Marcus	15,539	34.00%
A Connecticut Party	Shelley Marcus	6,030	13.19%
Total votes		45,708	100.00%
Republican hold			

=== District 13 ===
Connecticut's 13th State Senate district election, 1992
Party	Candidate	Votes	%
Democratic	Amelia Mustone	13,811	40.05%
A Connecticut Party	Amelia Mustone	5,378	15.60%
Total	Amelia Mustone (incumbent)	19,189	55.65%
Republican	Walter Shamock	15,295	44.35%
Total votes		34,484	100.00%
Democratic hold			

=== District 26 ===
Connecticut's 26th State Senate district election, 1992
Party	Candidate	Votes	%
Republican	Judith Freedman (incumbent)	27,607	56.54%
Total	Ann E. Sheffer	21,222	43.46%
Democratic	Ann E. Sheffer	15,639	32.02%
A Connecticut Party	Ann E. Sheffer	5,583	11.44%
Total votes		48,829	100.00%
Republican hold			

=== District 33 ===
Connecticut's 33rd State Senate district election, 1992
Party	Candidate	Votes	%
Democratic	Eileen Daily	18,034	38.43%
A Connecticut Party	Eileen Daily	8,893	18.95%
Total	Eileen Daily	26,927	57.38%
Republican	J. Peter Fusscas	19,998	42.62%
Total votes		46,925	100.00%
Democratic gain from Republican			

=== District 36 ===
Connecticut's 36th State Senate district election, 1992
Party	Candidate	Votes	%
Republican	William H. Nickerson (incumbent)	28,456	66.58%
Democratic	Peter Gasparino	14,285	33.42%
Total votes		42,741	100.00%
Republican hold			
