= Lanson (disambiguation) =

Lanson is a Champagne producer.

Lanson may also refer to:

- Gustave Lanson, a French historian
- Snooky Lanson, an American singer
- William Lanson, a leader of New Haven's Black community
