= Mayoral elections in New Haven, Connecticut =

Since the 1870s, mayoral elections have been held every two years to elect the mayor of New Haven, Connecticut.

== 2001 ==
2001 New Haven mayoral election
- November 6, 2001
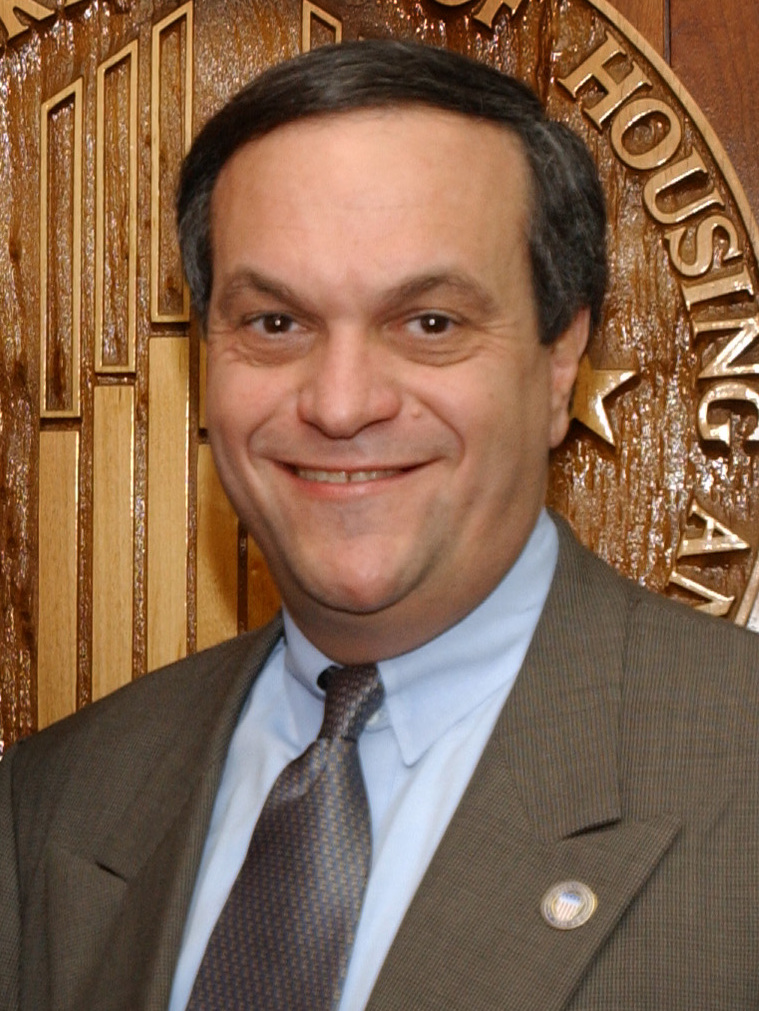

Candidate	John DeStefano Jr.	Joel Schiavone
Party	Democratic	Republican
Popular vote	14,107	4,465
Percentage	74.44%	23.56%
Mayor before election
John DeStefano Jr.
Democratic
Elected mayor
John DeStefano Jr.
Democratic

The 2001 New Haven mayoral election was held on November 6, 2001.

Incumbent mayor John DeStefano Jr. won re-election to a fifth term, defeating Republican nominee Joel Schiavone in the general election.

=== Democratic primary ===
The Democratic primary took place on September 11, 2001, the same day as the terrorist attacks. Because of this, voter turnout was significantly lower than expected. Of the 37,295 eligible voters for the Democratic primary, only 15,871 (42.5%) turned out to vote.

Incumbent mayor John DeStefano Jr. won re-nomination, defeating state Senator Martin Looney of the 11th district, which covered much of eastern New Haven.

September 11, 2001 Democratic primary
Party	Candidate	Votes	%
Democratic	John DeStefano Jr. (incumbent)	9,919	62.50%
Democratic	Martin Looney	5,952	37.50%
Total votes		15,871	100.00%

Democratic primary results by ward

Results by ward
Ward	DeStefano		Looney		Total
Ward	Votes	%	Votes	%	Votes
1	212	93.8%	14	6.2%	226
2	283	70.9%	116	29.1%	399
3	349	%	212	%	561
4	221	%	145	%	366
5	266	%	98	%	364
6	287	%	179	%	466
7	230	%	94	%	324
8	295	%	221	%	516
9	291	%	159	%	450
10	385	%	255	%	640
11A	311	%	352	%	663
11B	48	%	47	%	95
12	309	%	192	%	501
13	296	%	296	%	592
14	306	%	268	%	574
15	319	%	290	%	609
16	201	%	289	%	490
17	340	%	329	%	669
18	363	%	429	%	792
19	334	%	137	%	471
20	499	%	256	%	755
21	363	%	119	%	482
22	275	%	96	%	371
23A	83	%	36	%	119
23B	164	%	57	%	221
24	418	%	136	%	554
25	528	%	300	%	828
26A	576	%	199	%	775
26B	79	%	30	%	109
27	402	%	163	%	565
28	419	%	187	%	606
29	197	%	133	%	330
30A	146	%	55	%	201
30B	124	%	63	%	187
Totals	9,919	62.5%	5,952	37.5%	15,871

=== General election ===
2001 New Haven mayoral election
Party	Candidate	Votes	%
Democratic	John DeStefano Jr. (incumbent)	14,107	74.44%
Republican	Joel Schiavone	4,465	23.56%
Petitioning Candidate	Henri L. Sumner	353	1.86%
Write-in	William Saunders	17	0.09%
Write-in	Roger Uihlein	9	0.05%
Total votes		18,951	100.00%
Democratic hold			

== 2013 ==
2013 New Haven mayoral election
- November 5, 2013
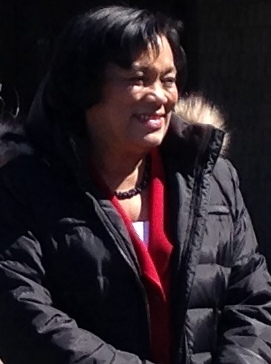

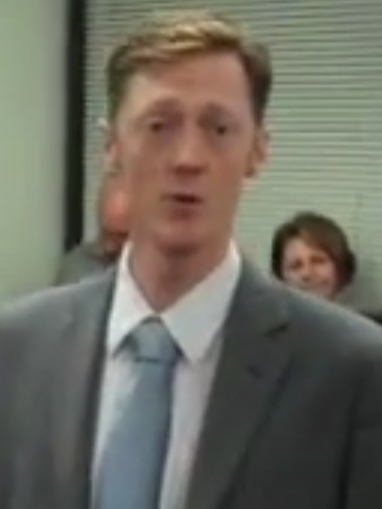
Candidate	Toni Harp	Justin Elicker
Party	Democratic	Independent
Popular vote	11,362	9,417
Percentage	54.68%	45.32%
Mayor before election
John DeStefano Jr.
Democratic
Elected mayor
Toni Harp
Democratic

The 2013 New Haven mayoral election was held on November 5, 2013. It saw the reelection of Democrat Toni Harp, who became the city's first female mayor.

Ten-term incumbent mayor John DeStefano Jr. did not run for reelection.

=== Democratic primary ===
The Democratic primary was held on September 10.

Voter turnout in the primary was estimated at 29%.

Candidates that were on the ballot were state senator Toni Harp, political newcomer Justin Elicker, economic development administrator Henry Fernandez, and Hillhouse High School principal Kermit Carolina. Candidates that had been running for the nomination, but withdrew before the primary, were Matthew Nemerson, state representative Gary Holder-Winfield and Sundiata Keitazulu.

2013 New Haven mayoral Democratic primary election results
Party	Candidate	Votes	%
Democratic	Toni Harp (incumbent)	7,327	49.77%
Democratic	Justin Elicker	3,417	23.21%
Democratic	Henry Fernandez	2,784	18.91%
Democratic	Kermit Carolina	1,195	8.12%
Total votes		14,723	

=== General election ===
After losing to Harp in the Democratic primary, Elicker ran against her again in the general election as an independent candidate.

2013 New Haven mayoral general election results
Party	Candidate	Votes	%
Democratic	Toni Harp (incumbent)	11,362	54.68%
Independent	Justin Elicker	9,417	45.32%
Total votes		20,779	

== 2015 ==
2015 New Haven mayoral election
- November 3, 2015
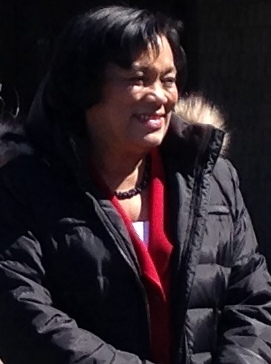

Candidate	Toni Harp	Ronald Smith
Party	Democratic	Independent
Popular vote	10,784	1,070
Percentage	88.83%	8.81%
Mayor before election
Toni Harp
Democratic
Elected mayor
Toni Harp
Democratic

The 2015 New Haven mayoral election was held on November 3, 2015. It saw the reelection of Democratic incumbent Toni Harp to a second term.

Voter turnout was less than 20%.

Harp won all of the city's 30 wards.

General election results
Party	Candidate	Votes	%
Democratic	Toni Harp (incumbent)	10,784	88.83%
Independent	Ronald Smith	1,070	8.81%
Independent	Sundiata Keitazulu	269	2.22%
Independent	Roger Uihlein (write-in)	17	0.14%
Total votes		12,140	

== 2017 ==
2017 New Haven mayoral election
- November 8, 2017
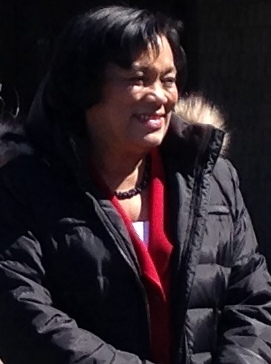

Candidate	Toni Harp	Marcus Paca	Sarah Ganong
Party	Democratic	Independent	Working Families
Popular vote	8,807	1,672	880
Percentage	77.53%	14.72%	7.75%
Mayor before election
Toni Harp
Democratic
Elected mayor
Toni Harp
Democratic

The 2017 New Haven mayoral election was held on November 8, 2017. It saw the reelection of Democratic incumbent Toni Harp to a third term.

=== Democratic primary ===
The Democratic primary was held on September 12. Voter turnout was roughly 20%.

Democratic primary election results
Party	Candidate	Votes	%
Democratic	Toni Harp (incumbent)	5,788	74.54
Democratic	Marcus Paca	1,977	25.46
Total votes		7,765	

=== General election ===
Paca, who had lost the Democratic primary to Harp, ran as an independent. While he remained on the ballot, and ultimately placed second, he had withdrawn before the election.

Harp won all of the city's 30 wards.

General election results
Party	Candidate	Votes	%
Democratic	Toni Harp (incumbent)	8,807	77.53
Independent	Marcus Paca	1,672	14.72
Working Families	Sarah Ganong	880	7.75
Total votes		11,359	

== 2019 ==
2019 New Haven mayoral election
- November 5, 2019
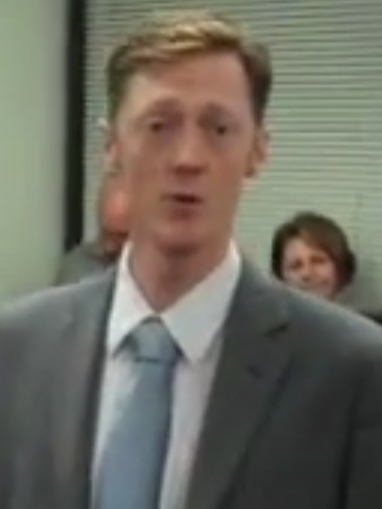

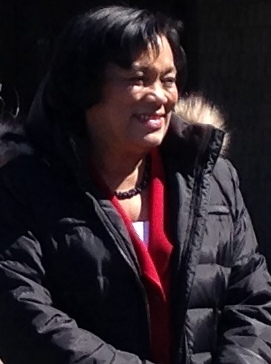
Candidate	Justin Elicker	Toni Harp
Party	Democratic	Working Families
Popular vote	12,296	5,034
Percentage	68.89%	28.20%
Mayor before election
Toni Harp
Democratic
Elected mayor
Justin Elicker
Democratic

The 2019 New Haven mayoral election was held on November 5, 2019. Third-term incumbent mayor Toni Harp was defeated by Justin Elicker in both the Democratic primary and the general election. Ellicker and Harp had previously faced each other in the 2013 mayoral election.

=== Democratic primary ===
The Democratic primary was held on September 10.

Democratic primary election results
Party	Candidate	Votes	%
Democratic	Justin Elicker	7,198	58.29
Democratic	Toni Harp (incumbent)	5,150	41.71

=== General election ===
General election results
Party	Candidate	Votes	%
Democratic	Justin Elicker	12,296	68.89
Working Families	Toni Harp (incumbent)	5,034	28.20
Write-in	Seth L. Poole	98	0.55
Write-in	Roger Uihlein	2	0.01
Total votes		17,849	

Results by ward

Results by ward
Ward	Elicker (D)		Harp (WF)		Write-in/other		Total
Ward	Votes	%	Votes	%	Votes	%	Total
1	351	79.6%	61	13.83%	29	6.58%	441
2	212	61.1%	126	36.31%	9	2.59%	347
3	179	47.9%	166	44.39%	29	7.75%	374
4	175	52.9%	146	44.11%	10	3.02%	331
5	241	61.5%	129	32.91%	22	5.61%	392
6	358	63.7%	157	27.94%	47	8.36%	562
7	576	81.8%	114	16.19%	14	1.99%	704
8	467	74.7%	132	21.12%	26	4.16%	625
9	458	87.7%	62	11.88%	2	0.38%	522
10	649	86.1%	93	12.33%	12	1.59%	754
11	495	61.5%	274	34.04%	36	4.47%	805
12	240	63.7%	131	34.75%	6	1.59%	377
13	451	72.7%	148	23.87%	21	3.39%	620
14	372	73.4%	122	24.06%	13	2.56%	507
15	279	75.8%	82	22.28%	7	1.9%	368
16	134	53.4%	107	42.63%	10	3.98%	251
17	488	86.4%	70	12.39%	7	1.24%	565
18	1,094	92.5%	79	6.68%	10	0.85%	1,183
19	598	84.6%	99	14.%	10	1.41%	707
20	257	39.8%	377	58.45%	11	1.71%	645
21	372	58.7%	243	38.33%	19	3.0%	634
22	272	57.5%	179	37.84%	22	4.65%	473
23	138	38.1%	212	58.56%	12	3.31%	362
24	287	55.0%	206	39.46%	29	5.56%	522
25	1,264	84.1%	214	14.24%	25	1.66%	1,503
26	811	69.1%	348	29.64%	15	1.28%	1,174
27	346	60.6%	205	35.9%	20	3.5%	571
28	335	53.9%	273	43.96%	13	2.09%	621
29	239	49.9%	222	46.35%	18	3.76%	479
30	158	36.7%	257	59.77%	15	3.49%	430

== 2021 ==
2021 New Haven mayoral election
- November 2, 2021
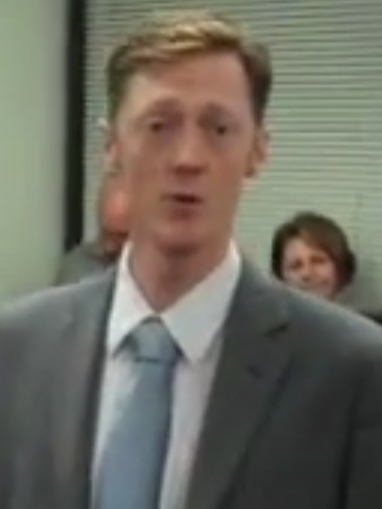

Candidate	Justin Elicker	John Carlson
Party	Democratic	Republican
Popular vote	10,767	1,727
Percentage	85.05%	13.64%
Mayor before election
Justin Elicker
Democratic
Elected mayor
Justin Elicker
Democratic

The 2021 New Haven mayoral election was held on November 2, 2021. Incumbent mayor Justin Elicker won reelection.

=== Democratic primary ===
Justin Elicker was renominated.

In late July, three developments occurred, which left Elicker without an opponent in the primary. Karen DuBois-Walton, the CEO of Elm City Communities (the city's public housing authority), who had been running a campaign for the nomination, withdrew from the race. Mayce Torres, a two-time aldermanic candidate, who was running in the Democratic primary, switched over to the Republican primary. Elena Tej Grewel, who had previously formed an exploratory committee for a prospective run, announced that she would not be running. Before DuBois-Walton's withdrawal, it had been anticipated the primary contest between Ellicker and her would have been competitive.

=== Republican primary ===
In July 2021, Mayce Torres, who had previously been running for the Democratic nomination, announced that she would instead be running for the Republican nomination.

== 2023 ==
2023 New Haven mayoral election
- November 7, 2023
- Turnout: 24.5%
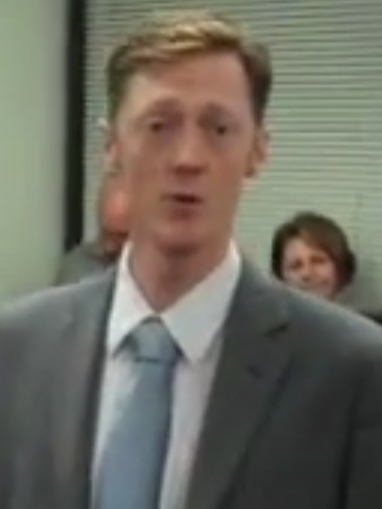

Candidate	Justin Elicker	Tom Goldenberg
Party	Democratic	Republican
Alliance	Working Families	Independent Party
Popular vote	9,755	2,210
Percentage	79.7%	18.1%
Mayor before election
Justin Elicker
Democratic
Elected mayor
Justin Elicker
Democratic

The 2023 New Haven mayoral election was held on November 7, 2023. Incumbent mayor Justin Elicker won re-election to a third term in office, winning nearly 80% of the vote and every ward.

=== Democratic primary ===
The Democratic primary was held on September 12. Incumbent mayor Justin Elicker defeated challenger Liam Brennan, winning all 30 of the city's wards.

==== Declared ====
- Shafiq Abdussabur, former Beaver Hills alderman (failed to qualify for Democratic primary but qualified for general election ballot as an independent)
- Liam Brennan, Hartford Inspector General and former assistant U.S. Attorney
- Justin Elicker, incumbent mayor
- Tom Goldenberg, management consultant (failed to qualify for Democratic primary ballot but received the Republican and Independent Party of Connecticut nominations)

Democratic primary election results
Party	Candidate	Votes	%
Democratic	Justin Elicker (incumbent)	5,503	70.71
Democratic	Liam Brennan	2,280	29.29

=== General election ===
The general election took place on November 7. Incumbent mayor Justin Elicker defeated Republican Tom Goldenberg, winning all 30 of the city's wards. This election was concurrent with a referendum on an amendment to the New Haven Charter, which would extend the terms of the mayor and members of the Board of Alders to four years from two, starting with the 2027 election. The referendum passed by a nearly two-thirds majority.
