= Senator Blackmon =

Senator Blackmon may refer to:

- Allen Blackmon (born 1955), South Carolina State Senate
- Barbara Blackmon (born 1955), Mississippi State Senate
- Bradford Blackmon (born 1988), Mississippi State Senate
- Fred L. Blackmon (1873–1921), Alabama State Senate

== See also ==
- Alfred Blackman (1807–1880), Connecticut State Senate
