= Justin Elicker =

American politician (born 1975)

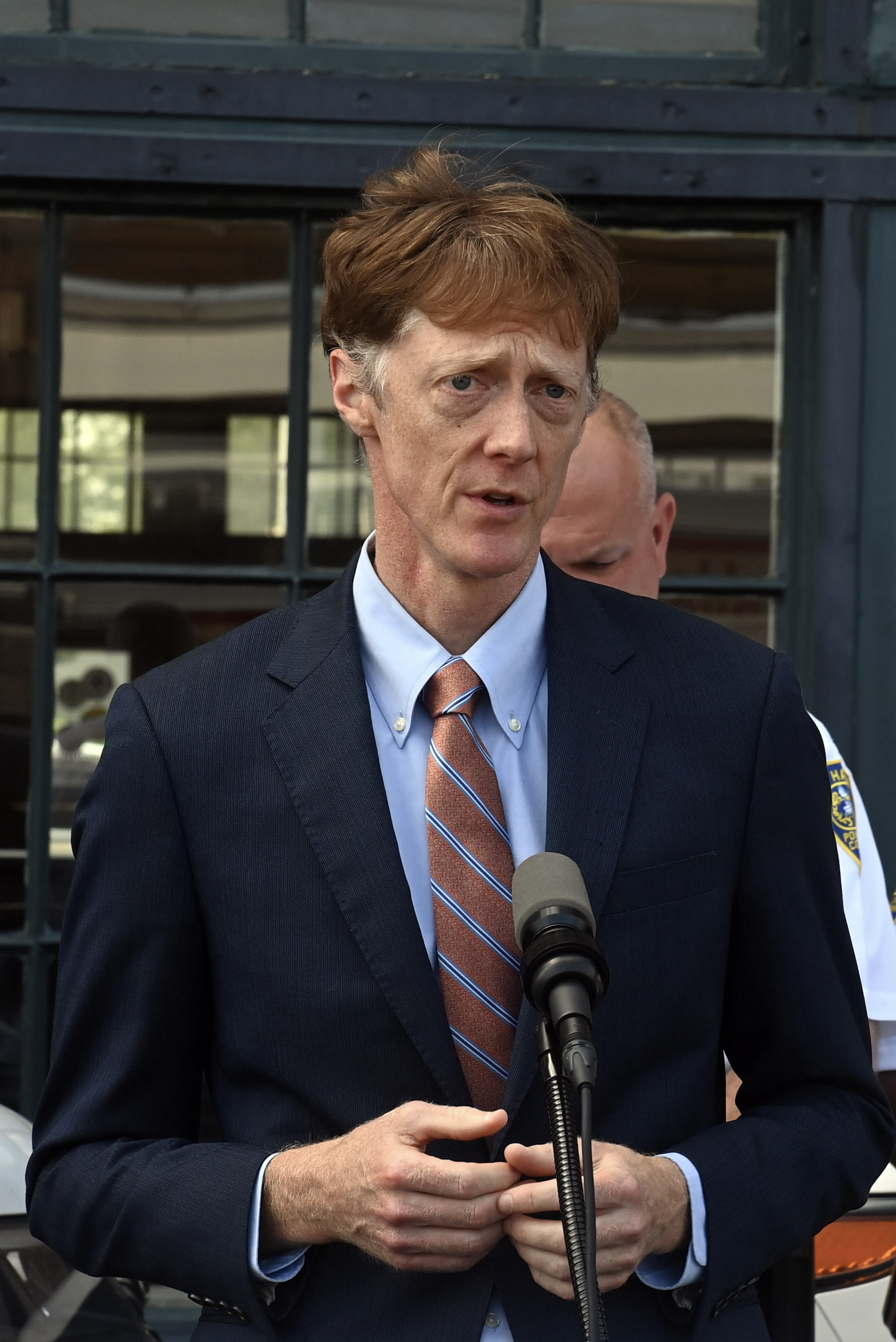

52nd Mayor of New Haven
- Incumbent
- Assumed office January 1, 2020
- Preceded by: Toni Harp

Personal details
- Born: July 31, 1975 (age 51) New York City, New York, U.S.
- Party: Democratic
- Other political affiliations: Working Families
- Spouse: Natalie Elicker
- Children: 2
- Education: Middlebury College, Yale University

Justin Elicker (born July 31, 1975) is an American politician who serves as the 52nd mayor of New Haven, Connecticut. A Democrat currently in his third term, he was previously a city alderman representing East Rock and a diplomat in the United States Foreign Service. He was the first candidate to be elected mayor without the support of the local Democratic Party since Frank Logue in 1975.

== Early life ==
Elicker was born in New York City and raised in New Canaan, Connecticut. He attended Middlebury College as an undergraduate. Elicker worked as an elementary and high school teacher and as a diplomat, spending five years working in Hong Kong, Taiwan, and Washington for the State Department.

He moved to New Haven in 2007 for a dual master's degree in the Yale School of Forestry & Environmental Studies and the Yale School of Management. He quickly became involved in city politics and was elected to an alderman's seat in 2009. After finishing his master's program, he took a job in Yale University's Office of Sustainability.

== Mayor of New Haven ==
=== Campaigns ===
==== 2013 ====
Elicker first ran for mayor at age 38 in 2013, when 20-year incumbent John DeStefano Jr. announced he would not seek another term. Four candidates qualified for the Democratic primary, including state senator Toni Harp, who had won the endorsement of local party officials. Elicker relied on the public campaign financing from the New Haven Democracy Fund to finance his first campaign.

In the primary, Elicker finished a distant second to Harp, receiving 23% of the vote to her 50%. But he gathered enough signatures to run in the general election as an independent. Elicker labeled himself the candidate of integrity and sound government who would not show favoritism in hiring for city jobs. He attacked Harp over her family's real estate business being the largest tax delinquent in Connecticut. Meanwhile, Harp's supporters painted Elicker as a carpetbagger who had only lived in the city for six years.

Harp defeated Elicker in the general election, winning 54.6% of the vote. After his defeat, Elicker was hired as executive director of the New Haven Land Trust, an organization that manages and preserves open land in the city.

==== 2019 ====
In January 2019, Elicker announced he would again challenge Harp, who was seeking her fourth two-year term. He pledged to tackle urban blight, absentee landlords, and growing income inequality. Harp's campaign was impacted by a FBI corruption investigation into elements of city hall, specifically the youth services department. Harp's campaign manager, Edward Corey, accused Elicker's wife Natalie, a federal prosecutor who handled only civil cases, had been "manipulating the FBI" into the investigation, which received pushback. Harp, then 72, had won 17 consecutive elections in the city, between her time in the state senate and as mayor. She again won the endorsement of several local party officials, despite Elicker outraising her. Elicker again relied on public campaign financing from the New Haven Democracy Fund to finance his campaign.

Elicker won the Democratic primary with 58% of the vote. He and Harp each won about half of the city's wards, but turnout was higher in the whiter areas of the city than in Black and Hispanic neighborhoods.

Harp already had a place on the November general election ballot thanks to her endorsement by the Working Families Party, so she had the opportunity for a rematch, just like the one Elicker had pursued in 2013. On September 25, she announced she would suspend her campaign and not actively seek votes in the general. But a month later, she announced she was "unsuspending" her campaign and was "in it to win it." Elicker won the general election with 68% of the vote. He was inaugurated as New Haven's 52nd mayor on January 1, 2020.

=== Tenure ===
As mayor, Elicker negotiated a new deal with Yale University that nearly doubled its annual payments-in-lieu-of-taxes to the city. In the wake of the murder of George Floyd, Elicker launched a new program called COMPASS that created non-police crisis-response teams to citizen issues. He also oversaw passage of a new inclusive zoning bill to require the construction of more affordable housing in the city and pushed for an expansion of Tweed New Haven Airport that attracted Avelo Airlines. During his second term, hackers stole more than $6 million from the city's school system, though $3.6 million was later recovered.

Elicker has been an advocate of surveillance technology, and has overseen the installation of automatic license plate readers (ALPRs), school bus cameras, and traffic cameras throughout New Haven.

Elicker was reelected to office by wide margins in 2021 and 2023.

== Personal life ==
Elicker is married and has two daughters. His wife, Natalie Elicker, is an attorney in the U.S. Justice Department. He speaks Spanish and Chinese.

Political offices
Preceded by Toni Harp	Mayor of the City of New Haven; 2020–	Succeeded by Incumbent
