= Mayor Murphy =

- Thomas J. Murphy, Jr. (born August 15, 1944), mayor of Pittsburgh, Pennsylvania
- John W. Murphy (Connecticut politician), mayor of New Haven, Connecticut
- Brian Murphy (politician), mayor of Moncton, Canada
- Frank Murphy (1890–1949), mayor of Detroit, Michigan
- Dick Murphy (born December 16, 1942), mayor of San Diego, California
- Percy Marunui Murphy, mayor in New Zealand
