= SF City ID Card =

San Francisco authentication method

- Type: municipal identification card
- Issued by: San Francisco, California
- First issued: January 15, 2009
- Purpose: Proof of identity and residency Business discounts Public library card Recreation and Parks Department
- Eligibility: Proof of residency
- Expiration: every 2 years when the cardholder turns 14 losing residency in the city limits

The SF City ID Card is a municipal identification card program operated by San Francisco, California for residents of the city-county, regardless of their immigration status. The cards also do not specify the person's gender, to assist transgender individuals who often have difficulty with identification documents.

The stated purpose of the photo ID card is "to streamline access to City programs and connect residents to local businesses." The program is modeled after a similar program operating in New Haven, Connecticut since 2007.

== Uses ==
According to the SF City ID Card website, users of the card can use it to:

- Serve as proof of identity and residency
- Include information about the card holder's medical conditions or allergies
- List an emergency contact
- Provide discounts on San Francisco family excursions, restaurants, museums, and more
- Be used as a public library card
- Serve as a form of identification to open a checking account at participating banks
- Serve as a form of identification to open a Family Account with the Recreation and Parks Department

== Details and benefits ==
Such cards are not accepted as licenses to drive or purchase alcohol or tobacco, nor are they recognized by federal or state law. Possession of these cards is not considered mandatory by the city government.

Applicants must submit proof of identity and city residency. Parents may obtain a card for a minor; there are separate cards for children 13 and under, and for anyone 14 years of age or older. A fee ranging from $5 to $15 is charged for the card.

Expiration of the card occurs every 2 years, or when the cardholder turns 14 years of age or loses residency in the city limits.

Supervisor Tom Ammiano said the card is a public safety measure, because it will make residents living on the social margins more likely to seek the help of police, as well as giving them more access to banking and other services. The city is bound by law to keep the names and other private information confidential “to the maximum extent permitted by applicable laws” according to the City Attorney's office.

== Background ==
In the early months of 2007 the Immigration and Customs Enforcement, "ICE", conducted dozens of raids in the US, that conducted to the arrest and deportation of hundreds of immigrants, one of the states more affected was California. The Latin American Alliance for Immigrant Rights, ALIADI, a Bay Area-based grassroots organization, founded by Miguel Robles and conformed by local leaders, like Ramon Cardona, Attorney Daniel Luna, Miguel Perez, Julio Garcia, among others, organized a press conference at the San Francisco City Hall, in which they request, that in order to materialize the Sanctuary Status of the city and county of San Francisco, city officials must issue a resident identification card, to improve the interaction between community members (regardless their migratory status), and police officers, as well to allow all San Francisco residents, to access city services and open bank accounts.

ALIADI, started conversations with then Supervisors Chris Daly, Gerardo Sandoval and Tom Ammiano. Supervisor Chris Daly showed interest, but for political reasons couldn't be the sponsor, Gerardo Sandoval was not interested, but his chief of staff, Lupita Peimbert, suggested ALIADI to ask Supervisor Tom Ammiano who showed interest and finally supported the concept. ALIADI gathered over 40 grassroots organizations and non profits, which saw in the City ID Card a tool to improve the life of their clients and members.

After the concept was adopted in San Francisco, ALIADI organized on February 16, 2008, at the Women's Building the first of 3 conferences called "Cities for All; Integrating our communities", this 1st event was attended by over 100 organizers, and was the spark to launch campaigns in support of a city identification cards in Richmond, Santa Clara County, Oakland, Los Angeles, Detroit, Chicago, Minneapolis, among others, where ALIADI has been invited to present their experiences.

== History ==
The ordinance authorizing the County Clerk to issue the ID card was passed by the Board of Supervisors on November 20, 2007. An immigration group, the Washington-based Immigration Reform Law Institute, filed a legal challenge against the law, claiming the program conflicts with federal law, but a judge dismissed the challenge on October 14, 2008. The first cards were issued on January 15, 2009. San Francisco thus became one of a "small but growing number of municipalities" issuing municipal identification cards so that undocumented immigrants will have access to some form of document.

== See also ==
- City identification card
- Elm City Resident Card
