= Dennis Kimberly =

American politician

Dennis Kimberly (October 23, 1790 – December 15, 1862) was an American lawyer and politician.

Kimberly was born October 23, 1790, in what was then a part of New Haven, Connecticut, and is now the town of Orange, Connecticut. He was the youngest of the twelve children of Capt. Silas and Sarah (Smith) Kimberly. He was educated in the school at Litchfield South Farms before attending college.

He graduated from Yale College in 1812. He trained for the law in Springfield with Geo. Bliss, Esq, and in Fairfield, Connecticut with Hon. Roger M Sherman. In March, 1814, he was admitted to the bar in New Haven, where he soon acquired a solid reputation.

In early life he bestowed much time on military affairs, holding finally the rank of Major General in the Connecticut State Militia. Other public offices were thrust upon him.

He was a member of the Connecticut House of Representatives in 1826 through 1829, and 1832 through 1835. In 1831, he was Mayor of New Haven, during which time he led efforts to thwart the establishment of an institution for higher learning for Black children in New Haven. This institution would have been the first of its kind, a historical Black college that predates Cheyney University. Kimberly was reelected in 1833 but declined the honor.

In 1838 he was selected as a Senator of the United States by the Legislature of Connecticut, but declined. He also declined a nomination for Governor of Connecticut at a time when his election was regarded as certain. A few years later, from 1845 to 1848, he was States Attorney for New Haven County, Connecticut.

On account of impaired health, Gen Kimberly, in July, 1852, began a tour in Europe, from which he returned in May, 1854, somewhat better, but he was far from being well during the closing years of his life. He continued to pay some attention to his professional business, and especially to the affairs of the New York and New Haven Railroad, when he was a Director, until a few months before his death in New Haven, December 15, 1862, aged 73 years.

A discourse, commemorative of his life, was preached by Rev. E. L. Cleaveland, D D., and was printed. (New Haven. 22 pp. 8vo.)
