= 2006 Connecticut gubernatorial election =

- November 7, 2006
- Turnout: 59.87% (▲3.36%)
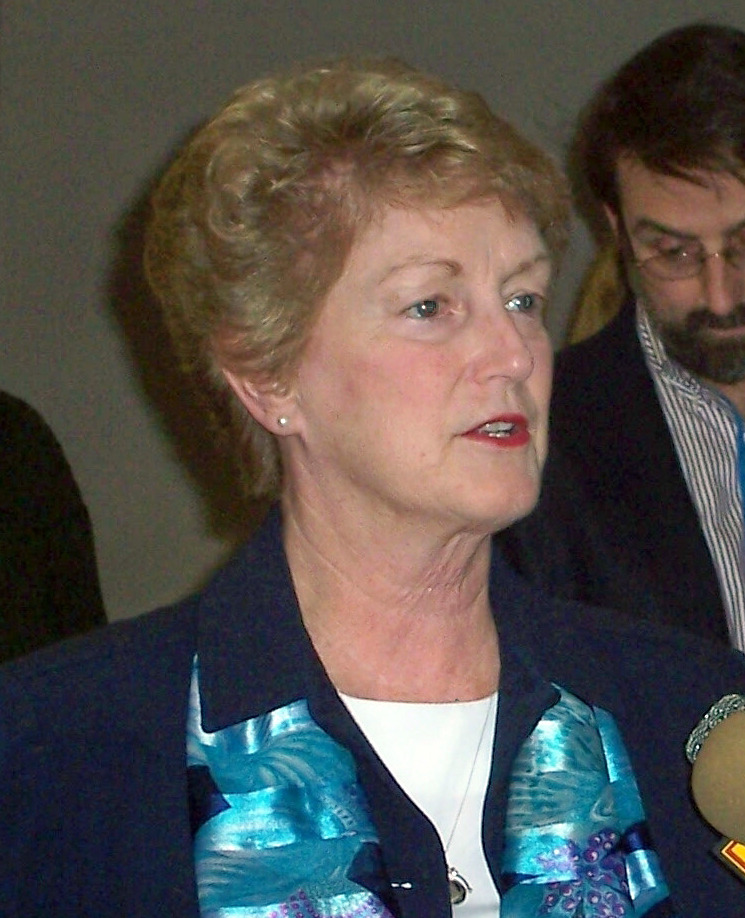

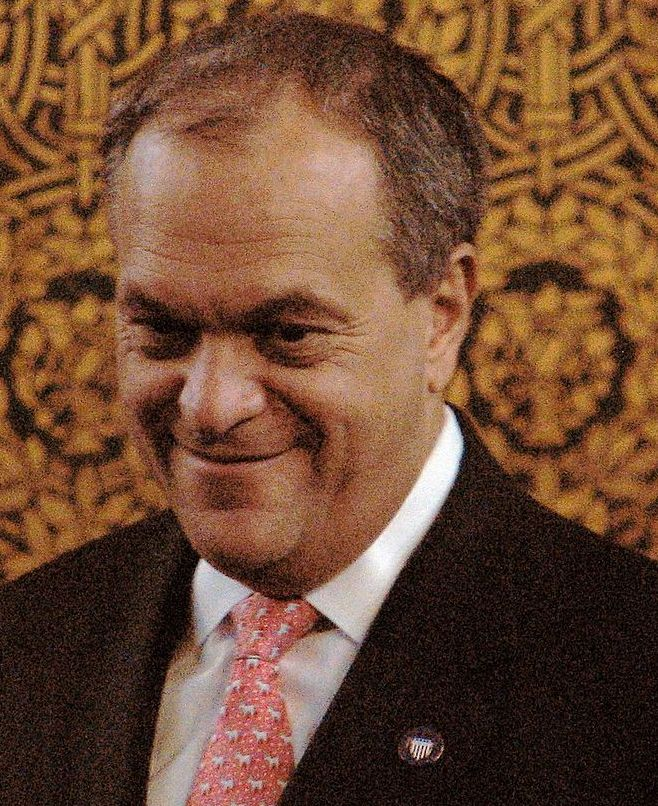
Nominee	Jodi Rell	John DeStefano Jr.
Party	Republican	Democratic
Running mate	Michael Fedele	Mary Glassman
Popular vote	710,048	398,220
Percentage	63.22%	35.45%
- Rell: 50–60% 60–70% 70–80% 80–90% DeStefano: 50–60% 60–70%
Governor before election
Jodi Rell
Republican
Elected Governor
Jodi Rell
Republican

The 2006 Connecticut gubernatorial election occurred on November 7, 2006. Incumbent Republican Jodi Rell became governor when John G. Rowland resigned on corruption charges in 2004. Rell had an approval rating of 70% as of October 19, 2006, and polls showed her leading the Democratic nominee, New Haven mayor John DeStefano by a near 30-point margin. As expected, she won the election to a full term in a landslide. DeStefano defeated Stamford Mayor Dannel Malloy in the Connecticut Democratic gubernatorial primary on August 8. As of 2026, this is the last time a Republican and woman was elected Governor of Connecticut, and the last time any gubernatorial candidate won every county in the state to date.

== Republican primary ==
=== Candidates ===
- Jodi Rell, incumbent governor

- Running mate: Michael Fedele, State Representative

=== Results ===
Governor Rell was unopposed for renomination.

== Democratic primary ==
=== Governor ===
==== Nominee ====
- John DeStefano, Jr., Mayor of New Haven

==== Eliminated in primary ====
- Dannel Malloy, Mayor of Stamford

==== Declined ====
- Richard Blumenthal, Connecticut Attorney General
- Chris Dodd, United States Senator
- Susan Bysiewicz, Connecticut Secretary of State

==== Results ====
===== Convention =====
May 19, 2006 Democratic convention
Party	Candidate	Votes	%
Democratic	Dannel Malloy	799	50.13
Democratic	John DeStefano Jr.	795	49.87

===== Primary =====
Results by county DeStefano: 50–60%; Malloy: 50–60%; 60–70%

Results by municipality DeStefano: 50–60%; 60–70%; Malloy: 50–60%; 60–70%; 70–80%; 80–90%

August 8, 2006 Democratic gubernatorial primary
Party	Candidate	Votes	%
Democratic	John DeStefano Jr.	135,431	50.78
Democratic	Dannel Malloy	131,258	49.22

=== Lieutenant governor ===
==== Nominee ====
- Mary Glassman, former First Selectman of Simsbury (Running mate of Malloy)

==== Eliminated in primary ====
- Scott Slifka, Mayor of West Hartford (Running mate of DeStefano)

==== Results ====
===== Primary =====
Results by municipality Glassman: 50–60%; 60–70%; 70–80%; 80–90%; Slifka: 50–60%; 60–70%; Tie, 50-50%

August 8, 2006 Democratic lieutenant gubernatorial primary
Party	Candidate	Votes	%
Democratic	Mary Glassman	121,943	57.0%
Democratic	Scott Slifka	92,027	43.0%
Total votes		213,970	100.00%

== Independents and third parties ==
=== Green Party ===
- Cliff Thornton, retired businessman; drug policy reform advocate; U.S. Army veteran

=== Concerned Citizens Party ===
- Joseph A. Zdonczyk, retired businessman; U.S. Army veteran; Concerned Citizens Party founder

=== Independent ===
- John M. Joy (write-in candidate)

== General election ==
=== Predictions ===
Source	Ranking	As of
The Cook Political Report	Solid R	November 6, 2006
Sabato's Crystal Ball	Safe R	November 6, 2006
Rothenberg Political Report	Safe R	November 2, 2006
Real Clear Politics	Safe R	November 6, 2006

=== Polling ===
Source	Date	John DeStefano (D)	Jodi Rell (R)
Rasmussen	October 3, 2006	33%	58%
Quinnipiac	August 17, 2006	32%	64%
Rasmussen	August 14, 2006	35%	57%
Rasmussen	July 23, 2006	32%	54%
Quinnipiac	July 20, 2006	25%	62%
Rasmussen	June 19, 2006	31%	59%
Quinnipiac	June 8, 2006	24%	64%
Quinnipiac	May 2, 2006	20%	66%
Quinnipiac	February 16, 2006	16%	70%
Quinnipiac	January 12, 2006	21%	64%
Quinnipiac	July 27, 2005	22%	61%
Quinnipiac	April 6, 2005	19%	66%
Quinnipiac	November 23, 2004	22%	59%

=== Results ===
The following are the results of the 2006 election: Rell won every county and all but seven towns. Notably, DeStefano won the capital city of Hartford, the largest city of Bridgeport, and his hometown of New Haven.

2006 Connecticut gubernatorial election
Party	Candidate	Votes	%	±%
Republican	Jodi Rell (incumbent)	710,048	63.22%	+7.11
Democratic	John DeStefano Jr.	398,220	35.45%	−8.44
Green	Cliff Thornton	9,584	0.85%	n/a
Concerned Citizens	Joseph A. Zdonczyk	5,560	0.49%	n/a
Write-in		54	0.00%	n/a
Total votes		1,123,212	100.0	n/a
Republican hold				

==== By county ====
County	Jodi Rell Republican		John DeStefano Democratic		Various candidates Other parties		Margin		Total votes cast
County	#	%	#	%	#	%	#	%	Total votes cast
Fairfield	185,037	68.7%	81,676	30.3%	2,582	0.9%	103,361	38.5%	269,295
Hartford	165,660	58.2%	114,824	40.4%	4,009	1.4%	50,836	17.8%	284,493
Litchfield	49,368	69.8%	20,358	28.8%	1,039	1.4%	29,010	41.0%	70,765
Middlesex	39,509	61.5%	23,783	37.0%	918	1.5%	15,726	24.5%	64,210
New Haven	161,350	62.4%	92,822	36.3%	3,518	1.4%	67,528	26.1%	258,690
New London	54,469	62.3%	31,623	36.2%	1,325	1.5%	22,846	26.1%	87,417
Tolland	33,648	62.6%	19,172	35.6%	972	1.8%	14,476	27.0%	53,792
Windham	21,007	60.4%	12,962	37.2%	835	2.4%	8,045	23.2%	34,804
Totals	710,048	63.2%	398,220	35.4%	15,144	1.3%	311,828	27.8%	1,123,412

Counties that flipped from Democratic to Republican

- Windham (largest town: Windham)

==== By congressional district ====
Rell won all five congressional districts, including four that elected Democrats.

District	Rell	DeStefano Jr.	Representative
1st	58%	41%	John B. Larson
2nd	63%	35%	Rob Simmons (109th Congress)
2nd	63%	35%	Joe Courtney (110th Congress)
3rd	61%	37%	Rosa DeLauro
4th	67%	32%	Christopher Shays
5th	67%	32%	Nancy L. Johnson (109th Congress)
5th	67%	32%	Chris Murphy (110th Congress)

== See also ==
- U.S. gubernatorial elections, 2006
- State of Connecticut
- Governors of Connecticut
- Dan Malloy
