= Long Wharf, New Haven =

Neighborhood in New Haven, Connecticut

Coordinates: 41.295°N 72.922°W

Long Wharf is a waterfront district and neighborhood of the city of New Haven, Connecticut, United States. The neighborhood is a mixed-use district, with a combination of commercial, industrial, port, and recreation facilities.

== Location ==
Long Wharf stretches inland from the west side of New Haven Harbor northwest to Union Avenue, west to Hallock Avenue and Cedar Street, and north to the Oak Street Connector and I-95 (up to the Q-Bridge). It is located east of The Hill, and south of downtown New Haven and the Wooster Square neighborhood. Interstate 95 bisects the neighborhood from the southwest to northeast; it intersects with Interstate 91 in the extreme northeast section of the neighborhood. The Oak Street Connector/Route 34 also connects with Interstate 95 in the selfsame section.

== History ==
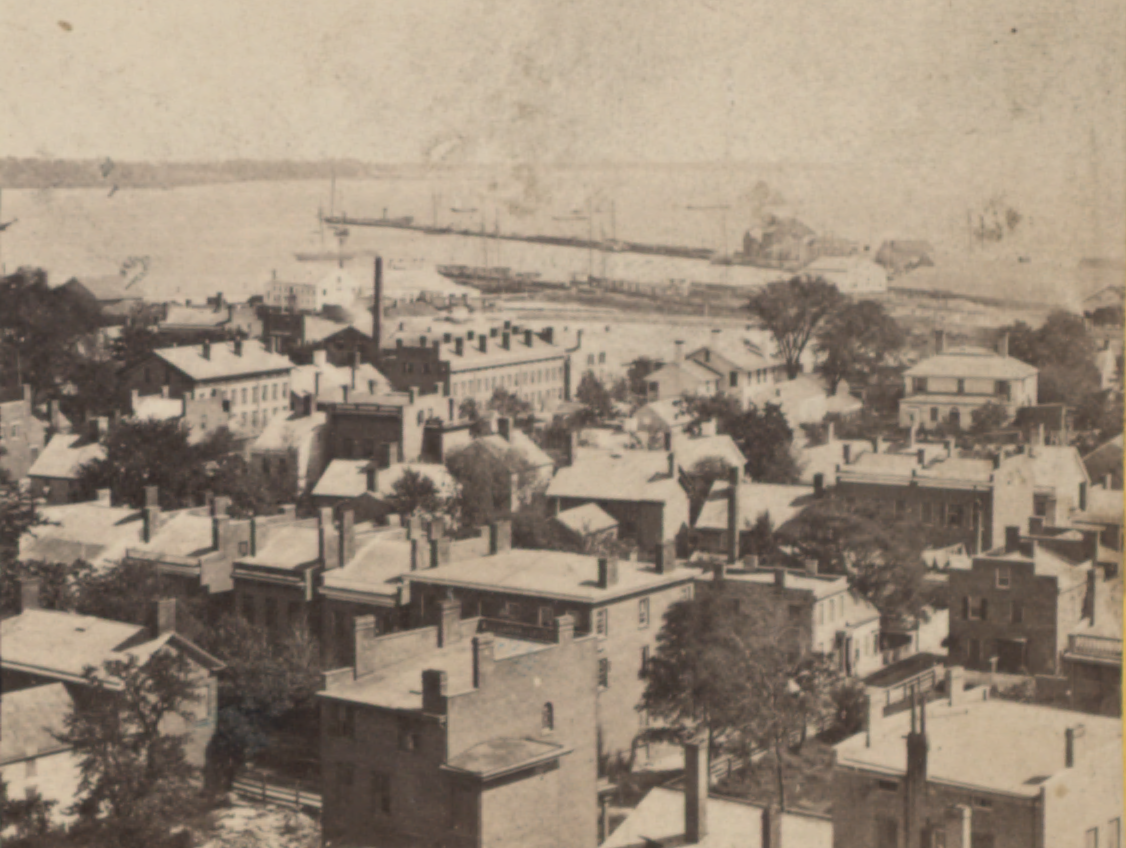
New Haven's harbor and long wharf as seen from Depot Tower, c. 1849

The area is called "Long Wharf" because there was once a wharf there that projected out of the juncture of Water Street and Union Avenue The wharf was built by William Lanson, an African American entrepreneur and engineer. He built the wharf into New Haven Harbor until it finally reached a length of 3/4 of a mile, making it the longest wharf in the country. Along it stood the Customs House, warehouses and other businesses. It was destroyed in the late 1940s to early 1950s when the harbor was partially filled in to construct Interstate Highways 91 and 95, dramatically moving the waterfront and creating this district.

== Buildings and features ==
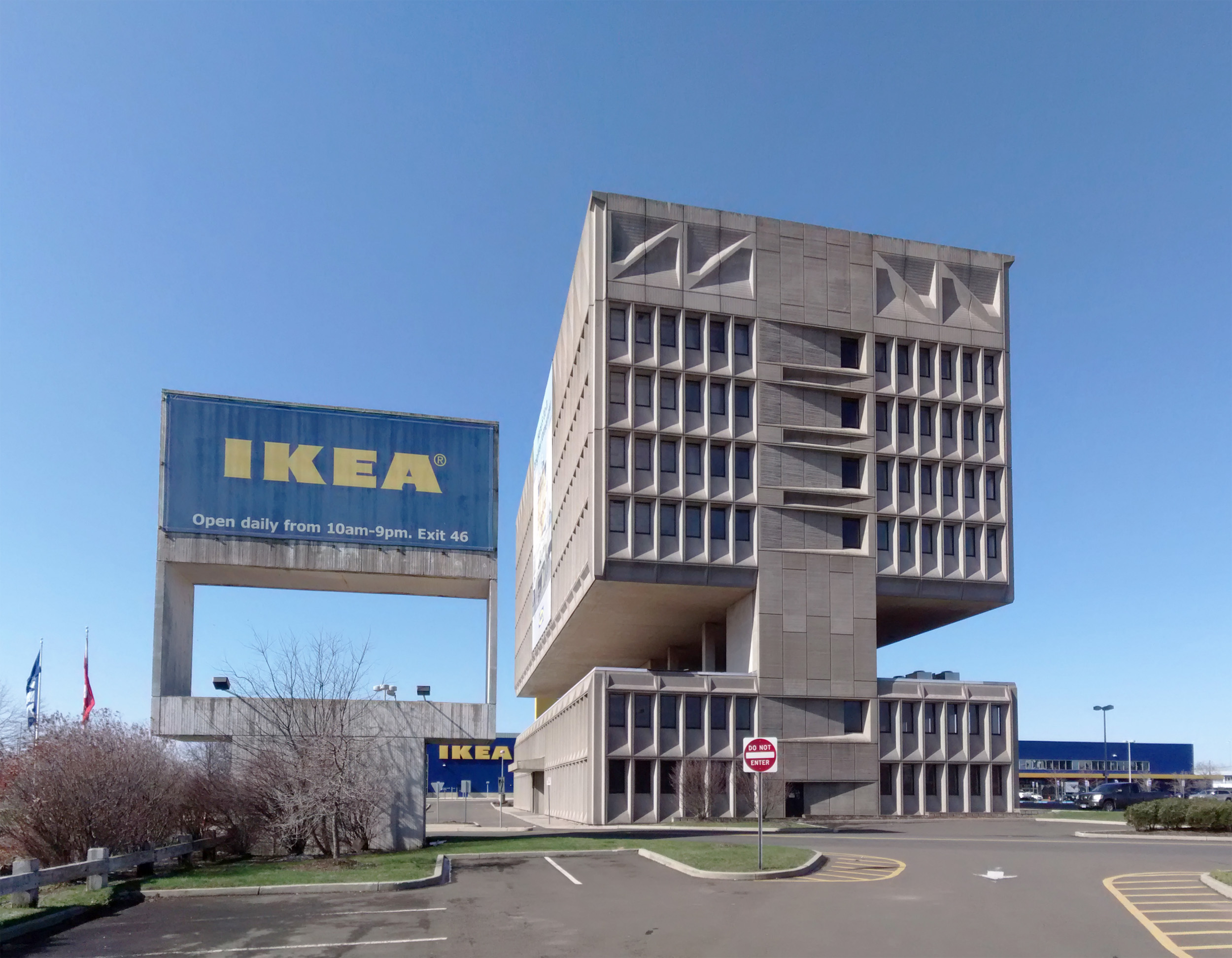
The remaining portion of the Pirelli Tire Building

The Long Wharf area contains several notable features and buildings, including the Long Wharf Theatre, the Long Wharf Maritime Center, Sargent (a New Haven firm with a history going back to 1810, now a division of Assa Abloy), the former headquarters of the New Haven Register (Jordan's Furniture as of 2016), as well as New Haven's Vietnam Veterans Memorial Park which stretches for seventeen acres (69,000 m^{2}) directly along the harborfront. Long Wharf is also the home port of a replica of the historical ship Amistad.

The area also includes the remaining portion of Marcel Breuer's landmark Pirelli Tire Building (1969), now the Hotel Marcel. The building was truncated in 2003 to accommodate the construction of the new IKEA home products store. IKEA originally proposed to destroy the entire building but compromised after a lengthy public debate. The tower was preserved but the rear portion was razed to make room for the IKEA parking lot. Ironically, IKEA's furniture styling is strongly influenced by the famed Bauhaus school where Breuer taught. It was once planned that a large shopping mall, the New Haven Galleria, would be constructed at this location; instead the IKEA store was built.

== Church Street Bridge ==
Road construction has been encouraged to reconnect this neighborhood directly with downtown. The Church Street Bridge was built for this purpose and opened in December 2003. It provided a new link from downtown to Long Wharf for vehicles, pedestrians and bicyclists. Constructing the bridge was difficult due to its placement over a broad active rail yard. In order to minimize disruption, particularly to the trains which run underneath it, the bridge was completed in a single-night operation (called the "Big Pick") using the largest land-based, mobile, high-capacity crane in existence. This mega-crane with a 2600-ton capacity was delivered in over 200 tractor-trailer loads and put in place the preassembled 320-foot (98 m) steel truss center span.

== Neighborhood issues ==
Long Wharf Drive has attracted drag racers from all over the state. On August 17, 2008, Misael Ruiz, of East Haven, was killed by a racing car that lost control. Town officials are now making decisions on how to prevent racing on the strip.
