= Connecticut's 10th State Senate district =

American legislative district

Senator
| Gary Winfield; D |

Connecticut's 10th State Senate district elects one member of the Connecticut State Senate. It consists of the cities of New Haven and West Haven. It is currently represented by Democrat Gary Winfield, who has been serving since 2014.

== Recent elections ==
=== 2020 ===
2020 Connecticut State Senate election, District 10
| Party | Candidate | Votes | % |
|---|---|---|---|
| Democratic | Gary Winfield (incumbent) | 23,237 | 78.14 |
| Republican | Carlos M. Alvarado | 4,081 | 13.72 |
| Working Families | Gary Winfield (incumbent) | 1,509 | 2.81 |
| Petitioning candidate | Jason W. Bartlett | 1,246 | 4.19 |
| Total votes | | 30,073 | 100.00 |
| Democratic hold | | | |

=== 2018 ===
2018 Connecticut State Senate election, District 10
| Party | Candidate | Votes | % |
|---|---|---|---|
| Total | Gary Winfield (incumbent) | 20,182 | 88.0 |
| Democratic | Gary Winfield | 19,284 | 84.1 |
| Working Families | Gary Winfield | 898 | 3.9 |
| Republican | Douglas Losty | 2,745 | 12.0 |
| Total votes | | 22,927 | 100.0 |
| Democratic hold | | | |

=== 2016 ===
2016 Connecticut State Senate election, District 10
| Party | Candidate | Votes | % |
|---|---|---|---|
| Democratic | Gary Winfield | 26,153 | 100.0 |
| Total votes | | 26,153 | 100.0 |
| Democratic hold | | | |

=== 2014 ===
2014 Connecticut State Senate election, District 10
| Party | Candidate | Votes | % |
|---|---|---|---|
| Democratic | Gary Winfield | 16,615 | 100.0 |
| Total votes | | 16,615 | 100.0 |
| Democratic hold | | | |

=== 2014 special ===
2014 Special State Senate election, District 10
| Party | Candidate | Votes | % |
|---|---|---|---|
| Democratic | Gary Winfield (incumbent) | 3,236 | 75.6 |
| Republican | Steven Mullins | 1,045 | 24.4 |
| Total votes | | 4,281 | 100.00 |
| Democratic hold | | | |

=== 2012 ===
2012 Connecticut State Senate election, District 10
| Party | Candidate | Votes | % |
|---|---|---|---|
| Democratic | Toni Harp | 27,121 | 100.0 |
| Total votes | | 27,121 | 100.0 |
| Democratic hold | | | |
