= Elm City Resident Card =

- Type: Municipal identification card
- Issued by: New Haven, Connecticut
- First issued: July 24, 2007
- Purpose: Proof of identity and residency debit card with a capacity of $150 library card means for paying parking meters
- Eligibility: Two different proofs of New Haven residency
- Expiration: Losing residency in the city limits

The Elm City Resident Card is an identification (ID) card used in New Haven, Connecticut in the United States. The card was originally designed to protect the estimated 10,000 to 15,000 illegal immigrants in New Haven from being robbed or assaulted. All city residents can receive the card, which serves as a form of identification, debit card with a capacity of $150, library card, and a way to pay for parking meters. The cards were first issued in July 2007, and were the first municipal identification cards issued in the United States. The card costs $5 for children or $10 for adults.

== Background ==
Illegal immigration, especially from Mexico and other Latin American countries, has been a controversial political issue in the US for many years.

Undocumented immigrants in New Haven were often targets of robbery, and sometimes murder because they were less likely to go to police due to their immigration status. It is also harder for undocumented immigrants to get bank accounts, causing some to carry around larger sums of cash.

New Haven has historically had a favorable policy toward immigrants. In December 2006, the New Haven police instituted a policy of not asking crime victims or witnesses about their immigration status, unless they were suspected of being involved in a crime - the first policy of its kind in Connecticut.

== Planning ==
Municipal ID cards were first proposed in 2005, as the result of a study conducted by Unidad Latina en Accion (ULA) a New Haven-based grassroots social justice organization. ULA is a leading member of the Connecticut Immigrant Rights Alliance, a statewide coalition including immigrant, faith, labor, civil rights and human service organizations. Junta for Progressive Action, an advocacy group, and Yale Law School students. The proposal received a positive reaction, but was not adopted. Then, in December 2006, the mayor of New Haven, John DeStefano, Jr., announced that he was reviving the plan. The city then redrafted plans, and in May 2007 unveiled the new Elm City Resident Card that has multiple uses, so that it would be useful to all residents of New Haven.

== Approval ==
On 4 June 2007, New Haven aldermen voted 25-1 in favor of accepting $250,359 in private funds from the First City Fund Corporation to fund the Elm City Resident Card.

== Aftermath ==
=== Immigration raid ===
Two days after the card was unveiled in 2007, Immigration and Customs Enforcement agents arrested 32 illegal immigrants in the city.

=== Immigration office raid ===
In December 2007, 6 months after the plan was approved, federal agents from the Department of Health and Human Services raided the offices of the Community Action Agency of New Haven with a warrant for all documents from 2003 onward. The agents asked whether they had been given instructions about giving aid to illegal immigrants.

=== Other municipal ID cards ===
On January 15, 2009, the city/county of San Francisco launched the SF City ID Card, a municipal identification card program modeled after New Haven's. New York canceled a plan to issue driver's licenses for illegal immigrants after strong opposition.

== Opposition ==
Just before the ID cards were approved, two groups - Danbury-based Citizens for Immigration Control and the North Branford-based Southern Connecticut Citizens for Immigration Reform - wrote and distributed flyers around New Haven criticizing the Card. The Southern Connecticut Citizens for Immigration Reform have also criticized the plan as hurting New Haven's workers who are legal residents.

Other critics argue that it will entice illegal immigration and undermine border security.

In early 2008, opponents filed a Freedom of Information request to make public the names, addresses and photos of everyone who has an ID card. On June 25, 2008, Connecticut's Freedom of Information Commission upheld the city's decision to reject this request and protect the privacy and safety of holders of the Elm City ID.
