= Frank Logue =

Mayor of New Haven, Connecticut

Mayor of New Haven, Connecticut
- In office January 1, 1976 – 1979
- Preceded by: Bartholomew F. Guida
- Succeeded by: Biagio DiLieto

Personal details
- Born: August 18, 1924
- Died: December 31, 2010 (aged 86)
- Party: Democratic

Frank Logue (August 18, 1924 – December 31, 2010) was the 47th mayor of New Haven, Connecticut, serving from 1976 to 1979.

== Family and early life ==
His mother was widowed, leaving her to support five children during the Great Depression on a kindergarten teacher's salary. Frank Logue and his three brothers all attended Yale University, where, after Pearl Harbor, they enlisted in the military reserves. Logue was called to active duty in 1943, served as an infantry soldier in France, and returned to Yale, graduating in 1948, and going on to attend Yale Law School.

In 1947, Logue served as President of the Yale Political Union. His older brother Edward, a Yale Law School graduate who married the daughter of William DeVane, dean of Yale College, was an influential city planner who was Mayor Richard C. Lee's right-hand man on most administrative matters and later ran for mayor of Boston.

== Political career ==
Logue entered politics in Trumbull, Connecticut, in 1953, becoming a Democratic district leader, then a prosecutor, and then town attorney. He ran for state representative in 1960, and lost. He served in the Kennedy administration as a part-time staff person for the U.S. Commission on Civil Rights.

At age 40 he moved his family to New Haven, where he organized and directed an institute to train community organizers and neighborhood workers in the War on Poverty. He later created and directed "National Urban Fellows", an urban leadership development program for minorities and women. He was subsequently elected to the New Haven Board of Aldermen, representing the city's 18th Ward for two two-year terms, from 1972 to 1975.

Bucking the New Haven Democratic party machine, he ran as a liberal reform candidate against the party's candidate, incumbent Bart Guida, in the 1975 mayoral primary and went on to win the primary and the general election. He took office as mayor on January 1, 1976.

Logue ran as the standard bearer of liberal reformers looking to topple the party machine overseen by Guida's patron, the late party Chairman Arthur Barbieri. It was a heady campaign; key workers included future congresswoman Rosa DeLauro; her husband, presidential adviser Stan Greenberg; and state judge Thayer Baldwin.

Once in office, Logue had the luck of presiding over the city during a period of national urban decline. Employers, retailers, and middle-class families finished a suburban exodus from New Haven that began during the heady "Model City" urban renewal period that saw a record amount of federal and foundation dollars pour into the city, only to leave it poorer. In the late 1970s, much of downtown was boarded up and a general malaise had settled over the city.

Logue was an early advocate of historic preservation, an antidote to the destruction of so much of the city's landscape during urban renewal. Logue also believed the arts could help revitalize the city. He came up with the original idea of reviving the Shubert theater as part of a downtown arts renaissance, an idea his successor put into action along with an emphasis on preservation. Logue started the process of reviving downtown with the rehabilitation of the old Taft Hotel.

He helped push the state to create the PILOT (payments in lieu of taxes) program for cities, in which Connecticut partially reimbursed cities for lost property tax revenues from non-profits.

He won renomination in the September 1977 primary by a margin of 243 votes over challenger Biagio DiLieto and was re-elected to a second term in November of that year. However, he lost the primary to DiLieto in his bid for a third two-year term in 1979.

== Post career ==
After leaving the mayor's office, Logue was an active civic volunteer in New Haven and worked as a labor arbitrator and as a consultant to organizations including the Ford Foundation. He died in Hamden, Connecticut, on December 31, 2010.

Preceded by Bartholomew F. Guida	Mayor of New Haven, Connecticut; 1976–1979	Succeeded by Biagio DiLieto
