= Richard C. Lee =

American politician (1916–2003)

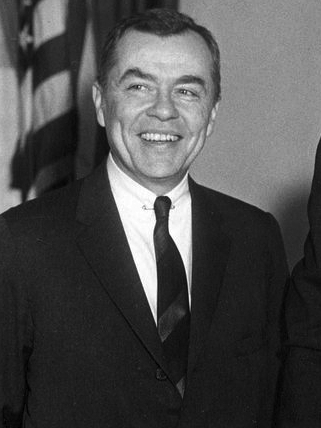
- Lee in 1961

Mayor of New Haven, Connecticut
- In office 1954–1970
- Preceded by: William C. Celentano
- Succeeded by: Bartholomew F. Guida

20th President of the United States Conference of Mayors
- In office 1962–1963
- Preceded by: Anthony J. Celebrezze
- Succeeded by: Arthur L. Selland

Personal details
- Born: March 12, 1916
- Died: February 2, 2003 (aged 86)
- Party: Democratic

Richard Charles Lee (March 12, 1916 – February 2, 2003) (sometimes called "Mr. Urban America") was an American politician who served as the mayor of New Haven from 1954 until 1970. He was a Democrat and was the youngest mayor the city had ever had at the time he entered office in 1954 at the age of 37. Lee is best known for his leading role in urban redevelopment in the 1950s and 1960s.

== Early life ==
Richard Charles Lee was born on March 12, 1916. He grew up in a cold-water apartment in the working-class Newhallville neighborhood of New Haven. His father, Frederick, worked at the Winchester Repeating Arms Company. He graduated from Hillhouse High School in 1934.

== Career ==
After being defeated for mayor in 1949 and 1951, he won in 1953. Lee appointed the city's first black corporation counsel, George Williamson Crawford, in 1954.

During his first re-election campaign in 1957, John F. Kennedy, then a member of the United States Senate, traveled to New Haven to campaign for him. To shore up New Haven's large Italian-American electorate, the mayor brought in Rocky Marciano, the boxer. He won that election by a 2-to-1 margin.

Lee went on to serve 16 years as mayor, second-longest of New Haven's mayors at the time. In 2003, he died at the age of 86.

In 1962 and 1963, Lee served as the president of the United States Conference of Mayors.

== Legacy ==
On May 17, 1999, Congresswoman Rosa DeLauro (D-CT) dedicated the Richard C. Lee United States Courthouse in downtown New Haven to Lee. DeLauro worked with Senators Christopher Dodd and Joseph Lieberman to rename the federal building, which stands at 141 Church Street. The Richard C. Lee Highway, a freeway in downtown New Haven, is also named in his honor.

A former New Haven public high school, carried the name Richard C. Lee High School in his honor; it has been replaced by Career Magnet High School. The Richard C. Lee High School building became the Yale School of Nursing and now houses a variety of Yale Medical School offices.

Political offices
Preceded by William C. Celentano	Mayors of New Haven, Connecticut; 1954 — 1970	Succeeded by Bartholomew F. Guida
