= John DeStefano Jr. =

American mayor (born 1955)

John DeStefano
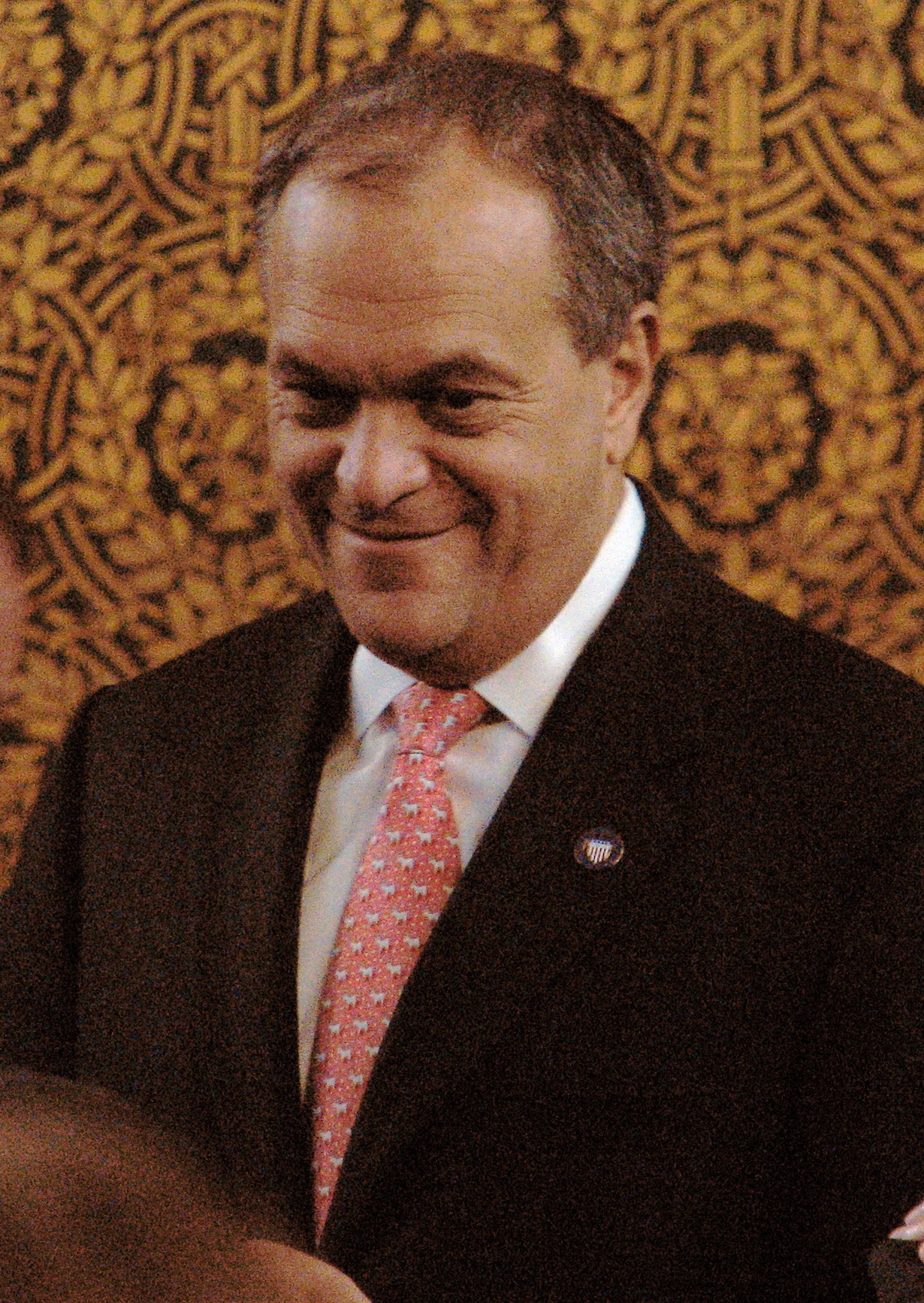

50th Mayor of New Haven
- In office January 6, 1994 – January 1, 2014
- Preceded by: John Daniels
- Succeeded by: Toni Harp

77th President of the National League of Cities
- In office 2003
- Preceded by: Karen J. Anderson
- Succeeded by: Charles H. Lyons

Personal details
- Born: May 11, 1955 (age 71) New Haven, Connecticut, U.S.
- Party: Democratic
- Spouse: Kathy DeStefano
- Children: 2
- Education: University of Connecticut, Storrs (BS, MA)

John DeStefano Jr. (born May 11, 1955) is an American politician who served as the 49th mayor of New Haven, Connecticut, from 1994 until 2014. He was the Democratic nominee in 2006 for governor of Connecticut, unsuccessfully challenging incumbent Republican Governor M. Jodi Rell. He was also the named defendant in the landmark 2009 U.S. Supreme Court case of Ricci v. DeStefano. DeStefano is the son of a New Haven police officer. DeStefano and his wife Kathy met at the University of Connecticut as undergraduates, where he also earned a Masters in Public Administration. Kathy DeStefano is a first-grade teacher in West Haven, Connecticut, and they are the parents of two adult sons.

== Career ==
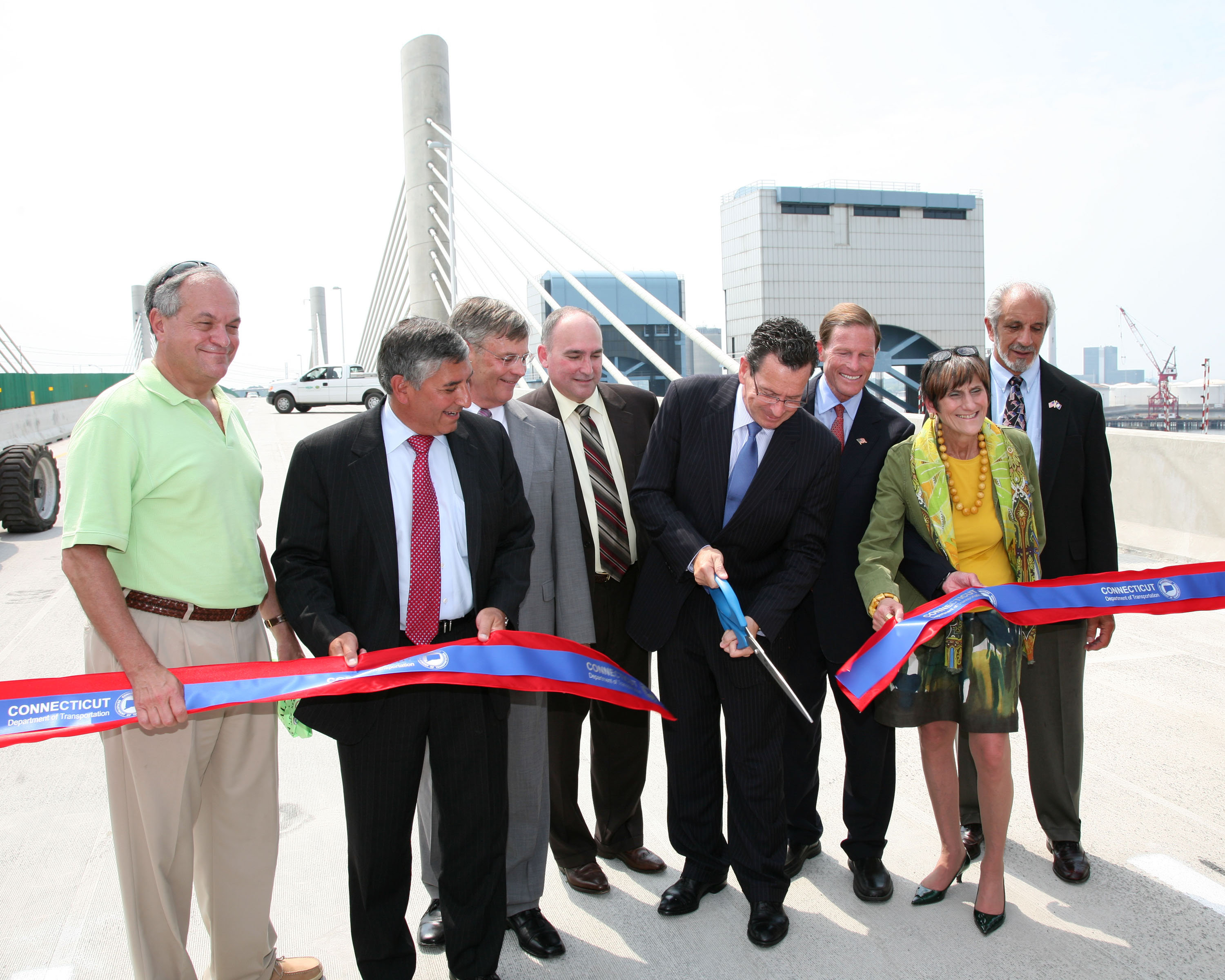
DeStefano (far left) joins other officials, including Governor Dannel Malloy, Senator Richard Blumenthal, Congresswoman Rosa DeLauro, at the ribbon-cutting ceremony for the northbound span of the new Pearl Harbor Memorial Bridge on June 22, 2012

A high-level aide under Mayor Biagio DiLieto, DeStefano first ran for the mayor's office in 1989, after DiLieto announced he would not seek re-election. DeStefano won the endorsement of the New Haven Democratic Party, but was defeated in a Democratic primary by John Daniels.

DeStefano successfully ran again in 1993. He served ten consecutive terms, (posting his tenth mayoral election victory in November 2011) during which his efforts included a massive overhaul of New Haven's public schools, based principally on the magnet school model, and New Haven's selection as a federal "Empowerment Zone". DeStefano was New Haven's longest-serving mayor; after 10 terms in office, he announced that he would not seek an 11th term. DeStefano was a member of the Mayors Against Illegal Guns Coalition, an organization formed in 2006 and co-chaired by New York City mayor Michael Bloomberg and Boston mayor Thomas Menino. He had to deal with public perceptions that violent crime was on the rise in New Haven.

DeStefano closed the aging New Haven Coliseum in 2002, and started demolition on it three years later (finishing the demolition in 2007).

In 2006 DeStefano ran for governor. On August 8, 2006, DeStefano defeated Stamford mayor Dannel Malloy in the Democratic primary, with Mary Messina Glassman as his running mate. DeStefano and Glassman were defeated by the very popular incumbent governor Jodi Rell and her running mate Michael Fedele in the general election by one of the largest majorities in state history and conceded that night.

Following his defeat by Rell, DeStefano focused his attention on a controversial plan to issue official city ID cards to city residents, including undocumented immigrants. Proponents called the cards a way for undocumented aliens to gain access to city services and bank accounts (reducing undocumented immigrants' potential to avoid bank fees and interest, while also providing that they don't have to hold large amounts of cash, which made them and people who looked to criminals like undocumented immigrants targets for theft), while critics considered the cards an encouragement to illegal immigration. Proponents pointed out that the undocumented immigrants are already living in the city, and are the responsibility of the federal government, and that these cards would serve to bring people out of the shadows and under a small degree of government supervision. The city began issuing the cards, dubbed the "Elm City Resident Card", on July 24, 2007.

DeStefano focused his tenure as mayor on improving education and public safety in New Haven, as well as on economic development. Notable initiatives included the Livable City Initiative, begun in 1996, which promoted homeownership and removed blight, and the Citywide Youth Initiative. In 1995, DeStefano launched a 15-year, $1.5 billion School Construction Program, already half finished, to replace or renovate every New Haven public school. DeStefano was President of the Connecticut Conference of Municipalities, and in 2003 was President of the National League of Cities.

In 2008, DeStefano announced massive budget cuts to balance the city's $456 million budget, including the potential closures of an elementary school, police substations, and senior centers.

In 2009, the U.S. Supreme Court ruled against DeStefano in the discrimination case of Ricci v. DeStefano. The city had been under a court order to promote 20 firefighters, 19 white and one Hispanic, who had been denied promotions on the basis that the civil service test they took had been biased. Justice Samuel Alito's concurring opinion suggested that DeStefano had been motivated by improper political considerations in denying the promotions.

DeStefano currently teaches an undergraduate seminar, entitled "Making Public Choices in New Haven", at Yale University.

== See also ==
- 2006 Connecticut gubernatorial election

Political offices
Preceded by John Daniels	Mayor of New Haven; 1994–2014	Succeeded by Toni Harp
Party political offices
Preceded by Bill Curry	Democratic nominee for Governor of Connecticut; 2006	Succeeded by Dan Malloy
