= Alfred Blackman =

American politician and judge (1807–1880)

- Born: December 28, 1807; Newtown, Connecticut, U.S.
- Died: April 28, 1880 (aged 72); New Haven, Connecticut, U.S.
- Education: Yale College
- Occupations: Politician, judge
- Known for: Connecticut State Senate, Judge, Court of Common Pleas, Mayor, New Haven, Connecticut
- Spouse: Abbie Beers (m. 1832)
- Children: 2

Alfred Francis Blackman (December 28, 1807 – April 28, 1880) was an American politician and judge.

== Biography ==
Blackman was born in Newtown, Connecticut, on December 28, 1807. He graduated from Yale College in 1828. Immediately after graduation he began the study of law in the office of his father, Judge of Probate for the district, and in 1830 he was admitted to the bar. In 1832 he removed to the village of Humphreysville, now the town of Seymour, Connecticut, and practiced there until 1842, when he moved to Waterbury, Connecticut, to perform the duties of Judge of Probate. In the fall of 1844 he transferred his residence to New Haven, where he remained until his death.

In 1842 he was elected to the Connecticut State Senate, and in 1851 was appointed Judge of the Court of Common Pleas, then known as the County Court, which office he consented to hold only for a single year. In 1852 he was appointed Clerk of the U. S. District Court, which position he held until 1868. In 1855 he was elected a representative to the Connecticut General Assembly. While there, he was elected Mayor of the City; he held the office for one year, declining a re-nomination. He remained in practice until 1869, when owing to the decline of his health he retired from active life. He died in New Haven, on April 28, 1880, in his 73rd year, after a long illness.

He married Abbie Beers of Newtown in 1832, who survived him. Their two sons graduated from Yale; only the younger survived him.
