= City identification card =

Identification card issued by a US municipality

In the United States, a city (or municipal) identification card, also described in some jurisdictions as an enhanced library card, is a form of identification card issued by a municipality or municipal-level agency, rather than a state or federal government. Under federal law, cities may issue their own identification cards as they see fit, and do not have to consider the immigration or criminal status of an applicant before doing so. New Haven, Connecticut, issued the first municipal identification cards in the United States, the Elm City Resident Card, in 2007. On January 15, 2009, the city/county of San Francisco launched the SF City ID Card, a municipal identification card program modeled after New Haven's. Other cities that issue identification cards include Asbury Park, New Jersey, and Washington, D.C. (DC One Card). In Mercer County, New Jersey, a community ID card is being issued by a local non-profit organization with the endorsement of various law enforcement agencies.

Several Texas cities' library systems including those of have issued "enhanced library cards", or library cards which contain a photo and personal identification information.

== Benefits ==
Among the benefits and features often added to municipal ID cards are the following:

- photo identification
- documentation of vital statistics, including birth date, residential address,
- emergency contact information
- access to medical services
- identifications in schools
- law enforcement recognition
- library services, often supplementary to or replacing standard library cards
- access to public transit services
- assist in opening local bank accounts
- access to other municipal services, amenities and facilities
- access to the above for those residents who are unable to obtain a driver's license or state ID, often those who are unable to legally drive or are homeless

Municipal ID cards are not intended to replace driver's licenses or state ID cards, and are often not accepted as a valid form of Voter identification.

== List by jurisdiction ==
=== Arizona ===
==== Phoenix, Arizona (approved, then cancelled) ====
On August 31, 2016, the city council of Phoenix, Arizona voted 5 to 4 to create a city identification card that would be available to undocumented immigrants. The cards were to have been available by February 2017. This program was cancelled in February 2018.

=== Arkansas ===
==== Little Rock (2018) ====
Little Rock offers the Little Rock Identification Card to residents 14 years of age and older. When it launched in 2018, the city claims, it was "the first of its kind in the southern region of the United States". As of 2023, the city issues approximately 1,500 cards per year.

=== California ===
==== Los Angeles, California (not issued as of 2019) ====
On November 8, 2012, the Los Angeles City Council voted 12 to 1 to solicit proposals for a municipal identification card. It will be modeled on the Oakland City ID system.

==== Oakland, California (2013) ====
The city of Oakland, California, has a municipal identification system, which, unusually, initially included a debit card function, for all city residents, regardless of immigration status, a move backed by the Oakland City ID Card Coalition. Unusually, the Oakland City ID initially also served as a prepaid MasterCard debit card, allowing users to reload the card with cash and receive direct deposits onto the card account. On September 13, 2011, the Oakland City Council decided to wait for a cost and feasibility study to be completed by late October before proceeding, hoping to begin issuing ID cards in 2012, barring any unforeseen circumstances. This, however, extended into 2012, with the City Council voting in favor of the final portion of the program on October 16, 2012, the first cards of the program to be issued on February 1, 2013. By 2013, the city had issued approximately 3,000 city ID cards. The fees and costs associated with the debit card option were controversial. The card program, marketed by California company SF Global, eventually eliminated the prepaid debit card functionality.

==== Richmond, California (2014) ====
On July 5, 2011, the Richmond city council voted unanimously to issue municipal identification cards to Richmond residents, regardless of immigration status. In a letter to the council urging passage of the measure, a city council member and the mayor argued that "many Richmond residents lack the necessary forms of official identification that are required to access financial institutions, jobs, housing, and protections for the home and workplace. These residents include immigrants, children, students, the homeless, transgender people, the indigent, the disabled, the elderly, runaway youth, and adult survivors of domestic violence." Richmond City ID launched in October 2014, originally with "an optional prepaid debit card function." The program is administered by a third-party vendor, SF Global LLC.

==== San Francisco, California (2009) ====
In November 2007, the board of supervisors of San Francisco voted to issue municipal ID cards to residents of the city, regardless of immigration status. The cards were officially launched on January 15, 2009. Proof of identity and of city residence is required.

=== Connecticut ===
==== New Haven, Connecticut (2007) ====
The Elm City Resident Card is an ID card used in New Haven, Connecticut, in the United States. The card was originally designed to protect the estimated 10,000 to 15,000 illegal immigrants in New Haven from being robbed or assaulted. All city residents can receive the card, which serves as a form of identification, debit card with a capacity of $150, library card, and a way to pay for parking meters. The cards were first issued in July 2007, and were the first municipal identification cards issued in the United States. The card costs $5 for children or $10 for adults.

Hartford, Connecticut (2017)

First issued May 22, 2017, the Hartford City ID is a "Government-issued identification card that is available to all Hartford residents who can verify their identification and residency status in Hartford."

=== Florida ===
==== Aventura ====
Aventura, Florida issues the optional Aventura ID Card to its residents.

==== Delray Beach ====
Delray Beach, Florida issues an optional residency identification card.

==== Sunny Isles Beach (2011) ====
Sunny Isles Beach, Florida offers the free and optional Sunny Isles Beach Resident ID Card to its residents.

=== Illinois ===
==== Chicago (2018) ====
On October 12, 2016, Chicago Mayor Rahm Emanuel and then City Clerk Susana Mendoza announced the launch of a Chicago Municipal ID program.

On April 26, 2018, city officials launched the Chicago CityKey, an optional, valid, government-issued ID card offered to all Chicago residents. CityKey serves as a three-in-one card for a valid government issued ID, Ventra card for Chicago Transit Authority, and Chicago Public Library services.

With the first 100,000 ID cards free of cost, initial response to the Chicago CityKey was extremely high and successful. In some city wards, residents waited hours in line to receive their card.

=== Indiana ===
==== Elkhart (2020) ====
In June 2020, Elkhart, Indiana's government passed a resolution to create a municipal identification card program called PRIDE (Proud Resident ID for Elkhart).

==== Goshen (2017) ====
In partnership with the Center for Healing & Hope, the city of Goshen launched the GRID (Goshen Resident ID) program in November 2017, after an executive order by mayor Jeremy Stutsman established its recognition.

==== Plymouth (2020) ====
In 2020, Plymouth, Indiana launched the PRIDE (Plymouth Resident Identification Endorsement) card.

==== South Bend (2016) ====
In 2016, South Bend, Indiana mayor Pete Buttigieg signed an executive order to help enable the city to establish a city identification card. The program formally launched in December of that year through a partnership with the nonprofit La Casa de Amistad, who produce the ID cards.

In the city's 2019 mayoral election, both the Democratic Party mayoral nominee James Mueller and the Republican Party mayoral nominee Sean M. Haas were in favor of retaining the city identification card program.

Many immigration advocates praised the program's approach for protecting undocumented immigrants. Criticism has been made about the fact that the program, run through a nonprofit, is not subject to government transparency laws. In August 2019, Judicial Watch launched litigation arguing that, by not disclosing staff emails related to the program, the City of South Bend was acting in violation of Indiana’s Access to Public Records Act.

=== Kansas ===
==== Wichita, Kansas (2025) ====
On March 18, 2025, the Wichita, Kansas City Council voted unanimously to create the City of Wichita ID, with the stated goal of lowering barriers for the homeless to access resources. An earlier draft proposal would have named the program the "Air Capital Card". The City of Wichita ID was launched on June 30, 2025.

=== Michigan ===
==== Washtenaw County, Michigan (2015) ====
On November 19, 2014, the Board of Commissioners of the county of Washtenaw, Michigan voted in favor of creating an identification program for county residents who would otherwise be unable to obtain a photo-ID. The program officially launched in June 2015. By November 2019, Washtenaw county had issued 2,000 cards. The Washtenaw ID program became the first local ID in the Midwest, and served as a model for a similar program in Detroit

==== Detroit, Michigan (2016) ====
On May 17, 2016, the city council of Detroit, Michigan voted in favor of the creation of a municipal identification program for city residents who struggle to otherwise obtain government-issued ID.

=== Minnesota ===
==== Northfield, Minnesota (2018) ====
On December 5, 2017, the city council of Northfield, Minnesota unanimously approved an ordinance establishing a city identification card program to be implemented in March 2018.

=== Missouri ===
==== Kansas City, Missouri (2024) ====
On July 13, 2023, the City Council of Kansas City, Missouri approved the creation of a municipal identification card. The Fountain Card program launched in January 2024, and is administered by the Kansas City Health Department. Along with providing access to city services, the Fountain Card can be used to open a bank account at WeDevelopment Credit Union in Kansas City. In December 2025, it was announced that additional benefits would be available through the Fountain Card, including discounts on entertainment, travel, electronics, retail, and fitness memberships.

==== City of St. Louis, Missouri (2026) ====
On January 10, 2025, the City of St. Louis, Missouri Board of Aldermen unanimously approved the creation of a municipal photo ID program, called the Gateway Card. St. Louis's Gateway Card has no impact on someone's immigration status. To address rumors that the new municipal ID card would lead to voter fraud, on January 31, 2025, Missouri's Republican Secretary of State Denny Hoskins issued a formal statement saying that "the recently introduced 'Gateway Card' by the City of St. Louis cannot be used as valid identification for voting in state elections." The Gateway ID Card launched on May 6, 2026.

=== New Jersey ===
==== Counties ====
===== Hudson County, New Jersey =====
The county clerk of Hudson County, New Jersey, Barbara A. Netchert, issues identification cards to resident of the county. The cards are available to residents of the county for a fee of ten dollars for adults and five dollars for minors, which is specified by the county as teenagers aged fourteen to sixteen.

===== Mercer County, New Jersey (2011) =====
Starting in April 2011, the Mercer County Area Community ID Card is being issued with the endorsement of the offices of the Mercer County Sheriff, the Mercer County Prosecutor, and the police departments of several municipalities, including Trenton, Princeton Borough and Princeton Township, West Windsor, Ewing Township and Plainsboro. The card is issued by the non profit Latin American Legal Defense and Education Fund (LALDEF) and is accepted by law enforcement agencies, municipal agencies, clinics, hospitals, libraries, social service agencies, and many stores and banks. Although is not an official government ID card, it facilitates access to basic community services to those who are unable to obtain other documents such as immigrants, youth, homeless persons, and those in recovery or re-entry programs. This card replaces the Trenton and Princeton Community ID cards that were issued in 2009 and 2010.

===== Monmouth County, New Jersey =====
The county clerk of Monmouth County, New Jersey, M. Clark French, issues identity cards to residents of the county. The cards are available only to U.S. citizens and legal permanent residents.

==== Municipalities ====
===== Asbury Park, New Jersey (2015) =====
Asbury Park issues an identification card to city residents. The cards became available August 1, 2015.

===== Dover =====
Dover, New Jersey offers a municipal ID card.

===== Elizabeth =====
Elizabeth, New Jersey offers a municipal ID card.

===== Highland Park =====
Highland Park, New Jersey offers a municipal ID card.

===== Madison (2020) =====
Madison, New Jersey offers a municipal ID card.

===== Morristown =====
Morristown, New Jersey offers a municipal ID card.

===== New Brunswick =====
New Brunswick, New Jersey offers the New Brunswick City ID card.

===== Newark, New Jersey (2015) =====
The City of Newark introduced a municipal identification program in August 2015 to all residents of Newark. Cards cost $15 for new applicants, however new applicants that are senior citizens or children only cost $8. A financial hardship application can be filed with the city if any of these fees are unable to be met by the applicant.

===== Paterson =====
Paterson, New Jersey offers a municipal ID card.

===== Perth Amboy =====
Perth Amboy, New Jersey offers a municipal ID card.

===== Plainfield, New Jersey (2013) =====
Starting in November 2013, Plainfield Community ID Cards is being issued with the support of the Plainfield Police Department. This card is being issued by a non-profit group Angels For Action, Inc. They were trained and mentored by the Latin American Legal Defense and Education Fund (LALDEF) from Mercer County,. For identification only, the local identity cards do not grant legal residency or the right to work. Approved by the Plainfied City Cooperation, the card is also accepted by law enforcement agencies, municipal agencies, clinics, hospitals, libraries, social service agencies, and many stores and banks. Angels For Action and other local organizations are also in the process trying to encourage the Plainfield City Council to approve a municipal identity ID Card system to supply cards at a larger scale for the growing population of Plainfield. Angels for Actions had also helped mentor and encourage ID Cards for Newark and Roselle.

===== Roselle, New Jersey (2015) =====
The city council of Roselle, New Jersey unanimously passed an ordinance that allowed the Borough to launch a community-wide identification card program on October 21, 2015 and began issuing cards on December 14, 2015.

===== Union City, New Jersey (2017) =====
The Union City, NJ board of commissioners decided to enact a municipal identification program starting March 1, 2017. The program is open to any resident of the city older than 14. The system was, in part, set up to allow residents of the city to gain identification for securing financial services (e.g. bank checking account).

=== New York ===
==== New York City (2015) ====
IDNYC
- Type: Municipal identification card
- Issued by: New York City Human Resources Administration
- First issued: January 12, 2015
- Purpose: Proof of identity and residency: Library card (NYPL, QPL, BPL); Broadway theatre and movie tickets discounts
- Valid in: New York City
- Eligibility: Persons age 10 and older with proof of identity and residency in New York City
- Expiration: Five years from date of issuance
- Cost: Free

In July 2007, New York City councilman Hiram Monserrate proposed setting up a municipal identity system for New York City residents similar to the New Haven plan. However, shortly thereafter Monserrate left the Council to the New York State Senate and the proposal was shelved.

On February 10, 2014, in his first State of the City address, New York City Mayor Bill de Blasio announced a new plan to create a New York City municipal identification card, named IDNYC, which would be available to all New Yorkers, regardless of immigration status. While any city resident could obtain a card, the mayor announced it as a way to allow city residents who lack legal immigration status in the United States to access municipal and private services and facilities that require photo identification. The cards also provide additional benefits such as discounts on movie tickets, Broadway shows, sporting events, and YMCA memberships. Additionally, cardholders are able to open a bank account at several financial institutions in New York City. The cards were first made available on January 12, 2015.

Over one million IDNYC identification cardholders were registered by April 2017. By 2020, the number of IDNYC cardholders had increased to over 1.3 million.

At least one honorary IDNYC identification card has been issued – to Pope Francis during his September 2015 visit to New York City.

==== Poughkeepsie ====
Poughkeepsie, New York issues the City of Poughkeepsie Municipal ID Card.

=== Pennsylvania ===
==== Philadelphia (2019) ====
Philadelphia issues an optional identification card to city residents. The PHL City ID cards became available in April 2019.

=== Rhode Island ===
==== Providence (2018) ====
Providence, Rhode Island issues an optional identification card to city residents. The IDPVD cards became available in June 2018.

=== Texas ===
==== El Paso (2023) ====
In October 2023, the city council of El Paso voted to create a pilot program for an "Enhanced Library Card" for those who are unable to obtain a driver's license or state ID card.

==== Other Texas cities (2022-present) ====
Other Texas cities which have launched enhanced library card systems are Austin, San Antonio, Harris County, and Dallas.

=== Washington, D.C. (2014) ===
As of May 1, 2014, Washington, D.C. issues the DC One Card to legal residents or visitors of the U.S., though some services may be available only to residents of the District. (Some undocumented immigrants may get the card if they have been issued a state driver's license or state non-driver ID card by one of the states that issues these credentials to undocumented immigrants, such as New Mexico, Utah, and Washington; or a school ID card.) The DC One Card is a consolidated credential designed to give adults and children access to DC government facilities and programs that was designed to help the District consolidate printing ID cards and save money. The DC One Card is also a building access card for DC government employees. For all public school secondary students and those who request it, the card includes immediate Metro SmarTrip® capability to help them travel.

=== Wisconsin ===
==== Milwaukee ====
The city of Milwaukee issues an optional municipal identification card to its residents. Becoming available in 2017, the cards were intended to be available for all of Milwaukee County, but county IDs were made illegal by the Wisconsin Legislature before they could be offered. The city IDs may be used to access city services and have been accepted as proof of identity at social venues.
