= Toni Harp =

American politician (born 1947)

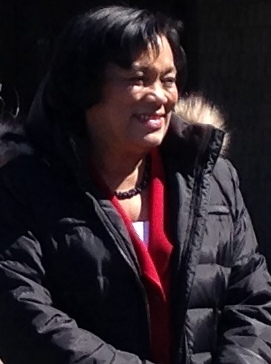

51st Mayor of New Haven
- In office January 1, 2014 – January 1, 2020
- Preceded by: John DeStefano Jr.
- Succeeded by: Justin Elicker

Member of the Connecticut State Senate from the 10th district
- In office January 1993 – January 2013
- Preceded by: Charles H. Allen III
- Succeeded by: Gary Winfield

Personal details
- Born: August 6, 1947 (age 79) San Francisco, California, U.S.
- Party: Democratic
- Other political affiliations: Working Families
- Children: 3
- Education: Roosevelt University; Yale University (M.E.D.)

Toni Nathaniel Harp (born August 6, 1947) is an American politician who served as the 51st Mayor of New Haven, Connecticut. Harp, a Democrat, was previously a state senator in Connecticut from 1993 to 2013. A resident of New Haven, Harp represented the western half of the city as well as part of West Haven while in the Connecticut Senate.

== Early life and career ==
Harp was born in San Francisco and graduated from Roosevelt University and received a Master of Environmental Design from Yale University. Prior to becoming mayor in the City of New Haven, Harp served as a State Senator and a New Haven Alderman; she defeated incumbent Senator Charles H. Allen III for the Democratic nomination in 1992.

In 2007, Harp introduced a bill to have the state pay for free diapers for poor mothers. Immediately following the Sandy Hook Elementary School shooting in 2012, State Senator Harp introduced a controversial bill for mandatory mental health screenings of all Connecticut school children.

== Mayor of New Haven ==
In Spring 2013, Harp announced her intention to run for Mayor of New Haven, a position long held by John DeStefano, Jr. Harp won the election over her opponent, Justin Elicker, by 10,602 to 8,865 votes, or 54.46 percent to 45.54 percent. She was reelected in 2015 with 88.83 percent of the vote against three independent candidates. She was reelected to a third term in 2017 with 77.61 percent of the vote against an independent candidate and Working Families Party candidate.

She is the first woman and the second African American (after John C. Daniels) to serve as Mayor of New Haven.

In April 2019, Harp announced that she would seek election to a fourth two-year term. Justin Elicker, Harp's 2013 opponent, defeated her by 58.8% to 41.5% in the Democratic primary. She ran under the Working Families Party label in the general election. She was defeated by Justin Elicker 70% to 30% in the general election on November 5.

== See also ==
- Connecticut Senate
- List of first African-American mayors

Political offices
Preceded by John DeStefano Jr.	Mayor of the City of New Haven; 2014–2020	Succeeded by Justin Elicker
