= John W. Murphy (Connecticut politician) =

American politician

John W. Murphy (January 16, 1878 – December 9, 1963), a Democrat, was Mayor of New Haven, Connecticut, elected to seven consecutive terms between 1932 and 1945. He was the city's leading political figure in the first half of the twentieth century.

Murphy left school in the sixth grade to help support his family. While he still was a child, he labored for years under hazardous conditions in a cigar factory and as a young man became an organizer for the Cigar Workers Union, the first trade union in the United States. He rose from union business agent to vice president of the Connecticut Federation of Labor. Murphy was elected to the New Haven Board of Alderman and served five terms as its President between 1922 and 1931.

By November, 1931, the city was in the midst of the Great Depression, suffering massive unemployment and a city government on the brink of bankruptcy. Murphy elected mayor by a coalition of the city's working classes, now largely unemployed. Murphy formed a coalition of business, union and civic leaders, including leading Democrats and Republicans, to stabilize the city's finances. Murphy refinanced the city's debt, thereby allowing the provision of food, shelter and material support for more than 60,000 underemployed citizens representing 40% of the total population.

Murphy's civic coalition anticipated the election of Roosevelt and the advent of the New Deal, which brought federal support starting in 1933. Murphy guided New Haven through the Depression and World War II, when the city's manufacturing base created thousands of new jobs providing materiel for the war effort.

Murphy, known popularly as “Honest John” and “The Singing Mayor” was a gifted writer, speaker and singer. He was a close advisor to Connecticut Governor Wilbur Cross, who asked him to serve as Lieutenant Governor, a position Murphy declined.

Murphy was married to Helen O'Connell and the couple had three children, Mary Ellen Murphy Mininberg, John W. Murphy, Jr. and Catherine Murphy Spodnick. Mary Ellen, a teacher in New Haven public schools, continued her father's work as a social activist and Democratic Party leader until her death in 2016.

Preceded by Thomas A. Tully	Mayors of New Haven, Connecticut; 1932 — 1935	Succeeded by William C. Celentano
