= John C. Daniels =

American politician (1936–2015)

49th Mayor of New Haven, Connecticut
- In office 1990–1993
- Preceded by: Biagio DiLieto
- Succeeded by: John DeStefano Jr.

Personal details
- Born: April 24, 1936 Macon, Georgia, U.S.
- Died: March 14, 2015 (aged 78)

John C. Daniels (April 25, 1936 – March 14, 2015) was an American politician who served as the mayor of New Haven, Connecticut, from 1990 until 1994.

== Early life and career ==
Daniels was born in Macon, Georgia. He attended high school at James Hillhouse High School in New Haven, where he was a standout football player. He continued his education at Villanova University, where he had an athletic scholarship to play football and earned a bachelor's degree in economics, and Occidental College, where he earned a master's degree in urban studies.

Before being elected to the State Senate, Daniels taught in the West Haven School System. In the years following his term as mayor, Daniels returned to teaching in the Hamden and East Haven school systems.

== Political career ==
A Democrat, Daniels served in the Connecticut State Senate. Before he was elected mayor, Daniels served in the Connecticut State Senate representing Connecticut's Tenth Senatorial District, which included parts of New Haven and West Haven. He also served on the New Haven Board of Aldermen in the 1970s. In 1989, he challenged incumbent New Haven mayor Democrat Biagio DiLieto in the Democratic primary. DeLieto chose not to run and, instead, supported his aide, John DeStefano, Jr. Daniels won the hotly contested primary which, in heavily Democratic New Haven, was tantamount to winning the general election. Daniels became the city's first African-American mayor. He was easily reelected in 1991. He stepped down after two terms and was succeeded by DeStefano.

Among Daniels' accomplishments as mayor was the introduction of community based policing to deal with the growing crime and drug problems in New Haven. Under his administration, the city became a model of community policing and pioneered many police strategies later adopted by larger cities.

Daniels was a deacon at the Dixwell Congregational Church (United Church of Christ) in New Haven. In 2006, the John C. Daniels Elementary School opened, named in his honor. A city of New Haven public school, it is operated as an interdistrict magnet school providing bilingual education in English and Spanish for students from prekindergarten to grade 8.

== Death ==
Daniels died on March 14, 2015.

Political offices
Preceded by Biagio DiLieto	Mayor of New Haven, Connecticut; 1990–1994	Succeeded by John DeStefano, Jr.
