= William Lanson =

19th century African American engineer and builder

William Lanson (born c. 1776-1782; died 1851) was an African-American man of New Haven, Connecticut remembered as an engineer and builder, and as a leader of New Haven’s African-American community. Lanson built nearly 1500 feet of New Haven’s Long Wharf in 1810 and 1811, bringing it nearly to its longest length, ultimately 3480 feet, the longest in the United States at that time. Lanson also built the New Haven portion of the Farmington Canal, the steamboat wharf, and much of the East Haven bridge. He was elected Black Governor for the years 1825 to 1830.

== Early life ==
William Lanson was born into slavery, possibly in Derby, Waterbury, or Woodbury, and later ran away from Southington. Lanson seems to have been manumitted in 1797, and landed in New Haven between 1803 and 1807.

== Marriage and children ==
Census records from 1820 show William Lanson living in New Haven at age 45 with a family of 13. In the census of 1830, a William Lanson is listed as 36 years old with a family of 4. William Lanson had a brother named Laban, and a Reuben Lanson is named as co-owner of some property with William. There was a Mrs. Docia Lanson associated with the grocery store, and Laban had a wife named Dorcas. There is also an Isaac Lanson, and a son of William named Isaiah. The exact relationship between some of these people is unknown, and the names William and Laban were common in the family. Lanson also had a wife who is unnamed.

== Lanson’s life in New Haven ==
William Lanson moved to New Haven around 1803, and established himself in stone quarrying and construction. Some of his family joined him, and they began to purchase property. In 1807, Mary Wooster sold property to William and Reuben Lanson, located in an area known to natives as the New Township, outside the boundaries of the original "nine squares" established when New Haven was founded. Land was cheap, and the Lansons purchased at least thirteen parcels there between 1807 and 1824. This area became known as “New Guinea,” and by the 1820’s, the Lansons operated a grocery store, a livery stable, a clothing store, a hotel, and a tenement. They were landlords to a growing Black population who found housing difficult to obtain from White landlords. This Black population also provided a labor pool for William Lanson’s operations. William Lanson’s son, Isaiah Lanson, claimed that in 1832 his father was worth about $20,000.

Lanson was respected by the Black community, who called him “King Lanson,” and they elected him Black Governor 1825-1830. Lanson was active in the Underground Railroad, sheltering enslaved runaways, and with Simeon Jocelyn, a White abolitionist, helped the Amistad captives find legal assistance. Lanson and Jocelyn also organized a Black church, the African Ecclesiastical Society.

As a free landowner, Lanson was legally entitled to vote, although Blacks were not allowed to do so. He, with another Black land owner named Bias Stanley, petitioned the Connecticut General Assembly in 1814 to be excused from paying taxes unless the Assembly acknowledged their right to vote. The General Assembly denied the petition. A few years later, the new state constitution of 1818 explicitly denied Blacks the right to vote.

== Engineering and construction projects ==
Lanson is best known for his contributions to the commercial infrastructure of New Haven in the early 19th century, including building almost 1500 feet of the Long Wharf. An eighty-foot square pier had been constructed in the harbor in 1770-1772 to allow large ships a place to dock and unload, but the cargo had to be rowed nearly 1/3 of a mile in boats to the old wharf on shore. Lanson’s contribution connected the pier with the existing wharf.

With the success of the Erie Canal, business men in New Haven, eager to gain better access to interior Connecticut, Massachusetts, and beyond, formed the Farmington Canal Company in 1824. With steamboat packets running between New Haven and New York City, investors saw the opportunity to make New Haven the premier port of southern New England.

James Hillhouse, the project’s superintendent, hired Lanson, who began construction on the walls of the canal basin in New Haven Harbor in 1827. Lanson hired 20 to 30 free Black men to help him, quarrying his own stone from Blue Mountain in East Haven. Lanson compensated each worker in full, although he was never fully paid, estimating his loss at $2,600.

== Lanson’s downfall ==
At first, Lanson and his family were praised, by Timothy Dwight, among other notables, for their contributions to the welfare of New Haven, and the White leaders of New Haven’s business and religious communities were happy to help the rise of a Black entrepreneur. The town’s Black population grew from 390 to 625 between 1810 and 1820, and at least 140 of these African Americans lived in Lanson’s New Guinea neighborhood.

However, by the 1820’s, many White New Haveners were becoming anxious about the growing Black population on the outskirts of town. The Farmington Canal and development of the harbor and wharf coincided with the early industrialization of the city. The demand for labor drew hundreds of transient sailors and unskilled laborers to work on the canal and the docks. Between 1820 and 1830, population grew from 8,350 to 11,000, including hundreds of Irish, mostly living in Slineyville, adjacent to Lanson’s properties in the New Township. Transient workers helped to transform New Haven in the 1820s, but as the city became industrialized, the demand for unskilled labor dropped. Skilled labor was needed for the new industries such as carriage-making, clock-making, and rug-weaving. The manufacturing facilities were located near Lanson's New Guinea, which had become desirable as a prime location for housing for these skilled workers.

With popular democracy looming, elites in New Haven feared the growing number of property-less Whites, and there was also a frankly racist fear of an ever-increasing Black population. The American Colonization Society (ACS) began a movement to move Black Americans back to Africa, promoting the idea that Blacks were a degrading influence that would drag down the White population. Impoverished Blacks were also seen as a tax burden. Reform societies stoked popular fears of the rising costs of poverty, drunkenness, and riotous behavior. Newspapers began a smear campaign against Lanson, while the banks began to demand repayment on his mortgages. Lanson was forced to sell out to White interests. He then purchased property east of there, on the river, where he opened a new hotel called Liberia.

A city policeman named Kneval began conducting night inspections of Lanson's hotel and boarding houses. Usually finding nothing amiss, one night Kneval found a young woman in bed with a sailor, and Lanson was soon charged with keeping a disorderly house. There was also feeling against Lanson from the White community because Blacks and Irish lived together in some of his properties. Lanson was known to enjoy card-playing, which at that time was illegal, and he enjoyed a drink, in a time when reform societies were calling for prohibition. He was jailed 5 times in six years, on petty charges, and spent 450 days in jail. In the end, Lanson lost everything, and in 1851 died in the almshouse in his 70’s.

== Honors ==
Lanson was recently honored with a bronze statue located on the Farmington Canal Heritage Greenway in New Haven, dedicated in September, 2020, a joint effort of the City of New Haven and the Amistad Committee. What Lanson actually looked like is unknown; the sculptor, Dana King of Oakland California, used models from West Africa to compose a conjectured likeness.

== Sources ==
- Fagbemi, Simisola, “City Unveils Statue of William Lanson, Black Engineer and Activist,” Yale Daily News, Published 1:58 AM, SEP 28, 2020, Accessed February 10, 2021, https://yaledailynews.com/blog/2020/09/28/city-unveils-statue-of-william-lanson-black-engineer-and-activist/.
- Harris, Katharine J, William Lanson, Triumph and Tragedy (New Haven: The Amistad Committee, 2010).
- Harris, Katherine J, “William Lanson, Businessman, Contractor, and Activist,” in African American Connecticut Explored, edited by Elizabeth J. Normen; with Katherine J. Harris, Stacey K. Close, and Wm. Frank Mitchell. (Middletown: Wesleyan University Press, 2013)
- Hinks, Peter, ““This Beautiful and Rapidly Improving Section of Our City”: Race, Labor, and Colonizationists in Early Industrializing New Haven, 1800-1830,” Labor: Studies in Working-Class History of the Americas, (March 2016), vol.16 #1, 65-91.
- Hinks, Peter P. “The Successes and Struggles of New Haven Entrepreneur William Lanson,” Web article, Connecticut History.org, accessed February 10, 2021, https://connecticuthistory.org/successes-and-struggles-of-new-haven-entrepreneur-william-lanson/
- McFadden, Maya, "Mr. Lanson is Back Home," the New Haven Independent, September 27, 2020, accessed February 20, 2021, https://www.newhavenindependent.org/index.php/archives/entry/william_lanson_statue_unveiling/.
- Trowbridge, Thomas R. “The History of Long Wharf in New Haven,” in The Papers of the New Haven Colony Historical Society, Vol. 1. (New Haven: Published by the Society, 1865).
