= Bartholomew F. Guida =

American politician

Bartholomew F. Guida (1914–1978) was a Democrat who was Mayor of New Haven for three terms from 1970 to 1975, succeeding Richard C. Lee. While in office he clashed with Yale University on several issues, repeatedly calling attention to the university's tax exemptions and opposing President Kingman Brewster over the construction of two new residential colleges.

He was believed to be suffering from depression when he committed suicide in his car on April 26, 1978, a little more than two years after leaving office.
