= Biagio DiLieto =

American politician

Biagio "Ben" DiLieto (November 25, 1922 – November 8, 1999) was mayor of New Haven, Connecticut, from 1980 to 1989, serving as the city's 48th mayor.

DiLieto was chief of police in New Haven from 1970 to 1976. He first ran for nomination for mayor in 1977, when he narrowly lost the Democratic primary to the incumbent, Frank Logue. He ran again in 1979, defeating Logue in the primary and winning election in November. He was re-elected four times, serving five two-year terms before he declined to run for re-election in 1989.

Preceded by Frank Logue	Mayor of New Haven, Connecticut; 1980–1989	Succeeded by John C. Daniels
