= List of mayors of New Haven, Connecticut =

Mayor of New Haven, Connecticut
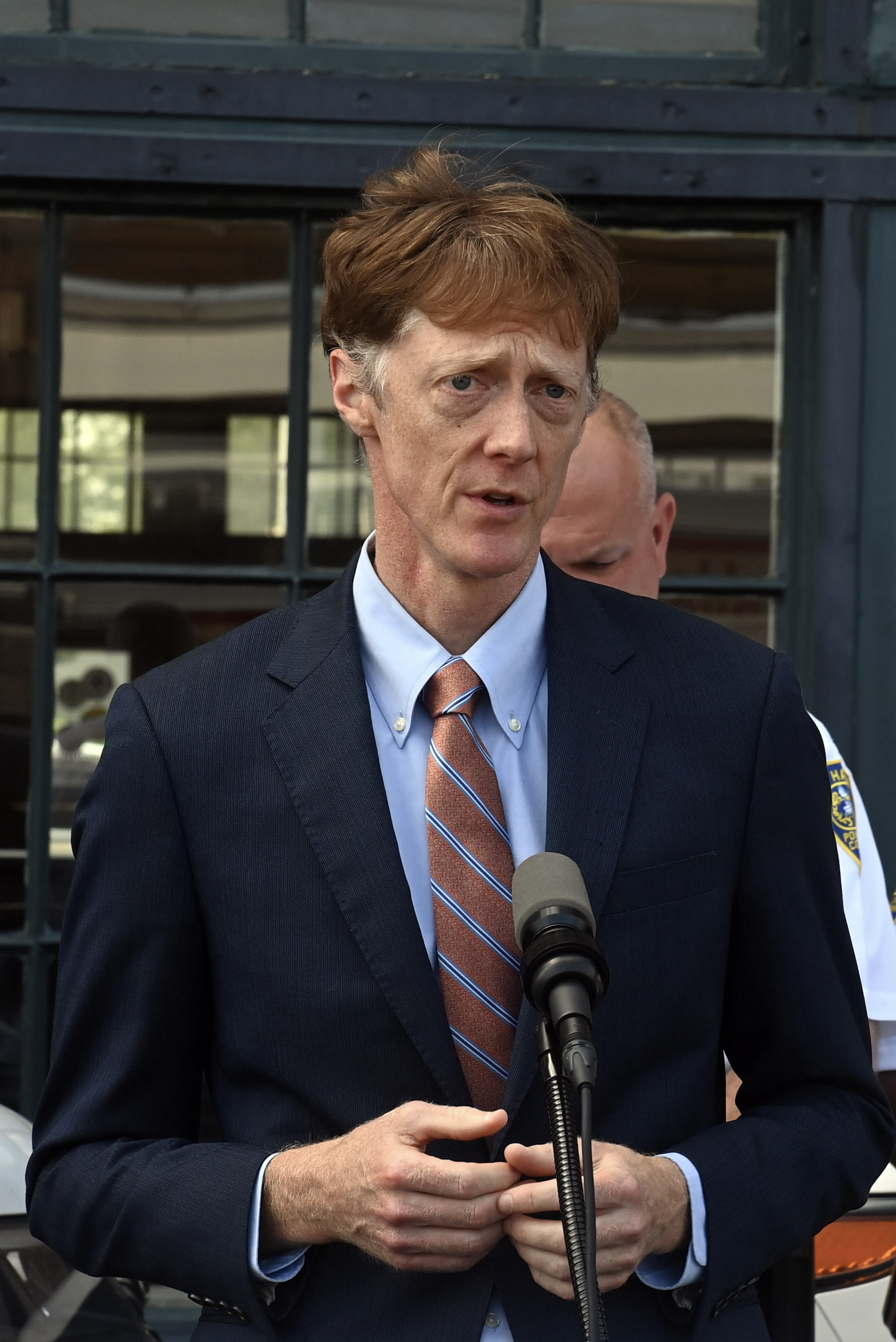
- Incumbent; Justin Elicker since 2020
- Type: Mayor
- Formation: 1784
- First holder: Roger Sherman
- Salary: $134,013

This is a list of the mayors of New Haven, Connecticut.

Before 1826, the city's mayors did not have a fixed term of office; once elected, they held office indefinitely, at the pleasure of the Connecticut General Assembly. Beginning in 1826 the mayor and members of the Common Council were elected an annual town meeting and held office until the following year's town meeting. Since the 1870s, New Haven's mayors have been elected to two-year terms.

As of July 2023, the mayor of New Haven earns an annual salary of $134,013.

Years served	Name	Party	Lived	Notes
1784–1793	Roger Sherman	Federalist	1721–1793	Signer of the Declaration of Independence. Later became a U.S. Senator.
1793–1803	Samuel Bishop	Democratic-Republican	1723–1803	Also probate judge
1803–1822	Elizur Goodrich	Federalist	1761–1849	Professor of law. Also served as a U.S. Congressman.
1822–1826	George Hoadley	Democratic-Republican	1781–1857	Bank president. Later became Mayor of Cleveland (1846–1847).
1826–1827	Simeon Baldwin	Federalist	1761–1851	Judge. Was previously a U.S. Congressman.
1827–1828	William Bristol	Democratic-Republican	1779–1836	Also State Senator
1828–1830	David Daggett	Federalist	1764–1851	Also U.S. Senator; CT House Speaker; Chief Justice of the CT Supreme Court
1830–1831	Ralph Ingersoll	Democrat	1789-1872	Also U.S. Congressman
1831–1832	Dennis Kimberly	Democrat	1790–1862	Lawyer. Also major general and member of Connecticut General Assembly. Was elected mayor again in 1833, but declined the office. Was chosen U.S. Senator in 1838.
1832–1833	Ebenezer Seeley	Democrat	1793–1866	
1833–1834	Noyes Darling	Whig	1782–1846	Judge. (Dennis Kimberly had been elected to fill this term, but declined to serve.)
1834–1839	Henry Collins Flagg	Whig	1792–1863	Lawyer, editor
1839–1842	Samuel Johnson Hitchcock	Whig	1786–1845	Lawyer, president of Yale Law School
1842–1845	Philip S. Galpin	Whig	1796–1872	Businessman (carpet manufacturing and insurance)
1846–1850	Henry E. Peck	Whig	1795–1867	Newspaper printer and publisher.
1850–1854	Aaron N. Skinner	Whig	1800–1858	Classical boarding school headmaster
1854–1855	Chauncey Jerome	Whig	1793–1868	Clock manufacturer
1855-1856	Alfred Blackman	Democrat	1807-1880	
1856–1860	Philip S. Galpin	Whig	1796–1872	Secretary of Mutual Security Insurance Company
1860–1863	Harmanus M. Welch	Democrat	1813–1889	Businessman who was founder and president of the New Haven Rolling Mill and president of the First National Bank.
1863-1865	Morris Tyler	Republican	1806–1876	
1865–1866	Erastus C. Scranton	Republican	1808–1866	
1866–1869	Lucien Wells Sperry	Democrat	1820−1890	Carpenter and merchant; committed suicide after embezzling trust funds; died $50,000 in debt.
1869-1870	William Fitch	Republican	1820-1877	
1870-1877	Henry G. Lewis	Democrat	1820-1891	
1877-1879	William R. Shelton	Democrat	1821-1892	Prosecuted by Republicans (as a Democratic ex-mayor) for his involvement in a scandal with a female employee
1879-1881	Hobart B. Bigelow	Republican	1834–1891	Businessman, founder of the Bigelow Manufacturing Co.
1881-1883	John Brownlee Robertson	Democrat	1809-1892	
1883-1885	Henry G. Lewis	Democrat	1820-1891	
1885-1887	George F. Holcomb	Democrat		
1887–1888	Samuel Amos York	Democrat	1839-1898	
1889–1890	Henry Franklin Peck	Republican	1828-1911	
1891–1894	Joseph B. Sargent	Democrat	1822–1907	Served three terms. Founder of Sargent & Co.
1895–1896	Albert C. Hendrick	Republican	1833-1912	ex-chief of the New Haven Fire Department
1897–1899	Frederick Benjamin Farnsworth	Republican	1851-1930	Presided over the enactment of a new city charter, which gave New Haven a unified administrative structure. Interred in Grove Street Cemetery, New Haven
1899–1901	Cornelius Thomas Driscoll	Democrat	1845–1931	born in Ireland, he was New Haven's first immigrant mayor
1901-1909	John Payne Studley	Republican	1846–1931	Used the police to stop performances of Bernard Shaw's play, "Mrs. Warren's Profession". Interred in Evergreen Cemetery, New Haven, CT
1910–1917	Frank J. Rice	Republican	1869–1917	Elected to four terms. Died in office.
1917	Samuel Campner	Republican	1887-1934	New Haven's first Jewish mayor
1918–1926	David E. FitzGerald	Democrat	1874-1942	
1926-1928	John B. Tower	Republican		
1929–1931	Thomas A. Tully	Republican	1886-1950	
1932–1944	John W. Murphy	Democrat	1878–1964	Labor leader
1945–1953	William C. Celentano	Republican	1904-1972	Served eight years. First Italian-American mayor of New Haven, funeral director.
1954–1970	Richard C. Lee	Democrat	1916–2003	Served eight terms. Was New Haven's youngest mayor.
1970–1975	Bartholomew F. Guida	Democrat	1914–1978	
1976–1979	Frank Logue	Democrat	1924–2010	Served two two-year terms as the city's chief executive. He won the office in the 1975 election, defeating incumbent Democratic mayor Bart Guida in a party primary.
1980–1989	Biagio "Ben" DiLieto	Democrat	1922–1999	Served five terms. Former police chief.
1990–1993	John C. Daniels	Democrat	1936–2015	First black mayor of New Haven.
1994–2013	John DeStefano, Jr.	Democrat	born 1955	New Haven's longest-serving mayor.
2014–2020	Toni Harp	Democrat	born 1949	First woman elected mayor and 2nd African American mayor of New Haven.
2020–present	Justin Elicker	Democrat	born 1975	

== See also ==
- Mayoral elections in New Haven, Connecticut
