= 2026 Connecticut House of Representatives election =

2026 Connecticut House of Representatives elections
- November 3, 2026

All 151 seats in the Connecticut House of Representatives 76 seats needed for a majority
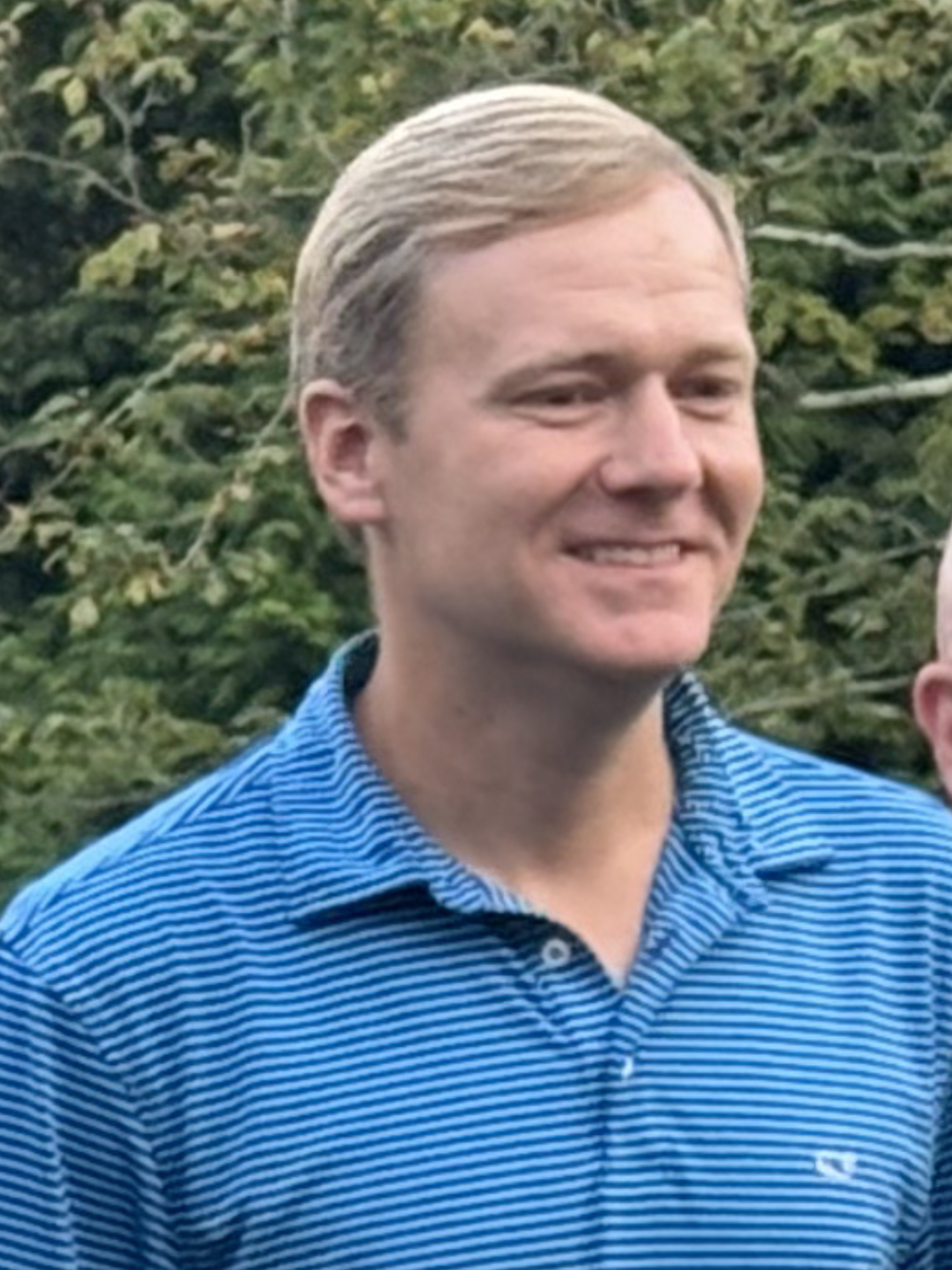

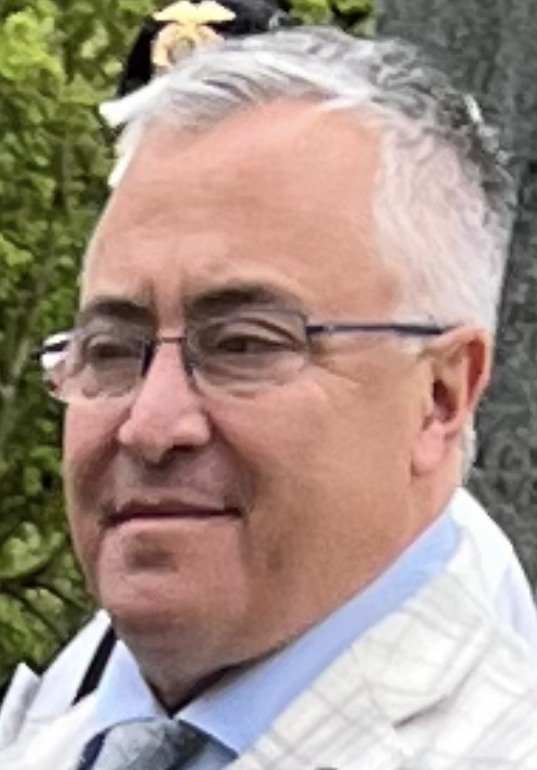
	Majority party	Minority party
Leader	Matthew Ritter	Vincent Candelora
Party	Democratic	Republican
Leader's seat	1st district	86th district
Last election	102	49
Seats won	116	35
Seat change	▲14	▼14
- Results: Democratic hold Democratic gain Republican hold
Speaker before election
Matthew Ritter
Democratic
Elected Speaker
TBD

The 2026 Connecticut House of Representatives election was held on November 3, 2026, alongside the other 2026 United States elections. Primary elections took place on August 11, 2026. Voters elected members of the Connecticut House of Representatives in all 151 of the U.S. state of Connecticut's legislative districts to serve a two-year term. Connecticut House Democrats would increase their supermajority by 14 seats.

== Retirements ==
=== Democrats ===
1. District 5: Maryam Khan retired to run for the 2nd Senate district.
2. District 10: Henry Genga retired.
3. District 18: Jillian Gilchrest retired to run for the U.S. House of Representatives in CT-01.
4. District 19: Tammy Exum retired.
5. District 83: Jack Fazzino retired to run for the 13th Senate district.
6. District 85: Mary Mushinsky retired.
7. District 97: Al Paolillo retired to run for the 11th Senate district.
8. District 118: Frank Smith retired.
9. District 136: Jonathan Steinberg retired.

=== Republicans ===
1. District 8: Tim Ackert retired to run for lieutenant governor, but was not so nominated at the convention.
2. District 23: Devin Carney retired.
3. District 34: Irene Haines retired.
4. District 113: Amy Romano retired.

== Incumbents defeated ==
=== In primary election ===
==== Democrats ====
1. District 92: Pat Dillon lost re-nomination to Eli Sabin.

=== In general election ===
==== Republicans ====
1. District 35: Chris Aniskovich lost re-election to Cinzia Lettieri.
2. District 43: Greg Howard lost re-election to Bill Heughins.
3. District 48: Mark DeCaprio lost re-election to Bob Fernandez.
4. Distirct 55: Steve Weir lost re-election to Ellen Paul.
5. District 58: Carol Hall lost re-election to Rick LeBorious.
6. District 62: Mark Anderson lost re-election to Kim Becker.
7. Distirct 77: Cara Pavalock-D'Amato lost re-election to DeWayne Wynn Jr.
8. District 90: Craig Fishbein lost re-election to David Fritz.
9. District 106: Mitch Bolinsky lost re-election to Michelle Embree Ku.
10. District 107: Martin Foncello lost re-election to Julie Kerton.
11. District 122: Ben McGorty lost re-election to Mandy Kilmartin.

== Open seats that changed parties ==
=== Republican seats won by Democrats ===
1. District 8: Won by Francis Lombard.
2. District 23: Won by Jane Wisialowski.
3. District 113: Won by Bryan Lizotte.

== Predictions ==
Source	Ranking	As of
Sabato's Crystal Ball	Safe D	January 22, 2026
State Navigate	Safe D	October 14, 2026

== Summary of results by district ==
District	2024 Pres.	Incumbent	Party	Elected Representative	Outcome
1	D+73.8	Matthew Ritter	Dem	Matthew Ritter	Dem Hold
2	D+12.1	Raghib Allie-Brennan	Dem	Raghib Allie-Brennan	Dem Hold
3	D+51.5	Minnie Gonzalez	Dem	Minnie Gonzalez	Dem Hold
4	D+60.9	Julio Concepcion	Dem	Julio Concepcion	Dem Hold
5	D+58.8	Maryam Khan	Dem	Kyle Anderson	Dem Hold
6	D+46.7	James Sánchez	Dem	James Sánchez	Dem Hold
7	D+81.3	Joshua Hall	Dem	Joshua Hall	Dem Hold
8	D+1.6	Tim Ackert	Rep	Francis Lombard	Dem Gain
9	D+31.7	Jason Rojas	Dem	Jason Rojas	Dem Hold
10	D+37.7	Henry Genga	Dem	Angie Parkinson	Dem Hold
11	D+39.7	Patrick Biggins	Dem	Patrick Biggins	Dem Hold
12	D+32.0	Geoff Luxenberg	Dem	Geoff Luxenberg	Dem Hold
13	D+30.5	Jason Edward Doucette	Dem	Jason Edward Doucette	Dem Hold
14	D+20.2	Tom Delnicki	Rep	Tom Delnicki	GOP Hold
15	D+67.5	Bobby Gibson	Dem	Bobby Gibson	Dem Hold
16	D+29.7	Melissa Osborne	Dem	Melissa Osborne	Dem Hold
17	D+20.8	Eleni Kavros DeGraw	Dem	Eleni Kavros DeGraw	Dem Hold
18	D+55.7	Jillian Gilchrest	Dem	Tiffani McGinnis	Dem Hold
19	D+46.4	Tammy Exum	Dem	Olaleye Onikuyide	Dem Hold
20	D+27.1	Kate Farrar	Dem	Kate Farrar	Dem Hold
21	D+20.3	Mike Demicco	Dem	Mike Demicco	Dem Hold
22	R+3.8	Rebecca Martinez	Dem	Rebecca Martinez	Dem Hold
23	D+18.0	Devin Carney	Rep	Jane Wisialowski	Dem Gain
24	D+26.0	Emmanuel Sanchez	Dem	Emmanuel Sanchez	Dem Hold
25	D+30.6	Iris Sanchez	Dem	Iris Sanchez	Dem Hold
26	D+15.0	David DeFronzo	Dem	David DeFronzo	Dem Hold
27	D+14.5	Gary Turco	Dem	Gary Turco	Dem Hold
28	D+13.9	Amy Morrin Bello	Dem	Amy Morrin Bello	Dem Hold
29	D+9.3	Kerry Szeps Wood	Dem	Kerry Szeps Wood	Dem Hold
30	R+7.2	Donna Veach	Rep	Donna Veach	GOP Hold
31	D+25.2	Jill Barry	Dem	Moise Carelus	Dem Hold
32	D+8.2	Christie Carpino	Rep	Christie Carpino	GOP Hold
33	D+32.3	Brandon Chafee	Dem	Brandon Chafee	Dem Hold
34	D+0.5	Irene Haines	Rep	Melissa Ziobron	GOP Hold
35	D+6.8	Chris Aniskovich	Rep	Cinzia Lettieri	Dem Gain
36	D+16.2	Renee LaMark Muir	Dem	Renee LaMark Muir	Dem Hold
37	D+18.6	Nick Menapace	Dem	Nick Menapace	Dem Hold
38	D+8.7	Nick Gauthier	Dem	Nick Gauthier	Dem Hold
39	D+44.1	Anthony Nolan	Dem	Anthony Nolan	Dem Hold
40	D+22.2	Dan Gaiewski	Dem	Dan Gaiewski	Dem Hold
41	D+32.8	Aundre Bumgardner	Dem	Aundre Bumgardner	Dem Hold
42	D+27.9	Savet Constantine	Dem	Savet Constantine	Dem Hold
43	D+9.4	Greg Howard	Rep	Bill Heughins	Dem Gain
44	R+24.0	Anne Dauphinais	Rep	Anne Dauphinais	GOP Hold
45	R+12.6	Brian Lanoue	Rep	Brian Lanoue	GOP Hold
46	D+23.2	Derell Wilson	Dem	Derell Wilson	Dem Hold
47	R+16.6	Doug Dubitsky	Rep	Doug Dubitsky	GOP Hold
48	D+0.9	Mark DeCaprio	Rep	Bob Fernandez	Dem Gain
49	D+19.8	Susan Johnson	Dem	Susan Johnson	Dem Hold
50	D+1.9	Pat Boyd	Dem	Pat Boyd	Dem Hold
51	R+19.2	Chris Stewart	Rep	Chris Stewart	GOP Hold
52	R+14.7	Kurt Vail	Rep	Kurt Vail	GOP Hold
53	D+5.5	Tammy Nuccio	Rep	Tammy Nuccio	GOP Hold
54	D+49.0	Gregory Haddad	Dem	Gregory Haddad	Dem Hold
55	D+7.9	Steve Weir	Rep	Ellen Paul	Dem Gain
56	D+18.7	Kevin Brown	Dem	Kevin Brown	Dem Hold
57	D+3.5	Jaime Foster	Dem	Jaime Foster	Dem Hold
58	D+6.6	John Santanella	Dem	John Santanella	Dem Hold
59	R+0.2	Carol Hall	Rep	Rick Leborious	Dem Gain
60	D+28.2	Jane Garibay	Dem	Jane Garibay	Dem Hold
61	D+1.1	Tami Zawistowski	Rep	Tami Zawistowski	GOP Hold
62	D+1.1	Mark Anderson	Rep	Kim Becker	Dem Gain
63	R+15.6	Jay Case	Rep	Jay Case	GOP Hold
64	D+28.2	Maria Horn	Dem	Maria Horn	Dem Hold
65	R+11.3	Joseph Canino	Rep	Joseph Canino	GOP Hold
66	R+3.4	Karen Reddington-Hughes	Rep	Karen Reddington-Hughes	GOP Hold
67	R+5.2	Bill Buckbee	Rep	Bill Buckbee	GOP Hold
68	R+28.9	Joseph Polletta	Rep	Joseph Polletta	GOP Hold
69	D+3.0	Jason Buchsbaum	Rep	Jason Buchsbaum	GOP Hold
70	R+10.2	Seth Bronko	Rep	Seth Bronko	GOP Hold
71	R+8.9	William Pizzuto	Rep	William Pizzuto	GOP Hold
72	D+27.7	Larry Butler	Dem	Larry Butler	Dem Hold
73	D+9.5	Ronald Napoli Jr.	Dem	Ronald Napoli Jr.	Dem Hold
74	D+10.2	Michael DiGiovancarlo	Dem	Michael DiGiovancarlo	Dem Hold
75	D+21.2	Geraldo Reyes	Dem	Geraldo Reyes	Dem Hold
76	R+18.9	John Piscopo	Rep	John Piscopo	GOP Hold
77	R+0.5	Cara Pavalock-D'Amato	Rep	DeWayne Wynn	Dem Gain
78	R+16.4	Joe Hoxha	Rep	Joe Hoxha	GOP Hold
79	D+4.2	Mary Fortier	Dem	Mary Fortier	Dem Hold
80	R+25.6	Gale Mastrofrancesco	Rep	Gale Mastrofrancesco	GOP Hold
81	R+3.4	Chris Poulos	Dem	Chris Poulos	Dem Hold
82	D+13.0	Michael Quinn	Dem	Michael Quinn	Dem Hold
83	D+2.0	Jack Fazzino	Dem	Chad Cardillo	Dem Hold
84	D+19.3	Hilda Santiago	Dem	Hilda Santiago	Dem Hold
85	D+7.5	Mary Mushinsky	Dem	Samuel Carmody	Dem Hold
86	R+13.1	Vincent Candelora	Rep	Vincent Candelora	GOP Hold
87	R+7.7	Dave Yaccarino	Rep	Dave Yaccarino	GOP Hold
88	D+41.6	Josh Elliott	Dem	Josh Elliott	Dem Hold
89	R+10.0	Lezlye Zupkus	Rep	Lezlye Zupkus	GOP Hold
90	R+1.8	Craig Fishbein	Rep	David Fritz	Dem Gain
91	D+52.9	Laurie Sweet	Dem	Laurie Sweet	Dem Hold
92	D+71.4	Patricia Dillon	Dem	Eli Sabin	Dem Hold
93	D+71.1	Toni Walker	Dem	Toni Walker	Dem Hold
94	D+72.9	Steven Winter	Dem	Steven Winter	Dem Hold
95	D+50.0	Juan Candelaria	Dem	Juan Candelaria	Dem Hold
96	D+73.4	Roland Lemar	Dem	Roland Lemar	Dem Hold
97	D+36.9	Alphonse Paolillo	Dem	Wildaliz Bermudez	Dem Hold
98	D+30.0	Moira Rader	Dem	Moira Rader	Dem Hold
99	R+9.6	Joseph Zullo	Rep	Joseph Zullo	GOP Hold
100	D+25.9	Kai Belton	Dem	Kai Belton	Dem Hold
101	D+18.7	John-Michael Parker	Dem	John-Michael Parker	Dem Hold
102	D+14.8	Robin Comey	Dem	Robin Comey	Dem Hold
103	D+14.6	Liz Linehan	Dem	Liz Linehan	Dem Hold
104	D+2.0	Kara Rochelle	Dem	Kara Rochelle	Dem Hold
105	R+17.3	Nicole Klarides-Ditria	Rep	Nicole Klarides-Ditria	GOP Hold
106	D+10.2	Mitch Bolinsky	Rep	Michelle Embree Ku	Dem Gain
107	R+2.1	Martin Foncello	Rep	Julie Kerton	Dem Gain
108	R+4.1	Patrick Callahan	Rep	Patrick Callahan	GOP Hold
109	D+5.2	Farley Santos	Dem	Farley Santos	Dem Hold
110	D+13.5	Bob Godfrey	Dem	Bob Godfrey	Dem Hold
111	D+27.3	Aimee Berger-Girvalo	Dem	Aimee Berger-Girvalo	Dem Hold
112	R+1.9	Tony Scott	Rep	Tony Scott	GOP Hold
113	R+10.8	Amy Romano	Rep	Bryan Lizotte	Dem Gain
114	D+13.2	Mary Welander	Dem	Mary Welander	Dem Hold
115	D+21.4	Bill Heffernan	Dem	Bill Heffernan	Dem Hold
116	D+42.4	Treneé McGee	Dem	Treneé McGee	Dem Hold
117	D+4.0	Michael Shannon	Dem	Michael Shannon	Dem Hold
118	D+9.4	Frank Smith	Dem	Toni Lombardi	Dem Hold
119	R+12.5	Kathy Kennedy	Rep	Kathy Kennedy	GOP Hold
120	D+11.6	Kaitlyn Shake	Dem	Kaitlyn Shake	Dem Hold
121	D+27.4	Joe Gresko	Dem	Joe Gresko	Dem Hold
122	R+3.5	Ben McGorty	Rep	Mandy Kilmartin	Dem Gain
123	D+4.3	David Rutigliano	Rep	David Rutigliano	GOP Hold
124	D+54.5	Andre Baker	Dem	Andre Baker	Dem Hold
125	D+15.7	Tom O'Dea	Rep	Tom O'Dea	GOP Hold
126	D+50.9	Fred Gee	Dem	Fred Gee	Dem Hold
127	D+32.7	Marcus Brown	Dem	Marcus Brown	Dem Hold
128	D+50.5	Christopher Rosario	Dem	Christopher Rosario	Dem Hold
129	D+44.7	Steven Stafstrom	Dem	Steven Stafstrom	Dem Hold
130	D+55.6	Antonio Felipe	Dem	Antonio Felipe	Dem Hold
131	R+16.3	Arnold Jensen	Rep	Arnold Jensen	GOP Hold
132	D+27.0	Jennifer Leeper	Dem	Jennifer Leeper	Dem Hold
133	D+26.8	Cristin McCarthy Vahey	Dem	Cristin McCarthy Vahey	Dem Hold
134	D+17.2	Sarah Keitt	Dem	Sarah Keitt	Dem Hold
135	D+30.3	Anne Hughes	Dem	Anne Hughes	Dem Hold
136	D+44.0	Jonathan Steinberg	Dem	Lee Goldstein	Dem Hold
137	D+31.2	Kadeem Roberts	Dem	Kadeem Roberts	Dem Hold
138	D+4.9	Kenneth Gucker	Dem	Kenneth Gucker	Dem Hold
139	D+7.6	Larry Pemberton	Dem	Larry Pemberton	Dem Hold
140	D+42.1	Travis Simms	Dem	Travis Simms	Dem Hold
141	D+22.8	Tracy Marra	Rep	Tracy Marra	Dem Hold
142	D+25.7	Lucy Dathan	Dem	Lucy Dathan	Dem Hold
143	D+22.4	Dominique Johnson	Dem	Dominique Johnson	Dem Hold
144	D+27.6	Hubert Douglas Delany	Dem	Hubert Douglas Delany	Dem Hold
145	D+43.9	Corey Paris	Dem	Corey Paris	Dem Hold
146	D+31.2	Eilish Collins Main	Dem	Eilish Collins Main	Dem Hold
147	D+17.4	Matt Blumenthal	Dem	Matt Blumenthal	Dem Hold
148	D+26.4	Jonathan Jacobson	Dem	Jonathan Jacobson	Dem Hold
149	D+13.0	Tina Courpas	Rep	Tina Courpas	GOP Hold
150	D+22.2	Steve Meskers	Dem	Steve Meskers	Dem Hold
151	D+16.5	Hector Arzeno	Dem	Hector Arzeno	Dem Hold

== Election results ==
=== District 1 ===
Connecticut's 1st House of Representatives district election, 2026
Party	Candidate	Votes	%
Democratic	Matthew Ritter (incumbent)		%
Total votes			%

=== District 2 ===
Connecticut's 2nd House of Representatives district election, 2026
Party	Candidate	Votes	%
Democratic	Raghib Allie-Brennan (incumbent)		%
Republican	Deborah Rizzo		%
Total votes			%

=== District 3 ===
Connecticut's 3rd House of Representatives district election, 2026
Party	Candidate	Votes	%
Democratic	Minnie Gonzalez (incumbent)		%
Total votes			%

=== District 4 ===
August 11, 2026 Democratic primary
Party	Candidate	Votes	%
Democratic	Julio Concepcion (incumbent)	554	67.1%
Democratic	Venice Sotomayor	272	32.9%
Total votes		826	100%

Connecticut's 4th House of Representatives district election, 2026
Party	Candidate	Votes	%
Democratic	Julio Concepcion (incumbent)		%
Total votes			%

=== District 5 ===
Connecticut's 5th House of Representatives district election, 2026
Party	Candidate	Votes	%
Democratic	Kyle Anderson		%
Total votes			%

=== District 6 ===
Connecticut's 6th House of Representatives district election, 2026
Party	Candidate	Votes	%
Democratic	James Sanchez (incumbent)		%
Republican	Nicole Roscoe		%
Total votes			%

=== District 7 ===
Connecticut's 7th House of Representatives district election, 2026
Party	Candidate	Votes	%
Democratic	Joshua M. Hall (incumbent)		%
Total votes			%

=== District 8 ===
Connecticut's 8th House of Representatives district election, 2026
Party	Candidate	Votes	%
Republican	William Gifford		%
Democratic	Francis Lombard		%
Total votes			%

=== District 9 ===
Connecticut's 9th House of Representatives district election, 2026
Party	Candidate	Votes	%
Democratic	Jason Rojas (incumbent)		%
Total votes			%

=== District 10 ===
Connecticut's 10th House of Representatives district primary election, 2026
Party	Candidate	Votes	%
Democratic	Angie Parkinson	840	51.3%
Democratic	Tyron Harris	798	48.7%
Total votes		1,638	100%

Connecticut's 10th House of Representatives district election, 2026
Party	Candidate	Votes	%
Democratic	Angie Parkinson		%
Republican	Chris Tierinni		%
Total votes			%

=== District 11 ===
Connecticut's 11th House of Representatives district election, 2026
Party	Candidate	Votes	%
Democratic	Patrick Biggins (incumbent)		%
Republican	Salema Davis		%
Total votes			%

=== District 12 ===
Connecticut's 12th House of Representatives district election, 2026
Party	Candidate	Votes	%
Democratic	Geoff Luxenberg (incumbent)		%
Total votes			%

=== District 13 ===
Connecticut's 13th House of Representatives district election, 2026
Party	Candidate	Votes	%
Democratic	Jason Doucette (incumbent)		%
Republican	Bianca Stanescu		%
Total votes			%

=== District 14 ===
Connecticut's 14th House of Representatives district election, 2026
Party	Candidate	Votes	%
Republican	Tom Delnicki (incumbent)		%
Democratic	Harrison Amadasun		%
Total votes			%

=== District 15 ===
Connecticut's 15th House of Representatives district election, 2026
Party	Candidate	Votes	%
Democratic	Bobby Gibson (incumbent)		%
Republican	Seth Pitts		%
Total votes			%

=== District 16 ===
Connecticut's 16th House of Representatives district election, 2026
Party	Candidate	Votes	%
Democratic	Melissa Osborne (incumbent)		%
Republican	Jason Levy		%
Total votes			%

=== District 17 ===
Connecticut's 17th House of Representatives district election, 2026
Party	Candidate	Votes	%
Democratic	Eleni Kavros DeGraw (incumbent)		%
Republican	Andrew Ziemba		%
Total votes			%

=== District 18 ===
Connecticut's 18th House of Representatives district election, 2026
Party	Candidate	Votes	%
Democratic	Tiffani McGinnis		%
Republican	Phillip Tummescheit		%
Total votes			%

=== District 19 ===
Connecticut's 19th House of Representatives district election, 2026
Party	Candidate	Votes	%
Democratic	Olaleye Onikuyide		%
Total votes			%

=== District 20 ===
Connecticut's 20th House of Representatives district election, 2026
Party	Candidate	Votes	%
Democratic	Kate Farrar (incumbent)		%
Total votes			%

=== District 21 ===
Connecticut's 21st House of Representatives district election, 2026
Party	Candidate	Votes	%
Democratic	Mike Demicco (incumbent)		%
Republican	Gary Palumbo		%
Total votes			%

=== District 22 ===
Connecticut's 22nd House of Representatives district election, 2026
Party	Candidate	Votes	%
Democratic	Rebecca Martinez (incumbent)		%
Republican	Richard Mette		%
Total votes			%

=== District 23 ===
Connecticut's 23rd House of Representatives district election, 2026
Party	Candidate	Votes	%
Republican	Barbara Labriola		%
Democratic	Jane Wisialowski		%
Total votes			%

=== District 24 ===
Connecticut's 24th House of Representatives district election, 2026
Party	Candidate	Votes	%
Democratic	Manny Sanchez (incumbent)		%
Republican	Tina Santana		%
Total votes			%

=== District 25 ===
Connecticut's 25th House of Representatives district election, 2026
Party	Candidate	Votes	%
Democratic	Iris Sanchez (incumbent)		%
Republican	James Vaughan		%
Total votes			%

=== District 26 ===
Connecticut's 26th House of Representatives district election, 2026
Party	Candidate	Votes	%
Democratic	David DeFronzo (incumbent)		%
Republican	Sal Simsek		%
Total votes			%

=== District 27 ===
Connecticut's 27th House of Representatives district election, 2026
Party	Candidate	Votes	%
Democratic	Gary Turco (incumbent)		%
Total votes			%

=== District 28 ===
Connecticut's 28th House of Representatives district election, 2026
Party	Candidate	Votes	%
Democratic	Amy Morrin Bello (incumbent)		%
Republican	William Davidson		%
Total votes			%

=== District 29 ===
Connecticut's 29th House of Representatives district election, 2026
Party	Candidate	Votes	%
Democratic	Kerry Szeps Wood (incumbent)		%
Republican	Stanley Stasiowski		%
Total votes			%

=== District 30 ===
Connecticut's 30th House of Representatives district election, 2026
Party	Candidate	Votes	%
Republican	Donna Veach (incumbent)		%
Democratic	Linda Pierce		%
Total votes			%

=== District 31 ===
Incumbent Representative Jill Barry initially ran for reelection as a Democrat. However, at the nominating convention on May 21, she unexpectedly lost the party nomination to Moses Carelus. Instead of challenging Carelus in the primary, Barry opted to run on both the Republican and Independent lines for the general election. It is unknown that if Barry wins reelection whether she will serve as an Independent, Republican, or rejoin the Democratic Party in the next term.

May 21, 2026 Democratic caucus
Party	Candidate	Votes	%
Democratic	Moses Carelus	59	62.8%
Democratic	Jill Barry (incumbent)	35	37.2%
Total votes		94	100.0%

August 11, 2026 Democratic primary
Party	Candidate	Votes	%
Democratic	Moses Carelus	1,528	68.2%
Democratic	Anthony DiLizia	713	31.8%
Total votes		2,241	100%

Connecticut's 31st House of Representatives district election, 2026
Party	Candidate	Votes	%
Independent Party	Jill Barry		%
Republican	Jill Barry		%
Total	Jill Barry (Incumbent)		%
Democratic	Moses Carelus		%
Total votes			%

=== District 32 ===
Connecticut's 32th House of Representatives district election, 2026
Party	Candidate	Votes	%
Republican	Christie Carpino (incumbent)		%
Democratic	Marilyn Teitelbaum Dworkin		%
Total votes			%

=== District 33 ===
Connecticut's 33rd House of Representatives district election, 2026
Party	Candidate	Votes	%
Democratic	Brandon Chafee (incumbent)		%
Total votes			%

=== District 34 ===
Connecticut's 34th House of Representatives district election, 2026
Party	Candidate	Votes	%
Republican	Melissa Ziobron		%
Democratic	Meghan Rosenfeld		%
Total votes			%

=== District 35 ===
Connecticut's 35th House of Representatives district election, 2026
Party	Candidate	Votes	%
Republican	Chris Aniskovich (incumbent)		%
Democratic	Cinzia Lettieri		%
Total votes			%

=== District 36 ===
Connecticut's 36th House of Representatives district election, 2026
Party	Candidate	Votes	%
Democratic	Renee LaMark Muir (incumbent)		%
Republican	Guy Tuccero		%
Total votes			%

=== District 37 ===
Connecticut's 37th House of Representatives district election, 2026
Party	Candidate	Votes	%
Democratic	Nick Menapace (incumbent)		%
Republican	Anne Santoro		%
Total votes			%

=== District 38 ===
Connecticut's 38th House of Representatives district election, 2026
Party	Candidate	Votes	%
Democratic	Nick Gauthier (incumbent)		%
Republican	John Foley		%
Total votes			%

=== District 39 ===
Connecticut's 39th House of Representatives district election, 2026
Party	Candidate	Votes	%
Democratic	Anthony Nolan (incumbent)		%
Republican	John Russell		%
Total votes			%

=== District 40 ===
Connecticut's 40th House of Representatives district election, 2026
Party	Candidate	Votes	%
Democratic	Dan Gaiewski (incumbent)		%
Republican	Isabelle Roode		%
Total votes			%

=== District 41 ===
Connecticut's 41st House of Representatives district election, 2026
Party	Candidate	Votes	%
Democratic	Aundre Bumgardner (incumbent)		%
Republican	Thaler Hefel		%
Total votes			%

=== District 42 ===
Connecticut's 42nd House of Representatives district election, 2026
Party	Candidate	Votes	%
Democratic	Savet Constantine (incumbent)		%
Total votes			%

=== District 43 ===
Connecticut's 43rd House of Representatives district election, 2026
Party	Candidate	Votes	%
Republican	Greg Howard (incumbent)		%
Democratic	Bill Heughins		%
Total votes			%

=== District 44 ===
Connecticut's 44th House of Representatives district election, 2026
Party	Candidate	Votes	%
Republican	Anne Dauphinais (incumbent)		%
Democratic	Samantha Derenthal		%
Total votes			%

=== District 45 ===
Connecticut's 45th House of Representatives district election, 2026
Party	Candidate	Votes	%
Republican	Brian Lanoue (incumbent)		%
Democratic	Matt Danieluk		%
Total votes			%

=== District 46 ===
Connecticut's 46th House of Representatives district election, 2026
Party	Candidate	Votes	%
Democratic	Derell Wilson (incumbent)		%
Republican	Marica Wilbur		%
Total votes			%

=== District 47 ===
Connecticut's 47th House of Representatives district election, 2026
Party	Candidate	Votes	%
Republican	Doug Dubitsky (incumbent)		%
Democratic	Marcus Palumbo		%
Total votes			%

=== District 48 ===
Connecticut's 48th House of Representatives district election, 2026
Party	Candidate	Votes	%
Republican	Mark DeCaprio (incumbent)		%
Democratic	Bob Fernandez		%
Total votes			%

=== District 49 ===
Connecticut's 49th House of Representatives district election, 2026
Party	Candidate	Votes	%
Democratic	Susan Johnson (incumbent)		%
Republican	Brian Saucier		%
Total votes			%

=== District 50 ===
August 11, 2026 Republican Primary
Party	Candidate	Votes	%
Republican	Anthony Emilio	368	80.3%
Republican	Jaden MacCormack	90	19.7%
Total votes		458	100%

Connecticut's 50th House of Representatives district election, 2026
Party	Candidate	Votes	%
Democratic	Pat Boyd (incumbent)		%
Republican	Anthony Emilio		%
Total votes			%

=== District 51 ===
Connecticut's 51st House of Representatives district election, 2026
Party	Candidate	Votes	%
Republican	Chris Stewart (incumbent)		%
Democratic	Lina Wagner		%
Total votes			%

=== District 52 ===
Connecticut's 52nd House of Representatives district election, 2026
Party	Candidate	Votes	%
Republican	Kurt Vail (incumbent)		%
Democratic	Vincent Tocci		%
Total votes			%

=== District 53 ===
Connecticut's 53rd House of Representatives district election, 2026
Party	Candidate	Votes	%
Republican	Tammy Nuccio (incumbent)		%
Democratic	Michelle Cunningham		%
Total votes			%

=== District 54 ===
Connecticut's 54th House of Representatives district election, 2026
Party	Candidate	Votes	%
Democratic	Gregory Haddad (incumbent)		%
Total votes			%

=== District 55 ===
Connecticut's 55th House of Representatives district election, 2026
Party	Candidate	Votes	%
Republican	Steve Weir (incumbent)		%
Democratic	Ellen Paul		%
Total votes			%

=== District 56 ===
Connecticut's 56th House of Representatives district election, 2026
Party	Candidate	Votes	%
Democratic	Kevin Brown (incumbent)		%
Republican	Andy Tedford		%
Total votes			%

=== District 57 ===
Connecticut's 57th House of Representatives district election, 2026
Party	Candidate	Votes	%
Democratic	Jaime Foster (incumbent)		%
Total votes			%

=== District 58 ===
On July 30th, the Connecticut Supreme Court ruled that Tom Tyler would be allowed back on the primary ballot after a lower-court ruling had disqualified him. Due to the Supreme Court's ruling, the primary election for this district has been postponed to September 1st so that new ballots can be printed.

Connecticut's 58th House of Representatives district primary election, 2026
Party	Candidate	Votes	%
Democratic	John Santanella (incumbent)	878	83%
Democratic	Tom Tyler	174	17%
Total votes		1,052	100%

Connecticut's 58th House of Representatives district election, 2026
Party	Candidate	Votes	%
Democratic	John Santanella (incumbent)		%
Republican	Marie Pyznar		%
Total votes			%

=== District 59 ===
Connecticut's 59th House of Representatives district election, 2026
Party	Candidate	Votes	%
Republican	Carol Hall (incumbent)		%
Democratic	Rick LeBorious		%
Total votes			%

=== District 60 ===
Connecticut's 60th House of Representatives district election, 2026
Party	Candidate	Votes	%
Democratic	Jane Garibay (incumbent)		%
Republican	Chantelle Ankerman		%
Total votes			%

=== District 61 ===
Connecticut's 61st House of Representatives district election, 2026
Party	Candidate	Votes	%
Republican	Tami Zawistowski (incumbent)		%
Democratic	James Mol		%
Total votes			%

=== District 62 ===
Connecticut's 62nd House of Representatives district election, 2026
Party	Candidate	Votes	%
Republican	Mark Anderson (incumbent)		%
Democratic	Kim Becker		%
Total votes			%

=== District 63 ===
Connecticut's 63rd House of Representatives district election, 2026
Party	Candidate	Votes	%
Republican	Jay Case (incumbent)		%
Democratic	Caitlin Hall		%
Total votes			%

=== District 64 ===
Connecticut's 64th House of Representatives district election, 2026
Party	Candidate	Votes	%
Democratic	Maria Horn (incumbent)		%
Republican	Katelynn Borraiz		%
Total votes			%

=== District 65 ===
Connecticut's 65th House of Representatives district election, 2026
Party	Candidate	Votes	%
Republican	Joe Canino (incumbent)		%
Democratic	Edward Corey		%
Total votes			%

=== District 66 ===
Connecticut's 66th House of Representatives district election, 2026
Party	Candidate	Votes	%
Republican	Karen Reddington-Hughes (incumbent)		%
Democratic	Suzanne Lovig		%
Total votes			%

=== District 67 ===
Connecticut's 67th House of Representatives district election, 2026
Party	Candidate	Votes	%
Republican	Bill Buckbee (incumbent)		%
Democratic	Alexandra Thomas		%
Total votes			%

=== District 68 ===
Connecticut's 68th House of Representatives district election, 2026
Party	Candidate	Votes	%
Republican	Joseph Polletta (incumbent)		%
Total votes			%

=== District 69 ===
Connecticut's 69th House of Representatives district election, 2026
Party	Candidate	Votes	%
Republican	Jason Buchsbaum (incumbent)		%
Total votes			%

=== District 70 ===
Connecticut's 70th House of Representatives district election, 2026
Party	Candidate	Votes	%
Republican	Seth Bronko (incumbent)		%
Democratic	Jeff Litke		%
Total votes			%

=== District 71 ===
August 11, 2026 Primary
Party	Candidate	Votes	%
Republican	William Pizzuto (incumbent)	580	64.9%
Republican	Michael Grosso	314	35.1
Total votes		894	100%

Connecticut's 71st House of Representatives district election, 2026
Party	Candidate	Votes	%
Republican	William Pizzuto (incumbent)		%
Democratic	Stephen Farrucci III		%
Total votes			%

=== District 72 ===
Connecticut's 72nd House of Representatives district election, 2026
Party	Candidate	Votes	%
Democratic	Larry Butler (incumbent)		%
Total votes			%

=== District 73 ===
Connecticut's 73rd House of Representatives district election, 2026
Party	Candidate	Votes	%
Democratic	Ronald Napoli Jr.		%
Republican	Terence Lott Sr.		%
Total votes			%

=== District 74 ===
Connecticut's 74th House of Representatives district election, 2026
Party	Candidate	Votes	%
Democratic	Michael DiGiovancarlo (incumbent)		%
Republican	Ollie Gray III		%
Total votes			%

=== District 75 ===
Connecticut's 75th House of Representatives district election, 2026
Party	Candidate	Votes	%
Democratic	Geraldo Reyes (incumbent)		%
Republican	Faithalee Goclowski		%
Total votes			%

=== District 76 ===
Connecticut's 76th House of Representatives district election, 2026
Party	Candidate	Votes	%
Republican	John Piscopo (incumbent)		%
Democratic	Jennifer Davis		%
Total votes			%

=== District 77 ===
Connecticut's 77th House of Representatives district election, 2026
Party	Candidate	Votes	%
Republican	Cara Pavalock-D'Amato (incumbent)		%
Democratic	DeWayne Wynn Jr.		%
Total votes			%

=== District 78 ===
Connecticut's 78th House of Representatives district election, 2026
Party	Candidate	Votes	%
Republican	Joe Hoxha (incumbent)		%
Democratic	Sean Moore		%
Total votes			%

=== District 79 ===
Connecticut's 79th House of Representatives district election, 2026
Party	Candidate	Votes	%
Democratic	Mary Fortier (incumbent)		%
Republican	Cheryl Thibeault		%
Total votes			%

=== District 80 ===
Connecticut's 80th House of Representatives district election, 2026
Party	Candidate	Votes	%
Republican	Gale Mastrofrancesco (incumbent))		%
Democratic	Cheryl Hilton		%
Total votes			%

=== District 81 ===
Connecticut's 81st House of Representatives district election, 2026
Party	Candidate	Votes	%
Democratic	Chris Poulos (incumbent)		%
Republican	Timothy Wilk		%
Total votes			%

=== District 82 ===
Connecticut's 82nd House of Representatives district election, 2026
Party	Candidate	Votes	%
Democratic	Michael Quinn (incumbent)		%
Total votes			%

=== District 83 ===
Connecticut's 83rd House of Representatives district election, 2026
Party	Candidate	Votes	%
Democratic	Chad Cardillo		%
Republican	Bob Ham		%
Total votes			%

=== District 84 ===
Connecticut's 84th House of Representatives district election, 2026
Party	Candidate	Votes	%
Democratic	Hilda Santiago (incumbent)		%
Total votes			%

=== District 85 ===
Connecticut's 85th House of Representatives district election, 2026
Party	Candidate	Votes	%
Democratic	Samuel Carmody		%
Republican	Tom Laffin		%
Total votes			%

=== District 86 ===
Connecticut's 86th House of Representatives district election, 2026
Party	Candidate	Votes	%
Republican	Vincent Candelora (incumbent)		%
Total votes			%

=== District 87 ===
Connecticut's 87th House of Representatives district election, 2026
Party	Candidate	Votes	%
Republican	Dave Yaccarino (incumbent)		%
Democratic	Kathleen Kimball		%
Total votes			%

=== District 88 ===
Connecticut's 88th House of Representatives district election, 2026
Party	Candidate	Votes	%
Democratic	Josh Elliott (incumbent)		%
Republican	Hudson Molinari		%
Total votes			%

=== District 89 ===
Connecticut's 142nd House of Representatives district election, 2026
Party	Candidate	Votes	%
Republican	Lezlye Zupkus (incumbent)		%
Total votes			%

=== District 90 ===
Connecticut's 90th House of Representatives district election, 2026
Party	Candidate	Votes	%
Republican	Craig Fishbein (incumbent)		%
Democratic	David Fritz		%
Total votes			%

=== District 91 ===
Connecticut's 91st House of Representatives district election, 2026
Party	Candidate	Votes	%
Democratic	Laurie Sweet (incumbent)		%
Total votes			%

=== District 92 ===
Democratic primary
Party	Candidate	Votes	%
Democratic	Eli Sabin	1,263	44.3%
Democratic	Patricia Dillon (incumbent)	1,018	35.7%
Democratic	Justin Farmer	570	20.0%
Total votes		2,851	100%

Connecticut's 92nd House of Representatives district election, 2026
Party	Candidate	Votes	%
Democratic	Eli Sabin		%
Total votes			%

=== District 93 ===
Connecticut's 93rd House of Representatives district election, 2026
Party	Candidate	Votes	%
Democratic	Toni Walker (incumbent)		%
Total votes			%

=== District 94 ===
Connecticut's 94th House of Representatives district election, 2026
Party	Candidate	Votes	%
Democratic	Steven Winter (incumbent)		%
Total votes			%

=== District 95 ===
Connecticut's 95th House of Representatives district election, 2026
Party	Candidate	Votes	%
Democratic	Juan Candelaria (incumbent)		%
Total votes			%

=== District 96 ===
Connecticut's 96th House of Representatives district election, 2026
Party	Candidate	Votes	%
Democratic	Roland Lemar (incumbent)		%
Total votes			%

=== District 97 ===
Democratic primary
Party	Candidate	Votes	%
Democratic	Wildaliz Bermudez	905	53.6%
Democratic	Leland Moore	783	46.4%
Total votes		1,688	100%

Connecticut's 97th House of Representatives district election, 2026
Party	Candidate	Votes	%
Democratic	Wildaliz Bermudez		%
Republican	Kimberely DeMayo		%
Total votes			%

=== District 98 ===
Connecticut's 98th House of Representatives district election, 2026
Party	Candidate	Votes	%
Democratic	Moira Rader (incumbent)		%
Republican	Carlyle Ciccone		%
Total votes			%

=== District 99 ===
Connecticut's 99th House of Representatives district election, 2026
Party	Candidate	Votes	%
Republican	Joseph Zullo (incumbent)		%
Democratic	Karen Martin		%
Total votes			%

=== District 100 ===
Connecticut's 100th House of Representatives district election, 2026
Party	Candidate	Votes	%
Democratic	Kai Juanna Belton (incumbent)		%
Republican	Susan Manke		%
Total votes			%

=== District 101 ===
Connecticut's 101st House of Representatives district election, 2026
Party	Candidate	Votes	%
Democratic	John-Michael Parker (incumbent)		%
Republican	Mary Ann Connelly		%
Total votes			%

=== District 102 ===
Connecticut's 102nd House of Representatives district election, 2026
Party	Candidate	Votes	%
Democratic	Robin Comey (incumbent)		%
Republican	Paul Crisci		%
Total votes			%

=== District 103 ===
Connecticut's 103rd House of Representatives district election, 2026
Party	Candidate	Votes	%
Democratic	Liz Linehan (incumbent)		%
Republican	Jeff Weiss		%
Total votes			%

=== District 104 ===
Connecticut's 104th House of Representatives district election, 2026
Party	Candidate	Votes	%
Democratic	Kara Rochelle (incumbent)		%
Republican	Daniel Sexton		%
Total votes			%

=== District 105 ===
Connecticut's 105h House of Representatives district election, 2026
Party	Candidate	Votes	%
Republican	Nicole Klarides-Ditria (incumbent)		%
Democratic	Josh Beaupre		%
Total votes			%

=== District 106 ===
Connecticut's 106th House of Representatives district election, 2026
Party	Candidate	Votes	%
Republican	Mitch Bolinsky (incumbent)		%
Democratic	Michelle Embree Ku		%
Total votes			%

=== District 107 ===
Connecticut's 107th House of Representatives district election, 2026
Party	Candidate	Votes	%
Republican	Marty Foncello (incumbent)		%
Democratic	Julie Kerton		%
Total votes			%

=== District 108 ===
Connecticut's 108th House of Representatives district election, 2026
Party	Candidate	Votes	%
Republican	Pat Callahan (incumbent)		%
Democratic	Anne Weisberg		%
Total votes			%

=== District 109 ===
Connecticut's 109th House of Representatives district election, 2026
Party	Candidate	Votes	%
Democratic	Farley Santos (incumbent)		%
Republican	Ed Vachovetz		%
Total votes			%

=== District 110 ===
Connecticut's 110th House of Representatives district election, 2026
Party	Candidate	Votes	%
Democratic	Bob Godfrey (incumbent)		%
Republican	Anthony Rongetti		%
Total votes			%

=== District 111 ===
Connecticut's 111th House of Representatives district election, 2026
Party	Candidate	Votes	%
Democratic	Aimee Berger-Girvalo (incumbent)		%
Republican	Blake Consentino		%
Total votes			%

=== District 112 ===
Connecticut's 112th House of Representatives district election, 2026
Party	Candidate	Votes	%
Republican	Tony Scott (incumbent)		%
Democratic	Wiley Mullins		%
Total votes			%

=== District 113 ===
Connecticut's 113th House of Representatives district election, 2026
Party	Candidate	Votes	%
Republican	Joe Lauretti		%
Democratic	Bryan Lizotte		%
Total votes			%

=== District 114 ===
Connecticut's 114th House of Representatives district election, 2026
Party	Candidate	Votes	%
Democratic	Mary Welander (incumbent)		%
Republican	Brooke Hopkins		%
Total votes			%

=== District 115 ===
Connecticut's 115th House of Representatives district election, 2026
Party	Candidate	Votes	%
Democratic	William Heffernan III (incumbent)		%
Republican	Victor Borras		%
Total votes			%

=== District 116 ===
Connecticut's 116th House of Representatives district election, 2026
Party	Candidate	Votes	%
Democratic	Trenee McGee (incumbent)		%
Total votes			%

=== District 117 ===
Connecticut's 117th House of Representatives district election, 2026
Party	Candidate	Votes	%
Democratic	MJ Shannon (incumbent)		%
Republican	Raymond Collins III		%
Total votes			%

=== District 118 ===
Connecticut's 118th House of Representatives district primary election, 2026
Party	Candidate	Votes	%
Democratic	Toni Lombardi	1,129	72.9%
Democratic	Christopher Saley	419	27.1%
Total votes		1,548	100%

Connecticut's 118th House of Representatives district election, 2026
Party	Candidate	Votes	%
Democratic	Toni Lombardi		%
Republican	Steve Visconti		%
Total votes			%

=== District 119 ===
Connecticut's 119th House of Representatives district election, 2026
Party	Candidate	Votes	%
Republican	Kathy Kennedy (incumbent)		%
Democratic	Alex Armstrong		%
Total votes			%

=== District 120 ===
Connecticut's 120th House of Representatives district election, 2026
Party	Candidate	Votes	%
Democratic	Kaitlyn Shake (incumbent)		%
Republican	Troy Gargiulo		%
Total votes			%

=== District 121 ===
Connecticut's 121st House of Representatives district election, 2026
Party	Candidate	Votes	%
Democratic	Joe Gresko (incumbent)		%
Republican	Rafael Irizarry		%
Total votes			%

=== District 122 ===
Connecticut's 122nd House of Representatives district election, 2026
Party	Candidate	Votes	%
Republican	Ben McGorty (incumbent)		%
Democratic	Mandy Kilmartin		%
Total votes			%

=== District 123 ===
Connecticut's 123rd House of Representatives district election, 2026
Party	Candidate	Votes	%
Republican	David Rutigliano (incumbent)		%
Democratic	Bill Mecca		%
Total votes			%

=== District 124 ===
Connecticut's 124th House of Representatives district election, 2026
Party	Candidate	Votes	%
Democratic	Andre Baker (incumbent)		%
Total votes			%

=== District 125 ===
Connecticut's 125th House of Representatives district election, 2026
Party	Candidate	Votes	%
Republican	Tom O'Dea (incumbent)		%
Democratic	Meredith Tobitsch		%
Total votes			%

=== District 126 ===
Connecticut's 126th House of Representatives district election, 2026
Party	Candidate	Votes	%
Democratic	Fred Gee (incumbent)		%
Total votes			%

=== District 127 ===
Connecticut's 127th House of Representatives district election, 2026
Party	Candidate	Votes	%
Democratic	Marcus Brown (incumbent)		%
Total votes			%

=== District 128 ===
Connecticut's 128th House of Representatives district election, 2026
Party	Candidate	Votes	%
Democratic	Christopher Rosario (incumbent)		%
Total votes			%

=== District 129 ===
Connecticut's 129th House of Representatives district election, 2026
Party	Candidate	Votes	%
Democratic	Steven Stafstrom (incumbent)		%
Total votes			%

=== District 130 ===
Connecticut's 130th House of Representatives district election, 2026
Party	Candidate	Votes	%
Democratic	Antonio Felipe (incumbent)		%
Total votes			%

=== District 131 ===
Connecticut's 131st House of Representatives district election, 2026
Party	Candidate	Votes	%
Republican	Arnold Jensen (incumbent)		%
Democratic	Heather Stafford		%
Total votes			%

=== District 132 ===
Connecticut's 132nd House of Representatives district election, 2026
Party	Candidate	Votes	%
Democratic	Jennifer Leeper (incumbent)		%
Republican	Carol Pontrelli		%
Total votes			%

=== District 133 ===
Connecticut's 133rd House of Representatives district election, 2026
Party	Candidate	Votes	%
Democratic	Cristin McCarthy Vahey (incumbent)		%
Republican	Lisa Miro		%
Total votes			%

=== District 134 ===
Connecticut's 134th House of Representatives district election, 2026
Party	Candidate	Votes	%
Democratic	Sarah Keitt (incumbent)		%
Republican	Ken Astarita		%
Total votes			%

=== District 135 ===
Connecticut's 135th House of Representatives district election, 2026
Party	Candidate	Votes	%
Democratic	Anne Hughes (incumbent)		%
Republican	Darrell Harris		%
Total votes			%

=== District 136 ===
Connecticut's 136th House of Representatives district election, 2026
Party	Candidate	Votes	%
Democratic	Lee Goldstein		%
Republican	Douglas Ouellette		%
Total votes			%

=== District 137 ===
Connecticut's 137th House of Representatives district election, 2026
Party	Candidate	Votes	%
Democratic	Kadeem Roberts (incumbent)		%
Republican	Tricia Ciccone		%
Total votes			%

=== District 138 ===
Connecticut's 138th House of Representatives district election, 2026
Party	Candidate	Votes	%
Democratic	Kenneth Gucker (incumbent)		%
Republican	Irving Fox		%
Total votes			%

=== District 139 ===
Connecticut's 139th House of Representatives district election, 2026
Party	Candidate	Votes	%
Democratic	Larry Pemberton (incumbent)		%
Republican	Brandon Sabbag		%
Total votes			%

=== District 140 ===
Connecticut's 140th House of Representatives district election, 2026
Party	Candidate	Votes	%
Democratic	Travis Simms (incumbent)		%
Republican	Enrique Santiago		%
Total votes			%

=== District 141 ===
Connecticut's 141st House of Representatives district election, 2026
Party	Candidate	Votes	%
Republican	Tracy Marra (incumbent)		%
Democratic	Erika Procaccini		%
Total votes			%

=== District 142 ===
Previously, incumbent State Representative Lucy Dathan sought the Democratic nomination for the 26th Senate district held by retiring State Senator Ceci Maher. However, she lost the Democratic endorsement for the district to Samantha Nestor, the First Selectwoman of Weston. Dathan soon withdrew and ran for re-election to her state house seat.

Jack Pavia and Tina Duryea, the two Democratic candidates who initially ran to succeed Dathan, immediately dropped out and endorsed her for re-election.

Connecticut's 142nd House of Representatives district election, 2026
Party	Candidate	Votes	%
Democratic	Lucy Dathan (incumbent)		%
Republican	Donald Mastronardi		%
Total votes			%

=== District 143 ===
Connecticut's 143rd House of Representatives district election, 2026
Party	Candidate	Votes	%
Democratic	Dominique Johnson (incumbent)		%
Republican	Greg Helms		%
Total votes			%

=== District 144 ===
Connecticut's 144th House of Representatives district election, 2026
Party	Candidate	Votes	%
Democratic	Hubert Delany (incumbent)		%
Republican	Layne Rodney		%
Total votes			%

=== District 145 ===
Connecticut's 145th House of Representatives district election, 2026
Party	Candidate	Votes	%
Democratic	Corey Paris (incumbent)		%
Republican	Andrew Krill		%
Total votes			%

=== District 146 ===
Connecticut's 142nd House of Representatives district election, 2026
Party	Candidate	Votes	%
Democratic	Eilish Collins Main (incumbent)		%
Total votes			%

=== District 147 ===
Connecticut's 147th House of Representatives district election, 2026
Party	Candidate	Votes	%
Democratic	Matt Blumenthal (incumbent)		%
Republican	Carola Cammann		%
Total votes			%

=== District 148 ===
Connecticut's 148th House of Representatives district election, 2026
Party	Candidate	Votes	%
Democratic	Jonathan Jacobson (incumbent)		%
Republican	Ensly Maizo		%
Total votes			%

=== District 149 ===
Connecticut's 149th House of Representatives district election, 2026
Party	Candidate	Votes	%
Republican	Tina Courpas (incumbent)		%
Democratic	Amiel Goldberg		%
Total votes			%

=== District 150 ===
Connecticut's 150th House of Representatives district election, 2026
Party	Candidate	Votes	%
Democratic	Steve Meskers (incumbent)		%
Republican	Jonathan Goldstein		%
Total votes			%

=== District 151 ===
Connecticut's 151st House of Representatives district election, 2026
Party	Candidate	Votes	%
Democratic	Hector Arzeno (incumbent)		%
Republican	Michael Mason		%
Total votes			%

== Analysis ==
The Connecticut GOP won just 36 of the Connecticut State House's 151 seats, its worst result since the post-Watergate midterms of 1974. Connecticut State Senate Majority Leader Bob Duff said the Connecticut Democrats' success was due to more than just the 2026 blue wave. This characterization was disputed by Connecticut Republican Party Chair Ben Proto, who said the results had "absolutely nothing to do with me or Vin or Steve and the state of the Republican Party in Connecticut", referencing Republicans' Connecticut State House of Representatives and State Senate leaders, respectively.

The results prompted some conservatives in Connecticut to call for Ben Proto to resign as the Chair of the Connecticut Republican Party. The Hartford Courant reported that "Facebook had numerous memes Wednesday calling for GOP State Chairman Ben Proto to step down, but he had promised Tuesday morning that he'll stay through the middle of next year". On one of WTNH News 8's programs, a Connecticut Republican strategist called for Ben Proto to resign, saying "he has been Chair for long enough".
