= 2010 Connecticut House of Representatives election =

- November 2, 2010

All 151 seats in the Connecticut House of Representatives 76 seats needed for a majority
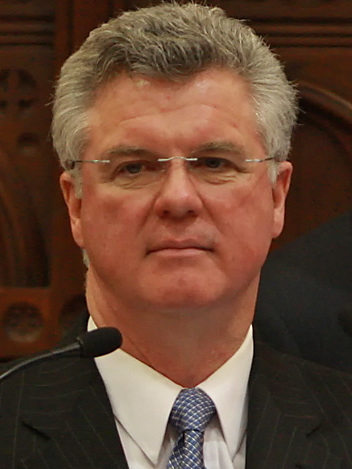

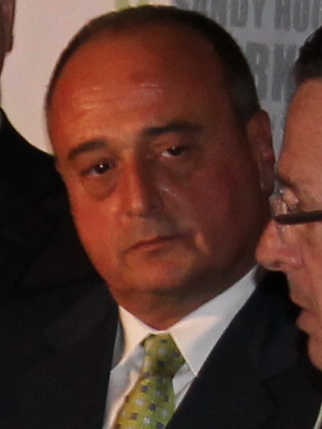
	Majority party	Minority party
Leader	Christopher Donovan	Lawrence Cafero
Party	Democratic	Republican
Leader's seat	84th district	142nd district
Seats before	114	37
Seats won	100	51
Seat change	▼14	▲14
- Results: Republican gain Democratic hold Republican hold
Speaker before election
Christopher Donovan
Democratic
Elected Speaker
Christopher Donovan
Democratic

The 2010 Connecticut House of Representatives election was held on Tuesday, November 2, 2010, to elect members to the Connecticut House of Representatives, one from each of the state's 151 General Assembly districts. The date of this the election corresponded with other elections in the state, including ones for governor, U.S. Senate, and the Connecticut State Senate. Representatives elected served a two-year term which began in January 2011.

== Predictions ==
Source	Ranking	As of
Governing	Safe D	November 1, 2010

== Overview ==
As of February 11, 2010, the Connecticut House of Representatives comprised 114 Democrats and 37 Republicans.

District	Name	Party	Hometown	First elected	Towns Represented
1	Kenneth Green	Democratic	Hartford	1994	Hartford (part), Bloomfield (part)
2	Jason Bartlett	Democratic	Bethel	2006	Bethel (part), Danbury (part), Redding (part)
3	Minnie Gonzalez	Democratic	Hartford	1996	Hartford (part)
4	Kevin Roldan	Democratic	Hartford	2006	Hartford (part)
5	Marie Lopez Kirkley-Bey	Democratic	Hartford	1994	Hartford (part)
6	Hector Robles	Democratic	Hartford	1996	Hartford (part)
7	Douglas McCrory	Democratic	Hartford	2004	Hartford (part)
8	Joan Lewis	Democratic	Coventry	2002	Columbia, Coventry, Vernon (part)
9	Jason Rojas	Democratic	East Hartford	2008	East Hartford (part), Glastonbury (part), Manchester (part)
10	Henry Genga	Democratic	East Hartford	2006	East Hartford (part)
11	Tim Larson	Democratic	East Hartford	2008	East Hartford (part), South Windsor (part)
12	Ryan Barry	Democratic	Manchester	2002	Manchester (part)
13	John Thompson	Democratic	Manchester	1986	Manchester (part)
14	Bill Aman	Republican	South Windsor	2004	South Windsor (part)
15	Dave Baram	Democratic	Bloomfield	2009	Bloomfield (part), Windsor (part)
16	Linda Schofield	Democratic	Simsbury	2006	Simsbury
17	Timothy LeGeyt	Republican	Canton	2008	Avon (part), Canton
18	Andrew Fleischmann	Democratic	West Hartford	1994	West Hartford (part)
19	Beth Bye	Democratic	West Hartford	2006	Avon (part), Farmington (part), West Hartford (part)
20	David McCluskey	Democratic	West Hartford	1998	West Hartford (part)
21	Demetrios Giannaros	Democratic	Farmington	1994	Farmington (part)
22	Betty Boukus	Democratic	Plainville	1994	Bristol (part), New Britain (part), Plainville
23	Marilyn Giuliano	Republican	Old Saybrook	2002	Lyme, Old Lyme, Old Saybrook (part), Westbrook (part)
24	Tim O'Brien	Democratic	New Britain	2002	New Britain (part), Newington (part)
25	John Geragosian	Democratic	New Britain	1994	New Britain (part)
26	Peter Tercyak	Democratic	New Britain	2003	New Britain (part)
27	Sandy Nafis	Democratic	Newington	1998	Newington (part)
28	Russell Morin	Democratic	Wethersfield	2006	Wethersfield (part)
29	Antonio Guerrera	Democratic	Rocky Hill	2001	Newington (part), Rocky Hill, Wethersfield (part)
30	Joe Aresimowicz	Democratic	Berlin	2004	Berlin (part), Southington (part)
31	Thomas Kehoe	Democratic	Glastonbury	2006	Glastonbury (part)
32	Jim O'Rourke	Democratic	Cromwell	1991	Cromwell, Middletown (part), Portland
33	Joseph Serra	Democratic	Middletown	1992	Middletown (part)
34	Gail Hamm	Democratic	East Hampton	1998	East Hampton, Middletown (part)
35	Brian O'Connor	Democratic	Westbrook	2000	Clinton (part), Killingworth, Westbrook (part)
36	James Field Spallone	Democratic	Essex	2000	Chester, Deep River, Essex, Haddam
37	Ed Jutila	Democratic	Niantic	2004	East Lyme, Salem
38	Elizabeth Ritter	Democratic	Waterford	2004	Montville (part), Waterford
39	Ernest Hewett	Democratic	New London	2004	New London (part)
40	Edward Moukawsher	Democratic	Groton	2002	Groton (part), New London (part)
41	Elissa Wright	Democratic	Groton	2006	Groton (part)
42	Tom Reynolds	Democratic	Ledyard	2004	Ledyard, Montville (part), Preston
43	Diana Urban	Democratic	North Stonington	2000	North Stonington, Stonington
44	Mae Flexer	Democratic	Killingly	2008	Killingly (part), Plainfield (part), Sterling
45	Steve Mikutel	Democratic	Griswold	1992	Griswold, Lisbon, Plainfield (part), Voluntown
46	Melissa Olson	Democratic	Norwich	2002	Norwich (part)
47	Christopher Coutu	Republican	Norwich	2008	Canterbury, Norwich (part), Scotland, Sprague
48	Linda Orange	Democratic	Colchester	1996	Colchester, East Hampton
49	Susan Johnson	Democratic	Windham	2008	Windham
50	Mike Alberts	Republican	Woodstock	2004	Brooklyn, Eastford, Hampton, Pomfret, Woodstock
51	Shawn Johnston	Democratic	Putnam	1994	Killingly (part), Putnam, Thompson
52	Penny Bacchiochi	Republican	Somers	2002	Somers, Stafford, Union
53	Bryan Hurlburt	Democratic	Tolland	2006	Ashford, Tolland, Willington
54	Denise W. Merrill	Democratic	Mansfield Center	1994	Chaplin, Mansfield
55	Pamela Sawyer	Republican	Bolton	1992	Andover, Bolton, Hebron, Marlborough
56	Claire Janowski	Democratic	Vernon	2000	Vernon (part)
57	Ted Graziani	Democratic	Ellington	1998	East Windsor, Ellington
58	Kathleen Tallarita	Democratic	Enfield	1998	Enfield (part)
59	Karen Jarmoc	Democratic	Enfield	2006	Enfield (part)
60	Peggy Sayers	Democratic	Windsor Locks	1998	Windsor (part), Windsor Locks
61	Matthew Conway	Democratic	Suffield	2008	East Granby (part), Suffield, Windsor (part)
62	Annie Hornish	Democratic	Granby	2008	Barkhamsted (part), East Granby (part), Granby, New Hartford
63	John Rigby	Republican	Colebrook	2002	Barkhamsted (part), Canaan, Colebrook, Hartland, Norfolk, North Canaan, Winchester
64	Roberta Willis	Democratic	Salisbury	2000	Cornwall, Goshen, Salisbury, Sharon, Torrington (part)
65	Michelle Cook	Democratic	Torrington	2008	Torrington (part)
66	Craig Miner	Republican	Litchfield	2000	Bethlehem, Litchfield (part), Morris, Warren, Woodbury (part)
67	Clark Chapin	Republican	New Milford	2000	New Milford (part)
68	Sean Williams	Republican	Watertown	2003	Watertown, Woodbury (part)
69	Arthur O'Neill	Republican	Southbury	1988	Bridgewater, Roxbury, Southbury (part), Washington
70	Rosa Rebimbas	Republican	Naugatuck	2009	Naugatuck (part)
71	Anthony D'Amelio	Republican	Waterbury	1996	Middlebury, Waterbury (part)
72	Larry Butler	Democratic	Waterbury	2006	Waterbury (part)
73	Jeffrey J. Berger	Democratic	Waterbury	2000	Waterbury (part)
74	Selim Noujaim	Republican	Waterbury	2002	Waterbury (part)
75	David Aldarondo	Democratic	Waterbury	2004	Waterbury (part)
76	John Piscopo	Republican	Thomaston	1988	Burlington, Harwinton, Litchfield (part), Thomaston
77	Christopher Wright	Democratic	Bristol	2008	Bristol (part)
78	William Hamzy	Republican	Terryville	1994	Bristol (part), Plymouth
79	Frank Nicastro, Sr.	Democratic	Bristol	2006	Bristol (part)
80	John "Corky" Mazurek	Democratic	Wolcott	2002	Wolcott, Southington (part)
81	Bruce Zalaski	Democratic	Southington	2002	Southington (part)
82	Emil Altobello	Democratic	Meriden	1994	Meriden (part)
83	Catherine Abercrombie	Democratic	Meriden	2005	Berlin (part), Meriden (part)
84	Christopher G. Donovan	Democratic	Meriden	1992	Meriden (part)
85	Mary Mushinsky	Democratic	Wallingford	1980	Wallingford (part)
86	Vincent Candelora	Republican	North Branford	2006	East Haven (part), North Branford, Wallingford (part)
87	Steve Fontana	Democratic	North Haven	1994	North Haven
88	Brendan Sharkey	Democratic	Hamden	2000	Hamden (part)
89	Vickie Orsini Nardello	Democratic	Prospect	1994	Bethany, Cheshire (part), Prospect
90	Mary Fritz	Democratic	Yalesville	1986	Cheshire (part), Wallingford (part)
91	Peter Villano	Democratic	Hamden	1992	Hamden (part)
92	Patricia Dillon	Democratic	New Haven	1984	New Haven (part)
93	Toni Walker	Democratic	New Haven	2000	New Haven (part)
94	Gary Holder-Winfield	Democratic	New Haven	2008	New Haven (part)
95	Juan Candelaria	Democratic	New Haven	2002	New Haven (part)
96	Cameron Staples	Democratic	New Haven	1994	Hamden (part), New Haven (part)
97	Robert Megna	Democratic	New Haven	2000	New Haven (part)
98	Patricia Widlitz	Democratic	Guilford	1994	Branford (part), Guilford (part)
99	Michael P. Lawlor	Democratic	East Haven	1986	East Haven (part)
100	Matt Lesser	Democratic	Middletown	2008	Durham, Middlefield, Middletown (part)
101	Deborah Heinrich	Democratic	Madison	2004	Guilford (part), Madison
102	Lonnie Reed	Democratic	Branford	1996	Branford (part)
103	Elizabeth Esty	Democratic	Cheshire	2008	Cheshire (part), Hamden (part), Wallingford (part)
104	Linda Gentile	Democratic	Ansonia	2004	Ansonia (part), Derby (part)
105	Theresa Conroy	Democratic	Beacon Falls	1996	Ansonia (part), Beacon Falls, Seymour (part)
106	Christopher Lyddy	Democratic	Newtown	2008	Newtown (part)
107	David Scribner	Republican	Brookfield	1999	Bethel (part), Brookfield
108	Mary Ann Carson	Republican	New Fairfield	1998	Kent, New Fairfield (part), New Milford (part), Sherman
109	Joseph Taborsak	Democratic	Danbury	2006	Danbury (part)
110	Bob Godfrey	Democratic	Danbury	1988	Danbury (part)
111	John H. Frey	Republican	Ridgefield	1998	Ridgefield
112	DebraLee Hovey	Republican	Monroe	2002	Monroe, Newtown (part)
113	Jason Perillo	Republican	Shelton	2007	Shelton (part)
114	Themis Klarides	Republican	Derby	1998	Derby (part), Orange (part), Woodbridge (part)
115	Stephen Dargan	Democratic	West Haven	1990	West Haven (part)
116	Louis Esposito	Democratic	West Haven	1992	West Haven (part)
117	Paul Davis	Democratic	Orange	2004	Milford (part), Orange (part), West Haven (part)
118	Barbara Lambert	Democratic	Milford	2008	Milford (part)
119	Richard Roy	Democratic	Milford	1992	Milford (part)
120	John Harkins	Republican	Stratford	1996	Stratford (part)
121	Terry Backer	Democratic	Stratford	1992	Stratford (part)
122	Lawrence G. Miller	Republican	Stratford	1990	Shelton (part), Stratford (part)
123	T.R. Rowe	Republican	Trumbull	1998	Trumbull (part)
124	Charles Clemons	Democratic	Bridgeport	2003	Bridgeport (part)
125	John Hetherington	Republican	New Canaan	2002	New Canaan (part), Wilton (part)
126	Christopher Caruso	Democratic	Bridgeport	1991	Bridgeport (part)
127	Jack Hennessy	Democratic	Bridgeport	2004	Bridgeport (part)
128	Andres Ayala, Jr.	Democratic	Bridgeport	2006	Bridgeport (part)
129	Auden Grogins	Democratic	Bridgeport	2008	Bridgeport (part)
130	Ezequiel Santiago	Democratic	Bridgeport	2008	Bridgeport (part)
131	David Labriola	Republican	Naugatuck	2002	Naugatuck (part), Oxford, Southbury (part)
132	Thomas Drew	Democratic	Fairfield	2004	Fairfield (part)
133	Kim Fawcett	Democratic	Fairfield	2006	Fairfield (part), Westport (part)
134	Tony Hwang	Republican	Trumbull	2008	Fairfield (part), Trumbull (part)
135	John Stripp	Republican	Weston	1992	Easton, Redding (part), Weston
136	Joe Mioli	Democratic	Westport	2004	Westport (part)
137	Chris Perone	Democratic	Norwalk	2004	Norwalk (part)
138	Janice Giegler	Republican	Danbury	2002	Danbury (part), New Fairfield (part)
139	Kevin Ryan	Democratic	Montville	1992	Bozrah, Franklin, Lebanon, Montville (part)
140	Bruce Morris	Democratic	Norwalk	2006	Norwalk (part)
141	Terrie Wood	Republican	Darien	2008	Darien, Norwalk (part)
142	Lawrence F. Cafero	Republican	Norwalk	1992	Norwalk (part)
143	Peggy Reeves	Democratic	Wilton	2008	Norwalk (part), Wilton (part)
144	Jim Shapiro	Democratic	Stamford	2004	Stamford (part)
145	Patricia Miller	Democratic	Stamford	2008	Stamford (part)
146	Gerald Fox	Democratic	Stamford	2004	Stamford (part)
147	William Tong	Democratic	Stamford	2006	New Canaan (part), Stamford (part)
148	Carlo Leone	Democratic	Stamford	2002	Stamford (part)
149	Livvy Floren	Republican	Greenwich	2000	Greenwich (part), Stamford (part)
150	Lile Gibbons	Republican	Greenwich	2000	Greenwich (part)
151	Fred Camillo	Republican	Greenwich	2008	Greenwich (part)

== Election and results ==
Democrats lost 14 seats to Republicans. Representatives elected served a two-year term which began in January 2011, at which point the Connecticut House of Representatives comprised 99 Democrats and 52 Republicans.
