= 2025 Connecticut House of Representatives District 113 special election =

- April 22, 2025

Connecticut House of Representatives District 113
- Turnout: 17.42%
Candidate	Amy Romano	Michael Duncan
Party	Republican	Democratic
Popular vote	1,638	1,479
Percentage	52.5%	47.5%
Representative before election
Vacant
Jason Perillo until February 28, 2025
Republican
Elected Representative
Amy Romano
Republican

A special election in the U.S. state of Connecticut was held on April 22, 2025, to elect a new member to the Connecticut House of Representatives to represent District 113. The special election was called after the resignation of longtime Republican incumbent Jason Perillo following his election to the Connecticut Senate. District 113 contains part of the town of Shelton, located within the Naugatuck Valley Planning Region.

== Background and procedure ==
On February 28, 2025, Republican representative Jason Perillo resigned soon after winning a special election to the Connecticut Senate. He had held the seat since 2007. Under state law, the Governor of Connecticut is required to call a special election within 10 days of a state legislative seat becoming vacant, and the election must be held within 46 days of the call. Governor Ned Lamont called the election on March 7 and scheduled the election for April 22. This special election will not affect the balance of power in the state house, as Democrats held a 102–49 supermajority in the chamber prior to the vacancy.

=== Previous results (2007–present) ===
Year	Republicans			Democrats		
2024	Jason Perillo (i)	9,346	100.00%			
2022	Jason Perillo (i)	7,089	100.00%			
2020	Jason Perillo (i)	8,010	64.12%	Elaine Matto	4,483	35.88%
2018	Jason Perillo (i)	6,233	65.06%	Elaine Matto	3,347	34.94%
2016	Jason Perillo (i)	8,090	72.84%	Adam Heller	3,017	27.16%
2014	Jason Perillo (i)	5,695	100.00%			
2012	Jason Perillo (i)	6,574	69.46%	Elaine Matto	2,891	30.54%
2010	Jason Perillo (i)	5,130	67.47%	Elaine Matto	2,473	32.53%
2008	Jason Perillo (i)	7,847	100.00%			
2007 sp	Jason Perillo	2,107	64.59%	James Orazietti	1,155	35.41%

== Candidates ==
Political parties had until March 17 to nominate candidates for the office, as there are no primaries for special elections. Write-in candidates had until April 2 to register.

- Amy Romano, member of the Shelton Board of Education (Republican)
- Michael Duncan, member of the Shelton Water Pollution Control Authority (Democratic)

== Results ==
2025 Connecticut House of Representatives District 113 special election
Party	Candidate	Votes	%	±%
Republican	Amy Romano	1,638	52.55	−47.45%
Democratic	Michael Duncan	1,479	47.45	+47.45%
Write-in				
Total votes		3,117	100.00%	

== See also ==
- 2025 United States state legislative elections
