= Olaleye Onikuyide =

American politician

- Onikuyide in 2026

Member-elect of the Connecticut House of Representatives from the 19th district
- Assuming office January 6, 2027
- Succeeding: Tammy Exum

Personal details
- Born: 1998 (age 27–28) Hartford, Connecticut, U.S.
- Party: Democratic
- Education: University of Hartford (BA); University of Connecticut School of Law (JD)

Olaleye Onikuyide (born 1998) is an American politician and attorney who is a member-elect of the Connecticut House of Representatives, having been elected to represent the 19th district in 2026.

== Early life and education ==
Onikuyide was born in 1998 in Hartford, Connecticut. The son of Nigerian immigrants, he lived in Bloomfield before moving to West Hartford, where he attended Hall High School, graduating in 2016. He would later earn a bachelor's degree from the University of Hartford in 2020, and then graduated from the University of Connecticut School of Law in 2024.

== Career ==
After graduating from UConn Law, Onikuyide worked as a law clerk for Robert Richardson, a magistrate judge for the United States District Court for the District of Connecticut.

Onikuyide's campaign logo

In January 2026, after state representative Tammy Exum announced her retirement, Onikuyide announced his candidacy to run to succeed her in the 19th district. He focused his campaign heavily on affordability and housing issues, expressing support for "more mixed-income housing and walkable cities." After winning the Democratic nomination, he won the general election unopposed on November 3, 2026.

== Personal life ==
Onikuyide lives with his parents in West Hartford, Connecticut, doing so "by choice to save money."
