= 2025 Connecticut elections =

Elections in the U.S. state of Connecticut

Elections were held in the U.S. State of Connecticut throughout 2025 to elect municipal positions, as well as special elections for state legislative vacancies.

== State legislative ==
=== Senate District 21 ===
2025 Connecticut Senate District 21 special election
- February 25, 2025

Connecticut Senate District 21
- Turnout: 17.13% (unofficial)
Candidate	Jason Perillo	Tony Afriyie
Party	Republican	Democratic
Popular vote	6,839	5,950
Percentage	53.48%	46.52%
Results by town
Perillo:
50–60%
60–70%
Afriyie:
50–60%
Senator before election
Kevin C. Kelly
Republican
Elected Senator
Jason Perillo
Republican

A special election was held in the U.S. state of Connecticut to elect a new member for District 21 in the Connecticut Senate, representing the town of Shelton, and parts of Seymour, Monroe, and Stratford. The election filled a vacancy caused by the resignation of Republican senator Kevin C. Kelly on January 8, 2025 to take up a judicial nomination. Longtime Republican state representative from District 113 Jason Perillo was elected senator, necessitating a special election in his state house district. The election took place concurrently with a special election in House District 40.

==== Background ====
Incumbent Republican senator Kevin C. Kelly served in the Connecticut Senate representing the 21st district from 2011 to 2025. He served as minority leader from 2021 to 2024. In his last election in 2024, he was re-elected unopposed. His last contested election was in 2022, when he was re-elected with 57.3 percent of the vote against a Democratic opponent.

==== Candidates ====
Party nominees for special elections are chosen through party conventions. Political parties were required to submit names for the ballot by February 15, 2025.

- Tony Afriyie, congressional staffer and member of the Stratford Town Council (Democratic)
- Jason Perillo, member of the Connecticut House of Representatives from the 113th district (2007–present) (Republican)

==== Results ====
2025 Connecticut Senate District 21 special election (unofficial, 23 of 23 precincts reporting)
Party	Candidate	Votes	%	±%
Republican	Jason Perillo	6,839	53.47%	▼46.53
Democratic	Tony Afriyie	5,950	46.52%	N/A
Write-in		1	0.01%	N/A
Total votes		12,790	100.00%	

==== External links ====
- Elections and Voter Information (Connecticut Secretary of State)
- Connecticut's 21st State Senate district (Ballotpedia)

===== Official campaign websites =====
- Tony Afriyie (D)

=== House District 40 ===
2025 Connecticut House of Representatives District 40 special election
- February 25, 2025

Connecticut House of Representatives District 40
- Turnout: 16.27% (unofficial)
Candidate	Dan Gaiewski	Robert Boris
Party	Democratic	Republican
Alliance	Working Families
Popular vote	1,583	716
Percentage	68.86%	31.14%
Results by town
Gaiewski:
60–70%
70–80%
Representative before election
Christine Conley
Democratic
Elected Representative
Dan Gaiewski
Democratic

A special election was held in the U.S. state of Connecticut to elect a new member for District 40 in the Connecticut House of Representatives, representing parts of the towns of Groton and Ledyard in New London County. The election filled a vacancy caused by the resignation of Democratic representative Christine Conley on January 7, 2025. Dan Gaiewski, a Democratic member of the Groton Town Council, was elected representative in the special election. The election took place concurrently with a special election in Senate District 21.

==== Background ====
In 2024, incumbent Democratic representative Christine Conley won the general election in District 40 with 66.2 percent of the vote. She represented the district since 2016, and resigned from the office on January 7, 2025, to be appointed to the state Workers' Compensation Commission.

==== Candidates ====
Party nominees for special elections are chosen through party conventions. Political parties were required to submit names for the ballot by February 15, 2025.

- Dan Gaiewski, member of the Groton Town Council (Democratic, Working Families)
- Robert Boris, chairman of the Mystic Chamber Foundation (Republican)

==== Results ====
2025 Connecticut House of Representatives District 40 special election (unofficial, 5 of 5 precincts reporting)
Party	Candidate	Votes	%	±%
Democratic	Dan Gaiewski	1,518	66.03%	▲5.34%
Working Families	Dan Gaiewski	65	2.83%	▼0.20%
Total	Dan Gaiewski	1,583	68.86%	▲2.69%
Republican	Robert Boris	716	31.14%	▼2.69%
Total votes		2,299	100.00%	

==== External links ====
- Elections and Voter Information (Connecticut Secretary of State)
- Connecticut's 40th House of Representatives district (Ballotpedia)

===== Official campaign websites =====
- Dan Gaiewski (D)
- Robert Boris (R)
