= Richard Belden =

American politician (1934–2007)

Member of the Connecticut House of Representatives from the 113th district
- In office January 8, 1975 – August 20, 2007
- Preceded by: James S. Connery Sr.
- Succeeded by: Jason Perillo

Personal details
- Born: August 13, 1934 Derby, Connecticut, U.S.
- Died: August 20, 2007 (aged 73) Derby, Connecticut, U.S.
- Party: Republican

Richard Belden (August 13, 1934 – August 20, 2007) was an American politician who served in the Connecticut House of Representatives from the 113th district from 1975 until his death in 2007.

He died of a heart attack on August 20, 2007, in Derby, Connecticut, at age 73.
