= Julie Kerton =

American politician

Member-elect of the Connecticut House of Representatives from the 107th district
- Assuming office January 2027
- Succeeding: Martin Foncello

Personal details
- Party: Democratic
- Website: Campaign website

Julie Kerton is an American politician. A member of the Democratic Party, she is the member-elect for the 107th district of the Connecticut House of Representatives. She was elected at the 2026 election. She is a resident of Brookfield, Connecticut.
