= Brian Becker =

American politician from Connecticut

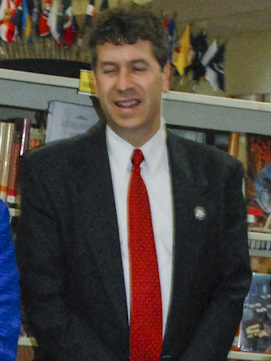

Member of the Connecticut House of Representatives from the 19th district
- In office January 2011 – January 2017
- Preceded by: Beth Bye
- Succeeded by: Derek Slap

Personal details
- Party: Democratic
- Spouse: Laura Gold Becker
- Children: Casey Becker; Cary Becker
- Education: University of Pennsylvania (B.A.); Boston University School of Law (J.D.)

Brian Becker is an American politician who was a Democratic member of the Connecticut House of Representatives, where he represented the 19th Assembly District, which consists of portions of West Hartford, Avon, and Farmington.

A graduate of Hall High School in West Hartford, Becker attended the University of Pennsylvania, where he received a bachelor's degree in economics and history while also serving as the Quaker mascot in 1984. He then went on to attend Boston University School of Law, where he earned his J.D.

Becker first ran for the Connecticut House of Representatives in 2010, when then-Representative Beth Bye declined to seek reelection and instead ran for the Connecticut State Senate. Becker defeated West Hartford Board of Education member Terry Schmitt in the August 10 Democratic primary, and went on to defeat West Hartford Town Councilor Denise Berard Hall in the general election. Becker has since been reelected in 2012 and 2014. In 2016, Becker announced his retirement from the legislature.

== Electoral history ==
Connecticut House of Representatives General Election 2014: 19th District
| Party | Candidate | Votes | % | ±% |
|---|---|---|---|---|
| Democratic | Brian Becker | 6,147 | 57.3 | |
| Republican | Mark Zydanowicz | 4,580 | 42.7 | |

Connecticut House of Representatives General Election 2012: 19th District
| Party | Candidate | Votes | % | ±% |
|---|---|---|---|---|
| Democratic | Brian Becker | 8,266 | 62.3 | |
| Republican | Jon Landry | 5,010 | 37.7 | |

Connecticut House of Representatives General Election 2010: 19th District
| Party | Candidate | Votes | % | ±% |
|---|---|---|---|---|
| Democratic | Brian Becker | 5,824 | 52.8 | |
| Republican | Denise Berard Hall | 5,203 | 47.2 | |

Connecticut House of Representatives: Democratic Primary Election 2010: 19th District
| Party | Candidate | Votes | % | ±% |
|---|---|---|---|---|
| Democratic | Brian Becker | 1,446 | 56.6 | |
| Democratic | Terry Schmitt | 1,108 | 43.4 | |
