= Carolann Reid =

American politician

Member-elect of the Connecticut State Senate from the 21st district
- Assuming office January 2027
- Succeeding: Jason Perillo

Personal details
- Party: Democratic

Carolann Reid is an American politician. A member of the Democratic Party, she is the member-elect for the 21st district of the Connecticut State Senate.
