= Bill Heughins =

American politician

Member-elect of the Connecticut House of Representatives from the 43rd district
- Assuming office January 2027
- Succeeding: Greg Howard

Personal details
- Party: Democratic
- Website: Campaign website

William (Bill) Heughins is an American politician. A member of the Democratic Party, he is the member-elect for the 43rd district of the Connecticut House of Representatives. He was elected at the 2026 election. He is a schoolteacher.
