= Kate Rotella =

American politician from Connecticut

Member of the Connecticut House of Representatives from the 43rd district
- In office January 9, 2019 – January 6, 2021
- Preceded by: Diana Urban
- Succeeded by: Greg Howard

Personal details
- Born: March 4, 1964 (age 62)
- Party: Democratic

Catherine Mary Rotella (born March 4, 1964) is an American politician who served in the Connecticut House of Representatives representing the 43rd district in New London County.

== Political career ==
=== Election ===
Rotella was elected in the general election on November 6, 2018, winning 55 percent of the vote over 45 percent of Republican candidate Shaun Mastroianna.
