= William C. Leary =

American politician (1938–2026)

Member of the Connecticut House of Representatives from the 43rd district
- In office 1967–1973
- Preceded by: Seat created
- Succeeded by: Joseph W. Marinone

Personal details
- Born: August 4, 1938 Hartford, Connecticut, U.S.
- Died: March 6, 2026 (aged 87)
- Party: Democratic
- Education: Providence College; University of Connecticut School of Law

William C. Leary (August 4, 1938 – March 6, 2026) was an American politician. A member of the Democratic Party, he served in the Connecticut House of Representatives from 1967 to 1973, representing the 43rd district.

Leary died on March 6, 2026, at the age of 87.
