= Derek Slap =

Connecticut Senator

- Slap in 2026

Member of the Connecticut State Senate from the 5th district
- Incumbent
- Assumed office March 1, 2019
- Preceded by: Beth Bye

Member of the Connecticut House of Representatives from the 19th district
- In office January 5, 2017 – February 28, 2019
- Preceded by: Brian Becker
- Succeeded by: Tammy Exum

Personal details
- Born: c.1973 (age 52–53)
- Party: Democratic
- Education: Syracuse University (BA); University of Connecticut (MBA)

Derek Slap (born c. 1973) is an American politician, journalist, and businessman. He was a member of the Connecticut House of Representatives from 2017 to 2019, serving District 19. In 2019, Slap won a special election, and has since sat in the Connecticut State Senate from District 5.

== Education ==
Slap earned a Bachelor of Arts degree in journalism and international relations at Syracuse University, followed by a Master of Business Administration at the University of Connecticut School of Business.

== Career ==
Between 1998 and 2003, he was a news anchor and reporter at WVIT. He then served as a chief of staff for Democratic Party-affiliated members of the Connecticut Senate, as well as communications director for John DeStefano Jr. In 2014, Slap joined the UConn Foundation as vice president of external relations.

=== Connecticut Legislature ===
In May 2016, Slap was nominated by the Democratic Party as its candidate for Connecticut House of Representatives District 19, after sitting legislator Brian Becker announced his retirement. Slap faced Republican Party candidate Chris Barnes in the general election. Slap retained his seat in the state house in November 2018, running unopposed. Following Beth Bye's appointment to Ned Lamont's gubernatorial administration, Slap ran for her District 5 seat in the Connecticut Senate. Slap faced Bill Wadsworth, Jeffrey Przech, and Mark Stewart Greenstein in the special election. Slap was sworn in as a state senator on March 1, 2019. Within the Connecticut Senate, Slap became the deputy majority leader. The Democratic Party endorsed Slap's 2020 bid for re-election to the state senate. Slap defeated Republican Challenger Phillip Chabot in the general election on November 3, 2020.
