= Diana Urban =

American politician

Member of the Connecticut House of Representatives from the 43rd district
- In office January 3, 2001 – January 9, 2019
- Preceded by: Rob Simmons
- Succeeded by: Kate Rotella

Personal details
- Born: April 22, 1949 (age 77)
- Party: Democratic (2006–present)
- Other political affiliations: Republican (before 2006)

Diana Urban (born April 22, 1949) is an American politician who served in the Connecticut House of Representatives from the 43rd district from 2001 to 2019.
