= Beth Bye =

American politician

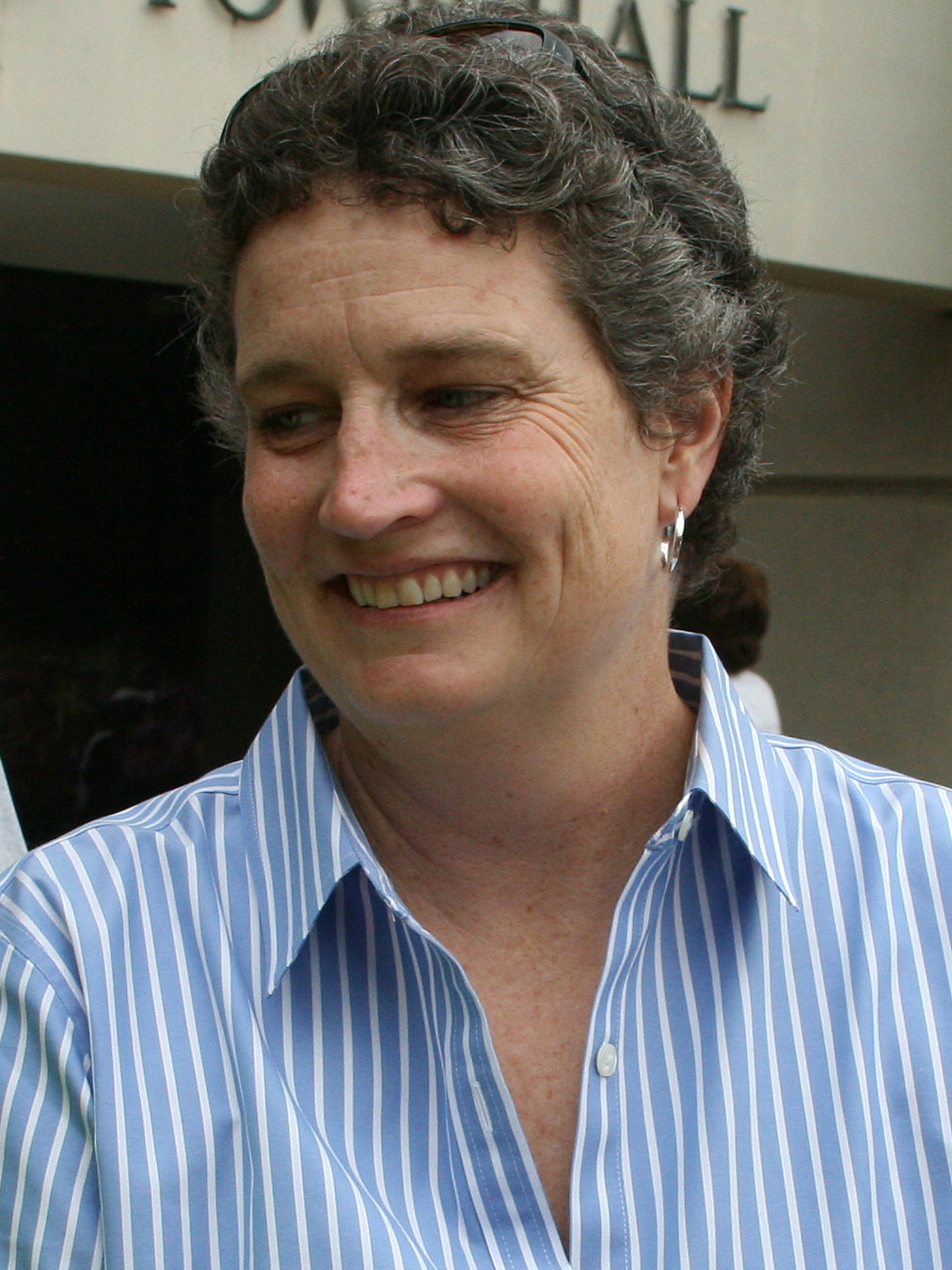

Commissioner of the Connecticut Office of Early Childhood
- In office January 9, 2019 – October 1, 2025
- Governor: Ned Lamont

Member of the Connecticut State Senate from the 5th district
- In office January 2011 – January 8, 2019
- Preceded by: Jonathan Harris
- Succeeded by: Derek Slap

Member of the Connecticut House of Representatives from the 19th district
- In office January 2007 – January 2011
- Preceded by: Bob Farr
- Succeeded by: Brian Becker

Personal details
- Born: Greenwich, Connecticut
- Party: Democratic
- Spouse: Tracey Wilson (m. 2006)

Elizabeth Bye is an American politician from Connecticut. A Democrat, she was the commissioner of the state's Office of Early Childhood from 2019 to 2025. She served as a member of the Connecticut State Senate from 2011 to 2019, representing the 5th district, which includes part of Bloomfield, most of Farmington, all of Burlington and all of West Hartford. Bye also served two terms in the Connecticut House of Representatives from 2007 to 2011.

== Early life and education ==
Bye was born and raised in Greenwich, Connecticut. She graduated from St. Mary's High School (now Trinity Catholic High School in Stamford) in Greenwich in 1980 and from the University of New Hampshire with a Master of Arts degree in child development in 1989. In 2013, Bye completed Harvard University's John F. Kennedy School of Government program for Senior Executives in State and Local Government as a David Bohnett Foundation LGBTQ Victory Institute Leadership Fellow.In 2023 she completed a 3 year Salzburg Global Seminar fellowship for international education leaders.

== Professional and political career ==
Beth Bye was appointed as Commissioner for the Connecticut Office of Early Childhood by Governor Ned Lamont in January 2019.

Bye, who served in the Senate from 2011 to the present and in the House from 2007 through 2010, will lead an office created in 2013 to coordinate and enhance various early childhood development programs and create a cohesive early care system.

In 2013, Bye led the effort to create The Office of Early Childhood, one of the first such offices in the country. Her work as champion for the creation of the office is informed by her own, long-term experience since 1980 as an early childhood professional.

Bye’s experience includes leadership positions at Auerfarm/Wintonbury Early Childhood Magnet School, Great by 8, the Capitol Region Education Council, and she also helped to open two early childhood magnet schools. Bye was the director at both the Trinity College Community Child Center and the University of St. Joseph School for Young Children, which was named the State of Connecticut model pre-school.

Commissioner Bye received her BA and MA in Child Development from the University of New Hampshire.

=== Connecticut State Legislature ===
A former Vice Chair of the West Hartford Board of Education, she was elected to the legislature in November 2006. She defeated Republican Barbara Carpenter, a member of the town council, by a margin of 57% to 43% and was therefore elected to succeed longtime Republican incumbent Bob Farr. Although the district had elected a Republican for the 26 years prior to her 2006 win, she nevertheless won re-election comfortably in 2008: Bye garnered 64% of the vote to her Republican opponent's 36%.

In May 2010, shortly after Sen. Jonathan Harris (D-West Hartford) announced that he would not run for another term in the senate in order to seek the Democratic nomination for secretary of the state, Bye declared her candidacy for his senate seat. She won the Democratic nomination unopposed and easily prevailed against a Republican opponent. She took office as a state senator on January 5, 2011. There she led the passage of several important initiatives. She worked with Students 4 a Dream and legislators from both sides of the aisle to pass both in state tuition and financial aid for undocumented immigrants. She also was Chair of the Legislature's Appropriation Committee where she and her Co-Chair, Rep. Toni Walker worked to seed funding for a CT Paid Leave system - through funding a study of the costs and payment options. As Chair of Higher Education, she brought out the Governor's Bill to establish Bioscience CT in Farmington and prevailed in a long, 8 hour debate. She also brought out the bill for transgender rights in the Senate, as well as the bill that allowed for Family Child Care workers in CT to Unionize - in collaboration with Sen. Edith Prague. She led the effort to allow communities to establish broadband and established the Office of State Broadband, working closely with Elin Katz, the Consumer Advocate, and Kevin Lembo, State Comptroller. Working with Sen. President Don Williams, Sen. Bye led an effort to establish Smart Start, a state and local program to add 600 preschool spaces in towns with Title 1 Schools.

In supporting her local West Hartford community efforts, Sen. Bye worked with Rep. Fleischmann to fund a new Charter Oak School with predominantly state dollars to establish a model magnet school. She was also able to add funding for more state funded preschool in West Hartford through School Readiness and Smart Start. She funded the initial study to support a vision for a walkable, bike-able North Main Street in Town. She secured bond funding to support the Noah Webster House and University of Saint Joseph.

In January 2019, then-incoming Governor Ned Lamont appointed Bye to lead the state Office of Early Childhood leading her to resign from the state legislature.

On October 1st, 2025, Bye retired as commissioner of the Office of Early Childhood to pursue a Master of Social Work.

== Personal life ==
A lesbian, Bye married Dr. Tracey Wilson on November 12, 2008. They were the first gay couple to be married in Connecticut. Tracey Wilson was a West Hartford town historian and the couple lived with their four children in West Hartford. Dr. Wilson died on February 23, 2025. As of 2018, Bye was one of two openly gay members of the Connecticut General Assembly, serving alongside Rep. Jeffrey Currey (D-East Hartford). Bye is the first member of the legislature to enter into a civil union.

== Electoral history ==
Connecticut House of Representatives: General Election 2006: 19th District
Party	Candidate	Votes	%
Democratic	Beth Bye	6,114	57.4
Republican	Barbara Carpenter	4,535	42.6

Connecticut House of Representatives: General Election 2008: 19th District
Party	Candidate	Votes	%
Democratic	Beth Bye	8,457	63.1
Republican	Thereas McGrath	4,936	36.9

Connecticut Senate: General Election 2010: 5th District
Party	Candidate	Votes	%
Democratic	Beth Bye	25,124	62.3
Republican	Joseph Merritt	15,182	37.7

Bye ran unopposed in both the primary and general elections in 2012.

Connecticut Senate: General Election 2014: 5th District
Party	Candidate	Votes	%
Democratic	Beth Bye	22,181	58.9
Republican	Bill Wadsworth	14,653	38.9
Independent Party	Bill Wadsworth	804	2.1
Total	Bill Wadsworth	15,457	41.1
Total votes		37,638	100

Connecticut Senate: General Election 2016: 5th District
Party	Candidate	Votes	%
Democratic	Beth Bye	30,655	60.4
Republican	Mark Merritt	20,088	39.6
