= Martin Foncello =

American politician

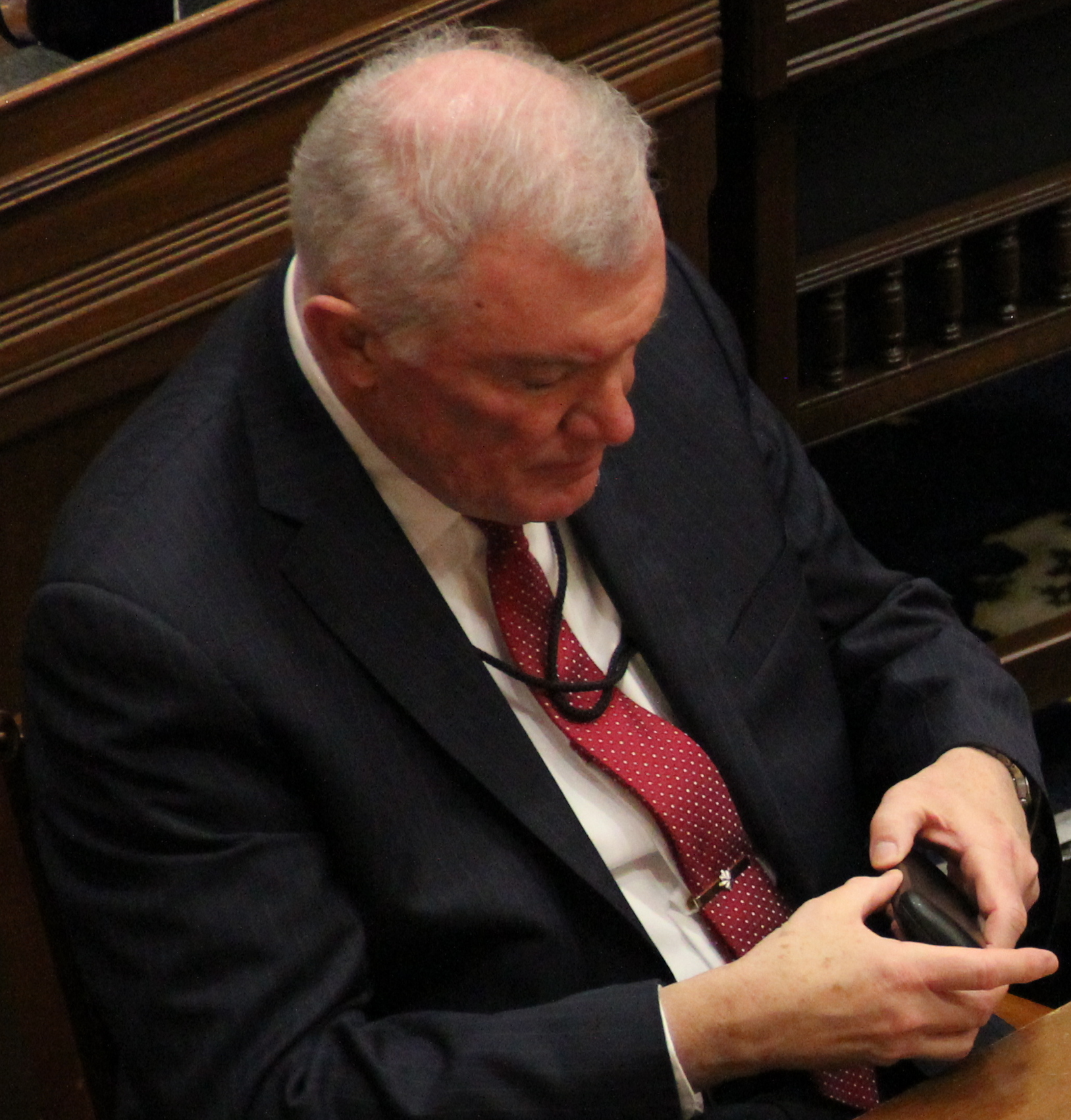
- Foncello in 2023

Member of the Connecticut House of Representatives from the 107th district
- Incumbent
- Assumed office January 4, 2023
- Preceded by: Stephen Harding
- Succeeded by: Julie Kerton (elect)

Personal details
- Party: Republican
- Education: Boston College

Martin Foncello is an American politician. He serves as a Republican member for the 107th district of the Connecticut House of Representatives.

== Life and career ==
Foncello attended Boston College and served in the United States Army.

In 2022, Foncello defeated Phoebe Holmes in the general election, winning 54 percent of the votes. He succeeded Stephen Harding. He assumed office in 2023.
