= Bob Fernandez =

American World War II veteran (1924–2024)

- Born: Robert Louie Fernandez; July 11, 1924; San Jose, California, U.S.
- Died: December 11, 2024 (aged 100); Lodi, California, U.S.
- Spouse: Mary Fernandez (died 2014)
- Children: 2
- Military career
- Allegiance: United States
- Branch: United States Navy
- Service years: 1941–1947
- Rank: Seaman First Class
- Unit: USS Curtiss (AV-4)
- Conflicts: World War II; Attack on Pearl Harbor
- Other work: Forklift driver

Robert Louie Fernandez (July 11, 1924 – December 11, 2024) was an American veteran and a survivor of the attack on Pearl Harbor.

== Biography ==
Born in San Jose, California, Fernandez enlisted in the United States Navy in August 1941 at the age of 17, and was stationed at the Pearl Harbor base on Oahu, Hawaii, west of Honolulu. He later stated that he was motivated to join the navy because he "wanted to see the world". He was stationed on the USS Curtiss (AV-4) and, according to military records, he was "a mess cook and ammunition loader".

Fernandez recalled awakening on the morning of the bombing, December 7, 1941, was "excited" to dance at the Royal Hawaiian Hotel later in the day, which was used by the United States military as a rest and recuperation center during the Second World War. While working at the mess deck, Fernandez "began hearing bangs and gunshots". He led a "battle station" several decks down, while passing ammunition to sailors on higher decks. When asked how he lived through the event, he remarked "You just do what you're told to do and do the best you can".

After leaving the Navy in 1947, Fernandez was a cannery forklift driver in San Leandro, California. His wife of 65 years, Mary, with whom he had a step-daughter and two sons, died in 2014. In 2016, Fernandez was interviewed by the History Channel for the television show Pearl Harbor: The Last Word. He had travelled to Hawaii three times to remember the attack, and had planned to visit in 2024 to commemorate the "83rd anniversary of the bombing", but was unable to due to a decline in his health. A week before his death, he did a phone interview with Associated Press.

Fernandez died on December 11, 2024, in Lodi, California, at the age of 100. He was living with his nephew at the time of his death, having been in his care since 2022 following a dementia diagnosis. Following his death, it was estimated that 16 surviving service members are still alive, as said by the organization Sons and Daughters of Pearl Harbor Survivors.
