= Greg Howard (politician) =

American politician from Connecticut

Member of the Connecticut House of Representatives from the 43rd district
- Incumbent
- Assumed office January 6, 2021
- Preceded by: Kate Rotella
- Succeeded by: Bill Heughins (elect)

Personal details
- Born: 1980 (age 45–46) Westerly, Rhode Island, U.S.
- Party: Republican
- Spouse: Shana
- Education: Community College of Rhode Island

Greg Howard (born 1980) is an American politician currently serving as a Connecticut State Representative from the 43rd district, which encompasses the towns of Stonington and North Stonington.

== Career ==
=== Connecticut House of Representatives ===
Howard, a Police Detective from the town of Stonington, was first elected to the seat in 2020. In 2021, Howard was a major proponent of a bill that would legalize online gambling in Connecticut. In the House, Howard currently serves as a member of both the Appropriations and Judiciary Committees.

=== Committees ===
- Joint Committee on Judiciary
- Education Committee
- Public Safety and Security Committee
