= Gregory Haddad =

American politician from Connecticut

Member of the Connecticut House of Representatives from the 54th district
- Incumbent
- Assumed office January 5, 2011
- Preceded by: Denise Merrill

Personal details
- Born: March 21, 1966 (age 60) Willimantic, Connecticut, U.S.
- Party: Democratic
- Spouse: Donna Becotte
- Children: Natalie Becotte Haddad
- Parent: Munere "Mooney" Haddad Karen Haddad
- Education: University of Connecticut (BS)

Gregory Haddad (born March 21, 1966) is an American politician who has served in the Connecticut House of Representatives from the 54th district since 2011. He is a Democrat who lives in and represents the town of Mansfield.

== Education and career ==
Haddad received his bachelor's degree in physics from the University of Connecticut in 1989. Prior to his election had worked as a legislative aide and assistant chief of staff for Democratic state senators for 14 years. He is a current member and past President of the Board of Directors at the Access Agency. He is a past member of the Board of Directors of Mansfield Downtown Partnership and the Discovery Depot. Haddad currently works as the Vice-Chair of the New England Board of Higher Education.

== Personal life ==
Gregory Haddad met his spouse, Donna Becotte, while attending the University of Connecticut. They got married and adopted their daughter, Natalie, in 2013.
