= Kyle Anderson =

Kyle Anderson may refer to:

- Kyle Anderson (basketball) (born 1993), American-Chinese basketball player
- Kyle Anderson (darts player) (1987–2021), Australian darts player
- Kyle Anderson (musician), vocalist for Brand of Sacrifice and ex-The Afterimage
- Kyle Anderson (singer), member of the Irish band Six
