= Amy Romano =

American politician

Member of the Connecticut House of Representatives from the 113th district
- Incumbent
- Assumed office April 25, 2025
- Preceded by: Jason Perillo
- Succeeded by: Bryan Lizotte (elect)

Personal details
- Born: 1977 (age 48–49)
- Party: Republican

Amy Romano (born 1977) is an American politician. She represents District 113 in the Connecticut House of Representatives. She was elected in 2025 in a special election.
