= Wildaliz Bermudez =

American politician

Wildaliz Bermudez is a Puerto Rican politician from Connecticut. A Democrat, she is a resident of New Haven, but for six years lived in Hartford, Connecticut and was endorsed by the Working Families Party on the Hartford City Council. She has been the Executive Director of the City of New Haven Fair Rent Commission since March 2022.

== Early life and education ==
Bermudez was born in Humacao, Puerto Rico, and when she was a toddler, her parents moved north from her home town of Yabucoa, Puerto Rico. Her father, Pedro Bermudez, was a public school teacher in Hartford Public Schools, and added his three children, Wildaliz, Pedro and Eva, as plaintiffs in the Sheff v. O'Neill education desegregation litigation.

Wildaliz then graduated from Hartford Public High School in 2000. She earned a Bachelor of Arts degree from Trinity College in 2004. She completed her master's degree at Universidad Metropolitana in Puerto Rico, which is now known as Ana G. Méndez University.

Her sister, Eva Bermudez Zimmerman, has run for multiple offices, including lieutenant governor of Connecticut in the 2018 Democratic Party primary. Her brother, Pedro, is a film director who is an assistant professor at Wesleyan University.

== Career ==
Upon completing her master's degree, Bermudez returned to Connecticut and began working in political and community organizing, including a stint as a field organizer for the 2008 political campaign of Jim Himes for Congress.

In 2014, she helped lead opposition to the construction of Dunkin' Park. After city political leaders shut anti-stadium protestors out of the process, Bermudez ran for and won a seat on Hartford City Council in 2015.

The Working Families Party was the minority party on Council, and Bermudez served as the minority leader. While serving as a part-time council member, she directed the Chispa program for the Connecticut League of Conservation Voters.

In December 2017, during her time on the council, she sponsored legislation to legalize cannabis. She used her position to help build leadership. While working on policy issues directly assisting some of the most vulnerable populations and advocating for community residents needs at large, she also introduced the successful resolution at City Council calling for the release of political prisoner Oscar López Rivera.

After Hurricane Maria, Bermudez pushed for relocation assistance for Puerto Rican refugees fleeing the destruction. She spoke at the Lincoln Memorial in November 2017's Puerto Rican Unity March.

While on City Council, she adopted policies to strengthen the Civilian Police Review Board; prevented crisis pregnancy centers from targeting residents with harmful misinformation; passed and helped fund a jobs program for homeless and formerly incarcerated persons, secured relief funds for Hurricane Maria families; created a women's summit on paid family medical leave; organized the first Latino Heritage Month ceremony in Hartford City Hall; created a housing summit in collaboration with the CT Fair Housing Center and the Community Renewal Team; provided training sessions for Hartford's boards and commissions; produced the City's first report on surveillance technology and drones; provided entrepreneurial recruitment for the Inner City Capital Connection program for small businesses in collaboration with the Hartford Foundation for Public Giving; and created an essay/arts awards contest for high school students to commemorate the abolition of slavery titled, "The December Sixth Project".

Bermudez resigned from Hartford City Council in November 2021.

In March 2022, New Haven Mayor Justin Elicker hired her as Executive Director of the Fair Rent Commission. She helped lead the creation of a statewide Fair Rent Commission Network in 2025.

== Personal life ==
Bermudez is married and has a daughter. Her husband, Ken Krayeske, is a civil rights attorney in Connecticut. She speaks Spanish.
