= Tammy Exum =

Connecticut politician

Member of the Connecticut House of Representatives from the 19th district
- Incumbent
- Assumed office 2020
- Preceded by: Derek Slap

Member and Vice Chair of the West Hartford, Connecticut Board of Education
- In office 2013–2020
- Succeeded by: Jason Oliver Chang

Personal details
- Born: 1967 (age 58–59)
- Party: Democratic
- Spouse: Earl
- Children: 3

Tammy Rush Exum (born 1967) is a teacher and politician from Connecticut. She is a member of the Connecticut House of Representatives since 2019, when she won the special election. Formerly, she was a member and later the Vice Chair of the West Hartford, Connecticut Board of Education. She was also very active in the school community working the PTA and more. She is a member of the Democratic Party.

== Early life ==
Exum earned a bachelor's degree in Early Childhood Education and a master's degree in Business Administration.

== Career ==
Exum was a public school teacher. Later, she was elected to the West Hartford, Connecticut Board of Education.

== Connecticut House of Representatives ==
Since 2019, Exum has been a member of the, Administration and Elections Committee, Environment Committee, and the Banking Committee, all in the Connecticut House of Representatives. In Exum's State Representative district, she represents part of Avon, Connecticut, Farmington, Connecticut, and West Hartford, Connecticut.

== Elections ==
In 2013, Exum announced her Board of Education candidacy by a YouTube Video. In the 2019 Special Election, Exum beat Republican Robert Margolis by 30%. She was reelected in 2020. She is unchallenged.

== Personal life ==
She lives with her husband, Earl Exum, and three children in West Hartford, Connecticut.
