= Connecticut's 107th House of Representatives district =

American legislative district

Connecticut's 107th State House of Representatives district
Representative
Martin Foncello; R

Connecticut's 107th House of Representatives district elects one member of the Connecticut House of Representatives. It consists of the town of Brookfield and parts of Danbury and Bethel. It has been represented by Republican Martin Foncello since 2023.

== List of representatives ==
List of representatives from Connecticut's 107th State House district
Representative	Party	Years	District home	Note
Theresa Taneszio	Democratic	1967–1973	New Haven	Seat established
Francis J. Collins	Republican	1973–1975	Brookfield Center	Redistricted from the 165th District and also served as Speaker of the Connecticut House of Representatives
James M. Mannion	Democratic	1975–1977	Bethel	
David W. Smith	Republican	1977–1985	Brookfield Center	
Jodi Rell	Republican	1985–1995	Brookfield	Later became Lieutenant Governor and Governor
B. Scott Santa-Maria	Republican	1995–1999	Brookfield	Died of a self-inflicted gunshot wound
David Scribner	Republican	1999–2015	Brookfield	Resigned to become a state liquor control commissioner
Stephen Harding	Republican	2015–2023	Brookfield	Later served as a Connecticut State Senator
Martin Foncello	Republican	2023–present	Brookfield	
Julie Kerton	Democratic	2027 member-elect		

== Recent elections ==
=== 2020 ===
2020 Connecticut State House of Representatives election, District 107
Party	Candidate	Votes	%
Republican	Stephen Harding (incumbent)	8,248	54.70
Democratic	Kerri Colombo	6,086	40.36
Independent Party	Stephen Harding (incumbent)	486	3.22
Working Families	Kerri Colombo	259	1.72
Total votes		15,080	100.00
Republican hold			

=== 2018 ===
2018 Connecticut House of Representatives election, District 107
Party	Candidate	Votes	%
Republican	Stephen Harding (Incumbent)	6,890	59.3
Democratic	Daniel Pearson	4,736	40.7
Total votes		11,626	100.00
Republican hold			

=== 2016 ===
2016 Connecticut House of Representatives election, District 107
Party	Candidate	Votes	%
Republican	Stephen Harding (Incumbent)	10,207	100.00
Total votes		10,207	100.00
Republican hold			

=== 2015 special ===
2015 Connecticut House of Representatives special elections, District 107
Party	Candidate	Votes	%
Republican	Stephen Harding (Incumbent)	1,600	54.2
Democratic	Howard Lasser	1,350	45.8
Total votes		2,950	100.00
Republican hold			

=== 2014 ===
2014 Connecticut House of Representatives election, District 107
Party	Candidate	Votes	%
Republican	David Scribner (Incumbent)	5,476	64.6
Democratic	Dan Smolnik	2,374	28.0
Independent Party	David Scribner (Incumbent)	463	5.5
Working Families	Dan Smolnik	164	1.9
Total votes		8,477	100.00
Republican hold			

=== 2012 ===
2012 Connecticut House of Representatives election, District 107
Party	Candidate	Votes	%
Republican	David Scribner (Incumbent)	8,653	86.7
Working Families	David Stevenson	1,375	13.7
Total votes		10,028	100.00
Republican hold			
