= Connecticut's 21st State Senate district =

American legislative district

Senator
Jason Perillo; R

Connecticut's 21st State Senate district elects one member of the Connecticut State Senate. It consists of the city of Shelton, and parts of Seymour, Monroe, and Stratford. It is currently represented by Republican Jason Perillo.

== List of senators ==
Representative	Party	Years	District home	Note
John J. Relihan	Democratic	1959 – 1966	Bridgeport	Died in office
George Gunther	Republican	1967 – 2007	Stratford	Longest-serving state legislator in Connecticut history
Dan Debicella	Republican	2007 – 2011	Shelton	Unsuccessfully ran for Congress
Kevin C. Kelly	Republican	2011 – 2025	Stratford	Serving as Minority Leader of the Connecticut State Senate
Jason Perillo	Republican	2025 – present	Shelton	

== Recent elections ==
=== 2020 ===
2020 Connecticut State Senate election, District 21
Party	Candidate	Votes	%
Republican	Kevin C. Kelly (incumbent)	37,602	100.00
Republican hold			

=== 2018 ===
2018 Connecticut State Senate election, District 21 {
Party	Candidate	Votes	%
Republican	Kevin C. Kelly (incumbent)	24,589	56.7
Democratic	Monica Tujak Brill	18,805	43.3
Total votes		43,394	100.0
Republican hold			

=== 2016 ===
2016 Connecticut State Senate election, District 21
Party	Candidate	Votes	%
Republican	Kevin C. Kelly (incumbent)	30,966	65.15
Democratic	Prez Palmer	16,561	34.85
Total votes		47,527	100.0
Republican hold			

=== 2014 ===
2014 Connecticut State Senate election, District 21
Party	Candidate	Votes	%
Republican	Kevin C. Kelly (incumbent)	21,731	67.7
Democratic	Prez Palmer	10,384	32.30
Total votes		32,115	100.0
Republican hold			

=== 2012 ===
2012 Connecticut State Senate election, District 21
Party	Candidate	Votes	%
Republican	Kevin C. Kelly (incumbent)	28,528	100.00
Republican hold			
