= Jason Perillo =

American politician (born 1977)

Member of the Connecticut State Senate from the 21st district
- Incumbent
- Assumed office February 28, 2025
- Preceded by: Kevin Kelly
- Succeeded by: Carolann Reid (elect)

Member of the Connecticut House of Representatives from the 113th district
- In office October 2007 – February 28, 2025
- Preceded by: Richard Belden
- Succeeded by: Amy Romano

Personal details
- Born: August 20, 1977 (age 49) Shelton, Connecticut
- Party: Republican
- Education: Georgetown University (BA); Boston College (MBA); Harvard University (MPA)

Jason Perillo (born August 20, 1977) is an American politician who has served in the Connecticut State Senate from the 21st district since 2025, elected in a special election. Prior to his election to State Senate, he previously served in the state House of Representatives for the 113th district, representing part of Shelton.
