= Juan Candelaria =

American politician

Member of the Connecticut House of Representatives from the 95th district
- Incumbent
- Assumed office January 7, 2003

Personal details
- Born: October 27, 1970 (age 55) Hatillo, Puerto Rico
- Education: Albertus Magnus College (BS); University of New Haven (MBA)

Juan R. Candelaria (born October 27, 1970) is an American Democratic politician. He is a member of the Connecticut House of Representatives from the 95th District, being first elected in 2002. He is a member of the Appropriations, Education, Higher Education and Employment Advancement Committees and the Joint Committee on Legislative Management Committee. Candelaria is a graduate of Albertus Magnus College and holds a Master of Business Administration MBA from the University of New Haven.
