= Connecticut's 43rd House of Representatives district =

American legislative district

Connecticut's 43rd State House of Representatives district
Representative
Greg Howard; R

Connecticut's 43rd House of Representatives district elects one member of the Connecticut House of Representatives. Its current representative is Republican Greg Howard, elected in 2021.

== List of representatives ==
Representative	Party	Years	District home	Note
William C. Leary	Democratic	1967 – 1971	Windsor Locks	Resigned to become a Judge of Probate
Joseph W. Marinone	Republican	1972 – 1973	Windsor	Redistricted to the 60th District
Howard E. Crouch	Republican	1973 – 1975	Stonington	Redistricted from the 64th District
Rufus Allyn	Democratic	1975 – 1983	Mystic	
Frank Turek	Republican	1983 – 1991	Stonington	Died in office
Robert R. Simmons	Republican	1991 – 2001	Stonington	Elected to U.S. Congress
Diana Urban	Republican	2001 – 2006	North Stonington	Defected to the Democratic Party
Diana Urban	Democratic	2006 – 2019	North Stonington	Retired
Kate Rotella	Democratic	2019 – 2021	Mystic	Incumbent
Greg Howard	Republican	2021 – present	Stonington	Incumbent
Bill Heughins	Democratic	2027 member-elect		

== Recent elections ==
State Election 2008: House District 43
Party	Candidate	Votes	%	±%
Democratic	Diana Urban	8,078	63.7	+63.7
Republican	Brian Kluberdanz	4,601	36.3	−63.7
Majority		3,477	27.4	−72.6
Turnout		12,679		
Democratic gain from Republican		Swing	+63.7	

State Election 2006: House District 43
Party	Candidate	Votes	%	±%
Republican	Diana Urban	6,181	100.0	+0.0
Majority		6,181	100.0	+0.0
Turnout		6,181		
Republican hold		Swing	+0.0	

State Election 2004: House District 43
Party	Candidate	Votes	%	±%
Republican	Diana Urban	7,663	100.0	+0.0
Majority		7,663	100.0	+0.0
Turnout		7,663		
Republican hold		Swing	+0.0	

State Election 2002: House District 43
Party	Candidate	Votes	%	±%
Republican	Diana Urban	6,002	100.0	+62.9
Majority		6,002	100.0	+99.7
Turnout		6,002		
Republican hold		Swing	+62.9	

State Election 2000: House District 43
Party	Candidate	Votes	%	±%
Republican	Diana Urban	4,030	37.1	−36.3
Democratic	Steven E. Donahue	3,996	36.8	+10.2
Libertarian	Michael J. Costanza	2,832	26.1	+26.1
Majority		34	0.3	−46.6
Turnout		10,858		
Republican hold		Swing	-36.3	

State Election 1998: House District 43
Party	Candidate	Votes	%	±%
Republican	Robert R. Simmons	5,328	73.4	
Democratic	Terrance M. Donovan	1,927	26.6	
Majority		3,401	46.9	
Turnout		7,255		
Republican hold		Swing		
