= Connecticut's 19th House of Representatives district =

American legislative district

Connecticut's 19th State House of Representatives district
Representative
Tammy Exum; D

Connecticut's 19th House of Representatives district elects one member of the Connecticut House of Representatives. It encompasses parts of Avon, Farmington, and West Hartford. It has been represented by Democrat Tammy Exum since 2019.

== List of representatives ==
List of Representatives from Connecticut's 19th State House District
Representative	Party	Years	District home	Note
Robert Z. Stavnitsky	Republican	1967–1969	Manchester	Seat created
Francis J. Mahoney	Democratic	1969–1973	Manchester	
Clyde W. Fuller	Republican	1973–1975	West Hartford	
Robert D. Shea	Democratic	1975–1977	West Hartford	
John A. Berman	Republican	1977–1981	West Hartford	
Robert Farr	Republican	1981–2007	West Hartford	
Beth Bye	Democratic	2007–2011	West Hartford	Elected to the Connecticut State Senate
Brian Becker	Democratic	2011–2017	West Hartford	Did not run for reelection
Derek Slap	Democratic	2017–2019	West Hartford	Elected to the Connecticut State Senate
Tammy Exum	Democratic	2019–	West Hartford	

== Recent elections ==
=== 2020 ===
2020 Connecticut State House of Representatives election, District 19
Party	Candidate	Votes	%
Democratic	Tammy Exum (incumbent)	11,682	100.00
Democratic hold			

=== 2018 ===
2020 Connecticut State House of Representatives election, District 19
Party	Candidate	Votes	%
Democratic	Derek Slap (incumbent)	9,515	100.00
Democratic hold			

=== 2016 ===
2016 Connecticut State House of Representatives election, District 13
Party	Candidate	Votes	%
Democratic	Derek Slap (incumbent)	7,669	53.85
Republican	Chris Barnes	6,573	46.15
Total votes		14,242	100.00
Democratic hold			

=== 2014 ===
2014 Connecticut State House of Representatives election, District 13
Party	Candidate	Votes	%
Democratic	Brian Becker (incumbent)	6,147	57.3
Republican	Mark Zydanowicz	4,580	42.7
Total votes		10,727	100.00
Democratic hold			

=== 2012 ===
2012 Connecticut State House of Representatives election, District 13
Party	Candidate	Votes	%
Democratic	Brian Becker (incumbent)	8,266	62.26
Republican	Jon Landry	5,010	37.74
Total votes		13,276	100.00
Democratic hold			
