= Connecticut's 113th House of Representatives district =

American legislative district

Connecticut's 113th State House of Representatives district
Representative
Amy Romano; R

Connecticut's 113th House of Representatives district elects one member of the Connecticut House of Representatives. It encompasses parts of Shelton and is currently represented by Republican Amy Romano.

== List of representatives ==
List of representatives from Connecticut's 113th State House district
Representative	Party	Years	District home	Note
Albert Webber	Democratic	1967–1973	New Haven	Seat created
James S. Connery	Republican	1973–1975	Shelton	
Richard Belden	Republican	1975–2007	Shelton	Died in office
Jason Perillo	Republican	2007–2025	Shelton	First elected in special election; left office in 2025 after winning a special election to the Connecticut State Senate
Amy Romano	Republican	2025–	Shelton	Elected in special election

== Recent elections ==
=== 2025 special ===
2025 Connecticut House of Representatives special elections, District 113
Party	Candidate	Votes	%
Republican	Amy Romano	1,638	52.55
Democratic	Mike Duncan	1,479	47.45
Total votes		3,117	100.00
Republican hold			

=== 2024 ===
2024 Connecticut House of Representatives elections, District 113
Party	Candidate	Votes	%
Republican	Jason Perillo (Incumbent)	9,346	100.00
Total votes		9,346	100.00
Republican hold			

=== 2022 ===
2022 Connecticut House of Representatives elections, District 113
Party	Candidate	Votes	%
Republican	Jason Perillo (Incumbent)	7,089	100.00
Total votes		7,089	100.00
Republican hold			

=== 2020 ===
2020 Connecticut State House of Representatives election, District 113
Party	Candidate	Votes	%
Republican	Jason Perillo (incumbent)	8,010	64.12
Democratic	Elaine Matto	4,483	35.88
Total votes		12,493	100.00
Republican hold			

=== 2018 ===
2018 Connecticut House of Representatives elections, District 113
Party	Candidate	Votes	%
Republican	Jason Perillo (Incumbent)	6,233	65.1
Democratic	Elaine Matto	3,347	34.9
Total votes		9,580	100.00
Republican hold			

=== 2016 ===
2016 Connecticut House of Representatives elections, District 113
Party	Candidate	Votes	%
Republican	Jason Perillo (Incumbent)	8,090	72.84
Democratic	Adam Heller	3,017	27.16
Total votes		11,107	100.00
Republican hold			

=== 2014 ===
2014 Connecticut House of Representatives elections, District 113
Party	Candidate	Votes	%
Republican	Jason Perillo (Incumbent)	5,695	100.00
Total votes		5,695	100.00
Republican hold			

=== 2012 ===
2012 Connecticut House of Representatives elections, District 113
Party	Candidate	Votes	%
Republican	Jason Perillo (Incumbent)	6,574	69.5
Democratic	Elaine Matto	2,891	30.5
Total votes		9,465	100.00
Republican hold			
