= Connecticut House of Representatives =

Lower house of the Connecticut General Assembly

- Connecticut General Assembly

Type
- Type: Lower house
- Term limits: None

History
- New session started: January 8, 2025

Leadership
- Speaker: Matthew Ritter (D) since January 6, 2021
- Speaker pro tempore: Bob Godfrey (D) since January 3, 2017
- Majority Leader: Jason Rojas (D) since January 6, 2021
- Minority Leader: Vincent Candelora (R) since January 6, 2021

Structure
- Seats: 151
- Political groups: Majority: Democratic (102); Minority: Republican (49)
- Length of term: 2 years
- Authority: Article III, Section 1, Connecticut Constitution
- Salary: $43,600

Elections
- Last election: November 5, 2024 (151 seats)
- Next election: November 3, 2026 (151 seats)
- Redistricting: Legislative Control

Meeting place
- House of Representatives Chamber; Connecticut State Capitol; Hartford, Connecticut

Website
- Connecticut House of Representatives

The Connecticut House of Representatives is the lower house in the Connecticut General Assembly, the state legislature of the U.S. state of Connecticut. The house is composed of 151 members representing an equal number of districts, with each constituency containing nearly 22,600 residents. Representatives are elected to two-year terms with no term limits. The House convenes within the Connecticut State Capitol in Hartford.

== History ==
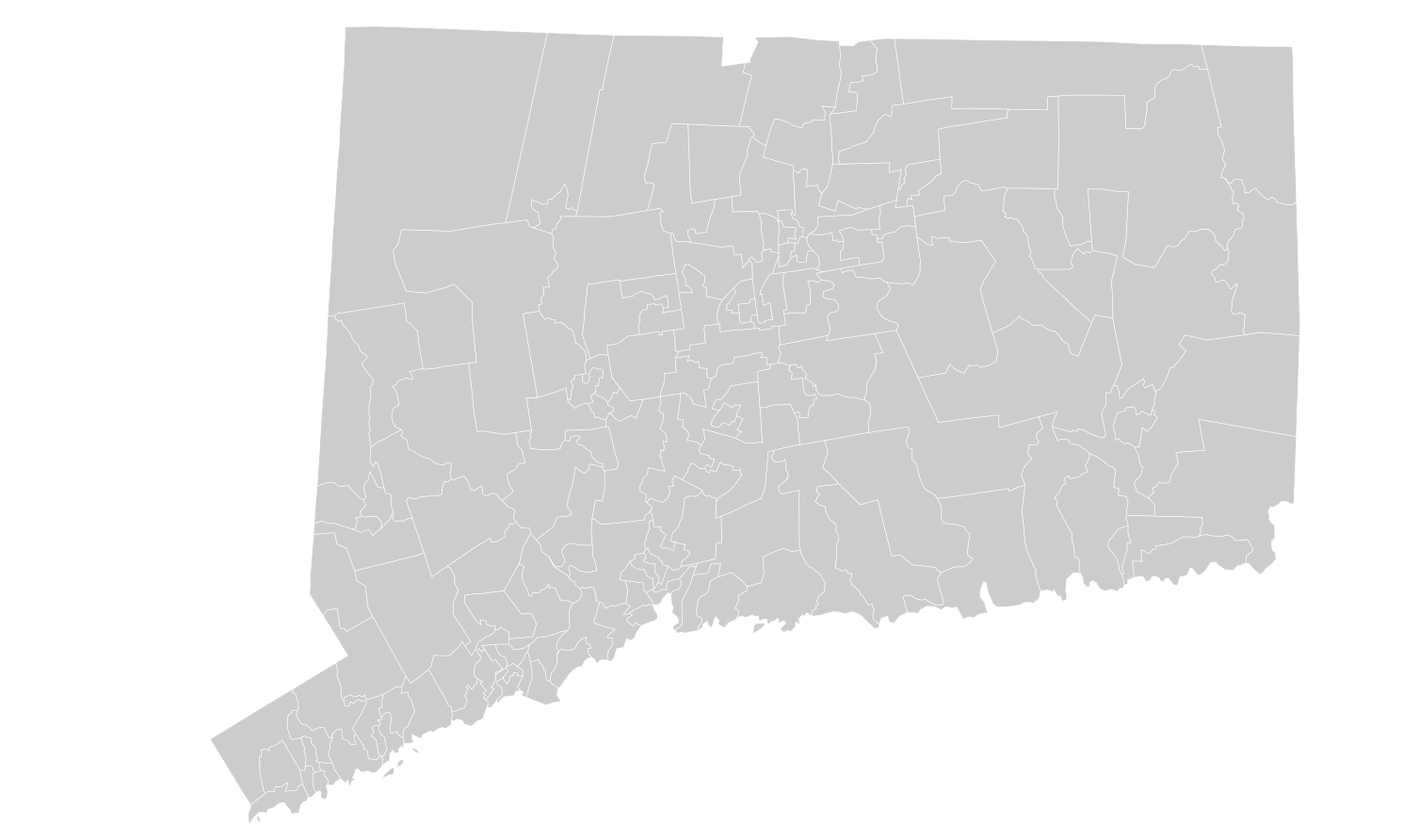
A blank map of the Connecticut State House districts.

The House of Representatives has its basis in the earliest incarnation of the General Assembly, the "General Corte" established in 1636 whose membership was divided between six generally elected magistrates (the predecessor of the Connecticut Senate) and three-member "committees" representing each of the three towns of the Connecticut Colony (Hartford, Wethersfield, and Windsor). The Fundamental Orders of Connecticut, adopted in 1639, replaced the committees with deputies; each town would elect three or four deputies for six-month terms. Although the magistrates and deputies sat together, they voted separately and in 1645 it was decreed that a measure had to have the approval of both groups in order to pass. The Charter of 1662 reduced the number of deputies per town to no more than two, and also changed the title of the legislature to the General Assembly. It was in 1698 that the General Assembly divided itself into its current bicameral form, with the twelve assistants (that replaced the magistrates) as the Council (which became the Senate in the 1818 constitution) and the deputies as the House of Representatives, which began electing the Speaker to preside over it. The terms of representatives were raised to two years in 1884.

== Leadership of the House ==
The Speaker of the House presides over the House of Representatives. The Speaker is elected by the majority party caucus followed by confirmation of the full House through the passage of a House resolution. In addition to presiding over the body, the Speaker is also its chief leadership position and controls the flow of legislation and committee assignments. Other House leaders, such as the majority and minority leaders, are elected by their respective party caucuses relative to their party's strength in the chamber.

The current Speaker is Matthew Ritter of the 1st House District that includes part of Hartford. The Majority Leader is Jason Rojas of the 9th House District which includes part of East Hartford and part of Manchester. The Minority Leader is Republican Vincent Candelora of the 86th House District that includes part of Durham, part of East Haven, part of Guilford, and North Branford.

Position	Representative	District
Speaker	Matthew Ritter	1
Majority Leader	Jason Rojas	9
Majority Whip	Raghib Allie-Brennan	2
Minority Leader	Vincent Candelora	86
Minority Whip	Kurt Vail	52

== Composition of the House of Representatives ==
102	49
Democratic	Republican

Affiliation	Party		Total	Vacant
Affiliation	Democratic	Republican	Total	Vacant
End of Previous Legislature: 2023–2025	98	53	151	0
Start of Current Legislature: 2025–2027 (Note: Democratic Rep. Christine Conley (District 40) resigned before the start of the legislative session to pursue another job.)	101	49	150	1
February 28, 2025 (Note: Democrat Dan Gaiewski won the special election for the 40th district; Republican Rep. Jason Perillo (District 113) resigned to take his elected seat in the State Senate.)	102	48	150	1
April 25, 2025 (Note: Republican Amy Romano won the special election for the 113th district.)	102	49	151	0
November 12, 2025 (Note: Democrat Bobby Sanchez (District 25) resigned after being elected mayor of New Britain.)	101	49	150	1
November 23, 2025 (Note: Democrat Kevin Ryan (District 139) died.)	100	49	149	2
January 6, 2026 (Note: Democrat Iris Sanchez won the special election for the 25th District.)	101	49	150	1
January 13, 2026 (Note: Democrat Larry Pemberton won the special election for the 139th District.)	102	49	151	0
Latest Voting Share	67.5%	32.5%		

== List of current members ==
Current members of the Connecticut House of Representatives, as of January 21, 2026.

District	Name	Party	Home city/town	First elected	Cities/towns represented
1	Matthew Ritter	Dem	Hartford	2010	Hartford (part)
2	Raghib Allie-Brennan	Dem	Bethel	2018	Bethel (part), Danbury (part)
3	Minnie Gonzalez	Dem	Hartford	1996	Hartford (part)
4	Julio Concepcion	Dem	Hartford	2018 (special)	Hartford (part)
5	Maryam Khan	Dem	Windsor	2022 (special)	Hartford (part), South Windsor (part), Windsor (part)
6	James Sanchez	Dem	Hartford	2023 (special)	Hartford (part), West Hartford (part)
7	Joshua Hall	Dem	Hartford	2017 (special)	Hartford (part)
8	Tim Ackert	Rep	Coventry	2010	Bolton (part), Columbia, Coventry, Lebanon (part), Tolland (part)
9	Jason Rojas	Dem	East Hartford	2008	East Hartford (part), Manchester (part)
10	Henry Genga	Dem	East Hartford	2006	East Hartford (part)
11	Patrick Biggins	Dem	East Hartford	2024	East Hartford (part), Manchester (part)
12	Geoff Luxenberg	Dem	Manchester	2018	Manchester (part)
13	Jason Doucette	Dem	Manchester	2018	Glastonbury (part), Manchester (part)
14	Tom Delnicki	Rep	South Windsor	2016	South Windsor (part)
15	Bobby Gibson	Dem	Bloomfield	2018 (special)	Bloomfield, West Hartford (part)
16	Melissa Osborne	Dem	Simsbury	2022	Simsbury
17	Eleni Kavros DeGraw	Dem	Avon	2020	Avon (part), Canton
18	Jillian Gilchrest	Dem	West Hartford	2018	West Hartford (part)
19	Tammy Exum	Dem	West Hartford	2019 (special)	Avon (part), West Hartford (part)
20	Kate Farrar	Dem	West Hartford	2020	Newington (part), West Hartford (part)
21	Mike Demicco	Dem	Farmington	2012	Farmington (part)
22	Rebecca Martinez	Dem	Plainville	2024	Farmington (part), Plainville, Southington (part)
23	Devin Carney	Rep	Old Lyme	2014	Lyme, Old Lyme, Old Saybrook, Westbrook (part)
24	Emmanuel Sanchez	Dem	New Britain	2020	New Britain (part)
25	Iris Sanchez	Dem	New Britain	2026 (special)	New Britain (part)
26	David DeFronzo	Dem	New Britain	2024	New Britain (part)
27	Gary Turco	Dem	Newington	2018	New Britain (part), Newington (part)
28	Amy Morrin Bello	Dem	Wethersfield	2020	Wethersfield (part)
29	Kerry Wood	Dem	Rocky Hill	2018	Rocky Hill, Wethersfield (part)
30	Donna Veach	Rep	Berlin	2020	Berlin (part), Southington (part)
31	Jill Barry	Dem	Glastonbury	2018	Glastonbury (part)
32	Christie Carpino	Rep	Cromwell	2010	Cromwell, Portland
33	Brandon Chafee	Dem	Middletown	2020	Middletown (part)
34	Irene Haines	Rep	East Haddam	2018	East Haddam, East Hampton, Salem (part)
35	Chris Aniskovich	Rep	Clinton	2022	Clinton, Killingworth, Westbrook (part)
36	Renee LaMark Muir	Dem	Deep River	2024	Chester, Deep River, Essex, Haddam
37	Nick Menapace	Dem	East Lyme	2024	East Lyme, Montville (part), Salem (part)
38	Nick Gauthier	Dem	Waterford	2024	Montville (part), Waterford
39	Anthony Nolan	Dem	New London	2019 (special)	New London (part)
40	Dan Gaiewski	Dem	Groton	2025 (special)	Groton (part), New London (part)
41	Aundre Bumgardner	Dem	Groton	2022	Groton (part), Stonington (part)
42	Savet Constantine	Dem	Wilton	2024	New Canaan (part), Ridgefield (part), Wilton
43	Greg Howard	Rep	Stonington	2020	Ledyard (part), North Stonington, Stonington (part)
44	Anne Dauphinais	Rep	Killingly	2016	Killingly (part), Plainfield (part), Sterling
45	Brian Lanoue	Rep	Griswold	2018	Griswold, Ledyard (part), Lisbon (part), Preston, Voluntown
46	Derell Wilson	Dem	Norwich	2022	Norwich (part)
47	Doug Dubitsky	Rep	Chaplin	2014	Brooklyn (part), Canterbury, Chaplin, Lisbon (part), Norwich (part), Plainfield (part), Scotland, Sprague
48	Mark DeCaprio	Rep	Colchester	2022	Bozrah, Colchester, Franklin, Lebanon (part)
49	Susan Johnson	Dem	Windham	2008	Windham
50	Patrick Boyd	Dem	Pomfret	2016	Ashford, Brooklyn (part), Eastford, Hampton, Mansfield (part), Pomfret, Woodstock (part)
51	Chris Stewart	Rep	Putnam	2024	Killingly (part), Putnam, Thompson
52	Kurt Vail	Rep	Stafford	2014	Somers, Stafford, Union, Woodstock
53	Tammy Nuccio	Rep	Tolland	2020	Tolland (part), Willington, Vernon (part)
54	Gregory Haddad	Dem	Mansfield	2010	Mansfield (part)
55	Steve Weir	Rep	Hebron	2022	Andover, Bolton (part), Glastonbury (part), Hebron, Marlborough
56	Kevin Brown	Dem	Vernon	2022	Vernon (part)
57	Jaime Foster	Dem	East Windsor	2020	East Windsor (part), Ellington, Vernon (part)
58	John Santanella	Dem	Enfield	2024	Enfield (part)
59	Carol Hall	Rep	Enfield	2016	East Windsor (part), Enfield (part)
60	Jane Garibay	Dem	Windsor	2016	Windsor (part), Windsor Locks (part)
61	Tami Zawistowski	Rep	Suffield	2014	East Granby, Suffield, Windsor Locks (part)
62	Mark Anderson	Rep	Granby	2020	Barkhamsted, Granby, Hartland, New Hartford
63	Jay Case	Rep	Winchester	2012	Colebrook, Torrington (part), Winchester
64	Maria Horn	Dem	Salisbury	2018	Canaan, Cornwall, Goshen, Kent, Norfolk, North Canaan, Salisbury, Sharon, Washington
65	Joe Canino	Rep	Torrington	2024	Torrington (part)
66	Karen Reddington-Hughes	Rep	Woodbury	2022	Bethlehem, Litchfield (part), Morris, Warren, Woodbury
67	Bill Buckbee	Rep	New Milford	2016	New Milford (part)
68	Joe Polletta	Rep	Watertown	2017 (special)	Watertown, Waterbury (part)
69	Jason Buchsbaum	Rep	Southbury	2024	Bridgewater, Roxbury, New Milford (part), Southbury (part)
70	Seth Bronko	Rep	Naugatuck	2022	Naugatuck (part)
71	William Pizzuto	Rep	Middlebury	2022 (special)	Middlebury, Waterbury (part)
72	Larry Butler	Dem	Waterbury	2006	Waterbury (part)
73	Ronald Napoli	Dem	Waterbury	2018	Waterbury (part)
74	Michael DiGiovancarlo	Dem	Waterbury	2020	Waterbury (part)
75	Geraldo Reyes	Dem	Waterbury	2016	Waterbury (part)
76	John Piscopo	Rep	Thomaston	1988	Burlington, Harwinton, Litchfield (part), Thomaston
77	Cara Pavalock-D'Amato	Rep	Bristol	2014	Bristol (part)
78	Joe Hoxha	Rep	Bristol	2022	Bristol (part), Plymouth
79	Mary Fortier	Dem	Bristol	2022	Bristol (part)
80	Gale Mastrofrancesco	Rep	Wolcott	2018	Wolcott, Southington (part)
81	Christopher Poulos	Dem	Southington	2022	Southington (part)
82	Michael Quinn	Dem	Meriden	2020	Meriden (part)
83	Jonathan Fazzino	Dem	Berlin	2022	Berlin (part), Meriden (part), Cheshire (part)
84	Hilda Santiago	Dem	Meriden	2012	Meriden (part)
85	Mary Mushinsky	Dem	Wallingford	1980	Wallingford (part)
86	Vincent Candelora	Rep	North Branford	2006	Durham (part), East Haven (part), Guilford (part), North Branford
87	Dave Yaccarino	Rep	North Haven	2010	North Haven
88	Josh Elliott	Dem	Hamden	2016	Hamden (part)
89	Lezlye Zupkus	Rep	Prospect	2012	Bethany, Cheshire (part), Prospect, Waterbury (part)
90	Craig Fishbein	Rep	Wallingford	2016	Middlefield, Wallingford (part)
91	Laurie Sweet	Dem	Hamden	2024	Hamden (part)
92	Patricia Dillon	Dem	New Haven	1984	New Haven (part)
93	Toni Walker	Dem	New Haven	2001 (special)	New Haven (part)
94	Steven Winter	Dem	New Haven	2024	Hamden (part), New Haven (part)
95	Juan Candelaria	Dem	New Haven	2002	New Haven (part)
96	Roland Lemar	Dem	New Haven	2010	New Haven (part)
97	Alphonse Paolillo	Dem	New Haven	2018	New Haven (part)
98	Moira Rader	Dem	Guilford	2022	Branford (part), Guilford (part)
99	Joseph Zullo	Rep	East Haven	2019 (special)	East Haven (part)
100	Kai Belton	Dem	Middletown	2023 (special)	Middletown (part)
101	John-Michael Parker	Dem	Madison	2020	Durham (part), Madison
102	Robin Comey	Dem	Branford	2018	Branford (part)
103	Liz Linehan	Dem	Cheshire	2016	Cheshire (part), Hamden (part), Wallingford (part)
104	Kara Rochelle	Dem	Ansonia	2018	Ansonia, Derby (part)
105	Nicole Klarides-Ditria	Rep	Seymour	2018	Beacon Falls, Derby (part), Seymour
106	Mitch Bolinsky	Rep	Newtown	2012	Newtown (part)
107	Martin Foncello	Rep	Brookfield	2022	Bethel (part), Brookfield, Newtown (part)
108	Patrick Callahan	Rep	New Fairfield	2020	Danbury (part), New Fairfield, New Milford (part), Sherman
109	Farley Santos	Dem	Danbury	2022	Danbury (part)
110	Bob Godfrey	Dem	Danbury	1988	Danbury (part)
111	Aimee Berger-Girvalo	Dem	Ridgefield	2020	Ridgefield (part)
112	Tony Scott	Rep	Monroe	2021 (special)	Easton (part), Monroe, Trumbull (part)
113	Amy Romano	Rep	Shelton	2025 (special)	Shelton (part)
114	Mary Welander	Dem	Orange	2020	Derby (part), Hamden (part), Orange (part), Woodbridge
115	William Heffernan	Dem	West Haven	2024 (special)	West Haven (part)
116	Treneé McGee	Dem	West Haven	2021 (special)	West Haven (part)
117	Michael Shannon	Dem	Milford	2024	Milford (part), Orange (part), West Haven (part)
118	Frank Smith	Dem	Milford	2020	Milford (part)
119	Kathy Kennedy	Rep	Milford	2018	Orange (part), Milford (part)
120	Kaitlyn Shake	Dem	Stratford	2024	Stratford (part)
121	Joseph Gresko	Dem	Stratford	2016	Stratford (part)
122	Ben McGorty	Rep	Shelton	2014	Shelton (part), Stratford (part), Trumbull (part)
123	David Rutigliano	Rep	Trumbull	2012	Trumbull (part)
124	Andre Baker	Dem	Bridgeport	2014	Bridgeport (part)
125	Tom O'Dea	Rep	New Canaan	2012	Darien (part), New Canaan (part), Stamford (part)
126	Fred Gee	Dem	Bridgeport	2022	Bridgeport (part)
127	Marcus Brown	Dem	Bridgeport	2022	Bridgeport (part)
128	Christopher Rosario	Dem	Bridgeport	2014	Bridgeport (part)
129	Steven Stafstrom	Dem	Bridgeport	2015 (special)	Bridgeport (part)
130	Antonio Felipe	Dem	Bridgeport	2019 (special)	Bridgeport (part)
131	Arnold Jensen	Rep	Oxford	2024	Naugatuck (part), Oxford, Southbury (part)
132	Jennifer Leeper	Dem	Fairfield	2020	Fairfield (part)
133	Cristin McCarthy Vahey	Dem	Fairfield	2014	Bridgeport (part), Fairfield (part)
134	Sarah Keitt	Dem	Fairfield	2022	Fairfield (part), Trumbull (part)
135	Anne Hughes	Dem	Redding	2018	Easton (part), Redding, Weston
136	Jonathan Steinberg	Dem	Westport	2010	Westport (part)
137	Kadeem Roberts	Dem	Norwalk	2022	Norwalk (part)
138	Kenneth Gucker	Dem	Danbury	2024	Danbury (part)
139	Larry Pemberton	Dem	Montville	2026 (special)	Ledyard (part), Montville (part), Norwich (part)
140	Travis Simms	Dem	Norwalk	2018	Norwalk (part)
141	Tracy Marra	Rep	Darien	2022	Darien (part), Norwalk (part)
142	Lucy Dathan	Dem	New Canaan	2018	New Canaan (part), Norwalk (part)
143	Dominique Johnson	Dem	Norwalk	2022	Norwalk (part), Westport (part)
144	Hubert Delany	Dem	Stamford	2022 (special)	Stamford (part)
145	Corey Paris	Dem	Stamford	2021 (special)	Stamford (part)
146	Eilish Collins Main	Dem	Stamford	2024	Stamford (part)
147	Matt Blumenthal	Dem	Stamford	2018	Stamford (part), Darien (part)
148	Jonathan Jacobson	Dem	Stamford	2024	Stamford (part)
149	Tina Courpas	Rep	Greenwich	2024	Greenwich (part), Stamford (part)
150	Stephen Meskers	Dem	Greenwich	2018	Greenwich (part)
151	Hector Arzeno	Dem	Greenwich	2022	Greenwich (part)

== Notable former House members ==
=== 1700s ===
- Jonathan Trumbull, Governor of Connecticut Colony, Governor of Connecticut
- Roger Sherman, First Mayor of New Haven, Constitutional Signatory, United States Congressman, United States Senator
- Jonathan Trumbull Jr. Aide-de-camp to General Washington, Congressman, US Senator, 20th Governor of Connecticut
- Jeremiah Wadsworth, Congressman, Constitutional Convention Member
- John Davenport (Connecticut politician), Continental Army Officer, Congressman

=== 1800s ===
- Gideon Tomlinson, Congressman, US Senator, 25th Governor of Connecticut
- Noah Webster, Dictionary author and educator
- Henry W. Edwards, Congressman, US Senator, 27th and 29th Governor of Connecticut
- Samuel A. Foot, Congressman, US Senator, 28th Governor of Connecticut
- Isaac Toucey, Congressman, US Senator, United States Attorney General, Secretary of the Navy, 33rd Governor of Connecticut
- William W. Eaton, Congressman and US Senator
- Marcus H. Holcomb, Connecticut Attorney General, 66th Governor of Connecticut
- Henry C. Deming, Congressman, Mayor of Hartford, Commander of the 12th Connecticut Infantry Regiment
- John T. Wait, Congressman
- William E. Simonds, Congressman, Patent Commissioner, Medal of Honor recipient
- Augustus Brandegee Congressman, Mayor of New London
- John Q. Tilson, Congressman
- E. Stevens Henry, Connecticut State Treasurer, Congressman
- P.T. Barnum, showman, politician, and businessman known for the Barnum and Bailey Circus.
- Charles Phelps, lawyer, state legislator, Connecticut Secretary of State, and first Attorney General of Connecticut
- Oswald Langdon Woodford, Congressman

=== 1900s ===
- Marcus H. Holcomb, Attorney General of Connecticut, 66th Governor of Connecticut
- Everett J. Lake, 67th Governor of Connecticut
- Raymond E. Baldwin, Congressman, United States Senator, 72nd and 74th Governor of Connecticut, Chief Justice of the Connecticut Court of Errors, Chair of the 1965 Constitutional Convention
- Emily Sophie Brown, one of the first women to be elected to the Connecticut House of Representatives
- Abraham A. Ribicoff, 80th Governor of Connecticut, United States Senator, United States Secretary of Health, Education, and Welfare
- John N. Dempsey, 81st Governor of Connecticut
- William R. Ratchford, Congressman
- Stewart McKinney (politician), Congressman
- Sam Gejdenson, Congressman
- Ronald A. Sarasin, Congressman
- Ella T. Grasso, 83rd Governor of Connecticut
- Barbara B. Kennelly, Congresswoman
- William O'Neill, 84th Governor of Connecticut
- Lowell P. Weicker Jr., Congressman, US Senator, 85th Governor of Connecticut
- Sam Gejdenson, Congressman
- John G. Rowland, 86th Governor of Connecticut
- Gary Franks, Congressman
- Christopher Shays, Congressman
- Susan Bysiewicz, Lieutenant Governor and Secretary of State.
- George Jepsen, Connecticut Attorney General and Chair of the Connecticut Democratic Party.

=== 2000s ===
- Rob Simmons, Congressman
- Jodi Rell, 87th Governor of Connecticut
- Joe Courtney, Congressman
- Richard Blumenthal, Connecticut Attorney General and US Senator
- Chris Murphy, Congressman and US Senator

=== 2010s ===
- Elizabeth Esty, Congresswoman.
- Denise Merrill, Connecticut Secretary of State.
- William Tong, Connecticut Attorney General

=== 2020s ===
- Stephanie Thomas, Connecticut Secretary of State.
- Sean Scanlon, Connecticut State Comptroller.

== See also ==
- Connecticut State Capitol
- Connecticut General Assembly
- Connecticut Senate
- List of members of the Connecticut General Assembly from Norwalk
