= 2020 Connecticut House of Representatives election =

- November 3, 2020

All 151 seats in the Connecticut House of Representatives 76 seats needed for a majority
	Majority party	Minority party
Leader	Joe Aresimowicz (retired)	Themis Klarides (retired)
Party	Democratic	Republican
Leader's seat	30th District	114th district
Last election	92	59
Seats before	91	60
Seats won	97	54
Seat change	▲6	▼6
Popular vote	908,640	715,311
Percentage	53.59%	42.19%
Swing	▼1.01%	▼2.88%
- Democratic gain Republican gain Democratic hold Republican hold 40–50% 50–60% 60–70% 70–80% 80–90% >90% 40–50% 50–60% 60–70% 70–80% 80–90% >90%
Speaker before election
Matthew Ritter
Democratic
Elected Speaker
Matthew Ritter
Democratic

The 2020 Connecticut House of Representatives election was held on Tuesday, November 3, 2020, to elect members to the Connecticut House of Representatives, one from each of the state's 151 General Assembly districts. The date of this the election corresponded with other elections in the state, including presidential, U.S. House, and the Connecticut State Senate. Democrats retained control of the House of Representatives, expanding their majority winning 97 seats to the Republicans 54, a net gain of 6.

Representatives elected served a two-year term from in January 2021.

== Retirements ==
15 incumbents did not seek re-election in 2020.

=== Democrats ===
1. District 20: Joseph Verrengia retired.
2. District 24: Rick Lopes retired to be elected to Connecticut's 6th State Senate district in 2022.
3. District 30: Joe Aresimowicz retired.
4. District 33: Joseph Serra retired.
5. District 82: Emil Altobello retired.
6. District 118: Kim Rose retired.

=== Republicans ===
1. District 35: Jesse MacLachlan retired.
2. District 57: Christopher Davis retired.
3. District 62: William Simanski retired.
4. District 69: Arthur O'Neill retired.
5. District 108: Richard Smith retired.
6. District 111: John H. Frey retired.
7. District 114: Themis Klarides retired.
8. District 143: Gail Lavielle retired.
9. District 149: Livvy Floren retired.

== Predictions ==
Source	Ranking	As of
The Cook Political Report	Safe D	October 21, 2020

== Results ==
↓
97	54
Democratic	Republican

Parties	Seats				Popular vote	
Parties	2018	2020	±	Strength	Vote	%
Democratic	92	97	▲5	64.24%	908,640	53.59%
Republican	59	54	▼5	35.76%	544,387	42.19%
Independent Party	0	0	Steady	0.00%	41,132	2.43%
Working Families	0	0	Steady	0.00%	25,206	1.49%
Other parties and Write-ins	0	0	Steady	0.00%	4,160	0.25%
Green	0	0	Steady	0.00%	650	0.04%
Libertarian	0	0	Steady	0.00%	291	0.02%
Total	151	151	0	100.00%	1,695,390	100.00%

House Seats
Democratic	64.24%
Republican	35.76%

== Detailed results ==
=== District 1 ===
Democratic incumbent and House Majority Leader Matthew Ritter was re-elected to a 6th term after defeating Epic Party candidate Mark Stewart Greenstein and Socialist Resurgence Party Candidate Daniel Piper. Ritter was elected Speaker of the House on January 6, 2021. He has represented the 1st district since 2011.

2020 Connecticut State House of Representatives election, District 1
Party	Candidate	Votes	%
Democratic	Matthew Ritter (incumbent)	5,198	91.77
Epic Party	Mark Stewart Greenstein	290	5.12
Socialist Resurgence Party	Daniel Piper	176	3.11
Total votes		5,659	100.00
Democratic hold			

=== District 2 ===
Democratic incumbent Raghib Allie-Brennan was re-elected to a 2nd term after defeating Republican Dan Carter. Allie-Brennan was also nominated by the Working Families Party, while Carter was nominated by the Independent Party. Allie-Brennan has represented the 2nd district since 2019.

2020 Connecticut State House of Representatives election, District 2
Party	Candidate	Votes	%
Democratic	Raghib Allie-Brennan (incumbent)	6,848	51.29
Republican	Dan E. Carter	5,885	44.08
Independent Party	Dan E. Carter	330	2.47
Working Families	Raghib Allie-Brennan (incumbent)	288	2.16
Total votes		13,351	100.00
Democratic hold			

=== District 3 ===
Democratic incumbent Minnie Gonzalez was re-elected to a 13th term after running unopposed. Gonzalez has represented the 3rd district since 1997.

2020 Connecticut State House of Representatives election, District 3
Party	Candidate	Votes	%
Democratic	Minnie Gonzalez (incumbent)	3,983	100.00
Democratic hold			

=== District 4 ===
Democratic incumbent Julio Concepcion was re-elected to a 3rd term after defeating Republican candidate Barry D'Andrea. Concepcion has represented the 4th district since 2018.

2020 Connecticut State House of Representatives election, District 4
Party	Candidate	Votes	%
Democratic	Julio Concepcion (incumbent)	3,944	86.09
Republican	Barry J. D'Andrea	637	13.91
Total votes		4,581	100.00
Democratic hold			

=== District 5 ===
Democratic incumbent Brandon McGee was re-elected to a 5th term after defeating Republican candidate Charles Jackson. Jackson was also nominated by the Independent Party. McGee has represented the 5th district since 2013.

2020 Connecticut State House of Representatives election, District 5
Party	Candidate	Votes	%
Democratic	Brandon McGee (incumbent)	8,140	84.40
Republican	Charles Jackson	1,303	13.51
Independent Party	Charles Jackson	202	2.09
Total votes		9,645	100.00
Democratic hold			

=== District 6 ===
Democratic incumbent Edwin Vargas Jr. was re-elected to a 5th term after running unopposed. Vargas was also nominated by the Working Families Party. He has represented the 6th district since 2013.

2020 Connecticut State House of Representatives election, District 6
Party	Candidate	Votes	%
Democratic	Edwin Vargas (incumbent)	5,118	93.43
Working Families	Edwin Vargas (incumbent)	360	6.57
Total votes		5,478	100.00
Democratic hold			

=== District 7 ===
Democratic incumbent Joshua M. Hall was re-elected to a 3rd term after running unopposed. Hall has represented the 7th district since 2017.

2020 Connecticut State House of Representatives election, District 7
Party	Candidate	Votes	%
Democratic	Joshua M. Hall (incumbent)	5,663	100.00
Democratic hold			

=== District 8 ===
Republican incumbent Tim Ackert was re-elected to a 6th term after defeating Democratic candidate Brenda Falusi. Ackert has represented the 7th district since 2011.

2020 Connecticut State House of Representatives election, District 8
Party	Candidate	Votes	%
Republican	Tim Ackert (incumbent)	9,128	60.85
Democratic	Brenda Falusi	5,874	39.15
Total votes		15,002	100.00
Republican hold			

=== District 9 ===
Democratic incumbent Jason Rojas was re-elected to a 7th term after defeating Republican candidate Cathy Hopperstad. Hopperstad was also nominated by the Independent Party. Rojas was elected House Majority Leader on January 6, 2021. He has represented the 9th district since 2009.

2020 Connecticut State House of Representatives election, District 9
Party	Candidate	Votes	%
Democratic	Jason Rojas (incumbent)	7,343	66.53
Republican	Cathy Hopperstad	3,454	31.29
Independent Party	Cathy Hopperstad	240	2.17
Total votes		11,037	100.00
Democratic hold			

=== District 10 ===
Democratic incumbent Henry Grenga was re-elected to a 9th term after running unopposed. He has represented the 10th district since 2006.

2020 Connecticut State House of Representatives election, District 10
Party	Candidate	Votes	%
Democratic	Henry Genga (incumbent)	7,028	100.00
Democratic hold			

=== District 11 ===
Democratic incumbent Jeff Currey was re-elected to a 4th term after defeating Republican candidate Matt Harper. Harper was also nominated by the Independent Party. Currey has represented the 11th district since 2015.

2020 Connecticut State House of Representatives election, District 11
Party	Candidate	Votes	%
Democratic	Jeffrey Currey (incumbent)	5,845	69.72
Republican	Matt Harper	2,329	27.78
Independent Party	Matt Harper	210	2.50
Total votes		8,384	100.00
Democratic hold			

=== District 12 ===
Democratic incumbent Geoff Luxenberg was re-elected to a 4th term after defeating Republican candidate Jeff Sullivan. Luxenberg was also nominated by the Working Families Party. He has represented the 12th district from 2011 to 2015, and then from 2019 to present.

2020 Connecticut State House of Representatives election, District 12
Party	Candidate	Votes	%
Democratic	Geoff Luxenberg (incumbent)	7,457	63.69
Republican	Jeff Sullivan	3,841	32.80
Working Families	Geoff Luxenberg (incumbent)	411	3.51
Total votes		11,709	100.00
Democratic hold			

=== District 13 ===
Democratic incumbent Jason Doucette was re-elected to a 2nd term after defeating Republican candidate Brain Marois. Doucette was also nominated by the Working Families Party, while Marois was nominated by the Independent Party. Doucette has represented the 13th district since 2019.

2020 Connecticut State House of Representatives election, District 13
Party	Candidate	Votes	%
Democratic	Jason Doucette (incumbent)	7,803	60.38
Republican	Brian Marois	4,553	35.23
Working Families	Jason Doucette (incumbent)	352	2.72
Independent Party	Brian Marois	216	1.67
Total votes		12,924	100.00
Democratic hold			

=== District 14 ===
Republican incumbent Tom Delnicki was re-elected to a 3rd term after defeating Democratic candidate Genevieve Coursey. Delnicki was also nominated by the Independent Party, while Coursey was nominated by the Working Families Party. Delnicki has represented the 14th district since 2017.

2020 Connecticut State House of Representatives election, District 14
Party	Candidate	Votes	%
Republican	Tom Delnicki (incumbent)	7,104	49.42
Democratic	Genevieve Coursey	6,349	44.17
Independent Party	Tom Delnicki (incumbent)	649	4.52
Working Families	Genevieve Coursey	272	1.89
Total votes		14,374	100.00
Republican hold			

=== District 15 ===
Democratic incumbent Bobby Gibson was re-elected to a 3rd term after defeating candidate Danielle Wong. Gibson had previously defeated Wong in the Democratic primary. Gibson was also nominated by the Working Families Party. He has represented the 15th district since 2018.

2020 Connecticut State House of Representatives election, District 15
Party	Candidate	Votes	%
Democratic	Bobby Gibson (incumbent)	10,733	85.74
Petitioning	Danielle Cecil Wong	1,323	10.57
Working Families	Bobby Gibson (incumbent)	462	3.69
Total votes		12,518	100.00
Democratic hold			

=== District 16 ===
Democratic incumbent John Hampton was re-elected to a 5th term after running unopposed. He has represented the 16th district since 2013.

2020 Connecticut State House of Representatives election, District 16
Party	Candidate	Votes	%
Democratic	John Hampton (incumbent)	11,730	100.00
Democratic hold			

=== District 17 ===
Democratic candidate Eleni Kavros DeGraw was elected after defeating 1st term Republican incumbent Leslee Hill. DeGraw was also nominated by the Working Families Party, while Hill was nominated by the Independent Party. Hill had represented the 17th district since 2019.

2020 Connecticut State House of Representatives election, District 17
Party	Candidate	Votes	%
Democratic	Eleni Kavros DeGraw	7,575	50.13
Working Families	Eleni Kavros DeGraw	257	1.70
Total	Eleni Kavros DeGraw	7,832	51.83
Republican	Leslee Hill	6,971	46.13
Independent Party	Leslee Hill	309	2.04
Total	Leslee Hill (Incumbent)	7,280	48.17
Democratic gain from Republican			

=== District 18 ===
Democratic incumbent Jillian Gilchrest was re-elected to a 2nd term after defeating Republican candidate Rick Bush. Gilchrest has represented the 18th district since 2019.

2020 Connecticut State House of Representatives election, District 18
Party	Candidate	Votes	%
Democratic	Jillian Gilchrest (incumbent)	9,030	72.72
Republican	Rick Bush	3,387	27.28
Total votes		12,417	100.00
Democratic hold			

=== District 19 ===
Democratic incumbent Tammy Exum was re-elected to a 2nd term after running unopposed. Exum has represented the 19th district since 2020

2020 Connecticut State House of Representatives election, District 19
Party	Candidate	Votes	%
Democratic	Tammy Exum (incumbent)	11,682	100.00
Democratic hold			

=== District 20 ===
Democratic candidate Kate Farrar was elected unopposed. Farrar was also nominated by the Working Families Party. This seat was previously held by Democrat Joe Verrengia, who had represented the 20th district since 2011. Verrengia decided not to run for re-election.

2020 Connecticut State House of Representatives election, District 20
Party	Candidate	Votes	%
Democratic	Kate Farrar	8,382	90.64
Working Families	Kate Farrar	866	9.36
Total votes		9,248	100.00
Democratic hold			

=== District 21 ===
Democratic incumbent Mike Demicco was re-elected to a 5th term after defeating Republican candidate John W. Brockelman and Independent Party candidate David Paul Kramer. Demicco was also nominated by the Working Families Party. He has represented the 21st district since 2013.

2020 Connecticut State House of Representatives election, District 21
Party	Candidate	Votes	%
Democratic	Mike Demicco (incumbent)	8,470	59.50
Republican	John W. Brockelman	5,316	36.19
Working Families	Mike Demicco (incumbent)	408	2.78
Independent Party	David Paul Kramer	224	1.53
Total votes		14,688	100.00
Democratic hold			

=== District 22 ===
Republican incumbent William Petit Jr. was re-elected to a 3rd term after running unopposed. Petit was also nominated by the Independent Party. He has represented the 22nd district since 2017.

2020 Connecticut State House of Representatives election, District 22
Party	Candidate	Votes	%
Republican	William Petit (incumbent)	7,005	79.63
Independent Party	William Petit (incumbent)	1,792	20.37
Total votes		8,797	100.00
Republican hold			

=== District 23 ===
Republican incumbent Devin Carney was re-elected to a 4th term after defeating Democratic candidate David A. Rubino. Carney was nominated by the Independent Party, while Rubino was nominated by the Working Families Party. Carney has represented the 23rd district since 2015.

2020 Connecticut's 23rd House of Representatives district election
- Precinct results Carney 50-60% Rubino 50-60%

2020 Connecticut State House of Representatives election, District 23
Party	Candidate	Votes	%
Republican	Devin Carney (incumbent)	8,510	52.55
Democratic	David A. Rubino	7,063	43.62
Independent Party	Devin Carney (incumbent)	423	2.61
Working Families	David A. Rubino	197	1.22
Total votes		16,193	100.00
Republican hold			

=== District 24 ===
Democratic candidate Manny Sanchez was elected after defeating Republican candidate Alden Russell. Sanchez was also nominated by the Working Families Party, while Russell was nominated by the Independent Party. This seat was previously held by Democrat Rick Lopes, who had represented District 24 since 2011. Lopes decided not to run for re-election to run successfully for State Senate.

2020 Connecticut State House of Representatives election, District 24
Party	Candidate	Votes	%
Democratic	Manny Sanchez	5,658	61.2
Republican	Alden Russell	3,145	34.02
Working Families	Manny Sanchez	325	3.52
Independent Party	Alden Russell	117	1.27
Total votes		9,245	100.00
Democratic hold			

=== District 25 ===
Democratic incumbent Bobby Sanchez was re-elected to a 6th term after defeating Republican candidate Jerrell Hargraves. Sanchez was also nominated by the Working Families Party. He has represented the 25th district since 2011.

2020 Connecticut State House of Representatives election, District 25
Party	Candidate	Votes	%
Democratic	Robert Sanchez (incumbent)	3,921	69.24
Republican	Jerrell Hargraves	1,503	26.54
Working Families	Robert Sanchez (incumbent)	239	4.22
Total votes		5,663	100.00
Democratic hold			

=== District 26 ===
Democratic incumbent Peter Tercyak was re-elected to a 10th term after defeating Republican candidate Piotr Ceglarz and Libertarian candidate Johnathan Milon Johnson. Tercyak has represented the 26th district since 2003.

2020 Connecticut State House of Representatives election, District 26
Party	Candidate	Votes	%
Democratic	Peter Tercyak (incumbent)	4,650	61.10
Republican	Piotr S. Ceglarz	2,420	31.80
Libertarian	Jonathan Milon Johnson	291	3.82
Working Families	Peter Tercyak (incumbent)	250	3.28
Total votes		7,611	100.00
Democratic hold			

=== District 27 ===
Democratic incumbent Gary Turco was re-elected to a 2nd term after defeating Republican candidate Michael Camillo. Turco was also nominated by the Working Families Party, while Camillo was nominated by the Independent Party. Turco has represented the 27th district since 2019.

2020 Connecticut State House of Representatives election, District 27
Party	Candidate	Votes	%
Democratic	Gary Turco (incumbent)	7,833	57.49
Republican	Michael Camillo	5,183	38.04
Working Families	Gary Turco (incumbent)	417	3.06
Independent Party	Michael Camillo	192	1.41
Total votes		13,625	100.00
Democratic hold			

=== District 28 ===
Democratic candidate Amy Morrin Bello was elected after defeating Republican candidate Patrick Pentalow and Independent Party candidate Henry Thayer.

2020 Connecticut State House of Representatives election, District 28
Party	Candidate	Votes	%
Democratic	Amy Morrin Bello (incumbent)	7,708	53.61
Republican	Patrick Pentalow	6,146	42.75
Working Families	Amy Morrin Bello (incumbent)	355	2.47
Independent Party	Henry Thayer	168	1.17
Total votes		14,377	100.00
Democratic hold			

=== District 29 ===
Democratic incumbent Kerry Szeps Wood was re-elected to a 2nd term after defeating Republican candidate Henry Vasel. Vasel was also nominated by the Independent Party. Wood has represented the 29th district since 2019.

2020 Connecticut State House of Representatives election, District 29
Party	Candidate	Votes	%
Democratic	Kerry Szeps Wood (incumbent)	7,776	57.86
Republican	Henry Vasel	5,419	40.32
Independent Party	Henry Vasel	244	1.82
Total votes		13,439	100.00
Democratic hold			

=== District 30 ===
Republican candidate Donna Veach was elected after defeating Democratic candidate JoAnn Angelico-Stetson. Angelico-Stetson was also nominated by the Working Families Party. The 30th district was previously held by former Democratic Speaker of the House Joe Aresimowicz, who had represented the 30th district since 2005. Aresimowicz decided not to run for re-election.

2020 Connecticut State House of Representatives election, District 30
Party	Candidate	Votes	%
Republican	Donna Veach	8,268	55.68
Democratic	JoAnn Angelico-Stetson	6,268	42.21
Working Families	JoAnn Angelico-Stetson	313	2.11
Total votes		14,849	100.00
Republican gain from Democratic			

=== District 31 ===
Democratic incumbent Jill Barry was re-elected to a 2nd term after defeating Republican candidate Chip Beckett. Beckett was also nominated by the Independent Party. Barry has represented the 31st district since 2019.

2020 Connecticut State House of Representatives election, District 31
Party	Candidate	Votes	%
Democratic	Jill Barry (incumbent)	8,521	53.01
Republican	Chip Beckett	7,107	44.22
Independent Party	Chip Beckett	445	2.77
Total votes		16,073	100.00
Democratic hold			

=== District 32 ===
Republican Christie Carpino was re-elected to a 6th term after running unopposed. Carpino was also nominated by the Independent Party. She has represented the 32nd district since 2011.

2020 Connecticut State House of Representatives election, District 32
Party	Candidate	Votes	%
Republican	Christie Carpino (incumbent)	8,524	77.50
Independent Party	Christie Carpino (incumbent)	2,475	22.50
Total votes		10,999	100.00
Republican hold			

=== District 33 ===
Democratic candidate Brandon Chafee was elected after defeating Republican Linda Szynkowicz. Chafee was also nominated by the Working Families Party, while Szynkowicz was nominated by the Independent party. This seat was previously held by Joseph Serra, who had represented the 33rd district since 1993. Cerra decided not to run for re-election.

2020 Connecticut State House of Representatives election, District 33
Party	Candidate	Votes	%
Democratic	Brandon Chafee	6,618	59.98
Republican	Linda Szynkowicz	3,689	33.43
Working Families	Brandon Chafee	457	4.14
Independent Party	Linda Szynkowicz	270	2.45
Total votes		11,034	100.00
Democratic hold			

=== District 34 ===
Republican incumbent Irene Haines was re-elected to a 2nd term after defeating Democratic candidate Judd Melon and Independent Party candidate Lance Lusignan. Melon was also nominated by the Working Families Party. Haines has represented the 34th district since 2019.

2020 Connecticut State House of Representatives election, District 34
Party	Candidate	Votes	%
Republican	Irene Haines (incumbent)	7,912	55.79
Democratic	Judd Melon	5,816	41.01
Working Families	Judd Melon	228	1.61
Independent Party	Lance Lusignan	227	1.60
Total votes		14,183	100.00
Republican hold			

=== District 35 ===
Democratic candidate Christine Goupil was elected after defeating Republican candidate John Hall III. Goupil was also nominated by the Independent Party and the Working Families Party. This seat was previously held by Republican Jesse MacLachlan, who had represented the 35th district since 2015. MacLahlan decided not to run for re-election.

2020 Connecticut's 35th House of Representatives district election
- Precinct results Goupil 50-60% Hall 50-60%

2020 Connecticut State House of Representatives election, District 35
Party	Candidate	Votes	%
Republican	John L. Hall III	6,793	47.78
Democratic	Christine Goupil	6,650	46.77
Green	John May	358	2.52
Independent Party	Christine Goupil	264	1.86
Working Families	Christine Goupil	153	1.08
Total votes		14,218	100.00
Democratic gain from Republican			

=== District 36 ===
Democratic incumbent Christine Palm was re-elected to a 2nd term after defeating Republican candidate Robert Siegrist. Palm was also nominated by the Working Families Party, while Siegrist was nominated by the Independent Party. Palm has represented the 36th district since 2019.

2020 Connecticut State House of Representatives election, District 36
Party	Candidate	Votes	%
Democratic	Christine Palm (incumbent)	8,104	52.66
Republican	Robert Siegrist	6,609	42.95
Independent Party	Robert Siegrist	368	2.39
Working Families	Christine Palm (incumbent)	307	2.00
Total votes		15,388	100.00
Democratic hold			

=== District 37 ===
Republican incumbent Holly Cheeseman was re-elected to a 3rd term after defeating Democratic candidate Cate Steel. Cheeseman was also nominated by the Independent Party, while Steel was nominated by the Working Families Party. Cheeseman has represented the 37th district since 2017.

2020 Connecticut State House of Representatives election, District 37
Party	Candidate	Votes	%
Republican	Holly Cheeseman (incumbent)	6,800	48.45
Democratic	Cate Steel	6,699	47.73
Independent Party	Holly Cheeseman (incumbent)	318	2.27
Working Families	Cate Steel	219	1.56
Total votes		14,036	100.00
Republican hold			

=== District 38 ===
Republican incumbent Kathleen McCarty was re-elected to 4th term after defeating Democratic candidate Baird Welch-Collins. McCarty was also nominated by the Independent Party. She has represented the 38th district since 2015.

2020 Connecticut State House of Representatives election, District 38
Party	Candidate	Votes	%
Democratic	Baird Welch-Collins	6,924	48.78
Republican	Kathleen McCarty (incumbent)	6,833	48.14
Independent Party	Kathleen McCarty (incumbent)	436	3.07
Total votes		14,193	100.00
Republican hold			

=== District 39 ===
Democratic incumbent Anthony Nolan was re-elected to a 2nd term after defeating Republican candidate Kat Goulart and Green Party candidate Erycka Ortiz. Nolan was also nominated by the Working Families Party. Nolan has represented the 39th district since 2021.

2020 Connecticut State House of Representatives election, District 39
Party	Candidate	Votes	%
Democratic	Anthony Nolan(incumbent)	4,718	71.52
Republican	Kat Goulart	1,280	19.40
Working Families	Anthony Nolan (incumbent)	361	5.47
Green	Erycka Ortiz	238	3.61
Total votes		11,034	100.00
Democratic hold			

=== District 40 ===
Democratic incumbent Christine Conley was re-elected to a 3rd term after defeating Republican candidate Lauren Gauthier. Conley was also nominated by the Working Families Party, while Gauthier was nominated by the Independent Party. Conley has represented the 40th district since 2017.

2020 Connecticut State House of Representatives election, District 40
Party	Candidate	Votes	%
Democratic	Christine Conley (incumbent)	5,011	56.15
Republican	Lauren Gauthier	3,454	38.70
Working Families	Christine Conley (incumbent)	242	2.71
Independent Party	Lauren Gauthier	217	2.43
Total votes		8,924	100.00
Democratic hold			

=== District 41 ===
Democratic incumbent Joe de la Cruz was re-elected to a 3rd term after running unopposed. De la Cruz was also nominated by the Working Families Party. He has represented the 41st district since 2017.

2020 Connecticut State House of Representatives election, District 41
Party	Candidate	Votes	%
Democratic	Joe de la Cruz (incumbent)	7,983	91.30
Working Families	Joe de la Cruz (incumbent)	761	8.70
Total votes		8,744	100.00
Democratic hold			

=== District 42 ===
Republican incumbent Mike France was re-elected to a 4th term after defeating Democratic candidate Matt Green and petitioning candidate Robert Lawrence. France was also nominated by the Independent Party, while Green was nominated by the Working Families Party. France has represented the 42nd district since 2015.

2020 Connecticut State House of Representatives election, District 42
Party	Candidate	Votes	%
Republican	Mike France (incumbent)	6,013	50.75
Democratic	Matt Green	5,134	43.33
Independent Party	Mike France (incumbent)	311	2.62
Working Families	Matt Green	294	2.48
Petitioning	Robert W. Lawrence	96	0.81
Total votes		11,848	100.00
Republican hold			

=== District 43 ===
Republican Greg Howard was elected after defeating 1st term incumbent Democrat Kate Rotella. Howard was also nominated by the Independent Party. Rotella had represented the 43rd district since 2019.

2020 Connecticut State House of Representatives election, District 43
Party	Candidate	Votes	%
Democratic	Kate Rotella (incumbent)	7,348	49.02
Republican	Greg Howard	7,075	47.19
Independent Party	Greg Howard	568	3.79
Total votes		14,991	100.00
Republican gain from Democratic			

=== District 44 ===
Republican incumbent Anne Dauphinais was re-elected to a 3rd term after defeating Democratic candidate Christine Rosati Randall. Dauphinais was also nominated by the Independent Party, while Rosati was nominated by the Working Families Party. Dauphinais has represented the 44th district since 2017.

2020 Connecticut State House of Representatives election, District 44
Party	Candidate	Votes	%
Republican	Anne Dauphinais (incumbent)	6,206	57.12
Democratic	Christine Rosati Randall	4,012	36.93
Independent Party	Anne Dauphinais (incumbent)	339	3.12
Working Families	Christine Rosati Randall	308	2.83
Total votes		10,865	100.00
Republican hold			

=== District 45 ===
Republican incumbent Brian Lanoue was re-elected to a 2nd term after defeating Democratic candidate Mark DePonte and Independent Party candidate Daniel Reale. Lanoue has represented the 45th district since 2019.

2020 Connecticut State House of Representatives election, District 45
Party	Candidate	Votes	%
Republican	Brian Lanoue (incumbent)	6,640	56.57
Democratic	Mark DePonte	4,790	40.81
Independent Party	Daniel Reale	308	2.62
Total votes		11,768	100.00
Republican hold			

=== District 46 ===
Democratic incumbent Emmett Riley was re-elected to a 5th term after defeating Republican candidate Robert Bell. Riley was also nominated by the Working Families Party, while Bell was nominated Independent Party. Riley has represented the 46th district since 2013.

2020 Connecticut State House of Representatives election, District 46
Party	Candidate	Votes	%
Democratic	Emmett Riley (incumbent)	4,625	58.66
Republican	Robert Bell	2,711	34.38
Working Families	Emmett Riley (incumbent)	293	3.72
Independent Party	Robert Bell	256	3.25
Total votes		7,885	100.00
Democratic hold			

=== District 47 ===
Republican incumbent Doug Dubitsky was re-elected to a 4th term after defeating Democratic candidate Kate Donnelly. Dubitsky was also nominated by the Independent Party, while Donnelly was nominated by the Working Families Party. Dubitsky has represented the 47th district since 2015.

2020 Connecticut State House of Representatives election, District 47
Party	Candidate	Votes	%
Republican	Doug Dubitsky (incumbent)	7,315	53.97
Democratic	Kate Donnelly	5,556	40.99
Independent Party	Doug Dubitsky (incumbent)	357	2.63
Working Families	Kate Donnelly	326	2.41
Total votes		13,554	100.00
Republican hold			

=== District 48 ===
Democratic incumbent Brian Smith was re-elected to a 2nd term after defeating Republican candidate Julie Shilosky. Smith was also nominated by the Working Families Party, while Shilosky was nominated by the Independent Party. Smith has represented the 48th district since 2020.

2020 Connecticut State House of Representatives election, District 48
Party	Candidate	Votes	%
Democratic	Brian Smith (incumbent)	6,920	50.71
Republican	Julie Shilosky	6,038	44.24
Working Families	Brian Smith (incumbent)	358	2.62
Independent Party	Julie Shilosky	331	2.43
Total votes		13,647	100.00
Democratic hold			

=== District 49 ===
Democratic incumbent Susan Johnson was re-elected to a 9th term after running unopposed. Johnson was also nominated by the Working Families Party. John has represented the 49th district since 2009.

2020 Connecticut State House of Representatives election, District 49
Party	Candidate	Votes	%
Democratic	Susan Johnson (incumbent)	4,900	87.00
Working Families	Susan Johnson (incumbent)	732	13.00
Total votes		5,632	100.00
Democratic hold			

=== District 50 ===
Democratic incumbent Pat Boyd was re-elected to a 3rd term after running unopposed. Boyd has represented the 50th district since 2017.

2020 Connecticut State House of Representatives election, District 50
Party	Candidate	Votes	%
Democratic	Pat Boyd (incumbent)	8,564	100.00
Democratic hold			

=== District 51 ===
Republican incumbent Rick Hayes was re-elected to a 2nd term after defeating Democratic candidate Larry Groh Jr. Hayes was also nominated by the Independent Party. He has represented the 51st district since 2019.

2020 Connecticut State House of Representatives election, District 51
Party	Candidate	Votes	%
Republican	Rick Hayes (incumbent)	6,158	53.30
Democratic	Larry Groh Jr.	4,961	42.94
Independent Party	Rick Hayes (incumbent)	435	3.76
Total votes		11,554	100.00
Republican hold			

=== District 52 ===
Republican incumbent Kurt Vail was re-elected to a 4th term after defeating Democratic candidate Greg Post. Vail was also nominated by the Independent Party, while Post was nominated by the Working Families Party. Vail has represented the 52nd district since 2015.

2020 Connecticut State House of Representatives election, District 52
Party	Candidate	Votes	%
Republican	Kurt Vail (incumbent)	7,205	61.18
Democratic	Greg Post	3,963	33.65
Independent Party	Kurt Vail (incumbent)	401	3.40
Working Families	Greg Post	208	1.77
Total votes		13,554	100.00
Republican hold			

=== District 53 ===
Republican candidate Tammy Nuccio was elected after defeating 1st term Democratic incumbent Pat Wilson Pheanious. Nuccio was also nominated by the Independent Party, while Pheanious was nominated by the Working Families Party. Pheanious had represented the 53rd district since 2019.

2020 Connecticut State House of Representatives election, District 53
Party	Candidate	Votes	%
Republican	Tammy Nuccio	6,768	48.82
Democratic	Pat Wilson Pheanious (incumbent)	6,396	46.14
Independent Party	Tammy Nuccio	400	2.89
Working Families	Pat Wilson Pheanious (incumbent)	299	2.16
Total votes		13,863	100.00
Republican gain from Democratic			

=== District 54 ===
Democratic incumbent Gregory Haddad was re-elected to a 6th term after running unopposed. Haddad was also nominated by the Working Families Party. He has represented the 54th district since 2011.

2020 Connecticut State House of Representatives election, District 54
Party	Candidate	Votes	%
Democratic	Gregory Haddad (incumbent)	4,491	90.16
Working Families	Gregory Haddad (incumbent)	490	9.84
Total votes		4,899	100.00
Democratic hold			

=== District 55 ===
Republican incumbent Robin Green was re-elected to a third term after defeating Democratic candidate John Collins and petitioning candidate Salvatore V. Sena Jr. Green has represented the 55th district since 2017.

2020 Connecticut State House of Representatives election, District 55
Party	Candidate	Votes	%
Republican	Robin Green (incumbent)	7,491	49.05
Democratic	John Collins	7,125	46.65
Petitioning	Salvatore V. Sena Jr.	656	4.30
Total votes		15,272	100.00
Republican hold			

=== District 56 ===
Democratic incumbent Michael Winkler was re-elected to a third term after defeating Republican candidate Laura B. Bush. Winkler was also nominated by the Working Families Party, while Bush was nominated by the Independent Party. Winkler has represented the 56th district since 2017.

2020 Connecticut State House of Representatives election, District 56
Party	Candidate	Votes	%
Democratic	Michael Winkler (incumbent)	6,594	55.19
Republican	Laura B. Bush	4,782	40.03
Working Families	Michael Winkler (incumbent)	287	2.40
Independent Party	Laura B. Bush	284	2.38
Total votes		11,947	100.00
Democratic hold			

=== District 57 ===
Democratic candidate Jaime Foster was elected after defeating Republican candidate David Stevens. Foster was also nominated by the Working Families Party and the Independent Party. The seat was previously held by Republican Christoper Davis, who had represented the 57th district since 2011.

2020 Connecticut State House of Representatives election, District 57
Party	Candidate	Votes	%
Republican	David E. Stavens	6,346	48.29
Democratic	Jaime Foster	6,191	47.11
Independent Party	Jaime Foster	326	2.48
Working Families	Jaime Foster	278	2.12
Total votes		13,141	100.00
Democratic gain from Republican			

=== District 58 ===
Democratic incumbent Tom Arnone was re-elected to a 2nd term after defeating Republican candidate Mary Ann Turner. Arnone was also nominated by the Working Families Party. Arnone has represented the 58th district since 2019.

2020 Connecticut State House of Representatives election, District 58
Party	Candidate	Votes	%
Democratic	Tom Arnone (incumbent)	5,608	52.40
Republican	Mary Ann Turner	4,711	44.02
Working Families	Tom Arnone (incumbent)	384	3.59
Total votes		10,703	100.00
Democratic hold			

=== District 59 ===
Republican incumbent Carol Hall was re-elected to a 3rd term after defeating Democratic candidate Gerald Calnen. Hall was also nominated by the Independent Party. She has represented the 59th district since 2017.

2020 Connecticut State House of Representatives election, District 59
Party	Candidate	Votes	%
Republican	Carol Hall (incumbent)	5,407	49.71
Democratic	Gerald Calnen	5,006	46.03
Independent Party	Carol Hall (incumbent)	463	4.26
Total votes		10,876	100.00
Republican hold			

=== District 60 ===
Democratic incumbent Jane Garibay was re-elected to a 2nd term after defeating Republican candidate Scott Storms. Storms was also nominated by the Independent Party. She has represented the 60th district since 2019.

2020 Connecticut State House of Representatives election, District 60
Party	Candidate	Votes	%
Democratic	Jane Garibay (incumbent)	7,274	54.76
Republican	Scott A. Storms	5,450	41.03
Independent Party	Scott A. Storms	559	4.21
Total votes		13,283	100.00
Democratic hold			

=== District 61 ===
Republican incumbent Tami Zawistowski was re-elected to a 5th term after defeating Democratic candidate Jack Henrie. Zawistowski was also nominated by the Independent Party. Zawistowski has represented the 61st term since 2014.

2020 Connecticut State House of Representatives election, District 61
Party	Candidate	Votes	%
Republican	Tami Zawistowski (incumbent)	7,242	54.10
Democratic	Jack Henrie	5,535	41.35
Independent Party	Tami Zawistowski (incumbent)	609	4.55
Total votes		13,386	100.00
Republican hold			

=== District 62 ===
Republican candidate Mark Anderson was elected after defeating Democratic candidate Audrey Lampert. Anderson was also nominated by the Independent Party. This seat was previously held by Republican William Simanski since 2011.

2020 Connecticut State House of Representatives election, District 62
Party	Candidate	Votes	%
Republican	Mark W. Anderson	8,200	53.50
Democratic	Audrey Lampert	6,713	43.80
Independent Party	Mark W. Anderson	413	2.69
Total votes		15,326	100.00
Republican hold			

=== District 63 ===
Republican incumbent Jay Case was re-elected to a 5th term after defeating Democratic candidate Noel Rodriquez. Rodriquez was also nominated by the Independent Party. Case has represented the 63rd district since 2013.

2020 Connecticut State House of Representatives election, District 63
Party	Candidate	Votes	%
Republican	Jay Case (incumbent)	7,981	68.77
Democratic	Noel Rodriquez	3,326	28.66
Independent Party	Noel Rodriquez	298	2.57
Total votes		11,605	100.00
Republican hold			

=== District 64 ===
Democratic incumbent Maria Horn was re-elected to a 2nd term after defeating Republican candidate Brian Ohler. Horn was also nominated by the Working Families Party, while Ohler was nominated by the Independent Party. Horn has represented the 64th district since 2019.

2020 Connecticut State House of Representatives election, District 64
Party	Candidate	Votes	%
Democratic	Maria Horn (incumbent)	6,867	49.66
Republican	Brian M. Ohler	6,205	44.88
Independent Party	Brian M. Ohler	470	3.40
Working Families	Maria Horn (incumbent)	285	2.06
Total votes		13,827	100.00
Democratic hold			

=== District 65 ===
Democratic incumbent Michelle Cook was re-elected to a 7th term after defeating Republican candidate Christopher Beyus and Green Party candidate Don Vaniah Alexander. Cook was also nominated by the Working Families Party, while Beyus was nominated by the Independent Party. Cook has represented the 65th district since 2009.

2020 Connecticut State House of Representatives election, District 65
Party	Candidate	Votes	%
Democratic	Michelle Cook (incumbent)	4,401	47.53
Republican	Christopher Beyus	4,221	45.59
Working Families	Michelle Cook (incumbent)	327	3.53
Independent Party	Christopher Beyus	256	2.76
Green	Don Vaniah Alexander	54	0.58
Total votes		9,259	100.00
Democratic hold			

=== District 66 ===
Republican incumbent David Wilson was re-elected to a 3rd term after defeating Democratic candidate Matthew Dyer. Wilson was also nominated by the Independent Party, while Dyer was nominated by the Working Families Party. Wilson has represented the 66th district since 2017.

2020 Connecticut State House of Representatives election, District 66
Party	Candidate	Votes	%
Republican	David T. Wilson (incumbent)	8,209	55.34
Democratic	Matthew D. Dyer	6,122	41.27
Independent Party	David T. Wilson (incumbent)	291	1.96
Working Families	Matthew D. Dyer	212	1.43
Total votes		14,834	100.00
Republican hold			

=== District 67 ===
Republican incumbent Bill Buckbee was re-elected to a 3rd term after defeating Democratic candidate Hilary Ram. Buckbee was also nominated by the Independent Party, while Ram was nominated by the Working Families Party. Buckbee has represented the 67th district since 2017.

2020 Connecticut State House of Representatives election, District 67
Party	Candidate	Votes	%
Republican	Bill Buckbee (incumbent)	7,221	56.10
Democratic	Hilary Ram	4,856	37.73
Independent Party	Bill Buckbee (incumbent)	589	4.58
Working Families	Hilary Ram	205	1.59
Total votes		12,871	100.00
Republican hold			

=== District 68 ===
Republican incumbent Joe Polletta was re-elected to a 3rd term after defeating Democratic candidate Sean Butterly. Polletta was also nominated by the Independent Party. Polletta has represented the 68th district since 2017.

2020 Connecticut State House of Representatives election, District 68
Party	Candidate	Votes	%
Republican	Joseph Polletta (incumbent)	8,458	64.59
Democratic	Sean Butterly	4,342	33.16
Independent Party	Joseph Polletta (incumbent)	295	2.25
Total votes		13,095	100.00
Republican hold			

=== District 69 ===
Republican candidate Cindy Harrison was elected after defeating Democratic candidate Michele Zommer. This seat was previously held by Republican Arthur O'Neill since 1989.

2020 Connecticut State House of Representatives election, District 69
Party	Candidate	Votes	%
Republican	Cindy Harrison	7,972	51.55
Democratic	Michele Zommer	7,493	48.45
Total votes		15,465	100.00
Republican hold			

=== District 70 ===
Republican incumbent Rosa Rebimbas was re-elected to a 7th term after defeating Democratic candidate Stephen Samela. Rebimbas has represented the 70th district since 2009.

2020 Connecticut State House of Representatives election, District 70
Party	Candidate	Votes	%
Republican	Rosa Rebimbas (incumbent)	6,547	59.89
Democratic	Stephen Samela	4,384	40.11
Total votes		10,931	100.00
Republican hold			

=== District 71 ===
Republican incumbent Anthony D'Amelio was re-elected to a 14th term after running unopposed. D'Amelio has represented the 71st district since 1996.

2020 Connecticut State House of Representatives election, District 71
Party	Candidate	Votes	%
Republican	Anthony D'Amelio (incumbent)	7,501	100.00
Republican hold			

=== District 72 ===
Democratic incumbent Larry Butler was re-elected to an 8th term after defeating Republican candidate Vernon Matthews. Butler was also nominated by the Independent Party. He has represented the 72nd district since 2007.

2020 Connecticut State House of Representatives election, District 72
Party	Candidate	Votes	%
Democratic	Larry Butler (incumbent)	4,269	69.18
Republican	Vernon R. Matthews	1,668	27.03
Independent Party	Larry Butler (incumbent)	234	3.79
Total votes		6,171	100.00
Democratic hold			

=== District 73 ===
Democratic incumbent Ronald Napoli Jr. was re-elected to a 2nd term after running unopposed. Napoli was also nominated by the Independent Party and the Working Families Party. He has represented the 73rd district since 2019.

2020 Connecticut State House of Representatives election, District 73
Party	Candidate	Votes	%
Democratic	Ronald Napoli Jr. (incumbent)	5,702	80.39
Independent Party	Ronald Napoli Jr. (incumbent)	1,029	14.51
Working Families	Ronald Napoli Jr. (incumbent)	362	5.10
Total votes		7,093	100.00
Democratic hold			

=== District 74 ===
Democratic candidate Michael DiGiovancarlo was elected after defeating 2nd term Republican incumbent Stephanie Cummings. DiGiovancarlo was also nominated by the Working Families Party, while Cummings was nominated by the Independent Party. Cummings had represented the 74th district since 2017.

2020 Connecticut State House of Representatives election, District 74
Party	Candidate	Votes	%
Democratic	Michael DiGiovancarlo	4,261	50.56
Republican	Stephanie Cummings (incumbent)	3,539	42.00
Independent Party	Stephanie Cummings (incumbent)	431	5.11
Working Families	Michael DiGiovancarlo	196	2.33
Total votes		8,427	100.00
Democratic gain from Republican			

=== District 75 ===
Democratic incumbent Geraldo Reyes Jr. was re-elected to a 4th term after running unopposed. Reyes has represented the 75th district since 2016.

2020 Connecticut State House of Representatives election, District 75
Party	Candidate	Votes	%
Democratic	Geraldo Reyes Jr. (incumbent)	3,542	100.00
Democratic hold			

=== District 76 ===
Republican incumbent John Piscopo was re-elected to a 17th term after defeating Democratic candidate Paul Honig. Piscopo was also nominated by the Independent Party. He has represented the 76th district since 1989.

2020 Connecticut State House of Representatives election, District 76
Party	Candidate	Votes	%
Republican	John Piscopo (incumbent)	8,779	59.11
Democratic	Paul Honig	5,676	38.22
Independent Party	John Piscopo (incumbent)	396	2.67
Total votes		11,805	100.00
Republican hold			

=== District 77 ===
Republican incumbent Cara Pavalock-D'Amato was re-elected to a 4th term after defeating Democratic candidate Andrew Rasmussen-Taylor. Pavalock-D'Amato was also nominated by the Independent Party. She has represented the 77th district since 2015.

2020 Connecticut State House of Representatives election, District 77
Party	Candidate	Votes	%
Republican	Cara Pavalock-D'Amato (incumbent)	6,079	49.43
Democratic	Andrew M. Rasmussen-Tuller	5,788	47.07
Independent Party	Cara Pavalock-D'Amato (incumbent)	430	3.50
Total votes		12,297	100.00
Republican hold			

=== District 78 ===
Republican incumbent Whit Betts was re-elected to a 6th term after defeating Independent Party candidate Aileen Abrams. Betts has represented the 78th district since 2011.

2020 Connecticut State House of Representatives election, District 78
Party	Candidate	Votes	%
Republican	Whit Betts (incumbent)	8,376	74.94
Independent Party	Aileen Abrams	2,801	25.06
Total votes		11,177	100.00
Republican hold			

=== District 79 ===
Democratic incumbent Christopher Ziogas was re-elected to a 3rd term after defeating Republican candidate David Rackliffe. Rackliffe was also nominated by the Independent Party. Ziogas has represented the 79th district since 2017.

2020 Connecticut State House of Representatives election, District 79
Party	Candidate	Votes	%
Democratic	Christopher Ziogas (incumbent)	5,450	52.62
Republican	David Rackliffe	4,593	44.34
Independent Party	David Rackliffe	315	3.04
Total votes		10,358	100.00
Democratic hold			

=== District 80 ===
Republican incumbent Gale Mastrofrancesco was re-elected to a 2nd term after defeating Democratic candidate John Corky Mazurek. Mazurek was also nominated by the Independent Party. Mastrofrancesco has represented the 80th district since 2019.

2020 Connecticut State House of Representatives election, District 80
Party	Candidate	Votes	%
Republican	Gale Mastrofrancesco (incumbent)	8,559	61.82
Democratic	John Corky Mazurek	4,734	34.19
Independent Party	John Corky Mazurek	553	3.99
Total votes		13,846	100.00
Republican hold			

=== District 81 ===
Republican incumbent John Fusco was re-elected to a 3rd term after defeating Democratic candidate Dagmara Scalise. Fusco was also nominated by the Independent Party. He has represented the 81st district since 2017.

2020 Connecticut State House of Representatives election, District 81
Party	Candidate	Votes	%
Republican	John Fusco (incumbent)	7,377	55.04
Democratic	Dagmara Scalise	5,542	41.35
Independent Party	John Fusco (incumbent)	483	3.60
Total votes		13,402	100.00
Republican hold			

=== District 82 ===
Democratic candidate Michael Quinn was elected after defeating Republican candidate Mike Skelps and Independent Party candidate Ernestine Holloway. Quinn was also nominated by the Working Families Party. This seat was previously held by Democrat Emil Altobello since 1995.

2020 Connecticut State House of Representatives election, District 82
Party	Candidate	Votes	%
Democratic	Michael D. Quinn	5,810	49.40
Republican	Mike Skelps	5,227	44.44
Independent Party	Ernestine Holloway	412	3.50
Working Families	Michael D. Quinn	313	2.66
Total votes		11,762	100.00
Democratic hold			

=== District 83 ===
Democratic incumbent Catherine Abercrombie was re-elected to a 9th term after defeating Republican candidate Lou Arata. Arata was also nominated by the Independent Party. Abercrombie has represented the 83rd district since 2005.

2020 Connecticut State House of Representatives election, District 83
Party	Candidate	Votes	%
Democratic	Catherine Abercrombie (incumbent)	6,143	51.40
Republican	Lou Arata	5,556	46.49
Independent Party	Lou Arata	253	2.12
Total votes		11,952	100.00
Democratic hold			

=== District 84 ===
Democratic incumbent Hilda Santiago was re-elected to a 5th term after defeating Republican candidate Richard Cordero. Santiago was also nominated by the Working Families Party. She has represented the 84th district since 2013.

2020 Connecticut State House of Representatives election, District 84
Party	Candidate	Votes	%
Democratic	Hilda Santiago (incumbent)	4,108	63.85
Republican	Richard Cordero	2,022	31.43
Working Families	Hilda Santiago (incumbent)	304	4.72
Total votes		6,434	100.00
Democratic hold			

=== District 85 ===
Democratic incumbent Mary Mushinsky was re-elected to a 21st term after defeating Republican candidate Weston Ulbrich. Mushinsky was also nominated by the Working Families Party, while Ulbrich was nominated by the Independent Party. Mushinsky has represented the 85th district since 1981.

2020 Connecticut State House of Representatives election, District 85
Party	Candidate	Votes	%
Democratic	Mary Mushinsky (incumbent)	6,057	51.15
Republican	Weston Ulbrich	5,383	45.46
Independent Party	Weston Ulbrich	203	1.71
Working Families	Mary Mushinsky (incumbent)	198	1.67
Total votes		11,841	100.00
Democratic hold			

=== District 86 ===
Republican incumbent Vincent Candelora was re-elected to an 8th term after defeating Democratic candidate Vincent Mase. Candelora was also nominated by the Independent Party. He became House Minority Leader on January 6, 2021. He has represented the 86th district since 2007.

2020 Connecticut State House of Representatives election, District 86
Party	Candidate	Votes	%
Republican	Vincent Candelora (incumbent)	8,497	61.37
Democratic	Vincent J. Mase Sr.	4,783	34.54
Independent Party	Vincent Candelora (incumbent)	566	4.09
Total votes		13,846	100.00
Republican hold			

=== District 87 ===
Republican incumbent Dave Yaccarino was re-elected to a 6th term after defeating Democratic candidate Kathy Grant. Yaccarino was also nominated by the Independent Party, while Grant was nominated by the Working Families Party.

2020 Connecticut State House of Representatives election, District 87
Party	Candidate	Votes	%
Republican	Dave Yaccarino (incumbent)	9,760	64.30
Democratic	Kathy Grant	4,589	30.23
Independent Party	Dave Yaccarino (incumbent)	615	4.05
Working Families	Kathy Grant	216	1.42
Total votes		15,180	100.00
Republican hold			

=== District 88 ===
Democratic incumbent Josh Elliott was re-elected to a 3rd term after defeating Republican candidate Kathleen Hoyt. Elliott was also nominated by the Working Families Party. He has represented the 88th district since 2017.

2020 Connecticut State House of Representatives election, District 88
Party	Candidate	Votes	%
Democratic	Josh Elliott (incumbent)	6,392	63.51
Republican	Kathleen Hoyt	3,355	33.33
Working Families	Josh Elliott (incumbent)	318	3.16
Total votes		9,676	100.00
Democratic hold			

=== District 89 ===
Republican incumbent Lezlye Zupkus was re-elected to a 5th term after defeating Democratic candidate E.J. Maher. Zupkus was also nominated by the Independent Party. She has represented the 89th district since 2013.

2020 Connecticut State House of Representatives election, District 89
Party	Candidate	Votes	%
Republican	Lezlye Zupkus (incumbent)	8,870	60.27
Democratic	E.J. Maher	5,351	36.36
Independent Party	Lezlye Zupkus (incumbent)	496	3.37
Total votes		14,717	100.00
Republican hold			

=== District 90 ===
Republican incumbent Craig C. Fishbein was re-elected to a 4th term after defeating Democratic candidate Jim Jinks. Fishbein was also nominated by the Independent Party, while Jinks was nominated by the Working Families Party. Fishbein has represented the 90th district since 2016.

2020 Connecticut State House of Representatives election, District 91
Party	Candidate	Votes	%
Republican	Craig C. Fishbein (incumbent)	6,748	47.85
Democratic	Jim Jinks	6,703	47.53
Working Families	Jim Jinks	345	2.45
Independent Party	Craig Fishbein (incumbent)	307	2.18
Total votes		14,103	100.00
Republican hold			

=== District 91 ===
Democratic incumbent Michael D'Agostino was re-elected to a 5th term after defeating petitioning candidate Weruche George. D'Agostino has represented the 91st district since 2013.

2020 Connecticut State House of Representatives election, District 91
Party	Candidate	Votes	%
Democratic	Michael D'Agostino (incumbent)	9,680	88.91
Petitioning	Weruche U. George	1,208	11.09
Total votes		10,888	100.00
Democratic hold			

=== District 92 ===
Democratic incumbent Patricia Dillon was re-elected to a 19th term after running unopposed. Dillon was also nominated by the Working Families Party. She has represented the 82nd district since 1985.

2020 Connecticut State House of Representatives election, District 92
Party	Candidate	Votes	%
Democratic	Patricia Dillon (incumbent)	7,696	92.64
Working Families	Patricia Dillon (incumbent)	611	7.36
Total votes		8,307	100.00
Democratic hold			

=== District 93 ===
Democratic incumbent Toni Walker was re-elected to an 11th term after running unopposed. Walker has represented the 93rd district since 2001.

2020 Connecticut State House of Representatives election, District 93
Party	Candidate	Votes	%
Democratic	Toni Walker (incumbent)	5,816	100.00
Democratic hold			

=== District 94 ===
Democratic incumbent Robyn Porter was re-elected to a 5th term after running unopposed. Porter has represented the 94th district since 2014.

2020 Connecticut State House of Representatives election, District 94
Party	Candidate	Votes	%
Democratic	Robyn Porter (incumbent)	7,536	100.00
Democratic hold			

=== District 95 ===
Democratic incumbent Juan Candelaria was re-elected to a 10th term after running unopposed. Candelaria has represented the 95th district since 2003.

2020 Connecticut State House of Representatives election, District 95
Party	Candidate	Votes	%
Democratic	Juan Candelaria (incumbent)	4,129	100.00
Democratic hold			

=== District 96 ===
Democratic incumbent Roland Lemar was re-elected to a 6th term after defeating Republican candidate Eric Mastroianni. Lemar was also nominated by the Working Families Party, while Mastroianni was nominated by the Independent Party. Lemar has represented the 96th district since 2011.

2020 Connecticut State House of Representatives election, District 96
Party	Candidate	Votes	%
Democratic	Roland Lemar (incumbent)	6,797	69.78
Republican	Eric Michael Mastroianni Sr.	2,152	22.09
Working Families	Roland Lemar (incumbent)	638	6.55
Independent Party	Eric Michael Mastroianni Sr.	154	1.58
Total votes		9,741	100.00
Democratic hold			

=== District 97 ===
Democratic incumbent Alphonese Paolillo was re-elected to a 3rd term after defeating Republican candidate Erin Reilly. Reilly was also nominated by the Independent Party. Paolillo has represented the 97th district since 2017.

2020 Connecticut State House of Representatives election, District 97
Party	Candidate	Votes	%
Democratic	Alphonse Paolillo (incumbent)	6,042	76.08
Republican	Erin Reilly	1,745	21.97
Independent Party	Erin Reilly	155	1.95
Total votes		11,952	100.00
Democratic hold			

=== District 98 ===
Democratic incumbent Sean Scanlon was re-elected to a 4th term after running unopposed. Scanlon was also nominated by the Working Families Party. He has represented the 98th district since 2015.

2020 Connecticut State House of Representatives election, District 98
Party	Candidate	Votes	%
Democratic	Sean Scanlon (incumbent)	10,464	90.72
Working Families	Sean Scanlon (incumbent)	1,070	9.28
Total votes		11,534	100.00
Democratic hold			

=== District 99 ===
Republican incumbent Joe Zullo was re-elected to a 2nd term after defeating Democratic candidate Dave Yaccarino. Zullo was also nominated by the Independent Party, while Yaccarino was nominated by the Working Families Party. Zullo has represented the 99th district since 2019.

2020 Connecticut State House of Representatives election, District 99
Party	Candidate	Votes	%
Republican	Joe Zullo (incumbent)	6,364	55.00
Democratic	Dave Yaccarino	4,551	39.33
Independent Party	Joe Zullo (incumbent)	411	3.55
Working Families	Dave Yaccarino	244	2.11
Total votes		11,570	100.00
Republican hold			

=== District 100 ===
Democratic incumbent Quentin Phipps was re-elected to a 2nd term after defeating Republican candidate Tony Gennaro. Phipps was also nominated by the Working Families Party. He has represented the 100th district since 2019.

2020 Connecticut State House of Representatives election, District 100
Party	Candidate	Votes	%
Democratic	Quentin Phipps (incumbent)	6,892	60.58
Republican	Tony Gennaro	3,945	34.68
Working Families	Quentin Phipps (incumbent)	539	4.74
Total votes		11,376	100.00
Democratic hold			

=== District 101 ===
Democratic candidate John-Michael Parker was elected after defeating 5th term Republican incumbent Noreen Kokoruda. Parker was also nominated by the Independent Party and the Working Families Party. Kokoruda had represented the 101st district since 2011.

2020 Connecticut State House of Representatives election, District 101
Party	Candidate	Votes	%
Democratic	John-Michael Parker	7,683	50.07
Republican	Noreen Kokoruda (incumbent)	7,102	46.29
Independent Party	John-Michael Parker	360	2.35
Working Families	John-Michael Parker	198	1.29
Total votes		15,343	100.00
Democratic gain from Republican			

=== District 102 ===
Democratic incumbent Robin Comey was re-elected to a 2nd term after defeating Republican candidate Marc Riccio. Comey was also nominated by the Working Families Party, while Riccio was nominated by the Independent Party. Comey has represented the 102nd district since 2019.

2020 Connecticut State House of Representatives election, District 102
Party	Candidate	Votes	%
Democratic	Robin Comey (incumbent)	7,770	55.39
Republican	Marc Riccio	5,687	40.54
Working Families	Robin Comey (incumbent)	327	2.33
Independent Party	Marc Riccio	245	1.75
Total votes		14,029	100.00
Democratic hold			

=== District 103 ===
Democratic incumbent Liz Linehan was re-elected to a 3rd term after defeating Republican candidate Pam Salamone. Salamone was also nominated by the Independent Party. Linehan has represented the 103rd district since 2017.

2020 Connecticut State House of Representatives election, District 103
Party	Candidate	Votes	%
Democratic	Liz Linehan (incumbent)	6,355	50.48
Republican	Pam Salamone	5,957	47.32
Independent Party	Pam Salamone	278	2.21
Total votes		12,590	100.00
Democratic hold			

=== District 104 ===
Democratic incumbent Kara Rochelle was re-elected to 2nd term after defeating Republican candidate Myra Rivers. Rochelle was also nominated by the Independent Party and the Working Families Party. Rochelle has represented the 104th district since 2019.

2020 Connecticut State House of Representatives election, District 104
Party	Candidate	Votes	%
Democratic	Kara Rochelle (incumbent)	5,346	53.92
Republican	Myra Rivers	4,004	40.39
Independent Party	Kara Rochelle (incumbent)	329	3.32
Working Families	Kara Rochelle (incumbent)	235	2.37
Total votes		9,914	100.00
Democratic hold			

=== District 105 ===
Republican incumbent Nicole Klarides-Ditria was re-elected to a 3rd term after defeating Democratic candidate Christopher Bowen. Klarides-Ditria has represented the 105th district since 2017.

2020 Connecticut State House of Representatives election, District 105
Party	Candidate	Votes	%
Republican	Nicole Klarides-Ditria (incumbent)	8,997	67.13
Democratic	Christopher E. Bowen	4,405	32.87
Total votes		13,402	100.00
Republican hold			

=== District 106 ===
Republican incumbent Mitch Bolinsky was re-elected to a 5th term after defeating Democratic candidate Rebekah Harriman-Stites. Harriman-Stites was also nominated by the Working Families Party. Bolinsky has represented the 106th district since 2013.

2020 Connecticut State House of Representatives election, District 106
Party	Candidate	Votes	%
Republican	Mitch Bolinsky (incumbent)	7,331	51.36
Democratic	Rebekah Harriman-Stites	6,658	46.64
Working Families	Rebekah Harriman-Stites	286	2.00
Total votes		14,275	100.00
Republican hold			

=== District 107 ===
Republican incumbent Stephen Harding was re-elected to a 4th term after defeating Democratic candidate Kerri Colombo. Harding was also nominated by the Independent Party, while Colombo was nominated by the Working Families Party. Harding has represented the 107th district since 2015.

2020 Connecticut State House of Representatives election, District 107
Party	Candidate	Votes	%
Republican	Stephen Harding (incumbent)	8,248	54.70
Democratic	Kerri Colombo	6,086	40.36
Independent Party	Stephen Harding (incumbent)	486	3.22
Working Families	Kerri Colombo	259	1.72
Total votes		15,080	100.00
Republican hold			

=== District 108 ===
Republican candidate Patrick Callahan was elected after defeating Democratic candidate Danette Onofrio. This seat was previously held by Republican Richard Smith since 2011.

2020 Connecticut State House of Representatives election, District 107
Party	Candidate	Votes	%
Republican	Patrick Callahan	7,002	54.83
Democratic	Danette Onofrio	5,768	45.17
Total votes		12,770	100.00
Republican hold			

=== District 109 ===
Democratic incumbent David Arconti was re-elected to a 5th term after defeating Republican candidate Michael Henry. Arconti was also nominated by the Working Families Party, while Henry was nominated by the Independent Party. Arconti has represented the 109th district since 2013.

2020 Connecticut State House of Representatives election, District 109
Party	Candidate	Votes	%
Democratic	David Arconti (incumbent)	5,169	58.18
Republican	Michael Henry	3,273	36.84
Working Families	David Arconti (incumbent)	298	3.35
Independent Party	Michael Henry	144	1.62
Total votes		8,884	100.00
Democratic hold			

=== District 110 ===
Democratic incumbent and House Speaker pro tempore Bob Godfrey was re-elected to a 17th term after defeating Republican candidate Erin Domenech. Godfrey was also nominated by the Working Families Party, while Domenech was nominated by the Independent Party. Godfrey has represented the 110th district since 1989 and has served as Speaker pro tempore since 2017.

2020 Connecticut State House of Representatives election, District 110
Party	Candidate	Votes	%
Democratic	Bob Godfrey (incumbent)	4,013	65.57
Republican	Erin M. Domenech	1,808	29.54
Working Families	Bob Godfrey (incumbent)	194	3.17
Independent Party	Erin M. Domenech	105	1.72
Total votes		6,120	100.00
Democratic hold			

=== District 111 ===
Democratic candidate Aimee Berger-Girvalo was elected after defeating Republican candidate Bob Hebert. Hebert was also nominated by the Independent Party. This seat was previously held by Republican John H. Frey since 1999.

2020 Connecticut State House of Representatives election, District 111
Party	Candidate	Votes	%
Democratic	Aimee Berger-Girvalo	8,044	52.41
Republican	Bob Hebert	6,844	44.59
Independent Party	Bob Hebert	461	3.00
Total votes		15,349	100.00
Democratic gain from Republican			

=== District 112 ===
Republican incumbent J.P. Sredsinski was re-elected to a 4th term after running unopposed. Sredsinski was also nominated by the Independent Party. He has represented the 112th district since 2015.

2020 Connecticut State House of Representatives election, District 112
Party	Candidate	Votes	%
Republican	J.P. Sredzinski (incumbent)	8,569	81.41
Independent Party	J.P. Sredzinski (incumbent)	1,957	18.59
Total votes		10,526	100.00
Republican hold			

=== District 113 ===
Republican incumbent Jason Perillo was re-elected to an 8th term after defeating Democratic candidate Elaine Matto. Perillo has represented the 113th district since 2007.

2020 Connecticut State House of Representatives election, District 113
Party	Candidate	Votes	%
Republican	Jason Perillo (incumbent)	8,010	64.12
Democratic	Elaine Matto	4,483	35.88
Total votes		12,493	100.00
Republican hold			

=== District 114 ===
Democratic candidate Mary Welander was elected after defeating Republican candidate Dan DeBarba. Welander was also nominated by the Working Families Party, while DeBarba was nominated by the Independent Party. This seat was previously held by Republican Themis Klarides since 1999. Klarides had served as House Minority Leader from 2015 to 2021.

2020 Connecticut State House of Representatives election, District 114
Party	Candidate	Votes	%
Democratic	Mary Welander	7,081	50.75
Republican	Dan DeBarba	6,309	45.22
Working Families	Mary Welander	283	2.03
Independent Party	Dan DeBarba	279	2.00
Total votes		13,952	100.00
Democratic gain from Republican			

=== District 115 ===
Democratic incumbent Dorinda Borer was re-elected to a 3rd term after running unopposed. Borer was also nominated by the Working Families Party. Borer has represented the 115th district since 2017.

2020 Connecticut State House of Representatives election, District 115
Party	Candidate	Votes	%
Democratic	Dorinda Keenan Borer (incumbent)	6,487	88.83
Working Families	Dorinda Keenan Borer (incumbent)	816	11.17
Total votes		7,303	100.00
Democratic hold			

=== District 116 ===
Democratic incumbent Michael DiMassa was re-elected to a 3rd term after running unopposed. DiMassa was also nominated by the Working Families Party. He has represented the 116th district since 2017.

2020 Connecticut State House of Representatives election, District 116
Party	Candidate	Votes	%
Democratic	Michael DiMassa (incumbent)	5,178	92.10
Working Families	Michael DiMassa (incumbent)	444	7.90
Total votes		5,622	100.00
Democratic hold			

=== District 117 ===
Republican incumbent Charles Ferraro was re-elected to a 4th term after defeating Democratic candidate Tony Sutton. Sutton was also nominated by the Independent Party and the Working Families Party. Ferraro has represented the 117th district since 2015.

2020 Connecticut State House of Representatives election, District 117
Party	Candidate	Votes	%
Republican	Charles Ferraro (incumbent)	7,353	53.91
Democratic	Tony Sutton	5,884	43.14
Independent Party	Tony Sutton	216	1.58
Working Families	Tony Sutton	187	1.37
Total votes		13,640	100.00
Republican hold			

=== District 118 ===
Democratic candidate Frank Smith was elected after defeating Republican candidate Erik Smith. Frank Smith was also nominated by the Working Families Party, while Erik Smith was nominated by the Independent Party. This seat was previously held by Democrat Kim Rose since 2011.

2020 Connecticut State House of Representatives election, District 118
Party	Candidate	Votes	%
Democratic	Frank Smith	6,908	52.83
Republican	Erik A. Smith	5,538	42.35
Independent Party	Erik A. Smith	338	2.58
Working Families	Frank Smith	292	2.23
Total votes		13,076	100.00
Democratic hold			

=== District 119 ===
Republican incumbent Kathy Kennedy was re-elected to a 2nd term after defeating Democratic candidate Bryan Anderson. Anderson was also nominated by the Independent Party and the Working Families Party.

2020 Connecticut State House of Representatives election, District 119
Party	Candidate	Votes	%
Republican	Kathy Kennedy (incumbent)	7,260	50.53
Democratic	Bryan Anderson	6,640	46.22
Independent Party	Bryan Anderson	302	2.10
Working Families	Bryan Anderson	165	1.15
Total votes		14,367	100.00
Republican hold			

=== District 120 ===
Democratic incumbent Philip Young was re-elected to a 3rd term after defeating Republican candidate Jim Feehan. Feehan was also nominated by the Independent Party. Young has represented the 120th district since 2018.

2020 Connecticut State House of Representatives election, District 120
Party	Candidate	Votes	%
Democratic	Philip L. Young (incumbent)	6,869	51.70
Republican	Jim Feehan	6,047	45.51
Independent Party	Jim Feehan	371	2.79
Total votes		13,287	100.00
Democratic hold			

=== District 121 ===
Democratic incumbent Joe Gresko was re-elected to a 4th term after defeating Republican candidate Edward Scinto. Gresko has represented the 121st district since 2016.

2020 Connecticut State House of Representatives election, District 121
Party	Candidate	Votes	%
Democratic	Joseph P. Gresko (incumbent)	7,303	69.30
Republican	Edward J. Scinto	3,235	30.70
Total votes		10,538	100.00
Democratic hold			

=== District 122 ===
Republican incumbent Ben McGorty was re-elected to a 5th term after defeating Democratic candidate Jose Goncalves. McGorty has represented the 122nd district since 2014.

2020 Connecticut State House of Representatives election, District 122
Party	Candidate	Votes	%
Republican	Ben McGorty (incumbent)	8,673	59.11
Democratic	Jose Goncalves	6,000	40.89
Total votes		14,673	100.00
Republican hold			

=== District 123 ===
Republican incumbent David Rutigliano was re-elected to a 5th term after defeating Democratic candidate Sujata Gadkar-Wilcox. Rutigliano was also nominated by the Independent Party, while Gadkar-Wilcox was nominated by the Working Families Party. Rutigliano has represented the 123rd district since 2013.

2020 Connecticut State House of Representatives election, District 123
Party	Candidate	Votes	%
Republican	David Rutigliano (incumbent)	6,816	48.65
Democratic	Sujata Gadkar-Wilcox	6,605	47.14
Independent Party	David Rutigliano (incumbent)	307	2.19
Working Families	Sujata Gadkar-Wilcox	283	2.02
Total votes		14,011	100.00
Republican hold			

=== District 124 ===
Democratic incumbent Andre Baker was re-elected to a 4th term after defeating Republican candidate Jasmin Sanchez and Independent Party candidate Wilfredo Martinez. Baker has represented the 124th district since 2015.

2020 Connecticut State House of Representatives election, District 124
Party	Candidate	Votes	%
Democratic	Andre Baker (incumbent)	5,337	82.78
Republican	Jasmin Sanchez	961	14.91
Independent Party	Wilfredo Martinez	149	2.31
Total votes		6,447	100.00
Democratic hold			

=== District 125 ===
Republican incumbent Tom O'Dea was re-elected to a 5th term after running unopposed. O'Dea has represented the 125th district since 2015.

2020 Connecticut State House of Representatives election, District 125
Party	Candidate	Votes	%
Republican	Tom O'Dea (incumbent)	9,762	100.00
Republican hold			

=== District 126 ===
Democratic incumbent Charlie Stallworth was re-elected to a 6th term after defeating Republican candidate Lee Grisby. Stallworth has represented the 126th district since 2011.

2020 Connecticut State House of Representatives election, District 126
Party	Candidate	Votes	%
Democratic	Charlie Stallworth (incumbent)	7,254	82.53
Republican	Lee V. Grisby II	1,535	17.47
Total votes		8,789	100.00
Democratic hold			

=== District 127 ===
Democratic incumbent John Hennessy was re-elected to a 9th term after defeating Republican candidate Peter Perillo and petitioning candidate Robert Keeley. Hennessy has represented the 127th district since 2005.

2020 Connecticut State House of Representatives election, District 127
Party	Candidate	Votes	%
Democratic	John F. Hennessy (incumbent)	5,523	73.32
Republican	Peter Perillo	1,848	24.53
Petitioning	Robert T. Keeley Jr.	162	2.15
Total votes		7,533	100.00
Democratic hold			

=== District 128 ===
Democratic incumbent Christopher Rosario was re-elected to a 4th term after defeating Republican candidate Ethan Book and petitioning candidate Wanda Simmons. Book was also nominated by the Independent Party. Rosario has represented the 128th district since 2015.

2020 Connecticut State House of Representatives election, District 128
Party	Candidate	Votes	%
Democratic	Christopher Rosario (incumbent)	3,359	79.79
Republican	Ethan Book Jr.	691	16.41
Independent Party	Ethan Book Jr.	101	2.40
Petitioning	Wanda R. Simmons	59	1.40
Total votes		4,210	100.00
Democratic hold			

=== District 129 ===
Democratic incumbent Steven Stafstrom was re-elected to a 4th term after defeating Republican candidate Helene Kouassi and petitioning candidate Robert Halstead. Stafstrom has represented the 129th district since 2015.

2020 Connecticut State House of Representatives election, District 129
Party	Candidate	Votes	%
Democratic	Steven Stafstrom (incumbent)	5,690	77.08
Republican	Helene S. Kouassi	1,502	20.35
Petitioning	Robert E. Halstead	190	2.57
Total votes		7,382	100.00
Democratic hold			

=== District 130 ===
Democratic incumbent Antonio Felipe was re-elected to a 2nd term after defeating Republican candidate Terrence Sullivan. Felipe has represented the 130th district since 2019.

2020 Connecticut State House of Representatives election, District 130
Party	Candidate	Votes	%
Democratic	Antonio Felipe (incumbent)	4,490	85.36
Republican	Terrence A. Sullivan	770	14.64
Total votes		5,260	100.00
Democratic hold			

=== District 131 ===
Republican incumbent David Labriola was re-elected to a 10th term after running unopposed. Labriola has represented the 131st district since 2003.

2020 Connecticut State House of Representatives election, District 131
Party	Candidate	Votes	%
Republican	David Labriola (incumbent)	10,295	100.00
Republican hold			

=== District 132 ===
Democratic candidate Jennifer Leeper was elected after defeating Republican incumbent Brian Farnen. Leeper was also nominated by the Working Families Party, while Farnen was nominated by the Independent Party. Farnen had represented the 132nd district since 2020.

2020 Connecticut State House of Representatives election, District 132
Party	Candidate	Votes	%
Democratic	Jennifer Leeper	7,388	49.32
Republican	Brian Farnen (incumbent)	6,885	45.96
Independent Party	Brian Farnen (incumbent)	459	3.06
Working Families	Jennifer Leeper	249	1.66
Total votes		14,981	100.00
Democratic gain from Republican			

=== District 133 ===
Democratic incumbent Cristin McCarthy Vahey was re-elected to a 4th term after defeating Republican candidate Joanne Romano-Csonka. Vahey was also nominated by the Working Families Party, while Romano-Csonka was nominated by the Independent Party. Vahey has represented the 133rd district since 2015.

2020 Connecticut State House of Representatives election, District 133
Party	Candidate	Votes	%
Democratic	Cristin McCarthy Vahey (incumbent)	7,581	62.65
Republican	Joanne Romano-Csonka	4,056	33.52
Working Families	Cristin McCarthy Vahey (incumbent)	287	2.37
Independent Party	Joanne Romano-Csonka	177	1.46
Total votes		12,101	100.00
Democratic hold			

=== District 134 ===
Republican incumbent Laura Devlin was re-elected to a 4th term after defeating Democratic candidate Carla Volpe. Volpe was also nominated by the Independent Party and the Working Families Party. Devlin has represented the 134th district since 2015.

2020 Connecticut State House of Representatives election, District 134
Party	Candidate	Votes	%
Republican	Laura Devlin (incumbent)	7,344	52.04
Democratic	Carla Volpe	6,413	45.44
Independent Party	Carla Volpe	226	1.60
Working Families	Carla Volpe	130	0.92
Total votes		14,113	100.00
Republican hold			

=== District 135 ===
Democratic incumbent Anne Meiman Hughes was re-elected to a 2nd term after defeating Republican candidate John Shaban. Shaban was also nominated by the Independent Party. Hughes has represented the 135th district since 2019.

2020 Connecticut State House of Representatives election, District 124
Party	Candidate	Votes	%
Democratic	Anne Meiman Hughes (incumbent)	8,662	56.88
Republican	John Shaban	6,215	40.81
Independent Party	John Shaban	352	2.31
Total votes		15,229	100.00
Democratic hold			

=== District 136 ===
Democratic incumbent Jonathan Steinberg was re-elected to a 6th term after defeating Republican candidate Chip Stephens. Steinberg has represented the 136th district since 2011.

2020 Connecticut State House of Representatives election, District 136
Party	Candidate	Votes	%
Democratic	Jonathan Steinberg (incumbent)	10,567	66.51
Republican	Chip Stephens	5,322	33.49
Total votes		15,889	100.00
Democratic hold			

=== District 137 ===
Democratic incumbent Chris Perone was re-elected to a 9th term after defeating Republican candidate Ellen Wink. Wink was also nominated by the Independent Party. Perone has represented the 137th district since 2005.

2020 Connecticut State House of Representatives election, District 137
Party	Candidate	Votes	%
Democratic	Chris Perone (incumbent)	7,813	66.61
Republican	Ellen G. Wink	3,619	30.85
Independent Party	Ellen G. Wink	298	2.54
Total votes		11,730	100.00
Democratic hold			

=== District 138 ===
Democratic incumbent Kenneth Gucker was re-elected to a 2nd term after defeating Republican candidate Emile Buzaid. Gucker was also nominated by the Working Families Party, while Buzaid was nominated by the Independent Party. Gucker has represented the 138th district since 2019.

2020 Connecticut State House of Representatives election, District 138
Party	Candidate	Votes	%
Democratic	Kenneth Gucker (incumbent)	6,530	51.48
Republican	Emile Buzaid	5,582	44.00
Working Families	Kenneth Gucker (incumbent)	302	2.38
Independent Party	Emile Buzaid	271	2.14
Total votes		12,685	100.00
Democratic hold			

=== District 139 ===
Democratic incumbent Kevin Ryan was re-elected to a 15th term after defeating Republican candidate Caleb Espinosa. Ryan was also nominated by the Working Families Party, while Espinosa was nominated by the Independent Party. Ryan has represented the 139th district since 1993.

2020 Connecticut State House of Representatives election, District 139
Party	Candidate	Votes	%
Democratic	Kevin Ryan (incumbent)	5,417	51.54
Republican	Caleb Espinosa	4,469	42.52
Working Families	Kevin Ryan (incumbent)	326	3.10
Independent Party	Caleb Espinosa	299	2.84
Total votes		10,511	100.00
Democratic hold			

=== District 140 ===
Democratic incumbent Travis Simms was re-elected to a 2nd term after defeating Republican candidate John Flynn. Simms has represented the 140th district since 2019.

2020 Connecticut State House of Representatives election, District 140
Party	Candidate	Votes	%
Democratic	Travis Simms (incumbent)	5,861	78.11
Republican	John J. Flynn	1,643	21.89
Total votes		7,504	100.00
Democratic hold			

=== District 141 ===
Republican incumbent Terrie Wood was re-elected to a 7th term after running unopposed. Wood was also nominated by the Independent Party. She has represented the 141st district since 2009.

2020 Connecticut State House of Representatives election, District 141
Party	Candidate	Votes	%
Republican	Terrie Wood (incumbent)	8,793	80.19
Independent Party	Terrie Wood (incumbent)	2,172	19.81
Total votes		10,965	100.00
Republican hold			

=== District 142 ===
Democratic incumbent Lucy Dathan was re-elected to a 2nd term after defeating Republican candidate Fred Wilms. Dathan was also nominated by the Working Families Party, while Wilms was nominated by the Independent Party. Dathan has represented the 142nd district since 2019.

2020 Connecticut State House of Representatives election, District 142
Party	Candidate	Votes	%
Democratic	Lucy Dathan (incumbent)	7,647	53.60
Republican	Fred Wilms	5,974	41.87
Independent Party	Fred Wilms	378	2.65
Working Families	Lucy Dathan (incumbent)	269	1.89
Total votes		14,268	100.00
Democratic hold			

=== District 143 ===
Democratic candidate Stephanie Thomas was elected after defeating Republican candidate Patricia Zucaro. Thomas was also nominated by the Working Families Party, while Zucaro was nominated by the Independent Party. This seat was previously held by Republican Gail Lavielle since 2011.

2020 Connecticut State House of Representatives election, District 143
Party	Candidate	Votes	%
Democratic	Stephanie Thomas	8,105	53.70
Republican	Patrizia Zucaro	6,409	42.47
Independent Party	Patrizia Zucaro	321	2.13
Working Families	Stephanie Thomas	257	1.70
Total votes		15,092	100.00
Democratic gain from Republican			

=== District 144 ===
Democratic incumbent Caroline Simmons was re-elected to a 4th term after running unopposed. Simmons has represented the 144th district since 2015.

2020 Connecticut State House of Representatives election, District 144
Party	Candidate	Votes	%
Democratic	Caroline Simmons (incumbent)	9,106	100.00
Democratic hold			

=== District 145 ===
Democratic incumbent Patricia Billie Miller was re-elected to a 7th term after defeating Republican candidate J.D. Ospina. Miller has represented the 145th district since 2009.

2020 Connecticut State House of Representatives election, District 145
Party	Candidate	Votes	%
Democratic	Patricia Billie Miller (incumbent)	5,898	77.26
Republican	J.D. Ospina	1,736	22.74
Total votes		7,634	100.00
Democratic hold			

=== District 146 ===
Democratic incumbent David Michel was re-elected to a 2nd term after defeating Republican candidate George Hallenbeck. Michel has represented the 146th district since 2019.

2020 Connecticut State House of Representatives election, District 146
Party	Candidate	Votes	%
Democratic	David Michel (incumbent)	8,147	70.49
Republican	George Hallenbeck	3,410	29.51
Total votes		11,557	100.00
Democratic hold			

=== District 147 ===
Democratic incumbent Matt Blumenthal was re-elected to a 2nd term after defeating Republican candidate Dan Maymin. Blumenthal has represented the 147th district since 2019.

2020 Connecticut State House of Representatives election, District 147
Party	Candidate	Votes	%
Democratic	Matt Blumenthal (incumbent)	8,451	62.02
Republican	Dan Maymin	5,176	37.98
Total votes		13,627	100.00
Democratic hold			

=== District 148 ===
Democratic incumbent Daniel Fox was re-elected to a 6th term after defeating Republican candidate Wilm Donath. Fox has represented the 148th district since 2011.

2020 Connecticut State House of Representatives election, District 147
Party	Candidate	Votes	%
Democratic	Daniel J. Fox (incumbent)	6,519	76.03
Republican	Wilm Donath	2,055	23.97
Total votes		8,574	100.00
Democratic hold			

=== District 149 ===
Republican candidate Kimberly Fiorello was elected after defeating Democratic candidate Kathleen Stowe. Fiorello was also nominated by the Independent Party. This seat was previously held by Republican Livvy Floren since 2001.

2020 Connecticut's 149th House of Representatives district election
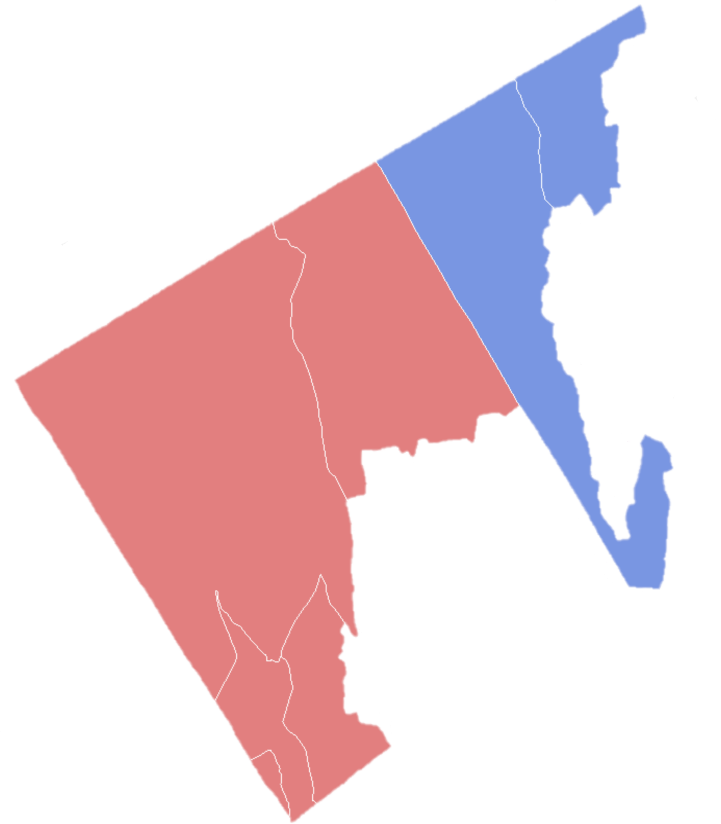
- Precinct results Fiorello 50-60% Stowe 50-60%

2020 Connecticut State House of Representatives election, District 149
Party	Candidate	Votes	%
Republican	Kimberly Fiorello	6,878	49.09
Democratic	Kathleen Stowe	6,809	48.59
Independent Party	Kimberly Fiorello	325	2.32
Total votes		14,012	100.00
Republican hold			

=== District 150 ===
Democratic incumbent Steve Meskers was re-elected to a 2nd term after defeating Republican candidate Joe Kelly. Kelly was also nominated by the Independent Party. Meskers has represented the 150th district since 2019.

2020 Connecticut State House of Representatives election, District 150
Party	Candidate	Votes	%
Democratic	Steve Meskers (incumbent)	6,714	54.92
Republican	Joe Kelly	5,225	42.74
Independent Party	Joe Kelly	287	2.35
Total votes		12,226	100.00
Democratic hold			

=== District 151 ===
Republican incumbent Harry Arora was re-elected to a 2nd term after defeating Democratic candidate Hector Arzeno. Arora has represented the 151st district since 2020.

2020 Connecticut State House of Representatives election, District 151
Party	Candidate	Votes	%
Republican	Harry Arora (incumbent)	7,332	53.10
Democratic	Hector Arzeno	6,477	46.90
Total votes		13,809	100.00
Republican hold			

== See also ==
- 2020 Connecticut elections
  - 2020 Connecticut Senate election
