= Osiecki =

Osiecki (feminine: Osiecka; plural: Osieccy) is a Polish surname derived from the village Osieck, Mazovia, Poland. Notable people include:

- Agnieszka Osiecka (1936–1997), Polish writer
- Clarice Osiecki (1934–2007), American politician
- Mark Osiecki (born 1968), American ice hockey player and coach
- Piotr Osiecki (born 1961), Polish politician
- Sandy Osiecki (born 1960), American football player
- Stanisław Osiecki (1875–1967), Polish politician
- Stefan Osiecki (1902–1977), Polish painter

== See also ==
- Ossietzky
