= William H. Nickerson =

American politician (born 1939)

William Nickerson
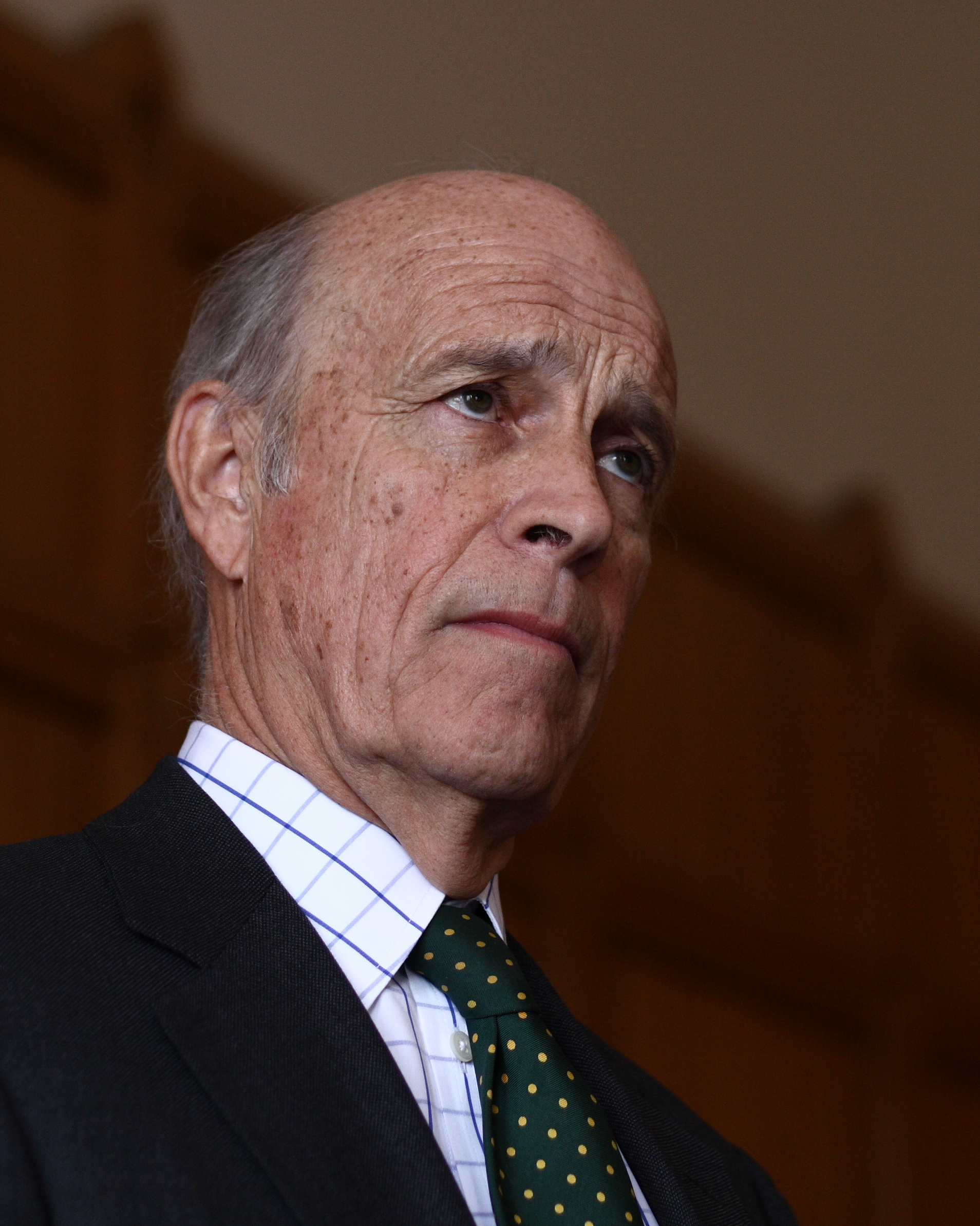
- Nickerson in 2008

Member of the Connecticut State Senate from the 36th district
- In office January 9, 1991 – January 7, 2009
- Preceded by: Emil Benvenuto
- Succeeded by: Scott Frantz

Member of the Connecticut House of Representatives from the 149th district
- In office January 7, 1987 – January 9, 1991
- Preceded by: Michael D. Flinn
- Succeeded by: Janet K. Lockton

Personal details
- Born: January 22, 1939 (age 87) Glen Cove, New York, U.S.
- Party: Republican
- Spouse: Jane McPherson (m. 1962)
- Children: 2
- Relatives: Eugene Nickerson (step-brother)
- Education: Harvard University (BA); Columbia University (LLB)

William Hoffman Nickerson (born January 22, 1939) is an American politician from Connecticut. A member of the Republican Party, he was in the Connecticut House of Representatives from 1987 to 1991 and the Connecticut State Senate from 1991 to 2009.

== Early life and education ==
Nickerson was born on January 22, 1939 in Glen Cove, New York to Hoffman and Jane (née Soames) Nickerson. His father, the grandson of noted clergyman Eugene Augustus Hoffman, was a Harvard graduate, served as an army officer in both world wars, was a Republican member of the New York State Assembly from the 27th district in 1916 representing the Upper East Side, and was an author. Hoffman Nickerson was also previously married to Ruth Comstock from 1916 up until their divorce in 1937. The marriage produced two children, one of which was Eugene Nickerson, a Democratic politician from New York.

Nickerson received his BA from Harvard College in 1961. He then received his LLB from Columbia Law School in 1964. While studying at Columbia Law, he married Jane McPherson on September 8, 1962.

== Career ==
From 1969 until 1986, Nickerson served as the Greenwich Town Meeting Representative. In 1978, he ran for the 149th state house district. Although he won the Republican town committee endorsement 12-10, he lost to Everett Smith Jr. 977-919 in the primary. In 1986, Nickerson ran for the district again and won. He initially sought the Republican nomination for Connecticut's 4th congressional district in 1987, but dropped out on June 27 due to lack of support among Greenwich delegates. He served in the State House until 1990 when he was elected to the State Senate, defeating incumbent Senator Emil Benvenuto (ACP) and Greenwich Selectman Ned Lamont (D). He declined to seek another term to the State Senate in 2008.

Nickerson previously practiced law and was a member of the bars in Connecticut and New York.

In 2016, Nickerson endorsed John Kasich for President of the United States.

== Personal ==
Nickerson is from Greenwich, Connecticut. He has two adult children with his wife Jane.

Connecticut House of Representatives
Preceded by Michael D. Flinn	Member of the Connecticut House of Representatives from the 149th district 1987–1991	Succeeded by Janet K. Lockton
Connecticut State Senate
Preceded by Emil Benvenuto	Member of the Connecticut State Senate from the 36th district 1991–2009	Succeeded by Scott Frantz
