= Jesse MacLachlan =

American politician

Member of the Connecticut House of Representatives from the 35th district
- In office January 7, 2015 – January 6, 2021
- Preceded by: Tom Vicino
- Succeeded by: Christine Goupil

Personal details
- Born: March 26, 1990 (age 36) New Haven, Connecticut, U.S.
- Party: Republican

Jesse MacLachlan (born March 26, 1990) is an American politician who served in the Connecticut House of Representatives from the 35th district from 2015 to 2021.
