= Pasquale DeBaise =

American businessman and politician (1926–2022)

Member of the Connecticut House of Representatives from the 82nd district
- In office 1967–1973
- Preceded by: Seat created
- Succeeded by: Walter A. Evilia

Personal details
- Born: August 13, 1926 Wallingford, Connecticut, U.S.
- Died: February 17, 2022 (aged 95) Wallingford, Connecticut, U.S.
- Party: Democratic

Pasquale J. DeBaise (August 13, 1926 – February 17, 2022) was an American businessman and politician.

DeBaise was born in Wallingford, Connecticut. He served in the United States Navy during World War II. DeBaise owned a heating and air conditioning business in Wallingford. He served in the Connecticut House of Representatives from 1967 to 1973 and was a Democrat. He died in Wallingford, Connecticut, on February 17, 2022, at the age of 95.
