= Connecticut's 149th House of Representatives district =

American legislative district

Connecticut's 149th State House of Representatives district
Representative
Tina Courpas; R

Connecticut's 149th House of Representatives district elects one member of the Connecticut House of Representatives. It encompasses parts of Greenwich and Stamford and has been represented by Republican Tina Courpas since 2025.

A heavily ancestrally Republican district, it has shifted Democratic in recent years, partly due to backlash among suburban and higher-income voters against Donald Trump.

== List of representatives ==
In 1964, Connecticut was redistricted, abolishing its system of electing no more than two representatives per town. It added a 149th House district. However, as house elections were cancelled in 1964 to redistrict, members would be elected in 1966.

Representative	Party	Years	District home	Note
Bernard Breeman	Republican	1967 – 1969	East Norwalk	
William J. Lyons Jr.	Republican	1969 – 1973	Norwalk	
Abijah Upson Fox	Republican	1973 – 1979	Greenwich	Redistricted from the 152nd District
Everett Smith Jr.	Republican	1979 – 1983	Greenwich	
Michael D. Flinn	Republican	1983 – 1987	Greenwich	
William H. Nickerson	Republican	1987 – 1991	Greenwich	Later served as a Connecticut State Senator
Janet K. Lockton	Republican	1991 – 2001	Greenwich	
Livvy Floren	Republican	2001 – 2021	Greenwich	
Kimberly Fiorello	Republican	2021 – 2023	Greenwich	
Rachel Khanna	Democratic	2023 – 2025	Greenwich	
Tina Courpas	Republican	2025 – present	Greenwich	

== Election results ==
=== 2024 ===
Connecticut's 149th House of Representatives district election, 2024
Party	Candidate	Votes	%
Republican	Tina Courpas	7,124	51.80%
Total	Rachel Khanna (incumbent)	6,628	48.2%
Democratic	Rachel Khanna (incumbent)	6,469	47.04%
Independent Party	Rachel Khanna (incumbent)	159	1.16%
Total votes		13,572	100.0%

=== 2022 ===
Connecticut's 149th State house district election, 2022
Party	Candidate	Votes	%
Democratic	Rachel Khanna	5,243	49.97%
Republican	Kimberly Fiorello (incumbent)	5,141	49.00%
Independent Party	Rachel Khanna	108	1.03%
Total votes		10,492	100.00%
Democratic gain from Republican			

=== 2020 ===
Connecticut's 149th State house district election, 2020
Party	Candidate	Votes	%
Republican	Kimberly Fiorello	6,878	49.09%
Democratic	Kathleen Stowe	6,809	48.59%
Independent Party	Kimberly Fiorello	325	2.32%
Total votes		14,012	100.00
Republican hold			

=== 2018 ===
Connecticut's 149th State house district election, 2018
Party	Candidate	Votes	%
Republican	Livvy Floren (incumbent)	6,971	100.00%
Republican hold			

=== 2016 ===
Connecticut's 149th State house district election, 2016
Party	Candidate	Votes	%
Republican	Livvy Floren (incumbent)	8,949	100.00%
Republican hold			

=== 2014 ===
Connecticut's 149th State house district election, 2014
Party	Candidate	Votes	%
Republican	Livvy Floren (incumbent)	5,554	100.00%
Republican hold			

=== 2012 ===
Connecticut's 149th State house district election, 2012
Party	Candidate	Votes	%
Republican	Livvy Floren (incumbent)	7,139	64.15%
Democratic	John Blankley	3,991	35.85%
Total votes		11,130	100.00%
Republican hold			

=== 2010 ===
Connecticut's 149th State house district election, 2010
Party	Candidate	Votes	%
Republican	Livvy Floren (incumbent)	5,583	67.37%
Democratic	Howard Richman	2,704	32.63%
Total votes		8,287	100.00%
Republican hold			

=== 2008 ===
Connecticut's 149th State house district election, 2008
Party	Candidate	Votes	%
Republican	Livvy Floren (incumbent)	7,232	100.00%
Total votes		7,232	100.00%
Republican hold			

=== 2006 ===
Connecticut's 149th State house district election, 2006
Party	Candidate	Votes	%
Republican	Livvy Floren (incumbent)	4,944	100.00%
Total votes		4,944	100.00%
Republican hold			

=== 2004 ===
Connecticut's 149th State house district election, 2004
Party	Candidate	Votes	%
Republican	Livvy Floren (incumbent)	6,194	61.35%
Democratic	Kym Kynes	3,903	38.65%
Total votes		10,097	100.00%
Republican hold			

=== 2002 ===
Connecticut's 149th State house district election, 2002
Party	Candidate	Votes	%
Republican	Livvy Floren (incumbent)	4,631	100.00%
Total votes		4,631	100.00%
Republican hold			

=== 2000 ===
Connecticut's 149th State house district election, 2000
Party	Candidate	Votes	%
Republican	Livvy Floren	6,652	100.00%
Total votes		6,652	100.00%
Republican hold			

=== 1998 ===
Connecticut's 149th State house district election, 1998
Party	Candidate	Votes	%
Republican	Janet Lockton (incumbent)	4,800	100.00%
Total votes		4,800	100.00%
Republican hold			

=== 1996 ===
Connecticut's 149th State house district election, 1996
Party	Candidate	Votes	%
Republican	Janet Lockton (incumbent)	5,953	57.70%
Democratic	Stephanie H. Sanchez	4,365	42.30%
Total votes		10,318	100.00%
Republican hold			

=== 1994 ===
Connecticut's 149th State house district election, 1994
Party	Candidate	Votes	%
Republican	Janet Lockton (incumbent)	4,502	61.44%
Democratic	John C. Loeser	2,826	38.56%
Total votes		7,328	100.00%
Republican hold			

=== 1992 ===
Connecticut's 149th State house district election, 1992
Party	Candidate	Votes	%
Republican	Janet Lockton (incumbent)	6,671	61.85%
Democratic	John C. Loeser	4,116	38.15%
Total votes		10,787	100.00%
Republican hold			

=== 1990 ===
Connecticut's 149th State house district election, 1990
Party	Candidate	Votes	%
Republican	Janet Lockton	4,107	64.55%
Democratic	Alama Rutgers	2,256	35.45%
Total votes		6,363	100.00%
Republican hold			

Results by district
District	Lockton Republican		Rutgers Democratic		Total
District	Votes	%	Votes	%	Votes
Greenwich	4,107	64.55%	2,256	35.45%	6,363
3	178	36.85%	305	63.15%	483
4A	224	49.23%	231	50.77%	455
7	1,029	71.56%	409	28.44%	1,438
9	832	50.76%	807	49.24%	1,639
10	1,308	77.72%	375	22.28%	1,683
11A	536	80.60%	129	19.40%	665
Totals	4,107	64.55%	2,256	35.45%	6,363

=== 1988 ===
Connecticut's 149th State house district election, 1988
Party	Candidate	Votes	%
Republican	William H. Nickerson (incumbent)	6,388	71.01%
Democratic	Mary Ann Ramos	2,607	28.99%
Total votes		8,995	100.00%
Republican hold			

Results by district
District	Nickerson Republican		Ramos Democratic		Total
District	Votes	%	Votes	%	Votes
Greenwich	6,388	71.01%	2,607	28.99%	8,995
3	393	54.06%	334	45.94%	727
4A	394	63.55%	226	36.45%	620
7	1,510	77.04%	450	22.96%	1,960
9	1,437	60.45%	940	39.55%	2,377
10	1,897	80.72%	453	19.28%	2,350
11A	757	78.77%	204	21.23%	961
Totals	6,388	71.01%	2,607	28.99%	8,995

=== 1986 ===
Connecticut's 149th State house district election, 1986
Party	Candidate	Votes	%
Republican	William H. Nickerson	4,069	69.45%
Democratic	Leonard J. LaLuna	1,790	30.55%
Total votes		5,859	100.00%
Republican hold			

=== 1984 ===
Connecticut's 149th State house district election, 1984
Party	Candidate	Votes	%
Republican	Michael D. Flinn (incumbent)	8,059	73.09%
Democratic	Alma Rutgers	2,966	26.91%
Total votes		11,025	100.00%
Republican hold			

=== 1982 ===
Connecticut's 149th State house district election, 1982
Party	Candidate	Votes	%
Republican	Michael D. Flinn	4,824	69.34%
Democratic	William Richter	2,133	30.66%
Total votes		6,957	100.00%
Republican hold			

=== 1980 ===
Connecticut's 149th State house district election, 1980
Party	Candidate	Votes	%
Republican	Everett Smith Jr. (incumbent)	7,460	71.79%
Democratic	Lawrence A. Infante	2,932	28.21%
Total votes		10,392	100.00%
Republican hold			

=== 1978 ===
Connecticut's 149th State house district election, 1978
Party	Candidate	Votes	%
Republican	Everett Smith Jr.	4,406	59.57%
Democratic	Carol Lutz	2,990	40.43%
Total votes		7,396	100.00%
Republican hold			

=== 1976 ===
Connecticut's 149th State house district election, 1976
Party	Candidate	Votes	%
Republican	Abijah Upson Fox (incumbent)	6,419	61.57%
Democratic	Mary L. Woods	4,007	38.43%
Total votes		10,426	100.00%
Republican hold			

=== 1974 ===
Connecticut's 149th State house district election, 1974
Party	Candidate	Votes	%
Republican	Abijah Upson Fox (incumbent)	3,896	55.37%
Democratic	Mary L. Woods	3,140	44.63%
Total votes		7,036	100.00%
Republican hold			

=== 1972 ===
Connecticut's 149th State house district election, 1972
Party	Candidate	Votes	%
Republican	Abijah Upson Fox	6,612	65.40%
Democratic	Mary L. Woods	3,498	34.60%
Total votes		10,110	100.00%
Republican hold			

=== 1970 ===
Connecticut's 149th State house district election, 1970
Party	Candidate	Votes	%
Republican	William J. Lyons Jr. (incumbent)	2,830	59.68%
Democratic	Ralph A. Fabrizio Sr.	1,819	38.36%
American	Richard A. Bucciciarelli	93	1.96%
Total votes		4,742	100.00%
Republican hold			

=== 1968 ===
Connecticut's 149th State house district election, 1968
Party	Candidate	Votes	%
Republican	William J. Lyons Jr.	3,366	59.05%
Democratic	Frank W. Murphy	2,334	40.95%
Total votes		5,700	100.00%
Republican hold			

=== 1966 ===
Connecticut's 149th State house district election, 1966
Party	Candidate	Votes	%
Republican	Bernard Breeman	2,526	55.70%
Democratic	Caroll Cavanaugh	2,009	44.30%
Total votes		4,535	100.00%
Republican win (new seat)			
