= Norma Gyle =

American politician (born 1942)

Member of the Connecticut House of Representatives from the 108th district
- In office 1985–1999
- Preceded by: Lawrence M. Riefberg
- Succeeded by: Mary Ann Carson

Personal details
- Born: May 15, 1942 (age 84) East Orange, New Jersey, U.S.
- Party: Republican
- Education: Bristol Community College (RN); Western Connecticut State University (B.A., M.S.)

Norma Gyle (born May 15, 1942) is an American politician who served in the Connecticut House of Representatives from 1985 to 1999, representing the 108th district as a Republican.

== Career ==
Gyle was born in East Orange, New Jersey, in 1942. She attended Bristol Community College and Western Connecticut State University, and she has worked as a registered nurse.

Gyle was first elected to the Connecticut House of Representatives in 1984, and she represented the 108th district for six full terms before stepping down during her seventh. Gyle had also served as the deputy commissioner of the Connecticut Department of Public Health, and in 1999, following Commissioner Stephen Harriman's resignation, Gyle became acting commissioner and left the House of Representatives. A special election was triggered, and Gyle was succeeded by Mary Ann Carson.
