= Tina Courpas =

American politician (born 1966)

Member of the Connecticut House of Representatives from the 149th district
- Incumbent
- Assumed office January 8, 2025
- Preceded by: Rachel Khanna

Personal details
- Born: Katherine Ann Courpas; July 4, 1966 (age 60) Baltimore, Maryland, U.S.
- Party: Republican
- Spouse: Kamil Marc Salame (m. 1999, divorced)
- Education: Princeton University (AB); Columbia University (JD)

Katherine Ann "Tina" Courpas ([kuʁpɑ], approximately koor-PAH; born July 4, 1966) is an American attorney and politician who currently serves as a member of the Connecticut House of Representatives for the 149th district, encompassing parts of Greenwich and Stamford, for the Republican Party. On November 6, 2024, Courpas defeated Democratic incumbent Rachel Khanna, also of Greenwich.

== Early life and education ==
Courpas was born July 4, 1966 in Baltimore, Maryland to Anthony Stamatios Courpas and Corinne Z. Courpas (née Zoides), Greek physicians who immigrated to the U.S. in 1959. She has an older sister.

She graduated magna cum laude from Princeton University in 1988. Courpas received a Juris Doctor degree from Columbia University in 1994, where she was a Harlan Fiske Stone Scholar.

== Career ==
Before entering politics, Courpas worked on Wall Street for over 20 years. She began her career at Goldman, Sachs & Co. She later practiced law at Kirkland & Ellis before returning to investment banking where she raised capital for private equity funds, including at Credit Suisse Private Fund Group. From Wall Street, Courpas went on to become the executive director of two non-profits.

In 2018, Courpas became the executive director of the Permanent Commission on the Status of Women in Connecticut, a bipartisan political non-profit. During her time as executive director, she helped advocate for legislation protecting Connecticut girls and women. In 2022, Courpas was chosen to be the executive director of The Hellenic Initiative, an apolitical, philanthropic organization which unites the global Greek Diaspora in support of Greece.

== Politics ==
In February 2024, Courpas filed for candidacy. Courpas was unanimously nominated by Republican delegates from Greenwich and Stamford on May 16, 2024, as the Republican candidate for the 149th District. In November 2024, Courpas defeated one term Democratic incumbent Rachel Khanna.

== Personal life ==
On September 25, 1999, Courpas married Kamil Marc Salame, then a vice president at Donaldson, Lufkin & Jenrette, of Danbury, Connecticut, whom she later divorced. They have four children.

Courpas resides in Greenwich, Connecticut.
