= Michael D. Flinn =

American politician (1941–2015)

Member of the Connecticut House of Representatives from the 149th district
- In office 1982–1986
- Preceded by: Everett Smith Jr.
- Succeeded by: William H. Nickerson

Personal details
- Born: Michael de Vlaming Flinn; June 15, 1941 Durham, North Carolina, U.S.
- Died: August 1, 2015 (aged 74) Greenwich, Connecticut, U.S.
- Party: Republican
- Education: Yale College; Harvard Law School

Michael D. Flinn (1941–2015) was an American politician who served in the Connecticut House of Representatives from the 149th district from 1982 to 1986.
