= Mary Ann Carson =

American politician

Member of the Connecticut House of Representatives from the 108th district
- In office 1999–2011
- Preceded by: Norma Gyle
- Succeeded by: Richard A. Smith

Personal details
- Party: Republican

Mary Ann Carson is an American politician who served in the Connecticut House of Representatives from 1999 to 2011, representing the 108th district.

Carson and her husband Douglas have two daughters, Denise Cocozza and Natalie Venskus. She has three grandchildren, Trevor Cocozza, Kevin Cocozza and Luke Venskus. She resides in New Fairfield, Connecticut, United States.

== Career ==
Carson was first elected to the House of Representatives in a special election in 1999. She was re-elected in 2000, 2002, 2004, 2006 and 2008. Carson is a Republican.
