= Patrick Callahan =

American politician from Connecticut

Member of the Connecticut House of Representatives from the 108th district
- Incumbent
- Assumed office January 6, 2021
- Preceded by: Richard A. Smith

Personal details
- Party: Republican
- Education: Western Connecticut State University (BA)

Patrick Callahan is an American Republican Party politician currently serving as a member of the Connecticut House of Representatives from the 108th district, which encompasses the town of Sherman as well as parts of New Fairfield, New Milford, and Danbury, since 2021. Callahan was first elected to the house in 2020 over Democrat Danette Onofrio. He was re-elected in 2022 over Democrat Jeff Ginsburg. Callahan currently serves as a member of the House Judiciary, Education, and Environment Committees.
