= Janet Lockton =

American politician (born 1942)

Janet K. Lockton

Member of the Connecticut House of Representatives from the 149th district
- In office January 9, 1991 – January 3, 2001
- Preceded by: William H. Nickerson
- Succeeded by: Livvy Floren

Personal details
- Born: Janet Kimmerle; February 24, 1942 (age 84) Millburn, New Jersey, U.S.
- Party: Republican
- Spouse: Stephen Hamrick Lockton (m. 1964)
- Children: 3
- Education: Bennett College (AB)

Janet K. Lockton (née Kimmerle; born February 24, 1942) is an American politician. She served as a member of the Connecticut House of Representatives from the 149th District for the Republican Party between 1990 and 2000, where she also served on the Legislators Nomination Council. She was succeeded by Livvy Floren in 2001.

== Early life and education ==
Lockton was born February 24, 1942, in New Jersey to Herbert (b. 1913) and Vivian Kimmerle. She was primarily raised in Millburn, New Jersey in Essex County. She has three siblings. Her paternal grandfather was born in the German Empire. She attended Bennett College in Millbrook, New York.

== Politics ==
Lockton served as a Republican member of the Connecticut House of Representatives from 1990 to 2000 for the 149th District. She was succeeded by her fellow ally and former campaign manager Livvy Floren.

== Personal life ==
In 1964, she married Stephen Hamrick Lockton (b. 1939), with whom she has three children: Curt, Tyler and Elise.
