= Chris Aniskovich =

American politician

Member of the Connecticut House of Representatives from the 35th district
- Incumbent
- Assumed office January 4, 2023
- Preceded by: Christine Goupil
- Succeeded by: Cinzia Lettieri (elect)

Chair of the Clinton Town Council
- In office November 2019 – November 2023

Member of the Clinton Town Council
- Incumbent
- Assumed office November 2019

Personal details
- Born: March 14, 1965 (age 61)
- Party: Republican
- Education: Merrimack College (BS)
- Website: www.cthousegop.com/aniskovich/

Chris Aniskovich (born March 14, 1965) is an American politician who serves in the Connecticut House of Representatives representing the 35th district. The district is composed of Chris' hometown of Clinton, as well as neighboring Killingworth and the northern half of Westbrook. Chris has also been a member of the Clinton Town Council since its creation in 2019, and was the chair from 2019 to 2023. Beginning in 2025, Chris has served as the Ranking Member of the Commerce Committee in the Connecticut General Assembly.

== Political career ==
=== 2019 Clinton Town Council Election ===
Chris Aniskovich was elected to a four-year term on the Clinton Town Council on November 5, 2019, receiving 1,473 votes (11.24%), the highest vote-getter in the group of 11 total candidates. He then was voted as Chairman of the council and reelected as chair after the 2021 elections. He also previously served on the Planning & Zoning Commission and Board of Assessment Appeals in Clinton.

=== 2022 State Representative Campaign ===
Aniskovich focused on local issues that affected his community during his campaign. Aniskovich states that he is an advocate for low taxes, responsible spending, and increased community investment to tackle rising inflation. Aniskovich is also an advocate for coastal resiliency funding due to the district's proximity to Long Island Sound. He also is a supporter of localized control of zoning and school boards, in which he views that the local communities make the best decisions for themselves when it comes to local issues. Chris also is a supporter of increased funding for local police forces, noting that they need sufficient funding so that they can continue to do their jobs effectively. Chris was elected in the general election on November 8, 2022, winning 50.96% of the vote over a combined 49.03% of Democratic/Independent candidate Christine Goupil and Green candidate Hugh Birdsall. Chris began his first term on January 4, 2023. At the beginning of the 2023 session, Aniskovich announced that he would be on the Banking, Commerce, and General Law Committees in the Connecticut House of Representatives.

=== 2023 Clinton Town Council Election ===
Chris Aniskovich was re-elected to a four-year term on the Clinton Town Council on November 7, 2023, receiving 1,942 votes (21.8%), the highest vote-getter in the group of 5 total candidates. However, Democrats gained control of the council in the 2023 Municipal Elections, making Chris lose the chair position.

=== 2024 State Representative Campaign ===
Chris Aniskovich was re-elected to a second term as State Representative on November 5, 2024, with the endorsement of the Independent Party of Connecticut getting 50.5% of the vote. His Democratic opponent was political newcomer Cinzia Letteri who was endorsed by the Working Families Party garnering 49.5% of the vote. Aniskovich ran his campaign on an affordability platform, while also highlighting funding to the district that he brought back and the need for sufficient mental health resources in local communities. At the beginning of the 2025 session, Aniskovich announced that he would be on the Banking, Commerce, and General Law Committees in the Connecticut House of Representatives and serve as the Ranking Member on the Commerce committee this session.

== Electoral history ==
2022 Connecticut State House of Representatives election, 35th District
Party	Candidate	Votes	%
Republican	Chris Aniskovich	5,841	50.96%
Democratic	Christine Goupil (incumbent)	5,374	46.89%
Independent Party	Christine Goupil (incumbent)	162	1.41%
Green	Hugh Birdsall	84	0.73%
Total votes		11,461	100.00%
Republican gain from Democratic			

2024 Connecticut State House of Representatives election, 35th District
Party	Candidate	Votes	%
Republican	Chris Aniskovich (incumbent)	7,019	48.90%
Independent Party	Chris Aniskovich (incumbent)	233	1.62%
Democratic	Cinzia Letteri	6,848	47.71%
Working Families	Cinzia Letteri	254	1.77%
Total votes		14,354	100.00%
Republican hold			
