= Maureen Murphy Baronian =

American politician (1934–2001)

Member of the Connecticut House of Representatives from the 20th district
- In office 1981–1987
- Preceded by: Charles R. Matties
- Succeeded by: Richard T. Mulready

Personal details
- Born: August 5, 1934 White Plains, New York, U.S.
- Died: June 1, 2001 (aged 66) West Hartford, Connecticut, U.S.
- Party: Republican

Maureen Murphy Baronian (August 5, 1934 – June 1, 2001) was an American politician who served in the Connecticut House of Representatives from 1981 to 1987, representing the 20th district as a Republican.
