= The Hellenic Initiative =

- Founded: 2012; 14 years ago
- Type: Nonprofit
- Purpose: Promoting aid and development in Greece
- Location: New York City, United States.
- Method: Donations and development funding from the Greek Diaspora
- Key people: Andrew Liveris, Chairperson; Tina Courpas, Executive Director
- Website: www.thehellenicinitiative.org

The Hellenic Initiative is a humanitarian aid and economic development nonprofit organization established in 2012 for Greece. It appeals to the Greek diaspora to create jobs, support sustainable economic recovery and renew the country for people in crisis.
