= Michael Quinn (American politician) =

American politician (born 1968)

Member of the Connecticut House of Representatives from the 82nd district
- Incumbent
- Assumed office January 6, 2021
- Preceded by: Emil Altobello

Personal details
- Born: 1968 (age 57–58)
- Party: Democratic
- Education: American International College (BA); Cooley Law School (JD)

Michael Quinn (born 1968) is an American Democratic politician currently serving as a member of the Connecticut House of Representatives from the 82nd district, which includes the town of Middlefield, as well as part of Meriden, since 2021. Quinn was first elected to the seat in 2020 over Republican Mike Skelps. Quinn currently serves on the House Judiciary Committee, Public Safety and Security Committee, and the Executive and Legislative Nominations Committee. Quinn is also a fire photographer in his spare time.
