= Rachel Khanna =

American politician

Member of the Connecticut House of Representatives from the 149th district
- In office January 4, 2023 – January 8, 2025
- Preceded by: Kimberly Fiorello
- Succeeded by: Tina Courpas

Personal details
- Born: Rachel Newman; January 29, 1972 (age 54) Cannes, Alpes-Maritimes, France
- Party: Democratic
- Education: Bryn Mawr College (BA); Columbia University (MS)

Rachel Khanna (née Newman; born January 29, 1972) is an American marketing executive and politician. She was a member of the Connecticut House of Representatives for the 149th district, which encompasses parts of Greenwich and Stamford, for the Democratic Party from 2023 to 2025. She defeated incumbent Republican Kimberly Fiorello.

Before being elected to office she worked in marketing at Morgan Stanley Asset Management after working in market research at Euromonitor International. Since 2019, Khanna also served District 10 (which encompasses the Backcountry section of town) on the Greenwich RTM. As of 2025, she is a member of the Board of Selectman.

== Early life and education ==
Khanna was born January 29, 1972, in Cannes, Cote d'Azur, France to American parents. She attended high school there and returned to the United States to attend college. She graduated with a Bachelor of Arts from Bryn Mawr College in 1993 and received additional education at Columbia University in 1994, where she completed a Master's degree in Political science.

== Career ==
Khanna worked for Morgan Stanley and Euromonitor International before entering politics. In 2007, Khanna started an organic meal delivery service based in Banksville and serving Greenwich and Stamford and also published two cookbooks, one of them, Think Eat Cook Sustainably, is influencing food philosophy and influencers like Meaghan Markle. She is currently also on the board of trustees of the Jaideep and Rachel Khanna Foundation, a Greenwich non-profit organization.

Since 2019, she also served on the Representative Town Meeting (RTM) in Greenwich, for District 10.

== Connecticut House of Representatives ==
=== Elections ===
==== 2022 ====
In 2022, she was elected as the representative from the 149th district in the Connecticut House of Representatives for the Democratic Party defeating Republican Incumbent Kimberly Fiorello.

=== Tenure ===
She served on the Appropriations Committee, Government Administration & Elections Committee as well as the Transportation Committee.

== Electoral history ==
2022 Connecticut State House of Representatives election, 149th District
Party	Candidate	Votes	%
Democratic	Rachel Khanna	5,243	49.97
Republican	Kimberly Fiorello (incumbent)	5,141	49.00
Independent Party	Rachel Khanna	108	1.03
Total votes		10,492	100.00
Democratic gain from Republican			

== Personal life ==
In 1994, she married Indian-born banker and financier Jaideep Chand Khanna (b. 1963), in Manhattan, New York. They were introduced while working at Morgan Stanley in New York City.

They have four daughters and reside in Greenwich, Connecticut.
