= Emil Altobello =

American politician (1949–2025)

Emil "Buddy" Altobello

Member of the Connecticut House of Representatives from the 82nd district
- In office January 4, 1995 – January 6, 2021
- Preceded by: Thomas Luby
- Succeeded by: Michael Quinn

Personal details
- Born: July 8, 1949 Meriden, Connecticut, U.S.
- Died: February 6, 2025 (aged 75)
- Party: Democratic

Emil "Buddy" Altobello Jr. (July 8, 1949 – February 6, 2025) was an American politician who served in the Connecticut House of Representatives from the 82nd district from 1995 to 2021. He died on February 6, 2025, at the age of 75.
