= Clarice Osiecki =

American politician (1934–2007)

Member of the Connecticut House of Representatives from the 108th district
- In office 1973–1981
- Preceded by: Edward Tacinelli
- Succeeded by: Martin J. Smith Jr.

Personal details
- Born: October 16, 1934 Bethel, Connecticut, U.S.
- Died: October 28, 2007 (aged 73) Danbury, Connecticut, U.S.
- Party: Republican
- Spouse: Raymond Osiecki (divorced)
- Children: 3
- Education: Marymount College, Tarrytown (B.S.); Western Connecticut State University (M.A.)

Clarice A. Osiecki (October 16, 1934 – October 28, 2007) was an American politician who served in the Connecticut House of Representatives from 1973 to 1981, representing the 108th district as a Republican.

== Personal life and education ==
Osiecki was born on October 16, 1934, in Bethel, Connecticut. She attended Marymount College, Tarrytown, where she earned a degree in business administration, and Western Connecticut State University, where she earned a master's degree in history.

Osiecki moved to Danbury, Connecticut, in 1959. She was married to Raymond Osiecki, and they had three children. The couple later divorced.

Osiecki died on October 28, 2007, in Danbury. She was 73.

== Political career ==
Osiecki was elected to the Connecticut House of Representatives in 1972 and served four terms representing the 108th district as a Republican. She did not run for reelection in 1980 and was succeeded by fellow Republican Martin J. Smith Jr.
