= Connecticut's 20th House of Representatives district =

American legislative district

Connecticut's 20th State House of Representatives district
Representative
Kate Farrar; D

Connecticut's 20th House of Representatives district elects one member of the Connecticut House of Representatives. Its current representative is Kate Farrar. The majority of the district consists of the Elmwood neighborhood of West Hartford along with part of Newington.

== List of representatives ==
List of Representatives from Connecticut's 20th State House District
Representative	Party	Years	District home	Note
Henry T. Becker	Democratic	1967–1969	Manchester	Seat created
N. Charles Boggini	Democratic	1969–1973	Manchester	
Charles R. Matties	Republican	1973–1981	West Hartford	
Maureen Murphy Baronian	Republican	1981–1987	West Hartford	
Richard T. Mulready	Democratic	1987–1995	West Hartford	
Allen Hoffman	Republican	1995–1996	West Hartford	
John Ritter	Democratic	1997–1999	West Hartford	
David McCluskey	Democratic	1999–2011	West Hartford	
Joe Verrengia	Democratic	2011–2020	West Hartford	Did not seek reelection
Kate Farrar	Democratic	2021–	West Hartford	

== Recent elections ==
State Election 2024: House District 20
Party	Candidate	Votes	%	±%
Democratic	Kate Farrar	9,562	100	
Turnout		9,562		
Democratic hold		Swing		

State Election 2022: House District 20
Party	Candidate	Votes	%	±%
Democratic	Kate Farrar	5,946	62%	
Republican	Anastasia Yopp	3,576	38%	
Turnout		9,522	100%	
Democratic hold		Swing		

State Election 2020: House District 20
Party	Candidate	Votes	%	±%
Democratic	Kate Farrar	8,122	100%	
Turnout		8,122	100%	

Democratic Primary, August 11, 2020: House District 20
Party	Candidate	Votes	%	±%
Democratic	Kate Farrar	2,114	72%	
Democratic	Sherry Haller	822	28%	
Majority		1,292		
Turnout		2,936		

State Election 2018: House District 20
Party	Candidate	Votes	%	±%
Democratic	Joe Verrengia	7,220	100	
Turnout		7,220		
Democratic hold		Swing		

State Election 2016: House District 20
Party	Candidate	Votes	%	±%
Democratic	Joe Verrengia		100	
Turnout				
Democratic hold		Swing		

State Election 2014: House District 20
Party	Candidate	Votes	%	±%
Democratic	Joe Verrengia		100	
Turnout				
Democratic hold		Swing		

State Election 2012: House District 20
Party	Candidate	Votes	%	±%
Democratic	Joe Verrengia	7,138	76.2%	
Republican	Chad Thompson	2,231	23.8%	
Turnout		9,369		
Democratic hold		Swing		
