= Connecticut's 82nd House of Representatives district =

American legislative district

Connecticut's 82nd State House of Representatives district
Representative
Michael Quinn; D

Connecticut's 82nd House of Representatives district elects one member of the Connecticut House of Representatives. It consists of parts of the city of Meriden. It has been represented by Democrat Michael Quinn since 2021.

== List of representatives ==
List of Representatives from Connecticut's 82nd State House District
Representative	Party	Years	District home	Note
Pasquale DeBaise	Democratic	1967–1973	Wallingford	Seat created
Walter A. Evilia	Republican	1973–1975	Meriden	
Patsy J. Mesite	Democratic	1975–1977	Meriden	
Robert Bennett	Republican	1977–1979	Meriden	
Robert C. Sorensen	Democratic	1979–1985	Meriden	
Richard P. Antonetti	Republican	1985–1987	Meriden	
Thomas S. Luby	Democratic	1987–1995	Meriden	
Emil Altobello	Democratic	1995–2021	Meriden	
Michael Quinn	Democratic	2021–	Meriden	

== Recent elections ==
=== 2020 ===
2020 Connecticut State House of Representatives election, District 82
Party	Candidate	Votes	%
Democratic	Michael D. Quinn	5,810	49.40
Republican	Mike Skelps	5,227	44.44
Independent Party	Ernestine Holloway	412	3.50
Working Families	Michael D. Quinn	313	2.66
Total votes		11,762	100.00
Democratic hold			

=== 2018 ===
2018 Connecticut House of Representatives election, District 82
Party	Candidate	Votes	%
Democratic	Emil Altobello (Incumbent)	5,401	59.4
Republican	Ernestine Holloway	3,699	40.6
Total votes		9,100	100.00
Democratic hold			

=== 2016 ===
2016 Connecticut House of Representatives election, District 82
Party	Candidate	Votes	%
Democratic	Emil Altobello (Incumbent)	7,284	100.0
Total votes		7,284	100.00
Democratic hold			

=== 2014 ===
2014 Connecticut House of Representatives election, District 82
Party	Candidate	Votes	%
Democratic	Emil Altobello (Incumbent)	4,230	56.9
Republican	Josh Broekstra	3,205	43.1
Total votes		7,435	100.00
Democratic hold			

=== 2012 ===
2012 Connecticut House of Representatives election, District 82
Party	Candidate	Votes	%
Democratic	Emil Altobello (Incumbent)	6,428	67.3
Republican	Arline J. Dunlop	3,120	32.7
Total votes		9,548	100.00
Democratic hold			
