= Connecticut's 108th House of Representatives district =

American legislative district

Connecticut's 108th State House of Representatives district
Representative
Patrick Callahan; R

Connecticut's 108th House of Representatives district elects one member of the Connecticut House of Representatives. It consists of the town of Sherman as well as parts of New Fairfield, Danbury and New Milford. It has been represented by Republican Patrick Callahan since 2021.

== List of representatives ==
Representative	Party	Years	District home	Note
Matteo A. Ruoppolo	Democratic	1967 – 1969	New Haven	
Edward J. Tacinelli	Democratic	1969 – 1973	New Haven	
Clarice Osiecki	Republican	1973 – 1981	Danbury	
Martin J. Smith Jr.	Republican	1981 – 1983	Danbury	
Lawrence M. Riefberg	Democratic	1983 – 1985	Danbury	
Norma Gyle	Republican	1985 – 1999	New Fairfield	
Mary Ann Carson	Republican	1999 – 2011	New Fairfield	
Richard A. Smith	Republican	2011 – 2021	New Fairfield	
Patrick Callahan	Republican	2021 – present	New Fairfield	

== Recent elections ==
=== 2022 ===
2022 Connecticut State House of Representatives election, 108th District
Party	Candidate	Votes	%
Republican	Patrick Callahan (incumbent)	5,976	57.83
Democratic	Jeff Ginsburg	4,357	42.17
Total votes		8,714	100.0

=== 2020 ===
2020 Connecticut State House of Representatives election, District 107
Party	Candidate	Votes	%
Republican	Patrick Callahan	7,002	54.83
Democratic	Danette Onofrio	5,768	45.17
Total votes		12,770	100.00
Republican hold			

=== 2018 ===
2018 Connecticut House of Representatives election, District 108
Party	Candidate	Votes	%
Republican	Richard Smith	6,383	100.00
Republican hold			

=== 2016 ===
2016 Connecticut House of Representatives election, District 108
Party	Candidate	Votes	%
Republican	Richard Smith	8,133	100.00
Republican hold			

=== 2014 ===
2014 Connecticut House of Representatives election, District 108
Party	Candidate	Votes	%
Republican	Richard Smith	4,951	100.00
Republican hold			

=== 2012 ===
2012 Connecticut House of Representatives election, District 108
Party	Candidate	Votes	%
Republican	Richard Smith	7,632	100.00
Republican hold			
