= Livvy Floren =

American politician

Member of the Connecticut House of Representatives from the 149th district
- In office January 3, 2001 – January 6, 2021
- Preceded by: Janet Lockton
- Succeeded by: Kimberly Fiorello

Personal details
- Born: Olivia Richardson; October 13, 1942 (age 83) New York City, New York, U.S.
- Party: Republican
- Spouse: Douglas Carl Floren (m. 1967; died 2026)
- Children: 4
- Education: Vassar College (AB); Adelphi University (MBA); Manhattanville College (MAT)
- Occupation: Public relations executive; philanthropist; teacher; politician
- Website: oliviafloren.com

Olivia Richardson Floren (née Richardson; born October 13, 1942) is an American public relations executive, philanthropist and former politician who served ten terms in the Connecticut House of Representatives from the 149th district from 2001 to 2021.

== Early life and education ==
Floren was born Olivia Richardson on October 13, 1942, in Manhattan, New York City, the older of two daughters, to Charles Melbourne Richardson (1910–1978), a hotel manager originally from Tennessee, and Jamie Richardson (née Bright; 1911–2005). She has a sister, Carol Richardson (born 1946). She was primarily raised in Queens, New York.

She completed a Bachelor of Arts (AB) at Vassar College graduating in 1964. She later completed a Master of Business Administration at Adelphi University and a Master of Arts in Teaching (MAT) at Manhattanville College.

== Career ==
Floren initially worked as a Public Relations executive for Reddy Communications Incorporated in Greenwich, Connecticut, from 1964 to 1986. Since 1986 she was a substitute teacher at Greenwich Country Day School and engaged as campaign manager for the Janet K. Lockton campaign, her predecessor in the Connecticut House of Representatives for the Republican Party. She has been a member and trustee of several civic organizations.

=== Philanthropy/Other ===
Floren and her husband Doug are active philanthropists and had donated $10 million to Dartmouth College in Hanover, New Hampshire which was contributed towards construction of the Varsity House now bearing their family name. They also contributed an undisclosed amount to a $1.5m project on Tod's Point in Old Greenwich, Connecticut, which was opened as Floren Family Environmental Center in 2011. The family has two funding vehicles, Floren Family Foundation, and The Henry Gustav Floren Foundation both in Greenwich, Connecticut.

== Politics ==
She initially served on the Representative Town Meeting (RTM) in Greenwich for several years and was also a member of the town's Board of Estimate and Taxation. She was first elected to serve in the Connecticut House of Representatives in 2000, succeeding Janet Lockton. Floren served ten terms between 2001 and 2021. She was an assistant leader in her caucus, a ranking member of the legislatures bonding subcommittee and a member of the house's Finance, Revenue and Bonding Committee as well as the Insurance and Real Estate committee.

== Personal life ==
In 1967, Richardson married Douglas Carl Floren (1942–2026), son of Swedish immigrants Carl Gustav Floren and Greta Floren (née Bjorklund), both of Queens, New York. He attended Trinity School where he was introduced to his wife in middle school. He later graduated from Dartmouth College in 1963. They had four children;

- Jennifer Floren Sozzi (b. 1971)
- Melissa Floren Filippone (b. 1975), married to David Filippone
- David Floren (b. 1978), a venture capitalist based in Mount Pleasant, South Carolina
- Clay Floren (b. 1978), a movie producer based in New York

Floren has been a resident of Greenwich, Connecticut, for over fifty years. They also retain a winter residence in Boynton Beach, Florida.
