= Kate Farrar =

American politician

Member of the Connecticut House of Representatives from the 20th district
- Incumbent
- Assumed office January 6, 2021
- Preceded by: Joe Verrengia

Personal details
- Born: 1979 (age 46–47)
- Party: Democratic
- Education: University of Connecticut (BA); Syracuse University (MA)

Kate C. Farrar (born 1979) is an American politician serving as a member of the Connecticut House of Representatives from the 20th district. Elected in November 2020, she assumed office on January 6, 2021.

== Education ==
Farrar earned a Bachelor of Arts degree in political science from the University of Connecticut and a Master of Arts in public administration from Syracuse University.

== Career ==
In 2002 and 2003, Farrar worked as a lobbyist for Judith Blei Government Relations. She was then a field coordinator for the John Kerry 2004 presidential campaign in Wisconsin. From 2005 to 2018, she was the associate director of national programs and policy for Wider Opportunities for Women. From 2008 to 2015, she was the vice president of the American Association of University Women for campus leadership programs. From 2016 to 2020, Farrar worked as the executive director of the Connecticut Women's Education and Legal Fund. Farrar was elected to the Connecticut House of Representatives in November 2020 and assumed office on January 6, 2021.
