= Connecticut's 33rd House of Representatives district =

American legislative district

Connecticut's 33rd State House of Representatives district
Representative
Brandon Chafee; D

Connecticut's 33rd House of Representatives district elects one member of the Connecticut House of Representatives. It encompasses parts of Middletown and has been represented by Democrat Brandon Chafee since 2021.

== List of representatives ==
List of Representatives from Connecticut's 33rd State House District
Representative	Party	Years	District home	Note
Edward W. Siry	Democratic	1967–1969	Plainville	Seat created
Joseph N. Pugliese	Republican	1969–1973	Plainville	
Raymond J. Dzialo	Democratic	1973–1979	Middletown	
Paul Gionfriddo	Democratic	1979–1991	Middletown	
Vincent J. Loffredo	Democratic	1991–1993	Middletown	
Joseph Serra	Democratic	1993–2021	Middletown	
Brandon Chafee	Democratic	2021–	Middletown	

== Recent elections ==
=== 2020 ===
2020 Connecticut State House of Representatives election, District 33
Party	Candidate	Votes	%
Democratic	Brandon Chafee	6,618	59.98
Republican	Linda Szynkowicz	3,689	33.43
Working Families	Brandon Chafee	457	4.14
Independent Party	Linda Szynkowicz	270	2.45
Total votes		11,034	100.00
Democratic hold			

=== 2018 ===
2018 Connecticut House of Representatives election, District 33
Party	Candidate	Votes	%
Democratic	Joseph Serra (incumbent)	5,356	62.1
Republican	Linda Synkowicz	3,270	37.9
Total votes		8,626	100.00
Democratic hold			

=== 2016 ===
2016 Connecticut House of Representatives election, District 33
Party	Candidate	Votes	%
Democratic	Joseph Serra (incumbent)	5,648	57.76
Republican	Linda Synkowicz	4,130	42.24
Total votes		8,626	100.00
Democratic hold			

=== 2014 ===
2014 Connecticut House of Representatives election, District 33
Party	Candidate	Votes	%
Democratic	Joseph Serra (incumbent)	3,966	62.1
Republican	Linda Synkowicz	2,418	37.9
Total votes		6,384	100.00
Democratic hold			

=== 2012 ===
2012 Connecticut House of Representatives election, District 33
Party	Candidate	Votes	%
Democratic	Joseph Serra (incumbent)	6,349	71.6
Republican	Callie L. Grippo	2,519	28.4
Total votes		8,868	100.00
Democratic hold			
