= Richard A. Smith (Connecticut politician) =

American politician

Member of the Connecticut House of Representatives from the 108th district
- In office 2011 – January 6, 2021
- Preceded by: Mary Ann Carson
- Succeeded by: Patrick Callahan

Personal details
- Party: Republican
- Spouse: Elizabeth
- Children: 2

Richard A. Smith is an American politician who served in the Connecticut House of Representatives from 2011 to 2021, representing the 108th district. Smith has sponsored 88 bills. He is a member of the Republican Party.
