= Joseph Serra =

American politician (1940–2024)

Member of the Connecticut House of Representatives from the 33rd district
- In office January 6, 1993 – January 6, 2021
- Preceded by: Vincent Loffredo
- Succeeded by: Brandon Chafee

Personal details
- Born: Joseph C. Serra; August 8, 1940 Middletown, Connecticut, U.S.
- Died: November 28, 2024 (aged 84) Middletown, Connecticut, U.S.
- Party: Democratic

Joseph C. Serra (August 8, 1940 – November 28, 2024) was an American politician who served in the Connecticut House of Representatives from the 33rd district from 1993 to 2021. Serra died on November 28, 2024, at the age of 84.
