= 2020 Connecticut elections =

The 2020 Connecticut state elections were held on Tuesday, November 3, 2020. All necessary primary elections for the Republican and Democratic parties were held on Tuesday, August 11, 2020.

== Federal offices ==
=== President of the United States ===
2020 United States presidential election in Connecticut
| Party | Candidate | Votes | % | ±% |
|---|---|---|---|---|
| Democratic | Joe Biden Kamala Harris | 1,080,831 | 59.24% | +4.67% |
| Republican | Donald Trump Mike Pence | 715,291 | 39.21% | −1.72% |
| Libertarian | Jo Jorgensen Spike Cohen | 20,227 | 1.11% | −1.85% |
| Green | Howie Hawkins Angela Walker | 7,538 | 0.41% | −0.98% |
| Write-in | | 544 | 0.03% | |
| Total votes | | 1,824,280 | 100.00% | |

=== United States House of Representatives ===
Incumbent Democrats won re-election to all five Connecticut seats in the United States House of Representatives.

| District | Democratic | | Republican | | Others | | Total | | Result |
| District | Votes | % | Votes | % | Votes | % | Votes | % | Result |
|---|---|---|---|---|---|---|---|---|---|
| District 1 | 222,668 | 63.76% | 122,111 | 34.96% | 4,458 | 1.28% | 349,237 | 100.0% | Democratic hold |
| District 2 | 217,982 | 59.37% | 140,340 | 38.22% | 8,859 | 2.41% | 367,181 | 100.0% | Democratic hold |
| District 3 | 203,265 | 58.73% | 137,596 | 39.76% | 5,240 | 1.51% | 346,101 | 100.0% | Democratic hold |
| District 4 | 223,832 | 62.15% | 130,627 | 36.27% | 5,666 | 1.57% | 360,125 | 100.0% | Democratic hold |
| District 5 | 192,484 | 55.07% | 151,988 | 43.48% | 5,052 | 1.45% | 349,524 | 100.0% | Democratic hold |
| Total | 1,060,231 | 59.83% | 682,662 | 38.52% | 29,275 | 1.65% | 1,772,168 | 100.0% | |

== General Assembly ==
=== State Senate ===
Democrats won 24 to the Republicans' 12, expanding their majority by 2 seats.

↓
| 24 | 12 |
| Democratic | Republican |

| Parties | Candidates | Seats | | | | Popular Vote | | |
| Parties | Candidates | 2018 | 2020 | +/- | Strength | Vote | % | Change |
|---|---|---|---|---|---|---|---|---|
| Democratic | 35 | 22 | 24 | ▲2 | 61.11% | 925,028 | 54.82% | ▲1.72% |
| Republican | 33 | 14 | 12 | ▼2 | 38.89% | 737,405 | 43.70% | ▲0.28% |
| Independent Party | 4 (Note: In addition, the Independent Party of Connecticut cross-endorsed 15 candidates, 6 Democrats and 9 Republicans.) | 0 | 0 | Steady | 0.00% | 27,037 | 1.60% | ▼0.34% |
| Working Families | 0 (Note: In addition, the Working Families Party of Connecticut cross-endorsed 17 candidates, all Democrats.) | 0 | 0 | Steady | 0.00% | 16,695 | 0.99% | ▼0.47% |
| Libertarian | 3 | 0 | 0 | Steady | 0.00% | 2,567 | 0.15% | Steady |
| Green | 1 | 0 | 0 | Steady | 0.00% | 952 | 0.06% | ▼0.02% |
| Other parties and Write-ins | 5 | 0 | 0 | Steady | 0.00% | 2,877 | 0.17% | Steady |
| Total | 81 | 36 | 36 | 0 | 100.00% | 1,687,529 | 100.00% | - |

=== State House of Representatives ===
Democrats won 97 seats while Republicans won 54.

↓
| 97 | 54 |
| Democratic | Republican |

| Parties | Seats | | | |
| Parties | 2018 | 2020 | +/- | Strength |
|---|---|---|---|---|
| Democratic | 92 | 97 | ▲5 | 64.24% |
| Republican | 59 | 54 | ▼5 | 35.76% |
| Total | 151 | 151 | 151 | 100.00% |

== See also ==
- Elections in Connecticut
- Political party strength in Connecticut
