= Joseph Verrengia =

American politician

Member of the Connecticut House of Representatives from the 20th district
- In office February 25, 2011 – January 6, 2021
- Preceded by: David McCluskey
- Succeeded by: Kate Farrar

Personal details
- Born: February 9, 1964 (age 62) West Hartford, Connecticut, U.S.
- Party: Democratic

Joseph Verrengia (born February 9, 1964) is an American politician who served in the Connecticut House of Representatives from the 20th district from 2011 to 2021.
