= Brandon Chafee =

American politician

Member of the Connecticut House of Representatives from the 33rd district
- Incumbent
- Assumed office 2021
- Preceded by: Joseph Serra

Personal details
- Born: Middletown, Connecticut, U.S.
- Party: Democratic
- Spouse: Meghan
- Education: Central Connecticut State University; University of Connecticut School of Business (MBA)
- Profession: Politician

Brandon Chafee is an American politician currently serving as a state representative in the Connecticut House of Representatives, representing the 33rd District since 2021. Prior to running for the seat, Chafee served as the treasurer of the Middletown Democratic Party. On November 3, 2020, Chafee won the election for the 33rd District seat after defeating Republican challenger Lynda Szynkowicz. In the House, Chafee serves as a member of the Transportation and Environment Committees as well as the Finance, Revenue and Bonding Committee.
