= Kimberly Fiorello =

American politician (born 1975)

Member of the Connecticut House of Representatives from the 149th district
- In office January 6, 2021 – January 4, 2023
- Preceded by: Livvy Floren
- Succeeded by: Rachel Khanna

Personal details
- Born: Kimberly Song; October 20, 1975 (age 50) Seoul, South Korea
- Party: Republican
- Spouse: Jonathan Fiorello
- Children: 4
- Education: South Lakes High School
- Alma mater: United States Military Academy; Harvard University (BA)
- Website: www.kimberlyfor149.com

Kimberly Song Fiorello (née Song; born October 20, 1975) is an American politician who served as a member of the Connecticut House of Representatives from the 149th District, which encompasses parts of Greenwich and Stamford, for the Republican Party from January 6, 2021 to January 4, 2023. Earlier in her political career she served on the Representative Town Meeting (RTM) in Greenwich, from 2017 to 2020. She was part of Connecticut's Conservative Caucus.

== Early life and education ==
Fiorello was born Kimberly Song on October 20, 1975, in Seoul, South Korea, and grew up in Reston, Virginia. Her father worked for the United States Department of Defense, while her mother owned and operated a coffee shop. She is a grandchild of a refugee from North Korea. She initially attended the United States Military Academy in West Point, New York for one year before transferring to Harvard College, where she earned a Bachelor of Arts (AB) in Economics.

== Career ==
She started her career after college in the analyst training program at Salomon Brothers in New York ultimately becoming a reporter for the Far Eastern Economic Review and the Wall Street Journal in Hong Kong. Fiorello also engaged as a line chef at Wallace Restaurant in New York and several entrepreneurial activities such as becoming an inventor of a storage bag design (U.S. patent holder) and former state director for a non-profit organization in education. She also served as active community volunteer for the Greenwich Historical Society and Grace Church of Greenwich.

== Political career ==
Fiorello first entered state politics when she ran for the 149th District seat. In November 2020, she won the election for the seat. Since taking office, Fiorello, like many other politicians in Fairfield County, has been very vocal in regards to local control over zoning, among other issues.

Fiorello spoke on the House floor against legislation designed to make it easier to report instances of sexual misconduct on college campuses. Addressing a section of the bill that allowed amnesty for underaged drinking in cases of sexual assault or rape, which was included to help encourage student-survivors to report their experiences, Fiorello said, "I want to say if you care about your friends, and you see the potential for this kind of violence and harm that can come to your friends, and drinking and doing drugs is related to that, then don't drink. Don't do the drugs." Mike Cerulli, former president of the Connecticut Federation of College Democrats, criticized Fiorello, saying her comments "reflect a fairly common narrative" that blames victims — "if they hadn't been drinking, if they hadn't dressed a certain way" then they would not have been sexually assaulted. Fiorello ultimately voted in favor of the bill, which was passed 151–0.

In March 2022, Fiorello entered into a dispute with a 20-year-old college student testifying in favor of an affordable housing bill. Alan Cavagnaro, a sophomore at Manchester Community College, testified that many people his age are leaving the state because it was too expensive to live there. Fiorello, opposing the bill, asked Cavagnaro whether he believed housing was a right, to which he stated yes. Fiorello responded that "housing is not a right, because housing is built by other people", and is instead a "want".

When debating on whether to make Juneteenth a state holiday, Fiorello, a member of the state's Conservative Caucus, called the Three-fifths Compromise, which counted enslaved Black people as three-fifths of a person, a "compromise in favor towards freedom". Fiorello's comments drew rebuke from Robyn Porter, a Black Representative from New Haven, who pushed back on Fiorello's comments by responding "the fact that Black people — men, women and children — were not seen as whole human beings for the purposes of taxation and representation, that is what the Three-Fifths Compromise was rooted and grounded in". Fiorello voted in favor of the bill, which was passed 148–1.

In November 2022, Fiorello narrowly lost her re-election bid to Democratic candidate Rachel Khanna.

== Electoral history ==
2020 Connecticut House of Representatives election, District 149
Party	Candidate	Votes	%
Republican	Kimberly Fiorello	7,203	51.40
Democratic	Kathleen Stowe	6,809	48.60
Total votes		14,012	100.00
Republican hold			

2022 Connecticut House of Representatives election, District 149
Party	Candidate	Votes	%
Democratic	Rachel Khanna	5,243	49.97
Independent Party	Rachel Khanna	108	1.03
Total	Rachel Khanna	5,351	51.00
Republican	Kimberly Fiorello	5,141	49.00
Total votes		10,492	100.00
Democratic gain from Republican		Swing	-2.4

== Personal life ==
Fiorello is married to Jonathan "Jon" Fiorello (b. 1976), who is a managing director at KKR. They reside in Greenwich and have four children.
