= Connecticut's 35th House of Representatives district =

American legislative district

Connecticut's 35th State House of Representatives district
Representative
Chris Aniskovich; R

Connecticut's 35th House of Representatives district elects one member of the Connecticut House of Representatives. It consists of the towns of Clinton, Killingworth, and parts of Westbrook. It has been represented by Republican Chris Aniskovich since January 4, 2023.

== List of representatives ==
List of Representatives from Connecticut's 35th House District
Representative	Party	Years	District home	Note
Kenneth J. Rock	Democratic	1967–1973	Bristol	Seat created
John N. DeMerell	Republican	1973–1983	Essex	
Sidney J. Holbrook	Republican	1983–1997	Westbrook	
Robert A. Landino	Democratic	1997–2001	Old Saybrook	
Brian O'Connor	Democratic	2001–2011	Westbrook	
James Crawford	Democratic	2011–2013	Westbrook	
Tom Vicino	Democratic	2013–2015	Clinton	
Jesse MacLachlan	Republican	2015–2021	Westbrook	
Christine Goupil	Democratic	2021–2023	Clinton	
Chris Aniskovich	Republican	2023–	Clinton	

== Recent elections ==
=== 2024 ===
2024 Connecticut's 35th House of Representatives district election
- Precinct results Aniskovich 50-60% Letteri 50-60%

2024 Connecticut State House of Representatives election, 35th District
Party	Candidate	Votes	%
Republican	Chris Aniskovich (incumbent)	7,252	50.5%
Democratic	Cinzia Letteri	7,102	49.5%
Republican hold			

=== 2022 ===
2022 Connecticut's 35th House of Representatives district election
- Precinct results Aniskovich 50-60% Goupil 40-50%

2022 Connecticut State House of Representatives election, 35th District
Party	Candidate	Votes	%
Republican	Chris Aniskovich	5,841	50.96%
Democratic	Christine Goupil (incumbent)	5,374	46.89%
Independent Party	Christine Goupil (incumbent)	162	1.41%
Green	Hugh Birdsall	84	0.73%
Total votes		11,461	100.00%
Republican gain from Democratic			

=== 2020 ===
2020 Connecticut's 35th House of Representatives district election
- Precinct results Goupil 50-60% Hall 50-60%

2020 Connecticut State House of Representatives election, District 35
Party	Candidate	Votes	%
Republican	John L. Hall III	6,793	47.78
Democratic	Christine Goupil	6,650	46.77
Green	John May	358	2.52
Independent Party	Christine Goupil	264	1.86
Working Families	Christine Goupil	153	1.08
Total votes		14,218	100.00
Democratic gain from Republican			

=== 2018 ===
2018 Connecticut's 35th House of Representatives district election
- Precinct results MacLachlan 50-60%

2018 Connecticut House of Representatives election, District 35
Party	Candidate	Votes	%
Republican	Jesse MacLachlan (Incumbent)	6,240	52.5
Democratic	Jason Adler	5,461	46.0
Green	Madeleine Leveile	181	1.5
Total votes		11,882	100.00
Republican hold			

=== 2016 ===
2016 Connecticut's 35th House of Representatives district election
- Precinct results MacLachlan 50-60% 60-70%

2016 Connecticut House of Representatives election, District 35
Party	Candidate	Votes	%
Republican	Jesse MacLachlan (Incumbent)	7,729	59.70
Democratic	Ellen Dahlgren	4,854	37.49
Green	Ian Barron	168	1.30
Libertarian	Austin Coco	195	1.51
Total votes		12,946	100.00
Republican hold			

=== 2014 ===
2014 Connecticut House of Representatives election, District 35
Party	Candidate	Votes	%
Republican	Jesse MacLachlan	4,836	51.3
Democratic	Tom Vicino (Incumbent)	3,878	41.1
Independent Party	Jesse MacLachlan	405	4.5
Working Families	Tom Vicino (Incumbent)	316	3.3
Total votes		9,435	100.00
Republican gain from Democratic			

=== 2012 ===
2012 Connecticut House of Representatives election, District 35
Party	Candidate	Votes	%
Democratic	Tom Vicino (Incumbent)	6,326	54.9
Republican	John A. Samperi	5,207	45.1
Total votes		11,533	100.00
Democratic hold			

=== 2010 ===
2010 Connecticut House of Representatives election, District 35
Party	Candidate	Votes	%
Democratic	James Crawford	4,744	50.1
Republican	David L. Denvir	4,721	49.9
Total votes		9,465	100.00
Democratic hold			

=== 2008 ===
2008 Connecticut House of Representatives election, District 35
Party	Candidate	Votes	%
Democratic	Brian J. O'Connor (Incumbent)	9,096	100.00
Total votes		9,096	100.00
Democratic hold			

=== 2006 ===
2006 Connecticut House of Representatives election, District 35
Party	Candidate	Votes	%
Democratic	Brian J. O'Connor (Incumbent)	6,217	70.0
Republican	Darlene Jones	2,668	30.0
Total votes		8,885	100.00
Democratic hold			

=== 2004 ===
2004 Connecticut House of Representatives election, District 35
Party	Candidate	Votes	%
Democratic	Brian J. O'Connor (Incumbent)	7,797	100.0
Total votes		7,797	100.00
Democratic hold			

=== 2002 ===
2002 Connecticut House of Representatives election, District 35
Party	Candidate	Votes	%
Democratic	Brian J. O'Connor (Incumbent)	4,626	55.1
Republican	Sidney J. Holbrook	3,764	44.9
Total votes		8,390	100.00
Democratic hold			

=== 2000 ===
2000 Connecticut House of Representatives election, District 35
Party	Candidate	Votes	%
Democratic	Brian J. O'Connor	5,724	54.8
Republican	Dan Gallagher	4,713	45.2
Total votes		10,437	100.00
Democratic hold			

=== 1998 ===
1998 Connecticut House of Representatives election, District 35
Party	Candidate	Votes	%
Democratic	Robert A. Landino (Incumbent)	3,893	51.3
Republican	Dan Gallagher	4,713	48.7
Total votes		7,588	100.00
Democratic hold			

=== 1996 ===
1996 Connecticut House of Representatives election, District 35
Party	Candidate	Votes	%
Democratic	Robert A. Landino	5,390	55.6
Republican	Dan Gallagher	4,303	44.4
Total votes		9,693	100.00
Democratic gain from Republican			

=== 1994 ===
1994 Connecticut House of Representatives election, District 35
Party	Candidate	Votes	%
Republican	Sidney J. Holbrook (Incumbent)	5,464	100.00
Total votes		5,464	100.00
Republican hold			
