= Christine Goupil =

American politician

Member of the Connecticut House of Representatives from the 35th district
- In office 6 January 2021 – 4 January 2023
- Succeeded by: Chris Aniskovich

Personal details
- Party: Democratic

Christine Goupil is an American politician who served as a Connecticut State Representative in the 35th District of the Connecticut House of Representatives, which encompasses the towns of Clinton, Killingworth and parts of Westbrook. Goupil was first elected to the seat in 2020 after defeating Republican challenger John Hall III. She began her term on January 6, 2021, and served as a member of the House Transportation and Human Services Committees and the Vice Chair of the Planning and Development Committee. Christine ran for reelection in 2022 but ultimately lost to Republican challenger Chris Aniskovich She ended her term January 4, 2023.
