= Connecticut's 62nd House of Representatives district =

American legislative district

Connecticut's 62nd State House of Representatives district
Representative
Mark Anderson; R

Connecticut's 62nd House of Representatives district elects one member of the Connecticut House of Representatives. Its current representative is Republican Mark Anderson. The district consists of the towns of Barkhamsted, Granby, Hartland, and New Hartford.

== List of representatives ==
List of Representatives from Connecticut's 62nd State House District
Representative	Party	Years	District home	Note
Vincent A. Laudone	Republican	1967–1969	Norwich	Seat created
Frederick C. Berberich Jr.	Republican	1969–1973	Norwich	
Russell L. Post Jr.	Republican	1973–1979	Canton	Elected to the Connecticut State Senate
Otto C. Neumann	Republican	1979–1987	Granby	Appointed to Public Utility Control Commission
Joel Gordes	Democratic	1987–1991	Colebrook	Won special election; did not seek reelection
Richard Ferrari	Republican	1991–2009	East Granby	Defeated for reelection
Annie Hornish	Democratic	2009–2011	Granby	Defeated for reelection
William Simanski	Republican	2011–2021	Granby	
Mark Anderson	Republican	2021–present	Granby	Incumbent
Kim Becker	Democratic	2027 member-elect		

== Recent elections ==
State Election 2010: House District 62
Party	Candidate	Votes	%	±%
Republican	William Simanski	5,320	50.3	+2.6
Democratic	Maryanne "Annie" Hornish	5,050	47.7	+0.4
Working Families	Maryanne "Annie" Hornish	209	2.0	−3.0
Majority		61	0.6	−4.0
Turnout		10,579		
Republican gain from Democratic		Swing	+2.6	

State Election 2008: House District 62
Party	Candidate	Votes	%	±%
Republican	Richard Ferrari	6,239	47.7	−44.5
Democratic	Maryanne "Annie" Hornish	6,190	47.3	+47.3
Working Families	Maryanne "Annie" Hornish	652	5.0	−2.6
Majority		603	4.6	−89.4
Turnout		13,081		
Democratic gain from Republican		Swing	+45.9	

State Election 2006: House District 62
Party	Candidate	Votes	%	±%
Republican	Richard Ferrari	6,082	92.4	+1.0
Working Families	Adam Martinez	499	7.6	−1.0
Majority		5,583	84.8	+2.0
Turnout		6,581		
Republican hold		Swing	+1.0	

State Election 2004: House District 62
Party	Candidate	Votes	%	±%
Republican	Richard Ferrari	7,695	91.4	−2.4
Working Families	Paul J. Nyerick	726	8.6	+2.4
Majority		6,969	82.8	−4.8
Turnout		8,421		
Republican hold		Swing	-2.4	

State Election 2002: House District 62
Party	Candidate	Votes	%	±%
Republican	Richard Ferrari	5,816	93.8	−6.2
Working Families	Paul J. Nyerick	385	6.2	+6.2
Majority		5,431	87.6	−12.4
Turnout		6,201		
Republican hold		Swing	-6.2	

State Election 2000: House District 62
Party	Candidate	Votes	%	±%
Republican	Richard Ferrari	8,174	100.0	+27.8
Majority		8,174	100.0	+55.4
Turnout		8,174		
Republican hold		Swing	+27.8	

State Election 1998: House District 62
Party	Candidate	Votes	%	±%
Republican	Richard Ferrari	6,095	72.2	+15.4
Democratic	Bill Rocks	2,338	27.8	−15.4
Majority		3,757	44.6	+30.9
Turnout		8,433		
Republican hold		Swing	+15.4	

State Election 1996: House District 62
Party	Candidate	Votes	%	±%
Republican	Richard Ferrari	6,401	56.8	−43.2
Democratic	Carmella Lattizori	4,862	43.2	+43.2
Majority		1,539	13.7	−86.3
Turnout		11,263		
Republican hold		Swing	-43.2	

State Election 1994: House District 62
Party	Candidate	Votes	%	±%
Republican	Richard Ferrari	6,399	100.0	+55.5
Majority		6,399	100.0	+91.4
Turnout		6,399		
Republican hold		Swing	+55.5	

State Election 1992: House District 62
Party	Candidate	Votes	%	±%
Republican	Richard Ferrari	5,298	44.5	−15.1
Democratic	Francis P. Lynch	4,273	35.9	−4.5
A Connecticut Party (1990)	Louise Hull	2,338	19.6	+19.6
Majority		1,025	8.6	−10.5
Turnout		11,909		
Republican hold		Swing	-12.3	

State Election 1990: House District 62
Party	Candidate	Votes	%	±%
Republican	Richard Ferrari	5,334	59.6	+21.9
Democratic	Andrew W. Bray	3,623	40.4	−18.8
Majority		1,711	19.1	−2.4
Turnout		8,957		
Republican gain from Democratic		Swing		

State Election 1988: House District 62
Party	Candidate	Votes	%	±%
Democratic	Joel Gordes	6,701	59.2	
Republican	Richard L. Calder	4,265	37.7	
Independent	Mary A. Walsche	348	3.1	
Majority		2,436	21.5	−5.3
Turnout		11,314		
Democratic hold		Swing		

State Election 1986: House District 62
Party	Candidate	Votes	%	±%
Republican	Otto C. Neumann	4,901	63.4	−36.6
Democratic	Carol A. Grenier	2,830	36.6	+36.6
Majority		2,071	26.8	−73.2
Turnout		7,731		
Republican hold		Swing	-36.6	

State Election 1984: House District 62
Party	Candidate	Votes	%	±%
Republican	Otto C. Neumann	7,752	100.0	
Majority		7,752	100.0	
Turnout		7,752		
Republican hold		Swing		
