= Otto Neumann =

Otto Neumann may refer to:

- Otto Neumann (athlete), German sprinter
- Otto Neumann (artist), German Expressionist painter and printmaker
- Otto C. Neumann, American politician
