= Mark Anderson (Connecticut politician) =

American politician from Connecticut

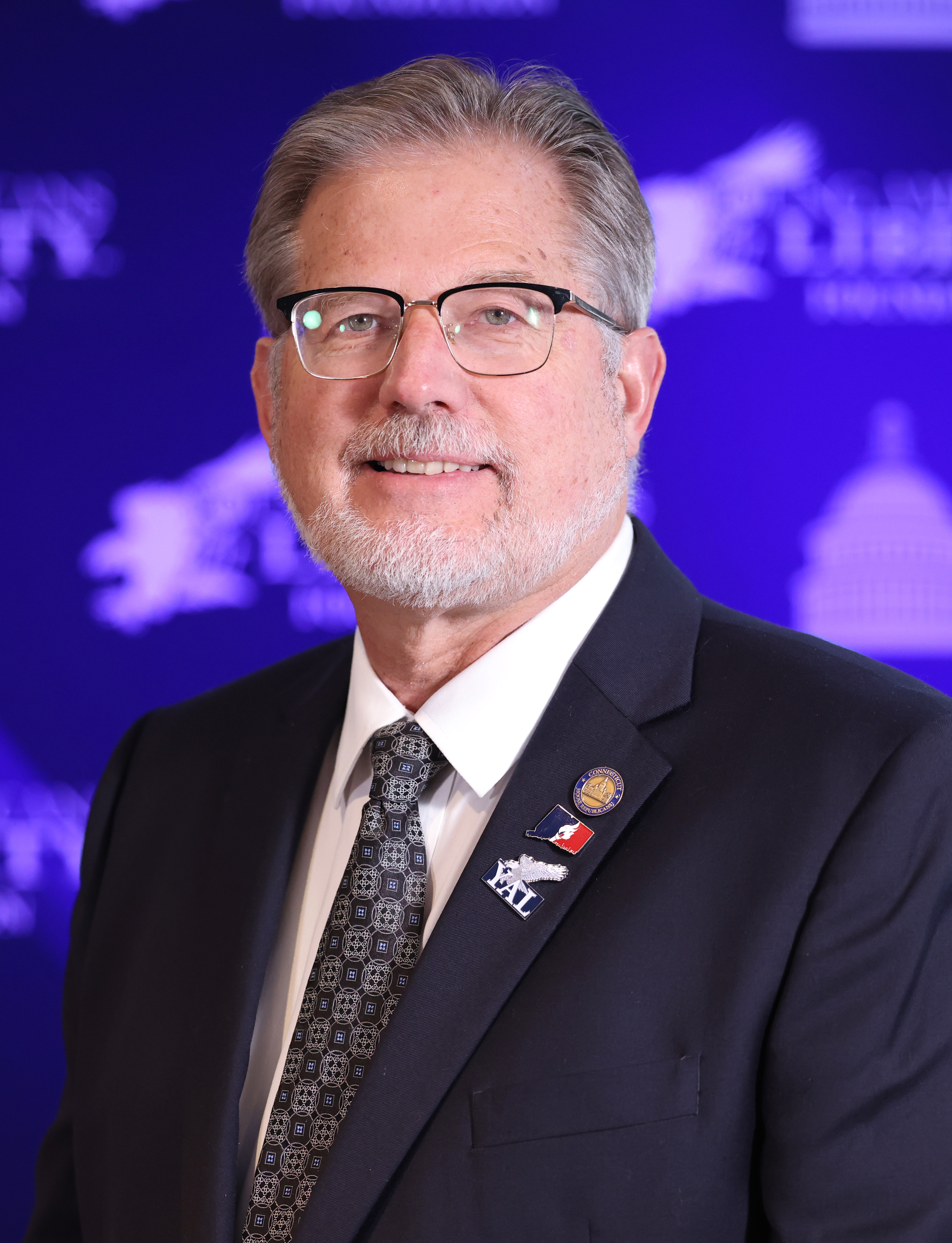
- Anderson at the 2024 Hazlitt Summit hosted by Young Americans for Liberty Foundation

Member of the Connecticut House of Representatives from the 62nd district
- Incumbent
- Assumed office January 6, 2021
- Preceded by: William Simanski
- Succeeded by: Kim Becker (elect)

Personal details
- Born: 1960 (age 65–66) Hartford, Connecticut, U.S.
- Party: Republican
- Education: Western New England University; Liberty University

Military service
- Allegiance: United States
- Branch/service: United States Army Reserve

Mark Anderson (born 1960) is an American Republican Party politician currently serving as a member of the Connecticut House of Representatives from the 62nd district, which includes the towns of Barkhamsted, Granby, Hartland, and New Hartford since 2021.

== Career ==
=== Connecticut House of Representatives ===
Anderson was first elected in 2020 after defeating Democrat Audrey Lampert. Anderson currently serves as a member of the Labor and Public Employees Committee, Veteran's Affairs Committee, and the Commerce Committee.

He was unseated by Democrat Kim Becker at the 2026 election.
