= Senator Kellogg =

Senator Kellogg may refer to:

== United States Senate members ==
- Frank B. Kellogg (1856–1937), U.S. Senator from Minnesota from 1917 to 1923.
- William Pitt Kellogg (1830–1918), U.S. Senator from Louisiana from 1868 to 1872 and from 1877 to 1883

== United States state senate members ==
- Charles Kellogg (state senator) (1839–1903), New York State Senate
- Daniel Kellogg (judge) (1791–1875), Vermont State Senate
- Ensign H. Kellogg (1812–1882), Massachusetts State Senate
- J. A. Kellogg (1871–1962), Washington State Senate
- John Azor Kellogg (1828–1883), Wisconsin State Senate
- Lewis G. Kellogg (1856–1943), Wisconsin State Senate
- Rowland C. Kellogg (1843–1911), New York State Senate
- Sanford Brown Kellogg (1822–1893), Missouri State Senate
- Stephen Wright Kellogg (1822–1904), Connecticut State Senate
