= Esperanza (New Hartford, Connecticut) =

Historic house in Connecticut, United States

- U.S. National Register of Historic Places
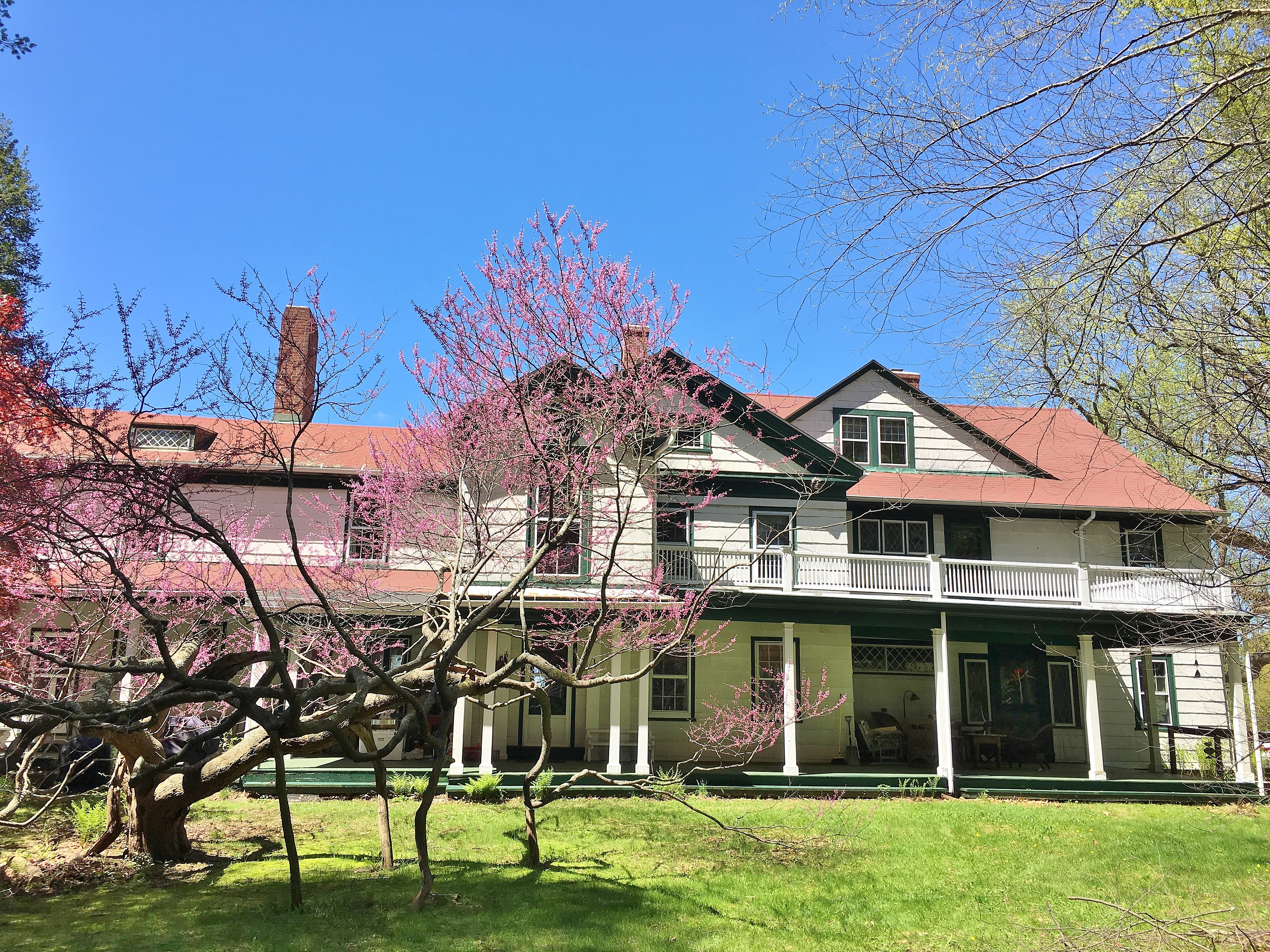

- Location within Connecticut Location within the United States
- Location: 511 Town Hill Road, New Hartford, Connecticut
- Coordinates: 41°51′23″N 73°0′6.5″W
- Area: 18 acres (7.3 ha)
- Architect: Melvin Hathaway Hapgood
- Architectural style: Colonial Revival
- NRHP reference No.: 02000334
- Added to NRHP: April 11, 2002

Esperanza is a historic country estate at 511 Town Hill Road in New Hartford, Connecticut. Built about 1835 and extensively enlarged and restyled in 1893, it is a high-quality example of Colonial Revival architecture on an original Greek Revival frame. Julie Palmer Smith (sometimes referred to as Julia Palmer Smith), one of its original owners, was a noted author of Victorian romance novels. The property was listed on the National Register of Historic Places in 2002, at which time it remained in the hands of Smith descendants.

== Description and history ==
Esperanza is located in a rural but geographically central part of New Hartford, at the northwest corner of Town Hill Road and Beeney Road. The 18-acre (7.3 ha) property is wooded in its eastern part, where its buildings are located, and is a tree-fringed cleared field to the west. The estate includes a main house and two small guest houses, a carriage house, and a summer kitchen. The main house is a somewhat rambling multigabled 2 1/2-story wood-frame structure, with porches to the east (where the main entrance is) and the west (where the fields provide a view to the hills further west). It is now predominantly Colonial Revival in style, with aspects of the Shingle style evident in some of its details. The two guest houses are vernacular single-story buildings with Colonial Revival porches.

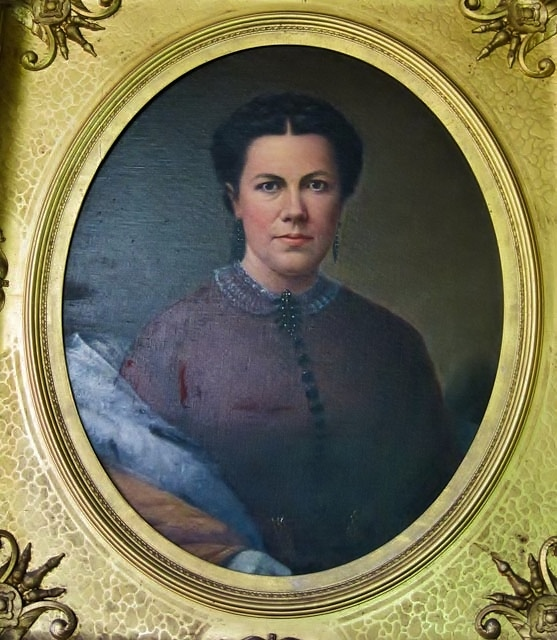
Julie Palmer Smith (1850s)

Morris and Julie Palmer Smith, residents of Hartford, first bought a prospective summer estate in New Hartford in 1871, but it burned down in November of that year. The following year they purchased the 85-acre (34 ha) farm of Frederick Lyman, which included the c. 1835 Greek Revival farmstead. This house was enlarged and restyled by Julie Smith, using the proceeds of her successful line of Victorian romance novels. In 1893 it underwent a major facelift, designed by Hartford architect Melvin H. Hapgood, at which time most of its Colonial Revival features were added. The Smiths played host to literary and artistic figures including Nathaniel Hawthorne, William Gillette, and George Inness.

== Gallery ==
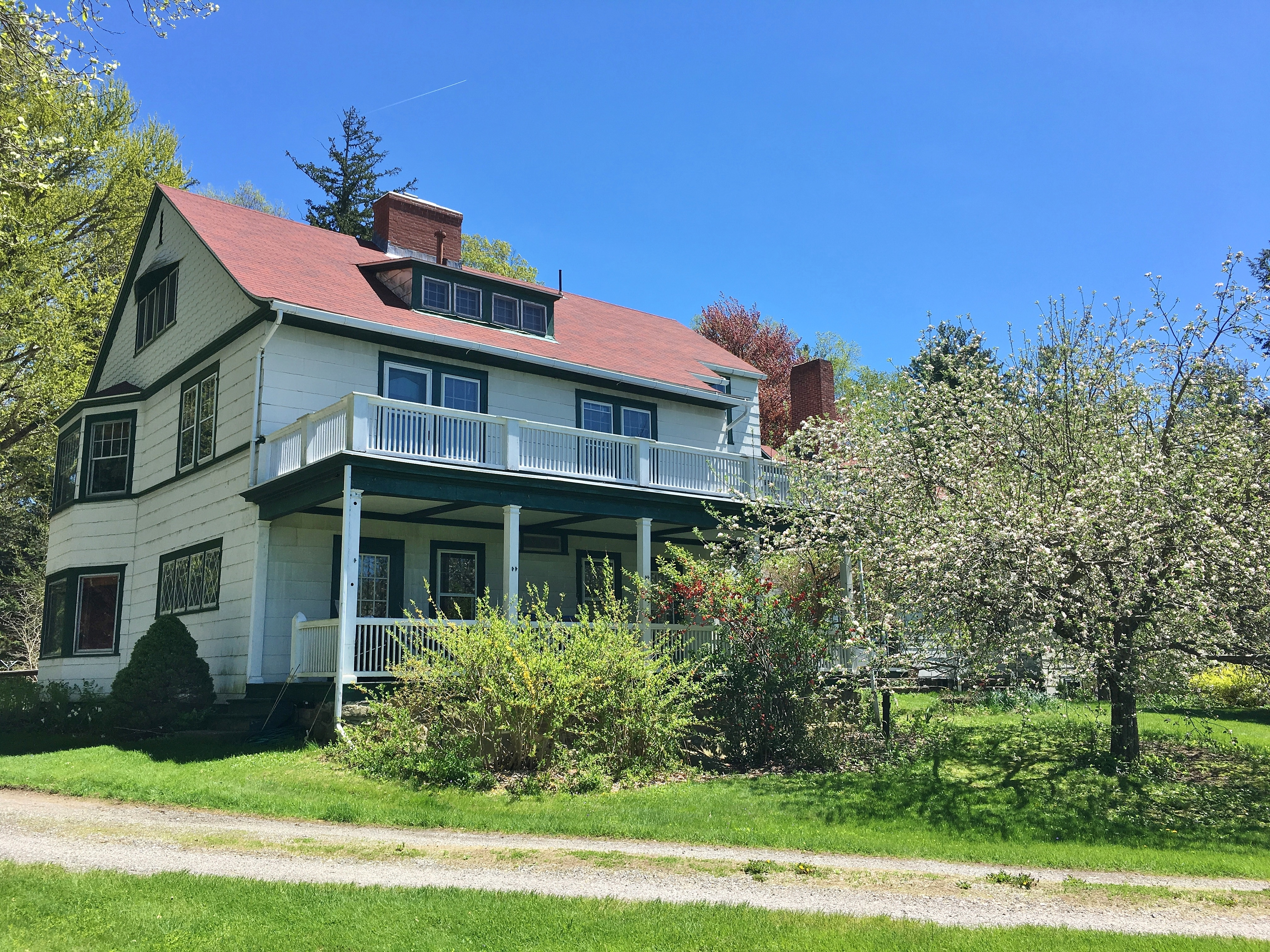
Back of the house (May 11, 2019)

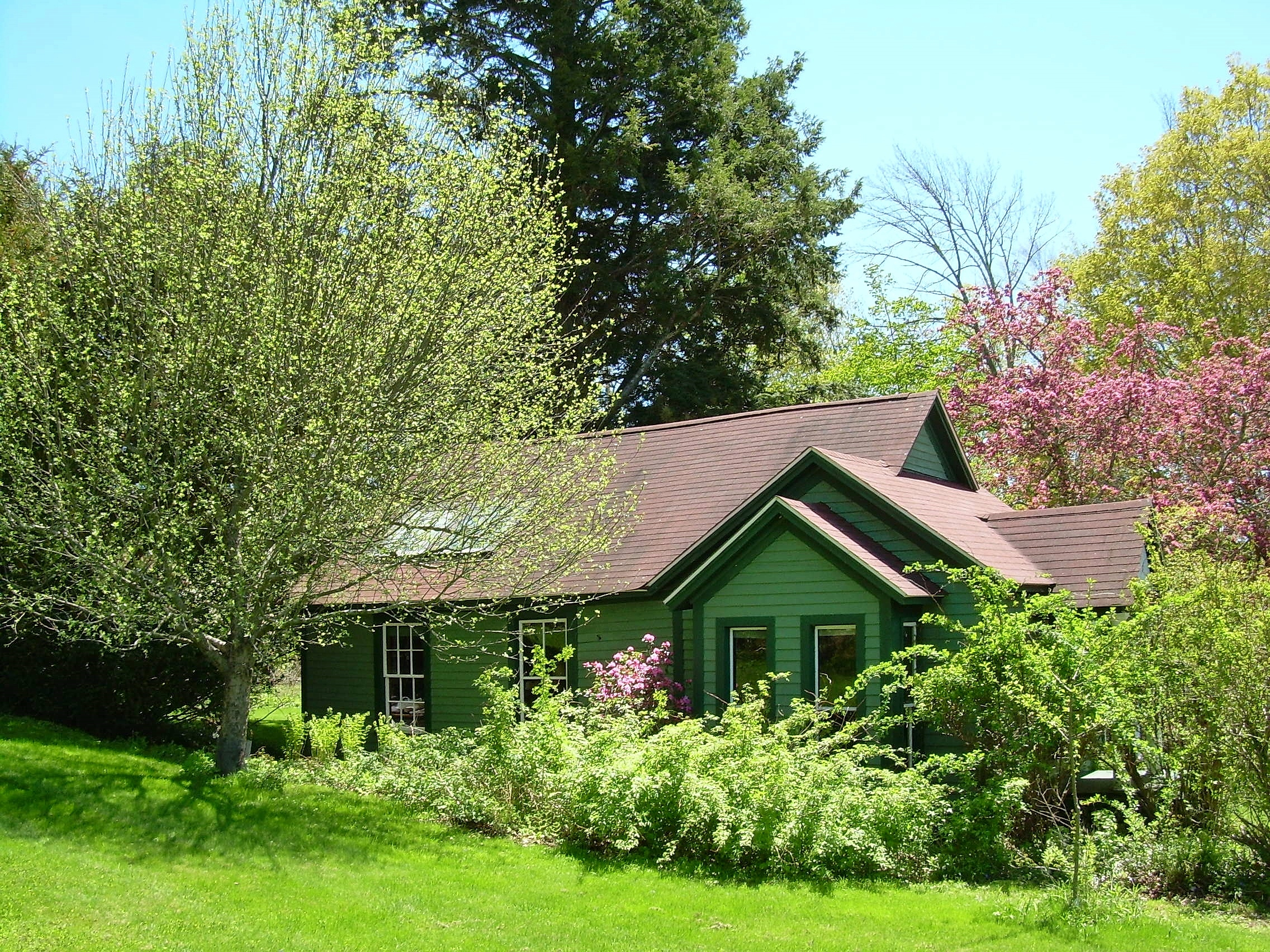
Cottage house at Esperanza estate (May 11, 2019)

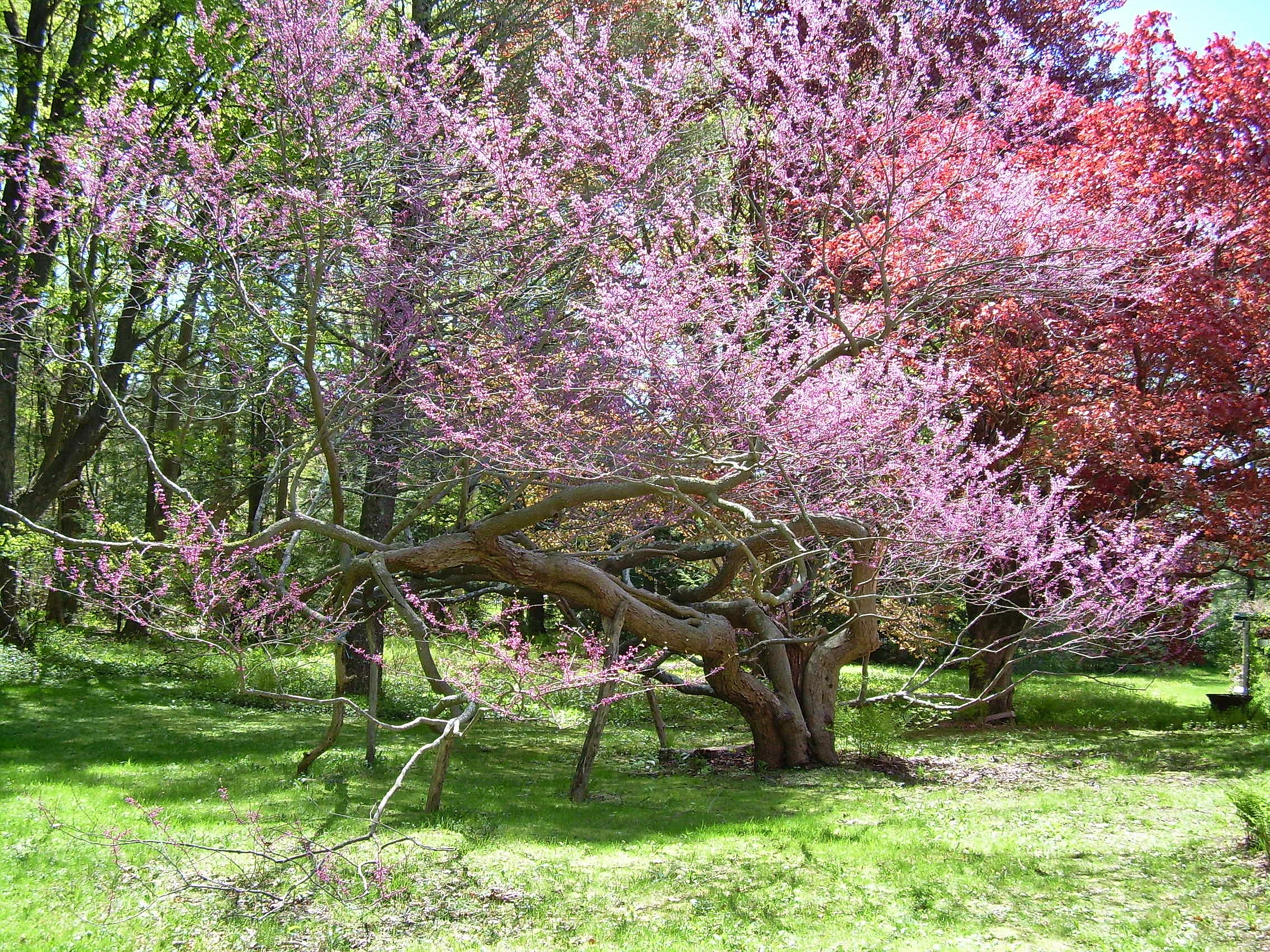
Redbud tree at Esperanza estate (May 11, 2019)

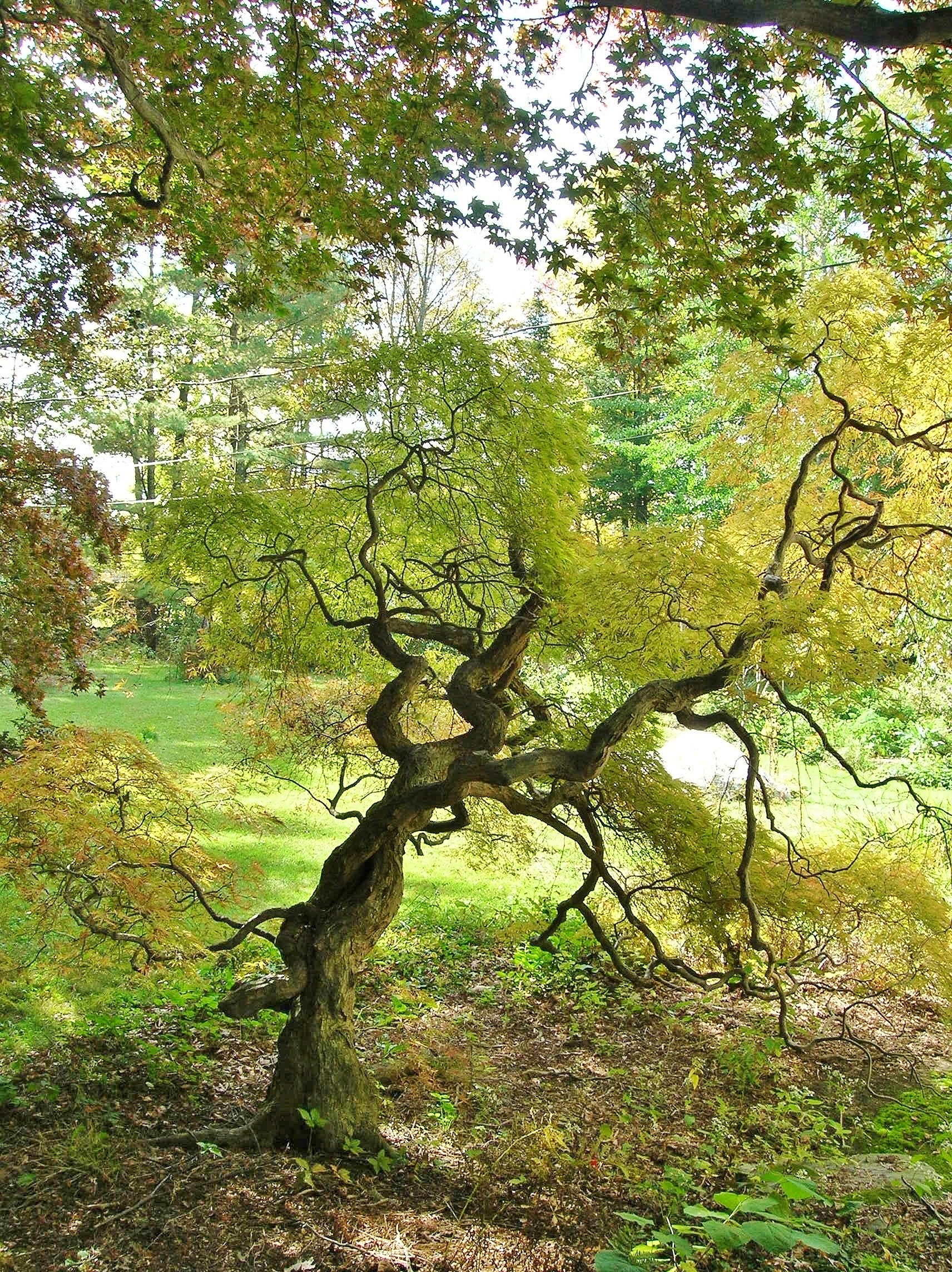
Japanese threadleaf maple tree at Esperanza estate (October 11, 2011)

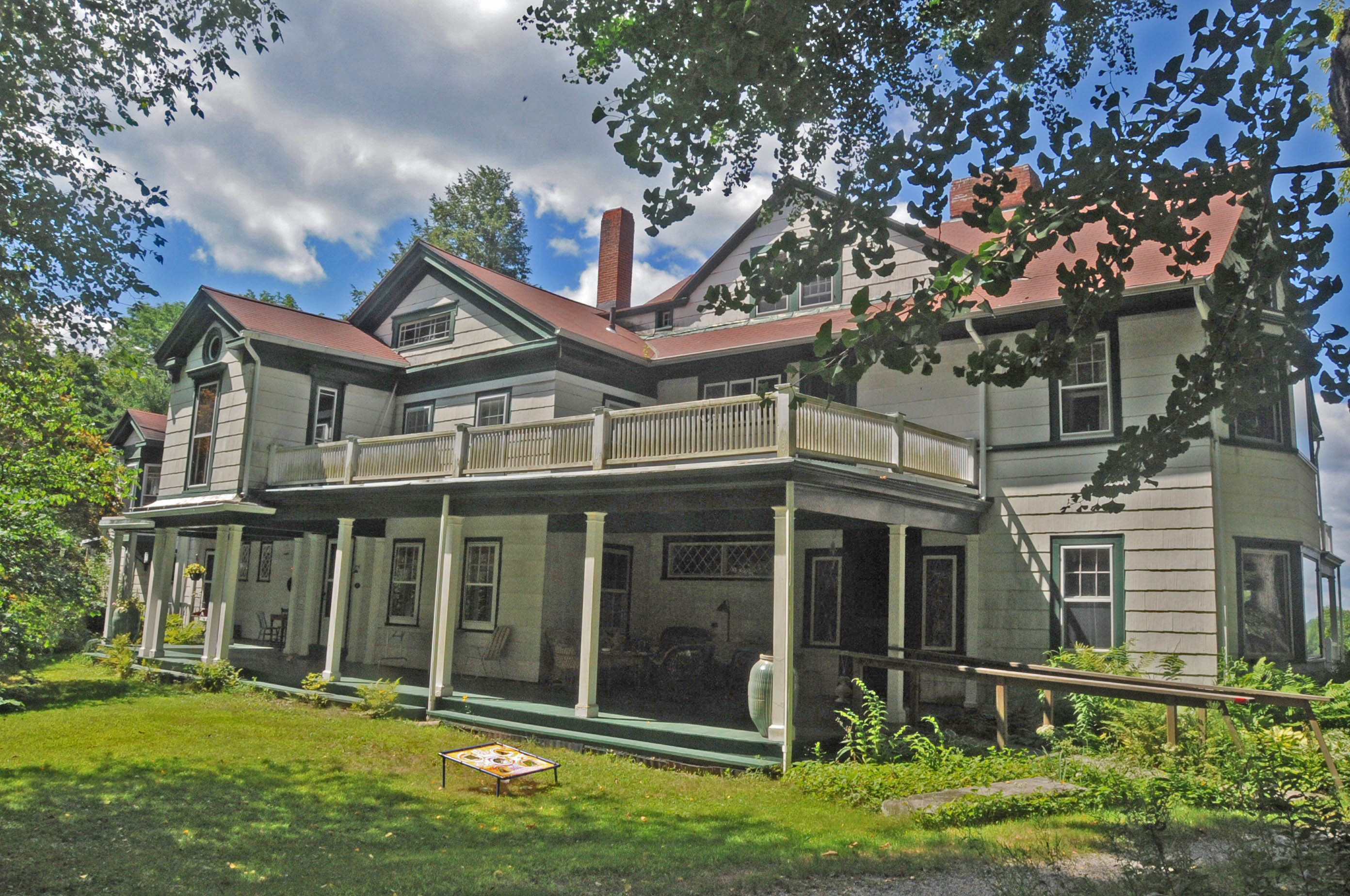
Esperanza (main house), New Hartford, CT (August 19, 2016)

== See also ==
- National Register of Historic Places listings in Litchfield County, Connecticut
