= Ski Sundown =

Ski area in New Hartford, Connecticut

Coordinates: 41.88407°N 72.94523°W

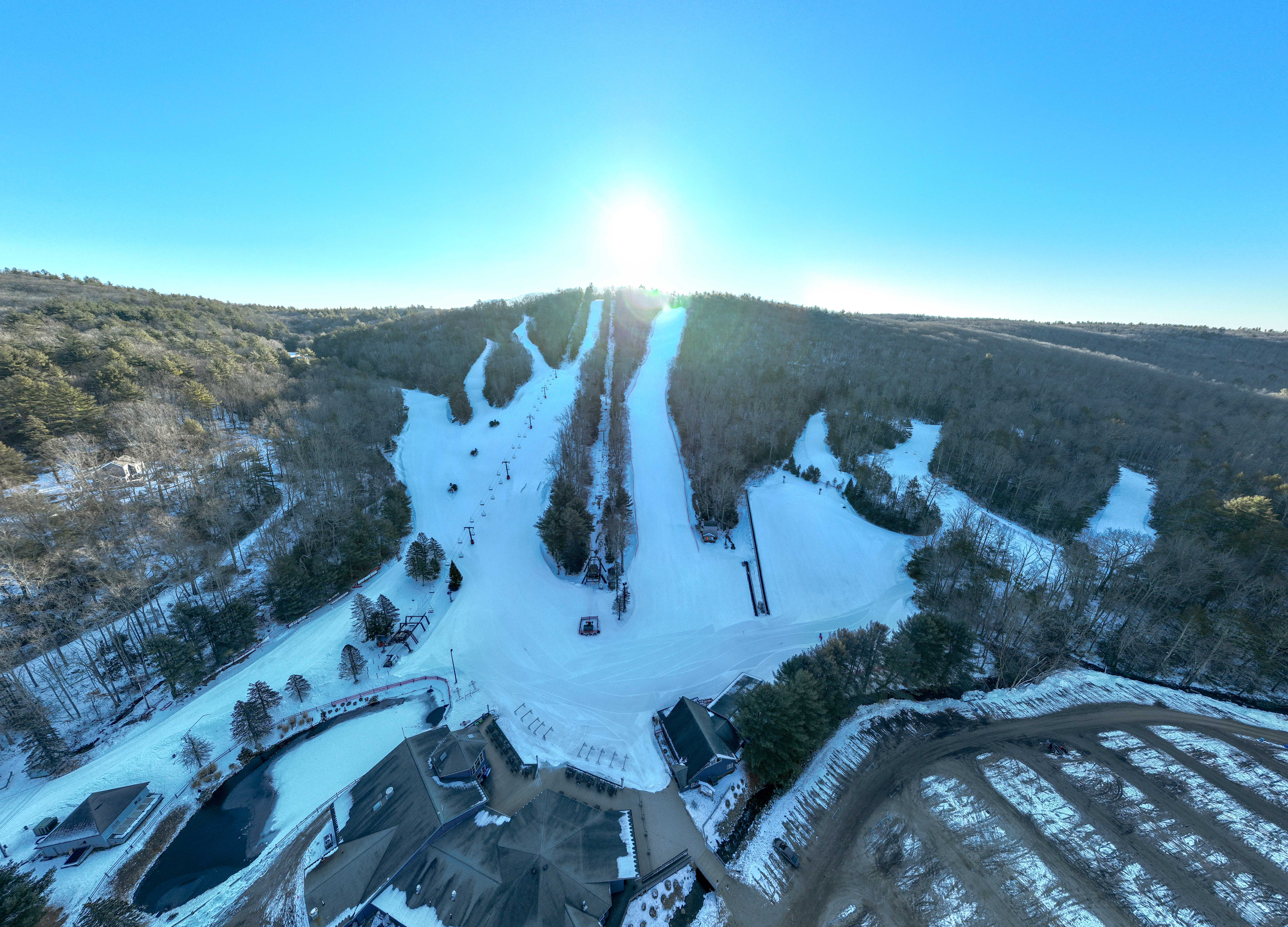
- The Ski Sundown base area
- Interactive map of Ski Sundown
- Location: New Hartford, Connecticut, US
- Nearest city: Hartford, Connecticut
- Vertical: 625 ft (191 m)
- Trails: 16
- Longest run: 1.6 km (0.99 mi)
- Lift system: 5 chairlifts: 1 Quad, 2 Triples, 2 Surface Lifts
- Snowmaking: 100%
- Website: www.skisundown.com

Ski Sundown is a ski area located in New Hartford, Connecticut. There are 17 trails, 16 of which are lighted for nighttime skiing. In terms of difficulty, nine of the trails are easier, four are intermediate and three are most difficult and one is extremely difficult. Popular trails include Tom's Treat, which winds its way down the mountain for one mile and includes a mini terrain park (1.6 km), and Gunbarrel, a steep pitch straight down the fall line which offers free NASTAR as well as CISC-sponsored races. The ski area features two terrain parks, the easier on Tom's Treat, and an expert terrain park on the black diamond run Stinger. When there is enough snow, the mountain seeds moguls on the Exhibition and Gunbarrel trails. The mountain opened its newest trail, Satan's Stairway, a double black diamond trail in the Winter 2014/2015 season. Five lifts service the mountain, with one quad, two triple chairs, and two conveyor lifts. Ski Sundown has 70 acres (280,000 m^{2}) of skiable terrain. Ski Sundown also includes 16 out of 17 trails lighted for night skiing until 10:00pm.

== History ==
Satan's Ridge Ski Area opened with a Hall T-Bar in 1963. A second T-Bar would be added in 1965. The area later closed, before being reopened as Ski Sundown by Channing Murdock, owner of nearby Butternut Basin Ski Area. In 1977, a new Borvig triple chairlift was installed to the summit, currently named the Exhibition Triple. In 1987, a second summit triple chairlift, a CTEC now referred to as the Triple Barrel, was installed, replacing an earlier double chair. In 2006 a conveyor lift called the Little Easy was added, and in 2013 a 300-foot conveyor lift was installed in the Sunnyside Learning area to replace an earlier double chair, called the Big Easy. In 2024, the Exhibition triple was removed and replaced by a Skytrac quad chair with a conveyor loading system, the first in CT.

== Mountain Statistics ==
=== Trails ===
- Ski Sundown features 17 trails spanning 70 skiable acres.

- - Easiest 53%
- - More Difficult 23%
- - Most Difficult: 18%
- - Extremely Difficult: 6%

=== Lifts ===
Quads: 1 - Ski Sundown invested in a brand new chairlift for the 2024-2025 season. They replaced their Borvig Exhibition Triple (installed in 1977) with a Skytrac Quad with synchronized conveyor. It is the first chairlift of its kind in the state of CT. This fixed-grip quad provides greater capacity, allowing 600 more passengers per hour to travel up the mountain at a faster rate of speed. The quad lift will decrease passenger ride time from 5 minutes to 4.5 minutes.

Triples: 2 - Ski Sundown features two triple chairlifts. Their Triple Barrel runs from base to summit, allowing skiers to access terrain on all levels. Their second triple, the Sunnyside Express, services three beginner and intermediate level trails in the Sunnyside learning area.

Surface Lifts: 2 - The two surface lifts at Ski Sundown, the Little Easy and Big Easy magic carpets, provide an accessible way for beginner skiers to ascend the mountain. The Little Easy carpet services a small, fenced-off beginner area located next to Gunbarrel, while the Big Easy carpet is longer and serves the entirety of the Little Joe, Breezeway, and Loop trails.

=== Terrain ===
Ski Sundown has a two terrain parks; one beginner level park on Tom's Treat and one intermediate/advanced park on Stinger. Park features change throughout the season, based on conditions and what the park crew decides to install. Features can range from small box rails to long s-rails. When there is enough snowfall, the park crew will also set up a jump located on the black diamond trail, Stinger.
