= Kim Becker =

American politician

Member-elect of the Connecticut House of Representatives from the 62nd district
- Assuming office January 2027
- Succeeding: Mark Anderson

Personal details
- Party: Democratic
- Education: Boston University; Virginia Commonwealth University
- Website: Campaign website

Kim Becker is an American politician. A member of the Democratic Party, she is the member-elect for the 62nd district of the Connecticut House of Representatives. She unseated incumbent Republican Mark Anderson at the 2026 election. She is on the Board of Selectman in Granby, Connecticut.
