= William Simanski =

American politician

Member of the Connecticut House of Representatives from the 62nd district
- In office January 5, 2011 – January 6, 2021
- Preceded by: Annie Hornish
- Succeeded by: Mark Anderson

Personal details
- Born: December 25, 1948 (age 77) Staten Island, New York, U.S.
- Party: Republican

William Simanski (born December 25, 1948) is an American politician who served in the Connecticut House of Representatives from the 62nd district from 2011 to 2021.
