= Philip Chapin House =

Historic house in Connecticut, United States

- U.S. National Register of Historic Places
- U.S. Historic district – Contributing property
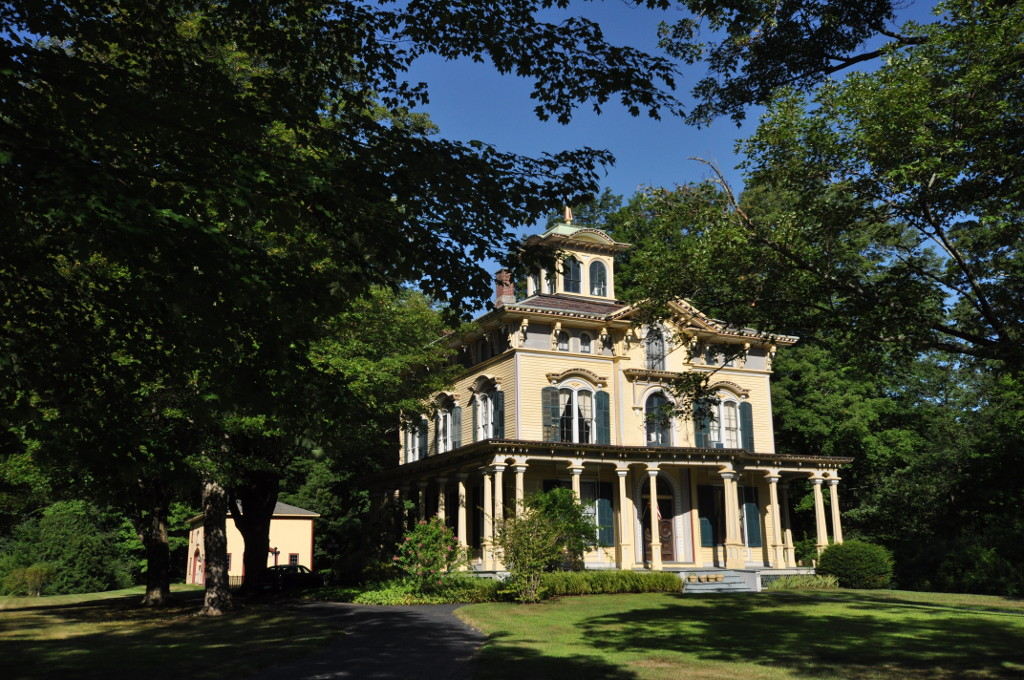

- Location within Connecticut Location within the United States
- Location: 55 Church Street, New Hartford, Connecticut
- Coordinates: 41°52′30″N 72°58′8″W
- Area: 2 acres (0.81 ha)
- Built: 1867
- Architect: Kellogg, A.G.
- Architectural style: Late 19th And 20th Century Revivals, Italian Renaissance
- Part of: Pine Meadow Historic District (ID96001463)
- NRHP reference No.: 77001399

Significant dates
- Added to NRHP: August 29, 1977
- Designated CP: December 6, 1996

The Philip Chapin House is a historic house at 55 Church Street in the Pine Meadow village of New Hartford, Connecticut. Built in 1867 for a local factory owner, it is an elaborate example of Italianate architecture. It was listed on the National Register of Historic Places in 1977.

== Description and history ==
The Philip Chapin House stands in the village of Pine Meadow, on the west side of Church Street facing Chapin Park, a triangular common bounded by Church Street and Main Street (U.S. Route 44). It is a 2 1/2-story wood-frame structure, with a truncated hip roof topped by a large rectangular belvedere. Its exterior is clad in wooden clapboards, and is elaborately decorated in the Italianate style. The roof has a deep eave supported by brackets with pendants, with a band of decorative moulded woodwork at the roof edge. Windows on the second floor are mostly set as pairs of segmented-arch sash under shared rounded hoods; the window above the main entrance is round-arch, with a bracketed cornice above. A single-story porch extends across the front and around to the left side, with equally elaborate decoration. The interior is as richly decorated as the exterior.

The house was built in 1867 for Philip Chapin, owner of a local tool factory which was one of New Hartford's largest employers. The factory had been started by his father Hermon, but was not well-run by Philip, who ended up selling out to his brother and moving away in 1878. The adjacent park was donated by Hermon, as was land for the churches that also face it.

== See also ==
- National Register of Historic Places listings in Litchfield County, Connecticut
