= Gillette's Grist Mill =

- U.S. National Register of Historic Places
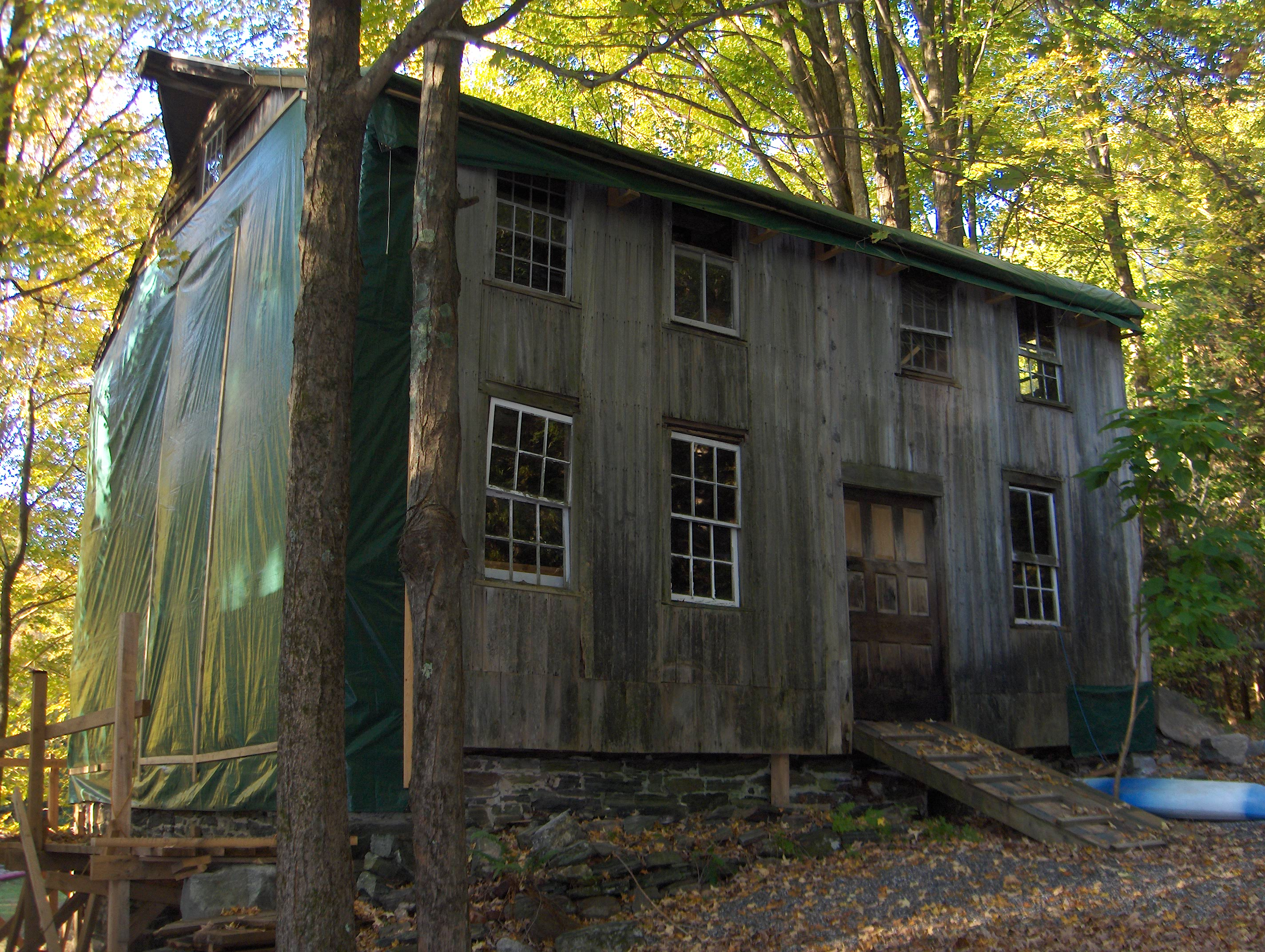

- Location within Connecticut Location within the United States
- Location: Maple Hollow Road, New Hartford, Connecticut
- Coordinates: 41°50′18″N 73°1′29″W
- Area: 3 acres (1.2 ha)
- NRHP reference No.: 77001403
- Added to NRHP: August 29, 1977

Gillette's Grist Mill is a historic grist mill on Maple Hollow Road in New Hartford, Connecticut. Probably built in the mid-19th century, it is an extremely rare example of a grist mill with a surviving water wheel. The mill property was added to the National Register of Historic Places in 1977.

== Description and history ==
Gillette's Grist Mill is located in what is now a rural area in central New Hartford. It is set on the northern bank of the Nepaug River, a short way west of where Maple Hollow Road crosses. Although the area supported more industry in the 19th century, this is the only surviving industrial building amid a cluster of houses. It is a 2 1/2-story wood-frame structure set on a high stone foundation that include a large wheel pit. It is built in a manner similar to mid-19th century barns. Elements of the power generation and transmission equipment dating to c. 1870 survive, including the water wheel and a series of iron gears that connect it to drive shafts that rotated the grindstones. Elements of the raceways delivering water to the mill survive on either side, although some have been filled in.

The history of this site for industrial use probably began in the early 19th century, when Joseph Gillette operated a series of industries on the river, including two sawmills, a gristmill, carding mill, and turning shop. The gristmill was acquired by his children in 1840, but did not thrive as grain milling operations became increasingly larger and regional, and was shut down by 1880. The technology that survives in the building appears to date to about 1870; the building's construction date is unknown, but is consistent mid-19th century construction methods.

== See also ==
- National Register of Historic Places in Litchfield County, Connecticut
