= Pine Meadow Historic District =

Historic district in Connecticut, United States

- U.S. National Register of Historic Places
- U.S. Historic district
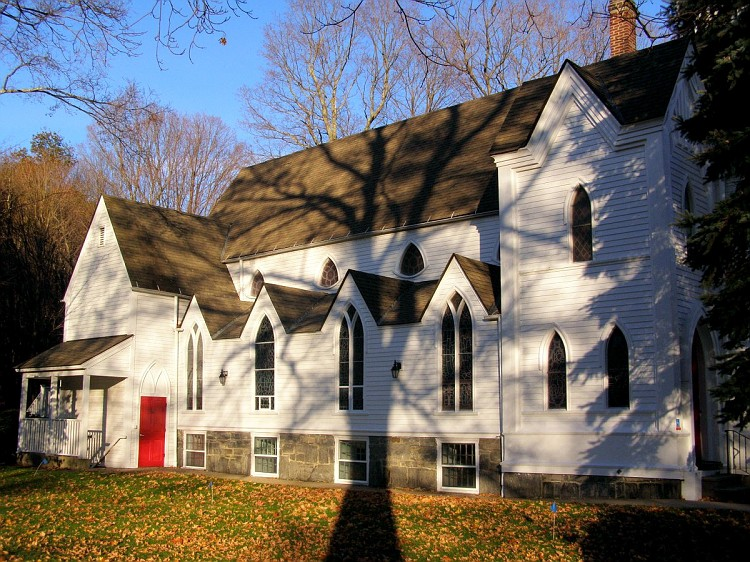
- Saint.\ John's Church

- Location within Connecticut Location within the United States
- Location: Roughly bounded by the West Branch Farmington River, Wicket, North Ten, Church and Main Streets, Village of Pine Meadow, New Hartford, Connecticut
- Coordinates: 41°52′31″N 72°58′4″W
- Area: 68 acres (28 ha)
- Architect: Kellogg, A.J.
- Architectural style: Federal, Greek Revival, Queen Anne
- NRHP reference No.: 96001463
- Added to NRHP: December 6, 1996

The Pine Meadow Historic District encompasses most of the historic 19th-century village of Pine Meadow in New Hartford, Connecticut, United States. Located at a bend in the West Branch of the Farmington River southeast of New Hartford center, it is a well-preserved example of a rural industrial village. The district was listed on the National Register of Historic Places in 1996.

== Description and history ==
The town of New Hartford was settled in the 18th century, but its principal villages developed in the 19th century around water sources that powered its industries. Pine Meadow was one of these villages, whose origins lie in the damming of the West Branch Farmington River in 1806 by Roger Sheldon. Sheldon dug a power canal across the bend in the river that forms the village's north and east bounds, that was located between what are now Wickett and Main streets. Main Street, now U.S. Route 44, was then the Albany Turnpike, and Wickett Street is named for the control structures on the canal that provided water to the various industries powered by the dam. Industrial uses included a brass foundry, textile mill, and the woodworking factory of the Chapin family, which became one of the village's dominant businesses. Most of the industrial facilities of the village have been lost, leaving a combination of worker housing and higher-quality homes of business managers and owners.

The historic district is bounded on the north and east by the West Branch Farmington River, and on the southwest by a rising ridge that roughly parallels Main Street, with a former railroad right-of-way just above its base. Because the village was at its height in the mid-19th century, most of the distinguished architecture in the village is either Greek Revival or Italianate. The most prominent house in the district is the Philip Chapin House, one of New Hartford's finest examples of Italianate architecture; it was built by one of the business owners. There are many examples of housing built for workers, ranging from small single-family houses to multi-story tenements. A focal point of the village is the triangular green formed by Main Street and Church Street, where the Chapin House and St. John's Episcopal Church, a fine example of Gothic Revival architecture, stand side by side.

== Gallery ==
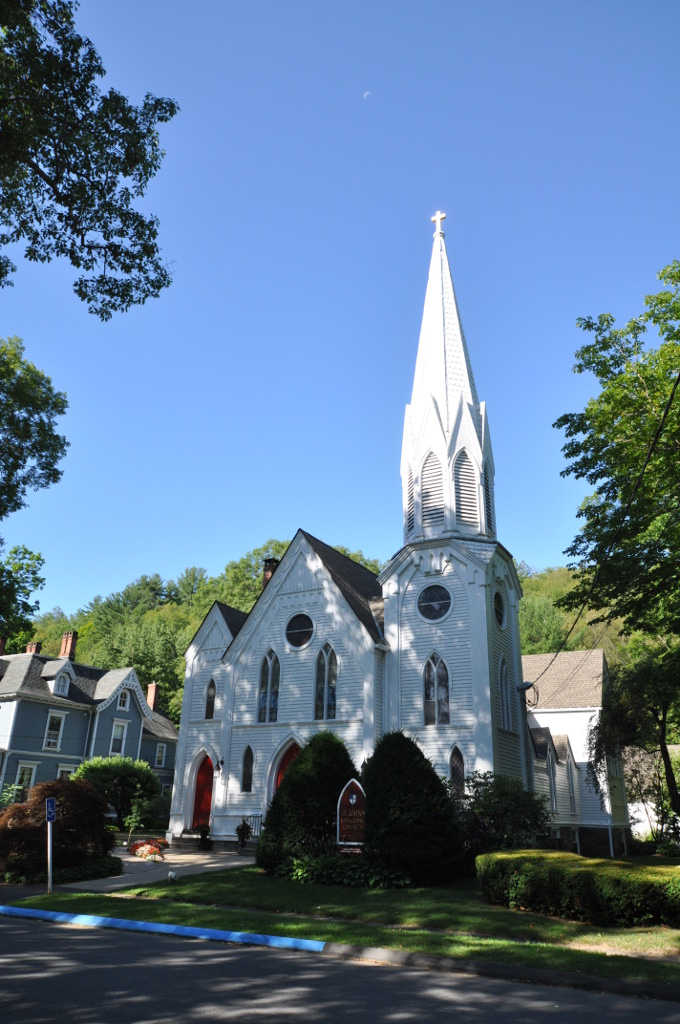

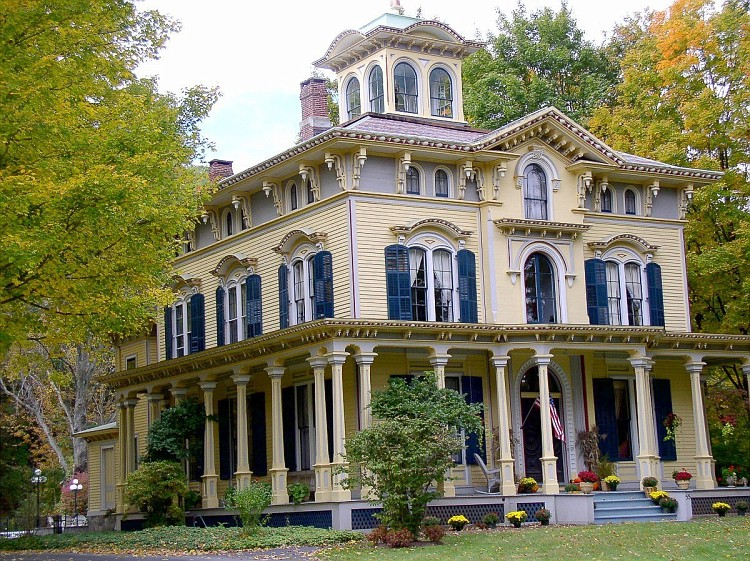
Philip Chapin House

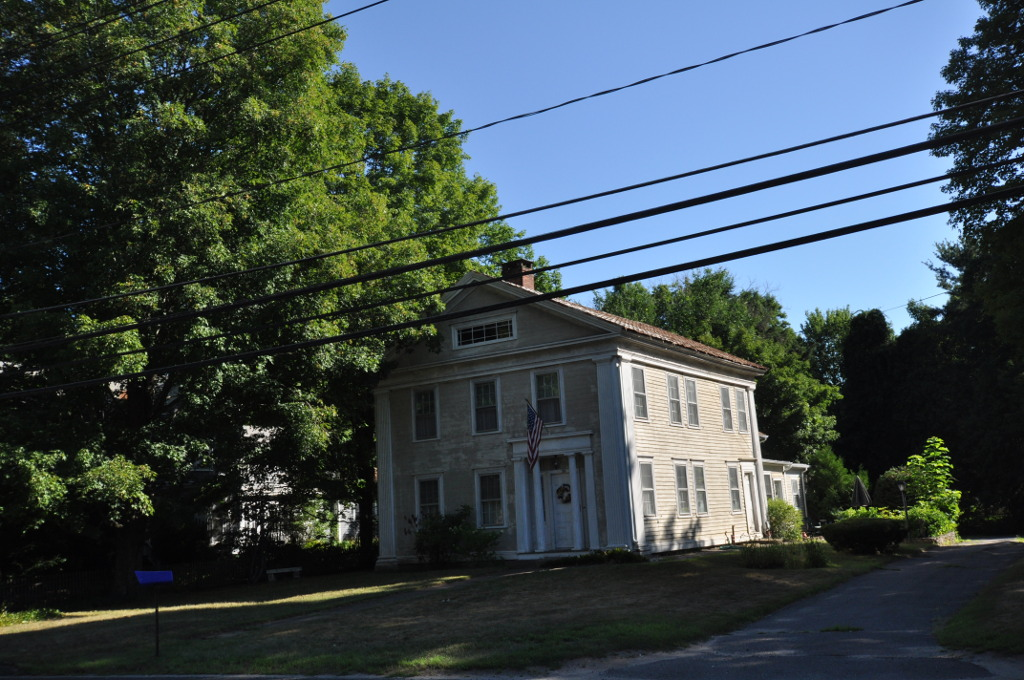

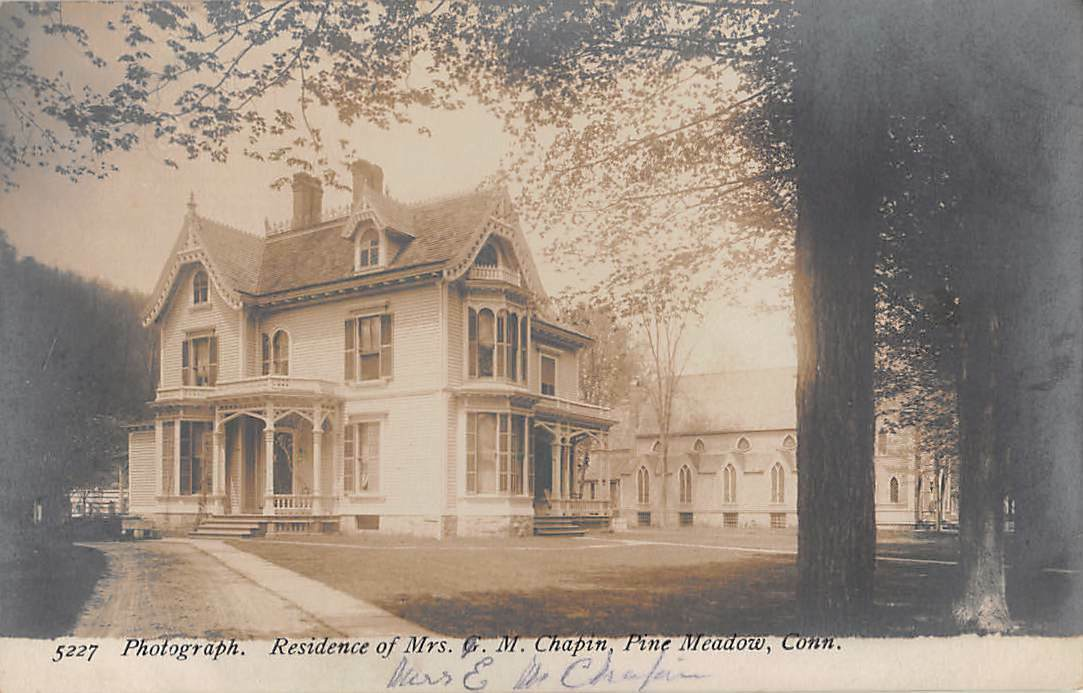

== See also ==
- National Register of Historic Places listings in Litchfield County, Connecticut
