= Otto Neumann (artist) =

German painter

Otto Neumann (14 March 1895 – 2 January 1975) was a German Expressionist painter and printmaker. His work evolved from strongly colored and thickly brushed paintings and sharp and angular black and white prints, to late abstract prints in a variety of colors. Although his style and preferred mediums both changed through a long career, the human figure remained his most enduring and constant subject.

== Early life ==
Otto Neumann was born in Heidelberg, the third child of Fritz Neumann, a professor of Romance Philology at the University of Heidelberg. Neumann grew up exposed to his father’s circle of intellectual friends. Among them were prominent professors of art, literature, and medicine including Ernst Troeltsch and Max Weber. Books were a major part of his family life, and he was to use mythology, Dante's Inferno, and more modern works as the sources for his art.

After graduating from the local Humanistic Gymnasium, the young man began to study art at the art academy in Karlsruhe. World War I interrupted his training, and he spent six months in the Rastatt Artillery before receiving a medical discharge. He briefly returned to Karlsruhe, then took private lessons from the landscape painter, Wilhelm Oertel in Mannheim before completing his training at the Academie der Bildenden Kunste in Munch in 1919. After returning to Heidelberg, he began to paint oil portraits, primarily of such major university figures as Max Weber and medical faculty members like Hans Prinzhorn. The latter was perhaps the father of art therapy, and recruited the young artist as part of a control group studying the effect of psychedelic drugs on patients.

Neumann's early years as an artist were fertile, and he produced linoleum prints of scenes from the Passion of Christ, produced both watercolor and oil still-life paintings, and made pencil and charcoal drawings after the historical artists he most admired. He also completed a series of highly detailed graphite drawings that were based on each canto of Dante’s Inferno and several of Purgatory. And though he never utilized these drawings in a published edition of the Dante epic, they became known, and admired by scholars. He also made prints of many of the Dante subjects, though almost always one of a kind, and set up his unusual lifelong practice of sometimes signing the prints but never utilizing edition numbers.

== Marriage and daughter ==
Neumann married his neighbor, Hilde Rothschild, on 15 January 1929, and their only child, Marianne, was born in November that year. The family lived in Stuttgart for the next four years and, in addition to the Dante prints, the artist continued to work in all two dimensional media, with many drawings and watercolors of his wife and daughter. They moved to a suburb of Munich in 1933, with financial help from Hilde’s family, and lived in a house with a large studio for the artist, remaining there for the rest of their lives.

The artist’s literary interests continue to be reflected, in drawings and prints based on African fairy tales, subjects from classical mythology, the Passion of Christ, and a group of fourteen linoleum prints adapted from Edvard Munch’s Alpha and Omega series. Except in the landscapes and a bit in the still life works, there is neither a background nor a ground, yet the figures seem firmly anchored in their settings. During this period, Neumann’s work begins to be recognized, and is shown in various exhibitions. He also attracted scholarly attention.

== Nazi era ==
As the Nazi regime took hold of the country, Neumann’s work was considered degenerate and his refusal to divorce his Jewish wife to further his career set him aside from many of his friends who compromised their work and their associations. Deprived of a market for his work, and with Hilde’s family having left the country and no longer able to help, the artist worked as a technical illustrator of anatomical drawings for the Medical School in Munich, and when the school was destroyed, he was able to work on such drawings in his own studio. The Neumanns took in the contemporary writer Werner Bergengruen and his family when their home was bombed, and the artist made portraits of the family in addition to paintings and drawings based on his friend’s novels.

== Postwar years ==
After the war, Neumann never returned to oils or watercolors, though he did do a number of works in colored chalks and pastels, through the mid-1950s. Otherwise, he spent the rest of his long career creating drawings and various kinds of prints, with many in the late forties and through the 1950s based on such subjects from classical mythology as Perseus, Mercury and Argos, centaurs in battle and at rest, and several scenes from the saga of Odysseus. One or two figures tend to predominate, though there are often frieze-like arrangements of forms along the picture plane of the sheet of paper. Tragedy struck when Marianne committed suicide, increasing Neumann’s already pessimistic outlook on the world, but he continued to produce art despite his mental health.

By the mid-1950s, monotypes began to predominate in his oeuvre, mostly created on sheets of glass and increasingly abstractions of the human figure. The overt literary based subjects, and the more personal grotesques and composites of forms were replaced by simplified, though often interlocking forms, usually on a flat background. Hilde seems to have coped with their daughter’s death by returning to the weaving of her early years, and produced large woolen tapestries that exactly duplicated the form of individual Neumann prints. The artist also starts to give individual instruction to a number of students, and began to exhibit with groups of mostly younger artists. He also had work included in several small German literary magazines, which showcased the work of young poets and writers, and he clearly identified with the younger generation as his work grew more abstract.

Still depressed and relying too much on medication for both physical pain and depression, the artist admitted himself to a homeopathic sanitarium in 1960 producing very small monotypes while there. After his release, he continued to take homeopathic medications and did exercise. His work got additional attention during the 1960s, and though he never made the journey, there were shows in the United States.

When Hilde died in 1970, the artist had a burst of work and then stopped toward the end of 1971. Sales and proposals for exhibitions came from several countries, but he had lost interest in promoting the work. He remained at home and died on 2 January 1975 after suffering a fatal heart attack. Several small exhibitions were mounted after his death, with a full retrospective appearing at the Heidelberger Kunstverein in 1982. Other exhibitions were in Stuttgart, and several in the United States, with the cooperation of Hilde’s family who inherited the estate.

== Major work ==
Following the path of many artists, Neumann was usually only interested in his recent work, and would have destroyed much of his early production, had his wife not interfered and stored them in the studio. When friends and family came to see him from elsewhere, they never even saw the earlier work. Yet, many scholars and members of the artistic community regarded the Dante pieces, the early grotesques, and the oil portraits highly. Later, after the war, and increasingly through the 1960s, younger artists identified with the late works that were so abstracted from nature that the viewer with no knowledge of the trajectory of Neumann’s career might simply have identified them as non-objective.

Whatever the vagaries of taste, the early oil portraits like the self-portrait, that of Max Weber, and others, along with the Passion prints, the grotesque prints and drawings, and the Dante drawings are the prime examples of his early career The work of the immediate post-war years include the mythological figures and wonderful curvaceous horses and riders, while the solemn and totemic late abstracts in various colors show the extreme to which he took his work on the human figure.
