= Annie Hornish =

American politician

Member of the Connecticut House of Representatives from the 62nd district
- In office January 7, 2009 – January 5, 2011
- Preceded by: Richard F. Ferrari
- Succeeded by: William Simanski

Personal details
- Born: May 9, 1966 (age 60)
- Party: Democratic

Annie Hornish (born May 9, 1966) is an American politician who served in the Connecticut House of Representatives from the 62nd district from 2009 to 2011.

== Fatal dog mauling ==
On November 6, 2019, a 95-year-old woman named Janet D'Aleo was fatally mauled by a dog at the Hornishes' home in Connecticut. The dog was a 4-year-old male pit bull/pointer mix belonging to Annie and her husband, Neil Hornish. D'Aleo was visiting Hornish's mother at the home when the dog bit her on her lower extremities, causing "substantial and severe injuries," Chief Richard Brown said.

Hornish made the following statement: "It seems as if the dog got excited and it was overexuberant...[The dog] jumped on a friend with a walker and she fell backward and we believe that's what killed her."

The dog that fatally mauled D'Aleo was quarantined and is scheduled to be euthanised. The Hornishes have appealed the dog's destruction.

=== Legal action ===
In November 2019, a dog owned by Annie Hornish and her husband, Neil Hornish, was involved in a fatal incident at their Suffield, Connecticut, home, resulting in the death of 95-year-old Janet D’Aleo. The dog, a pit bull-pointer mix named Dexter, was ordered to be euthanized by the town's animal control officer. The Hornishes appealed the order, initiating a prolonged legal battle.

The Connecticut Department of Agriculture upheld the euthanasia order in December 2020, concluding that Dexter posed a risk to public safety. The Hornishes subsequently appealed to the Superior Court, which also ruled in favor of euthanasia in November 2023. As of May 2025, the case is pending before the Connecticut Appellate Court.

In addition to the euthanasia proceedings, the Hornishes filed a lawsuit against the Town of Suffield and River Valley Animal Center in March 2022, alleging excessive and arbitrary kennel fees for Dexter's confinement. The town counterclaimed to recover unpaid boarding fees. In May 2023, the Superior Court ruled that the Hornishes were responsible for the kennel costs.

In May 2025, the court ordered the Hornishes to pay over $76,000 in unpaid kennel fees, plus 7.5% annual interest. The Hornishes have expressed their intention to appeal this decision, arguing that the financial burden could deter rightful legal appeals.

Throughout the litigation, the Hornishes have maintained that Dexter was not inherently dangerous and that the incident was provoked. They have proposed settlement offers to spare Dexter's life, but the town has rejected these, citing public safety concerns.

In addition to their legal battles with the Town of Suffield the Hornishes faced a wrongful death lawsuit from D'Aleo's family, alleging D'Aleo suffered "significant bite wounds and lacerations to her lower extremities, resulting in flesh, muscle and tendon loss; injuries to the nerves, muscles, and soft tissues of her body; and a shock to her entire system." In January 2021, a settlement was agreed upon wherein the Hornishes must pay $2 million to Janet D'Aleo's estate.
