= Sanford Brown Kellogg =

American lawyer and politician

Sanford Brown Kellogg (April 13, 1822 – April 14, 1893) was an American lawyer and politician.

Kellogg, third son of George C. and Clarissa (Brown) Kellogg, was born in New Hartford, Litchfield County, Connecticut, on April 13, 1822. He graduated from Yale College in 1843. He was admitted to the bar in New Haven, after three years of legal study, the last year being spent at the Yale Law School. He began the practice of law in St. Louis, Mo., in partnership with Samuel Knox, in October, 1846. He was liberal and public spirited, and actively interested in founding and sustaining religious and educational institutions in Illinois and Missouri. He was a member of the Missouri Senate, in 1862-63. He died April 14, 1893, after a brief illness, at the age of 71.

He was married on August 2, 1855, to Maria Louise, only daughter of the Rev. James Kimball, of Oakham, Mass. Their daughter was a missionary in China. He was again married on December 14, 1870, to Louise Parker, daughter of the Hon. James Allen, of Oakham, Mass., who survived him. Their daughter was a member of the class of 1894, Wellesley College, and their son was a member of the class of 1895, Yale College.
