= New Hartford, Connecticut =

- Town
- Town of New Hartford
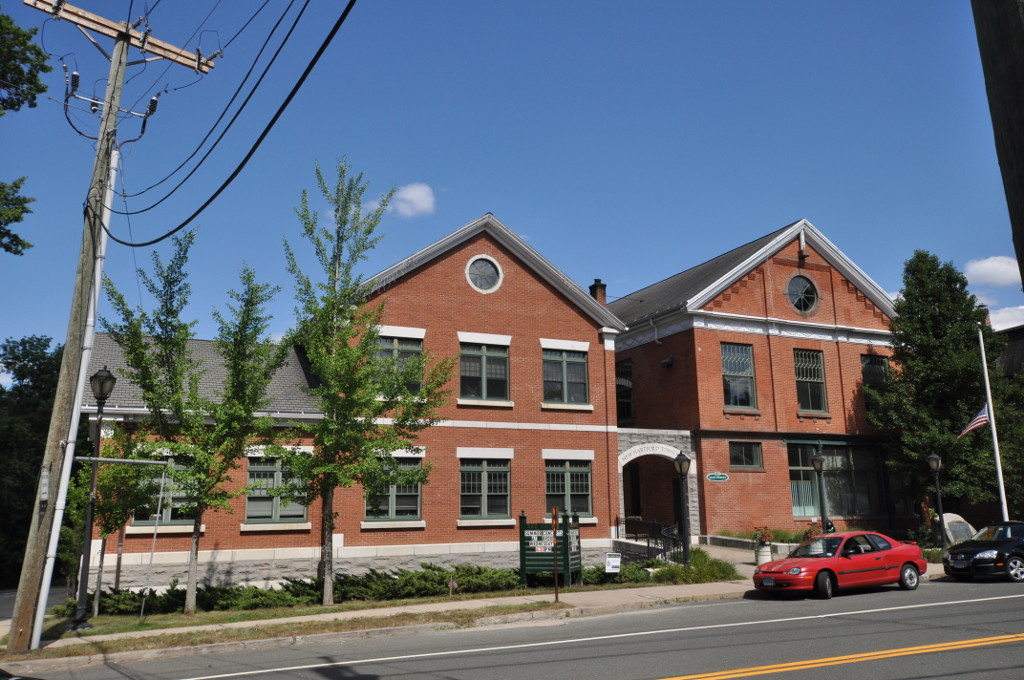
- New Hartford Town Hall

- Seal

- Coordinates: 41°50′29″N 73°00′15″W
- Country: United States
- U.S. state: Connecticut
- County: Litchfield
- Region: Northwest Hills
- Incorporated: 1738

Government
  - Type: Selectman-town meeting
  - First selectman: Daniel V. Jerram (R)
  - Selectman: Alesia R. Kennerson (R)
  - Selectman: Laura Garay (D)

Area
  - Total: 38.2 sq mi (98.9 km^{2})
  - Land: 37.0 sq mi (95.9 km^{2})
  - Water: 1.1 sq mi (2.9 km^{2})
- Elevation: 873 ft (266 m)

Population (2020)
  - Total: 6,658
  - Density: 180/sq mi (69.4/km^{2})
- Time zone: UTC-5 (Eastern)
  - Summer (DST): UTC-4 (Eastern)
- ZIP code: 06057
- Area codes: 860/959
- FIPS code: 09-51350
- GNIS feature ID: 0213470
- Website: newhartfordct.gov

New Hartford is a town in Litchfield County, Connecticut, United States. The population was 6,658 at the 2020 census. The town is part of the Northwest Hills Planning Region. The town center is defined by the U.S. Census Bureau as the New Hartford Center census-designated place (CDP). The town is mainly a rural community consisting of farms, homes, and parks. Brodie Park and Ski Sundown are located in New Hartford.

== Geography ==
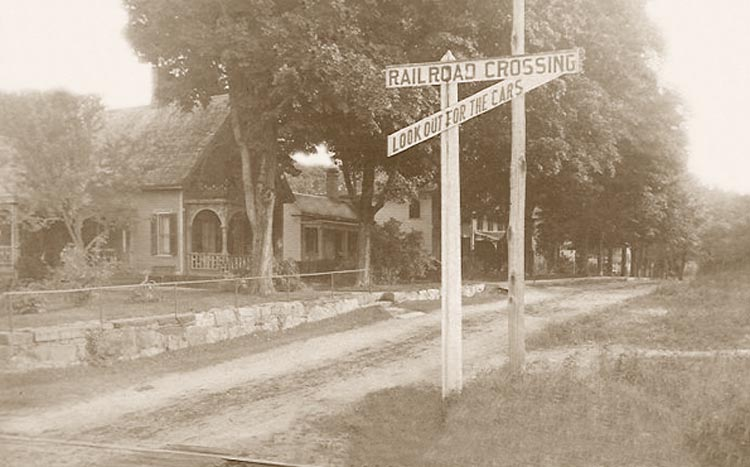
"Central Avenue, New Hartford", a 1910 postcard

New Hartford is in eastern Litchfield County and is bordered by the city of Torrington to the west and Hartford County to the east and south. It is 19 miles (31 km) northwest of Hartford, the state capital. According to the United States Census Bureau, New Hartford has a total area of 38.2 square miles (98.9 km^{2}), of which 37.0 square miles (95.9 km^{2}) are land and 1.1 square miles (2.9 km^{2}), or 2.97%, are water. The CDP has a total area of 3.4 square miles (8.8 km^{2}), of which 6.09% is water.

=== Principal communities ===
- Bakerville
- Nepaug
- New Hartford Center
- Pine Meadow (has its own post office)

== Demographics ==
Historical population
Census	Pop.	Note	%±
1820	1,685		—
1850	2,643		—
1860	2,758		4.4%
1870	3,078		11.6%
1880	3,302		7.3%
1890	3,160		−4.3%
1900	3,424		8.4%
1910	2,144		−37.4%
1920	1,781		−16.9%
1930	1,834		3.0%
1940	1,836		0.1%
1950	2,395		30.4%
1960	3,033		26.6%
1970	3,970		30.9%
1980	4,884		23.0%
1990	5,769		18.1%
2000	6,088		5.5%
2010	6,970		14.5%
2020	6,658		−4.5%
U.S. Decennial Census

As of the census of 2000, there were 6,088 people, 2,228 households, and 1,748 families residing in the town. The population density was 164.4 inhabitants per square mile (63.5/km^{2}). There were 2,368 housing units at an average density of 64.0 per square mile (24.7/km^{2}). The racial makeup of the town was 97.67% White, 0.64% African American, 0.05% Native American, 0.74% Asian, 0.07% Pacific Islander, 0.20% from other races, and 0.64% from two or more races. Hispanic or Latino of any race were 1.35% of the population.

There were 2,228 households, out of which 38.3% had children under the age of 18 living with them, 68.9% were married couples living together, 6.6% had a female householder with no husband present, and 21.5% were non-families. 16.4% of all households were made up of individuals, and 4.7% had someone living alone who was 65 years of age or older. The average household size was 2.72 and the average family size was 3.07.

In the town, the population was spread out, with 26.9% under the age of 18, 4.4% from 18 to 24, 31.0% from 25 to 44, 28.7% from 45 to 64, and 8.9% who were 65 years of age or older. The median age was 39 years. For every 100 females, there were 100.1 males. For every 100 females age 18 and over, there were 97.6 males.

The median income for a household in the town was $69,321, and the median income for a family was $78,065. Males had a median income of $52,077 versus $36,946 for females. The per capita income for the town was $30,429. About 1.5% of families and 1.6% of the population were below the poverty line, including none of those under age 18 and 3.1% of those age 65 or over.

== Education ==
The town of New Hartford has three elementary schools, New Hartford Elementary and Bakerville School have grades Kindergarten through Second Grade. The New Hartford Elementary School includes preschool classes, with most children, attending whichever school they're closest to. All children from grades three through six attend the Ann Antolini School. These schools are administered by the New Hartford Board of Education.

Resident middle and high school students attend Northwestern Regional Middle School and Northwestern Regional High School.

== Community and recreation ==
New Hartford is home to Ski Sundown, a locally popular ski mountain that attracts many skiers and snowboarders in Litchfield County. It hosts several Slopestyle Competitions and winter events every year. Many other community events are held at Brodie Park, which lies on the edge of West Hill Lake, where a small beach and swimming area is welcome for New Hartford Residents. Several of the events held at Brodie Park are The Race Around The Lake, on Memorial Day weekend, several camps and concerts during the summer, a community picnic in July, and an annual children's Christmas Party held in Berkshire Hall. All other events are held in New Hartford Center, primarily the annual Light New Hartford held in early December. New Hartford is the largest town in the local area and therefore has many of the regional sports teams. Most games for baseball, softball, soccer and football are held at Brown's Corner, which is off Route 202.

== Places of worship ==
There are six churches in New Hartford: two Congregational churches (the oldest church in the town, at New Hartford Center, and another in the village of Nepaug), an Episcopal church (at Pine Meadow), Saint Paul's Lutheran Church, a Methodist church (in the village of Bakerville), a Baptist church (Harvest Baptist) and Immaculate Conception Roman Catholic Church. There is also a Buddhist temple, at Bakerville.

== Transportation ==
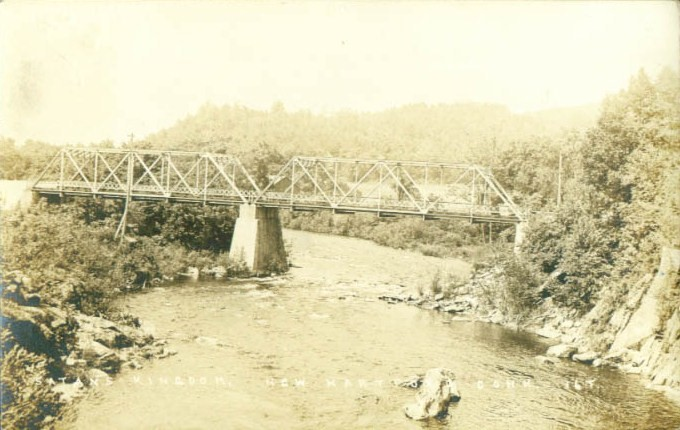
Girder bridge, "Satan's Kingdom", c. 1910s

The town's main thoroughfares are U.S. Route 202 and U.S. Route 44. US 202 leads west to Torrington and east to Avon, while US 44 leads northwest to Winsted and southeast to Hartford. Connecticut Route 219 has its southern terminus at US 202 between Bakerville and Nepaug, and leads north through New Hartford Center into Barkhamsted.

Being a primarily rural town, New Hartford does not have any public transit services.

== On the National Register of Historic Places ==
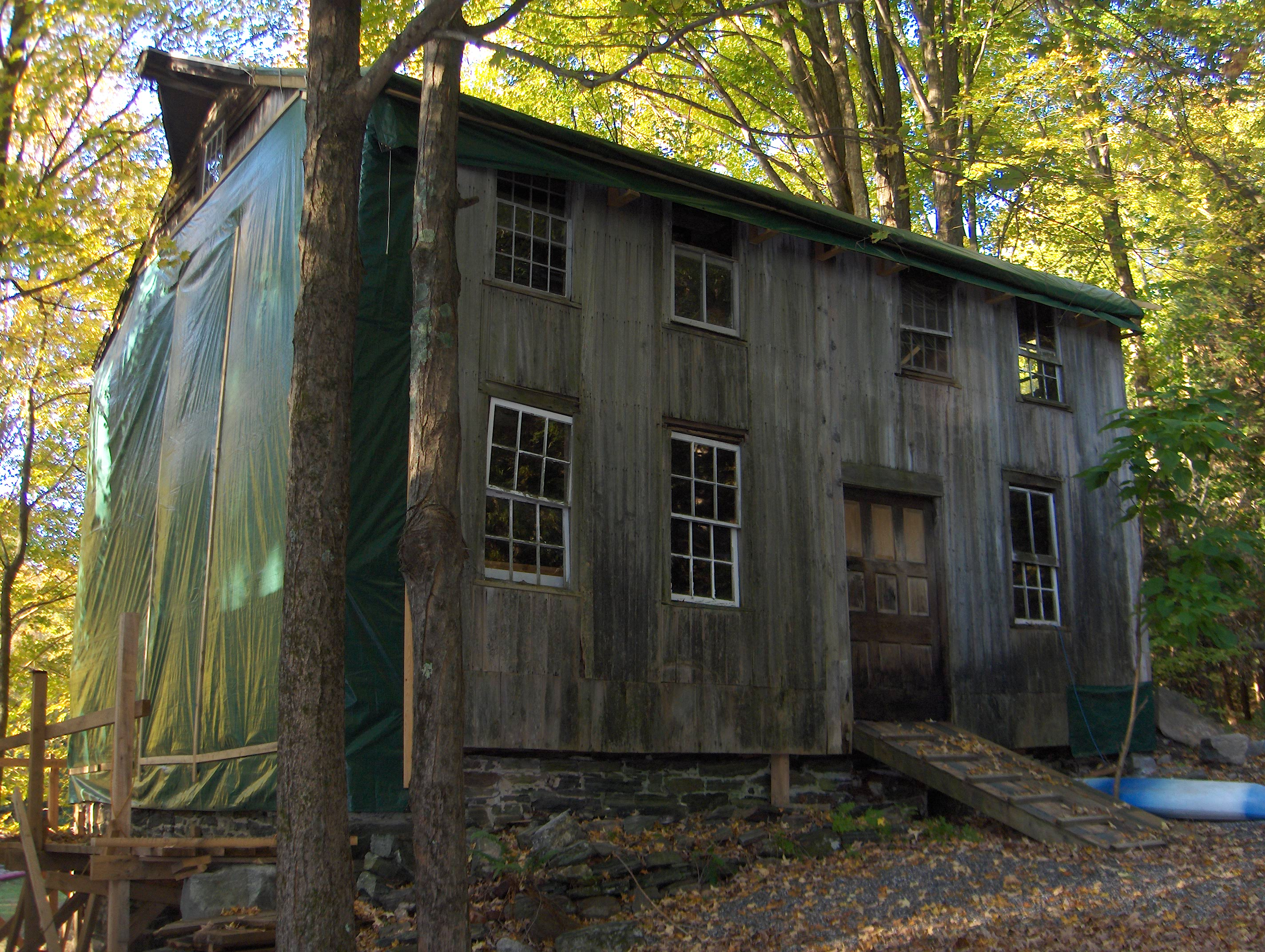
Gillette's Grist Mill

- Philip Chapin House – 55 Church Street—An Italian Renaissance house built in 1867
- Esperanza – 511 Town Hill Road—A country estate, first built in a Greek Revival style in 1835, then expanded in a Colonial revival style between 1874 and 1893
- Pine Meadow Historic District – A collection of mid to late 18th-century houses built in the Pine Meadow area
- Sun Terrace – Route 219—A country house built in the International style, first completed in 1932.
- Gillette's Grist Mill – Maple Hollow Road—a 19th-century gristmill on the Nepaug River

== Notable locations ==
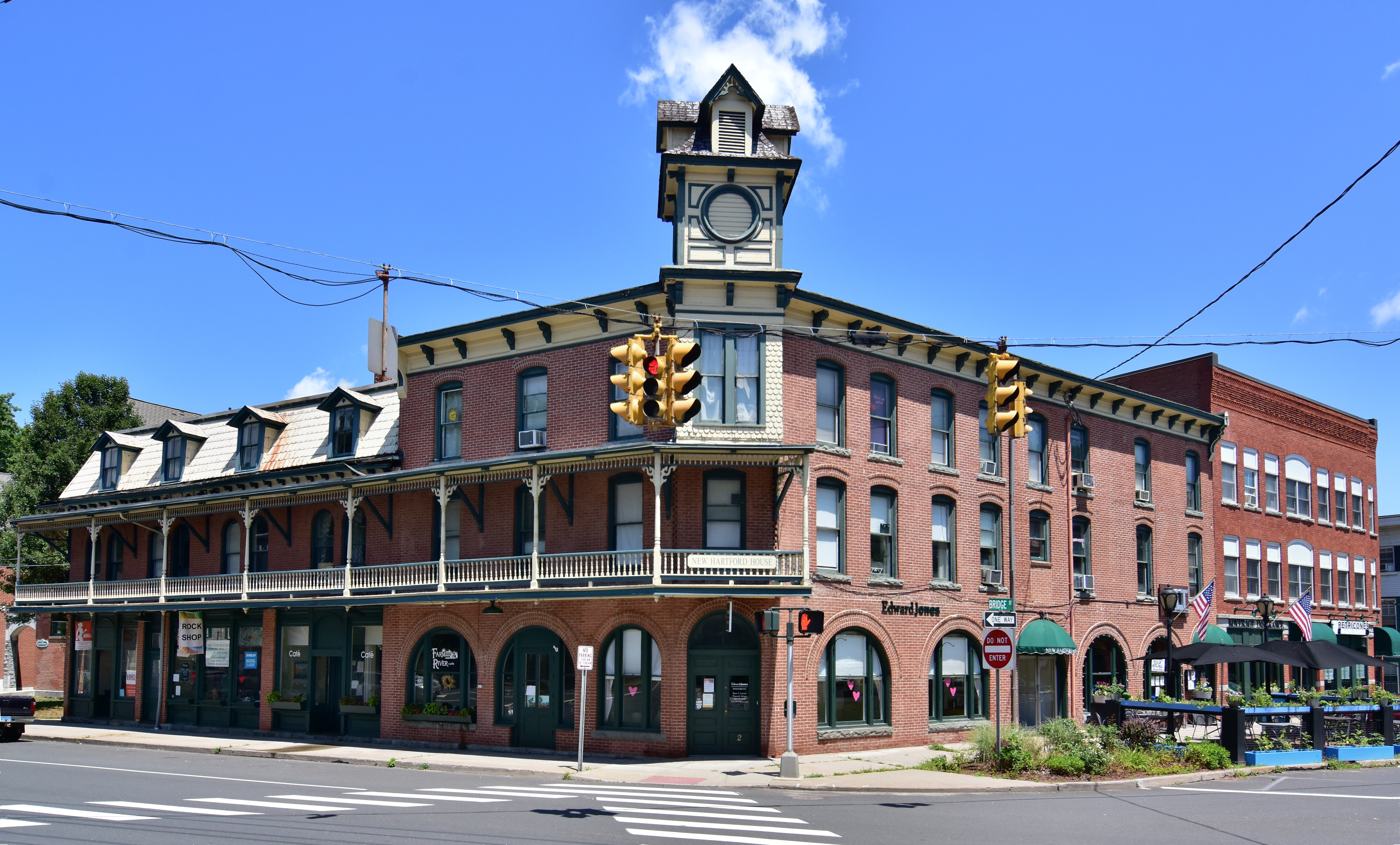
New Hartford House, built in 1888. The building was destroyed in 2021 by a fire.

- Ski Sundown – a ski resort
- Hurley Business Park, originally home to textile manufacturer Greenwoods Company, later Underwood Typewriters, and perhaps its most well-known occupant, Ovation Guitar Company

== Notable people ==
- Marcus H. Holcomb, 66th Governor of Connecticut
- Sanford Brown Kellogg, Missouri senator
- Annmarie Tuxbury, distance runner
