= Otto C. Neumann =

American politician (1936–1991)

Otto C. Neumann (1936 – April 8, 1991) was an American Republican politician.

== Life ==
Neumann was born in Hartford, Connecticut, the son of Otto W. Neumann and his wife Madelyn Colby Neumann (died 1996). His mother was active in civic organizations, served as president of the Hartford Board of Education, and made an unsuccessful run for mayor as a Republican in 1973. Neumann graduated from Wesleyan University in Middletown, Connecticut and earned a master's degree from Syracuse University. He moved to the small northern Connecticut town of Granby in 1961 to become Chief Administrative Officer (later renamed to Town Manager). In 1969 he was elected First Selectman, a position he held until 1977. He also served a term as chairman of the Capitol Region Council of Governments. In 1979 he was elected state representative from the 62nd House District and rose through the ranks to become chairman of the Appropriations Committee. He resigned in 1987 when Governor William A. O'Neill appointed him to the five-member commission in charge of the Connecticut Department of Public Utility Control, an office he held until his death.

== Family ==
Neumann married his wife Diane before moving to Granby. They had four children: Otto Jr., Mark, Kurt, and Jennifer. Diane (now Diane Hernsdorf after her marriage in 1998 to Roger Hernsdorf) served as First Selectman 1987-9, and as of 2024 Mark is a selectman in Granby.

== Death ==
Otto Neumann died on April 8, 1991, at Hartford Hospital of complications following surgery. He is buried in Granby Cemetery in Granby, Connecticut.
