= James Sánchez =

James Sánchez may refer to:

- James Sánchez (politician), Connecticut politician
- James Sánchez (footballer), Colombian footballer
