= Connecticut's 4th House of Representatives district =

American legislative district

Connecticut's 4th State House of Representatives district
Representative
Julio Concepcion; D

Connecticut's 4th House of Representatives district elects one member of the Connecticut House of Representatives. The seat is held by Julio Concepcion. The district consists of part of the city of Hartford, including the neighborhoods of Charter Oak, South Meadows and Barry Square. The district is one of the few in Connecticut with a Hispanic-majority population, along with the neighboring 3rd district.

== List of representatives ==
List of representatives from Connecticut's 4th State House district
Representative	Party	Years	District home	Note
Paul A. LaRosa	Democratic	1967–1973	Hartford	Seat created
Abraham Giles	Democratic	1973–1983	Hartford	
Felix Karsky	Democratic	1983–1987	Hartford	
John Fonfara	Democratic	1987–1993	Hartford	
Edwin E. Garcia	Democratic	1993–1997	Hartford	
Evelyn Mantilla	Democratic	1997–2007	Hartford	Did not seek reelection
Kelvin Roldán	Democratic	2007–2013	Hartford	Did not seek reelection
Angel Arce	Democratic	2013–2018	Hartford	Resigned
Julio Concepcion	Democratic	2018–present	Hartford	

== Recent elections ==
Democratic Primary, August 10, 2010: House District 4
Party	Candidate	Votes	%	±%
Democratic	Kelvin Roldán	382	50.4	
Democratic	Ángel Morales	376	49.6	
Majority		6	0.8	
Turnout		758		

State Election 2008: House District 4
Party	Candidate	Votes	%	±%
Democratic	Kelvin Roldán	3,026	92.9	−7.1
Connecticut for Lieberman	Bryce Snarski-Pierce	238	7.1	+7.1
Majority		2,788	82.9	−17.1
Turnout		3,364		
Democratic hold		Swing	-7.1	

State Election 2006: House District 4
Party	Candidate	Votes	%	±%
Democratic	Kelvin Roldán	1,254	100.0	+14.2
Majority		1,254	100.0	+28.4
Turnout		1,254		
Democratic hold		Swing	+14.2	

Democratic Primary, August 8, 2006: House District 4
Party	Candidate	Votes	%	±%
Democratic	Kelvin Roldán	718	63.9	
Democratic	Ángel Arce	406	36.1	
Majority		312	27.8	
Turnout		1,124		

State Election 2004: House District 4
Party	Candidate	Votes	%	±%
Democratic	Evelyn Mantilla	2,390	85.8	−2.1
Republican	Robert Iacomacci	395	14.2	+2.1
Majority		1,995	71.6	−4.3
Turnout		2,785		
Democratic hold		Swing	-2.1	

State Election 2002: House District 4
Party	Candidate	Votes	%	±%
Democratic	Evelyn Mantilla	1,335	87.9	−12.1
Republican	Aldo P. Provera, Jr.	183	12.1	+12.1
Majority		1,152	75.9	−24.1
Turnout		1,518		
Democratic hold		Swing	-12.1	

State Election 2000: House District 4
Party	Candidate	Votes	%	±%
Democratic	Evelyn Mantilla	2,051	100.0	+11.9
Majority		2,051	100.0	
Turnout		2,051		
Democratic hold		Swing	+11.9	

State Election 1998: House District 4
Party	Candidate	Votes	%	±%
Democratic	Evelyn Mantilla	1,308	88.1	
Independent	Gabriel Jose Carrera	177	11.9	
Majority		1,131	76.2	
Turnout		1,485		
Democratic hold		Swing		
