= William A. DiBella =

American politician and businessman (born 1943)

Member of the Connecticut State Senate from the 1st district
- In office February 18, 1981 – January 8, 1997
- Preceded by: Joseph J. Fauliso
- Succeeded by: John Fonfara

Member of the Connecticut House of Representatives from the 1st district
- In office January 7, 1981 – February 18, 1981
- Preceded by: Mary Ellen Flynn
- Succeeded by: Felix Karsky

Personal details
- Born: May 17, 1943 (age 83) Hartford, Connecticut U.S.
- Party: Democratic
- Spouse: Donna DiBella
- Children: Marc DiBella

William A. DiBella (born May 17, 1943) is an American politician and businessman who has served as chairman of the board of the Metropolitan District Commission of Connecticut since 2002, a post he previously held from 1977 to 1981. DiBella is currently a lobbyist, and a Principal at CMD Ventures LLC., a company which specializes in real estate management and property development.

== Personal life ==
William DiBella was born in the city of Hartford, Connecticut in 1943. He is married to Donna DiBella and together they have a son named Marc who is also a politician and lobbyist in Hartford. William DiBella resides with his wife in Old Saybrook and with his son at his son's apartment in Hartford's iconic, I.M. Pei designed, Bushnell Tower; but for political reasons he maintains legal residency in Hartford.

== Political career ==
=== Local ===
DiBella's political career got its start when he was elected as a member of the Hartford City Council, a position he would hold from 1971 to 1979. He was also Deputy Mayor of Hartford from 1975 to 1977, serving under Mayor George A. Athanson.

=== State ===
In 1980, DiBella ran for State Representative in Connecticut's 1st assembly district defeating Republican challenger Anthonye S. Esposito 75.1% to 24.9%. This district consists of Southeastern Bloomfield and Northwestern Hartford, he served as Representative during 1981. On February 17, 1981, he won a special election to the Connecticut State Senate representing Connecticut's 1st Senate District which includes the southern half of Hartford and northern half of Wethersfield, he stayed in the Senate until 1996. DiBella served as the Majority Leader of the Connecticut Senate from 1992 to 1994.

=== MDC ===
The Metropolitan District Commission of Connecticut is a public municipal corporation empowered by a 1929 Charter from the Connecticut State Assembly, as the water and sewage supplier for much of Metro Hartford the MDC has immense power. It operates with an exceptional level of autonomy and even has its own police force. DiBella was first appointed to the MDC Board of Directors in 1977 and served until 1981. He was appointed a second time to the Board in 2002.

== Scandals ==
=== Residency ===
In 2016 a complaint was made that DiBella did not meet the legal residency standards of a Hartford resident. The complaint was made that DiBella lived in Old Saybrook, Connecticut with his wife while claiming to live in Hartford even though he owned no property there. DiBella claimed that he was living with his son Marc when in Hartford and had his own bedroom in their apartment. The State of Connecticut Election Enforcement Commission investigated the claim and found in DiBella's favor in part because he kept a toothbrush and other minor toiletries at his son's apartment and he also received mail there.

=== Involvement in Corruption and Racketeering ===
In 2008 a Federal Court ordered William A. DiBella to pay a penalty of $795,000 for his role in a fraudulent investment scheme. It was alleged that DiBella was involved in a scheme with former Treasurer of the State of Connecticut Paul J. Silvester in which they received kickbacks from Thayer Capital Partners in return for steering $75 million in State Retirement and Trust Fund business to them. DiBella used his career as a lobbyist to cover up the illegal income. The US Securities and Exchange Commission became interested in DiBella during the course of a bribery investigation into Silvester, Thayer Capital, and Thayer Executive Fred Malek. The relationship between DiBella and Malek went beyond Malek's relationship with Silverster; DiBella testified in federal court that Fred Malek told him "I need you for the new treasurer,” the incoming Denise Nappier. DiBella's contract also required him to assist Malek personally with "ongoing investor relations."

The scheme moved much of the State Retirement and Trust Fund into high-risk, long term, non-liquid private equity funds that unbalanced the investment plan, increasing the risk of a long term failure. DiBella co-conspirator Silvester served 79 months in prison for his leading role in the racketeering and corruption. This was one in a long series of court cases in the 1990s and 2000s involving corrupt Connecticut politicians, political corruption was rampant at the highest level in Connecticut during and before this time with a number of Connecticut Politicians serving federal time in the coming years, including Governor John G. Rowland, Bridgeport Mayor Joe Ganim and Hartford Mayor Eddie Perez.

=== MDC ===
DiBellas position as MDC Chairman was not affected by his fraudulent and corrupt undertaking, even though there have been widespread calls for him to step down. The Federation of Connecticut Taxpayer Organizations has added DiBella to their “Hall of Shame” of politicians who grossly betray the public's trust. Fellow MDC Commissioner Mark Pappa stated that “If this was a publicly traded company this conversation wouldn't even happen because there's no question Mr. DiBella would not be sitting here.”

=== Press ===
His relationship with the press has been contentious, a New York Times article claims that his nickname among the press is "the Ken doll from hell.” a nickname that makes light of his trademark hair and flashy style.
