= Barbara Kennelly =

American politician (born 1936)

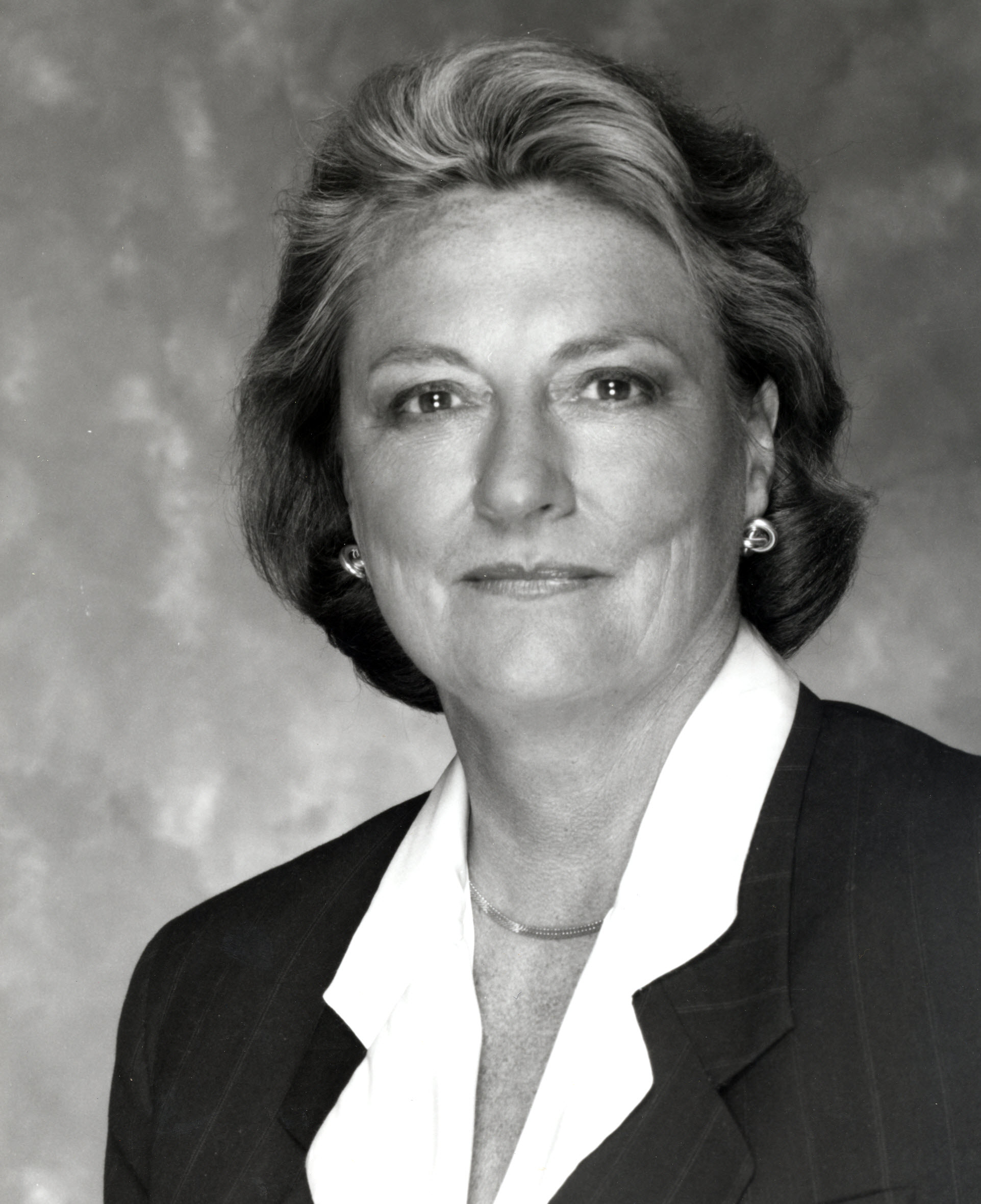

Vice Chair of the House Democratic Caucus
- In office January 3, 1995 – January 3, 1999
- Leader: Dick Gephardt
- Preceded by: Vic Fazio
- Succeeded by: Bob Menendez

Member of the U.S. House of Representatives from Connecticut's 1st district
- In office January 12, 1982 – January 3, 1999
- Preceded by: Bill Cotter
- Succeeded by: John B. Larson

67th Secretary of State of Connecticut
- In office January 5, 1979 – January 12, 1982
- Governor: Ella Grasso; William O'Neill
- Preceded by: Henry Cohn
- Succeeded by: Maura Melley

Personal details
- Born: Barbara Ann Bailey; July 10, 1936 (age 90) Hartford, Connecticut, U.S.
- Party: Democratic
- Spouse: James Kennelly (m. 1959; died 1995)
- Children: 4
- Education: Trinity Washington University (BA); Harvard University; Trinity College (MA)

Barbara Bailey Kennelly (born Barbara Ann Bailey; July 10, 1936) is an American politician. She is a former Democratic member of the United States House of Representatives from Connecticut.

== Personal life and education ==
Kennelly was born Barbara Ann Bailey in Hartford, Connecticut, on July 10, 1936. Her father was long-time Democratic Party leader John M. Bailey.

Kennelly studied at St. Joseph Cathedral School and graduated from Mount St. Joseph Academy in West Hartford in 1954. She earned a B.A. from Trinity College in Washington, D.C. (now Trinity Washington University) in 1958 and a certificate from the Harvard-Radcliffe Program in Business Administration in 1959. In 1971, she earned a master's degree from Trinity College in Connecticut.

In 1959, Kennelly married James Kennelly, an attorney who served as speaker of the Connecticut House of Representatives from 1975 to 1979. They had four children together. James died in 1995.

== Career ==
In 1975, Kennelly was elected to the Hartford Court of Common Council, a position she held until 1979. She served as the Secretary of the State of Connecticut from 1979 until 1982.

Kennelly was elected to Congress in a special election to fill the vacancy caused by the death of William R. Cotter. She represented Connecticut's First Congressional District in the United States House of Representatives for eight terms, from January 12, 1982, until January 3, 1999. During the 98th Congress, Kennelly was appointed to the Ways and Means Committee. She served on the Subcommittees on Human Resources and Select Revenue Measures. Beginning in 1987, she served on the Permanent Select Committee on Intelligence. During the 103rd Congress, Kennelly became Vice-Chair of the Democratic Caucus.

She did not seek re-election in 1998, instead running for Governor of Connecticut against and losing to Republican incumbent John G. Rowland by a landslide.

In 1999, President Bill Clinton appointed her Associate Commissioner and Counselor to the Commissioner at the Social Security Administration. She later worked at the law firm Baker & Hostetler. From 2002 to 2011, she served as President of the National Committee to Preserve Social Security and Medicare. In 2006, Nancy Pelosi appointed her to the Social Security Advisory Board. In 2011, Kennelly accepted a position at her alma mater, Trinity Washington University, as a distinguished professor of political science.

As of 2015, Kennelly is a member of the board of the International Foundation for Electoral Systems, a non-profit that provides assistance with elections in many countries. She is the president of the United States Association of Former Members of Congress.

The Barbara B. Kennelly Post Office Building in Hartford is named in her honor.

== See also ==
- Women in the United States House of Representatives

Party political offices
Preceded by Gloria Schaffer	Democratic nominee for Secretary of the State of Connecticut; 1978	Succeeded by Julia Tashjian
Preceded by Robert Byrd, Alan Cranston, Al Gore, Gary Hart, Bennett Johnston, Ted Kennedy, Tip O'Neill, Don Riegle, Paul Sarbanes, Jim Sasser	Response to the State of the Union address 1983; Served alongside: Les AuCoin, Joe Biden, Bill Bradley, Robert Byrd, Tom Daschle, Bill Hefner, George Miller, Tip O'Neill, Paul Simon, Paul Tsongas, Tim Wirth	Succeeded by Max Baucus, Joe Biden, David Boren, Barbara Boxer, Robert Byrd, Dante Fascell, Bill Gray, Tom Harkin, Dee Huddleston, Carl Levin, Tip O'Neill, Claiborne Pell
Preceded by Vic Fazio	Vice Chair of the House Democratic Conference; 1995–1999	Succeeded by Bob Menendez
Preceded by Bill Curry	Democratic nominee for Governor of Connecticut; 1998	Succeeded by Bill Curry
Political offices
Preceded by Henry Cohn	Secretary of State of Connecticut; 1979–1982	Succeeded by Maura Melley
U.S. House of Representatives
Preceded by Bill Cotter	Member of the U.S. House of Representatives from Connecticut's 1st congressional district 1982–1999	Succeeded by John Larson
U.S. order of precedence (ceremonial)
Preceded by Albio Sires as Former U.S. Representative	Order of precedence of the United States as Former U.S. Representative	Succeeded by Connie Morella as Former U.S. Representative
