= Fred Malek =

American business executive, political advisor, and philanthropist (1936–2019)

Director of the White House Presidential Personnel Office
- In office September 1970 – January 1973
- President: Richard Nixon
- Preceded by: Position established
- Succeeded by: Jerry H. Jones

Personal details
- Born: Frederick Vincent Malek; December 22, 1936 Berwyn, Illinois, U.S.
- Died: March 24, 2019 (aged 82) Virginia, U.S.
- Party: Republican
- Spouse: Marlene
- Children: 2
- Education: United States Military Academy (BS); Harvard University (MBA)

Frederic Vincent Malek (December 22, 1936 – March 24, 2019) was an American business executive, political advisor, fraudster, and philanthropist. He was a president of Marriott Hotels and Northwest Airlines and an assistant to United States Presidents Richard Nixon (in whose purge of Jewish government employees Malek would take an active role) and George H. W. Bush. Active in politics for more than fifty years, Malek also served as a National Finance Committee Chair of Sen. John McCain's 2008 presidential campaign, as well as the finance chair for the Republican Governors Association, and played various roles in the campaign of every Republican nominee for president, with the exception of Donald Trump, over the past four decades. Malek also served as the chair of the board of visitors of the United States Military Academy at West Point, and was active in philanthropic efforts to support the academy. In 2011, in recognition of his commitment to free enterprise and community service, he received the Horatio Alger Award.

== Early life ==
Malek was born in Berwyn, Illinois, the son of Martha Dorothy (Smicklas) and Frederic William Malek, a beer truck driver. He was of Czech and Croatian descent. He was raised in Chicago, and graduated with a Bachelor of Science from the United States Military Academy in 1959. He served in the Vietnam War as an airborne ranger, assigned to a special forces unit.

Malek received his Master of Business Administration from Harvard Business School in 1964 and worked as a management consultant for McKinsey & Co. He and two classmates made a pact to purchase a business together; two would work and support the third while he scouted out opportunities. In 1967, he left McKinsey and, with his partners, purchased Triangle Corp., a struggling hand tool manufacturing company in Orangeburg, South Carolina.

=== Dog-barbecuing incident ===
In August 1959, Malek and four other men were arrested in Vicary's Park near Peoria, Illinois, after a dog was killed, eviscerated and barbecued on a spit. Charges of cruelty to animals were later dismissed against all but one of the men, Andrew P. O'Meara, who testified that he alone had struck and killed the dog, skinned it and tried to cook it, in order to teach the others something about living off the land.

The story came up again when Malek became an advisor and fundraiser to Sarah Palin in the 2008 presidential campaign. Amid accusations that Malek himself had killed and barbecued the dog, Malek, in his blog, quoted O'Meara, a retired Army colonel, taking "full responsibility" for what happened.

During the 2012 presidential campaign the incident once again came up when Malek's hosting of Ann Romney's birthday party was brought up by the semi-satirical group Dogs Against Romney.

== Business career ==
=== Marriott Corp. ===
In 1975, Malek joined Bethesda-based Marriott Corporation, and was quickly promoted, eventually becoming president of Marriott Hotels. He was elected executive vice president of Marriott in March 1978. Under Malek's oversight of the hotel and resort division from 1981 to 1988, earnings increased nearly fourfold, or 18 percent a year, during a period that encompassed a recession, industry overbuilding and profit declines by competitors.

In early 1989, Malek became a senior advisor to the Carlyle Group. He led a group of investors to purchase the Coldwell Banker Commercial Group, the nation's largest commercial real estate services company, from Sears, Roebuck and Company at a price estimated at $300 million. He went on to become co-chairman of the company, serving on the board of directors for 29 years, helping to increase the value of the company to over $15 billion.

=== Northwest Airlines ===
Malek soon joined Los Angeles investor Al Checchi and Marriott's Gary Wilson in a $3.65 billion, all-cash purchase of Northwest Airlines. The investor group was joined in the leveraged buyout by KLM Royal Dutch Airlines and Elders IXL, which contributed $480 million in equity. Malek and Checchi joined the airline's 10-member board, and Malek became president.

In July 1989, Malek and a group of Carlyle investors bought Marriott's leading airline catering division for an estimated price of $650 million. From January 1, 2002, to December 31, 2005, Malek was a member of the board of directors of Fannie Mae.

=== Thayer Lodging Group ===
In 1991, Malek founded Thayer Lodging Group, a private equity firm named after Sylvanus Thayer, West Point class of 1808, the "father of the Military Academy."

Thayer has a lengthy and successful track record: since forming its first private equity fund in 1991, Thayer has completed 41 hotel investments with a total acquisition cost of approximately $2.4 billion. Thayer's funds currently own a portfolio of 14 hotels and 3,637 guest rooms. On July 1, 2013, Thayer acquired Ritz Carlton-San Francisco to the delight of Malek, who said, "we hope to replicate the success of our Orlando Grand Lakes Ritz Carlton, one of our highest return investments."

On May 21, 2014, Thayer Lodging Group announced its acquisition by Brookfield Asset Management. Thayer continues to own the hotels it acquired during the years prior to its partnership with Brookfield. Malek continued to be actively involved as chairman of Thayer Lodging.

=== Thayer Capital Partners/Thayer Hidden Creek/HCI Equity Partners ===
In 1993, Malek also founded and became chairman of Thayer Capital Partners, a Washington, D.C.-based private equity firm. In 2005 the company merged with Hidden Creek Partners and was renamed to Thayer Hidden Creek. Following the SEC administrative action and a number of other setbacks the company rebranded as HCI Equity Partners, a name it operated under as of 2016.

==== Fraud ====
On August 12, 2003, the SEC filed a civil fraud lawsuit against former Connecticut state Senate Democratic Majority Leader William DiBella for participating in a fraudulent scheme to invest $75 million of the state pension funds with Malek's firm, Thayer Capital Partners. On May 18, 2007, Thayer was found in negligence of the Investment Advisers Act of 1940, and was ultimately forced to pay a civil penalty of $150,000, while Malek personally paid a fine of $100,000 for his role in the affair.

It was alleged that Malek acted to enrich himself as well as advance his own political and financial interests, in addition to the benefit the fraudulent scheme would bring to him as a significant partner in Thayer. Former Connecticut State Senator and Representative DiBella testified under oath in federal court that his relationship with Malek went beyond the latter's official position at Thayer, he testified that his contract obligated him to assist Malek personally with "ongoing investor relations.” and that Malek personally told him "I need you for the new treasurer” (the new treasurer being the incoming Denise Nappier). The scheme moved much of the Connecticut State Retirement and Trust Fund into high-risk, long term, non-liquid private equity funds (such as Thayer's). This unbalanced the investment plan, increasing the risk of a long term failure.

=== Major League Baseball ===
Malek was a co-owner in the Texas Rangers of Major League Baseball, along with George W. Bush and other investors, from 1989 to 1998. After selling his stake in the team, Malek earned his money back fivefold.

Beginning in 1999, Malek led the recruitment of the Montreal Expos franchise to Washington, D.C. Working alongside city leaders, Malek set up the Washington Baseball Club, an ultimately unsuccessful investment group with partners that included Jeff Zients, Steve Porter, Paul Wolff, Frank Raines, Jim Kimsey, Colin Powell, Vernon Jordan and David Bradley.

== Political career ==
=== Nixon administration ===
Malek served in the Nixon administration in several different roles, including Deputy Under Secretary of the Department of Health, Education, and Welfare under Secretaries Robert Finch and Elliot Richardson, as well as special assistant to the president from 1970 to 1973, and deputy director of the Office of Management and Budget from 1973 to 1975. Malek served as deputy chief of the Committee to Re-elect the President in 1972.

As a management expert to Nixon, Malek helped restructure the White House Personnel Office, and recruited cabinet and sub-cabinet officials. In his memoirs, Nixon described Malek as a "tough young businessman whose specialty was organization and management."

In the first Nixon administration, Malek designed and directed the "Responsiveness Program", a strategy to replace civil servants with Nixon supporters and to steer government resources to benefit Nixon's 1972 re-election. According to the Senate Watergate report, Malek wrote in a 1972 memo to Haldeman that someone was needed to "take the lead in the program to politicize Departments and Agencies" and to "supervise the patronage operation and closely monitor the grantmanship operation." In advocating the plan, Malek wrote of "substantial risks" to politicizing the Executive Branch and expressed concern that the plan would "undoubtably backfire" if made public; therefore he recommended that "to minimize any links to the President, there should be no directions on this project in writing."

As an advisor to President Nixon, Malek played a significant role in the early days of the Environmental Protection Agency, earning credit from William Ruckelshaus, the agency's first administrator, and others for helping to ensure that EPA had outstanding top people in its ranks.

Malek was sworn in as deputy director of the Office of Management and Budget on February 2, 1973. He served until 1975, when he resigned to re-enter the private sector.

==== Nixon Jew count ====
In 1971, Richard Nixon became convinced the Bureau of Labor Statistics (BLS) had come under the control of Democratic rivals and what Nixon termed a "Jewish cabal". He instructed aides Charles Colson and H. R. Haldeman to identify a list of Democrats and "important Jewish officials" at the agency. Malek provided the data on Democrats after a check of voter registration rolls, but balked at fulfilling the rest of Nixon's query. "I refused four times. The fifth time he came back and gave me a direct order through Haldeman, so I gave him a number. I regret my compliance. It was a mistake." Malek did not have access to BLS employees' religious affiliations, so his list comprised those BLS employees with "Jewish-sounding names", and two months after he sent the list, two of the officials on it were reassigned to "less visible jobs" within the Labor Dept.

Seymour D. Reich, chairman of Conference of Presidents of Major American Jewish Organizations during the 1990s, said "Malek made a mistake 18 years ago when he agreed to a regrettable request by President Nixon." But he added, Malek "has taken pains to assure the Jewish community that he realizes his error and that he intended no harm. I believe he is sincere." In 2010, Sen. Dianne Feinstein (D-Ca.) called Malek "a man of high principle" who "has proved many times over the years his loyalty to the highest principles of freedom, human rights and international tolerance". On December 15, 2014, Malek received the Anti Defamation League's Achievement award during a ceremony in Washington, D.C.

=== Bush administration ===
In February 1988, Malek resigned as president of Marriott Hotels to direct the Republican National Convention for then vice-president, George H. W. Bush. He was said to be "on track" for chief of staff in the Bush White House, but resigned after acknowledging that in 1971, at the request of President Nixon he drew up a list of important Jewish officials at the Bureau of Labor Statistics. Malek, who was a special assistant to Mr. Nixon, emphatically denied that he had engaged in an anti-Semitic act.

In September 1989, Malek was appointed by President Bush to coordinate plans for the 1990 economic summit of industrialized nations. The appointment was seen as a test of whether Malek could successfully serve in the administration. Malek served as director of the 1990 Economic Summit of Industrialized Nations, with the rank of ambassador, where he was responsible for the preparation and staging of the event.

The appointment proved a success, and in 1992 Bush appointed Fred Malek manager for his re-election campaign. Malek was "responsible for nuts-and-bolts daily management." Malek ran the campaign with fundraiser Robert Mosbacher and pollster Robert Teeter out of a rented office in downtown Washington.

Malek also served as co-chairman of the finance committee for John McCain in 2008.

=== American Action Network ===
Malek was a co-founder, former chairman and one of three executive committee members of the American Action Network, a 501(c)(4) center-right think tank established in January 2010 to promote policies based on the principles of freedom, limited government, and strong national security.

=== Republican Governors Association ===
Malek chaired the Executive Roundtable of the Republican Governors Association, an organization supporting the election of Republican governors. In 2012 it was announced that Malek agreed to serve as the Republican Governors Association's finance chairman. Under Malek's leadership, the RGA outpaced the Democratic Governors Association, and republican governors increased from 21 in 2008 to 33 in 2018.

=== Virginia government reform commission ===
On May 7, 2010, Virginia Governor Robert McDonnell appointed Malek to chair a 31-member commission to find efficiencies and savings in government. Critics objected to Malek's appointment based on both the BLS and SEC administrative action. In particular his anti-semitic past was singled out for criticism, less attention was paid to the Connecticut racketeering case. McDonnell responded that he did not know of these parts of Malek's past.

== Philanthropy ==
=== West Point ===
Speaking of his time at West Point, Malek said "Harvard was extraordinarily helpful in teaching me to analyze problems on a purely academic front, but in terms of overall effect, it was not even close to the U.S. Military Academy in making me who I am. West Point builds the entire structure of the man, the values of the man. It develops you in the whole."

In 2008, Malek was nominated by President George W. Bush to the board of visitors of the United States Military Academy at West Point. Malek would go on to become the chairman of the board in 2011.

In addition, Malek was a philanthropic supporter of West Point, leading the largest ever capital campaign to fund the Frederic Malek West Point Visitors Center in 2017. He also underwrote the Malek Tennis Center.

=== Marymount ===
On Tuesday, May 29, 2012, Marymount University celebrated the formal renaming of its School of Health Professions in honor of Fred and Marlene Malek. Malek's wife, Marlene Malek, graduated from the school in 1979 and was a member of the Marymount board of trustees. The School of Health Professions was renamed "Malek School of Health Professions" to honor the Maleks' ongoing commitment to Marymount University.

Fred and Marlene Malek were honored with the Outstanding Philanthropist Award by the Association of Fundraising Professionals' Washington, DC, Metro Area Chapter at their National Capital Philanthropy Day in 2012.

=== American Friends of the Czech Republic ===
Malek, of Czech descent, was the chairman of the American Friends of the Czech Republic. Following the April 17, 2013, explosion that left West, TX devastated, Malek and the Friends of the Czech Republic donated substantial funds to help put the town of primarily Czech descent back on its feet; the group even sponsored an essay contest for two children to travel on an all expenses paid trip to the Czech Republic. Following unprecedented flooding in Prague and nearby villages in early June 2013, Malek traveled to the city to meet with Ambassador Norm Eisen and local officials to pledge aid and discuss ways to help the region recover.

== Personal life ==
Malek was married to Marlene A. Malek. They had two children and lived in McLean, Virginia.

Malek was a "fitness fanatic" who had kept up physically healthy habits since West Point. A skiing accident in the mid-1980s left Malek with an artificial hip, which forced him to switch from running to lifting weights, swimming and bicycling. He had also twice survived cancer.

Malek died on March 24, 2019, following complications from hip surgery.

== Published works ==
- Malek, Frederic V. (January 1, 1979). Washington's Hidden Tragedy: The Failure to Make Government Work. Free Press. ISBN 978-0029197905.
