= 1998 Connecticut gubernatorial election =

- November 3, 1998
- Turnout: 56.59%
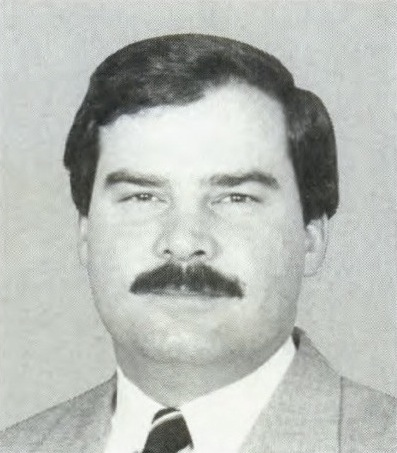

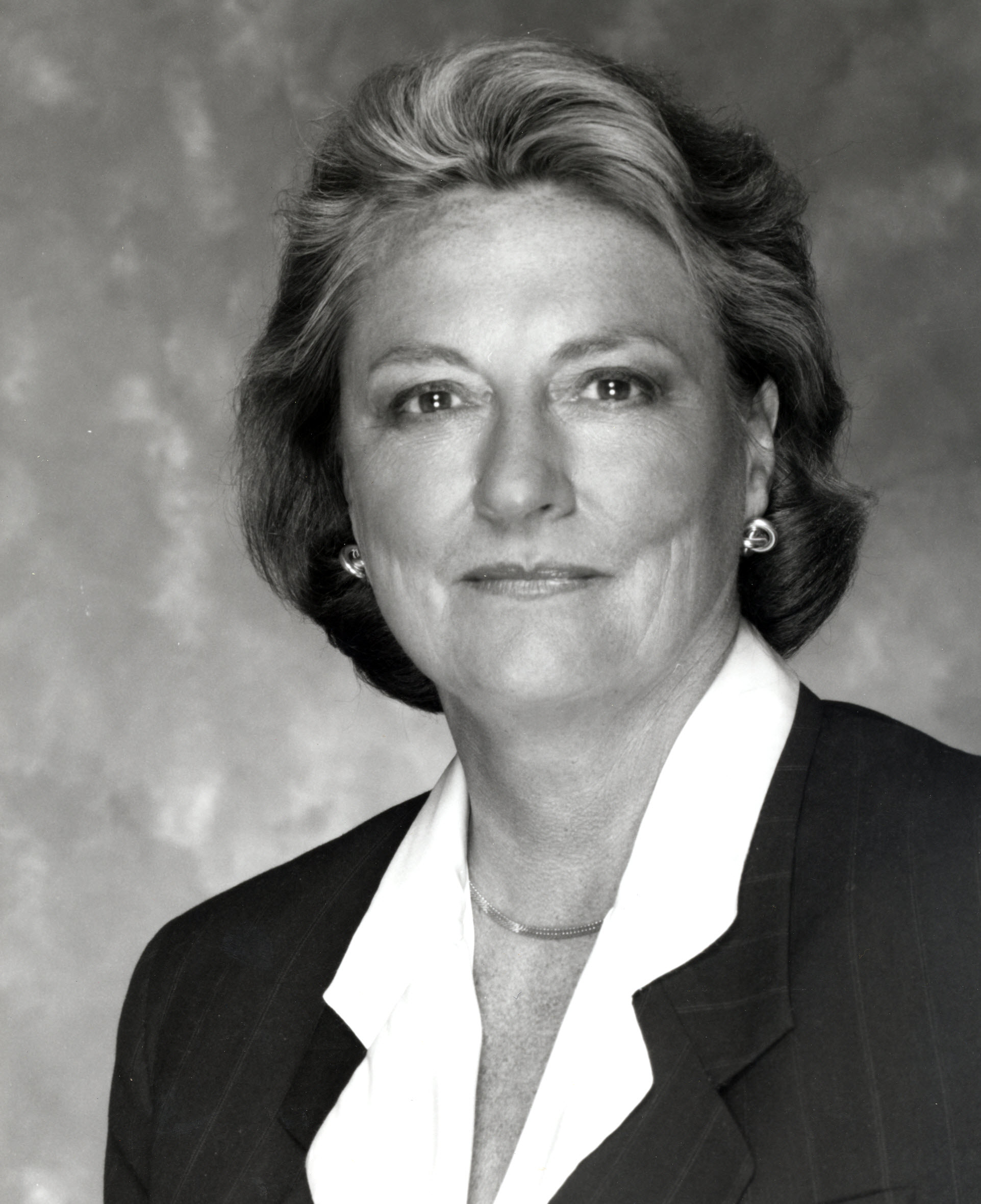
Nominee	John G. Rowland	Barbara B. Kennelly
Party	Republican	Democratic
Running mate	Jodi Rell	Joe Courtney
Popular vote	628,707	354,187
Percentage	62.90%	35.44%
- Rowland: 40–50% 50–60% 60–70% 70–80% 80–90% Kennelly: 40–50% 50–60% 60–70% 70–80%
Governor before election
John G. Rowland
Republican
Elected Governor
John G. Rowland
Republican

The 1998 Connecticut gubernatorial election took place on November 3, 1998, and incumbent Republican Governor John G. Rowland won re-election against Democratic Candidate United States Congresswoman Barbara B. Kennelly. This election was the first time since 1944 that an incumbent Republican Governor of Connecticut was re-elected.

== Republican primary ==
=== Candidates ===
- John G. Rowland, incumbent governor since 1995

=== Results ===
Rowland was unopposed in the Republican primary.

== Democratic primary ==
=== Candidates ===
- Barbara B. Kennelly, U.S. representative from Hartford

=== Results ===
Kennelly was unopposed in the Democratic primary.

== General election ==
=== Candidates ===
- Barbara Kennelly, U.S. representative from Hartford (Democratic)
  - Running mate: Joe Courtney, state representative from Vernon
- John G. Rowland, incumbent governor since 1995 (Republican)
  - Running mate: Jodi Rell, incumbent lieutenant governor since 1995
- Roberta Scaglione (Term Limits)
- Ned Vare (Libertarian)
- Joseph A. Zdonczyk (Concerned Citizens)

=== Predictions ===
Source	Ranking	As of
The Cook Political Report	Solid R	November 3, 1998

=== Polling ===
Poll source	Date(s) administered	Sample size (Note: Key: A – all adults RV – registered voters LV – likely voters V – unclear)	Margin of error	John Rowland (R)	Barbara Kennelly (D)	Other / undecided (Note: Calculated by taking the difference of 100% and all other candidates combined.)
Quinnipiac University Polling Institute	October 30, 1998	491	—	67%	26%	7%
Mason-Dixon Polling & Strategy	October 26–27, 1998	633 (LV)	± 4.0%	58%	33%	9%
Forman Center	October 22, 1998	557	—	51%	43%	6%
Quinnipiac University Polling Institute	October 13–19, 1998	683 (LV)	± 3.8%	72%	24%	4%
Mason-Dixon Polling & Strategy	October 9–12, 1998	629 (LV)	± 4.0%	60%	28%	12%
University of Connecticut	September 12–16, 1998	505 (A)	± 5.0%	60%	23%	17%
Quinnipiac University Polling Institute	June 16–22, 1998	1,088 (RV)	± 3.0%	56%	32%	12%
Quinnipiac University Polling Institute	February 10–16, 1998	1,303 (RV)	± 3.0%	52%	35%	23%
Quinnipiac University Polling Institute	November 11–17, 1997	1,120 (RV)	± 3.0%	43%	44%	13%

=== Results ===
1998 Connecticut gubernatorial election
Party	Candidate	Votes	%	±%
Republican	John G. Rowland (incumbent)	628,707	62.90%	+26.70%
Democratic	Barbara B. Kennelly	354,187	35.44%	+2.73%
Concerned Citizens	Joseph A. Zdonczyk	8,792	0.88%	+0.01%
Libertarian	Ned Vare	5,637	0.56%	N/A
Term Limits	Roberta Scaglione	2,212	0.22%	N/A
Total votes		999,535	100.00%	N/A
Republican hold				

==== By county ====
Rowland won all eight counties, flipping five counties.

County	John G. Rowland Republican		Barbara B. Kennelly Democratic		Other parties Independent		Total votes cast		
County	Fairfield	154,893	66.09%	75,728	32.31%	3,739	Total votes cast	1.60%	234,360
Hartford	159,654	59.68%	103,607	38.73%	4,277	1.60%	267,538		
Litchfield	44,150	72.32%	15,765	25.82%	1,132	1.85%	61,047		
Middlesex	33,962	62.80%	19,342	35.77%	775	1.43%	54,079		
New Haven	150,487	63.85%	80,274	34.06%	4,933	2.09%	235,694		
New London	42,451	57.72%	30,204	41.07%	895	1.22%	73,550		
Tolland	26,555	61.44%	16,163	37.39%	505	1.17%	43,223		
Windham	16,555	55.10%	13,104	43.62%	385	1.28%	30,044		
Total	628,707	62.90%	354,187	35.44%	16,643 (Note: 2 write-in votes for John Demko were not listed to a specific county)	4.41%	999,537		

Counties that flipped from Democratic to Republican

- Hartford (largest town: Hartford)
- Middlesex (largest town: Middletown)
- Tolland (largest town: Vernon)
- Windham (largest town: Windham)

Counties that flipped from A Connecticut Party to Republican

- New London (largest town: Norwich)

=== By congressional district ===
Rowland won all six congressional districts, including four that elected Democrats.

District	Rowland	Kennelly	Representative
1st	56%	42%	Barbara Kennelly (105th Congress)
1st	56%	42%	John Larson (106th Congress)
2nd	58%	40%	Sam Gejdenson
3rd	60%	38%	Rosa DeLauro
4th	63%	35%	Chris Shays
5th	71%	27%	James Maloney
6th	68%	30%	Nancy Johnson

== Notes ==
Partisan clients
