= John Fonfara =

American politician (born 1955)

John W. Fonfara

Member of the Connecticut State Senate from the 1st district
- Incumbent
- Assumed office January 1997
- Preceded by: William A. DiBella

Member of the Connecticut House of Representatives from the 6th district
- In office January 1993 – January 1997
- Preceded by: Edna Negron Rosario
- Succeeded by: Art Feltman

Member of the Connecticut House of Representatives from the 4th district
- In office 1987–1993
- Preceded by: Felix Karsky
- Succeeded by: Edwin E. Garcia

Personal details
- Born: December 1, 1955 (age 70) Hartford, Connecticut, U.S.
- Party: Democratic
- Education: University of Connecticut (BA); Trinity College (MPP)

John W. Fonfara (born December 1, 1955) is an American politician serving in the Connecticut State Senate since 1997, representing the 1st district, comprising parts of Hartford and Wethersfield. A member of the Democratic Party, he is serving in his 13th-term in the State Senate, and is the chair of the Finance, Revenue & Bonding Committee.

Prior to being elected to the State Senate, he represented the 6th district in the State House. In 2023, Fonfara unsuccessfully ran to succeed the retiring Luke Bronin as Mayor of Hartford, but lost the primary election to Arunan Arulampalam.

== Early life and education ==
Fonfara was born and raised in the South End of Hartford, Connecticut, where he continues to live, and attended Hartford Public Schools. He earned a Bachelor of Arts in political science from the University of Connecticut in 1981 and a Master of Arts in public policy from Trinity College in 1991.

== Career ==
Fonfara served as a member of the Connecticut House of Representatives from 1987 to 1997. Elected to the Connecticut State Senate in 1996, he also serves as deputy majority leader. His district includes Hartford and Wethersfield. Since 2017, Fonfara has served as co-chair of the Senate Finance, Revenue and Bonding Committee, which manages Connecticut's budget. In 2019, Fonfara proposed legislation that would establish a state commission to fund toll roads. Fonfara also serves as vice chair of the Senate General Law Committee.

On January 9, 2023, Fonfara announced his candidacy in the Hartford mayoral election, vying to succeed the retiring Luke Bronin. He lost the primary election to Arunan Arulampalam.
