= Mary Ellen Flynn =

American politician (1932–2021)

Member of the Connecticut House of Representatives from the 1st district
- In office 1979–1981
- Preceded by: James Kennelly
- Succeeded by: William A. DiBella

Personal details
- Born: Mary Ellen Driscoll; July 5, 1932 New Britain, Connecticut, U.S.
- Died: August 31, 2021 (aged 89)
- Party: Democratic
- Spouse: John E. Flynn (m. 1953)
- Children: 2
- Education: University of Hartford; Central Connecticut State University

Mary Ellen Flynn (July 5, 1932 – August 31, 2021) was an American politician who served in the Connecticut House of Representatives from 1979 to 1981, representing the 1st district as a Democrat.

== Personal life ==
Mary Ellen Driscoll was born on July 5, 1932, in New Britain, Connecticut, to Daniel and Mary Driscoll. She graduated from New Britain High School and later attended the University of Hartford and Central Connecticut State University. On October 3, 1953, she married John E. Flynn. They had two children.

== Career ==
A Democrat, Flynn was elected to the 1st district of the Connecticut House of Representatives in a 1979 special election following James Kennelly's resignation. Flynn ran for election to a full term in 1980, but lost the Democratic nomination to William A. DiBella, who succeeded her in 1981. She lived in Hartford during her tenure.

== Death ==
Flynn died on August 31, 2021. She was 89.
