= María Colón Sánchez =

Puerto Rican politician (1926–1989)

Maria Colón Sánchez

Member of the Connecticut House of Representatives from the 6th district
- In office January 1989 – November 25, 1989
- Preceded by: Abraham Giles
- Succeeded by: Edna Negron Rosario

Personal details
- Born: Maria Clemencia Colón Sánchez; 1926 Comerío, Puerto Rico
- Died: November 25, 1989 (aged 63) Hartford, Connecticut, U.S.
- Party: Democratic

Maria Colón Sánchez (1926 – November 25, 1989) a.k.a. "La Madrina" (The Godmother), was an activist and politician who, in 1988, became the first Hispanic woman elected to the Connecticut General Assembly. She was also the founder of the Puerto Rican Parade Committee in 1964 and co-founded La Casa de Puerto Rico, the Society of Legal Services, the Spanish-American Merchants Association, the Puerto Rican Businessmen Association, and the Community Renewal Team.

== Early years ==
Colón Sánchez (birth name: Maria Clemencia Colón Sánchez) was born in Comerío, Puerto Rico. The oldest of five siblings, she received her primary education in her hometown. Her family's poor economic situation forced her to quit school in the 8th grade, in order to help her parents with the caring of her brothers and sister. In 1954, Colón Sánchez moved to Hartford, Connecticut, to live with her aunt. She held various jobs, and her work in the tobacco fields enabled her to send money to her family in Puerto Rico.

== Political activist ==
Colón Sánchez and her husband met political activist Olga Mele, who in 1954 was involved with the Puerto Rican community and was instrumental in convincing Puerto Ricans to register as voters for the upcoming elections.

Colón Sánchez and Mele, who were Catholics, complained that they couldn't confess at their local church (St. Peter's Church) because there were no Spanish-speaking priests. This resulted in the appointment of a priest in charge of the church's Hispanic worshipers. In 1959, Sánchez, Mele, and others at Sacred Heart Church demanded the removal of another priest from the parish, because he refused to move the Spanish-language mass out of the church basement. The petitioners' demands were met by the Chancery.

Colón Sánchez saved enough money to open her own storefront, "Maria's News Stand," on Albany Avenue in Hartford. The location would also serve her as an office for much of her political work. In 1964, she founded the Puerto Rican Parade Committee and in 1965, she was elected treasurer of the "Puerto Rican Democrats of Hartford," a political organization which she helped organize. In 1967, she organized the Spanish Action Coalition, an advocacy network.

== The Comanchero riot ==
On August 10, 1969, a bar brawl erupted between French Canadians and Puerto Ricans in Hartford. The brawl turned into a riot known as the "Comanchero riot" and was quickly classified as a political incident. Nearly 150 men gathered at the intersection of Park and Main streets, in order to air their social and economic grievances. Colón Sánchez, who helped to maintain communication with the police, the firefighters, and the general public, organized a meeting between the men and City Councilmen Nicholas Carbone, George Athanson and City Manager Elisha Freedman.

In this meeting, the elected officials heard many complaints about the discrimination to which Latinos were being subjected in the city of Hartford. This included police brutality, even in instances where Latinos came to the aid of the officers. During this meeting, Councilman Athanson urged Puerto Ricans to run a candidate for city council.

Also after this meeting, the Hartford Foundation donated $78,640 to the Greater Hartford Community Council to address Puerto Rican needs. Using the funds from the Hartford Foundation, Colón Sánchez and her colleagues transformed the Spanish Action Coalition into La Casa de Puerto Rico, the community's oldest social service agency.

== Educational reform for Bilingual Education ==
In 1971, Colón Sánchez, with the help of Perry Alan Zirkel, a professor at the University of Hartford, conceived the idea of creating a federally funded teacher recruitment program. The program, known as the Teachers Corps, hired Spanish-speaking teachers who could address the educational needs of Latino students, many of whom spoke Spanish as a primary language.

Colón Sánchez, together with Edna Negron Rosario, led the fight for mandatory bilingual education in Hartford. Though she was met with resistance from the non-Hispanic community who opposed the idea of bilingual education, Colón Sánchez persisted and, in 1972, she helped to open La Escuelita (The Little School), the first bilingual school in the state of Connecticut.

In 1973, with support from the Democratic Party, the Campaign Committee of the Bilingual Task Force, and a group organized by La Casa de Puerto Rico, Colón Sánchez won a seat on the Hartford Board of Education. She became the first Puerto Rican elected to public office in Hartford. She served on the Board for 16 years, during which time she continued to promote bilingual and bicultural education. In 1976 Colón Sánchez filed a lawsuit, which she won in 1978, mandating bilingual education throughout the entire Hartford public school system.

Colón Sánchez co-founded of the Society of Legal Services, the Spanish-American Merchants Association, the Puerto Rican Businessmen Association, and the Community Renewal Team.

== Elected State Representative ==
In 1979, Colón Sánchez expressed her desire to run for a seat as Councilwoman. She was supported by the Democratic town committee; and endorsed by the mayor, several councilmen, and the Hispanic Democratic Reform Club. Despite all of this support for Colón Sánchez, Councilman Nicholas Carbone, who was a powerful figure in the Democratic political machine, supported Mildred Torres instead. Carbone may have been prejudiced against Colón Sánchez's physical appearance and made her feel that she just wasn't ready. According to a statement made by Carbone when she ran for the school board:

We ran María for the school board and she spoke broken English. She wasn't an attractive woman, she was heavy, so where would you take her? How did you sell her? How did you get people to vote for her? And how did you get over the prejudice that she spoke with a thick accent? So we didn't take her into a lot of neighborhoods ... You had to be practical as you were trying to get her on the school board.

Torres won the election and became the first Puerto Rican to occupy a seat on Hartford's city council.

In 1988, Abe Giles, a member of the Democratic town committee in the sixth district, managed to have Colón Sánchez ousted from the committee. Colón Sánchez reacted to Giles's actions by running against him in a primary for a seat on the state legislature. She won the primary and in November of that year won the election. She thus became the first Hispanic woman elected to the Connecticut General Assembly.

Colón Sánchez held her seat until November 25, 1989, when she was found dead of a heart attack in her apartment at age 63. Bishop Peter Rosazza, who celebrated the mass of her funeral, stated that "she was well respected and strong." At the time of her death she was survived by four brothers: Jose J. Colón of Hartford; Benigno Colón, Arcardio Colón, and Pedro Colón and a sister, Luz Consuelo Colón de Fuentes.

== Legacy ==
In addition to being the first Puerto Rican to serve on Hartford's City Council and the first Hispanic woman elected to the Connecticut General Assembly, María Colón Sánchez had a record of leadership and community advocacy. She is regarded as an influential figure for subsequent generations.

The state of Connecticut honored her memory in 1993 by naming a school on Babcock Street in Frog Hollow the "María Sánchez Elementary School." A street close to her Newsstand was named "Maria Colón Sanchez Way" in her honor.

The Connecticut Institute for Community Development (CICD) Puerto Rican Parade, Inc. – Hartford Chapter created the annual "Maria C. Sanchez Award." Recipients are selected based on their outstanding contributions to the Puerto Rican and Hispanic community in the areas of leadership, education, community empowerment, cultural enrichment, and activism.

On October 14, 1993, Colón Sánchez was commemorated, along with other distinguished Hartford citizens, in the Hartford Public Library's Plaza of Fame. In 1995, she was inducted into the Connecticut Women's Hall of Fame.

== See also ==
- List of Puerto Ricans
