= Connecticut's 6th House of Representatives district =

American legislative district

Connecticut's 6th State House of Representatives district
Representative
Edwin Vargas; D

Connecticut's 6th House of Representatives district elects one member of the Connecticut House of Representatives. Its current representative is Edwin Vargas. The district consists of the southwest and south-central parts of the city of Hartford, including the South End neighborhood. The district is one of the few in Connecticut to have a Hispanic plurality population, but it also has the largest population of white residents of any Hartford district.

== List of representatives ==
List of Representatives from Connecticut's 6th State House District
Representative	Party	Years	District home	Note
George F. Murray Jr.	Democratic	1967–1969	Hartford	Seat created
George J. Ritter	Democratic	1969–1981	Hartford	
Thomas D. Ritter	Democratic	1981–1983	Hartford	
Abraham Giles	Democratic	1983–1989	Hartford	
María Colón Sánchez	Democratic	1989	Hartford	Died in office in November 1989
Edna Negron Rosario	Democratic	1990–1993	Hartford	First elected in a 1990 special election
John Fonfara	Democratic	1993–1997	Hartford	
Art Feltman	Democratic	1997–2007	Hartford	Did not seek reelection
Hector Luis Robles	Democratic	2007–2012	Hartford	Incumbent
Edwin Vargas	Democratic	2013–present	Hartford	Incumbent

== Recent elections ==
Democratic Primary, August 10, 2010: House District 6
Party	Candidate	Votes	%	±%
Democratic	Hector Luis Robles	946	66.1	
Democratic	Alyssa S. Peterson	486	33.9	
Majority		460	32.1	
Turnout		1,432		

State Election 2008: House District 6
Party	Candidate	Votes	%	±%
Democratic	Hector Luis Robles	4,676	88.7	−5.4
Working Families	Hector Luis Robles	598	11.3	+5.4
Majority		5,274	100.0	+0.0
Turnout		5,274		
Democratic hold		Swing	+0.0	

Democratic Primary, August 12, 2008: House District 6
Party	Candidate	Votes	%	±%
Democratic	Hector Luis Robles	835	53.3	
Democratic	Carmen I. Sierra	731	46.7	
Majority		104	6.6	
Turnout		1,566		

State Election 2006: House District 6
Party	Candidate	Votes	%	±%
Democratic	Arthur J. Feltman	2,410	94.1	+13.7
Working Families	Arthur J. Feltman	151	5.9	+3.7
Majority		2,561	100.0	+37.2
Turnout		2,561		
Democratic hold		Swing	+19.7	

State Election 2004: House District 6
Party	Candidate	Votes	%	±%
Democratic	Arthur J. Feltman	4,077	80.3	−0.1
Republican	Michael R. McKeon	889	17.5	−2.1
Working Families	Kevin L. Lamkins	110	2.2	+2.2
Majority		3,188	62.8	+2.0
Turnout		5,076		
Democratic hold		Swing	-1.1	

Democratic Primary, August 10, 2004: House District 6
Party	Candidate	Votes	%	±%
Democratic	Arthur J. Feltman	856	56.9	
Democratic	Hector Luis Robles	648	43.1	
Majority		208	13.8	
Turnout		1,504		

State Election 2002: House District 6
Party	Candidate	Votes	%	±%
Democratic	Arthur J. Feltman	2,678	80.4	−19.6
Republican	Michael R. McKeon	651	19.6	+19.6
Majority		2,027	60.8	−39.2
Turnout		3,329		
Democratic hold		Swing	-19.6	

State Election 2000: House District 6
Party	Candidate	Votes	%	±%
Democratic	Arthur J. Feltman	3,478	100.0	+23.9
Majority		3,478	100.0	+47.8
Turnout		3,478		
Democratic hold		Swing	+23.9	

State Election 1998: House District 6
Party	Candidate	Votes	%	±%
Democratic	Arthur J. Feltman	2,232	76.1	
Republican	Robert Iacomacci	701	23.9	
Majority		1,531	52.2	
Turnout		2,933		
Democratic hold		Swing		
