= Nixon Jew count =

1971 attempts to demote and remove Jews from the BLS

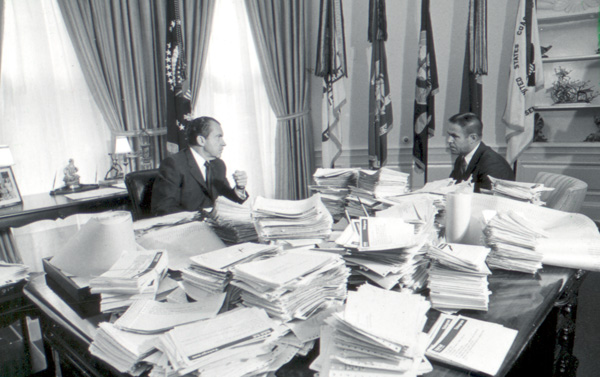
President Richard Nixon and Chief of Staff H. R. Haldeman in 1969

The "Nixon Jew count" of July 1971 is the name given to then-President of the United States Richard Nixon's attempts to demote and remove Jews from the Bureau of Labor Statistics (BLS).

== History ==
In their 1976 book, The Final Days, Bob Woodward and Carl Bernstein suggest President Nixon had a history of antisemitic outbursts and became convinced that Jewish employees of BLS were undermining him by negatively altering labor numbers.

Orchestrated by H. R. Haldeman, Charles Colson, and Fred Malek at Nixon's behest, a list of 13 employees of the BLS with "Jewish-sounding" surnames was drawn up, along with a list of political affiliations. In a letter to Nixon, subsequently referred to as the "Jew-counting" memo, Malek identified 25 Democrats and 13 other employees who "fit the other demographic criterion that was discussed".

The 13 employees considered to be Jewish were demoted and sent to other positions within the United States Department of Labor, where they were deemed to be at lower risk of causing issues to Nixon. In October 1999, the National Archives released tapes from 1971 of Nixon berating Jews, revealing that Nixon said for instance, "Most Jews are disloyal," and "You just have to go down the goddamn list and you know they are out to kill us."

== Reaction ==
When the story was first reported in 1988, Malek resigned from his post as deputy chairman of the Republican National Committee. Malek apologised for his role in the count but denied involvement in the demotion of those identified as Jewish. Jewish leaders including Abraham Foxman and Senator Dianne Feinstein accepted Malek's apologies. Malek remained active in politics after his resignation, later serving as the campaign manager of President George H. W. Bush's re-election campaign in 1992 and the national finance co-chair of Senator John McCain's unsuccessful presidential campaign in 2008.

Writing for Slate in 2011, Timothy Noah described the plan as "the last known act of official anti-Semitism conducted by the United States government".

== See also ==
- Antisemitism in the United States
- Judenzählung
- General Order No. 11 (1862)
