= Edna Negron Rosario =

American educator (born 1944)

Member of the Connecticut House of Representatives from the 6th district
- In office 1990–1993
- Preceded by: María Colón Sánchez
- Succeeded by: John Fonfara

Personal details
- Born: Edna Negron; 1944 (age 81–82) Ciales, Puerto Rico
- Party: Democratic
- Children: 3

Edna Negron Rosario (born 1944) is an American educator and former politician who founded the first family resource center and school-based health clinic in the United States. From 1990 to 1993, she served as a member of the Connecticut House of Representatives, representing the 6th district as a Democrat. She was inducted into the Connecticut Women's Hall of Fame in 1994.

== Early life and education ==
Edna Negron was born in Ciales, Puerto Rico, in 1944 and moved to the United States in 1955. Her family settled in Hartford, Connecticut, where Edna attended Weaver High School. Her father was a chaplain who ministered to migrant workers, and Edna and her siblings often accompanied him on his visits to the tobacco camps in Windsor. She graduated from the Hartford College for Women, then continued her studies at the University of Hartford, where she earned a B.S. degree (summa cum laude) in 1973 and an M.S. degree in 1974.

== Career ==
In 1971, Negron and María Colón Sánchez led the fight for bilingual education in Hartford. Negron began teaching at the Ann Street Bilingual Community School in Hartford in 1974. She served as the coordinator of the Bilingual/Bicultural Education Program for the Hartford public schools for many years. As principal of the Kinsella Elementary School, she renamed the school in honor of Puerto Rican physician and abolitionist Ramón Emeterio Betances, and founded the nation's first family resource center and school-based health clinic. The Family Resource Center at Betances Elementary became a model for social services based in public schools.

Negron served on the board of directors for La Casa de Puerto Rico and was elected its president in 1989. In 1990, following the death of Maria Sanchez, she became the representative for the state's 6th House District and served out the remainder of her term. She has lectured on bilingual education and Puerto Rican history and culture at universities and on radio and television. In 1995, she was featured in the Connecticut Public Television documentary, Puerto Rican Passages.

She has served as vice president for community affairs and corporate giving at Hartford Financial Services Group, and on the state board of trustees overseeing the Hartford public schools. She also founded the mentoring group, El Futuro en Nuestras Manos.

== Awards ==
- Public service award, Connecticut Chapter of the National Organization for Women
- Leadership Recognition Award, Greater Hartford Alumni Associations Community
- Community Service Award, Hartford Hospital
- Achievement Award, Connecticut Hispanic Bar Association
- Honorary doctorate, Trinity College
- Maria C. Sanchez Award, Connecticut Puerto Rican Parade Organization
- Induction into Connecticut Women's Hall of Fame
