= Connecticut's 1st House of Representatives district =

American legislative district

Connecticut's 1st State House of Representatives district
Representative
Matthew Ritter; D–Hartford
- Demographics: 18.2% White; 56.6% Black; 22.9% Hispanic; 4.7% Asian; 2.0% Native American; 0.2% Hawaiian/Pacific Islander

Connecticut's 1st House of Representatives district elects one member of the Connecticut House of Representatives. Its current representative is Matthew Ritter. The district consists of neighborhoods in Hartford, including the neighborhoods of Asylum Hill, West End, and parts of Blue Hills. The district is one of the few in Connecticut to have a Black majority population.

== List of representatives ==
List of representatives from Connecticut's 1st State House district
Representative	Party	Years	District home	Note
James Kennelly	Democratic	1967–1979	Hartford	Seat created. Resigned in 1979.
Mary Ellen Flynn	Democratic	1979–1981	Hartford	Elected in special election
William A. DiBella	Democratic	1981	Hartford	Elected to State Senate in February 1981 special election
Felix Karsky	Democratic	1981–1983	Hartford	Elected in special election
Eric D. Coleman	Democratic	1983–1995	Bloomfield	Elected to State Senate
Kenneth Green	Democratic	1995–2011	Hartford	Defeated in primary
Matthew Ritter	Democratic	2011–	Hartford	

== Recent elections ==
State Election 2010: House District 1
Party	Candidate	Votes	%	±%
Democratic	Matthew Ritter	4,628	90.2	−4.8
Republican	Kenneth Lerman	398	7.8	+7.8
Connecticut for Lieberman	Emanuel L. Blake	56	1.1	−3.9
Independent	Emanuel L. Blake	47	0.9	+0.9
Majority		4,230	82.5	−7.2
Turnout		5,129		
Democratic hold		Swing	-6.3	

Democratic Primary, August 10, 2010: House District 1
Party	Candidate	Votes	%	±%
Democratic	Matthew Ritter	1,153	50.04	
Democratic	Kenneth Green	1,151	49.96	
Majority		2	0.08	
Turnout		2,304		

State Election 2008: House District 1
Party	Candidate	Votes	%	±%
Democratic	Kenneth Green	6,306	95.0	−5.0
Connecticut for Lieberman	Mark A. Friedman	338	5.0	+5.0
Majority		5,968	89.8	−10.2
Turnout		6,644		
Democratic hold		Swing	-5.0	

State Election 2006: House District 1
Party	Candidate	Votes	%	±%
Democratic	Kenneth Green	3,781	100.0	0.0
Majority		3,781	100.0	0.0
Turnout		3,781		
Democratic hold		Swing	0.0	

State Election 2004: House District 1
Party	Candidate	Votes	%	±%
Democratic	Kenneth Green	5,625	100.0	0.0
Majority		5,625	100.0	0.0
Turnout		5,625		
Democratic hold		Swing	0.0	

State Election 2002: House District 1
Party	Candidate	Votes	%	±%
Democratic	Kenneth Green	3,950	100.0	0.0
Majority		3,950	100.0	0.0
Turnout		3,950		
Democratic hold		Swing	0.0	

State Election 2000: House District 1
Party	Candidate	Votes	%	±%
Democratic	Kenneth Green	4,575	100.0	0.0
Majority		4,575	100.0	0.0
Turnout		4,575		
Democratic hold		Swing	0.0	

State Election 1998: House District 1
Party	Candidate	Votes	%	±%
Democratic	Kenneth Green	3,353	100.0	0.0
Majority		3,353	100.0	0.0
Turnout		3,353		
Democratic hold		Swing	0.0	

State Election 1996: House District 1
Party	Candidate	Votes	%	±%
Democratic	Kenneth Green	4,419	100.0	+40.4
Majority		4,575	100.0	+43.5
Turnout		4,575		
Democratic hold		Swing	+21.7	

State Election 1994: House District 1
Party	Candidate	Votes	%	±%
Democratic	Kenneth Green	2,357	59.4	−21.1
Republican	Basil St. George Thomas	862	21.7	+21.7
A Connecticut Party (1990)	Kenneth Green	748	18.9	−0.6
Majority		2,243	56.5	−43.5
Turnout		3,967		
Democratic hold		Swing	-21.5	

State Election 1992: House District 1
Party	Candidate	Votes	%	±%
Democratic	Eric Coleman	4,002	80.5	+12.6
A Connecticut Party (1990)	Kenneth Green	971	19.5	+19.5
Majority		4,973	100.0	+64.2
Turnout		4,973		
Democratic hold		Swing	+32.1	

State Election 1990: House District 1
Party	Candidate	Votes	%	±%
Democratic	Eric Coleman	2,842	67.9	−5.8
Republican	Robert Lutts	1,344	32.1	+5.8
Majority		1,498	35.8	−11.6
Turnout		4,186		
Democratic hold		Swing	-5.8	

State Election 1988: House District 1
Party	Candidate	Votes	%	±%
Democratic	Eric Coleman	4,246	73.7	−26.3
Republican	Robert Lutts	1,515	26.3	+26.3
Majority		2,731	47.4	−52.6
Turnout		5,761		
Democratic hold		Swing	-26.3	

State Election 1986: House District 1
Party	Candidate	Votes	%	±%
Democratic	Eric Coleman	3,383	100.0	+31.2
Majority		3,383	100.0	+62.4
Turnout		3,383		
Democratic hold		Swing	+31.2	

State Election 1984: House District 1
Party	Candidate	Votes	%	±%
Democratic	Eric Coleman	4,521	68.8	+11.4
Republican	Rodney L. Doran	2,050	31.2	−11.4
Majority		2,471	37.6	+22.8
Turnout		6,571		
Democratic hold		Swing	+11.4	

State Election 1982: House District 1
Party	Candidate	Votes	%	±%
Democratic	Eric Coleman	3,224	57.4	−17.7
Republican	Samuel Reed	2,395	42.6	+17.7
Majority		829	14.8	−35.3
Turnout		5,619		
Democratic hold		Swing	-17.7	

State Election 1980: House District 1
Party	Candidate	Votes	%	±%
Democratic	William A. DiBella	4,623	75.1	
Republican	Anthonye S. Esposito	1,536	24.9	
Majority		3,087	50.1	
Turnout		6,159		
Democratic hold		Swing		
