= James Sánchez (politician) =

American politician (born 1961)

Member of the Connecticut House of Representatives from the 6th district
- Incumbent
- Assumed office March 6, 2023
- Preceded by: Edwin Vargas

Personal details
- Born: 1961 (age 64–65)
- Party: Democratic

James Sánchez (born 1961) is an American politician. He was elected to the Connecticut House of Representatives in a special election to represent Connecticut's 6th House of Representatives district for the remainder of Edwin Vargas's term, who had resigned to work at Central Connecticut State University. He previously served on the Hartford city council. He is a member of the Democratic Party.

== Political career ==
Sánchez was elected to the Hartford city council in 2015.

On January 3, 2023, Democrat Edwin Vargas resigned from representing Connecticut's 6th House of Representatives district to pursue an academic post at Central Connecticut State University. Vargas's resignation triggered a special election, which was held on February 28, 2023. Sánchez ran in the special election and defeated independent Jason Diaz, a firefighter, with 62.1% of the vote.

== Electoral history ==
2023 Connecticut's 6th House of Representatives district special election
Party	Candidate	Votes	%
Democratic	James Sánchez	325	62.14%
Independent	Jason Diaz	198	37.86%
Total votes		523	100%
Democratic hold			
