= HCI Equity Partners =

Washington, DC-based private equity firm

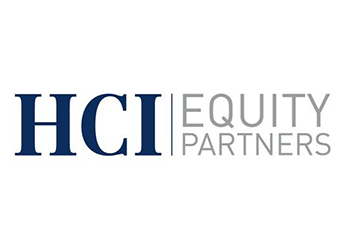
- Type: Limited liability company
- Industry: Private equity
- Founded: 1994; 32 years ago
- Headquarters: Washington, D.C., United States
- Key people: Doug McCormick, Dan Dickinson
- Products: Investments, private equity funds
- Website: http://www.hciequity.com

HCI Equity Partners (formerly Thayer Capital Partners and Thayer Hidden Creek) is a Washington, DC–based private equity firm with an additional office in Chicago, Illinois.

== History ==
=== Thayer Capital Partners ===
The founding date of Thayer Capital Partners has been variously listed as 1991 (PE HUB), 1993 (Washington Post), and 1994 (company website) but sources are consistent that it was founded in Washington, DC. From its founding up to 2004 Thayer invested in over 30 portfolio companies with total revenue in excess of $3 billion. The company was named after Sylvanus Thayer, an early superintendent of the United States Military Academy who is widely considered to be the “Father of West Point.” Thayer's founder, businessman and politician Fred Malek, is a graduate of USMA. After a number of legal and financial incidents in 1999 and 2000 a large number of managing partners left the firm. In 2004 Malek changed his title to "chairman and founder" from "managing partner,” Malek said of the change "I don't intend to just pursue a hobby as a baseball owner. I intend to be chairman and partner of Thayer for the rest of my life.” Thayer Capital Partners was known for using its close political connections to engage in “access capitalism.”

=== Thayer | Hidden Creek ===
Founded in 1989 Hidden Creek Partners was an industrial management company specializing in the automotive sector based in Minneapolis, Minnesota. In 2003 Hidden Creek co-founder Scott Rued joined Thayer as a Managing Partner. In 2004 Hidden Creek became intimately involved in Thayer's operations. Hidden Creek was acquired by Thayer Capital Partners in 2005. As part of the deal the firm changed its name to Thayer | Hidden Creek and Hidden Creek Partners co-founder, president and CEO, Scott Rued became a managing partner.

=== HCI Equity Partners ===
In 2011 the "Managing Partners and investment team” of Thayer Hidden Creek formed HCI Equity Partners "to assume the management of the funds and operations of Thayer | Hidden Creek Partners.”

== Current operations ==
In 2017 HCI Equity Partners closed a new $400M fund, Fund V. The fund has an activation date of January 2018. In December 2018 HCI Equity Partners V acquired the Liverpool, New York–based hose assembly firm JGB Enterprises which specializes in supporting the fracking industry. In 2018 it was reported that HCI’s portfolio was 60% Industrial and 40% Transportation & Logistics.

=== Major positions ===
- JGB Enterprises (Liverpool, New York)
- Tech24 (Greenville, South Carolina)
- AmerCareRoyal (Exton, Pennsylvania)
- MSI Express (Portage, Indiana)

== Controversies and legal issues ==
=== Involvement in Connecticut political corruption ===
In 2004 the US Securities and Exchange Commission filed a complaint against Thayer for their role in the racketeering case of former Treasurer of the State of Connecticut Paul J. Silvester. The SEC report says that in November 1998 Silvester requested that Thayer's chairman, Frederic V. Malek, hire his good friend William DiBella as a lobbyist. DiBella was paid 0.7% of the value of any investment the Connecticut State Retirement and Trust Fund placed with Thayer, this amounted to $374,500 over the course of the scheme. The SEC contended that DiBella "ultimately performed no meaningful services in connection with the Thayer IV investment and Thayer, TC Partners IV, TC Management IV, and Malek failed to take adequate steps to determine what services, if any, the Treasurer's Associate would, or actually did, perform in connection with that investment." According to The New York Times in 1999 Silvester "pleaded guilty to six acts of racketeering, including three instances of bribery and one count of conspiring to launder money” and agreed to cooperate with federal investigators in their case against DeBella and Thayer.

On May 18, 2007, a federal jury found DiBella and his business North Cove Ventures "liable for aiding and abetting Silvester's intentional violations of Section 10(b) of the Securities Exchange Act of 1934 and Rule 10b-5 thereunder, and the negligent violations by Malek, Thayer and its affiliates of Section 206(2) of the Investment Advisers Act of 1940. In its decision of March 13, 2008, the court reaffirmed the jury's findings."

=== Roadrunner Transportation ===
Thayer acquired shipping firm Roadrunner Transportation in 2005. Thayer initially shot for a 2008 public offering but reconsidered due to the general economic condition. In 2010 they took Roadrunner public and the firm continued to sell off its shares, in 2015 they sold 2 million shares worth $49,500,000. In 2018 two former Roadrunner Transportation controllers were indicted on charges of securities and accounting fraud occurring between 2014 and 2017 which caused alleged damages of over 245 million USD to buyers of Roadrunner Transportation stock.

=== Tribar PFAS pollution ===
In 2015 HCI Equity Partners acquired Michigan auto parts supplier Tribar Manufacturing. in 2018 Michigan regulators took action against Tribar for violating water pollution statutes. The pollution set a new record of 5,500 parts per trillion of PFAS, recorded in Norton Creek, well over the regulated level of under 12 parts per trillion. Fish in "Kent Lake; the Huron River; Hubbell Pond in Oakland County; and Ore, Strawberry, Zukey, Gallagher, Loon, Whitewood, Base Line, and Portage Lakes in Livingston County.” were found to be far too contaminated for human consumption and as such the state issued a fish advisory for these areas. Tribar also operates in the area as Adept Plastic Finishing Inc. which was acquired by HCI in 2016. Officials noted that the companies had already ceased use of PFAS but that the pollutant remained in their system because it is highly persistent, which is one reason it is so damaging to the environment.

=== 2022 Tribar Hexvalent Chromium Spill ===
On August 1, 2022, EGLE (Environment, Great Lakes, and Energy) was notified by Tribar that it had released several thousand gallons of a liquid containing 5% hexavalent chromium into the sewer system. Hexavalent chromium was discharged to a sanitary sewer system from Tribar over the weekend and routed to the Wixom wastewater treatment facility. The chemical is a known carcinogen that can cause several adverse health effects through ingestion, skin contact or inhalation.

== Investors ==
In 2011 investors included Boeing, Hamilton Lane, and the Michigan Department of Treasury.

== People ==
- Ivor J. Evans – Vice Chairman of Union Pacific, 2004–05
- James J. Forese – CEO of Ikon, 1998–2002
- Fred Malek – Co-chairman, John McCain national finance committee
- Paul G. Stern – CEO of Northern Telecom, 1989–1993
- William Cohen – US Secretary of Defense, 1997-2001
- Richard K. Davidson – CEO of Union Pacific, 1991–2006
- Donald V. Fites – CEO of Caterpillar, 1990–1999
- Daniel A. Dickinson – Director, Caterpillar
- Roger Penske – automotive executive
- Dan Altobello – Former Chairman of the Board, Onex Food Services, Inc.
- Norman Ralph Augustine – Former Chairman and CEO of Lockheed Martin Corporation
- Nick Chabraja – Chairman and CEO of General Dynamics
- Bob Eaton – Chairman and CEO of Chrysler Corporation
- Jack Kemp – former U.S. Representative, former Secretary of Housing and Urban Development
