= Responsiveness Program =

US presidential re-election strategy

The Responsiveness Program, established in 1972 during the first presidency of Richard M. Nixon, was a broad strategy to politicize the executive branch and use the power and resources of incumbency to ensure Nixon's re-election. The program included plans to "redirect federal funds to specific Administration supporters" and to "shape legal and regulatory action to enhance campaign goals." Outlined by Fred Malek in a memorandum to H.R. Haldeman on March 17, 1972, a comprehensive plan detailed how the resources and staff of the federal bureaucracy could be used to serve partisan objectives.

Efforts were made to prevent the Responsiveness Program strategy from being associated with the White House staff or to President Nixon. In a memo to Haldeman dated December 23, 1971, Malek wrote:

Naturally, carrying out this program, even if done discreetly, will represent a substantial risk. Trying to pressure 'non-political' civil servants to partisanly support the President's re-election would become quickly publicized and undoubtedly backfire. Consequently, the strategy should be to work through the top and medium-level political appointees who exercise control over most of the Departmental decisions and actions. Also, to minimize any direct links to the President, there should be no directions on this project in writing, and most of the initiative should come from the Department Heads themselves. (In fact, as this concept is refined further, I propose we stop calling it 'politicizing the Executive Branch,' and instead call it something like strengthening the Government responsiveness.)"

After interviewing over 150 witnesses and reviewing thousands of documents, the Senate Watergate Committee found evidence that through the Responsiveness Program:

1. funds for "grants, contract, loans, and subsidies" were illegally rechannelled to further re-election;
2. government benefits were illegally offered in exchange for political support;
3. campaign contributions were illegally solicited from beneficiaries of minority contracts;
4. the White House was engaged with the Committee to Re-elect the President in a program to act through "special personnel referral units" to stack civil service positions with Nixon loyalists.

Though the Committee found evidence of obfuscation, destruction of documents, and removal of White House files relevant to the program and recommended prosecution, the Watergate Special Prosecution Force declined to file criminal charges.
