= Julio Concepcion =

American politician

Member of the Connecticut House of Representatives from the 4th district
- Incumbent
- Assumed office June 12, 2018
- Preceded by: Angel Arce

Personal details
- Born: September 8, 1982 (age 43) Puerto Rico
- Party: Democratic
- Education: University of Connecticut (BA)

Julio A. Concepcion (born September 8, 1982) is an American politician serving as a member of the Connecticut House of Representatives from the 4th district, comprising parts of Hartford, Connecticut, since June of 2018. In the legislature, He serves as the House Chair of the Executive and Legislative Nominations Committee, and as a member on the Finance, Revenue and Bonding, and Transportation Committees.

== Early life and education ==
Concepcion was born in Puerto Rico and raised in East Hartford, Connecticut. He attended East Hartford High School, where he was class president and became interested in politics. In 2004, he earned a Bachelor's in political science from the University of Connecticut, and settled in Hartford, where he lives with his wife and daughter. In 2005, he began working as a community liaison and assistant for Mayor Eddie Perez. He then served as a Vice President of the MetroHartford Alliance, a group that advocates for Hartford's small business community, before becoming the Executive Director of the Hartford Chamber of Commerce in 2018.

== Political career ==
Concepcion started his political involvement in 2010, getting elected as a member of Hartford's Democratic Town Committee. In 2015, he was elected to Hartford's City Council, where he was elected as the Majority Leader. In 2018, Concepcion ran in the special election for Connecticut's 4th House of Representatives district following the resignation of incumbent Angel Acre, who had exchanged inappropriate texts with a teenaged girl. Concepcion earned nearly 65% of the vote, defeating petitioning Democrat Jessica Inacio and Republican Bryan Nelson, and assumed the office on June 12th, 2018.
