= James Kennelly =

American politician (died 1995)

Speaker of the Connecticut House of Representatives
- In office 1975–1979
- Preceded by: Francis J. Collins
- Succeeded by: Ernest N. Abate

Member of the Connecticut House of Representatives from the 1st district
- In office 1967–1979
- Preceded by: Seat established
- Succeeded by: Mary Ellen Flynn

Personal details
- Born: 1930 or 1931
- Died: October 11, 1995 (aged 64) Farmington, Connecticut, U.S.
- Party: Democratic
- Spouse: Barbara Kennelly
- Children: 4
- Education: College of the Holy Cross; University of Connecticut School of Law

James J. Kennelly (1930 or 1931 – October 11, 1995) was an American politician who served in the Connecticut House of Representatives from 1967 to 1979, representing the 1st district as a Democrat. He was speaker of the House from 1975 to 1979.

== Personal life ==
James J. Kennelly was born in 1930 or 1931. He grew up in Hartford, Connecticut, and graduated from the College of the Holy Cross and the University of Connecticut School of Law. He began practicing law in 1959. On September 26, 1959, he married Barbara Kennelly, who served as secretary of the state of Connecticut and later as a U.S. representative. They had four children together.

== Career ==
A Democrat, Kennelly represented the 1st district of the Connecticut House of Representatives from 1967 to his resignation in 1979. From 1975 to 1979, Kennelly served as speaker of the House. Mary Ellen Flynn succeeded Kennelly as the representative from the 1st district in November 1979.

== Death ==
Kennelly died on October 11, 1995, at John Dempsey Hospital in Farmington, Connecticut. He was 64.
