= Felix Karsky =

American politician (1933–2017)

Member of the Connecticut House of Representatives from the 4th district
- In office 1983–1987
- Preceded by: Abraham Giles
- Succeeded by: John Fonfara

Member of the Connecticut House of Representatives from the 1st district
- In office 1981–1983
- Preceded by: William A. DiBella
- Succeeded by: Eric D. Coleman

Personal details
- Born: March 24, 1933 Hartford, Connecticut, U.S.
- Died: May 31, 2017 (aged 84) Vero Beach, Florida, U.S.
- Party: Democratic
- Spouse: Edith Pollock Karsky (m. 1988)
- Education: Trinity College

Felix G. Karsky (March 24, 1933 – May 31, 2017) was an American politician who served in the Connecticut House of Representatives as a Democrat. From 1981 to 1983, he represented the 1st district, and from 1983 to 1987, the 4th district.

== Personal life ==
Karsky was born on March 24, 1933, in Hartford, Connecticut. He graduated from Bulkeley High School and later from Trinity College. After college, he became a teacher and sports coach at Bulkeley High School, where he worked for over 40 years before retiring in 1996. He married Edith Pollock Karsky in 1988.

== Political career ==
Karsky was first elected to the Connecticut House of Representatives in an April 1981 special election after his predecessor, William A. DiBella, won a special election to the State Senate. Karsky represented the 1st district until 1983, when he became the representative for the 4th district. He served two terms and did not run for reelection in 1986.

== Death ==
Karsky died on May 31, 2017, in Vero Beach, Florida. He was 84.
