= Edwin Vargas =

American politician (born 1949)

Member of the Connecticut House of Representatives from the 6th district
- In office January 9, 2013 – January 3, 2023
- Preceded by: Hector Robles
- Succeeded by: James Sánchez

Personal details
- Born: January 4, 1949 (age 77) New York City, U.S.
- Party: Democratic

Edwin Vargas Jr. (born January 4, 1949) is an American politician who served in the Connecticut House of Representatives from the 6th district in 2013. Before his election to the state house, Vargas made numerous runs for local office in Connecticut, stretching back to 1977, which mainly focused around the themes of public education, organized labor, and the preservation and empowerment of ethnic and national cultures. He was especially outspoken on the lack of Puerto Rican and Hispanic representation in politics.

Vargas held various leadership positions throughout his career. He led the Hartford Federation of Teachers, the Hartford Democratic Party, the regional AFL-CIO and numerous state and national posts. After retiring in 2023 as a Deputy Speaker from the Connecticut House of Representatives he accepted the Gov. O’Neill Endowed Chairmanship and a faculty position in the Political Science Department of Central Connecticut University. He continues to serve there in an emeritus capacity. Vargas and his wife Sylvia, a retired Hartford educator continue to reside in the city. They have two adult sons, Edwin III and Daniel, six grandchildren and four great-grandchildren.

Central Connecticut State University.
