= Art Feltman =

American politician

Arthur J. Feltman

Member of the Connecticut House of Representatives from the 6th district
- In office January 1997 – January 2009
- Preceded by: John Fonfara
- Succeeded by: Hector Robles

Personal details
- Born: March 10, 1958 (age 68) Paterson, New Jersey, U.S.
- Party: Democratic

Arthur J. Feltman, commonly known as Art Feltman, is an American politician from the state of Connecticut. A Democrat, he served for 12 years as a member of the Connecticut House of Representatives, representing the 6th District in Hartford. First elected in 1996, he was not a candidate for re-election in 2008 and left office in January 2009.

== Biography ==
Educated at Wesleyan University (B.A., 1980) and the University of Connecticut (J.D., 1987), Feltman is a lawyer. He was elected to the House of Representatives in 1996, after serving one year on the Hartford City Council. Prior to that, he had spent three years as commissioner of the city's redevelopment agency and eleven years on the Democratic town committee.

In the legislature, he served as chair of the planning and development committee, also serving on the appropriations and education committees.

Feltman is openly gay.

He ran unsuccessfully for mayor of Hartford in 2007.
