= Connecticut's 1st State Senate district =

American legislative district

Senator
John Fonfara; D

Connecticut's 1st State Senate district elects one member of the Connecticut State Senate. The district encompasses parts of Hartford and Wethersfield. It is currently represented by Democrat John Fonfara, who has served since 1997.

== Recent elections ==
=== 2026 ===
2026 Connecticut State Senate election, District 1
Party	Candidate	Votes	%
Democratic	John Fonfara (Incumbent)	TBD	TBD
	Total Votes	TBD	TBD
Results: TBD	Winner: TBD	TBD	TBD

=== 2024 ===
2024 Connecticut State Senate election, District 1
Party	Candidate	Votes	%
Democratic	John Fonfara (Incumbent)	18,512	87.3
Green	Luis Delgado	2,696	12.7
	Total Votes	21,208	100.0
Democratic Hold	Winner: John Fonfara (Incumbent)	18,512	87.3

=== 2022 ===
2022 Connecticut State Senate election, District 1
Party	Candidate	Votes	%
Democratic	John Fonfara (Incumbent)	11,579	68.2
Republican	Alex Colaiacovo	4,893	28.8
Green	Micheal Oretade	318	1.9
Independent Party	Alyssa Peterson	191	1.1
	Total Votes	16,981	100.0
Democratic Hold	Winner: John Fonfara (Incumbent)	11,579	68.2

=== 2020 ===
2020 Connecticut State Senate election, District 1
Party	Candidate	Votes	%
Democratic	John Fonfara (incumbent)	20,584	71.78
Republican	Barbara Ruhe	7,141	24.90
Green	Mary L. Sanders	952	3.32
Total votes		28,677	100.00
Democratic hold			

=== 2018 ===
2018 Connecticut State Senate election, District 1
Party	Candidate	Votes	%
Democratic	John Fonfara (incumbent)	15,612	74.0
Republican	Barbara Ruhe	5,044	23.9
Green	Barbara Barry	447	2.1
Total votes		21,103	100.0
Democratic hold			

=== 2016 ===
2016 Connecticut State Senate election, District 1
Party	Candidate	Votes	%
Democratic	John Fonfara (incumbent)	20,473	74.81
Republican	Barbara Ruhe	6,052	22.15
Green	Barbara Barry	829	3.03
Total votes		27,318	100.0
Democratic hold			

=== 2014 ===
2016 Connecticut State Senate election, District 1
Party	Candidate	Votes	%
Democratic	John Fonfara (incumbent)	11,908	72
Republican	Barbara Ruhe	4,135	25
Green	Barbara Barry	335	2
Unaffiliated	Alyssa S. Peterson	156	0.9
Total votes		16,534	100.0
Democratic hold			

=== 2012 ===
2016 Connecticut State Senate election, District 1
Party	Candidate	Votes	%
Democratic	John Fonfara (incumbent)	20,648	80.7
Republican	Barbara Ruhe	4,447	17.4
Green	Jeffrey Russell	488	1.9
Total votes		25,583	100.0
Democratic hold			
