= Abraham Giles =

American politician

Member of the Connecticut House of Representatives from the 6th district
- In office January 5, 1983 – January 4, 1989
- Preceded by: Thomas D. Ritter
- Succeeded by: María Colón Sánchez

Member of the Connecticut House of Representatives from the 4th district
- In office January 3, 1973 – January 5, 1983
- Preceded by: Paul A. LaRosa
- Succeeded by: Felix Karsky

Personal details
- Born: June 21, 1926 Jenkins County, Georgia
- Died: March 26, 2011 (aged 84) Hartford, Connecticut
- Party: Democratic

Abraham Giles (June 21, 1926 – March 26, 2011) was an American politician who served in the Connecticut House of Representatives from 1973 to 1989.

He died of pneumonia on March 26, 2011, in Hartford, Connecticut at age 84.
