= Kenneth Przybysz =

American politician (born c. 1947)

Kenneth L. Przybysz (born c. 1947) is an American politician.

Przybysz served two terms each in the Connecticut House of Representatives and the Connecticut Senate, a total of four terms and twelve years in the Connecticut Legislature, until losing a September 1994 Democratic Party primary for the Connecticut Senate to Edith Prague. After losing the primary, Przybysz ran in the general election as a candidate of A Connecticut Party. He later became a lobbyist.

Connecticut House of Representatives
Preceded by Joseph A. Broder	Member of the Connecticut House of Representatives from the 48th district 1983–1987	Succeeded by Andrew McCall Norton
Connecticut State Senate
Preceded by Eric H. Benson	Member of the Connecticut State Senate from the 19th district 1987–1995	Succeeded by Edith Prague
