= Peter Nystrom =

American politician (born 1957)

Mayor of Norwich
- In office December 5, 2017 – December 5, 2025
- Preceded by: Deberey A. Hinchey
- Succeeded by: Swarnjit Singh
- In office December 1, 2009 – December 2013
- Preceded by: Benjamin P. Lathrop
- Succeeded by: Deberey A. Hinchey

Member of the Norwich City Council
- In office 2015 – December 4, 2017
- In office 2009 – December 1, 2009
- In office 1979–1984

Member of the Connecticut House of Representatives from the 46th district
- In office 1984–2002
- Preceded by: Thomas Sweeney
- Succeeded by: Melissa Olson Riley

Personal details
- Born: February 13, 1957 (age 69)
- Party: Republican
- Education: Eastern Connecticut State College (BS); University of Connecticut (MA)

Peter A. Nystrom (born February 13, 1957) is an American politician. He was a member of the Norwich City Council from 1979 to 1984, when he won his first election to the Connecticut House of Representatives. Nystrom served as a state representative until 2002. That year, he ran unsuccessfully for seat on the Connecticut Senate. In 2009, Nystrom returned to the Norwich City Council via a special election and won the mayoralty later that year. He relinquished the mayoralty in 2013, began a third stint on the city council in 2015, and was elected to consecutive mayoral terms in 2017 and 2021. In 2021, he announced it would be his final run for mayor.

== Career ==
Nystrom attended Eastern Connecticut State College, and competed for the school's track and cross country teams. Nystrom completed a Bachelor of Science in education at Eastern Connecticut State College in 1979 and a Master of Arts in education at the University of Connecticut in 1986. Outside of politics, Nystrom drove for the United Parcel Service for 24 years.

A Republican, Nystrom contested his first election at the age of 22, winning a seat on the Norwich City Council in 1979. After five years as a city councilor, Nystrom defeated nine-term Democratic incumbent Thomas Sweeney in the 46th district of the Connecticut House of Representatives. Nystrom's tenure as a state representative lasted 18 years. in 2002, he lost to incumbent Edith Prague of the Connecticut Senate's 19th district. During the campaign, Nystrom debated Prague on health-related issues. Nystrom won a special election in 2009, returning to the Norwich City Council. That November, he defeated Mark Bettencourt to win the mayoralty. In 2013, Nystrom lost reelection to Deberey Hinchey, the first woman mayor in Norwich history. Nystrom contested the 2015 city council election, and won, subsequently assuming the office of council president pro tempore. He was one of five candidates to declare interest in running for the mayoralty in 2017, and eventually won 57 percent of the vote to defeat Democrat Derell Wilson. Nystrom announced in March 2021 that he would run for a third and final mayoral term. Nystrom defeated Mark Bettencourt, his opponent in 2009, to retain the mayoralty.
