= Nicholas Pavia =

American politician

Nicholas Pavia is an American politician.

He won a special election in January 1988 as a Republican candidate for Connecticut's 145th House of Representatives district against Democratic candidate Theresa Carlucci. Pavia lost his bid to retain the seat in the general election held in November of that year, and was succeeded in office by Christel Truglia. In 1992, Pavia faced incumbent George Jepsen of Connecticut's 27th State Senate District, and lost. He later served on the city council of Stamford, Connecticut and worked in the maintenance department at Stamford Hospital, then became a priest.

Connecticut House of Representatives
Preceded by Richard Blumenthal	Member of the Connecticut House of Representatives from the 145th district 1988–1989	Succeeded by Christel Truglia
