= Richard Cunningham (American politician) =

American politician (c. 1944–2021)

Member of the Connecticut Senate from the 27th district
- In office 1979–1981
- Preceded by: William E. Strada Jr.
- Succeeded by: Thom Serrani

Member of the Connecticut House of Representatives from the 148th district
- In office 1985–1987
- Preceded by: Paul Esposito
- Succeeded by: George Jepsen

Personal details
- Died: July 4, 2021 (aged 77)
- Party: Democratic
- Education: Massachusetts Institute of Technology; Duke Law School

Richard Henry Gillespie Cunningham III (c. 1944 – July 4, 2021) was an American lawyer and politician.

Cunningham's ancestry could be traced back to passengers of the Mayflower. He was born in Brooklyn, New York to parents Frederick William Cunningham and Anna Bent Cunningham and raised in Stamford, Connecticut. Cunningham graduated from Stamford High School in 1962, earned a Bachelor of Science in political science from the Massachusetts Institute of Technology in 1967, alongside a minor in mechanical engineering. He completed his legal studies at Duke Law School in 1970, and began practicing law in Stamford later that year. Between 1971 and 1977, Cunningham was a reservist in the United States Army, assigned to the 399th Civil Affairs Group with the rank of captain. He won election to the Connecticut Senate as a Republican in 1978, defeating 27th district incumbent William Strada. Cunningham lost the seat to Thom Serrani in 1980. The next year, Cunningham defeated incumbent Paul Esposito in a Connecticut House of Representatives election for the 148th district. Cunningham died on July 4, 2021, aged 77.
