= Jonathan Jacobson (Connecticut politician) =

American politician

Member of the Connecticut House of Representatives from the 148th district
- Incumbent
- Assumed office January 8, 2025
- Preceded by: Anabel Figueroa

Personal details
- Born: 1988 (age 37–38)
- Party: Democratic Party
- Education: Hofstra University; Quinnipiac University School of Law
- Website: https://www.jacobsonforct.com/

Jonathan Jacobson is an American politician and member of the Connecticut House of Representatives since 2024 from the 148th district, which contains parts of Stamford.

Jacobson is Jewish.
