= Thomas Sweeney (Connecticut politician) =

American politician (1933–2007)

Member of the Connecticut House of Representatives from the 60th district
- In office 1967–1973
- Preceded by: Seat created
- Succeeded by: Cornelius O'Leary

Member of the Connecticut House of Representatives from the 46th district
- In office 1973–1985
- Preceded by: Thomas J. Donnelly
- Succeeded by: Peter Nystrom

Personal details
- Born: May 10, 1933 Norwich, Connecticut, U.S.
- Died: February 5, 2007 (aged 73)
- Party: Democratic
- Children: 4

Military service
- Branch/service: United States Marine Corps

Thomas F. Sweeney (May 10, 1933 – February 5, 2007) was an American Democratic politician who served in the Connecticut House of Representatives. From 1967 to 1973, he represented the 60th district, and from 1973 to 1985, he represented the 46th district.

== Personal life ==
Sweeney was born in Norwich, Connecticut, on May 10, 1933, to parents Thomas P. Sweeney and Jane P. Toomey Sweeney. He served in the United States Marine Corps during the Korean War. Sweeney had four daughters.

Sweeney died of cancer on February 5, 2007. He was 73.

== Political career ==
Sweeney was first elected to the Connecticut House of Representatives in 1966, and he served three terms representing the 60th district as a Democrat. He left office in 1973, following his election to the 46th district. Sweeney represented the 46th district for six terms and ran for reelection in 1984, but was defeated by Republican candidate Peter Nystrom. He left office in 1985.

Sweeney also worked for Connecticut's Department of Labor Mediation and Arbitration.
