= Daniel J. Fox =

American politician

Member of the Connecticut House of Representatives from the 148th district
- In office 2011–2023
- Preceded by: Carlo Leone
- Succeeded by: Anabel Figueroa

Personal details
- Party: Democratic

Daniel J. Fox is an American politician and lawyer who is a judge in the Danbury district of the Connecticut Superior Court as of September 2023. Previously he served in the Connecticut House of Representatives from 2011 to 2022 as a State Representative from the 148th District, which encompasses the East Side of Stamford, Connecticut.

Fox was first elected to the Connecticut House in 2011 in a special election in order to replace Carlo Leone. Fox was re-elected in 2012, 2014, 2016, 2018, and 2020. Fox served as the assistant Majority Whip of the House and also has served on the House Judiciary committee.

Fox was reelected to the Connecticut House in 2022 but did not take the oath of office, in anticipation of being nominated to the Superior Court. He was nominated to the Superior Court by Governor Ned Lamont in March 2023.
