= Anabel Figueroa =

Member of the Connecticut House of Representatives

Member of the Connecticut House of Representatives from the 148th district
- In office March 6, 2023 – January 8, 2025
- Preceded by: Daniel J. Fox
- Succeeded by: Jonathan Jacobson

Personal details
- Born: Tonacatepeque, El Salvador
- Party: Democratic
- Spouse: Married 1986
- Children: 2
- Education: Norwalk Community College
- Occupation: Unit secretary

Anabel D. Figueroa is a Salvadoran American politician serving the 148th District in the Connecticut House of Representatives from 2023 to 2025, and on the Stamford Board of Representatives since 2001.

== Career ==
=== Politics ===
==== Local politics ====
Figueroa has served on Stamford's Board of Representatives since 2001, representing District 8.

In 2017, she joined a slate of Democratic candidates on the Board of Representatives call "Reform Stamford", promising to provide more checks on the city's Mayor.

During her time on the Board of Representatives, Figueroa has been subject to two ethics investigations: in 2019, she was subject to an inquiry regarding her vote on nominating the city's Police Chief, due to her husband and son both being affiliated with the Police Department; in 2021, she was subject to a second inquiry regarding her vote on the reappointment of one of the members of the city's Board of Ethics members who had previously been involved in the first investigation against her.

==== Connecticut House of Representatives ====
In January 2023, Daniel J. Fox, the Representative for the 148th District of the Connecticut House of Representatives, resigned. Figueroa subsequently launched a campaign for his former seat. In the Democratic primary for the seat, Figueroa ran against former Board of Representatives member Jonathan Jacobson. Figueroa won the Democratic Party's endorsement for the seat the prior month by a vote of 4-3, which she controversially won by casting the tie-breaking vote for herself. Her decision to not recuse herself from the vote drew criticism from her opponent, and the Chair of Stamford's Democratic City Committee.

In February 2023, Figueroa was elected to the 148th District of the Connecticut House of Representatives, defeating Republican Olga Anastos.

Figueroa ran for re-election for this seat in November 2024, during the general election. She faced Jonathan Jacobson in the Democratic party primary, held in August 2024. Following a Democratic City Committee election in March 2024, in which the slate Figueroa aligned herself lost, the Democratic Party endorsed her opponent, Jacobson. On the date of the primary, August 13, the Democratic City Committee Executive Board called on her to resign for comments she made in late July, where she said "The Hispanic vote is going to determine on August 13th who will win to represent or who will continue to represent you. We cannot permit a person who is of Jewish origin, of Jewish origin, to represent our community.", in reference to Jacobson. On the afternoon of August 13, Figueroa offered an apology that was deemed insufficient by many of Jacobson's supporters, and later apologized again. Unofficial results released that night showed Figueroa losing to Jacobson, 37.4% to 62.6%. Following the controversy, amid pressure from other members of the Board of Representatives, Figueroa announced she would resign from the Board of Representatives on August 16. However, ten days later, she rescinded her resignation letter.

==== Electoral history ====
Figueroa was elected in the special election for the 148th District on February 28, 2023, winning 61.0% of the vote, versus the 39.0% won by Republican candidate Olga Dimitria Anastos.

Unofficial results from the Democratic primary held on August 13, 2024 showed Figueroa losing to Jacobson, 37.4% to 62.6%.

=== Health worker ===
Figueroa worked at Norwalk Hospital as a unit coordinator, and is the president of Connecticut Healthcare Associates Local 1213. As of August 16, 2024, she is no longer employed by Norwalk Hospital.

== Political positions ==
Anabel Figueroa has opposed abortions on demand, and spoke at an anti-abortion rally where she said "Latinas don't really look for abortions". Figueroa has voted against a bill to provide legal protection to Connecticut medical personnel who perform abortions from criminal prosecution, and to require public higher education institutions to create plans to provide students with reproductive health services.

Figueroa has supported the use of the term "Latine", as opposed to "Latinx", as a gender-neutral term for the Latin American community, and voted in favor of a bill to require state agencies to use the term.

Figueroa voted for a bill to expand Connecticut's paid sick leave, as well as a bill requiring lactation consultants be licensed.

She has said she supports a constitutional amendment enabling judges to deny bail based on perceived risk.

=== Antisemitic remarks ===
On July 28, 2024, while in a primary race against Jonathan Jacobson, who is Jewish, Figueroa said "The Hispanic vote is going to determine on August 13th who will win to represent or who will continue to represent you. We cannot permit a person who is of Jewish origin, of Jewish origin, to represent our community". Following this resurfacing of this video on August 13, the date of the primary vote, the Stamford Democratic City Committee Executive Board asked her to resign. This video surfaced immediately after one of her supporters, fellow Democratic City Committee member Eva Padilla, had referred to Jacobson in a Facebook post as "the Israeli lawyer," leading to condemnation from the Democratic City Committee. Later on August 13, she released a statement apologizing for the remarks, but added "My message is that we need leaders who represent our districts. There is almost no Latino representation in Hartford, and I am currently the only Latina state representative in southern Connecticut. There is a strong Latino community in the 148th district, and I will ensure their voice is at the table and never leaves it. This has nothing to do with religion, and as a bilingual speaker, I misspoke when describing my opponent's background". Following a tense back-and-forth with Jacobson and his supporters at Stamford High School, Figueroa apologized again. When she asked how to "remedy what I have said", Jacobson told her to step down from her three elected roles, to which Figueroa said "that is not going to happen". After significant pressure from other representatives, Figueroa announced she would resign from the Board of Representatives on August 16. However, ten days later, she rescinded her resignation letter.

== Personal life ==
Figueroa was born in Tonacatepeque and founded the American Red Cross chapter there. She also taught elementary school in the country. Figueroa has lived in Stamford, Connecticut since 1983. She studied at Norwalk Community College to become a therapeutic recreation director and a certified nursing assistant.
