= Peggy Sayers =

American politician (born 1941)

Member of the Connecticut House of Representatives from the 60th district
- In office January 6, 1999 – January 4, 2017
- Preceded by: Carl Schiessl
- Succeeded by: Scott Storms

Personal details
- Born: October 16, 1941 (age 84) Springfield, Massachusetts, U.S.
- Party: Democratic

Peggy Sayers (born October 16, 1941) is an American politician who served in the Connecticut House of Representatives from the 60th district from 1999 to 2017.
