= Christel Truglia =

American politician (1936–2025)

Member of the Connecticut House of Representatives from the 145th district
- In office 1988–2008
- Preceded by: Nicholas Pavia
- Succeeded by: Patricia B. Miller

Personal details
- Born: Christel Heidemann; February 16, 1936 Schötmar, Germany
- Died: July 13, 2025 (aged 89)
- Party: Democratic
- Spouse: Anthony Truglia Sr.
- Children: 3, Sallyanne Truglia, Anthony Truglia Jr., Penny Truglia

Christel Truglia (née Heidemann, February 16, 1936 – July 13, 2025) was an American politician who was a member of Connecticut's 145th assembly district, representing the Democratic Party.

== Early life ==
Christel Truglia was born in Schötmar, a quarter of Bad Salzuflen in present-day North Rhine-Westphalia, during the years before World War II. Her mother was an American who traveled to Germany and later married a German headwaiter, Christel's father. They married and had five children, Christel, her three sisters, and one brother. When Christel was three, Germany invaded Poland, sparking World War II in Europe. Years later, when other countries began bombing Europe, one was dropped on the house next door to Christel's home. It did not go off, but her family had to move into a smaller home. At the age of eight, her father died, and three years later, Christel and her family traveled from Germany to Darien, Connecticut where Christel attended Darien public schools. She received a high school diploma, but did not take her education further.

== Political career ==
Truglia was elected into office as a state representative in 1988, where she remained undefeated during elections for the two decades during which she held office. As a state representative, Christel was appointed to be the assistant Majority Leader. Truglia was also placed on several legislative committees such as the Appropriations Committee, Human Services Committee, and the Select Committee on Children.

== Community service ==
Truglia's work centered heavily, but did not exclusively include, children. In 1996, Christel founded the Truglia Thumbelina Fund in efforts of helping children in Stamford. She also established a toy closet in 2005 called "David's Treasure Tree Toy Closet" (in memory of a boy named David who died of leukemia at a young age) for children who visit Stamford Hospital in Stamford, Connecticut.

== Personal life and death ==
Christel worked for an insurance company after graduating from high school; she also joined a choir at a local church. During her time with this church, she met and subsequently married the church's organist, Anthony Truglia. Christel and Anthony had three children, Sallyanne, Anthony Jr., and Penny.

Truglia died on July 13, 2025, at the age of 89.
