= Joyce Wojtas =

American politician

Member of the Connecticut House of Representatives from the 60th district
- In office 1977–1981
- Preceded by: Cornelius O'Leary
- Succeeded by: David J. Wenc

Personal details
- Party: Democratic

Joyce A. Wojtas is an American politician who served in the Connecticut House of Representatives from 1977 to 1981, representing the 60th district as a Democrat. She lived in Windsor Locks during her tenure.
