= Connecticut's 60th House of Representatives district =

American legislative district

Connecticut's 60th State House of Representatives district
Representative
| Jane Garibay; D |

Connecticut's 60th House of Representatives district elects one member of the Connecticut House of Representatives. It consists of the town of Windsor Locks and part of Windsor and has been represented by Democrat Jane Garibay since 2017.

== List of representatives ==
List of representatives from Connecticut's 60th State House district
| Representative | Party | Years | District home | Note |
|---|---|---|---|---|
| Thomas Sweeney | Democratic | 1967–1973 | Norwich | Seat created |
| Cornelius O'Leary | Democratic | 1973–1977 | Windsor Locks | |
| Joyce Wojtas | Democratic | 1977–1981 | Windsor Locks | |
| David J. Wenc | Democratic | 1981–1987 | Windsor Locks | |
| Carl Schiessl | Democratic | 1987–1999 | Windsor Locks | |
| Peggy Sayers | Democratic | 1999–2017 | Windsor Locks | |
| Scott A. Storms | Republican | 2017–2019 | Windsor Locks | |
| Jane Garibay | Democratic | 2019– | Windsor | |

== Recent elections ==
=== 2020 ===
2020 Connecticut State House of Representatives election, District 60
| Party | Candidate | Votes | % |
|---|---|---|---|
| Democratic | Jane Garibay (incumbent) | 7,274 | 54.76 |
| Republican | Scott A. Storms | 5,450 | 41.03 |
| Independent Party | Scott A. Storms | 559 | 4.21 |
| Total votes | | 13,283 | 100.00 |
| Democratic hold | | | |

=== 2018 ===
2018 Connecticut House of Representatives election, District 60
| Party | Candidate | Votes | % |
|---|---|---|---|
| Democratic | Jane Garibay | 5,454 | 52.9 |
| Republican | Scott Storms (Incumbent) | 4,863 | 47.1 |
| Total votes | | 10,317 | 100.00 |
| Democratic gain from Republican | | | |

=== 2016 ===
2016 Connecticut House of Representatives election, District 60
| Party | Candidate | Votes | % |
|---|---|---|---|
| Republican | Scott Storms | 6,229 | 53.44 |
| Democratic | Tim Curtis | 5,427 | 46.56 |
| Total votes | | 11,656 | 100.00 |
| Republican gain from Democratic | | | |

=== 2014 ===
2014 Connecticut House of Representatives election, District 60
| Party | Candidate | Votes | % |
|---|---|---|---|
| Democratic | Peggy Sayers (Incumbent) | 4,263 | 52.1 |
| Republican | Scott Storms | 3,702 | 45.2 |
| Independent Party | Scott Storms | 223 | 2.7 |
| Total votes | | 8,188 | 100.00 |
| Democratic hold | | | |

=== 2012 ===
2012 Connecticut House of Representatives election, District 60
| Party | Candidate | Votes | % |
|---|---|---|---|
| Democratic | Peggy Sayers (Incumbent) | 6,198 | 57.7 |
| Republican | Michael Russo | 4,540 | 42.3 |
| Total votes | | 10,738 | 100.00 |
| Democratic hold | | | |
