= Paul Esposito =

American politician

Member of the Connecticut House of Representatives from the 148th district
- In office 1983–1985
- Preceded by: Ernest Abate
- Succeeded by: Richard Cunningham

Personal details
- Party: Democratic

Paul A. Esposito is an American politician. He was first elected to Connecticut's 148th House of Representatives district as a Democrat in 1982, defeating M. William Greaney in the general election. Esposito lost reelection to Richard Cunningham in 1984.
