= Carlo Leone =

American politician (born 1963)

Member of the Connecticut State Senate from the 27th district
- In office February 23, 2011 – January 5, 2021
- Preceded by: Andrew J. McDonald
- Succeeded by: Patricia Billie Miller

Member of the Connecticut House of Representatives from the 148th district
- In office January 1, 2003 – February 23, 2011
- Preceded by: Anne McDonald
- Succeeded by: Dan Fox

Personal details
- Born: February 3, 1963 (age 63) Rose, Calabria, Italy
- Party: Democratic Party
- Education: Sacred Heart University (BBA, MBA)

Military service
- Branch/service: United States Air Force
- Years of service: 1981–1987

Carlo Leone (born February 3, 1963) is an American politician serving as the senior adviser to ConnDOT commissioner Joseph Giulietti. Leone formerly represented the 27th district of the Connecticut State Senate as a Democrat from 2011 until his resignation in 2021. While in the State Senate, he served as deputy president pro tempore and chair of the Transportation Committee. Leone also served in the Connecticut House of Representatives representing the 148th district from 2003 to 2011. As a Democrat, he served as the deputy majority whip in the House of Representatives.

== Personal life ==
Carlo Leone was born in Rose, Italy. He earned a Bachelor of Business Administration and Master of Business Administration from Sacred Heart University. Leone and his wife, Karen, have one child.

== Career ==
Leone served in the United States Air Force from 1981 to 1987. During his service in the Air Force, Leone served with NATO forces in Spain, Italy, and Turkey. Following his Air Force service, he worked at Xerox as a technician. Leone left Xerox after 17 years of working there. Following that, he founded The Workplace, an agency that helps homeless veterans find housing in Fairfield County.

=== Connecticut House of Representatives ===
From 2003 to 2011, Leone served in the Connecticut House of Representatives representing the 148th district, which encompasses a small portion of Stamford. While in the House, as a Democrat, Leone served as the Deputy Majority Whip of the House. While in the House, Leone also served as the Vice Chair of the Regulations Review committee. Among the committees that Leone served on during his tenure in the House were the Transportation, Regulations review, and the Finance, Revenue, and Bonding committee.

=== Connecticut State Senate ===
On February 23, 2011, Leone won a special election for the 27th District seat against Republican Bob Kolenberg; the election was held to fill the vacancy left by the resignation of Andrew J. McDonald, who left the Senate to serve as Governor Dan Malloy's chief legal counsel. Leone won the 2012, 2014, 2016, and 2018 elections and won re-election for the 5th time in the 2020 election. Winning by 9,865 votes over Republican Eva Maldonado, who also ran against Leone in the 2014 election. Leone formerly served as Chairman of the Transportation Committee and Vice Chairman of both the General Law Committee and the Finance, Revenue, and Boarding Committee in the General Assembly. Leone also served as the Deputy President pro tempore of the Senate and Chairman of the Veterans Affairs committee.

==== General Assembly ====
In 2013, Leone and then-State Representative William Tong co-authored a bill to help preserve homeowners rights during the Foreclosure process. In 2018, Leone was one of 6 members of the General Law Committee to vote in support of Marijuana legalization. The bill ultimately failed to make it to the General Assembly as it was struck down in a 6–11 vote. In November 2019, following a report that stated that the Connecticut Port Authority was misspending several thousands of dollars on expensive meals and liquor. Leone was one of 21 Democrats to vote for a police reform bill in July 2020. And later stated that he hoped that similar bills would pass in the regular session in January 2021. When Hurricane Isaias hit Connecticut in August 2020, hundreds of thousands of residents were left without power for several days. Eversource, which supplies most of Connecticut with electricity, was criticized for their slow response to the storm damage. After this, the Connecticut State Senate passed a bill in a 35–0 vote that would hold utility companies such as Eversource to tougher standards. Leone was one of many state senators who spoke out in support of the bill, saying: "We’re not here by choice, We’re here because our constituents demanded us to act."

==== School Regionalization ====
In January 2019, President pro tempore Martin Looney drafted a bill that would force towns with a population of below 40,000 full time residents to consolidate and regionalize their school districts with neighboring towns. In response, Leone claimed that the bill was "only a starting point to have serious discussions" and that it was "Not prudent to rush to any judgements" in a statement given to the Darien Times. Leone has also spoken out in support of consolidating Connecticut Community colleges.

==== Transportation Committee ====
While Chairman of the Transportation Committee, Leone worked on pedestrian safety legislation. In 2019, Leone wrote a bill that would impose $20 fines on pedestrians for what he referred to as "distracted walking" or using a cellphone while walking on a street. The bill faced scrutiny from many prominent Republicans. Leone reasserted his claims, citing that the state transportation fund is set to be completely depleted by 2024. And reasserted that there is a risk of major transportation projects being canceled as a result of the waning transportation funds. In December 2020, Governor Ned Lamont announced that he would move to raise the Gasoline Tax.

==== Resignation ====
On December 31, 2020, it was announced that Leone would be leaving the State Senate in order to take a leadership position in Governor Ned Lamont's administration as a senior adviser to state Transportation Commissioner Joseph Giulietti. Leone resigned from the Senate on January 5, 2021. A special election in order to replace Leone took place on March 2, 2021. State Representative Patricia Billie Miller won the election.

=== DOT adviser ===
On January 5, 2021, Leone began serving as the senior adviser to ConnDOT commissioner Joseph Giulietti.

== Electoral history ==
Leone has run for election/re-election in the Connecticut State Senate six times. Beginning with a special election in 2011, where he defeated Republican challenger Bob Kolenberg. Leone has won at least 60% of the vote in his re-election campaigns every year except for 2014, where he won 54% of the vote. Leone has raised $648,802 in campaign contributions since 2002.

=== 2008 ===
Leone ran virtually unopposed in the 2008 election. Easily coasting to re-election against David Bedell, the write in candidate who scored 8 votes.

2008 Connecticut House of Representatives election, District 148
Party	Candidate	Votes	%
Democratic	Carlo Leone	5,686	99.999
Write-In	David Bedell	8	0.001
Total votes		5,694	100.000
Democratic hold			

=== 2010 ===
Leone once again won re-election to the House of Representatives. Winning against Republican Phil Balestriere and Green Party candidate Rolf W. Maurer.

2010 Connecticut House of Representatives election, District 148
Party	Candidate	Votes	%
Democratic	Carlo Leone	3,182	64.20
Republican	Phil Balestriere	1,690	34.10
Green	Rolf W. Maurer	84	1.70
Total votes		4,956	100.00
Democratic hold			

=== 2011 special election ===
After Incumbent Democrat Andrew J. McDonald resigned to take a position in newly elected Governor Dan Malloy's administration. The 27th Senate seat became vacant. Leone won a special election against Republican Bob Kolenberg. The election was held on February 22, 2011.

2011 Connecticut State Senate Special election, District 27
Party	Candidate	Votes	%
Democratic	Carlo Leone	4,517	54.80
Republican	Bob Kolenberg	3,725	45.20
Total votes		8,242	100.00
Democratic hold			

=== 2012 ===
Carlo Leone won re-election to a 2nd term after defeating Republican challenger Barry Michelson. Green Party candidate Ronald W. Sala also ran in the election, receiving 497 votes.

2012 Connecticut State Senate election, District 27
Party	Candidate	Votes	%
Democratic	Carlo Leone (incumbent)	19,834	61.50
Republican	Barry Michelson	11,925	37
Green	Ronald W. Sala	497	1.5
Total votes		32,256	100.00
Democratic hold			

=== 2014 ===
Carlo Leone won re-election to a third term after defeating Republican challenger Eva Maldonado. Green Party candidate David Michel also ran, collecting 357 votes. Maldonado would later run again in the 2020 election, once again unsuccessful.

2014 Connecticut State Senate election, District 27
Party	Candidate	Votes	%
Democratic	Carlo Leone (incumbent)	12,142	54.70
Republican	Eva Maldonado	9,695	43.70
Green	David Michel	357	1.6
Total votes		22,194	100.00
Democratic hold			

=== 2016 ===
Carlo Leone won re-election to a fourth term after defeating Republican challenger Gino Bottino as well as Green Party candidate Cora Santaguida.

2016 Connecticut State Senate election, District 27
Party	Candidate	Votes	%
Democratic	Carlo Leone (incumbent)	24,149	65.24
Republican	Gino Bottino	11,993	32.40
Green	Cora Santaguida	874	2.36
Total votes		37,016	100.00
Democratic hold			

=== 2018 ===
Carlo Leone won re-election to a fifth term after defeating Republican challenger Jerry Bosak.

2018 Connecticut State Senate election, District 27
Party	Candidate	Votes	%
Democratic	Carlo Leone (incumbent)	22,161	64.8
Total	Jerry Bosak	11,649	34.1
Republican	Jerry Bosak	11,101	32.5
Independent	Jerry Bosak	548	1.6
Green	Cora Santaguida	392	1.1
Total votes		34,202	100.0
Democratic hold			

=== 2020 ===
Leone won re-election to a sixth term after defeating Republican challenger Eva Maldonado. This was the 2nd time that Maldonado had campaigned against Leone. The other time being in 2014.

2020 Connecticut State Senate election, District 27
Party	Candidate	Votes	%
Democratic	Carlo Leone (Incumbent)	24,661	62.50
Republican	Eva Maldonado	14,796	37.50
Total votes		39,457	100.00
Democratic hold			
