= Connecticut's 145th House of Representatives district =

American legislative district

Connecticut's 145th State House of Representatives district
Representative
Corey Paris; D–Stamford

Connecticut's 145th House of Representatives district elects one member of the Connecticut House of Representatives. It is represented by Corey Paris of Stamford. Prior to the redistricting of 1972, the 145th district was in Norwalk.

== List of representatives ==
Representative	Party	Years	District home	Note
E. Ronald Bard	Republican	1967–1973	Norwalk	Redistricted to the 138th District
Anthony Truglia	Democratic	1973–1984	Stamford	
Richard Blumenthal	Democratic	1984–1987	Stamford	Elected to Connecticut Senate, vacated seat causing a special election in January 1988
Nicholas Pavia	Republican	1988–1989	Stamford	
Christel Truglia	Democratic	1989–2009	Stamford	
Patricia B. Miller	Democratic	2009–2021	Stamford	Resigned
Corey Paris	Democratic	2021	Stamford	

== Recent Elections ==
=== 2022 ===
2022 Connecticut State House of Representatives election, 145th District
Party	Candidate	Votes	%
Democratic	Corey Paris (incumbent)	2,687	73.86
Republican	Fritz Blau	898	24.68
Working Families	Corey Paris	53	1.46
Total votes		3,638	100.0

=== 2021 Special ===
2021 Special Connecticut State House of Representatives election, 145th District
Party	Candidate	Votes	%
Democratic	Corey Paris	730	76.4
Republican	J.D. Ospina	225	23.6
Total votes		955	100.0

=== 2020 ===
2020 Connecticut State House of Representatives election, District 145
Party	Candidate	Votes	%
Democratic	Patricia Billie Miller (incumbent)	5,898	77.26
Republican	J.D. Ospina	1,736	22.74
Total votes		7,634	100.00
Democratic hold			

== See also ==
- List of members of the Connecticut General Assembly from Norwalk
