= Connecticut's 148th House of Representatives district =

American legislative district

Connecticut's 148th State House of Representatives district
Representative
Jonathan Jacobson; D

Connecticut's 148th House of Representatives district elects one member of the Connecticut House of Representatives. It encompasses parts of Stamford and has been represented by Democrat Jonathan Jacobson since 2025.

== List of representatives ==
List of Representatives from Connecticut's 148th State House District
Representative	Party	Years	District home	Note
Otha Brown Jr.	Democratic	1967–1973	Norwalk	Seat created
Paul A. Siladi Jr.	Republican	1973–1975	Stamford	
Ernest Abate	Democratic	1975–1983	Stamford	
Paul Esposito	Democratic	1983–1985	Stamford	
Richard Cunningham	Republican	1985–1987	Stamford	
George Jepsen	Democratic	1987–1991	Stamford	
Anne McDonald	Democratic	1991–2003	Stamford	
Carlo Leone	Democratic	2003–2011	Stamford	Resigned after election to the Connecticut State Senate
Daniel J. Fox	Democratic	2011–2023	Stamford	First elected in special election Reelected in 2022, but did not take oath of office; nominated to Connecticut Superior Court
Anabel Figueroa	Democratic	2023–2025	Stamford	Elected in special election
Jonathan Jacobson	Democratic	2025–	Stamford	

== Recent elections ==
=== 2023 Special ===
2023 Special Connecticut State House of Representatives election, 148th District
Party	Candidate	Votes	%
Democratic	Anabel Figueroa	584	61.0
Republican	Olga Anastos	373	32.40
Total votes		957	100.0

=== 2022 ===
2022 Connecticut State House of Representatives election, 148th District
Party	Candidate	Votes	%
Democratic	Dan Fox (incumbent)	3,328	67.60
Republican	Wilm E. Donath	1,595	32.40
Total votes		4,923	100.0

=== 2020 ===
2020 Connecticut State House of Representatives election, District 148
Party	Candidate	Votes	%
Democratic	Daniel J. Fox (incumbent)	6,519	76.03
Republican	Wilm Donath	2,055	23.97
Total votes		8,574	100.00
Democratic hold			

=== 2018 ===
2018 Connecticut House of Representatives election, District 148
Party	Candidate	Votes	%
Democratic	Daniel J. Fox (Incumbent)	5,013	75.8
Republican	Phil Balestriere	1,604	24.2
Total votes		6,617	100.00
Democratic hold			

=== 2016 ===
2016 Connecticut House of Representatives election, District 148
Party	Candidate	Votes	%
Democratic	Daniel J. Fox (Incumbent)	5,727	71.44
Republican	Phil Balestriere	2,134	26.62
Green	Brian Merlen	155	1.93
Total votes		8,016	100.00
Democratic hold			

=== 2014 ===
2014 Connecticut House of Representatives election, District 148
Party	Candidate	Votes	%
Democratic	Daniel J. Fox (Incumbent)	2,967	66.9
Republican	Benjamin Aponte	1,283	28.9
Independent Party	Benjamin Aponte	120	2.7
Green	Brian Merlen	66	1.5
Total votes		4,436	100.00
Democratic hold			

=== 2012 ===
2012 Connecticut House of Representatives election, District 148
Party	Candidate	Votes	%
Democratic	Daniel J. Fox (Incumbent)	4,870	69.5
Republican	Phil Balestriere	2,027	28.9
Green	Rolf W. Maurer	109	1.6
Total votes		8,016	100.00
Democratic hold			
