= Anne McDonald (politician) =

American politician (c. 1933–2007)

Member of the Connecticut House of Representatives from the 148th district
- In office 1991–2003
- Preceded by: George Jepsen
- Succeeded by: Carlo Leone

Personal details
- Born: Syracuse, New York, U.S.
- Died: October 3, 2007 (aged 74)
- Party: Democratic
- Spouse: Alex McDonald
- Children: Andrew J. McDonald

Anne Byrnes McDonald (c. 1933 – October 3, 2007) was an American politician.

McDonald was a native of Syracuse, New York, born to parents Teresa Connors Byrnes and Walter L. Byrnes. Her father later remarried, to Anna Dadey Byrnes. Anne McDonald attended Le Moyne College, completing a degree in economics, before pursuing a master's of science in education at Syracuse University. She taught sixth grade in Syracuse and Ardsley before moving to Stamford, Connecticut. McDonald and her husband Alex raised their son Andrew in Stamford. Anne was a member of the Stamford board of education from 1979 to 1986. She also served on municipal and state boards for housing, aging, and numerous other issues before winning her first election to the Connecticut House of Representatives in 1990. McDonald served state house district 148 as a Democrat until 2003, when she stepped down to seek treatment for cancer. She died on October 3, 2007, aged 74.
