= Jane Garibay =

American politician from Connecticut

Member of the Connecticut House of Representatives from the 60th district
- Incumbent
- Assumed office January 9, 2019
- Preceded by: Scott Storms

Personal details
- Born: September 26, 1955 (age 71)
- Party: Democratic
- Education: Graduate Institute of Organization Management

Jane Marie Garibay (born September 26, 1955) is an American politician who serves in the Connecticut House of Representatives representing the 60th district in Hartford County.

== Political career ==
=== Election ===
Garibay was elected in the general election on November 6, 2018, winning 53 percent of the vote over 47 percent of Republican incumbent Scott Storms.
