= Patricia Billie Miller =

American politician

Pat Billie Miller
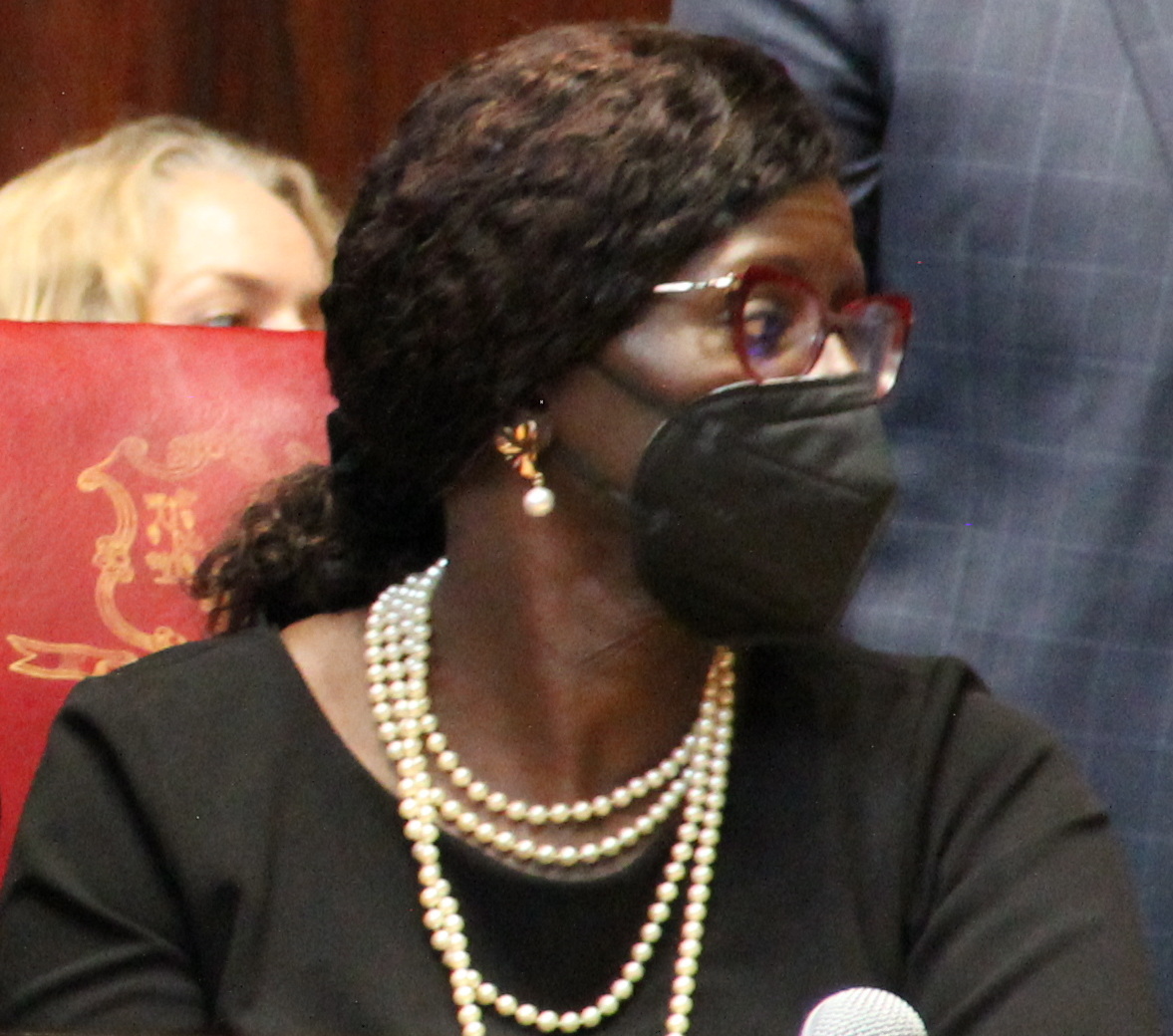
- Miller in 2023

Member of the Connecticut State Senate from the 27th district
- Incumbent
- Assumed office March 8, 2021
- Preceded by: Carlo Leone

Member of the Connecticut House of Representatives from the 145th district
- In office 2009 – March 8, 2021
- Preceded by: Christel Truglia
- Succeeded by: Corey Paris

Personal details
- Party: Democratic
- Website: www.patbilliemiller.com

Patricia Billie Miller is an American politician serving as a member of the Connecticut State Senate from the 27th district. Miller was elected in a special election following the resignation of Carlo Leone. Previously, served in the Connecticut House of Representatives from the 145th district. Miller is the first woman and person of color to represent Stamford in either chamber of the legislature. She is a member of the Democratic Party.

== Career ==
=== Connecticut House of Representatives ===
In 2008, Miller was first elected to the 145th district seat, defeating Republican Fritz Blau. Her election win was considered significant because she became the first black person to represent Stamford in either chamber of the General Assembly. Miller was re-elected in 2010, 2012, 2014, 2016, 2018, and 2020.

=== Connecticut State Senate ===
In January 2021, longtime senator Carlo Leone retired to take a position in Governor Ned Lamont's administration. In a special election held on March 2, Miller won over Republican challenger Joshua Esses. After her swearing in on March 8, she became the first woman and first person of color to represent the city of Stamford in the State Senate.

During the 2022 Senate debate on House Bill 5414, which expanded abortion access and protections for providers and abortion patients from laws in other states meant to curb abortions, Miller echoed the concern voiced by Rep. Treneé McGee during the state House's debate on the bill that Black women were too often forced into using abortion as birth control because of a lack of support for other options. "I hear family planning — code word for abortion. Why can't it be a code word for planning your family?" she said. "Sometimes we don't have the choice because we don't have the money." She was one of several Democrats to vote against the bill, which passed with a comfortable majority and was soon signed into law as the Reproductive Freedom Defense Act by Governor Ned Lamont.
