= Edith Prague =

American politician (1925–2021)

Member of the Connecticut Senate from the 19th district
- In office January 4, 1995 – January 9, 2013
- Preceded by: Kenneth Przybysz
- Succeeded by: Cathy Osten

Member of the Connecticut House of Representatives from the 8th district
- In office 1982–1990

Personal details
- Born: Edith Gelt; November 23, 1925 Methuen, Massachusetts
- Died: December 16, 2021 (aged 96) Columbia, Connecticut
- Party: Democratic

Edith Gelt Prague (November 23, 1925 – December 16, 2021) was an American politician from the state of Connecticut. A member of the Democratic Party, Prague represented District 19 in the Connecticut State Senate from 1995 to 2013. Prague also served in the Connecticut House of Representatives from 1982 to 1990. She also served on the Columbia, Connecticut school board from 1977 to 1982.

== Early life and education ==
Edith Gelt was born in Methuen, Massachusetts, the daughter of Samuel D. Gelt and Sarah P. Gelt. Both of her parents were Jewish immigrants from Russia. Her father died in 1933; she and her brother George worked in their family's grocery store to contribute to the family's income.

== Career ==
Prague, a Democrat, was a teacher and a medical social worker in her early career. She was a member of the Columbia, Connecticut, school board from 1977 to 1982. She won a seat in the Connecticut House of Representatives in 1982, which she held until 1990. From 1995 to 2013, she was a member of the Connecticut State Senate; at the end of her final term, she was the oldest member of the state senate, and decided not to seek re-election. She was the first head of Connecticut's Commission on Aging. She was considered a "legend and a powerhouse", and recognized as an advocate of careworkers and senior citizens.

== Personal life ==
Gelt married businessman Franklin E. Prague in 1946. They had four daughters. Her husband died in 1994, and she died in Columbia, Connecticut, in 2021, at the age of 96. "Edith Prague was a state treasure," said her successor, Cathy Osten. "The positive impact of the policies that Edith championed and passed into law will be felt in Connecticut for decades to come."
