= Cathy Osten =

American politician

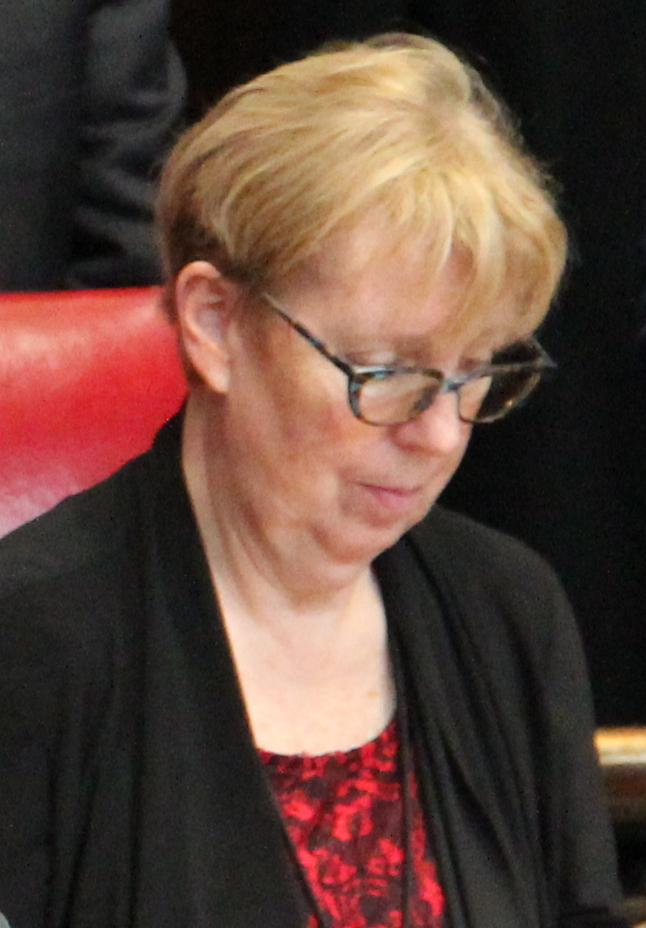
- Osten in 2023

Member of the Connecticut State Senate from the 19th district
- Incumbent
- Assumed office January 9, 2013
- Preceded by: Edith Prague

Personal details
- Party: Democratic
- Education: Mohegan Community College
- Website: www.senatedems.ct.gov/senator/cathy-osten

Military service
- Allegiance: United States
- Branch/service: United States Army
- Years of service: 1975-1979
- Rank: Sergeant

Catherine Ann Osten is an American politician and a Democratic member of the Connecticut State Senate representing District 19 since January 9, 2013. Osten was a three-term First Selectman from Sprague, Connecticut, until 2019, when she was defeated by current First Selectman, Cheryl Blanchard.

Graduating from the Norwich Free Academy in 1973, Osten enlisted in the United States Army. After four years of active duty, Osten returned to the United States, taking up residence in Norwich and attending Mohegan Community College. In 1990, Osten joined the Connecticut Department of Corrections serving for 21 years and becoming an officer.

Osten was elected as the President of the Corrections Supervisors' Council of CSEA/SEIU 2001. As a State Senator she supports a $15 living wage for all Connecticut workers.

== Binding arbitration ==
Osten, co-chairwoman of the legislature's Appropriations Committee, said the binding arbitration system is fair — and municipalities should accept some portion of paying for local teachers’ pensions.

== Megan's Law ==
Osten was a leading advocate for Megan's Law, legislation that created a registry for convicted child molesters and gave parents tools to keep their children safe.

== Service Employee International Union (SEIU) ==
As an SEIU leader and Connecticut corrections employee, Osten successful led an effort to unionize Lieutenant management. She then joined and led the effort to sue Connecticut in a class action sexual harassment and hostile work place lawsuit.

As the President of SEIU 2001 she successfully led efforts for Connecticut health care Sustinet, paid sick leave and aligning prevailing union wage and minimum wage to annual CPI increases. She was the union leader for multiple bargaining negotiations with legislative leadership and the Governor. These negotiations produced no layoffs and more spending to support essential services.

Osten joined union leaders and proposed the state of Connecticut, which underfunds their teacher and employee pensions at 42 and 55%, start and administer a retirement fund for low income workers. Local Wealth Management firms questioned the idea, "Why create a new product when knowledge is what is needed? The products already exist."

=== Defined benefit plans ===
Osten supports a defined benefit retirement system for state employees.

== Medical marijuana ==
Osten said she was dismayed that Norwich lost a chance to be host of an emerging high-tech industry. During a 2010 debate Selectman Osten stated, "Marijuana would be one of her top priorities."

== Election spending ==
Osten voted for unlimited spending for state elections HB 6580. This legislation enabled Connecticut Democrats and Republicans to raise unlimited funds through their PACs.

== Elections ==
The 2010 47th State Representative District race Coutu beat Osten 57 to 43%.

The Day newspaper stated, "He faces Sprague First Selectwoman Catherine Ann Osten, a retired corrections lieutenant who served as a union official and organizer. Ms. Osten seeks tax reform and says tax increases must be part of the budget solution..."

=== 2012 ===
Osten beat Representative Tom Reynolds to win the primary for State Senate. Senator Edith Prague, SEIU, American Federation of Teachers (AFT) endorsed Osten.

The 2012 Senate race included multiple debates. In these debates, there was much discussion on job creation, union intervention and the role of government.

In November 2012, Osten won the 19th Senatorial district by 51 to 49%.

=== 2013 ===
In November 2013, Osten earned her third term as Sprague's First Selectman over her previous Democratic Selectman Buddy Meadows. During the campaign, there were nepotism claims as Osten laid off her opponent's son while keeping her son-in-law's part-time position in the same department. She also cut hours for the Senior Center Director, Buddy Meadows, after he announced his candidacy for Osten's town job. In 2017, Osten was assaulted by her son-in-law, who "had pushed an elderly female to the ground, spit on her and kicked her in the back."

=== 2015 ===
In November 2015, Osten earned her fourth term as Sprague's First Selectman over Dennison. Osten received a 6% increase in pay and has received three government compensations since 2012. The current salary for the full-time job of first selectman is a modest $43,901, with an additional travel stipend. She also receives a state pension of $54,174 for her years of service as a Connecticut corrections officer and $28,000, plus expenses, for her part-time job as state senator.

== 2019 ==
On June 6, 2018, voters in a townwide referendum rejected by a 280-52 margin a combined $9.4 million education and general government budget that would have required a three-mill tax increase. Osten is focused on stabilizing Sprague's finances after addressing $1 million deficit. "It's left us with a significant problem," First Selectman Cathy Osten said. "We have a negative fund balance, and we haven't paid off all the bills." The town's fund balance — its savings account — ended the fiscal year on June 30, 2018, a little more than $1 million in the red.
