= Carl Schiessl =

American politician

Member of the Connecticut House of Representatives from the 60th district
- In office January 7, 1987 – January 6, 1999
- Preceded by: David J. Wenc
- Succeeded by: Peggy Sayers

Personal details
- Born: May 16, 1959 (age 67)
- Party: Democratic

Carl Schiessl (born May 16, 1959) is an American politician who served in the Connecticut House of Representatives from the 60th district from 1987 to 1999.
