= Corey Paris =

Connecticut politician

Corey P. Paris
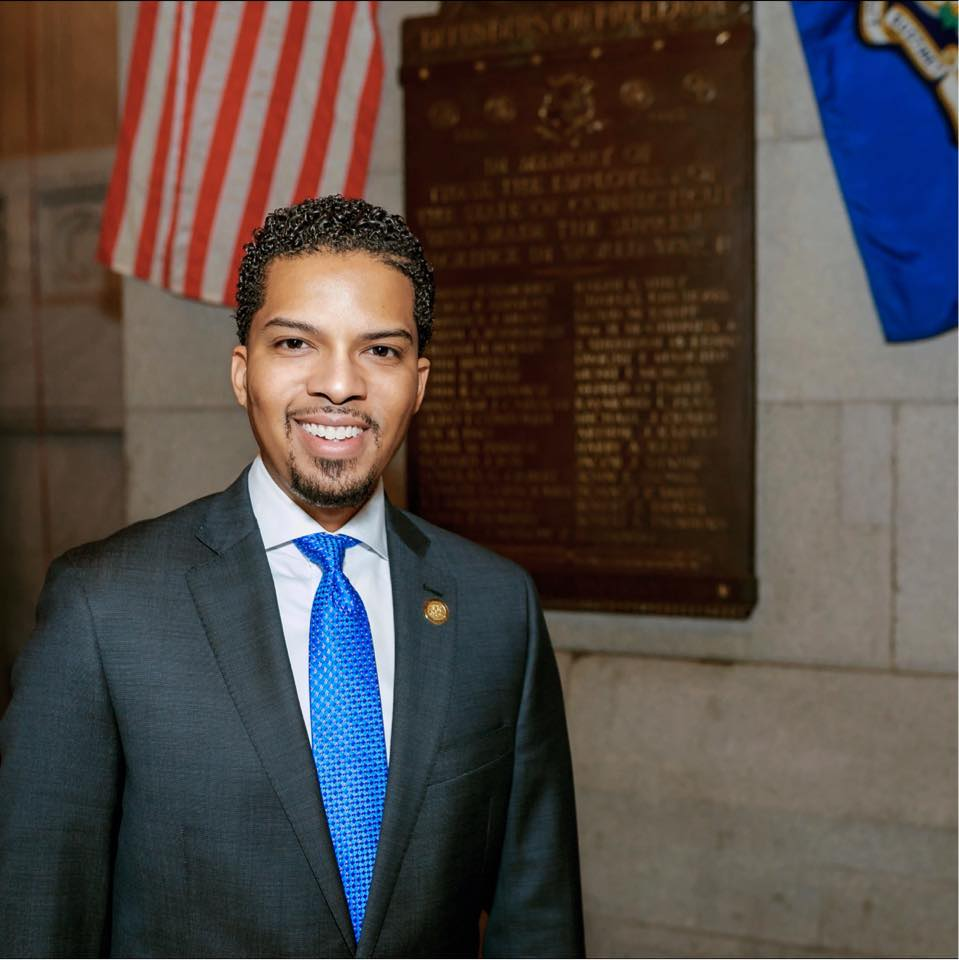

Member of the Connecticut House of Representatives from the 145th district
- Incumbent
- Assumed office May 4, 2021
- Preceded by: Patricia Billie Miller

Personal details
- Born: Corey Phillip Paris; August 3, 1991 (age 35) Little Rock, Arkansas, U.S.
- Party: Democratic
- Spouse: Symphonie Privett Paris (m. 2025)
- Education: Western Connecticut State University (BS); University of New Haven (MPA)
- Alma mater: Western Connecticut State University
- Occupation: Politician, Non-Profit Executive

Corey Phillip Paris (born August 3, 1991) is an American politician serving as a member of the Connecticut House of Representatives from the 145th district. Elected in an April 29, 2021 special election, he assumed office on May 4, 2021. He was elected to a second term in November 2022 and again in 2024.

== Early life, education, and professional career ==
Paris was born in Little Rock, Arkansas. Raised by his grandparents in Kansas City, Kansas, he attended Johnson County Community College before earning a Bachelor of Science degree from Western Connecticut State University where he also served as Student Government Association president. In 2013, Paris was an intern for the Clinton Global Initiative, an initiative of the Clinton Foundation. He holds a Master of Public Administration from the University of New Haven. Paris was the chief development officer for the Children's Learning Centers of Fairfield County. In April 2024, Paris assumed the role of chief impact officer at Person-to-Person, a nonprofit organization providing resources and support to individuals and families in lower Fairfield County; addresses food insecurity, financial assistance, and educational opportunities.

== Connecticut General Assembly ==
Paris was the president of the Connecticut Young Democrats. He also worked as an advocacy trainer for People for the American Way. He was elected to the Connecticut House of Representatives on April 27, 2021, special election with 76% of the vote, and assumed office on May 4, 2021. He is the first African American male to represent the 145th district. During his first term in the legislature, Paris was appointed to serve as a member of the Appropriations, Education, and Environmental committees.

Re-elected in 2022 and 2024, Paris was sworn into his second term in January 2023. He was appointed to the role of Majority Caucus Chair, for the House Democratic Caucus. His committee appointments include Education, Higher Education & Employment Advancement, and a reappointment to the Appropriations committee, where he serves as vice chair.

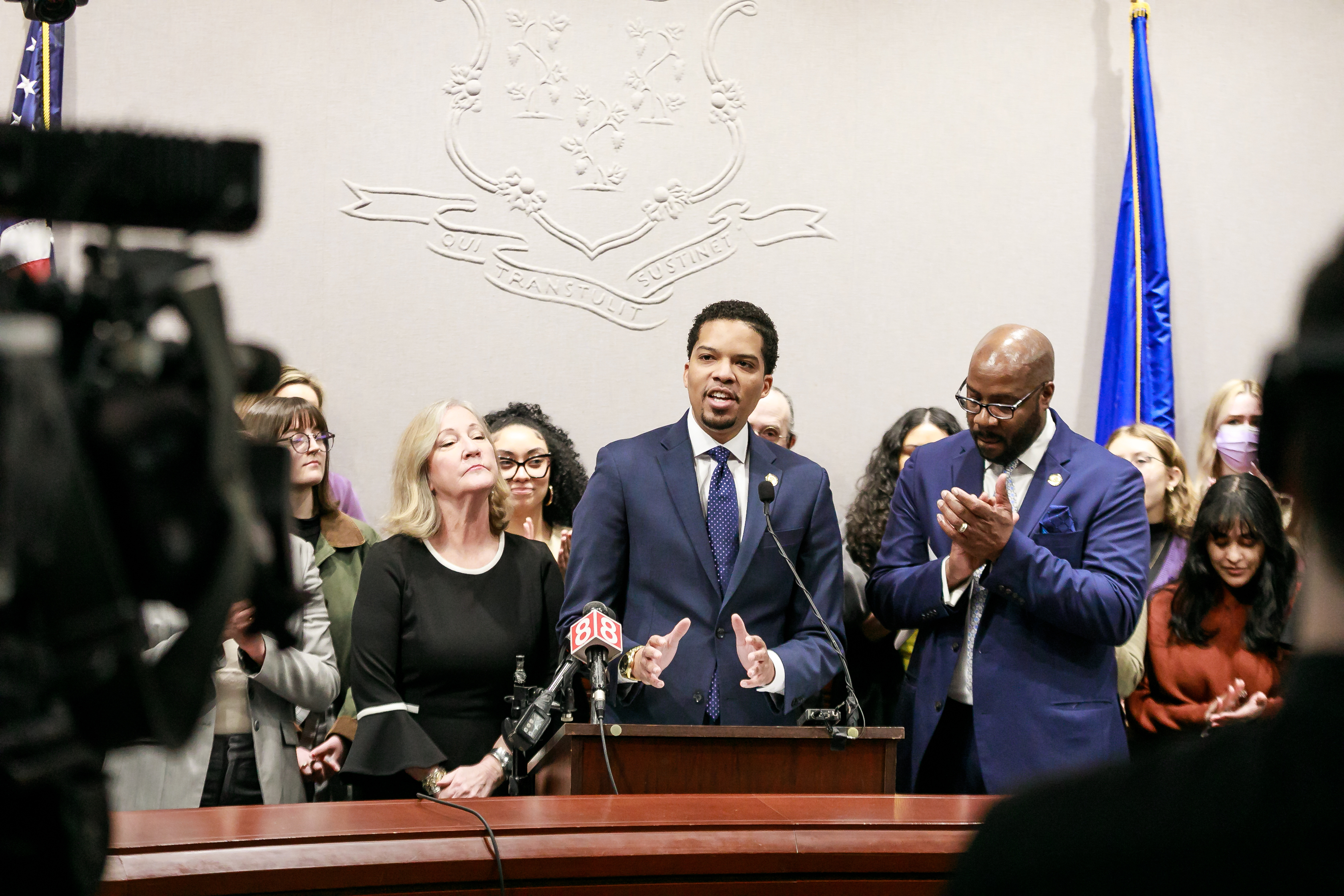
State Reps. Corey Paris, D-Stamford, and Christine Palm, D-Chester, go over notes before speaking on the student loan debt bill on March 27, 2023, at the Legislative Office Building in Hartford, Conn.

Throughout his tenure, Paris worked on issues such as poverty, support for first responders, universal early childhood education, and student loan forgiveness. Notably, he introduced legislation addressing student loan debt, creating a reimbursement program for Connecticut residents with bipartisan support and helped advance financial literacy as a graduation requirement in public schools.

Paris currently serves as chair of the legislature's Committee on Children, becoming the first male and person of color to hold that position. In this role, he has led efforts to strengthen protections for children and families across Connecticut, where he has played a key role in advancing child welfare reforms following a series of high-profile child welfare tragedies, contributing to bi-partisan policy aimed at improving oversight, accountability, and outcomes within the state's Department of Children and Families.

Paris also worked on education reform, ensuring financial literacy is a graduation mandate in public schools. His leadership recognition includes honors such as the 100 Men of Color Honoree, Connecticut Voices for Children's Champion 2022, and being listed among the NAACP Most Influential Blacks in Connecticut.

Paris has also spoken out on issues of public safety and civic leadership. In 2025, he publicly addressed threats made against him amid heightened tensions surrounding immigration enforcement in Connecticut, highlighing broader concerns about the safety of elected officials.

In 2023, the Council of State Governments (CSG) acknowledged Paris as one of the 20 Under 40 Leadership Award recipients, an annual recognition of outstanding work by up-and-coming officials nationwide. Paris served as the vice chair of the Mayor's Multicultural Council and holds board positions with the Stamford Partnership and the Ferguson Library. He has also been recognized by Wesfair Communications as a 40 Under Forty honoree.

== Personal life ==
In 2024, Paris became a vocal advocate for stroke awareness and prevention, informed by his own personal health experiences as a stroke survivor. He has used his platform to raise awareness about early detection, access to care, and the importance of public education around stroke risk, particularly in underserved communities.

Paris is married to Symphonie Privett, a morning news anchor and reporter for Fox 61. Privett has received recognition for her journalism, including a New England Emmy Award nomination for her Juneteenth special Rooted in Resilience.

The couple met in 2022, began dating in 2023, and married on September 20, 2025, in Hartford, Connecticut.

They reside in Stamford, Connecticut.
