= Connecticut's 19th State Senate district =

American legislative district

Senator
Cathy Osten; D

Connecticut's 19th State Senate district elects one member of the Connecticut State Senate. It currently consists of the communities of Columbia, Franklin, Lebanon, Hebron, Ledyard, Lisbon, Marlborough, Norwich, Sprague, and part of Montville. It is currently represented by Democrat Cathy Osten, who has served since 2013.

== Recent elections ==
=== 2020 ===
2020 Connecticut State Senate election, District 19
Party	Candidate	Votes	%
Democratic	Cathy Osten (incumbent)	24,456	50.51
Republican	Steve Weir	21,680	44.77
Working Families	Cathy Osten (incumbent)	1,392	2.87
Libertarian	William H. Russell	892	1.84
Total votes		48,420	100.00
Democratic hold			

=== 2016 ===
2018 Connecticut State Senate election, District 19
Party	Candidate	Votes	%
Total	Catherine Osten (incumbent)	21,389	57.9
Democratic	Catherine Osten	19,769	53.5
Working Families	Catherine Osten	1,620	4.4
Total	Mark Lounsbury	15,567	42.1
Republican	Mark Lounsbury	14,817	40.1
Independent	Mark Lounsbury	750	2.0
Total votes		36,956	100.0
Democratic hold			

=== 2016 ===
2016 Connecticut State Senate election, District 19
Party	Candidate	Votes	%
Democratic	Cathy Osten (incumbent)	24,614	58.51
Republican	Barbara Crouch	17,452	41.49
Total votes		42,066	100.00
Democratic hold			

=== 2014 ===
2014 Connecticut State Senate election, District 19
Party	Candidate	Votes	%
Democratic	Cathy Osten (incumbent)	15,057	51.10
Republican	Steven Everett	12,047	40.09
Working Families	Cathy Osten (incumbent)	1,369	4.60
Independent	Steven Everett	999	3.40
Total votes		48,420	100.00
Democratic hold			

=== 2012 ===
2012 Connecticut State Senate election, District 19
Party	Candidate	Votes	%
Democratic	Cathy Osten (incumbent)	19,882	51.60
Republican	Christopher Coutu	18,679	48.40
Total votes		38,561	100.00
Democratic hold			
