= Connecticut's 27th State Senate district =

American legislative district

Senator
Patricia Billie Miller; D

Connecticut's 27th State Senate district elects one member of the Connecticut State Senate. It encompasses parts of Stamford and Darien. The district has been represented by Democrat Patricia Billie Miller since 2021.

== Recent elections ==
=== 2022 ===
2022 Connecticut State Senate election, District 27
Party	Candidate	Votes	%
Democratic	Patricia Billie Miller (incumbent)	15,629	61.62
Republican	Michael Battinelli	9,733	38.38
Total votes		25,362	100.00
Democratic hold			

=== 2021 special ===
2021 Special Election, District 24
Party	Candidate	Votes	%
Democratic	Patricia Billie Miller	4,692	59.50
Republican	Joshua Esses	3,109	39.40
Independent	Brian Merlen	87	1.1
Total votes		7,888	100.00
Republican hold			

=== 2020 ===
2020 Connecticut State Senate election, District 27
Party	Candidate	Votes	%
Democratic	Carlo Leone (Incumbent)	29,279	63.83
Republican	Eva Maldonado	15,307	33.37
Independent Party	Eva Maldonado	1,287	2.81
Total votes		39,457	100.00
Democratic hold			

=== 2018 ===
2018 Connecticut State Senate election, District 27
Party	Candidate	Votes	%
Democratic	Carlo Leone (incumbent)	22,161	64.8
Total	Jerry Bosak	11,649	34.1
Republican	Jerry Bosak	11,101	32.5
Independent	Jerry Bosak	548	1.6
Green	Cora Santaguida	392	1.1
Total votes		34,202	100.0
Democratic hold			

=== 2016 ===
2016 Connecticut State Senate Election, District 24
Party	Candidate	Votes	%
Democratic	Carlo Leone	24,149	65.24
Republican	Gino Bottino	11,993	32.40
Green	Cora Santaguida	874	2.36
Total votes		37,016	100.00
Democratic hold			

=== 2014 ===
2014 Connecticut State Senate Election, District 24
Party	Candidate	Votes	%
Democratic	Carlo Leone (Incumbent)	12,142	54.70
Republican	Eva Maldonado	8,950	40.30
Independent Party	Eva Maldonado	745	3.4
Green	David Michel	357	1.6
Total votes		22,194	100.00
Democratic hold			

=== 2012 ===
2016 Connecticut State Senate Election, District 24
Party	Candidate	Votes	%
Democratic	Carlo Leone (Incumbent)	19,834	61.50
Republican	Barry Michelson	11,925	37.00
Green	Ronald W. Sala	497	1.5
Total votes		32,256	100.00
Democratic hold			
