= 1990 United States House of Representatives elections in Connecticut =

- November 6, 1990

All 6 Connecticut seats to the United States House of Representatives
- Turnout: 68.2%
	Majority party	Minority party
Party	Republican	Democratic
Last election	3	3
Seats won	3	3
Seat change	Steady	Steady
Popular vote	545,751	489,206
Percentage	52.64%	47.18%
Swing	▲2.16%	▼2.08%

The 1990 United States House of Representatives elections in Connecticut were held on November 6, 1990, to elect the six members of the U.S. House, one from each of the state's congressional districts, to represent Connecticut in the 102nd Congress. These elections coincided with a gubernatorial election and elections to the state legislature.

Republicans and Democrats retained the 3-3 split in the state's congressional delegation, with no seat changing hands.

== Overview ==
United States House of Representatives elections in Connecticut, 1990
Party	Votes	Percentage	Seats	+/–
Republican	545,751	52.64%	3	0
Democratic	489,206	47.18%	3	0
Liberty	1,888	0.18%	0	0
Write-in candidates	47	0.00%	0	0
Totals	1,036,892	100.00%	6	—

Popular vote
Republican	52.64%
Democratic	47.18%

House seats
Republican	50.0%
Democratic	50.0%

== District 1 ==
1990 Connecticut's 1st congressional district election
- Turnout: 68.9%
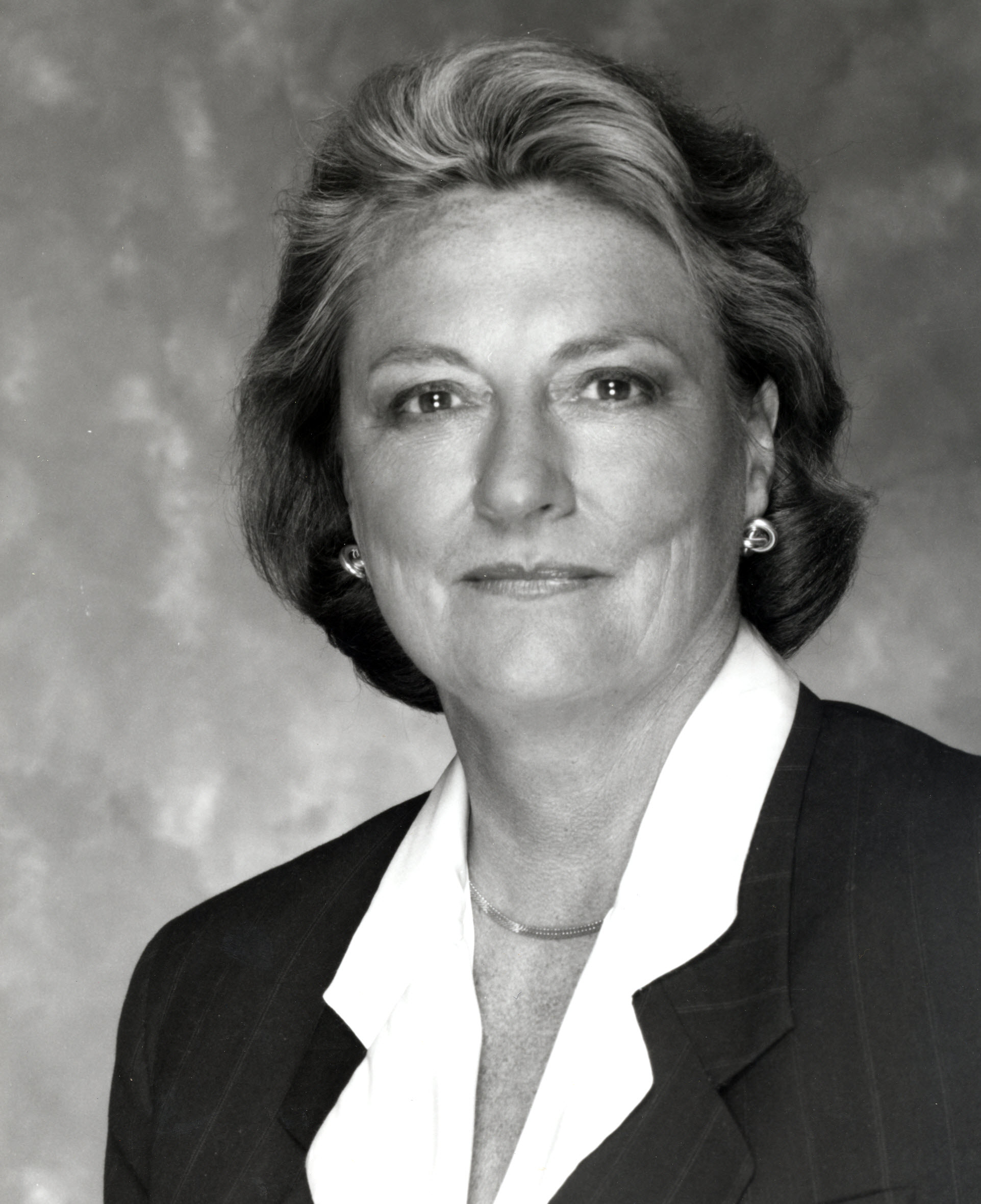

Nominee	Barbara B. Kennelly	James P. Garvey
Party	Democratic	Republican
Popular vote	126,566	50,690
Percentage	71.40%	28.60%
U.S. Representative before election
Barbara B. Kennelly
Democratic
Elected U.S. Representative
Barbara B. Kennelly
Democratic

Incumbent Democrat Barbara B. Kennelly, who was originally elected in 1981, faced 25 year-old Republican opponent James P. Garvey, a former aide to U.S. Representative Norman D. Shumway. Kennelly won re-election with 71.4% of the vote.

Results

1990 Connecticut's 1st congressional district election
Party	Candidate	Votes	%
Democratic	Barbara B. Kennelly (incumbent)	126,566	71.40%
Republican	James P. Garvey	50,690	28.60%
Total votes		177,256	100.00%
Democratic hold			

== District 2 ==
1990 Connecticut's 2nd congressional district election
- Turnout: 69.6%
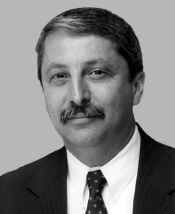

Nominee	Sam Gejdenson	John M. Ragsdale
Party	Democratic	Republican
Popular vote	105,085	70,922
Percentage	59.70%	40.29%
U.S. Representative before election
Sam Gejdenson
Democratic
Elected U.S. Representative
Sam Gejdenson
Democratic

Incumbent Democrat Sam Gejdenson, originally elected in 1980, faced Republican nominee John M. Ragsdale, a real estate developer from Stonington. Gejdenson won re-election to a sixth term with 59.7% of the vote.

=== Republican primary ===
==== Nominee ====
- John M. Ragsdale, Stonington real estate developer.

==== Defeated at convention ====
- William B. Cutler, Stonington commercial real estate agent.

==== Convention ====
July 16 Republican convention
Candidate	Round 1	
Candidate	Votes	%
John M. Ragsdale	92	61.75%
William B. Cutler	57	38.25%
Inactive Ballots	1 ballot	

=== General election ===
==== Results ====
1990 Connecticut's 2nd congressional district election
Party	Candidate	Votes	%
Democratic	Sam Gejdenson (incumbent)	105,085	59.70%
Republican	John M. Ragsdale	70,922	40.29%
Write-in		8	0.01%
Total votes		176,015	100.00%
Democratic hold			

== District 3 ==
1990 Connecticut's 3rd congressional district election
- Turnout: 66.0%
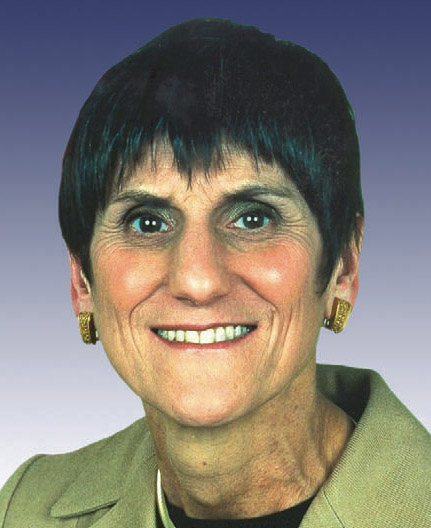

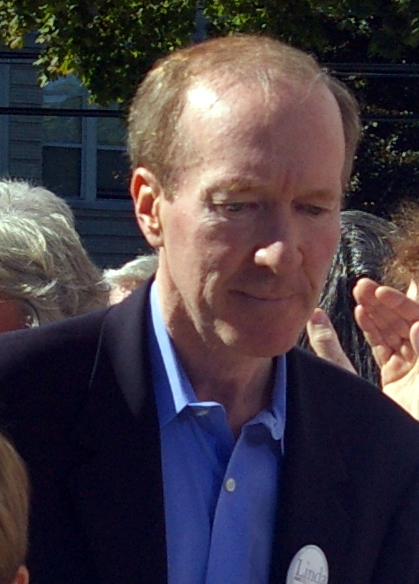
Nominee	Rosa DeLauro	Tom Scott
Party	Democratic	Republican
Popular vote	90,772	83,440
Percentage	52.10%	47.90%
U.S. Representative before election
Bruce Morrison
Democratic
Elected U.S. Representative
Rosa DeLauro
Democratic

Incumbent Democratic congressman Bruce Morrison retired to run for governor. Rosa DeLauro, the then chief of staff to U.S. Senator Chris Dodd, defeated Republican state senator Tom Scott with 52.1% to 47.9% of the vote.

=== Democratic primary ===
==== Nominee ====
- Rosa DeLauro, chief of staff to U.S. Senator Chris Dodd.

==== Withdrew ====
- Mike Lawlor, state representative from the 99th district.

=== Republican primary ===
==== Nominee ====
- Tom Scott, state senator from the 14th district.

==== Eliminated in primary ====
- Gerard B. Patton, former state representative from the 119th district (1979-1989) and nominee for this district in 1988.

==== Withdrew ====
- J. Vincent Chase, state representative from the 120th district.

==== Convention ====
July 16 Republican convention
Candidate	Round 1	
Candidate	Votes	%
Tom Scott	96	76.80%
Gerard B. Patton	29	23.20%
Inactive Ballots	0 ballots	

==== Primary results ====
September 11, 1990 Republican primary
Party	Candidate	Votes	%
Republican	Tom Scott	7,500	72.46%
Republican	Gerard B. Patton	2,851	27.54%
Total votes		10,351	100.00%

=== General election ===
==== Results ====
1990 Connecticut's 3rd congressional district election
Party	Candidate	Votes	%
Democratic	Rosa DeLauro	90,772	52.10%
Republican	Tom Scott	83,440	47.90%
Total votes		174,212	100.00%
Democratic hold			

== District 4 ==
1990 Connecticut's 4th congressional district election
- Turnout: 62.5%
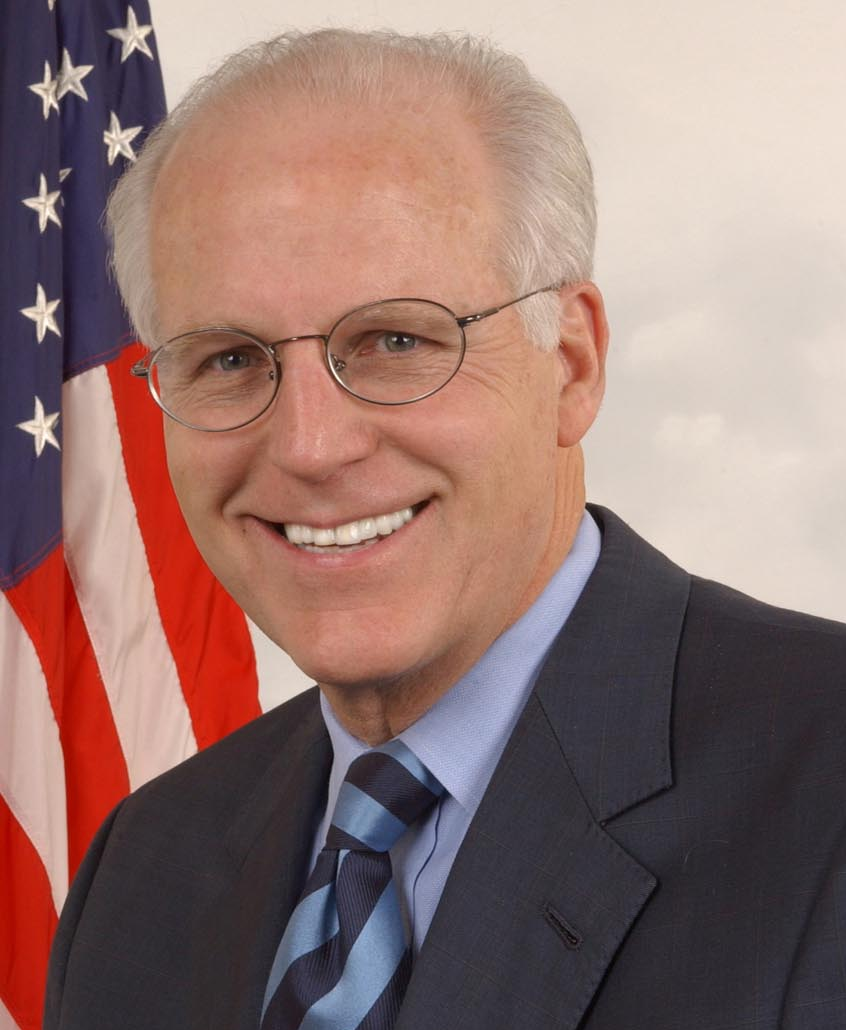

Nominee	Chris Shays	Al Smith
Party	Republican	Democratic
Popular vote	105,682	32,352
Percentage	76.54%	23.43%
U.S. Representative before election
Chris Shays
Republican
Elected U.S. Representative
Chris Shays
Republican

Incumbent Republican Chris Shays, originally elected in 1987, faced Darien lawyer and former Democratic town committee chairman Al Smith. Shays won re-election with 76.5% of the vote.

=== Democratic primary ===
==== Nominee ====
- Al Smith, lawyer and former Darien Democratic town committee chairman.

==== Defeated at convention ====
- John C. Loeser, former IBM executive from Stamford and candidate for this seat in 1988.

==== Convention ====
July 16 Democratic convention
Candidate	Round 1	
Candidate	Votes	%
Al Smith	137	71.73%
John Loeser	54	28.27%
Inactive Ballots	13 ballots	

=== General election ===
==== Results ====
1990 Connecticut's 4th congressional district election
Party	Candidate	Votes	%
Republican	Chris Shays (incumbent)	105,682	76.54%
Democratic	Al Smith	32,352	23.43%
Write-in		34	0.03%
Total votes		138,068	100.00%
Republican hold			

== District 5 ==
1990 Connecticut's 5th congressional district election
- Turnout: 70.6%
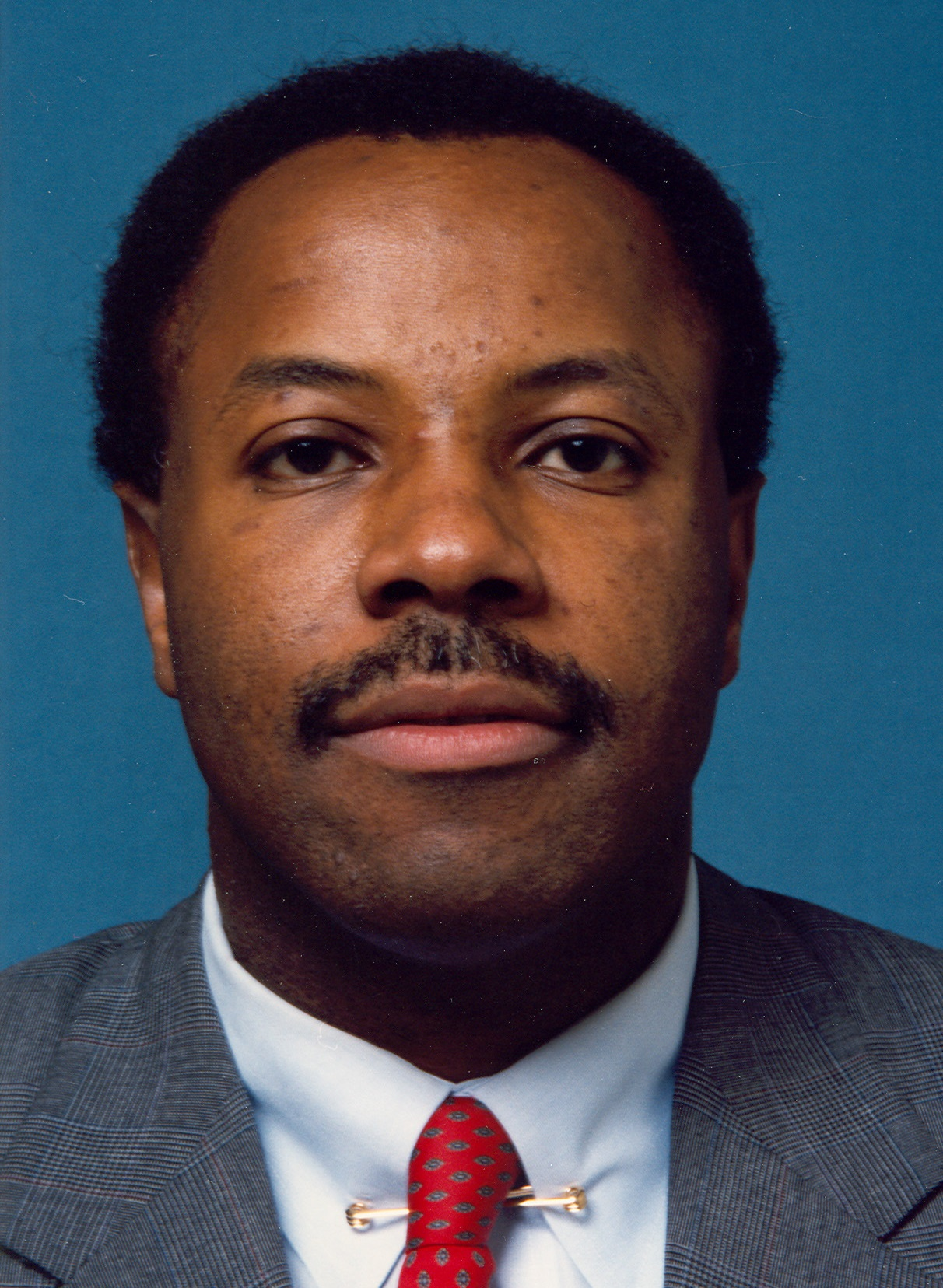

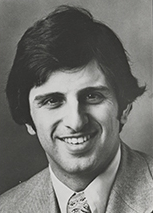
Nominee	Gary Franks	Toby Moffett
Party	Republican	Democratic
Popular vote	93,912	85,803
Percentage	51.71%	47.25%
U.S. Representative before election
John G. Rowland
Republican
Elected U.S. Representative
Gary Franks
Republican

Incumbent Republican congressman John G. Rowland retired to run for governor. Republican nominee Gary Franks, a member of the Waterbury board of aldermen, defeated former Democratic U.S. Representative Toby Moffett. Franks became the first black Republican elected to congress since Oscar De Priest's re-election in 1932.

=== Republican primary ===
The July 18 Republican convention was held at the Colonial Tavern in Oxford. Entering the convention, Gary Franks appeared as the underdog candidate, having the least number of delegates on the first ballot. Of his 21 original supporters, 20 were from his home city of Waterbury. Throughout the convention, the Waterbury delegates would stick to Franks.

After three ballots, Brookfield state Senator Jamie McLaughlin dropped out after declining to 16 votes. After the sixth roll call with no clear front-runner, the Sarasin camp convinced the convention to adopt a rule which would eliminate the candidate with the lowest number of delegates on each succeeding ballot. On the seventh roll-call, Franks appeared to be in last place. Suddenly, Schlesinger convinced a number of his delegates to switch their votes to Franks in an effort to eliminate Sarasin, which succeeded. This move would backfire, however, as on the eighth ballot Schlesinger scored last place behind Franks and Watson. Schlesinger then urged his delegates to support Franks. On the ninth ballot Franks defeated Watson 80-62, with Watson subsequently endorsing him.

==== Nominee ====
- Gary Franks, member of the Waterbury Board of Aldermen and nominee for state comptroller in 1986.

==== Defeated at convention ====
- Steve Watson, former regional director for the RNC and special assistant to the Reagan administration from Danbury.
- Alan Schlesinger, state representative from the 114th district.
- Warren Sarasin, former state representative from the 105th district (1979-1985) and brother of Ronald Sarasin.
- James McLaughlin, state Senator from the 32nd district.

==== Convention ====
July 18 Republican convention (142 delegates)
Candidate	1st	2nd	3rd	4th	5th	6th	7th	8th	9th
Franks	21	21	21	24	28	29	35	47	80
Watson	36	37	36	39	39	38	37	57	62
Schlesinger	33	35	37	43	42	43	36	38	0
Sarasin	30	30	32	36	33	33	34	0	0
McLaughlin	22	19	16	0	0	0	0	0	0
Not Voting	0	0	0	0	0	0	0	0	0

=== Democratic primary ===
Previously, former congressman Toby Moffett had run for U.S. Senate in 1982 against Lowell Weicker and for governor in 1986 against William A. O'Neill, losing both times. In 1990 he moved from Branford to Newtown in order to run for Rowland's seat.

He was opposed in the Democratic primary by Michael Pacowta, the Mayor of Shelton. On the July 16 Democratic convention held at Danbury High School, Moffett won the Democratic endorsement for the district nomination, winning 127 (62%) of the 204 total delegates, with Pacowta obtaining 77 (37.7%), scoring above the 20% threshold needed to force a primary. On July 24 Pacowta stated he would not seek a primary against Moffett.

==== Nominee ====
- Toby Moffett, former U.S. Representative from the 6th congressional district.

==== Defeated at convention ====
- Michael Pacowta, Mayor of Shelton.

==== Convention ====
July 16 Democratic convention
Candidate	Round 1	
Candidate	Votes	%
Toby Moffett	127	62.25%
Michael Pacowta	77	37.75%
Inactive Ballots	0 ballots	

=== General election ===
==== Results ====
1990 Connecticut's 5th congressional district election
Party	Candidate	Votes	%
Republican	Gary Franks	93,912	51.71%
Democratic	Toby Moffett	85,803	47.25%
Liberty	William G. Hare	1,888	1.04%
Write-in		5	0.00%
Total votes		181,608	100.00%
Republican hold			

== District 6 ==
1990 Connecticut's 6th congressional district election
- Turnout: 71.0%
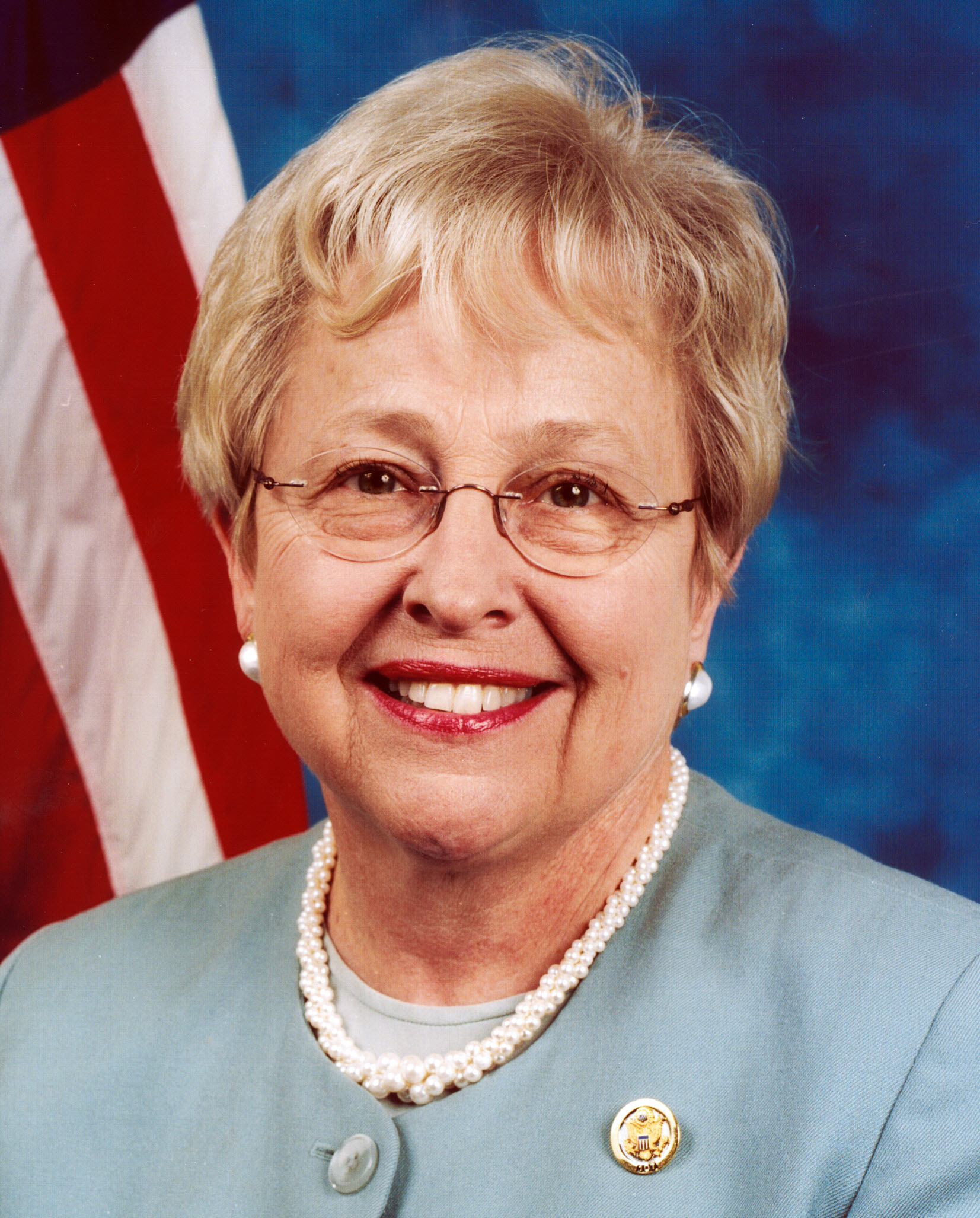

Nominee	Nancy Johnson	Paul Kulas
Party	Republican	Democratic
Popular vote	141,105	48,628
Percentage	74.37%	25.63%
U.S. Representative before election
Nancy Johnson
Republican
Elected U.S. Representative
Nancy Johnson
Republican

Incumbent Republican Nancy Johnson defeated Democratic nominee Paul Kulas, the First Selectman of Suffield. She won re-election with 74.4% of the vote.

=== Democratic primary ===
==== Nominee ====
- Paul Kulas, First Selectman of Suffield.

==== Defeated at convention ====
- Harold D. Hansen, former state Senator from the 30th district (1975-1977) and candidate for this seat in 1986.

==== Convention ====
July 16 Democratic convention
Candidate	Round 1	
Candidate	Votes	%
Paul Kulas	114	60.32%
Harold D. Hansen	75	39.68%
Inactive Ballots	0 ballots	

=== General election ===
==== Results ====
1990 Connecticut's 6th congressional district election
Party	Candidate	Votes	%
Republican	Nancy L. Johnson (incumbent)	141,105	74.37%
Democratic	Paul Kulas	48,628	25.63%
Total votes		189,733	100.00%
Republican hold			
