= 1994 Connecticut State Comptroller election =

- November 8, 1994
- Turnout: 65.1%
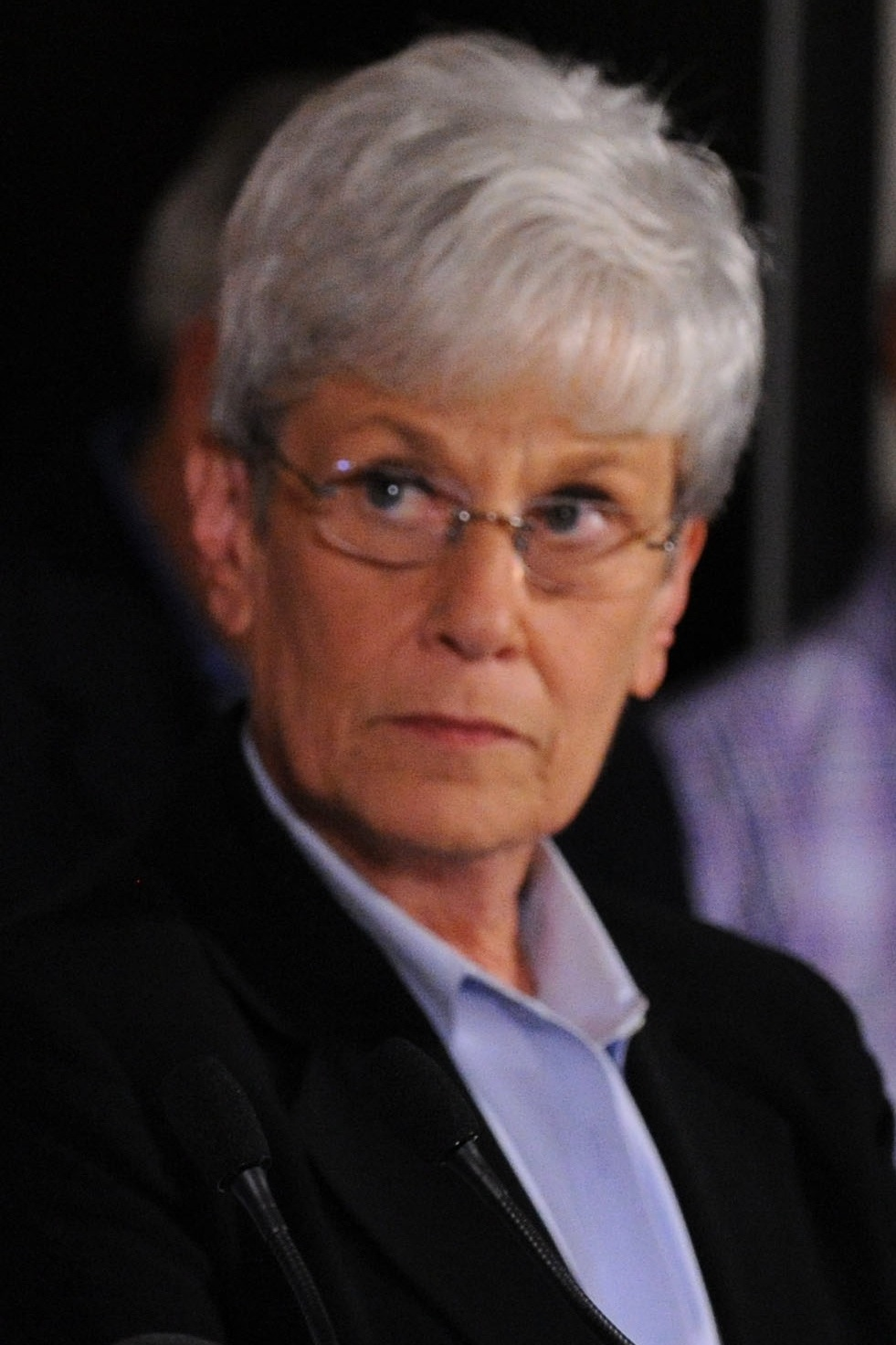

Nominee	Nancy Wyman	Gene Gavin
Party	Democratic	Republican
Alliance	A Connecticut
Popular vote	529,709	439,473
Percentage	54.66%	45.34%

Wyman
50–60%
60–70%
70–80%
80–90%
Gavin
50–60%
60–70%
70–80%
Comptroller before election
William E. Curry
Democratic
Elected Comptroller
Nancy Wyman
Democratic

The 1994 Connecticut State Comptroller election was held on November 8, 1994, to elect the next Connecticut State Comptroller. Incumbent Democrat William E. Curry chose to not seek re-election to a second term, choosing instead to run for governor.

Democratic nominee Nancy Wyman, a state Representative from the 53rd district, defeated Republican nominee Gene Gavin.

== Democratic primary ==
During the July 16 Democratic convention held at the Hartford Civic Center, there was an effort by Democrats to convince Wyman to withdraw from the Comptroller race and instead become John B. Larson's running mate in the gubernatorial election. This was in an effort to avoid a divisive Democratic primary between Larson and incumbent State Comptroller Bill Curry, both of whom were seeking the Democratic nomination for governor. Some had hoped that Wyman would agree to withdraw so that Curry would not force a primary and instead seek re-election to his office as Comptroller. However, Wyman soon refused to withdraw from the comptroller race, meaning she remained the nominee.

=== Candidates ===
==== Nominee ====
- Nancy Wyman, state Representative from the 53rd district

==== Withdrew ====
- Robert C. Paolino, mayor of Naugatuck

== Republican primary ==
=== Candidates ===
==== Nominee ====
- Gene Gavin, state Representative from the 133rd district

== General election ==
=== Results ===
1994 Connecticut State Comptroller election
Party	Candidate	Votes	%
Total	Nancy Wyman	529,709	54.66%
Democratic	Nancy Wyman	382,633	39.48%
A Connecticut Party	Nancy Wyman	147,076	15.18%
Republican	Gene Gavin	439,473	45.34%
Total votes		969,182	100.00%
Democratic hold			
