= 1994 Connecticut gubernatorial election =

- November 8, 1994
- Turnout: 65.1%
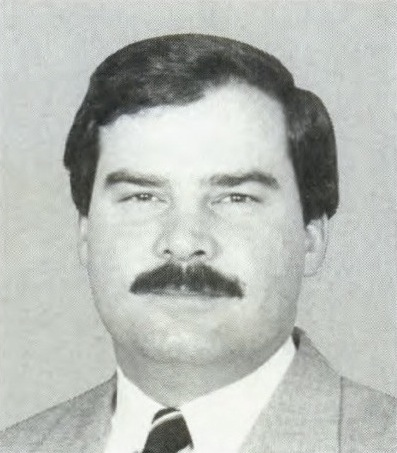

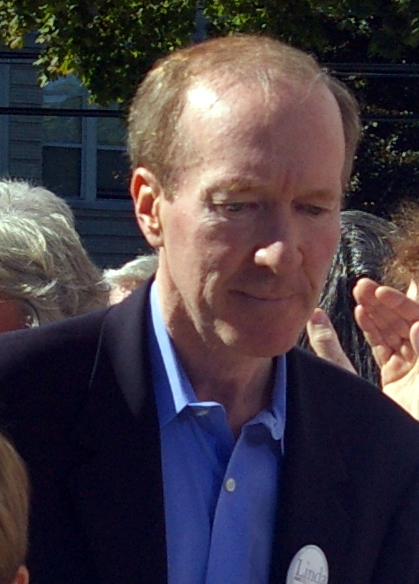
Nominee	John G. Rowland	Bill Curry
Party	Republican	Democratic
Running mate	Jodi Rell	Joe Ganim
Popular vote	415,201	375,133
Percentage	36.20%	32.70%
Nominee	Eunice Groark	Tom Scott
Party	A Connecticut Party	Independent
Running mate	Audrey Rowe	Glen O'Keefe
Popular vote	216,585	130,128
Percentage	18.88%	11.35%
- Rowland: 20–30% 30–40% 40–50% 50–60% 60–70% Curry: 20–30% 30–40% 40–50% 50–60% 60–70% Groark: 30–40%
Governor before election
Lowell Weicker
A Connecticut Party
Elected Governor
John G. Rowland
Republican

The 1994 Connecticut gubernatorial election took place on November 8, 1994, to elect the governor of Connecticut. Republican John G. Rowland won the open seat following the retirement of A Connecticut Party Governor Lowell Weicker. The election was a four-way race between A Connecticut Party Lieutenant Governor Eunice Groark, Republican U.S. Congressman John G. Rowland, Democratic state comptroller Bill Curry, and independent conservative talk show host Tom Scott. Rowland won the election with just 36% of the vote.

As a result of Public Act 93-342, which was passed by the General Assembly in 1993, the threshold of delegate support a candidate required at a nominating convention in order to force a primary was reduced from 20% to 15%, making this the first election held under these new laws.

== Republican primary ==
=== Governor ===
==== Candidates ====
===== Nominee =====
- John G. Rowland, former U.S. Representative for CT-05

===== Eliminated in primary =====
- Pauline R. Kezer, Secretary of the State of Connecticut

==== Results ====
Results by municipality: Rowland: 50–60%; 60–70%; 70–80%; 80–90%; >90%; Kezer: 50–60%; 60–70%; 70–80%

Republican primary results
Party	Candidate	Votes	%
Republican	John G. Rowland	78,051	67.83%
Republican	Pauline R. Kezer	37,010	32.17%
Total votes		115,061	100.00%

=== Lieutenant governor ===
==== Candidates ====
===== Nominee =====
- Jodi Rell, state Representative from the 107th district (Running mate of Rowland)

===== Eliminated in primary =====
- Joseph J. Rucci Jr., New Canaan lawyer (Running mate of Kezer)

==== Results ====
Republican primary results
Party	Candidate	Votes	%
Republican	M. Jodi Rell	71,139	68.04%
Republican	Joseph J. Rucci Jr.	33,414	31.96%
Total votes		104,553	100.00%

== Democratic primary ==
=== Candidates ===
==== Nominee ====
- Bill Curry, State Comptroller

==== Eliminated in primary ====
- John B. Larson, President Pro Tempore of the State Senate from the 3rd district

==== Withdrew ====
- Joe Ganim, Mayor of Bridgeport
- Richard J. Balducci, State Senator from the 9th district and former Speaker of the Connecticut House of Representatives (1989–1993)

=== Results ===
Results by municipality: Curry: 50–60%; 60–70%; 70–80%; 80–90%; >90%; Larson: 50–60%; 60–70%; 70–80%; Tie, 50-50%

1994 Democratic primary results
Party	Candidate	Votes	%
Democratic	Bill Curry	93,241	54.72%
Democratic	John B. Larson	77,165	45.28%
Total votes		170,406	100.00%

== General election ==
=== Candidates ===
- Bill Curry (D), Connecticut State Comptroller
  - Running mate: Joe Ganim, Mayor of Bridgeport
- John G. Rowland (R), former U.S. Representative for CT-05
  - Running mate: Jodi Rell, Member of the Connecticut House of Representatives
- Eunice Groark (ACP), incumbent Lieutenant Governor of Connecticut
  - Running mate: Audrey Rowe
- Tom Scott (I), radio talk show host, and realtor
  - Running mate: Glen O'Keefe

=== Predictions ===
Source	Ranking	As of
The Cook Political Report	Tossup	October 24, 1994

=== Polling ===
Source	Date	John G. Rowland (R)	Bill Curry (D)	Eunice Groark (ACP)	Tom Scott (I)
Hartford Courant	November 7, 1994	30%	25%	18%	11%
New London Day	November 6, 1994	28%	31%	13%	12%
Manchester Journal	October 23, 1994	37%	22%	—	—

=== Results ===
1994 Connecticut gubernatorial election
Party	Candidate	Votes	%
Republican	John G. Rowland	415,201	36.20%
Democratic	Bill Curry	375,133	32.70%
A Connecticut Party	Eunice Groark	216,585	18.88%
Independent Party	Tom Scott	130,128	11.34%
Concerned Citizens	Joseph A. Zdonczyk	10,007	0.87%
Write-in	Various	30	<0.01%
Total votes		1,147,084	100.00%
Republican gain from A Connecticut Party			

==== By county ====
Rowland won only three of eight counties despite his statewide victory. Curry won four counties, and Groark won one county, the last time a 3rd party candidacy for governor won a county in Connecticut.

County	John G. Rowland Republican		Bill Curry Democratic		Eunice Groark A Connecticut Party		Tom Scott Independent Party of Connecticut		Other parties Independent		Total votes cast		
County	Fairfield	136,251	51.30%	83,151	31.30%	33,805	12.73%	10,269	3.87%	2,141	Total votes cast	0.81%	265,617
Hartford	72,582	23.70%	106,664	34.83%	72,021	23.51%	52,413	17.11%	2,604	0.85%	306,284		
Litchfield	27,940	40.21%	19,368	27.87%	11,754	16.91%	9,851	14.18%	576	0.83%	69,489		
Middlesex	16,152	26.92%	19,004	31.67%	15,125	25.21%	9,339	15.57%	377	0.63%	59,997		
New Haven	114,826	41.43%	93,714	33.81%	39,010	14.01%	26,450	9.54%	3,183	1.15%	277,183		
New London	24,820	29.07%	24,363	28.54%	26,882	31.49%	8,777	10.28%	526	0.62%	85,265		
Tolland	12,356	25.40%	16,485	33.89%	10,480	21.54%	8,992	18.48%	332	0.68%	48,645		
Windham	10,274	29.80%	12,384	35.93%	7,508	21.78%	4,037	11.71%	268	0.78%	34,471		
Total	415,201	36.20%	375,133	32.70%	216,585	18.88%	130,128	11.34%	10,037 (Note: 29 write-in votes for Robert S. Loomis/Carl E. Vassar and 1 write-in vote for John Demko/Albert Rich were not listed to a specific county)	0.88%	1,147,054		

=== By congressional district ===
Rowland won four of six congressional districts, including one that elected a Democrat.

District	Groark	Rowland	Curry	Scott	Representative
1st	24%	22%	36%	16%	Barbara Kennelly
2nd	27%	28%	32%	13%	Sam Gejdenson
3rd	16%	38%	37%	9%	Rosa DeLauro
4th	14%	49%	33%	3%	Chris Shays
5th	11%	51%	28%	9%	Gary Franks
6th	20%	32%	30%	17%	Nancy Johnson
