= Eunice Groark =

American politician (1938–2018)

104th Lieutenant Governor of Connecticut
- In office January 9, 1991 – January 4, 1995
- Governor: Lowell Weicker
- Preceded by: Joseph Fauliso
- Succeeded by: Jodi Rell

Personal details
- Born: Eunice Barnard Strong; February 1, 1938 Sharon, Connecticut, U.S.
- Died: May 8, 2018 (aged 80) Bloomfield, Connecticut, U.S.
- Party: Republican (before 1990, 1995–2018); A Connecticut Party (1990–1995)
- Education: Bryn Mawr College; University of Connecticut School of Law

Eunice Groark (née Strong; February 1, 1938 – May 8, 2018) was an American politician who was the first woman elected lieutenant governor of Connecticut in 1990. Groark ran on the ticket of A Connecticut Party (ACP) with Lowell Weicker, winning the election with 41% of the vote. After Weicker declined to run for a second term, Groark ran for governor on the A Connecticut Party ticket but lost the election to Republican candidate John G. Rowland.

== Early life and education ==
Groark was born in Sharon, Connecticut, and was raised in Hartford. She was descended from Hartford's founder, Thomas Hooker, and her father, Henry Barnard Strong, was a state legislator. When Groark was six, she was trapped in the 1944 Hartford Circus Fire, which killed 168 people. Groark, who narrowly escaped with her life, said that even 60 years later, she still could not be in large crowds.

Groark earned a Bachelor of Arts degree from Bryn Mawr College in 1960 and a J.D. from the University of Connecticut School of Law in 1965. After years of private practice, she served as executive director of the Connecticut Bar Foundation from 1977 to 1981 and then served as a Republican member of Hartford's City Council from 1981 to 1985. Groark served as Corporation Counsel of the City of Hartford from 1987 to 1990.

== Political career ==
In 1990, former U.S. Senator Lowell Weicker recruited Groark to run as lieutenant governor on his third-party ticket. Groark agreed, switching parties to A Connecticut Party. Weicker and Groark went on to win the election.

In 1991, Governor Weicker introduced a controversial plan to balance the state budget by implementing an earned income tax. When the vote on the plan was tied 18–18 in the state Senate, Groark, as President of the Connecticut State Senate, cast the tie-breaking vote in favor. In 1993, she broke another Senate tie to pass a ban on semiautomatic assault weapons in Connecticut.

In 1994, Weicker retired from public office and endorsed Groark for governor on the ACP line. Groark selected Commissioner of Social Services Audrey Rowe as her running mate. Outspent by her rivals, Groark lost the 1994 Connecticut gubernatorial election, winning 19% of the vote in a four-way race. Former Republican congressman John G. Rowland won the election with 36% of the vote. Democratic State Comptroller Bill Curry came in second with 33%, while conservative talk-radio host and former state senator Tom Scott, who ran as an independent, came in fourth with 11%.

Because Groark failed to gain 20% of the vote to retain major party status for the ACP, its influence ended in Connecticut politics. Some Democrats, Curry among them, blamed Groark for siphoning votes from Curry and throwing the election to Rowland. Conversely, Jonathan Pelto, a former political director of the Connecticut Democratic Party, believed had Scott not been on the ballot, Rowland would have won in a landslide.

== Personal life ==
Groark died in Bloomfield, Connecticut, on May 8, 2018. She was survived by her husband, Thomas Groark, a prominent Hartford-based attorney to whom she had been married for 54 years. Other survivors included their three daughters: Eunice, Marie, and Virginia, and grandchildren: Harry, Louise, Owen, Phoebe, Virginia, Charlie, and Tommy.

== See also ==
- List of female lieutenant governors in the United States

Party political offices
New political party	A Connecticut Party nominee for Lieutenant Governor of Connecticut; 1990	Succeeded by Audrey Rowe
Preceded by Lowell Weicker	A Connecticut Party nominee for Governor of Connecticut; 1994	Succeeded by None
Political offices
Preceded by Joseph Fauliso	Lieutenant Governor of Connecticut; 1991–1995	Succeeded by Jodi Rell
