= Lou Rell =

American aviator (1940–2014)

First Gentleman of Connecticut
- In role July 1, 2004 – January 5, 2011
- Governor: Jodi Rell
- Preceded by: Patty Rowland (First Lady)
- Succeeded by: Cathy Malloy (First Lady)

Personal details
- Born: Louis Robert Rell; November 19, 1940 Philadelphia, Pennsylvania, U.S.
- Died: March 22, 2014 (aged 73) Pensacola Beach, Florida, U.S.
- Spouse: Mary Carolyn Reavis (m. 1967)
- Children: 2
- Occupation: Pilot

Louis Robert Rell (November 19, 1940 – March 22, 2014) was an American aviator, commercial airline pilot, and veteran of the United States Navy. The husband of the 87th Governor of Connecticut, Jodi Rell, he served as the First Gentleman of Connecticut from 2004 to 2011.

== Biography ==
=== Early life ===
Rell was born in 1940 in Philadelphia, Pennsylvania, to Louis and Helen (née White) Rell.

=== Career ===
Rell served in the United States Navy as a pilot, stationed at Naval Station Norfolk in Norfolk, Virginia. Rell flew electronic surveillance aircraft from U.S. Naval aircraft carriers. He met his future wife, Jodi Rell, while she was a student at nearby Old Dominion University. The couple, who married in 1967, moved to New Jersey, where he took a position as a commercial airline pilot for Trans World Airlines (TWA). They then moved north to a 19th-century, clapboard farmhouse in Brookfield, Connecticut, in Fairfield County. Brookfield is popular with airline pilots based in New York City.

Jodi Rell entered politics as a campaign worker for Rep. David Smith, an Eastern Airlines pilot and member of the Connecticut House of Representatives. Smith declined to seek re-election to a fifth term in the state House in 1984 and encouraged Jodi Rell to run to succeed him. Rell was elected in 1984. Lou Rell privately and publicly supported his wife's political career. He took leaves of absence from the airline during busy legislative sessions.

Rell retired from commercial aviation. He soon launched a medical taxi business, which shuttled patients to medical appointments. He also served as a Brookfield police commissioner, as well as a firefighter and former president of the Brookfield Volunteer Fire Company.

On July 1, 2004, then-Lt. Governor Jodi Rell was sworn in Governor of Connecticut following the resignation of her predecessor, John G. Rowland, amid a federal corruption probe. The move made Lou Rell the First Gentleman or First Spouse of Connecticut, depending on the term used. Rell became one of just five First Gentlemen in the United States at the time. (Fellow First Gentlemen included Gary Sebelius of Kansas and Bill Shaheen of New Hampshire.) Publicly, Lou Rell largely avoided much of the spotlight traditionally associated with state First Ladies and Gentlemen. When a journalist asked Rell if he preferred to be called "the First Man, the First Husband, the First Gentleman" he replied, "Please, just call me Lou."

He often declined interviews, though he usually appeared at official events with the Governor. However, Rell played a key role behind-the-scenes as a political adviser to his wife's administration. Christopher Keating, a political reporter with the Hartford Courant, has called Rell "a sharp student of politics who understood the nuances of the political game in the state of Connecticut." Jodi Rell was elected to a full term in landslide in 2006.

Rell suffered from Barrett's Disease, a reflux disease which causes inflammation of the esophagus. He underwent surgery to remove a stage 1 cancerous growth from his esophagus in November 2007. The surgery largely sidelined Rell from active politics while he recovered at his home in Brookfield. However, he returned to his public role at the Connecticut Governor's Residence in Hartford following his recovery. Rell struck up discussions of his diagnosis (and other issues) with Connecticut House Speaker James Amann (D), who suffered from the same disease. In 2008, Lou Rell fell suffered a health setback from an undisclosed illness, which caused Governor Rell to cancel plans to attend the 2008 Republican National Convention in Saint Paul, Minnesota. Lou Rell was reportedly disappointed with his inability to attend the convention, as he was a public supporter of Republican Sen. John McCain, who was also a U.S. Naval pilot.

Governor Rell left office in January 2011. The Rells returned to their Brookfield farmhouse, which they soon sold to their daughter, Meredith O'Connor. They then moved to a neighboring condo. Lou Rell volunteered with the New England Air Museum, focusing on the restoration of aircraft in the museum's collection. He attended the unveiling of his wife's official gubernatorial portrait at the Connecticut State Library in September 2013.

Lou Rell died from cancer at his home in Florida on March 22, 2014, at the age of 73. His funeral was held at the Brookfield Congregational Church in Brookfield, Connecticut, on March 29, 2014. Dignitaries in attendance included Governor Dannel Malloy, Lt. Gov. Nancy Wyman, U.S. Senator Richard Blumenthal, former Governor John G. Rowland and members of the Brookfield Volunteer Fire Company.

Honorary titles
Preceded by Patty Rowland	First Spouse of Connecticut; 2004 – 2011	Succeeded by Cathy Malloy
