= Nancy Wyman =

American politician (1946–2026)

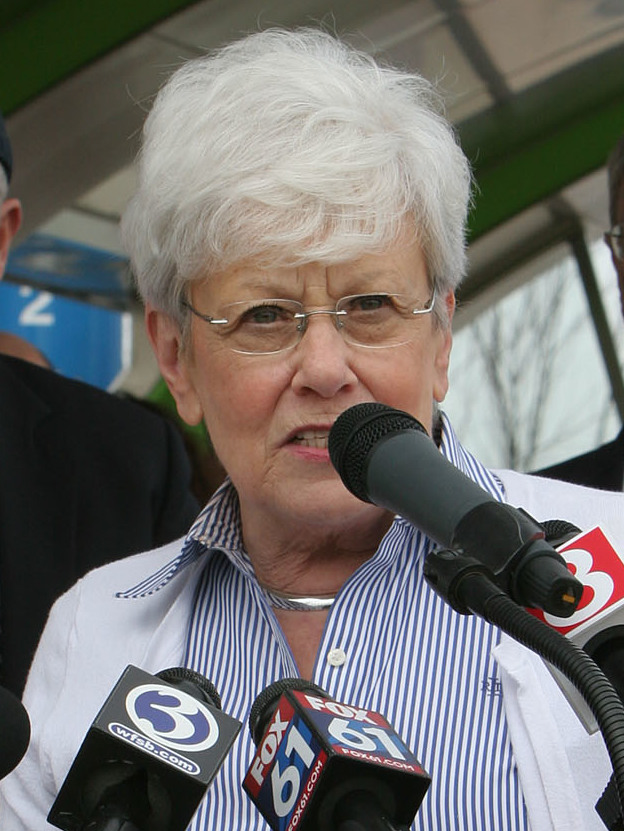
- Wyman in 2018

Chair of the Connecticut Democratic Party
- In office February 1, 2019 – June 11, 2020
- Preceded by: Nick Balletto
- Succeeded by: Nancy DiNardo

108th Lieutenant Governor of Connecticut
- In office January 5, 2011 – January 9, 2019
- Governor: Dan Malloy
- Preceded by: Michael Fedele
- Succeeded by: Susan Bysiewicz

Chair of the National Lieutenant Governors Association
- In office 2014–2015
- Preceded by: Todd Lamb
- Succeeded by: Kim Reynolds

Comptroller of Connecticut
- In office January 4, 1995 – January 5, 2011
- Governor: John Rowland; Jodi Rell
- Preceded by: Bill Curry
- Succeeded by: Kevin Lembo

Member of the Connecticut House of Representatives from the 53rd district
- In office January 1987 – January 4, 1995
- Preceded by: Michael Helfgott
- Succeeded by: Mike Cardin

Personal details
- Born: Nancy Schmukler; April 21, 1946 New York City, U.S.
- Died: August 12, 2026 (aged 80)
- Party: Democratic
- Spouse: Michael Wyman (m. 1966)
- Children: 2
- Education: Long Island College Hospital (AS)
- Website: Government website

Nancy Schmukler Wyman (April 21, 1946 – August 12, 2026) was an American Democratic Party politician who was the 108th lieutenant governor of Connecticut from 2011 to 2019. She was state comptroller of Connecticut from 1995 to 2011 and was the first woman elected to that office since it was created in 1786. She served as the Chairwoman of the Connecticut Democratic Party from 2019 to 2020.

== Early life ==
Wyman was born to a Jewish family and grew up in Brooklyn, New York, where her father worked as an accountant and supplemented his income by delivering the New York Daily News. She earned an associate degree in radiological technology from Long Island College Hospital.

== Early career ==
Wyman began her career in public service as vice chairperson of the Tolland Board of Education. She served in this post for four years but was on the board serving in other roles for five additional years. In 1986, she was elected as the State Representative from the 53rd district of Connecticut, serving in this capacity from 1987–1995.

== Comptroller (1995–2011) ==
In 1994, Wyman became State Comptroller upon defeating Republican Gene Gavin, a Certified Public Accountant. She succeeded William E. Curry Jr., who did not run for re-election in order to run for governor.

As comptroller, Wyman was the chief fiscal guardian for the state of Connecticut. She oversaw the state health plan for 200,000 state employees, retirees, and their dependents.

Despite the high popularity of Connecticut's last two Republican governors, Wyman easily won re-election. In 1998 she was challenged by Republican State Representative Christopher R. Scalzo. In 2002, 28-year-old West Haven Republican Justice of the Peace and City Commissioner Steven Mullins presented an easy challenge to Wyman.

Mullins, a real estate manager by profession, was chosen by then-Governor John G. Rowland to challenge Wyman the week of the state Republican Convention. He is the only African-American nominee for state comptroller, Democrat or Republican, in Connecticut history.

After being endorsed by three of Connecticut's major newspapers, seven-term Groton Republican State Senator Cathy Cook lost to Wyman in 2006.

== Lieutenant Governor (2011–2019) ==
Democratic candidate for Governor Dan Malloy chose Wyman to be his running mate in the 2010 gubernatorial race. After defeating her primary opponent Mary Glassman on August 10, 2010, Wyman became the official Democratic candidate for lieutenant governor. Malloy and Wyman won a narrow general election.

Wyman was sworn in on January 5, 2011, succeeding Republican Michael Fedele. She was succeeded by former Secretary of State Susan Bysiewicz on January 9, 2019.

== Political advocacy ==
In 2006, Wyman co-chaired Joe Courtney's campaign for United States Congress against incumbent U.S. Representative Rob Simmons in Connecticut's second Congressional District. Courtney defeated Simmons by a narrow margin.

== Issues ==
Wyman was liberal when it came to social issues. In March 2007, she testified at a public hearing of the State Legislative Judiciary Committee in support of Bill #7395 – "An Act Concerning Marriage Equality." In her opening statement before the committee, she stated, "To violate the rights of a few is to violate the rights of all." The bill supported same-sex marriage rights in Connecticut. In 2008, same-sex marriage became legal in Connecticut by court order.

== Personal life and death ==
Wyman was married to Tolland Democratic Registrar of Voters R. Michael Wyman in 1966. They lived in Tolland from 1973 until Wyman’s death in 2026.

Nancy Wyman died on August 12, 2026, at the age of 80.

== Electoral history ==
Connecticut's Comptroller Election, 1994
Party	Candidate	Votes	%
Democratic*	Nancy Wyman	529,709	54.66
Republican	Gene Gavin	439,473	45.34

*Wyman was also nominated on the A Connecticut Party line.

Connecticut's Comptroller Election, 1998
Party	Candidate	Votes	%
Democratic	Nancy Wyman (inc.)	501,266	56.72
Republican	Christopher Scalzo	373,337	42.24
Libertarian	Steven Edelman	9,207	1.04

Connecticut's Comptroller Election, 2002
Party	Candidate	Votes	%
Democratic	Nancy Wyman (inc.)	577,851	62.19
Republican	Steven Mullins	338,613	36.44
Libertarian	Leonard Rasch	12,651	1.36

Connecticut's Comptroller Election, 2006
Party	Candidate	Votes	%
Democratic	Nancy Wyman (inc.)	651,150	64.42
Republican	Cathy Cook	320,520	31.71
Libertarian	Richard Connelly Jr.	23,688	2.34
Green	Colin Daniel Bennett	15,427	1.53

Connecticut's Lieutenant Governor Democratic Primary Election, 2010
Party	Candidate	Votes	%
Democratic	Nancy Wyman	110,768	63.33
Democratic	Mary Messina Glassman	64,137	36.67

== See also ==
- List of female lieutenant governors in the United States

Party political offices
Preceded by Bill Curry	Democratic nominee for Comptroller of Connecticut; 1994, 1998, 2002, 2006	Succeeded by Kevin Lembo
Preceded by Mary Glassman	Democratic nominee for Lieutenant Governor of Connecticut; 2010, 2014	Succeeded by Susan Bysiewicz
Preceded by Nick Balletto	Chair of the Connecticut Democratic Party; 2019–2020	Succeeded by Nancy DiNardo
Political offices
Preceded by Bill Curry	Comptroller of Connecticut; 1995–2011	Succeeded by Kevin Lembo
Preceded by Michael Fedele	Lieutenant Governor of Connecticut; 2011–2019	Succeeded by Susan Bysiewicz
