= George Gallo (politician) =

American politician

George Gallo was the Connecticut Republican State Party Chairman from 2005-2007 and Chief of Staff for the Connecticut House of Representatives from 2007-2014. He also served as Governor John G. Rowland's campaign manager in 2002.

In 2015, Gallo pleaded guilty to federal mail fraud. He was sentenced to a year and a day in prison for taking kickbacks on campaign mailings he arranged as chief of staff to the state legislature's House GOP caucus.
