= Patricia L. Rowland =

Former First Lady of Connecticut

First Lady of Connecticut
- In office January 5, 1995 – July 1, 2004
- Preceded by: Claudia Weicker
- Succeeded by: Lou Rell (first gentlemen)

Personal details
- Born: Patricia Oemcke; 1957 (age 68–69) Hartford, Connecticut, U.S.
- Spouse: Paul J. Largay (m. 1984, divorced) John G. Rowland (m. 1994)
- Children: 2
- Education: Marymount College (BA)
- Occupation: Public relations executive

Patricia Largay Rowland (née Oemcke; formerly Largay; born 1957) is an American former public relations executive who served as First Lady of Connecticut as the wife of Governor of Connecticut John G. Rowland from 1995 to 2004.

== Early life and education ==
Patricia Oemcke was born in 1957 in Hartford, Connecticut, to Bernard F. Oemcke (1930–2016), a chiropractic and occupational therapist, and Jean Oemcke (née Poole; 1934–2021). She has two sisters and a brother. She is primarily of German, Swedish and English descent. Oemcke graduated with Latin honors from Marymount College in Tarrytown, New York with a major in English.

== Career ==
Oemcke pursued a career in public relations, most notably working as Director of Internal Communications for Colonial Bancorp in White Plains and later at Lincoln First Bank in Waterbury, Connecticut.

== Personal life ==
In 1984, Oemcke married Paul J. Largay, of Woodbury, Connecticut. With him she had two sons: Ryan Paul Largay (May 2, 1985 – August 22, 2008) and Scott Largay. After their divorce, Largay remarried to John G. Rowland, then 12-day governor-elect of Connecticut, of Waterbury, Connecticut, in a private ceremony on Block Island, Rhode Island, held November 21, 1994. Through this marriage she has two step-daughters.

As of 2024, Rowland is an antiques dealer and resides with her husband in Clinton, Connecticut.
