= Toby Moffett =

American lobbyist

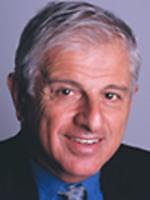

Member of the U.S. House of Representatives from Connecticut's 6th district
- In office January 3, 1975 – January 3, 1983
- Preceded by: Ella Grasso
- Succeeded by: Nancy Johnson

Personal details
- Born: Anthony John Moffett Jr. August 18, 1944 (age 82) Holyoke, Massachusetts, U.S.
- Party: Democratic
- Education: Syracuse University (BA); Boston College (MA)

Anthony John "Toby" Moffett, Jr. (born August 18, 1944) is an American former politician from the state of Connecticut. A Democrat, he served in the United States House of Representatives as the member from Connecticut's 6th congressional district from 1975 to 1983. Moffett is currently Senior Advisor at Mayer Brown LLP.

== Early life and education ==
Moffett was born in Holyoke, Massachusetts, the son of Lebanese immigrants. He attended Suffield Elementary School in Suffield, Connecticut and graduated from Suffield High School. He received his Bachelor of Arts degree from Syracuse University in 1966 and studied in Florence, Italy from 1963 to 1964. He received his Master of Arts degree from Boston College in 1968.

== Political career ==
An avid Democrat and leading voice on environmental issues, Moffett first appeared on the national scene in the 1970s as an environmental activist and coalition-builder in his home state of Connecticut.

Moffett served as Director of the Office of Students and Youth in the Office of Education within the Department of Health, Education, and Welfare from 1969 to 1970, but quit to protest the Vietnam War.

Aligned with consumer activist Ralph Nader, Moffett founded the Connecticut Citizen Action Group and parlayed this to a victory in 1974 for the seat vacated in the U.S. House of Representatives for Connecticut's 6th congressional district seat when Ella T. Grasso ran for governor.

On April 10, 1975, Moffett walked out of the House chamber during President Ford's State of the World speech when he requested military aid for Vietnam.

Moffett held the northwestern Connecticut seat until 1982. He was regarded as a liberal and an opponent of the oil industry. He was also closely aligned with trade unions. Moffett served as chairman of the House Subcommittee on Energy, Environment, and Natural Resources.

In 1981, he was selected to be one of the first Young Leaders of the French-American Foundation.

In 1982 Moffett challenged U.S. Senator Lowell Weicker. While 1982 was a strong year for Democrats nationwide, Weicker was considered a moderate/liberal Republican and defeated Moffett 52-46 percent. Moffett's protégé, liberal State Senator Bill Curry, also lost the 6th district seat to Republican Nancy Johnson.

Moffett attempted a political comeback in 1986 seeking to gain the Democratic nomination over incumbent Governor William O'Neill. That effort failed. Moffett later was a broadcaster on WVIT Channel 30 in Hartford.

Moffett's final comeback effort was in 1990 when he moved to the town of Newtown to seek election to the open congressional seat in Connecticut's 5th congressional district, which was being vacated by John G. Rowland, who was running for governor. Moffett's opponent, Waterbury alderman Gary Franks, claimed that Moffett was far too liberal to represent conservative 5th district voters, and Franks won the election.

In 2004 he broke with Ralph Nader regarding his independent candidacy for president. Moffett was among those who coordinated a national effort on behalf of the Democrats to deny votes and ballot access to the Nader campaign. He also criticized the independent campaign of Joe Lieberman.

== Subsequent career ==
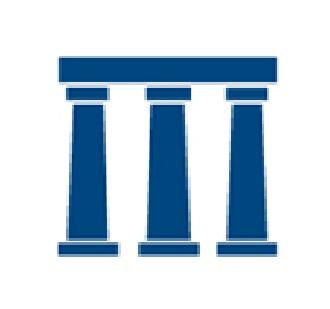
The Moffett Group

After serving in Congress, Moffett worked as a news anchor, producer and investigative journalist, and spent nearly a decade as a syndicated statewide columnist. In 1999, Moffett was nominated by President Clinton to be U.S. Ambassador to Argentina (although he had unanimous Senate backing, he ultimately did not become ambassador because the process had taken almost a year).

Moffett worked at Monsanto as an international lobbyist from 1998-2000.

Moffett is now a Washington consultant, and Chairman of The Moffett Group, representing for-profit and nonprofit entities, including large renewable energy developers and several foreign governments. In 2007, he joined with former Louisiana Congressman Bob Livingston and well-known consultant Tony Podesta to form the PLM Group, which represented the government of Egypt for 4 years.

In 2014, Moffett joined the law firm of Mayer Brown as a consultant.

In 2020, Moffett joined Washington, D.C. lobbying firm Mercury Public Affairs as co-chairman. In June 2021, it was reported that Moffett registered as a foreign agent lobbying on behalf of Hikvision, a Chinese state-owned video surveillance manufacturer.

== See also ==
- List of Arab and Middle-Eastern Americans in the United States Congress

U.S. House of Representatives
Preceded by Ella T. Grasso	Member of the U.S. House of Representatives from Connecticut's 6th congressional district 1975–1983	Succeeded by Nancy Johnson
Party political offices
Preceded by Gloria Schaffer	Democratic nominee for U.S. Senator from Connecticut (Class 1); 1982	Succeeded by Joe Lieberman
U.S. order of precedence (ceremonial)
Preceded by Drew Ferguson as Former U.S. Representative	Order of precedence of the United States as Former U.S. Representative	Succeeded by Bruce Morrison as Former U.S. Representative
