= Bill Curry (politician) =

American politician (born 1951)

Counselor to the President
- In office February 21, 1995 – January 20, 1997
- President: Bill Clinton
- Preceded by: David Gergen
- Succeeded by: Paul Begala

Comptroller of Connecticut
- In office January 3, 1991 – January 3, 1995
- Governor: Lowell Weicker
- Preceded by: Edward Caldwell
- Succeeded by: Nancy Wyman

Member of the Connecticut State Senate from the 9th district
- In office January 3, 1979 – January 5, 1983
- Preceded by: Elmer Mortensen
- Succeeded by: Cynthia Matthews

Personal details
- Born: William Edward Curry Jr. December 17, 1951 (age 74) Hartford, Connecticut, U.S.
- Party: Democratic
- Education: Georgetown University (BA); University of Connecticut, Hartford (JD)

William Edward Curry Jr. (born December 17, 1951) is an American lawyer and politician who has been a two-time Democratic nominee for Governor of Connecticut and a White House advisor in the administration of Bill Clinton.

== Education and early political life ==
Curry was educated at St. Justin's School in Hartford and Northwest Catholic High School in West Hartford. He received his undergraduate degree from Georgetown University and a J.D. degree from the University of Connecticut School of Law. In 1978, at the age of 26, he was elected state senator from a district that included Farmington, Connecticut. Curry served two terms and then faced fellow state senator Nancy Johnson, a moderate Republican from New Britain in 1982 for the open seat formerly held by Toby Moffett in what was then the Sixth Congressional District. Johnson defeated Curry.

During the ensuing eight years, Curry practiced law and worked in public policy positions in Washington, D.C. He was head of Freeze Voter, a nuclear freeze group. In 1990, Curry was elected state comptroller after a convention fight, winning statewide election against the Republican nominee, Joel Schiavone. He served one term.

== Gubernatorial bids and the White House ==
In 1994, Curry defeated John Larson for the Democratic gubernatorial nomination. The field in the general election included former Republican U.S. Representative John G. Rowland, Eunice Groark (lieutenant governor under the departing officeholder, Gov. Lowell P. Weicker Jr.), Curry and Tom Scott, a former Republican legislator from Milford, Connecticut, and talk show host running a conservative, anti-tax independent candidacy. Rowland won that election by three points.

After the election, Curry accepted a post as Counselor to the President and served as domestic strategist in the Clinton White House from February 21, 1995, until January 20, 1997. Curry left the Clinton Administration after the 1996 election and served as visiting fellow at the Yale School of Management.

In 2002, Curry again ran against Rowland. While Curry did not face a primary opponent that year, the incumbent enjoyed a fund-raising advantage of roughly 5 to 1. In late September of the campaign, Curry charged that Rowland's administration had awarded contracts based on rigged bidding procedures. Although those charges later proved to be the heart of the scandal that forced Rowland to resign, plead guilty and serve a federal prison sentence, they did not become a significant issue in the campaign. Stressing his accomplishments as Governor, Rowland won his third term by a 12-point margin.

== Journalism ==
Curry is a political columnist for Salon. Curry wrote a political column for the Hartford Courant in Hartford, Connecticut. On August 26, 2007, he endorsed a U.S. withdrawal from Iraq.

Connecticut State Senate
Preceded by Elmer Mortensen	Member of the Connecticut State Senate from the 9th district 1979–1983	Succeeded by Cynthia Matthews
Political offices
Preceded by Edward Caldwell	Comptroller of Connecticut; 1991–1995	Succeeded by Nancy Wyman
Preceded by David Gergen	Counselor to the President; 1995–1997	Succeeded by Paul Begala
Party political offices
Preceded by J. Edward Caldwell	Democratic nominee for Connecticut State Comptroller; 1990	Succeeded by Nancy Wyman
Preceded by Bruce Morrison	Democratic nominee for Governor of Connecticut; 1994	Succeeded by Barbara Kennelly
Preceded by Barbara Kennelly	Democratic nominee for Governor of Connecticut; 2002	Succeeded by John DeStefano
