= 2002 Connecticut gubernatorial election =

- November 5, 2002
- Turnout: 56.51% ▼0.08
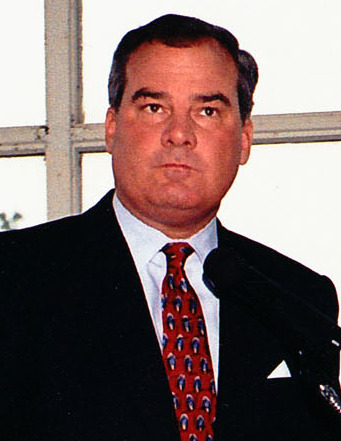

Nominee	John G. Rowland	Bill Curry
Party	Republican	Democratic
Running mate	Jodi Rell	George Jepsen
Popular vote	573,958	448,984
Percentage	56.11%	43.89%
- Rowland: 50–60% 60–70% 70–80% Curry: 50–60% 60–70% 70–80%
Governor before election
John G. Rowland
Republican
Elected Governor
John G. Rowland
Republican

The 2002 Connecticut gubernatorial election took place on November 5, 2002. Incumbent Republican governor John G. Rowland won reelection to a third consecutive term, defeating Democrat Bill Curry. Rowland became the first Connecticut governor to win a third term in office, but did not finish his term, resigning in 2004 due to allegations of corruption. Despite losing this election, Curry is to date the last Democratic gubernatorial candidate to carry Windham County.

== General election ==
=== Candidates ===
==== Democratic ====
- Bill Curry, Counselor to the President under Clinton Administration, nominee in 1994
  - Running mate: George Jepsen, Connecticut state senator

==== Republican ====
- John G. Rowland, incumbent governor of Connecticut
  - Running mate: Jodi Rell, incumbent lieutenant governor of Connecticut

=== Predictions ===
Source	Ranking	As of
The Cook Political Report	Likely R	October 31, 2002
Sabato's Crystal Ball	Likely R	November 4, 2002

=== Debate ===
2010 Michigan gubernatorial election republican primary debate
No.	Date	Host	Moderator	Link	Republican	Democratic
Key: P Participant A Absent N Not invited I Invited W Withdrawn						
Key: P Participant A Absent N Not invited I Invited W Withdrawn					John Rowland	Bill Curry
1	Oct. 2, 2002	League of Women Voters Connecticut; New London Day; WVIT-TV		C-SPAN	P	P

== Results ==
2002 Connecticut gubernatorial election
Party	Candidate	Votes	%
Republican	John G. Rowland (incumbent)	573,958	56.11%
Democratic	Bill Curry	448,984	43.89%
Write-in		56	0.0%
Total votes		1,022,998	100.0%
Republican hold			

=== By county ===
County	John Rowland Republican		Bill Curry Democratic		Margin		Total votes cast
County	#	%	#	%	#	%	Total votes cast
Fairfield	143,817	60.9%	92,478	39.1%	51,339	21.8%	236,295
Hartford	143,316	53.1%	126,484	46.9%	16,832	6.2%	269,800
Litchfield	44,033	66.3%	22,429	33.7%	21,604	32.6%	66,462
Middlesex	31,153	54.8%	25,682	45.2%	5,471	9.6%	56,835
New Haven	131,659	55.4%	105,834	44.6%	25,825	10.8%	237,493
New London	39,861	51.0%	38,284	49.0%	1,577	2.0%	78,145
Tolland	25,915	55.2%	21,065	44.8%	4,850	10.4%	46,980
Windham	14,204	45.9%	16,728	54.1%	-2.524	-8.2%	30,932
Totals	573,958	56.1%	448,984	43.9%	124,974	12.2%	1,022,942

Counties that flipped from Republican to Democratic

- Windham (largest town: Windham)

=== By congressional district ===
Rowland won all five congressional districts, including two that elected Democrats.

District	Rowland	Curry	Representative
1st	52%	48%	John Larson
2nd	54%	46%	Rob Simmons
3rd	52%	48%	Rosa DeLauro
4th	60%	40%	Chris Shays
5th	63%	37%	Nancy Johnson
