= 1990 Connecticut State Comptroller election =

- November 6, 1990
- Turnout: 68.2%

Nominee	William E. Curry Jr.	Joel Schiavone
Party	Democratic	Republican
Popular vote	489,352	470,206
Percentage	51.00%	49.00%
Municipality results
Curry
50–60%
60–70%
70–80%
80–90%
Schiavone
50–60%
60–70%
70–80%
Comptroller before election
J. Edward Caldwell
Democratic
Elected Comptroller
William E. Curry Jr.
Democratic

The 1990 Connecticut State Comptroller election was held on November 6, 1990, to elect the next Connecticut State Comptroller.

Incumbent Democrat J. Edward Caldwell sought re-election to a fifth term, but was defeated at the Democratic state convention by former state Senator William E. Curry. Curry went on to win the general election against Republican nominee Joel Schiavone.

== Democratic primary ==
=== Candidates ===
==== Nominee ====
- William E. Curry Jr., former state Senator from the 9th district (1979-1983)

==== Defeated at convention ====
- J. Edward Caldwell, incumbent Comptroller since 1975

==== Withdrew ====
- Frank Zullo, former Mayor of Norwalk

=== Convention ===
July 14, 1990 Democratic convention
Candidate	Round 1	
Candidate	Votes	%
William E. Curry	810	57.5%
J. Edward Caldwell	599	42.5%
Inactive Ballots	39 ballots	

== Republican primary ==
=== Candidates ===
==== Nominee ====
- Joel Schiavone, New Haven businessman, former candidate for Governor, and future nominee for Mayor of New Haven in 2001

== General election ==
=== Results ===
1990 Connecticut State Comptroller election
Party	Candidate	Votes	%
Democratic	William E. Curry Jr.	489,352	51.00%
Republican	Joel Schiavone	470,206	49.00%
Total votes		959,558	100.00%
Democratic hold			
