= Jodi Rell =

American politician (1946–2024)

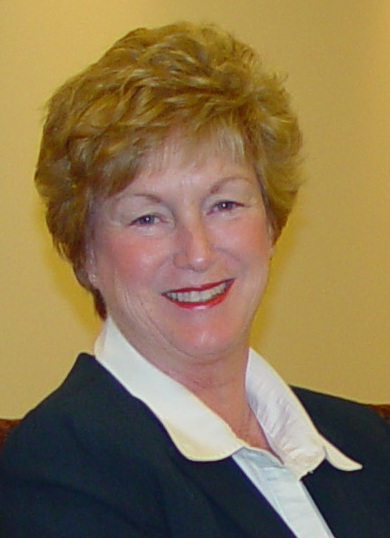
- Rell in 2007

87th Governor of Connecticut
- In office July 1, 2004 – January 5, 2011
- Lieutenant: Kevin Sullivan; Michael Fedele
- Preceded by: John Rowland
- Succeeded by: Dannel Malloy

105th Lieutenant Governor of Connecticut
- In office January 4, 1995 – July 1, 2004
- Governor: John Rowland
- Preceded by: Eunice Groark
- Succeeded by: Kevin Sullivan

Member of the Connecticut House of Representatives from the 107th district
- In office January 1985 – January 1995
- Preceded by: David Smith
- Succeeded by: Scott Santa-Maria

Personal details
- Born: Mary Carolyn Reavis; June 16, 1946 Norfolk, Virginia, U.S.
- Died: November 20, 2024 (aged 78) Florida, U.S.
- Party: Republican
- Spouse: Lou Rell (m. 1967; died 2014)
- Children: 2
- Education: Old Dominion University (attended); Western Connecticut State University (attended)

Mary Carolyn "Jodi" Rell (née Reavis; June 16, 1946 – November 20, 2024), known as M. Jodi Rell, was an American politician who served as the 87th governor of Connecticut from 2004 to 2011. Rell also had served as the state's 105th lieutenant governor of Connecticut from 1995 to 2004 under Governor John G. Rowland, and became governor after Rowland resigned from office. To date, Rell is the last Republican and last woman to serve as Governor of Connecticut.

Rell was Connecticut's second female governor, after Ella Grasso. She did not seek re-election in 2010 and left office in January 2011.

== Early life ==
Rell was born Mary Carolyn Reavis in Norfolk, Virginia, the daughter of Foy and Benjamin Reavis. She attended Old Dominion University, but left in 1967 to marry Lou Rell, a U.S. Navy pilot. The couple first moved to New Jersey, where Lou Rell took a position as a commercial airline pilot with Trans World Airlines. The family then moved to a 19th-century farmhouse in Brookfield, Connecticut, in 1969. Jodi Rell later attended, but did not graduate from, Western Connecticut State University. She received honorary law doctorates from the University of Hartford in 2001 and the University of New Haven in 2004. In 2015, she received an honorary doctorate degree of humane letters from Western Connecticut State University. In her early career, she tutored and did substitute work for the Hartford Public Schools.

== Early career ==
Jodi Rell's political career began as a campaign worker for Connecticut state Rep. David Smith during several of his campaigns. Smith, a pilot for Eastern Airlines, declined to seek re-election to a 5th term in the Connecticut House of Representatives in the 1984 election. He encouraged Rell to enter the race to succeed him. Rell was elected in 1984, representing the 107th District in northwestern Fairfield County, centered on Brookfield. She served from 1985 to 1995.

She became lieutenant governor after the 1994 election as John Rowland's running mate and won re-election in 1998 and 2002, becoming governor in 2004 after Rowland resigned due to corruption.

== Governor of Connecticut (2004–2011) ==
=== Tenure ===
In her first months in office, Rell had high approval ratings, with a December 2004 Quinnipiac University Polling Institute poll showing her at 80 percent, the highest rating ever measured by that poll for a governor in Connecticut. She announced in October 2005 she would seek a four-year term in 2006, and was nominated by the Republican Party in May 2006 to seek a full term of her own. Stamford businessman and former state representative Michael Fedele was nominated as her running mate as lieutenant governor.

Rell defeated her Democratic opponent, New Haven Mayor John DeStefano, Jr. in the 2006 Connecticut gubernatorial election. She received approximately 710,000 votes, the highest total for any gubernatorial candidate in Connecticut history. She carried all but seven towns.

Governor Rell was one of many Republicans mentioned as a potential candidate for vice president in the 2008 presidential election. The presidential nominee John McCain chose Alaskan Governor Sarah Palin as his running mate instead.

In April 2008, Rell's Lt. Governor, Michael Fedele told the media he expected Rell to run for re-election in 2010. In August 2008 she told reporters she would file an exploratory committee for a 2010 reelection bid. She announced on November 9, 2009, that she would not seek re-election. Democrat Dan Malloy succeeded Rell in office on January 5, 2011.

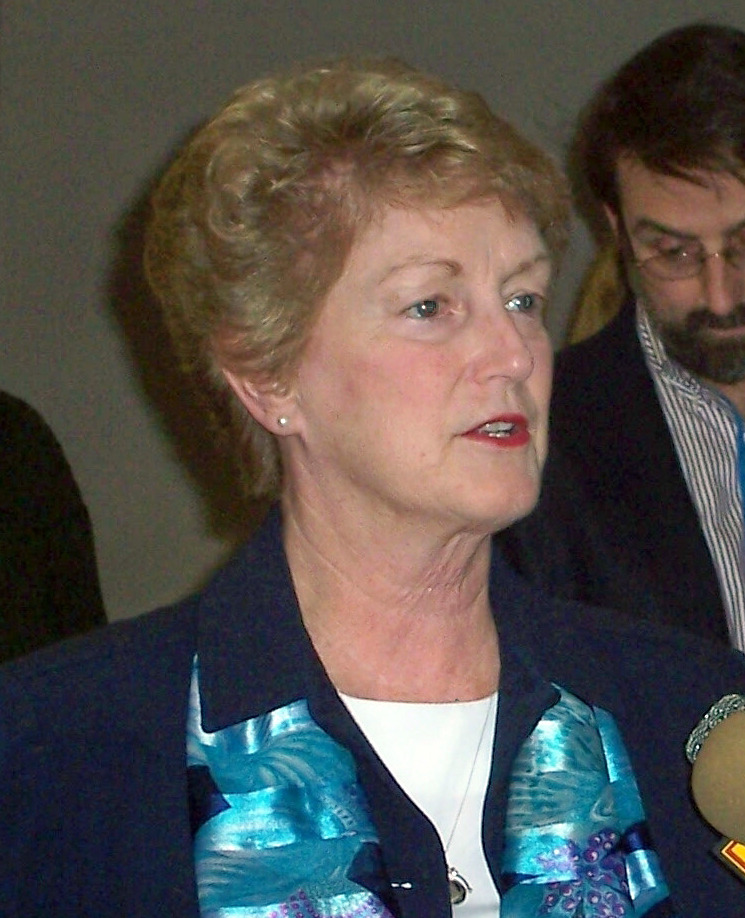
Rell in 2007

==== Abortion and embryonic stem-cell research ====
Governor Rell supported abortion rights, and she was supported by the Republican Pro-Choice Coalition and The WISH List, an abortion-rights Republican PAC. She supported abortion rights embryonic stem-cell research during her tenure as Governor.

==== Education policy ====
Rell supported a lawsuit in response to the federal No Child Left Behind Act. Connecticut's Attorney General Richard Blumenthal filed the lawsuit against the U.S. Department of Education to force Congress and President George W. Bush to amend the act because, Rell contended, it would compel Connecticut to spend tens of millions to meet impossibly high standards, even as the state's schools perform at one of the highest levels in the nation. The act required states to pay for standardized testing every school year, instead of every two years. Rell's State Department of Education said the extra testing would provide little new information about students' academic progress.

Rell delivered the 2008 commencement address at Central Connecticut State University.

==== Government spending ====
Rell supported the state's constitutional spending cap resisting pressure from groups favoring expanded state government spending which would bypass the cap. As a result, in late June 2006 the state reported a $910 million surplus for the prior year and the state's Rainy Day Fund exceeded $1 billion in deposits for the first time. In 2007 she shocked many of her supporters by proposing additional spending for education that would cause the state budget to significantly exceed the spending cap. Paying for the increased spending would require raising the state income tax. Republican legislators and a few Democrats, including (at least initially) House Speaker James Amann, as well as many others, were skeptical when Rell claimed her plan would reduce property taxes. And as public opinion polls showed steadfast opposition to an income tax hike, she changed her mind and withdrew her support for increased educational spending. Rell originally had the support of the Connecticut Education Association for her proposal, but they later switched to the Democratic plan favoring even higher state taxes and no limits on property tax increases. On May 9, 2007, Rell announced increased state revenues might make a tax hike unnecessary in 2007. On June 1, 2007, Rell vetoed a Democratic plan that increased the income tax. A compromise education plan passed both houses of the legislature in late June that did not increase the income tax, but raised the cigarette tax and did not limit property taxes. It nonetheless exceeded the state spending cap. In 2005, Rell agreed to a plan to revive the Connecticut estate tax, applying to estates worth $2 million or more. Critics said the tax would encourage wealthy citizens to leave and take their money with them.

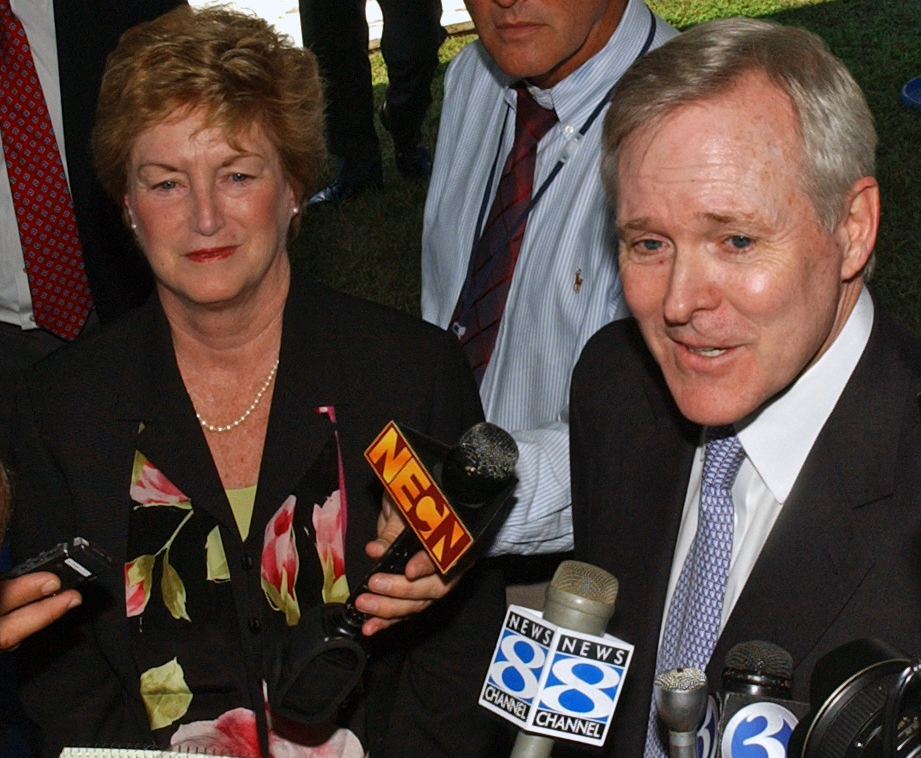
Rell with U.S. Secretary of the Navy Ray Mabus, September 2009

In 2005, Rell signed into law a campaign finance bill that banned contributions from lobbyists and would provide public financing for future campaigns. The law received support from Arizona Senator John McCain, who campaigned for Rell in Hartford on March 17, 2006.

In June 2006, Rell intervened with New London city officials, proposing that homeowners displaced by the Kelo v. New London court decision be deeded property so they may retain homes in the neighborhood. A settlement was reached with the homeowners on June 30, 2006.

In 2007, Rell clashed with Democratic lawmakers over state bonding issues. Explaining that she felt the Democratic proposal spent too much money which the state could not afford, she called on them to renegotiate a new package with less spending. In October an agreement was reached that reduced the bond package by $400 million and the Governor signed it into law.

In September 2010, Rell was one of seven governors to receive a grade of F in the Cato Institute's fiscal-policy report card.

==== Health care ====
In July 2009, the Connecticut legislature overrode a veto by Rell to pass SustiNet, the first significant public-option health care reform legislation in the nation.

==== Law and order ====
One of Rell's first major decisions as governor was, on August 25, 2004, to end the system put into place by the previous administration of housing prisoners in out-of-state corrections facilities. "Instead of sending inmates and tax dollars out of state, we can now more fully utilize correctional facilities and personnel in Connecticut," Governor Rell said. "It makes good policy and good fiscal sense." She continued, "This approach is in the best interests of the inmates, their families and our correction system. It will keep offenders closer to their families, their communities and to the support that is so critical for their successful reintegration into society."

During Rell's administration, Connecticut carried out the first execution in New England since 1960 when serial killer Michael Bruce Ross was put to death on May 13, 2005. Rell, who supports the death penalty, declined a request by Ross's lawyers to delay the execution in order for the state legislature to debate eliminating the death penalty. Legally, the Governor of Connecticut cannot commute a death sentence.

Rell faced another criminal justice issue in July 2007, when two paroled convicts were charged with the home invasion murders of the Petit family in Cheshire. Rell announced a panel would review the state's parole policies and create a study on the topic. She also reiterated her support of capital punishment. On July 31, 2007, she announced tighter parole policies and asked the legislature to define burglary of an occupied dwelling as a violent crime. In September 2007, she announced a moratorium on the parole of violent offenders. State Senator Sam Caligiuri had called for a full moratorium in July. Ironically, the man Rell appointed to chair the parole board, Robert Farr, wrote an op-ed for the Hartford Courant defending the state's parole system. Rell announced in September that she does not believe Connecticut needs to build new prisons, send inmates out of state or expand any of the corrections facilities.

In January 2008, Rell reached agreement with legislative leaders on a number of criminal justice reforms which were responsive to the systemic failures that occurred before the Cheshire home invasion. A special session in late January passed laws to toughen penalties for home invasion and to tighten parole procedures, but did not pass a Three Strikes Law which Rell, Caligiuri, and Senate Minority Leader John McKinney had favored.

Rell reiterated her call for a Three Strikes law on March 31, 2008, following the kidnapping and murder of an elderly New Britain woman, crimes committed by a convicted sex offender recently released from a Connecticut prison.

==== LGBT policy ====
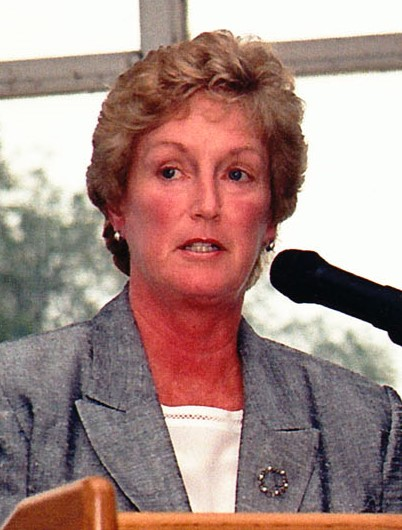
Rell in 2011

On April 20, 2005, Rell signed into law a bill that made Connecticut the first state to adopt civil unions for same-sex couples without being directed to do so by a court. The law gives same-sex couples all of the 300+ rights, responsibilities, and privileges that the state gives to heterosexual couples, including the right to adopt children, awarding state income tax credits, inheritance rights, and allowing same-sex partners to be considered next-of-kin when it comes to making medical decisions for incapacitated partners, yet does not require employers to give equal insurance benefits as they would to heterosexual couples. The bill was amended to define marriage as "between a man and a woman" after Rell threatened a veto. Rell signed the bill despite some Republican opposition to it, including from the Chairman of the State Republicans at the time.

Rell had announced that were the legislature to pass a bill establishing gay marriage in Connecticut, that she would veto the bill.

On October 10, 2008, Connecticut courts ruled that the ban of gay marriage violated citizens rights guaranteed to them by the constitution. Governor Jodi Rell responded by saying she would not fight the decision. "The Supreme Court has spoken," she stated "I do not believe their voice reflects the majority of the people of Connecticut. However, I am also firmly convinced that attempts to reverse this decision, either legislatively or by amending the state Constitution, will not meet with success." However, on April 23, 2009, Rell signed a bill into law providing for a gender neutral marriage statute. It also provided for civil unions to be automatically transformed into marriages on October 1, 2010.

==== Minimum wage ====
In May 2008, Rell vetoed a bill to raise the minimum wage in the state of Connecticut. The legislature successfully voted to override Rell's veto in June 2008. The legislation raised Connecticut's minimum wage at the time, $7.65 an hour to $8.00 an hour beginning in January 2009, and to $8.25 an hour in 2010.

== Electoral history ==
Connecticut gubernatorial election, 2006
Party	Candidate	Votes	%
Republican	M. Jodi Rell	709,849	63
Democratic	John DeStefano, Jr.	398,220	35

== Personal life and death ==
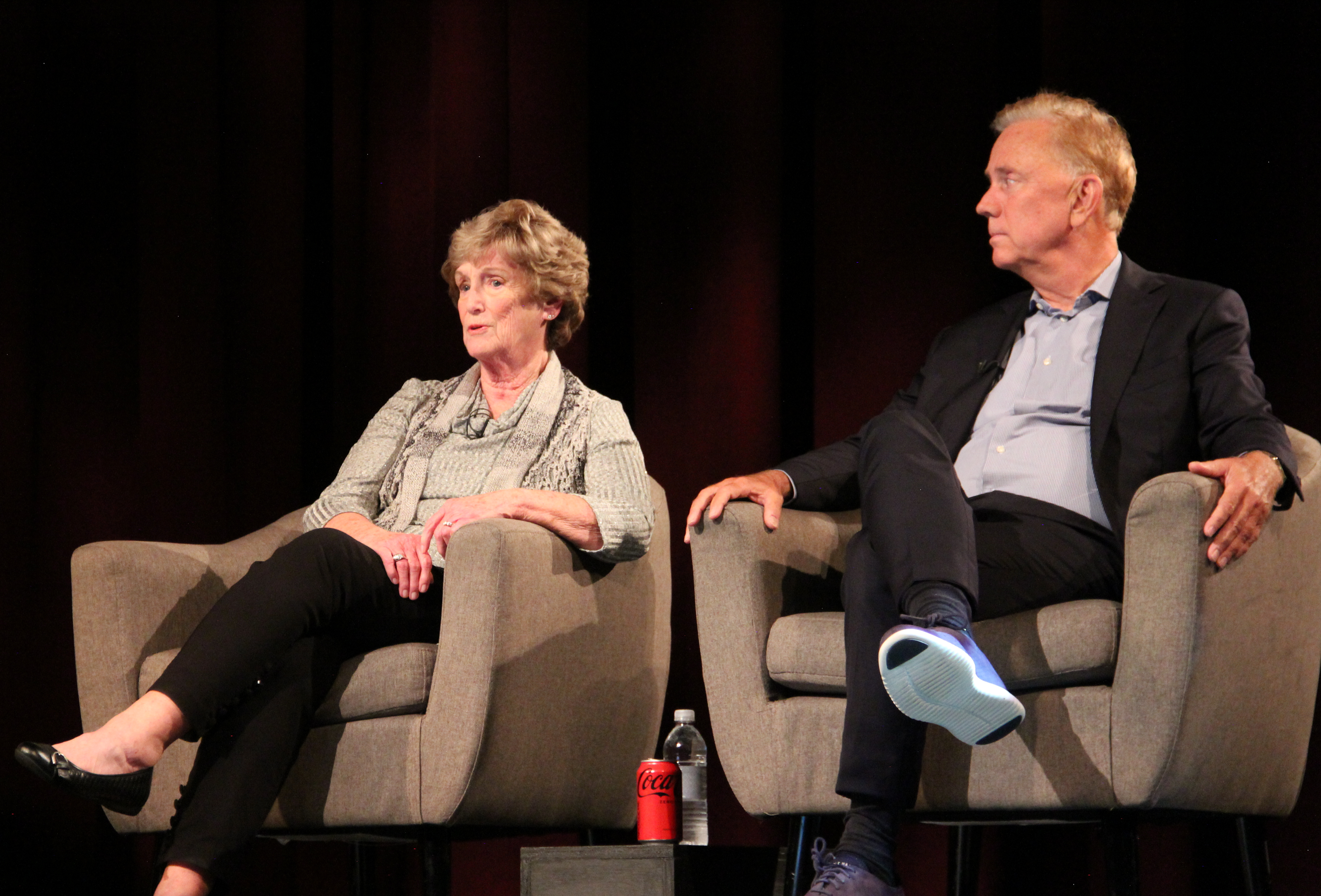
Former Gov. Jodi Rell with Gov. Ned Lamont in 2023

An Episcopalian, Rell was married in 1967 to Lou Rell, with whom she had two children, Meredith and Michael.

Rell underwent surgery for breast cancer in December 2004. Her husband died on March 22, 2014.

Rell died following a short illness at a hospital in Florida, on November 20, 2024, at the age of 78.

== See also ==
- List of governors of Connecticut
- List of female governors in the United States
- List of female lieutenant governors in the United States

Party political offices
Preceded by Robert Jaekle	Republican nominee for Lieutenant Governor of Connecticut; 1994, 1998, 2002	Succeeded by Michael Fedele
Preceded by John Rowland	Republican nominee for Governor of Connecticut; 2006	Succeeded by Tom Foley
Political offices
Preceded by Eunice Groark	Lieutenant Governor of Connecticut; 1995–2004	Succeeded by Kevin Sullivan
Preceded by John Rowland	Governor of Connecticut; 2004–2011	Succeeded by Dan Malloy
