= 1982 United States Senate election in Connecticut =

- November 2, 1982
- Turnout: 67.5%
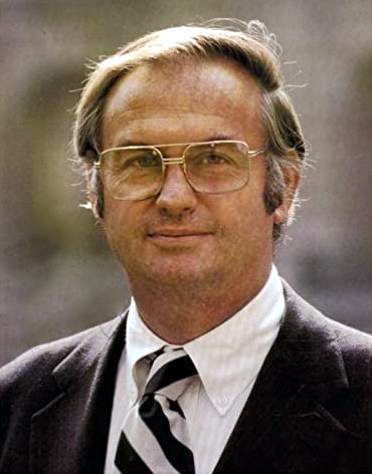

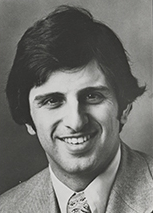
Nominee	Lowell Weicker	Toby Moffett
Party	Republican	Democratic
Popular vote	545,987	499,146
Percentage	50.39%	46.07%
- Weicker: 40–50% 50–60% 60–70% 70–80% Moffett: 40–50% 50–60% 60–70% Tie: 40–50%
U.S. senator before election
Lowell Weicker
Republican
Elected U.S. Senator
Lowell Weicker
Republican

The 1982 United States Senate election in Connecticut took place on November 2, 1982. Incumbent Republican U.S. Senator Lowell Weicker won re-election to a third term. He first defeated a challenge from Republican Prescott Bush Jr., the brother of Vice President George H. W. Bush and son of former Senator Prescott Bush, and then won the general election against Democratic U.S. Representative Toby Moffett.

To date, this was the last time the Republicans won a U.S. Senate election in Connecticut.

== Republican nomination ==
=== Candidates ===
- Lowell Weicker, incumbent U.S. Senator since 1971 and heir to the Squibb drug fortune

==== Withdrew ====
- Prescott Bush Jr., insurance executive at Johnson & Higgins, son of former Senator Prescott Bush and brother of Vice President George Bush (endorsed Weicker following convention)
- Robin Moore, author of The French Connection and The Green Berets (endorsed Bush)
- Bradford Peery, financial analyst

=== Campaign ===
Prescott Bush announced his challenge to Senator Weicker on January 14 at the Old State House. Though the Reagan-Bush White House remained aloof from his campaign, he centered his message on his support for Reagan's policies and Weicker's "maverick" reputation.

Bush drew controversy in early March at a meeting of the Greenwich Republican Women's Club in Weicker's hometown, when he commented with regard to illegal aliens: "I'm sure there are people in Greenwich who are glad they're here, because they wouldn't have someone to help in the house without them." Bush's campaign manager initially stated that the comment was "not in touch" and "didn't sound like Prescott Bush," but Bush himself latter admitted to saying it "jokingly" and expressed his concern that "there are a lot of these Mexicans, Colombians working in just about every community in the state."

In the first mid-March delegate election caucus in Fairfield, Bush swept all 17 delegates. Notably, the Fairfield caucus was the state's only one in which all registered Republicans could vote. Weicker's aides remarked the town was "Bush country," though they were surprised by the Senator's poor performance. Bush himself referred to the vote as "an overwhelming rejection" of Weicker. The Senator's campaign nonetheless suggested he would win "between 70 and 80 percent of the delegates at the convention." Polling also suggested that Weicker was the stronger candidate against Toby Moffett, the likely Democratic nominee.

Soon after, author Robin Moore withdrew from the race and endorsed Bush.

Late in the pre-convention race on July 17, state party chairman Ralph E. Capecelatro surprised many by endorsing Weicker on the grounds that Bush could not beat Moffett in November. Prior to his endorsement, many insiders believed Capecelatro was quietly supporting Bush. Soon thereafter, former party chair Jo McKenzie, who held an honorary position in the Bush campaign, endorsed Weicker as well, as did two former Bush campaign coordinators. The embrace by the party establishment came despite Weicker's long-standing feud with the state party and his denunciation of it as a "country club." Polling showed that Moffett led Bush by 12 points in the general election, but Bush called the contention that he could not win the election a "myth."

Heading into the convention, Senate Majority Leader Howard Baker stated that he would seek White House intervention if Bush were to win the convention, in order to prevent a primary.

=== Convention ===
Entering the convention, Weicker maintained his confidence that he would win the party endorsement but admitted that Bush would probably win the 20% necessary to force a September 7 primary contest. Bush described his chances of winning as "a long shot," but predicted he would be able to force a primary.

The keynote speaker was Governor Tom Kean of New Jersey, who encouraged unity and stressed support for President Reagan and "new federalism." Speeches for the candidates were delivered by Roger Eddy, state party treasurer, for Weicker and John O'Connell, a Hartford city councilman, for Bush. Eddy referred to Bush's candidacy as a "dangerous joke" and the convention as a "Republican trial, and inquisition." O'Connell denounced Weicker as a man who "constituently spurns both his President and his party" and "believes that we can best solve the problems of the 1980s through confrontation and obstruction."

July 24, 1982 Connecticut Republican Convention
Party	Candidate	Votes	%
Republican	Lowell Weicker (incumbent)	609	65.48%
Republican	Prescott Bush Jr.	321	34.52%
Total votes		930	100.00%

While Bush had lost the convention, he managed to easily surpass the 20% threshold needed for a September 7th primary against Weicker. Immediately following the convention vote, Bush said there was "no question" he would contest the primary. On July 25, the Bush campaign denounced an NBC Nightly News report of "informed sources" that Bush would withdraw, calling it "absolutely false". However, on July 27, Bush withdrew from the race to the surprise of his own supporters and opponents. He cited his desire to unify the Republican Party in advance of the general election. He had met with senior Republican Party officials after the convention, but denied pressure from the national party or the White House. Polls indicated that Bush led Weicker in a potential primary, but the race would have been expensive for both candidates and weakened the winner before facing Moffett.

== Democratic nomination ==
=== Candidates ===
- Toby Moffett, U.S. Representative from Unionville

=== Withdrew ===
- John T. Downey, Commissioner of the Connecticut Public Utility Control Authority and a former Central Intelligence Agency operative. He was shot down over China during the Korean War and was held prisoner for over twenty years.

== Results ==
General election results
Party	Candidate	Votes	%
Republican	Lowell Weicker (incumbent)	545,987	50.39%
Democratic	Toby Moffett	499,146	46.07%
Conservative	Lucien DiFazio	30,212	2.79%
Libertarian	James A. Lewis	8,163	0.75%
Republican hold			

== See also ==
- 1982 United States Senate elections
