= Gary Franks =

American politician (born 1953)

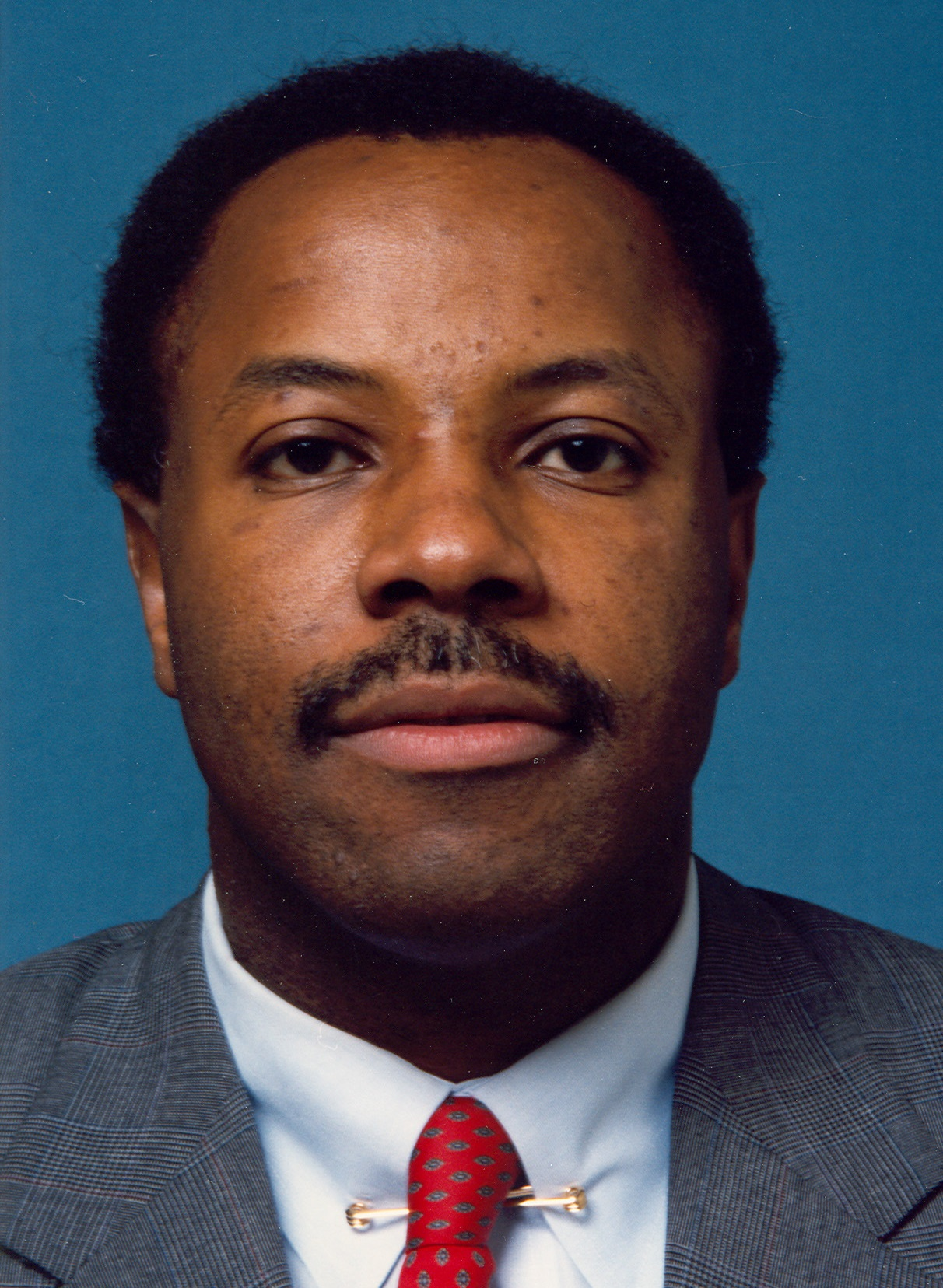

Member of the U.S. House of Representatives from Connecticut's 5th district
- In office January 3, 1991 – January 3, 1997
- Preceded by: John G. Rowland
- Succeeded by: James H. Maloney

Personal details
- Born: Gary Alvin Franks; February 9, 1953 (age 73) Waterbury, Connecticut, U.S.
- Party: Republican
- Spouse: Donna Williams
- Children: 3
- Education: Yale University (BA)

Gary Alvin Franks (born February 9, 1953) is an American politician who was a member of the U.S. House of Representatives from Connecticut for six years, from 1991 until 1997. He is the first African-American elected to the U.S. Congress from Connecticut, the first modern black conservative elected to the House of Representatives, and the first black Republican elected since Oscar De Priest's re-election in 1932. Franks ran for the United States Senate in 1998, losing to incumbent Democratic U.S. Senator Chris Dodd in a landslide. He currently hosts a podcast called We Speak Frankly, with his son Gary. He also writes for the Boston Herald.

== Early life ==
Franks was born in Waterbury, Connecticut. He is one of six children of a brass mill worker and a hospital dietary aide. He was elected president of his class at Sacred Heart High School.

Franks received his Bachelor of Arts from Yale University in 1975. He was captain of the basketball team and a free agent for the New Orleans Jazz NBA team.

After Yale, Franks worked in labor relations for 10 years at Continental Can Co., Chesebrough-Pond's Inc. and Cadbury Schweppes PLC.

== Career ==
Franks served as a member of the Waterbury board of aldermen from 1986 to 1990. He was an unsuccessful candidate for Comptroller of Connecticut in 1986.

=== U.S. House of Representatives ===
==== Elections ====
In his 1990 election, Franks defeated former 6th District congressman Toby Moffett, whom Franks portrayed as too liberal to represent the district. Both President George H. W. Bush and First Lady Barbara Bush campaigned for Franks.

Franks was the first African-American Republican elected to the House since Oscar Stanton De Priest, last elected from Chicago's South Side in 1932. A second African-American Republican member of the U.S. House, J. C. Watts from Oklahoma, also served during the 1990s.

In 1992, Franks won in a three-way election against Democratic candidate James Lawlor from Waterbury and A Connecticut Party candidate Lynn Taborsak from Danbury.

James H. Maloney, then the state senator for Danbury and a Democrat, challenged Franks in 1994, receiving 46% of the vote in that midterm election. Franks lost in a rematch to Maloney in 1996, as Connecticut also came out strongly for the re-election of President Bill Clinton.

==== Tenure ====
Franks served on the Armed Services Committee. During his tenure, more defense contracts were awarded in Connecticut than ever before, including production of the ‘Seawolf Submarine’ (a project that continued for more than a decade) and orders of the M16 rifle for Colt Manufacturing. He served as chairman of the Panel for Defense Conversion, and $20 million were approved for the demolition and cleanup of an old defense manufacturing site in his hometown of Waterbury. The site became home to what was, when it opened, New England's second-largest commercial mall.

Franks wrote the law that cemented Weir Farm National Historic Site in Ridgefield, Connecticut, as a place under the auspices of the National Park Service. He also authored the SBA's New Markets Program. It was not made law during his tenure, but most of its components were included in the Urban Entrepreneurial Opportunities law signed by President Clinton in 2000.

=== 1998 campaign for Senate ===
Frank's high visibility from his time in Congress led to speculation about a run for higher office. Franks declared his candidacy for U.S. Senate in 1998, challenging incumbent Senator Chris Dodd. He ran unopposed for the Republican nomination. Franks was defeated by Dodd in the election, receiving just 32 percent of the vote.

=== Subsequent career ===
In 1999, Franks founded and became a partner in the public affairs firm, Gary Alvin Associates, LLC based in Washington, DC. Franks has served as an adjunct professor at Georgetown University and is currently a visiting professor at Hampton University and the University of Virginia. He also served as president and chairman of Pacific Rim Trading & Investment Corp., a Fort Lauderdale group that recycles American scrap metal from America to China.

In 2010, 13 years after leaving Congress, Franks was profiled by the Waterbury newspaper, the Republican-American, in a piece detailing what the newspaper alleged were his history of unpaid debts, back taxes, and foreclosed properties. Although Franks was registered to vote in Waterbury, the article stated that he had not done so in 10 years, during which time he and his wife lived in Maryland and Florida under alternate versions of their legal names. Franks has contested the Republican-American's account. In an interview in September 2015, he stated: "Most of those things are lies. I've had the same name all my life. I have lived in my same residence for 12 years. I have visited and have lived in a little place in Florida for a year or so". Franks stated in the interview that rental properties that he had bought while he was a politician were burned down by the Ku Klux Klan, and that after he sued a hospital following the death of his sister, the "hospital has taken it upon itself to retaliate in this manner, working through one or two newspapers to spread these stories that are just so fictitious and so libelous, and so hateful".

In 2015, Franks was featured in the Wall Street Journal piece "Making the Republican Case for Black Support." Franks says, "Yes, you've got to show up but it's more than that. You've got to explain that participating in only one half of a [two-party] system doesn't work. You've got to show contrasts between what Democrats have done and what Republicans have done on issues like school choice and faith-based interventions."

=== Work as a syndicated columnist ===
Franks began writing opinion columns in 2020, which were published in outlets including Townhall and CT Mirror. He later became a nationally syndicated columnist with the Tribune Content Agency, where his weekly column on politics, government, and race relations is distributed to newspapers and media outlets in the United States and internationally.

== Political views ==
Franks ran as a candidate in favor of welfare reform and an opponent of affirmative action. He was a supporter of the nomination of Clarence Thomas to the Supreme Court. He opposed increased taxation and supported a reduced capital gains tax and an amendment to ban desecration of the American flag.

Franks opposed the Civil Rights Act of 1990. One of his claims was that it would enforce quotas that would encourage companies to move out of Connecticut to states with a greater proportion of whites. However, he did vote for the Civil Rights Act of 1991.

After becoming the first Republican voting member of the Congressional Black Caucus, Franks was ejected from the strategy sessions of the caucus on the claim he was a Republican mole.

During his time in Congress, Franks supported abortion rights. Years later, he changed his mind. In a 2022 Boston Herald column, Franks expressed concern particularly for black women, whom he considered to have a disproportionate number of abortions: "I supported the so-called pro-choice position while in Congress. These are votes I regret today and pray for God’s forgiveness on so many levels.... I implore the U.S. Supreme Court to do everything in its power to stop the madness. Socioeconomic reasons should not be justification to abort a pregnancy in America. We, as a society, are better than that."

== Personal life ==
Franks married Donna Williams in 1990; they have two daughters and a son. He is a Baptist.

In 2023, Franks submitted his congressional papers and personal handwritten diaries to Yale University's Beinecke Library, where they are held in its special collections. Franks also founded the Gary Franks Philanthropy Foundation. The organization states that its mission is to develop future leaders through promoting higher education and improving race relations.

== Books written ==
Franks is the author of several books. In 1996, he published Searching for the Promised Land: An African American's Optimistic Odyssey with ReganBooks, an imprint of HarperCollins. In 2016, he self-published two books, With God, For God and For Country: Because We Can Do Better and The Political Aberrations.

== See also ==
- List of African-American United States representatives
- List of African-American United States Senate candidates

Party political offices
Preceded by Susan Hutchinson	Republican nominee for Comptroller of Connecticut; 1986	Succeeded by Joel Schiavone
Preceded by Brook Johnson	Republican nominee for U.S. Senator from Connecticut (Class 3); 1998	Succeeded by Jack Orchulli
U.S. House of Representatives
Preceded by John G. Rowland	Member of the U.S. House of Representatives from Connecticut's 5th congressional district 1991–1997	Succeeded by James H. Maloney
U.S. order of precedence (ceremonial)
Preceded by Billy Lee Evans as Former U.S. Representative	Order of precedence of the United States as Former U.S. Representative	Succeeded by James H. Maloney as Former U.S. Representative
