= Bruce Morrison =

American politician (born 1944)

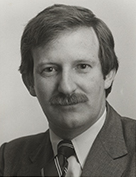
- Morrison in 1985

Director of the Federal Housing Finance Board
- In office 1995 – July 2000
- President: Bill Clinton
- Preceded by: William Perkins
- Succeeded by: Allan I. Mendelowitz

Member of the U.S. House of Representatives from Connecticut's 3rd district
- In office January 3, 1983 – January 3, 1991
- Preceded by: Larry DeNardis
- Succeeded by: Rosa DeLauro

Personal details
- Born: Bruce Andrew Morrison; October 8, 1944 (age 81) New York City, New York, U.S.
- Party: Democratic
- Spouse: Nancy Morrison
- Education: Massachusetts Institute of Technology (BS); University of Illinois, Urbana-Champaign (MS); Yale University (JD)

Bruce Andrew Morrison (born October 8, 1944) is an American attorney, lobbyist and Democratic Party politician who represented Connecticut in the United States House of Representatives from 1983 to 1991. In 1990, he was the unsuccessful Democratic nominee for Governor of Connecticut. As chair of the House Subcommittee on Immigration and Citizenship, he was a primary author of the Immigration Act of 1990, one of only two major immigration bills in United States history to increase legal immigration. He has been an advocate for Irish-American causes and American involvement in the Irish peace process, including acting as a key intermediary between Sinn Féin leader Gerry Adams and President Bill Clinton.

== Early life and education ==
Born in New York City, Morrison was adopted at a young age by George and Dorothea Morrison, who lived in Northport, Long Island. As a child, he attended public schools and graduated from Northport High School in 1962.

Morrison attended the Massachusetts Institute of Technology, and graduated in three years in 1965 with a degree in chemistry.

He received a master's degree in organic chemistry from the University of Illinois at Urbana-Champaign in 1970. At Illinois, he founded the Graduate Student Association as an advocacy organization for the over 8000 graduate students on campus. He was elected and re-elected as the first chairman of the group. In 1970, he worked as a special assistant to the dean of students.

Morrison received a J.D. from Yale Law School in 1973. Among his classmates were future president Bill Clinton, future Senator and Secretary of State Hillary Clinton, future ambassador to the United Nations John R. Bolton, future Supreme Court justice Clarence Thomas, and future U.S. Senator Richard Blumenthal. While at Yale Law School, he worked for Greater Boston Legal Services, the Natural Resources Defense Council, and New Haven Legal Assistance Association.

== Legal services career ==
In June 1973, Morrison became a staff attorney with New Haven Legal Assistance Association (LAA), one of the earliest programs to provide civil legal services to the poor. He was promoted to managing attorney a year late and became executive director in 1976. During his tenure at LAA, he was a mentor to many future litigators and judges. He was lead counsel in numerous successful class action cases based on federal Constitutional and statutory claims. He repeatedly argued in the Connecticut Appellate and Supreme Courts. He also lobbied on behalf of low income clients in the Connecticut legislature and helped draft landmark Landlord-Tenant reform legislation.

On a national level, Morrison was a leader of the Project Advisory Group representing the legal services programs from around the country. He advocated for these programs before the federal Legal Services Corporationa and the Congress, including the successful campaign that prevented the defunding of legal services proposed by President Ronald Reagan.

== U.S. Representative and campaign for Governor ==
In 1982, Morrison mounted a successful grass roots campaign for Congress in Connecticut's 3rd congressional district. He defeated the party-endorsed Democrat in a primary and then defeated Republican incumbent Larry DeNardis by 1,687 votes in the general election. After narrowly defeating DeNardis again in 1984, he won easy re-elections in 1986 and 1988.

Morrison was the first chairman of the Freshman Democratic Caucus of the 98th Congress. He was selected to serve on the House Banking Committee and the House Judiciary Committee, as well as the Veterans Affairs and DC Committees, and the Select Committee on Children, Youth, and Families. He was an expert on housing issues and authored numerous amendments to improve housing opportunities for the poor. He was deeply involved in human rights issues, visiting Cuba to demand the release of prisoners, Chile as part of a campaign to oust dictator Augusto Pinochet, South Africa to protest apartheid, Nicaragua to oppose aid to the Contras and Paraguay to observe elections after the overthrow of dictator Alfredo Stroessner. Morrison was a leader in efforts to reduce deficits and balance the federal budget. He was the Democratic sponsor of floor amendments to freeze spending in 1984 and 1985.

=== Immigration Act of 1990 ===
He served as chairman of the House Subcommittee on Immigration and Citizenship from 1989–1991. He was the House author of the Immigration Act of 1990, one of only two major immigration bills in the country's history to increase legal immigration. The legislation increased the focus of immigrant admission toward high skilled workers on the H1-B visa. In an interview with Bill Whitaker on CBS News' 60 Minutes broadcast on March 19, 2017, Morrison commented: "The H-1B has been hijacked as the main highway to bring people from abroad and displace American workers."

The bill also included a provision that became known as the Morrison visa program. It allotted 40,000 visas each year for three years to countries that had been disadvantaged by the 1965 immigration legislation. Immigrants from the Republic of Ireland and Northern Ireland were allotted with 40% (16,000) of the visas.

=== 1990 gubernatorial campaign ===
Morrison ran for governor of Connecticut in 1990. The incumbent Democratic Governor, William O'Neill, had become very unpopular due to years of state budget crises and chose not to seek re-election. Although Morrison defeated William Cibes in the Democratic primary, he finished a distant third in the general despite a sizable Democratic voter registration advantage, behind Republican John G. Rowland and the eventual winner, independent Lowell Weicker. Morrison could not overcome public dissatisfaction with the Democrats. After losing, he started his own law firm specializing in immigration law in New Haven, Connecticut.

== Clinton administration ==
In 1992, Morrison supported Bill Clinton's campaign by forming Irish Americans for Clinton-Gore, which recruited Clinton to support an activist agenda to assist in ending the Troubles in Northern Ireland. Clinton's pledges during the campaign became the basis of his work on the Irish Peace Process when in office. Morrison formed the Americans for a New Irish Agenda to support and encourage these efforts.

With Irish Voice publisher Niall O'Dowd, Morrison acted as a key intermediary between Gerry Adams, leader of the Sinn Féin party, the White House, and the Irish government led by Albert Reynolds. Morrison, O'Dowd, Bill Flynn (former CEO of Mutual of America Insurance Co.), philanthropist Chuck Feeney, and Joe Jamison and Bill Lenahan of the Irish American Labor Coalition were crucial in paving the way for Adams's controversial visa into the U.S. in February 1994 to address the National Committee on American Foreign Policy and for the Provisional Irish Republican Army's (IRA) ceasefire declaration of August 1994. Morrison continued to play an active role in the Peace Process throughout the 1990s and conducted negotiations leading to the renewed IRA ceasefire in 1997. Morrison's role in the peace process is detailed in the 2016 book Peacerunner written by Penn Rhodeen.

=== Federal Housing Finance Board ===
In 1995, he was appointed by President Bill Clinton to be the director of the Federal Housing Finance Board, an independent agency regulating the twelve Federal Home Loan Banks, a wholesale banking system with assets then in excess of $600 billion.

His work included the successful advocacy of the passage of the Federal Home Loan Bank Modernization Act of 1999, a bi-partisan effort which provided for new powers for the banks, devolution of management, and a modern risk-based capital structure. Under Morrison's leadership, the Finance Board also provided the banks with new business opportunities in housing, finance, and economic development through pilot programs and regulatory innovations. These changes were implemented through a regulatory agenda in the first six months of 2000.

== 2001 to present ==
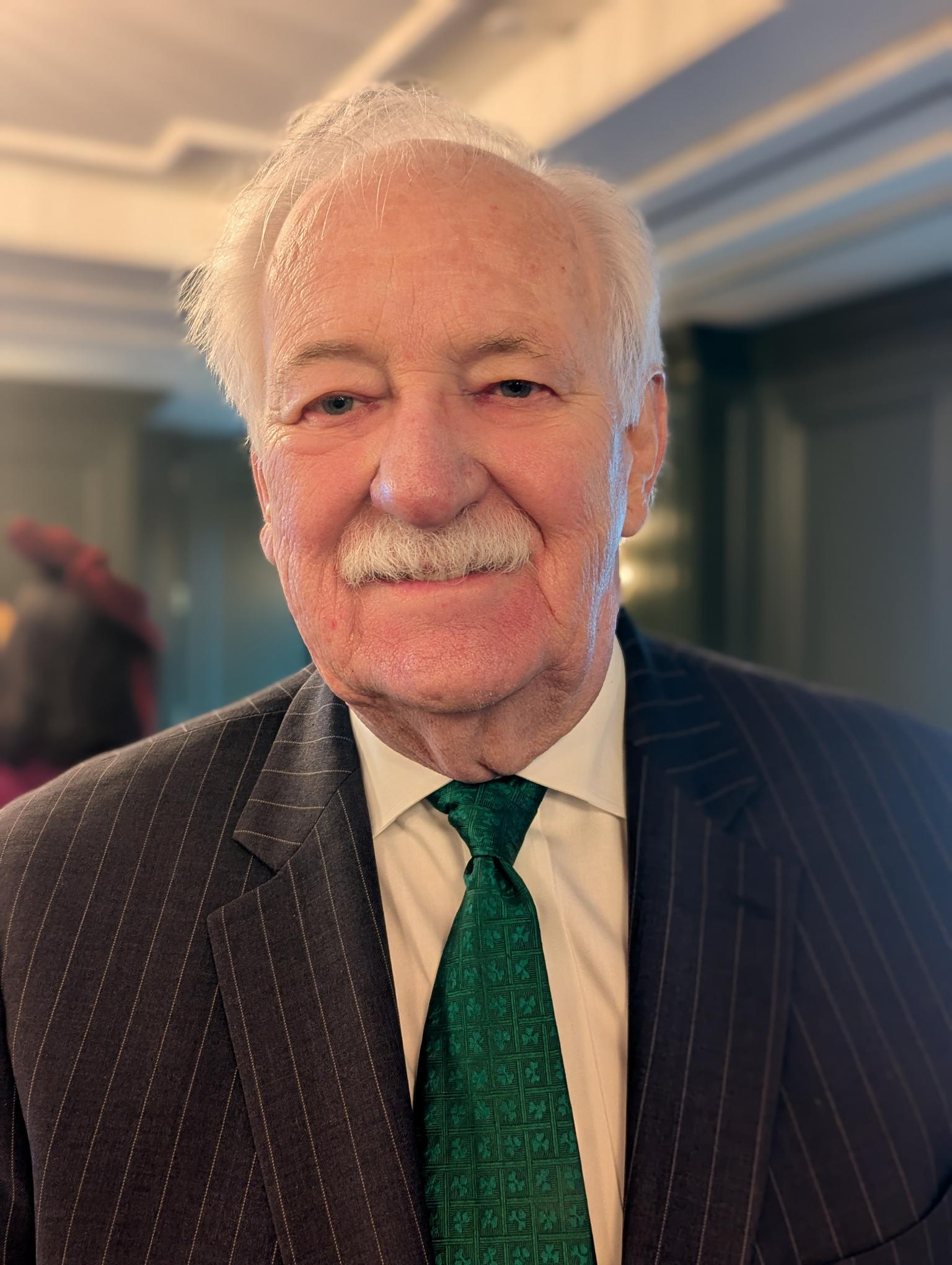
Photograph of Former Congressman Bruce Morrison in 2025

After leaving the Finance Board in July 2000, he founded the Morrison Public Affairs Group (MPAG), a Bethesda, Maryland-based lobbying firm. The firm specializes in financial services, housing finance, and immigration policy. Morrison also conducts an immigration law practice.

=== Irish-American causes ===
Morrison has remained active in Irish-American organizing and advocacy. He represented the Irish community on the National Democratic Ethnic Coordinating Committee, an official committee of the Democratic National Committee. He served as one of three Co-Convenors of the Council. In that role, he was a superdelegate at the 2016 Democratic National Convention, where he supported Hillary Clinton. He supported Representative Keith Ellison in his bid for DNC chairman.

In 2008, Morrison appeared at the National University of Ireland, Galway to participate in a debate on the 2008 U.S. Presidential election in support of Senator Barack Obama. His opponent was Grant Lally, head of Irish-Americans for John McCain.

In 2019, Morrison alongside a number of other Irish American political and civil society figures founded the bipartisan Ad Hoc Committee to Protect the Good Friday Agreement. He served as co-chair of the committee alongside fellow co-chair, Republican James Walsh.

=== Residence ===
He resides with his family in Bethesda, Maryland.

== Election results ==
Congressional elections

Year	Results
1982	Morrison 50% (D), DeNardis 49% (R), Fischman <1% (CPUSA)
1984	Morrison 52% (D), DeNardis 47% (R), Fischman <1% (CPUSA)
1986	Morrison 70% (D), Ernest J. Diette, Jr. 30% (R)
1988	Morrison 66% (D), Gerard B. Patton 34% (R)

Gubernatorial election

Year	Results
1990	Weicker 40% (A Connecticut Party), Rowland 38% (R), Morrison 20% (D), Independents 2%

U.S. House of Representatives
Preceded by Larry DeNardis	Member of the U.S. House of Representatives from Connecticut's 3rd congressional district 1983–1991	Succeeded by Rosa DeLauro
Party political offices
Preceded by William O'Neill	Democratic nominee for Governor of Connecticut; 1990	Succeeded by Bill Curry
U.S. order of precedence (ceremonial)
Preceded by Toby Moffett as Former U.S. Representative	Order of precedence of the United States as Former U.S. Representative	Succeeded by Chester G. Atkins as Former U.S. Representative
