= John G. Rowland =

American politician (born 1957)

John Rowland
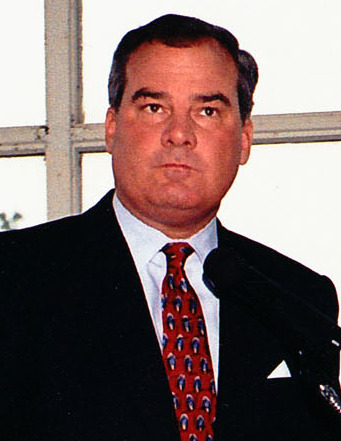

86th Governor of Connecticut
- In office January 4, 1995 – July 1, 2004
- Lieutenant: Jodi Rell
- Preceded by: Lowell Weicker
- Succeeded by: Jodi Rell

Member of the U.S. House of Representatives from Connecticut's 5th district
- In office January 3, 1985 – January 3, 1991
- Preceded by: William R. Ratchford
- Succeeded by: Gary Franks

Member of the Connecticut House of Representatives from the 73rd district
- In office January 7, 1981 – January 3, 1985
- Preceded by: Natalie Rapoport
- Succeeded by: Joan Hartley

Personal details
- Born: John Grosvenor Rowland; May 24, 1957 (age 69) Waterbury, Connecticut, U.S.
- Party: Republican
- Spouses: Deborah Nabhan (divorced); Patty Largay (m. 1994)
- Children: 5
- Education: Villanova University (BS)

John Grosvenor Rowland (born May 24, 1957) is an American former politician, author, and radio host who served as the 86th governor of Connecticut from 1995 to 2004.

Rowland served three terms representing Connecticut's 5th congressional district in the United States House of Representatives from 1985 to 1991. A Republican, he was the first Connecticut governor to be elected to more than two terms since Wilbur Cross, who was elected to four consecutive terms in the 1930s. In July 2004, Rowland resigned from office amid a corruption investigation, and later pleaded guilty in federal court to a one-count indictment for conspiracy to commit honest services fraud, mail fraud and tax fraud. His lieutenant governor, Jodi Rell, replaced him as governor. Rowland served ten months in a federal prison until February 2006, followed by four months' house arrest at his home in West Hartford until June 2006.

In 2014, Rowland was indicted on seven counts for his role in an election fraud case where former congressional candidate Lisa Wilson-Foley, current vice chair of the Bushnell Center for the Performing Arts and her husband, Brian Foley, pleaded guilty in federal court on March 31, 2014, to illegally paying Rowland $35,000 in campaign consulting fees. He was charged with two counts of falsifying records in a federal investigation, one count of conspiracy, two counts of causing false statements to be made to the FEC, and two counts of causing illegal campaign contributions. He was convicted on all seven counts in September 2014, and was subsequently sentenced to 30 months in prison in 2015. He was released in 2018. President Donald Trump pardoned him in 2025.

== Early life and education ==
Rowland was born May 24, 1957 in Waterbury, Connecticut, the oldest of five children, to Sherwood L. Rowland (died 2000), an insurance agent, and Florence "Cerie" Rowland (née Jackson; 1931–2017). He has four younger siblings; Ned Rowland, Henry Rowland, Marnie Crawford (née Rowland) and Skip Rowland.

He attended Kingsbury Elementary School (K-8) and graduated from Holy Cross High School, a private high school, in Waterbury, Connecticut. Rowland received a Bachelor of Science from Villanova University in 1979.

== Career ==
=== Politics ===
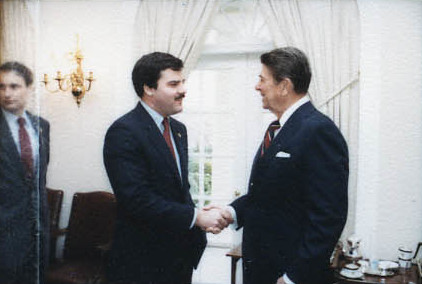
Rowland greeting President Ronald Reagan in 1984

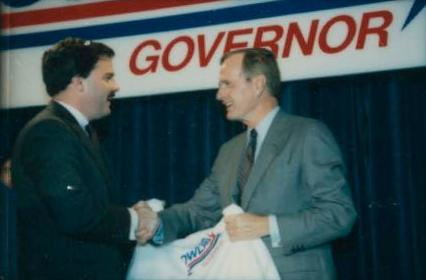
Rowland greeting President George H. W. Bush in 1990

Rowland's political career began in 1980 when, at age 23, he was elected to the Connecticut State House of Representatives. He held his seat until 1984, when he was elected to represent Connecticut's 5th congressional district in the United States House of Representatives and was reelected in 1986 and 1988.

=== Consulting ===
After losing the 1990 gubernatorial race to Lowell Weicker, Rowland worked as a consultant for United Technologies Corp.

=== Tenure as Governor ===
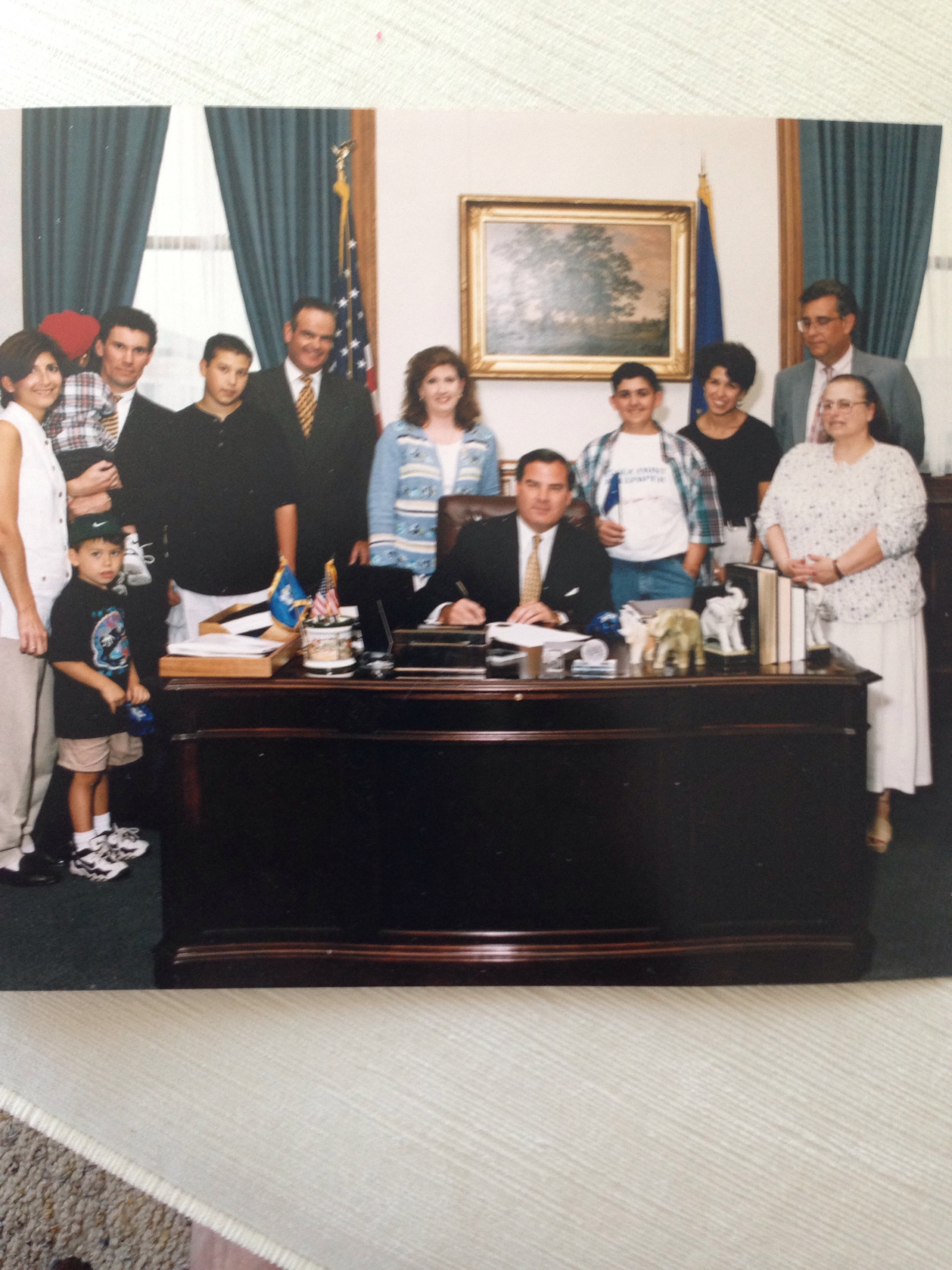
Governor John Rowland (CT) signing Proclamation making September Childhood Cancer Awareness Month

Rowland was later elected governor in 1994 at age 37 (the youngest governor in Connecticut history) and later defeated two Democratic opponents: former US Congresswoman Barbara Kennelly (63%–35%) in 1998 and former State Comptroller Bill Curry (56%–44%) in 2002.

The Adriaen's Landing project, the most ambitious capital city development project in decades in the state, continued to progress during Rowland's time in office. On Rowland's watch the state paid $37 million to TBI Construction to relocate Connecticut Natural Gas headquarters to East Hartford to make room for the development, TBI would later be at the center of the scandal that brought the Governor down.

In 1997 Rowland was the subject of the Geargate political scandal. Surplus military equipment intended for the Connecticut State Police was diverted by Rowland and close associates for their personal use. Equipment and apparel including sleeping bags, camouflage jackets, helmets, and a bayonet made their way into the hands of Rowland's children, his staff, his security detail, and the husband of then Lt. Gov. Jodi Rell. The diversion was organized by corrupt State Trooper Eugene D’Angelo and was uncovered through a joint State Police and Department of Defense investigation.

In 1998, Rowland implemented the HUSKY Plan (Healthcare for UninSured Kids and Youth) to provide health insurance to uninsured Connecticut children. During his tenure, the budget for the Department of Children and Families more than doubled. Rowland supported addition to government of the state's first Child Advocate.

Rowland was a strong proponent of a tough stance against violent crime as governor. The prison population grew rapidly during his term, which caused the state to send inmates to prisons in Virginia to deal with overcrowding. Legislative opponents of this policy such as Representative Michael Lawlor urged more rapid release of nonviolent offenders. After Rowland left office the Virginia inmates were returned to Connecticut and more criminals were paroled. This approach was criticized after the 2007 Cheshire home invasion murders committed by two "nonviolent" inmates paroled from Connecticut prison.

In early 1998, Rowland outlined plans to make Hartford an educational, cultural, and entertainment center. He outlined a "Six Pillars of Progress" initiative, which included the construction of a convention center, a higher education center, parking garages, housing, riverfront redevelopment, and the renovation of the Hartford Civic Center. By May 1998, the Connecticut General Assembly had authorized an initial $300 million to implement his urban renewal plan. Rowland established the Capital City Economic Development Authority, a quasi-state entity to oversee the implementation of his plan. Projects completed under this plan included the construction of Adriaen's Landing and other work on improving the riverfront, renovation of the former G. Fox & Co. department store so that it could house the new location of Capital Community College, and the Connecticut Convention Center.

In 2002 Lawrence Alibozek, former deputy chief of staff to the Governor, pleaded guilty to steering State contracts to the Tomasso Group, a contractor heavily involved with Rowland and his campaigns. The Tomasso Group's relationship with Rowland included more than $500,000 in legal campaign contributions as well as hosting the Governor's birthday at their Tunxis Country Club.

In 2003 Governor Rowland dismissed 2,800 state workers thus violating their union contracts. The 2nd U.S. Circuit Court of Appeals in New York City ruled in 2013 that the former Republican governor's administration had violated the workers right to freedom of association. Many workers were eventually rehired or otherwise partially compensated. "They lost benefits, they lost pension, they lost health insurance," creating "real interference" with people's lives, said Union Attorney David Golub.

Before investigation into his conduct as governor started, Rowland was viewed as a rising star in the Republican Party, and was mentioned as a future presidential or vice-presidential candidate.

Rowland resigned abruptly as governor, July 1, 2004, as he faced impeachment and investigation for corruption. Lieutenant Governor M. Jodi Rell served out the remainder of his term. Rowland is the first Connecticut governor to have ever faced impeachment and he is the only Connecticut governor to have served prison time.

== Corruption case ==
=== Resignation amid the threat of impeachment ===
In the first year of Rowland's third term (2003), rumors began circulating that contractors doing business with the state, primarily the Tomasso Group, paid for and made improvements to his private weekend home. Rowland initially denied the allegations, but in December 2003, he abruptly appeared on television and admitted that work had been done by contractors on his vacation home at no charge, and that his earlier statements to the contrary were untrue. He claimed that, since the work was done, he had paid the contractors in full; but in January 2004 an official investigation began into charges of corruption and whether he should face impeachment.

On June 18, the Connecticut Supreme Court required Rowland to appear before the investigative panel seeking his testimony, which could have resulted in him giving evidence against impeachment in the ongoing criminal investigation. On June 21, Rowland resigned, effective noon on July 1, 2004, amid a strong likelihood of impeachment.

=== Patty Rowland's poem ===
Matters were exacerbated when the First Lady of Connecticut, Patty Rowland, wrote a satirical poem deriding the media for investigating her husband's wrongdoing. The poem, a parody of the classic A Visit From St. Nicholas, was read by the First Lady at the Middlesex Chamber of Commerce on Dec. 17, 2003. The poem was published in its entirety in the New York Times the following day.

=== Conviction ===
On December 23, 2004, Rowland pleaded guilty to depriving the public of honest service. Rowland was sentenced on March 18, 2005, in New Haven, Connecticut, to one year and one day in prison, four months' house arrest, three years' probation and community service. On April 1, 2005, he entered Federal Correctional Institution, Loretto, in Pennsylvania. His federal inmate number was 15623-014.

=== After release ===
On February 10, 2006, Rowland was released from federal prison with the stipulation that he serve four months' house arrest with an electronic ankle bracelet monitor.

On July 1, 2006, Rowland spoke to an association of scholar athletes in Kingston, Rhode Island, about the lessons he learned. A "sense of entitlement" and the "arrogance of power" were two of the biggest things that ended his political career, The Hartford Courant quoted him as saying.

He warned that the arrogance is very easy when you're put on a pedestal, and you "start to believe your own press releases. ... It [becomes] all about me. You start to block out what else is around you."

The Courant quoted Rowland as saying that "when you start to find yourself only concerned with yourself" that's the point when you need to find a "grounding force." That should be faith, ideally, he said, or at least "something within yourself"—not just other people.

"I found in my career that a lot of people will tell you how great you are—especially when you're the boss. But there will be that time when that career will be over ... and then it's down to the three F's—faith, family and friends – real faith, real family and real friends."

Rowland, now a resident of West Hartford, told the audience his future is still uncertain. He owes the Internal Revenue Service more than $35,000 and another $40,000 in fines. He said he's a volunteer counselor and hoping to find a publisher for a book he wrote called Falling Into Grace.

In September 2006, local TV station WTNH, reported that Patty Rowland had purchased a house in Middlebury, Connecticut, and the Rowland family would be moving to that town.

Rowland discussed his life after politics in a Washington Post article published June 17, 2007. Rowland discussed his work on the lecture circuit and the factors leading to his political demise. He also expressed disappointment that his successor, Governor M. Jodi Rell, had "thrown him under the bus" and distanced herself from him after taking office. Rell declined to criticize Rowland over these remarks.

In January 2008, Waterbury Republican Mayor Michael Jarjura announced that he would hire Rowland as an economic development advisor for the city. Rowland began work in February and received an annual salary of $95,000 as the city's economic development coordinator. Rowland's stint as Waterbury's economic development coordinator ended in 2012.

=== Radio show ===
From 2010 until 2014, Rowland hosted the afternoon show on Hartford's WTIC (1080).

On April 1, 2014, Connecticut governor Dannel P. Malloy called on WTIC to remove Rowland from the air due to Rowland's implication in a corruption scandal involving former Congressional candidate Lisa Wilson-Foley. Malloy stated: "The reality is that we now know enough—two people have pled guilty to this charge and have identified the party they were engaged with ... unless there's going to be a denial and in light of two actual pleas, both identifying who the third party was, I think any reasonable outlet would remove him at this point […] He had the interesting position of trying to impact and influence political discourse on an afternoon radio show. That somebody would violate that trust as well is disturbing." Rowland has often criticized Malloy since the latter took office in 2011. On one occasion, Rowland labeled Malloy a "pathological liar," although he later apologized to Malloy.

On April 3, 2014, just before 6 p.m. at the end of his regular three-hour time slot, Rowland announced that he was leaving as WTIC's afternoon talk-show host "to take care of some personal issues".

== Wilson-Foley campaign ==
On March 31, 2014, husband and wife Brian and Lisa Wilson-Foley, the Vice Chair of the Bushnell Center for the Performing Arts Board of Trustees, pleaded guilty in federal court to corruption charges for illegally paying and afterwards hiding campaign consulting fees to the former governor, who is widely considered the main target for the federal probers. In 2012, Wilson-Foley ran for Congress in Connecticut 5th district. Rowland secretly served as a consultant to her campaign.

On September 8, Lisa Wilson-Foley's husband, Brian Foley, told the jury that his wife had signed a fictional contract with Rowland to create the impression that Rowland was working for a group of nursing homes Foley owned. Instead, Rowland was providing political advice. Despite the statement, Rowland's lawyers insisted that the client was a campaign volunteer and that he was paid for giving Foley advice on his healthcare business, not for being a political consultant. Shortly thereafter on September 16, first defense witness Bedard testified in accord with this line of defense. Bedard claims directly countered prosecutor's charges: "The healthcare and nursing home industry was changing and Brian hired him as a consultant to help us move forward," Bedard testified: "The healthcare and nursing home industry was changing and Brian [Foley] hired him [Rowland] as a consultant to help us move forward. ... He knew the politics and practical ways to speed along Medicaid payments that were often delayed by between nine months to a year."

On September 19, 2014, Rowland was convicted on federal charges that he conspired to hide payment for his work on two congressional campaigns. He was convicted in New Haven federal court on all seven counts, including conspiracy, falsifying records in a federal investigation, causing false statements to be made to the Federal Election Commission, and causing illegal campaign contributions. On March 18, 2015, Rowland was sentenced to prison for 30 months by U.S. District Judge Janet Bond Arterton. Judge Arterton also fined Rowland $35,000 and ordered him to serve three years of supervision by the federal probation office upon his release. Rowland turned down the opportunity to speak and appealed the sentence. His conviction was upheld by the 2nd U.S. Circuit Court of Appeals in New York City on June 17, 2016. Rowland served less than the full 30-month term and was released from federal custody on May 26, 2018.

President Donald Trump pardoned Rowland on May 28, 2025.

== Electoral history ==
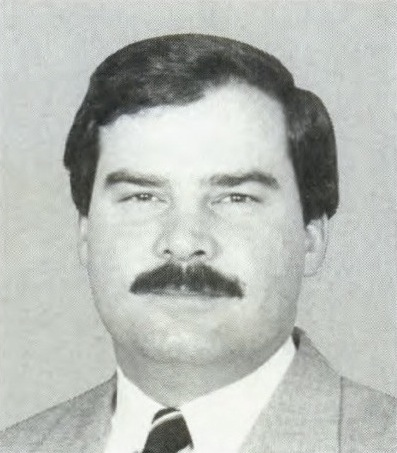
Rowland during the 101st Congress

Connecticut Gubernatorial Election 1990
Party	Candidate	Votes	%	±%
A Connecticut Party (1990)	Lowell Weicker	460,576	40.36	
Republican	John Rowland	427,840	37.49	
Democratic	Bruce Morrison	236,641	20.74	

Connecticut Gubernatorial Election 1994
Party	Candidate	Votes	%	±%
Republican	John Rowland	415,201	36.20	
Democratic	Bill Curry	375,133	32.70	
A Connecticut Party (1990)	Eunice Strong Groark	216,585	18.88	
Independent	Tom Scott	130,128	11.34	

Connecticut Gubernatorial Election 1998
Party	Candidate	Votes	%	±%
Republican	John Rowland (incumbent)	628,707	62.90	
Democratic	Barbara Kennelly	354,187	35.44	

Connecticut Gubernatorial Election 2002
Party	Candidate	Votes	%	±%
Republican	John Rowland (incumbent)	573,958	56.11	
Democratic	Bill Curry	448,984	43.89	

== Personal life ==
Rowland was first married to Deborah Joan Nabhan (born 1958), with whom he had daughters Kristen and Julianne. In 1994, Rowland who was then a 12-day governor elect, married his high school sweetheart Patricia Largay (née Oemcke), on Block Island, Rhode Island.

Rowland resided in Middlebury, Connecticut. In 2022, he purchased a historic Waterside Lane home in Clinton, Connecticut, which is listed on the National Register of Historic Places for $800,000.

== See also ==
- List of people granted executive clemency in the second Trump presidency

U.S. House of Representatives
Preceded by William R. Ratchford	Member of the U.S. House of Representatives from Connecticut's 5th congressional district 1985–1991	Succeeded by Gary Franks
Honorary titles
Preceded by Chris Perkins	Baby of the House; 1985–1990	Succeeded by Susan Molinari
Party political offices
Preceded by Julie Belaga	Republican nominee for Governor of Connecticut; 1990, 1994, 1998, 2002	Succeeded by Jodi Rell
Preceded by Tom Ridge	Chair of the Republican Governors Association; 2001–2002	Succeeded by Bill Owens
Political offices
Preceded by Lowell Weicker	Governor of Connecticut; 1995–2004	Succeeded by Jodi Rell
U.S. order of precedence (ceremonial)
Preceded by Martha McSally as Former U.S. Senator	Order of precedence of the United States; Within Connecticut	Succeeded by Dan Malloy as Former Governor
Preceded by Nathan Deal as Former Governor	Order of precedence of the United States; Outside Connecticut	Succeeded by Dan Malloy as Former Governor
