= Tom Scott (Connecticut politician) =

American politician (born 1958)

Thomas Scott
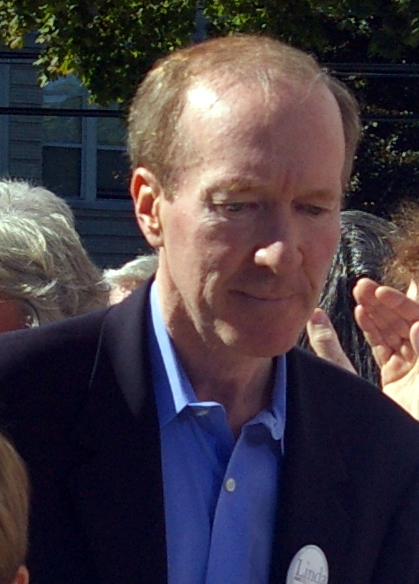
- Scott in 2010

Member of the Connecticut State Senate from the 14th district
- In office January 7, 1981 – January 9, 1991
- Preceded by: John D. Prete
- Succeeded by: Max S. Case

Personal details
- Born: April 21, 1958 (age 68) Connecticut
- Occupation: Politician; radio show host; realtor

Thomas Scott (born April 21, 1958) is an American politician, radio talk show host, and realtor.

== Life and career ==
Born in 1958, Scott attended Southern Connecticut State University but did not graduate.

He was first elected to the Connecticut Senate in 1980, becoming at 22 the youngest state senator ever seated. He served in the Senate from 1981 to 1991 as a Republican from Milford.

Scott was known for his vehement opposition to the income tax and led a protest of 40,000 people against it in 1991.

He sought a seat in the United States House of Representatives from Connecticut's 3rd congressional district in 1990, losing to Democrat Rosa DeLauro. He then founded the Connecticut Taxpayers Committee. Scott faced DeLauro in a re-match in 1992 and lost again.

After leaving the state legislature, he worked as a real estate broker and, starting in 1993, a radio talk show host for WPOP. He contested the 1994 Connecticut gubernatorial election as an independent and lost. In January 1995, Scott returned to radio, hosting a show on WTIC; he subsequently moved to WELI. He hosted the radio show Off Center with Roger Vann, until Vann left the station in 1999.

In July 2008, Scott rejoined WELI. That October, he interviewed United States Senator Chris Dodd. WELI chose not to air the interview due to disagreements between co-host and producer Ryan Gorman and Scott, which led to Scott leaving the station. WERC in Birmingham, Alabama, another Clear Channel Communications affiliate station, later posted the interview to its website.

In 2011, Scott aided the successful state Senate campaign of Len Suzio. He joined Linda McMahon's second U.S. Senate campaign in February 2012.

As of 2024, Scott is a realtor in Milford, Connecticut.
