= A Connecticut Party =

Political party in Connecticut

- Leader: Lowell Weicker
- Founded: 1990
- Dissolved: 1998
- Split from: Republican Party
- Headquarters: Greenwich, Connecticut
- Ideology: Social liberalism
- Political position: Center-left
- Colors: Orange

A Connecticut Party was a political party formed by former Republican senator and gubernatorial candidate Lowell Weicker in 1990. Weicker announced his run for Connecticut governor as a third-party candidate on March 2, 1990. On April 16, he formally unveiled the name of his party as A Connecticut Party. Weicker subsequently won the 1990 gubernatorial election and served a single term as governor of Connecticut, becoming the first third party Connecticut governor to be elected in 134 years. The party was intentionally named to fall alphabetically first on the ballot among the minor parties, with the Republican and Democratic parties not listed alphabetically.

In 1992 the party held its first convention with 350 delegates attending. At the convention the party endorsed more than 100 candidates for the General Assembly (about 80 Democrats, 16 A Connecticut Party candidates and a "handful of Republicans").

Lowell’s lieutenant governor was Eunice Groark, the first third party candidate to become lieutenant governor since Roger Averill was elected to his fourth term in 1865. In 1994, Groark attempted to carry the ACP banner into the governor's race, but was defeated, finishing third with 18.9% of the vote. In other races for statewide or federal office, the party mostly endorsed Democrats including incumbents Joe Lieberman for US Senate, Richard Blumenthal for attorney general, Joseph M. Suggs Jr. for state treasurer, and Barbara B. Kennelly for representative in the 1st congressional district. The party also endorsed the Democratic Party candidacies of state representative Miles S. Rapoport for secretary of state, and Charlotte Koskoff for representative in the 6th congressional district. In the 2nd congressional district the party ran its own candidate, David Bingham, who finished third in a three-way race with 14.90%. However, without its own statewide officeholder, the party faded from view by the late 1990s. The party stopped running its own candidates in 1998.

One of its chairs was Diane Blick.

Starting in 2021, there has been an ongoing effort to revive the party in West Hartford. However, this new party of the same name shares no legal relation to A Connecticut Party.
