= Political party strength in Connecticut =

Politics in the US state of Connecticut

The following table indicates the party of elected officials in the U.S. state of Connecticut:

- Governor
- Lieutenant Governor
- Secretary of the State
- Attorney General
- State Treasurer
- State Comptroller

The table also indicates the historical party composition in the:

- State Senate
- State House of Representatives
- State delegation to the U.S. Senate
- State delegation to the U.S. House of Representatives

For years in which a presidential election was held, the table indicates which party's nominees received the state's electoral votes.

== 1639–1775 ==
Year	Executive offices				
Year	Governor of the Connecticut Colony	Governor of the New Haven Colony	Deputy Governor of the Connecticut Colony	Secretary of State	Treasurer
1639	John Haynes	Theophilus Eaton	Roger Ludlow	Edward Hopkins	Thomas Welles
1640	Edward Hopkins	Theophilus Eaton	John Haynes	Edward Hopkins	Thomas Welles
1641	John Haynes	Theophilus Eaton	George Wyllys	Thomas Welles	William Whiting
1642	George Wyllys	Theophilus Eaton	Roger Ludlow	Thomas Welles	William Whiting
1643	John Haynes	Theophilus Eaton	Edward Hopkins	Thomas Welles	William Whiting
1644	Edward Hopkins	Theophilus Eaton	John Haynes	Thomas Welles	William Whiting
1645	John Haynes	Theophilus Eaton	Edward Hopkins	Thomas Welles	William Whiting
1646	Edward Hopkins	Theophilus Eaton	John Haynes	Thomas Welles	William Whiting
1647	John Haynes	Theophilus Eaton	Edward Hopkins	Thomas Welles	William Whiting
1648	Edward Hopkins	Theophilus Eaton	Roger Ludlow	John Cullick	Thomas Welles
1649	John Haynes	Theophilus Eaton	Edward Hopkins	John Cullick	Thomas Welles
1650	Edward Hopkins	Theophilus Eaton	John Haynes	John Cullick	Thomas Welles
1651	John Haynes	Theophilus Eaton	Edward Hopkins	John Cullick	Thomas Welles
1652	Edward Hopkins	Theophilus Eaton	John Haynes	John Cullick	John Talcott Sr.
1653	John Haynes	Theophilus Eaton	Edward Hopkins	John Cullick	John Talcott Sr.
1654	Edward Hopkins	Theophilus Eaton	Thomas Welles	John Cullick	John Talcott Sr.
1655	Thomas Welles	Theophilus Eaton	John Webster	John Cullick	John Talcott Sr.
1656	John Webster	Theophilus Eaton	Thomas Welles	John Cullick	John Talcott Sr.
1657	John Winthrop the Younger	Theophilus Eaton	Thomas Welles	John Cullick	John Talcott Sr.
1658	Thomas Welles	Francis Newman	John Winthrop the Younger	Daniel Clark	John Talcott Sr.
1659	John Winthrop the Younger	Francis Newman	John Winthrop the Younger	Daniel Clark	John Talcott Sr.
1660	John Winthrop the Younger	Francis Newman	John Mason	Daniel Clark	John Talcott Jr.
1661–1663	John Winthrop the Younger	William Leete (Note: The Colony of Connecticut and the Colony of New Haven merged by Royal Charter in 1662 and became one government.)	John Mason	Daniel Clark	John Talcott Jr.
1664	John Winthrop the Younger	William Leete	John Mason	John Allyn	John Talcott Jr.
1665	John Winthrop the Younger	William Leete	John Mason	Daniel Clark	John Talcott Jr.
1666	John Winthrop the Younger (Note: Was governor of the combined Connecticut Colony in 1662. However, the regime change did not include an election for governor; Winthrop was merely retained in his position. The merger took three years to complete, during which time William Leete remained in New Haven.)		John Mason	Daniel Clark	John Talcott Jr.
1667–1668	John Winthrop the Younger		John Mason	John Allyn	John Talcott Jr.
1669–1675	John Winthrop the Younger		William Leete	John Allyn	John Talcott Jr.
1676–1678	William Leete		Robert Treat	John Allyn	William Pitkin
1679–1682	William Leete		Robert Treat	John Allyn	Joseph Whiting
1683–1686	Robert Treat (Note: De jure 1683–1698; de facto 1683–1687.)		James Bishop	John Allyn	Joseph Whiting
1687–1688	Robert Treat	Edmund Andros (Note: De facto; as part of the Dominion of New England.)	James Bishop	John Allyn	Joseph Whiting
1689–1691	Robert Treat		James Bishop	John Allyn	Joseph Whiting
1692–1695	Robert Treat		William Jones	John Allyn	Joseph Whiting
1696–1697	Robert Treat		William Jones	Eleazer Kimberly	Joseph Whiting
1698–1707	Fitz-John Winthrop		Robert Treat	Eleazer Kimberly	Joseph Whiting
1708	Gurdon Saltonstall		Nathan Gold	Eleazer Kimberly	Joseph Whiting
1709	Gurdon Saltonstall		Nathan Gold	William Whiting	Joseph Whiting
1709	Gurdon Saltonstall		Nathan Gold	Caleb Stanly	Joseph Whiting
1710–1711	Gurdon Saltonstall		Nathan Gold	Caleb Stanly	Joseph Whiting
1712	Gurdon Saltonstall		Nathan Gold	Richard Lord	Joseph Whiting
1712	Gurdon Saltonstall		Nathan Gold	Hezekiah Wyllys	Joseph Whiting
1713–1717	Gurdon Saltonstall		Nathan Gold	Hezekiah Wyllys	Joseph Whiting
1718–1723	Gurdon Saltonstall		Nathan Gold	Hezekiah Wyllys	John Whiting
1724	Joseph Talcott		Joseph Talcott	Hezekiah Wyllys	John Whiting
1725–1734	Joseph Talcott		Jonathan Law	Hezekiah Wyllys	John Whiting
1735–1740	Joseph Talcott		Jonathan Law	George Wyllys	John Whiting
1741–1749	Jonathan Law		Roger Wolcott	George Wyllys	John Whiting
1750–1753	Roger Wolcott		Thomas Fitch	George Wyllys	Nathaniel Stanly
1754–1755	Thomas Fitch		William Pitkin	George Wyllys	Nathaniel Stanly
1756–1765	Thomas Fitch		William Pitkin	George Wyllys	Joseph Talcott
1766–1768	William Pitkin		Jonathan Trumbull	George Wyllys	Joseph Talcott
1769–1775	Jonathan Trumbull		Matthew Griswold	George Wyllys	John Lawrence

== 1776–1898 ==
Year	Executive offices					General Assembly		United States Congress			Electoral votes
Year	Governor	Lt. Governor	Secretary of State	Treasurer	Comptroller	State Senate	State House	U.S. Senator (Class I)	U.S. Senator (Class III)	U.S. House	Electoral votes
1776	Jonathan Trumbull (I) (Note: In 1776; the royal government was discarded for state government without a gubernatorial election.)	Matthew Griswold (F)	George Wyllys	John Lawrence							
...	Jonathan Trumbull (I)	Matthew Griswold (F)	George Wyllys	John Lawrence							
1783	Jonathan Trumbull (I)	Matthew Griswold (F)	George Wyllys	John Lawrence							
1784	Matthew Griswold (F)	Samuel Huntington (F)	George Wyllys	John Lawrence							
1785	Matthew Griswold (F)	Samuel Huntington (F)	George Wyllys	John Lawrence							
1786	Samuel Huntington (F) (Note: Died in office.)	Oliver Wolcott (F)	George Wyllys	John Lawrence							
1787	Samuel Huntington (F)	Oliver Wolcott (F)	George Wyllys	John Lawrence							
1788	Samuel Huntington (F)	Oliver Wolcott (F)	George Wyllys	John Lawrence							
1789	Samuel Huntington (F)	Oliver Wolcott (F)	George Wyllys	Jedediah Huntington		F majority	F majority	Oliver Ellsworth (PA)	William S. Johnson (PA)	5PA	Washington/ Adams (I) ✓
1790	Samuel Huntington (F)	Oliver Wolcott (F)	George Wyllys	Peter Colt		F majority	F majority	Oliver Ellsworth (PA)	William S. Johnson (PA)	5PA	Washington/ Adams (I) ✓
1791	Samuel Huntington (F)	Oliver Wolcott (F)	George Wyllys	Peter Colt		F majority	F majority	Oliver Ellsworth (PA)	William S. Johnson (PA)	5PA	Washington/ Adams (I) ✓
1792	Samuel Huntington (F)	Oliver Wolcott (F)	George Wyllys	Peter Colt		F majority	F majority	Oliver Ellsworth (PA)	Roger Sherman (PA)	5PA	Washington/ Adams (I) ✓
1793	Samuel Huntington (F)	Oliver Wolcott (F)	George Wyllys	Peter Colt		F majority	F majority	Oliver Ellsworth (PA)	Roger Sherman (PA)	7PA	Washington/ Adams (I) ✓
1794	Samuel Huntington (F)	Oliver Wolcott (F)	George Wyllys	Andrew Kingsbury (F)		F majority	F majority	Oliver Ellsworth (PA)	Stephen Mix Mitchell (PA)	7PA	Washington/ Adams (I) ✓
1795	Samuel Huntington (F)	Oliver Wolcott (F)	George Wyllys	Andrew Kingsbury (F)		F majority	F majority	Oliver Ellsworth (F)	Jonathan Trumbull Jr. (F)	7F	Washington/ Adams (I) ✓
1796	Oliver Wolcott (F) (Note: As lieutenant governor, filled unexpired term, and was later elected in their own right.)	Jonathan Trumbull Jr. (F)	Samuel Wyllys (F)	Andrew Kingsbury (F)		F majority	F majority	James Hillhouse (F)	Uriah Tracy (F)	7F	Adams ✓ / T. Pinckney (F) ✗ (Note: Prior to the 12th Amendment to the U.S. Constitution, the vice president was the candidate with the second most electoral votes, thus Thomas Jefferson, the Democratic-Republican candidate for president was elected vice-president.)
1797	Oliver Wolcott (F)	Jonathan Trumbull Jr. (F)	Samuel Wyllys (F)	Andrew Kingsbury (F)		F majority	F majority	James Hillhouse (F)	Uriah Tracy (F)	7F	Adams ✓ / T. Pinckney (F) ✗
1797	Jonathan Trumbull Jr. (F)	John Treadwell (F)	Samuel Wyllys (F)	Andrew Kingsbury (F)		F majority	F majority	James Hillhouse (F)	Uriah Tracy (F)	7F	Adams ✓ / T. Pinckney (F) ✗
1798	Jonathan Trumbull Jr. (F)	John Treadwell (F)	Samuel Wyllys (F)	Andrew Kingsbury (F)		F majority	F majority	James Hillhouse (F)	Uriah Tracy (F)	7F	Adams ✓ / T. Pinckney (F) ✗
1799	Jonathan Trumbull Jr. (F)	John Treadwell (F)	Samuel Wyllys (F)	Andrew Kingsbury (F)		F majority	F majority	James Hillhouse (F)	Uriah Tracy (F)	7F	Adams ✓ / T. Pinckney (F) ✗
1800	Jonathan Trumbull Jr. (F)	John Treadwell (F)	Samuel Wyllys (F)	Andrew Kingsbury (F)		12F	F majority	James Hillhouse (F)	Uriah Tracy (F)	7F	Adams/ C. C. Pinckney (F) ✗
1800	Jonathan Trumbull Jr. (F)	John Treadwell (F)	Samuel Wyllys (F)	Andrew Kingsbury (F)		12F	162F, 27DR	James Hillhouse (F)	Uriah Tracy (F)	7F	Adams/ C. C. Pinckney (F) ✗
1801	Jonathan Trumbull Jr. (F)	John Treadwell (F)	Samuel Wyllys (F)	Andrew Kingsbury (F)		12F	153F, 36DR	James Hillhouse (F)	Uriah Tracy (F)	7F	Adams/ C. C. Pinckney (F) ✗
1801	Jonathan Trumbull Jr. (F)	John Treadwell (F)	Samuel Wyllys (F)	Andrew Kingsbury (F)		12F	149F, 40DR	James Hillhouse (F)	Uriah Tracy (F)	7F	Adams/ C. C. Pinckney (F) ✗
1802	Jonathan Trumbull Jr. (F)	John Treadwell (F)	Samuel Wyllys (F)	Andrew Kingsbury (F)		12F	136F, 55DR	James Hillhouse (F)	Uriah Tracy (F)	7F	Adams/ C. C. Pinckney (F) ✗
1802	Jonathan Trumbull Jr. (F)	John Treadwell (F)	Samuel Wyllys (F)	Andrew Kingsbury (F)		12F	125F, 60DR	James Hillhouse (F)	Uriah Tracy (F)	7F	Adams/ C. C. Pinckney (F) ✗
1803	Jonathan Trumbull Jr. (F)	John Treadwell (F)	Samuel Wyllys (F)	Andrew Kingsbury (F)		12F	145F, 48DR	James Hillhouse (F)	Uriah Tracy (F)	7F	Adams/ C. C. Pinckney (F) ✗
1803	Jonathan Trumbull Jr. (F)	John Treadwell (F)	Samuel Wyllys (F)	Andrew Kingsbury (F)		12F	130F, 63DR	James Hillhouse (F)	Uriah Tracy (F)	7F	Adams/ C. C. Pinckney (F) ✗
1804	Jonathan Trumbull Jr. (F)	John Treadwell (F)	Samuel Wyllys (F)	Andrew Kingsbury (F)		12F	117F, 78DR	James Hillhouse (F)	Uriah Tracy (F)	7F	C. C. Pinckney/ King (F) ✗
1804	Jonathan Trumbull Jr. (F)	John Treadwell (F)	Samuel Wyllys (F)	Andrew Kingsbury (F)		12F	132F, 63DR	James Hillhouse (F)	Uriah Tracy (F)	7F	C. C. Pinckney/ King (F) ✗
1805	Jonathan Trumbull Jr. (F)	John Treadwell (F)	Samuel Wyllys (F)	Andrew Kingsbury (F)		12F	127F, 68DR	James Hillhouse (F)	Uriah Tracy (F)	7F	C. C. Pinckney/ King (F) ✗
1805	Jonathan Trumbull Jr. (F)	John Treadwell (F)	Samuel Wyllys (F)	Andrew Kingsbury (F)		12F	134F, 61DR	James Hillhouse (F)	Uriah Tracy (F)	7F	C. C. Pinckney/ King (F) ✗
1806	Jonathan Trumbull Jr. (F)	John Treadwell (F)	Samuel Wyllys (F)	Andrew Kingsbury (F)	Elisha Colt	12F	123F, 72DR	James Hillhouse (F)	Uriah Tracy (F)	7F	C. C. Pinckney/ King (F) ✗
1806	Jonathan Trumbull Jr. (F)	John Treadwell (F)	Samuel Wyllys (F)	Andrew Kingsbury (F)	Elisha Colt	12F	136F, 61DR	James Hillhouse (F)	Uriah Tracy (F)	7F	C. C. Pinckney/ King (F) ✗
1807	Jonathan Trumbull Jr. (F)	John Treadwell (F)	Samuel Wyllys (F)	Andrew Kingsbury (F)	Elisha Colt	12F	131F, 63DR, 3 vac.	James Hillhouse (F)	Uriah Tracy (F)	7F	C. C. Pinckney/ King (F) ✗
1807	Jonathan Trumbull Jr. (F)	John Treadwell (F)	Samuel Wyllys (F)	Andrew Kingsbury (F)	Elisha Colt	12F	121F, 76DR, 1 vac.	James Hillhouse (F)	Uriah Tracy (F)	7F	C. C. Pinckney/ King (F) ✗
1808	Jonathan Trumbull Jr. (F)	John Treadwell (F)	Samuel Wyllys (F)	Andrew Kingsbury (F)	Elisha Colt	12F	136F, 61DR, 1 vac.	James Hillhouse (F)	Chauncey Goodrich (F)	7F	C. C. Pinckney/ King (F) ✗
1808	Jonathan Trumbull Jr. (F)	John Treadwell (F)	Samuel Wyllys (F)	Andrew Kingsbury (F)	Elisha Colt	12F	144F, 54DR, 1 vac.	James Hillhouse (F)	Chauncey Goodrich (F)	7F	C. C. Pinckney/ King (F) ✗
1809	Jonathan Trumbull Jr. (F)	John Treadwell (F)	Samuel Wyllys (F)	Andrew Kingsbury (F)	Elisha Colt	12F	156F, 43DR	James Hillhouse (F)	Chauncey Goodrich (F)	7F	C. C. Pinckney/ King (F) ✗
1809	John Treadwell (F)	Roger Griswold (F)	Samuel Wyllys (F)	Andrew Kingsbury (F)	Elisha Colt	12F	148F, 50DR, 1 vac.	James Hillhouse (F)	Chauncey Goodrich (F)	7F	C. C. Pinckney/ King (F) ✗
1810	John Treadwell (F)	Roger Griswold (F)	Thomas Day (F)	Andrew Kingsbury (F)	Elisha Colt	12F	143F, 56DR	Samuel W. Dana (F)	Chauncey Goodrich (F)	7F	C. C. Pinckney/ King (F) ✗
1810	John Treadwell (F)	Roger Griswold (F)	Thomas Day (F)	Andrew Kingsbury (F)	Elisha Colt	12F	134F, 65DR	Samuel W. Dana (F)	Chauncey Goodrich (F)	7F	C. C. Pinckney/ King (F) ✗
1811	Roger Griswold (F)	John Cotton Smith (F)	Thomas Day (F)	Andrew Kingsbury (F)	Elisha Colt	12F	139F, 60DR	Samuel W. Dana (F)	Chauncey Goodrich (F)	7F	C. C. Pinckney/ King (F) ✗
1812	Roger Griswold (F)	John Cotton Smith (F)	Thomas Day (F)	Andrew Kingsbury (F)	Elisha Colt	12F	147F, 52DR	Samuel W. Dana (F)	Chauncey Goodrich (F)	7F	C. C. Pinckney/ King (F) ✗
1812	John Cotton Smith (F)	vacant	Thomas Day (F)	Andrew Kingsbury (F)	Elisha Colt	12F	161F, 38DR	Samuel W. Dana (F)	Chauncey Goodrich (F)	7F	Clinton/ Ingersoll (F) ✗
1813	John Cotton Smith (F)	Chauncey Goodrich (F)	Thomas Day (F)	Andrew Kingsbury (F)	Elisha Colt	12F	163F, 37DR	Samuel W. Dana (F)	Chauncey Goodrich (F)	7F	Clinton/ Ingersoll (F) ✗
1814	John Cotton Smith (F)	Chauncey Goodrich (F)	Thomas Day (F)	Andrew Kingsbury (F)	Elisha Colt	12F	F majority	Samuel W. Dana (F)	David Daggett (F)	7F	Clinton/ Ingersoll (F) ✗
1814	John Cotton Smith (F)	Chauncey Goodrich (F)	Thomas Day (F)	Andrew Kingsbury (F)	Elisha Colt	12F	139F, 61DR	Samuel W. Dana (F)	David Daggett (F)	7F	Clinton/ Ingersoll (F) ✗
1815	John Cotton Smith (F)	Chauncey Goodrich (F)	Thomas Day (F)	Andrew Kingsbury (F)	Elisha Colt	12F	140F, 60DR	Samuel W. Dana (F)	David Daggett (F)	7F	Clinton/ Ingersoll (F) ✗
1815	John Cotton Smith (F)	Chauncey Goodrich (F)	Thomas Day (F)	Andrew Kingsbury (F)	Elisha Colt	12F	143F, 60DR	Samuel W. Dana (F)	David Daggett (F)	7F	Clinton/ Ingersoll (F) ✗
1816	John Cotton Smith (F)	Jonathan Ingersoll (TR)	Thomas Day (F)	Andrew Kingsbury (F)	Elisha Colt	12F	116F, 90TR	Samuel W. Dana (F)	David Daggett (F)	7F	King/ Howard (F) ✗
1816	John Cotton Smith (F)	Jonathan Ingersoll (TR)	Thomas Day (F)	Andrew Kingsbury (F)	Elisha Colt	12F	111F, 90TR	Samuel W. Dana (F)	David Daggett (F)	7F	King/ Howard (F) ✗
1817	Oliver Wolcott Jr. (TR)	Jonathan Ingersoll (TR)	Thomas Day (F)	Andrew Kingsbury (F)	Elisha Colt	12F	105TR, 96F	Samuel W. Dana (F)	David Daggett (F)	7F	King/ Howard (F) ✗
1817	Oliver Wolcott Jr. (TR)	Jonathan Ingersoll (TR)	Thomas Day (F)	Andrew Kingsbury (F)	Elisha Colt	12F	128TR, 73F	Samuel W. Dana (F)	David Daggett (F)	7F	King/ Howard (F) ✗
1818	Oliver Wolcott Jr. (TR)	Jonathan Ingersoll (TR)	Thomas Day (F)	Isaac Spencer (DR)	Elisha Colt	7TR, 5F	129TR, 72F	Samuel W. Dana (F)	David Daggett (F)	6F, 1DR	King/ Howard (F) ✗
1818	Oliver Wolcott Jr. (TR)	Jonathan Ingersoll (TR)	Thomas Day (F)	Isaac Spencer (DR)	Elisha Colt	7TR, 5F	115TR, 86F	Samuel W. Dana (F)	David Daggett (F)	6F, 1DR	King/ Howard (F) ✗
1819	Oliver Wolcott Jr. (TR)	Jonathan Ingersoll (TR)	Thomas Day (F)	Isaac Spencer (DR)	James Thomas	12TR	119TR, 82F (Note: With the approval of the Constitution of 1818, elections for the House became annual, with the election being held in April with the Senate for one-year terms.)	Samuel W. Dana (F)	James Lanman (DR)	5DR, 2F	King/ Howard (F) ✗
1820	Oliver Wolcott Jr. (TR)	Jonathan Ingersoll (TR)	Thomas Day (F)	Isaac Spencer (DR)	James Thomas	12TR	129TR, 73F	Samuel W. Dana (F)	James Lanman (DR)	5DR, 2F	Monroe/ Tompkins (DR) ✓
1821	Oliver Wolcott Jr. (TR)	Jonathan Ingersoll (TR)	Thomas Day (F)	Isaac Spencer (DR)	James Thomas	12TR	TR majority	Elijah Boardman (DR)	James Lanman (DR)	7DR	Monroe/ Tompkins (DR) ✓
1822	Oliver Wolcott Jr. (TR)	Jonathan Ingersoll (TR)	Thomas Day (F)	Isaac Spencer (DR)	James Thomas	12TR	TR majority	Elijah Boardman (DR)	James Lanman (DR)	7DR	Monroe/ Tompkins (DR) ✓
1823	Oliver Wolcott Jr. (TR)	David Plant (NR)	Thomas Day (F)	Isaac Spencer (DR)	James Thomas	12TR	TR majority	Elijah Boardman (DR)	James Lanman (DR)	6DR	Monroe/ Tompkins (DR) ✓
1824	Oliver Wolcott Jr. (TR)	David Plant (NR)	Thomas Day (F)	Isaac Spencer (DR)	James Thomas	12TR	NR majority	Henry W. Edwards (DR)	James Lanman (DR)	6DR	Adams/ Calhoun (DR) ✓
1825	Oliver Wolcott Jr. (TR)	David Plant (NR)	Thomas Day (F)	Isaac Spencer (DR)	James Thomas	NR majority	NR majority	Henry W. Edwards (J)	Calvin Willey (NR)	6NR	Adams/ Calhoun (DR) ✓
1826	Oliver Wolcott Jr. (TR)	David Plant (NR)	Thomas Day (F)	Isaac Spencer (DR)	James Thomas	NR majority	NR majority	Henry W. Edwards (J)	Calvin Willey (NR)	6NR	Adams/ Calhoun (DR) ✓
1827	Gideon Tomlinson (DR)	John Samuel Peters (NR)	Thomas Day (F)	Isaac Spencer (DR)	James Thomas	NR majority	NR majority	Samuel A. Foot (NR)	Calvin Willey (NR)	6NR	Adams/ Calhoun (DR) ✓
1828	Gideon Tomlinson (NR) (Note: Resigned to take an elected seat in the United States Senate.)	John Samuel Peters (NR)	Thomas Day (F)	Isaac Spencer (DR)	James Thomas	NR majority	NR majority	Samuel A. Foot (NR)	Calvin Willey (NR)	6NR	Adams/ Rush (NR) ✗
1829	Gideon Tomlinson (NR)	John Samuel Peters (NR)	Thomas Day (F)	Isaac Spencer (DR)	James Thomas	NR majority	NR majority	Samuel A. Foot (NR)	Calvin Willey (NR)	6NR	Adams/ Rush (NR) ✗
1830	Gideon Tomlinson (NR)	John Samuel Peters (NR)	Thomas Day (F)	Isaac Spencer (DR)	Elisha Phelps (NR)	NR majority	J majority	Samuel A. Foot (NR)	Calvin Willey (NR)	6NR	Adams/ Rush (NR) ✗
1831	Gideon Tomlinson (NR)	John Samuel Peters (NR)	Thomas Day (F)	Isaac Spencer (DR)	Elisha Phelps (NR)	NR majority	NR majority	Samuel A. Foot (NR)	Calvin Willey (NR)	6NR	Adams/ Rush (NR) ✗
1831	John Samuel Peters (NR)	vacant	Thomas Day (F)	Isaac Spencer (DR)	Elisha Phelps (NR)	NR majority	NR majority	Samuel A. Foot (NR)	Gideon Tomlinson (NR)	6NR	Adams/ Rush (NR) ✗
1832	John Samuel Peters (NR)	vacant	Thomas Day (F)	Isaac Spencer (DR)	Elisha Phelps (NR)	NR majority	NR majority	Samuel A. Foot (NR)	Gideon Tomlinson (NR)	6NR	Clay/ Sergeant (NR) ✗
1833	Henry W. Edwards (D)	Ebenezer Stoddard (D)	Thomas Day (F)	Isaac Spencer (DR)	Elisha Phelps (NR)	17J, 4NR	129J, 35NR, 24A-M, 14?	Nathan Smith (NR)	Gideon Tomlinson (NR)	6NR	Clay/ Sergeant (NR) ✗
1834	Samuel A. Foot (W)	Thaddeus Betts (W)	Thomas Day (F)	Isaac Spencer (DR)	Roger Huntington (W)	16NR, 5J	82NR, 80J, 30A-M, 9I (Note: The National Republicans formed a coalition with the Anti-Masons to elect Roger Huntington, and later William L. Storrs after Huntington resigned, as Speaker.)	Nathan Smith (NR)	Gideon Tomlinson (NR)	6NR	Clay/ Sergeant (NR) ✗
1835	Henry W. Edwards (D)	Ebenezer Stoddard (D)	Royal R. Hinman (W)	Jeremiah Brown (W)	Gideon Welles (D)	16D, 5W	126D, 80W	Nathan Smith (NR)	Gideon Tomlinson (NR)	6J, 1D	Clay/ Sergeant (NR) ✗
1836	Henry W. Edwards (D)	Ebenezer Stoddard (D)	Royal R. Hinman (W)	Jeremiah Brown (W)	William Field (D)	17D, 4W	130D, 71W	John Milton Niles (J)	Gideon Tomlinson (NR)	6J, 1D	Van Buren/ Johnson (D) ✓
1837	Henry W. Edwards (D)	Ebenezer Stoddard (D)	Royal R. Hinman (W)	Jeremiah Brown (W)	William Field (D)	14D, 7W	110D, 79W	John Milton Niles (D)	Perry Smith (D)	6D	Van Buren/ Johnson (D) ✓
1838	William W. Ellsworth (W)	Charles Hawley (W)	Royal R. Hinman (W)	Hiram Ryder (W)	Henry Kilbourn (W)	20W, 1D	158W, 42D, 6Cons	John Milton Niles (D)	Perry Smith (D)	6D	Van Buren/ Johnson (D) ✓
1839	William W. Ellsworth (W)	Charles Hawley (W)	Royal R. Hinman (W)	Hiram Ryder (W)	Henry Kilbourn (W)	13W, 8D	107W, 87D, 2Cons	Thaddeus Betts (W)	Perry Smith (D)	6W	Van Buren/ Johnson (D) ✓
1840	William W. Ellsworth (W)	Charles Hawley (W)	Royal R. Hinman (W)	Hiram Ryder (W)	Henry Kilbourn (W)	18W, 3D	143W, 63D, 8?	Thaddeus Betts (W)	Perry Smith (D)	6W	Harrison/ Tyler (W) ✓
1841	William W. Ellsworth (W)	Charles Hawley (W)	Royal R. Hinman (W)	Hiram Ryder (W)	Henry Kilbourn (W)	20W, 1D	116W, 57D, 41 vac.	Jabez W. Huntington (W)	Perry Smith (D)	6W	Harrison/ Tyler (W) ✓
1842	Chauncey F. Cleveland (D)	William S. Holabird (D)	Noah A. Phelps (D)	Jabez L. White Jr. (D)	Gideon Welles (D)	14D, 7W	124D, 55W	Jabez W. Huntington (W)	Perry Smith (D)	6W	Harrison/ Tyler (W) ✓
1843	Chauncey F. Cleveland (D)	William S. Holabird (D)	Noah A. Phelps (D)	Jabez L. White Jr. (D)	Gideon Welles (D)	16D, 5W	113D, 75W	Jabez W. Huntington (W)	John Milton Niles (D)	4D	Harrison/ Tyler (W) ✓
1844	Roger Sherman Baldwin (W)	Reuben Booth (W)	Daniel P. Tyler (W)	Joseph B. Gilbert (W)	Abijah Carrington (W)	16W, 5D	112W, 77D	Jabez W. Huntington (W)	John Milton Niles (D)	4D	Clay/ Frelinghuysen (W) ✗
1845	Roger Sherman Baldwin (W)	Reuben Booth (W)	Daniel P. Tyler (W)	Joseph B. Gilbert (W)	Abijah Carrington (W)	16W, 5D	112W, 77D, 1Lty	Jabez W. Huntington (W)	John Milton Niles (D)	4W	Clay/ Frelinghuysen (W) ✗
1846	Isaac Toucey (D) (Note: Lost election, but was appointed by state legislature.)	Noyes Billings (D)	Charles W. Bradley (D)	Alonzo W. Birge (D)	Mason Cleveland (D)	11D, 10W	116D, 103W, 1Lty	Jabez W. Huntington (W)	John Milton Niles (D)	4W	Clay/ Frelinghuysen (W) ✗
1847	Clark Bissell (W)	Charles J. McCurdy (W)	John Brownlee Robertson (W)	Joseph B. Gilbert (W)	Abijah Catlin (W)	13W, 8D	119W, 100D, 1I	Jabez W. Huntington (W)	John Milton Niles (D)	4W	Clay/ Frelinghuysen (W) ✗
1848	Clark Bissell (W)	Charles J. McCurdy (W)	John Brownlee Robertson (W)	Joseph B. Gilbert (W)	Abijah Catlin (W)	13W, 8D	117W, 102D, 1Lty	Roger Sherman; Baldwin (W)	John Milton Niles (D)	4W	Taylor/ Fillmore (W) ✓
1849	Joseph Trumbull (W)	Thomas Backus (W)	Roger H. Mills (W)	Henry D. Smith (D)	Abijah Catlin (W)	11D, 6W, 4FS	108W, 95D, 19FS (Note: A Free Soil Democrat, John C. Lewis, was elected in a coalition between the Democrats and Free Soilers, and the coalition organized the chamber.)	Roger Sherman; Baldwin (W)	Truman Smith (W)	2D, 1W, 1FS	Taylor/ Fillmore (W) ✓
1850	Thomas H. Seymour (D) (Note: Resigned to become ambassador to Russia.)	Charles H. Pond (D)	Hiram Weed (D)	Henry D. Smith (D)	Rufus G. Pinney (D)	12D, 6W, 3FS	111D, 97W, 14FS (Note: After several rounds of balloting, a rule change was passed that allowed the highest voter-getter to be elected, and Origen S. Seymour, a Democrat, was elected, and the Democrats organized the chamber.)	Roger Sherman; Baldwin (W)	Truman Smith (W)	2D, 1W, 1FS	Taylor/ Fillmore (W) ✓
1850	Thomas H. Seymour (D)	Charles H. Pond (D)	John P. C. Mather (D)	Henry D. Smith (D)	Rufus G. Pinney (D)	12D, 6W, 3FS	111D, 97W, 14FS	Roger Sherman; Baldwin (W)	Truman Smith (W)	2D, 1W, 1FS	Taylor/ Fillmore (W) ✓
1851	Thomas H. Seymour (D)	Green Kendrick (W)	John P. C. Mather (D)	Thomas Clark (W)	Rufus G. Pinney (D)	12W, 8D, 1FS	110D, 107W, 5FS, 2I (Note: The Free Soilers joined with the Democrats to elect Samuel Ingham, a Democrat, as Speaker and to organize the chamber.)	Isaac Toucey (D)	Truman Smith (W)	3D, 1W	Taylor/ Fillmore (W) ✓
1852	Thomas H. Seymour (D)	Charles H. Pond (D)	John P. C. Mather (D)	Edwin Stearns (D)	Rufus G. Pinney (D)	14D, 6W, 1FS	130D, 85W, 7FS, 3I	Isaac Toucey (D)	Truman Smith (W)	3D, 1W	Pierce/ King (D) ✓
1853	Thomas H. Seymour (D)	Charles H. Pond (D)	John P. C. Mather (D)	Edwin Stearns (D)	Rufus G. Pinney (D)	15D, 6W	144D, 77W, 4FS, 2 vac.	Isaac Toucey (D)	Francis Gillette (FS)	4D	Pierce/ King (D) ✓
1853	Charles H. Pond (D) (Note: As lieutenant governor, filled unexpired term.)	vacant	John P. C. Mather (D)	Edwin Stearns (D)	Rufus G. Pinney (D)	15D, 6W	144D, 77W, 4FS, 2 vac.	Isaac Toucey (D)	Francis Gillette (FS)	4D	Pierce/ King (D) ✓
1854	Henry Dutton (W)	Alexander H. Holley (W)	Oliver H. Perry (W)	Daniel Camp (W)	John Dunham (W)	16W, 5D	119W, 89D, 10FS, 1I	Isaac Toucey (D)	Francis Gillette (FS)	4D	Pierce/ King (D) ✓
1855	William T. Minor (KN)	William Field (FS)	Nehemiah D. Sperry (KN)	Arthur B. Calef (KN)	Alexander Merrell (KN)	16KN, 4D, 1W	163KN, 65D (Note: The Know-Nothings came together with Whigs and Free Soilers to form a coalition which ran the House and elected a Know-Nothing Speaker, Austin Baldwin. For statistical purposes, the Whigs and Free Soilers were subsumed under the American Party banner for this session.)	Isaac Toucey (D)	Lafayette S. Foster (O)	4KN	Pierce/ King (D) ✓
1856	William T. Minor (KN)	Albert Day (KN)	Nehemiah D. Sperry (KN)	Frederick P. Coe (KN)	Edward Prentis (KN)	13O, 8D	127O, 105D	Isaac Toucey (D)	Lafayette S. Foster (O)	4KN	Frémont/ Dayton (R) ✗
1857	Alexander H. Holley (R)	Alfred A. Burnham (R)	Orville H. Platt (R)	Frederick S. Wildman (R)	Joseph G. Lamb (KN)	15R, 6D	139R, 93D	James Dixon (R)	Lafayette S. Foster (O)	2D, 2R	Frémont/ Dayton (R) ✗
1858	William A. Buckingham (R)	Julius Catlin (R)	John Boyd (R)	Lucius J. Hendee (KN)	William H. Buell (R)	15R, 6D	146R, 88D	James Dixon (R)	Lafayette S. Foster (O)	2D, 2R	Frémont/ Dayton (R) ✗
1859	William A. Buckingham (R)	Julius Catlin (R)	John Boyd (R)	Lucius J. Hendee (KN)	William H. Buell (R)	13R, 8D	125R, 109D	James Dixon (R)	Lafayette S. Foster (O)	4R	Frémont/ Dayton (R) ✗
1860	William A. Buckingham (R)	Julius Catlin (R)	John Boyd (R)	Lucius J. Hendee (KN)	William H. Buell (R)	14R, 7D	147R, 88D	James Dixon (R)	Lafayette S. Foster (O)	4R	Lincoln/ Hamlin (R) ✓
1861	William A. Buckingham (R)	Benjamin Douglas (R)	James Hammond; Trumbull (R)	Ezra Dean (R)	Leman W. Cutler (R)	13R, 8D	149R, 86D	James Dixon (R)	Lafayette S. Foster (R)	2D, 2R	Lincoln/ Hamlin (R) ✓
1862	William A. Buckingham (R)	Roger Averill (U)	James Hammond; Trumbull (R)	Gabriel W. Coit (U)	Leman W. Cutler (R)	21R	187R, 57D	James Dixon (R)	Lafayette S. Foster (R)	2D, 2R	Lincoln/ Hamlin (R) ✓
1863	William A. Buckingham (R)	Roger Averill (U)	James Hammond; Trumbull (R)	Gabriel W. Coit (U)	Leman W. Cutler (R)	14R, 7D	139R, 96D, 1I, 1?	James Dixon (R)	Lafayette S. Foster (R)	3R, 1D	Lincoln/ Hamlin (R) ✓
1864	William A. Buckingham (NU)	Roger Averill (NU)	James Hammond; Trumbull (R)	Gabriel W. Coit (NU)	Leman W. Cutler (R)	18R, 3D	155R, 79D	James Dixon (R)	Lafayette S. Foster (R)	3R, 1D	Lincoln/ Johnson (NU) ✓
1865	William A. Buckingham (NU)	Roger Averill (NU)	James Hammond; Trumbull (R)	Gabriel W. Coit (NU)	Leman W. Cutler (R)	21R	158R, 77D	James Dixon (R)	Lafayette S. Foster (R)	4R	Lincoln/ Johnson (NU) ✓
1866	Joseph R. Hawley (R)	Oliver Winchester (R)	Leverett E. Pease (NU)	Henry G. Taintor (R)	Robbins Battell (R)	13R, 8D	141R, 94D	James Dixon (R)	Lafayette S. Foster (R)	4R	Lincoln/ Johnson (NU) ✓
1867	James E. English (D)	Ephraim H. Hyde (D)	Leverett E. Pease (NU)	Edward S. Moseley (D)	Jesse Olney (D)	11R, 10D	127R, 111D	James Dixon (R)	Orris S. Ferry (R)	2D, 2R	Lincoln/ Johnson (NU) ✓
1868	James E. English (D)	Ephraim H. Hyde (D)	Leverett E. Pease (NU)	Edward S. Moseley (D)	Jesse Olney (D)	12R, 9D	129R, 109D	James Dixon (R)	Orris S. Ferry (R)	2D, 2R	Grant/ Colfax (R) ✓
1869	Marshall Jewell (R)	Francis Wayland (R)	Hiram Appleman (R)	David P. Nichols (R)	James W. Manning (R)	14R, 7D	132R, 106D	William A. Buckingham (R)	Orris S. Ferry (R)	3R, 1D	Grant/ Colfax (R) ✓
1870	James E. English (D)	Julius Hotchkiss (D)	Thomas M. Waller (D)	Charles M. Pond (D)	Seth S. Logan (D)	11R, 10D	127R, 109D, 3I	William A. Buckingham (R)	Orris S. Ferry (R)	3R, 1D	Grant/ Colfax (R) ✓
1871	Marshall Jewell (R)	Morris Tyler (R)	Hiram Appleman (R)	David P. Nichols (R)	James W. Manning (R)	13R, 8D	129R, 110D	William A. Buckingham (R)	Orris S. Ferry (R)	3R, 1D	Grant/ Colfax (R) ✓
1872	Marshall Jewell (R)	Morris Tyler (R)	Hiram Appleman (R)	David P. Nichols (R)	James W. Manning (R)	15R, 6D	130R, 111D	William A. Buckingham (R)	Orris S. Ferry (R)	3R, 1D	Grant/ Wilson (R) ✓
1873	Charles Roberts Ingersoll (D)	George G. Sill (D)	D. W. Edgecomb (R)	William E. Raymond (D)	Alfred R. Goodrich (D)	14R, 7D	132D, 108R, 1I	William A. Buckingham (R)	Orris S. Ferry (LR)	3R, 1D	Grant/ Wilson (R) ✓
1873	Charles Roberts Ingersoll (D)	George G. Sill (D)	Marvin H. Sanger (D)	William E. Raymond (D)	Alfred R. Goodrich (D)	14R, 7D	132D, 108R, 1I	William A. Buckingham (R)	Orris S. Ferry (LR)	3R, 1D	Grant/ Wilson (R) ✓
1874	Charles Roberts Ingersoll (D)	George G. Sill (D)	Marvin H. Sanger (D)	William E. Raymond (D)	Alfred R. Goodrich (D)	17D, 4R	143R, 99D	William A. Buckingham (R)	Orris S. Ferry (R)	3R, 1D	Grant/ Wilson (R) ✓
1875	Charles Roberts Ingersoll (D)	George G. Sill (D)	Marvin H. Sanger (D)	William E. Raymond (D)	Alfred R. Goodrich (D)	15D, 6R	137D, 107R, 1I	William W. Eaton (D)	James E. English (D)	3D, 1R	Grant/ Wilson (R) ✓
1876	Charles Roberts Ingersoll (D)	George G. Sill (D)	Marvin H. Sanger (D)	William E. Raymond (D)	Alfred R. Goodrich (D)	18D, 3R	161D, 85R	William W. Eaton (D)	James E. English (D)	3D, 1R	Tilden/ Hendricks (D) ✗
1877	Richard D. Hubbard (D)	Francis Loomis (D)	Dwight Morris (D)	Edwin A. Buck (D)	Charles C. Hubbard (D)	11R, 10D	141R, 105D	William W. Eaton (D)	William Barnum (D)	3D, 1R	Tilden/ Hendricks (D) ✗
1878	Richard D. Hubbard (D)	Francis Loomis (D)	Dwight Morris (D)	Edwin A. Buck (D)	Charles C. Hubbard (D)	13R, 8D	137R, 109D	William W. Eaton (D)	William Barnum (D)	3D, 1R	Tilden/ Hendricks (D) ✗
1879	Charles B. Andrews (R)	David Gallup (R)	David Torrance (R)	Talmadge Baker (R)	Chauncey Howard (R)	14R, 7D	143R, 99D, 1GB, 1I, 2 vac.	William W. Eaton (D)	Orville H. Platt (R)	3R, 1D	Tilden/ Hendricks (D) ✗
1880	Charles B. Andrews (R)	David Gallup (R)	David Torrance (R)	Talmadge Baker (R)	Chauncey Howard (R)	16R, 5D	162R, 83D, 1GB	William W. Eaton (D)	Orville H. Platt (R)	3R, 1D	Garfield/ Arthur (R) ✓
1881	Hobart B. Bigelow (R)	William H. Bulkeley (R)	Charles E. Searls (R)	David P. Nichols (R)	Wheelock Batcheller (R)	16R, 5D	166R, 80D, 1GB, 1I	Joseph R. Hawley (R)	Orville H. Platt (R)	3R, 1D	Garfield/ Arthur (R) ✓
1882	Hobart B. Bigelow (R)	William H. Bulkeley (R)	Charles E. Searls (R)	James D. Smith (R)	Wheelock Batcheller (R)	17R, 7D	160R, 89D	Joseph R. Hawley (R)	Orville H. Platt (R)	3R, 1D	Garfield/ Arthur (R) ✓
1883	Thomas M. Waller (D)	George G. Summer (D)	D. Ward Northrop (D)	Alfred R. Goodrich (D)	Frank D. Sloat (R)	13R, 11D	139R, 110D	Joseph R. Hawley (R)	Orville H. Platt (R)	3D, 1R	Garfield/ Arthur (R) ✓
1884	Thomas M. Waller (D)	George G. Summer (D)	D. Ward Northrop (D)	Alfred R. Goodrich (D)	Frank D. Sloat (R)	15R, 9D	153R, 96D	Joseph R. Hawley (R)	Orville H. Platt (R)	3D, 1R	Cleveland/ Hendricks (D) ✓
1885	Henry Baldwin Harrison (R)	Lorrin A. Cooke (R)	Charles Addison Russell (R)	V. B. Chamberlain (R)	Luzerne I. Munson (R)	17R, 7D	148R, 100D, 1GB	Joseph R. Hawley (R)	Orville H. Platt (R)	2D, 2R	Cleveland/ Hendricks (D) ✓
1886	Henry Baldwin Harrison (R)	Lorrin A. Cooke (R)	Charles Addison Russell (R)	V. B. Chamberlain (R)	Luzerne I. Munson (R)	13R, 11D	131R, 116D, 2I	Joseph R. Hawley (R)	Orville H. Platt (R)	2D, 2R	Cleveland/ Hendricks (D) ✓
1887	Phineas C. Lounsbury (R)	James L. Howard (R)	Leverett M. Hubbard (R)	Alexander Warner (R)	Thomas Clark (R)	14R, 10D	137R, 109D, 2I, 1vac.	Joseph R. Hawley (R)	Orville H. Platt (R)	3D, 1R	Cleveland/ Hendricks (D) ✓
1888	Phineas C. Lounsbury (R)	James L. Howard (R)	Leverett M. Hubbard (R)	Alexander Warner (R)	Thomas Clark (R)	14R, 10D	137R, 109D, 2I, 1vac.	Joseph R. Hawley (R)	Orville H. Platt (R)	3D, 1R	Cleveland/ Thurman (D) ✗
1889	Morgan Bulkeley (Note: Bulkeley was technically unelected from 1890 on. He did not run for re-election in 1890, but due to such a close contest and controversies, the results were not certified, and the legislature spent two years debating the issue; Bulkeley essentially served as governor by default.)	Samuel E. Merwin (R)	R. Jay Walsh (R)	E. Stevens Henry (R)	John B. Wright (R)	17R, 7D	152R, 96D, 1I	Joseph R. Hawley (R)	Orville H. Platt (R)	3R, 1D	Cleveland/ Thurman (D) ✗
1890	Morgan Bulkeley	Samuel E. Merwin (R)	R. Jay Walsh (R)	E. Stevens Henry (R)	John B. Wright (R)	17R, 7D	152R, 96D, 1I	Joseph R. Hawley (R)	Orville H. Platt (R)	3R, 1D	Cleveland/ Thurman (D) ✗
1891	Morgan Bulkeley	Samuel E. Merwin (R)	R. Jay Walsh (R)	E. Stevens Henry (R)	Nicholas Staub (D)	17D, 7R	133R, 116D, 1I, 1vac.	Joseph R. Hawley (R)	Orville H. Platt (R)	3D, 1R	Cleveland/ Thurman (D) ✗
1892	Morgan Bulkeley	Samuel E. Merwin (R)	R. Jay Walsh (R)	E. Stevens Henry (R)	Nicholas Staub (D)	17D, 7R	133R, 116D, 1I, 1vac.	Joseph R. Hawley (R)	Orville H. Platt (R)	3D, 1R	Cleveland/ Stevenson (D) ✓
1893	Luzon B. Morris (D)	Ernest Cady (D)	John J. Phelan (D)	Marvin H. Sanger (D)	Nicholas Staub (D)	12R, 12D (Note: Due to the tie-breaking vote of the Lt. Governor, the Democrats elected Frederick W. Holden as President Pro Tempore and organized the chamber.)	137R, 113D, 1Proh	Joseph R. Hawley (R)	Orville H. Platt (R)	3D, 1R	Cleveland/ Stevenson (D) ✓
1894	Luzon B. Morris (D)	Ernest Cady (D)	John J. Phelan (D)	Marvin H. Sanger (D)	Nicholas Staub (D)	12R, 12D	137R, 113D, 1Proh	Joseph R. Hawley (R)	Orville H. Platt (R)	3D, 1R	Cleveland/ Stevenson (D) ✓
1895	Owen Vincent Coffin (R)	Lorrin A. Cooke (R)	William C. Mowry (R)	George W. Hodge (R)	Benjamin P. Mead (R)	23R, 1D	204R, 46D, 1Pop	Joseph R. Hawley (R)	Orville H. Platt (R)	4R	Cleveland/ Stevenson (D) ✓
1896	Owen Vincent Coffin (R)	Lorrin A. Cooke (R)	William C. Mowry (R)	George W. Hodge (R)	Benjamin P. Mead (R)	23R, 1D	204R, 46D, 1Pop	Joseph R. Hawley (R)	Orville H. Platt (R)	4R	McKinley/ Hobart (R) ✓
1897	Lorrin A. Cooke (R)	James D. Dewell (R)	Charles Phelps (R)	Charles W. Grosvenor (R)	Benjamin P. Mead (R)	24R	218R, 29D, 5NatD	Joseph R. Hawley (R)	Orville H. Platt (R)	4R	McKinley/ Hobart (R) ✓
1898	Lorrin A. Cooke (R)	James D. Dewell (R)	Charles Phelps (R)	Charles W. Grosvenor (R)	Benjamin P. Mead (R)	24R	218R, 29D, 5NatD	Joseph R. Hawley (R)	Orville H. Platt (R)	4R	McKinley/ Hobart (R) ✓

== 1899–present ==
Year	Executive offices						General Assembly		United States Congress			Electoral votes
Year	Governor	Lt. Governor	Secretary of State	Attorney General	Treasurer	Comptroller	State Senate	State House	U.S. Senator (Class I)	U.S. Senator (Class III)	U.S. House	Electoral votes
1899	George E. Lounsbury (R)	Lyman A. Mills (R)	Huber Clark (R)	Charles Phelps (R)	Charles S. Mersick (R)	Thompson S. Grant (R)	20R, 4D	180R, 69D, 3NatD	Joseph R. Hawley (R)	Orville H. Platt (R)	4R	
1900	George E. Lounsbury (R)	Lyman A. Mills (R)	Huber Clark (R)	Charles Phelps (R)	Charles S. Mersick (R)	Thompson S. Grant (R)	20R, 4D	180R, 69D, 3NatD	Joseph R. Hawley (R)	Orville H. Platt (R)	4R	McKinley/ Roosevelt (R) ✓
1901	George P. McLean (R)	Edwin O. Keeler (R)	Charles G. R. Vinal (R)	Charles Phelps (R)	Henry H. Gallup (R)	Abiram Chamberlain (R)	22R, 2D	201R, 52D, 1NatD, 1I	Joseph R. Hawley (R)	Orville H. Platt (R)	4R	McKinley/ Roosevelt (R) ✓
1902	George P. McLean (R)	Edwin O. Keeler (R)	Charles G. R. Vinal (R)	Charles Phelps (R)	Henry H. Gallup (R)	Abiram Chamberlain (R)	22R, 2D	201R, 52D, 1NatD, 1I	Joseph R. Hawley (R)	Orville H. Platt (R)	4R	McKinley/ Roosevelt (R) ✓
1903	Abiram Chamberlain (R)	Henry Roberts (R)	Charles G. R. Vinal (R)	William A. King (R)	Henry H. Gallup (R)	William E. Seeley (R)	18R, 6D	187R, 68D	Joseph R. Hawley (R)	Orville H. Platt (R)	5R	McKinley/ Roosevelt (R) ✓
1904	Abiram Chamberlain (R)	Henry Roberts (R)	Charles G. R. Vinal (R)	William A. King (R)	Henry H. Gallup (R)	William E. Seeley (R)	18R, 6D	187R, 68D	Joseph R. Hawley (R)	Orville H. Platt (R)	5R	Roosevelt/ Fairbanks (R) ✓
1905	Henry Roberts (R)	Rollin S. Woodruff (R)	Theodore Bodenwein (R)	William A. King (R)	James F. Walsh (R)	Asahel W. Mitchell (R)	29R, 6D	219R, 36D	Morgan Bulkeley (R)	Frank B. Brandegee (R)	5R	Roosevelt/ Fairbanks (R) ✓
1906	Henry Roberts (R)	Rollin S. Woodruff (R)	Theodore Bodenwein (R)	William A. King (R)	James F. Walsh (R)	Asahel W. Mitchell (R)	29R, 6D	219R, 36D	Morgan Bulkeley (R)	Frank B. Brandegee (R)	5R	Roosevelt/ Fairbanks (R) ✓
1907	Rollin S. Woodruff (R)	Everett J. Lake (R)	Theodore Bodenwein (R)	Marcus H. Holcomb (R)	Freeman F. Patten (R)	Thomas D. Bradstreet (R)	27R, 8D	189R, 66D	Morgan Bulkeley (R)	Frank B. Brandegee (R)	5R	Roosevelt/ Fairbanks (R) ✓
1908	Rollin S. Woodruff (R)	Everett J. Lake (R)	Theodore Bodenwein (R)	Marcus H. Holcomb (R)	Freeman F. Patten (R)	Thomas D. Bradstreet (R)	27R, 8D	189R, 66D	Morgan Bulkeley (R)	Frank B. Brandegee (R)	5R	Taft/ Sherman (R) ✓
1909	George L. Lilley (R)	Frank B. Weeks (R)	Matthew H. Rogers (R)	Marcus H. Holcomb (R)	Freeman F. Patten (R)	Thomas D. Bradstreet (R)	31R, 4D	208R, 47D	Morgan Bulkeley (R)	Frank B. Brandegee (R)	5R	Taft/ Sherman (R) ✓
1909	Frank B. Weeks (R)	vacant	Matthew H. Rogers (R)	Marcus H. Holcomb (R)	Freeman F. Patten (R)	Thomas D. Bradstreet (R)	31R, 4D	208R, 47D	Morgan Bulkeley (R)	Frank B. Brandegee (R)	5R	Taft/ Sherman (R) ✓
1910	Frank B. Weeks (R)	vacant	Matthew H. Rogers (R)	John H. Light (R)	Freeman F. Patten (R)	Thomas D. Bradstreet (R)	31R, 4D	208R, 47D	Morgan Bulkeley (R)	Frank B. Brandegee (R)	5R	Taft/ Sherman (R) ✓
1911	Simeon E. Baldwin (D)	Dennis A. Blakeslee (R)	Matthew H. Rogers (R)	John H. Light (R)	Costello Lippitt (R)	Thomas D. Bradstreet (R)	21R, 14D	160R, 98D	George P. McLean (R)	Frank B. Brandegee (R)	4R, 1D	Taft/ Sherman (R) ✓
1912	Simeon E. Baldwin (D)	Dennis A. Blakeslee (R)	Matthew H. Rogers (R)	John H. Light (R)	Costello Lippitt (R)	Thomas D. Bradstreet (R)	21R, 14D	160R, 98D	George P. McLean (R)	Frank B. Brandegee (R)	4R, 1D	Wilson/ Marshall (D) ✓
1913	Simeon E. Baldwin (D)	Lyman T. Tingier (D)	Albert Phillips (D)	John H. Light (R)	Edward S. Roberts (D)	Daniel P. Dunn (D)	21D, 14R	130R, 120D, 6Prog, 2ProgR	George P. McLean (R)	Frank B. Brandegee (R)	5D	Wilson/ Marshall (D) ✓
1914	Simeon E. Baldwin (D)	Lyman T. Tingier (D)	Albert Phillips (D)	John H. Light (R)	Edward S. Roberts (D)	Daniel P. Dunn (D)	21D, 14R	130R, 120D, 6Prog, 2ProgR	George P. McLean (R)	Frank B. Brandegee (R)	5D	Wilson/ Marshall (D) ✓
1915	Marcus H. Holcomb (R)	Clifford B. Wilson (R)	Charles D. Burnes (R)	George E. Hinman (R)	F. S. Chamberlain (R)	Morris C. Webster (R)	30R, 5D	196R, 60D, 1Prog, 1I	George P. McLean (R)	Frank B. Brandegee (R)	5R	Wilson/ Marshall (D) ✓
1916	Marcus H. Holcomb (R)	Clifford B. Wilson (R)	Charles D. Burnes (R)	George E. Hinman (R)	F. S. Chamberlain (R)	Morris C. Webster (R)	30R, 5D	196R, 60D, 1Prog, 1I	George P. McLean (R)	Frank B. Brandegee (R)	5R	Hughes/ Fairbanks (R) ✗
1917	Marcus H. Holcomb (R)	Clifford B. Wilson (R)	Frederick L. Perry (R)	George E. Hinman (R)	F. S. Chamberlain (R)	Morris C. Webster (R)	25R, 10D	194R, 64D	George P. McLean (R)	Frank B. Brandegee (R)	4R, 1D	Hughes/ Fairbanks (R) ✗
1918	Marcus H. Holcomb (R)	Clifford B. Wilson (R)	Frederick L. Perry (R)	George E. Hinman (R)	F. S. Chamberlain (R)	Morris C. Webster (R)	25R, 10D	194R, 64D	George P. McLean (R)	Frank B. Brandegee (R)	4R, 1D	Hughes/ Fairbanks (R) ✗
1919	Marcus H. Holcomb (R)	Clifford B. Wilson (R)	Frederick L. Perry (R)	Frank E. Healy (R)	G. Harold Gilpatric (R)	Morris C. Webster (R)	24R, 11D	189R, 69D	George P. McLean (R)	Frank B. Brandegee (R)	4R, 1D	Hughes/ Fairbanks (R) ✗
1920	Marcus H. Holcomb (R)	Clifford B. Wilson (R)	Frederick L. Perry (R)	Frank E. Healy (R)	G. Harold Gilpatric (R)	Morris C. Webster (R)	24R, 11D	189R, 69D	George P. McLean (R)	Frank B. Brandegee (R)	4R, 1D	Harding/ Coolidge (R) ✓
1921	Everett J. Lake (R)	Charles A. Templeton (R)	Donald J. Warner (R)	Frank E. Healy (R)	G. Harold Gilpatric (R)	Harvey P. Bissell (R)	34R, 1D	248R, 13D, 1I	George P. McLean (R)	Frank B. Brandegee (R)	5R	Harding/ Coolidge (R) ✓
1922	Everett J. Lake (R)	Charles A. Templeton (R)	Donald J. Warner (R)	Frank E. Healy (R)	G. Harold Gilpatric (R)	Harvey P. Bissell (R)	34R, 1D	248R, 13D, 1I	George P. McLean (R)	Frank B. Brandegee (R)	5R	Harding/ Coolidge (R) ✓
1923	Charles A. Templeton (R)	Hiram Bingham III (R)	Francis A. Pallotti (R)	Frank E. Healy (R)	G. Harold Gilpatric (R)	Frederick M. Salmon (R)	27R, 8D	210R, 52D	George P. McLean (R)	Frank B. Brandegee (R)	4R, 1D	Harding/ Coolidge (R) ✓
1924	Charles A. Templeton (R)	Hiram Bingham III (R)	Francis A. Pallotti (R)	Frank E. Healy (R)	Anson T. McCook (R)	Frederick M. Salmon (R)	27R, 8D	210R, 52D	George P. McLean (R)	Frank B. Brandegee (R)	4R, 1D	Coolidge/ Dawes (R) ✓
1925	Hiram Bingham III (R)	John H. Trumbull (R)	Francis A. Pallotti (R)	Frank E. Healy (R)	Ernest E. Rogers (R)	Frederick M. Salmon (R)	33R, 2D	239R, 23D	George P. McLean (R)	Frank B. Brandegee (R)	5R	Coolidge/ Dawes (R) ✓
1925	John H. Trumbull (R)	J. Edwin Brainard (R)	Francis A. Pallotti (R)	Frank E. Healy (R)	Ernest E. Rogers (R)	Frederick M. Salmon (R)	33R, 2D	239R, 23D	George P. McLean (R)	Hiram Bingham III (R)	5R	Coolidge/ Dawes (R) ✓
1926	John H. Trumbull (R)	J. Edwin Brainard (R)	Francis A. Pallotti (R)	Frank E. Healy (R)	Ernest E. Rogers (R)	Frederick M. Salmon (R)	33R, 2D	239R, 23D	George P. McLean (R)	Hiram Bingham III (R)	5R	Coolidge/ Dawes (R) ✓
1927	John H. Trumbull (R)	J. Edwin Brainard (R)	Francis A. Pallotti (R)	Benjamin W. Alling (R)	Ernest E. Rogers (R)	Frederick M. Salmon (R)	34R, 1D	238R, 24D	George P. McLean (R)	Hiram Bingham III (R)	5R	Coolidge/ Dawes (R) ✓
1928	John H. Trumbull (R)	J. Edwin Brainard (R)	Francis A. Pallotti (R)	Benjamin W. Alling (R)	Ernest E. Rogers (R)	Frederick M. Salmon (R)	34R, 1D	238R, 24D	George P. McLean (R)	Hiram Bingham III (R)	5R	Hoover/ Curtis (R) ✓
1929	John H. Trumbull (R)	Ernest E. Rogers (R)	William L. Higgins (R)	Benjamin W. Alling (R)	Samuel R. Spencer (R)	Frederick M. Salmon (R)	22R, 13D	220R, 42D	Frederic C. Walcott (R)	Hiram Bingham III (R)	5R	Hoover/ Curtis (R) ✓
1930	John H. Trumbull (R)	Ernest E. Rogers (R)	William L. Higgins (R)	Benjamin W. Alling (R)	Samuel R. Spencer (R)	Frederick M. Salmon (R)	22R, 13D	220R, 42D	Frederic C. Walcott (R)	Hiram Bingham III (R)	5R	Hoover/ Curtis (R) ✓
1931	Wilbur Lucius Cross (D)	Samuel R. Spencer (R)	William L. Higgins (R)	Warren Booth Burrows (R)	Roy C. Wilcox (R)	Frederick M. Salmon (R)	20R, 15D	182R, 85D	Frederic C. Walcott (R)	Hiram Bingham III (R)	3R, 2D	Hoover/ Curtis (R) ✓
1932	Wilbur Lucius Cross (D)	Samuel R. Spencer (R)	William L. Higgins (R)	Warren Booth Burrows (R)	Roy C. Wilcox (R)	Frederick M. Salmon (R)	20R, 15D	182R, 85D	Frederic C. Walcott (R)	Hiram Bingham III (R)	3R, 2D	Hoover/ Curtis (R) ✗
1933	Wilbur Lucius Cross (D)	Roy C. Wilcox (R)	John A. Danaher (R)	Warren Booth Burrows (R)	J. William Hope (R)	Anson F. Keeler (R)	18D, 17R	195R, 72D	Frederic C. Walcott (R)	Augustine Lonergan (D)	4R, 2D	Hoover/ Curtis (R) ✗
1934	Wilbur Lucius Cross (D)	Roy C. Wilcox (R)	John A. Danaher (R)	Warren Booth Burrows (R)	J. William Hope (R)	Anson F. Keeler (R)	18D, 17R	195R, 72D	Frederic C. Walcott (R)	Augustine Lonergan (D)	4R, 2D	Hoover/ Curtis (R) ✗
1935	Wilbur Lucius Cross (D)	T. Frank Hayes (D)	C. John Satti (D)	Edward J. Daly (D)	John S. Addis (D)	Charles C. Swartz (D)	17D, 15R, 3Soc (Note: A Republican, John F. Lynch, was elected as President Pro Tempore.)	180R, 85D, 2Soc	Francis T. Maloney (D)	Augustine Lonergan (D)	4D, 2R	Hoover/ Curtis (R) ✗
1936	Wilbur Lucius Cross (D)	T. Frank Hayes (D)	C. John Satti (D)	Edward J. Daly (D)	John S. Addis (D)	Charles C. Swartz (D)	17D, 15R, 3Soc	180R, 85D, 2Soc	Francis T. Maloney (D)	Augustine Lonergan (D)	4D, 2R	Roosevelt/ Garner (D) ✓
1937	Wilbur Lucius Cross (D)	T. Frank Hayes (D)	C. John Satti (D)	Charles J. McLaughlin (D)	Thomas Hewes (D)	Charles C. Swartz (D)	26D, 9R	167R, 100D	Francis T. Maloney (D)	Augustine Lonergan (D)	6D	Roosevelt/ Garner (D) ✓
1938	Wilbur Lucius Cross (D)	T. Frank Hayes (D)	C. John Satti (D)	Dennis P. O'Connor (D)	Guy B. Holt (D)	Charles C. Swartz (D)	26D, 9R	167R, 100D	Francis T. Maloney (D)	Augustine Lonergan (D)	6D	Roosevelt/ Garner (D) ✓
1939	Raymond E. Baldwin (R)	James L. McConaughy (R)	Sara Crawford (R)	Francis A. Pallotti (R)	Joseph E. Talbot (R)	Fred R. Zeller (R)	17D, 16R, 2Soc (Note: A Republican, Charles J. Arrigoni, was elected as President Pro Tempore.)	202R, 63D, 2Soc	Francis T. Maloney (D)	John A. Danaher (R)	4R, 2D	Roosevelt/ Garner (D) ✓
1940	Raymond E. Baldwin (R)	James L. McConaughy (R)	Sara Crawford (R)	Francis A. Pallotti (R)	Joseph E. Talbot (R)	Fred R. Zeller (R)	17D, 16R, 2Soc	202R, 63D, 2Soc	Francis T. Maloney (D)	John A. Danaher (R)	4R, 2D	Roosevelt/ Wallace (D) ✓
1941	Robert A. Hurley (D)	Odell Shepard (D)	Chase G. Woodhouse (D)	Francis A. Pallotti (R)	Frank M. Anastasio (D)	John M. Dowe (D)	21D, 14R	185R, 87D	Francis T. Maloney (D)	John A. Danaher (R)	6D	Roosevelt/ Wallace (D) ✓
1942	Robert A. Hurley (D)	Odell Shepard (D)	Chase G. Woodhouse (D)	Francis A. Pallotti (R)	Frank M. Anastasio (D)	John M. Dowe (D)	21D, 14R	185R, 87D	Francis T. Maloney (D)	John A. Danaher (R)	5D, 1R	Roosevelt/ Wallace (D) ✓
1943	Raymond E. Baldwin (R)	William L. Hadden (R)	Frances Burke Redick (R)	Francis A. Pallotti (R)	Carl M. Sharpe (R)	Fred R. Zeller (R)	21R, 15D	202R, 70D	Francis T. Maloney (D)	John A. Danaher (R)	6R	Roosevelt/ Wallace (D) ✓
1944	Raymond E. Baldwin (R)	William L. Hadden (R)	Frances Burke Redick (R)	Francis A. Pallotti (R)	Carl M. Sharpe (R)	Fred R. Zeller (R)	21R, 15D	202R, 70D	Francis T. Maloney (D)	John A. Danaher (R)	6R	Roosevelt/ Truman (D) ✓
1945	Raymond E. Baldwin (R)	Charles Wilbert Snow (D)	Charles J. Prestia (D)	William L. Hadden (R)	William T. Carroll (D)	John M. Dowe (D)	21D, 15R	196R, 76D	Thomas C. Hart (R)	Brien McMahon (D)	4D, 2R	Roosevelt/ Truman (D) ✓
1946	Raymond E. Baldwin (R)	Charles Wilbert Snow (D)	Charles J. Prestia (D)	William L. Hadden (R)	William T. Carroll (D)	John M. Dowe (D)	21D, 15R	196R, 76D	Thomas C. Hart (R)	Brien McMahon (D)	4D, 2R	Roosevelt/ Truman (D) ✓
1946	Raymond E. Baldwin (R)	Charles Wilbert Snow (D)	Charles J. Prestia (D)	William L. Hadden (R)	William T. Carroll (D)	Raymond S. Thatcher (D)	21D, 15R	196R, 76D	Thomas C. Hart (R)	Brien McMahon (D)	4D, 2R	Roosevelt/ Truman (D) ✓
1947	James L. McConaughy (R)	James C. Shannon (R)	Frances Burke Redick (R)	William L. Hadden (R)	Joseph A. Adorno (R)	Fred R. Zeller (R)	28R, 8D	227R, 45D	Raymond E. Baldwin (R)	Brien McMahon (D)	6R	Roosevelt/ Truman (D) ✓
1948	James L. McConaughy (R)	James C. Shannon (R)	Frances Burke Redick (R)	William L. Hadden (R)	Joseph A. Adorno (R)	Fred R. Zeller (R)	28R, 8D	227R, 45D	Raymond E. Baldwin (R)	Brien McMahon (D)	6R	Roosevelt/ Truman (D) ✓
1948	James C. Shannon (R)	Robert E. Parsons (R)	Frances Burke Redick (R)	William L. Hadden (R)	Joseph A. Adorno (R)	Fred R. Zeller (R)	28R, 8D	227R, 45D	Raymond E. Baldwin (R)	Brien McMahon (D)	6R	Dewey/ Warren (R) ✗
1949	Chester B. Bowles (D)	William T. Carroll (D)	Winifred McDonald (D)	William L. Hadden (R)	Joseph A. Adorno (R)	Raymond S. Thatcher (D)	23D, 13R	180R, 92D	Raymond E. Baldwin (R)	Brien McMahon (D)	3D, 3R	Dewey/ Warren (R) ✗
1950	Chester B. Bowles (D)	William T. Carroll (D)	Winifred McDonald (D)	William L. Hadden (R)	Joseph A. Adorno (R)	Raymond S. Thatcher (D)	23D, 13R	180R, 92D	William Benton (D)	Brien McMahon (D)	3D, 3R	Dewey/ Warren (R) ✗
1951	John Davis Lodge (R)	Edward N. Allen (R)	Alice Leopold (R)	George C. Conway (R)	Joseph A. Adorno (R)	Fred R. Zeller (R)	19D, 17R	190R, 87D	William Benton (D)	Brien McMahon (D)	4R, 2D	Dewey/ Warren (R) ✗
1952	John Davis Lodge (R)	Edward N. Allen (R)	Alice Leopold (R)	George C. Conway (R)	Joseph A. Adorno (R)	Fred R. Zeller (R)	19D, 17R	190R, 87D	William Benton (D)	William A. Purtell (R)	4R, 2D	Eisenhower/ Nixon (R) ✓
1953	John Davis Lodge (R)	Edward N. Allen (R)	Alice Leopold (R)	George C. Conway (R)	Joseph A. Adorno (R)	Fred R. Zeller (R)	22R, 14D	221R, 58D	William A. Purtell (R)	Prescott Bush (R)	5R, 1D	Eisenhower/ Nixon (R) ✓
1953	John Davis Lodge (R)	Edward N. Allen (R)	Charles B. Keats (R)	William L. Beers (R)	Joseph A. Adorno (R)	Fred R. Zeller (R)	22R, 14D	221R, 58D	William A. Purtell (R)	Prescott Bush (R)	5R, 1D	Eisenhower/ Nixon (R) ✓
1954	John Davis Lodge (R)	Edward N. Allen (R)	Charles B. Keats (R)	William L. Beers (R)	Joseph A. Adorno (R)	Fred R. Zeller (R)	22R, 14D	221R, 58D	William A. Purtell (R)	Prescott Bush (R)	5R, 1D	Eisenhower/ Nixon (R) ✓
1955	Abraham Ribicoff (D) (Note: Resigned to become United States Secretary of Health, Education, and Welfare.)	Charles W. Jewett (D)	Mildred P. Allen (R)	John J. Bracken (R)	John Ottaviano Jr. (R)	Fred R. Zeller (R)	20D, 16R	184R, 92D, 3I	William A. Purtell (R)	Prescott Bush (R)	5R, 1D	Eisenhower/ Nixon (R) ✓
1956	Abraham Ribicoff (D)	Charles W. Jewett (D)	Mildred P. Allen (R)	John J. Bracken (R)	John Ottaviano Jr. (R)	Fred R. Zeller (R)	20D, 16R	184R, 92D, 3I	William A. Purtell (R)	Prescott Bush (R)	5R, 1D	Eisenhower/ Nixon (R) ✓
1957	Abraham Ribicoff (D)	Charles W. Jewett (D)	Mildred P. Allen (R)	John J. Bracken (R)	John Ottaviano Jr. (R)	Fred R. Zeller (R)	31R, 5D	249R, 30D	William A. Purtell (R)	Prescott Bush (R)	6R	Eisenhower/ Nixon (R) ✓
1958	Abraham Ribicoff (D)	Charles W. Jewett (D)	Mildred P. Allen (R)	John J. Bracken (R)	John Ottaviano Jr. (R)	Fred R. Zeller (R)	31R, 5D	249R, 30D	William A. Purtell (R)	Prescott Bush (R)	6R	Eisenhower/ Nixon (R) ✓
1959	Abraham Ribicoff (D)	John Dempsey (D)	Ella Grasso (D)	Albert L. Coles (D)	John A. Speziale (D)	Raymond S. Thatcher (D)	29D, 7R	141D, 138R	Thomas J. Dodd (D)	Prescott Bush (R)	6D	Eisenhower/ Nixon (R) ✓
1960	Abraham Ribicoff (D)	John Dempsey (D)	Ella Grasso (D)	Albert L. Coles (D)	John A. Speziale (D)	Raymond S. Thatcher (D)	29D, 7R	141D, 138R	Thomas J. Dodd (D)	Prescott Bush (R)	6D	Kennedy/ Johnson (D) ✓
1961	Abraham Ribicoff (D)	John Dempsey (D)	Ella Grasso (D)	Albert L. Coles (D)	Donald J. Irwin (D)	Raymond S. Thatcher (D)	24D, 12R	176R, 118D	Thomas J. Dodd (D)	Prescott Bush (R)	4D, 2R	Kennedy/ Johnson (D) ✓
1961	John Dempsey (D)	Anthony J. Armentano (D)	Ella Grasso (D)	Albert L. Coles (D)	Donald J. Irwin (D)	Raymond S. Thatcher (D)	24D, 12R	176R, 118D	Thomas J. Dodd (D)	Prescott Bush (R)	4D, 2R	Kennedy/ Johnson (D) ✓
1962	John Dempsey (D)	Anthony J. Armentano (D)	Ella Grasso (D)	Albert L. Coles (D)	Donald J. Irwin (D)	Raymond S. Thatcher (D)	24D, 12R	176R, 118D	Thomas J. Dodd (D)	Prescott Bush (R)	4D, 2R	Kennedy/ Johnson (D) ✓
1963	John Dempsey (D)	Samuel J. Tedesco (D)	Ella Grasso (D)	Harold M. Mulvey (D)	Gerald Lamb (D)	Raymond S. Thatcher (D)	23D, 13R	183R, 111D	Thomas J. Dodd (D)	Abraham Ribicoff (D)	5D, 1R	Kennedy/ Johnson (D) ✓
1964	John Dempsey (D)	Samuel J. Tedesco (D)	Ella Grasso (D)	Harold M. Mulvey (D)	Gerald Lamb (D)	Raymond S. Thatcher (D)	23D, 13R	183R, 111D	Thomas J. Dodd (D)	Abraham Ribicoff (D)	5D, 1R	Johnson/ Humphrey (D) ✓
1965	John Dempsey (D)	Fred J. Doocy (D)	Ella Grasso (D)	Harold M. Mulvey (D)	Gerald Lamb (D)	Raymond S. Thatcher (D)	23D, 13R	183R, 111D	Thomas J. Dodd (D)	Abraham Ribicoff (D)	6D	Johnson/ Humphrey (D) ✓
1966	John Dempsey (D)	Fred J. Doocy (D)	Ella Grasso (D)	Harold M. Mulvey (D)	Gerald Lamb (D)	James J. Casey (D)	23D, 13R	183R, 111D	Thomas J. Dodd (D)	Abraham Ribicoff (D)	6D	Johnson/ Humphrey (D) ✓
1967	John Dempsey (D)	Attilio R. Frassinelli (D)	Ella Grasso (D)	Robert K. Killian (D)	Gerald Lamb (D)	Louis Gladstone (D)	25D, 11R	117D, 60R	Thomas J. Dodd (D)	Abraham Ribicoff (D)	5D, 1R	Johnson/ Humphrey (D) ✓
1968	John Dempsey (D)	Attilio R. Frassinelli (D)	Ella Grasso (D)	Robert K. Killian (D)	Gerald Lamb (D)	Louis Gladstone (D)	25D, 11R	117D, 60R	Thomas J. Dodd (D)	Abraham Ribicoff (D)	5D, 1R	Humphrey/ Muskie (D) ✗
1969	John Dempsey (D)	Attilio R. Frassinelli (D)	Ella Grasso (D)	Robert K. Killian (D)	Gerald Lamb (D)	Louis Gladstone (D)	24D, 12R	110D, 67R	Thomas J. Dodd (D)	Abraham Ribicoff (D)	4D, 2R	Humphrey/ Muskie (D) ✗
1970	John Dempsey (D)	Attilio R. Frassinelli (D)	Ella Grasso (D)	Robert K. Killian (D)	John A. Iorio (D)	Louis Gladstone (D)	24D, 12R	110D, 67R	Thomas J. Dodd (D)	Abraham Ribicoff (D)	3D, 3R	Humphrey/ Muskie (D) ✗
1971	Thomas Meskill (R)	T. Clark Hull (R)	Gloria Schaffer (D)	Robert K. Killian (D)	Robert I. Berdon (R)	Nathan Agostinelli (R)	19D, 17R	99D, 78R	Lowell Weicker (R)	Abraham Ribicoff (D)	4D, 2R	Humphrey/ Muskie (D) ✗
1972	Thomas Meskill (R)	T. Clark Hull (R)	Gloria Schaffer (D)	Robert K. Killian (D)	Robert I. Berdon (R)	Nathan Agostinelli (R)	19D, 17R	99D, 78R	Lowell Weicker (R)	Abraham Ribicoff (D)	4D, 2R	Nixon/ Agnew (R) ✓
1973	Thomas Meskill (R)	Peter L. Cashman (R)	Gloria Schaffer (D)	Robert K. Killian (D)	Alden A. Ives (R)	Nathan Agostinelli (R)	23R, 13D	93R, 58D	Lowell Weicker (R)	Abraham Ribicoff (D)	3D, 3R	Nixon/ Agnew (R) ✓
1974	Thomas Meskill (R)	Peter L. Cashman (R)	Gloria Schaffer (D)	Robert K. Killian (D)	Alden A. Ives (R)	Nathan Agostinelli (R)	23R, 13D	93R, 58D	Lowell Weicker (R)	Abraham Ribicoff (D)	3D, 3R	Nixon/ Agnew (R) ✓
1975	Ella Grasso (D) (Note: Resigned for health reasons on December 31, 1980.)	Robert K. Killian (D)	Gloria Schaffer (D)	Carl R. Ajello (D)	Henry E. Parker (D)	J. Edward Caldwell (D)	29D, 7R	118D, 33R	Lowell Weicker (R)	Abraham Ribicoff (D)	4D, 2R	Nixon/ Agnew (R) ✓
1976	Ella Grasso (D)	Robert K. Killian (D)	Gloria Schaffer (D)	Carl R. Ajello (D)	Henry E. Parker (D)	J. Edward Caldwell (D)	29D, 7R	118D, 33R	Lowell Weicker (R)	Abraham Ribicoff (D)	4D, 2R	Ford/ Dole (R) ✗
1977	Ella Grasso (D)	Robert K. Killian (D)	Gloria Schaffer (D)	Carl R. Ajello (D)	Henry E. Parker (D)	J. Edward Caldwell (D)	22D, 14R	93D, 58R	Lowell Weicker (R)	Abraham Ribicoff (D)	4D, 2R	Ford/ Dole (R) ✗
1978	Ella Grasso (D)	Robert K. Killian (D)	Gloria Schaffer (D)	Carl R. Ajello (D)	Henry E. Parker (D)	J. Edward Caldwell (D)	22D, 14R	93D, 58R	Lowell Weicker (R)	Abraham Ribicoff (D)	4D, 2R	Ford/ Dole (R) ✗
1978	Ella Grasso (D)	Robert K. Killian (D)	Henry S. Cohn (D)	Carl R. Ajello (D)	Henry E. Parker (D)	J. Edward Caldwell (D)	22D, 14R	93D, 58R	Lowell Weicker (R)	Abraham Ribicoff (D)	4D, 2R	Ford/ Dole (R) ✗
1979	Ella Grasso (D)	William A. O'Neill (D)	Barbara B. Kennelly (D) (Note: Elected to United States House of Representatives.)	Carl R. Ajello (D)	Henry E. Parker (D)	J. Edward Caldwell (D)	26D, 10R	103D, 48R	Lowell Weicker (R)	Abraham Ribicoff (D)	5D, 1R	Ford/ Dole (R) ✗
1980	Ella Grasso (D)	William A. O'Neill (D)	Barbara B. Kennelly (D)	Carl R. Ajello (D)	Henry E. Parker (D)	J. Edward Caldwell (D)	26D, 10R	103D, 48R	Lowell Weicker (R)	Abraham Ribicoff (D)	5D, 1R	Ford/ Dole (R) ✗
1980	William A. O'Neill (D)	Joseph J. Fauliso (D)	Barbara B. Kennelly (D)	Carl R. Ajello (D)	Henry E. Parker (D)	J. Edward Caldwell (D)	26D, 10R	103D, 48R	Lowell Weicker (R)	Abraham Ribicoff (D)	5D, 1R	Reagan/ Bush (R) ✓
1981	William A. O'Neill (D)	Joseph J. Fauliso (D)	Barbara B. Kennelly (D)	Carl R. Ajello (D)	Henry E. Parker (D)	J. Edward Caldwell (D)	23D, 13R	83D, 68R	Lowell Weicker (R)	Chris Dodd (D)	4D, 2R	Reagan/ Bush (R) ✓
1982	William A. O'Neill (D)	Joseph J. Fauliso (D)	Barbara B. Kennelly (D)	Carl R. Ajello (D)	Henry E. Parker (D)	J. Edward Caldwell (D)	23D, 13R	83D, 68R	Lowell Weicker (R)	Chris Dodd (D)	4D, 2R	Reagan/ Bush (R) ✓
1982	William A. O'Neill (D)	Joseph J. Fauliso (D)	Maura Melley (D)	Carl R. Ajello (D)	Henry E. Parker (D)	J. Edward Caldwell (D)	23D, 13R	83D, 68R	Lowell Weicker (R)	Chris Dodd (D)	4D, 2R	Reagan/ Bush (R) ✓
1983	William A. O'Neill (D)	Joseph J. Fauliso (D)	Julia Tashjian (D)	Joe Lieberman (D)	Henry E. Parker (D)	J. Edward Caldwell (D)	23D, 13R	87D, 64R	Lowell Weicker (R)	Chris Dodd (D)	4D, 2R	Reagan/ Bush (R) ✓
1984	William A. O'Neill (D)	Joseph J. Fauliso (D)	Julia Tashjian (D)	Joe Lieberman (D)	Henry E. Parker (D)	J. Edward Caldwell (D)	23D, 13R	87D, 64R	Lowell Weicker (R)	Chris Dodd (D)	4D, 2R	Reagan/ Bush (R) ✓
1985	William A. O'Neill (D)	Joseph J. Fauliso (D)	Julia Tashjian (D)	Joe Lieberman (D)	Henry E. Parker (D)	J. Edward Caldwell (D)	24R, 12D	85R, 66D	Lowell Weicker (R)	Chris Dodd (D)	3D, 3R	Reagan/ Bush (R) ✓
1986	William A. O'Neill (D)	Joseph J. Fauliso (D)	Julia Tashjian (D)	Joe Lieberman (D)	Joan R. Kemler (D)	J. Edward Caldwell (D)	24R, 12D	85R, 66D	Lowell Weicker (R)	Chris Dodd (D)	3D, 3R	Reagan/ Bush (R) ✓
1987	William A. O'Neill (D)	Joseph J. Fauliso (D)	Julia Tashjian (D)	Joe Lieberman (D)	Francisco L. Borges (D)	J. Edward Caldwell (D)	25D, 11R	92D, 59R	Lowell Weicker (R)	Chris Dodd (D)	3D, 3R	Reagan/ Bush (R) ✓
1988	William A. O'Neill (D)	Joseph J. Fauliso (D)	Julia Tashjian (D)	Joe Lieberman (D)	Francisco L. Borges (D)	J. Edward Caldwell (D)	25D, 11R	92D, 59R	Lowell Weicker (R)	Chris Dodd (D)	3D, 3R	Bush/ Quayle (R) ✓
1989	William A. O'Neill (D)	Joseph J. Fauliso (D)	Julia Tashjian (D)	Clarine Nardi Riddle (D)	Francisco L. Borges (D)	J. Edward Caldwell (D)	23D, 13R	88D, 63R	Joe Lieberman (D)	Chris Dodd (D)	3D, 3R	Bush/ Quayle (R) ✓
1990	William A. O'Neill (D)	Joseph J. Fauliso (D)	Julia Tashjian (D)	Clarine Nardi Riddle (D)	Francisco L. Borges (D)	J. Edward Caldwell (D)	23D, 13R	88D, 63R	Joe Lieberman (D)	Chris Dodd (D)	3D, 3R	Bush/ Quayle (R) ✓
1991	Lowell Weicker (ACP)	Eunice Groark (ACP)	Pauline R. Kezer (R)	Richard Blumenthal (D)	Francisco L. Borges (D)	Bill Curry (D)	20D, 16R	88D, 63R	Joe Lieberman (D)	Chris Dodd (D)	3D, 3R	Bush/ Quayle (R) ✓
1992	Lowell Weicker (ACP)	Eunice Groark (ACP)	Pauline R. Kezer (R)	Richard Blumenthal (D)	Francisco L. Borges (D)	Bill Curry (D)	20D, 16R	88D, 63R	Joe Lieberman (D)	Chris Dodd (D)	3D, 3R	Clinton/ Gore (D) ✓
1993	Lowell Weicker (ACP)	Eunice Groark (ACP)	Pauline R. Kezer (R)	Richard Blumenthal (D)	Joseph M. Suggs Jr. (D)	Bill Curry (D)	19D, 17R	87D, 64R	Joe Lieberman (D)	Chris Dodd (D)	3D, 3R	Clinton/ Gore (D) ✓
1994	Lowell Weicker (ACP)	Eunice Groark (ACP)	Pauline R. Kezer (R)	Richard Blumenthal (D)	Joseph M. Suggs Jr. (D)	Bill Curry (D)	19D, 17R	87D, 64R	Joe Lieberman (D)	Chris Dodd (D)	3D, 3R	Clinton/ Gore (D) ✓
1995	John G. Rowland (R) (Note: Resigned effective July 1, 2004.)	Jodi Rell (R)	Miles S. Rapoport (D)	Richard Blumenthal (D)	Christopher Burnham (R)	Nancy Wyman (D)	19R, 17D	91D, 60R	Joe Lieberman (D)	Chris Dodd (D)	3D, 3R	Clinton/ Gore (D) ✓
1996	John G. Rowland (R)	Jodi Rell (R)	Miles S. Rapoport (D)	Richard Blumenthal (D)	Christopher Burnham (R)	Nancy Wyman (D)	19R, 17D	91D, 60R	Joe Lieberman (D)	Chris Dodd (D)	3D, 3R	Clinton/ Gore (D) ✓
1997	John G. Rowland (R)	Jodi Rell (R)	Miles S. Rapoport (D)	Richard Blumenthal (D)	Christopher Burnham (R)	Nancy Wyman (D)	19D, 17R	96D, 55R	Joe Lieberman (D)	Chris Dodd (D)	4D, 2R	Clinton/ Gore (D) ✓
1997	John G. Rowland (R)	Jodi Rell (R)	Miles S. Rapoport (D)	Richard Blumenthal (D)	Paul J. Silvester (R) (Note: In 1997, Governor John Rowland appointed Silvester to fill a vacancy in the treasurer's office.)	Nancy Wyman (D)	19D, 17R	96D, 55R	Joe Lieberman (D)	Chris Dodd (D)	4D, 2R	Clinton/ Gore (D) ✓
1998	John G. Rowland (R)	Jodi Rell (R)	Miles S. Rapoport (D)	Richard Blumenthal (D)	Paul J. Silvester (R)	Nancy Wyman (D)	19D, 17R	96D, 55R	Joe Lieberman (D)	Chris Dodd (D)	4D, 2R	Clinton/ Gore (D) ✓
1999	John G. Rowland (R)	Jodi Rell (R)	Susan Bysiewicz (D)	Richard Blumenthal (D)	Denise Nappier (D)	Nancy Wyman (D)	19D, 17R	96D, 55R	Joe Lieberman (D)	Chris Dodd (D)	4D, 2R	Clinton/ Gore (D) ✓
2000	John G. Rowland (R)	Jodi Rell (R)	Susan Bysiewicz (D)	Richard Blumenthal (D)	Denise Nappier (D)	Nancy Wyman (D)	19D, 17R	96D, 55R	Joe Lieberman (D)	Chris Dodd (D)	4D, 2R	Gore/ Lieberman (D) ✗
2001	John G. Rowland (R)	Jodi Rell (R)	Susan Bysiewicz (D)	Richard Blumenthal (D)	Denise Nappier (D)	Nancy Wyman (D)	21D, 15R	100D, 51R	Joe Lieberman (D)	Chris Dodd (D)	3D, 3R	Gore/ Lieberman (D) ✗
2002	John G. Rowland (R)	Jodi Rell (R)	Susan Bysiewicz (D)	Richard Blumenthal (D)	Denise Nappier (D)	Nancy Wyman (D)	21D, 15R	100D, 51R	Joe Lieberman (D)	Chris Dodd (D)	3D, 3R	Gore/ Lieberman (D) ✗
2003	John G. Rowland (R)	Jodi Rell (R)	Susan Bysiewicz (D)	Richard Blumenthal (D)	Denise Nappier (D)	Nancy Wyman (D)	21D, 15R	94D, 57R	Joe Lieberman (D)	Chris Dodd (D)	3R, 2D	Gore/ Lieberman (D) ✗
2004	John G. Rowland (R)	Jodi Rell (R)	Susan Bysiewicz (D)	Richard Blumenthal (D)	Denise Nappier (D)	Nancy Wyman (D)	21D, 15R	94D, 57R	Joe Lieberman (D)	Chris Dodd (D)	3R, 2D	Kerry/ Edwards (D) ✗
2004	Jodi Rell (R)	Kevin Sullivan (D) (Note: As president pro tempore of the state Senate, assumed office upon the resignation of his predecessor.)	Susan Bysiewicz (D)	Richard Blumenthal (D)	Denise Nappier (D)	Nancy Wyman (D)	21D, 15R	94D, 57R	Joe Lieberman (D)	Chris Dodd (D)	3R, 2D	Kerry/ Edwards (D) ✗
2005	Jodi Rell (R)	Kevin Sullivan (D)	Susan Bysiewicz (D)	Richard Blumenthal (D)	Denise Nappier (D)	Nancy Wyman (D)	24D, 12R	99D, 52R	Joe Lieberman (D)	Chris Dodd (D)	3R, 2D	Kerry/ Edwards (D) ✗
2006	Jodi Rell (R)	Kevin Sullivan (D)	Susan Bysiewicz (D)	Richard Blumenthal (D)	Denise Nappier (D)	Nancy Wyman (D)	24D, 12R	99D, 52R	Joe Lieberman (D)	Chris Dodd (D)	3R, 2D	Kerry/ Edwards (D) ✗
2007	Jodi Rell (R)	Michael Fedele (R)	Susan Bysiewicz (D)	Richard Blumenthal (D)	Denise Nappier (D)	Nancy Wyman (D)	24D, 12R	107D, 44R	Joe Lieberman (ID)	Chris Dodd (D)	4D, 1R	Kerry/ Edwards (D) ✗
2008	Jodi Rell (R)	Michael Fedele (R)	Susan Bysiewicz (D)	Richard Blumenthal (D)	Denise Nappier (D)	Nancy Wyman (D)	23D, 13R (Note: Republican Bob Russo was elected in a special election on March 11, 2008.)	107D, 44R	Joe Lieberman (ID)	Chris Dodd (D)	4D, 1R	Obama/ Biden (D) ✓
2009	Jodi Rell (R)	Michael Fedele (R)	Susan Bysiewicz (D)	Richard Blumenthal (D)	Denise Nappier (D)	Nancy Wyman (D)	24D, 12R	114D, 37R	Joe Lieberman (ID)	Chris Dodd (D)	5D	Obama/ Biden (D) ✓
2010	Jodi Rell (R)	Michael Fedele (R)	Susan Bysiewicz (D)	Richard Blumenthal (D)	Denise Nappier (D)	Nancy Wyman (D)	24D, 12R	114D, 37R	Joe Lieberman (ID)	Chris Dodd (D)	5D	Obama/ Biden (D) ✓
2011	Dannel Malloy (D)	Nancy Wyman (D)	Denise Merrill (D) (Note: Resigned effective June 30, 2022.)	George Jepsen (D)	Denise Nappier (D)	Kevin Lembo (D) (Note: Resigned for health reasons on December 31, 2021.)	22D, 14R	99D, 52R	Joe Lieberman (ID)	Richard Blumenthal (D)	5D	Obama/ Biden (D) ✓
2012	Dannel Malloy (D)	Nancy Wyman (D)	Denise Merrill (D)	George Jepsen (D)	Denise Nappier (D)	Kevin Lembo (D)	22D, 14R	99D, 52R	Joe Lieberman (ID)	Richard Blumenthal (D)	5D	Obama/ Biden (D) ✓
2013	Dannel Malloy (D)	Nancy Wyman (D)	Denise Merrill (D)	George Jepsen (D)	Denise Nappier (D)	Kevin Lembo (D)	22D, 14R	98D, 53R	Chris Murphy (D)	Richard Blumenthal (D)	5D	Obama/ Biden (D) ✓
2014	Dannel Malloy (D)	Nancy Wyman (D)	Denise Merrill (D)	George Jepsen (D)	Denise Nappier (D)	Kevin Lembo (D)	22D, 14R	97D, 54R (Note: Republican Sam Belsito was elected in a special election on June 11, 2013, after the session.)	Chris Murphy (D)	Richard Blumenthal (D)	5D	Obama/ Biden (D) ✓
2015	Dannel Malloy (D)	Nancy Wyman (D)	Denise Merrill (D)	George Jepsen (D)	Denise Nappier (D)	Kevin Lembo (D)	21D, 15R	87D, 64R	Chris Murphy (D)	Richard Blumenthal (D)	5D	Obama/ Biden (D) ✓
2016	Dannel Malloy (D)	Nancy Wyman (D)	Denise Merrill (D)	George Jepsen (D)	Denise Nappier (D)	Kevin Lembo (D)	21D, 15R	87D, 64R	Chris Murphy (D)	Richard Blumenthal (D)	5D	Clinton/ Kaine (D) ✗
2017	Dannel Malloy (D)	Nancy Wyman (D)	Denise Merrill (D)	George Jepsen (D)	Denise Nappier (D)	Kevin Lembo (D)	18D, 18R (Note: A power-sharing agreement was reached dividing control of the chamber, splitting the committees 50-50 and giving power to the Republicans to call procedural votes to bring legislation to the chamber floor, while Lt. Gov. Wyman retained the ability to break tied votes.)	80D, 71R	Chris Murphy (D)	Richard Blumenthal (D)	5D	Clinton/ Kaine (D) ✗
2018	Dannel Malloy (D)	Nancy Wyman (D)	Denise Merrill (D)	George Jepsen (D)	Denise Nappier (D)	Kevin Lembo (D)	18D, 18R	80D, 71R	Chris Murphy (D)	Richard Blumenthal (D)	5D	Clinton/ Kaine (D) ✗
2019	Ned Lamont (D)	Susan Bysiewicz (D)	Denise Merrill (D)	William Tong (D)	Shawn Wooden (D)	Kevin Lembo (D)	22D, 14R (Note: Republicans picked up a State Senate and State House seat in a series of special elections in February 2019.)	91D, 60R	Chris Murphy (D)	Richard Blumenthal (D)	5D	Clinton/ Kaine (D) ✗
2020	Ned Lamont (D)	Susan Bysiewicz (D)	Denise Merrill (D)	William Tong (D)	Shawn Wooden (D)	Kevin Lembo (D)	22D, 14R	91D, 60R	Chris Murphy (D)	Richard Blumenthal (D)	5D	Biden/ Harris (D) ✓
2021	Ned Lamont (D)	Susan Bysiewicz (D)	Denise Merrill (D)	William Tong (D)	Shawn Wooden (D)	Kevin Lembo (D)	24D, 12R	97D, 54R	Chris Murphy (D)	Richard Blumenthal (D)	5D	Biden/ Harris (D) ✓
2022	Ned Lamont (D)	Susan Bysiewicz (D)	Denise Merrill (D)	William Tong (D)	Shawn Wooden (D)	Natalie Braswell (D) (Note: In 2021, Governor Ned Lamont appointed Braswell to fill a vacancy in the comptroller's office.)	23D, 13R (Note: Republican Ryan Fazio was elected in a special election on August 17, 2021, after the session.)	97D, 54R	Chris Murphy (D)	Richard Blumenthal (D)	5D	Biden/ Harris (D) ✓
2022	Ned Lamont (D)	Susan Bysiewicz (D)	Mark Kohler (D) (Note: In 2022, Governor Ned Lamont appointed Kohler to fill a vacancy in the secretary of the state's office.)	William Tong (D)	Shawn Wooden (D)	Natalie Braswell (D)	23D, 13R	97D, 54R	Chris Murphy (D)	Richard Blumenthal (D)	5D	Biden/ Harris (D) ✓
2023	Ned Lamont (D)	Susan Bysiewicz (D)	Stephanie Thomas (D)	William Tong (D)	Erick Russell (D)	Sean Scanlon (D)	24D, 12R	98D, 53R	Chris Murphy (D)	Richard Blumenthal (D)	5D	Biden/ Harris (D) ✓
2024	Ned Lamont (D)	Susan Bysiewicz (D)	Stephanie Thomas (D)	William Tong (D)	Erick Russell (D)	Sean Scanlon (D)	24D, 12R	98D, 53R	Chris Murphy (D)	Richard Blumenthal (D)	5D	Harris/ Walz (D) ✗
2025	Ned Lamont (D)	Susan Bysiewicz (D)	Stephanie Thomas (D)	William Tong (D)	Erick Russell (D)	Sean Scanlon (D)	25D, 11R	102D, 49R	Chris Murphy (D)	Richard Blumenthal (D)	5D	Harris/ Walz (D) ✗
2026	Ned Lamont (D)	Susan Bysiewicz (D)	Stephanie Thomas (D)	William Tong (D)	Erick Russell (D)	Sean Scanlon (D)	25D, 11R	102D, 49R	Chris Murphy (D)	Richard Blumenthal (D)	5D	Harris/ Walz (D) ✗
2027	Ned Lamont (D)	Susan Bysiewicz (D)	Stephanie Thomas (D)	William Tong (D)	Erick Russell (D)	Sean Scanlon (D)	33D, 3R	116D, 35R	Chris Murphy (D)	Richard Blumenthal (D)	5D	Harris/ Walz (D) ✗

== See also ==
- Politics in Connecticut
