= Catlin (surname) =

Catlin, Catlyn or Catelyn is a surname, and may refer to:

- Abijah Catlin (1805–1891), American politician
- Albert L. Catlin (c.1809–1884), American politician
- Albertus W. Catlin (1868–1933), US Marine Corps Brigadier General and Medal of Honor recipient
- Alf Catlin (1875–1944), Australian rules footballer
- Amos P. Catlin (1823–1900), California legislator
- Andrew Catlin (born 1960), English photographer and cinematographer
- Beth Catlin (born 1958), American autistic savant
- Bob Catlin (born 1965), Australians soccer player
- Charles A. Catlin (1849–1916), American chemist and inventor
- Charles L. Catlin (1842–1901), American lawyer and politician
- Charlotte Enty Catlin (1903–1968), American pianist
- Chris Catlin (born 1981), British jockey
- David Catlin (born 1952), American mathematician
- David Catlin-Birch, British musician
- Don Catlin (1938–2024), American anti-doping scientist
- George Catlin (1796–1872), American painter
- George Catlin (musical instrument maker) (1778–1852), American maker of woodwind instruments
- George Catlin (political scientist) (1896–1979), English academic and politician
- George S. Catlin (1808–1851), American politician
- Hampton Lintorn-Catlin (born 1982), American programming language inventor and author
- Isaac S. Catlin (1835–1916), American lawyer and army officer
- John Catlin (golfer) (born 1990), American golfer
- John Catlin (politician) (1803–1874), American politician
- John C. Catlin (1871–1951), American lawyer and politician
- Julius Catlin (1798–1888), American politician
- Karen Catlin (born 1963), American technology executive
- Kelly Catlin (1995–2019), American racing cyclist
- Lovisa Card-Catlin (1846–1925), American artist and educator
- Marc Catlin, American politician
- Mark Catlin, Sr., (1882–1956) American football coach, politician and lawyer
- Mark Catlin, Jr. (1910–1986), American politician and lawyer
- Nathaniel Catelyn (c.1589–1637), politician and judge in Ireland
- Sir Nevill Catlin (1634–1702), English landowner and politician
- Nicholas Catlin (born 1989), English hockey player
- Norman Catlin (1918–1941), English footballer
- Paul A. Catlin (1948–1995), American mathematician, graph theory
- Richard Catlin (1583–1662), English landowner and politician
- Sam Catlin, American television writer, director and producer
- Sid Catlin (born 1949), Australian rules footballer
- Stanton Catlin (1915–1997), American art historian
- Steven David Catlin (born 1944), American serial killer
- Ted Catlin (1910–1990), English footballer
- Teresa Catlin (born 1969), British tennis player
- Theron E. Catlin (1878–1960), American politician
- Tom Catlin (1931–2008), American football player and coach
- Victoria Catlin (1952–2024), American actress

== See also ==
- Catling
