= Catlin =

Catlin may refer to:

== People with the surname ==
- Catlin (surname)

== Places ==
New Zealand

- The Catlins, an area of New Zealand

United States

- Catlin Township, Marion County, Kansas
- Catlin, Illinois, a village in Vermilion County, Illinois
- Catlin Township, Vermilion County, Illinois
- Catlin, Indiana, an unincorporated community in Parke County
- Catlin, New York, a town in Chemung County, New York

== Other ==
- Catlin (surgery), an archaic medical instrument
- The Catlin Gabel School, a private school southwest of Portland, Oregon
- The Catlins (TV series), on the TBS cable network
- Catlin Group Limited, an international specialty insurance and reinsurance company
- Chris Cattlin (born 1946), English footballer
- Mt Cattlin mine, mine in Western Australia
