= Louis Gladstone =

American politician (1927–2016)

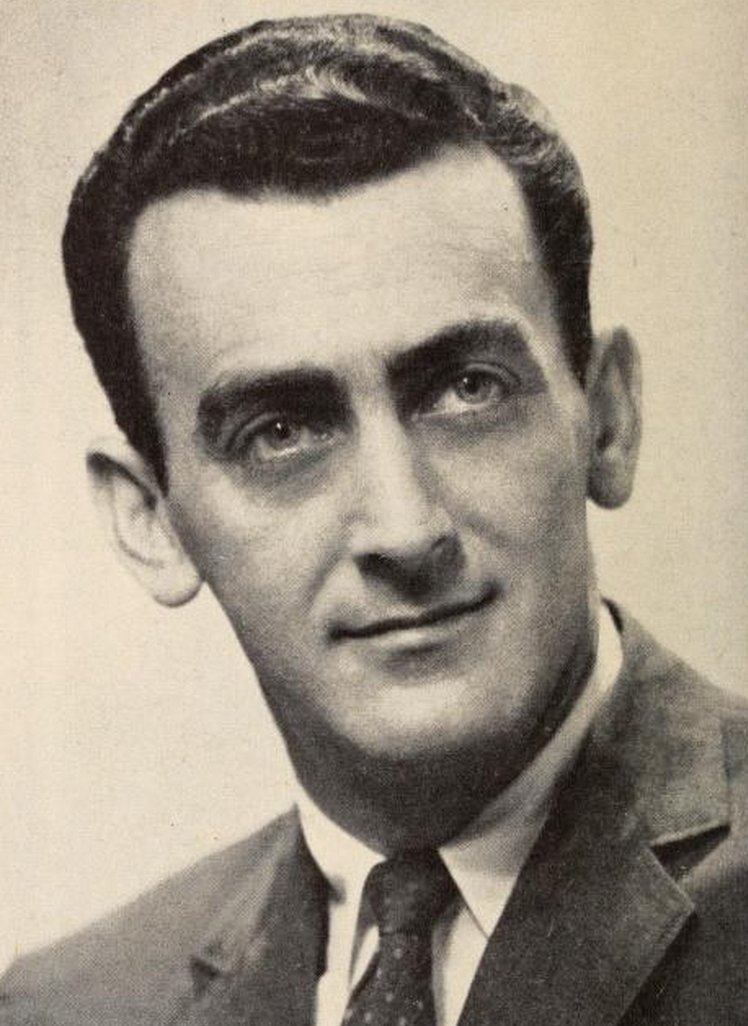

Member of the Connecticut State Senate from the 22nd District
- In office 1958–?

Comptroller of Connecticut
- In office 1967–1971
- Governor: Raymond P. Shafer
- Preceded by: James J. Casey
- Succeeded by: Nathan G. Agostinelli

Personal details
- Born: May 22, 1927 Bridgeport, Connecticut, U.S.
- Died: April 10, 2016 (aged 88) Bridgeport, Connecticut, U.S.
- Party: Democratic
- Spouse: Joan Rockey
- Education: University of Connecticut; New York University
- Occupation: Attorney

Louis I. Gladstone (May 22, 1927 – April 10, 2016) was an American politician from Connecticut.

Gladstone was born in 1927 in Bridgeport, Connecticut. He attended Central High School, the University of Bridgeport, University of Connecticut, and New York University Law School, earning a law degree at the latter. He is a member of the Connecticut Bar. He served in the United States Navy aboard the USS Franklin D. Roosevelt during World War II. Gladstone served on the City Council of Bridgeport, first elected in 1955, serving as minority leader. He was elected to the state senate in 1958 while still serving on the Common Council, as president. In the state senate, he served on the Public Utilities Commission and Cities, Boroughs, Roads and Bridges Committee. During his time in the state senate he also served a term as majority leader. Gladstone also served as Comptroller of Connecticut from 1967 to 1970.

He married Joan Rockey and has three children, two daughters and a son. He was a member of the Jewish Community Center in Bridgeport. Gladstone died in 2016 at the age of 88.

Party political offices
Preceded by Raymond S. Thatcher	Democratic nominee for Connecticut State Comptroller; 1966	Succeeded by J. Edward Caldwell
Political offices
Preceded by James J. Casey	Comptroller of Connecticut; 1967–1971	Succeeded by Nathan G. Agostinelli
