= Senator Catlin =

Senator Catlin may refer to:

- Abijah Catlin (1805–1891), Connecticut State Senate
- Amos P. Catlin (1823–1900), California State Senate
- George S. Catlin (1808–1851), Connecticut State Senate
- Marc Catlin (fl. 2010s–2020s), Colorado State Senate
