= Catling =

Catling is an English surname that may also refer to a kitten, a juvenile cat. Notable people with the surname include:

- Brian Catling (1948–2022), English sculptor, poet, novelist, filmmaker and performance artist
- Hector Catling (1924–2013), British archaeologist
- Patrick Skene Catling (1925–2026), British novelist, children's book author, and book reviewer
- Charlotte Skene-Catling, British architect
- Richard Catling (1912–2005), British police officer in British Palestine and Commissioner of Police in Kenya
- Richard W. V. Catling, British archaeologist, son of archaeologist Hector W. Catling
- Thomas Catling (1838–1920), editor of Lloyd's Weekly News, author of My Life's Pilgrimage (1911)
- Thomas Thurgood Catling (1863–?), son of Thomas Catling, editor for Lloyd's News and other journals

It may also refer to:

- Catlin (surgery), a long, double-bladed surgical knife
