= 1958 Connecticut gubernatorial election =

- November 4, 1958
- Turnout: 81.17%
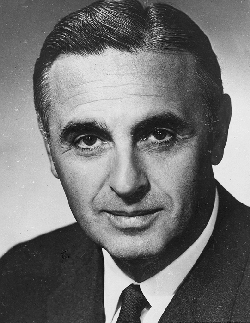

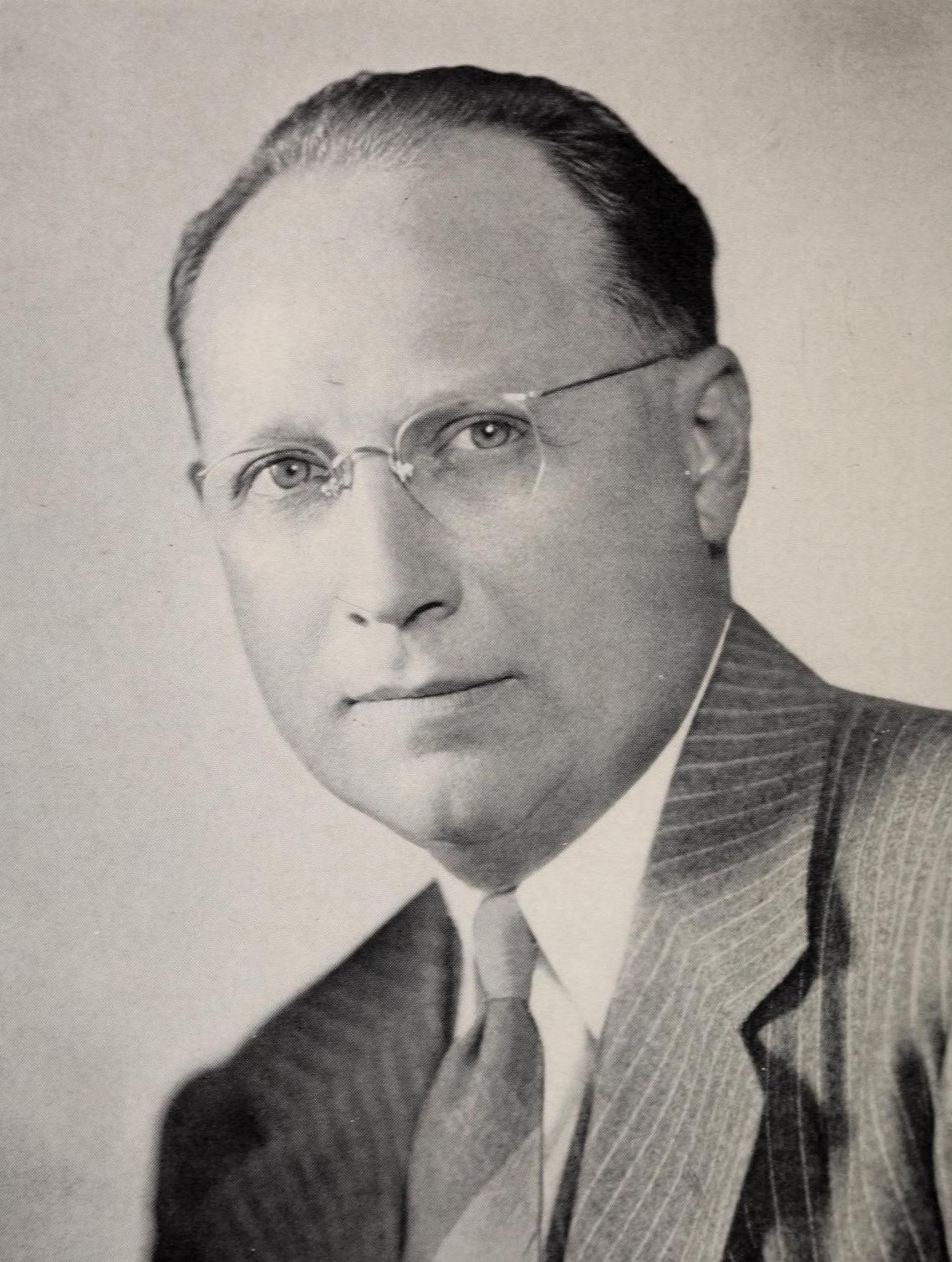
Nominee	Abraham Ribicoff	Fred R. Zeller
Party	Democratic	Republican
Popular vote	607,012	360,644
Percentage	62.29%	37.01%
- Ribicoff: 50–60% 60–70% 70–80% Zeller: 50–60% 60–70% 70–80%
Governor before election
Abraham Ribicoff
Democratic
Elected Governor
Abraham Ribicoff
Democratic

The 1958 Connecticut gubernatorial election was held on November 4, 1958. Incumbent Democrat Abraham Ribicoff defeated Republican nominee Fred R. Zeller with 62.29% of the vote.

Ribicoff's margin of victory also allowed Democrats to take control of the malapportioned House of Representatives for the first time since 1876.

== General election ==
=== Candidates ===
Major party candidates

- Abraham Ribicoff, Democratic
- Fred R. Zeller, Republican

Other candidates

- Jasper McLevy, Socialist

=== Results ===
1958 Connecticut gubernatorial election
Party	Candidate	Votes	%
Democratic	Abraham Ribicoff (incumbent)	607,012	62.29%
Republican	Fred R. Zeller	360,644	37.01%
Socialist	Jasper McLevy	6,853	0.70%
Total votes		974,509	100.00%
Democratic hold			
