= Nathan Agostinelli =

American politician (1930–2024)

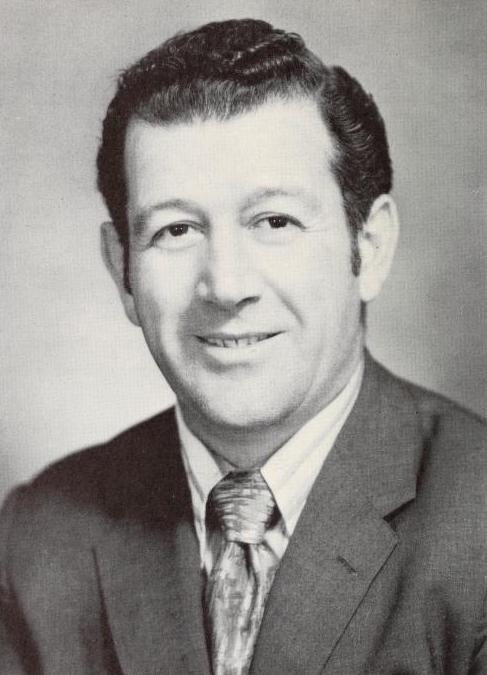
- Agostinelli in 1972

Connecticut State Comptroller
- In office 1971–1975
- Governor: Thomas Meskill
- Preceded by: Louis I. Gladstone
- Succeeded by: J. Edward Caldwell

Mayor of Manchester, Connecticut
- In office 1966–1971

Personal details
- Born: August 17, 1930 Rockville, Connecticut, U.S.
- Died: March 20, 2024 (aged 93)
- Party: Republican
- Occupation: Politician, soldier, civic leader

Nathan George Agostinelli (August 17, 1930 – March 20, 2024) was an American politician, army officer, and civic leader who served as mayor of Manchester, Connecticut (1966–1971) and as Connecticut State Comptroller (1971–1975). He ran for Lieutenant Governor of Connecticut on the ticket of Republican gubernatorial nominee Robert H. Steele but lost the 1974 Connecticut gubernatorial election to the Democratic ticket of Ella Grasso and her running mate, Robert K. Killian.

== Life and career ==
A Republican and son of Italian immigrants, Agostinelli was the only person from Manchester who had been elected to statewide office. He attended Manchester High School, the University of Hartford, and the University of Connecticut.

Agostinelli ran a Manchester restaurant before being elected and while serving as mayor. A Korean War veteran, he retired from the Connecticut Army National Guard in 1983 at the rank of brigadier general after 23 years of service. He was president of Manchester State Bank from 1974 to 1996, chair of the Capitol Region Council of Governments from 1969 to 1971, and state director of the Selective Service System under President Bill Clinton. In the 1970 election for State Comptroller, he defeated Democratic nominee Julius Kremski of New Britain by 536,875 votes to 521,178 votes—a margin of about 3%. He opted not to seek reelection in order to run for lieutenant governor. He left politics after losing the 1974 general election.

Agostinelli received more than 20 service awards, including a Presidential Commendation and the Outstanding Civilian Service Medal. The Town of Manchester named the Nate Agostinelli Veterans Memorial Park in his honor in 2021.

== Flag controversy ==
On October 12, 1970, President Richard Nixon visited Hartford and spoke at the Hilton hotel. A group of antiwar demonstrators gathered across the street at Bushnell Park to protest his visit. Agostinelli, who was attending the event, suddenly rushed at the protestors, snatched a Viet Cong flag displayed by one of them, hurled the flag onto the pavement, and stomped on it while television cameras rolled and police attempted to break up the scuffle. Later that afternoon, police arrested 12 protestors between the ages of 16 and 24 on assorted misdemeanor charges (a thirteenth protestor had been arrested earlier in the day). Edgar B. Huertas, 18, and William. T. O'Brien, 23, were charged with displaying a red flag in contravention of a state statute. The charges against the protestors were soon dropped. Agostinelli was never arrested or charged.

Before President Nixon left Hartford, he met privately with Agostinelli to shake his hand and praise his action. On October 17, Agostinelli received a Presidential Commendation from Nixon. The commendation certificate did not mention the flag-stomping incident, stating that the commendation was awarded "in recognition of exception services to others, in the finest American tradition". However, Nixon's letter accompanying the commendation praised Agostinelli for his "courageous action" and "forthright, strong-hearted gesture" in ripping the flag away from the protestors. Agostinelli was serving as a major in the Connecticut Army National Guard and was campaigning for State Comptroller at the time of the incident.

The American Civil Liberties Union condemned Agostinelli's actions as showing "a total disregard for the law". Agostinelli reportedly received hundreds of phone calls and telegrams praising his actions, including a message from the mayor of Minneapolis. He went on to win the general election for State Comptroller.

In May 1971, a federal circuit court struck down as unconstitutional a Connecticut state statute making it a criminal offense to "carry or display a red flag or any other emblem as a symbol calculated to [. . .] incite people to disorders or breaches of law". Agostinelli responded by suggesting that the judges in the case should undergo a psychiatric examination. He quickly apologized for the comment. He never apologized for the flag-stomping incident but acknowledged in a 1988 interview that his reaction was "emotional" and impulsive. He described the Vietnam War as a "disaster" in hindsight and commented that "the leadership, the president [Nixon], fooled me".

== Death ==
Agostinelli died on March 20, 2024 at the age of 93.

Party political offices
Preceded by Thomas C. Mayers, Sr.	Republican Party nominee for Connecticut Comptroller; 1970	Succeeded by Michael Kenney
Preceded by T. Clark Hull	Republican nominee for Lieutenant Governor of Connecticut; 1974	Succeeded by Lewis Rome
Political offices
Preceded by Louis I. Gladstone	Comptroller of Connecticut; 1971–1975	Succeeded by J. Edward Caldwell
