= Alf Catlin =

Australian rules footballer

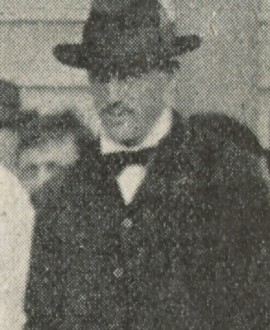
- Catlin in 1899

Personal information
- Full name: Alfred Ernest Catlin
- Born: 18 August 1875; Collingwood, Victoria
- Died: 13 September 1944 (aged 69); Richmond, Victoria
- Original team: Maryborough
- Height: 173 cm (5 ft 8 in)
- Weight: 72 kg (159 lb)

Playing career^{1}
Years	Club	Games (Goals)
1899	Collingwood	9 (4)
- ^{1} Playing statistics correct to the end of 1899.

Alfred Ernest Catlin (18 August 1875 – 13 September 1944) was an Australian rules footballer who played for the Collingwood Football Club in the Victorian Football League (VFL).
