= John M. Dowe =

American politician (1896–1946)

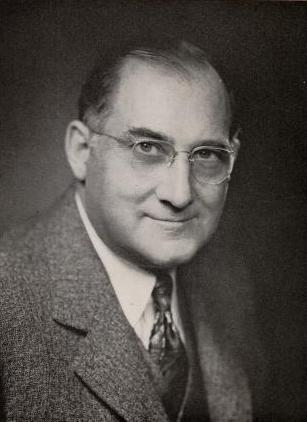

Comptroller of Connecticut
- In office January 3, 1945 – May 15, 1946
- Governor: Raymond E. Baldwin
- Preceded by: Fred R. Zeller
- Succeeded by: Raymond S. Thatcher
- In office 1941–1943
- Governor: Robert A. Hurley
- Preceded by: Fred R. Zeller
- Succeeded by: Fred R. Zeller

Chairman of the Connecticut Democratic Party
- In office December 10, 1942 – August 11, 1944
- Preceded by: John T. McCarthy
- Succeeded by: Adrian W. Maher

Personal details
- Born: John Marshall Dowe; September 1, 1896 Killingly, Connecticut, US
- Died: May 15, 1946 (aged 49) Hartford, Connecticut, US
- Party: Democratic
- Education: Brown University
- Occupation: Politician

John Marshall Dowe (September 1, 1896 – May 15, 1946) was an American politician who served as Connecticut State Comptroller (1941–1943, 1945–1946). A Democrat from Killingly, he also served in the Connecticut General Assembly.

== Political career ==
Dowe served in the Connecticut General Assembly in 1931 and 1933 and as deputy state comptroller from 1935 to 1939. A former chair of the Democratic State Central Committee, Dowe was the Democratic nominee for Connecticut's 2nd congressional district in 1934; he narrowly lost the election to Republican incumbent William L. Higgins.

Dowe was elected to the office of Connecticut State Comptroller in 1940, was defeated in 1942, and won again in 1944. When he died in office in 1946, the Connecticut General Assembly appointed Raymond S. Thatcher to fill the vacancy.

== Personal life ==
Dowe was born on September 1, 1896, and was raised in Killingly, Connecticut. Dowe attended the town's public schools as well as Brown University. In 1917, he left Brown without a degree to enlist in the United States Army and saw active duty overseas in World War I with the 103rd Field Artillery Regiment, 26th Infantry Division, American Expeditionary Force.

Returning to Killingly in May 1919, Dowe took over the running of the family stationery business, which his grandfather had established in 1860. He dedicated ten years to running the business before entering public service in the 1930s. He had two sons, Marshall and David, with his first wife, Muriel Clark, who died in 1934. Dowe later married Doris Perry of Danvers, Massachusetts.

At the age of 49, Dowe suffered a heart attack and died at Saint Francis Hospital in Hartford on May 15, 1946. Doris Dowe died by suicide on October 22, 1946. She had been in poor health and been "despondent" at her husband's death.
