= George Catlin (musical instrument maker) =

George Catlin (1778-1852) was an American maker of musical instruments. He worked in Hartford, Connecticut from 1799 or earlier until about 1814, when he moved to Philadelphia, Pennsylvania. According to his advertisements in Connecticut newspapers he made pianofortes, harpsichords, violoncellos, guitars, bassoons, clarinets, "hautboys" (oboes), flutes, and fifes.

Catlin designed and manufactured an instrument of his own devising called a "patent clarion." This was a bassoon-shaped bass clarinet, similar to but apparently designed independently of similar instruments developed starting in the late 18th century in Western Europe. Catlin appears to have been one of the first successful manufacturers of bass clarinets in the world. An alto clarinet, unsigned but of similar design to Catlin's bass clarinets and very probably by him or by one of his students, has survived; made circa 1820, it is one of the first known examples of the instrument.
