= Fred R. Zeller =

American politician (1899–1978)

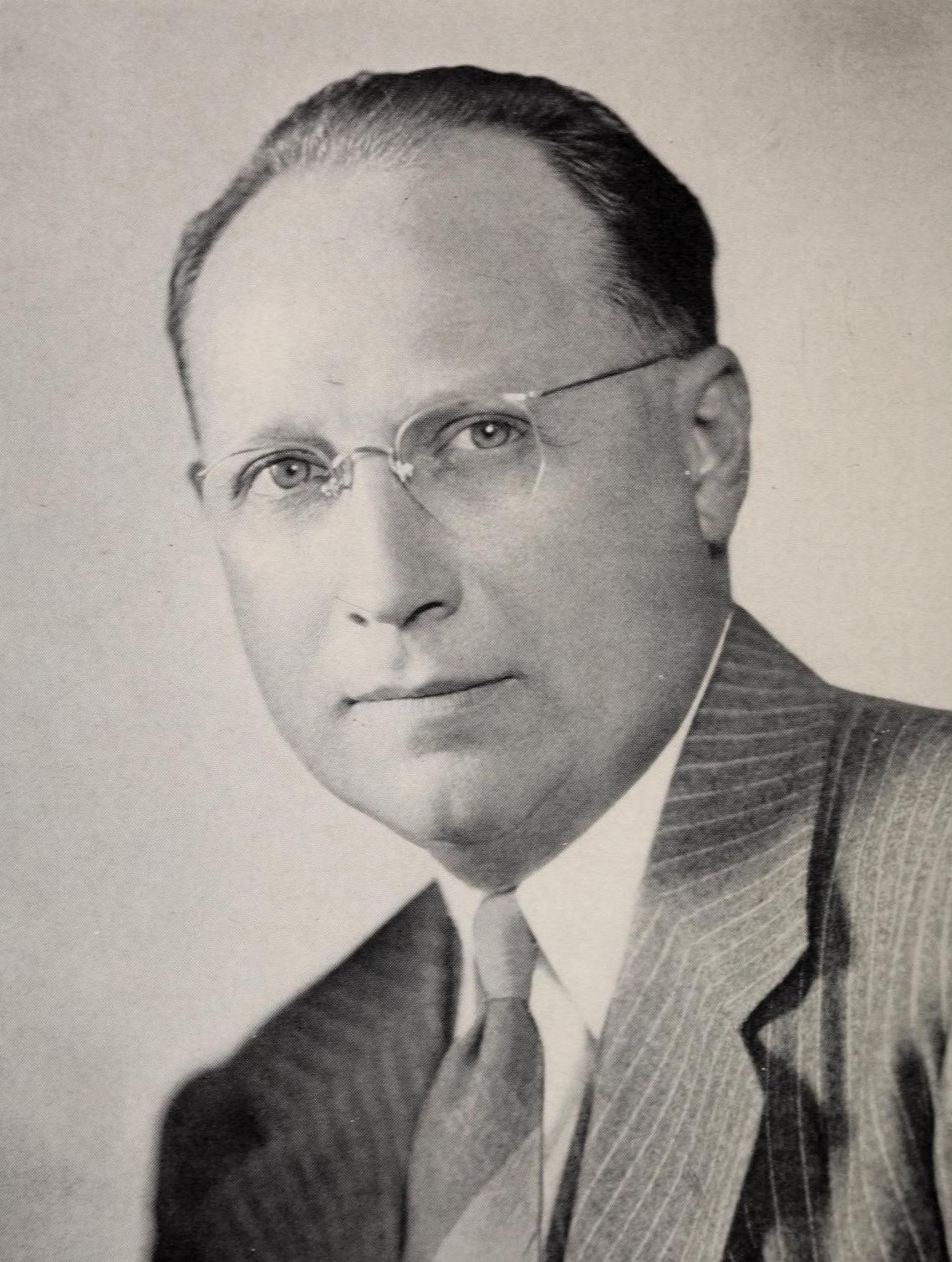
- Zeller in 1948

Comptroller of Connecticut
- In office 1951–1959
- Governor: John Davis Lodge; Abraham Ribicoff
- Preceded by: Raymond S. Thatcher
- Succeeded by: Raymond S. Thatcher
- In office 1947–1949
- Governor: James L. McConaughy; James C. Shannon
- Preceded by: Raymond S. Thatcher
- Succeeded by: Raymond S. Thatcher
- In office 1943–1945
- Governor: Raymond E. Baldwin
- Preceded by: John M. Dowe
- Succeeded by: John M. Dowe
- In office 1939–1941
- Governor: Raymond E. Baldwin
- Preceded by: Charles C. Swartz
- Succeeded by: John M. Dowe

Personal details
- Born: September 5, 1899 Stonington, Connecticut, US
- Died: March 7, 1978 (aged 78) Providence, Rhode Island, US
- Party: Republican
- Occupation: Politician, businessman

Fred Richard Zeller (September 5, 1899 – March 7, 1978) was an American politician, businessman, and white-collar criminal who served as Connecticut State Comptroller for 14 years between 1939 and 1959.

== Political career ==
Zeller served 14 years as Connecticut State Comptroller between 1939 and 1959. A Republican, he ran for governor in 1958 but lost to Democratic incumbent Abraham Ribicoff, who garnered 62% of the vote to Zeller's 37%. After serving on the Stonington Board of Education, Zeller had served as a member of the Connecticut State Senate from 1936 to 1938.

== Conviction ==
In 1966, Zeller pleaded guilty to having embezzled $26,297 from the First Baptist Church of Stonington, Connecticut, where he had served as church treasurer for many years. He was sentenced to 1–3 years in prison and served nine months.

== Personal life ==
The son of a German immigrant, Zeller was born in Stonington, where he lived his entire life other than short sojourns in West Hartford and Seekonk, Massachusetts, while in his 70s. He attended Stonington's public schools and worked as secretary and treasurer for a Bridgeport-based manufacturer and as president of a New York-based manufacturer. Zeller died at Providence Hospital in Rhode Island at the age of 78. He was survived by his wife, Marjorie Mackenzie Zeller, and two daughters.

Party political offices
Preceded by John Davis Lodge	Republican nominee for Governor of Connecticut (1958)	Succeeded by John deKoven Alsop
