= Connecticut State Comptroller =

U.S. state office position

State Comptroller of Connecticut
- Seal of the State Comptroller

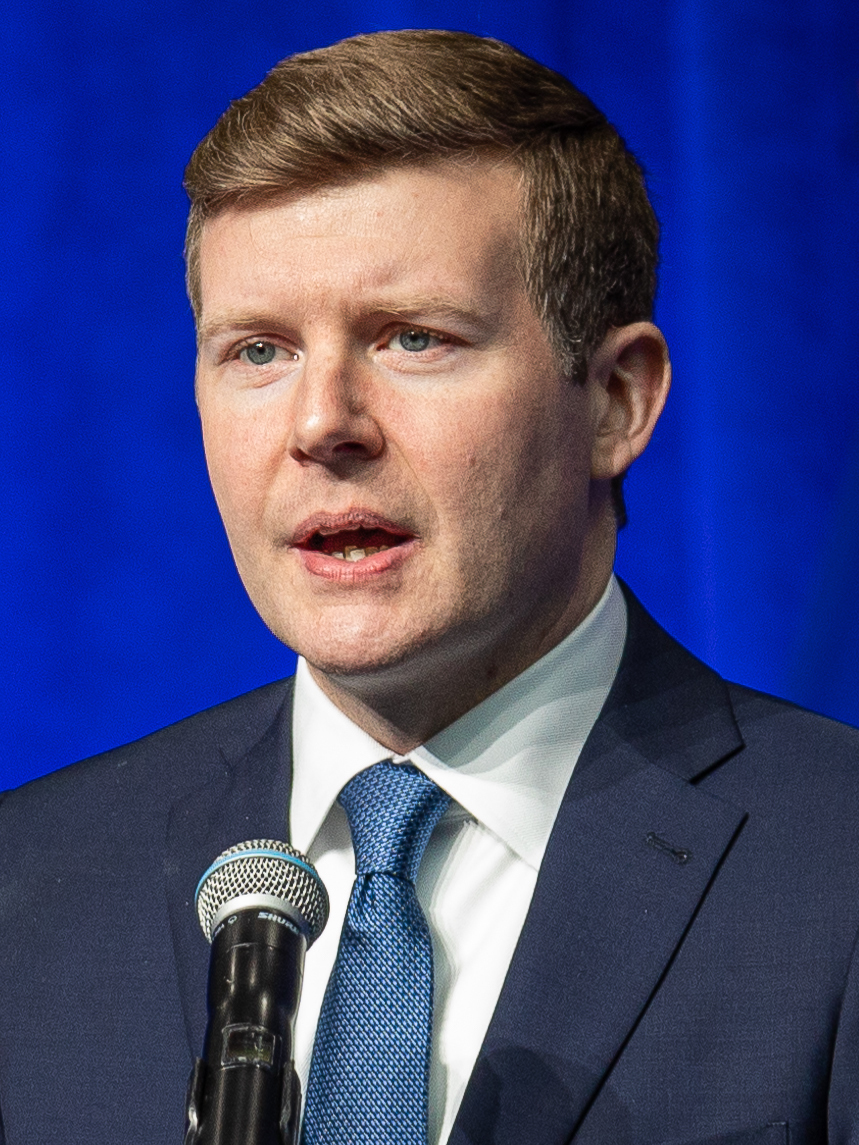
- Incumbent; Sean Scanlon since January 4, 2023
- Formation: 1786
- First holder: James Wadsworth
- Website: osc.ct.gov

The state comptroller is the chief fiscal guardian of the State of Connecticut. The duties and responsibilities of the state comptroller include, among other things, overseeing state accounting, preparing state financial reports, paying and administering benefits to state employees, settling demands against the state that do not first have to be approved or adjusted by the General Assembly, administering miscellaneous appropriations for employee taxes, insurance, and health services, and administering grants to police, firefighters, and municipalities.

Comptrollers in Connecticut are elected to a term of four years, their election taking place in the same cycle as gubernatorial elections.

Nancy Wyman became the first woman elected state comptroller in 1994. Natalie Braswell became the first African-American state comptroller in 2021.

The current state comptroller is Sean Scanlon, a Democrat who has served since January 4, 2023.

== List of comptrollers ==
A Connecticut Democratic Federalist Democratic-Republican National Republican Free Soil Republican Whig

Image	Name	Town	Political Party	Term of Office
	James Wadsworth	Durham	Independent	1786–1788
	Oliver Wolcott	Litchfield		1788–1790
	Ralph Pomeroy	Coventry		1790–1791
	Andrew Kingsbury	Hartford		1791–1793
	John Porter	Lebanon		1793–1806
	Elisha Colt	Hartford		1806–1819
	James Thomas	Hartford		1819–1830
	Elisha Phelps	Simsbury		1830–1834
	Roger Huntington	Norwich		1834–1835
	Gideon Welles	Hartford	Democratic	1835–1836
	William Field	Pomfret		1836–1838
	Henry Kilbourn	Hartford		1838–1842
	Gideon Welles	Hartford	Democratic	1842–1844
	Abijah Carrington	New Haven		1844–1846
	Mason Cleveland	Hampton		1846–1847
	Abijah Catlin	Harwinton		1847–1850
	Rufus G. Pinney	Stafford	Democratic	1850–1854
	John Dunham	Norwich	Whig	1854–1855
	Alexander Merrell	New London	American	1855–1856
	Edward Prentis	New London	American	1856–1857
	Joseph G. Lamb	Norwich	American, Republican	1857–1858
	William H. Buell	Clinton	Republican	1858–1861
	Leman W. Cutler	Watertown	Republican	1861–1866
	Robbins Battell	Norfolk	Union	1866–1867
	Jesse Olney	Stratford	Democratic	1867–1869
	James W. Manning	Putnam	Republican	1869–1870
	Seth S. Logan	Washington	Democratic	1870–1871
	James W. Manning	Putnam	Republican	1871–1873
	Alfred R. Goodrich	Vernon	Democratic	1873–1877
	Charles C. Hubbard	Middletown	Democratic	1877–1879
	Chauncey Howard	Coventry	Republican	1879–1881
	Wheelock Batcheller	Winsted	Republican	1881–1883
	Frank D. Sloat	New Haven	Republican	1883–1885
	Luzerne I. Munson	Waterbury	Republican	1885–1887
	Thomas Clark	North Stonington	Republican	1887–1889
	John B. Wright	Clinton	Republican	1889–1891
	Nicholas Staub	New Milford	Democratic	1891–1895
	Benjamin P. Mead	New Canaan	Republican	1895–1899
	Thompson S. Grant	Enfield	Republican	1899–1901
	Abiram Chamberlain	Meriden	Republican	1901–1903
	William E. Seeley	Bridgeport	Republican	1903–1905
	Asahel W. Mitchell	Woodbury	Republican	1905–1907
	Thomas D. Bradstreet	Thomaston	Republican	1907–1913
	Daniel P. Dunn	Windham	Democratic	1913–1915
	Morris C. Webster	Torrington	Republican	1915–1921
	Harvey P. Bissell	Ridgefield	Republican	1921–1923
	Frederick M. Salmon	Westport	Republican	1923–1933
	Anson F. Keeler	Norwalk	Republican	1933–1935
	Charles C. Swartz	Norwalk	Democratic	1935–1939
	Fred R. Zeller	Stonington	Republican	1939–1941
	John M. Dowe	Killingly	Democratic	1941–1943
	Fred R. Zeller	Stonington	Republican	1943–1945
	John M. Dowe^{1}	Killingly	Democratic	1945–1946
	Raymond S. Thatcher	East Hampton	Democratic	1946–1947
	Fred R. Zeller	Stonington	Republican	1947–1949
	Raymond S. Thatcher	East Hampton	Democratic	1949–1951
	Fred R. Zeller	Stonington	Republican	1951–1959
	Raymond S. Thatcher^{2}	East Hampton	Democratic	1959–1966
	James J. Casey^{3}	Winchester	Democratic	1966–1967
	Louis I. Gladstone	Bridgeport	Democratic	1967–1971
	Nathan G. Agostinelli	Manchester	Republican	1971–1975
	J. Edward Caldwell	Bridgeport	Democratic	1975–1991
	William E. Curry, Jr.	Farmington	Democratic	1991–1995
	Nancy S. Wyman	Tolland	Democratic	1995–2011
	Kevin P. Lembo^{4}	Guilford	Democratic	2011–2021
	Natalie Braswell^{5}	Bloomfield	Democratic	2021–2023
	Sean Scanlon	Guilford	Democratic	2023–present

Town listed is town of residence at time of election.

- ^{1} Died in office May 15, 1946, and Raymond S. Thatcher was appointed by the General Assembly to fill the vacancy.
- ^{2} Resigned July 19, 1966, to become a member of the Public Utilities Commission.
- ^{3} Appointed by governor July 19, 1966, to fill the unexpired term of Raymond S. Thatcher.
- ^{4} Resigned December 31, 2021, due to ill health.
- ^{5} Appointed by governor December 31, 2021, to fill the unexpired term of Kevin Lembo.
