= Sid Catlin =

Australian rules footballer

Personal information
- Full name: Sid Catlin
- Born: 24 December 1949 (age 76)
- Original team: Paramount
- Height: 171 cm (5 ft 7 in)
- Weight: 69 kg (152 lb)
- Position: Rover

Playing career^{1}
Years	Club	Games (Goals)
1966, 1968	Melbourne	4 (1)
1969–70	South Melbourne	15 (14)
Total		19 (15)
- ^{1} Playing statistics correct to the end of 1970.

Sid Catlin (born 24 December 1949) is a former Australian rules footballer who played with Melbourne and South Melbourne in the Victorian Football League (VFL).
