= James J. Casey =

American politician and civil servant

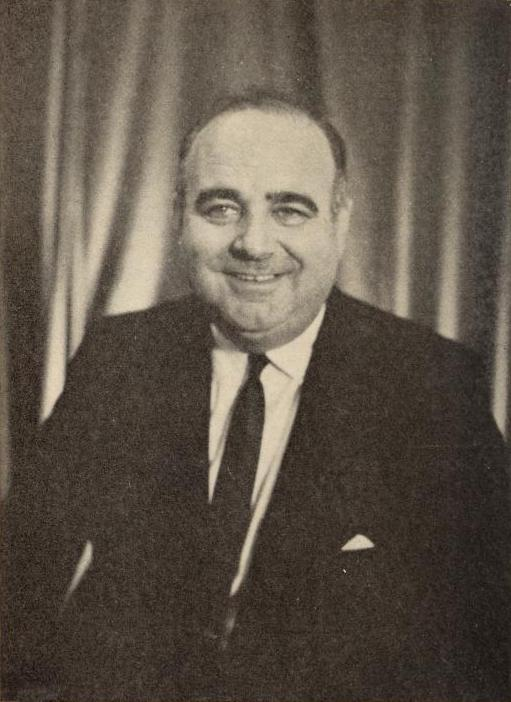

Connecticut State Comptroller
- In office July 19, 1966 – January 1967
- Governor: John N. Dempsey
- Preceded by: Raymond S. Thatcher
- Succeeded by: Louis I. Gladstone

Mayor of Winsted, Connecticut
- In office 1957–1961

Personal details
- Born: September 6, 1926 Winchester, Connecticut, US
- Died: July 12, 1989 (aged 62) Rocky Hill, Connecticut, US
- Party: Democratic
- Occupation: Politician, civil servant

James Justin Casey (September 6, 1926 – July 12, 1989) was an American politician and civil servant who served as Connecticut State Comptroller from July 1966 to January 1967.

== Life and career ==
Born in Winchester, Connecticut, Casey attended Housatonic Valley Regional High School and the Hartford Institute of Accounting. He was selectman (1953–1963) and mayor (1957–1961) of Winsted and deputy state comptroller until 1966. Dempsey appointed him to be commissioner of consumer protection from 1967 to 1970. He was on the Democratic State Central Committee (1954–1975).

Governor John Dempsey appointed Casey to serve as Connecticut State Comptroller on July 19, 1966, to fill the unexpired term of Raymond S. Thatcher, who had resigned to become the state's public utilities commissioner. Casey served until January 1967 and did not run for a full term.

Casey moved to coastal Connecticut circa 1969 and worked for a Hamden engineering consulting firm until his death. He and his wife, Lois Mellor Casey, had co-owned a card shop in Madison for seven years prior to his death. Casey died at the Veterans Home and Hospital in Rocky Hill after a brief illness. He had a son and five daughters with his first wife, Anne Serafini.

Political offices
| Preceded by Raymond S. Thatcher | Comptroller of Connecticut; 1966–1967 | Succeeded by Louis I. Gladstone |
