= Thomas D. Bradstreet =

American politician (1841–1915)

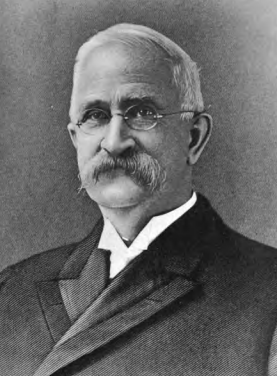

Connecticut State Comptroller
- In office 1907–1913
- Governor: Rollin S. Woodruff; George L. Lilley; Frank B. Weeks; Simeon E. Baldwin
- Preceded by: Asahel W. Mitchell
- Succeeded by: Daniel P. Dunn

Member of the Connecticut Senate
- In office 1903, 1905

Member of the Connecticut House of Representatives
- In office 1867

Personal details
- Born: Thomas Dudley Bradstreet; August 1, 1841 Thomaston, Connecticut, U.S.
- Died: August 15, 1915 (aged 74) Thomaston, Connecticut, U.S.
- Resting place: Hillside Cemetery; Thomaston, Connecticut, U.S.
- Party: Republican
- Spouse: Sarah M. Perry (m. 1864)
- Children: 1
- Education: Hudson River Institute
- Occupation: Politician; soldier; businessman; fire chief

Thomas Dudley Bradstreet (August 1, 1841 – August 15, 1915) was an American politician from Connecticut. He served in the Connecticut House of Representatives and the Connecticut Senate. He served as Connecticut State Comptroller from 1907 to 1913.

== Early life ==
Thomas Dudley Bradstreet was born on August 1, 1841, in Thomaston, Connecticut, to Thomas J. Bradstreet. He was descended from Simon Bradstreet and Governor Thomas Dudley of the Massachusetts Bay Colony. He was also descended from Seth Thomas, founder of the Seth Thomas Clock Company. Bradstreet graduated from schools in Thomaston. He attended the Hudson River Institute in Claverack, New York.

== Career ==
Bradstreet served as first sergeant of Company D of the 19th Connecticut Infantry Regiment during the Civil War. In 1873, Bradstreet began working at the Seth Thomas Clock Company in Thomaston as a bench hand. He later became foreman, secretary, manager and vice president. He was chief of the Thomaston fire department from 1882 to 1897.

Bradstreet was a Republican. He served in the Connecticut House of Representatives in 1867. He would later serve in the Connecticut Senate in 1903. He served as chairman of the labor committee and the cities and boroughs committee. He served in the senate again in 1905 and was chairman of the railroads committee and the executive nominations committee. He was Connecticut State Comptroller from 1907 to 1913. He ran for Connecticut's 5th congressional district in the U.S. House of Representatives in 1912, but lost to William Kennedy.

Bradstreet was director of the Thomaston National Bank and the Seth Thomas Clock Company. He was president of the Thomaston Water Company.

== Personal life ==
Bradstreet married Sarah M. Perry, descendant of Commodore Oliver Perry, in 1864. They had one daughter, Mrs. George A. Lemmon. He was a member of the Thomaston Congregational Church. He was also a member of the Grand Army of the Republic.

Bradstreet died on August 15, 1915, at his home in Thomaston. He was buried in Hillside Cemetery in Thomaston.
