= Catlin (medicine) =

Long, double-bladed surgical knife

A catlin or catling is a long, double-bladed surgical knife. It was commonly used from the 17th to the mid 19th century, particularly for amputations; after that its use declined in favor of mechanically driven (and later, electrically driven) oscillating saws.

Surgeon William Clowes wrote about the instrument in a medical treatise written in 1596, that amputation required the use of "a very good catlin, and an incision knife," Later, surgeon John Woodall referred to a "catlinge" in a work in 1639. By 1693, when British navy surgeon John Moyle described proper amputation techniques, he wrote that "with your Catling, divide the Flesh and Vessels about and between the bones, and with the back of your Catling, remove the Periosteum that it may not hinder the saw, nor cause greater Torment in the Operation,".

The term was thereafter understood to refer to an interosseous knife.

== See also ==
- Instruments used in general surgery
