= Raymond S. Thatcher =

American politician (1903–1988)

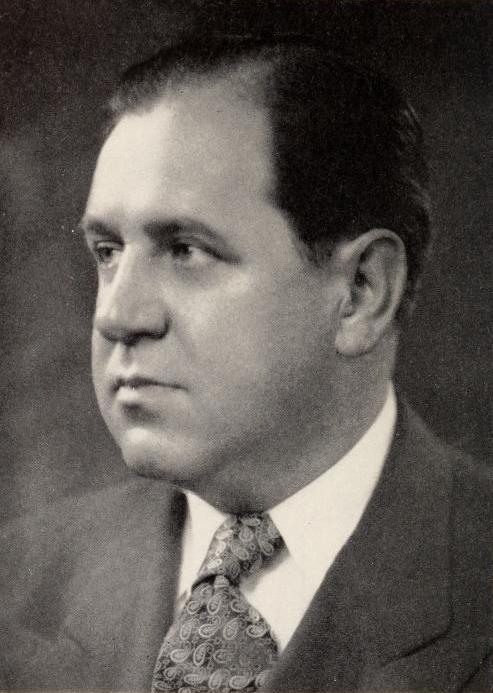
- Thatcher in 1950

Comptroller of Connecticut
- In office 1959–1966
- Governor: Abraham Ribicoff; John N. Dempsey
- Preceded by: Fred R. Zeller
- Succeeded by: James J. Casey
- In office 1949–1951
- Governor: Chester B. Bowles
- Preceded by: Fred R. Zeller
- Succeeded by: Fred R. Zeller

Personal details
- Born: January 3, 1903 Thompson, Connecticut, US
- Died: October 5, 1988 (aged 85) Middletown, Connecticut, US
- Party: Democratic
- Education: East Greenwich Academy
- Occupation: Politician, pharmacist

Raymond S. Thatcher (January 10, 1903 – October 5, 1988) was an American politician and pharmacist who served a total of six terms as Connecticut State Comptroller between 1946 and 1966. A Democrat from East Hampton, Thatcher also served in the Connecticut House of Representatives and as a public utilities commissioner during his 40-year-long political career.

== Early life and career ==
Thatcher was born in Thompson, Connecticut, to Methodist minister Samuel Thatcher and Amelia (Fear) Thatcher. The family lived in Sterling and Pascoag before settling in Jewett City in 1917. He attended public schools in Jewett City and Middletown High School and graduated from East Greenwich Academy in 1922. He opened a pharmacy in East Hampton in 1929.

Thatcher began his political career in town politics. He served as East Hampton's Democratic town committee chair from 1934 to 1955 and also served on the Democratic State Central Committee during the 1940s. He served as East Hampton's elected town treasurer from 1934 to 1936. He joined the East Hampton Board of Finance in 1947, serving until 1953.

Thatcher represented East Hampton in the Connecticut House of Representatives in the 1941 and 1943 legislative sessions. He was a member of the House's appropriations committee, finance advisory committee, and legislative council.

Thatcher worked as deputy state comptroller from 1941 to 1943 and again from 1945 to 1946.

== Career as comptroller ==
In May 1946, Comptroller John M. Dowe died unexpectedly, and the Connecticut General Assembly appointed Thatcher to fill the vacancy effective May 20, 1946. He ran for a full term but lost the election to Republican nominee Fred R. Zeller and exited office in January 1947. He defeated Zeller in a rematch in 1948 and served one full term as comptroller from 1949 to 1951.

Between Thatcher's terms as comptroller, Governor Abraham Ribicoff appointed him to serve on the Connecticut Public Utilities Commission in 1955 and to serve as a state auditor in 1956. Thatcher returned to politics to win four consecutive elections as comptroller, serving from 1959 to 1966. He was also a delegate to the Connecticut Constitutional Convention in 1965.

He resigned as comptroller on July 19, 1966, to resume his service as public utilities commissioner. Governor John Dempsey appointed James J. Casey, a Democrat and former mayor of Winchester, to fill the remaining six months of Thatcher's term. Thatcher retired in 1975 when the public utilities commission was replaced by the Public Utilities Control Authority.

== Personal life ==
Thatcher married Beatrice Howard of Deep River in 1931. The couple had one daughter, Carole E. Thatcher.

Thatcher died at Middlesex Hospital in Middletown on October 5, 1988. His wife had died in 1977.
