= J. Edward Caldwell =

American politician (1927–2013)

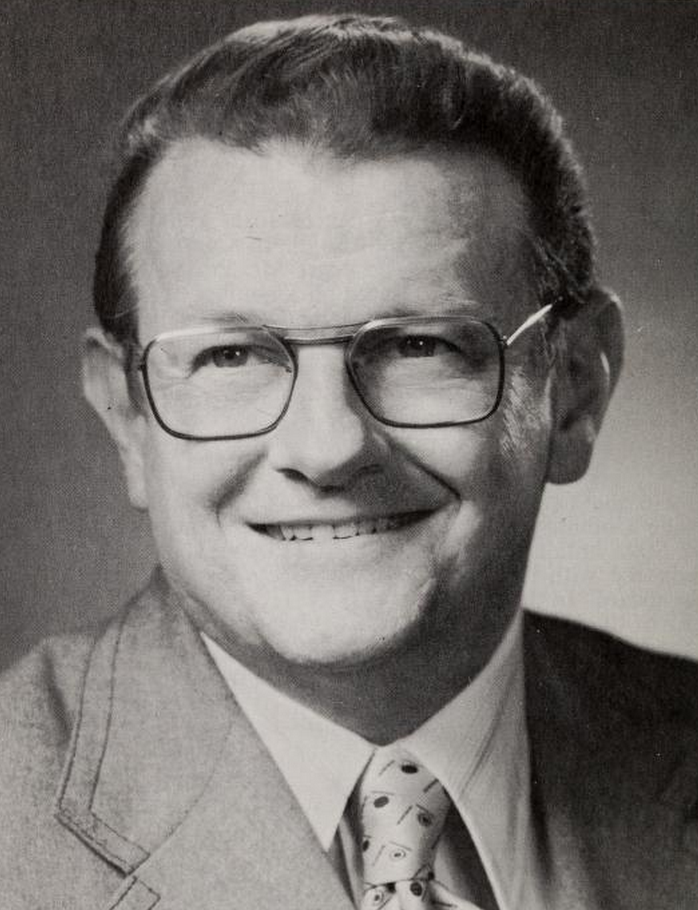

Comptroller of Connecticut
- In office 1974–1991
- Governor: Thomas Meskill; Ella T. Grasso; William O'Neill
- Preceded by: Nathan G. Agostinelli
- Succeeded by: Bill Curry

Member of the Connecticut Senate from the 23rd district
- In office 1958–1974

Personal details
- Born: June 13, 1927 Bridgeport, Connecticut, U.S.
- Died: October 9, 2013 (aged 86) Stratford, Connecticut, U.S.
- Party: Democratic
- Spouse: Eileen Young
- Education: Fairfield University; University of Connecticut Law School
- Occupation: Attorney

James Edward Caldwell (June 13, 1927 – October 9, 2013) was an American politician from the state of Connecticut. He served in the Connecticut State Senate from 1958 to 1974, and as Connecticut State Comptroller from 1974 to 1991, the longest term of any comptroller in the state's history.

Caldwell was a veteran of World War II and an alumnus of Fairfield University and the University of Connecticut Law School.

Named "Man of the Year" in 1967 by his alma mater, Fairfield University, he was a member of the St Charles Holy Name Society, the Ancient Order of Hibernians, the Knights of Columbus, the American Legion, and Fairfield Prep Latin Scholars. He was a founding members of the Fairfield University Glee Club and sang tenor in church choirs and barbershop quartets.

Party political offices
Preceded by Julius J. Kremski	Democratic nominee for Connecticut State Comptroller; 1974, 1978, 1982, 1986	Succeeded by Bill Curry
Political offices
Preceded by Nathan G. Agostinelli	Comptroller of Connecticut; 1975–1991	Succeeded by William E. Curry, Jr.
