= Abijah Catlin =

American politician (1805–1891)

Abijah Catlin (April 1, 1805 – April 14, 1891) was an American politician.

Abijah Catlin, elder son of Abijah Catlin, Jr., and Orinda (Williams) Catlin, was born in Harwinton, Connecticut, on April 1, 1805.

He graduated from Yale College in 1825. He studied law at the Yale Law School, and was admitted to the Litchfield County bar, but soon removed to Greensboro, Ga., where he practiced for about five years. He then returned to Harwinton, and followed his profession there. In 1837 he was elected by the Whig party to the Connecticut House of Representatives, and was re-elected for the next two years. In 1844 he was a member of the Connecticut State Senate, and was one of the ex-officio Fellows of Yale College. From 1847 to 1850 he held the office of Connecticut State Comptroller. In 1850 and 1851 he was again in the House, and in 1857 was Commissioner of the School Fund. At the outbreak of the American Civil War, in 1861, he was again sent to the Legislature, and served for two years, as well as in 1865, 1874, and 1879. He was judge of probate for some fourteen years between 1838 and his retirement on account of age in 1875; he was also judge of the County Court in 1844 and 1845.

He was twice married : first to Mary Simonton of Georgia; and secondly to Mary, daughter of Dr. Andrew Abernethy, of Harwinton. He died in Harwinton, on April 14, 1891, at the age of 86.

This article incorporates public domain material from the 1891 Yale Obituary Record.

Political offices
Preceded by Mason Cleveland	Comptroller of Connecticut; 1847–1850	Succeeded by Rufus G. Pinney
