= 2025 Stamford mayoral election =

- November 4, 2025
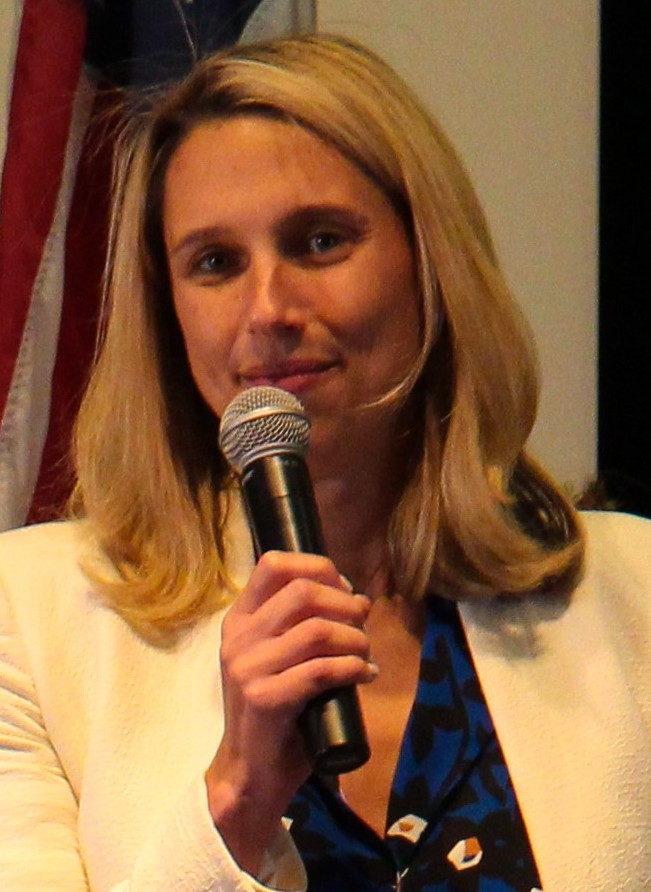

Candidate	Caroline Simmons	Nicola Tarzia
Party	Democratic	Republican
Popular vote	16,506	7,874
Percentage	65.54%	31.26%
Mayor before election
Caroline Simmons
Democratic
Elected mayor
Caroline Simmons
Democratic

The 2025 Stamford mayoral election took place on November 4, 2025. Incumbent mayor Caroline Simmons won in a decisive landslide, defeating Republican challenger Nicola Tarzia by more than 34 percentage points.

== Background ==
Stamford, Connecticut experienced significant population growth and economic development since the 1990s, in contrast to most other cities in Connecticut during this time. Since its growth, Stamford has played a major role in the state's economy, with one 2022 article in the Stamford Advocate calling it "the economic engine of the state".

In the city's 2021 mayoral election, Caroline Simmons defeated incumbent mayor David Martin in a Democratic primary and went on to defeat former Major League Baseball manager Bobby Valentine. During Simmons' term, she came into conflict with a faction of Stamford's Democratic Party known as "Reform Stamford", who argued special interests such as real estate developers and construction companies had outsized influence on city government. This faction suffered numerous political defeats throughout Simmons' term, losing efforts to re-write the city's charter in 2023, and significant losses in the 2024 Democratic City Committee elections.

Every challenger to Simmons' second term claimed the city had too much development.

== Candidates ==
=== Democratic Party ===
==== Nominee ====
- Caroline Simmons, incumbent mayor

==== Declared write-in ====
- Fritz Chery, former Stamford Board of Education member

==== Failed to qualify ====
- Michael Loughran Jr., retired police sergeant

=== Republican Party ===
==== Nominee ====
- Nicola Tarzia, former member of the Stamford Board of Education

==== Failed to qualify ====
- Arthur Augustyn, former staffer of former mayor David Martin
- Peter Slavin

=== Independent Party ===
==== Nominee ====
- Caroline Simmons, incumbent mayor

== General election ==
=== Endorsements ===
Caroline Simmons

Party chapters

- Stamford Democratic City Committee

Political parties

- Independent Party of Connecticut
Nicola Tarzia

Party chapters

- Stamford Republican Town Committee

=== Results ===
General election results
Party	Candidate	Votes	%
Democratic	Caroline Simmons	16,506	65.54%
Republican	Nicola Tarzia	7,874	31.26%
Write-in	Fritz Chery	556	2.21%
Write-in	Michael Loughran	235	0.93%
Write-in	David Cherniack	14	0.06%
Total votes		25,185	100%
