= Caroline Simmons =

American politician (born 1986)

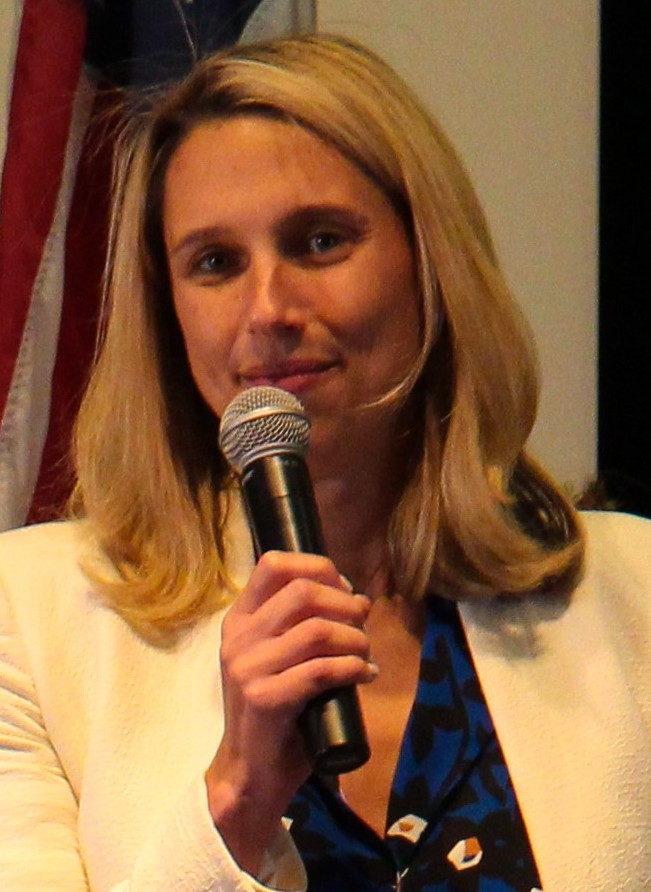
- Simmons in 2021

32nd Mayor of Stamford
- Incumbent
- Assumed office December 1, 2021
- Preceded by: David Martin

Member of the Connecticut House of Representatives from the 144th District
- In office January 7, 2015 – December 1, 2021
- Preceded by: Michael Molgano
- Succeeded by: Hubert Douglas Delany

Personal details
- Born: February 10, 1986 (age 40) Greenwich, Connecticut, U.S.
- Party: Democratic
- Spouse: Art Linares (m. 2017)
- Relations: Nick Simmons (brother)
- Children: 3
- Education: Harvard University (BA); George Washington University (MA)

Caroline B. Simmons (born February 10, 1986) is an American politician serving as the mayor of Stamford, Connecticut. A member of the Democratic Party, she previously served as state representative for Connecticut's 144th District, where she was the youngest female legislator in Connecticut state office. She is married to former State Senator Art Linares, a Republican. Simmons won the 2021 Stamford mayoral election, becoming the city's first female mayor. She won reelection in 2025 in a landslide.

== Early life and education ==
Simmons was born February 10, 1986 in Greenwich, Connecticut, one of five children, to Steven J. Simmons (born 1946), a graduate of Cornell University and Harvard Law School, a former professor at University of California, Irvine, and a cable entrepreneur turned contemporary artist, and Mary "Eileen" Simmons (née Haggerty; born 1949). Her father, who is originally from Long Island, is being described as moderate Republican and her mother as moderate Democrat. Her father was heavily involved in Democrat politics during and after college, having supported (and met) Robert F. Kennedy and Hubert Humphrey in 1968. After law school he went to work in the Carter White House in the late 1970s. After Carter's loss in 1980 he went into the cable business and eventually founded his own company, Simmons Communications, that became the initial source of his family's wealth. In 1992, her father lobbied President George H. W. Bush in the hope of avoiding cable regulation, and in 1994 he began selling all the properties he had accumulated resulting in him being able to spend more time with his young family. Subsequently her father founded Patriot Media, which was sold to Comcast for $482 million in 2007, one of the highest per subscriber sales prices for a cable system sale up to that point. Her younger brother is Nick Simmons.

She was the president of her high school Greenwich Academy, captain of three varsity sports and a two-time All-American lacrosse player. She earned her bachelor's degree from Harvard College in 2008, where she majored in Government. While in college, Simmons played on the varsity lacrosse team and spent a semester studying abroad at the American University in Egypt.

== Professional career ==
After graduating Harvard she worked on Barack Obama's Presidential Transition Team, before accepting a job at the Department of Homeland Security. At the Department of Homeland Security, Simmons served as Director of Special Projects in the Counterterrorism Coordinator's Office and traveled to Kabul many times for her work. Simmons also earned a Master of Arts degree in Middle East Studies from the Elliott School of International Affairs at George Washington University in 2011.

== Connecticut General Assembly ==
=== Elections ===
In 2014, Simmons became a state representative candidate for the 144th district. Simmons defeated incumbent Republican Michael Molgano with 53.8% of the vote, and was the only Connecticut Democrat in 2014 to defeat an incumbent Republican. In 2016, Simmons won re-election, defeating her challenger with 67% of the vote. In 2018 and 2020, Simmons won re-election, while pregnant during both elections.

=== Tenure ===
In her first term, Simmons Introduced or co-sponsored 53 bi-partisan bills, two which reduced regulations for small businesses and six of which lowered taxes on hospitals, businesses, and residents. She also secured $65 million in funding for schools, passed legislation improving public safety, gun safety, and pedestrian safety, and co-sponsored legislation for a Connecticut Competitiveness Council. Simmons introduced and led debate on a bill to enhance the state's cyber security. During her second term, Simmons continued advocating for improvements to Stamford public schools, infrastructure, and public safety. She was appointed as Chair of the Commerce Committee, becoming one of the youngest women to ever do so. As chair, she has focused on small business development and job growth, especially given the COVID-19 pandemic.

== Mayor of Stamford (2021–present) ==
=== 2021 election ===
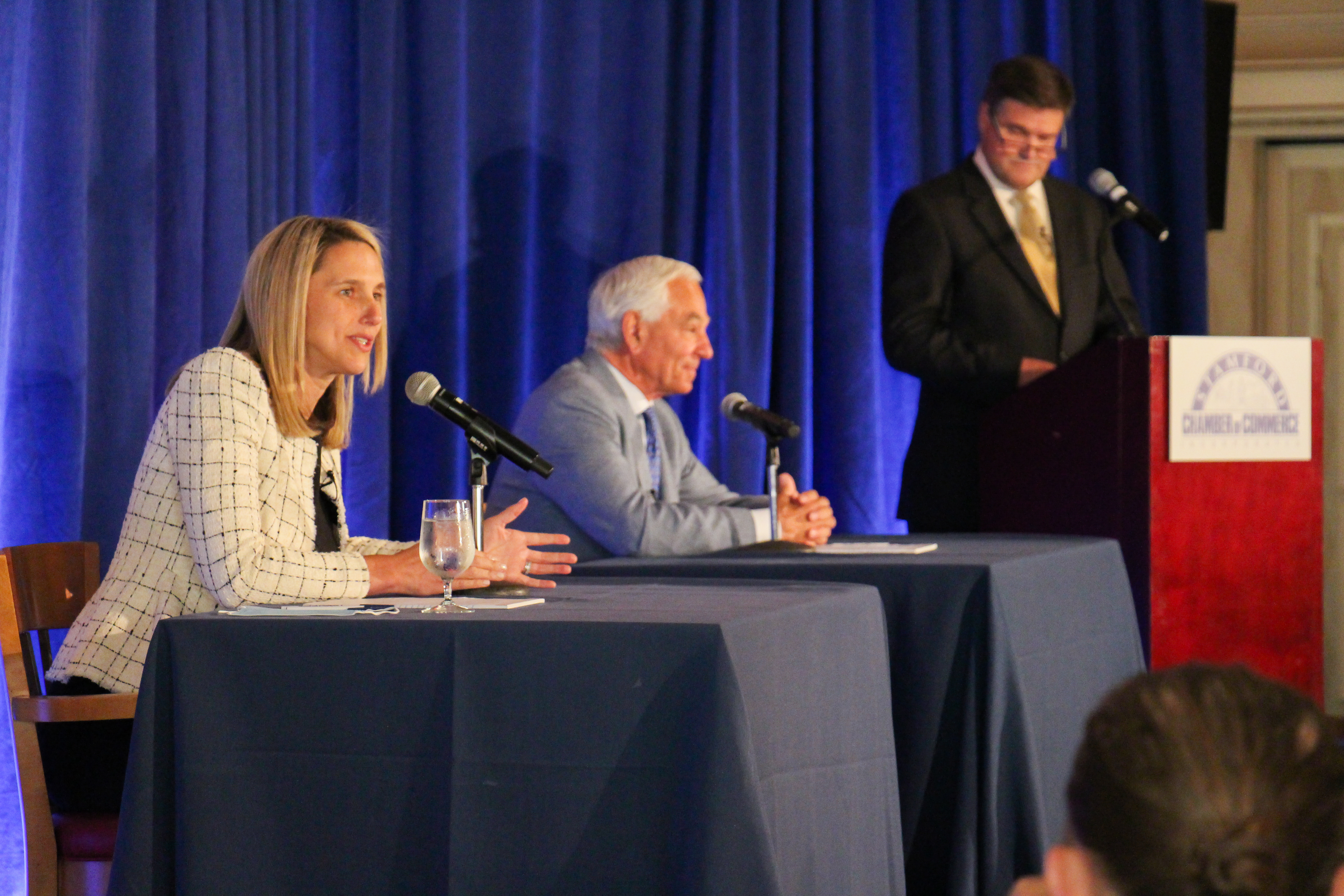
Simmons debates Valentine for the televised debate hosted at Giovanni's in Darien.

On February 10, 2021, Simmons declared her run for mayor of Stamford, Connecticut in the 2021 Stamford mayoral election. Simmons was endorsed by the Stamford Democratic City Committee against two-term incumbent Mayor David Martin. Simmons was also endorsed by the Independent Party of Connecticut. Martin collected enough signatures to force a Democratic primary election which took place on September 14, 2021. Simmons defeated Martin in a landslide, winning the majority of votes in every voting district. Simmons had raised over $239,000 for her primary campaign, outpacing Martin's $78,000.

Simmons faced unaffiliated candidate Bobby Valentine in the general election. The Republican-endorsed candidate dropped out prior to the Democratic primary and endorsed Valentine. The race attracted several high-profile donors, amounting to a total of $1.2M between both candidates. Simmons garnered national attention after she announced she was expecting her third child, and again when she was endorsed by President Barack Obama. The race was characterized as "tense" with Simmons claiming Valentine had used misogynistic language and Valentine claiming Simmons was ageist.

Initial results on election night indicated a close race, but absentee ballots swung heavily in Simmons' favor resulting in a 5-point victory. Valentine originally claimed duplicate ballots may have influenced the result, but conceded soon afterward. Valentine did not contact Simmons on election night, and characterized local press coverage as "lousy", adding he could not compliment Simmons' victory "with an open heart and clear mind."

=== Tenure ===
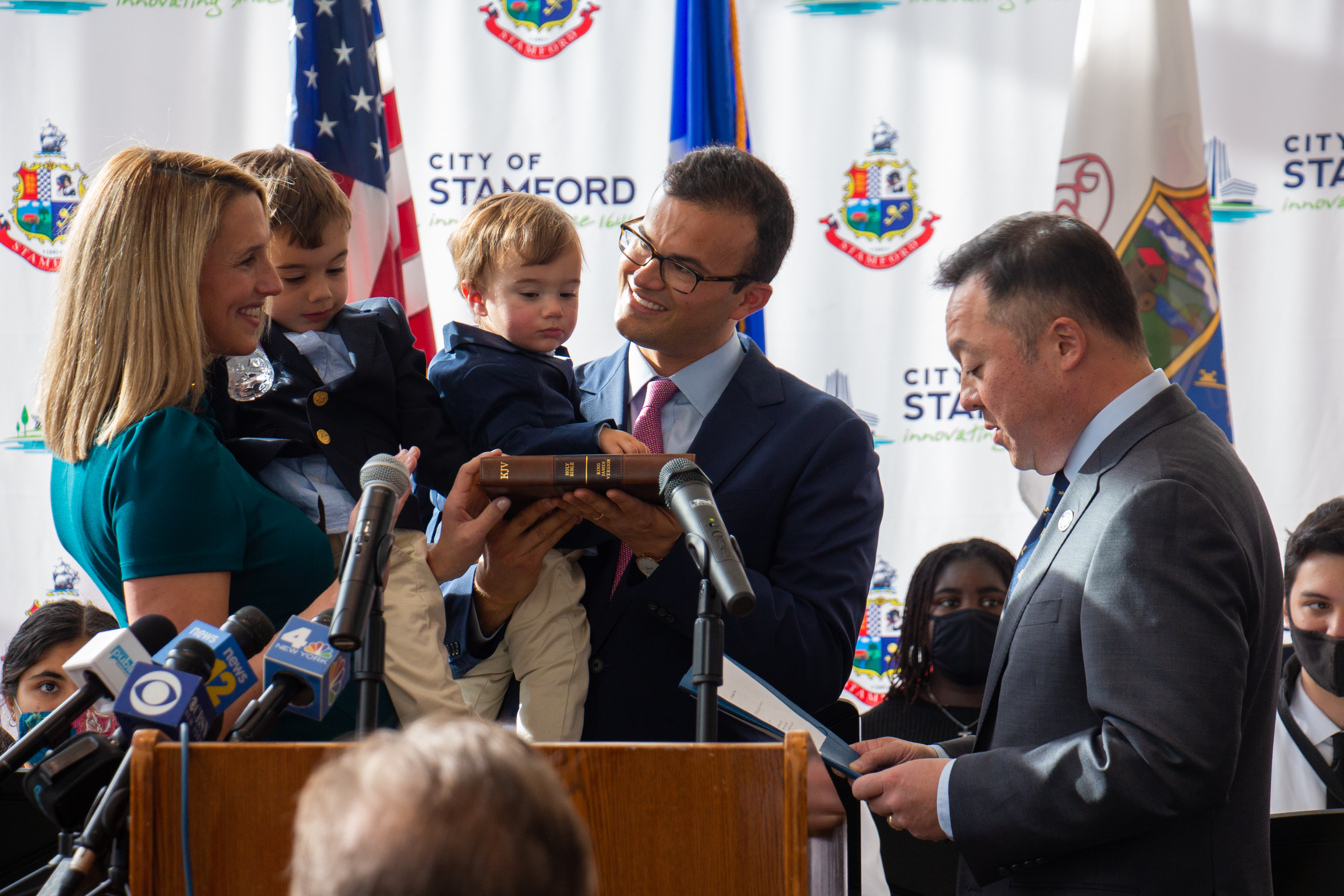
Mayor Simmons receives the oath of office from Connecticut Attorney General William Tong.

==== Cabinet ====
Prior to being sworn into office, Mayor-elect Simmons appointed State Senator Patricia Billie Miller, Cradle to Career President Bridget Fox, and Stamford Health President Kathleen Silard to serve as co-chairs for her transition team. Miller was the most senior legislator among the Stamford delegation and an ally to Simmons throughout her mayoral campaign. Fox previously served in the City of Stamford under Mayors Malloy and Pavia. Fox was later appointed as Simmons' chief of staff.

After being sworn in as Mayor, Simmons announced she would retain two cabinet members from the previous administration: Sandra Dennies as Director of Administration, and Ted Jankowski as Director of Public Safety, Health, and Welfare. Dennies and Jankowski were both incumbents in their positions who served under Mayor Martin. Dennies had previously served as Director of Administration under Mayor Malloy. Jankowski was nominated by Mayor Pavia in 2012 and reappointed by Martin for both of his terms.

Simmons brought in new appointments for cabinet positions including Matthew Quinones as Director of Operations, Doug Dalena as Director of Legal Affairs, and Loren Nadres as Director of Economic Development. Quinones had previously served on Stamford's Board of Representatives since 2013, including as President of the Board from 2017 to 2021. Dalena left his position as Deputy General Counsel to Governor Lamont to accept the position in Stamford. Nadres had worked in New York City on economic issues for over a decade prior to accepting her role in Stamford. All of Simmons' appointments were approved by the Board of Representatives. However, the majority of Simmons' initial cabinet resigned within her first year including Jankowski, Dennies, Dalena, and Nadres.

==== First Year ====
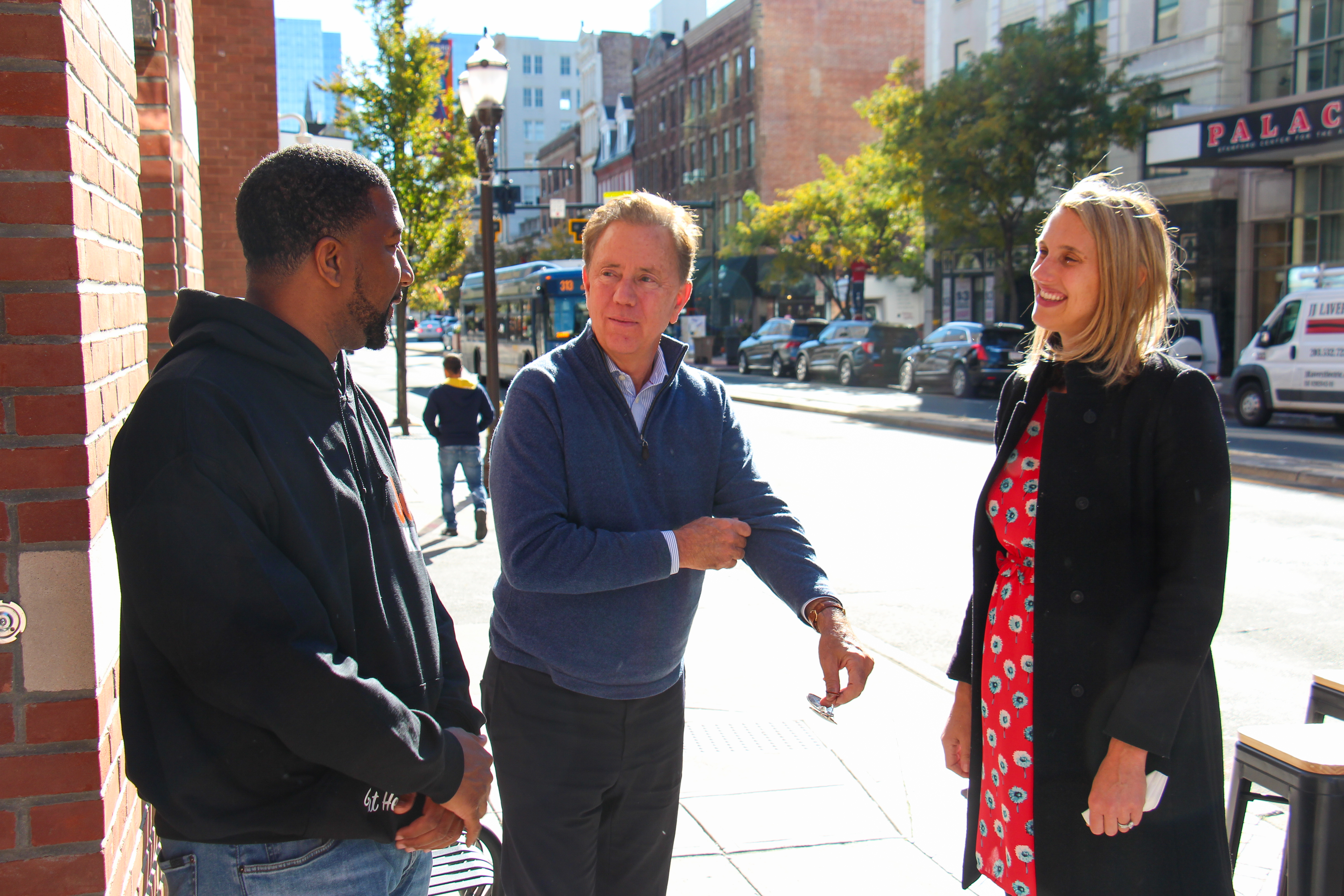
Simmons speaks with Governor Lamont and a Stamford business owner

In her first year as Mayor, Simmons pursued policies that addressed the affordability of living in Stamford. Her administration's first-year budget recommended a 1 percent tax increase. This increase was below the city's average of 2 to 3 percent each year from 2013 to 2022. Simmons pursued capital budget increases for sidewalk construction and school buildings while obtaining state and federal funding to offset the increased cost on taxpayers. These capital investments echoed a claim made by commentators during Simmons' mayoral campaign that her connections to state and federal agencies could result in more funding for local initiatives.

In August 2022, Simmons' administration pursued a project to renovate Stamford's Glenbrook Community Center into affordable housing. The proposal received significant pushback. Stamford's Board of Representatives Legislative and Rules Committee voted against the proposal and local residents organized in opposition to the plan. In a public meeting with organizers, Simmons claimed the proposal was the target of misinformation. She later submitted her first op-ed to the local newspaper emphasizing the claims of misinformation and characterizing counter-proposals as "not operationally viable or fiscally responsible." Despite her initial defense of the proposal, Simmons eventually withdrew the proposal before it was voted on by the board.

Simmons' public comments about the failed affordable housing proposal received criticism from board members after the proposal was rescinded. Prior to withdrawing the proposal, Simmons attended a conference in Chicago and claimed opposition to affordable housing in Stamford included "really abhorrent language from some community members around 'Are there going to be background checks for the people living in this facility?' and just really despicable language." These comments were shared by Simmons on her own personal Instagram page. When asked to identify individuals who used this language, Simmons singled out Democratic Majority Leader Nina Sherwood and another board member of the same party. Sherwood said the mayor's claim was "a complete fabrication" and asked Simmons to "tell the truth and apologize for her hurtful Chicago statements." Simmons denied to elaborate on her claims and stated she wasn't interested in "calling people out individually." Stamford's Board of Representatives requested a meeting to privately discuss "alleged and misconstrued comments" but the outcome of this request was not publicly reported.

==== Charter Revision ====
In 2022, Stamford initiated a charter review process which is required by the city’s charter every 10 years. The charter revision committee’s draft changes were revealed in May 2023 and were characterized as shifting municipal power from the mayor to the Board of Representatives. The proposed changes covered a variety of areas of municipal governance, but public discussion focused on changes that either directly or indirectly related to housing. These changes would have made it easier for the public and the Board of Representatives to challenge newly approved developments in Stamford through appeals or legal action.

Simmons opposed the proposed charter revisions. In an op-ed published by the Stamford Advocate on June 27, she argued the revisions would undermine goals she had for her administration such as advancing the city’s economic prosperity and making government more responsive to residents. Simmons’ op-ed made reference to her personally advocating to “the state to preserve existing tools in our City Charter”. This was later reported to be a reference to a provision in Connecticut’s budget bill that year to outlaw specific proposed revisions to Stamford's charter. Simmons had requested this provision from her former colleagues in the state legislature. This budget bill was passed by Connecticut’s legislature in early June 2023, and was set to be signed by Governor Lamont on June 29 — two days after the op-ed’s publication.

Simmons’ advocacy to state legislators to block specific proposals in a local charter revision process was criticized by local representatives. One local publication referred to Simmons’ action as a “rat” and this terminology was subsequently used by critics of Simmons. State Representatives David Michel and Anabel Figueroa — two supporters of the proposed charter revisions — voted in favor of the budget bill but criticized Simmons’ action and claimed they were unaware of the language requested by Simmons. Stamford’s President of the Board of Representatives said “the mayor has shown a total lack of respect for the people of the city of Stamford, the Board of Representatives and the Charter Commission.” Simmons’ op-ed defended her actions. Simmons claimed she and the city’s legal counsel met with members of the charter revision committee to express concerns but “these concerns were not taken into consideration”.

Criticism of the charter revision process grew after the Board of Representatives voted to submit the charter revisions as a single-question referendum and for the referendum to take place in 2023. Previously, the city’s legal department advised the board the city’s charter compelled any charter referendum to take place in 2024 or in another year “to coincide with a general election at which either the mayor, state officials or federal officials are to be elected.”

Proponents of the charter revisions repeatedly claimed opponents to the revisions were bankrolled by real estate developers — including Simmons. One news outlet published a drawing depicting Simmons reviewing building plans while surrounded by developers. Stamford’s Democratic Majority Leader for the Board of Representatives Nina Sherwood became a highly visible advocate for the charter revisions and called the referendum a “David and Goliath situation where big money is protecting its interests which are in direct conflict with yours.” Other proponents refuted the claim the revisions were a “power grab” including op-eds from the Chair of the revision committee and former mayoral candidate Barry Michelson.

The charter referendum vote failed. More than 11,000 citizens voted against the proposed changes compared to roughly 8,400 who voted in favor. Simmons called the vote “a victory for progress in the city of Stamford.” Less than two days after the vote, the Board of Representatives drafted a resolution to resubmit the charter revision vote for 2024 but later withdrew the proposal. Sherwood was quoted saying “nobody has the stomach to fight any more about this.” Sherwood's faction later lost decisively in Stamford's Democratic City Committee and the Board of Representatives. Sherwood later chose to not seek re-election.

=== 2025 election ===
Following the failed charter referendum, Stamford's Democratic City Committee (DCC) — the entity that endorses official candidates for the Democratic party — had an unusually contested election. Every single district of the DCC's 40-member board was contested by multiple candidates. The initial slate of candidates ran under the name "Democrats United for Stamford" and a counter slate of candidates ran under the name "Stamford Dems for Responsive Government." Each slate was defined by their support or opposition to Simmons' administration. "United" supported Simmons and was assembled by DCC Chair Robin Druckman. Druckman criticized the "Responsive Government" slate as a continuation of the charter referendum, saying "their candidacy is nothing more than their latest attempt to subvert the electorate who overwhelmingly rejected their proposed charter revisions in the November election, now they are trying to infiltrate the Democratic City Committee." Simmons campaigned for a number of "United" candidates. The DCC election occurred on March 5 with "United" candidates winning 27 of the contested 34 seats.

The Democratic City Committee election result had a direct impact on the 2025 general election. Following the election result in March, the DCC passed a rule change preventing members of the DCC for running for other elected office — such as for Stamford's Board of Representatives, Board of Education, or Board of Finance. This directly targeted current DCC members who also served on the Board of Representatives. These members filed a complaint with the state Democratic party to block the rule change, claiming it targeted them for not voting "in lockstep" with Simmons' agenda. The rule was later approved by the state party.

In 2025, the DCC chose to not endorse incumbent members of the Board of Representatives who were consistently critical of Simmons. Many of these incumbents filed paperwork to force a primary and keep their position. Every incumbent lost to an endorsed candidate.

Simmons was endorsed by the Democratic City Committee after a proposed challenger chose to not seek the party's endorsement. She was endorsed by Connecticut's Independent Party for the second time. Simmons faced Republican endorsed candidate Nicola Tarzia in the general election. The election included three write-in candidates who all reused the anti-development platform of Reform Stamford to define their candidacy.

Simmons won re-election in a historic blowout. She received 65 percent of the vote — winning by 34 percentage points with more than twice as many votes as Tarzia. Simmons tied her victory to national trends. "I think particularly in these divided times with everything we're seeing in Washington, they're trying to divide us .. they're trying to use fear mongering to drive us apart but we won't let that happen in Stamford."

== Personal life ==
Simmons lives in Stamford with her husband and four children. Outside of political office, she is involved in the community and serves on the board of the Women's Business Development Council and the Executive Committee of the Stamford Partnership.

== Electoral history ==
Connecticut House of Representatives election, 2014: District 144
Party	Candidate	Votes	%	±%
Democratic	Caroline Simmons	3,752	53.8%	+5.9
Republican	Michael Molgano	3,224	46.2%	−5.9
Total votes		6,976	100%	
Democratic gain from Republican				

Connecticut House of Representatives election, 2016: District 144
Party	Candidate	Votes	%	±%
Democratic	Caroline Simmons	7,441	67%	+13.2
Republican	Steven Bartolo Kolenberg	3,479	31.3%	−14.9
Independent Party	Steven Bartolo Kolenberg	180	1.6%	+1.6
Total	Steven Bartolo Kolenberg	3,659	32.9%	
Total votes		11,100	100%	
Democratic hold				

Connecticut House of Representatives election, 2018: District 144
Party	Candidate	Votes	%	±%
Democratic	Caroline Simmons	7,242	100%	+33.0
Total votes		7,242	100%	
Democratic hold				

Connecticut House of Representatives election, 2020: District 144
Party	Candidate	Votes	%	±%
Democratic	Caroline Simmons	9,106	100%	0
Total votes		9,106	100%	
Democratic hold				

2021 Stamford mayoral election, Democratic primary
Party	Candidate	Votes	%	±%
Democratic	Caroline Simmons	4,156	63.3%	−36.7
Democratic	David Martin	2,412	36.7%	+36.7
Total votes		6,568	100%	

2021 Stamford mayoral election
Party	Candidate	Votes	%	±%
Democratic	Caroline Simmons	14,885	50.2%	−8.4
Independent Party	Caroline Simmons	680	2.3%	+2.3
Total	Caroline Simmons	15,565	52.5%	
Independent	Bobby Valentine	14,060	47.5%	
Total votes		29,625	100%	
Democratic hold				

2025 Stamford mayoral election
Party	Candidate	Votes	%	±%
Democratic	Caroline Simmons	15,829	62.85%	+12.65
Independent Party	Caroline Simmons	676	2.68%	+0.38
Total	Caroline Simmons	16,505	65.53%	
Republican	Nicola Tarzia	7,874	31.27%	+31.27
Independent	Fritz Chery	556	2.21%	
Independent	Michael T. Loughran, Jr.	235	0.93%	
Independent	David Cherniack	14	0.06%	
Total votes		25,184	100%	
Democratic hold				
