= Nick Simmons (disambiguation) =

Nick Simmons (born 1989) is an American reality television personality and writer.

Nick Simmons may also refer to:

- Nick Simmons (politician) (born 1989), American politician
- Nick Simmons (wrestler) (born 1982), American wrestler
- Nick Simmons (speedway rider) (born 1981), British motorcycle speedway rider
- YBN Nahmir (Nicholas Alexander Simmons, born 1999), American rapper

== See also ==
- Nick Symmonds (born 1983), American runner and YouTuber
