= James Shapiro =

James Shapiro may refer to:

- Jim Shapiro (attorney), American attorney
- Jim Shapiro (drummer) (born 1965), American rock musician
- Jim Shapiro (politician), American politician
- James Shapiro (physician), British-born Canadian doctor who developed the Edmonton protocol
- James A. Shapiro (born 1943), American professor of biochemistry and molecular biology
- James S. Shapiro (born 1955), American professor of English and comparative literature, non-fiction author
