= Senator Scofield =

Senator Scofield may refer to:

- Clay Scofield, Alabama State Senate
- Edward Scofield (1842–1925), Wisconsin State Senate
- Edwin L. Scofield (1852–1918), Connecticut State Senate
- Glenni William Scofield (1817–1891), Pennsylvania State Senate
- Sandra K. Scofield (born 1947), Nebraska State Senate
