= Hubert Delany =

Hubert Delany may refer to:

- Hubert Thomas Delany, American civil rights pioneer, lawyer, politician and judge
- Hubert Douglas Delany, his great-grandson, member of the Connecticut House of Representatives
