= Connecticut's 144th House of Representatives district =

American legislative district

Connecticut's 144th State House of Representatives district
Representative
Hubert Douglas Delany; D

Connecticut's 144th House of Representatives district elects one member of the Connecticut House of Representatives. It encompasses parts of Stamford and has been represented by Democrat Hubert Douglas Delany since 2022.

== List of representatives ==
List of representatives from Connecticut's 144th State House district
Representative	Party	Years	District home	Note
John W. Boyd	Republican	1967–1969	Westport	Seat created
Edwin R. Green	Democratic	1969–1971	Westport	
Alan Harris Nevas	Republican	1971–1973	Westport	
Sidney M. Sherer	Republican	1973–1975	Stamford	
Thom Serrani	Democratic	1975–1981	Stamford	
John Wayne Fox	Democratic	1981–2005	Stamford	
Jim Shapiro	Democratic	2005–2011	Stamford	
Michael Molgano	Republican	2011–2015	Stamford	
Caroline Simmons	Democratic	2015–2021	Stamford	Elected mayor of Stamford, Connecticut
Hubert Douglas Delany	Democratic	2022–	Stamford	Elected in special election

== Recent elections ==
=== 2022 ===
2022 Connecticut State House of Representatives election, 144th District
Party	Candidate	Votes	%
Democratic	Hubert Delany (incumbent)	4,381	64.33
Republican	Mitchell Bell	2,429	35.67
Total votes		8,762	100.0%

=== 2022 special ===
2022 Connecticut House of Representatives special elections, District 144
Party	Candidate	Votes	%
Democratic	Hubert Douglas Delany	1,661	55.7
Republican	Danny Melchionne	1,323	44.3
Total votes		2,984	100.00
Democratic hold			

=== 2020 ===
2020 Connecticut State House of Representatives election, District 144
Party	Candidate	Votes	%
Democratic	Caroline Simmons (incumbent)	9,106	100.00
Democratic hold			

=== 2018 ===
2018 Connecticut State House of Representatives election, District 144
Party	Candidate	Votes	%
Democratic	Caroline Simmons (incumbent)	7,242	100.00
Democratic hold			

=== 2016 ===
2016 Connecticut House of Representatives election, District 144
Party	Candidate	Votes	%
Democratic	Caroline Simmons (Incumbent)	7,441	67.04
Republican	Steven Kolenberg	3,659	32.96
Total votes		11,100	100.00
Democratic hold			

=== 2014 ===
2014 Connecticut House of Representatives election, District 144
Party	Candidate	Votes	%
Democratic	Caroline Simmons	3,752	53.8
Republican	Michael Molgano (incumbent)	3,224	46.2
Total votes		6,976	100.00
Democratic gain from Republican			

=== 2012 ===
2012 Connecticut House of Representatives election, District 144
Party	Candidate	Votes	%
Republican	Caroline Simmons	5,082	52.1
Democratic	Michael Pollard	4,676	47.9
Total votes		9,758	100.00
Republican hold			
