= Alfred N. Phillips =

American politician

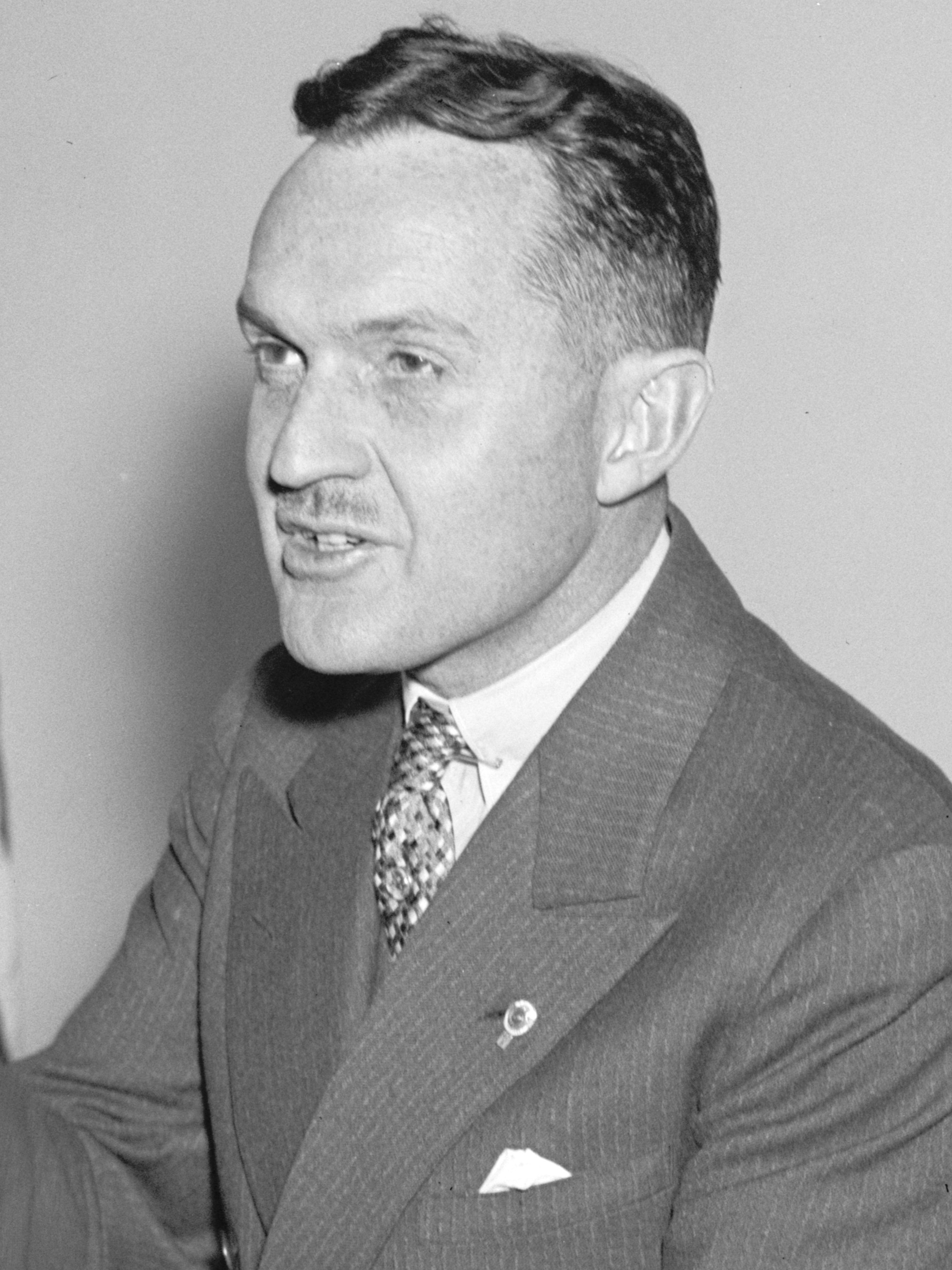

Member of the U.S. House of Representatives from Connecticut's 4th district
- In office January 3, 1937 – January 3, 1939
- Preceded by: Schuyler Merritt
- Succeeded by: Albert E. Austin

Mayor of Stamford, Connecticut
- In office 1923–1924
- In office 1927–1928
- In office 1935–1936

Personal details
- Born: Alfred Noroton Phillips Jr. April 23, 1894 Darien, Connecticut, US
- Died: January 18, 1970 (aged 75) Stamford, Connecticut, US
- Resting place: St. Stephen's Cemetery; Earleville, Maryland, US
- Party: Democratic
- Education: Hotchkiss School; Yale University

Military service
- Branch/service: United States Army
- Years of service: 1917 – 1918
- Rank: First Lieutenant
- Unit: Field Artillery

Alfred Noroton Phillips Jr. (April 23, 1894 – January 18, 1970) was a Democratic member of the United States House of Representatives from Connecticut's 4th congressional district and mayor of Stamford, Connecticut from 1923 to 1924, from 1927 to 1928, and from 1935 to 1936.

== Biography ==
Born in Darien, Connecticut, Phillips attended the public schools, Betts Academy, Stamford, Connecticut, and Hotchkiss School, Lakeville, Connecticut. He graduated from Yale University in 1917. At Yale, he was an editor of campus humor magazine The Yale Record. During the First World War, he served as a first lieutenant in the Field Artillery, United States Army, in 1917 and 1918, with overseas service. He moved to Stamford, Connecticut, in 1918. He served as major in the Connecticut National Guard Reserve 1928-1933. He was employed with the Charles H. Phillips Chemical Co. from early youth until 1923, and as publisher of a newspaper in Darien after 1922. He served as mayor of Stamford in 1923 and 1924, in 1927 and 1928, and 1935 and 1936. He was commander of the American Legion of Connecticut in 1919. He served as member of the Democratic State Central committee.

Phillips was elected as a Democrat to the Seventy-fifth Congress (January 3, 1937 – January 3, 1939). He was an unsuccessful candidate for reelection in 1938 to the Seventy-sixth Congress. He resumed his publishing business in Darien, Connecticut, and the management of his dairy farm in Cecilton, Maryland. He was commissioned as a captain, Military Police, United States Army, and served from July 17, 1942, to August 16, 1944, with service in North Africa. He died in Stamford, Connecticut, January 18, 1970. He was interred in St. Stephen's Cemetery, Earleville, Maryland.

== See also ==
U.S. House of Representatives
Preceded by Schuyler Merritt	Member of the U.S. House of Representatives from Connecticut's 4th congressional district 1937 – 1939	Succeeded by Albert E. Austin
