= 2021 Stamford mayoral election =

- November 2, 2021
- Turnout: 41%
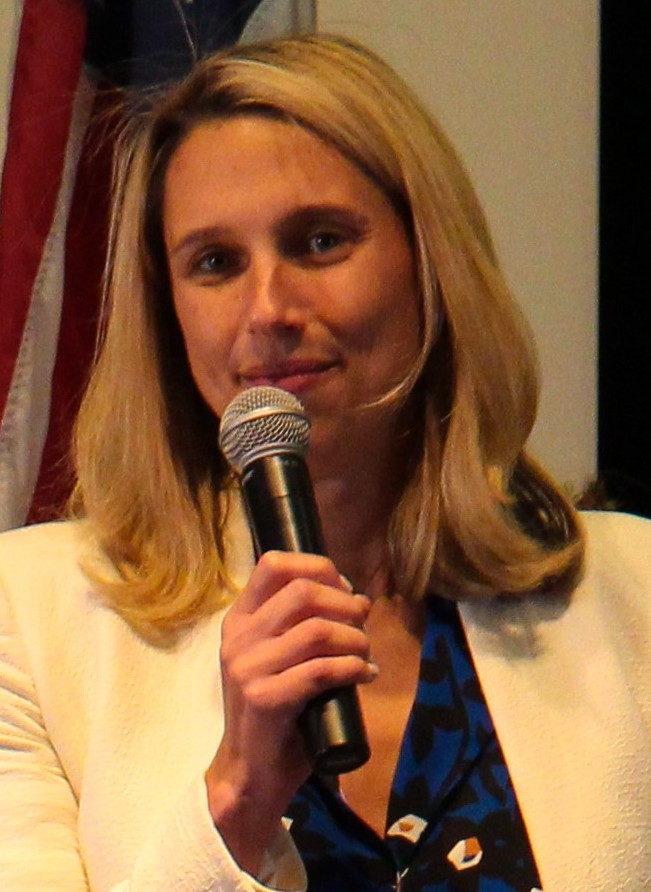

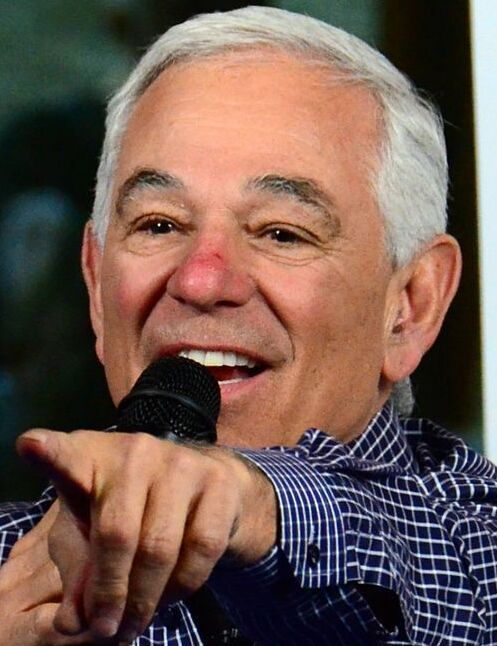
Candidate	Caroline Simmons	Bobby Valentine
Party	Democratic	Independent
Alliance	Independent Party
Popular vote	15,566	14,060
Percentage	52.54%	47.46%
- Results by district
Mayor before election
David Martin
Democratic
Elected mayor
Caroline Simmons
Democratic

The 2021 Stamford mayoral election was held on November 2, 2021. Incumbent Democratic mayor David Martin sought re-election to a third term in office, but lost renomination to state representative Caroline Simmons. Simmons, who was also endorsed by the Independent Party, faced unaffiliated candidate Bobby Valentine.

Initial results indicated Simmons had a slight lead over Valentine. Absentee ballots swung heavily in Simmons' favor resulting in a 5-points lead over Valentine. Following her election, Simmons became Stamford's first female mayor.

== Democratic primary ==
On July 25, the Stamford City Committee narrowly voted to endorse Simmons over the incumbent Martin, with 21 members voting for Simmons and 19 voting for Martin. Shortly thereafter, Martin declared his intention to continue with his candidacy and force a primary. According to the Connecticut Secretary of State, Martin was required to collect 1,550 signatures, 5 percent of the total number of registered Democrats in the city. Martin collected over 3,000 signatures, guaranteeing a Democratic Primary.

The primary was held on September 14. The ballot also included elections for the Stamford Board of Representative District 5, and Stamford Board of Representative District 19. Simmons won in a landslide, earning a majority of support in all of city's 20 voting districts. Martin conceded the night of the primary and endorsed Simmons.

=== Candidates ===
==== Nominee ====
- Caroline Simmons, state representative

==== Eliminated in Primary ====
- David Martin, incumbent mayor (endorsed Simmons)

==== Declined ====
- Christopher Malloy, former member of the Stamford Democratic Committee and nephew of former mayor and former governor of Connecticut Dannel Malloy (endorsed Simmons)

=== Fundraising ===
Campaign finance reports as of July 17, 2021
Quarter	1st quarter (January—March 2021)			2nd quarter (April—June 2021)		
Candidate	Total raised	Contributors	% who live in Stamford	Total raised	Contributors	% who live in Stamford
David Martin	$52,800	100	58%	$25,600	94	70%
Caroline Simmons	$158,000	484	33%	$81,600	420	60%

=== Results ===
2021 Democratic primary results by district Simmons 50–60% 60–70% 70–80%

Democratic primary
Party	Candidate	Votes	%
Democratic	Caroline Simmons	4,156	63.28%
Democratic	David Martin (incumbent)	2,412	36.72%
Total votes		6,568	100%

== Republican Party ==
The Republican Stamford City Committee endorsed Joe Corsello as its mayoral candidate. However, he withdrew from the race on September 8 and endorsed Bobby Valentine.

=== Withdrawn ===
- Joe Corsello, drummer and retired police detective

== Independent Party ==
The Independent Party of Connecticut endorsed Caroline Simmons for mayor in August 2021.

=== Nominee ===
- Caroline Simmons, state representative (Note: Simmons is a member of the Democratic Party, but can seek any party's nomination or endorsement because of Connecticut's electoral fusion system.)

== Third parties and independents ==
=== Declared ===
- Bobby Valentine, former baseball player and manager and former Stamford Director of Public Safety

== General election ==
=== Campaign ===
Bobby Valentine's candidacy has generated media scrutiny after he accidentally uploaded a Cameo video showing him failing to pick up his dogs poo from a neighbors yard. Valentine claimed he couldn't recall intentionally not picking it up.

=== Debates ===
Date	Location	Link
October 19, 2021	Ferguson Library	Full Debate-Prometheum Foundation

=== Fundraising ===
Caroline Simmons campaign finance reports as of October 24, 2021
Quarter	1st quarter (2/11/2021—2/31/2021)			2nd quarter (4/1/2021—6/30/2021)			7th day preceding primary (7/1/2021—9/5/2021)			3rd quarter (9/6/2021—9/30/2021)			7th day preceding election (10/1/2021—10/24/2021)		
Candidate	Total raised	Contributors	% who live in Stamford	Total raised	Contributors	% who live in Stamford	Total raised	Contributors	% who live in Stamford	Total raised	Contributors	% who live in Stamford	Total raised	Contributors	Total
Caroline Simmons	$157,688	484	33%	$81,619	420	60%	$35,695	67	N/A	$148,854	126	54%	$247,145	131	$681,751.49

Bobby Valentine campaign finance reports as of October 24, 2021
Quarter	1st quarter (January—March 2021)			2nd quarter (4/1/2021—5/30/2021)			3rd quarter (7/1/2021—9/30/2021)			7th day preceding election (10/1/2021—10/24/2021)		
Candidate	Total raised	Contributors	% who live in Stamford	Total raised	Contributors	% who live in Stamford	Total raised	Contributors	% who live in Stamford	Total raised	Contributors	Total
Bobby Valentine	did not file			$303,219	964	50%	$208,876	834	66%	$44,719	99	$556,814.21

=== Results ===
General election results
Party	Candidate	Votes	%
Democratic	Caroline Simmons	14,886	50.25%
Independent Party	Caroline Simmons	680	2.3%
Total	Caroline Simmons	15,566	52.54%
Independent	Bobby Valentine	14,060	47.46%
Total votes		29,626	100%
Democratic hold			

Votes by district
District	Caroline Simmons	Bobby Valentine
1	881	1054
2	463	405
3	515	365
4	455	359
5	431	86
6	713	493
7	592	425
8	543	567
9	455	236
10	633	404
11	803	646
12	637	497
13	1105	1228
14	935	772
15	897	736
16	1246	1057
17	879	861
18	984	1469
19	1158	1130
20	1241	1270
