= Nick Simmons (politician) =

American politician

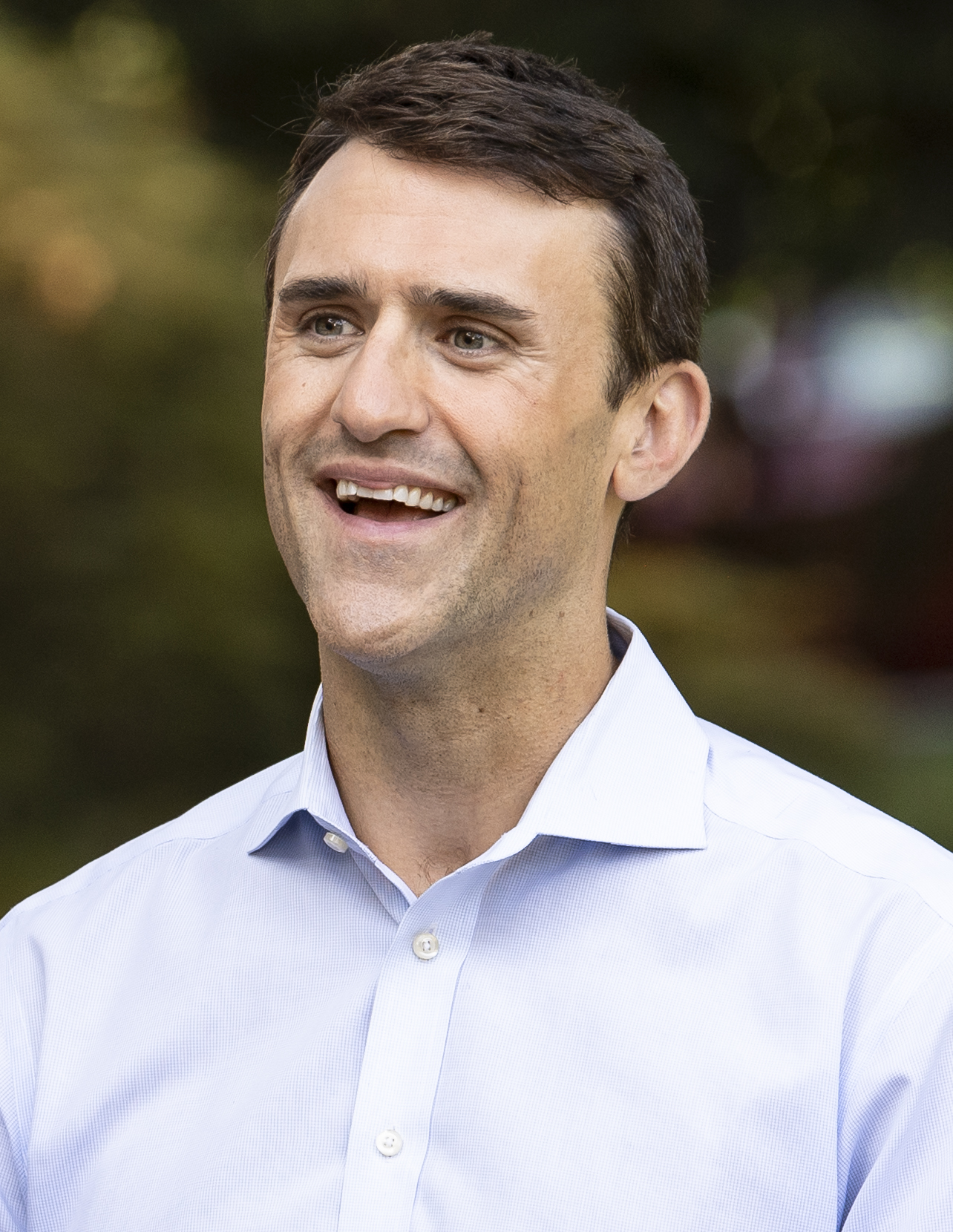
- Simmons in 2024
- Born: Nicholas S. Simmons; May 1, 1989 (age 37); Greenwich, Connecticut, U.S.
- Education: Yale University (BA); Harvard University (MBA, MPA)
- Political party: Democratic
- Spouse: Rachel Yat Munsie (m. 2022)
- Children: 1
- Relatives: Caroline Simmons (sister)
- Website: Official website

Nicholas S. Simmons (born May 1, 1989) is an American educator, civil servant and politician who served as deputy chief of staff to Governor Ned Lamont in 2023, as well as senior advisor in the Biden administration in 2021.

In February 2024, Simmons announced his candidacy for Connecticut State Senate in the 36th district, encompassing parts of Greenwich and Stamford, against Republican Ryan Fazio. In September 2024, he was endorsed by the Independent Party of Connecticut.

== Early life and education ==
Simmons was born May 1, 1989 in Greenwich, Connecticut, one of five children, to Steven J. Simmons (born 1946), a graduate of Cornell University and Harvard Law School, a former professor at University of California, Irvine, a cable entrepreneur turned contemporary artist, and Mary "Eileen" Simmons (née Haggerty; born 1949). His father, who is Jewish and originally from Long Island, has been described as centrist or moderately Republican whilst his mother, an Irish Catholic from California, as being a Democrat. His older sister is Caroline Simmons, who serves as mayor of Stamford.

Simmons completed a Bachelor of Arts in political science from Yale University, followed by a Master of Business Administration from Harvard Business School and a Master of Public Administration from the Harvard Kennedy School.

== Career ==
After graduating from Yale University, he worked for a brief time on Wall Street before becoming a seventh-grade math teacher at a middle school in Harlem. When he was 26-years-old, he became one of the youngest acting principals in New York.

After teaching, Simmons joined Governor Ned Lamont's administration, most recently serving as deputy chief of staff to the governor.

In 2021, Simmons was chosen to serve as a senior advisor in the United States Department of Education, where he focused on nationwide school reopening during COVID-19.

=== State Senate race ===
Simmons announced his candidacy as a Democrat for Connecticut's 36th State Senate district in February 2024. He was set to face fellow Democrat Trevor Crow in the primary until she dropped out of the race on March 29. Simmons was unanimously nominated by the Democratic Town Committees of Greenwich, Stamford, and New Canaan on May 14 as the Democratic candidate for the 36th district. He ultimately lost the race to Republican Ryan Fazio.

== Personal life ==
On July 9, 2022, Simmons married Rachel Yat Munsie (born 1991), with whom he has one child.

Simmons resides in Stamford, Connecticut.
