= Michael Molgano =

American politician

Member of the Connecticut House of Representatives from the 144th district
- In office January 5, 2011 – January 7, 2015
- Preceded by: Jim Shapiro
- Succeeded by: Caroline Simmons

Personal details
- Born: February 27, 1959 (age 67) Stamford, Connecticut, U.S.
- Party: Republican

Michael Molgano (born February 27, 1959) is an American politician who served in the Connecticut House of Representatives from the 144th district from 2011 to 2015.
