= R. Jay Walsh =

American politician

Robert Jay Walsh
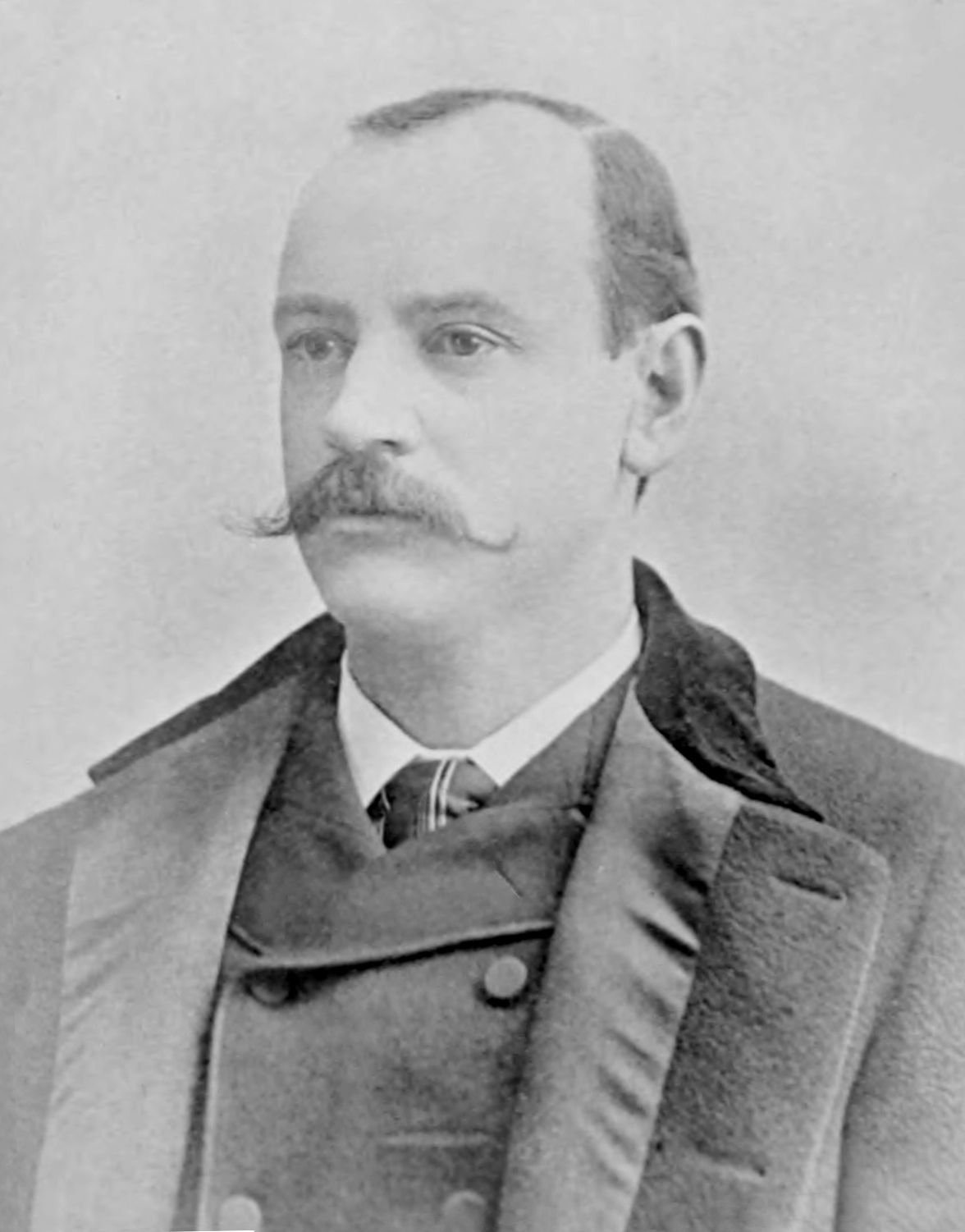

39th Secretary of the State of Connecticut
- In office 1889–1893
- Governor: Morgan Bulkeley
- Preceded by: Leverett M. Hubbard
- Succeeded by: John J. Phelan

Member of the Connecticut Senate from the 12th District
- In office 1885–1888
- Preceded by: Edwin L. Scofield
- Succeeded by: Benjamin P. Mead

Personal details
- Born: August 1, 1854 Lewisboro, New York
- Died: December 7, 1916 (aged 62) Greenwich, Connecticut
- Resting place: Putnam Cemetery, Greenwich, Connecticut
- Party: Republican
- Spouse(s): Annie A. Merritt (daughter of Matthew F. Merritt, m. October 7, 1879)
- Children: Lucy, Edith, Roberta
- Education: High Ridge Institute
- Occupation: blacksmith, lawyer
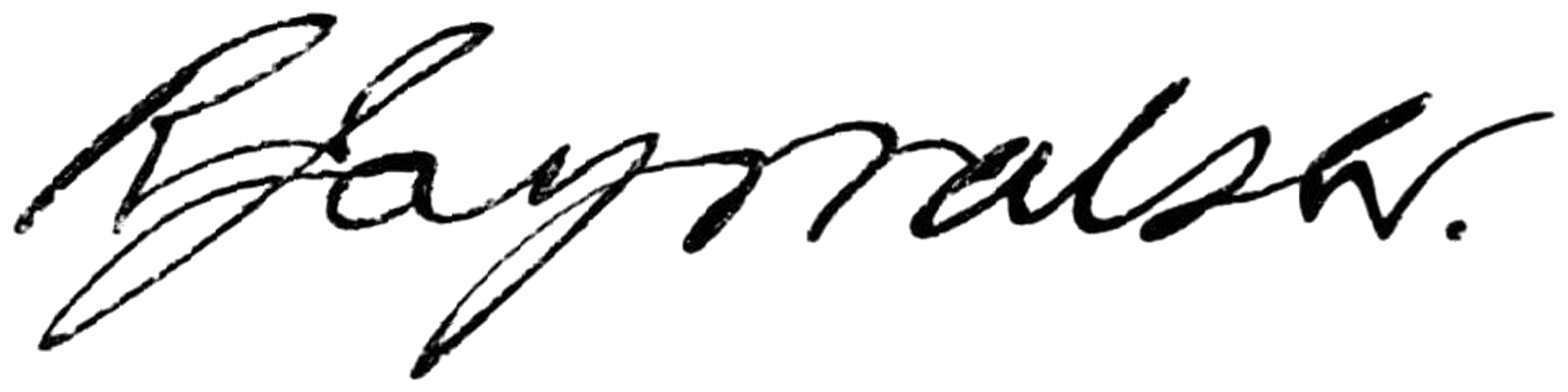
- Signature

Robert Jay Walsh (August 1, 1854 – December 7, 1916) was Secretary of the State of Connecticut from 1889 to 1893, and a member of the Connecticut Senate representing the 12th District from 1885 to 1888. He also served as President pro tempore of the Connecticut Senate.

He was born August 1, 1854, in Lewisboro, New York, the son of James F. and Annie E. Walsh. At the age of ten, he moved to Ridgefield, Connecticut where he attended High Ridge Institute. At the age of fourteen he became an apprentice in a blacksmith shop. After his apprenticeship, he became a teacher. He enrolled in the Normal School at New Britain.

In 1877, he began studying law in the office of Huested W. R. Hoyt, in Greenwich. In 1880, Walsh was admitted to the Fairfield County bar. In 1882, he opened his own law office in Greenwich.

He campaigned for Garfield in 1880. In the same year, he began his service on the Connecticut Republican Central Committee.

In 1882, he was appointed corporation counsel of the town and borough of Greenwich.

In 1884, he was elected to the Connecticut Senate. In 1886, he was re-elected by a wider margin. In 1886 and 1887 he was President Pro Tempore of the Senate.

He was appointed judge of the Criminal Branch of the Court of Common Pleas, but resigned in 1900 to continue his law practice, business and political pursuits.

He was an alternate delegate to the Republican National Convention from Connecticut in 1900.

He died at his home in Greenwich in December 7, 1916.

== Associations ==
- President, Greenwich Trust Company
- President, Greenwich Water Company
- President, Putnam Cemetery Association
- President, Abendroth Bros. Foundry of Port Chester, N. Y.
- President, Port Chester Water Works
- Director, New York & Stamford St. R. R
- Trustee, Y. M. C. A.
- Trustee, Greenwich Library Association
- Charter member, Fairfield County Golf Club (later the Greenwich Country Club)
- Member, Blind Brook Club
- Member, Indian Harbor Yacht Club
- Member, Republican Club of New York
- Member, Acacia Lodge, F. & A. M. of Greenwich
- Member, Empire Lodge, I. O. O. F. of Greenwich

Preceded by Leverett M. Hubbard	Secretary of the State of Connecticut; 1889–1893	Succeeded by John J. Phelan
Connecticut State Senate
Preceded by Edwin L. Scofield	Member of the Connecticut Senate from the 12th District; 1885–1888	Succeeded by Benjamin P. Mead
