= Hubert Douglas Delany =

American politician (born 1993)

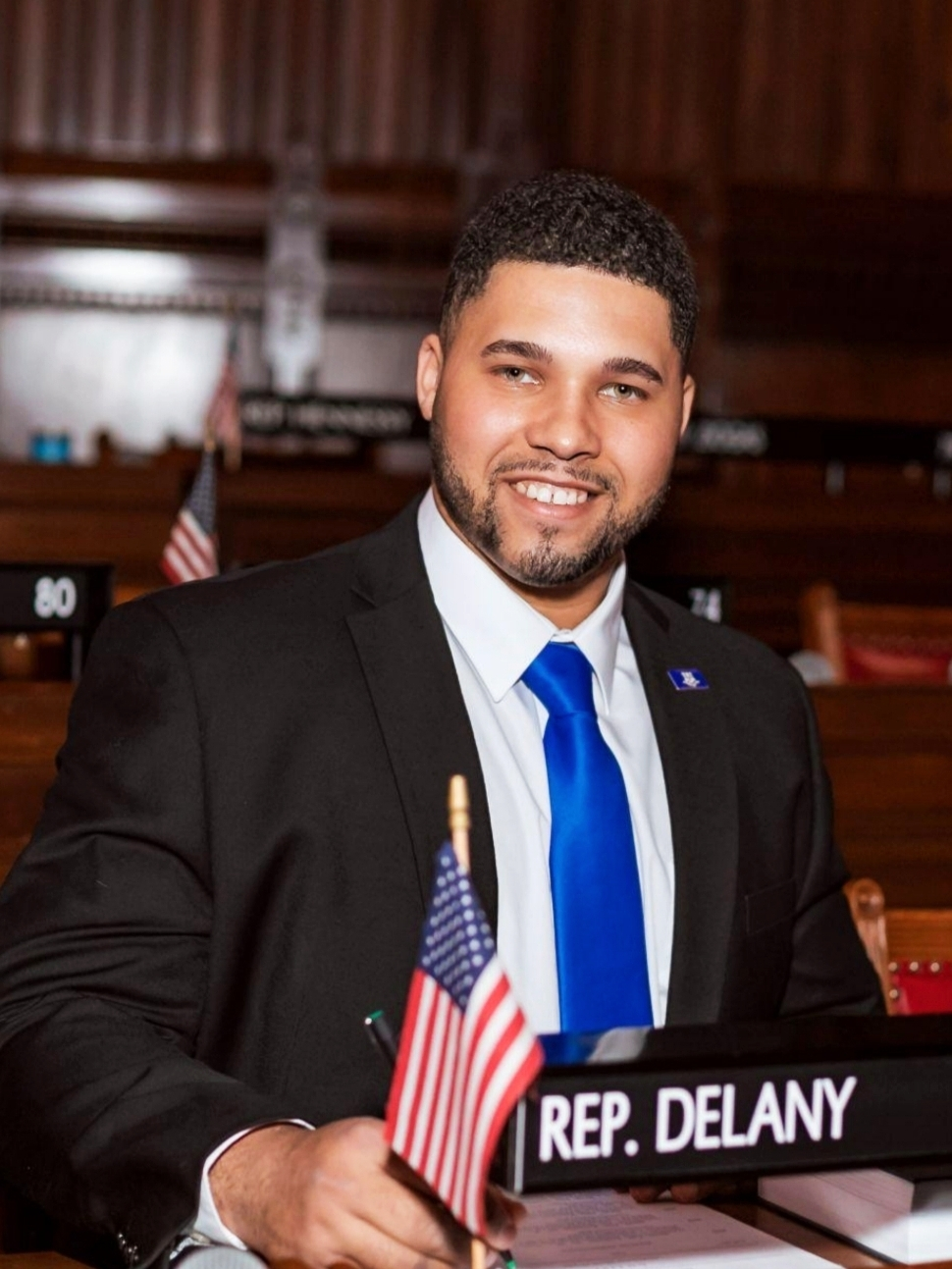
- Representative Delany III in 2023

Member of the Connecticut House of Representatives from the 144th district
- Incumbent
- Assumed office January 26, 2022
- Preceded by: Caroline Simmons

Personal details
- Born: Hubert Douglas Delany III; December 31, 1993 (age 32) Stamford, Connecticut, U.S.
- Party: Democratic
- Relatives: Henry Beard Delany(great-great-grandfather) Hubert Thomas Delany(great-grandfather) Sarah Louise Delany(great-grandaunt) Annie Elizabeth Delany(great grandaunt) Samuel R Delany(cousin)
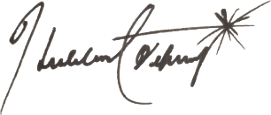
- Signature
- Website: www.hubertforct.com www.housedems.ct.gov/Delany/Biography

Military service
- Branch/service: United States Army
- Years of service: 2015 – 2026
- Rank: Sergeant
- Unit: 353d Civil Affairs Command 8th Psychological Operations Group 1st Special Forces Command (Airborne) United States Army Europe and Africa XVIII Airborne Corps
- Awards: Army Commendation Medal (5) Army Achievement Medal (4) Humanitarian Service Medal (2) Military Outstanding Volunteer Service Medal Good Conduct Medal National Defense Service Medal Global War on Terrorism Service Medal Non-Commissioned Officer Professional Development Ribbon

Hubert Douglas Delany (/dəˈleɪni/; born December 31, 1993) is an American politician serving as a member of the Connecticut House of Representatives for the 144th District, representing Stamford, Connecticut. Delany, a Democrat, was a U.S. Army sergeant who served as a photojournalist, writer, and mass communications specialist.

== Early life ==
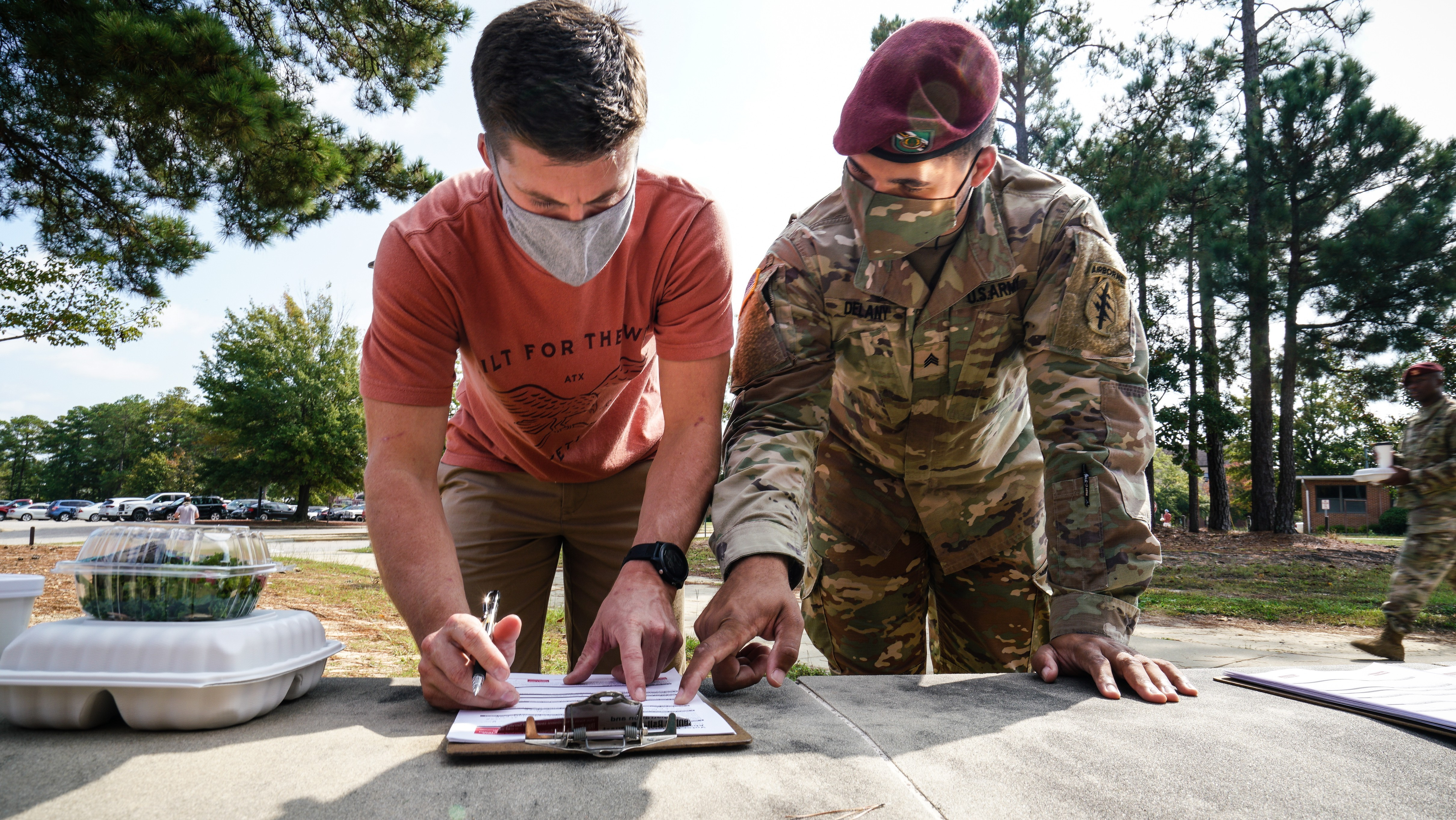
Delany (right) registering soldiers to vote (photo by Liem Huynh)

Hubert Douglas Delany III was born on December 31, 1993, to parents Deborah Delany and Hubert Delany Sr. II, at Stamford Hospital in Stamford, Connecticut. Delany grew up in both Stamford and nearby Wilton for the first few years of his life. As a teenager growing up in Stamford's Waterside district, Hubert helped create Stamford's first Diversity Festival.

Delany is the great-grandson of Hubert Thomas Delany, an American civil rights pioneer, lawyer, politician. His twice great-grandfather, Henry Beard Delany (1858–1928), was born enslaved, but became the first African American Bishop Suffragan of the Episcopal Church (United States). Other notable family members include Harlem Renaissance poet Clarissa Scott Delany and American author, science fiction writer, and literary critic Samuel R. Delany.

== Military career ==
Delany enlisted in the United States Army in August 2015 and attended Basic Combat Training at Fort Jackson, South Carolina and Advanced Individual Training at the Defense Information School in Fort Meade, Maryland.

=== Awards and decorations ===
==== Badges ====
Parachutist Badge

==== Medals and ribbons ====
Army Commendation Medal with four oak leaf clusters
Army Achievement Medal with three oak leaf clusters
Humanitarian Service Medal with bronze service star
Military Outstanding Volunteer Service Medal
The Army Good Conduct Medal
National Defense Service Medal
Global War on Terrorism Medal
Non-Commissioned Officer Professional Development Ribbon
Army Service Ribbon
Army Overseas Service Ribbon

== Connecticut General Assembly ==
=== Elections ===
Delany ran as a Democrat in a 2022 special election for the 144th district in the Connecticut House of Representatives to replace representative Caroline Simmons, who resigned to become mayor of Stamford. He won the election against Republican candidate Danny Melchionne.

Delany serves as a Vice Chair of the House Veterans' and Military Affairs Committee. Delany secured a full term later in 2022 by beating Republican Mitchell Bell. Rep. Delany filed to run for reelection in November 2024.
