= Michael Pavia =

American politician

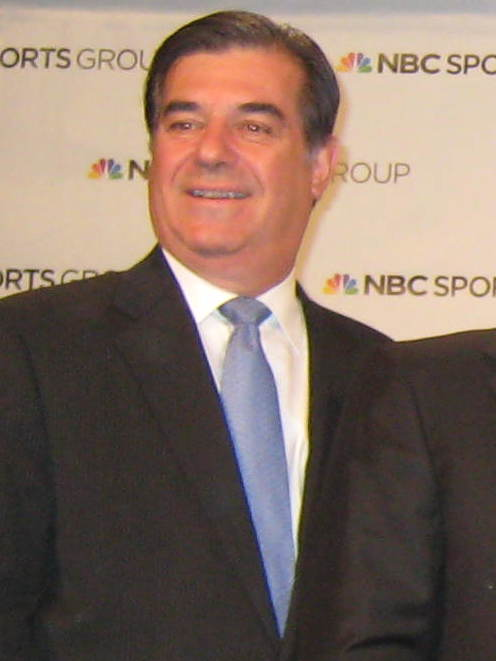

30th Mayor of Stamford
- In office December 1, 2009 – December 1, 2013
- Preceded by: Dan Malloy
- Succeeded by: David Martin

Stamford Board of Representatives from the 18th district
- In office 2003–2006

Personal details
- Party: Republican
- Education: Sacred Heart University (BA); New York University (MA)

Michael Pavia is an American businessman who served as the 30th mayor of Stamford, Connecticut.

== Early life, education, and business career ==
Pavia earned his BA degree in psychology from Sacred Heart University and his master's degree in Urban planning from New York University. At NYU, he had a fellowship from the United States Environmental Protection Agency. He is a lifelong Stamford resident whose grandchildren represent the fifth generation of his family in the city.

He is the founder, Owner, and Director of Pavia Development LLC, a Stamford-based residential, commercial real estate managing, and construction business.

== Stamford government career ==
=== Environmental protection (Before 1983) ===
He has been an Environmental Health Sanitarian with the Stamford Health Department. He created the City's first water pollution control and enforcement program. In 1976, he was hired as the first Executive Director of the Environmental Protection Board.

=== Police Commissioner (1983-1991) ===
Pavia served as a member of Stamford's Police Commission for eight years. He chaired the selection panel that hired approximately 100 new police officers. He participated in a national search that hired a new police chief and reorganize the department.

=== Public Works Commissioner (1991-1995) ===
He served as Stamford's Public Works Commissioner. Incorporating his expertise in development, urban planning and the environment, he implemented many successful programs within the Department that resulted in significant cost savings and increased efficiencies. His creation of a "Capital Projects" team of experts responsible for the oversight and implementation of all capital construction resulted in major projects being delivered on time and under budget.

=== Board of Representatives (2003-2006) ===
An active community organizer and supporter, Mike was also on the board of Directors of the Stamford Historical Society and the Springdale Neighborhood Association. He served on the Stamford Board of Representatives, representing Stamford's 18th District.

== Mayor of Stamford (2009-2013) ==
In 2009, Pavia ran for mayor of Stamford, Connecticut, seeking to succeed Dan Malloy, who decided to run for Governor of Connecticut. He ran as a Republican and defeated David Martin 55%-44%. The turnout rate was 42%.

In 2010, Pavia named former New York Mets manager Bobby Valentine, a lifelong Stamford resident, the 2010 City of Stamford "Citizen of the Year." The next year, he appointed Valentine to become the Director of Public Health and Safety.

Pavia helped commemorate the 10th anniversary of the Sept. 11 terrorist attacks with a new monument and a message of remembrance.

In 2011, Pavia proposed a $470.6 million budget with a 2.93% tax increase. In 2012, he proposed a $483.3 million budget with a 3.66% property tax increase. Education made up 49% of the budget, while 42% made up other city expenses.

As of July 2012, Pavia earned an annual mayoral salary of $150,000.
