= Jim Shapiro (politician) =

American politician

Member of the Connecticut House of Representatives from the 144th district
- In office 2005–2011
- Preceded by: John Wayne Fox
- Succeeded by: Michael Molgano

Personal details
- Party: Democratic

James A. "Jim" Shapiro is an American attorney and former politician from Connecticut. A Democrat, he represented the 144th district of the Connecticut House of Representatives from 2005 to 2011. He lived in Stamford during his tenure. Shapiro did not run for reelection in 2010.
