= Bobby Valentine =

American baseball player and manager (born 1950)

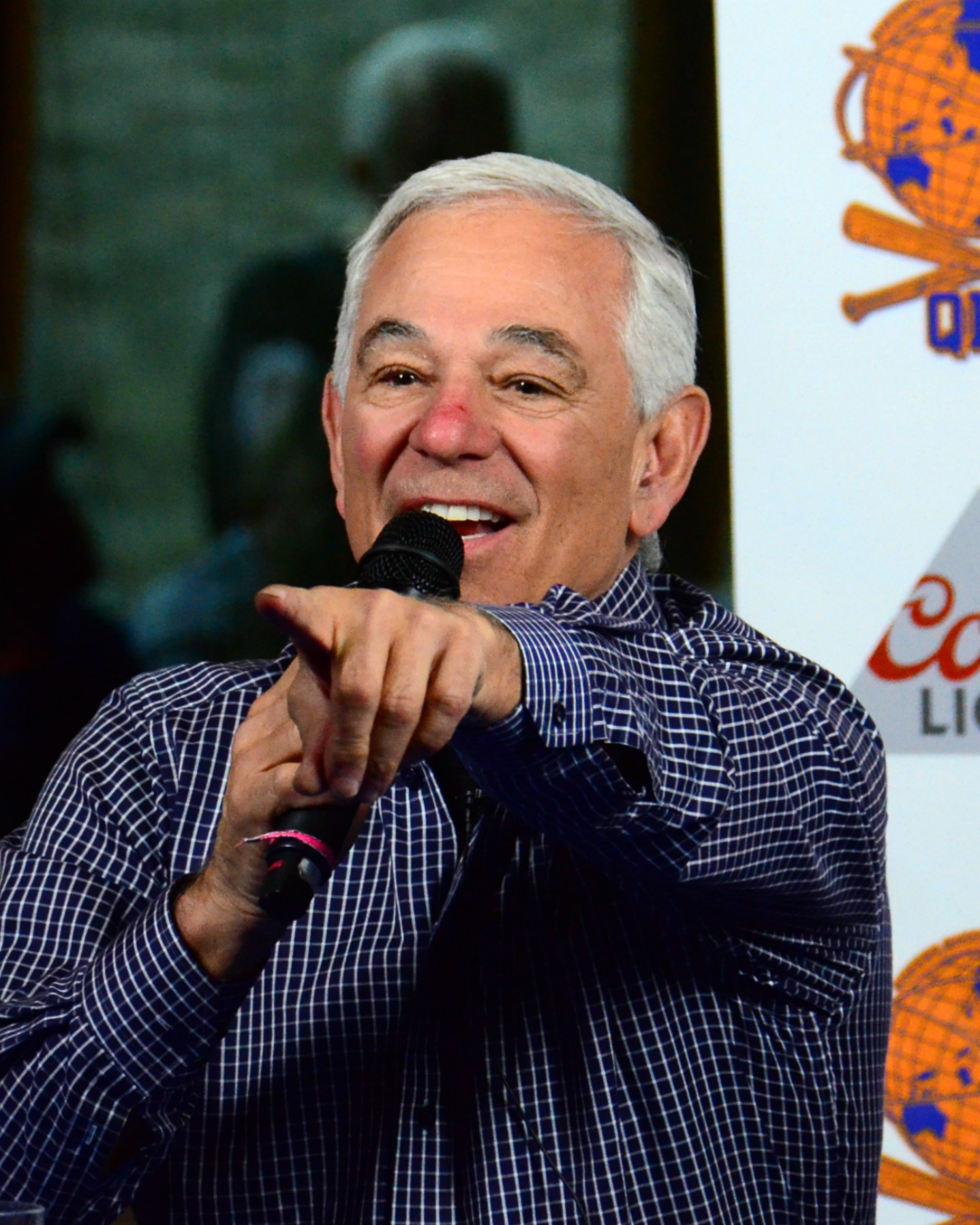
- Valentine in 2017
- Utility player / Manager
- Born: May 13, 1950 (age 76); Stamford, Connecticut, U.S.
- Batted: Right Threw: Right

MLB debut
- September 2, 1969, for the Los Angeles Dodgers

Last MLB appearance
- September 30, 1979, for the Seattle Mariners

MLB statistics
- Batting average: .260
- Home runs: 12
- Runs batted in: 157
- Managerial record: 1,186–1,165
- Winning %: .504

NPB statistics
- Managerial record: 493–450
- Winning %: .523
- Stats at Baseball Reference
- Managerial record at Baseball Reference

Teams
- As player: Los Angeles Dodgers (1969, 1971–1972); California Angels (1973–1975); San Diego Padres (1975–1977); New York Mets (1977–1978); Seattle Mariners (1979); As manager: Texas Rangers (1985–1992); Chiba Lotte Marines (1995); New York Mets (1996–2002); Chiba Lotte Marines (2004–2009); Boston Red Sox (2012); As coach: New York Mets (1983–1985); Cincinnati Reds (1993)

Career highlights and awards
- New York Mets Hall of Fame; Japan Series champion (2005); Golden Spirit Award (2005); Matsutaro Shoriki Award (2005)

Robert John Valentine (born May 13, 1950), nicknamed "Bobby V", is an American former professional baseball player and manager. He also served as the athletic director at Sacred Heart University. Valentine played for the Los Angeles Dodgers (1969, 1971–72), California Angels (1973–1975), San Diego Padres (1975-1977), New York Mets (1977–78), and Seattle Mariners (1979) in MLB. He managed the Texas Rangers (1985–1992), the New York Mets (1996–2002), and the Boston Red Sox (2012) of MLB, as well as the Chiba Lotte Marines of Nippon Professional Baseball (1995, 2004–2009).

Valentine has been an analyst for ESPN's Sunday Night Baseball. In February 2013, CBSSports.com hired Valentine to represent its Fantasy Sports business, including running a viral marketing campaign in which he made fun of the many times he was fired in his career and gave fans a chance to "Hire or Fire Bobby V" one more time.

On November 2, 2021, Valentine lost the election to become mayor of his hometown of Stamford, Connecticut, to Caroline Simmons, the first female elected mayor in Stamford.

== Early years ==
Valentine was born in Stamford, Connecticut, to Joseph and Grace Valentine. He is of Italian descent. He attended Rippowam High School in Stamford, Connecticut, where he was an All-State player in football, baseball and track. He is the only three-time All-State football player in Connecticut history. He set state records for career touchdowns (53), career interceptions for TD (5) and 60-yard dash. The career interception for TD record remains, having later been tied by two other players. As a sophomore in 1965, he averaged 5.6 yards a carry, scored 21 touchdowns and led Rippowam to a 9–0 record and a state championship. He was also a champion ballroom dancer as a teenager, winning a regional competition with his partner at the Waldorf-Astoria in New York and took part in the opening ceremonies of the 1964 New York World's Fair. He was president of the student council.

He was recruited by the University of Nebraska, the University of Notre Dame and the University of Southern California as a star in football and baseball, but ultimately chose USC. In 1967, he played collegiate summer baseball for the Yarmouth Indians of the Cape Cod Baseball League. The Los Angeles Dodgers drafted him fifth overall in the 1968 Major League Baseball draft and he signed with the Dodgers, receiving a $65,000 signing bonus. He attended both USC and Arizona State University while in the Dodgers organization and was a member of the Sigma Chi Fraternity. His roommate at USC was Bill Buckner, who was the Dodgers second round pick in 1968.

== Playing career ==
=== Minor leagues (1968–1970) ===
At age 18, Valentine made his professional debut playing with the Ogden Dodgers of the Rookie Pioneer League, winning the league's MVP Award, hitting .281 with a .460 slugging percentage and leading the league with 20 stolen bases. He was one of only three players in the league to appear in every game. His roommate was Tom Paciorek and was also teammates with Bill Buckner and Steve Garvey. The manager at Ogden was Tommy Lasorda, the start of a friendship that has lasted four decades. In 1969, Valentine impressive enough in Spring Training that he was promoted to the Class AAA Spokane Indians of the Pacific Coast League. After the PCL season ended, he debuted with the Los Angeles Dodgers as a September call-up in 1969 at 19 years old. Though he did not record a major league at-bat that season, he appeared in 5 games as a pinch runner, scoring three runs.

Back with the Spokane Indians for 1970, Valentine was again his league's MVP after batting .340 with fourteen home runs and leading the Pacific Coast League in eight offensive categories. Led by Valentine and manager Lasorda, Spokane won the league championship over the Hawaii Islanders. He suffered a fractured cheekbone when he was beaned in the PCL playoffs that season and also had right knee surgery to repair a ruptured ligament in January 1971.

=== Los Angeles Dodgers (1971–1972) ===
Valentine made the Dodgers out of Spring Training in 1971 and batted .249 with one home run and 25 RBIs in 101 games. His first career MLB hit came on April 25, 1971, an RBI single off Milt Wilcox, scoring Steve Garvey in a 4–2 Dodgers win over the Reds. The following season in 1972, he managed to play in 119 games by playing many different positions—including shortstop, second base, third and all three outfield positions and his batting average improved to .274. He missed time after sustaining a broken nose. Following the season on November 28, 1972, he was packaged in a trade along with Frank Robinson, Billy Grabarkewitz, Bill Singer and Mike Strahler to the California Angels for Andy Messersmith and Ken McMullen.

=== California Angels (1973–1975) ===
Prior to the start of the 1973 season, Valentine was named Caribbean Series MVP playing shortstop for the series champions from the Dominican Republic, Tigres del Licey. The team was managed by Tommy Lasorda.

As a regular starter for the Angels, Valentine had a strong start, leading the Angels with a .302 batting average. Four days after his 23rd birthday, he suffered a multiple compound leg fracture on May 17, 1973, at Anaheim Stadium in a game against the Oakland Athletics after his spikes got caught in the outfield's chain link fence while attempting to catch a home run ball hit by Dick Green, one of only three home runs hit by Green during the season. He missed the remainder of the 1973 season and never regained his speed as the bones did not heal properly. Two days prior to the injury, Valentine was playing center field when Nolan Ryan threw his first career No-hitter. Valentine would later be Ryan's manager in Texas for his last two No-hitters (6th and 7th). In 1974, despite still recovering from his leg injury, Valentine made 414 plate appearances, the second most of his career, and batted .261 with three home runs. On April 4, 1975, the Angels loaned him to the Charleston Charlies, a AAA Pittsburgh Pirates organization where he played in 56 games before returning to the Angels organization on June 20, 1975. He was assigned to the Angels AAA affiliate Salt Lake City Bees and played in 46 games batting .306 before being called back up to the Angels On September 17, 1975, he was traded to the San Diego Padres with Rudy Meoli for Gary Ross. On September 19, 1975, in his first game as a Padre, Valentine homered off Mike Caldwell in a 3–1 loss to the Giants.

=== San Diego Padres/New York Mets (1976–1978) ===
In 1976, Valentine spent most of the season with Padres AAA affiliate, the Hawaii Islanders, playing in 120 games batting .304 with 13 home runs. On June 15, 1977, after playing 44 games with the Padres, he was part of the New York Mets infamous "Midnight Massacre", when the Mets traded Dave Kingman to San Diego for minor league pitcher Paul Siebert and Valentine, sent Tom Seaver to the Cincinnati Reds for Pat Zachry, Doug Flynn, Steve Henderson, and Dan Norman, and Mike Phillips to the St. Louis Cardinals for Joel Youngblood.

=== Seattle Mariners ===
Valentine's role with the Mets became even more limited, and he was released in spring training, 1979. He signed with the Seattle Mariners shortly afterwards, and made his debut as a catcher that season. Following the season, he retired from baseball at 29 years of age.

== Managerial career ==
=== Texas Rangers ===
Valentine was serving as a member of the Mets coaching staff when he was selected by the Texas Rangers to take over managing duties from Doug Rader 32 games into the 1985 season. The Rangers went 53–76 the rest of the season, finishing with an overall record of 62–99. In 1986 the Rangers finished second in the American League West with a record of 87–75, and Valentine finished second in voting for the AL Manager of the Year. The Rangers fell back into sixth place the following two seasons, and Valentine was fired by managing partner George W. Bush halfway through the 1992 season with a record of 45–41. Toby Harrah took over as manager, and led the Rangers to a 77–85 record and a fourth-place finish. Valentine finished his Rangers' managerial career with a record of 581 wins and 605 losses with no post–season appearances.

In 1989, while still managing the Rangers, Valentine worked as an on-the-field analyst for NBC's 1989 ALCS coverage alongside Bob Costas and Tony Kubek.

=== Norfolk Tides ===
In 1994, Valentine managed the Mets' Triple-A affiliate, the Norfolk Tides, to a 67–75 record, and finished fourth in the five-team West Division of the International League.

=== Chiba Lotte Marines ===
In 1995, Valentine began his first stint as manager of the Chiba Lotte Marines in the Japanese Pacific League. That season, the team surprised most Japanese baseball fans by finishing in second place (69–58–3); the Marines had not won the Japanese Pacific league pennant since 1974. However, he was fired abruptly due to a personal conflict with general manager Tatsuro Hirooka, despite having a two-year contract.

=== New York Mets ===
Valentine returned to the Norfolk Tides in 1996, managing them to an 82–59 record and second place in the International League's West Division. He then was promoted to manager of the Mets with 31 games left in the 1996 season, and led them to a 12–19 record the rest of the way.

Over the next two seasons, Valentine led a Mets resurgence, finishing 14 games over .500 (88–74) both years. In the 12th inning of a 14-inning marathon against the Toronto Blue Jays on June 9, 1999, Valentine was ejected by home plate umpire Randy Marsh for arguing a catcher's interference call against Mike Piazza. Valentine returned to the dugout an inning later disguised with sunglasses and a fake moustache made from eye black. The Mets went on to win the game 4–3, and Major League Baseball fined Valentine $5,000 and suspended him for two games.

Valentine led the Mets to a record of 97–66 and a wild card playoff berth that season. The Mets defeated the Arizona Diamondbacks in four games (3–1) en route to the National League Championship Series, where they eventually lost to their division rival the Atlanta Braves in six games (4–2).

In early 2000, Valentine allegedly mentioned to students at the University of Pennsylvania's Wharton School of Business somewhat cynical, insider comments regarding a handful of Mets players and the organization as a whole. The incident was called "The Whartongate Affair". That year Valentine returned as Mets manager, finishing with a 94–68 record and another wild card playoff berth. This time the Mets were successful in winning the National League pennant, defeating the St. Louis Cardinals in the 2000 National League Championship Series in five games (4–1). The Mets lost the 2000 World Series to their crosstown rivals the New York Yankees in five games (4–1).

On July 14, 2001, Valentine won his 1,000th game as manager, doing so against the Boston Red Sox in his 1,958th game as manager.

Valentine won the 2002 Branch Rickey Award for his donations and personal work with survivors of the September 11 attacks. Valentine had an uneasy, if not volatile relationship with general manager Steve Phillips, who fired three of Valentine's coaches at the end of one season and refused to discipline Rickey Henderson and Bobby Bonilla for their actions in 1999 (the two were seen playing cards during the end of the NLCS that year and the latter asked Valentine to a fight in the dugout). At one point, Phillips refused to let Valentine attend the winter meetings. At the end of the 2002 season, with owner Jeff Wilpon seeing no optimism for improvement in 2003, fired Valentine. Valentine described himself as a scapegoat and stated, "Nobody in this organization has done more for the community than I have. Steve Phillips has done nothing in the community. I went to his church for a father-son night, his church, and he was late."

He finished his Mets managerial career with a record of 536 wins and 467 losses.

=== Second stint with the Chiba Lotte Marines ===
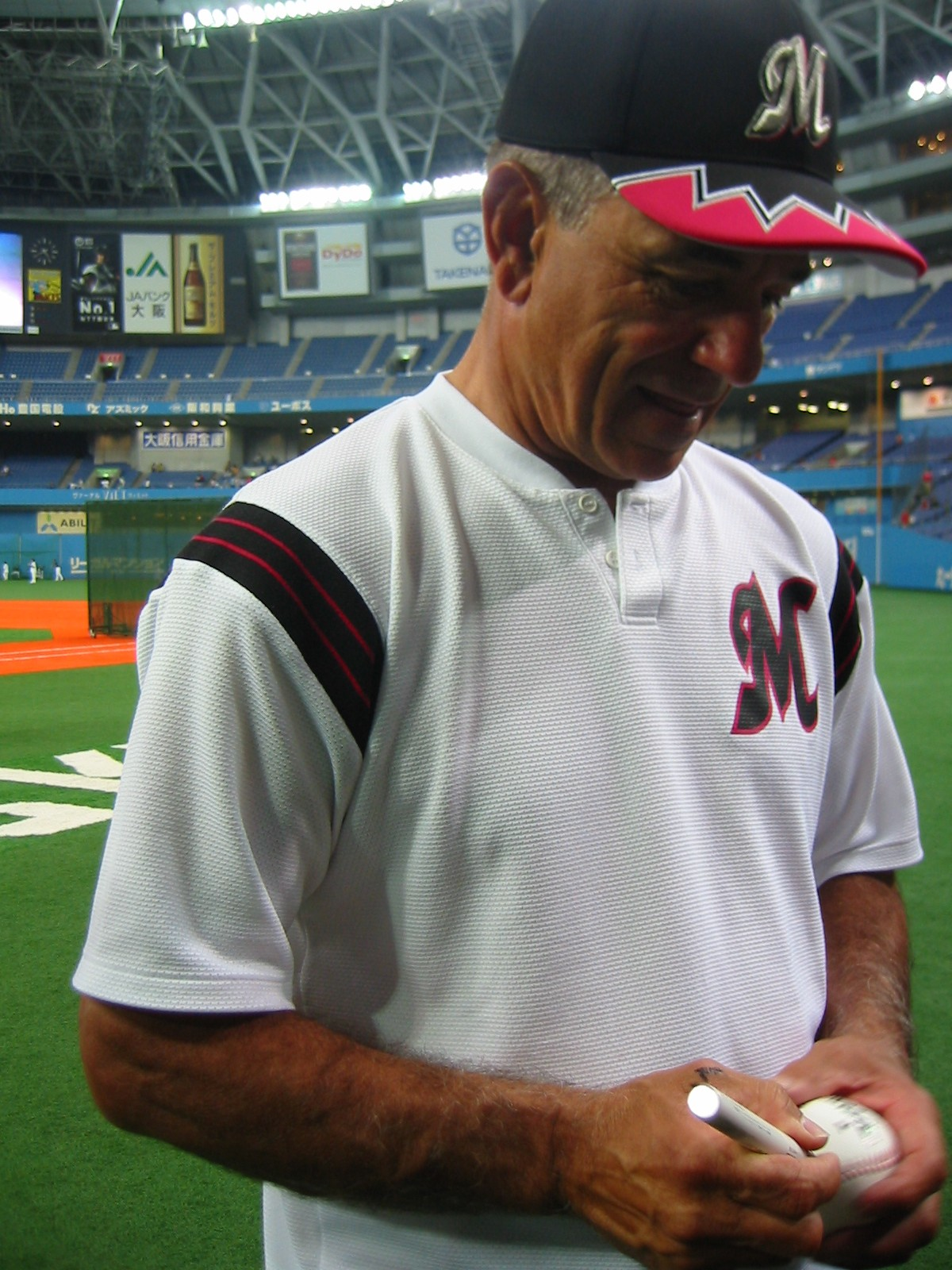
Valentine was popular with the Marines' fans

In 2004, Valentine rejoined the Chiba Lotte Marines as manager, and in 2005 led the Marines to their first Pacific League pennant since 1974 following a close playoff with the Fukuoka SoftBank Hawks. On October 26, 2005, the Marines won the Japan Series in a four-game sweep of the Hanshin Tigers. The next day Valentine issued a challenge to the World Series champion Chicago White Sox on behalf of the Marines, calling for a series to be played between the American and Japanese championship teams.

Following their Japan Series championship, the Marines won the inaugural Asia Series by defeating the Samsung Lions of the Korea Baseball Organization in November 2005. Valentine aided in bringing innovative promotions to Japan, which doubled Marine attendance during his tenure. Some of these gimmicks, like allowing children to run the bases after games or dedicated autograph sessions, are common in America but were unseen in Japan; others, such as Valentine hosting dance classes for female fans, played on the manager's personal appeal (and his history—Valentine was a competition ballroom dancer in his youth). In 2008, Valentine was the subject of the ESPN Films documentary The Zen of Bobby V., which followed Valentine and his 2007 Marines team. The Zen of Bobby V. was an official selection at the 2008 Tribeca Film Festival. The Marines let Valentine go after the 2009 season after an extensive smear campaign led by club president Ryuzo Setoyama, which ironically backfired and resulted in an overflow of support for Valentine by local fans. In the end, Valentine was fired, even though a petition to extend his contract was presented to the organization with 112,000 signatures. This would lead to several members of the Marines' then ōendan fan club, MVP, to be banned from Chiba Marine Stadium for life, as they wouldn't stop chanting obscenities at management to keep Valentine, which also led to MVP's disbandment after 2009.

=== ESPN ===
Valentine accepted a position as a baseball analyst for ESPN. He had previously appeared on the cable network's Baseball Tonight show in 2003. He made his broadcasting debut for the 2009 American and National League Championship Series and World Series.

In late 2009, Valentine was a candidate to replace Eric Wedge as manager of the Cleveland Indians. The position, however, went to Manny Acta.

Valentine continued working with ESPN for the 2010 MLB season. He was interviewed for the Baltimore Orioles managerial position after manager Dave Trembley was fired in early June; Valentine later withdrew his name from consideration. Valentine was considered a front runner for the Florida Marlins managerial position that opened after manager Fredi González was fired in late June. However, Valentine confirmed he was no longer a candidate for the position after Marlins owner Jeffrey Loria stated that Edwin Rodríguez, the interim manager they summoned to replace Gonzalez, would manage the team through the 2010 season. With the firing of the New York Mets manager Jerry Manuel at the end of the 2010 season, New York sports media speculated that Valentine would return to manage the team. It was also reported that the Toronto Blue Jays and Seattle Mariners had interviewed Valentine for their open managerial positions. Valentine was interviewed by the Milwaukee Brewers for their managerial opening in October 2010. He was believed to be a finalist along with Bob Melvin, Joey Cora, and Ron Roenicke. The Brewers job eventually went to Angels bench coach Ron Roenicke.

On December 1, 2010, Valentine, Orel Hershiser and Dan Shulman were named as ESPN's new Sunday Night Baseball crew for the 2011 MLB season. In June 2011, news outlets reported that Valentine was once again a candidate for the Florida Marlins managerial position after the ballclub free fell in the standings. That did not come to fruition, however, as the Marlins hired former White Sox manager Ozzie Guillén.

=== Boston Red Sox ===
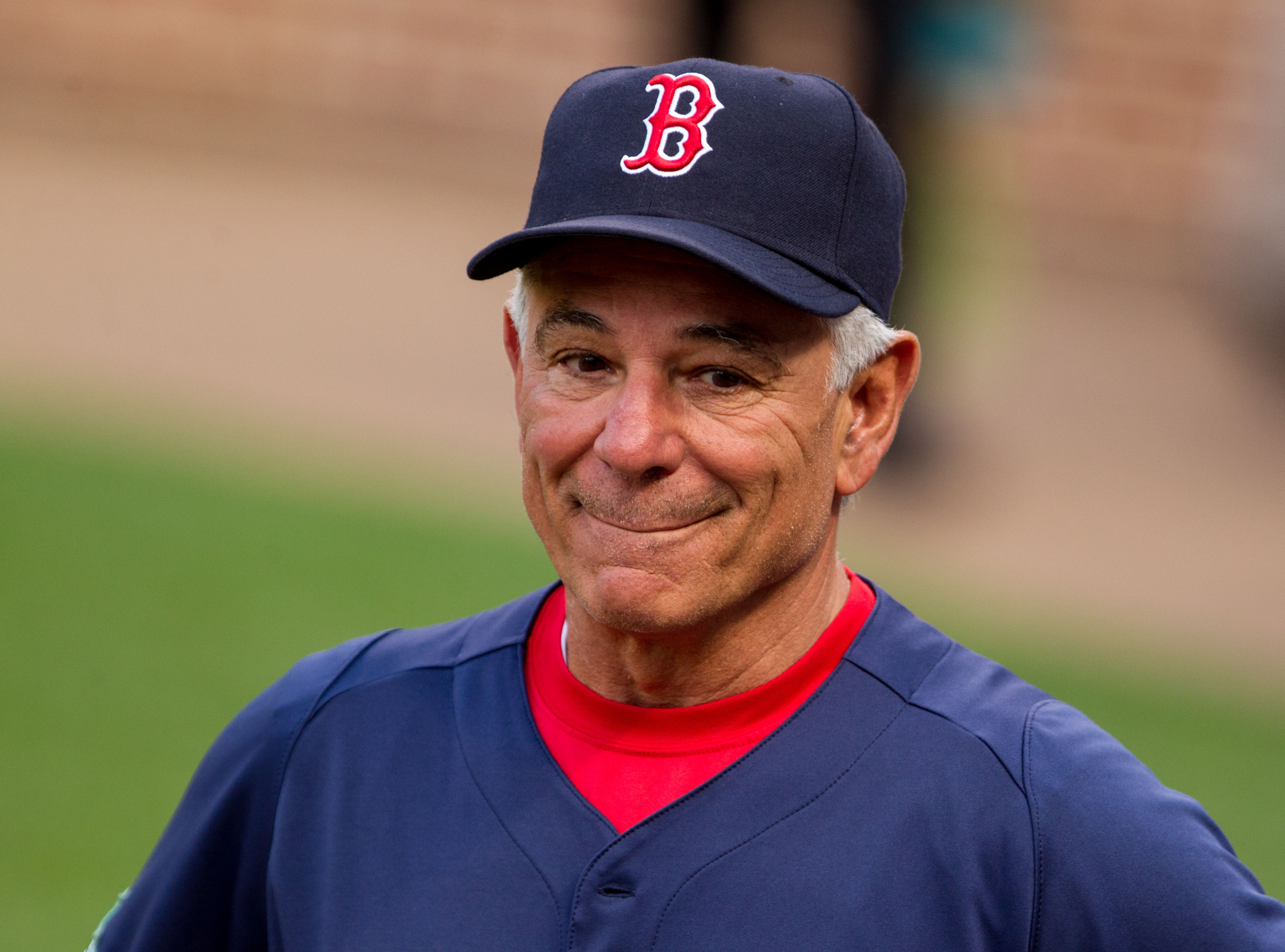
Valentine as the Red Sox skipper in 2012

On November 21, 2011, Bobby met with the Boston Red Sox for a formal interview for the open manager's position, and on November 29, it was reported that he would be the new Red Sox manager and the successor to Terry Francona. Valentine was introduced by Red Sox General Manager Ben Cherington on December 2, 2011, and chose to wear number 25 in honor of the late Tony Conigliaro, with whom he briefly roomed during spring training 1976 with the San Diego Padres.

Valentine's first and only season with Boston was marred by undermining from the front office, injuries, public feuds with players, run-ins with the media, and a tumultuous relationship with his coaches. Under Valentine's management, the 2012 Red Sox finished last in the AL East at 69–93, their worst record in 47 years. Valentine was fired by the Red Sox on October 4, 2012, one day after the conclusion of the regular season.

== Managerial record ==
As of November 21, 2014

Team	Year	Regular season					Postseason			
Team	Year	Games	Won	Lost	Win %	Finish	Won	Lost	Win %	Result
TEX	1985	129	53	76	.411	7th in AL West	–	–	–	–
TEX	1986	162	87	75	.537	2nd in AL West	–	–	–	–
TEX	1987	162	75	87	.463	6th in AL West	–	–	–	–
TEX	1988	161	70	91	.435	6th in AL West	–	–	–	–
TEX	1989	162	83	79	.512	4th in AL West	–	–	–	–
TEX	1990	162	83	79	.512	3rd in AL West	–	–	–	–
TEX	1991	162	85	77	.525	3rd in AL West	–	–	–	–
TEX	1992	86	45	41	.523	fired	–	–	–	–
TEX total		1186	581	605	.490		0	0	–	
NYM	1996	31	12	19	.387	4th in NL East	–	–	–	–
NYM	1997	162	88	74	.543	3rd in NL East	–	–	–	–
NYM	1998	162	88	74	.543	2nd in NL East	–	–	–	–
NYM	1999	163	97	66	.595	2nd in NL East	5	5	.500	Lost NLCS (ATL)
NYM	2000	162	94	68	.580	2nd in NL East	8	6	.571	Lost World Series (NYY)
NYM	2001	162	82	80	.506	3rd in NL East	–	–	–	–
NYM	2002	161	75	86	.466	5th in NL East	–	–	–	–
NYM total		1,003	536	467	.534		13	11	.542	
BOS	2012	162	69	93	.426	5th in AL East	–	–	–	–
BOS total		162	69	93	.426		0	0	–	
Total		2,351	1,186	1,165	.504		13	11	.542	

== Sacred Heart University ==
Valentine took over as athletic director at Sacred Heart University in Fairfield, Connecticut, on July 1, 2013.

During his tenure Valentine helped to raise the visibility of Pioneer athletics, with appearances on ESPN, SNY and other national and regional media outlets. He oversaw the replacement of the playing surface on Campus Field, as well as its surrounding track, in addition to renovations to William H. Pitt Center. Sacred Heart University invested $21.8 million in the construction of the Bobby Valentine Health and Recreation Center, a 57,400-square foot, three-story, fitness facility for the whole student population, which includes an indoor track, a bowling center, an 18-bike spin center, a 45-foot climbing wall and exercise and weight-training rooms. The facility opened in August 2019.

In addition, the Pioneers won their NEC-best eighth Joan Martin Commissioner's Cup for excellence in women's athletics in 2015, and overall the Pioneers have captured 13 conference championships since he has taken the helm. Programs have garnered national acclaim in that time, with the football team finishing the 2014 season nationally ranked, and the fencing squad finishing 11th in the NCAA at the 2014 championship. In September 2016, Valentine was named the ECAC Division I Administrator of the Year. On June 8 2021, Valentine took a leave of absence from his position, with Judy Ann Riccio becoming the interim director. Three months later, Riccio was named the new athletics director.

== Awards and honors ==
- Elected to the Connecticut High School Coaches Hall of Fame (1986)
- New Jersey Sports Writers Association "Sports Humanitarian of the Year" (2001)
- Inducted into the New York Mets Hall of Fame on May 30, 2026

== Beyond baseball ==
Since 1980, Valentine has owned and operated Bobby V's Restaurant & Sports Bar, a sports bar that is located in his hometown of Stamford, with franchises slated to open in Norwalk, Connecticut, Arlington, Texas, and Middletown, Rhode Island.

In 2010, Valentine started the production company, Makuhari Media, with producing partner Andrew J. Muscato. The company produces sports themed documentaries.

In 2011, Mayor Michael Pavia named Valentine Director of Public Safety for the city of Stamford, Connecticut. Valentine was paid a token $10,000 salary for this position, which he pledged to donate to city charities. Valentine left the position 11 months later to manage the Red Sox.

In 2013, on the twelfth anniversary of the September 11 attacks, Valentine made comments that accused the New York Yankees of not contributing support to the New York community in the wake of the attacks. He was widely criticized for the inaccuracy of his comments, as many media sources documented several occasions on which the Yankees visited victims and workers after the attacks, and for the untimeliness of trying to take credit for helping. TBS had originally planned to feature Valentine as a studio analyst during its MLB on TBS coverage for the 2013 postseason, but reportedly declined to do so after the negative publicity his comments attracted.

On December 9, 2016, WEEI reported that, on the recommendation of New Jersey governor Chris Christie, Valentine was being considered by Donald Trump's presidential transition team for appointment as the United States Ambassador to Japan.

== 2021 Stamford mayoral election ==
On May 7, 2021, Valentine announced he was running for mayor of Stamford, Connecticut, in the 2021 election. He ran as an unaffiliated candidate.

He was challenged by Democratic state representative Caroline Simmons in the Stamford mayoral election that took place on Tuesday November 2, 2021.

Valentine lost the election to Simmons by 1,505 votes. With her election, Simmons became the first woman mayor of Stamford by taking 52.5% of the vote. Valentine obtained 47.5% of the vote. After the election, Valentine alleged voter fraud, which was disputed by Stamford's registrar of voters.

== Personal life ==
Valentine was married to Mary Branca, the daughter of former Brooklyn Dodgers pitcher Ralph Branca and together they have a son. They separated in 2011 and divorced in October 2021. He is currently in a relationship with a Japanese woman, Junko Ogino, whom he met in 1995 and became romantically involved with in 2007 while still married to Mary Branca.

== See also ==
- List of Major League Baseball managers with most career wins

Sporting positions
Preceded by Bud Harrelson	New York Mets first base coach 1983	Succeeded by Jim Frey
Preceded by Frank Howard	New York Mets third base coach 1983–1985	Succeeded by Bud Harrelson
Preceded by Clint Hurdle	Norfolk Tides manager 1993	Succeeded by Toby Harrah
Preceded by Toby Harrah	Norfolk Tides manager 1996	Succeeded by Bruce Benedict
