= Edwin L. Scofield =

American politician

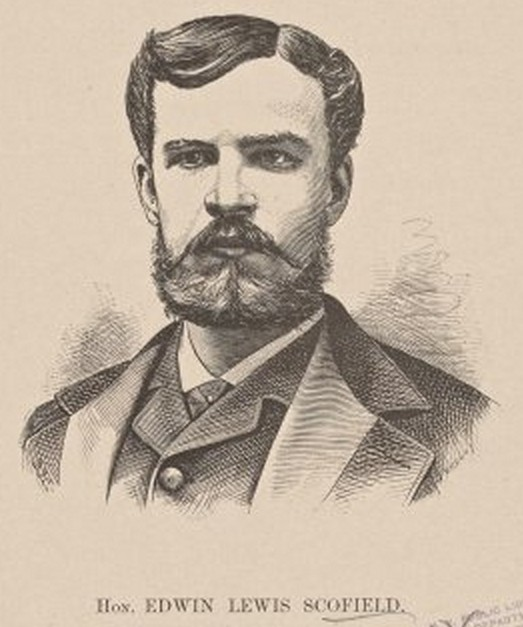

Member of the Connecticut House of Representatives from Stamford

Member of the Connecticut Senate from the 12th district
- In office 1883–1884
- Preceded by: Oliver Hoyt
- Succeeded by: R. Jay Walsh

2nd Mayor of Stamford, Connecticut
- In office May 6, 1895 – May 3, 1897
- Preceded by: Charles H. Leeds
- Succeeded by: William Bohannan

Personal details
- Born: Edwin Lewis Scofield; January 18, 1852 Stamford, Connecticut, US
- Died: January 14, 1918 (aged 65) Stamford, Connecticut, US
- Resting place: Woodland Cemetery, Stamford, Connecticut, US
- Spouse: Annie Weed Candee
- Education: Columbia Law School (1873)

Edwin Lewis Scofield (January 18, 1852 – January 14, 1918) was a member of the Connecticut Senate representing the 12th District from 1883 to 1884. He was the second mayor of Stamford, Connecticut, serving from 1895 to 1897.

He was born in Stamford. His parents were Erastus Ellsworth Scofield and Jane Ann (Brown) Scofield, both from Stamford.

On October 15, 1879, he married Annie Weed Candee, future sister-in-law of writer Helen Churchill Candee. They had a son, Edwin Lewis Scofield, Jr. (1887-1965).

Scofield graduated from Columbia Law School in 1873.

He was a director on the boards of Stamford Hospital, the Stamford YMCA, and the First National Bank of Stamford.

Preceded by Charles H. Leeds	Mayor of Stamford, Connecticut; May 6, 1895–May 3, 1897	Succeeded by William Bohannan
Connecticut House of Representatives
Preceded by	Member of the Connecticut House of Representatives from Stamford, Connecticut	Succeeded by
Connecticut State Senate
Preceded by Oliver Hoyt	Member of the Connecticut Senate from the 12th District; 1883–1884	Succeeded by R. Jay Walsh
