= Stamford Hospital =

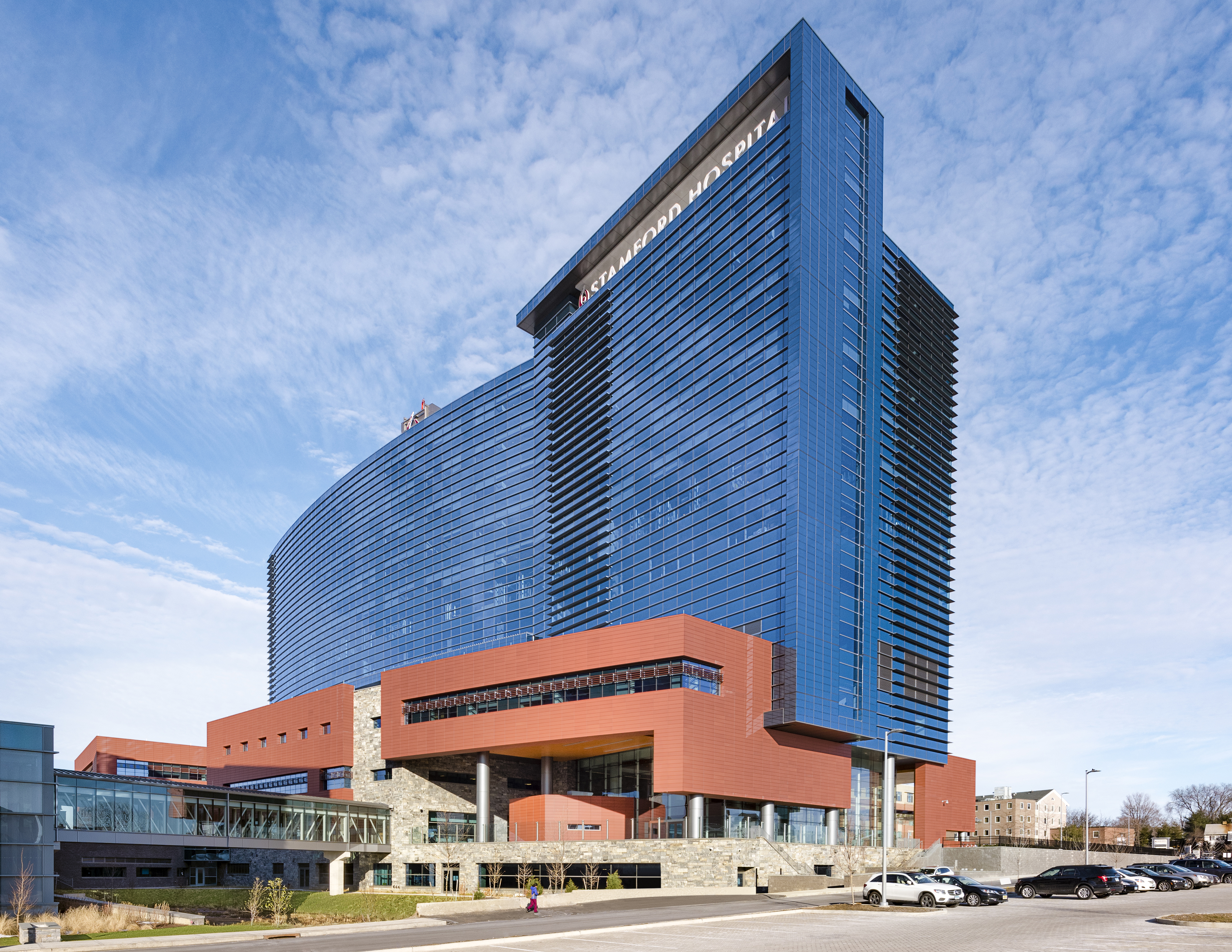
- Stamford Hospital

Geography
- Location: 1 Hospital Plaza, Stamford, Connecticut, United States
- Coordinates: 41°03′18″N 73°33′09″W

Organization
- Funding: Non-profit hospital
- Type: Community & Teaching
- Affiliated university: Columbia University Vagelos College of Physicians and Surgeons

Services
- Emergency department: Level II Trauma Center
- Beds: 305

Helipads
- Helipad: ICAO: US-5197

History
- Opened: 1896

Links
- Website: www.stamfordhealth.org
- Lists: Hospitals in Connecticut

Stamford Hospital, residing on the Bennett Medical Center campus, is a 305-bed, not-for-profit hospital and the central facility for Stamford Health. The hospital is the regional healthcare facility for Fairfield and Westchester counties, and is the only hospital in the city of Stamford, Connecticut.

Stamford Hospital is the largest teaching affiliate of the Columbia University Vagelos College of Physicians & Surgeons outside of NewYork-Presbyterian/Columbia University Irving Medical Center (NYP/CUIMC). The faculty at Stamford hospital have academic appointments from the university, as well as Columbia-affiliated physician residency training programs. Columbia medical students rotate through several departments at Stamford Hospital, including Primary Care, Family Medicine, Surgery, and Obstetrics & Gynecology.

As of 2005, Stamford Hospital had a total of 2,254 employees, making it one of the city's largest employers. A large segment are represented by the New England Health Care Employees Union, District 1199, affiliated with the Service Employees International Union.

== Founding and early history ==
Stamford Hospital was founded by Judge John Clason. Clason was also a farmer and served as a state legislator, town assessor and school board member. After consultation with Edwin L. Scofield, the second mayor of Stamford, regarding possible philanthropies, Clason sold some of his land for $45,000 to get the initial funding for the hospital. In giving the money, Clason's required that the new institution be named Stamford Hospital, be nonsectarian and not discriminate in receiving patients. The hospital opened with 30 beds on May 7, 1896, in a mansion on East Main Street.

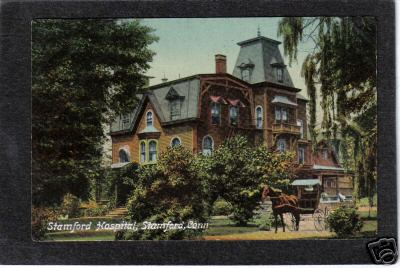
Stamford Hospital Postcard 1911

Edgar L. Geibel, chief administrator of the hospital from 1954 to 1977, oversaw growth of the hospital, specifically from 1966 to 1969, with the construction of the hospital's white pavilion wing designed by Perkins & Will.

In 1982 Philip D. Cusano was appointed president and chief executive officer. During his tenure the modern day Stamford Health System was created with the addition of a skilled nursing facility, professional medical office buildings, outpatient cancer center, ambulatory health centers, home care and hospice services and a continuing care retirement community. During Cusano's tenure Stamford Health System acquired the neighboring St. Joseph Medical Center and constructed the Tully Family Wellness Center on the former St. Joseph site. It was also during this time the SHS entered into a major teaching affiliation with the Columbia University College of Physicians and Surgeons.

From 1994 to 2000, the hospital had significant financial difficulties, but the hospital's finances began to improve under CEO Brian Grissler, with revenues in 2007 of $357 million.

In 2008, the hospital announced plans to expand its rooms and several departments. The expansion of the hospital, dubbed "New Stamford Hospital", resulted in an 11-story glass structure. The expansion was completed in late 2016 and cost approximately $575 million.

Stamford Health has expanded since 2010 with an affiliated medical staff called Stamford Health Medical Group. Also since 2010, Stamford Health has opened small outpatient clinical, laboratory and imaging facilities throughout Fairfield County and southwestern Connecticut.

== Facilities ==
Stamford Health's Bennett Medical Center is located in Stamford, Connecticut. The campus contains the main hospital and additional outpatient facilities. The hospital includes the new 11-story glass tower, as well as the original Perkins & Will and Whittingham pavilions. Adjoined to the main structure is the outpatient Bennett Cancer Center. The Tandet Center, previously a nursing home, is currently used for administrative purposes, including housing the affiliated Sacred Heart University physician assistant training program.

=== Bennett Cancer Center ===
Part of the Dana-Farber/Brigham and Women's Cancer Care Collaborative of Harvard, the Bennett Cancer Center provides comprehensive cancer care services within Stamford Health. The staff includes the full array of cancer care physicians, including Medical Oncology, Radiation Oncology, Surgical Oncology, Interventional Radiology/Oncology as well as ancillary specialists such as Geneticists. The facility participates in multiple ongoing scientific studies for researching advanced therapies for cancer. In early 2007 the hospital started a "Familial Colorectal Cancer Registry" for individuals and families with a history of colorectal or associated cancers, the first of its kind in Connecticut. It was named for longtime benefactors Carl and Dorothy Bennett.

=== Hospital for Special Surgery (HSS) ===
In 2018, Stamford Hospital and Hospital for Special Surgery opened a collaborative nursing unit and operating rooms within the main hospital, staffed by HSS orthopedic and sports medicine physicians. Additionally, HSS and Stamford Health staff collaborate at Stamford's Chelsea Piers facility, primarily for sports rehabilitation.

=== Cohen Children's Specialty Center at Stamford Hospital ===
An extensive pediatric ward within Stamford hospital, the Cohen Children's Center provides all branches of pediatric medicine, surgery and neonatal intensive care services. This works in concert with the hospital's dedicated pediatric emergency room, which is staffed by fellowship trained pediatric emergency physicians.

=== Tully Health Center ===
A satellite campus located a few miles northwest of the main hospital, the facility includes multiple health care services in an outpatient "medical mall" setting. Named after Daniel and Grace Tully, whose family who made a significant donation to The Campaign for Stamford Hospital, the center opened in the spring of 2002 after overhauling the formerly St. Josephs Hospital. The Patty and George Sarner Health & Fitness Institute is housed within and provides access for both rehabilitation and personal fitness.

=== Auxiliary sites ===
In addition to those listed above, Stamford hospital has several additional outpatient facilities scattered throughout southwestern Connecticut, largely imaging centers and clinical offices of the affiliated Stamford Health Medical Group (SHMG). These include HSS at Chelsea Piers, Darien Imaging Center, Darien Medical Center, Wilton Surgery Center, and Holly Hill Greenwich.

== Clinical services ==
The 305 bed Stamford Hospital and nearly 500 affiliated physicians provide patient care in all of the general medical specialties as well as the majority of subspecialties typically seen within a regional referral center.

Certified Level II Trauma Center, required emergency surgical subspecialty care is available, including Trauma surgery, Orthopedics, Neurosurgery, Vascular Surgery and Interventional Radiology.

Certified "Thrombectomy Capable" by The Joint Commission to treat acute stroke, with Interventional neuroradiology is available.

The hospital's focus has been to become a regionally respected center for Neurology/Stroke, Invasive and Non-invasive Cardiology/Cardiac Surgery and Orthopedics.

== Special programs ==
To amuse patients, some volunteers at the hospital roam the halls dressed up as clowns, calling themselves Health and Humor Associates (or "HAHA").

== Awards and recognition ==
In 2004, the Joint Commission awarded the annual Ernest A. Codman Award for creating a protocol to maintain correct blood glucose levels in critically ill patients. The new protocol cut the death rate among those patients by 29 percent and shortened time spent in the intensive care unit by 11 percent.

Stamford Hospital was awarded American Nurses Credentialing Center Award for Excellence in Nursing Services in 2005. Stamford Hospital was one of 168 hospitals in the country to receive the award.

In 2007 Ernst & Young LLP gave Brian Grissler, the hospital president, its Entrepreneur of the Year award in the "social enterprise" category.

In 2018, Stamford Hospital received Leadership in Energy and Environmental Design (LEED) Healthcare Certification.

== Alliances and partnerships ==
- The hospital is a major teaching affiliate of Columbia University College of Physicians and Surgeons, and is a clinical training site for Columbia medical students. In addition, Columbia serves as the umbrella institution governing Stamford Hospital's residency programs of Internal Medicine, Family Medicine, Obstetrics/Gynecology and General Surgery.
- The hospital is the clinical teaching site for the Sacred Heart University Physician Assistant program.
- The hospital is certified by Planetree International, an organization that pioneered a focus on patient-centered care.
- Stamford Health's Bennett Cancer Center is part of the Dana-Farber/Brigham and Women's Cancer Care Collaborative.

== See also ==
- List of hospitals in Connecticut
