= Mayor of Stamford, Connecticut =

Political office in the United States

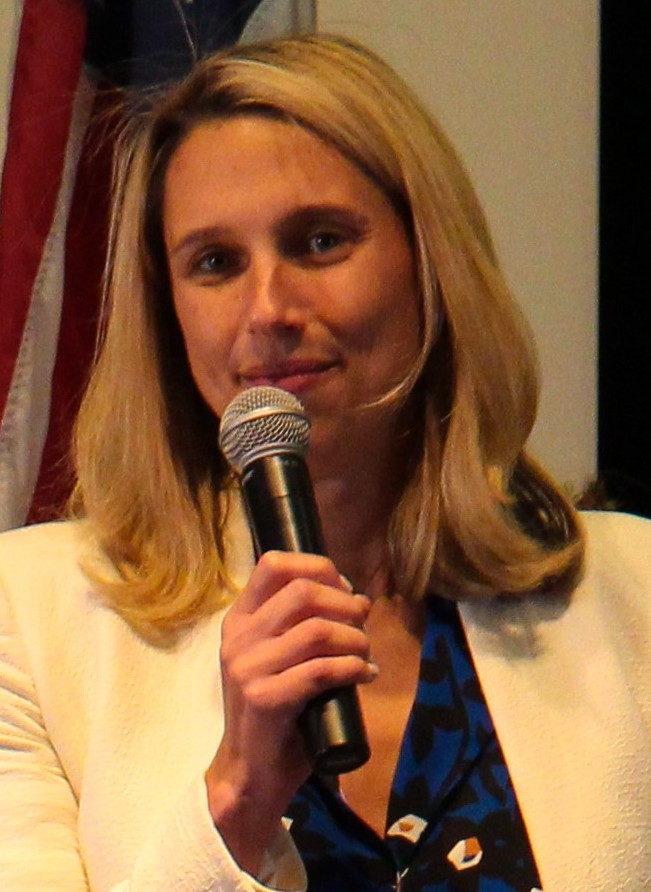
- Incumbent; Caroline Simmons since 2021
- Type: Mayor
- Term length: 4 years
- Formation: 1894
- First holder: Charles H. Leeds

The mayor of Stamford, Connecticut, United States, is the city's chief executive.

== History of the mayoralty ==
Before 1945, the city charter of the City of Stamford divided the city into two separate political jurisdictions: a central city with a "strong mayor" form of government and a town which employed the traditional town meeting form of government. From the 1930s, reformers began seeking to change this system on the grounds that it accorded too much power to the mayor and that the separation of the town and city for some purposes but not others "was an outmoded and inefficient way to govern a modern city."

In 1946, the Charter Consolidation Inquiry Commission, created by the Connecticut General Assembly, issued recommendations for Stamford government to unify under a single jurisdiction led by a strong mayor, and with a city council (called the Board of Representatives) of forty members, with two elected from twenty districts. These recommendations were approved by Stamford voters and the new system took effect on April 15, 1949.

Stamford retains its strong-mayor form of government today. The mayor appoints the departments heads, acts as chief executive officer of the city, and is responsible for presenting the budget to the board of finance, city council, and planning board. The city council approves the budget and passes ordinances and resolutions. Both the mayor and the city council serve four-year terms, and there are no term limits.

== List of mayors of Stamford ==
The following table lists the mayors of Stamford, as well as their dates in office, their dates of birth, and (if deceased) their dates of death.

Name	Served	Party	Date of birth	Date of death	Notes
Charles H. Leeds	1894-1895		January 9, 1834	November 6, 1914	
Edwin L. Scofield	1895-1897	Democrat	June 18, 1852	January 14, 1918	
William J. H. Bohannan	1897-1899	Democrat	March 9, 1865	August 29, 1947	
Edward J. Tupper	1899-1900		September 19, 1853	October 2, 1922	
Homer Stille Cummings	1900-1902	Democrat	April 30, 1870	September 10, 1956	
Charles H. Leeds	1902-1904	Democrat	January 6, 1873	February 7, 1967	
Homer Stille Cummings	1904-1906	Democrat	April 30, 1870	September 10, 1956	Subsequently Attorney General of the United States (1933-1939)
Edward J. Tupper	1906-1910	Republican	September 19, 1853	October 2, 1922	
Charles E. Rowell	1911-1913	Citizen's	May 3, 1849	March 29, 1914	
Walter G. Austin	1913-1915	Democrat, Progressive	December 9, 1853	January 14, 1937	
John M. Brown	1915-1915		November 7, 1856	December 10, 1915	
John J. Treat	1916-1922	Democrat	June 10, 1873	February 7, 1928	
Alfred N. Phillips, Jr.	1923-1924	Democrat	April 23, 1894	January 18, 1970	
John F. Keating	1924-1926	Republican	September 8, 1876	September 15, 1946	
Alfred N. Phillips, Jr.	1927-1928	Democrat	April 23, 1894	January 18, 1970	
William W. Graves	1928-1930	Republican	October 28, 1868	December 26, 1965	
Joseph P. Boyle	1930-1934	Democrat	1883	May 25, 1948	
John F. Keating	1934-1935		September 8, 1876	September 15, 1946	
Alfred N. Phillips, Jr.	1935-1936	Democrat	April 23, 1894	January 18, 1970	Subsequently representative from Connecticut's 4th congressional district
Edward A. Gonnoud	1936-1938	Democrat	September 12, 1892	June 26, 1951	
Charles E. Moore	1938-1940	Republican	June 29, 1884	June 22, 1967	
Edward A. Gonnoud	1940-1942	Democrat	September 12, 1892	June 26, 1951	
Charles E. Moore	1942-1949	Republican	June 29, 1884	June 22, 1967	
George T. Barrett	1949-1951	Republican	November 29, 1884	October 11, 1954	
Thomas F. J. Quigley	1951-1957	Democrat	April 19, 1903	November 9, 1996	
Webster C. Givens	1957-1959	Republican	December 23, 1898	September 7, 1968	
James Walter Kennedy	1959-1963	Democrat	June 8, 1912	June 26, 1977	Subsequently Commissioner of the NBA (1963–1975)
William F. Hickey Jr.	1963-1963	Democrat	May 28, 1929	July 21, 2016	
Thomas C. Mayers	1963-1967	Republican	March 21, 1909	December 20, 1997	
Bruno E. Giordano	1967-1969	Democrat	July 29, 1929	May 27, 2016	
Julius Morris Wilensky	1969-1973	Republican	October 10, 1916	October 25, 2004	
Frederick P. Lenz, Jr.	1973-1975	Democrat			
Louis A. Clapes	1975-1983	Republican	April 10, 1917	November 20, 1990	
Thom Serrani	1983-1991	Democrat	1948	—	
Stanley J. Esposito	1991-1995	Republican		—	
Dannel Patrick "Dan" Malloy	1995-2009	Democrat	July 21, 1955	—	Subsequently governor of Connecticut
Michael Pavia	2009-2013	Republican		—	
David R. Martin	2013–2021	Democrat	February 23, 1953	—	
Caroline Simmons	2021–Present	Democrat	February 10, 1986	—	First female mayor in Stamford history
