= David Martin (mayor) =

American politician (born 1953)

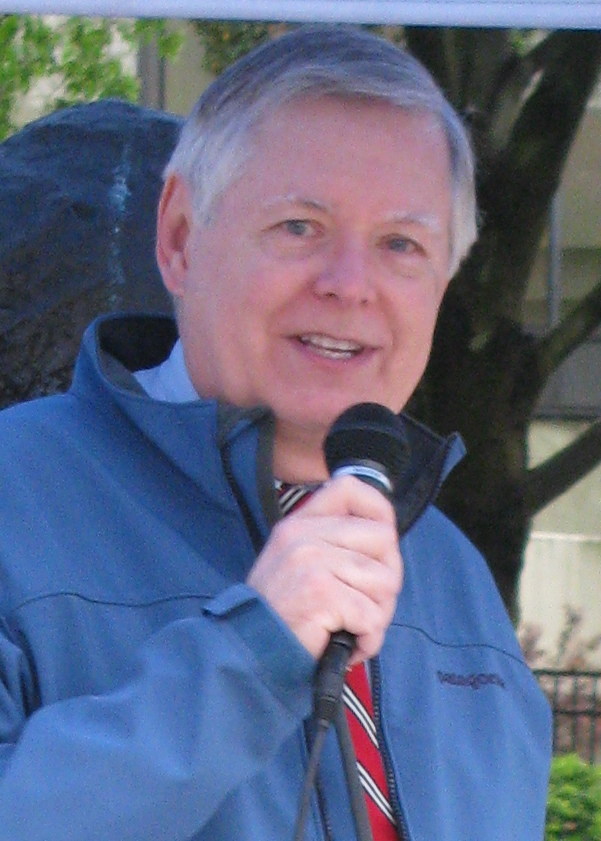

31st Mayor of Stamford
- In office December 1, 2013 – December 1, 2021
- Preceded by: Michael Pavia
- Succeeded by: Caroline Simmons

Personal details
- Born: February 23, 1953 (age 73) Kansas City, Missouri, U.S.
- Party: Democratic
- Education: Massachusetts Institute of Technology (BA, AB); Stanford University (MBA)

David R. Martin (born February 23, 1953) was the mayor of Stamford, Connecticut, from 2013 to 2021. A Democrat, he was elected Mayor of Stamford in November 2013 in a four-candidate race with approximately 48% of the vote. He was sworn in on December 1, 2013. He previously served as the President of the Stamford Board of Representatives (city council) and on the Stamford Board of Finance.

== Early life, career, and family ==
David Martin was born and raised just outside Kansas City, Missouri. His mother worked as a public school counselor, and his father was a lawyer and, later, a trial judge. In high school, Martin was selected as president of his school's National Honor Society chapter. Martin later attended Massachusetts Institute of Technology (MIT), where he received two BA degrees in Biology and Economics. He later earned an MBA from Stanford University in 1979.

Following graduation from MIT, Martin took a job working for the Congressional Budget Office in the national security division. After graduation from Stanford Business School, he took a job working for Conrail as a planning manager. He joined PepsiCo after moving to Stamford, CT. He moved to Stamford with his future wife Judy in 1981 and within a couple of years purchased a home in North Stamford, where they have lived ever since.

In the mid-1980s, Martin took a job at Michael Allen Company, a private consulting firm headquartered in Darien, Connecticut. Martin, who worked there until his election as Mayor, was Senior Partner and CFO and one of five partners at the company at the time.

Martin has two daughters, Rachel and Sarah, who are both graduates of Stamford Public Schools. His wife Judy left a career in corporate America to become a reading teacher at one of Stamford's elementary schools, where she worked since 2007 until the week of her death from cancer on November 10, 2016.

== Stamford Board of Representatives (1983-2009) ==
David Martin was elected to Stamford's Board of Representatives in 1983 on the promise of improving city services. During his time on the board, he helped persuade former Stamford mayor Louis Clapes to provide municipal waste services to the city's condominiums. A number of his fellow Representatives praised him for being a hard worker, and for being knowledgeable, whereas others noted he was not inclined to compromise, nor was he an engaging speaker.

== Mayor of Stamford (2013-2021) ==
In November 2013, David Martin defeated Republican contender Michael Fedele in a narrow election to become the mayor of Stamford.

=== Budget ===
For fiscal year 2020–2021, the city government approved a $589.5 million budget, which did not increase property taxes for the first time in 40 years, due to economic hardship from the COVID-19 pandemic.

The city boards approved a $525 million budget for the fiscal year 2015–2016, representing a 2.59% tax increase.

The city boards approved a $507.9 million budget for the fiscal year 2014–2015, representing a 2.87% tax increase over the prior year. In his four years in office the average tax increase has been 2.79%, somewhat lower than the prior administration which had a 2.86% average tax increase.

==== Pensions and benefits ====
In his 2015-2016 budget proposal, Martin asked for a $3.5 million increase in funds to fully fund pensions and benefits for retired city employees. Martin claimed that Stamford has never fully funded its pensions and benefits, and intended "to be the first mayor ever who fully funds the required pension contributions and retiree medical contributions". However, the city's pensions went only 83% funded in 2016, and the city accumulated $380 million in unfunded retiree benefits by 2017.

=== Street safety ===
In September 2014, the city launched The Stamford Street Smart Initiative, a citywide effort to improve road safety by cracking down on speeding, distracted driving, drunk driving, and jaywalking. The initiative is led by Martin, in collaboration with the Police Department, Operations Department, Stamford Public Schools, and community organizations. New crosswalk signs, road stanchions, and "no turn on red" backlit signs were installed throughout the City in November 2014. Following the rollout of the campaign, the Stamford Police Department was awarded a $50,000 grant from the National Highway Traffic Safety Administration to improve the enforcement of traffic laws.

With support from Martin, the Stamford Board of Representatives unanimously passed a Complete Streets Ordinance, making it the third city in Connecticut to do so.

In his 2015-16 budget request, Martin sought funds to synchronize the city's traffic lights.

In May 2015, Martin installed 20 bike hitches in downtown Stamford, as part of the city's Bike Parking Program.

=== Police Department ===
In February 2015, Martin announced plans to construct a new police headquarters to replace the existing building, which was built in 1955 and was found to contain asbestos. In his 2015, he proposed allocating $45 million to rebuild the building.

Martin announced his support for body-worn cameras in May 2015, and pledged to apply for federal grant funding from the Department of Justice.

=== Public education ===
Martin serves as a non-voting member of the city's Board of Education. Martin is the first mayor to regularly attend Board of Education meetings.

In September 2014, Martin approved the purchased of a 10.8-acre property for $9.75 million. The property is the former site of Sacred Heart Academy, and the Stamford campus for the Stanwich School. At the time of the purchase, Martin and education officials announced their hope to use the property to address overcrowding in the district's elementary schools. In 2016, the Strawberry Hill School, an extension of a larger magnet school, moved into the site, and has since expanded it.

=== Transportation ===
Martin urged the Connecticut State Senate in 2014 to help improve Metro-North's New Haven Line, citing it as an important factor influencing the future success of the city and region.

=== COVID-19 pandemic ===
On April 6, 2020, before any cases of COVID-19 were reported in Connecticut, Martin was the first state or city official to announce new protocols to limit the spread of the COVID-19 virus. He called it "an emergency situation." In addition to announcing new safety protocols for visitors to City of Stamford buildings and City employees, he also requested additional funding from the Board of Representatives to combat the epidemic.

By the end of April 2020, as the closest Connecticut city to New York City, Stamford had become the epicenter of the COVID-19 pandemic in Connecticut, and experienced around 1,000 cases. Using emergency powers Mayor ordered a number of restrictions, sometimes before similar restrictions were announced by the State of Connecticut. By late October 2020, the city had experienced what Martin called "the beginning of a second wave". In compliance with state guidelines, on October 29, 2020, Martin ordered new limitations in the number of people allowed in public spaces, businesses, and at various gatherings.

Stamford was the first to provide testing for City and nursing home employees and the first to provide "pop-up" testing for the general public. Martin redeployed employees to monitor parks and businesses for compliance with new state and local regulations. He expanded on-street outdoor dining for Stamford restaurants with the strEATeries program. In addition to frequent "reverse 911 calls," both in English and Spanish, providing information on testing and free mask giveaways. Martin began a live weekly streamed update on the state of the virus in Stamford, which then became bi-weekly in late 2021. In cooperation with the University of Connecticut, he readied the UConn Stamford student dorms (opened during his term as Mayor) for potential overflow of COVID patients from Stamford Hospital in early 2020. He formed partnerships with both Stamford Health and Community Health Centers to provide testing and open two mass vaccination sites. In addition, vaccination programs were conducted at numerous locations in the city including Building One Community, Bethel AME Church, Faith Tabernacle Church, Union Baptist Church, targeted low-income apartment buildings, and Stamford parks. Starting in 2021, the city of Stamford introduced a vaccination program for homebound residents. Martin credited the city's health and public safety departments, volunteers, and non-profit organizations for their assistance in reaching and vaccinating the diverse population in Stamford. As of March 2022, about three months after Martin's departure as mayor, Stamford had the highest vaccination rate of any city in Connecticut with a population of over 100,000, and the second-highest of any municipality with a population above 50,000, behind just West Hartford. Martin claimed that, based on statistical analysis, the city's actions and the high vaccination rate had reduced the number of cases in Stamford relative to other cities in Connecticut and had saved perhaps between 60 and 100 lives.

== Electoral history ==
=== 2013 Stamford mayoral election ===
Martin was elected in November 2013 with 48% of the vote, defeating the Republican candidate, Former Lieutenant Governor Michael Fedele, and petitioning candidates Kathleen Murphy and John Zito.

Before competing in the general election, Martin won in the Democratic primary against State Representative William Tong in September 2013 with 52% of the vote. The primary race was among the most closely contested in the State. Democratic Governor Dannel Malloy, a former Mayor of Stamford, endorsed Representative Tong in the Democratic primary race, drawing criticism from local Democratic Party and their chairman, who endorsed Martin. Martin campaigned vigorously for the nomination and focused on his experience in City Hall and his commitment to the city.

Martin was heavily outspent in both races and contributed nearly $100,000 to his campaign.

=== 2017 Stamford mayoral election ===
In November 2017, Martin was re-elected as mayor with 58.61% of the vote, defeating Republican candidate Barry Michelson, and petitioning candidate John Zito, who earned 34.66% and 6.73% of the vote, respectively.

Unlike the 2013 election, when Martin raised around $400,000, Martin only raised about $117,000 this election. Martin's main opponent, Michelson, raised about $43,000, and campaigned against what he perceived to be the rampant development of the city.

=== 2021 Stamford mayoral election ===
In February 2021, Martin announced his intention to run for re-election. Martin was challenged by State Representative Caroline Simmons. On July 25, Stamford's Democratic Party narrowly endorsed Simmons over Martin by a vote of 21 to 19. Martin collected the required signatures to challenge Simmons' endorsement in a primary, but after being heavily outspent by Simmons, Martin lost by almost a two-to-one margin. Following the primary result, Martin endorsed Simmons.

== Philanthropy ==
In 2008, David Martin and his wife, Judy, founded the nonprofit charity The Starfish Connection, which seeks to provide educational support for students from low-income families and help them enroll in higher education.
