= Mark Boughton =

American politician (born 1964)

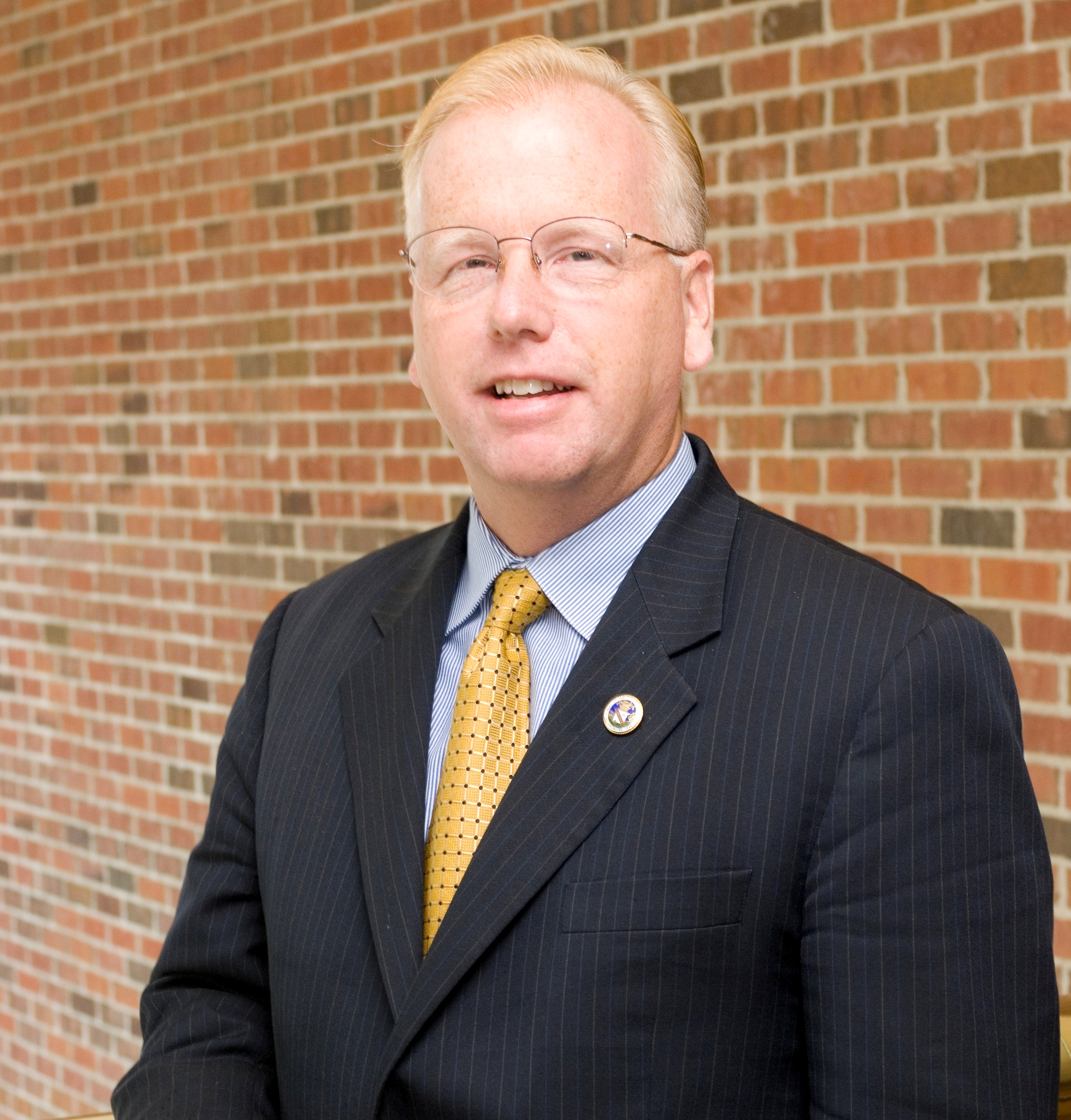
- Boughton in 2007

Commissioner of the Connecticut Department of Revenue Services
- Incumbent
- Assumed office February 24, 2021; Acting: December 18, 2020 - February 24, 2021
- Governor: Ned Lamont
- Preceded by: Scott Jackson

Mayor of Danbury
- In office January 1, 2002 – December 16, 2020
- Preceded by: Gene Eriquez
- Succeeded by: Joseph Cavo

Member of the Connecticut House of Representatives from the 138th district
- In office January 3, 1999 – January 1, 2002
- Preceded by: David Cappiello
- Succeeded by: Grace Scire

Personal details
- Born: February 20, 1964 (age 62) Danbury, Connecticut, U.S.
- Party: Republican
- Education: Central Connecticut State University (BS); Western Connecticut State University (MS)
- Website: Government website

Mark D. Boughton (born February 20, 1964) is an American politician who was the longest-serving mayor in Danbury, Connecticut's history. He served ten consecutive terms as mayor, from 2001 to 2020. He was the Republican endorsed candidate for governor of Connecticut in 2018, but lost the primary election to Bob Stefanowski. In 2020, Governor Ned Lamont nominated Boughton to serve as commissioner of the Connecticut Department of Revenue Services.

== Education ==
Born in Danbury, Connecticut, Boughton graduated from Danbury High School in 1982, after which he attended Central Connecticut State University, where he received a Bachelor of Science degree in education and American history. Boughton went on to receive a master's degree in educational psychology from Western Connecticut State University, where he was on the Alumni Board of Directors.

== Career ==
=== Early career ===
Boughton was in the United States Army Reserve from 1983 to 1989 where he achieved the rank of Sergeant. He began teaching Social Studies at Danbury High School in 1987. He was a member of the Danbury Planning Commission from 1995 to 1998. He began his political career as a State Representative for the 138th District of Connecticut in 1998. He was elected to a second term as a State Representative in 2000 before being elected mayor in 2001. Boughton achieved a perfect voting record in the General Assembly and was a member of the Education Committee and ranking member of the Environment Committee.

=== Mayor of Danbury ===
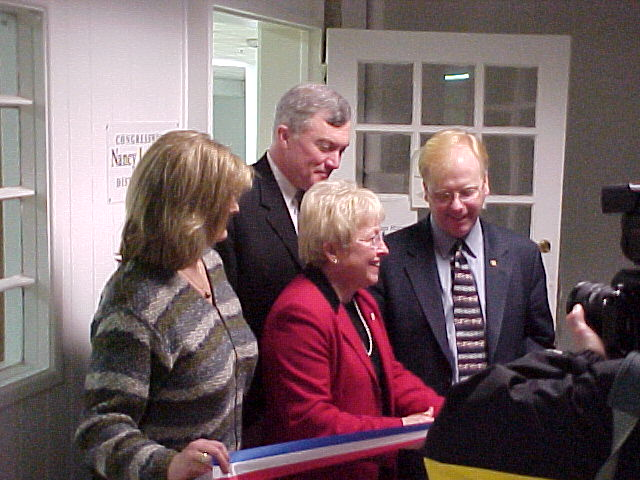
Boughton with Nancy Johnson, Barbara Henry, and Martin Foncello in 2003

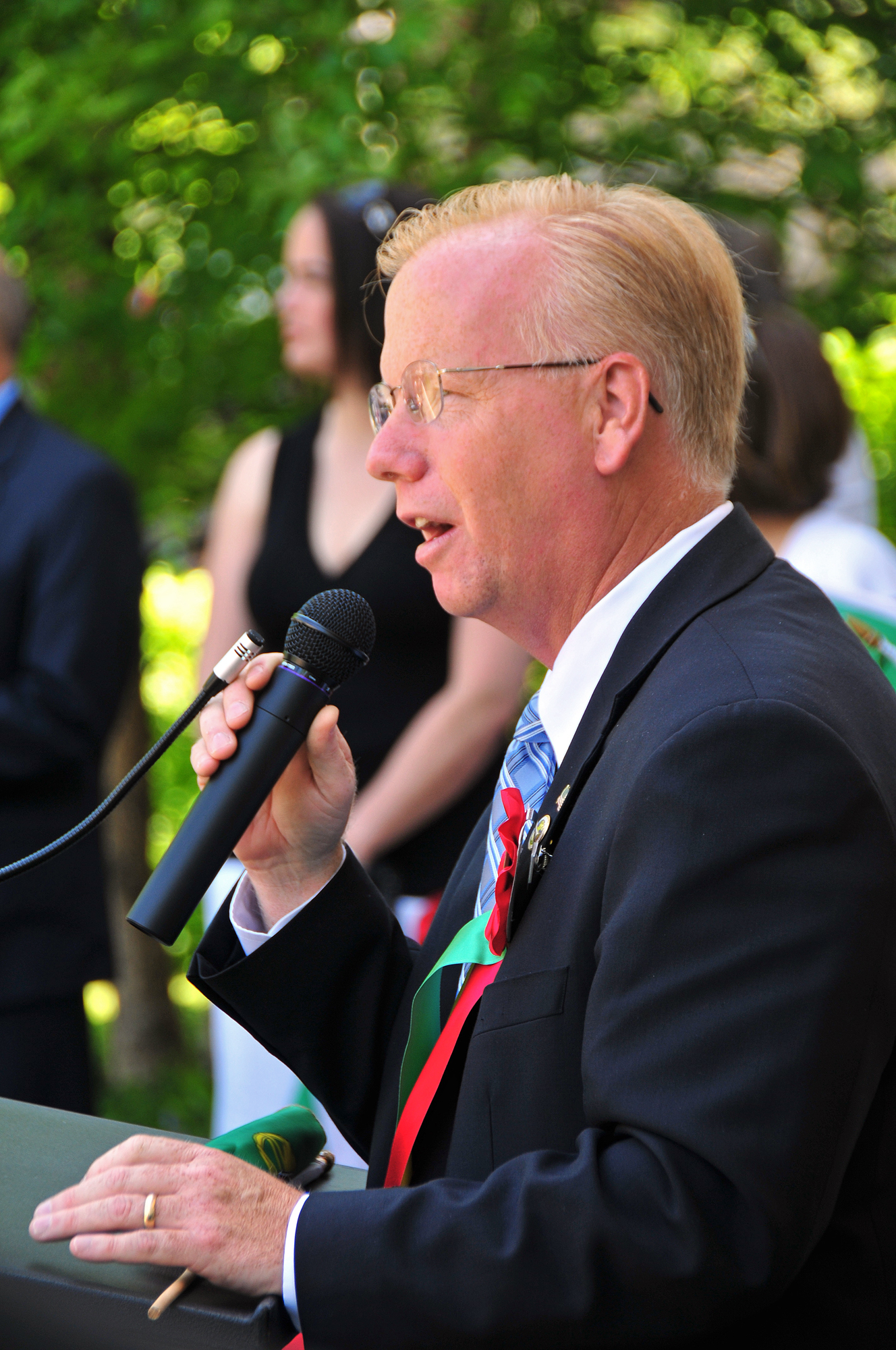
Boughton addresses a crowd outside Danbury Library in 2009

==== Mayors and Executives for Immigration Reform ====
On December 9, 2005, it was announced that Boughton and Suffolk County (NY) Executive Steve Levy were forming Mayors and Executives for Immigration Reform, a group that would lobby federal lawmakers to overhaul immigration laws.

==== The Danbury 11 ====
A case that would make national headlines and play out for over four years began on September 19, 2006, when eleven day laborers were arrested in Danbury. A sting operation had been set up where day laborers were lured into a van whose driver, posing as a contractor, promised them work. The laborers were driven to a parking lot where, if it was determined they were in the US illegally, initial reports indicated that they were arrested by agents of ICE. In interviews afterwards, Boughton stated that ICE had acted alone, and that the City of Danbury played no part in the arrests.

On Monday, February 4, 2008, Judge Michael Straus wrote in a public ruling that Danbury police did not exceed their authority during the undercover operation and that agents from the U.S. Immigration and Customs Enforcement did not rely on racial profiling to make the arrests.

On March 8, 2011, it was confirmed a settlement had been reached in the case, on the City's insurance carrier's recommendation, whereby Danbury agreed to pay the laborers $400,000 (Danbury's insurance carrier paid the settlement plus legal fees of close to $1,000,000, less a $100,000 deductible). (The federal government agreed to pay them $250,000.) As part of the settlement, the City did not admit any wrongdoing and there were no changes in the city's policies or procedures. "I know we were right," Boughton said. "If someone's civil rights were violated, as they allege, you wouldn't settle for a cash payment, but you would want some changes in policy."

==== City Line 311 ====
In his 2006 “State of the City” address, Mayor Boughton announced that Danbury would be joining 25 other cities in providing a free 311 service. On December 18, 2006, the service was launched and as of July 2015 City Line 311 is now 24/7.

==== Prescription Discount Cards ====
In January 2013, Mayor Boughton announced a program that allows residents to obtain savings on prescriptions that are not covered under their current insurance plans. Prescription Drug Discount Cards were sent in the mail to every Danbury resident and are available at City Hall. By 2014, 2,326 prescriptions were filled using the card saving Danbury residents over $151,600 in costs.

==== Clean Start ====
On May 23, 2016, the City of Danbury helped Jericho Partnership launch a homeless employment initiative called "Clean Start." The program's goal is to provide job coaching and employment mentoring to the homeless. Jericho volunteers oversee the displaced residents pick up litter throughout the city. Each day after a number of work hours, the workers are paid with gift cards.

==== Citizens Government Academy ====
In an effort to improve transparency and to give citizens an opportunity to learn about the functions of municipal government, Mayor Boughton launched the Citizens Government Academy. Throughout the course of the academy, students will hear from Mayor Boughton and will receive presentations from department heads to gain a better understanding of what each department does. Students also go on tours of the Danbury Police and Fire departments, the Public Works Facility, and the Danbury Museum and Historical Society.

==== Sewage treatment plant ====
On 22 August 2020, Mayor Boughton announced he was renaming the sewage treatment plant in Danbury to the "John Oliver Memorial Sewage Treatment Plant", after television presenter John Oliver after Oliver attacked Danbury on his previous show. Afterwards, Boughton said the offer was "in jest," and that he was not "really gonna name the sewer plant after John Oliver," to which Oliver responded by offering $55,000 to charities in Danbury if Boughton followed through and named the plant after him.

On 8 October 2020, the Danbury City Council voted 18-1 to rename the sewer plant after John Oliver.

=== Gubernatorial primaries ===
In 2010, after a failed attempt to gain the Connecticut Republican gubernatorial nomination, Boughton aligned with incumbent Lt. Governor Michael Fedele to run as his lieutenant governor. In the primary election, however, Tom Foley defeated Fedele for the party's nomination for governor while Boughton won his bid for lieutenant governor. The resultant Foley-Boughton ticket lost the general election to Democrats Dannel Malloy and Nancy Wyman by 6,404 votes (0.56%) out of 1.15 million votes cast.

For the 2014 election, Boughton kicked off his campaign for governor in January teamed with Heather Somers, former mayor of the Town of Groton, for lieutenant governor. Shortly after the Republican convention, Somers announced she would run for lieutenant governor solo and withdrew from the partnership with Boughton. Boughton then moved to Shelton Mayor Mark Lauretti as a running mate, but it turned out there was not enough time for Lauretti to get the signatures of 8,190 registered Republican voters in order to petition his way onto the primary ballot. Without a running mate to pool his campaign funds with, Boughton was unable to collect the $250,000 in donations required to qualify for public campaign financing. He withdrew from the race in June.

In November 2016, Boughton formed an exploratory committee to run for governor in 2018. On January 9, 2018, he announced he would run for governor. On May 12, he won the Republican endorsement for governor at the State Republican Convention in the third round of balloting. In the August 14 Republican primary, he lost the gubernatorial race to Bob Stefanowski.

=== Commissioner of the Connecticut Department of Revenue Services ===
On December 10, 2020, Governor Ned Lamont nominated Boughton to serve as commissioner of the Connecticut Department of Revenue Services to succeed Acting Commissioner John Biello.

== Awards and accolades ==
- 2016 – Received U.S. Conference of Mayors “Small Business Advocacy Award” for his support of small business in the city.
- 2016 – Mayor Boughton held the elected position of President to the Connecticut Conference of Municipalities.
- 2015 – Received the Prescott Bush Award from the Connecticut Republican Party.
- 2013 – Business Insider list of "15 Politicians Who Are Killing It On Twitter"

== Personal life ==
Boughton was born February 20, 1964, in Danbury to Rae (Linstrum) and Donald W. Boughton. His father was a city councilman in Danbury, and also was Danbury's mayor and a Connecticut State Representative (109th District).

He and his wife Phyllis divorced in 2016 after 19 years of marriage.

== Electoral history ==
2001
Party	Candidate	Votes	%	±%
Democratic	Christopher C. Setaro	7,176	48.80%	
Republican	Mark D. Boughton	7,303	49.75%	Republican gain
Independent	Thomas E. Bennett	213	1.45%	

2003
Party	Candidate	Votes	%	±%
Democratic	Thomas J. Arconti	5,592	38.61%	
Republican	Mark D. Boughton	8,776	60.60%	Republican hold
Independent	Alexander Nahas	115	0.79%	

2005
Party	Candidate	Votes	%	±%
Democratic	Dean E. Esposito	5,803	41.97%	
Republican	Mark D. Boughton	8,022	58.03%	Republican hold

2007
Party	Candidate	Votes	%	±%
Democratic	Helena M. Abrantes	4,453	33.34%	
Republican	Mark D. Boughton	8,718	65.27%	Republican hold
Concerned Citizens	John J. McGowan III	186	1.39%	

2009
Party	Candidate	Votes	%	±%
Democratic	Gary M. Goncalves	4,365	34.17%	
Republican	Mark D. Boughton	8,409	65.83%	Republican hold

2011
Party	Candidate	Votes	%	±%
Democratic	Lynn Taborsak	3,458	28.81%	
Republican	Mark D. Boughton	8,546	71.19%	Republican hold

2013
Party	Candidate	Votes	%	±%
Democratic	Paul McAllister	3,285	29.64%	
Republican	Mark D. Boughton	7,797	70.36%	Republican hold

2015
Party	Candidate	Votes	%	±%
Republican	Mark D. Boughton	5,486	88.10%	Republican hold
Independent	Mark D. Boughton	741	11.90%	

2017
Party	Candidate	Votes	%	±%
Democratic	Al Almeida	4,475	36.52%	
Republican	Mark D. Boughton	7,779	63.48%	Republican hold

2019
Party	Candidate	Votes	%	±%
Democratic	Christopher C. Setaro	7372	46.16%	
Republican	Mark D. Boughton	8598	53.84%	Republican hold

Party political offices
Preceded by Michael Fedele	Republican nominee for Lieutenant Governor of Connecticut; 2010	Succeeded by Heather Somers
