= Oak Investment Partners =

American private equity firm

- Type: Private Equity Investment Firm
- Industry: Private equity
- Founded: 1978; 48 years ago
- Headquarters: Greenwich, Connecticut, United States
- Area served: Norwalk, Connecticut; Minneapolis; Palo Alto, California
- Products: Venture capital
- Website: www.oakvc.com

Oak Investment Partners is a private equity firm focusing on venture capital investments in companies developing communications systems, information technology, new Internet media, healthcare services, and retail.

== History ==
The firm, founded in 1978 by Edward Glassmeyer and Stewart Greenfield, is based in Greenwich, Connecticut, with offices in Norwalk, Connecticut, Minneapolis and Palo Alto, California. As of 2015, Oak said it had invested $9 billion in more than 500 companies since 1978. Ann Lamont is a managing partner.

In May 2006, Oak raised its 12th fund, at $2.56 billion, reportedly the largest venture capital fund ever raised.

In 2015, Indian-born employee Iftikar Ahmed was sued by the U.S. Securities and Exchange Commission on suspicion of stealing US$65 million from the firm. Ahmed fled to India. In August 2015, Fortune reported that Mr. Ahmed had been detained in an Indian prison from May 22 until July 23 and that his passport had been confiscated.
