= Grace Scire =

American politician

Member of the Connecticut House of Representatives from the 138th district
- In office 2002–2003
- Preceded by: Mark Boughton
- Succeeded by: Janice Giegler

Personal details
- Party: Democratic

Grace Scire is an American politician who served in the Connecticut House of Representatives from 2002 to 2003, representing the 138th district as a Democrat. Scire was elected in a January 2002 special election to succeed Mark Boughton, who had been elected mayor of Danbury, Connecticut. She won by a margin of two votes. Scire ran for election to a full term in November 2002, but was defeated by Republican candidate Janice Giegler.
