= James H. Page =

American business and academic executive

Chancellor of the University of Maine system
- In office 2012–2019
- Preceded by: Richard Pattenaude
- Succeeded by: Dannel Malloy

James H. Page is an American businessperson and former Chancellor of the University of Maine System. Page, who was born in Caribou, Maine attended the University of Maine at Fort Kent, the University of St Andrews in St Andrews, Scotland and the Massachusetts Institute of Technology. Page became the first Chancellor of the University of Maine system to be born in Maine or attend a school in the system when he was appointed in 2012. While visiting the University of Maine in Orono, Maine prior to his appointment, Page argued in favor of shrinking the role of the Chancellor's office. He is the former CEO of James W. Sewall Company, a national consulting firm based in Old Town, Maine which was established in 1880. It focuses on forestry, natural resources, civil and spatial engineering. He had previously been an adjunct faculty member of the University of Maine.
