= Michael Ferguson (Connecticut politician) =

American politician

Member of the Connecticut House of Representatives from the 138th district
- In office 2017–2019
- Preceded by: Janice Giegler
- Succeeded by: Ken Gucker

Personal details
- Party: Republican
- Education: Western Connecticut State University

Michael Ferguson is an American Republican politician who served as a member of the Connecticut House of Representatives from the 138th district, which encompasses parts of Danbury, New Fairfield, and Ridgefield, from 2017 to 2019.

Ferguson was first elected in 2016 over Democrat Jeff Tomchik. Ferguson was defeated in an upset victory by Democratic challenger Ken Gucker in 2018. He lost by just under 200 votes. Ferguson served as a member of both the Transportation Committee and the Education Committee while in the house.
