= Rachel Chaleski =

American politician

Member of the Connecticut House of Representatives from the 138th district
- In office January 4, 2023 – January 8, 2025
- Preceded by: Ken Gucker
- Succeeded by: Ken Gucker

Personal details
- Born: Warwick, Rhode Island, U.S.
- Party: Republican
- Education: Concordia College (BS)

Rachel Chaleski is an American politician who served the Connecticut House of Representatives representing the 138th district from 2023 to 2025. The district is composed of the northwest section of Danbury.
