= Cathy Malloy =

Former First Lady of Connecticut

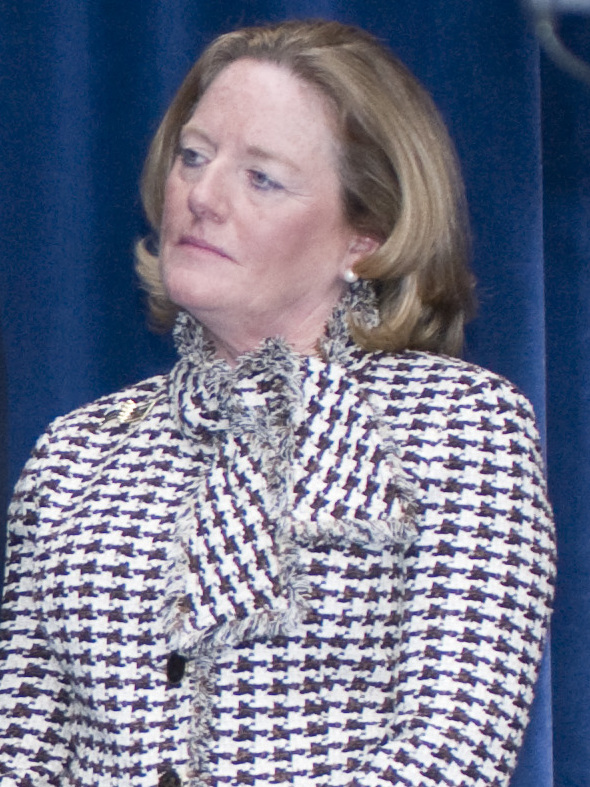
- Malloy in 2011

First Lady of Connecticut
- In role January 5, 2011 – January 9, 2019
- Preceded by: Lou Rell (first gentlemen)
- Succeeded by: Ann Lamont

Personal details
- Born: Catherine Frances Lambert; April 1, 1955 (age 71) Boston, Massachusetts, U.S.
- Party: Democratic
- Spouse: Dannel Malloy (m. 1982)
- Children: 3
- Education: Boston College (BS)
- Occupation: Business executive

Catherine Frances Malloy (née Lambert; born April 1, 1955) is an American executive and former First Lady of Connecticut between 2011 and 2019. She is married to former Governor of Connecticut Dannel Malloy.

== Early life and education ==
Malloy was born on April 1, 1955, in Boston, Massachusetts, to Matthew J. Lambert, Jr. and Frances (née Nagle) Lambert. Her father was a marketing executive and held several positions in the field. Most prominently he was an executive with the McDonald's Corporation and a close associate of founder Ray Kroc. Malloy holds a Bachelor of Science in psychology from Boston University.

== Career ==
Malloy primarily worked as an executive in the field of marketing, business development and campaign related work. Between 1996 and 1999, she was a vice president for Greenwich United Way in Greenwich, Connecticut. Then she became a marketing director for The Taubman Company where she led the marketing of Stamford Town Center. Between 2001 and 2011, Malloy was an executive director for The Center for Sexual Assault Crisis Counseling and Education in Stamford. Since 2011, she had been chief executive officer of the Greater Hartford Arts Council. She resigned from this position in 2020.

== Personal life ==
On September 25, 1982, she married Dannel P. Malloy. They have three sons; Dannel, Ben and Sam. The couple resides in Essex, Connecticut.
