= Janice Giegler =

American politician

Member of the Connecticut House of Representatives from the 138th district
- In office 2003–2017
- Preceded by: Grace Scire
- Succeeded by: Michael Ferguson

Personal details
- Born: South Salem, New York, U.S.
- Party: Republican
- Spouse: Tom
- Children: 1
- Education: Green Mountain College (AA); Ohio State University (BA)
- Profession: Politician

Janice R. "Jan" Giegler is an American Republican politician who served in the Connecticut House of Representatives from 2003 to 2017, representing the 138th district. She was first elected in 2002. She retired in 2016.

Connecticut House of Representatives
Preceded by Grace M. Scire	Member of the Connecticut House of Representatives from the 138th district 2003–2017	Succeeded by Michael Ferguson
