= Connecticut's 138th House of Representatives district =

American legislative district

Connecticut's 138th State House of Representatives district
Representative
Ken Gucker; D

Connecticut's 138th House of Representatives district elects one member of the Connecticut House of Representatives. Its current representative is Ken Gucker.

== List of representatives ==
Representative	Party	Years	District home	Note
Terry McGovern	Democratic	1967–1971	Bridgeport	
Ernest Nickols	Republican	1971–1973	Bridgeport	Redistricted to the 130th District
E. Ronald Bard	Republican	1973–1975	Norwalk	Redistricted from the 145th District
Lawrence Anastasia	Democratic	1975–1993	Norwalk	
Mark Nielsen	Republican	1993–1995	Danbury	
David Cappiello	Republican	1995–1999	Danbury	
Mark Boughton	Republican	1999–2002	Danbury	Elected Mayor of Danbury in 2001
Grace Scire	Democratic	2002–2003	Danbury	
Janice Giegler	Republican	2003–2017	Danbury	
Michael Ferguson	Republican	2017–2019	Danbury	
Ken Gucker	Democratic	2019–2023	Danbury	Lost reelection.
Rachel Chaleski	Republican	2023–2025	Danbury	
Ken Gucker	Democratic	2025–present	Danbury	

== Recent election results ==
=== 2022 ===
2022 Connecticut State House of Representatives election, 138th District
Party	Candidate	Votes	%
Democratic	Kenneth Gucker (incumbent)	3,322	49.81
Republican	Rachel Chaleski	3,219	48.26
Independent Party	Rachel Chaleski	129	1.93
Total votes		6,670	100.00
Republican gain from Democratic			

=== 2020 ===
2020 Connecticut State House of Representatives election, District 138
Party	Candidate	Votes	%
Democratic	Kenneth Gucker (incumbent)	6,530	51.48
Republican	Emile Buzaid	5,582	44.00
Working Families	Kenneth Gucker (incumbent)	302	2.38
Independent Party	Emile Buzaid	271	2.14
Total votes		12,685	100.00
Democratic hold			

== See also ==
- List of members of the Connecticut General Assembly from Norwalk
