= John Oliver Memorial Sewer Plant =

Sewage treatment plant in Danbury, Connecticut, US

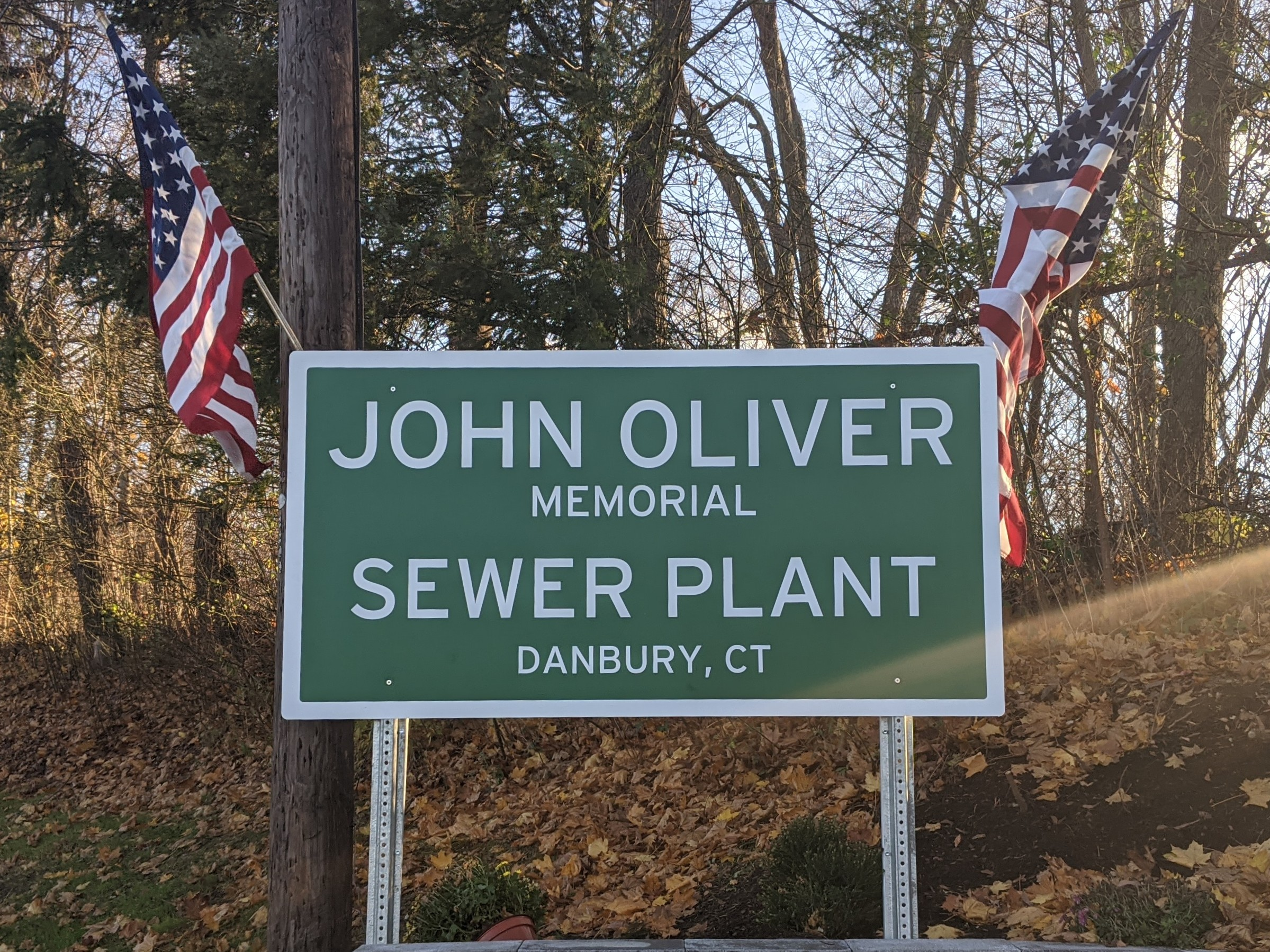
- Sign at the John Oliver Memorial Sewer Plant
- Country: United States
- Location: Danbury, Connecticut, U.S.
- Coordinates: 41°24′09″N 73°25′03″W
- Status: Operational
- Construction began: 2019
- Commission date: October 2020
- Construction cost: $103.3 million
- Owner: Danbury City Council

The John Oliver Memorial Sewer Plant is a sewage treatment plant in Danbury, Connecticut, named after the English-American comedian and political satirist John Oliver. The plant was completely renovated in response to a 2008 order from state and federal agencies to address the inability of the existing sewage system to curtail phosphorus concentrations in wastewater, as well as other environmental issues. After Oliver made fun of Danbury on his show, Last Week Tonight, Danbury mayor Mark Boughton responded by offering to rename their $100-million sewage plant for Oliver. Boughton later told reporters that it was a joke, but after Oliver offered $55,000 to local charities in exchange for the plant's renaming, the city agreed to officially rename the site in his honor. Construction began in 2019, and was finished in October 2020, with Oliver personally attending the ribbon-cutting ceremony.

== History and function ==
The reconstruction of the plant resulted from a 2008 order from the Connecticut Department of Energy and Environmental Protection, ordering Danbury, Connecticut, and around a dozen other Connecticut municipalities to upgrade their waste treatment facilities. The order specified that 98 percent of phosphorus in water leaving the plant must be removed; at the time, Danbury's sewage system only removed 90 percent of phosphorus. The municipalities contested the order, but their efforts were unsuccessful.

In November 2017, Danbury agreed to pay $100,000 for a violation of the Clean Water Act, after a lawsuit from the Connecticut Fund for the Environment alleged that Danbury had allowed over 45,000 US gallons (170,000 L; 37,000 imp gal) of untreated sewage to flow into local streams, including the Still River. Danbury mayor Mark Boughton blamed the release of the sewage on heavy storms that overwhelmed the existing wastewater infrastructure, and mentioned that plans were already underway for the sewage plant to help rectify the issue.

Following the finalization of the order to build the plant in 2018, the Danbury City council considered a referendum to approve the use of funds necessary to begin construction, estimating the cost at $102 million. City officials warned, however, that construction would have to proceed whether the referendum was passed or not, since the city was ordered to build the plants. They further warned that if the referendum did not pass, the city would lose out on opportune contracts and miss deadlines, both of which would increase the cost. The referendum was eventually put on the ballot by the city council and approved by the voters. It was initially thought to be a two- to three-year project; Antonio Iadarola, Danbury's public works director, said that construction would be delayed by six to eight months while contracts were drawn up, with construction expected to begin in Spring 2019. Boughton also proposed a "Regional Water Pollution Control Authority" to help administer construction and maintenance of the plant instead of the city council. He also stated that this would be in line with other municipalities and states that have done the same. The plant was reopened in October 2020, marking the completion of the factory's most significant overhaul in nearly twenty years.

A major overhaul of the sewage plant—including a major upgrade of its facilities and vehicle fleet—cost $103 million for the 2019–20 fiscal year. The sewage fund represented over 80 percent of the city's $127 million municipal budget that year. 20 percent of the plant's total cost was covered by Connecticut, and other 20 percent was paid for by customers in neighboring municipalities who benefit. Customers of the sewer, which made up less than a quarter of Danbury's population, saw rate increases of 2.95 percent, with Boughton commenting that he expected this trend to continue as the plant was constructed. In addition to phosphorus removal and other water treatment services, the sewage plant's upgrade plans included a technology to harvest grease and other heating fuel from wastewater. According to The News-Times, the plant is expected to produce 250,000 US gallons (950,000 L) of fuel through this process, saving the city $300,000 per year.

=== Name ===
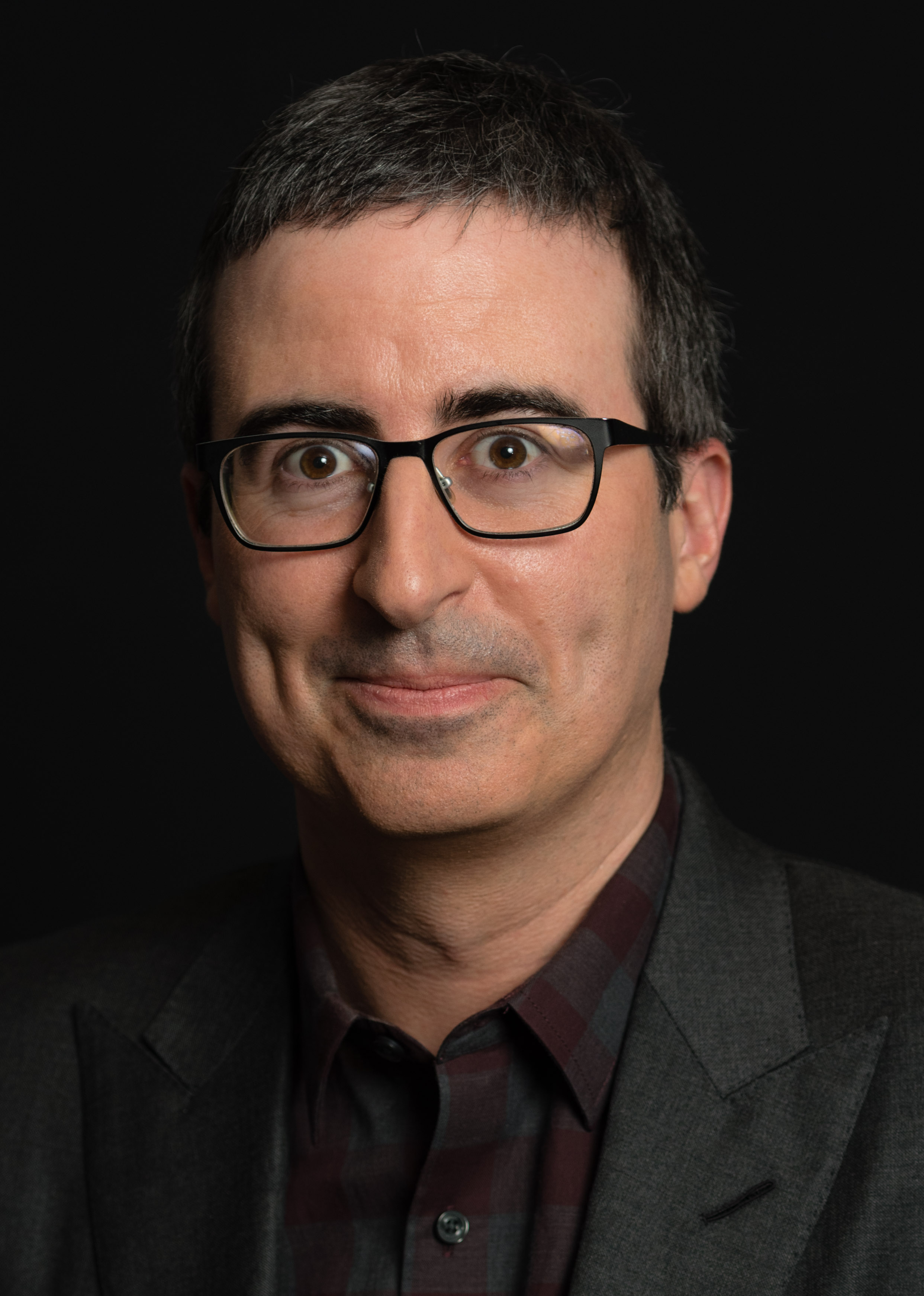
John Oliver in 2016

On August 16, 2020, John Oliver, a comedian and satirist, went on a diatribe on his television program Last Week Tonight with John Oliver, while airing a segment on jury selection in the United States, to satirize the city of Danbury. Oliver was discussing computer errors in a Connecticut jury selection system that caused it to ignore Hartford and New Britain in jury selection when he remarked: "If you're going to forget a town in Connecticut, why not forget Danbury? Because, and this is true, fuck Danbury!" While Oliver mentioned the Danbury Railway Museum and Hearthstone Castle in his segment, referring to the former as "charming", he further declared that "Danbury, Connecticut, can eat my whole ass". It is unclear why Oliver chose to single out Danbury for mention.

Danbury citizens responded to Oliver's segment, with the city's hockey team Danbury Hat Tricks referring to Oliver tongue-in-cheek as an "intrepid, serious reporter" and proceeding to poke fun at his roles in The Smurfs, Wonder Park and The Love Guru on their YouTube channel. In addition, Boughton announced on Facebook that the city would be renaming their sewage plant the "John Oliver Memorial Sewer Plant", explaining that "it's full of crap, just like you, John".

Oliver responded positively to the proposed name change on his show, but then aired a clip of the mayor telling reporters that he was joking and did not actually intend to rename the sewer plant, and proceeded to further insult Boughton and Danbury, remarking: "You had the first good idea in your city's history and you chicken out on the follow-through. What a classic Danbury move." Oliver ended the segment by offering $55,000 to local Connecticut charities, including $25,000 to the Connecticut Food Bank, in exchange for the plant being renamed after him. If Danbury declined the offer, Oliver threatened to donate the same amount to neighboring towns, including Waterbury, Milford, and Torrington. On September 6, Boughton said that he would accept Oliver's offer, on the condition that Oliver be physically present upon the sewer plant's opening ceremony, which featured a ribbon cutting. On October 9, Danbury's city council voted 18–1 (with one abstention) to rename the plant after Oliver. On October 18, Oliver aired a segment on his show in which he gave a speech at the opening ceremony of the John Oliver Memorial Sewer Plant wearing a makeshift hazmat suit:

This place takes the worst that humanity can produce, and transforms it into something that we can live with. And now more than ever, there's something inspirational in that, because at the end of this awful, awful year, what could be more important than evidence that, if we want to, we can come together, overcome our differences and sort our shit out.
