= 2010 Connecticut gubernatorial election =

- November 2, 2010
- Turnout: 57.45% (▼2.42%)
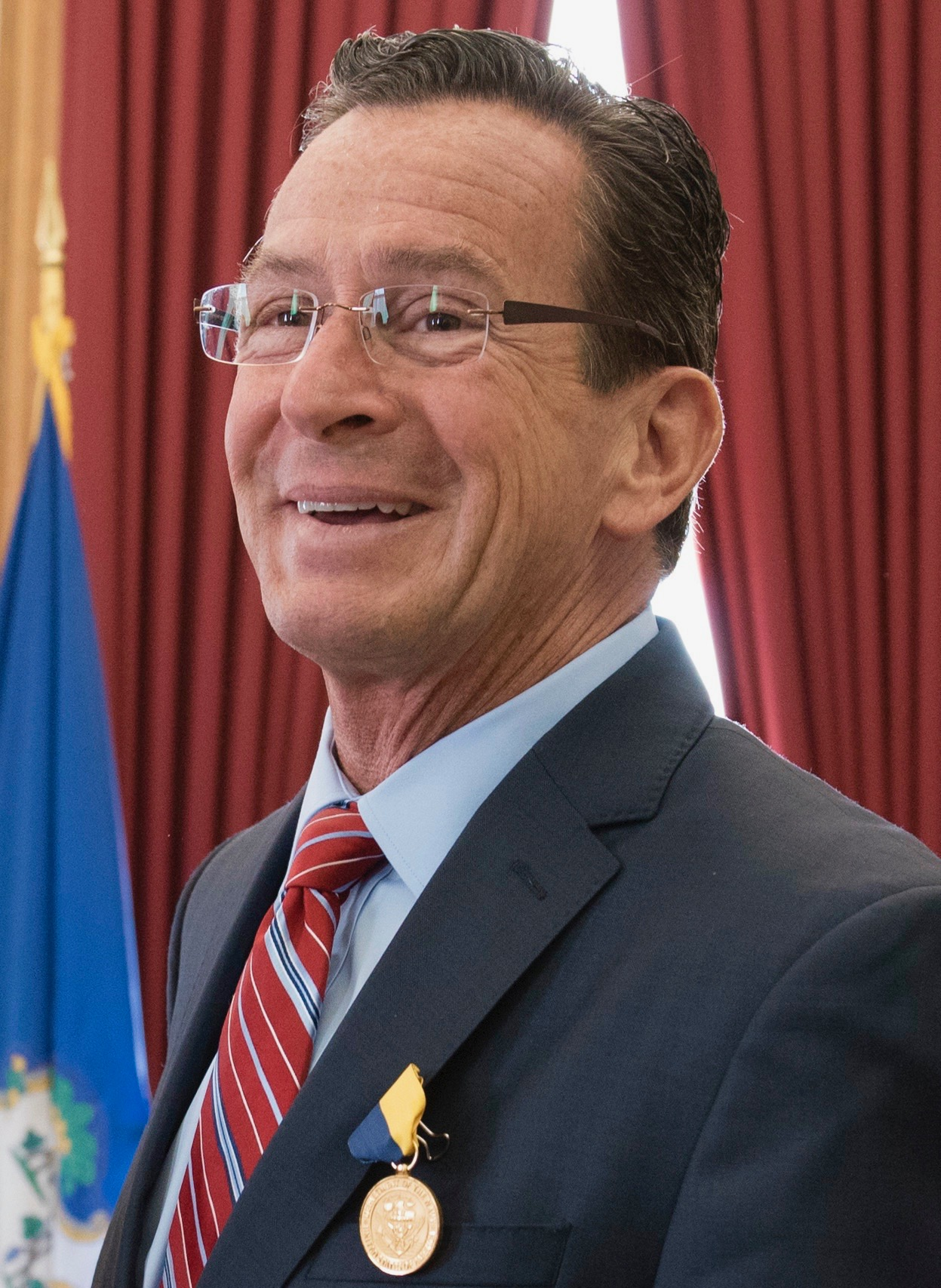

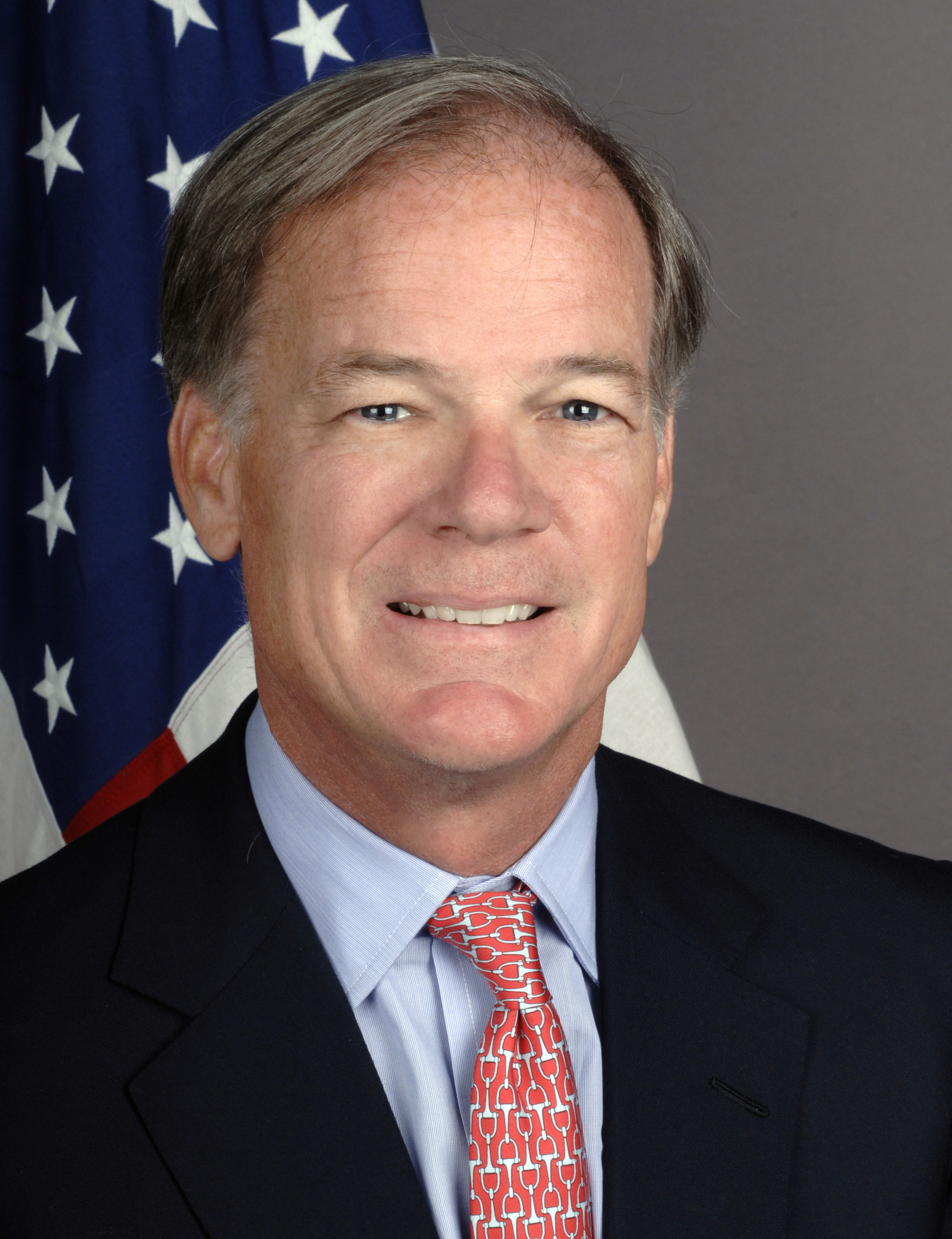
| Nominee | Dannel Malloy | Thomas C. Foley |
| Party | Democratic | Republican |
| Alliance | Working Families |
| Running mate | Nancy Wyman | Mark Boughton |
| Popular vote | 567,278 | 560,874 |
| Percentage | 49.51% | 48.95% |
- Malloy: 40–50% 50–60% 60–70% 70–80% 80–90% Foley: 40–50% 50–60% 60–70%
Governor before election
Jodi Rell
Republican
Elected Governor
Dannel Malloy
Democratic

The 2010 Connecticut gubernatorial election took place on November 2, 2010, to elect the 88th Governor of Connecticut. Incumbent Republican Governor Jodi Rell had announced in a press conference in Hartford on November 9, 2009, that she would not seek re-election in 2010. The sites Cook Political Report and CQ Politics both rated the election as a toss-up. This was the first open seat gubernatorial election in the state since 1994. As of 2026, this is the last time the Governor's office in Connecticut changed partisan control.

Gubernatorial primaries for the Republican and Democratic parties took place on August 10, 2010. The Democratic nominee, former Stamford Mayor Dan Malloy, narrowly won the general election, defeating Republican Thomas C. Foley. Foley conceded the race on November 8, 2010. Malloy became the first Democrat to be elected governor of Connecticut since 1986. With a margin of 0.7%, this election was also the second-closest race of the 2010 gubernatorial election cycle, behind only the election in Minnesota. As of 2026, this was the last time the Republican candidate won the counties of Fairfield and New London in a statewide election. Malloy was re-elected Governor in 2014 in a rematch with Foley.

== Republican primary ==
=== Candidates ===
- Michael Fedele, incumbent lieutenant governor
- Thomas C. Foley, former United States Ambassador to Ireland
- Oz Griebel, president and CEO of the MetroHartford Alliance

=== Declined ===
- Jodi Rell, incumbent governor
- Kevin J. O'Connor, former U.S. Attorney for the District of Connecticut
- Lawrence F. "Larry" Cafero, State House Republican Leader
- Chris Shays, former U.S. Representative
- John P. McKinney, State Senate Republican Leader
- Jeff Wright, mayor of Newington—ran for state treasurer
- Mark Boughton, mayor of Danbury—ran for lieutenant governor
- Lawrence J. DeNardis, former U.S. Representative from Connecticut's 3rd congressional district

=== Campaign ===
==== State convention results ====
The state Republican convention endorsed Tom Foley for governor on May 22, 2010.

State Republican Convention results
| Party | Candidate | Votes | % |
|---|---|---|---|
| Republican | Thomas C. Foley * | 710 | 50.68 |
| Republican | Michael Fedele * | 427 | 30.48 |
| Republican | Oz Griebel * | 243 | 17.34 |
| Republican | Lawrence DeNardis | 16 | 1.14 |
| Republican | C. Duffy Acevedo | 5 | 0.36 |
| Total votes | | 1,401 | 100.00 |

* Denotes candidate met the minimum threshold of 15 percent to appear on the primary ballot

=== Polling ===
| Poll source | Dates administered | Thomas C. Foley | Michael Fedele | Oz Griebel | Mark Boughton | Larry DeNardis |
|---|---|---|---|---|---|---|
| Quinnipiac | August 3–8, 2010 | 38% | 30% | 17% | — | — |
| Quinnipiac | July 28 – August 2, 2010 | 41% | 26% | 13% | — | — |
| Quinnipiac | July 7–13, 2010 | 48% | 13% | 7% | — | — |
| Quinnipiac | June 2–8, 2010 | 39% | 12% | 2% | — | — |
| Quinnipiac | May 24–25, 2010 | 37% | 11% | 5% | — | — |
| Quinnipiac | March 9–15, 2010 | 30% | 4% | 2% | 4% | 2% |
| Quinnipiac | January 14–19, 2010 | 17% | 8% | 2% | 6% | 4% |

=== Results ===
Results by county: Foley—40–50% Fedele—40–50%

In the Republican primary, state party-endorsed candidate Tom Foley, former U.S. Ambassador to Ireland, defeated incumbent Lieutenant Governor Michael Fedele.

Republican primary results
| Party | Candidate | Votes | % |
|---|---|---|---|
| Republican | Thomas C. Foley | 50,792 | 42.27 |
| Republican | Michael Fedele | 46,989 | 39.10 |
| Republican | Oz Griebel | 22,390 | 18.63 |
| Total votes | | 120,171 | 100.00 |

== Democratic primary ==
=== Candidates ===
- Ned Lamont, businessman and 2006 Democratic nominee for U.S. Senate
- Dannel Malloy, former mayor of Stamford and candidate in 2006

=== Declined ===
- James A. Amann, former speaker of the Connecticut House of Representatives
- Richard Blumenthal, Connecticut Attorney General
- Susan Bysiewicz, Connecticut Secretary of State
- Juan Figueroa, Universal Health Care Foundation of Connecticut president and former state legislator
- Mary Glassman, Simsbury first selectman and former Democratic nominee for lieutenant governor (ran for Lieutenant Governor of Connecticut instead)
- Michael Jarjura, mayor of Waterbury
- Gary LeBeau, state senator
- Rudy Marconi, Ridgefield first selectman (endorsed Lamont)
- Donald E. "Don" Williams, Jr., president of the Connecticut Senate – endorsed Lamont

=== Campaign ===
==== State convention results ====
The state Democratic convention endorsed Dan Malloy for governor on May 22, 2010.

State Democratic Convention results
| Party | Candidate | Votes | % |
|---|---|---|---|
| Democratic | Dannel Malloy * | 1,232 | 67.91 |
| Democratic | Ned Lamont * | 582 | 32.08 |
| Total votes | | 1,814 | 100.00 |

* Denotes candidate met the minimum threshold of 15 percent to appear on the primary ballot

=== Polling ===
| Poll source | Dates administered | Susan Bysiewicz | Ned Lamont | Dannel Malloy | Jim Amann | Mary Glassman | Rudy Marconi |
|---|---|---|---|---|---|---|---|
| Quinnipiac | August 3–8, 2010 | — | 45% | 42% | — | — | — |
| Quinnipiac | July 28 – August 2, 2010 | — | 45% | 40% | — | — | — |
| Quinnipiac | July 7–13, 2010 | — | 46% | 37% | — | — | — |
| Quinnipiac | June 2–8, 2010 | — | 39% | 22% | — | — | — |
| Quinnipiac | May 24–25, 2010 | — | 41% | 24% | — | — | — |
| Quinnipiac | March 9–15, 2010 | — | 28% | 18% | — | 4% | 2% |
| Quinnipiac | January 14–19, 2010 | — | 27% | 11% | 5% | 4% | 1% |
| Quinnipiac | November 3–8, 2009 | 26% | 23% | 9% | 3% | — | 1% |
| Quinnipiac | February 5–8, 2009 | 44% | — | 12% | 4% | — | — |

=== Results ===
Results by county: Malloy—60–70% Malloy—50–60%

In the Democratic primary, state party-endorsed candidate Dan Malloy, former mayor of Stamford, defeated businessman Ned Lamont.

Democratic primary results
| Party | Candidate | Votes | % |
|---|---|---|---|
| Democratic | Dannel Malloy | 103,154 | 57.01 |
| Democratic | Ned Lamont | 77,772 | 42.99 |
| Total votes | | 180,926 | 100.00 |

== General election ==
In Connecticut, candidates for governor and lieutenant governor are elected jointly on the same ballot line in the general election. In party primaries, however, they are nominated separately. Gubernatorial candidates often select an individual to be their preferred running mate prior to any such primaries, but their running mate in the general election is ultimately at the will of their party's primary electorate.

Prior to the state conventions and primaries, three gubernatorial candidates announced who they would wish to run with if so nominated to run for governor:

- Democrat Ned Lamont selected Simsbury First Selectwoman Mary Glassman to be his running mate on May 3.
- Democrat Dannel Malloy selected state comptroller Nancy Wyman to be his running mate on May 11.
- Republican Michael Fedele selected Danbury Mayor Mark Boughton, previously a fellow GOP candidate for governor, to be his running mate on May 17.

Additionally, one Republican, Lisa Wilson-Foley, ran for lieutenant governor without having been selected as a running mate by a gubernatorial candidate.

Prior to the Republican convention, Republican gubernatorial candidate Tom Foley decided not to name a running mate, stating that he believes that the state's tradition of a gubernatorial candidate naming a preferred running mate before party conventions and primaries is "out of date." While never named a preferred running for mate himself, Foley gave praise to both Michael Fedele's choice, Mark Boughton, and Lisa Wilson-Foley (of no relation).

At their respective party conventions, Boughton and Wyman won their party's endorsements on May 22, though both went on to face primary challenges. In the party primaries held on August 10, both party-endorsed candidates won, with Boughton defeating Wilson-Foley for the GOP nomination and Wyman winning the Democratic nod over Glassman.

The death penalty disagreement between Foley and Malloy gained additional attention due to the contemporaneous trial, conviction, and sentencing phase (which was under deliberation in the lead-up to Election Day) of Steven J. Hayes for a home invasion/murder in 2007 in Cheshire.

=== Candidates and running mates ===
- Democratic Party (also on line of the Working Families Party): Dannel Malloy – Nancy Wyman
- Republican Party: Thomas C. Foley – Mark Boughton
- Independent: Tom Marsh – Cicero Booker

=== Debates ===
On September 28, 2010, candidates Thomas C. Foley, Dannel Malloy, and Tom Marsh participated in the first gubernatorial debate of the 2010 race, a 50-minute, non-televised forum on education concerns in Hartford. In the debate, Foley stated that jobs and education would be his top priorities if elected governor, that more spending is not the solution to solve education-related problems, and that Malloy has "support[ed] the status quo" of teachers' unions. Malloy used the forum to advocate that schools report the amount of money spent in the classroom versus on school administration, stated that one "can be for reform and for teachers at the same time", and voiced support for a statewide universal pre-K program. Marsh stated that teachers' performance standards must improve and criticized the ratio that poorly performing doctors are removed from their jobs versus the rate at which underperforming teachers are.

Foley and Malloy met again two days later, on October 1, for a debate in Greenwich sponsored by the Greenwich, Stamford, and Norwalk chambers of commerce.

The first televised gubernatorial debate of the 2010 campaign took place on October 5, moderated by Fox News Channel chief political correspondent Carl Cameron and aired live on Fox Connecticut. Among other things in the debate in which the two opponents "clashed sharply," Foley voiced his support for retaining Connecticut's death penalty as is, pledging to veto abolishment bills placed on his desk as governor, while Malloy reiterated his opposition to capital punishment, though he stated he would not retroactively undo death sentences of individuals currently in the process. The candidates also took issue with each other's records, with Malloy accusing Foley of mismanagement while CEO of a Georgia textile mill and Foley labeling Malloy as a career politician who presided as mayor of Stamford during years in which the city had net job losses. State labor department figures have shown Stamford to have lost more than 5,000 net jobs during the 14-year period of Malloy's tenure as mayor. The Republican and the Democrat also took issue with statements and actions taken during the election season, with Foley stating that Malloy's pledge to cut gubernatorial staff by 15 percent would amount to only approximately five positions being cut and Malloy criticizing Foley for not naming a preferred running mate for the position of lieutenant governor. Malloy clarified that he had meant cutting from all positions the governor has a role in filling, stating that "about 600" positions was the real figure. Foley responded to Malloy's questioning over his running mate by stating that Republican primary voters placed Danbury mayor Mark Boughton in the position as Republican nominee for lieutenant governor, not him, but praised Boughton's experience.

A second televised debate was held between the Republican and the Democrat on October 13 in New London. A third, an afternoon debate broadcast live from Fairfield University on Connecticut Public Television, WFSB, and WNPR radio, occurred on October 19. The candidates met for a final time on October 26 for a televised debate aired on NBC 30.

=== Predictions ===
| Source | Ranking | As of |
|---|---|---|
| Cook Political Report | Tossup | October 14, 2010 |
| Rothenberg | Tossup | October 28, 2010 |
| RealClearPolitics | Tossup | November 1, 2010 |
| Sabato's Crystal Ball | Lean D (flip) | October 28, 2010 |
| CQ Politics | Tossup | October 28, 2010 |

=== Polling ===
| Poll source | Dates administered | Dannel Malloy (D) | Thomas C. Foley (R) |
|---|---|---|---|
| Rasmussen Reports | October 31, 2010 | 46% | 48% |
| Quinnipiac | October 25–31, 2010 | 45% | 48% |
| Public Policy Polling | October 27–29, 2010 | 47% | 49% |
| CT Capitol Report/Merriman River Group | October 24–26, 2010 | 45.1% | 45.1% |
| Rasmussen Reports | October 24, 2010 | 49% | 46% |
| Quinnipiac | October 18–24, 2010 | 48% | 43% |
| Suffolk University | October 19–20, 2010 | 49% | 38% |
| Rasmussen Reports | October 14, 2010 | 49% | 45% |
| Quinnipiac | October 7–11, 2010 | 49% | 42% |
| Fox News/Pulse Opinion Research | October 9, 2010 | 45% | 41% |
| Rasmussen Reports | October 5, 2010 | 49% | 44% |
| CNN/Time/Opinion Research Corporation | October 1–5, 2010 | 50% | 42% |
| CT Capitol Report/Merriman River Group | October 3, 2010 | 47.5% | 44.9% |
| Fox News/Pulse Opinion Research | October 2, 2010 | 47% | 41% |
| Quinnipiac | September 21–26, 2010 | 45% | 42% |
| Rasmussen Reports | September 26, 2010 | 50% | 40% |
| Quinnipiac | September 8–12, 2010 | 50% | 41% |
| Rasmussen Reports | September 9, 2010 | 46% | 39% |
| Rasmussen Reports | August 11, 2010 | 48% | 33% |
| Quinnipiac | July 28 – August 2, 2010 | 46% | 31% |
| Quinnipiac | July 7–13, 2010 | 44% | 33% |
| Rasmussen Reports | June 1, 2010 | 44% | 35% |
| Rasmussen Reports | April 1, 2010 | 35% | 44% |
| Rasmussen Reports | February 1, 2010 | 37% | 36% |
| Quinnipiac | January 14–19, 2010 | 37% | 33% |
| Public Policy Polling | January 4–5, 2010 | 37% | 27% |

=== Bridgeport ballot shortage ===
A dozen polling locations in the city of Bridgeport ran out of ballots on Election Day, leading to a ruling by Superior Court Judge Marshall K. Berger, Jr., for the polls to remain open at the affected polling sites until 10 p.m., two hours later than the normal statewide 8 p.m. closing time, in order for disenfranchised voters to return to vote on newly printed ballots. Bridgeport officials had initially ordered only 21,000 ballots, despite there being over 69,000 registered voters in the city.

With all votes counted, with the exception of Bridgeport, Republican Tom Foley held a slight lead in the popular vote (556,787 to 548,378). Once the ballots from Bridgeport were counted, Democrat Dan Malloy was declared the winner by Secretary of the State Susan Bysiewicz, who, according to the Stamford Advocate, based her announcement on preliminary, "informal totals. ... That does not include uncounted absentee ballots." Byseiwicz's announcement conflicted with the latest statewide tallies compiled by Foley's team and the non-partisan Associated Press, both of which indicated Foley to be in the lead by a thin margin.

Judge Berger did state in his ruling that all votes submitted after 8 p.m. would be counted as provisional ballots and kept separate from the others. The state Republican Party threatened a legal challenge.

On November 8, Foley, though still concerned over the election's handling and precise vote totals, conceded the election, stating, "The election on Tuesday was a conclusive victory for Dan Malloy, and this result should not be questioned."

=== Results ===

2010 Connecticut gubernatorial election
| Party | Candidate | Votes | % | ±% |
|---|---|---|---|---|
| Democratic | Dannel Malloy | 540,970 | 47.21% | +11.76% |
| Working Families | Dannel Malloy | 26,308 | 2.30% | N/A |
| Total | Dannel Malloy | 567,278 | 49.51% | +14.06% |
| Republican | Thomas C. Foley | 560,874 | 48.95% | −14.25% |
| Independent | Thomas E. Marsh | 17,629 | 1.54% | N/A |
| Write-in | | 18 | 0.00% | N/A |
| Total votes | | 1,145,799 | 100.00% | N/A |
| Democratic gain from Republican | | | | |

==== By county ====
| County | Dannel Malloy | | | | | | Thomas Foley Republican | | Various Candidates Other parties | | Total votes |
| County | Democratic | | Working Families | | Total | | Thomas Foley Republican | | Various Candidates Other parties | | Total votes |
| County | # | % | # | % | # | % | # | % | # | % | Total votes |
|---|---|---|---|---|---|---|---|---|---|---|---|
| Fairfield | 131,572 | 46.41% | 4,929 | 1.74% | 136,501 | 48.14% | 144,795 | 51.07% | 2,228 | 0.79% | 283,524 |
| Hartford | 142,950 | 49.53% | 8,241 | 2.86% | 151,191 | 52.39% | 133,159 | 46.14% | 4,248 | 1.47% | 288,598 |
| Litchfield | 27,794 | 38.50% | 1,130 | 1.57% | 28,924 | 39.89% | 42,111 | 58.07% | 1,483 | 2.05% | 72,518 |
| Middlesex | 29,830 | 45.80% | 1,483 | 2.28% | 31,313 | 48.08% | 32,102 | 49.29% | 1,710 | 2.63% | 65,125 |
| New Haven | 129,740 | 49.45% | 6,536 | 2.49% | 136,276 | 51.95% | 122,002 | 46.50% | 4,064 | 1.55% | 262,342 |
| New London | 39,877 | 46.50% | 1,888 | 2.20% | 41,765 | 48.70% | 42,090 | 49.08% | 1,911 | 2.23% | 85,766 |
| Tolland | 23,884 | 44.46% | 1,212 | 2.26% | 25,096 | 46.72% | 27,501 | 51.19% | 1,123 | 2.09% | 53,720 |
| Windham | 15,323 | 44.82% | 889 | 2.60% | 16,212 | 47.42% | 17,114 | 50.06% | 862 | 2.52% | 34,188 |
| Totals | 540,970 | 47.21% | 26,308 | 2.30% | 567,278 | 49.51% | 560,874 | 48.95% | 17,647 (Note: Includes 18 write-in votes that were attributed to a specific county) | 1.54% | 1,145,799 |

Counties that flipped from Republican to Democratic

- Hartford (largest town: Hartford)
- New Haven (largest town: New Haven)

==== By congressional district ====
Despite winning, Malloy only won two of five congressional districts, while Foley won the other three, all of which were held by Democrats.

| District | Dannel Malloy Democratic | | Thomas Foley Republican | | Various candidates Independent | | Total votes cast | Representative |
| District | # | % | # | % | # | % | Total votes cast | Representative |
|---|---|---|---|---|---|---|---|---|
| 1st | 124,111 | 53.88% | 102,805 | 44.63% | 3,440 | 1.49% | 230,356 | John B. Larson |
| 2nd | 115,171 | 46.53% | 126,722 | 51.20% | 5,615 | 2.27% | 247,508 | Joe Courtney |
| 3rd | 119,855 | 54.35% | 97,474 | 44.20% | 3,206 | 1.45% | 220,535 | Rosa DeLauro |
| 4th | 107,942 | 49.42% | 108,960 | 49.88% | 1,542 | 0.70% | 218,444 | Jim Himes |
| 5th | 100,199 | 43.76% | 124,913 | 54.56% | 3,844 | 1.68% | 228,956 | Chris Murphy |
| Totals | 567,278 | 49.51% | 560,874 | 48.95% | 17,647 | 1.54% | 1,145,799 | |

== See also ==
- 2010 United States gubernatorial elections
