= Ken Gucker =

American politician

Member of the Connecticut House of Representatives from the 138th district
- Incumbent
- Assumed office 2025
- Preceded by: Rachel Chaleski
- In office 2019–2023
- Preceded by: Michael Ferguson
- Succeeded by: Rachel Chaleski

Personal details
- Party: Democratic
- Education: Western Connecticut State University

Kenneth Gucker is an American Democratic Party politician who serves as a member of the Connecticut House of Representatives from the 138th district, which included part of the city of Danbury, as well as parts of the towns of New Fairfield and Ridgefield. Gucker was first elected in 2018 by a two-point margin over Republican Michael Ferguson. Gucker was re-elected in 2020 by a 7-point margin over Republican Emile Buzaid. Gucker narrowly lost reelection in 2022 to Danbury Board of Education member Rachel Chaleski by a margin of 26 votes. Gucker reclaimed his seat in 2024, winning against Chaleski by a margin of 142 votes.
