= 2014 Connecticut gubernatorial election =

- November 4, 2014
- Turnout: 55.60% (▼1.85%)
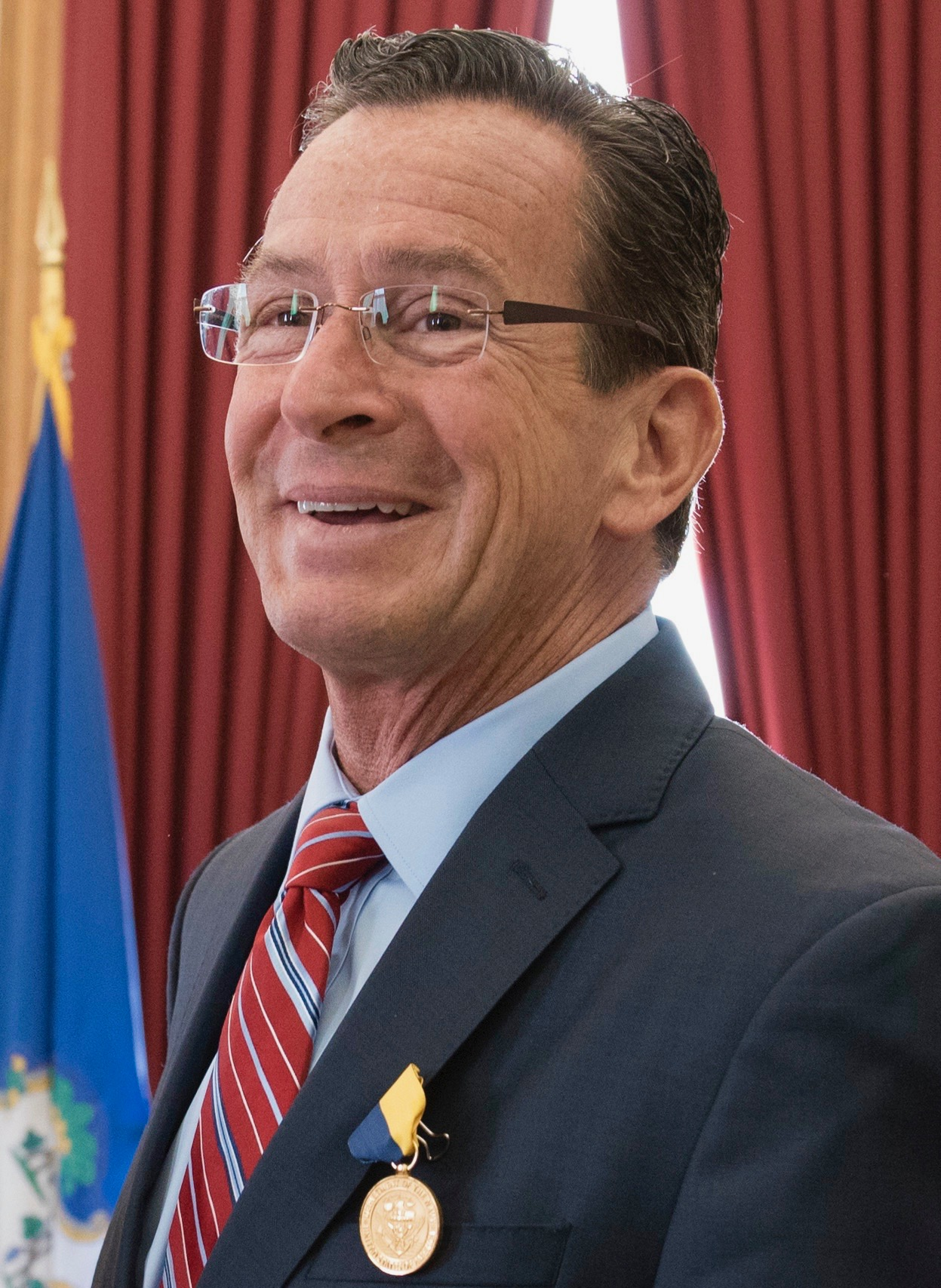

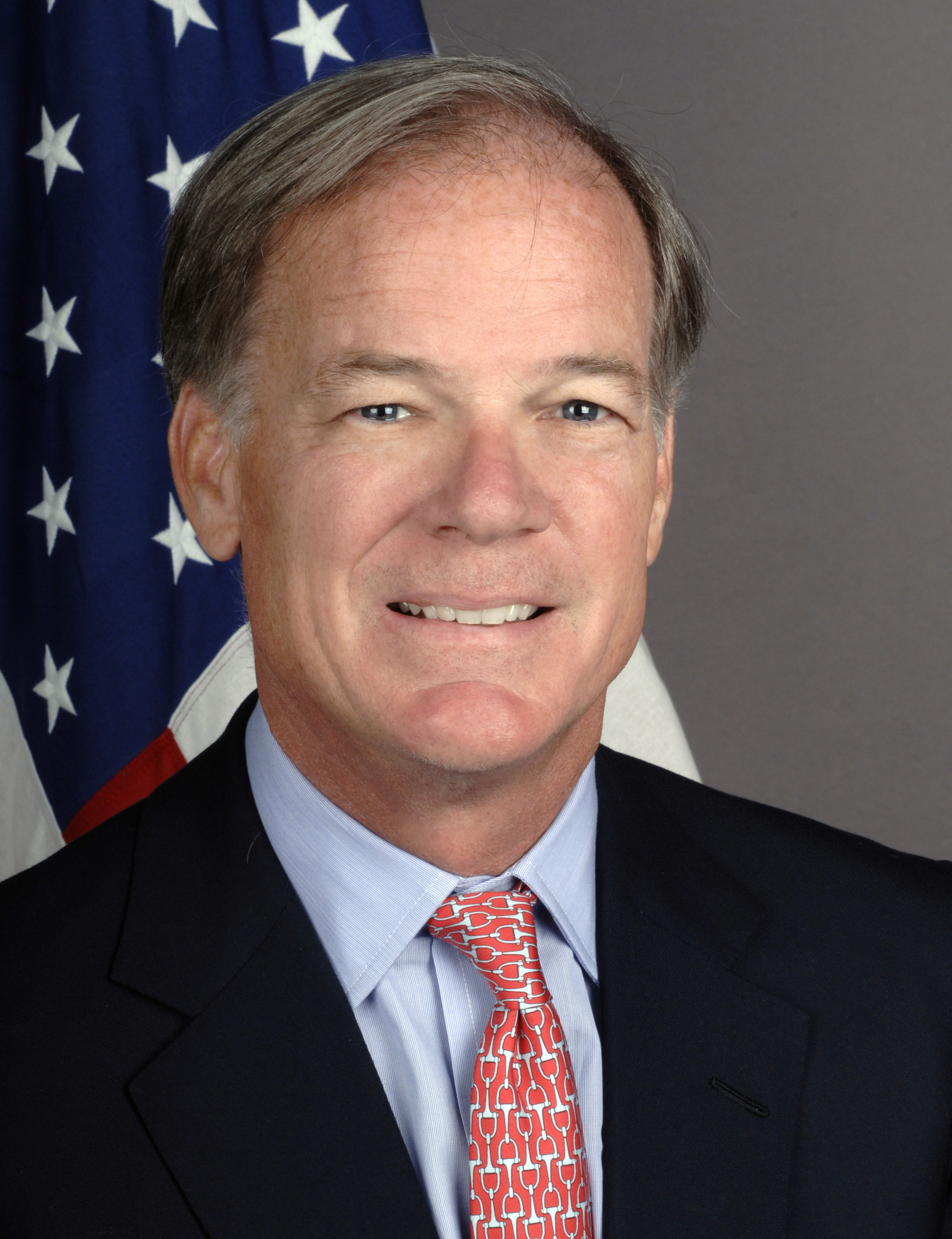
Nominee	Dannel Malloy	Thomas C. Foley
Party	Democratic	Republican
Alliance	Working Families	Independent
Running mate	Nancy Wyman	Heather Somers
Popular vote	554,314	526,295
Percentage	50.73%	48.16%
- Malloy: 40–50% 50–60% 60–70% 70–80% 80–90% Foley: 40–50% 50–60% 60–70% 70–80%
Governor before election
Dannel Malloy
Democratic
Elected Governor
Dannel Malloy
Democratic

The 2014 Connecticut gubernatorial election took place on November 4, 2014, to elect the governor and lieutenant governor of Connecticut, concurrently with elections to the United States Senate in other states and elections to the United States House of Representatives and various state and local elections.

Incumbent Democratic Governor Dannel Malloy won re-election to a second term in office. Connecticut, unlike most states, holds separate primary elections for governor and lieutenant governor, with the winners then running together on the same ticket.

Malloy and incumbent Lieutenant Governor Nancy Wyman were renominated unopposed. The Republicans nominated former U.S. Ambassador to Ireland and nominee for governor in 2010 Thomas C. Foley and Groton Town Councilor Heather Somers, making the contest a rematch of the 2010 election. Independent candidate Joe Visconti, a former West Hartford Town Councilor and the Republican nominee for Connecticut's 1st congressional district in 2008 was running with Chester Harris, a former Republican Haddam School Board Member. Visconti suspended his campaign on November 2 and endorsed Foley. However, due to the suspension coming only two days before the election, Visconti's name remained on the ballot. Former State Representative Jonathan Pelto (D-Mansfield) explored a third-party candidacy through a petition drive but was disqualified due to an inadequate number of signatures.

== Democratic primary ==
=== Governor ===
==== Candidates ====
===== Declared =====
- Dannel Malloy, incumbent Governor

==== Withdrew ====
- Lee Whitnum, writer, candidate for Connecticut's 4th congressional district in 2008 and candidate for the U.S. Senate in 2010 and 2012

=== Lieutenant governor ===
==== Candidates ====
===== Declared =====
- Nancy Wyman, incumbent Lieutenant Governor

=== Results ===
Malloy and Wyman ran unopposed for the Democratic nomination, so no primaries were held.

== Republican primary ==
=== Governor ===
2010 nominee Thomas C. Foley won the endorsement of the state party at the Republican State Convention on May 17, winning 57.1% of the vote. Danbury Mayor Mark Boughton and State Senate Minority Leader John McKinney took 22.3% and 17.72%, respectively, meeting the 15% vote threshold and thus also qualified for the primary ballot. Shelton Mayor Mark Lauretti and former West Hartford Town Councilor Joe Visconti failed to get 15% of the vote at the convention, so neither automatically qualified for the ballot. Visconti began collecting signatures to petition his way onto the ballot. He needed the signatures of 8,190 registered Republican voters by June 10 in order to qualify and he started collecting signatures when primary petitions became available at the end of April. Lauretti began to collect signatures a few days after the convention, but withdrew those petitions on May 22 to instead try to petition onto the ballot for lieutenant governor.

On June 6, Visconti announced that he was short of the required number of signatures, and with the filing deadline only 4 days away, was withdrawing from the race to run as an independent instead. Boughton suspended his campaign on June 18, primarily because he did not think Lauretti, his unofficial running mate, would qualify for the ballot, which would have meant Boughton failing to qualify for public financing. He called for "party unity behind the endorsed Republican candidate, Tom Foley."

==== Candidates ====
===== Declared =====
- Thomas C. Foley, former U.S. Ambassador to Ireland and nominee for governor in 2010
- John P. McKinney, Minority Leader of the Connecticut Senate

===== Withdrew =====
- Toni Boucher, state senator
- Mark Boughton, Mayor of Danbury and nominee for lieutenant governor in 2010
- Martha Dean, nominee for Connecticut Attorney General in 2002 and 2010
- Mark Lauretti, Mayor of Shelton (ran for Lieutenant Governor)
- Joe Visconti, former West Hartford Town Councilor and nominee for Connecticut's 1st congressional district in 2008 (running as unaffiliated)

===== Declined =====
- Lawrence F. Cafero, Minority Leader of the Connecticut House of Representatives
- Michael Fedele, former lieutenant governor and candidate for governor in 2010 (running for Mayor of Stamford)
- Pauline R. Kezer, former Secretary of the State of Connecticut
- Linda McMahon, businesswoman and nominee for the U.S. Senate in 2010 and 2012
- Chris Shays, former U.S. Representative and candidate for the U.S. Senate in 2012

==== Polling ====
Poll source	Date(s) administered	Sample size	Margin of error	Toni Boucher	Mark Boughton	Lawrence F. Cafero	Martha Dean	Thomas C. Foley	Mark Lauretti	John P. McKinney	Joe Visconti	Other	Undecided
Quinnipiac	May 1–6, 2014	443	±4.7%	—	9%	—	5%	39%	3%	8%	4%	2%	30%
Quinnipiac	Feb. 26–March 2, 2014	477	±4.5%	2%	11%	—	—	36%	6%	3%	3%	1%	37%
Quinnipiac	June 12–17, 2013	283	±5.8%	—	8%	4%	—	36%	—	11%	—	1%	41%

==== Results ====
Results by county: Foley—60–70% Foley—50–60% McKinney—50–60%

Republican primary results
Party	Candidate	Votes	%
Republican	Thomas C. Foley	44,144	55.58
Republican	John P. McKinney	35,282	44.42
Total votes		79,426	100.00

=== Lieutenant governor ===
Although separate primary elections are held for governor and lieutenant governor, candidates for each office often join together to form unofficial "tickets". Heather Bond Somers had originally been running on such a "ticket" with Mark Boughton, but she withdrew from the arrangement. Boughton later announced Mark Lauretti as his new running mate. This arrangement came to an end when Boughton withdrew, primarily because he did not think Lauretti would qualify for the ballot, which would have meant Boughton failing to qualify for public financing. David M. Walker teamed up with John P. McKinney. Bacchiochi did not join any "ticket".

Bacchiochi won the endorsement of the state party at the Republican State Convention on May 17, winning 50.9% of the vote. Somers took 31.5% and Walker got 17.4%, meaning they both also qualified for the primary ballot. Lauretti attempted to petition his way onto the ballot; he was unsuccessful, filing only 6,723 of the required 8,190 signatures.

==== Candidates ====
===== Declared =====
- Penny Bacchiochi, state representative
- Heather Bond Somers, Groton Town Councilor and former Mayor of Groton
- David M. Walker, former Comptroller General of the United States

===== Withdrew =====
- Mark Lauretti, Mayor of Shelton

==== Results ====
Republican primary results by county Somers: 30–40%; 40–50%; Bacchiochi: 30–40%; 40–50%; Walker: 30–40%

Republican primary results
Party	Candidate	Votes	%
Republican	Heather Bond Somers	26,980	34.46
Republican	Penny Bacchiochi	26,311	33.06
Republican	David M. Walker	25,014	31.94
Total votes		78,305	100.00

== Independents ==
=== Candidates ===
==== Withdrew ====
- Joe Visconti, former West Hartford Town Councilor and Republican nominee for Connecticut's 1st congressional district in 2008
  Running mate: Chester Harris, former Republican Haddam School Board Member

==== Disqualified ====
- Jonathan Pelto, Democratic former state representative
  Running mate: Ebony Murphy-Root, teacher

== General election ==
=== Debates ===
- Complete video of debate, August 27, 2014 - C-SPAN
- Complete video of debate, October 2, 2014 - C-SPAN

=== Predictions ===
Source	Ranking	As of
The Cook Political Report	Tossup	November 3, 2014
Sabato's Crystal Ball	Lean D	November 3, 2014
Rothenberg Political Report	Tossup	November 3, 2014
Real Clear Politics	Tossup	November 3, 2014

=== Fundraising ===
Campaign finance reports as of October 10, 2014
Candidate	Raised	Spent	Cash on hand
Dannel Malloy (D)	$6,501,239	$6,716,337	$2,326,904
Thomas C. Foley (R)	$7,944,883	$8,230,236	$4,238,039
Source: Connecticut State Elections Enforcement Commission

=== Polling ===
Poll source	Date(s) administered	Sample size	Margin of error	Dannel Malloy (D)	Thomas C. Foley (R)	Joe Visconti (I)	Other	Undecided
Quinnipiac University	October 28 – November 2, 2014	926	± 3.2%	43%	42%	8%	1%	6%
Quinnipiac University	October 28 – November 2, 2014	926	± 3.2%	47%	44%	—	1%	7%
Public Policy Polling	October 30 – November 1, 2014	931	± 3.2%	44%	41%	6%	—	8%
Public Policy Polling	October 30 – November 1, 2014	931	± 3.2%	47%	44%	—	—	8%
Rasmussen Reports	October 29–30, 2014	977	± 3%	48%	47%	—	2%	4%
Quinnipiac University	October 22–27, 2014	838	± 3.4%	43%	43%	7%	1%	6%
Quinnipiac University	October 22–27, 2014	838	± 3.4%	44%	46%	—	1%	8%
CBS News/NYT/YouGov	October 16–23, 2014	1,267	± 4%	40%	40%	3%	0%	17%
Quinnipiac University	October 14–20, 2014	1,010	± 3.1%	43%	42%	9%	1%	6%
Quinnipiac University	October 14–20, 2014	1,010	± 3.1%	45%	45%	—	2%	8%
Rasmussen Reports	October 14–16, 2014	980	± 3.5%	43%	50%	—	2%	4%
Quinnipiac University	October 1–6, 2014	1,085	± 3%	43%	43%	9%	—	5%
Quinnipiac University	October 1–6, 2014	1,085	± 3%	46%	46%	—	1%	7%
Public Policy Polling	October 2–5, 2014	861	± 3.3%	43%	35%	9%	—	14%
Public Policy Polling	October 2–5, 2014	861	± 3.3%	45%	39%	—	—	16%
CBS News/NYT/YouGov	September 20 – October 1, 2014	1,284	± 3%	41%	41%	3%	1%	14%
Quinnipiac University	September 3–8, 2014	1,304	± 2.7%	40%	46%	7%	1%	6%
Quinnipiac University	September 3–8, 2014	1,304	± 2.7%	43%	49%	—	1%	7%
CBS News/NYT/YouGov	August 18 – September 2, 2014	1,808	± 3%	42%	41%	—	3%	14%
Rasmussen Reports	August 18–19, 2014	750	± 4%	38%	45%	—	7%	10%
Gravis Marketing	August 4–7, 2014	440	± 5%	38%	46%	—	—	16%
Anzalone Liszt Grove	July 28–29, 2014	900	± ?	46%	46%	—	—	8%
Vox Populi Polling	July 27–28, 2014	550	± 4.2%	35%	34%	—	3%	27%
CBS News/NYT/YouGov	July 5–24, 2014	1,177	± ?	41%	48%	—	4%	8%
Quinnipiac University	May 1–6, 2014	1,668	± 2.4%	43%	43%	—	1%	12%
Quinnipiac University	February 26 – March 2, 2014	1,878	± 2.3%	42%	42%	—	1%	14%
Quinnipiac University	June 12–17, 2013	1,154	± 2.9%	40%	43%	—	1%	16%

Hypothetical polling

Poll source	Date(s) administered	Sample size	Margin of error	Dannel Malloy (D)	Toni Boucher (R)	Other	Undecided
Quinnipiac University	February 26 – March 2, 2014	1,878	± 2.3%	45%	34%	2%	19%

Poll source	Date(s) administered	Sample size	Margin of error	Dannel Malloy (D)	Mark Boughton (R)	Other	Undecided
Quinnipiac University	May 1–6, 2014	1,668	± 2.4%	44%	39%	1%	16%
Quinnipiac University	February 26 – March 2, 2014	1,878	± 2.3%	44%	35%	2%	19%
Quinnipiac University	June 12–17, 2013	1,154	± 2.9%	43%	36%	1%	19%

Poll source	Date(s) administered	Sample size	Margin of error	Dannel Malloy (D)	Lawrence F. Cafero (R)	Other	Undecided
Quinnipiac University	June 12–17, 2013	1,154	± 2.9%	44%	37%	2%	18%

Poll source	Date(s) administered	Sample size	Margin of error	Dannel Malloy (D)	Martha Dean (R)	Other	Undecided
Quinnipiac University	May 1–6, 2014	1,668	± 2.4%	46%	37%	1%	16%

Poll source	Date(s) administered	Sample size	Margin of error	Dannel Malloy (D)	Mark Lauretti (R)	Other	Undecided
Quinnipiac University	May 1–6, 2014	1,668	± 2.4%	45%	37%	1%	17%
Quinnipiac University	February 26 – March 2, 2014	1,878	± 2.3%	44%	34%	2%	19%

Poll source	Date(s) administered	Sample size	Margin of error	Dannel Malloy (D)	John P. McKinney (R)	Other	Undecided
Gravis Marketing	August 4–7, 2014	440	± 5%	38%	45%	—	17%
Quinnipiac University	May 1–6, 2014	1,668	± 2.4%	44%	40%	1%	14%
Quinnipiac University	February 26 – March 2, 2014	1,878	± 2.3%	43%	37%	1%	18%
Quinnipiac University	June 12–17, 2013	1,154	± 2.9%	44%	37%	1%	18%

Poll source	Date(s) administered	Sample size	Margin of error	Dannel Malloy (D)	Generic Republican	Other	Undecided
Public Policy Polling	November 1–2, 2012	1,220	± 2.8%	48%	37%	—	15%

Poll source	Date(s) administered	Sample size	Margin of error	Dannel Malloy (D)	Joe Visconti (R)	Other	Undecided
Quinnipiac University	May 1–6, 2014	1,668	± 2.4%	46%	36%	1%	17%
Quinnipiac University	February 26 – March 2, 2014	1,878	± 2.3%	45%	34%	2%	19%

=== Results ===

2014 Connecticut gubernatorial election
Party	Candidate	Votes	%	±%
Democratic	Dannel Malloy	529,552	48.46%	+1.25%
Working Families	Dannel Malloy	24,762	2.27%	−0.03%
Total	Dannel Malloy (incumbent)	554,314	50.73%	+1.22%
Republican	Thomas C. Foley	503,998	46.12%	−2.83%
Independent Party	Thomas C. Foley	22,297	2.04%	N/A
Total	Thomas C. Foley	526,295	48.16%	−0.79%
Independent	Joe Visconti	11,456	1.05%	N/A
Write-in		708	0.06%	N/A
Total votes		1,092,773	100.00%	N/A
Democratic hold				

==== By county ====
County	Dannel Malloy Democratic		Thomas Foley Republican		Various candidates Other parties		Total votes cast	
County	Fairfield	128,714	49.72%	128,629	49.69%	1,530	0.59%	258,873
Hartford	148,096	53.51%	125,722	45.43%	2,947	1.06%	276,765	
Litchfield	27,282	39.40%	40,992	59.20%	974	1.41%	69,248	
Middlesex	31,478	49.45%	31,342	49.24%	833	1.31%	63,653	
New Haven	135,973	53.37%	116,068	45.56%	2,713	1.06%	254,754	
New London	42,983	51.30%	39,666	47.34%	1,132	1.35%	83,781	
Tolland	23,887	45.99%	27,315	52.59%	738	1.42%	66,450	
Windham	15,901	48.11%	16,561	50.11%	589	1.78%	33,051	
Total	554,314	50.73%	526,295	48.16%	12,164	1.11%	1,092,773	

Counties that flipped from Republican to Democratic

- Fairfield (largest town: Bridgeport)
- Middlesex (largest town: Middletown)
- New London (largest town: Norwich)

==== By congressional district ====
Despite his win, and managing to flip back three counties, Malloy only won two of the five congressional districts, while Foley won the other three, all of which were held by Democrats. This result exactly replicated the previous election for governor in 2010 by congressional district between Malloy and Foley.

District	Dannel Malloy Democratic		Thomas Foley Republican		Various candidates Independent		Total votes cast	Representative
District	#	%	#	%	#	%	Total votes cast	Representative
1st	122,097	54.33%	100,031	44.51%	2,610	1.16%	224,738	John B. Larson
2nd	111,560	47.96%	117,788	50.64%	3,246	1.40%	232,594	Joe Courtney
3rd	120,938	56.17%	92,107	42.79%	2,244	1.04%	215,289	Rosa DeLauro
4th	100,667	49.60%	100,711	49.62%	1,586	0.78%	202,964	Jim Himes
5th	99,052	45.60%	115,658	53.26%	2,478	1.14%	217,188	Elizabeth Esty
Totals	554,314	50.73%	526,295	48.16%	12,164	1.11%	1,092,773	

== See also ==
- 2014 United States gubernatorial elections
