= Dannel Malloy =

American politician (born 1955)

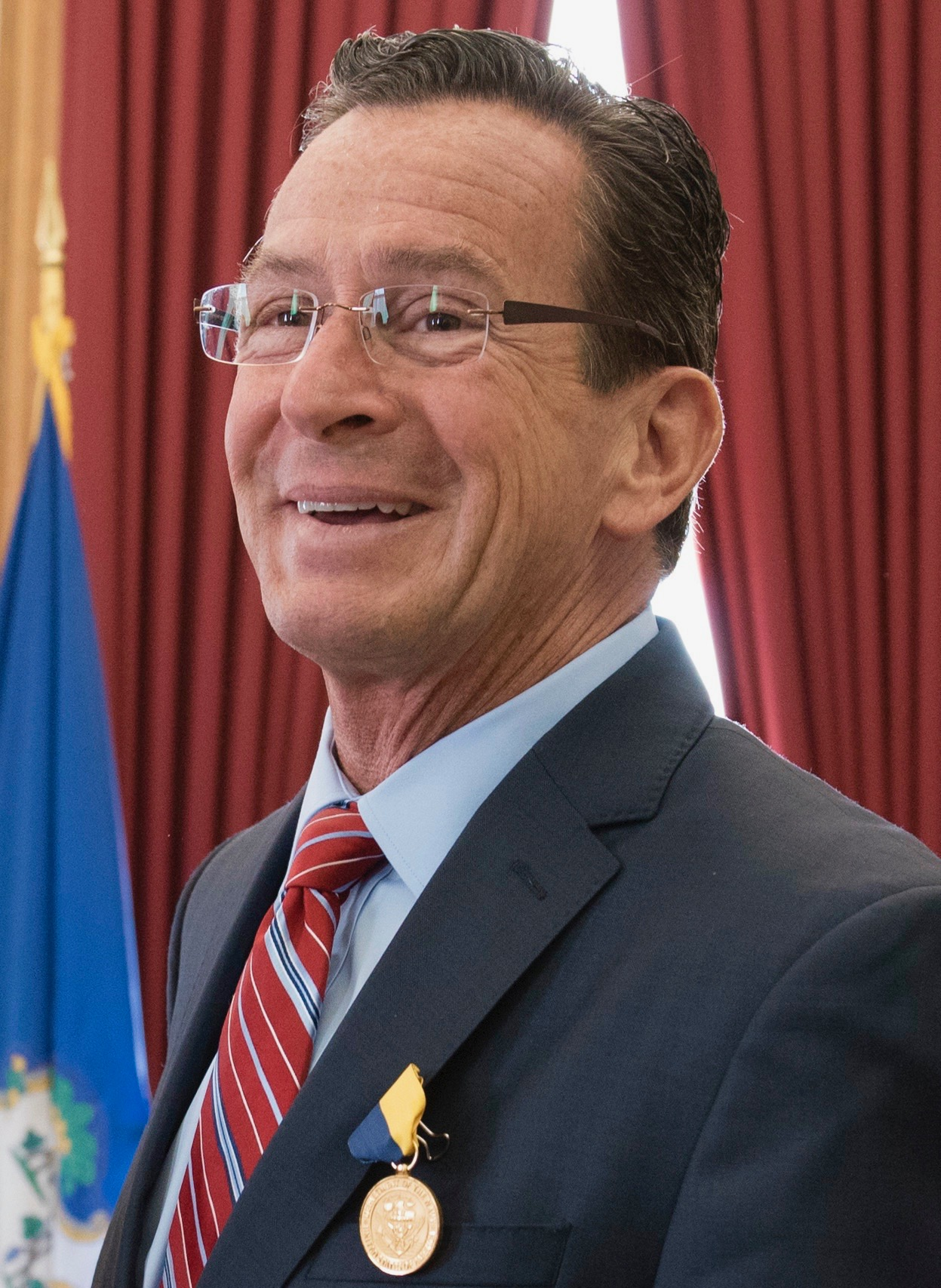
- Malloy in 2016

6th Chancellor of the University of Maine System
- Incumbent
- Assumed office July 1, 2019
- Preceded by: James H. Page

88th Governor of Connecticut
- In office January 5, 2011 – January 9, 2019
- Lieutenant: Nancy Wyman
- Preceded by: Jodi Rell
- Succeeded by: Ned Lamont

29th Mayor of Stamford
- In office December 1, 1995 – November 30, 2009
- Preceded by: Stanley Esposito
- Succeeded by: Michael Pavia

Personal details
- Born: Dannel Patrick Malloy; July 21, 1955 (age 71) Stamford, Connecticut, U.S.
- Party: Democratic
- Spouse: Cathy Lambert (m. 1982)
- Children: 3
- Education: Boston College (BA, JD)

Dannel Patrick Malloy (/ˈdænəl məˈlɔɪ/; born July 21, 1955) is an American politician who served as the 88th governor of Connecticut from 2011 to 2019. A member of the Democratic Party, he chaired the Democratic Governors Association from 2016 to 2017. He is currently Chancellor of the University of Maine System, a position he has held since July 2019.

Born in Stamford, Connecticut, Malloy attended Boston College for both undergraduate and law degrees. Malloy began his career as an assistant district attorney in New York in 1980 before moving back to Stamford and entering private practice. He served on the Stamford board of finance from 1984 to 1994 before being elected Mayor of Stamford. He served four terms as mayor from December 1995 to December 2009.

Malloy ran unsuccessfully for Governor of Connecticut in 2006, losing the Democratic primary to John DeStefano, Jr., the Mayor of New Haven, who was defeated in the general election by Republican Governor Jodi Rell. He ran again in 2010 and comfortably won the primary, defeating Ned Lamont, the 2006 U.S. Senate nominee, by 57% of the vote to 43%. Rell did not run for reelection, and Malloy faced former United States Ambassador to Ireland Thomas C. Foley in the general election, defeating him by fewer than 6,500 votes. Malloy was sworn in on January 5, 2011. He was reelected in a rematch with Foley in 2014, increasing his margin of victory to over 28,000 votes. As of July 2018, he had a 21% job approval rating and a 71% disapproval rating, making him the second least popular and third most disliked governor in the United States, after Mary Fallin of Oklahoma. On April 13, 2017, Malloy announced he would not seek reelection in 2018. He was succeeded in office by Democrat Ned Lamont on January 9, 2019.

== Early life, education and early career ==
Dannel Patrick Malloy was born and raised in Stamford, Connecticut, the seventh of seven sons and youngest of the eight children of Agnes Veronica (née Egan), a nurse, and William Francis Malloy. He is of Irish descent and was raised as a Catholic.

As a child, Malloy had learning disabilities and difficulties with motor coordination. He did not learn to tie his shoes until the fifth grade. Malloy eventually was diagnosed with dyslexia and learned the skills necessary to succeed academically. He does not write or type, and rarely reads from notes in public, but developed an extraordinarily useful memory. He graduated magna cum laude from Boston College, where he met his wife Cathy, and later earned his J.D. degree from Boston College Law School.

After passing the bar exam, Malloy served as an Assistant District Attorney in Brooklyn, New York from 1980 to 1984. During his tenure as a prosecutor, Malloy tried 23 felony cases, four of them homicides, and won 22 convictions. He was subsequently a partner in the Stamford law firm of Abate and Fox from 1984 to 1995. He served on the Stamford Board of Finance from 1983 to 1994.

== Mayor of Stamford (1995–2009) ==
In 1995, he ran successfully for Mayor of Stamford, defeating two-term Republican incumbent Stanley Esposito. At the same time, voters approved a measure to extend the Mayor's term of office from two years to four, effective at the next election. He was re-elected in 1997, 2001 and 2005.

Malloy made crime reduction a priority during his tenure as mayor; Stamford saw a dramatic decrease in homicides under his administration. Stamford is currently ranked as the 9th safest city in the United States and 3rd safest in the Northeast region and for the past six years has ranked in the top 11 safest cities with populations of 100,000 or more, according to the FBI. Malloy wrote a blog known as "The Blog That Works", since deleted, until mid-January 2010.

Budgeting and districting of the various fire departments throughout the city has been unstable since 2007, due to an extended legal conflict between the volunteer departments and the Malloy administration, which sought to consolidate the fire departments against the advice and wishes of the volunteer fire departments.

== Governor of Connecticut (2011–2019) ==
=== Elections ===
==== 2006 ====
In 2004, Malloy was the first candidate to announce his bid for the Democratic Party nomination for Governor of Connecticut. In a major upset in Malloy's favor, he received the convention endorsement of the Democratic Party on May 20, 2006, by 4 votes. Malloy lost in the primary election however against New Haven Mayor John DeStefano, Jr. on August 8, 2006.

==== 2010 ====
On February 3, 2009, Malloy officially filed paperwork with Connecticut's State Elections Enforcement Commission to form a gubernatorial exploratory committee, and subsequently announced that he did not intend to seek re-election as Mayor of Stamford. On March 9, 2010, Malloy filed the required paperwork to officially run for governor.

Malloy received the Democratic Party's endorsement for governor on May 22, 2010, in a 68–32 vote over 2006 Democratic senatorial candidate Ned Lamont. Connecticut's Democratic Party rules allow any candidate who received more than 15% of the vote at its nominating convention to challenge the endorsed candidate for the nomination in a primary, and Lamont announced that he would challenge Malloy in the gubernatorial primary. The primary was held on August 10, 2010. Malloy won with 58% of the vote, according to AP-reported unofficial results. According to preliminary numbers, he beat Lamont 101,354 to 73,875.

As a Democratic candidate for governor prior to the Democratic state convention and subsequent primary, Malloy chose Nancy Wyman to be his running mate. Wyman is the only woman elected State Comptroller since the office was created in 1786. Malloy's choice was confirmed by the Democratic nominating convention on May 22, and Wyman became the official 2010 Democratic candidate for lieutenant governor when she defeated primary opponent Mary Glassman on August 10. After the primaries, candidates for governor and lieutenant governor run together as a team on a single ticket. Thus, Malloy and Wyman were both elected on November 2, 2010.

Malloy faced Republican Thomas C. Foley, the former United States Ambassador to Ireland under President George W. Bush, in the race for governor. Tom Foley had never been elected to public office. In the last Quinnipiac University Polling Institute poll released on the morning before Election Day, Malloy trailed Foley 48% to 45%.

According to The New York Times on November 3, Malloy was elected governor; they later placed Foley in the lead with no declared winner. The Associated Press had at one point also placed Foley ahead by 8,424 votes because they hadn't added the votes from New Haven or Bridgeport at that time. In the days following the election, there was controversy over several polling locations in Bridgeport remaining open until 10 p.m. on Election Day due to ballot shortages. Foley's team looked into the events that took place in Bridgeport and determined there was insufficient evidence of enough fraud to overcome the vote deficit.

==== 2014 ====
On March 28, 2014, Malloy announced his intention to seek a second term. With full support, he was unopposed in the Democratic primary. On August 12, Tom Foley, Malloy's Republican opponent in 2010, won his party's nomination, making the 2014 election a rematch of the bitter 2010 contest. As expected, the race was very close. On November 4, Malloy won reelection with 51.1 percent of the vote. Foley conceded the election on November 5 without direct communication with Malloy.

=== Tenure ===
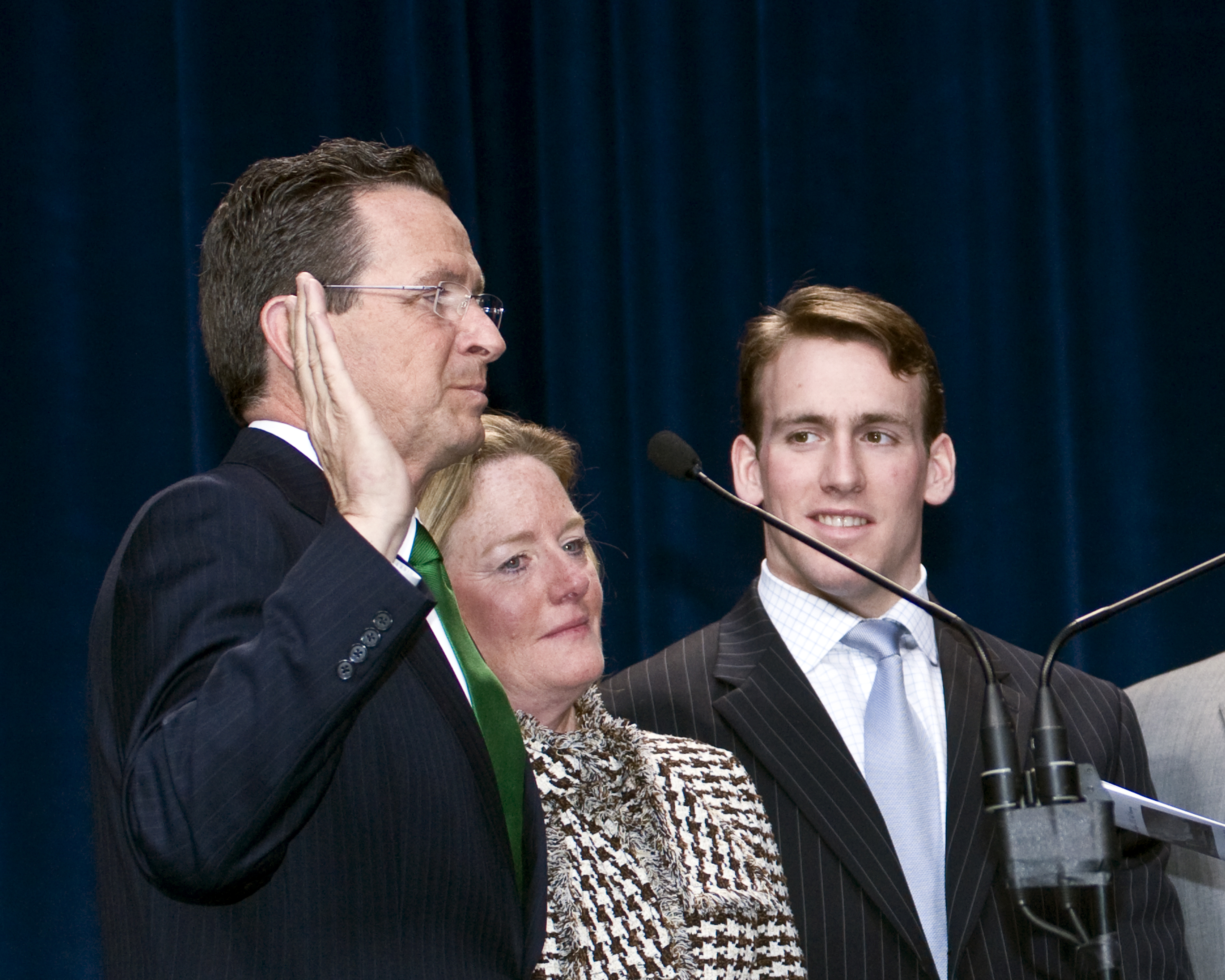
Dan Malloy taking the oath of office, January 2011

Malloy was sworn in as the 88th Governor of Connecticut on January 5, 2011, succeeding Republican Governor Jodi Rell.

In the state's legislative elections of November 2012, Republicans tried to tie Democratic legislators to Malloy, who had consistently faced negative job approval ratings. The strategy did not work and the Democrats recorded no losses in either house. Malloy called the results a "vindication" and said that "Tough times require tough decisions that are not immediately popular... you should not be afraid to make tough decisions, particularly if you are transparent about those decisions, if you explain why those decisions were necessary. In our case, the tough decisions we had to make were in fact caused by Republican governors."

According to a July 2016 New York Times survey, Malloy was the most unpopular Democratic governor in the country, with a 64% disapproval and 29% approval rating, and the second-most unpopular overall, after Republican Sam Brownback of Kansas.

==== Economy ====
The first task facing Malloy upon taking office was addressing a multibillion-dollar deficit as a result of the prior state budget enacted by the Democratic super-majority-controlled legislature which Rell chose to accept without signing. Malloy adopted what he called an agenda of "shared sacrifice" which was dependent on increases in various taxes, including the income tax, the gas tax, the sales tax, and the estate tax, as well as $1 billion each year in union concessions. Malloy chose not to reduce aid to municipalities as part of his budget agenda, although such aid would have been jeopardized if labor concessions were not reached. After two months of negotiations, in May 2011, Malloy won $1.6 billion in union givebacks. The budget deal meant that, in contrast to many other states, there were no layoffs. Many of Malloy's proposed tax increases were unpopular, despite a statewide "listening tour" to promote the budget.

==== Marijuana ====
In June 2011, Malloy signed a bill that decriminalized possession of small amounts of marijuana. Offenders pay a $150 fine for a first offense and a fine ranging from $200 to $500 for subsequent offenses. Those younger than 21 face a 60-day driver's license suspension. Paraphernalia has also been decriminalized as long as the person possesses under 1/2 an ounce of marijuana. Offenders may still be arrested for under 1/2 an ounce or a pipe if they are in a school zone and there is a mandatory minimum sentence (MMS) of 3 years. There is also an MMS of 3 years for sale to a minor.

Connecticut became the 17th state to legalize medical marijuana on June 1, 2012, after Malloy signed a bill into law. Some portions of the law were effective immediately while the remaining portions became effective on October 1, 2012.

In December 2016, Malloy publicly stated that he opposed the legalization of recreational marijuana in Connecticut and that he would not support legislative efforts at legalization.

==== LGBT equality ====
Malloy supports progressive social measures, including protections for transgender identity. Malloy praised the Transgender Rights Bill HB 6599 and promised he would sign it into law. It passed the legislature and he signed it on July 5, 2011. The bill protects the rights of transgender residents, including the right to use public facilities of the gender a person identifies with.

==== Labor laws ====
On September 21, 2011, Malloy issued Executive Orders 9 and 10, which would allow the Service Employees International Union to unionize day care workers subsidized through Care 4 Kids and personal care attendants under Medicaid waivers by redefining these employees as state employees for collective bargaining purposes. The executive orders generated intense opposition from child care providers, personal care attendants, their employers with disabilities, the National Federation of Independent Business, and We the People of Connecticut, a constitutionalist organization. Disability advocates objected to being excluded from the decision-making process, to union interference in the intimate relationship between employers and PCAs, and to the likely loss of PCA hours under a capped program; NFIB feared a "terrible precedent" in allowing other union organizing drives of small businesses by executive order through card check; and legislators viewed Malloy's actions as a violation of the state Constitution's separation of powers. Malloy responded that these workers, whom he described as being among the hardest working and lowest paid, deserved the opportunity to collectively bargain if they wished to do so.

==== Criminal justice ====
Malloy, who has long campaigned against capital punishment, signed a bill to repeal the state's death penalty on April 25, 2012. The bill was not retroactive and did not affect those on death row in Connecticut at the time. On August 13, 2015, however, the Connecticut Supreme Court ruled in 2015 in State v. Santiago that the legislature's decision to prospectively abolish capital punishment rendered it an offense to "evolving standards of decency," thus commuting the sentences of the 11 men remaining on death row to life in prison without parole. Malloy was in the process of having Connecticut be the first state in the nation to raise the age of being within the juvenile system from 18 to 21 via the Second Chance initiative.

==== Education ====
Malloy's "centerpiece" education reform bill was unanimously passed by the Connecticut House of Representatives and signed into law in early May 2012. The bill increases funding for early childhood education and poorer school districts, creates 1,000 more preschool places, creates a kindergarten to third grade literacy pilot program and reformed teacher tenure, tying it to performance.

==== Voting ====
Also in May 2012, Malloy signed a bill that expanded voting rights in Connecticut, allowing for same-day voter registration. Other provisions to allow early voting and "no-excuse" absentee ballots will be subject to a referendum, to be held in 2014. It also allows for online voter registration, beginning in 2014.

==== Gun laws ====
In the wake of the Sandy Hook Elementary School shooting in Newtown in December 2012, Malloy pushed for strict new gun control laws. In April 2013, he signed into law a bill that passed the legislature with bipartisan support and required universal background checks, banned magazines with a capacity of more than 10 rounds, created the country's first registry for dangerous-weapon offenders and added over 100 types of gun to the state's assault weapons ban.

In December 2015, Malloy announced he would issue an executive order to prohibit anyone on federal terrorist watchlists (such as the No Fly List) from obtaining the permits required to acquire firearms in Connecticut. The executive order would also revoke existing permits for people on such lists.

==== Immigration laws ====
On June 7, 2013, Malloy signed a bill that allows all residents of Connecticut, including illegal immigrants, to apply for a driver's license. He called it a public safety issue that "needs to be addressed". The licenses cannot be used to vote or board a plane and the bill took effect in July 2015.

==== Other issues ====
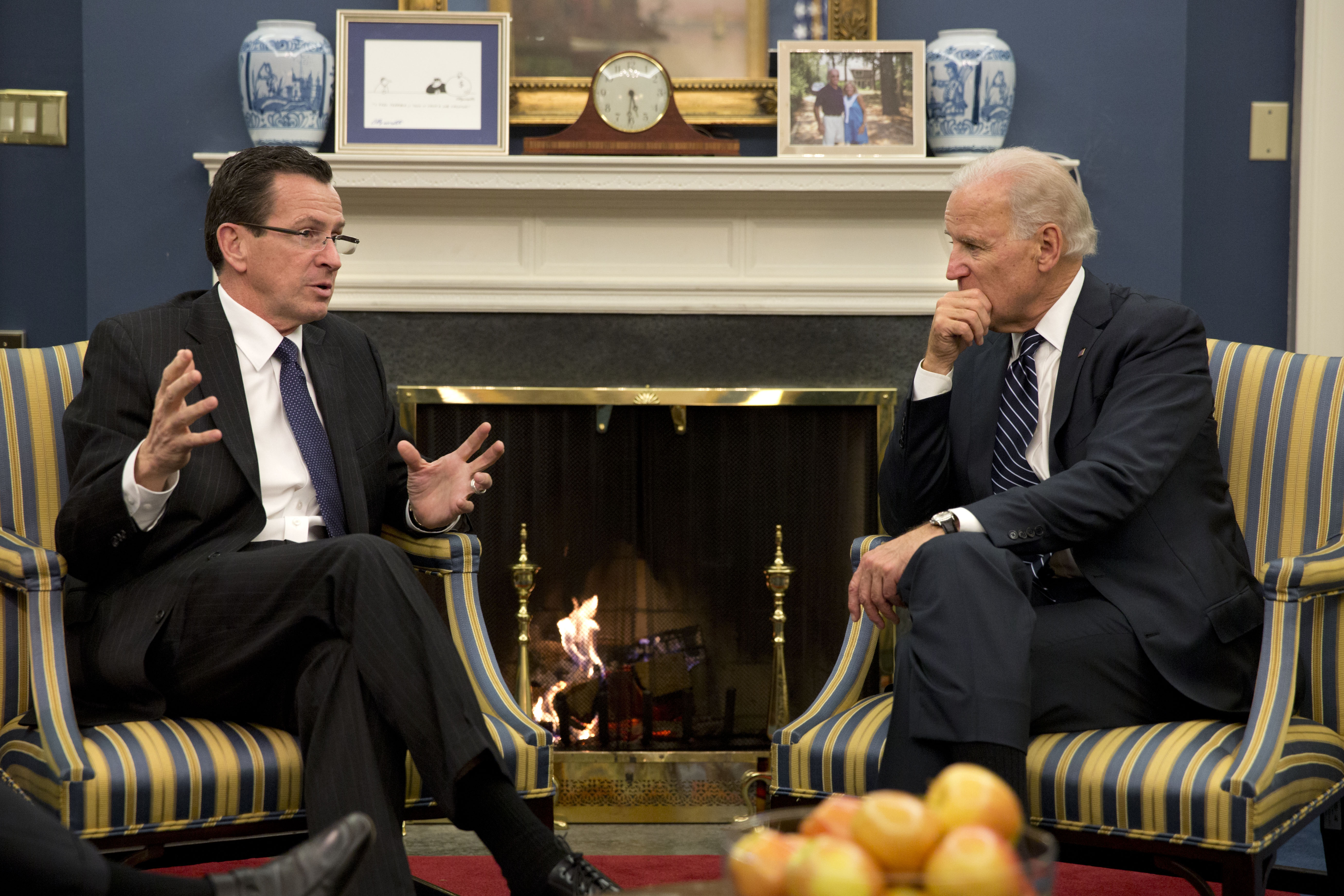
Malloy meets with Vice President Joe Biden in 2013

At the end of May 2012, Malloy signed a bill that repealed Connecticut's ban on the sale of alcohol on Sundays. Connecticut, Georgia, Indiana and Minnesota had previously been the only states that still had broad restrictions on the sale of alcohol on Sundays.

In response to Hurricane Sandy, Malloy partially activated the state's Emergency Operations Center on October 26, 2012 and signed a Declaration of Emergency the next day. On October 28, President Barack Obama approved Connecticut's request for an emergency declaration, and hundreds of National Guard personnel were deployed. On October 29, Malloy ordered road closures for all state highways. Numerous mandatory and partial evacuations were issued in cities across Connecticut. Malloy's strong initial response is credited with helping the state to avoid much of the damage that affected neighbouring New York City and nearby New Jersey. Five people were killed and over 30,000 houses were destroyed. The Federal Emergency Management Agency gave the state over $283 million in the 6 months following the hurricane and in August 2013, Malloy announced that the Department of Housing and Urban Development was giving another $71.8 million.

== Chancellor of University of Maine System ==
Malloy was unanimously chosen by the University of Maine System Board of Trustees to be its Chancellor on May 30, 2019, with his service beginning on July 1. Under Malloy's leadership, since 2021, three of the eight University of Maine System campus presidents have resigned — University of Maine at Augusta, University of Maine at Farmington, and University of Southern Maine.

In 2022, Malloy withheld information on a prior campus faculty vote of "No Confidence" for the replacement president hired at University of Maine Augusta, and presided over the layoff of nine tenure-rank faculty positions at University of Maine at Farmington. Subsequently, the faculty senates of University of Maine at Augusta and University of Southern Maine voted "No Confidence" in Malloy and called for his resignation, and the students of University of Maine at Farmington held a "sit in" and also called for Malloy's resignation as Chancellor.

== Memberships ==
- Chairman of the Democratic Governors Association, 2016 – 2017
- Trustee and Vice Chair for Education of the Jobs, Education & Workforce Committee, United States Conference of Mayors
- Co-chair of Small Business/Partner America Task Force, United States Conference of Mayors
- Former Member, Executive Committee of the Democratic National Committee
- Former President, Connecticut Conference of Municipalities
- Adjunct Professor, the University of Connecticut
- Member, Board of Trustees, Mitchell College, New London, Connecticut
- Member, Mayors Against Illegal Guns Coalition

== Personal life ==
Malloy and his wife have been married since 1982. Cathy Malloy is the chief executive officer of the Greater Hartford Arts Council. She formerly served as executive director of the Center for Sexual Assault Crisis Counseling and Education serving lower Fairfield County. The couple has three sons: Dannel, Ben, and Sam.

In 2007, Malloy's youngest son, Sam, then 14 years old, was involved in an incident in which he and a group of other boys at Stamford High School allegedly called Candace Owens and left racist hate speech and violent threats on her voicemail. The incident resulted in a settlement between the Stamford Board of Education and the Owens family.

== Electoral history ==
Connecticut Gubernatorial Democratic primary election, 2006
Party	Candidate	Votes	%
Democratic	John DeStefano, Jr.	135,431	50.78
Democratic	Dannel P. Malloy	131,258	49.22
Total votes		266,689	100

Connecticut Gubernatorial Democratic primary election, 2010
Party	Candidate	Votes	%
Democratic	Dannel P. Malloy	103,154	57.01
Democratic	Ned Lamont	77,772	42.99
Total votes		180,926	100

Connecticut Gubernatorial election, 2010
Party	Candidate	Votes	%
Democratic	Dannel P. Malloy	567,278	49.51
Republican	Thomas C. Foley	560,874	48.95
Independent	Thomas Marsh	17,629	1.54
Other	Write-in votes	18	0.01
Total votes		1,145,799	100
Democratic gain from Republican			

Connecticut Gubernatorial election, 2014
Party	Candidate	Votes	%
Democratic	Dannel P. Malloy (incumbent)	554,314	50.73
Republican	Thomas C. Foley	526,295	48.16
Independent	Joe Visconti	11,456	1.05
Other	Write-in votes	708	0.10
Total votes		1,092,773	100
Democratic hold			

Political offices
Preceded by Stanley Esposito	Mayor of Stamford; 1995–2009	Succeeded by Michael Pavia
Preceded by Jodi Rell	Governor of Connecticut; 2011–2019	Succeeded by Ned Lamont
Party political offices
Preceded by John DeStefano	Democratic nominee for Governor of Connecticut; 2010, 2014	Succeeded by Ned Lamont
Preceded by Steve Bullock	Chair of the Democratic Governors Association; 2015–2017	Succeeded by Jay Inslee
U.S. order of precedence (ceremonial)
Preceded by John G. Rowland as Former Governor	Order of precedence of the United States; Within Connecticut	Succeeded by Jack Markell as Former Governor
Preceded by John G. Rowland as Former Governor	Order of precedence of the United States; Outside Connecticut	Succeeded by Michael Dukakis as Former Governor
