= Thomas C. Foley =

American politician and businessman born (1952)

Tom Foley
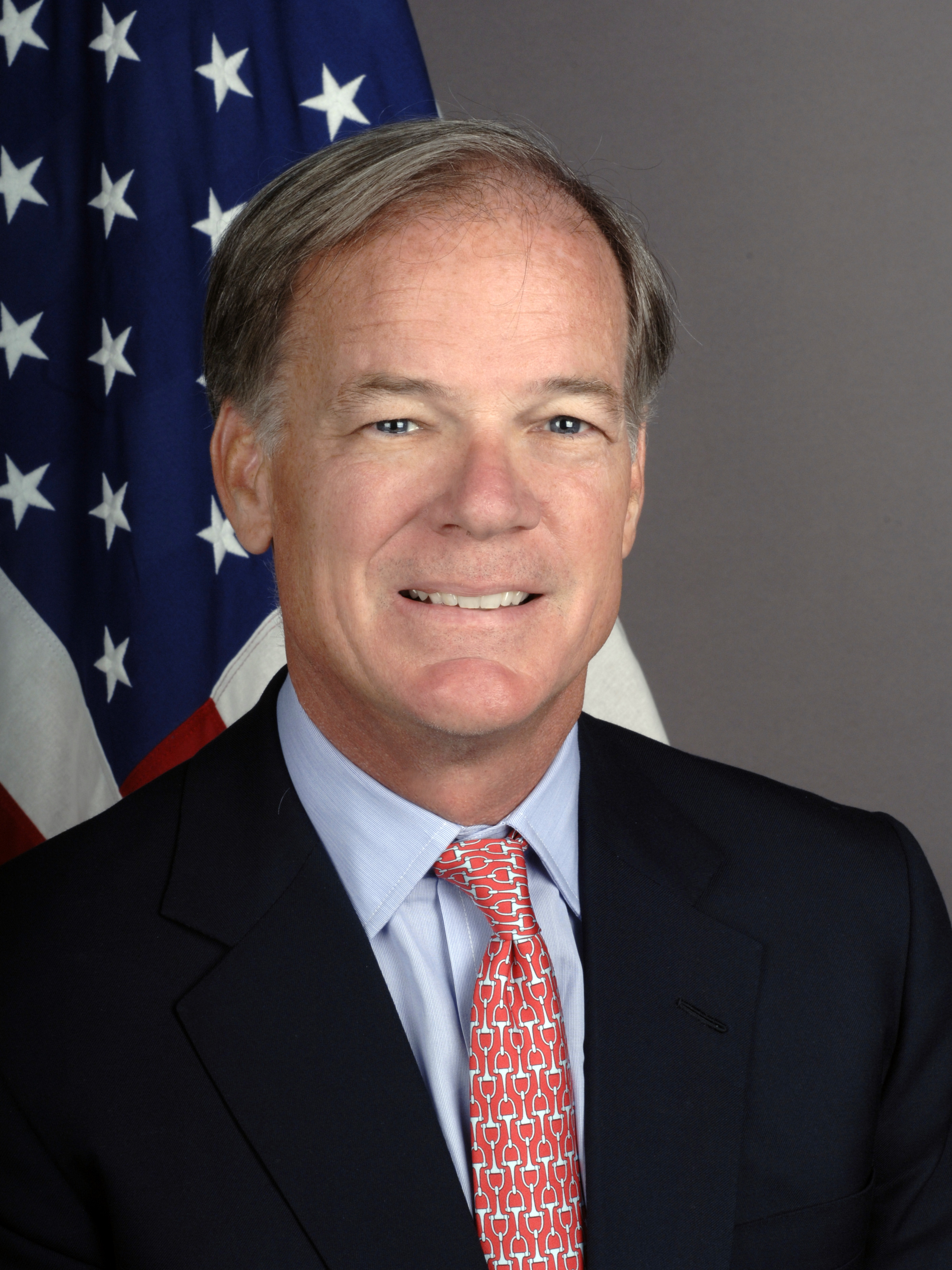
- Official portrait, 2006

United States Ambassador to Ireland
- In office October 18, 2006 – January 20, 2009
- President: George W. Bush
- Preceded by: James Kenny
- Succeeded by: Dan Rooney

Personal details
- Born: Thomas Coleman Foley; January 9, 1952 (age 74) Evanston, Illinois, U.S.
- Party: Republican
- Spouse: Lisa McCowan (m. 1989; div. 1994) Leslie Fahrenkopf (m. 2009)
- Children: 3
- Education: Harvard University (BA, MBA)

Thomas Coleman Foley (born January 9, 1952) is an American politician and businessman. He served as the United States Ambassador to Ireland from 2006 to 2009 and was the unsuccessful Republican nominee for Governor of Connecticut in 2010 and 2014.

== Early life and education ==
Foley was born January 9, 1952 in Evanston, Illinois, one of six children, to Gifford Pinchot Foley (1910–2006), a businessman, and Catherine Foley (née Coleman; 1921–1976).

He went to both Phillips Academy Andover and Kent School (class of 1970) and then received a Bachelor of Arts in Economics from Harvard College and an M.B.A. from Harvard Business School. He is not related to former U.S. House Speaker Tom Foley. At Andover, he played on the football team with New England Patriots head coach Bill Belichick.

== Career ==
=== Private sector ===
Foley first worked at McKinsey & Company and then at Citicorp Venture Capital. He left CVC to found NTC Group, a private investment company, in 1985. That year, NTC Group (also known as National Textile Corp) purchased the Bibb Company in Macon, Georgia. NTC purchased T.B. Woods Sons Company in 1986 and Stevens Aviation in 1989. NTC sold its interest in Bibb in 1996. In April 2007, T.B. Woods was sold to ALTRA Holdings. Woods, a manufacturing company headquartered in Chambersburg, Pennsylvania, had operations in North America, Germany, Italy, and India, 2005 revenue of about $110.9 million and about 830 employees.

NTC principals still own Stevens Aviation, a provider to general aviation operators of fueling and other line services, maintenance, modification, and refurbishment work, as well as aircraft sales. Stevens is headquartered in Greenville, South Carolina. The company also has locations in Dayton, Ohio and Nashville, Tennessee, in addition to its two locations in Greenville.

In 2018, NTC's principals acquired Tenax Aerospace, headquartered in Ridgeland, Mississippi. Tenax leases and operates general aviation aircraft for firefighting and other special mission work, mostly for U.S. Government customers.

In 2020, NTC's principals acquired The Entwistle Company, headquartered in Hudson, Massachusetts. Entwistle manufactures systems and components for Navy ships and other military equipment.

=== Public sector ===
Foley has served in national government twice. From August 2003 through March 2004, Foley served in Iraq as the director of private sector development for the Coalition Provisional Authority. Foley's responsibilities included overseeing most of Iraq's 192 state-owned enterprises, stimulating private sector growth, developing foreign trade and investment, and overseeing three state Ministries. Foley received the Department of Defense Distinguished Public Service Award in June 2004 for his service in Iraq.

From October 2006 to January 2009, Foley was the U.S. Ambassador to Ireland, appointed by President George W. Bush. Foley served as ambassador at a time when U.S. foreign policy was unpopular in Ireland. He directed his public diplomacy efforts mostly toward an improved understanding of U.S. foreign policy goals and shared interests with Ireland.

Foley worked with Robert Tuttle, U.S. Ambassador to the U.K., and special envoy Paula Dobriansky to re-establish the devolved government in Northern Ireland under the Good Friday Agreement and to stimulate investment there. He was present in Belfast on May 8, 2007, when the new government of Northern Ireland was sworn in.

As ambassador, Foley hosted a conference on green technology in Galway and another in Dublin on philanthropy, bringing together experts from the U.S. and their Irish counterparts. He was active in promoting cultural exchange by arranging visits from prominent Irish American artists and performers including Conan O'Brien and former U.S. Poet Laureate Billy Collins.

In its endorsement of Foley for the 2010 Connecticut governor's race, the Irish Voice said, "Foley is a former Ambassador to Ireland who performed great service there and is fondly remembered."

=== 2010 gubernatorial campaign ===
In June, 2009, Foley announced that he would run for the U.S. Senate in 2010 against incumbent Christopher Dodd. However, following the surprise announcement by Republican governor Jodi Rell that she would not seek a second term, Foley announced on December 3, 2009, that he was leaving the Senate race to run for Governor of Connecticut.

On May 22, 2010, Foley received the Republican Party's endorsement at the state convention. Two other candidates, Lieutenant Governor Michael Fedele and Simsbury businessman Nelson "Oz" Griebel, also received sufficient support from delegates to qualify for an August 10, 2010, primary.

In the August 10 state Republican primary, Foley defeated challengers Fedele and Griebel to become the official Republican candidate for governor in 2010.

In the general election, Foley ran against Democrat Dannel Malloy, the former mayor of Stamford. Foley ran on a platform emphasizing his executive and problem-solving experience in the private sector and that he was not a career politician. Early in the campaign he published a "Plan Forward for Connecticut" outlining what he would do to solve Connecticut's biggest problems, including bringing more jobs to the state and closing Connecticut's large budget deficit. Foley also promoted an aggressive plan to improve Connecticut's underperforming inner-city schools.

The New London Day said in their endorsement of Foley, that "he is best suited for the job at hand. The challenges confronting the next governor do not appear to intimidate him. He is pragmatic about what needs to be fixed."

The New Haven Register also endorsed Foley, described him as "the more forthright of the two candidates", and stated that "Foley's record as a business executive is commendable. His business skills in increasing productivity while keeping an eye on cost are needed in the governor's office."

In the general election for governor, Foley received 560,874 votes (48.95%), just short of Democrat Dan Malloy's 567,278 (49.50%) tally, a difference of fewer than 6,500 votes. After nearly a week of uncertainty about the actual vote tally from Bridgeport and several other towns, he conceded defeat on Monday, November 8. Ultimately, Foley spent $11 million of his own money on the race.

=== 2014 gubernatorial campaign ===
Foley won the Republican nomination for governor on May 17, 2014, securing more than 57% of the delegates. He faced Danbury Mayor Mark Boughton and Senate Minority Leader John McKinney of Fairfield in the August primary. Foley said that he and McKinney, his main rival, agreed to forgo any negative campaigning during the primary to avoid weakening the Republicans' general election candidate, and then later accused McKinney of violating that pledge when the campaign took a negative turn. On June 3, 2014, Foley announced that he would accept public financing.

On August 12, 2014, Foley won the primary against McKinney by almost 10,000 votes, winning in every county.

In the general election, Foley promised to solve Connecticut's fiscal crisis without raising taxes. He said he would reduce unnecessary costs and regulatory burdens on employers to stimulate job growth and would reduce the car tax in the state's largest cities. Foley's pledge not to raise taxes forced Governor Malloy to do make the same pledge, but within nine months of the election Governor Malloy signed a bill significantly raising Connecticut taxes both on individuals and businesses.

Foley was criticized by his opponent for paying no federal income tax for 2011 and 2012 and only $673 for 2013. He explained that he typically has no taxable personal income unless one of the companies he owns is sold at a profit, which had not happened in those years. In the 2010 campaign, Foley released tax returns showing he paid federal and state taxes in 2008 and 2009 exceeding $800,000.

In July 2014, Foley gave a press conference criticizing Malloy outside Fusion Paperboard, a paper mill that had just been closed by its owners. Foley defended the owners' decision to close the plant and told the local first selectman and several union leaders, "You want to blame people who are hundreds or thousands of miles away, malign management. Listen, you have failed, because you have lost these jobs." He said that Malloy was to blame because of "anti-business policies... things like mandatory sick leave, raising energy costs, uhhh, just the negative signals he sends out."

Foley's Democratic opponents in the general election initially tried to draw attention to a car accident Foley had in 1981. The state Democratic Party Communications Director who was leading the effort to attract attention to the accident was let go in early 2014 and Foley's opponents’ primary messaging switched to Foley's wealth and that he was out of touch with workers.

The campaign rhetoric between the two candidates was acrimonious. Foley lost the general election to incumbent Dannel Malloy, 507,544 (48.1%) to 537,017 (50.9%).

=== After 2014 ===
Foley endorsed Chris Christie in the 2016 Republican primaries.

== Personal life ==
In 1994, at the age of 42, Foley was suddenly afflicted with Bell's palsy. The condition partly paralyzed the right side of his face. Foley can only smile with the left side of his mouth; his right eye is partially closed.

In 2009, Foley married Leslie Fahrenkopf, who was 41 and vice president for global ethics and compliance and an associate general counsel at News Corporation in New York City at the time of their wedding. From 2003 to 2008, Fahrenkopf had been an associate counsel to President George W. Bush in the Office of White House Counsel. Foley has a son Tom, Jr. (born October 25, 1990) and he and Leslie have boy and girl twins, Grace Quinlan and William Reed (born September 26, 2011).

Diplomatic posts
Preceded by James Kenny	United States Ambassador to Ireland; 2006–2009	Succeeded by Dan Rooney
Party political offices
Preceded by Jodi Rell	Republican nominee for Governor of Connecticut; 2010, 2014	Succeeded by Bob Stefanowski
