= Ann Lamont =

American venture capitalist (born 1956)

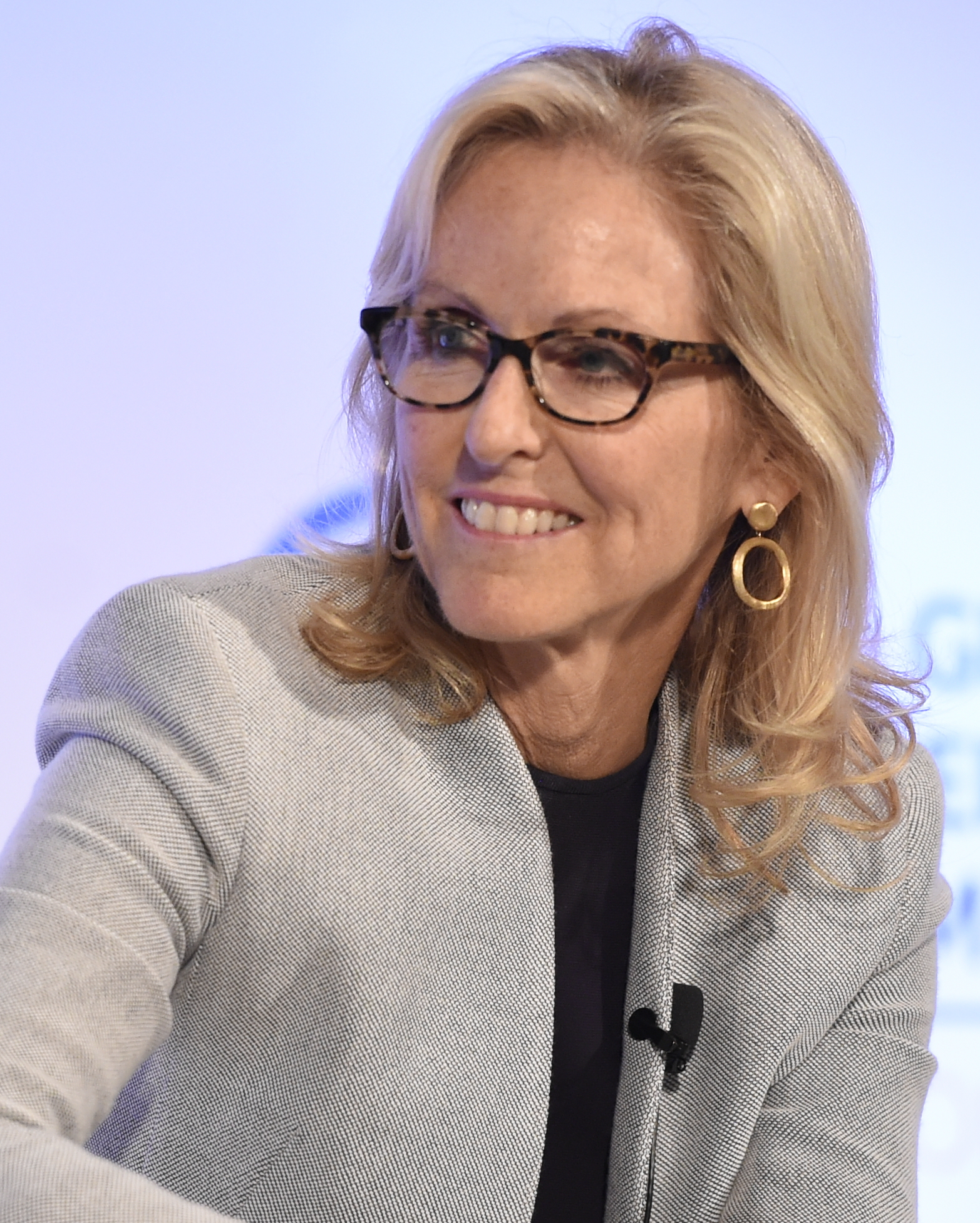
- Lamont in 2016

First Lady of Connecticut
- Current
- Assumed role January 9, 2019
- Governor: Ned Lamont
- Preceded by: Cathy Malloy

Personal details
- Born: Ann Huntress; October 29, 1956 (age 69) Whitefish Bay, Wisconsin, U.S.
- Party: Democratic
- Spouse: Ned Lamont (m. 1983)
- Children: 3
- Education: Stanford University (BA)
- Occupation: Venture capitalist

Ann Lamont (née Huntress; born October 29, 1956) is an American venture capitalist and the First Lady of Connecticut. She is married to Governor of Connecticut Ned Lamont.

== Early life and education ==
Lamont was born in Whitefish Bay, Wisconsin, to Betsy Ann (née Whiteside) and Carroll B. Huntress Jr. She received a bachelor's degree in political science from Stanford University in 1979.

== Career ==
Lamont is co-founder and managing partner of venture capital firm Oak HC/FT, which she founded with Andrew Adams in 2014. In 2026, Oak HC/FT raised nearly $2 billion to invest in healthcare and financial services companies. Lamont has invested in companies including Athenahealth, CareBridge, Chai Discovery, Devoted Health, Fundamental, and Genzyme. She has been included on Forbes Midas List, an annual ranking of venture capital investors, seven times, most recently in 2026.

== Personal life ==
Lamont was married on September 10, 1983, to businessman and politician Ned Lamont. They reside in Greenwich and have three children.
