= 1988 Connecticut Senate election =

1988 Connecticut State Senate election
- November 8, 1988

All 36 seats in the Connecticut State Senate 19 seats needed for a majority
	Majority party	Minority party
Leader	Cornelius O'Leary	Reginald Smith
Party	Democratic	Republican
Leader's seat	7th	8th
Last election	25	11
Seats won	23	13
Seat change	▼2	▲2
Popular vote	680,626	611,751
Percentage	52.51%	47.20%
Swing	▼3.56%	▲3.27%
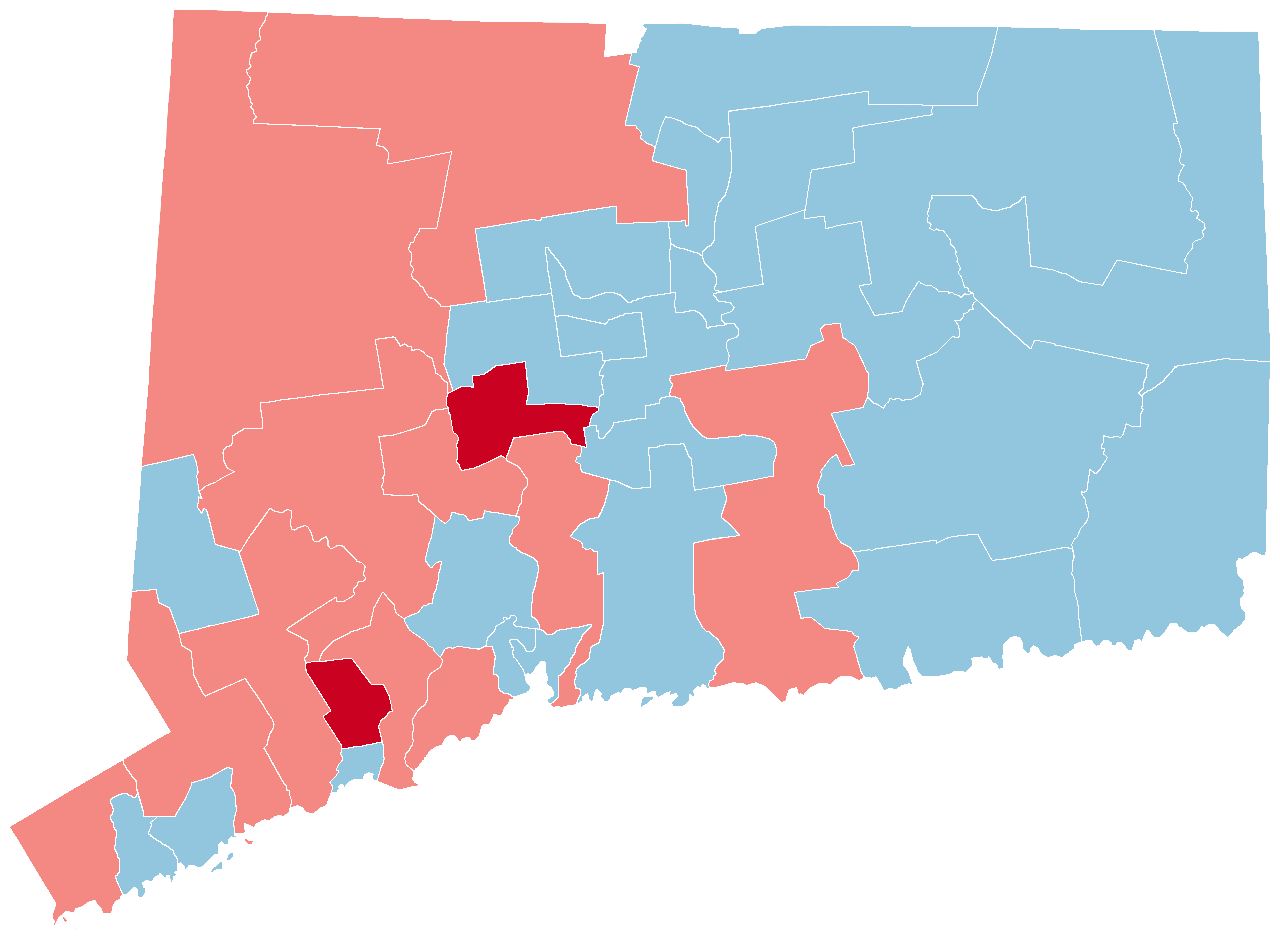
- Results: Democratic hold Republican hold Republican gain
President pro tempore before election
John B. Larson
Democratic
Elected President pro tempore
John B. Larson
Democratic

The 1988 Connecticut State Senate elections took place as a part of the biennial 1988 United States elections. All 36 seats were up for re-election. Senators serve two year terms and are up for re-election every election cycle.

The Democrats retained their majority in the State Senate, having a 23-13 majority over the Republicans, although losing their supermajority.

== Retirements ==
Two incumbents did not seek re-election.

=== Democrats ===
1. District 27: Anthony Truglia retired.

=== Republicans ===
1. District 36: Michael L. Morano retired.

== Incumbents defeated ==
Two incumbents, both Democrats, were defeated in general elections.

=== In general election ===
==== Democrats ====
1. District 16: Donald M. Rinaldi lost re-election to Stephen Somma.
2. District 22: Howard T. Owens Jr. lost re-election to Lee Scarpetti.

== Results ==
Senate seats
Democratic	63.89%
Republican	36.11%

Popular vote
Democratic	52.51%
Republican	47.20%

=== District 1 ===
Connecticut's 1st State Senate district election, 1988
Party	Candidate	Votes	%
Democratic	William A. DiBella (incumbent)	17,744	73.37%
Republican	Patrick L. Kennedy	6,440	26.63%
Total votes		24,184	100.00%
Democratic hold			

=== District 2 ===
Connecticut's 2nd State Senate district election, 1988
Party	Candidate	Votes	%
Democratic	Frank D. Barrows (incumbent)	17,011	72.8%
Republican	Donald A. Jepsen	6,371	27.2%
Total votes		23,382	100.0%
Democratic hold			

=== District 3 ===
Connecticut's 3rd State Senate district election, 1988
Party	Candidate	Votes	%
Democratic	John B. Larson (incumbent)	27,793	72.2%
Republican	Joseph F. Roberts	10,678	27.8%
Total votes		38,471	100.0%
Democratic hold			

=== District 4 ===
Connecticut's 4th State Senate district election, 1988
Party	Candidate	Votes	%
Democratic	Michael Meotti (incumbent)	26,363	57.3%
Republican	Carl A. Zinsser	19,649	42.7%
Total votes		46,012	100.0%
Democratic hold			

=== District 5 ===
Connecticut's 5th State Senate district election, 1988
Party	Candidate	Votes	%
Democratic	Kevin Sullivan (incumbent)	31,821	64.6%
Republican	Robert W. Cornell	17,063	34.6%
Libertarian	Alfred F. Neves	375	0.8%
Total votes		49,259	100.0%
Democratic hold			

=== District 6 ===
Connecticut's 6th State Senate district election, 1988
Party	Candidate	Votes	%
Democratic	Joseph H. Harper Jr. (incumbent)	19,394	70.0%
Republican	Mary Lou Sanders	8,324	30.0%
Total votes		27,718	100.0%
Democratic hold			

=== District 7 ===
Connecticut's 7th State Senate district election, 1988
Party	Candidate	Votes	%
Democratic	Cornelius P. O'Leary (incumbent)	24,888	66.1%
Republican	H. James Anderson	12,740	33.9%
Total votes		37,628	100.0%
Democratic hold			

=== District 8 ===
Connecticut's 8th State Senate district election, 1988
Party	Candidate	Votes	%
Republican	Reginald J. Smith (incumbent)	27,819	61.8%
Democratic	Dwight Schweitzer	17,189	38.2%
Total votes		45,008	100.0%
Republican hold			

=== District 9 ===
Connecticut's 9th State Senate district election, 1988
Party	Candidate	Votes	%
Democratic	Cynthia Matthews (incumbent)	24,772	54.0%
Republican	Dominic Mazzoccoli	21,070	46.0%
Total votes		45,842	100.0%
Democratic hold			

=== District 10 ===
Connecticut's 10th State Senate district election, 1988
Party	Candidate	Votes	%
Democratic	John C. Daniels (incumbent)	19,766	75.8%
Republican	JoAnne C. Satmary	6,314	24.2%
Total votes		26,080	100.0%
Democratic hold			

=== District 11 ===
Connecticut's 11th State Senate district election, 1988
Party	Candidate	Votes	%
Democratic	Anthony Avallone (incumbent)	17,035	62.7%
Republican	Sandy D. Astarita	8,812	32.4%
Green	Joel Schechter	1,335	4.9%
Total votes		27,182	100.0%
Democratic hold			

=== District 12 ===
Connecticut's 12th State Senate district election, 1988
Party	Candidate	Votes	%
Democratic	Thomas J. Sullivan (incumbent)	22,253	53.1%
Republican	Frank J. Forgione	19,673	46.9%
Total votes		41,926	100.0%
Democratic hold			

=== District 13 ===
Connecticut's 13th State Senate district election, 1988
Party	Candidate	Votes	%
Democratic	Amelia Mustone (incumbent)	20,235	61.6%
Republican	Francis R. Barillaro	12,616	38.4%
Total votes		32,851	100.0%
Democratic hold			

=== District 14 ===
Connecticut's 14th State Senate district election, 1988
Party	Candidate	Votes	%
Republican	Tom Scott (incumbent)	24,495	67.4%
Democratic	William Lipman	11,838	32.6%
Total votes		36,333	100.0%
Republican hold			

=== District 15 ===
Connecticut's 15th State Senate district election, 1988
Party	Candidate	Votes	%
Republican	Thomas F. Upson (incumbent)	21,601	62.8%
Democratic	Thomas Carusello	12,774	37.2%
Total votes		34,375	100.0%
Republican hold			

=== District 16 ===
Connecticut's 16th State Senate district election, 1988
Party	Candidate	Votes	%
Republican	Stephen Somma	15,973	51.2%
Democratic	Donald M. Rinaldi (incumbent)	14,900	47.7%
Concerned Citizens Party of Connecticut	Robert Giannamore	202	0.6%
Independent Party	Stella L. Foster	147	0.5%
Total votes		31,222	100.0%
Republican gain from Democratic			

=== District 17 ===
Connecticut's 17th State Senate district election, 1988
Party	Candidate	Votes	%
Democratic	Gary A. Hale (incumbent)	22,427	61.0%
Republican	Jack B. Levine	14,358	39.0%
Total votes		36,785	100.0%
Democratic hold			

=== District 18 ===
Connecticut's 18th State Senate district election, 1988
Party	Candidate	Votes	%
Democratic	Steven Spellman (incumbent)	18,659	57.9%
Republican	Donald E. Schoolcraft	13,563	42.1%
Total votes		32,222	100.0%
Democratic hold			

=== District 19 ===
Connecticut's 19th State Senate district election, 1988
Party	Candidate	Votes	%
Democratic	Kenneth Przybysz (incumbent)	25,233	70.9%
Republican	Raymond S. Milvae	10,363	29.1%
Total votes		35,596	100.0%
Democratic hold			

=== District 20 ===
Connecticut's 20th State Senate district election, 1988
Party	Candidate	Votes	%
Democratic	Mark H. Powers (incumbent)	22,154	57.2%
Republican	Dorothy B. Leib	16,581	42.8%
Total votes		38,735	100.0%
Democratic hold			

=== District 21 ===
Connecticut's 21st State Senate district election, 1988
Party	Candidate	Votes	%
Republican	George Gunther (incumbent)	29,781	76.3%
Democratic	Steven P. Debish	9,249	23.7%
Total votes		39,030	100.0%
Republican hold			

=== District 22 ===
Connecticut's 22nd State Senate district election, 1988
Party	Candidate	Votes	%
Republican	Lee Scarpetti	19,007	51.1%
Democratic	Howard T. Owens Jr. (incumbent)	17,858	48.0%
Independent Party	Fred Radford	321	0.9%
Total votes		37,186	100.0%
Republican gain from Democratic			

=== District 23 ===
Connecticut's 23rd State Senate district election, 1988
Party	Candidate	Votes	%
Democratic	Margaret E. Morton (incumbent)	11,335	68.2%
Republican	Philip L. Smith	5,285	31.8%
Total votes		16,620	100.0%
Democratic hold			

=== District 24 ===
Connecticut's 24th State Senate district election, 1988
Party	Candidate	Votes	%
Democratic	James H. Maloney (incumbent)	18,984	54.5%
Republican	Robert T. Miller	15,515	44.5%
Independent Party	Catherine V. DiBuono	369	1.0%
Total votes		34,868	100.0%
Democratic hold			

=== District 25 ===
Connecticut's 25th State Senate district election, 1988
Party	Candidate	Votes	%
Democratic	John Atkin (incumbent)	18,320	52.8%
Republican	Michael W. Lyons	16,394	47.2%
Total votes		34,714	100.0%
Democratic hold			

=== District 26 ===
Connecticut's 26th State Senate district election, 1988
Party	Candidate	Votes	%
Republican	Judith Freedman (incumbent)	34,877	74.88%
Democratic	George F. Lenz	11,705	25.12%
Total votes		46,582	100.00%
Republican hold			

=== District 27 ===
Connecticut's 27th State Senate district election, 1988
Party	Candidate	Votes	%
Democratic	Richard Blumenthal	21,947	65.9%
Republican	Ted Lewis	11,366	34.1%
Total votes		33,313	100.0%
Democratic hold			

=== District 28 ===
Connecticut's 28th State Senate district election, 1988
Party	Candidate	Votes	%
Republican	Fred Lovegrove (incumbent)	28,279	66.1%
Democratic	Jonathan Kantrowitz	13,843	32.3%
Independent Party	Barbara J. Simon	687	1.6%
Total votes		42,809	100.0%
Republican hold			

=== District 29 ===
Connecticut's 29th State Senate district election, 1988
Party	Candidate	Votes	%
Democratic	Kevin P. Johnston (incumbent)	23,739	71.8%
Republican	John A. Curran Jr.	9,335	28.2%
Total votes		33,074	100.0%
Democratic hold			

=== District 30 ===
Connecticut's 30th State Senate district election, 1988
Party	Candidate	Votes	%
Republican	M. Adela Eads (incumbent)	26,450	63.9%
Democratic	John Logan	14,930	36.1%
Total votes		41,380	100.0%
Republican hold			

=== District 31 ===
Connecticut's 31st State Senate district election, 1988
Party	Candidate	Votes	%
Democratic	Steven C. Casey (incumbent)	23,549	100.0%
Total votes		23,549	100.0%
Democratic hold			

=== District 32 ===
Connecticut's 32nd State Senate district election, 1988
Party	Candidate	Votes	%
Republican	James H. McLaughlin (incumbent)	32,553	78.3%
Democratic	Ignatius Lombardo	9,017	21.7%
Total votes		41,570	100.0%
Republican hold			

=== District 33 ===
Connecticut's 33rd State Senate district election, 1988
Party	Candidate	Votes	%
Republican	Kenneth T. Hampton	23,399	52.9%
Democratic	Marilyn Piurek	20,840	47.1%
Total votes		44,239	100.0%
Republican hold			

=== District 34 ===
Connecticut's 34th State Senate district election, 1988
Party	Candidate	Votes	%
Republican	Philip S. Robertson	24,584	61.4%
Democratic	Jim Greco	15,179	37.9%
Independent Party	Joseph A. Caprio	263	0.7%
Total votes		40,026	100.0%
Republican hold			

=== District 35 ===
Connecticut's 35th State Senate district election, 1988
Party	Candidate	Votes	%
Democratic	Marie Herbst (incumbent)	22,777	60.6%
Republican	James D. Giulietti	14,802	39.4%
Total votes		37,579	100.0%
Democratic hold			

=== District 36 ===
Connecticut's 36th State Senate district election, 1988
Party	Candidate	Votes	%
Republican	Emil Benvenuto	25,621	66.16%
Democratic	Peter Gasparino	13,105	33.84%
Total votes		38,726	100.00%
Republican hold			
