= 1990 Connecticut Senate election =

1990 Connecticut State Senate election
- November 6, 1990

All 36 seats in the Connecticut State Senate 19 seats needed for a majority
	Majority party	Minority party
Leader	Cornelius O'Leary	Reginald Smith (retired)
Party	Democratic	Republican
Leader's seat	7th	8th
Last election	23	13
Seats before	23	12
Seats won	20	16
Seat change	▼3	▲4
	Third party
Leader	Emil Benvenuto (lost-reelection)
Party	A Connecticut
Leader's seat	36th
Last election	0
Seats before	1
Seats won	0
Seat change	▼1
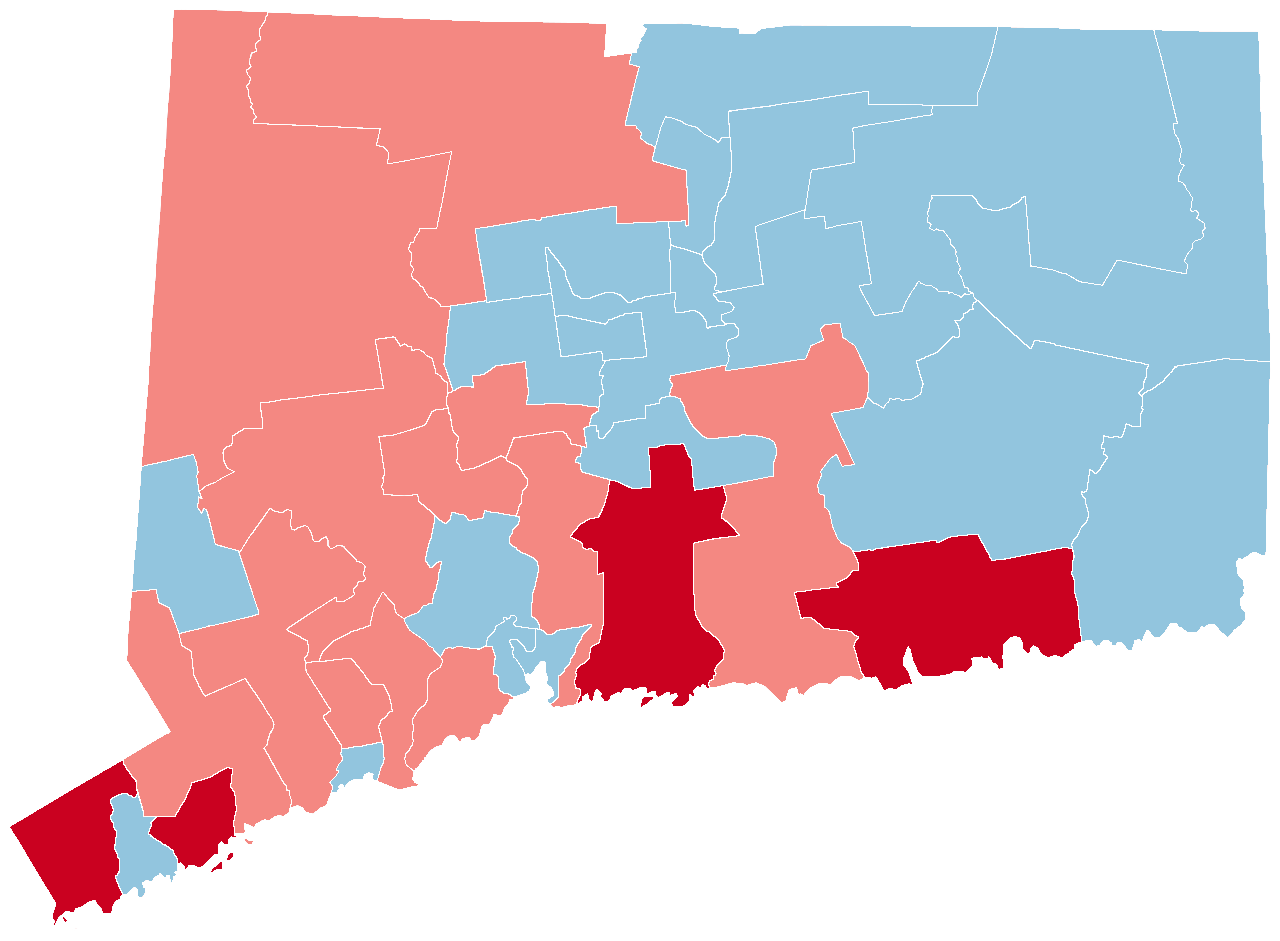
- Results: Democratic hold Republican hold Republican gain
President pro tempore before election
John B. Larson
Democratic
Elected President pro tempore
John B. Larson
Democratic

The 1990 Connecticut State Senate elections took place as part of the biennial 1990 United States elections. All 36 seats were up for re-election. Senators serve two-year terms and are up for re-election every election cycle.

The Democrats lost 3 seats, while the Republicans gained 4 seats, with the Democrats ultimately maintaining their majority in the Senate.

These elections also saw the attempt of Greenwich selectman and future governor Ned Lamont's attempt to win in the 36th district, but he lost to Republican William H. Nickerson after Republican Senator Emil Benvenuto, who had switched to the A Connecticut Party, also lost to him.

== Retirements ==
Six incumbents did not seek re-election.

=== Democrats ===
1. District 20: Mark H. Powers retired.
2. District 27: Richard Blumenthal retired to successfully run for Attorney General.

=== Republican ===
1. District 8: Reginald J. Smith retired. (Previously ran for governor)
2. District 14: Tom Scott retired to unsuccessfully run for Connecticut's 3rd congressional district against Rosa DeLauro.
3. District 32: James H. McLaughlin retired to unsuccessfully run for Connecticut's 5th congressional district.
4. District 33: Kenneth T. Hampton retired.

== Incumbents defeated ==
Three incumbents were defeated in general elections.

=== In general election ===
==== A Connecticut ====
1. District 36: Emil Benvenuto lost re-election to Republican William H. Nickerson after he had switched from Republican to the A Connecticut Party.

==== Democrats ====
1. District 25: John Atkin lost re-election to Robert Genuario.
2. District 12: Thomas J. Sullivan lost re-election to William Aniskovich.

== Results ==
=== District 1 ===
Connecticut's 1st State Senate district election, 1990
Party	Candidate	Votes	%
Democratic	William A. DiBella (incumbent)	12,363	100.00%
Total votes		12,363	100.00%
Democratic hold			

=== District 2 ===
September 11, 1990 Democratic primary
Party	Candidate	Votes	%
Democratic	Frank D. Barrows (incumbent)	2,655	54.79%
Democratic	Wilber G. Smith	2,191	45.21%
Total votes		4,846	100.00%

Connecticut's 2nd State Senate district election, 1990
Party	Candidate	Votes	%
Democratic	Frank D. Barrows (incumbent)	10,566	60.6%
Republican	Mary K. Drost	6,871	39.4%
Total votes		17,437	100.0%
Democratic hold			

=== District 3 ===
Connecticut's 3rd State Senate district election, 1990
Party	Candidate	Votes	%
Democratic	John B. Larson (incumbent)	21,307	68.8%
Republican	Debra M. Gaudette	9,672	31.2%
Total votes		30,979	100.0%
Democratic hold			

=== District 4 ===
Connecticut's 4th State Senate district election, 1990
Party	Candidate	Votes	%
Democratic	Michael Meotti (incumbent)	24,465	65.3%
Republican	Sonya Googins	12,998	34.7%
Total votes		37,463	100.0%
Democratic hold			

=== District 5 ===
Connecticut's 5th State Senate district election, 1990
Party	Candidate	Votes	%
Democratic	Kevin Sullivan (incumbent)	26,372	65.58%
Republican	Douglas T. Putnam	13,421	33.37%
Libertarian	Alfred F. Neves	424	1.05%
Total votes		40,217	100.00%
Democratic hold			

=== District 6 ===
Connecticut's 6th State Senate district election, 1990
Party	Candidate	Votes	%
Democratic	Joseph H. Harper Jr. (incumbent)	14,366	100.00%
Total votes		14,366	100.00%
Democratic hold			

=== District 7 ===
Connecticut's 7th State Senate district election, 1990
Party	Candidate	Votes	%
Democratic	Cornelius O'Leary (incumbent)	20,054	90.1%
Libertarian	Robert S. Loomis	2,204	9.9%
Total votes		22,258	100.0%
Democratic hold			

=== District 8 ===
Connecticut's 8th State Senate district election, 1990
Party	Candidate	Votes	%
Republican	James T. Fleming	21,872	59.4%
Democratic	David Baram	14,981	40.7%
Total votes		36,853	100.0%
Republican hold			

=== District 9 ===
Connecticut's 9th State Senate district election, 1990
Party	Candidate	Votes	%
Democratic	Cynthia Matthews (incumbent)	21,094	58.5%
Republican	Lawrence J. Ebner	14,958	41.5%
Total votes		36,052	100.0%
Democratic hold			

=== District 26 ===
Connecticut's 26th State Senate district election, 1990
Party	Candidate	Votes	%
Republican	Judith Freedman (incumbent)	26,527	100.00%
Total votes		26,527	100.00%
Republican hold			

=== District 36 ===
The 36th district consisted of all of Greenwich and the northwestern parts of Stamford. It hadn't elected a Democrat as its State Senator since its creation in 1942. The last time a Democratic candidate for state senate won a district representing Greenwich was H. Allen Barton in 1930.

On May 23, 1990, Emil Benvenuto endorsed A Connecticut Party candidate Lowell Weicker for governor. This outraged the state Republican Party and the Greenwich Republican Town Committee (RTC), which actively began seeking a candidate to replace Benvenuto. On July 10, state representative William H. Nickerson announced his candidacy for the seat. Benvenuto initially sought to run for re-election as a Republican, with the town convention supposed to take place on July 23. However, Benvenuto needed the support of at least six delegates (or 20%) of the RTC's 27 delegates to force a September 11 primary against Nickerson, but ended up only having the support of four or five delegates. On July 16, Benvenuto announced his withdrawal from the primary and that he would run on Weicker's A Connecticut Party ticket.

Connecticut's 36th State Senate district election, 1990
Party	Candidate	Votes	%
Republican	William H. Nickerson	12,588	42.88%
A Connecticut Party	Emil Benvenuto (incumbent)	9,488	32.32%
Democratic	Ned Lamont	7,278	24.80%
Total votes		29,354	100.00%
Republican gain from A Connecticut Party			

==== Results by district ====
Results by district
District	Nickerson Republican		Benvenuto A Connecticut		Lamont Democratic		Total
District	Votes	%	Votes	%	Votes	%	Total
Greenwich	8,594	40.39%	7,631	35.86%	5,055	23.75%	21,280
1	637	37.96%	572	34.09%	469	27.95%	1,678
2	347	52.10%	168	25.23%	151	22.67%	666
2A	219	32.06%	316	46.27%	148	21.67%	683
3	155	27.38%	238	42.05%	173	30.57%	566
3A	68	23.53%	125	43.25%	96	33.22%	289
4	270	31.25%	309	35.76%	285	32.99%	864
4A	167	31.27%	226	42.32%	141	26.41%	534
5	778	39.43%	692	35.07%	503	25.50%	1,973
6	770	39.43%	640	32.77%	543	27.80%	1,953
7	824	53.13%	390	25.14%	337	21.73%	1,551
7A	118	39.20%	93	30.90%	90	29.90%	301
8	750	31.32%	1,120	46.76%	525	21.92%	2,395
9	653	35.74%	712	38.97%	462	25.29%	1,827
10	1,002	57.06%	391	22.27%	363	20.67%	1,756
11	878	61.31%	295	20.60%	259	18.09%	1,432
11A	414	57.98%	192	26.89%	108	15.13%	714
12	241	24.49%	569	57.83%	174	17.68%	984
12A	303	27.20%	583	52.33%	228	20.47%	1,114
Stamford	3,994	49.47%	1,857	23.00%	2,223	27.53%	8,074
Totals	12,588	42.88%	9,488	32.32%	7,278	24.80%	29,354
