= 1984 Connecticut Senate election =

1984 Connecticut State Senate election
- November 6, 1984

All 36 seats in the Connecticut State Senate 19 seats needed for a majority

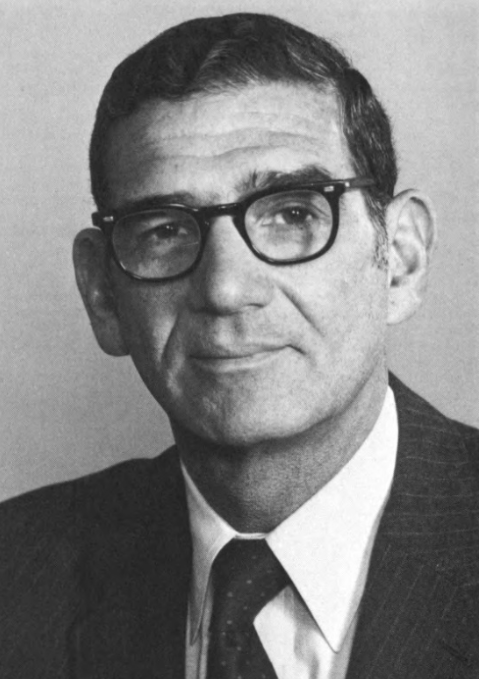
	Majority party	Minority party
Leader	Philip Robertson	Richard Schneller (retired)
Party	Republican	Democratic
Leader's seat	34th	20th
Last election	13	23
Seats before	13	22
Seats won	24	12
Seat change	▲11	▼10
Popular vote	779,216	623,619
Percentage	55.27%	44.24%
Swing	▲10.44%	▼10.74%
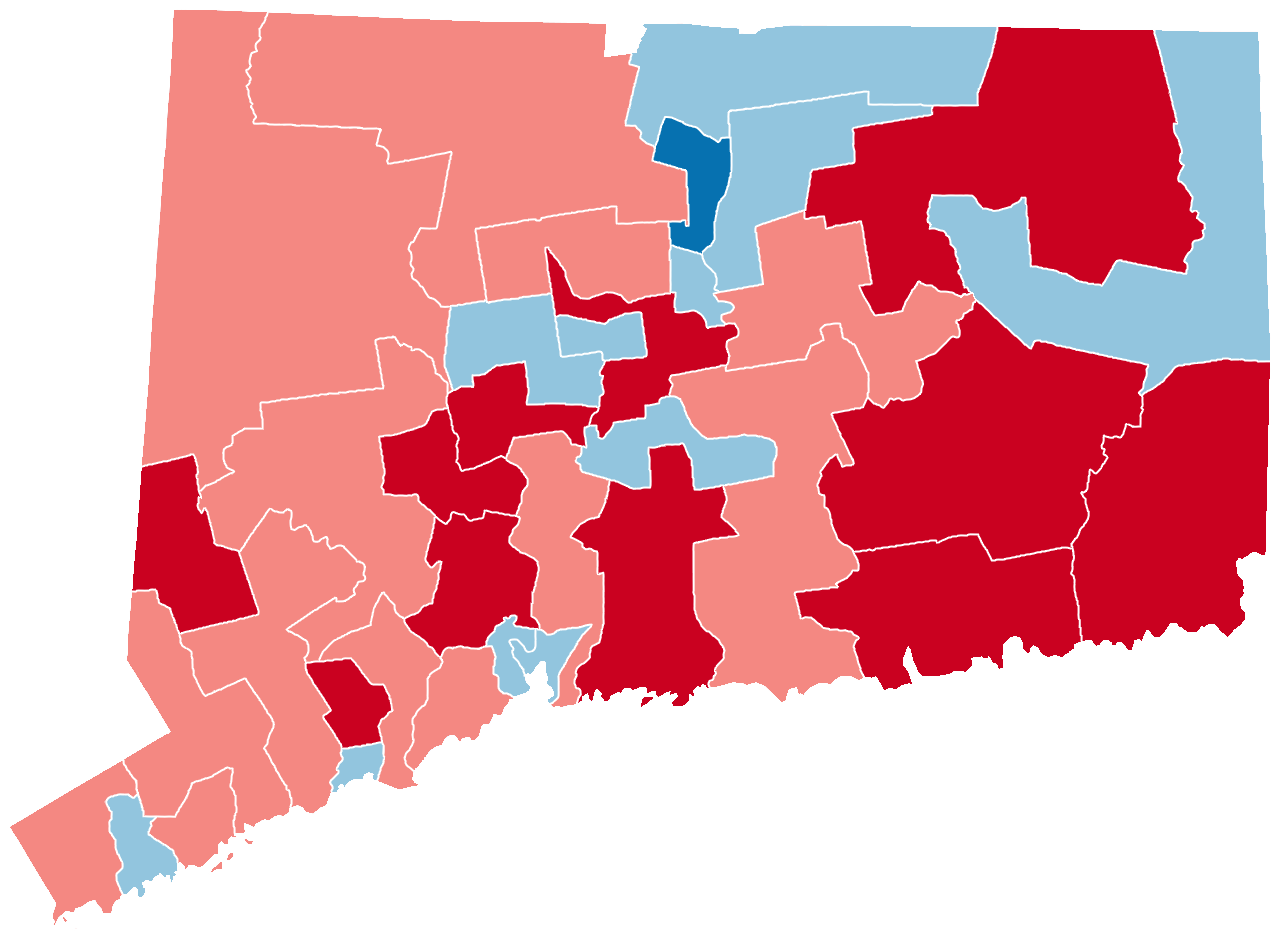
- Results: Democratic hold Democratic gain Republican hold Republican gain
President pro tempore before election
James J. Murphy, Jr.
Democratic
Elected President pro tempore
Philip Robertson
Republican

The 1984 Connecticut State Senate elections took place as a part of the biennial 1984 United States elections. All 36 seats were up for re-election. Senators serve two year terms and are up for re-election every election cycle.

Mainly with the help of Reagan's coattails, as he had won Connecticut by twenty-one points on the same ballot, the Republicans took control of the Senate, managing to secure a two-thirds supermajority over the Democrats, although failing to secure a supermajority in the state house.

== Retirements ==
Three incumbents did not seek re-election.

=== Democrats ===
1. District 18: Mary A. Martin retired.
2. District 20: Richard F. Schneller retired.

=== Republican ===
1. District 32: William "Bill" F. Rogers III retired.

== Special elections ==
Two special elections occurred between 1982 and the general election in 1984. One was held on May 2, 1983, for Democratic Senator Audrey P. Beck's seat in the 29th district after she committed suicide on March 12, 1983. Five-term Democratic state representative Kevin P. Johnston managed to beat Republican lawyer and former Windham selectman candidate Dennis Gamache 57% to 43%, holding the seat Democratic.

Another was held for the 27th district after Democratic Senator Thom Serrani resigned when he was elected Mayor of Stamford. On February 21, 1984, Democrat state representative Anthony Truglia beat Republican candidate Marie Hawe 63% to 37%.

== Incumbents defeated ==
Ten incumbents were defeated in general elections.

=== In general election ===
==== Independents ====
1. District 2: Wilber G. Smith lost re-election to Democrat Frank D. Barrows after he had switched from Democratic to Independent.

==== Democrats ====
1. District 9: Cynthia Matthews lost re-election to Richard B. Johnston.
2. District 12: Regina R. Smith lost re-election to Richard S. Eaton.
3. District 15: Robert G. Dorr lost re-election to Thomas F. Upson.
4. District 16: William J. Sullivan lost re-election to Joseph Markley.
5. District 17: Eugene A. Skowronski lost re-election to John F. Consoli.
6. District 19: James J. Murphy Jr. lost re-election to Eric R. Benson.
7. District 22: Howard T. Owens Jr. lost re-election to Lee Scarpetti.
8. District 24: Wayne A. Baker lost re-election to Robert T. Miller.
9. District 35: Michael J. Skelley lost re-election to James D. Giulietti.

== Results ==
Senate seats
Republican	66.67%
Democratic	33.33%

Popular vote
Republican	55.27%
Democratic	44.24%

=== District 1 ===
Connecticut's 1st State Senate district election, 1984
Party	Candidate	Votes	%
Democratic	William DiBella (incumbent)	20,161	68.2%
Republican	Donald B. LaCroix	9,411	31.8%
Total votes		29,572	100.0%
Democratic hold			

=== District 2 ===
Incumbent Democrat Wilber G. Smith had many past quarrels with the Hartford Democratic Party leadership, challenging its city council with his own "Neighborhood Slate" for election in 1983. Many in the party viewed Smith as "divisive", and sought to nominate Frank D. Barrows, a relatively unknown party organizer who was deemed as more "cooperative" with the party. Hartford mayor Thirman Milner, who Smith was a close advisor to, supported the incumbent Senator.

The Democratic convention on July 24 ended up being a dramatic defeat for Smith, who received only four (or 8.5%) votes out of the total 47 delegates voting, failing to meet the 10 vote (or 20%) threshold to force a primary. The vote was a clear sign of the delegates' irritation with Smith, with Barrows receiving 32 (or 68%) of the total delegate vote, winning the nomination outright. Soon after, Smith announced his campaign for re-election as an independent.

Democratic convention, July 24
Candidate	Round 1	
Candidate	Votes	%
Frank D. Barrows	32	68.08%
Renelle Staton	6	12.77%
Bernard Crowley	5	10.64%
Wilber G. Smith	4	8.51%
Inactive Ballots	0 ballots	

Connecticut's 2nd State Senate district election, 1984
Party	Candidate	Votes	%
Democratic	Frank D. Barrows	13,568	48.31%
Republican	Mark J. Fernandez	8,283	29.49%
Petitioning Candidate	Wilber G. Smith (incumbent)	6,235	22.20%
Total votes		28,086	100.00%
Democratic gain from Independent			

=== District 3 ===
Connecticut's 3rd State Senate district election, 1984
Party	Candidate	Votes	%
Democratic	John B. Larson (incumbent)	21,635	55.2%
Republican	Kathleen O'Leary McGuire	17,553	44.8%
Total votes		39,188	100.0%
Democratic hold			

=== District 4 ===
Connecticut's 4th State Senate district election, 1984
Party	Candidate	Votes	%
Republican	Carl A. Zinsser (incumbent)	24,759	54.4%
Democratic	Steve Cassano	20,721	45.6%
Total votes		45,480	100.0%
Republican hold			

=== District 5 ===
Connecticut's 5th State Senate district election, 1984
Party	Candidate	Votes	%
Republican	Anne Streeter (incumbent)	33,240	64.9%
Democratic	Raymond D. Shea	17,977	35.1%
Total votes		51,217	100.0%
Republican hold			

=== District 6 ===
Connecticut's 6th State Senate district election, 1984
Party	Candidate	Votes	%
Democratic	Joseph H. Harper Jr. (incumbent)	18,324	57.3%
Republican	Alan L. Robertson Jr.	13,649	42.7%
Total votes		31,973	100.0%
Democratic hold			

=== District 7 ===
Connecticut's 7th State Senate district election, 1984
Party	Candidate	Votes	%
Democratic	Cornelius O'Leary (incumbent)	21,246	54.4%
Republican	Mary F. Hardin	17,781	45.6%
Total votes		39,027	100.0%
Democratic hold			

=== District 8 ===
Connecticut's 8th State Senate district election, 1984
Party	Candidate	Votes	%
Republican	Reginald J. Smith (incumbent)	28,967	63.3%
Democratic	George G. Gentile	16,771	36.7%
Total votes		45,738	100.0%
Republican hold			

=== District 9 ===
Connecticut's 9th State Senate district election, 1984
Party	Candidate	Votes	%
Republican	Richard B. Johnston	23,716	50.8%
Democratic	Cynthia Matthews (incumbent)	22,933	49.2%
Total votes		46,649	100.0%
Republican gain from Democratic			

=== District 10 ===
Connecticut's 10th State Senate district election, 1984
Party	Candidate	Votes	%
Democratic	John C. Daniels (incumbent)	20,885	66.8%
Republican	Caroline A. Dinegar	10,395	33.2%
Total votes		31,280	100.0%
Democratic hold			

=== District 11 ===
Connecticut's 11th State Senate district election, 1984
Party	Candidate	Votes	%
Democratic	Anthony V. Avallone (incumbent)	20,103	60.8%
Republican	Frank DePino	12,963	39.2%
Total votes		33,066	100.0%
Democratic hold			

=== District 12 ===
Connecticut's 12th State Senate district election, 1984
Party	Candidate	Votes	%
Republican	Richard S. Eaton	23,687	55.2%
Democratic	Regina R. Smith (incumbent)	19,231	44.8%
Total votes		42,918	100.0%
Republican gain from Democratic			

=== District 13 ===
Connecticut's 13th State Senate district election, 1984
Party	Candidate	Votes	%
Democratic	Amelia Mustone (incumbent)	19,282	52.0%
Republican	Robert B. Treloar Jr.	17,126	46.2%
Petitioning Candidate	John Francis	657	1.8%
Total votes		37,065	100.0%
Democratic hold			

=== District 14 ===
Connecticut's 14th State Senate district election, 1984
Party	Candidate	Votes	%
Republican	Tom Scott (incumbent)	28,758	69.5%
Democratic	James Amann	12,653	30.5%
Total votes		41,411	100.0%
Republican hold			

=== District 15 ===
Connecticut's 15th State Senate district election, 1984
Party	Candidate	Votes	%
Republican	Thomas F. Upson	22,967	59.4%
Democratic	Robert G. Dorr (incumbent)	15,730	40.6%
Total votes		38,697	100.0%
Republican gain from Democratic			

=== District 16 ===
Connecticut's 16th State Senate district election, 1984
Party	Candidate	Votes	%
Republican	Joseph C. Markley	18,708	52.5%
Democratic	William J. Sullivan (incumbent)	16,909	47.5%
Total votes		35,617	100.0%
Republican gain from Democratic			

=== District 17 ===
Connecticut's 17th State Senate district election, 1984
Party	Candidate	Votes	%
Republican	John F. Consoli	21,609	52.4%
Democratic	Eugene A. Skowronski (incumbent)	19,595	47.6%
Total votes		41,204	100.0%
Republican gain from Democratic			

=== District 18 ===
Connecticut's 18th State Senate district election, 1984
Party	Candidate	Votes	%
Republican	Donald Schoolcraft	19,333	57.3%
Democratic	Timothy D. Bates	14,427	42.7%
Total votes		33,760	100.0%
Republican gain from Democratic			

=== District 19 ===
Connecticut's 19th State Senate district election, 1984
Party	Candidate	Votes	%
Republican	Eric H. Benson	18,741	51.9%
Democratic	James J. Murphy Jr. (incumbent)	17,377	48.1%
Total votes		36,118	100.0%
Republican gain from Democratic			

=== District 20 ===
Connecticut's 20th State Senate district election, 1984
Party	Candidate	Votes	%
Republican	Pierce F. Connair	20,514	51.0%
Democratic	Patricia Hendel	19,684	49.0%
Total votes		40,198	100.0%
Republican gain from Democratic			

=== District 21 ===
Connecticut's 21st State Senate district election, 1984
Party	Candidate	Votes	%
Republican	George Gunther (incumbent)	30,691	73.4%
Democratic	Albert C. Cioffari	11,103	26.6%
Total votes		41,794	100.0%
Republican hold			

=== District 22 ===
Connecticut's 22nd State Senate district election, 1984
Party	Candidate	Votes	%
Republican	Lee Scarpetti	20,923	50.4%
Democratic	Howard T. Owens Jr. (incumbent)	20,589	49.6%
Total votes		41,512	100.0%
Republican gain from Democratic			

=== District 23 ===
Connecticut's 23rd State Senate district election, 1984
Party	Candidate	Votes	%
Democratic	Margaret E. Morton (incumbent)	13,701	59.8%
Republican	Rafael Segarra	9,207	40.2%
Total votes		22,908	100.0%
Democratic hold			

=== District 24 ===
Connecticut's 24th State Senate district election, 1984
Party	Candidate	Votes	%
Republican	Robert T. Miller	20,538	54.7%
Democratic	Wayne A. Baker (incumbent)	17,039	45.3%
Total votes		37,577	100.0%
Republican gain from Democratic			

=== District 25 ===
Connecticut's 25th State Senate district election, 1984
Party	Candidate	Votes	%
Republican	Andrew J. Santaniello Jr. (incumbent)	25,798	66.4%
Democratic	Ram H. Hingorani	13,051	33.6%
Total votes		38,849	100.0%
Republican hold			

=== District 26 ===
Connecticut's 26th State Senate district election, 1984
Party	Candidate	Votes	%
Republican	John G. Matthews (incumbent)	34,950	71.3%
Democratic	Adam J. Freeman	14,057	28.7%
Total votes		49,007	100.0%
Republican hold			

=== District 27 ===
Connecticut's 27th State Senate district election, 1984
Party	Candidate	Votes	%
Democratic	Anthony D. Truglia	19,617	50.6%
Republican	Grace Guroian	19,160	49.4%
Total votes		38,777	100.0%
Democratic hold			

=== District 28 ===
Connecticut's 28th State Senate district election, 1984
Party	Candidate	Votes	%
Republican	Fred Lovegrove (incumbent)	31,817	68.4%
Democratic	Laurence Sarezky	14,717	31.6%
Total votes		46,534	100.0%
Republican hold			

=== District 29 ===
Connecticut's 29th State Senate district election, 1984
Party	Candidate	Votes	%
Democratic	Kevin P. Johnston	19,530	55.8%
Republican	Charles T. Manley	15,490	44.2%
Total votes		35,020	100.0%
Democratic hold			

=== District 30 ===
Connecticut's 30th State Senate district election, 1984
Party	Candidate	Votes	%
Republican	M. Adela Eads (incumbent)	28,324	65.8%
Democratic	Harold D. Hansen	14,709	34.2%
Total votes		43,033	100.0%
Republican hold			

=== District 31 ===
Connecticut's 31st State Senate district election, 1984
Party	Candidate	Votes	%
Democratic	Steven C. Casey (incumbent)	22,372	62.0%
Republican	Michael S. Lacouture	13,688	38.0%
Total votes		36,060	100.0%
Democratic hold			

=== District 32 ===
Connecticut's 32nd State Senate district election, 1984
Party	Candidate	Votes	%
Republican	Jamie McLaughlin	31,029	73.7%
Democratic	Ronald M. Sullivan	11,066	26.3%
Total votes		42,095	100.0%
Republican hold			

=== District 33 ===
Connecticut's 33rd State Senate district election, 1984
Party	Candidate	Votes	%
Republican	Kenneth T. Hampton (incumbent)	25,731	58.3%
Democratic	Stephen M. Davis	18,434	41.7%
Total votes		44,165	100.0%
Republican hold			

=== District 34 ===
Connecticut's 34th State Senate district election, 1984
Party	Candidate	Votes	%
Republican	Philip S. Robertson (incumbent)	28,678	67.6%
Democratic	Bernard G. Diana	13,767	32.4%
Total votes		42,445	100.0%
Republican hold			

=== District 35 ===
Connecticut's 35th State Senate district election, 1984
Party	Candidate	Votes	%
Republican	James D. Giulietti	19,358	52.5%
Democratic	Michael J. Skelley (incumbent)	17,546	47.5%
Total votes		36,904	100.0%
Republican gain from Democratic			

=== District 36 ===
Connecticut's 36th State Senate district election, 1984
Party	Candidate	Votes	%
Republican	Michael L. Morano (incumbent)	31,674	70.7%
Democratic	Betsy Gooch	13,109	29.3%
Total votes		44,783	100.0%
Republican hold			
