= 1982 Connecticut Senate election =

1982 Connecticut State Senate election

1982 Connecticut State Senate election
- November 2, 1982

All 36 seats in the Connecticut State Senate 19 seats needed for a majority
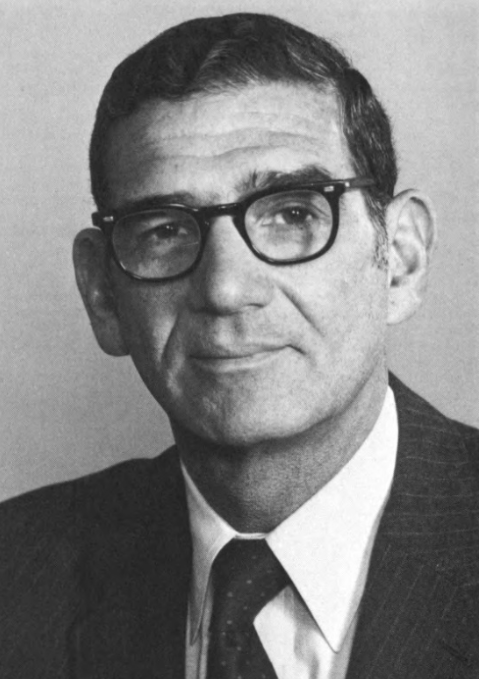

	Majority party	Minority party
Leader	Richard Schneller	George Gunther
Party	Democratic	Republican
Leader's seat	20th	21st
Last election	23	13
Seats won	23	13
Seat change	Steady	Steady
Popular vote	574,592	468,465
Percentage	54.98%	44.82%
Swing	▲4.42%	▼4.61%
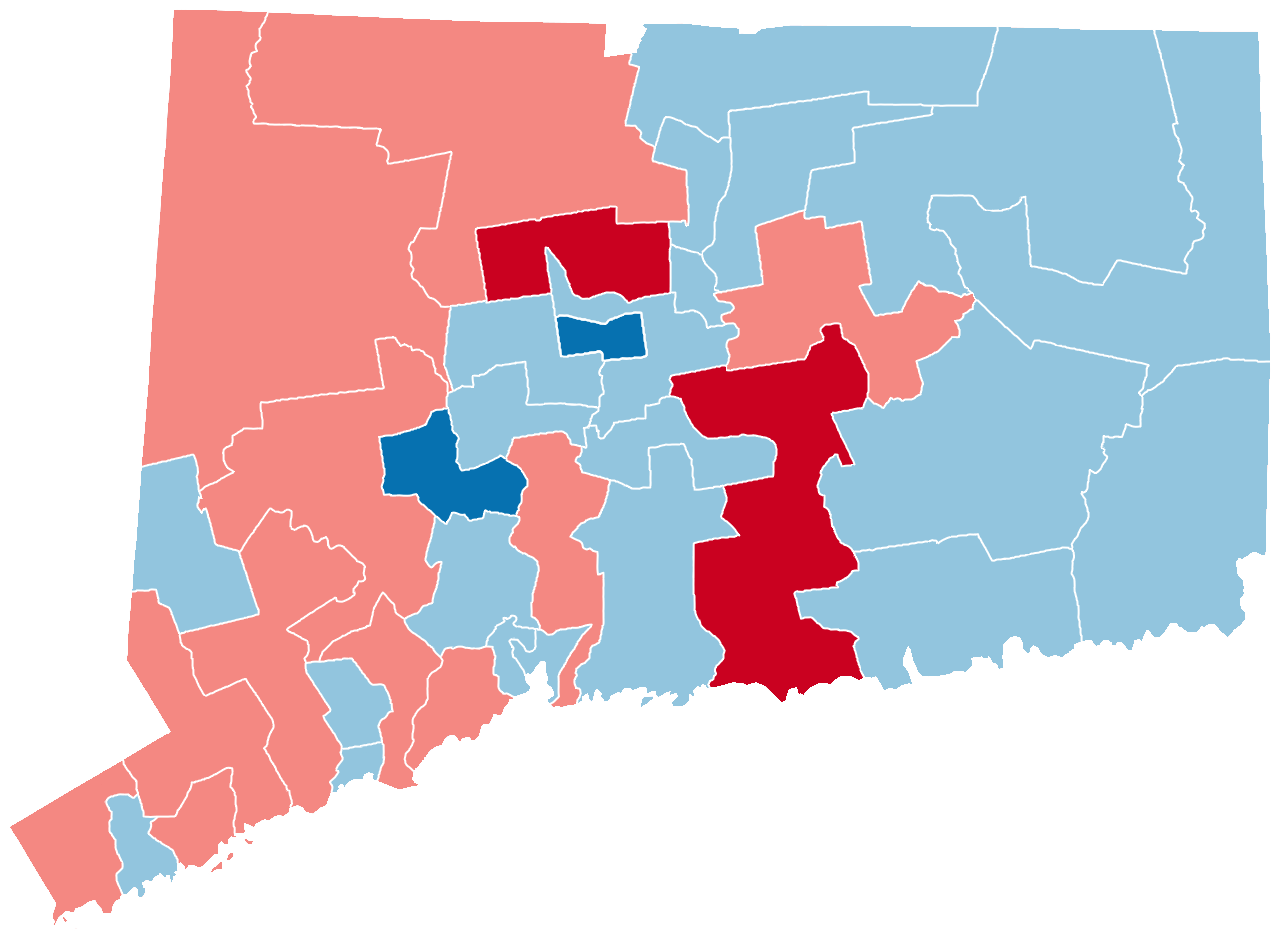
- Results: Democratic hold Democratic gain Republican hold Republican gain
President pro tempore before election
James J. Murphy Jr.
Democratic
Elected President pro tempore
James J. Murphy Jr.
Democratic

The 1982 Connecticut State Senate elections took place as a part of the biennial 1982 United States elections. All 36 seats were up for re-election. Senators serve two year terms and are up for re-election every election cycle.

While both parties gained and lost seats, neither had a net-change, leading to the Democrats maintaining their 23-13 majority over the Republicans.

Immediately following the elections, Republican Senate minority leader George Gunther was ousted and replaced with Philip S. Robertson.

== Retirements ==
Eight incumbents did not seek re-election.

=== Democrats ===
1. District 5: Clifton A. Leonhardt retired to run for Connecticut's 6th congressional district. (Later withdrew).
2. District 9: Bill Curry retired to unsuccessfully run for Connecticut's 6th congressional district against Nancy Johnson.
3. District 11: Anthony M. Ciarlone retired.

=== Republican ===
1. District 6: Nancy Johnson retired to successfully run for Connecticut's 6th congressional district against Bill Curry.
2. District 8: Russell L. Post Jr. retired to run for governor. (Later withdrew).
3. District 15: Gerald Labriola retired to unsuccessfully run for lieutenant governor of Connecticut.
4. District 25: Alfred Santaniello Jr. retired.
5. District 28: Myron R. Ballen retired.

== Special elections ==
On December 31, 1980, Connecticut Governor Ella Grasso was forced to resign due to health issues after she was diagnosed with cancer. Her lieutenant, William A. O'Neill succeeded her as governor. According to Connecticut law, the President pro tempore of the Senate, at the time of which was Joseph J. Fauliso, would automatically assume the office of lieutenant governor once vacant. This left his seat, the 1st district, vacant, creating a special election.

On February 17, 1981, freshman Democratic state-representative William A. DiBella beat Republican Donald B. LaCroix, 76.8% to 23.2%, holding the seat Democratic.

== Incumbents defeated ==
=== In primary election ===
==== Democrats ====
1. District 3: Marcella Fahey lost renomination to John B. Larson.

=== In general election ===
==== Democrats ====
1. District 33: Frederick R. Knous lost re-election to Kenneth T. Hampton.

== Results ==
Senate seats
Democratic	63.89%
Republican	36.11%

Popular vote
Democratic	54.98%
Republican	44.82%

=== District 1 ===
Connecticut's 1st State Senate district election, 1982
Party	Candidate	Votes	%
Democratic	William A. DiBella (incumbent)	16,767	100.00%
Total votes		16,767	100.00%
Democratic hold			

=== District 2 ===
Connecticut's 2nd State Senate district election, 1982
Party	Candidate	Votes	%
Democratic	Wilber G. Smith (incumbent)	14,049	69.0%
Republican	Hendrik Eleveld	6,328	31.0%
Total votes		20,377	100.0%
Democratic hold			

=== District 3 ===
Connecticut's 3rd State Senate district election, 1982
Party	Candidate	Votes	%
Democratic	John B. Larson	18,402	62.5%
Republican	Kevin H. Norige	11,047	37.5%
Total votes		29,449	100.0%
Democratic hold			

=== District 4 ===
Connecticut's 4th State Senate district election, 1982
Party	Candidate	Votes	%
Republican	Carl A. Zinsser (incumbent)	17,429	50.6%
Democratic	Stephen T. Penny	17,024	49.4%
Total votes		34,453	100.0%
Republican hold			

=== District 5 ===
Connecticut's 5th State Senate district election, 1982
Party	Candidate	Votes	%
Republican	Anne Streeter	24,274	56.9%
Democratic	Gerald A. Roisman	18,092	42.4%
Libertarian	Dana L. Downing	313	0.7%
Total votes		42,679	100.0%
Republican gain from Democratic			

=== District 6 ===
Connecticut's 6th State Senate district election, 1982
Party	Candidate	Votes	%
Democratic	Joseph H. Harper Jr.	17,859	66.1%
Republican	William M. Buzanoski	8,823	32.6%
Solidarity Party	Joseph K. Pac	358	1.3%
Total votes		27,040	100.0%
Democratic gain from Republican			

=== District 7 ===
Connecticut's 7th State Senate district election, 1982
Party	Candidate	Votes	%
Democratic	Cornelius O'Leary (incumbent)	20,290	66.7%
Republican	John C. Hinchliffe Jr.	10,150	33.3%
Total votes		30,440	100.0%
Democratic hold			

=== District 8 ===
Connecticut's 8th State Senate district election, 1982
Party	Candidate	Votes	%
Republican	Reginald J. Smith	19,808	55.5%
Democratic	John D. McKeon	15,893	44.5%
Total votes		35,701	100.0%
Republican hold			

=== District 9 ===
Connecticut's 9th State Senate district election, 1982
Party	Candidate	Votes	%
Democratic	Cynthia Matthews	19,902	54.3%
Republican	Charles E. Alfano	16,738	45.7%
Total votes		36,640	100.0%
Democratic hold			

=== District 10 ===
Connecticut's 10th State Senate district election, 1982
Party	Candidate	Votes	%
Democratic	John C. Daniels (incumbent)	16,823	74.4%
Republican	Thomas E. Mansfield	5,794	25.6%
Total votes		22,617	100.0%
Democratic hold			

=== District 11 ===
Connecticut's 11th State Senate district election, 1982
Party	Candidate	Votes	%
Democratic	Anthony V. Avallone	17,421	69.4%
Republican	Martin L. Rudnick	7,692	30.6%
Total votes		25,113	100.0%
Democratic hold			

=== District 12 ===
Connecticut's 12th State Senate district election, 1982
Party	Candidate	Votes	%
Democratic	Regina R. Smith (incumbent)	17,151	54.9%
Republican	Jay Cretella	14,080	45.1%
Total votes		31,231	100.0%
Democratic hold			

=== District 13 ===
Connecticut's 13th State Senate district election, 1982
Party	Candidate	Votes	%
Democratic	Amelia Mustone (incumbent)	18,672	67.3%
Republican	Louis Maleto	9,087	32.7%
Total votes		27,759	100.0%
Democratic hold			

=== District 14 ===
Connecticut's 14th State Senate district election, 1982
Party	Candidate	Votes	%
Republican	Tom Scott (incumbent)	16,355	52.9%
Democratic	Joan P. Abeshouse	14,541	47.1%
Total votes		30,896	100.0%
Republican hold			

=== District 15 ===
Connecticut's 15th State Senate district election, 1982
Party	Candidate	Votes	%
Democratic	Robert G. Dorr	15,231	50.5%
Republican	Thomas F. Upson	13,823	45.9%
Independent	Jo-El McGuinness	1,093	3.6%
Total votes		30,147	100.0%
Democratic gain from Republican			

=== District 16 ===
Connecticut's 16th State Senate district election, 1982
Party	Candidate	Votes	%
Democratic	William J. Sullivan (incumbent)	16,850	61.5%
Republican	Joseph J. Stango	10,549	38.5%
Total votes		27,399	100.0%
Democratic hold			

=== District 17 ===
Connecticut's 17th State Senate district election, 1982
Party	Candidate	Votes	%
Democratic	Eugene A. Skowronski (incumbent)	19,723	61.3%
Republican	George R. Temple	12,461	38.7%
Total votes		32,184	100.0%
Democratic hold			

=== District 18 ===
Connecticut's 18th State Senate district election, 1982
Party	Candidate	Votes	%
Democratic	Mary A. Martin (incumbent)	13,026	54.3%
Republican	Victor T. Boatwright	10,976	45.7%
Total votes		24,002	100.0%
Democratic hold			

=== District 19 ===
Connecticut's 19th State Senate district election, 1982
Party	Candidate	Votes	%
Democratic	James J. Murphy Jr. (incumbent)	17,150	64.5%
Republican	Peter J. Reenstra	9,461	35.5%
Total votes		26,611	100.0%
Democratic hold			

=== District 20 ===
Connecticut's 20th State Senate district election, 1982
Party	Candidate	Votes	%
Democratic	Richard F. Schneller (incumbent)	18,214	60.3%
Republican	Henry J. Wyatt	11,998	39.7%
Total votes		30,212	100.0%
Democratic hold			

=== District 21 ===
Connecticut's 21st State Senate district election, 1982
Party	Candidate	Votes	%
Republican	George Gunther (incumbent)	19,454	63.7%
Democratic	Virginia M. Chittem	11,097	36.3%
Total votes		30,551	100.0%
Republican hold			

=== District 22 ===
Connecticut's 22nd State Senate district election, 1982
Party	Candidate	Votes	%
Democratic	Howard T. Owens Jr. (incumbent)	17,739	56.6%
Republican	Dale W. Radcliffe	13,361	42.6%
Conservative	Fred Radford	263	0.8%
Total votes		31,363	100.0%
Democratic hold			

=== District 23 ===
Connecticut's 23rd State Senate district election, 1982
Party	Candidate	Votes	%
Democratic	Margaret E. Morton (incumbent)	10,351	70.1%
Republican	Joseph Haschak	4,424	29.9%
Total votes		14,775	100.0%
Democratic hold			

=== District 24 ===
Connecticut's 24th State Senate district election, 1982
Party	Candidate	Votes	%
Democratic	Wayne A. Baker (incumbent)	13,212	51.6%
Republican	Martin J. Smith Jr.	12,388	48.4%
Total votes		25,600	100.0%
Democratic hold			

=== District 25 ===
Connecticut's 25th State Senate district election, 1982
Party	Candidate	Votes	%
Republican	Andrew J. Santaniello Jr.	13,678	51.3%
Democratic	Andrew A. Glickson	12,965	48.7%
Total votes		26,643	100.0%
Republican hold			

=== District 26 ===
Connecticut's 26th State Senate district election, 1982
Party	Candidate	Votes	%
Republican	John G. Matthews (incumbent)	21,924	67.4%
Democratic	Eugene E. Cederbaum	10,602	32.6%
Total votes		32,526	100.00%
Republican hold			

=== District 27 ===
Connecticut's 27th State Senate district election, 1982
Party	Candidate	Votes	%
Democratic	Thom Serrani (incumbent)	16,652	64.5%
Republican	Mac Marshman	9,166	35.5%
Total votes		25,818	100.0%
Democratic hold			

=== District 28 ===
Connecticut's 28th State Senate district election, 1982
Party	Candidate	Votes	%
Republican	Fred Lovegrove	18,291	53.4%
Democratic	Patricia O'Hearne	15,980	46.6%
Total votes		34,271	100.0%
Republican hold			

=== District 29 ===
Connecticut's 29th State Senate district election, 1982
Party	Candidate	Votes	%
Democratic	Audrey P. Beck (incumbent)	18,291	68.6%
Republican	Glenn A. Shiffer Jr.	8,375	31.4%
Total votes		26,666	100.0%
Democratic hold			

=== District 30 ===
Connecticut's 30th State Senate district election, 1982
Party	Candidate	Votes	%
Republican	M. Adela Eads (incumbent)	18,422	55.0%
Democratic	Bill Willis	15,096	45.0%
Total votes		33,518	100.0%
Republican hold			

=== District 31 ===
Connecticut's 31st State Senate district election, 1982
Party	Candidate	Votes	%
Democratic	Steven C. Casey (incumbent)	21,814	74.7%
Republican	Joseph A. Shelto Jr.	7,400	25.3%
Total votes		29,214	100.0%
Democratic hold			

=== District 32 ===
Connecticut's 32nd State Senate district election, 1982
Party	Candidate	Votes	%
Republican	William F. Rogers III (incumbent)	18,059	60.2%
Democratic	Robert J. Allan	11,927	39.8%
Total votes		29,986	100.0%
Republican hold			

=== District 33 ===
Connecticut's 33rd State Senate district election, 1982
Party	Candidate	Votes	%
Republican	Kenneth T. Hampton	16,663	50.7%
Democratic	Frederick R. Knous (incumbent)	16,195	49.3%
Total votes		32,858	100.0%
Republican gain from Democratic			

=== District 34 ===
Connecticut's 34th State Senate district election, 1982
Party	Candidate	Votes	%
Republican	Philip S. Robertson (incumbent)	18,424	57.1%
Democratic	Carmen Romano	13,828	42.9%
Total votes		32,252	100.0%
Republican hold			

=== District 35 ===
Connecticut's 35th State Senate district election, 1982
Party	Candidate	Votes	%
Democratic	Michael J. Skelley (incumbent)	15,083	55.9%
Republican	Isham L. Martin Jr.	11,902	44.1%
Total votes		26,985	100.0%
Democratic hold			

=== District 36 ===
Connecticut's 36th State Senate district election, 1982
Party	Candidate	Votes	%
Republican	Michael L. Morano (incumbent)	19,661	64.8%
Democratic	Peter Gasparino	10,680	35.2%
Total votes		30,341	100.00%
Republican hold			
