= Connecticut's 36th State Senate district =

American legislative district

Senator
Ryan Fazio; R–Greenwich
- Demographics: 75.6% White; 4.1% Black; 10.8% Hispanic; 7.4% Asian; 0.5% Other; 1.6% Multiracial
- Population (2010): 98,830

Connecticut's 36th State Senate district elects one member of the Connecticut State Senate. The district consists of the towns of Greenwich, North Stamford, and portions of Stamford, New Canaan, and Newfield-Westover-Turn of River. It has been represented by Ryan Fazio since 2021.

== List of senators ==
In 1941, the Connecticut General Assembly passed HB no. 592, a bill that would divide the 27th Senate district (which at the time represented Stamford and Greenwich), splitting it so that Stamford alone would remain in the 27th district, and created a new 36th district which would represent Greenwich. The division was originally recommended by William J. Pape, an influential Waterbury publisher.

Senators	Party	Years	District home	Note
Edward L. Fenn	Republican	1943 – 1947	Greenwich	
George Griswold	Republican	1947 – 1953	Greenwich	
Ivor Kenway	Republican	1953 – 1955	Greenwich	
Florence Finney	Republican	1955 – 1977	Greenwich	
Michael L. Morano	Republican	1977 – 1989	Greenwich	
Emil Benvenuto	Republican	1989 – 1991	Greenwich	
William H. Nickerson	Republican	1991 – 2009	Greenwich	
Scott Frantz	Republican	2009 – 2019	Riverside	
Alexandra Kasser	Democratic	2019 – 2021	Greenwich	
Ryan Fazio	Republican	2021 – present	Riverside	

== Election results ==
=== 2024 ===
Connecticut's 36th State Senate district election, 2024
Party	Candidate	Votes	%
Republican	Ryan Fazio (incumbent)	29,293	51.73%
Total	Nicholas Simmons	27,334	48.27%
Democratic	Nicholas Simmons	26,583	46.94%
Independent Party	Nicholas Simmons	751	1.33%
Total votes		56,627	100.00%
Republican hold			

=== 2022 ===
Connecticut's 36th State Senate district election, 2022
Party	Candidate	Votes	%
Republican	Ryan Fazio (incumbent)	21,467	50.10%
Democratic	Trevor Crow	21,378	49.90%
Total votes		42,845	100.00
Republican hold			

=== 2021 (special) ===
Connecticut's 36th State Senate district special election, 2021
Party	Candidate	Votes	%
Republican	Ryan Fazio	8,911	50.1%
Democratic	Alexis Gevanter	8,453	47.6%
Independent	John Blankley	408	2.3%
Total votes		17,778	100%
Republican gain from Democratic			

=== 2020 ===
Connecticut's 36th State Senate district election, 2020
Party	Candidate	Votes	%
Democratic	Alex Kasser (Incumbent)	29,133	51.40%
Republican	Ryan Fazio	27,570	48.60%
Total votes		56,703	100.00%
Democratic hold			

=== 2018 ===
Connecticut's 36th State Senate district election, 2018
Party	Candidate	Votes	%
Democratic	Alexandra Kasser	22,261	50.4%
Total	Scott Frantz (incumbent)	21,645	49.0%
Republican	Scott Frantz	21,002	47.6%
Independent	Scott Frantz	643	1.5%
Green	Megan Cassano	238	0.5%
Total votes		44,144	100.0%
Democratic gain from Republican			

=== 2016 ===
Connecticut's 36th State Senate district election, 2016
Party	Candidate	Votes	%
Republican	Scott Frantz (incumbent)	28,901	58.98%
Democratic	John Blankey	19,291	39.37%
Green	Edward G. Heflin	811	1.65%
Total votes		49,003	100.00%
Republican hold			

=== 2014 ===
Connecticut's 36th State Senate district election, 2014
Party	Candidate	Votes	%
Republican	Scott Frantz (incumbent)	21,100	86.87%
Green	Edward G. Heflin	3,189	13.13%
Total votes		24,289	100.00%
Republican hold			

=== 2012 ===
Connecticut's 36th State Senate district election, 2012
Party	Candidate	Votes	%
Republican	Scott Frantz (incumbent)	27,623	60.96%
Democratic	Daniel Dauplaise	16,930	37.36%
Green	Remy C. Chevalier	762	1.68%
Total votes		45,315	100.00%
Republican hold			

=== 2010 ===
Connecticut's 36th State Senate district election, 2010
Party	Candidate	Votes	%
Republican	Scott Frantz (incumbent)	21,926	62.02%
Democratic	Nancy E. Barton	13,001	36.77%
Green	David A. Bedell	426	1.21%
Total votes		35,353	100.00%
Republican hold			

=== 2008 ===
Connecticut's 36th State Senate district election, 2008
Party	Candidate	Votes	%
Republican	Scott Frantz	26,308	58.21%
Democratic	Mark Diamond	17,912	39.63%
Green	Zachary A. Chavez	975	2.16%
Total votes		45,195	100.00%
Republican hold			

=== 2006 ===
Connecticut's 36th State Senate district election, 2006
Party	Candidate	Votes	%
Republican	William H. Nickerson (incumbent)	19,112	58.60%
Democratic	Frank A. Farricker	13,094	40.15%
Green	David A. Bedell	407	1.25%
Total votes		32,613	100.00%
Republican hold			

=== 2004 ===
Connecticut's 36th State Senate district election, 2004
Party	Candidate	Votes	%
Republican	William H. Nickerson (incumbent)	28,424	91.57%
Green	John A. Amarilios	2,615	8.43%
Total votes		31,039	100.00%
Republican hold			

=== 2002 ===
Connecticut's 36th State Senate district election, 2002
Party	Candidate	Votes	%
Republican	William H. Nickerson (incumbent)	20,445	100.00%
Total votes		20,445	100.00%
Republican hold			

=== 2000 ===
Connecticut's 36th State Senate district election, 2000
Party	Candidate	Votes	%
Republican	William H. Nickerson (incumbent)	27,603	100.00%
Total votes		27,603	100.00%
Republican hold			

=== 1998 ===
Connecticut's 36th State Senate district election, 1998
Party	Candidate	Votes	%
Republican	William H. Nickerson (incumbent)	19,801	100.00%
Total votes		19,801	100.00%
Republican hold			

=== 1996 ===
Connecticut's 36th State Senate district election, 1996
Party	Candidate	Votes	%
Republican	William H. Nickerson (incumbent)	28,692	100.00%
Total votes		28,692	100.00%
Republican hold			

=== 1994 ===
Connecticut's 36th State Senate district election, 1994
Party	Candidate	Votes	%
Republican	William H. Nickerson (incumbent)	20,573	73.41%
Democratic	Howard Richman	6,741	24.05%
A Connecticut Party	Carl G. Carlson Jr.	712	2.54%
Total votes		28,026	100.00%
Republican hold			

=== 1992 ===
Connecticut's 36th State Senate district election, 1992
Party	Candidate	Votes	%
Republican	William H. Nickerson (incumbent)	28,456	66.58%
Democratic	Peter Gasparino	14,285	33.42%
Total votes		42,741	100.00%
Republican hold			

=== 1990 ===
Connecticut's 36th State Senate district election, 1990
Party	Candidate	Votes	%
Republican	William H. Nickerson	12,588	42.88%
A Connecticut Party	Emil Benvenuto (incumbent)	9,488	32.32%
Democratic	Ned Lamont	7,278	24.80%
Total votes		29,354	100.00%
Republican gain from A Connecticut Party			

Results by district
District	Nickerson Republican		Benvenuto A Connecticut		Lamont Democratic		Total
District	Votes	%	Votes	%	Votes	%	Total
Greenwich	8,594	40.39%	7,631	35.86%	5,055	23.75%	21,280
1	637	37.96%	572	34.09%	469	27.95%	1,678
2	347	52.10%	168	25.23%	151	22.67%	666
2A	219	32.06%	316	46.27%	148	21.67%	683
3	155	27.38%	238	42.05%	173	30.57%	566
3A	68	23.53%	125	43.25%	96	33.22%	289
4	270	31.25%	309	35.76%	285	32.99%	864
4A	167	31.27%	226	42.32%	141	26.41%	534
5	778	39.43%	692	35.07%	503	25.50%	1,973
6	770	39.43%	640	32.77%	543	27.80%	1,953
7	824	53.13%	390	25.14%	337	21.73%	1,551
7A	118	39.20%	93	30.90%	90	29.90%	301
8	750	31.32%	1,120	46.76%	525	21.92%	2,395
9	653	35.74%	712	38.97%	462	25.29%	1,827
10	1,002	57.06%	391	22.27%	363	20.67%	1,756
11	878	61.31%	295	20.60%	259	18.09%	1,432
11A	414	57.98%	192	26.89%	108	15.13%	714
12	241	24.49%	569	57.83%	174	17.68%	984
12A	303	27.20%	583	52.33%	228	20.47%	1,114
Stamford	3,994	49.47%	1,857	23.00%	2,223	27.53%	8,074
Totals	12,588	42.88%	9,488	32.32%	7,278	24.80%	29,354

=== 1988 ===
Connecticut's 36th State Senate district election, 1988
Party	Candidate	Votes	%
Republican	Emil Benvenuto	25,621	66.16%
Democratic	Peter Gasparino	13,105	33.84%
Total votes		38,726	100.00%
Republican hold			

Results by district
District	Benvenuto Republican		Gasparino Democratic		Total
District	Votes	%	Votes	%	Votes
Greenwich	19,401	69.42%	8,546	30.58%	27,947
1	1,484	62.62%	886	37.38%	2,370
2	682	77.50%	198	22.50%	880
2A	610	70.20%	259	29.80%	869
3	382	48.29%	409	51.71%	791
3A	195	42.21%	267	57.79%	462
4	608	49.47%	621	50.53%	1,229
4A	345	50.66%	336	49.34%	681
5	1,825	77.63%	526	22.37%	2,351
6	1,763	74.48%	604	25.52%	2,367
7	1,504	75.39%	491	24.61%	1,995
7A	306	68.92%	138	31.08%	444
8	2,166	69.22%	963	30.78%	3,129
9	1,435	58.84%	1,004	41.16%	2,439
10	1,850	78.89%	495	21.11%	2,345
11	1,556	81.30%	358	18.70%	1,914
11A	758	77.82%	216	22.18%	974
12	893	73.44%	323	26.56%	1,216
12A	1,039	69.68%	452	30.32%	1,491
Stamford	6,220	57.70%	4,559	42.30%	10,779
Totals	25,621	66.16%	13,105	33.84%	38,726

=== 1986 ===
Connecticut's 36th State Senate district election, 1986
Party	Candidate	Votes	%
Republican	Michael L. Morano (incumbent)	16,052	63.85%
Democratic	Stephen Fuzesi Jr.	9,088	36.15%
Total votes		25,140	100.00%
Republican hold			

=== 1984 ===
Connecticut's 36th State Senate district election, 1984
Party	Candidate	Votes	%
Republican	Michael L. Morano (incumbent)	31,674	70.73%
Democratic	Betsy Gooch	13,109	29.27%
Total votes		44,783	100.00%
Republican hold			

=== 1982 ===
Connecticut's 36th State Senate district election, 1982
Party	Candidate	Votes	%
Republican	Michael L. Morano (incumbent)	19,661	64.80%
Democratic	Peter Gasparino	10,680	35.19%
Write-in		2	0.01%
Total votes		30,343	100.00%
Republican hold			

=== 1980 ===
Connecticut's 36th State Senate district election, 1980
Party	Candidate	Votes	%
Republican	Michael L. Morano (incumbent)	24,096	65.49%
Democratic	Suzanne E. Bailey	12,696	34.50%
Write-in		4	0.01%
Total votes		36,796	100.00%
Republican hold			

=== 1978 ===
Connecticut's 36th State Senate district election, 1978
Party	Candidate	Votes	%
Republican	Michael L. Morano (incumbent)	15,305	56.78%
Democratic	Peter Gasparino	11,648	43.21%
Write-in		5	0.01%
Total votes		26,958	100.00%
Republican hold			

=== 1976 ===
Connecticut's 36th State Senate district election, 1976
Party	Candidate	Votes	%
Republican	Michael L. Morano	22,385	59.09%
Democratic	Sheila G. Arnaboldi	15,502	40.91%
Total votes		37,887	100.00%
Republican hold			

=== 1974 ===
Connecticut's 36th State Senate district election, 1974
Party	Candidate	Votes	%
Republican	Florence Finney (incumbent)	14,626	53.49%
Democratic	Mary B. Sullivan	12,719	46.51%
Total votes		27,345	100.00%
Republican hold			

=== 1972 ===
Connecticut's 36th State Senate district election, 1972
Party	Candidate	Votes	%
Republican	Florence Finney (incumbent)	25,633	66.72%
Democratic	Alfred B. Lewis	12,781	33.27%
Write-in		3	0.01%
Total votes		38,417	100.00%
Republican hold			

=== 1970 ===
Connecticut's 36th State Senate district election, 1970
Party	Candidate	Votes	%
Republican	Florence Finney (incumbent)	19,038	64.95%
Democratic	Mary B. Sullivan	10,277	35.05%
Total votes		29,315	100.00%
Republican hold			

=== 1968 ===
Connecticut's 36th State Senate district election, 1968
Party	Candidate	Votes	%
Republican	Florence Finney (incumbent)	22,989	64.44%
Democratic	William F. Asher	12,680	35.55%
Write-in		8	0.01%
Total votes		35,677	100.00%
Republican hold			

=== 1966 ===
Connecticut's 36th State Senate district election, 1966
Party	Candidate	Votes	%
Republican	Florence Finney (incumbent)	16,173	60.00%
Democratic	Margaret H. Sager	10,777	39.99%
Write-in		3	0.01%
Total votes		26,953	100.00%
Republican hold			

=== 1962 ===
Connecticut's 36th State Senate district election, 1962
Party	Candidate	Votes	%
Republican	Florence Finney (incumbent)	14,820	65.89%
Democratic	Benjamin W. Bacon	7,669	34.10%
Write-in		1	0.01%
Total votes		22,490	100.00%
Republican hold			

=== 1960 ===
Connecticut's 36th State Senate district election, 1960
Party	Candidate	Votes	%
Republican	Florence Finney (incumbent)	17,987	65.15%
Democratic	Francis X. Lennon Jr.	9,619	34.85%
Total votes		27,606	100.00%
Republican hold			

=== 1958 ===
Connecticut's 36th State Senate district election, 1958
Party	Candidate	Votes	%
Republican	Florence Finney (incumbent)	13,468	65.78%
Democratic	Eugene H. Cleary	7,005	34.22%
Total votes		20,473	100.00%
Republican hold			

=== 1956 ===
Connecticut's 36th State Senate district election, 1956
Party	Candidate	Votes	%
Republican	Florence Finney (incumbent)	19,380	76.20%
Democratic	Margaret H. Sager	6,053	23.80%
Total votes		25,433	100.00%
Republican hold			

=== 1954 ===
Connecticut's 36th State Senate district election, 1954
Party	Candidate	Votes	%
Republican	Florence Finney	13,402	69.91%
Democratic	Lloyd W. Anthony	5,768	30.09%
Total votes		19,170	100.00%
Republican hold			

=== 1952 ===
Connecticut's 36th State Senate district election, 1952
Party	Candidate	Votes	%
Republican	Ivor Kenway	15,806	67.02%
Democratic	Robert C. Barnum Jr.	7,778	32.98%
Total votes		23,584	100.00%
Republican hold			

=== 1950 ===
Connecticut's 36th State Senate district election, 1950
Party	Candidate	Votes	%
Republican	George Griswold (incumbent)	12,630	69.69%
Democratic	Richard T. Davis	5,493	30.31%
Total votes		18,123	100.00%
Republican hold			

=== 1948 ===
Connecticut's 36th State Senate district election, 1948
Party	Candidate	Votes	%
Republican	George Griswold (incumbent)	12,038	65.86%
Democratic	William J. Cahill Jr.	6,240	34.14%
Total votes		18,278	100.00%
Republican hold			

=== 1946 ===
Connecticut's 36th State Senate district election, 1946
Party	Candidate	Votes	%
Republican	George Griswold	10,303	74.51%
Democratic	William D. Davies	3,524	25.49%
Total votes		13,827	100.00%
Republican hold			

=== 1944 ===
Connecticut's 36th State Senate district election, 1944
Party	Candidate	Votes	%
Republican	Edward L. Fenn (incumbent)	11,088	64.73%
Democratic	Lloyd W. Anthony	6,040	35.27%
Total votes		17,128	100.00%
Republican hold			

=== 1942 ===
Connecticut's 36th State Senate district election, 1942
Party	Candidate	Votes	%
Republican	Edward L. Fenn	7,314	65.85%
Democratic	William S. Meany Jr.	3,793	34.15%
Total votes		11,107	100.00%
Republican win (new seat)			
