= 2008 Connecticut Senate election =

2008 Connecticut State Senate election
- November 4, 2008

All 36 seats in the Connecticut State Senate 19 seats needed for a majority
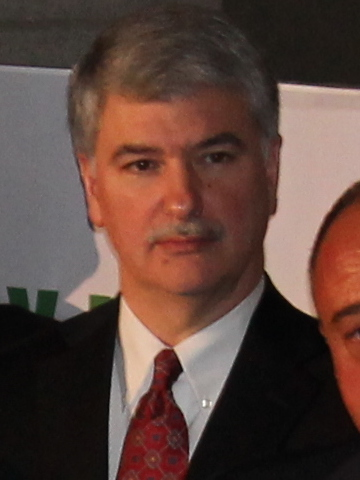

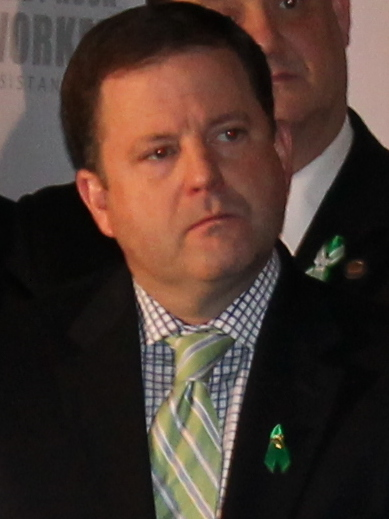
	Majority party	Minority party
Leader	Donald Williams	John McKinney
Party	Democratic	Republican
Leader since	July 1, 2004	June 2007
Leader's seat	29th	28th
Last election	24	12
Seats before	23	13
Seats after	24	12
Seat change	▲1	▼1
- Results: Democratic hold Democratic gain Republican hold
President pro tempore of the Senate before election
Donald Williams
Democratic
Elected President pro tempore of the Senate
Donald Williams
Democratic

The Connecticut Senate election, 2008 was held on November 4, 2008, to elect Senators to the Connecticut State Senate for the term which began in January 2009 and ended in January 2011. The election occurred on the same date as other federal and state elections, including the quadrennial U.S. presidential election.

The 2008 election saw the election or re-election of 24 Democrats and 12 Republicans to fill the Senate's 36 seats. The incumbent party in each district held onto control of their respective seats in the election, except for one seat which changed control from Republican to Democratic.

== Predictions ==
Source	Ranking	As of
Stateline	Safe D	October 15, 2008

== Results ==
Results of the 2008 Connecticut Senate election. Party shading denotes winner of Senate seat.

District	Constituency	Incumbent	Votes for Republican candidate	Votes for Democratic candidate
1	Hartford (part), Wethersfield (part)	John W. Fonfara (D)	Barbara J. Rhue; 4,027	John W. Fonfara; 18,898^{WF}^{TP}
2	Bloomfield (part), Hartford (part), Windsor (part)	Eric D. Coleman (D)	Veronica Airey-Wilson; 8,123	Eric D. Coleman; 27,321^{WF}
3	East Hartford, East Windsor, Ellington, South Windsor	Gary LeBeau (D)	No nomination	Gary D. LeBeau; 32,912^{WF}
4	Bolton, Glastonbury, Manchester, Marlborough	Mary Ann Handley (D)	David H. Blackwell; 20,282	Mary Ann Handley; 28,573^{WF}
5	Bloomfield (part), Burlington, Farmington (part), West Hartford	Jonathan A. Harris (D)	Joseph Merritt; 14,807	Jonathan A. Harris; 36,040^{WF}
6	Berlin, Farmington (part), New Britain	Donald J. DeFronzo (D)	Thomas A. Bozek; 9,941	Donald J. DeFronzo; 22,079^{WF}
7	East Granby, Enfield, Granby (part), Somers, Suffield, Windsor (part), Windsor Locks	John A. Kissel (R)	John A. Kissel; 24,206^{WF}	George Colli; 19,870
8	Avon, Barkhamsted, Canton, Colebrook, Granby (part), Hartland, Harwinton (part), New Hartford, Norfolk, Simsbury, Torrington (part)	Thomas J. Herlihy, Jr. (R)	Kevin D. Witkos; 26,853	Arthur H. House; 23,627^{WF}
9	Cromwell, Middletown (part), Newington, Rocky Hill, Wethersfield (part)	Paul R. Doyle (D)	Ralph Capenera; 20,089	Paul R. Doyle; 27,488
10	New Haven (part), West Haven (part)	Toni N. Harp (D)	Melissa Papantones; 2,836	Toni N. Harp; 25,586
11	Hamden (part), New Haven (part)	Martin M. Looney (D)	No nomination	Martin M. Looney; 29,426^{WF}
12	Branford, Durham, Gilford, Killingworth, Madison, North Branford	Edward Meyer (D)	Ryan Suerth; 20,430	Edward Meyer; 30,565
13	Cheshire (part), Meriden, Middlefield, Middletown (part)	Thomas P. Gaffey (D)	Tim Lenox; 10,543	Thomas P. Gaffey; 30,476^{WF}
14	Milford, Orange, West Haven (part)	Gayle Slossberg (D)	Vincent Marino; 16,776	Gayle Slossberg; 28,248
15	Naugatuck (part), Prospect, Waterbury (part)	Joan V. Hartley (D)	No nomination	Joan V. Hartley; 21,839^{TP}
16	Cheshire (part), Southington, Waterbury (part), Wolcott	Sam S.F. Caligiuri (R)	Sam S.F. Caligiuri; 25,362^{TP}	No nomination
17	Ansonia, Beacon Falls, Bethany, Derby, Hamden (part), Naugatuck (part), Woodbridge	Joe Crisco (D)	Tamath K. Rossi; 13,659	Joe Crisco; 25,553^{WF}
18	Griswold, Groton, North Stonington, Plainfield, Preston, Sterling, Stonington, Voluntown	Andrew M. Maynard (D)	Anne P. Hatfield; 13,189	Andrew M. Maynard; 27,389
19	Andover, Bozrah, Columbia, Franklin, Hebron, Lebanon, Ledyard, Lisbon, Montville (part), Norwich, Sprague	Edith G. Prague (D)	No nomination	Edith G. Prague; 32,458^{WF}^{RWI}
20	East Lyme, Montville (part), New London, Old Lyme, Old Saybrook (part), Salem, Waterford	Andrea Stillman (D)	Thomas C. Simones; 13,547	Andrea L. Stillman; 29,808^{TP}
21	Monroe (part), Shelton, Stratford (part)	Dan Debicella (R)	Dan Debicella; 24,925	Janice Andersen; 21,334^{WF}
22	Bridgeport (part), Monroe (part), Trumbull	Rob Russo (R)	Robert D. Russo; 17,994	Anthony J. Musto; 21,747^{WF}^{RWI}
23	Bridgeport (part), Stratford (part)	Ed A. Gomes (D)	Milton Johnson; 2,308	Edwin A. Gomes; 21,213^{WF}
24	Bethel (part), Danbury, New Fairfield, Sherman	David J. Cappiello (R)	Michael A. McLachlan; 19,262^{I}^{TP}	Duane E. Perkins; 17,536^{WF}
25	Darien (part), Norwalk	Bob Duff (D)	Steve Papadakos; 12,473	Bob Duff; 28,807^{WF}
26	Bethel (part), New Canaan (part), Redding, Ridgefield, Weston (part), Westport, Wilton	Judith Freedman (R)	Toni Boucher; 28,704	John Hartwell; 25,569^{WF}
27	Darien (part), Stamford (part)	Andrew J. McDonald (D)	Vacancy in nomination	Andrew J. McDonald; 25,946^{RWI}
28	Easton, Fairfield, Newtown, Weston (part)	John P. McKinney (R)	John McKinney; 31,627	Martin A. Goldberg; 19,802^{WF}
29	Brooklyn, Canterbury, Killingly, Mansfield, Putnam, Scotland, Thompson, Windham	Donald E. Williams, Jr. (D)	Harry Carboni; 9,163	Donald E. Williams; 27,733^{WF}
30	Brookfield, Canaan, Cornwall, Goshen, Kent, Litchfield, Morris, New Milford, North Canaan, Salisbury, Sharon, Torrington (part), Warren, Washington, Winchester	Andrew W. Roraback (R)	Andrew Roraback; 32,285	Michael J. Renzullo; 17,183^{WF}
31	Bristol, Harwinton (part), Plainville, Plymouth	Thomas A. Colapietro (D)	Vacancy in nomination	Tomas A. Colapietro; 29,229^{WF}
32	Bethlehem, Bridgewater, Middlebury, Oxford, Roxbury, Seymour (part), Southbury, Thomaston, Watertown, Woodbury	Rob Kane (R)	Robert J. Kane; 28,571	John McCarthy; 22,432^{WF}
33	Chester, Clinton, Colechester, Deep River, East Haddam, East Hampton, Essex, Haddam, Lyme, Old Saybrook (part), Portland, Westbrook	Eileen M. Daily (D)	Vincent A. Pacileo III; 17,624	Eileen M. Daily; 30,326^{TP}
34	East Haven, North Haven, Wallingford	Len Fasano (R)	Leonard A. Fasano; 31,122^{WF}	No nomination
35	Ashford, Chaplin, Coventry, Eastford, Ellington (part), Hampton, Pomfret, Stafford, Tolland, Union, Vernon, Willington, Woodstock	Tony Guglielmo (R)	Tony Guglielmo; 34,822	Vacancy in nomination
36	Greenwich, New Canaan (part), Stamford (part)	William H. Nickerson (R)	L. Scott Frantz; 26,308^{TP}	Mark Diamond; 17,912

Notes
^{TP} Denotes that a minor, third party candidate (or candidates) also ran in this district's election.

^{RWI} Denotes that a registered write-in candidate (or candidates) was also present in this district's election.

^{WF} Denotes that this candidate also ran on the line of the Connecticut Working Families Party. The votes won by this candidate include both their Working Families and their party of affiliation figures combined.

^{I} Denotes that this candidate also ran on the independent line. The votes won by this candidate include both their independent and their party of affiliation figures combined.
