= 2021 Connecticut elections =

Various special elections for the Connecticut House of Representatives and Connecticut State Senate were held in the U.S. state of Connecticut on various dates in 2021. Candidates for special elections in Connecticut are nominated through party conventions rather than party primaries.

== State elections ==
=== Legislative ===
==== State Senate 27th district special election ====
A special election was held on March 2, 2021, to fill Connecticut's 27th State Senate district after incumbent Democrat Carlo Leone resigned on January 5, 2021. The election was won by Democrat Patricia Billie Miller.

2021 Connecticut Senate 27th district special election
Party	Candidate	Votes	%
Democratic	Patricia Billie Miller	4,692	59.5%
Republican	Joshua Esses	3,109	39.4%
Independent	Brian Merlen	87	1.1%
Total votes		7,888	100%
Democratic hold			

==== House of Representatives 112th district special election ====
A special election was held on April 13, 2021, to fill Connecticut's 112th House of Representatives district after incumbent Republican J.P. Sredzinski resigned on February 17, 2021. The election was won by Republican Tony Scott.

2021 Connecticut House of Representatives 112th district special election
Party	Candidate	Votes	%
Republican	Tony Scott	2,248	53.2%
Democratic	Nicholas Kapoor	1,948	46.1%
Independent	William Furrier	31	0.7%
Total votes		4,227	100%
Republican hold			

==== House of Representatives 145th district special election ====
A special election was held on April 27, 2021, to fill Connecticut's 145th House of Representatives district after incumbent Democrat Patricia Miller resigned on March 8, 2021, after winning a special election to the Connecticut State Senate. The election was won by Democrat Corey Paris.

2021 Connecticut House of Representatives 145th district special election
Party	Candidate	Votes	%
Democratic	Corey Paris	730	76.4%
Republican	J.D. Ospina	225	23.6%
Total votes		955	100%
Democratic hold			

==== State Senate 36th district special election ====
A special election was held on August 17, 2021, to fill Connecticut's 36th State Senate district after incumbent Democrat Alexandra Kasser resigned on June 22, 2021. Democrats nominated Alexis Gevanter, while Republicans nominated Ryan Fazio. John Blankely, a Democrat, ran as an independent. Fazio ended up defeating Gevanter by 458 votes (2.9%), while Blankley earned 408 votes (50 votes less than Fazio's winning margin). This was the first legislative flip of the 2021 United States elections.

2021 Connecticut State Senate 36th district special election
Party	Candidate	Votes	%
Republican	Ryan Fazio	8,911	50.1%
Democratic	Alexis Gevanter	8,453	47.6%
Independent	John Blankley	408	2.3%
Total votes		17,778	100%
Republican gain from Democratic			

== See also ==
- 2021 United States state legislative elections
