= Jennifers' Law =

Law in Connecticut

Jennifers' Law is a law in the U.S. state of Connecticut that expands the definition of domestic violence to include "coercive control". The law is named for two women, both victims of domestic violence: Jennifer Farber Dulos and Jennifer Magnano.

== Jennifer Dulos ==
Jennifer Dulos has been missing since May 24, 2019. Dulos disappeared in the middle of divorce and child custody proceedings which included allegations of abusive behavior by her then-husband, Fotis Dulos. This custody battle had been ongoing for two years and a hearing had been scheduled to take place concerning the safety of the couple's five children. Fotis was later arrested for her murder but died by suicide, eight months after her disappearance, via carbon monoxide asphyxiation before a pretrial emergency bond hearing.

== Jennifer Magnano ==
Jennifer Magnano was fatally shot, in a murder-suicide by her estranged husband Scott, in front of their children on August 23, 2007. Scott had been ordered to stay away from the house where Jennifer and their three children lived. Similar to the Dulos case, this also occurred while the couple were in the midst of divorce and child custody disputes. Magnano's (now adult) children helped push for the passage of the law named after her.

== History ==
The bill was originally introduced in the COVID-19-shortened 2020 session of the Connecticut General Assembly and was re-introduced in March 2021 by state Sen. Alex Kasser (D-Greenwich). A number of organizations and domestic abuse survivors, including Evan Rachel Wood, testified in favor of the bill and recounted their own experiences with the abuse of power and control by their domestic partners had affected them. The bill was signed into law on June 28, 2021, by Connecticut Governor Ned Lamont. Senator Kasser would later reveal that she was also a victim of the type of abuse that the law targeted.

== Provisions ==
The law expanded the state's definition of domestic violence to include coercive control, which was defined as:

a pattern of behavior toward a person who is, or has been, an intimate partner or family or household member ... which causes fear or harm to such person or restricts such person's freedom of action.

Examples of behavior that the law identifies as coercive control include not merely physical violence or the threat of physical violence but also:

- Stalking and cyberstalking
- Isolating a person from family, friends, and other sources of support
- Denying a person resources that are needed for independence
- Manipulative control over a person's activities

According to Suzanne Adam, the executive director of the Domestic Violence Crisis Center of Stamford, Connecticut, the law also makes coercive control grounds for restraining orders and other protections in family relations matters brought to the Superior Courts and establishes grants for persons with low incomes applying for restraining orders. It also makes a number of other changes that are intended to assist people who utilize the courts for protection against abusers.
