= Senator Giddings =

Senator Giddings may refer to:

- Ammi Giddings (1822–1882), Connecticut State Senate
- J. Wight Giddings (1858–1933), Michigan State Senate
- James Giddings (fl. 1850s), Wisconsin State Senate
