= John Turvill Adams =

American novelist (1805–1882)

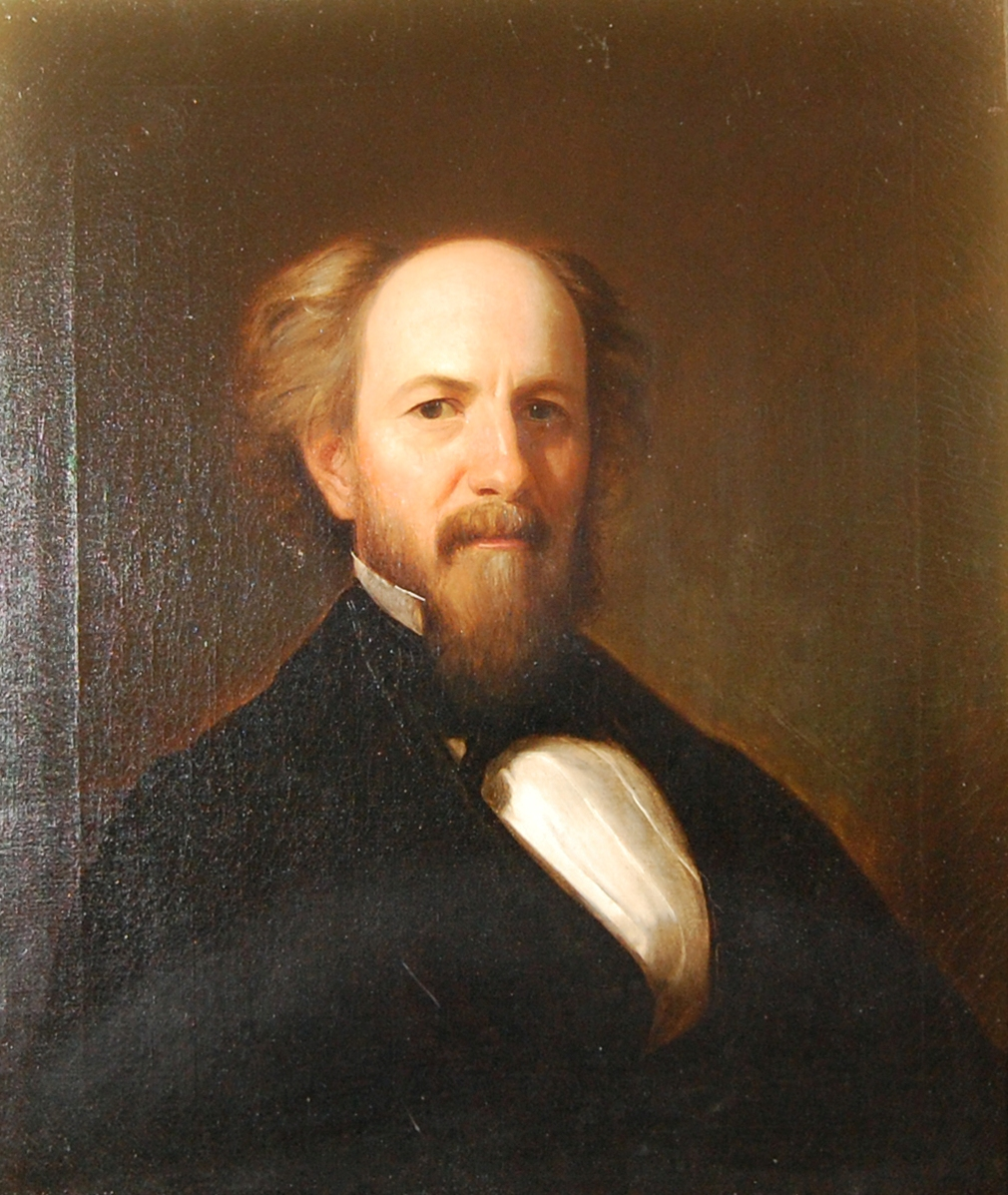

Personal details
- Born: September 29, 1805 Demerara, South America
- Died: March 30, 1882 (aged 76) Norwich, Connecticut
- Education: Yale University
- Occupation: Novelist; lawyer; politician

John Turvill Adams (September 29, 1805 – March 30, 1882) was an American novelist. He was a member of the Connecticut legislature and former lawyer. He died in Norwich, March 30, 1882.

== Early life ==
Adams was born September 29, 1805 of English parentage in Demerara, South America (now Guyana). In 1810, his father, Richard Adams, removed to Norwich, Connecticut, from which place the son entered Yale College, where he graduated in 1824. He began the study of law in the law school of the Hon. Samuel J. Hitchcock, of New Haven, in 1824, and while resident published a small volume of poems in 1825, but soon embarked in the dry-goods jobbing business in New York City, in partnership with Felix A. Huntington, of Norwich. It did not do well, and he abandoned it and returned to Connecticut.

== Books ==
In 1828, he started a newspaper called the Telegraph, in Stonington, Connecticut, which was merged the next year in the Norwich Republican, of which Adams continued the editor until 1834. About this time he was admitted to the bar, and in 1835 he was elected Judge of Probate, but held the office for only a short period, resigning it to remove from town, at first to Harrisburg, Pennsylvania, and, afterwards to Michigan. About 1844 he returned to Norwich, and in 1850 abandoned the practice of the law. He devoted himself later to literary pursuits, and published several tales of American life, such as The Lost Hunter (N.Y., 1856), and The Knight of the Golden Melice (N.Y., 1860).

== Senate ==
For the four years from 1860 to 1863 he represented Norwich in the Connecticut Legislature, and in 1864 he was a member, and acting President, of the Connecticut State Senate.

== Marriages ==
On Dec. 20, 1826, he married Hannah P. Huntington, daughter of Joseph Huntington, of Norwich, who died in Michigan, leaving a son and daughter, who both died before him. On Sept. 7, 1839, he next married Elizabeth Lee, daughter of Benjamin Lee, of Norwich, and widow of James S. Dwight, of Springfield, Mass. She died in Springfield, Jan. 9, 1865. Their marriage produced no children.
