= Florence Finney =

American politician (1903–1994)

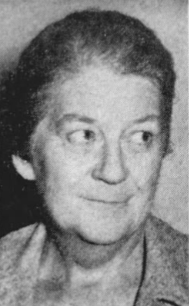

President pro tempore of the Connecticut State Senate
- In office July 10, 1973 – 1974
- Preceded by: Peter L. Cashman
- Succeeded by: Joseph J. Fauliso

Member of the Connecticut State Senate from the 36th district
- In office 1955–1976
- Preceded by: Ivor Kenway
- Succeeded by: Michael L. Morano

Member of the Connecticut House of Representatives from Greenwich
- In office 1949–1955 Serving with Milo A. Mitchell (1949–1951); Archibald H. Tunick (1951–1953); Harold O. Douglass (1953–1955)
- Preceded by: Milo A. Mitchell; Martha M. McKeehan
- Succeeded by: V. Hall Everson Jr. Harold O. Douglass

Personal details
- Born: Florence Donady; March 19, 1903 Long Island City, New York
- Died: May 28, 1994 (aged 91) Greenwich, Connecticut
- Party: Republican Party

Florence Donady Finney (March 19, 1903 – May 28, 1994) was an American politician and civic leader who served as the first woman president pro tempore of the Connecticut State Senate from 1973 through 1974. A Republican representing Greenwich, she served in the Connecticut House of Representatives (1949–1955) and the Senate (1955–1976).

== Early life and career ==
Finney was born in Long Island City, New York, on March 19, 1903, to William M. and Elizabeth (Conroy) Donady. She attended William Cullen Bryant High School and worked as a secretary for New York insurance firms after graduation.

On a visit to her sister who lived in Greenwich, Connecticut, she met James A. Finney, a local grocer. She married Finney and moved to Greenwich in 1923. They had their only child, James A. Finney Jr., in 1925. Finney worked as executive secretary to the vice president of Guggenheim Brothers from 1928 to 1935, resigning to help her husband launch an awnings business. Throughout her subsequent career in politics, she kept the business's accounts and repaired the sewing machines.

During World War II, Finney volunteered for the American Red Cross Motor Corps, sewed 3500 hours for the Red Cross, and volunteered Sundays at the Greenwich Civil Defense Control Center. She began volunteering for the local Republican Party in 1940. Prescott Bush appointed her to a special committee investigating the dismissal of a local public official. She won a seat on the 230-member Greenwich Representative Town Meeting in 1941, serving continuously for 42 years.

== Legislative career ==
Finney ran for the Connecticut House of Representatives in 1948 and won reelection twice. In 1955, she was elected to the Connecticut State Senate representing the 36th District based in Greenwich. She served continuously for 20 years, including deputy majority leader in 1973 and president pro tempore from July 10, 1973, through 1974. In this capacity, she presided over the Senate in the absence of the lieutenant governor and functioned as acting governor when both the governor and lieutenant governor were out of state. Finney was the first woman to serve as president pro tempore and only the fifth woman elected to the state senate. She never lost an election.

While serving in the General Assembly, Finney chaired the Public Welfare and Humane Institutions Committee and served on the Public Utilities, Penal Institutions, Public Personnel, and Federal and Intergovernmental Relations committees. In addition, she was a delegate to the 1965 Constitutional Convention. She commuted to Hartford and back home to Greenwich every day while the General Assembly was in session. Her legislative priorities included the welfare of families, the elderly, and children.Connecticut Post called her "dependable" and "well-liked," stating, "What she does is quietly accomplished without showmanship or desire for personal acclaim."

== Death ==
Finney died on May 28, 1994, at the Greenwich Woods Health Care Center. She was survived by her son and four grandchildren.
