= Ammi Giddings =

American politician

Ammi Giddings (c. 1822 – February 13, 1882) was an American lawyer and politician from Connecticut, who was twice elected to the Connecticut Senate. He served as President pro tempore of the Connecticut Senate. He was appointed to the Montana Territorial Supreme Court, but never served.

Giddings was born in about 1822 in Sherman, Connecticut. He graduated from Yale Law School, and was admitted to the bar in 1849. That same year, he married Augusta Bays of Wethersfield. He subsequently practiced law at Plymouth.

In 1857, Giddings was elected to the Connecticut Senate from the state's 16th District, and served as the President Pro Tempore. He was elected again in 1864. On June 15, 1864, President Abraham Lincoln appointed him as an associate justice of the Supreme Court for the newly formed Montana Territory; the United States Senate unanimously confirmed him on June 22. Giddings resigned immediately due to poor health and never served on the court. However, his commission remained in force until he was replaced in 1865, and histories of the Montana Supreme Court still list him as one of the first justices of that court.

In 1866, Giddings moved to Kalamazoo, Michigan. He returned to Connecticut in 1872 and died at Sherman in 1882.
