= Stephen Somma =

American politician

Member of the Connecticut State Senate from the 16th district
- In office January 4, 1989 – January 8, 2003
- Preceded by: Donald M. Rinaldi
- Succeeded by: Chris Murphy

Personal details
- Born: May 4, 1961 (age 65)
- Party: Republican

Stephen Somma (born May 4, 1961) is an American politician who served in the Connecticut State Senate from the 16th district from 1989 to 2003.
