= Ryan Fazio =

American businessman, politician (born 1990)

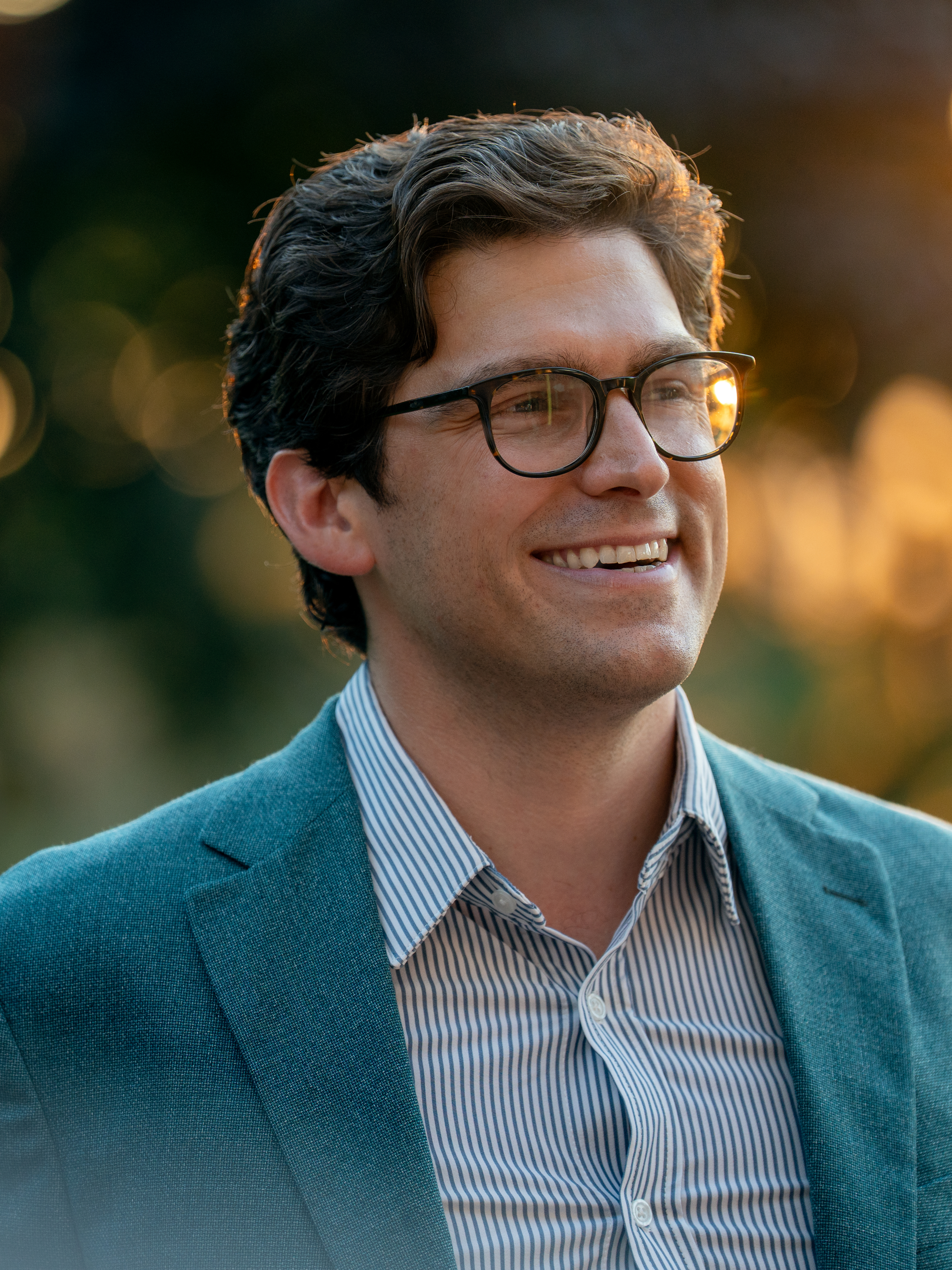
- Fazio in 2026

Member of the Connecticut State Senate from the 36th district
- Incumbent
- Assumed office August 26, 2021
- Preceded by: Alexandra Kasser

Personal details
- Born: Ryan Michael Fazio; March 27, 1990 (age 36) Norwalk, Connecticut, U.S.
- Party: Republican
- Spouse: Amy Orser (m. 2026)
- Education: Northwestern University (BS)
- Website: State Senate website; Campaign website

Ryan Michael Fazio (born March 27, 1990) is an American businessman and politician who is a member of the Connecticut State Senate for the 36th district. A member of the Republican Party, he won election in 2021 following the resignation of Democratic incumbent Alexandra Kasser, and was re-elected in 2022 and 2024.

He was the Republican nominee for governor of Connecticut in the 2026 election, losing to incumbent Governor Ned Lamont.

== Early life and education ==
Fazio was born March 27, 1990 in Norwalk, Connecticut, the first of the three children of Michael Fazio, a former partner of Arthur Andersen and managing director of Houlihan Lokey, and Madeline Fazio (née Gadaleta).

Fazio has two brothers, Michael and Christian, and a half-sister, Anastasia Fazio. He grew up in Greenwich, Connecticut, attending the local public schools before earning his baccalaureate in economics from Northwestern University in 2012.

== Professional career ==
Fazio spent most of his career in the commodities industry, with a focus on renewable fuels and agriculture. He is currently a financial advisor.

== Political career ==
=== State Senate ===
Before being elected to the state Senate, Fazio was elected to the Greenwich representative town meeting. On August 17, 2021, Fazio defeated Democratic lawyer Alexis Gevanter of Greenwich in a special election to fill the 36th district seat, which Alexandra Kasser vacated two months prior. His election ended the Democratic supermajority in the State Senate. He was re-elected in 2022 against Democrat Trevor Crow and in 2024 against Democrat Nick Simmons, former deputy chief of staff to Governor Ned Lamont. Fazio’s State Senate races have been noted as some of the most spent State Senate races in the history of Connecticut. He was the Republican nominee for the same seat in the 2020 Connecticut State Senate election. Connecticut's 36th district covers Greenwich and parts of Stamford and New Canaan.

=== 2026 Connecticut gubernatorial election ===
In 2026, Fazio became the Republican nominee for governor of Connecticut in 2026. He announced his candidacy in 2025. At the beginning of the campaign, former New Britain Mayor Erin Stewart was seen as the front runner in a tight race with Fazio. Stewart later suspended her campaign and endorsed Fazio a day before the convention. At the Connecticut Republican State Convention on May 16, 2026, at the Mohegan Sun Casino in Uncasville, he won the party’s endorsement on the first ballot with about 92% of the delegate vote. His remaining opponent, Betsy McCaughey, conceded shortly after at the convention. Fazio crossed the $250,000 threshold necessary to qualify for Connecticut's public financing system at the fastest rate in state history.

Fazio ran with lieutenant governor candidate Matthew Corey, a small businessman and Navy veteran. He faced Democratic incumbent governor Ned Lamont in the general election on November 3, 2026.

On November 3, 2026, Fazio lost the election for governor, gaining 41.19% of voters, losing to Ned Lamont's 58.81% of votes.

== Political positions ==
=== Energy ===
As ranking senator (the second highest ranked senator on the committee, behind co-Chair Norm Needleman) of the state’s Energy & Technology Committee, Fazio has been a voice on energy issues and critic of current state policies. In 2023, he co-authored parts of that year's SB7, including a section requiring utilities to itemize the cost of dozens of energy and environmental programs run by the state government on residents’ monthly bills. That category, called "Public Benefits", has become a source of debate. It includes subsidies for solar power, electric vehicle chargers, low-income households, and many other programs.

Fazio has repeatedly proposed legislation to eliminate "Public Benefits" charges from residents' energy bills, either eliminating programs or funding them in the state budget process. Fazio's proposals have drawn disagreement from progressive environmental groups and support among Republican legislators. In 2025, Fazio subsequently co-authored that year's SB4, which cut over $100 million per year from "Public Benefits" charges, although it was a compromise and didn't eliminate roughly $1 billion in costs as Fazio originally proposed. Gov. Ned Lamont gave Fazio some "credit" for advancing the law.

Fazio has also been a supporter of expanding natural gas pipeline capacity from the Marcellus shale region and better regulatory treatment for nuclear power.

=== Taxes and spending ===
Fazio is a fiscal conservative who has supported tax cuts and opposed large spending increases over his tenure. He earned a career 100% rating from the Connecticut Business and Industry Association for his voting record in support of "economic growth".

Fazio introduced a tax plan, SB602, calling for a 1.5 percentage-point income tax cut for middle-income households. It would fund the tax cut by reducing tax expenditures and state bonding. He also introduced a proposal for a property tax cap, SB556, that would cap increases in property taxes to 2 percent or inflation every year, like the law in Massachusetts.

Fazio was a vocal proponent of the state's so-called "fiscal guardrails", which were passed in 2017 and included a spending cap, "volatility cap", bonding cap, and revenue cap with the goal of mitigating the state’s tax increases and debt overhang.

=== Abortion ===
Fazio has stated he is in favor of keeping abortion legal in Connecticut. In 2022, Fazio voted against House Bill 5414, which allows aspiration abortions to be performed by midwives or nurses without a doctor. He stated that it would lower the standard of care for women.

In 2023, Fazio, along with the majority the Republican Senate conference, voted in favor of House Bill 6820, which increases public access to birth control in Connecticut, and also protects licensed medical providers from having their licenses revoked for providing an abortion.

=== Contraceptives ===
In 2023, Fazio co-authored a bill to expand contraception access in Connecticut by allowing certain trained pharmacists to prescribe oral contraception. The proposal was included in HB6768 and passed into law.

=== Economic issues ===
Fazio wrote and moved legislation to cut occupational licensing fees for workers. Legislation that Fazio introduced with several other legislators would cut all fees for workers like tradesmen, nurses, accountants, and others, to a maximum of $100. The legislation passed the Senate in 2024, SB135, but did not pass into law.

Fazio passed a law in 2025, SB1558, aimed at bringing back hundreds of millions in income tax revenue collected by New York and other neighboring states from Connecticut residents while they work from home for companies based in the other states. The law offers a 60 percent credit to any resident successfully appealing or litigating against another state in this area. It also requires the Attorney General to write a legal strategy to challenge other states taking such tax revenue from Connecticut.

=== Legislation ===
Fazio has been able to author or co-author several new laws as a state senator despite Republicans’ minority-party status in the legislature:

- SB6768, Section 6, in 2023 to allow trained pharmacists to prescribe hormonal contraception.
- SB7 in 2023 to reform oversight of utilities and require disclosure of "public benefits" charges on utility bills.
- SB333 in 2024 to increase the ability of towns and cities to make changes to their municipal charters.
- A 2024 law to eliminate college degree requirements for most state jobs.
- SB1558 in 2025 to prove financial support and state direction to sue New York and Massachusetts for taxing the income of Connecticut residents while they work from home for New York and Massachusetts companies.
- SB4 in 2025 to cut "public benefits" costs, including cutting subsidies for EV charging stations, solar subsidies, and more.

== Personal life ==
Fazio announced his engagement to Amy Elizabeth Orser (born 1997), a daughter of Henson Orser and Susan Orser (née Brink), of New Canaan, Connecticut, on August 10, 2025. They were married November 14, 2026 at St. Mary Church in Greenwich, Connecticut, in a Catholic ceremony.

Fazio is a resident of the Riverside section of Greenwich, Connecticut.

Party political offices
Preceded by Bob Stefanowski	Republican nominee for Governor of Connecticut; 2026	Most recent
