= Emil Benvenuto =

American businessman and politician (1931–2011)

Member of the Connecticut State Senate from the 36th district
- In office January 4, 1989 – January 9, 1991
- Preceded by: Michael L. Morano
- Succeeded by: William H. Nickerson

Member of the Connecticut House of Representatives from the 151st district
- In office January 5, 1977 – January 4, 1989
- Preceded by: Michael L. Morano
- Succeeded by: Lydia Stevens

Personal details
- Born: Emil V. Benvenuto; June 26, 1931 Greenwich, Connecticut, U.S.
- Died: October 4, 2011 (aged 80) Stamford, Connecticut, U.S.
- Party: Republican
- Spouse(s): Elizabeth Martinelli (m. 1949; died 2009) Marian Robertson (m. 2011)
- Children: 3
- Education: Greenwich High School

Military service
- Branch/service: United States Army
- Years of service: 1952–1954

Emil V. Benvenuto commonly known as Bennie Benvenuto (June 26, 1931 – October 4, 2011) was an American businessman and politician from Greenwich, Connecticut. He was a member of the Connecticut House of Representatives from 1976 to 1986 for the 151st District, which encompasses Greenwich. Benvenuto served one term between 1989 and 1991 as a member of the Connecticut State Senate for the Republican Party for the 36th district.

== Early life and education ==
Benvenuto was born June 26, 1931, in Greenwich, Connecticut, to Rocco and Angelina (née Bruno) Benvenuto. His father, Rocco L. Benvenuto (1899–1990), was born in Cosenza in Calabria, Italy, and worked as a construction laborer; his mother was born in Greenwich, Connecticut, to Italian parents. Emil Benvenuto had two elder brothers and one sister.

Benvenuto and his siblings had a very modest upbringing, often struggling to get enough food for the family. He was graduated from Greenwich High School before enlisting in the United States Army, which stationed him at Fort Lee, Virginia, from 1952 to 1954.

== Career ==
Benvenuto initially worked as a retail clerk in a sports goods store in Greenwich, to support his family. He would turn into a serial entrepreneur and initially operated a successful floor-refinishing business followed by the opening of a liquor store in Greenwich called Bennie Sez Liquor Mart in the Riverside section of Greenwich, which he ultimately sold in 1988 after 33 years ownership. In 1965, he established Benvenuto Real Estate Investment Co. and was primarily active in real estate brokerage and development activities in his hometown. Benvenuto came from humble origins and became a self-made millionaire and well respected civic leader.

He was a member of the Knights of Columbus, American Legion, American Legislative Exchange Council, National Conference of Insurance Legislators, Greenwich Council of Youth and Drugs as well as a board member of the Greenwich Boys & Girls Club.

== Politics ==
Benvenuto was elected in the Connecticut House of Representatives in 1976, serving six terms for the 151st District, which encompasses Greenwich. He won his first election on November 2, 1976, against competitors Lawrence W. Maloney, a Democrat and Elizabeth C. Spalding. Benvenuto captured a seat in the Connecticut Senate in 1988, where he served one term, before a split with the GOP saw him lose to William H. Nickerson in 1990, in a three-way race, with Nickerson running as a Republican and Ned Lamont as a Democrat. He was an ally and supporter of governor Lowell Weicker.

In more recent years, Benvenuto served on the Representative Town Meeting (RTM) of Greenwich representing the 12th district. He was also active on the Republican Town Committee.

== Personal life ==
In 1949, he married Elizabeth Martinelli (1931–2009), and they had three children. He married his second wife, Marian Robertson, only five days before his death.

Benvenuto owned and bred harness-racing horses that competed at Yonkers and Saratoga Raceways.

== Death ==
Benvenuto died on October 4, 2011, at Stamford Hospital in Stamford, Connecticut after a long battle with cancer.
