= Scott Frantz (politician) =

American politician

Member of the Connecticut State Senate from the 36th district
- In office January 7, 2009 – January 9, 2019
- Preceded by: William H. Nickerson
- Succeeded by: Alexandra Kasser

Personal details
- Born: Leroy Scott Frantz; June 29, 1960 (age 66) Hartford, Connecticut, U.S.
- Party: Republican
- Spouse: Allison Church Hanley (m. 1994)
- Children: 4
- Education: Princeton University (AB); Dartmouth College (MBA)
- Occupation: Businessman, politician

Leroy Scott Frantz colloquially L. Scott Frantz (/frænts/; FRANTS; born June 29, 1960) is an American businessman and politician who most notably served as a member of the Connecticut State Senate representing the 36th District, encompassing Greenwich and parts of New Canaan and Stamford, between 2009 and 2019.

Frantz graduated from Princeton University and the Tuck School of Business at Dartmouth College. After a career in M&A at Bankers Trust and after forming a private equity firm, he joined the Connecticut Economic Development Authority in 1993 serving as its chairman for six years. He then chaired the board of directors of Bradley International Airport before ultimately running for state office in 2008.

In September 2023, Frantz hosted a private fundraiser in Greenwich, Connecticut in the Ron DeSantis 2024 presidential campaign welcoming Ron DeSantis at his personal residence in the Riverside section of town.

== Early life and education ==
Leroy Scott Frantz was born to Leroy Frantz, Jr. (1927-2002) and his first wife Ann (née Haebler; d. 1988) in Hartford and raised in Greenwich, Connecticut. He is of Swiss and German descent. His paternal ancestor, Michael Frantz II, arrived in Lancaster County, Province of Pennsylvania somewhere prior to 1747, originally being from Hilterfingen, Switzerland. The modern spelling of the family name is Franz.

His maternal grandfather, Dr. William T. Haebler, was the founder and majority owner of International Flavors & Fragrances, Inc. (IFF). His father Leroy was a former executive at the company, through which connection he met his wife. The name of Frantz' investment company is derived from his maternal grandfather. Leroy Frantz, Jr. later owned the Dutch airline Transavia, and Marina America, a large shipyard and boat repair facility, located in Stamford. He had two brothers, his twin brother died in a helicopter accident.

Frantz attended The Hotchkiss School in Salisbury, Connecticut and graduated with an A.B. in politics from Princeton University in 1982, after completing a 244-page long senior thesis, titled "New Right Lobbying and the Death of Salt II". He later received an MBA from Tuck School of Business at Dartmouth College.

== Career ==
Frantz, a Republican, was first elected to the Connecticut Senate in 2008, representing the 36th Senate District, which includes all of Greenwich and parts of Stamford and New Canaan. He lost to Greenwich Democrat Alexandra Bergstein in the 2018 election, ending a nearly 90-year Republican hold on the seat. Frantz also served as chairman of the Connecticut Development Authority and the Bradley International Airport Board of Directors. He also has served on number of other public and nonprofit boards, including the Connecticut Brownfield Redevelopment Authority, the Greenwich Teen Center and Corporate Angel Network. He is also known as a prominent fundraiser for Republican candidates, including serving as the host for a 2006 Republican event featuring President George W. Bush.

Frantz is the president and chairman of Haebler Capital, a private investment capital firm based in Greenwich, which was founded in 1965 as a family investment vehicle.

== Personal life ==
On December 18, 1993 he married Allison Icy Hanley, a columnist of Greenwich. Her father was William L. Hanley, Jr., an heir to the Hanley Company (Petroleum, Brick), as well as a civic leader in Greenwich and prominent Republican Party ally of Ronald Reagan. They have four children;

- Christopher "Hunter" Frantz (born 1996)
- Scott McKinley Frantz (born 1997), twin of Hanley, named for Mount McKinley (currently Denali), a New York City-based architect and alum of Princeton University.
- Pierce Hanley Frantz (born 1997), twin of McKinley, named for Mount Pierce, a New York City-based finance professional and alum of Princeton University.
- Brady Frantz (born 2005)

He resides in the Riverside section of Greenwich. Frantz is the owner of the 1936 classic ketch Ticonderoga.
