= Lee Scarpetti =

American politician and businesswoman (1927–2013)

Angelina "Lee" Scarpetti

Member of the Connecticut Senate from the 22nd district
- In office January 9, 1985 – January 7, 1987
- Preceded by: Howard T. Owens Jr.
- Succeeded by: Howard T. Owens Jr.
- In office January 4, 1989 – January 3, 2001
- Preceded by: Howard T. Owens Jr.
- Succeeded by: Bill Finch

Personal details
- Born: Angelina Capozziello; November 3, 1927 Faeto, Foggia, Italy
- Died: March 22, 2013 (aged 85) Bridgeport, Connecticut, U.S.
- Resting place: Saint Michael's Cemetery, Stratford, Connecticut, U.S.
- Party: Republican
- Spouse: Raymond D. Scarpetti Sr. (m. 1951; died 1991)

Angelina "Lee" (Capozzellio) Scarpetti (November 3, 1927 – March 22, 2013) was an American politician and businesswoman.

Born in Faeto, Foggia, Italy, Scarpetti moved to Bridgeport, Connecticut with her family. After her marriage, Scarpetti and her husband Raymond Scarpetti started a restaurant. She was also a real estate realtor. Scarpetti also served in the Connecticut State Senate as a Republican 1984–1986, 1988–2000. She died at 85 years old in Bridgeport, Connecticut.
