= Alexandra Kasser =

American politician (born 1967)

Alex Kasser

Member of the Connecticut State Senate from the 36th district
- In office January 9, 2019 – June 22, 2021
- Preceded by: Scott Frantz
- Succeeded by: Ryan Fazio

Personal details
- Born: Alexandra Veronica Mochary; May 4, 1967 (age 59) Chicago, Illinois, U.S.
- Party: Democratic
- Spouse: Seth Bergstein (m. 1995; div. 2022) Nichola Samponaro (m. 2022)
- Education: Phillips Academy, Andover (High School); Wesleyan University (BA); University of Chicago (JD); Yale University (MA)
- Occupation: Politician, attorney, advocate

Alex Mochary Kasser (born May 4, 1967) is an American politician, attorney and advocate who served as a member of the Connecticut State Senate for the 36th district from 2019 to 2021. Connecticut's 36th district covers Greenwich and parts of Stamford and New Canaan. Kasser is a member of the Democratic Party and was the first Democrat to be elected to the seat since 1933.

== Early life and education ==
Kasser was born Alexandra Veronica Mochary on May 4, 1967, in Chicago, Illinois, the first of two children of Mary Mochary (née Kasser; b. 1942), an attorney and former mayor of Montclair, New Jersey and Republican nominee for United States Senate in 1984, and Stephen E. Mochary (1940–2001), an attorney and federal judge. Her younger brother is Matt Mochary. Her maternal grandparents immigrated to the United States at the end of World War II originally being from Hungary.

Kasser received her bachelor's degree from Wesleyan University in 1988. In 1993, she received a J.D. degree from University of Chicago Law School. She was admitted to a PhD program at Yale University in 2010 and earned a master's degree from Yale in 2014. After completing her qualifying examinations, she became a doctoral candidate that same year.

== Career ==
Kasser practiced corporate law at the firm of Skadden Arps Slate Meagher & Flom.

In the 2018 election, Kasser, a political newcomer, defeated five-term Republican incumbent, Scott Frantz, becoming the first Democrat to represent Greenwich in the State Senate since 1930, and the first Democrat to win the 36th Senate district since 1933. Kasser won by about 600 votes. In 2020, Kasser won re-election by about 1,100 votes, nearly doubling her margin of victory from the 2018 election, when she defeated Republican incumbent Scott Frantz by 616 votes.

In the Connecticut Senate, Kasser served as Vice Chair of the Judiciary Committee, Co-Chair of the Banking Committee, and Vice Chair of the Transportation Committee. She was also a member of the Public Health Committee, the Environment Committee, the Legislative Regulation Review Committee, and the Executive and Legislative Nominations Committee. She was also a Deputy Majority Leader of the Senate.

In the State Senate, Kasser led an effort to reintroduce tolls on Connecticut's state highways, intended to generate revenue from out-of-state drivers; the proposal ultimately did not pass. She also proposed the creation of an Infrastructure Bank in Connecticut, designed to finance infrastructure projects through public-private partnerships; the legislation passed in the Senate but was not brought to a vote in the House. Kasser introduced a bill providing tax credits to employers who make payments on employees' student loans. An amended version of the bill was passed in the State Senate in May 2019, and signed into law by governor Ned Lamont the following month.

Kasser was a proponent Paid Family Medical Leave program, that was adopted by the Connecticut legislature in 2019. She also backed efforts to raise the state minimum wage during her time in office. Additionally, Kasser introduced a bill to eliminate Connecticut's estate and gift tax, and advocated for changes to the state's tax structure.

In 2021, Kasser introduced and championed legislation known as Jennifers' Law, which legally redefines domestic violence to include coercive control. The law includes multiple protections for victims of domestic violence and their children, including the ability to access free legal help, change locks in rental units and apply for restraining orders if they've experienced coercive control. In a section that addresses custody matters, the law adds "physical and emotional safety of the child" as the first factor to be considered by judges and Guardian Ad Litems. They must also consider "the effect on the child of the actions of an abuser if any domestic violence, as defined in 46b1 (which now includes coercive control) has occurred between the parents." Jennifers' Law is named in honor of Jennifer Dulos, a New Canaan woman living in Kasser's district, who disappeared after a dispute with her husband, Fotis Dulos, and Jennifer Magnano, who was shot and killed by her husband in front of her children.

In 2021, Kasser introduced legislation known as the Connecticut Parentage Act. The law expanded legal recognition of parentage in Connecticut, extending legal protections to families including same-sex parents, unmarried parents and parents who conceive children through assisted reproduction.

== Divorce and resignation ==
On June 22, 2021, Kasser announced her resignation from the Connecticut State Senate at the end of her third legislative session, citing personal circumstances, including ongoing divorce litigation, as impeding her ability to perform her duties effectively. In her resignation note, she highlighted her legislative achievements and commitment to social issues, writing: 'I am particularly proud of introducing and passing legislation including the Parentage Act and Jennifers' Law so that no one is shamed for who they are or trapped in an abusive situation.'

Her seat was subsequently filled following a special election by Republican Ryan Fazio.

== Personal life ==
After filing for divorce, Kasser began dating her current partner, Nichola Samponaro, a political consultant and Realtor who grew up in Greenwich, CT. Samponaro volunteered as Kasser's 2018 and 2020 campaign manager.

In 2019, Kasser gave a TEDx talk describing her personal journey to finding "Love and Purpose."

== Non-profit involvement ==
From 2012 to 2016, Kasser was chairman of the Mount Sinai Children's Environmental Health Center board, an organization dedicated to advancing research on the environmental and epigenetic causes of children's diseases, including cancer. Kasser is the founder of The Parity Partnership, a non-profit dedicated to advancing gender equality in the public and private sectors. She was also chairman of Greenwich Community Gardens and has served on various boards dedicated to helping children, such as Kids in Crisis.
