= Wilber G. Smith =

American politician (1935–1992)

Member of the Connecticut Senate
- In office 1971–1977
- In office 1981–1985
- Succeeded by: Frank Barrows

Personal details
- Born: March 21, 1935 Orlando, Florida, U.S.
- Died: July 31, 1992 (aged 57) Newington, Connecticut, U.S.
- Party: Democratic; A Connecticut Party
- Education: Eastern Connecticut State University; University of Connecticut School of Law

Wilber G. Smith (March 21, 1935 – July 31, 1992) was an American civil rights activist politician who served in the Connecticut Senate as a member of the Democratic Party.

== Early life ==
Wilber G. Smith was born on March 21, 1935. During his childhood he attended segregated schools in Orlando, Florida, and later attended Weaver High School. He graduated from the Eastern Connecticut State University and the University of Connecticut School of Law.

== Career ==
In 1969, he ran unsuccessfully for mayor of Hartford as an independent. In 1970, he was elected to the Connecticut Senate and served until 1977, when he moved to New York to run the national NAACP prison program. A slander lawsuit was filed against him in 1979, after he accused assistant city manager Michael F. Brown of sympathizing with the Ku Klux Klan. He returned to the Senate in 1980, and served until he was defeated by Frank Barrows in 1984. In 1990, he ran against Barrows, but was defeated.

== Death ==
On July 31, 1992, Smith died from cancer in Newington, Connecticut.
