= Judith Freedman (politician) =

American politician

Member of the Connecticut State Senate from the 26th district
- In office January 7, 1987 – January 7, 2009
- Preceded by: John G. Matthews
- Succeeded by: Toni Boucher

Personal details
- Born: March 11, 1939 (age 87) Bridgeport, Connecticut, U.S.
- Party: Republican

Judith Freedman (born March 11, 1939) is an American politician who served in the Connecticut State Senate from the 26th district from 1987 to 2009.

== Personal life ==
She is Jewish.
