= Michael L. Morano =

American politician and businessman (1915–2000)

Member of the Connecticut House of Representatives from Greenwich
- In office 1961–1967
- Preceded by: Nelson I. Beers; William A. G. Minot
- Succeeded by: Seat eliminated

Member of the Connecticut House of Representatives from the 151st district
- In office January 4, 1967 – January 5, 1977
- Preceded by: Seat created
- Succeeded by: Emil Benvenuto

Member of the Connecticut Senate from the 36th district
- In office January 5, 1977 – January 4, 1989
- Preceded by: Florence Finney
- Succeeded by: Emil Benvenuto

Personal details
- Born: Michael Lawrence Morano; October 16, 1915 Greenwich, Connecticut, U.S.
- Died: May 7, 2000 (aged 84) Greenwich, Connecticut, U.S.
- Party: Republican
- Relations: Albert P. Morano (cousin)
- Children: 6
- Occupation: Businessman, politician

Michael Lawrence Morano (October 16, 1915 – May 7, 2000) was an American businessman and politician from Connecticut. A Republican, Morano served in the Connecticut House of Representatives from 1961 to 1977 and in the Connecticut State Senate from 1977 to 1989.

== Early life and education ==
Morano was born on October 16, 1915, in Greenwich, Connecticut, the second of eight children, to Lawrence Morano, a clothing retail merchant, and Marietta (née DeLuca). His parents were born in Connecticut and New York, and all his grandparents were born in Italy.

== Politics ==
=== Connecticut House of Representatives ===
A Republican, Morano was first elected to the Connecticut House of Representatives in 1960, and he served until 1967 as a representative from the town of Greenwich. Although he was formally elected to only two terms of two years each, Morano remained in his seat until 1967 due to Connecticut's 1964 redistricting. Following the court decision Butterworth V. Dempsey, Connecticut was federally mandated to eliminate its single-town electoral districts before its 1964 House election, and when the General Assembly failed to do so in time, the election was canceled, and the legislature elected in 1962 was ultimately held over until 1967 due to a lengthy impasse. During his first term, Morano served alongside Nelson I. Beers, and from 1963 to 1967, alongside Lowell Weicker.

In 1966, following the elimination of the Greenwich district, Morano ran for election to the newly established 151st district of the Connecticut House of Representatives. He was elected and served five terms. He did not run for reelection in 1976, instead running for the Connecticut State Senate, and was succeeded by fellow Republican Emil Benvenuto.

=== Connecticut State Senate ===
Morano was elected to the Connecticut State Senate in 1976, and he served six terms representing the 36th district. He did not run for reelection in 1988 and was succeeded by Emil Benvenuto.

== Career ==
In 1940, Morano borrowed $7,500 to start a car dealership in his hometown of Greenwich. He operated the company until his election into the Connecticut House of Representatives, when he put his eldest son, Robert J. Morano (1938–1985), in charge.

== Personal life ==
Morano married Ruth S. (b. 1916) in 1937. They had six children.

Morano died on May 7, 2000, at his home in Greenwich, Connecticut. He was 84.
