= Fred Lovegrove =

American politician (1939–2013)

Member of the Connecticut Senate from the 28th district
- In office 1983–1999
- Preceded by: Myron R. Ballen
- Succeeded by: John P. McKinney

Personal details
- Born: May 17, 1939
- Died: April 12, 2013 (aged 73)
- Party: Republican
- Education: Villanova University

Military service
- Branch/service: U.S. Army

Fred Hampton "Ted" Lovegrove, Jr. (May 17, 1939 – April 12, 2013) was an American politician who served in the Connecticut State Senate from 1983 to 1999, representing the 28th district as a Republican.

Born in New York City, Lovegrove served in the United States Army. Lovegrove graduated from Chestnut Hill Academy and went to Villanova University. He served in the Connecticut State Senate from Fairfield, Connecticut.

Lovegrove died of prostate cancer on April 12, 2013. He was 73.
