= Presidents pro tempore of the Connecticut Senate =

The Lieutenant Governor of Connecticut serves as the President of the Connecticut State Senate, but only casts a vote if required to break a tie. When the lieutenant governor is absent, the President Pro Tempore of the Connecticut Senate presides. The President pro tempore is elected by the majority party caucus followed by confirmation of the entire Senate through a Senate Resolution. The President pro tempore is the chief leadership position in the Senate. The Senate majority and minority leaders are elected by their respective party caucuses.

The current President pro tempore of the Connecticut Senate is Martin M. Looney, a Democrat who has served since 2015.

== List of presidents pro tempore of the Connecticut Senate ==
Name	Town and political party	Term of service
Aaron N. Skinner	New Haven, (W)	1845
Samuel Ingham	Saybrook, (D)	1846
Thomas C. Perkins	Hartford, (W)	1847
Thomas B. Butler	Norwalk, (W)	1848
Henry Dutton	New Haven, (W)	1849
Samuel Ingham	Saybrook, (D)	1850
Henry E. Peck	New Haven, (W)	1851
James T. Pratt	Rocky Hill, (D)	1852
Daniel B. Warner	East Haddam, (D)	1853
John Boyd	West Winsted, (Free Soil Dem)	1854
James F. Babcock	New Haven, (W)	1855
Leman W. Cutler	Watertown, (AR)	1856
Ammi Giddings	Plymouth, (U)	1857
Elisha Carpenter	Killingly, (R)	1858
Thaddeus Welles	Glastonbury, (R)	1859
Joseph G. Lamb	Norwich, (AR)	1860
Andrew B. Mygatt	New Milford, (R)	1861
Hiram Goodwin	Hitchcockville, (R) (U)	1862
Gilbert W. Phillips	Putnam, (R) (U)	1863
John T. Adams	Norwich, (U)	1864
Orlando J. Hodge	Robertsville, (U)	1865
John T. Wait	Norwich, (U)	1866
Amos J. Gallup	Sterling, (R)	1867
Edwin H. Bugbec	Killingly, (R)	1868
David Gallup	Plainfield, (R)	1869
Edward Harland	Norwich, (R)	1870
Ezra Hall	Marlborough, (R)	1871
S. Storrs Cotton	Pomfret, (R)	1872
Allen Tenny	Norwich, (R)	1873
Luzon B. Morris	New Haven, (D)	1874
Caleb B. Bowers	New Haven, (D)	1875
Ephraim H. Hyde	Stafford, (D)	1876
Oliver Hoyt	Stamford, (R)	1877,78
Gilbert W. Phillips	Putnam, (R)	1879
Lyman W. Coe	Torrington, (R)	1880,81
Robert Coit	New London, (R)	1882,83
Lorrin A. Cooke	Winsted, (R)	1884
Stiles T. Stanton	Stonington, (R)	1885,86
Robert J. Walsh	Greenwich, (R)	1887,88
John Manning Hall	Willimantic, (R)	1889,90
David M. Read	Bridgeport, (D)	1891,92
Frederick W. Holden	Ansonia, (D)	1893,94
John Ferris	South Norwalk, (R)	1895,96
William Marigold	Bridgeport, (R)	1897,98
Edwin O. Keeler	Norwalk, (R)	1899,1900
Henry Roberts	Hartford, (R)	1901,02
Rollin S. Woodruff	New Haven, (R)	1903,04
Samuel Fessenden	Stamford, (R)	1905,06
Stiles Judson	Stratford, (R)	1907,08
Isaac W. Brooks	Torrington, (R)	1909,10
Frank C. Woodruff	Orange, (R)	1911,12
George Landers	New Britain, (D)	1913,14
Frederic A. Bartlett	Bridgeport, (R)	1915,16
Henry H. Lyman	Middlefield, (R)	1917,18
William H. Heald	Stafford Springs, (R)	1919,20
William H. Hall	South Willington, (R)	1921,22
John H. Trumbull	Plainville, (R)	1923,24
Edwin Brainard	Branford, (R)	1925,26
Frederic C. Walcott	Norfolk, (R)	1927,28
Roy C. Wilcox	Meriden, (R)	1929,30
Albert E. Lavery	Fairfield, (R)	1931,32
David Goldstein	Bridgeport, (D)	1933,34
John F. Lynch	West Haven, (R)	1935,36
Joseph H. Lawlor	Waterbury, (D)	1937,38
Charles J. Arrigoni	Durham, (R)	1939,40
Joseph B. Downes	Norwich, (D)	1941,42
Frank H. Peet	Kent, (R)	1943,44
Samuel H. Malkan	New Haven, (D)	1945,46
Robert E. Parsons	Farmington, (R)	1947,48
Cornelius Mulvihill, Jr.	Bridgeport, (D)	1949,50
William Perry Barber	Putnam, (D)	1951,52
Oscar Peterson, Jr.	Stratford, (R)	1953,54
Patrick J. Ward	Hartford, (D)	1955,56
Theodore S. Ryan	Sharon, (R)	1957,58
Anthony Armentano	Hartford, (D)	1959–62
Fred J. Doocy^{1}	Wapping, (D)	1963–1/16/66
Paul J. Falsey^{2}	New Haven, (D)	1/26/66–1966
Charles T. Alfano	Suffield, (D)	1967–72
Peter L. Cashman^{3}	Lyme, (R)	1973–6/7/73
Florence Finney^{4}	Cos Cob, (R)	7/10/73–1974
Joseph J. Fauliso^{5}	Hartford, (D)	1975–80
James J. Murphy, Jr.	Franklin, (D)	1981–84
Philip S. Robertson	Cheshire, (R)	1985–86
John B. Larson	East Hartford, (D)	1987–94
M. Adela Eads	Kent, (R)	1995–97
Kevin B. Sullivan^{6}	West Hartford, (D)	1997–7/1/2004
Donald E. Williams, Jr. ^{7}	Brooklyn, (D)	7/1/2004–2014
Martin M. Looney	New Haven, (D)	2015–

- 1 Succeeded to the office of Lieutenant Governor. Took oath of office January 17, 1966.
- 2 Became President Pro Tempore when Fred Doocy became Lieutenant Governor.
- 3 Succeeded to the office of Lieutenant Governor. Took oath of office June 7, 1973.
- 4 Became President Pro Tempore when Peter L. Cashman became Lieutenant Governor.
- 5 Succeeded to the office of Lieutenant Governor. Took oath of office December 31, 1980.
- 6 Succeeded to the office of Lieutenant Governor. Took oath of office July 1, 2004.
- 7 Became President Pro Tempore when Kevin B. Sullivan became Lieutenant Governor.
