= Cynthia Matthews =

American politician (1924–2016)

Member of the Connecticut House of Representatives from the 9th district
- In office 1983–1985
- Preceded by: Bill Curry
- Succeeded by: Richard B. Johnston
- In office 1987–1993
- Preceded by: Richard B. Johnston
- Succeeded by: Richard J. Balducci

Personal details
- Born: February 1, 1924 Washington, Pennsylvania, U.S.
- Died: October 31, 2016 (aged 92) Waterford, Connecticut, U.S.
- Party: Democratic
- Spouse: Phathon James Matthews
- Children: 2
- Education: Barnard College

Agnes Cynthia Matthews (February 1, 1924 – October 31, 2016) was an American politician who served in the Connecticut State Senate from 1983 to 1985 and 1987 to 1993, representing the 9th district as a Democrat.

== Personal life ==
Matthews and her twin sister, Helen, were born on February 1, 1924, in Washington, Pennsylvania. Their parents, Spero and Harriett Kosmas, were ethnically Greek immigrants from Asia Minor. Matthews graduated from Barnard College in New York City, where she majored in international relations. She was married to Phathon James Matthews and had two children.

== Political career ==
Matthews began her political career in Wethersfield, Connecticut, where she served on the town council from 1973 to 1981. From 1975 to 1979, she served as mayor, the first woman to hold the position.

Matthews was first elected to the Connecticut State Senate in 1982 and served one term representing the 9th district as a Democrat. She ran for reelection in 1984, but was defeated by Richard B. Johnston. She successfully ran for reelection in 1986 and served three more terms. Richard J. Balducci succeeded her in 1993.

== Death ==
Matthews died on October 31, 2016, at her home in Waterford, Connecticut. She was 92.
