= Connecticut Republican Party =

Connecticut affiliate of the Republican Party

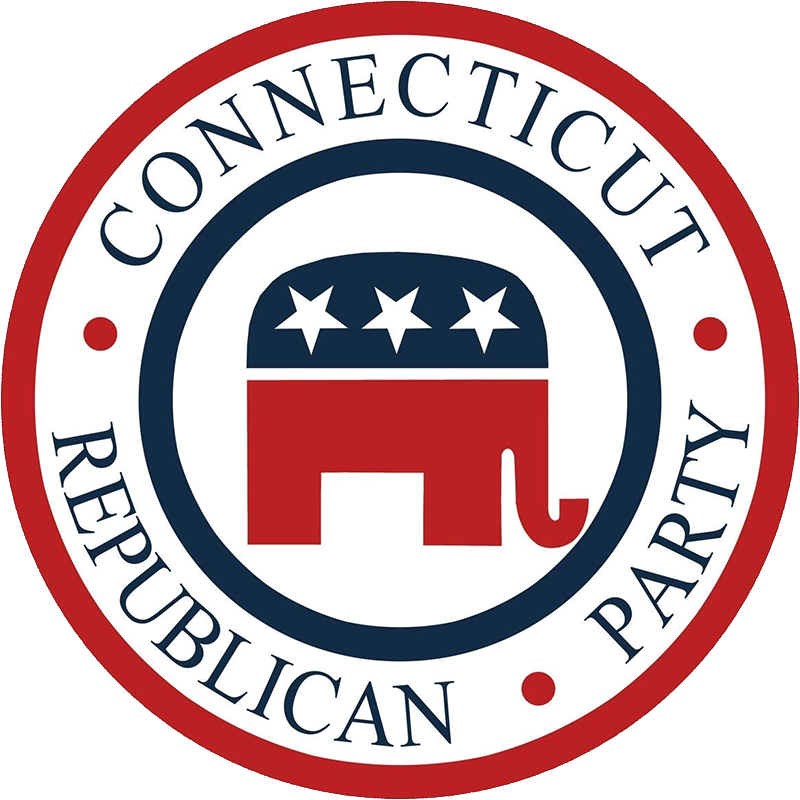
- Chairperson: Ben Proto
- Senate leader: Stephen G. Harding
- House leader: Vincent Candelora
- Headquarters: 98 Washington Street, Middletown, Connecticut 06457
- Membership (2025): 528,800
- Ideology: Conservatism
- Political position: Center-right to Right-wing
- National affiliation: Republican Party
- Colors: Red
- Seats in the U.S. Senate: 0 / 2
- Seats in the United States House of Representatives: 0 / 5
- Seats in the Connecticut State Senate: 12 / 36
- Seats in the Connecticut House of Representatives: 53 / 151

Election symbol

Website
- ct.gop

The Connecticut Republican Party is the Connecticut affiliate of the national Republican Party.

Republicans control neither chamber of the state legislature, no constitutional state offices, none of the state's five seats in the U.S. House, and neither of its two U.S. Senate seats. The last Republican to represent the state in the U.S. House was Chris Shays, who lost his seat in 2008 to Jim Himes. The last Republican to represent the state in the U.S. Senate was Lowell Weicker, who lost his seat in 1988 to Joe Lieberman.

== Town committees ==
In Connecticut, there are Republican town committees in all 169 Connecticut municipalities. The 169 Republican town committees are affiliates of the Connecticut Republican Party. Town committees have the ability to endorse candidates in primary elections for local office.

== Elected officials ==
=== Members of Congress ===
==== U.S. Senate ====
- None

Both of Connecticut's U.S. Senate seats have been held by Democrats since 1989. Lowell Weicker was the last Republican to represent Connecticut in the U.S. Senate. First elected in 1970, Weicker lost his bid for a fourth term in 1988 to Joe Lieberman.

==== U.S. House of Representatives ====
- None

All five of Connecticut's congressional districts have been held by Democrats since 2009. The last Republican to represent Connecticut in the House of Representatives was Chris Shays. First elected in a 1987 special election, Shays was subsequently defeated by Democratic challenger Jim Himes in 2008.

=== Statewide offices ===
- None

Connecticut has not elected any GOP candidates to statewide office since 2006, when Jodi Rell was elected to a full term as governor. First elected as lieutenant governor in 1994, Rell assumed the position of governor in 2004 following the resignation of John G. Rowland. In 2010, Rell opted not to seek re-election to a second term. Former U.S. Ambassador Thomas C. Foley ran as the Republican nominee in the 2010 election and was subsequently defeated by Democratic challenger Dannel Malloy.

=== State legislative leaders ===
- Senate Minority Leader: Stephen G. Harding
- House Minority Leader: Vincent Candelora

== Republican National Committee members ==
- Committeeman: Benjamin Proto
- Committeeman: John H. Frey
- Committeewoman: Annalisa Stravato

== List of chairs of the Connecticut Republican Party ==
Chairman	Town	Tenure
Ben Proto	Stratford	2021–present
Susan Hatfield	Pomfret	2021
J.R. Romano	Derby	2015–2021
Jerry Labriola Jr.	Wallingford	2011–2015
Chris C. Healy	Wethersfield	2007–2011
Herbert J. Shepardson	West Hartford	2003–2005
Chris DePino	New Haven	1996–2003
John A. Mastropietro	Watertown	1993–1996
Richard Foley	Oxford	1989–1992
Robert S. Poliner	Durham	1987–1989
Thomas J. D'Amore Jr.	New Hartford	1983–1987
Ralph E. Capecelatro	Orange	1980–1983
Frederick Biebel	Stratford	1975–1980
Vincent A. Laudone	Norwich	1974–1975
J. Brian Gaffney	New Britain	1971–1974
Howard E. Hausman	New Britain	1967–1971
A. Searle Pinney	Brookfield	1961–1966
Edwin H. May Jr.	Wethersfield	1958–1961
Clarence F. Baldwin	Woodbridge	1949–1959
Harold E. Mitchell	West Hartford	1945–1948
J. Kenneth Bradley	Westport	1940–1945
Benjamin E. Harwood	Chester	1937–1940
J. Henry Roraback	North Canaan	1912–1937
Michael Kenealy	Stamford	1905–1912
Andrew F. Gates	Hartford	1903–1905
Orsamus Fyler	Torrington	1896–1903
Herbert E. Benton	New Haven	1890–1896
