= 1980 Connecticut Senate election =

- November 4, 1980

All 36 seats in the Connecticut State Senate 19 seats needed for a majority
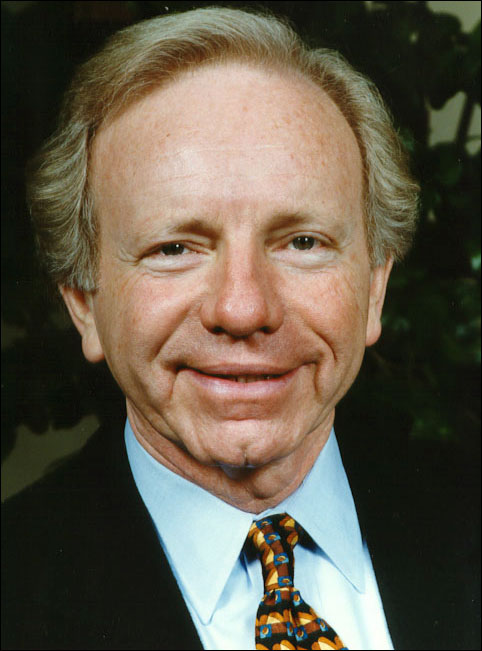

	Majority party	Minority party
Leader	Joe Lieberman (retired)	Richard C. Bozzuto (retired)
Party	Democratic	Republican
Leader since	January 8, 1975	January 3, 1979
Leader's seat	District 10	District 32
Last election	26	10
Seats after	23	13
Seat change	▼3	▲3
Popular vote	666,008	651,147
Percentage	50.56%	49.43%
President pro tempore before election
Joseph J. Fauliso
Democratic
Elected President pro tempore
James J. Murphy Jr.
Democratic

The 1980 Connecticut Senate election was held on November 4, 1980, to determine which party would control the Connecticut State Senate for the following two years. All 36 seats in the Connecticut State Senate were up for election. Prior to the election, 26 seats were held by Democrats and 10 seats were held by Republicans. The general election saw Republicans flip 3 seats, this however meant that Democrats retained their majority in the State Senate.

== Retirements ==
=== Democrats ===
1. District 2: Sanford Cloud Jr. retired.
2. District 10: Joe Lieberman retired to unsuccessfully run for Connecticut's 3rd congressional district.
3. District 23: Salvatore C. DePiano retired.

=== Republicans ===
1. District 32: Richard C. Bozzuto retired to unsuccessfully run for U.S. Senator of Connecticut.
2. District 34: Lawrence J. DeNardis retired to successfully run for Connecticut's 3rd congressional district.

== Defeated incumbents ==
=== In general ===
==== Democrats ====
1. District 4: Abraham Glassman lost re-election to Carl A. Zinsser.
2. District 14: John D. Prete lost re-election to Tom Scott.
3. District 15: Louis S. Cutillo lost re-election to Jerry Labriola.
4. District 30: Joseph A. Ruggiero lost re-election to M. Adela Eads.

==== Republicans ====
1. District 27: Richard Cunningham lost re-election to Thom Serrani.

== Closest races ==
Seats where the margin of victory was under 10%:

1. District 4, 0.2% (gain)
2. District 5, 0.2%
3. District 9, 1.2%
4. District 33, 1.2%
5. District 12, 1.6%
6. District 24, 2.0%
7. District 30, 5.4% (gain)
8. District 35, 7.0%
9. District 27, 7.2% (gain)
10. District 17, 8.8%

== Results ==
=== District 1 ===
District 1 election, 1980
Party	Candidate	Votes	%
Democratic	Joseph J. Fauliso (incumbent)	16,335	76.0%
Republican	Donald B. LaCroix	5,151	24.0%
Total votes		21,486	100.0%
Democratic hold			

=== District 2 ===
District 2 election, 1980
Party	Candidate	Votes	%
Democratic	Wilber G. Smith	15,957	81.4%
Republican	Gha-Is Muhammad	3,641	18.6%
Total votes		19,598	100.0%
Democratic hold			

=== District 3 ===
District 3 election, 1980
Party	Candidate	Votes	%
Democratic	Marcella Fahey (incumbent)	21,480	65.5%
Republican	Edward J. Wilson	11,304	34.5%
Total votes		32,784	100.0%
Democratic hold			

=== District 4 ===
District 4 election, 1980
Party	Candidate	Votes	%
Republican	Carl A. Zinsser	23,234	50.1%
Democratic	Abraham Glassman (incumbent)	23,154	49.9%
Total votes		46,388	100.0%
Republican gain from Democratic			

=== District 5 ===
District 5 election, 1980
Party	Candidate	Votes	%
Democratic	Clifton A. Leonhardt (incumbent)	24,200	50.1%
Republican	Charles R. Matties	24,114	49.9%
Total votes		48,314	100.0%
Democratic hold			

=== District 6 ===
District 6 election, 1980
Party	Candidate	Votes	%
Republican	Nancy Johnson (incumbent)	18,154	65.7%
Democratic	John V. Zisk Jr.	9,475	34.3%
Total votes		27,629	100.0%
Republican hold			

=== District 7 ===
District 7 election, 1980
Party	Candidate	Votes	%
Democratic	Cornelius O'Leary (incumbent)	22,553	62.2%
Republican	Barbara F. Chain	13,687	37.8%
Total votes		36,240	100.0%
Democratic hold			

=== District 8 ===
District 8 election, 1980
Party	Candidate	Votes	%
Republican	Russell L. Post Jr. (incumbent)	27,653	59.4%
Democratic	John D. McKeon	18,911	40.6%
Total votes		46,564	100.0%
Republican hold			

=== District 9 ===
District 9 election, 1980
Party	Candidate	Votes	%
Democratic	Bill Curry (incumbent)	24,840	50.6%
Republican	Charles E. Alfano	24,241	49.4%
Total votes		49,081	100.0%
Democratic hold			

=== District 10 ===
District 10 election, 1980
Party	Candidate	Votes	%
Democratic	John C. Daniels	18,431	67.7%
Republican	Brian F. Green	8,780	32.3%
Total votes		27,211	100.0%
Democratic hold			

=== District 11 ===
District 11 election, 1980
Party	Candidate	Votes	%
Democratic	Anthony M. Ciarlone (incumbent)	16,436	63.7%
Republican	Elaine W. Noe	9,176	35.6%
Independent	James J. Valenti	189	0.7%
Total votes		25,801	100.0%
Democratic hold			

=== District 12 ===
District 12 election, 1980
Party	Candidate	Votes	%
Democratic	Regina R. Smith (incumbent)	21,664	50.8%
Republican	Joseph J. Cretella Jr.	20,959	49.2%
Total votes		42,623	100.0%
Democratic hold			

=== District 13 ===
District 13 election, 1980
Party	Candidate	Votes	%
Democratic	Amelia Mustone (incumbent)	21,082	60.3%
Republican	Robert Chuck Lockert	13,892	39.7%
Total votes		34,974	100.0%
Democratic hold			

=== District 14 ===
District 14 election, 1980
Party	Candidate	Votes	%
Republican	Tom Scott	21,809	55.4%
Democratic	John D. Prete (incumbent)	17,564	44.6%
Total votes		39,373	100.0%
Republican gain from Democratic			

=== District 15 ===
District 15 election, 1980
Party	Candidate	Votes	%
Republican	Jerry Labriola	18,665	56.3%
Democratic	Louis S. Cutillo (incumbent)	14,475	43.7%
Total votes		33,140	100.0%
Republican gain from Democratic			

=== District 16 ===
District 16 election, 1980
Party	Candidate	Votes	%
Democratic	William J. Sullivan (incumbent)	19,114	56.6%
Republican	Dante Carrafa	14,683	43.4%
Total votes		33,797	100.0%
Democratic hold			

=== District 17 ===
District 17 election, 1980
Party	Candidate	Votes	%
Democratic	Eugene A Skowronski (incumbent)	20,950	54.4%
Republican	Alyce A. Samuelson	17,529	45.6%
Total votes		38,479	100.0%
Democratic hold			

=== District 18 ===
District 18 election, 1980
Party	Candidate	Votes	%
Democratic	Mary A. Martin (incumbent)	18,050	58.9%
Republican	Carl V. Stockwell	12,617	41.1%
Total votes		30,667	100.0%
Democratic hold			

=== District 19 ===
District 19 election, 1980
Party	Candidate	Votes	%
Democratic	James J. Murphy Jr. (incumbent)	20,858	58.3%
Republican	Reginald L Lewis Jr.	14,948	41.7%
Total votes		35,806	100.0%
Democratic hold			

=== District 20 ===
District 20 election, 1980
Party	Candidate	Votes	%
Democratic	Richard F. Schneller (incumbent)	21,769	56.0%
Republican	Sidney J. Holbrook	17,085	44.0%
Total votes		38,854	100.0%
Democratic hold			

=== District 21 ===
District 21 election, 1980
Party	Candidate	Votes	%
Republican	George Gunther (incumbent)	24,509	63.7%
Democratic	John W. Sober	13,974	36.3%
Total votes		38,483	100.0%
Republican hold			

=== District 22 ===
District 22 election, 1980
Party	Candidate	Votes	%
Democratic	Howard T. Owens Jr. (incumbent)	16,690	55.0%
Republican	C. David Munich	13,658	45.0%
Total votes		30,348	100.0%
Democratic hold			

=== District 23 ===
District 23 election, 1980
Party	Candidate	Votes	%
Democratic	Margaret E. Morton	12,158	65.2%
Republican	Alexander Brown	6,485	34.8%
Total votes		18,643	100.0%
Democratic hold			

=== District 24 ===
District 24 election, 1980
Party	Candidate	Votes	%
Democratic	Wayne A. Baker (incumbent)	21,049	51.0%
Republican	Fred V. Miller	20,201	49.0%
Total votes		41,250	100.0%
Democratic hold			

=== District 25 ===
District 25 election, 1980
Party	Candidate	Votes	%
Republican	Alfred Santaniello Jr. (incumbent)	21,112	64.7%
Democratic	Sylvester Maultsby	11,460	35.2%
Total votes		32,572	100.0%
Republican hold			

=== District 26 ===
District 26 election, 1980
Party	Candidate	Votes	%
Republican	John G. Matthews (incumbent)	32,498	73.3%
Democratic	Richard H. Saxl	11,826	26.7%
Total votes		44,324	100.0%
Republican hold			

=== District 27 ===
District 27 election, 1980
Party	Candidate	Votes	%
Democratic	Thom Serrani	19,073	53.6%
Republican	Richard Cunningham (incumbent)	16,540	46.4%
Total votes		35,613	100.0%
Democratic gain from Republican			

=== District 28 ===
District 28 election, 1980
Party	Candidate	Votes	%
Republican	Myron R. Ballen (incumbent)	25,587	59.1%
Democratic	John F. Fallon	17,717	40.9%
Total votes		43,304	100.0%
Republican hold			

=== District 29 ===
District 29 election, 1980
Party	Candidate	Votes	%
Democratic	Audrey P. Beck (incumbent)	19,834	61.4%
Republican	Robert L. Lambert	12,466	38.6%
Total votes		32,300	100.0%
Democratic hold			

=== District 30 ===
District 30 election, 1980
Party	Candidate	Votes	%
Republican	M. Adela Eads	22,902	52.7%
Democratic	Joseph A Ruggiero (incumbent)	20,590	47.3%
Total votes		43,492	100.0%
Republican gain from Democratic			

=== District 31 ===
District 31 election, 1980
Party	Candidate	Votes	%
Democratic	Steven C. Casey (incumbent)	22,489	63.2%
Republican	Joseph Pugliese	13,089	36.8%
Total votes		35,578	100.0%
Democratic hold			

=== District 32 ===
District 32 election, 1980
Party	Candidate	Votes	%
Republican	William F. Rogers III	29,604	63.2%
Democratic	Sean C. Butterly	17,261	36.8%
Total votes		46,865	100.0%
Republican hold			

=== District 33 ===
District 33 election, 1980
Party	Candidate	Votes	%
Democratic	Frederick R. Knous (incumbent)	23,119	50.6%
Republican	Douglas E. Smart	22,575	49.4%
Total votes		45,694	100.0%
Democratic hold			

=== District 34 ===
District 34 election, 1980
Party	Candidate	Votes	%
Republican	Philip S. Robertson	25,084	60.4%
Democratic	John P. McManus	16,432	39.6%
Total votes		41,516	100.0%
Republican hold			

=== District 35 ===
District 35 election, 1980
Party	Candidate	Votes	%
Democratic	Michael J. Skelley (incumbent)	22,342	53.5%
Republican	Claire H. Frier	19,419	46.5%
Total votes		41,761	100.0%
Democratic hold			

=== District 36 ===
District 36 election, 1980
Party	Candidate	Votes	%
Republican	Michael L. Morano (incumbent)	24,096	65.5%
Democratic	Suzanne E. Bailey	12,696	34.5%
Total votes		36,792	100.0%
Republican hold			
