= 1982 Connecticut gubernatorial election =

- November 2, 1982
- Turnout: 67.5%
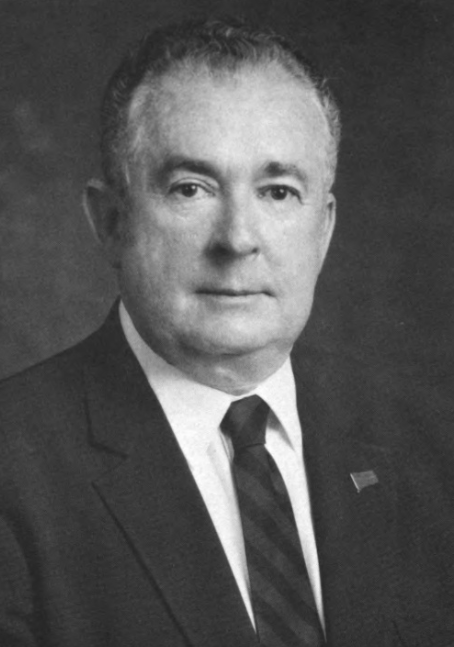

Nominee	Bill O'Neill	Lewis Rome
Party	Democratic	Republican
Running mate	Joseph J. Fauliso	Gerald Labriola
Popular vote	578,264	497,773
Percentage	53.35%	45.93%
- O'Neill: 40–50% 50–60% 60–70% 70–80% Rome: 40–50% 50–60% 60–70% 70–80%
Governor before election
Bill O'Neill
Democratic
Elected Governor
Bill O'Neill
Democratic

The 1982 Connecticut gubernatorial election took place on November 2, 1982. Incumbent Democratic governor Bill O'Neill had assumed the governor's office in 1980 after Ella Grasso resigned due to poor health. Grasso died just weeks later on February 5, 1981. Governor O'Neill defeated former Connecticut state senator Lewis Rome for his first full term in the governor's office.

== Democratic primary ==
=== Candidates ===
==== Nominee ====
- Bill O'Neill, incumbent governor

==== Eliminated at convention ====
- Ernest N. Abate, Speaker of the Connecticut House of Representatives.

== Republican primary ==
=== Candidates ===
==== Nominee ====
- Lewis Rome, former Senate majority leader from the 8th district, former mayor of Bloomfield, and candidate for this seat in 1978.

==== Eliminated at convention ====
- Gerald Labriola, state senator from the 15th district. (Later became lieutenant governor nominee).

==== Withdrew after convention ====
- Richard C. Bozzuto, former Senate minority leader from the 32nd district and candidate for U.S. Senate in 1980.

==== Withdrew before convention ====
- Russell L. Post Jr., state senator from the 8th district.

July 24, Republican convention. (First round)
Party	Candidate	Votes	%
Republican	Lewis Rome	414	44.61%
Republican	Richard C. Bozzuto	392	42.25%
Republican	Jerry Labriola	122	13.14%
Total votes		928	100.00%

After the first round of voting, Labriola withdrew, not reaching the 20% threshold needed to enter a primary. He freed his delegates 'to support the candidates of their choice.' He added, however, that his personal choice was Rome.

July 24, Republican convention. (Second round)
Party	Candidate	Votes	%
Republican	Lewis Rome	488	52.47%
Republican	Richard C. Bozzuto	442	47.53%
Total votes		930	100.00%

Although he met the threshold standards to launch a primary, on August 4, eleven days after the convention, Bozzuto finally announced that he would not seek a primary against Rome.

== Results ==
1982 Connecticut gubernatorial election
Party	Candidate	Votes	%	±%
Democratic	Bill O'Neill (incumbent)	578,264	53.35%	−5.80%
Republican	Lewis Rome	497,773	45.93%	+5.19%
Libertarian	Walter Gengarelly	7,839	0.72%	N/A
Total votes		1,083,876	100.00%	N/A
Democratic hold				
