= Lewis Rome =

American politician (1933–2015)

Lewis B. Rome

Member of the Connecticut State Senate from the 8th district
- In office January 6, 1971 – January 3, 1979
- Preceded by: Wallace Barnes
- Succeeded by: Russell L. Post Jr.

Majority Leader of the Connecticut State Senate
- In office 1973–1975

Minority Leader of the Connecticut State Senate
- In office 1975–1979

Personal details
- Born: September 12, 1933 Hartford, Connecticut, US
- Died: July 1, 2015 (aged 81)
- Party: Republican
- Education: University of Connecticut (BA, LLB)
- Occupation: Politician, lawyer

Lewis "Lew" B. Rome (September 12, 1933 – July 1, 2015) was an American attorney and politician who served in the Connecticut State Senate and ran unsuccessfully as the Republican Party nominee in the 1982 Connecticut gubernatorial election.

== Early life and education ==
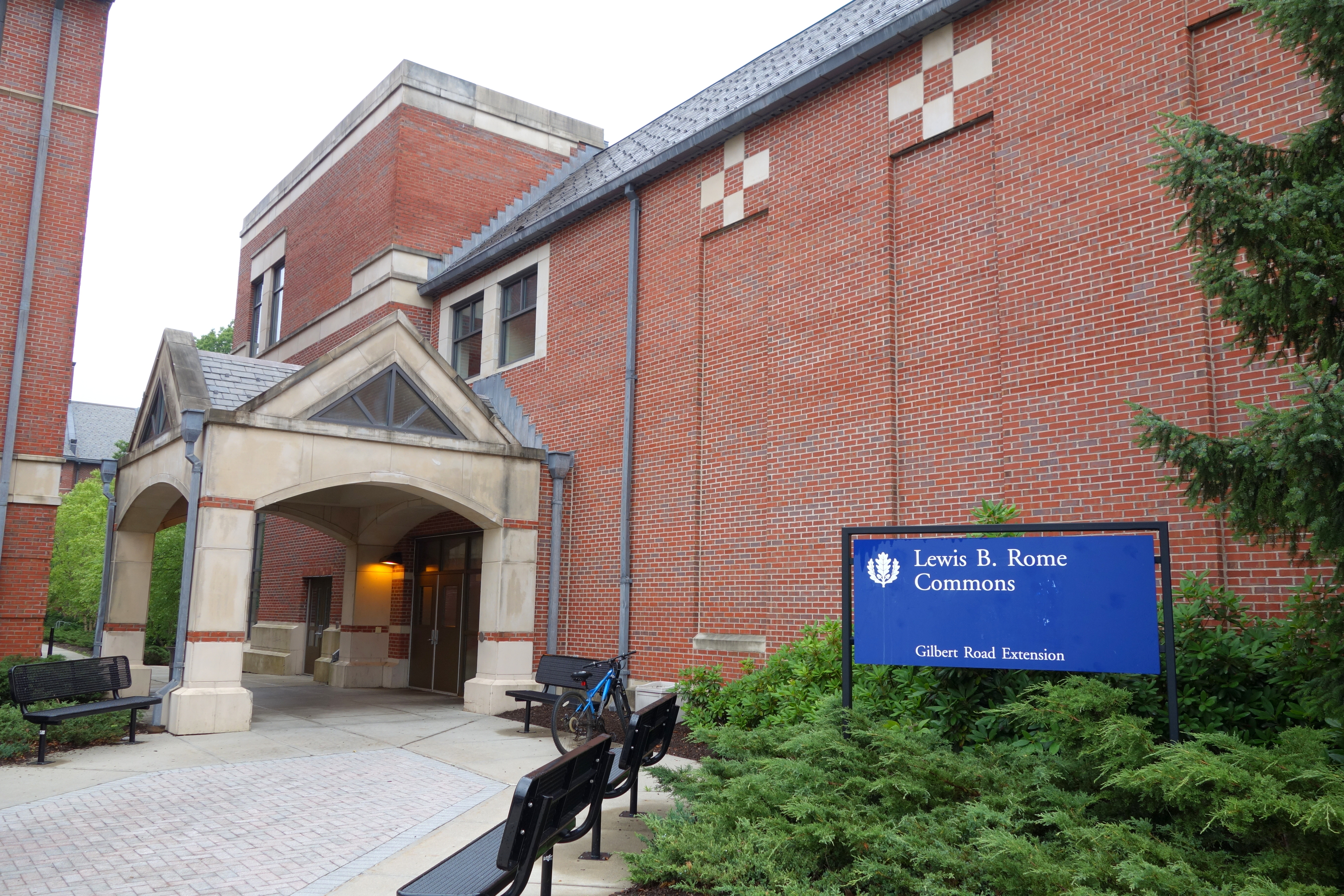
Lewis B. Rome Commons building at the University of Connecticut

Rome was born in Hartford, Connecticut, on September 12, 1933, to parents Albert and Celia (Sabol) Rome. Graduating from Bloomfield High School in 1950, Rome earned his Bachelor of Arts degree in history from the University of Connecticut in 1954 and his Bachelor of Laws (LLB) degree from the University of Connecticut School of Law in 1957. He founded a private practice law firm in Bloomfield and practiced law throughout his life.

== Political career ==
Rome served on the town council of Bloomfield (1961–1969) and as town mayor (1965–1969). He was elected to represent Connecticut's 8th Senate district in 1970, representing the towns of Bloomfield, Canton, East Granby, East Windsor, Enfield, Granby, Hartland, Simsbury, Suffield, Windsor, and Windsor Locks. After serving only one two-year term of office (1971–73), Rome was selected by his Republican Party colleagues to serve as the state senate's majority leader (1973–75) and minority leader (1975–79). Rome earned a reputation for pragmatism and bipartisanship. In 1975 and 1976, he was elected to the Executive Committee of the National Conference of State Legislatures and chaired its nominating committee.

In the 1978 Connecticut gubernatorial election, he was the Republican Party nominee for lieutenant governor, but his ticket was resoundingly defeated by Democratic Party incumbents Ella Grasso and William O'Neill. Four years later, Rome ran a spirited campaign for governor but lost the 1982 election to O'Neill, despite receiving endorsements from fifty-nine of Connecticut's leading newspapers as well as from the New York Times.

Rome's loss marked the end of his career in elected office. He returned to private law practice and also founded a lobbying firm.

== Later career ==
Rome was a lifelong advocate for the University of Connecticut. As a legislator, he championed the establishment of the UConn Health Center in the 1970s. After quitting politics, he served on the Connecticut Department of Higher Education Task Force (1984–86) and on UConn's Task Force on Athletics (1986–89). Rome was rumored to be a candidate for UConn president in 1990, though Harry J. Hartley was ultimately appointed.

In 1992, Governor Lowell Weicker appointed Rome chair of UConn's board of trustees. Serving until 1997, Rome was instrumental in securing passage of the UConn 2000 legislation, which committed $1 billion in state funding to renew the university's infrastructure. Over time, he also developed a strong working relationship with Hartley. The Lewis B. Rome Commons building and ballroom on UConn's Storrs campus was named in his honor.

Rome was at the center of a major push to move the New England Patriots to Hartford. He called for the building of a new football stadium to be used by the UConn Huskies, as well as by the Patriots. Although the move fell through, the Huskies did get a new stadium at Rentschler Field, built in 2003.

Rome also advised the Mohegan Tribe during the 1990s, providing legal and lobbying support in the tribe's successful bid to achieve federal recognition and build the Mohegan Sun casino.

== Personal life ==
Rome was Jewish. He died following a long illness on July 1, 2015.

Rome was married twice. In 1954 he married Ann Kathleen (Nicolle) Rome, with whom he had four children: David, Deborah, Richard, and Thomas. The couple divorced in 1990. Rome remarried, to Kristine (Payne) Rome).

Party political offices
Preceded by Nathan Agostinelli	Republican nominee for Lieutenant Governor of Connecticut; 1978	Succeeded by Jerry Labriola
Preceded by Ronald A. Sarasin	Republican nominee for Governor of Connecticut; 1982	Succeeded by Julie Belaga
