= Julie Belaga =

American politician (1930–2021)

Member of the Connecticut House of Representatives from the 136th district
- In office January 5, 1977 – January 7, 1987
- Preceded by: Alan Harris Nevas
- Succeeded by: Jo Fuchs

Personal details
- Born: July 12, 1930 Boston, Massachusetts, U.S.
- Died: November 19, 2021 (aged 91) Westport, Connecticut, U.S.
- Party: Republican
- Education: Syracuse University (BA)

Julie D. Belaga (July 12, 1930 – November 19, 2021) was an American Republican politician in Connecticut.

== Early life ==
Belaga was born and raised in Boston, Massachusetts in July 1930. She was the daughter of Jewish immigrants. She moved to Connecticut with her family in 1965. Belaga received an education degree from Syracuse University.

== Political career ==
Belaga served as chair of the Westport Planning and Zoning Commission from 1972 to 1976.

She was elected to the Connecticut House of Representatives in 1976 and served there from 1977 until 1987. She had major legislative successes on a number of critical environmental issues. She took the lead in drafting and implementing Connecticut's coastal management laws that protect coastline and valuable resources. She served on Connecticut's water supply task force. She played an active role in the development of Connecticut's hazardous waste management service and was instrumental in realigning and reforming the Connecticut Resources Recovery Authority.

In 1986 Belaga chose not to run for re-election to seek the 1986 Republican nomination for governor. At the Republican state party convention in July 1986, Belaga did not receive the party nomination but received sufficient votes to qualify for a primary in September. At the convention, she was supported by liberal Republican leader and 1962 gubernatorial candidate John deKoven Alsop of Avon whose town was the first to cast its votes and who memorably announced his vote with the statement "the best man for the job is a woman". Belaga subsequently captured the party nomination in a three-way gubernatorial primary in September 1986, beating state senators Richard Bozzuto and Gerald Labriola, but lost the November election to Democratic governor William A. O'Neill.

In 1989 Belaga was appointed by George H. W. Bush as Region 1 (New England) Director of the United States Environmental Protection Agency (EPA). She was later appointed by Bill Clinton to the Export-Import Bank of the United States.

== See also ==
- List of U.S. political appointments that crossed party lines

Party political offices
Preceded by Lewis Rome	Republican nominee for Governor of Connecticut; 1986	Succeeded by John Rowland
