= 1974 Connecticut Attorney General election =

- November 5, 1974
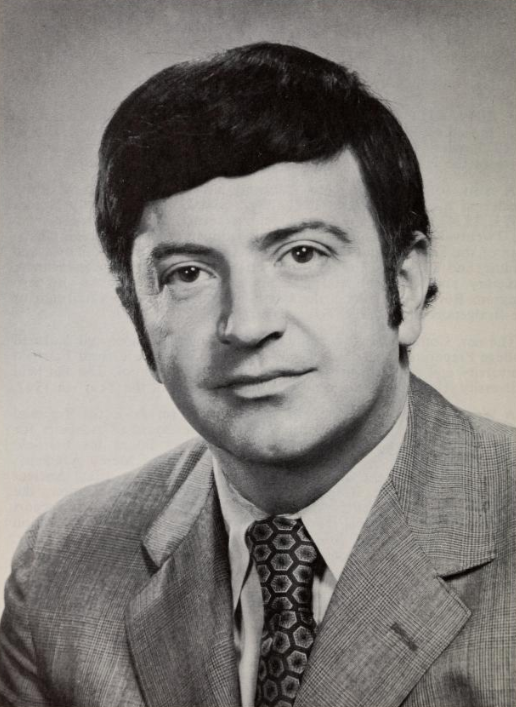

Nominee	Carl R. Ajello	James F. Bingham
Party	Democratic	Republican
Popular vote	627,376	416,535
Percentage	60.1%	39.9%
- Ajello: 50–60% 60–70% 70–80% 80–90% Bingham: 50–60% 60–70% 70–80%
Attorney General before election
Robert K. Killian
Democratic
Elected Attorney General
Carl R. Ajello
Democratic

The 1974 Connecticut attorney general election took place on November 5, 1974, to elect the attorney general of Connecticut. Incumbent Democratic Attorney General Robert K. Killian did not seek re-election to a second term, instead opting to run for lieutenant governor. Democratic nominee and state representative Carl R. Ajello defeated Republican nominee and State Representative James F. Bingham.

== Democratic primary ==
=== Candidates ===
==== Nominee ====
- Carl R. Ajello, state representative from the 118th district (1963–1975)

== Republican primary ==
=== Candidates ===
==== Nominee ====
- James F. Bingham, state representative from the 157th district (1969–1973) and 147th district (1973–1975)

== General election ==
=== Results ===
1974 Connecticut attorney general election
Party	Candidate	Votes	%	±%
Democratic	Carl R. Ajello	627,376	60.10%	
Republican	James F. Bingham	416,535	39.90%	
Write-in	Write-ins	31	0.00%	N/A
Total votes		1,043,942	100.0%	
Democratic hold				
