= 1986 Connecticut gubernatorial election =

- November 4, 1986
- Turnout: 61.4%
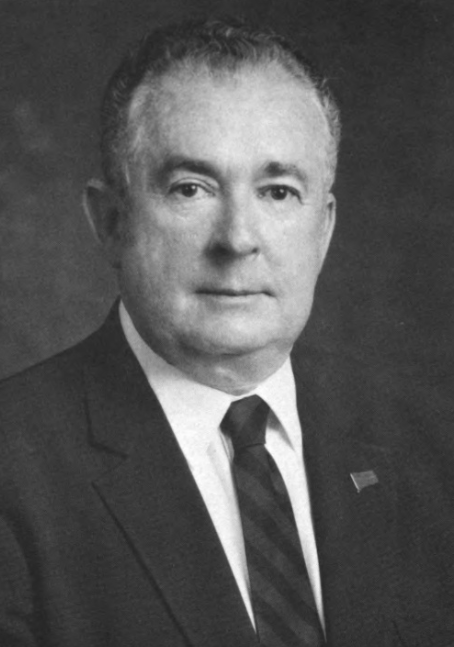

Nominee	Bill O'Neill	Julie Belaga
Party	Democratic	Republican
Running mate	Joseph J. Fauliso	E. Clayton Gengras, Jr.
Popular vote	575,638	408,489
Percentage	57.93%	41.11%
- O'Neill: 40–50% 50–60% 60–70% 70–80% Belaga: 40–50% 50–60% 60–70% 70–80% Tie
Governor before election
Bill O'Neill
Democratic
Elected Governor
Bill O'Neill
Democratic

The 1986 Connecticut gubernatorial election took place on November 4, 1986. Incumbent Democratic governor Bill O'Neill won his second full term against Republican assemblywoman Julie Belaga, who defeated Jerry Labriola for the Republican nomination. This election marked the last time a Democrat would win the governorship in Connecticut until the 2010 election, the last time a Democratic gubernatorial candidate has won every county in the state and the last time a Democrat won by a margin of larger than five percent until the 2022 election.

== Democratic primary ==
=== Candidates ===
==== Nominee ====
- Bill O'Neill, incumbent governor

==== Eliminated at convention ====
- Toby Moffett, former U.S. Representative from the 6th district (1975-1983) and candidate for U.S. Senate in 1982

== Election results ==
1986 Connecticut gubernatorial election
Party	Candidate	Votes	%	±%
Democratic	Bill O'Neill (incumbent)	575,638	57.93%	+4.58%
Republican	Julie Belaga	408,489	41.11%	−4.82%
Independent	Frank Longo	9,565	0.96%	N/A
Total votes		984,127	100.00%	N/A
Democratic hold				
