= Zena Temkin =

American politician (1923–2017)

Member of the Connecticut House of Representatives from Torrington
- In office 1959–1963 Serving with John A. Miscikoski
- Preceded by: Mary Fahey; Gennaro Piscitelli
- Succeeded by: John A. Miscikoski; P. Edmund Power

Personal details
- Born: 1923 London, England
- Died: May 8, 2017 (aged 93)
- Party: Democratic
- Spouse: Isadore Benjerman Temkin (m. 1943; died 2015)
- Children: 3
- Education: Agnes Scott College (BA); Georgia Tech

Zena Doris Marguerite Harris Temkin (1923 – May 8, 2017) was an American politician who served in the Connecticut House of Representatives from 1959 to 1963, representing the city of Torrington as a Democrat.

== Personal life and education ==
Temkin was born in London, England, in 1923. She moved to the U.S. when she was eleven and graduated from high school in Detroit, Michigan. She later moved to Atlanta, Georgia, and graduated from Agnes Scott College in nearby Decatur with a bachelor's degree in English Literature and Speech. She also attended the Georgia Tech School of Architecture and would later work as an architect. Temkin married Dr. Isadore Benjerman Temkin in 1943, and together they had three children.

In 1947, they moved to Torrington, Connecticut, where Isadore opened a dental practice, and Zena worked various jobs, including as a radio show host and writer, before entering politics. In 1997, the couple founded WAPJ, an FM radio station in Torrington.

Temkin died on May 8, 2017. She was 93.

== Political career ==
Temkin was elected to the Connecticut House of Representatives in 1958 to serve as one of two representatives from the city of Torrington. She served alongside fellow Democrat John A. Miscikoski for two terms and did not run for reelection in 1962.

Following her service in the Connecticut House of Representatives, Temkin worked as an aide to Abe Ribicoff, assisting in two of his campaigns for the U.S. Senate. She later served as an aide to Ella Grasso and coordinated Grasso's 1970 and 1972 campaigns for the U.S. House of Representatives, as well as Grasso's 1974 campaign for governor of Connecticut. In 1980 and 1982, she assisted with Chris Dodd's campaign for the U.S. Senate.

Temkin was a delegate to the 1960 and 1984 Democratic National Conventions. She was a delegate to the White House Conference on Aging in 1995.
