= Carl R. Ajello =

American politician (1932–2025)

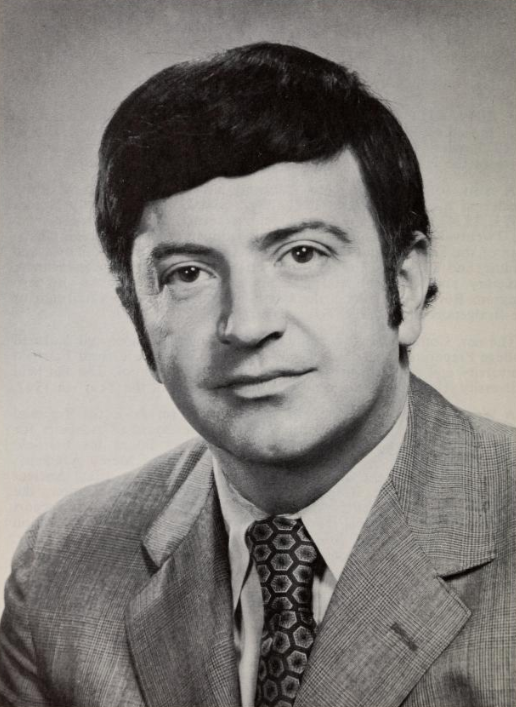

20th Connecticut Attorney General
- In office January 1975 – January 1983
- Governor: Ella Grasso; William A. O'Neill
- Preceded by: Robert K. Killian
- Succeeded by: Joe Lieberman

Personal details
- Born: August 22, 1932 Ansonia, Connecticut, U.S.
- Died: June 1, 2025 (aged 92)
- Party: Democratic
- Children: 2
- Education: University of Connecticut; New York University School of Law

Carl R. Ajello (August 22, 1932 – June 1, 2025) was an American politician who was the 20th Attorney General of Connecticut, serving from 1975 to 1983.

== Early life and career ==
Ajello was born in Ansonia, Connecticut, on August 22, 1932, to Carl and Kathryn Flanagan Ajello. He attended public schools in Ansonia before graduated with a Bachelor of Science from the University of Connecticut in 1953. He then went to graduate school, receiving a LL.B. and J.D.S. in law from New York University School of Law in 1956.

He later enlisted in the U.S. Army, serving in the Judge Advocate General's Corps from 1957 to 1960. He was lieutenant when he first enlisted and honorably discharged as a captain.

== Political and judicial career ==
Ajello, a member of the Democratic Party, was elected Justice of the Peace for the city of Ansonia for the 1960–1962 term; he also served as Corporation Counsel for Ansonia from 1965 to 1968. He was elected as a member of the Connecticut General Assembly in 1963, and served as the Assistant House Majority Leader in the 1967 session, House Majority Leader in the 1969 and 1971–1972 sessions; House Minority Leader in the 1973–1974 sessions.

He was elected Connecticut Attorney General in 1974 and re-elected in 1978, serving two terms from 1975 to 1983. In 1978 he was elected, by his peers, as President of the National Association of Attorneys General.

== Personal life and death ==
Ajello resided in Hamden, Connecticut, having moved there from his original hometown of Ansonia, Connecticut, with his wife, Jacqueline. They have two children. He was a member of multiple legal associations, including the Connecticut Bar Association. Ajello died on June 1, 2025, at the age of 92.

Party political offices
Preceded by Robert K. Killian	Democratic nominee for Connecticut Attorney General; 1974, 1978	Succeeded by Joe Lieberman
Legal offices
Preceded by Robert K. Killian	Attorney General of Connecticut; 1975–1983	Succeeded by Joe Lieberman
