= 1974 Connecticut gubernatorial election =

- November 5, 1974
- Turnout: 72.0%
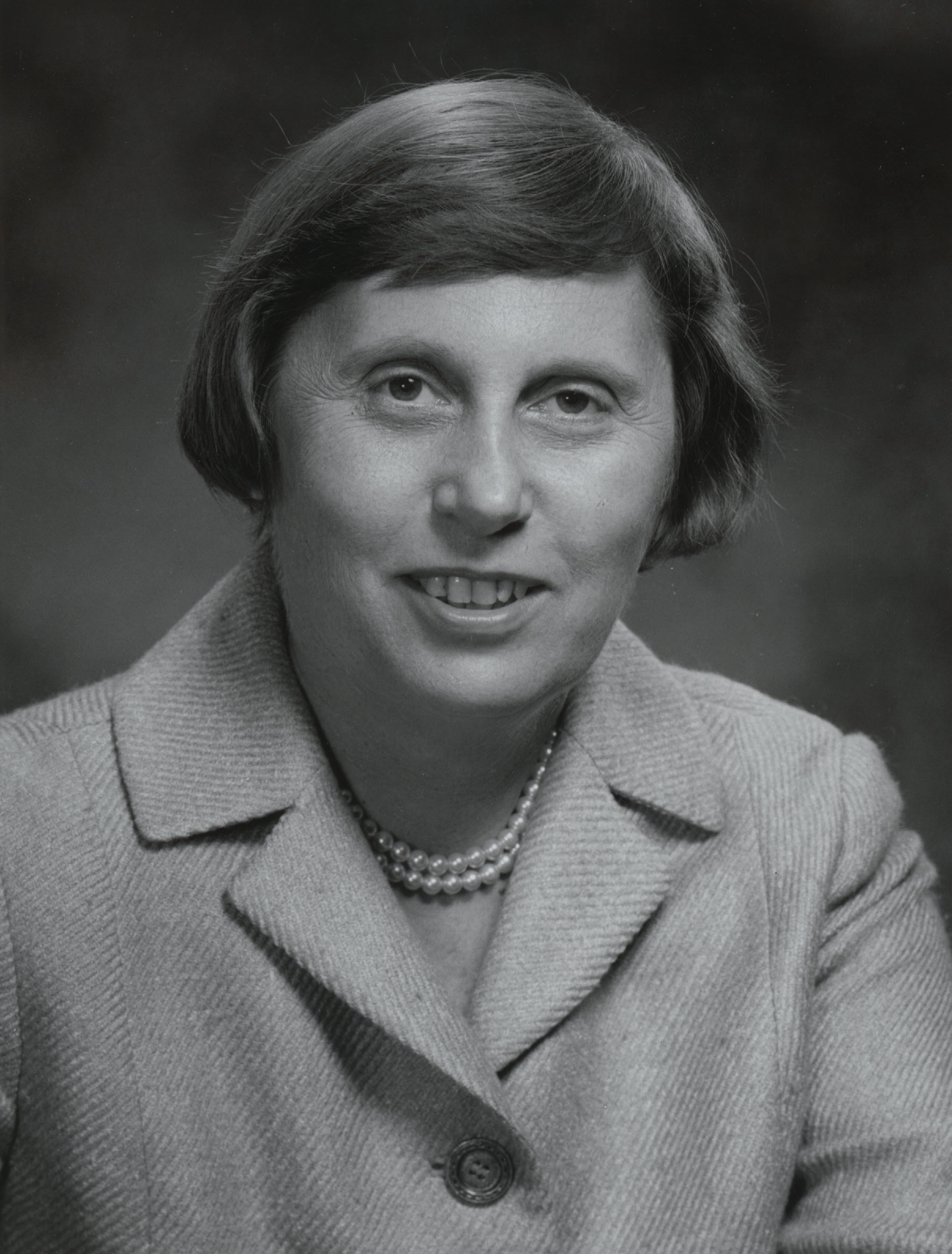

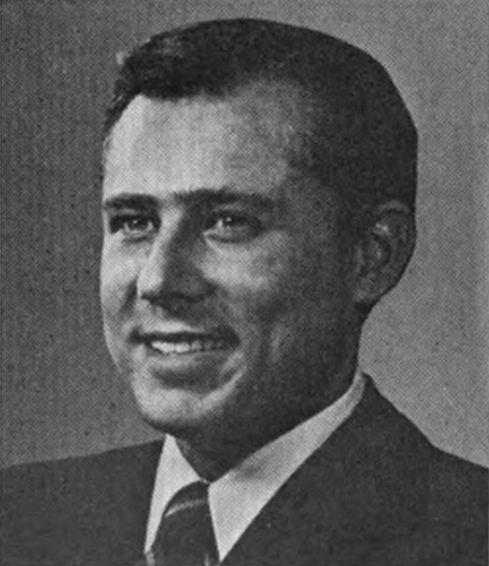
Nominee	Ella Grasso	Robert H. Steele
Party	Democratic	Republican
Running mate	Robert K. Killian	Nathan G. Agostinelli
Popular vote	643,490	440,169
Percentage	58.35%	39.92%
- Steele: 40–50% 50–60% 60–70% 70–80% Grasso: 40–50% 50–60% 60–70% 70–80% 80–90%
Governor before election
Thomas Meskill
Republican
Elected Governor
Ella Grasso
Democratic

The 1974 Connecticut gubernatorial election was held on November 5, 1974. Democratic nominee Ella Grasso defeated Republican nominee Robert H. Steele with 58.35% of the vote. Grasso thus became the first woman to be elected governor of Connecticut, and the first woman elected governor of a US state who was not the spouse or widow of a former governor.

== General election ==
=== Candidates ===
Major party candidates

- Ella Grasso, Democratic
- Robert H. Steele, Republican

Other candidates

- Thomas J. Pallone, George Wallace Party
- Allen C. Peichert, American

=== Results ===
1974 Connecticut gubernatorial election
Party	Candidate	Votes	%	±%
Democratic	Ella Grasso	643,490	58.35%	
Republican	Robert H. Steele	440,169	39.92%	
George Wallace Party	Thomas J. Pallone	16,660	1.51%	
American	Allen C. Peichert	2,291	0.21%	
Majority		203,321		
Turnout		1,102,773		
Democratic gain from Republican		Swing		
