= Ronald A. Sarasin =

American politician (1934–2023)

Ronald Sarasin
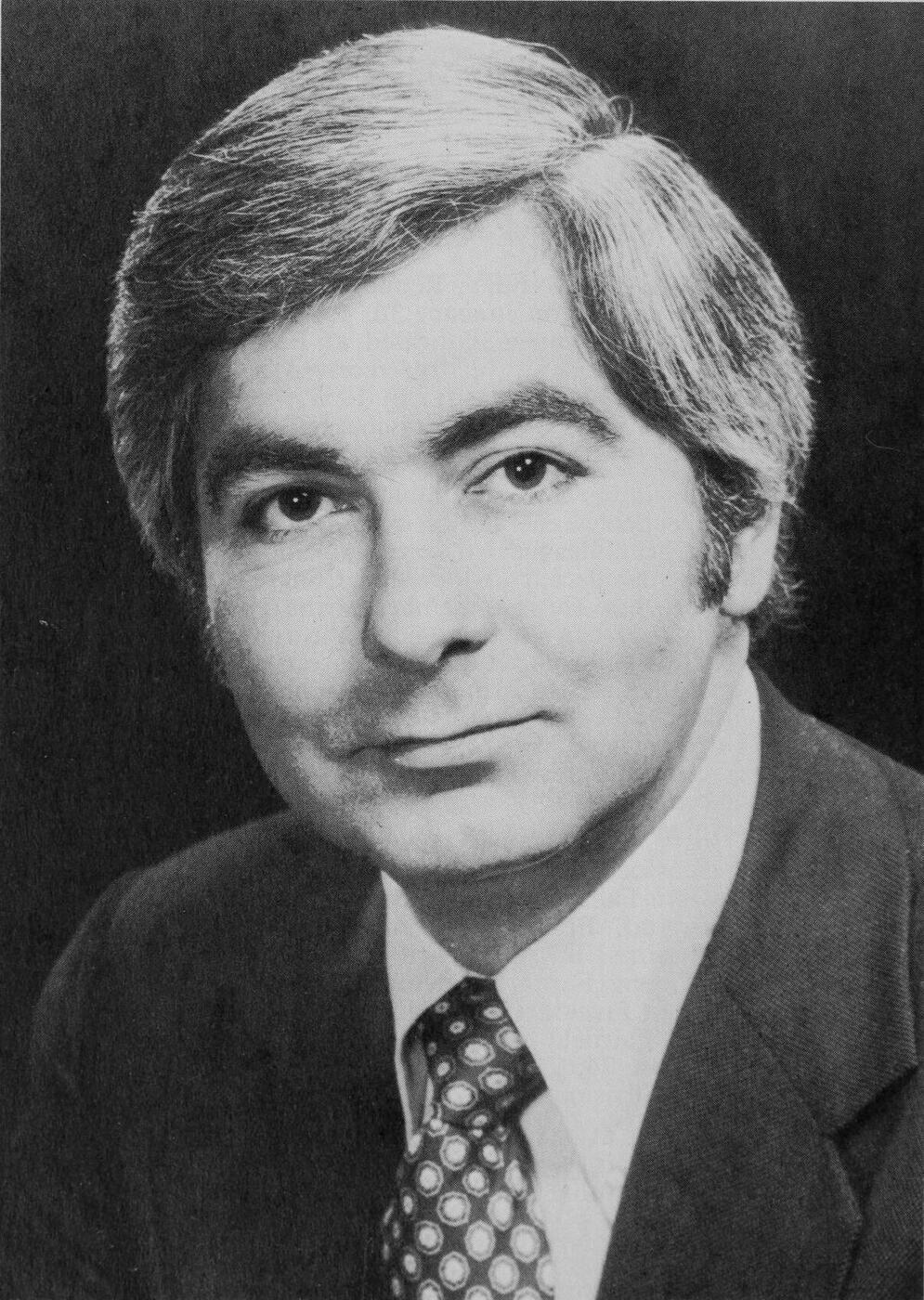

Member of the U.S. House of Representatives from Connecticut's 5th district
- In office January 3, 1973 – January 3, 1979
- Preceded by: John S. Monagan
- Succeeded by: William R. Ratchford

Member of the Connecticut House of Representatives from the 95th district
- In office January 1969 – January 1973
- Preceded by: Paul Pawlak Sr.
- Succeeded by: William P. Ambrogio

Town Counsel of Beacon Falls, Connecticut
- In office 1963–1972
- Town Clerk: Francis X. Doiron
- Preceded by: Howard D. Olderman
- Succeeded by: Neal B. Hanlon

Personal details
- Born: Ronald Arthur Sarasin; December 31, 1934 Fall River, Massachusetts, U.S.
- Died: March 27, 2023 (aged 88)
- Party: Republican
- Education: University of Connecticut (B.S., J.D.)

Military service
- Allegiance: United States
- Branch/service: United States Navy
- Years of service: 1952–1956
- Rank: Petty Officer Second Class

Ronald Arthur Sarasin (December 31, 1934 – March 27, 2023) was an American lawyer, Navy veteran, and politician from Connecticut. He served two terms in the Connecticut House of Representatives and three terms as a U.S. representative from 1973 to 1979.

== Political career ==
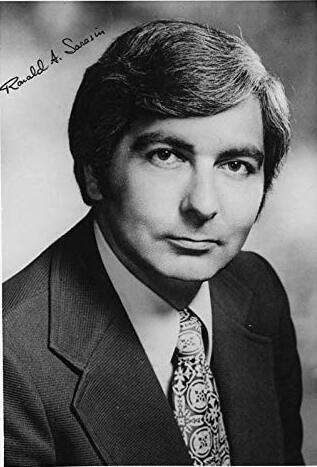
Sarasin (c. 1970s

He was first elected to the Connecticut House of Representatives in 1968 and became the assistant minority leader in 1970. In 1972, he ran for Congress from the 5th district against John Monagan, a seven-term veteran of the House. Redistricting added several Republican areas to the 5th in 1972 and George McGovern’s poor showing in the 1972 presidential election was hurting Democrats in down-ballot races.

In 1974, he ran for re-election against State Representative William R. Ratchford, the speaker of the Connecticut State House. Sarasin prevailed amidst the wave of Republican losses to the Watergate babies. Ratchford would eventually win election to Congress after Sarasin vacated the seat to run for governor.

In 1978, Sarasin secured the Republican nomination for Governor of Connecticut with Lewis Rome as his running mate. His opponent was the incumbent, Ella Grasso, the first woman to be elected governor in her own right. Sarasin attacked Grasso on taxes, promising to reduce taxes and cut welfare spending. On Election Day, Grasso won a second term in office with a convincing victory

== Later career ==
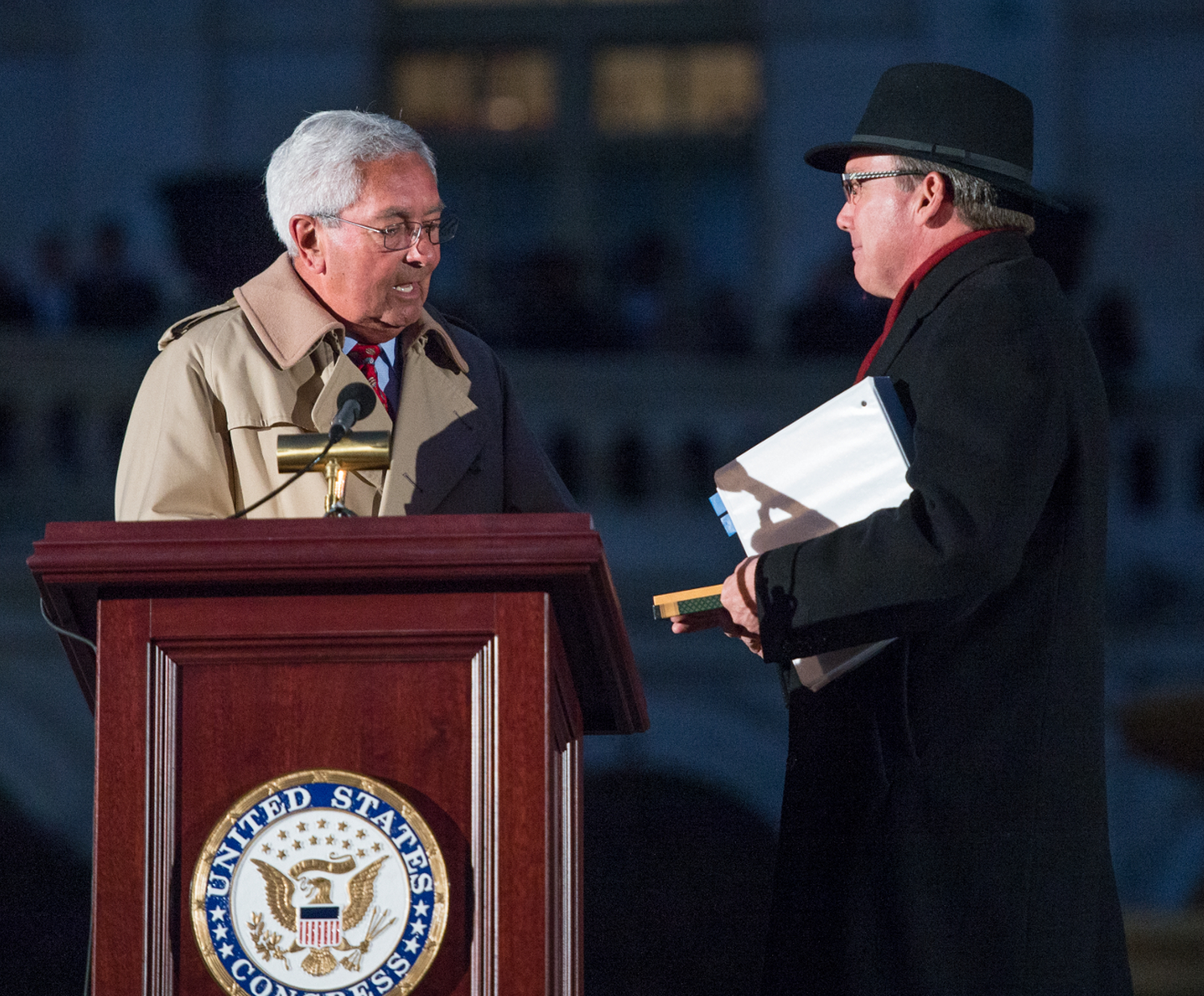
Stephen T. Ayers (left) and Sarasin in 2014

After leaving office, he was the chief lobbyist for the National Restaurant Association and president of the National Beer Wholesalers Association.

He served as president of the U.S. Capitol Historical Society from 2000 to 2019. He is credited with establishing a traveling exhibit on the role played by enslaved people in the building of the Capitol, as well as the initiation of the organization’s popular civics education program.

== Personal life ==
Sarasin was married to Marjorie Grazio Sarasin and has one son with her, Michael. He and his wife divorced in 1977. He was the first divorced candidate to run for governor.

In 1988, he married his second wife, Leslie Garmon Sarasin. They were married nearly 34 years, and have one son together, Douglas.

His brother Warren Sarasin, was also a politician who served in the Connecticut House of Representatives. He was first elected in 1978, the year his brother was defeated for governor.

Sarasin died on March 27, 2023, at the age of 88.

Party political offices
Preceded by Robert H. Steele	Republican nominee for Governor of Connecticut; 1978	Succeeded by Lewis Rome
U.S. House of Representatives
Preceded by John S. Monagan	Member of the U.S. House of Representatives from Connecticut's 5th congressional district 1973–1979	Succeeded by William R. Ratchford
