= Joseph J. Fauliso =

American politician (1916–2014)

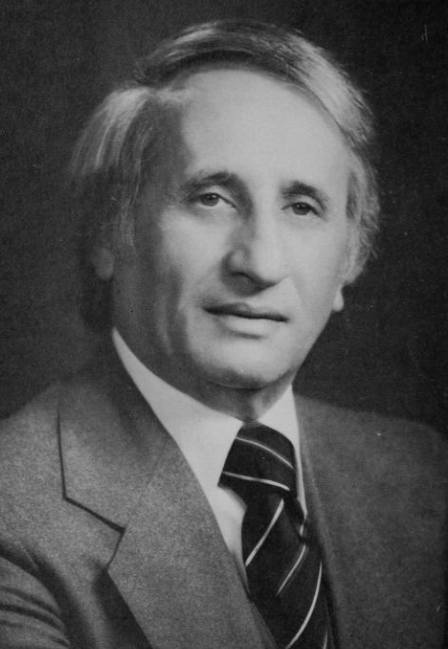

103rd Lieutenant Governor of Connecticut
- In office December 31, 1980 – January 9, 1991
- Governor: William A. O’Neill
- Preceded by: William A. O'Neill
- Succeeded by: Eunice Groark

Member of the Connecticut State Senate from the 1st district
- In office January 4, 1967 – December 31, 1980
- Preceded by: Thomas J. Kerrigan Jr.
- Succeeded by: William A. DiBella

Personal details
- Born: Joseph John Fauliso; February 16, 1916 Stonington, Connecticut
- Died: August 20, 2014 (aged 98) Hartford, Connecticut
- Party: Democratic
- Spouse: Ann-Marie Schwerdtfeger
- Education: Boston University Law School

Joseph John Fauliso (February 16, 1916 – August 20, 2014) was an American politician who was the 103rd lieutenant governor of Connecticut from 1980 to 1991.

== Early life ==
Fauliso was born in Stonington, Connecticut. He studied at Providence College and then studied law at Boston University Law School. He married Ann-Marie Schwerdtfeger and they have one son, Richard.

== Political career ==
Fauliso was an Alderman in Hartford and city and state judge before he was first elected into the Connecticut Senate in 1966. He served as President pro tempore of the Connecticut Senate. Early in 1980, he told his close friend, governor Ella T. Grasso, that he had decided not to seek reelection that year, after seven terms in the State Senate. Grasso then asked Fauliso to reconsider, because she needed him in the Senate for the final two years of her second term. He consulted with his family and close friends, and after a week told Grasso he would seek reelection. What he did not anticipate was that Grasso would resign on December 31, 1980, because she was dying from cancer. On that day, Lieutenant Governor William A. O'Neill became the new governor and Fauliso, as the newly reelected leader of the State Senate, automatically became Lieutenant Governor of Connecticut. Fauliso then stayed as lieutenant governor throughout the gubernatorial terms of O'Neill. They did not seek reelection in 1990 and served until January 9, 1991.

== Death ==
In 2014, he died in Hartford the age of 98.

== See also ==
- List of governors of Connecticut

Party political offices
Preceded by William A. O'Neill	Democratic nominee for Lieutenant Governor of Connecticut; 1982, 1986	Succeeded by Sandra Bender
Political offices
Preceded by William O'Neill	Lieutenant Governor of Connecticut; 1980-1991	Succeeded by Eunice Groark
