= Tyrique Jones =

American basketball player (born 1997)

- Jones with Olympiacos in 2026

No. 88 – Olympiacos
- Position: Center
- League: GBL; EuroLeague

Personal information
- Born: May 3, 1997 (age 29) Hartford, Connecticut, U.S.
- Listed height: 2.04 m (6 ft 8 in)
- Listed weight: 108 kg (238 lb)

Career information
- High school: Bloomfield (Bloomfield, Connecticut); Vermont Academy (Saxtons River, Vermont)
- College: Xavier (2016–2020)
- NBA draft: 2020: undrafted
- Playing career: 2020–present

Career history
- 2020: Wonju DB Promy
- 2020–2021: Hapoel Tel Aviv
- 2021–2022: Victoria Libertas
- 2022–2023: Türk Telekom
- 2023–2024: Anadolu Efes
- 2024–2026: Partizan
- 2026–present: Olympiacos

Career highlights
- EuroLeague champion (2026); All-EuroCup Second Team (2023); Greek League champion (2026); Greek Super Cup winner (2026); ABA League champion (2025); ABA League Finals MVP (2025); Turkish Super League MVP (2023); All-Lega Serie A Team (2022); Lega Serie A rebounding leader (2022); Second-team All-Big East (2020)

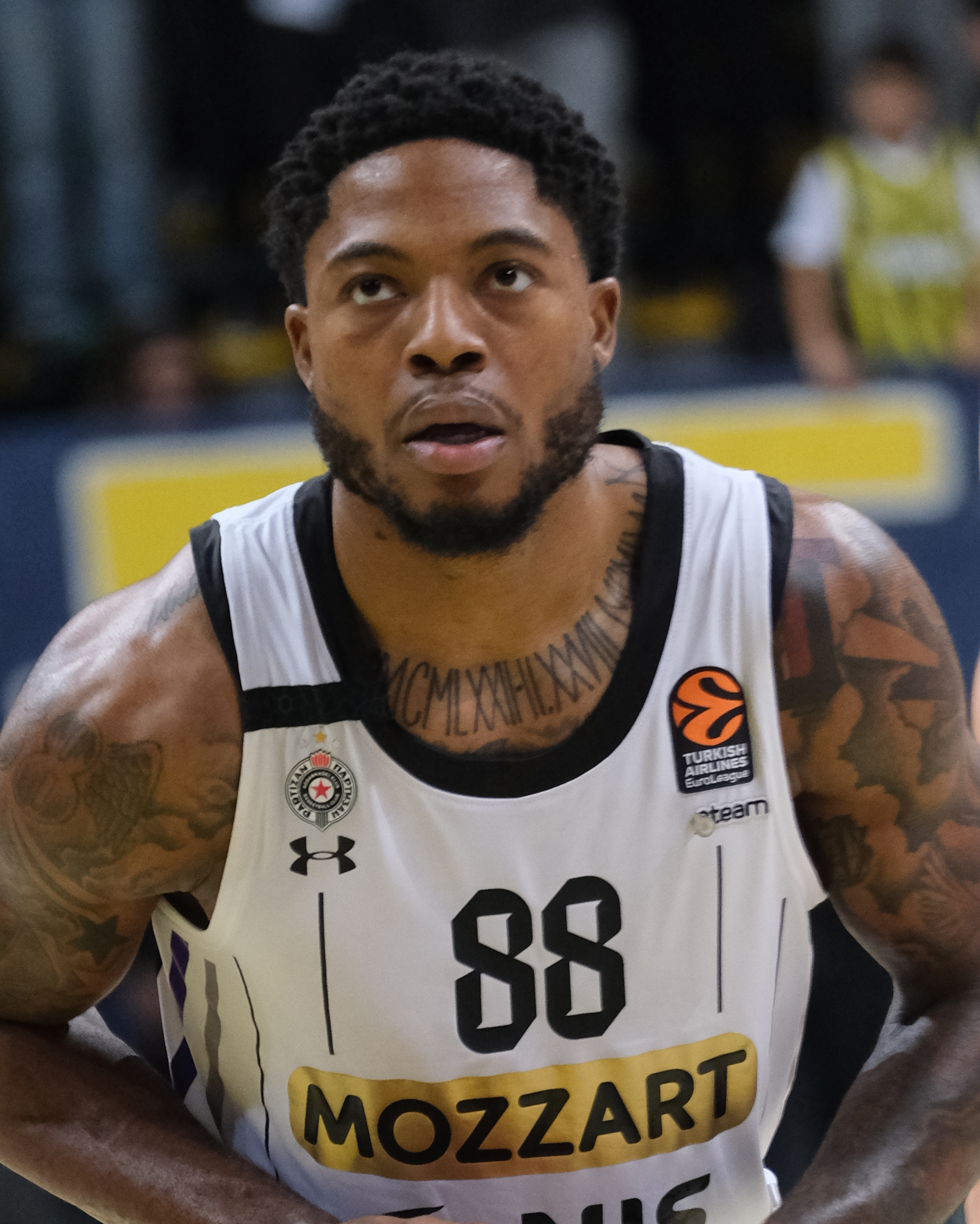
Jones with Partizan in 2024

Tyrique Daniel Jones (born May 3, 1997) is an American professional basketball player for Olympiacos of the Greek Basketball League (GBL) and the EuroLeague. He played college basketball for the Xavier Musketeers.

== Early life ==
Jones grew up playing football as a tight end and defensive end and idolized Dwight Freeney. However, while attending Bloomfield High School in Bloomfield, Connecticut, Freeney's alma mater, he began to focus on basketball instead. As a junior, he averaged 10.6 points, 8.4 rebounds and 3.1 blocks per game, leading his team to the Class S state semifinals and earning First Team All-State honors from the Hartford Courant. He played Amateur Athletic Union basketball for the New York Rens and Expressions Elite. For his senior season, Jones transferred to Vermont Academy in Saxtons River, Vermont, averaging 13.2 points and 7.6 rebounds per game. He led his team to the Class AA New England Preparatory School Athletic Council (NEPSAC) Finals and was named to the Class AA All-NEPSAC Second Team. Jones played a postgraduate season, averaging 19.8 points, 9.7 rebounds, 2.2 blocks, 1.5 steals and 1.7 assists per game. He led Vermont Academy to its first ever NEPSAC title and was a Class AA All-NEPSAC First Team selection.

Jones was considered a four-star recruit by ESPN and Rivals, and a three-star recruit by 247Sports. On June 29, 2015, he committed to play college basketball for Xavier over offers from Florida State, Cincinnati and Texas Tech, among other high major programs.

College recruiting
Name	Hometown	School	Height	Weight	Commit date
Tyrique Jones; PF	Bloomfield, CT	Vermont Academy (VT)	6 ft 7 in (2.01 m)	235 lb (107 kg)	Jun 29, 2015
Tyrique Jones; PF	Recruit ratings: Rivals: 247Sports: ESPN: (82)				
Overall recruit ranking: Rivals: 115 247Sports: 138 ESPN: 95
Note: In many cases, Scout, Rivals, 247Sports, On3, and ESPN may conflict in their listings of height and weight.; In these cases, the average was taken. ESPN grades are on a 100-point scale.; Sources: "Xavier 2016 Basketball Commitments". Rivals.; "2016 Xavier Musketeers Recruiting Class". ESPN.; "2016 Team Ranking". Rivals.

== College career ==
As a freshman, Jones started four games in the NCAA Tournament and helped Xavier reach the Elite Eight. He averaged 4.1 points and 3.2 rebounds per game. He struggled with leg soreness during his sophomore season, which he credited to not utilizing the training room enough, and he missed two games with a shoulder injury. Jones largely played behind Kerem Kanter and Sean O'Mara as a sophomore, averaging seven points and 4.5 rebounds per contest. He focused on losing weight by eating a healthy diet as well as outside shooting and weight lifting going into his junior season. Coach Chris Mack praised his attitude and demeanor, calling him one of his favorite players.

On November 10, 2018, Jones scored 19 points and had a career-high 20 rebounds in a 91–85 win over Evansville. He posted a career-high 22 points and had 11 rebounds in a 78–76 overtime loss to Texas in the second round of the NIT, but missed a layup to tie the game at the end. As a junior, Jones averaged 11.3 points and 7.7 rebounds per game. Following the season he declared for the 2019 NBA draft but ultimately returned to Xavier. On November 22, 2019, Jones posted 17 points with 11 rebounds in a 75–74 double overtime win over UConn and blocked a potential game-winning shot at the end of regulation. In his final collegiate game on March 12, 2020, he tied his career-high with 22 points in a 71–67 loss to DePaul. Jones averaged 14 points, 11 rebounds, 1.1 steals and one block per game as a senior and had 20 double-doubles, the fourth-most for Division I players. He was named to the Second Team All-Big East.

== Professional career ==
=== Early years ===
On September 21, 2020, Jones signed his first professional contract with Wonju DB Promy of the Korean Basketball League.

On December 31, 2020, he signed with Hapoel Tel Aviv of the Israeli Basketball Premier League. In 2020–21 he was third in the Israel Basketball Premier League in blocked shots per game (1.4), 6th in offensive rebounds (2.6), and fifth in two-point field goal percentage (67.2 per cent).

Jones joined the Phoenix Suns for the 2021 NBA Summer League. On August 21, 2021, he signed with Victoria Libertas Pesaro of the Lega Basket Serie A.

On July 23, 2022, Jones signed with Türk Telekom of the Basketbol Süper Ligi (BSL). On June 21, 2023, he mutually parted ways with the Turkish club.

=== Andaolu Efes (2023–2024) ===
On June 24, 2023, Jones signed a two-year contract with Turkish powerhouse Anadolu Efes, following his Türk Telekom coach Erdem Can.

=== Partizan (2024–2026) ===
On August 20, 2024, Jones signed with Partizan Mozzart Bet of the ABA League, Basketball League of Serbia (KLS) and the EuroLeague. In his debut season with Partizan, Jones averaged career-high 11.6 points and 6 rebounds over 32 EuroLeague games. During the 2024–25 season, Partizan managed to lift the record eighth ABA League championship, and the Serbian League championship, the first one after 11 seasons.

=== Olympiacos (2026–present) ===
On January 5, 2026, Jones signed with Olympiacos of the Greek Basketball League (GBL) and the EuroLeague. In March 2026, Jones was injured during the Greek League Derby. He left the game with 2:23 remaining after first falling to the floor and requesting a substitution. He was taken to the hospital for further tests on his calf.

== Unsportsmanlike conduct ==
At the beginning of the 2025–26 season, Tyrique Jones was reported to be not in optimal physical condition, as he frequently dealt with minor injuries. Due to a minor injury, he missed a game against ASVEL in the EuroLeague.

Although he was not included in the game roster, Jones was present at the arena and became involved in a verbal altercation with a referee following a disputed decision. Head coach Partizan Željko Obradović intervened and removed him from the situation.

Following Obradović’s departure from the Partizan bench in late November 2025, Jones reportedly became less popular among Partizan supporters. In the first game after Obradović’s exit, on 4 December against FC Bayern Munich (basketball) in the EuroLeague, he was booed by a section of the home crowd.

Three weeks later, during a game against Maccabi Tel Aviv B.C., Jones was involved in a verbal confrontation with Partizan fans. Following these events, speculation increased regarding his potential departure from the club.

On 13 June 2026, during the third quarter of Game 5 of the Greek Basket League Finals between Olympiacos and Panathinaikos, Jones was ejected after an on-court incident with Kendrick Nunn, during which he was penalized for unsportsmanlike conduct after grabbing Nunn around the neck.

Following the game, which Olympiacos won, an additional altercation reportedly occurred in the Panathinaikos locker room area, where tensions escalated further.

== Career statistics ==
Legend
GP	Games played	GS	Games started	MPG	Minutes per game
FG%	Field-goal percentage	3P%	3-point field-goal percentage	FT%	Free-throw percentage
RPG	Rebounds per game	APG	Assists per game	SPG	Steals per game
BPG	Blocks per game	PPG	Points per game	PIR	Performance index rating
**Bold**	Career high

=== EuroLeague ===
Year	Team	GP	GS	MPG	FG%	3P%	FT%	RPG	APG	SPG	BPG	PPG	PIR
2023–24	Anadolu Efes	**34**	8	17.5	**.634**	—	**.667**	4.3	**1.0**	.8	.4	7.2	9.5
2024–25	Partizan	32	**10**	**22.6**	.632	—	.664	**6.0**	**1.0**	**1.1**	**.7**	**11.6**	**16.0**
Career		66	18	20.0	.633	—	.665	5.1	1.0	.9	.5	9.3	12.7

=== EuroCup ===
Year	Team	GP	GS	MPG	FG%	3P%	FT%	RPG	APG	SPG	BPG	PPG	PIR
2022–23	Türk Telekom	20	19	27.3	.673	.000	.603	8.0	1.0	1.3	.9	12.7	19.0
Career		20	19	27.3	.673	.000	.603	8.0	1.0	1.3	.9	12.7	19.0

=== Domestic leagues ===
Year	Team	League	GP	MPG	FG%	3P%	FT%	RPG	APG	SPG	BPG	PPG
2020–21	(South Korea) Wonju DB Promy	KBL	24	14.0	.529	—	.577	6.6	.5	.8	.2	6.6
2020–21	(Israel) Hapoel Tel Aviv	Ligat HaAl	16	28.3	.669	—	.755	7.7	1.3	1.1	1.4	12.9
2021–22	(Italy) Victoria Libertas	LBA	33	29.5	.652	.000	.567	9.7	1.6	.8	.9	13.1
2022–23	(Turkey) Türk Telekom	TBSL	34	27.5	.707	.000	.617	8.7	1.9	1.1	1.1	14.0
2023–24	(Turkey) Anadolu Efes	TBSL	16	26.2	.589	—	.611	6.4	1.7	.4	.6	10.5
2024–25	(Serbia) Partizan	ABA	30	19.3	.689	—	.679	5.3	1.5	.6	.5	9.8

=== College ===
Year	Team	GP	GS	MPG	FG%	3P%	FT%	RPG	APG	SPG	BPG	PPG
2016–17	Xavier	**37**	13	11.0	.602	—	.488	3.1	.3	.2	.4	4.2
2017–18	Xavier	32	19	15.0	**.627**	—	.589	4.5	.5	.6	.6	7.0
2018–19	Xavier	34	31	24.8	.624	—	**.641**	7.7	.8	.8	.9	11.3
2019–20	Xavier	32	**32**	**28.2**	.557	—	.592	**11.0**	**1.5**	**1.0**	**1.1**	**14.0**
Career		135	95	19.5	.595	—	.596	6.5	.7	.6	.7	9.0

== Personal life ==
Jones' mother, Petronia "Winnie" Bailey, emigrated with her brother from Jamaica to Connecticut at age 11. His father, Lester, was born in The Bahamas to Jamaican parents. On May 1, 2002, when Jones was four years old, his father jumped into Connecticut River and died by drowning, following an encounter with the police.

Jones was nicknamed "Eighty-Eight" by his father because his birth weight was eight pounds and eight ounces. The number was tattooed on Jones' right bicep when he was 16 years old; it was his first tattoo. He has a tattoo of the number 32 on his right shoulder and upper arm to honor his father's high school basketball jersey number at Weaver High School.
