= 1978 Connecticut gubernatorial election =

- November 7, 1978
- Turnout: 66.8%
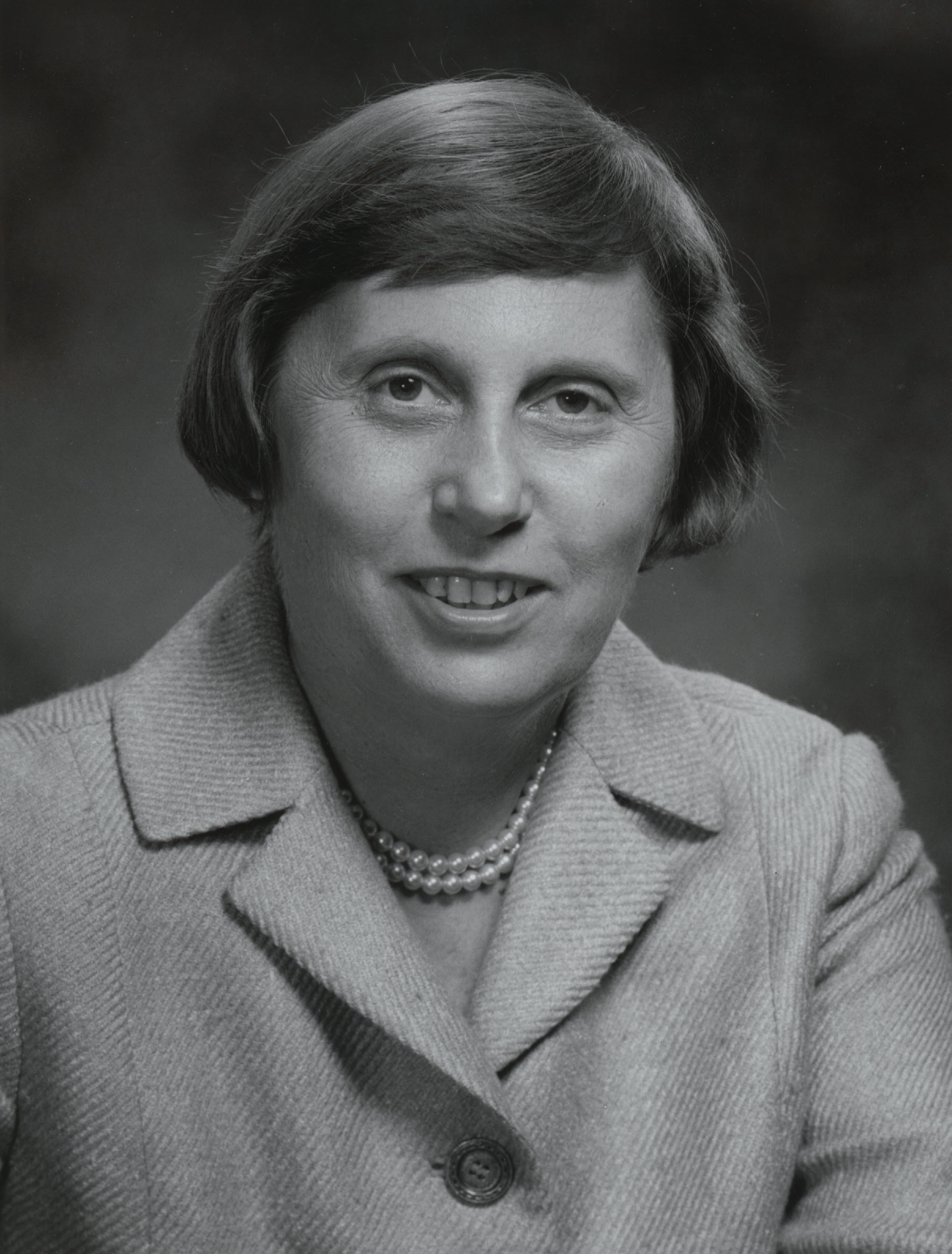

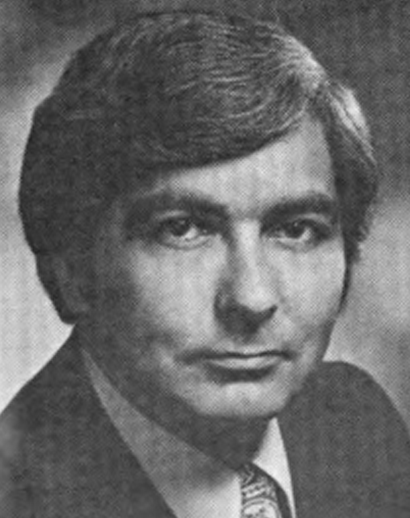
| Nominee | Ella Grasso | Ronald Sarasin |
| Party | Democratic | Republican |
| Running mate | Bill O'Neill | Lewis Rome |
| Popular vote | 613,109 | 422,316 |
| Percentage | 59.15% | 40.74% |
- Grasso: 50–60% 60–70% 70–80% Sarasin: 50–60% 60–70%
Governor before election
Ella Grasso
Democratic
Elected Governor
Ella Grasso
Democratic

The 1978 Connecticut gubernatorial election was held on Tuesday, November 7, 1978. Incumbent Democrat Ella Grasso and running mate Bill O'Neill defeated Republican candidate Ronald A. Sarasin and running mate Lewis Rome with 59.15% of the vote.

== Primary elections ==
Primary elections were held on September 12, 1978.

=== Democratic primary ===
==== Candidates ====
- Ella Grasso, incumbent governor
- Robert K. Killian, incumbent lieutenant governor

==== Results ====
Democratic primary results
| Party | Candidate | Votes | % |
|---|---|---|---|
| Democratic | Ella Grasso (incumbent) | 137,904 | 67.33 |
| Democratic | Robert K. Killian | 66,924 | 32.67 |
| Total votes | | 204,828 | 100.00 |

== General election ==
=== Candidates ===
- Ella Grasso, Democratic
- Ronald A. Sarasin, Republican

=== Results ===
1978 Connecticut gubernatorial election
| Party | Candidate | Votes | % | ±% |
|---|---|---|---|---|
| Democratic | Ella Grasso (incumbent) | 613,109 | 59.15% | |
| Republican | Ronald A. Sarasin | 422,316 | 40.74% | |
| Majority | | 190,793 | | |
| Turnout | | 1,036,608 | | |
| Democratic hold | | Swing | | |
