= Bloomfield High School (Connecticut) =

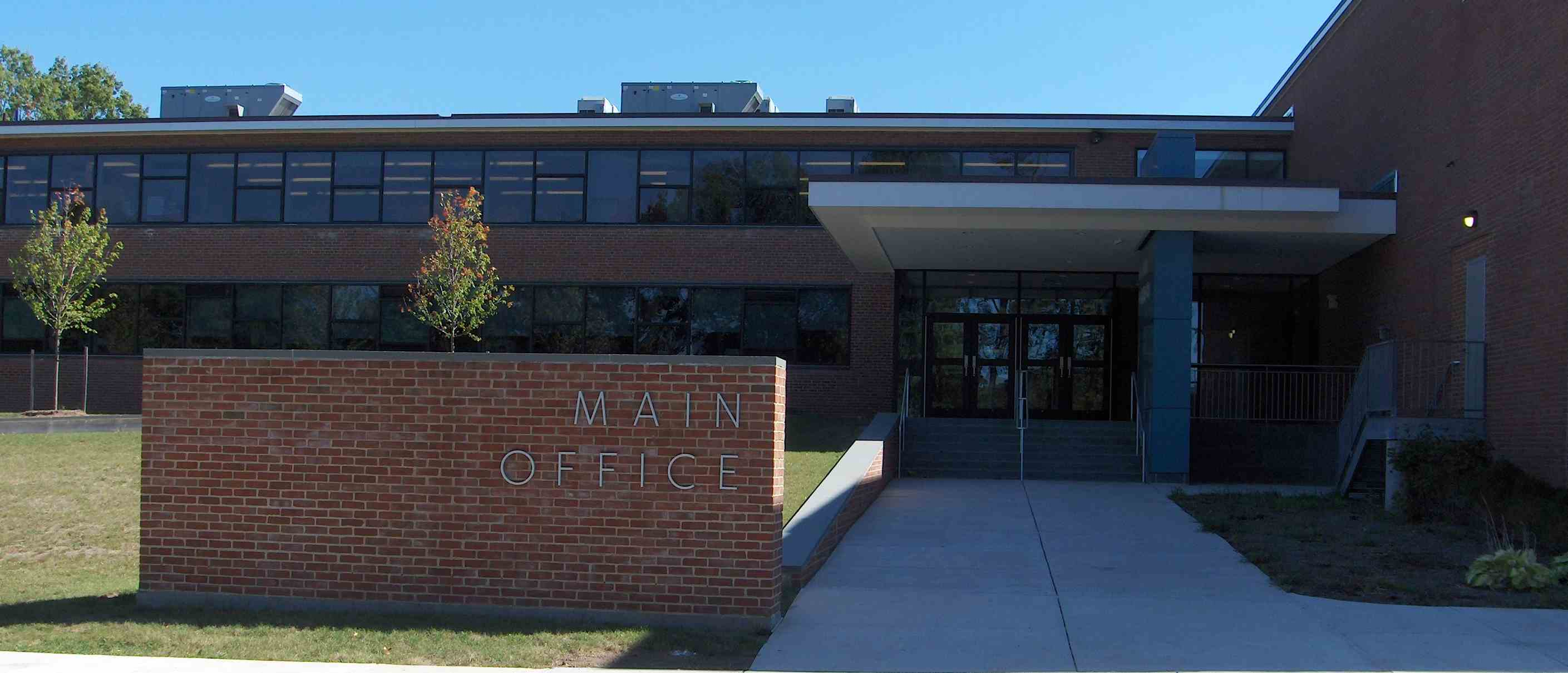

Location
- 5 Huckleberry Lane; Bloomfield, Hartford County, Connecticut 06002; United States
- Coordinates: 41°49′41″N 72°43′34″W

Information
- School type: Public
- Motto: Knowledge is Power
- School district: Bloomfield School District
- Superintendent: Tracy Youngberg
- CEEB code: 070030
- Principal: Jesse White
- Faculty: 50.40 (FTE)
- Grades: 9-12
- Enrollment: 509 (2023–2024)
- Student to teacher ratio: 10.10
- Colors: Blue and orange
- Slogan: Raising the Bar is Taking us Far.
- Team name: Warhawks
- Website: bhs.bloomfieldschools.org

Bloomfield High School is the sole public high school serving the town of Bloomfield, Connecticut, United States.

== Overview ==
Bloomfield High School has been a four-year high school since 1985, changing from a three-year high school as the school age population and public school attendance declined. The campus consists of the Bloomfield High School main building and the Harris Agricultural Science Center.

== Athletics ==
=== CIAC state championships ===
Team	Year
Girls' outdoor track	1988, 1989, 1990, 1991, 1992, 1993, 1994, 1995, 2001, 2005, 2006, 2008, 2009, 2010, 2011, 2012, 2013, 2014, 2015, 2016, 2017, 2018, 2019, 2022, 2023
Girls' indoor track	1989, 1991, 1992, 1993, 1995, 2001, 2006, 2010, 2011, 2012, 2013, 2014, 2015, 2016, 2017, 2018, 2019, 2020, 2022, 2023, 2024, 2025
Boys' outdoor track	1992, 2000, 2007, 2008, 2009, 2010, 2011, 2012, 2013, 2014, 2015, 2016, 2017, 2019, 2022, 2023
Football	1982, 1997, 1998, 1999, 2000, 2001, 2003, 2015, 2018, 2023
Boys' indoor track	2011, 2013, 2014, 2015, 2016, 2019, 2020, 2024, 2025
Boys' basketball	1938, 1946, 1961, 2002, 2022
Boys' soccer	1950, 2012
Girls' cross country	1986
Girls' basketball	2008

== Notable alumni ==
- Dwight Anderson (class of 2000) - football player for the Saskatchewan Roughriders
- Marcus Cooper (Class of 2008) - cornerback for the Chicago Bears
- Dwight Freeney (class of 1998) - football player (Super Bowl XLI-winning Indianapolis Colts)
- Arthur Ganson (class of 1973) - sculptor
- Jimmy Greene (class of 1993) - Grammy Award-nominated jazz alto saxophonist
- Jessica Hecht (class of 1982) - actress
- Tyrique Jones (transferred) - basketball player for Hapoel Tel Aviv in the Israeli Basketball Premier League
- Jay Karas (class of 1990) - film and television director and producer
- Matt Lawrence (class of 2003) - football player for the Baltimore Ravens
- Andrew Pinnock (class of 1999) - former NFL football player
- Lewis Rome (class of 1950) - Bloomfield mayor and Connecticut state senator
- Anika Noni Rose (class of 1990) - Tony Award-winning singer-actress
- Nykesha Sales (class of 1994) - professional women's basketball player
- Kory Sheets (class of 2004) - running back for the Oakland Raiders
- Julian Stanford (class of 2008) - football player for the Carolina Panthers
- Doug Wimbish - bass player for Living Colour
