= William R. Ratchford =

American politician (1934–2011)

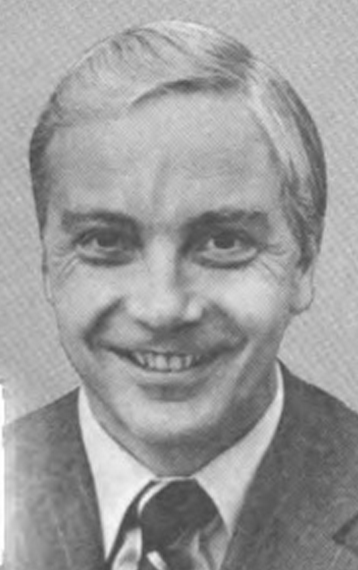

Member of the U.S. House of Representatives from Connecticut's 5th district
- In office January 3, 1979 – January 3, 1985
- Preceded by: Ronald A. Sarasin
- Succeeded by: John G. Rowland

Speaker of the Connecticut House of Representatives
- In office 1969-1972

Member of the Connecticut House of Representatives
- In office 1962-1974

Personal details
- Born: William Richard Ratchford; May 24, 1934 Danbury, Connecticut, U.S.
- Died: January 2, 2011 (aged 76) Arlington, Virginia, U.S.
- Party: Democratic
- Spouse: Barbara Ratchford
- Education: University of Connecticut

William Richard Ratchford (May 24, 1934 – January 2, 2011) was an American politician from Connecticut. He served six terms in the Connecticut House of Representatives, including two as speaker, and three terms in the United States House of Representatives. He was a member of the Democratic Party.

== Early life ==
He was born in Danbury, Connecticut. In 1952, Ratchford graduated from Danbury High School in Danbury, Connecticut. In 1956, he received a B.A. from the University of Connecticut, Storrs, where he was a member of Chi Phi fraternity. In 1959, he graduated with his J.D. from Georgetown Law School, Washington, D.C. He served in the Connecticut National Guard from 1959 to 1965. Ratchford was admitted to the Connecticut bar in 1959 and commenced practice in Danbury, in 1960.

== Political career ==
He was elected to the Connecticut House of Representatives in 1962. In 1969, he became the speaker a post that he held until 1972. In 1974, he ran for Congress from the 5th congressional district, but lost to Ronald A. Sarasin.

After his defeat, he served as chairman of the Governor's Blue Ribbon Committee on Nursing Homes from 1975 to 1976, and as Commissioner on Aging from 1977 to 1978. He served as a delegate to the Connecticut State Democratic conventions from 1960 to 1974, and as a delegate to the Democratic National Conventions in 1972 and 1984.

=== Congress ===
In 1978, he made a second run for Congress for the seat that Sarasin vacated to run for governor. He defeated State Senator George Guidera by 8,273 votes. He won re-election in 1980 and 1982. In 1984, he was defeated by future Connecticut Governor John G. Rowland as Ronald Reagan’s landslide re-election boosted Republicans.

== Congress ==
After leaving Congress, he taught at his alma mater, Georgetown University, and worked as a lobbyist. He later was the Associate Administrator in the Office of Congressional and Intergovernmental Affairs at the U.S. General Services Administration from 1993 to 2001.

== Death ==
He died on January 2, 2011, aged 76, from complications of Parkinson's disease. He had been a long-time resident of Arlington, Virginia.

U.S. House of Representatives
Preceded by Ronald A. Sarasin	Member of the U.S. House of Representatives from Connecticut's 5th congressional district 1979-1985	Succeeded by John G. Rowland
