= Mary Fahey =

American politician (1919–2009)

Member of the Connecticut House of Representatives from Torrington
- In office 1957–1959 Serving with Gennaro Piscitelli
- Preceded by: John A. Miscikoski; Wallace Fabro
- Succeeded by: John A. Miscikoski; Zena Temkin

Personal details
- Born: Mary Quinn; October 4, 1919 Torrington, Connecticut, U.S.
- Died: August 3, 2009 (aged 89)
- Party: Republican
- Spouse: John B. Fahey (m. 1939; died 1995)
- Children: 6

Mary Q. Fahey (October 4, 1919 – September 3, 2009) was an American politician who served in the Connecticut House of Representatives from 1957 to 1959, representing the city of Torrington as a Republican.

== Personal life ==
Mary Quinn was born on October 4, 1919, at the Charlotte Hungerford Hospital in Torrington, Connecticut. She graduated from Torrington High School in 1937. In 1939, she married John B. Fahey. They had six children together. John died in 1995.

== Career ==
A Republican, Fahey was elected to the Connecticut House of Representatives in 1956, and she served one term representing the city of Torrington alongside fellow Republican Gennaro Piscitelli. She did not run for reelection.

In 1958, Fahey ran for secretary of the state of Connecticut. She was defeated by Democratic candidate Ella Grasso.

Fahey was elected registrar of voters in Litchfield in 2004, and she served until 2007.

== Death ==
Fahey died on September 3, 2009, at age 89.
