= Russell L. Post Jr. =

American politician (1937–2015)

Russell Lee "Rusty" Post Jr. (January 7, 1937 – November 14, 2015) was an American politician.

Post Jr. was born in New York City on January 7, 1937, to parents Emily Lord and Russell Lee Post Sr. After graduating from Groton, Yale College, and Yale Law School, he moved to Connecticut, settling in Canton, where he remained for 23 years. Post began practicing law at Shipman and Goodwin Law Firm in 1961, and was named a partner. After a decade, Post cofounded his own firm, with Laurence Pratt. As he practiced law, Post also served on the board of the Westledge School in Simsbury.

Post Jr. had a five-term tenure on the Connecticut General Assembly. He sat on the Connecticut House of Representatives from 1973 to 1979, as a legislator representing the 62nd House district. Russell than won election to the Connecticut Senate from the 8th Senate district, serving until 1983. He did not run for reelection to the state senate, and instead launched a campaign committee to consider a bid for the 1982 Connecticut gubernatorial election. The Republican Party ticket was eventually formed by Post's immediate predecessor as senator, Lewis Rome, and a legislative colleague of Post's, Gerald Labriola. In 1984, Post visited the Soviet Union as part of the Volga River Peace Cruise and was a drafter of the Volga Declaration.

In the 1990s, Post moved to Orcas Island, where he became a real estate agent. He was also a member of the Orcas Island Chamber of Commerce. On, November 14, 2015, Post died of complications of Alzheimer's disease, aged 78, on Orcas Island.
