= 1994 United States Senate election in Connecticut =

- November 8, 1994
- Turnout: 65.1%
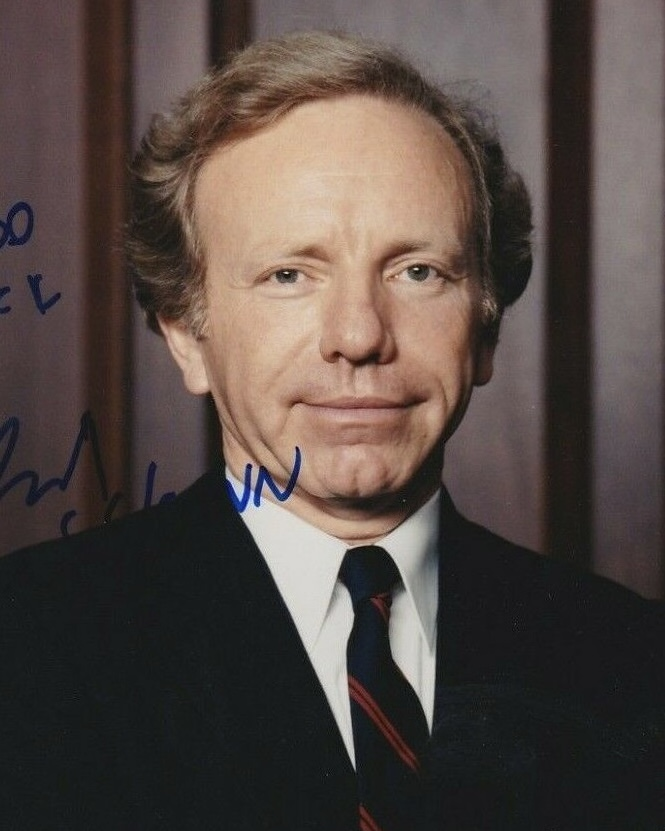

Nominee	Joe Lieberman	Jerry Labriola
Party	Democratic	Republican
Alliance	A Connecticut Party
Popular vote	723,842	334,833
Percentage	67.04%	31.01%
- Lieberman: 40–50% 50–60% 60–70% 70–80% 80–90% Labriola: 40–50% 50–60%
U.S. senator before election
Joe Lieberman
Democratic
Elected U.S. Senator
Joe Lieberman
Democratic

The 1994 United States Senate election in Connecticut was held November 8, 1994. Incumbent Democratic U.S. Senator Joe Lieberman won re-election to a second term.

== Republican primary ==
=== Candidates ===
- Jerry Labriola, State Senator and professor at the University of Connecticut
- Joe Bentivegna

=== Results ===
1994 Republican primary results
Party	Candidate	Votes	%
Republican	Jerry Labriola	69,972	66.83%
Republican	Joe Bentivegna	34,733	33.17%
Total votes		104,705	100.0%

== General election ==
=== Candidates ===
- Joe Lieberman (D), incumbent U.S. Senator
- Jerry Labriola (R), State Senator and professor at the University of Connecticut

=== Results ===
General election results
Party	Candidate	Votes	%
Democratic	Joe Lieberman	443,793	41.10%
A Connecticut Party (1990)	Joe Lieberman	280,049	25.94%
Total	Joe Lieberman (incumbent)	723,842	67.04%
Republican	Jerry Labriola	334,833	31.01%
Concerned Citizens	Gary R. Garneau	20,988	1.93%
Write-in		103	0.01%
Total votes		1,079,766	100.0%
Democratic hold			

=== By congressional district ===
Lieberman won all six congressional district, including three that elected Republicans.

District	Lieberman	Labriola	Representative
1st	71%	27%	Barbara Kennelly
2nd	73%	24%	Sam Gejdenson
3rd	71%	27%	Rosa DeLauro
4th	62%	37%	Chris Shays
5th	60%	39%	Gary Franks
6th	65%	33%	Nancy Johnson

== See also ==
- 1994 United States Senate elections
