= Julian Stanford =

American football player (born 1990)

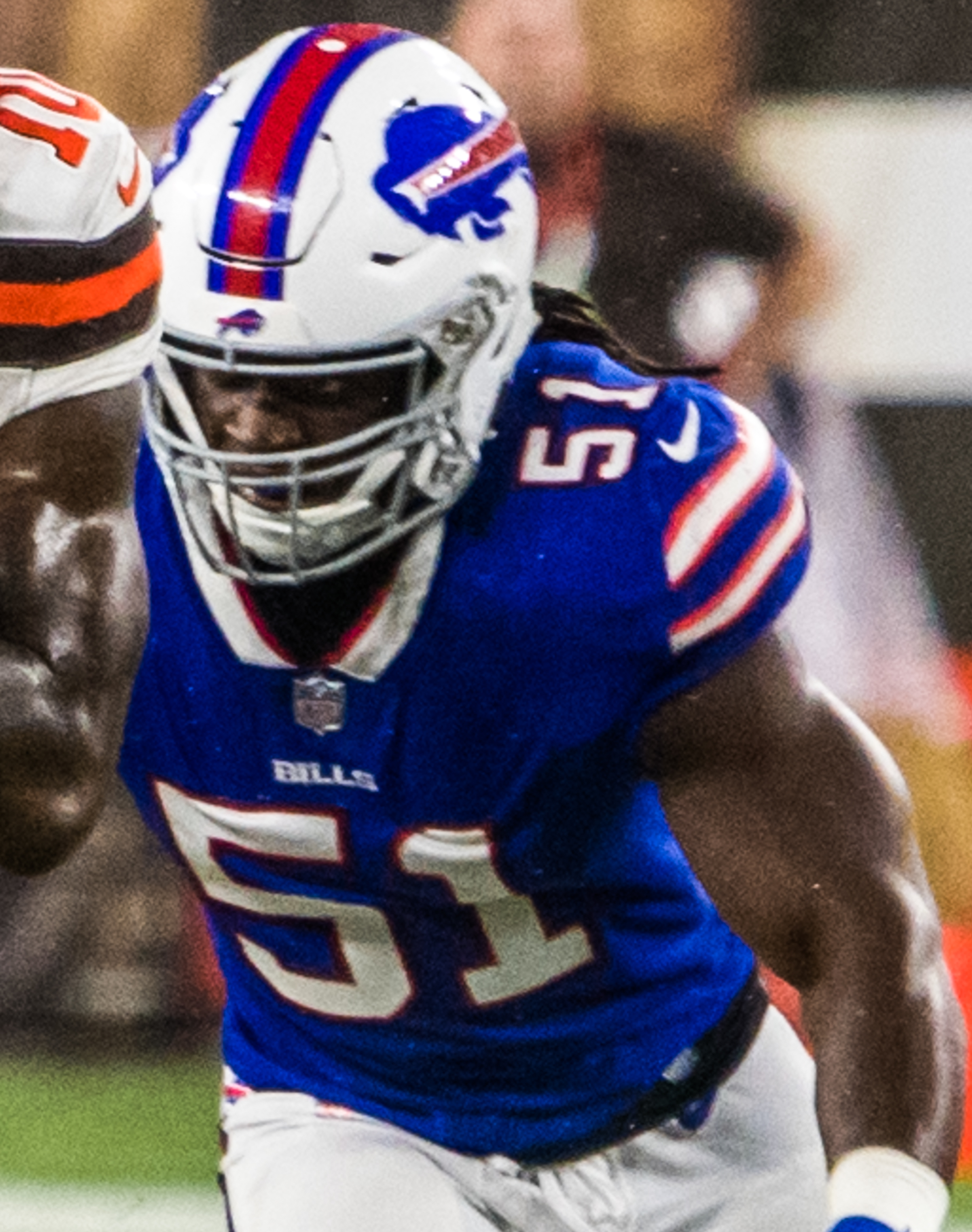
- Stanford with the Buffalo Bills in 2018

No. 57, 49, 51, 50
- Position: Linebacker

Personal information
- Born: September 2, 1990 (age 36); Bloomfield, Connecticut, U.S.
- Listed height: 6 ft 1 in (1.85 m)
- Listed weight: 230 lb (104 kg)

Career information
- High school: Bloomfield
- College: Wagner
- NFL draft: 2012: undrafted

Career history
- Jacksonville Jaguars (2012); Detroit Lions (2013–2014); Tampa Bay Buccaneers (2015)*; New York Jets (2015–2017); Buffalo Bills (2018–2019); Carolina Panthers (2020–2022); Baltimore Ravens (2022); Detroit Lions (2022)*
- * Offseason or practice squad member only

Awards and highlights
- First-team All-NEC (2011)

Career NFL statistics
- Total tackles: 117
- Sacks: 1
- Forced fumbles: 2
- Fumble recoveries: 2
- Pass deflections: 1
- Stats at Pro Football Reference

Julian Stanford (born September 2, 1990) is an American former professional football player who was a linebacker in the National Football League (NFL). He played college football for the Wagner Seahawks and was signed by the Jacksonville Jaguars as an undrafted free agent in 2012. He also played for the Detroit Lions, New York Jets, Buffalo Bills, Carolina Panthers, and Baltimore Ravens.

== Professional career ==
=== Jacksonville Jaguars ===
Stanford signed with the Jacksonville Jaguars following the 2012 NFL draft as a rookie free agent. He was released on August 30, 2013.

=== Detroit Lions (first stint) ===
On December 3, 2013, Stanford signed with the Detroit Lions. He was cut by the Lions on September 6, 2015.

=== Tampa Bay Buccaneers ===
After working out for the team Stanford signed to the Buccaneers practice squad on September 16, 2015. On September 22, 2015, he was released from practice squad. On October 28, 2015, he was re-signed to the practice squad. On November 3, 2015, he was waived.

=== New York Jets ===
On December 1, 2015, Stanford was signed to the Jets' practice squad and was re-signed on January 5, 2016. He was released on September 26, 2016, and re-signed to the practice squad the next day. He was promoted back to the active roster on October 22, 2016. He was waived by the Jets on December 7, 2016, and placed on injured reserve.

On April 14, 2017, Stanford was released by the Jets but was re-signed three days later.

=== Buffalo Bills ===
On March 14, 2018, Stanford signed with the Buffalo Bills.

=== Carolina Panthers ===
After becoming a free agent in March 2020, Stanford visited the Houston Texans on August 16, and had a tryout with the Carolina Panthers on August 19. On August 22, 2020, Stanford was signed by the Panthers.

On May 18, 2021, Stanford re-signed with Carolina, and was a core special teamer for the team in 2021. He re-signed again with the Panthers on March 9, 2022. He was placed on injured reserve on August 30, 2022. He was released on October 11.

=== Baltimore Ravens ===
Stanford signed to the Baltimore Ravens' practice squad on October 18, 2022. He was promoted to the active roster on November 26 and moved back to the practice squad two days later. He was released on December 19.

=== Detroit Lions (second stint) ===
On January 3, 2023, Stanford was signed to the Lions practice squad.
