= 1970 Connecticut Attorney General election =

- November 3, 1970

Nominee	Robert K. Killian	Donald T. Dorsey
Party	Democratic	Republican
Popular vote	529,898	528,135
Percentage	50.1%	49.9%
- Killian: 50–60% 60–70% 70–80% Dorsey: 50–60% 60–70% 70–80%
Attorney General before election
Robert K. Killian
Democratic
Elected Attorney General
Robert K. Killian
Democratic

The 1970 Connecticut Attorney General election took place on November 3, 1970, to elect the Attorney General of Connecticut. Incumbent Democratic Attorney General Robert K. Killian was appointed to the office by Governor John N. Dempsey in 1967 to fill the vacancy left by Harold M. Mulvey, who resigned a year into his term to accept an appointment to the Connecticut Superior Court.

Killian was elected to a full term in his own right, defeating Republican nominee Donald T. Dorsey by 1,763 votes, a margin of just 0.17%. As of 2026, this was the last time the Attorney General of Connecticut was elected by less than a 5-point margin.

== Democratic primary ==
=== Candidates ===
==== Nominee ====
- Robert K. Killian, incumbent attorney general (1967–1975)

== Republican primary ==
=== Candidates ===
==== Nominee ====
- Donald T. Dorsey, candidate for state representative from the 78th district in 1966

== General election ==
=== Results ===
1970 Connecticut Attorney General election
Party	Candidate	Votes	%	±%
Democratic	Robert K. Killian (incumbent)	529,898	50.08%	
Republican	Donald T. Dorsey	528,135	49.91%	
Write-in	Write-ins	36	0.00%	N/A
Total votes		1,058,069	100.0%	
Democratic hold				

== See also ==
- Connecticut Attorney General
