= 1978 Connecticut Attorney General election =

- November 7, 1978
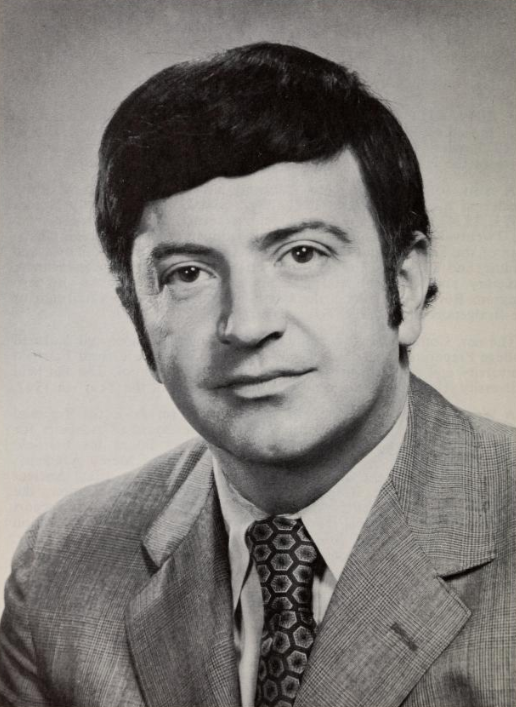

Nominee	Carl R. Ajello	Peter C. Dorsey
Party	Democratic	Republican
Popular vote	551,762	439,312
Percentage	55.7%	44.3%
- Ajello: 50–60% 60–70% 70–80% Dorsey: 50–60% 60–70% 70–80%
Attorney General before election
Carl R. Ajello
Democratic
Elected Attorney General
Carl R. Ajello
Democratic

The 1978 Connecticut Attorney General election took place on November 7, 1978, to elect the Attorney General of Connecticut. Incumbent Democratic Attorney General Carl R. Ajello won re-election to a second term, defeating Republican nominee Peter C. Dorsey.

== Democratic primary ==
=== Candidates ===
==== Nominee ====
- Carl R. Ajello, incumbent attorney general (1975–1983)

== Republican primary ==
=== Candidates ===
==== Nominee ====
- Peter C. Dorsey, United States Attorney for the District of Connecticut (1974–1977)

== General election ==
=== Results ===
1978 Connecticut Attorney General election
Party	Candidate	Votes	%	±%
Democratic	Carl R. Ajello (incumbent)	551,762	55.67%	
Republican	Peter C. Dorsey	439,312	44.32%	
Write-in	Write-ins	57	0.01%	N/A
Total votes		991,134	100.0%	
Democratic hold				

== See also ==
- Connecticut Attorney General
