= John Moran Bailey =

American politician (1904–1975)

John Bailey
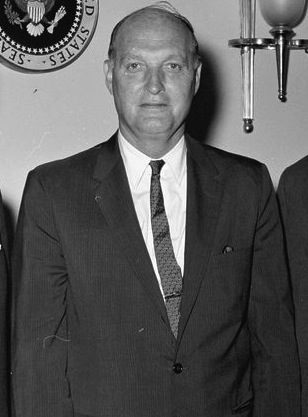
- Bailey in 1961

Chair of the Democratic National Committee
- In office January 21, 1961 – August 30, 1968
- Preceded by: Henry M. Jackson
- Succeeded by: Larry O'Brien

Chairman of the Democratic Party of Connecticut
- In office September 23, 1946 – April 10, 1975
- Preceded by: John A. McGuire
- Succeeded by: William A. O'Neill

Personal details
- Born: John Moran Bailey; November 23, 1904 Hartford, Connecticut, U.S.
- Died: April 10, 1975 (aged 70) Hartford, Connecticut, U.S.
- Party: Democratic
- Children: Barbara
- Education: Catholic University (BA); Harvard University (LLB)

John Moran Bailey (November 23, 1904 – April 10, 1975) was an American politician who played a major role in promoting the New Deal coalition of the Democratic Party and its liberal policy positions.

Bailey dominated Connecticut Democratic politics as a party chairman, from 1946 to his death in 1975. He typically had a decisive voice in selecting the party's candidates for top offices and in coordinating Democrats in the state legislature. He was even more powerful as the chairman of the Democratic National Committee from 1961 until 1968 and was one of the main behind-the-scenes backers of John F. Kennedy.

An Irish Catholic, Bailey was educated at The Catholic University of America and Harvard Law School.

== State politics ==
John M Bailey, was one of the proud founders of the Young Democrats of America, serving as a national officer in 1935 from Connecticut, an organization which was crafted from the Presidential Candidacy of Franklin Delano Roosevelt in 1933.

Bailey was the dominant figure in Connecticut politics between 1950 and his death in 1975. From his office in Hartford two blocks from the State Capitol, he coordinated and controlled statewide election campaigns and the activities of the Connecticut General Assembly.

Bailey's tenure as head of the Connecticut Democratic party was credited with turning the state from one politically dominated by WASP Yankee Republicans to one dominated by Democratic candidates of Roman Catholic and Jewish background, such as Abraham Ribicoff, Thomas Dodd, John Dempsey, and Ella T. Grasso.

His Republican rival was Meade Alcorn, who also happened to serve as national chairman of his party.

Prior to his statewide activities, Bailey had served in local roles in his home city of Hartford.

== Federal politics ==
Bailey's term as DNC chairman was a roller-coaster ride, as he oversaw the party's moment of greatest political strength (following the 1964 electoral landslide) and greatest political weakness (the 1968 Democratic National Convention in Chicago). He was also the first Chairman to oversee the loss of the South.

Following the assassination of John F. Kennedy in 1963, Bailey and the new president, Lyndon B. Johnson, oversaw the greatest electoral landslide in United States history, with the party winning 486 electoral votes as well as supermajorities in both houses of the US Congress. The 1966 elections to the House of Representatives and the Senate saw Republican gains but Democrats retaining control of both houses of Congress as well as the majority of governorships.

In 1968, the Republican Party again nominated Richard Nixon as the presidential nominee and quickly rallied around him. However, the Democrats were more divided, particularly over the controversial Vietnam War. Senator Eugene McCarthy, Senator Robert F. Kennedy, Senator George McGovern, Vice President Hubert Humphrey were only some of those who sought the nomination, with Bailey co-presiding over the 1968 Democratic National Convention in Chicago. In the end, Nixon was elected, but the Democrats retained their majority in both houses of Congress.

== Death ==
Bailey died in 1975 and was interred at Cedar Hill Cemetery in Hartford, Connecticut.

The John M. Bailey Papers have been donated to the University of Connecticut and are available for research.

== Legacy ==
Connecticut Democrats honor Bailey each year with their Jefferson-Jackson-Bailey Dinner. An admiring biography of Bailey was written by Senator Joe Lieberman in 1981.

The Bailey and Kennelly families have a prominent presence in the Connecticut Democratic Party and in the city of Hartford. In Hartford, they're one of the last prominent Irish families in a city that is now dominated by African Americans and Puerto Ricans.

Bailey's daughter, Barbara Kennelly served in the U.S. Congress representing Connecticut's first congressional district. She later left the House to run for governor in a race she lost to the incumbent, John G. Rowland.

Another Bailey daughter, Judith Bailey Perkins, is a professor at Saint Joseph College in West Hartford.

Bailey's son, also named John Bailey, was a career prosecutor in Connecticut, first serving as Hartford State's Attorney, then as Chief State's Attorney.

Many of Bailey's grandsons went on to have politically oriented careers: John Moran Bailey II is currently the Director of Government and Community Affairs for a nonprofit, SINA Inc., Justin Kronholm, is the former executive director of the Connecticut Democratic State Central Committee, and John B. Kennelly was previously elected to Hartford Court of Common Council and was an early rival to Hartford mayor Eddie Perez.

Party political offices
Preceded by Henry M. Jackson	Chair of the Democratic National Committee; 1961–1968	Succeeded by Larry O'Brien
