= WAPJ =

- Torrington, Connecticut; United States
- Frequency: 89.9 MHz

Programming
- Format: Free-form radio
- Affiliations: Pacifica Radio Network

Ownership
- Owner: Torrington Community Radio Foundation, Inc.

History
- First air date: March 17, 1997

Technical information
- Licensing authority: FCC
- Facility ID: 66472
- Class: A
- ERP: 40 watts
- HAAT: 84.0 meters
- Transmitter coordinates: 41°48′9″N 73°9′54.3″W
- Translator: (105.1 MHz) W285AP (Torrington)

Links
- Public license information: Public file; LMS
- Website: wapj.org

WAPJ (89.9 MHz) is a non-commercial FM radio station in Torrington, Connecticut, operated by the Torrington Community Radio Foundation, Inc. The station first went on the air in 1997, and offers an eclectic mix of music and spoken word programming produced by volunteers and targeted to the Torrington area.

The station's programming includes fine Bluegrass, Country and Western, classic Rock, Reggae, Jazz and Oldies music. Blues and Doo Wop are also played. In addition, the station offers extensive coverage of local sports including Torrington High School games. WAPJ's schedule also includes talk shows with topics ranging from sports and politics to health and homeopathy.

== History ==
WAPJ was founded by Isadore and Zena Temkin through their nonprofit, the I.B. and Zena H. Temkin Foundation. Originally licensed to the Litchfield County Commission for Higher Education, it came on the air in May 1997 with both the studio and antenna located on the UCONN Torrington campus. The station's antenna was mounted on a 300' tower formerly owned by SNET. The station operated with 100 watts ERP from this location but had some coverage problems due to high terrain to the west and north of the site. To eliminate these problems the antenna was moved to Highland Avenue in Torrington, Connecticut in 2000. Even though the FCC required that the power be reduced to 40 watts, the greatly increased height of the antenna resulted in a significant improvement in coverage. In 2001 the license was transferred to the Nutmeg Ballet and the studios were moved to the basement of the newly renovated Nutmeg Ballet building on Main Street in Torrington, Connecticut The additional space at this location allowed for the construction of a 2nd studio for training and production. In 2004 the license was transferred to the current licensee, the I.B. and Zena H. Temkin Foundation, and the studios were moved to 42 Water Street in Torrington. This location offered approximately 2,000 square feet (190 m^{2}) of space and included an air studio, a production studio, a performance area, and extensive office space. In 2005 the station was granted a license for a translator on 105.1 MHz with 20 watts to provide additional signal building-penetration downtown Torrington.

In August 2011, Iz Temkin, station founder and president of the Temkin Foundation, licensee of WAPJ, donated the station to the newly formed Torrington Community Radio Foundation, Inc, John Ramsey, president. On November 30, 2011, the Federal Communications Commission approved the transfer of the license to the new foundation. On December 15, 2011, renovations starting on the station's studios. During this time live programming was suspended and holiday music was broadcast 24 hours a day. Live programming resumed in January 2012 with The Miscellaneous Morning Show hosted by Barrie, Holly, and Karen. Other shows feature Reggae, Rock, Jazz, and Country as well as spoken word and sports. In 2018 an old-time-radio style show began to be produced at WAPJ called Nutmeg Junction and the program is shared with other non-commercial community radio stations.

== Translator ==
Call sign	Frequency	City of license	FID	ERP (W)	HAAT	Class	FCC info
W285AP	(105.1 MHz) FM	Torrington, Connecticut	158594	100	17 m (56 ft)	D	LMS
