= Elizabeth Zdunczyk =

American politician (1910–1986)

- Zdunczyk c. 1954

Member of the Connecticut House of Representatives from Southington
- In office 1951–1955 Serving with Louis J. Fiondella (1951–1953); Edgar F. Curtiss (1953–1955)
- Preceded by: Louis J. Fiondella; Mary Flynn
- Succeeded by: Raymond A. Thayer; Juanine S. DePaolo

Personal details
- Born: Elizabeth Klemba; September 16, 1910 Torrington, Connecticut, U.S.
- Died: December 8, 1986 (aged 76)
- Party: Democratic
- Spouse: Joseph A. Zdunczyk (m. 1934)
- Children: 2

Elizabeth Zdunczyk (September 16, 1910 – December 8, 1986) was an American politician who served in the Connecticut House of Representatives from 1951 to 1955, representing the town of Southington as a Democrat.

== Personal life ==
Elizabeth Klemba was born on September 16, 1910, in Torrington, Connecticut, to John and Rose Klemba. She was one of three daughters. She married Joseph A. Zdunczyk in 1934, and they had two children. Her parents were born in Poland, and she was active in the Polish National Alliance, which presented her with its national merit award in 1982.

== Political career ==
Zdunczyk was first elected to the Connecticut House of Representatives in 1950, and she served two terms representing the town of Southington as a Democrat. She served her first term alongside Louis J. Fiondella and the second alongside Edgar F. Curtiss.

Zdunczyk was the Democratic nominee for secretary of the state of Connecticut in 1954. She was defeated by Republican candidate Mildred P. Allen.

== Death ==
Zdunczyk died on December 8, 1986, at age 76.
