= Howard T. Owens Jr. =

American politician, judge and lawyer (1934–2018)

Howard Thomas Owens, Jr.

Member of the Connecticut Senate from the 22nd district
- In office January 8, 1975 – January 9, 1985
- Preceded by: Richard S. Scalo
- Succeeded by: Angelina "Lee" Scarpetti
- In office January 7, 1987 – January 4, 1989
- Preceded by: Angelina "Lee" Scarpetti
- Succeeded by: Angelina "Lee" Scarpetti

Personal details
- Born: July 20, 1934 Bridgeport, Connecticut, U.S.
- Died: April 3, 2018 (aged 83) Bridgeport, Connecticut, U.S.
- Resting place: Saint Michael's Cemetery, Stratford, Connecticut, U.S.
- Party: Democratic
- Spouse: Ann Veronica Ehrsam (m. 1965)
- Education: College of the Holy Cross (BA); Vanderbilt University (LLB)

Howard Thomas Owens Jr. (July 20, 1934 – April 3, 2018) was an American politician, lawyer and judge.

== Early life and education ==
Owens was born in Bridgeport, Connecticut, the eldest of three children of Howard T. Owens, Sr., and Clarisse Baillargeon Owens. His father was from Bridgeport and his mother was from Saint-Urbain, Quebec, Canada.

Owens graduated from the College of the Holy Cross in Worcester, Massachusetts, with a Bachelor of Arts in 1956 and earned his Bachelor of Laws from the Vanderbilt University School of Law in 1959. He served in the U.S. Army Reserve from 1958–64, was an Assistant U.S. Attorney for the District of Connecticut from 1964–68, and was a partner in Owens and Schine, later Owens, Schine, Nicola and Donahue, the law firm founded by his father.

== Career ==
Howard Thomas Owens Jr. represented Bridgeport and Trumbull in the Connecticut State Senate from the old 22nd District, serving for six terms between 1975 and 1989. While in the State Senate, he served as Assistant Majority Leader, and as Chairman of both the Judiciary and Transportation Committees. During his Senate terms, he sponsored legislation establishing the Connecticut Appellate Court; was responsible for numerous state and federal highway projects, including the expansion of Route 8; was the main sponsor of drunk driving legislation; and was honored as Mother's Against Drunk Driving's (MADD) Man of the Year. He was also a consumer advocate and sponsored legislation affecting consumer rights.

He became a Judge of the Connecticut Superior Court in 1998, where he tried major felony cases and was assigned for more than two years to a panel that tried only murder cases. He also tried contested marital cases, administrative appeals, land use cases, and Freedom of Information matters. He presided in Hartford, New Haven, New Britain, Danbury, and Bridgeport, and also served in the Juvenile Court.

Howard Thomas Owens Jr. was involved in a broad range of professional and civic organizations. He was the first chairman of the Bridgeport Legal Services Board of Directors, a former chairman of the Southeastern Fairfield County Chapter of the American National Red Cross, twice chairman of the Bridgeport Charter Revision Commission, a former member of the City of Bridgeport Ethics Commission, a member of the boards of directors of the Food Bank of Fairfield County, Quazar, Bridge House, and St. Luke's Foundation. He was also a supporter of the Shehan Center, the Bridgeport Boys and Girls Club, and the Child and Family Guidance Center. He was also active in professional legal organizations having served as an officer and member of the Board of Governors of the Connecticut Bar Association; was former State Chairman of the Junior Bar Association; and also was a member of the Criminal Justice Section of the Connecticut Bar Association. He was honored with the Greater Bridgeport Bar Association's Career Service Award in 2013 in recognition of outstanding service as a prosecutor, lawyer, legislator, and judge. He was also a member of the General Gold Selleck Silliman Chapter of the Sons of the American Revolution, and a past member of the Brooklawn Country Club.
