= William A. O'Neill =

American politician (1930–2007)

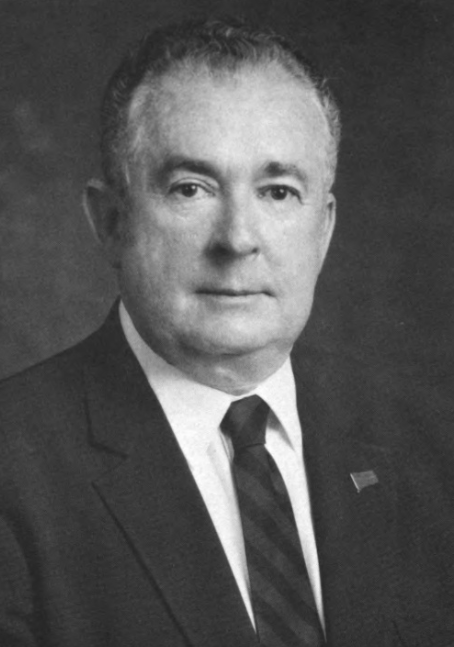
- Official portrait, 1986

84th Governor of Connecticut
- In office December 31, 1980 – January 9, 1991
- Lieutenant: Joseph J. Fauliso
- Preceded by: Ella Grasso
- Succeeded by: Lowell Weicker

102nd Lieutenant Governor of Connecticut
- In office January 3, 1979 – December 31, 1980
- Governor: Ella Grasso
- Preceded by: Robert Killian
- Succeeded by: Joseph J. Fauliso

Chairman of the Connecticut Democratic Party
- In office April 28, 1975 – July 23, 1978
- Preceded by: John M. Bailey
- Succeeded by: John N. Dempsey Jr.

Member of the Connecticut House of Representatives from the 34th district
- In office January 3, 1973 – January 3, 1979
- Preceded by: Robert J. Vicino
- Succeeded by: Dean P. Markham

Member of the Connecticut House of Representatives from the 52nd district
- In office January 4, 1967 – January 3, 1973
- Preceded by: District created
- Succeeded by: Peter F. Locke Jr.

Personal details
- Born: William Atchison O'Neill; August 11, 1930 Hartford, Connecticut, U.S.
- Died: November 24, 2007 (aged 77) East Hampton, Connecticut, U.S.
- Resting place: Connecticut State Veterans Cemetery; Middletown, Connecticut
- Party: Democratic
- Spouse: Nikki O'Neill (m. 1962)
- Profession: Legislator

Military service
- Allegiance: United States
- Branch/service: United States Air Force
- Years of service: 1950–1953
- Battles/wars: Korean War

William Atchison O'Neill (August 11, 1930 – November 24, 2007) was an American politician and member of the Democratic Party who served as the 84th governor of Connecticut from 1980 to 1991. He was the second longest-serving governor in Connecticut history, with just over 10 years in office.

== Biography ==
O'Neill was born in Hartford, Connecticut, the son of Joseph and Frances O'Neill, He was educated at Teachers College of Connecticut (now Central Connecticut State University) and the University of Hartford but left without matriculating. He married Natalie Scott "Nikki" O'Neill (née Damon) in 1962. He also worked for Pratt and Whitney and sold insurance for Prudential Insurance Company.

== Career ==
O'Neill served as a combat pilot with the U.S. Air Force during the Korean War from 1950 to 1953. He was a member of the American Legion and the Veterans of Foreign Wars. Upon his return, he ran the family business—an East Hampton tavern where residents and politicians often met and where he, by his own admission, learned to listen.

Elected to six terms in the Connecticut House of Representatives, O'Neill served as majority leader from 1975 to 1976 and 1977 to 1978. He was House assistant minority leader and assistant majority leader. He chaired the Coalition of Northeastern Governors and the New England Governors' Conference and was president of the Council of State Governments.

O'Neill was elected the 102nd Lieutenant Governor of Connecticut in 1978 on a Democratic ticket along with Governor Ella Grasso. When Grasso resigned for health reasons in December, 1980 (she would pass away the following February), O'Neill became Governor and was elected to a full term in 1982 and re-elected in 1986. In November, 1981 he suffered a heart attack while in office, making a full recovery. O'Neill benefited from the economic boom Connecticut enjoyed during the 1980s when the state's job growth was at a recent historic peak. The state enjoyed large budget surpluses in this era. His large re-election victory in 1986 over Lowell Weicker ally Julie Belaga had an effect on the state legislature, which gained large majorities of liberal Democrats eager to expand state government, such as House Speaker Irving Stolberg.

The 1990 recession hit Connecticut very hard, with the real estate, banking and defense industries all faltering with resultant job losses and tax revenue losses. Facing plummeting approval ratings and a budget situation continuing to deteriorate despite the 1989 tax hike, O'Neill decided in early 1990 to bow out of a re-election bid.

== Death and legacy ==
O'Neill died from emphysema on November 24, 2007, aged 77. He is interred at Connecticut State Veterans Cemetery, Middletown, Connecticut. A terminal at Bradley International Airport is named in his honor.

He was eulogized by his fellow Connecticut politicians as Trumanesque. "I always thought the secret to his success was that he was genuine," said John Droney, who was chairman of the state Democratic party during O'Neill's last term. "He was honest. And he projected the image of an ordinary man called upon to do extraordinary things. He was, in my view, the Harry Truman of Connecticut." Republican state chairman Chris Healy called O'Neill "a good and decent man who served his state and country with distinction."

Connecticut House of Representatives
Preceded by District created	Member of the Connecticut House of Representatives from the 52nd district 1967—1973	Succeeded by Peter F. Locke Jr.
Preceded by Robert J. Vicino	Member of the Connecticut House of Representatives from the 34th district 1973—1979	Succeeded by Dean P. Markham
Party political offices
Preceded by Robert K. Killian	Democratic nominee for Lieutenant Governor of Connecticut; 1978	Succeeded by Joseph J. Fauliso
Preceded by Ella Grasso	Democratic nominee for Governor of Connecticut; 1982, 1986	Succeeded by Bruce Morrison
Political offices
Preceded by Robert Killian	Lieutenant Governor of Connecticut; 1979—1980	Succeeded by Joseph J. Fauliso
Preceded by Ella T. Grasso	Governor of Connecticut; 1980—1991	Succeeded by Lowell P. Weicker
