= Robert K. Killian =

American politician

Robert Kenneth Killian

101st Lieutenant Governor of Connecticut
- In office January 8, 1975 – January 3, 1979
- Governor: Ella Grasso
- Preceded by: Peter L. Cashman
- Succeeded by: William O'Neill

19th Attorney General of Connecticut
- In office January 1967 – January 1975
- Governor: John N. Dempsey, Thomas J. Meskill
- Preceded by: Harold M. Mulvey
- Succeeded by: Carl R. Ajello

Personal details
- Born: September 15, 1919; Hartford, Connecticut, U.S.
- Died: June 25, 2005 (aged 85); Hartford, Connecticut, U.S.
- Political party: Democratic
- Education: Union College (B.A.); Hartford Law School (LL.B.)

Robert Kenneth Killian (September 15, 1919 – June 25, 2005) was an American politician and attorney from Connecticut.

== Early life and education ==
Killian was born in Hartford in 1919. He served as a first lieutenant in the United States Army for four years during World War II, commanding an infantry company. He received four battle stars and a Purple Heart and took part in island campaigns at Kwajalein, Palau, Mindanao, and Okinawa.

== Career ==
After returning to the United States, Killian graduated from Union College with his Bachelor of Arts in 1942. He received his LL.B. from Hartford Law School on 1948. He was admitted to the bar in Connecticut in 1948 and joined his law school classmate Robert Krechevsky and Samuel Gould to found the Hartford law firm, Gould, Killian and Krechevsky (now Gould, Killian and Wynne).

He served as the city of Hartford's assistant corporation counsel from 1951 to 1954. He became chairman of the Hartford Democratic Town Committee in 1963 and is credited with helping to get elected Hartford's first African American councilman and state Senator. His friendship with John "Boss" Bailey, the state Democratic Party chairman, resulted in his appointment in 1967 as state Attorney General; Governor John N. Dempsey chose Killian to fill the vacancy left by Harold M. Mulvey. He won election in his own right three years later, one of only two Democrats to survive a Republican sweep of statewide offices, including the governorship.

In 1974, Killian was elected the 101st Lieutenant Governor of Connecticut on the ticket headed by Governor Ella Grasso. Displeased with the way the governor was handling issues including the state's fiscal crisis as her re-election approached, Killian waged a bitter primary campaign against Grasso in 1978. He lost and was replaced on the ticket by William A. O'Neill, who later succeeded Grasso as governor in 1980 after her resignation shortly before her death from cancer.

== Last years ==
Killian then spent a decade as chairman of the Hartford Civic Center and Coliseum Commission. He died in Hartford in 2005, aged 85, and is interred at Mount Saint Benedict Cemetery in Bloomfield, Connecticut.

== Other ==
Killian was a Roman Catholic and a member of the American Bar Association (ABA), the Elks, the Knights of Columbus and the Friendly Sons of St. Patrick.

While he was Connecticut Attorney General, Killian's office defended a 1970 decision by Connecticut's Commissioner of Motor Vehicles, John Tynan, to deny a drivers license to a man, David E. Follett, on the basis that he was "an admitted homosexual". Follett later killed himself.

Party political offices
Preceded by Harold M. Mulvey	Democratic nominee for Connecticut Attorney General; 1970	Succeeded by Carl R. Ajello
Preceded by Hugh C. Curran	Democratic nominee for Lieutenant Governor of Connecticut; 1974	Succeeded by William A. O'Neill
Legal offices
Preceded by Harold M. Mulvey	Attorney General of Connecticut; 1967–1975	Succeeded by Carl R. Ajello
Political offices
Preceded by Peter L. Cashman	Lieutenant Governor of Connecticut; 1975–1979	Succeeded by William O'Neill
