= Connecticut's 15th State Senate district =

American legislative district

Senator
Joan Hartley; D

Connecticut's 15th State Senate district elects one member of the Connecticut State Senate. It encompasses parts of Waterbury, Middlebury, and Naugatuck. It has been represented by Democrat Joan Hartley since 2001.

== Recent elections ==
=== 2020 ===
2020 Connecticut State Senate election, District 15
Party	Candidate	Votes	%
Democratic	Joan V. Hartley (incumbent)	20,367	81.99
Independent Party	Joan V. Hartley (incumbent)	4,473	18.01
Total votes		24,840	100.00
Democratic hold			

=== 2018 ===
2018 Connecticut State Senate election, District 15
Party	Candidate	Votes	%
Democratic	Joan Hartley (incumbent)	16,426	84.7
Independent	James Russell	2,963	15.3
Total votes		19,389	100.0
Democratic hold			

=== 2016 ===
2016 Connecticut State Senate election, District 15
Party	Candidate	Votes	%
Democratic	Joan Hartley (incumbent)	20,312	82.17
Independent	James Russell	4,407	17.83
Total votes		24,719	100.0
Democratic hold			

=== 2014 ===
2014 Connecticut State Senate election, District 15
Party	Candidate	Votes	%
Democratic	Joan Hartley (incumbent)	12,083	63.00
Republican	Karl D. Shehu	5,739	29.9
Independent	Joan Hartley	851	4.4
Working Families	Blair Bertaccini	510	2.7
Total votes		19,183	100.0
Democratic hold			

=== 2012 ===
2012 Connecticut State Senate election, District 15
Party	Candidate	Votes	%
Democratic	Joan Hartley (incumbent)	19,927	85.20
Independent	Andrew Larsen	2,334	10.00
Working Families	Blair Bertaccini	1,140	4.9
Total votes		23,401	100.0
Democratic hold			
