= Jerry Labriola =

American politician (1931–2024)

Member of the Connecticut State Senate from the 15th district
- In office 1981–1983
- Preceded by: Louis Cutillo
- Succeeded by: Robert G. Dorr

Personal details
- Born: May 17, 1931 Naugatuck, Connecticut, U.S.
- Died: April 28, 2024 (aged 92)
- Party: Republican
- Children: 3, including David
- Education: Yale University; Thomas Jefferson University

Military service
- Allegiance: United States
- Branch/service: United States Navy

Gerald Labriola (May 17, 1931 – April 28, 2024) was an American mystery writer, physician, politician, and assistant professor at the University of Connecticut Medical School. In Connecticut's 1994 U.S. Senate election, he ran a losing campaign as the Republican nominee against Democrat Joe Lieberman. He also ran unsuccessfully for Governor of Connecticut and served in the Connecticut Senate.

Labriola died on April 28, 2024, at the age of 92.

His son, Jerry Labriola Jr. was chairman of the Connecticut Republican Party from 2011 to 2015. His other son, David, was a member of the Connecticut House of Representatives from the 131st district from 2003 to 2025.

Party political offices
Preceded by Lewis Rome	Republican nominee for Lieutenant Governor of Connecticut; 1982	Succeeded by E. Clayton Gengras, Jr.
Preceded by Lowell P. Weicker Jr.	Republican nominee for United States Senator from Connecticut (Class 1); 1994	Succeeded by Philip Giordano
