= 2026 Connecticut Senate election =

2026 Connecticut State Senate election
- November 3, 2026

All 36 seats in the Connecticut Senate 19 seats needed for a majority
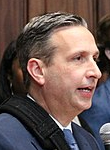

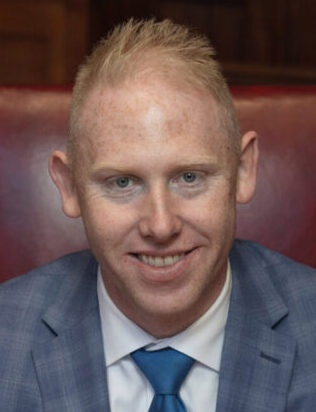
	Majority party	Minority party
Leader	Bob Duff	Stephen Harding (lost re-election)
Party	Democratic	Republican
Leader since	January 7, 2015	February 16, 2024
Leader's seat	District 25	District 30
Last election	25	11
Seats won	33	3
Seat change	▲8	▼8
- Democratic hold Democratic gain Republican hold
President Pro Tempore before election
Martin Looney
Democratic
Elected President Pro Tempore
TBD

The 2026 Connecticut State Senate election was held on November 3, 2026, alongside the other 2026 United States elections. Voters elected members of the Connecticut State Senate in all 36 of the U.S. state of Connecticut's legislative districts to serve a two-year term.

With a commanding 33-3 majority, Democrats won their largest majority ever in the chamber.

== Retirements ==
=== Republicans ===
1. District 28: Tony Hwang retired.
2. District 36: Ryan Fazio retired to run for governor.

=== Democrats ===
1. District 11: Martin Looney retired.
2. District 13: Jan Hochadel retired.
3. District 26: Ceci Maher retired.

== Incumbents defeated ==
=== In primary election ===
==== Democrats ====
1. District 2: Doug McCrory lost re-nomination to Maryam Khan.

=== In general election ===
==== Republicans ====
1. District 7: John Kissel lost reelection to David Kiner.
2. District 18: Heather Somers lost reelection to Joe de la Cruz.
3. District 21: Jason Perillo lost reelection to Carolann Reid.
4. District 30: Stephen Harding lost reelection to Aaron Zimmer.
5. District 34: Paul Cicarella lost reelection to Brandi Mandato.
6. District 35: Jeff Gordon lost reelection to Ethan Werstler.

== Open seats that changed parties ==
=== Republican seats won by Democrats ===
1. District 28: Won by Rob Blanchard
2. District 36: Won by Jill Oberlander

== Predictions ==
Source	Ranking	As of
Sabato's Crystal Ball	Safe D	January 22, 2026
State Navigate	Safe D	October 14, 2026

== Summary of results by district ==
District	2024 Pres.	Incumbent	Party	Elected Senator	Outcome
1st	D+37.5	John Fonfara	Dem	John Fonfara	Dem Hold
2nd	D+65.4	Douglas McCrory	Dem	Maryam Khan	Dem Hold
3rd	D+22.7	Saud Anwar	Dem	Saud Anwar	Dem Hold
4th	D+26.2	MD Rahman	Dem	MD Rahman	Dem Hold
5th	D+37.6	Derek Slap	Dem	Derek Slap	Dem Hold
6th	D+12.0	Rick Lopes	Dem	Rick Lopes	Dem Hold
7th	D+2.2	John Kissel	Rep	David Kiner	Dem Gain
8th	D+9.8	Paul Honig	Dem	Paul Honig	Dem Hold
9th	D+14.7	Matthew Lesser	Dem	Matthew Lesser	Dem Hold
10th	D+61.2	Gary Winfield	Dem	Gary Winfield	Dem Hold
11th	D+53.0	Martin Looney	Dem	Alphonse Paolillo	Dem Hold
12th	D+14.2	Christine Cohen	Dem	Christine Cohen	Dem Hold
13th	D+15.4	Jan Hochadel	Dem	Jack Fazzino	Dem Hold
14th	D+3.3	James Maroney	Dem	James Maroney	Dem Hold
15th	D+6.9	Joan Hartley	Dem	Joan Hartley	Dem Hold
16th	R+9.7	Robert Sampson	Rep	Robert Sampson	Rep Hold
17th	D+12.7	Jorge Cabrera	Dem	Jorge Cabrera	Dem Hold
18th	D+5.3	Heather Somers	Rep	Joe de la Cruz	Dem Gain
19th	D+6.4	Catherine Osten	Dem	Catherine Osten	Dem Hold
20th	D+17.9	Martha Marx	Dem	Martha Marx	Dem Hold
21st	R+0.5	Jason Perillo	Rep	Carolann Reid	Dem Gain
22nd	D+18.8	Sujata Gadkar-Wilcox	Dem	Sujata Gadkar-Wilcox	Dem Hold
23rd	D+50.9	Herron Gaston	Dem	Herron Gaston	Dem Hold
24th	D+7.4	Julie Kushner	Dem	Julie Kushner	Dem Hold
25th	D+28.0	Bob Duff	Dem	Bob Duff	Dem Hold
26th	D+32.9	Ceci Maher	Dem	Sam Nestor	Dem Hold
27th	D+28.1	Patricia Billie Miller	Dem	Patricia Billie Miller	Dem Hold
28th	D+18.3	Tony Hwang	Rep	Rob Blanchard	Dem Gain
29th	D+3.5	Mae Flexer	Dem	Mae Flexer	Dem Hold
30th	D+0.9	Stephen Harding	Rep	Aaron Zimmer	Dem Gain
31st	R+8.0	Henri Martin	Rep	Henri Martin	Rep Hold
32nd	R+9.2	Eric Berthel	Rep	Eric Berthel	Rep Hold
33rd	D+9.4	Norman Needleman	Dem	Norman Needleman	Dem Hold
34th	R+4.6	Paul Cicarella	Rep	Brandi Mandato	Dem Gain
35th	D+3.0	Jeff Gordon	Rep	Ethan Werstler	Dem Gain
36th	D+16.8	Ryan Fazio	Rep	Jill Oberlander	Dem Gain

== Detailed results ==
Source: Connecticut State Elections Enforcement Commission.

=== District 1 ===
Connecticut's 1st State Senate district election, 2026
Party	Candidate	Votes	%
Democratic	John Fonfara (incumbent)	14,257	90.84%
Green	Luis Delgado	1,438	9.16%
Total votes		15,695	100%
Democratic hold			

=== District 2 ===
Democratic primary
Party	Candidate	Votes	%
Democratic	Maryam Khan	3,889	40.6%
Democratic	Ayana Taylor	3,080	32.2%
Democratic	Doug McCrory (incumbent)	2,605	27.2%
Total votes			98%

Connecticut's 2nd State Senate district election, 2026
Party	Candidate	Votes	%
Democratic	Maryam Khan	23,804	84.69%
Republican	Tim Knotts	4,303	15.31%
Total votes		28,107	100%
Democratic hold			

=== District 3 ===
Connecticut's 3rd State Senate district election, 2026
Party	Candidate	Votes	%
Democratic	Saud Anwar (incumbent)	21,746	67.05%
Republican	Elliot Hughes	10,684	32.94%
Total votes		32,430	100%
Democratic hold			

=== District 4 ===
Connecticut's 4th State Senate district election, 2026
Party	Candidate	Votes	%
Democratic	MD Rahman (incumbent)	26,329	65.90%
Republican	Jenn Jennings	13,621	34.10%
Total votes		39,950	100%
Democratic hold			

=== District 5 ===
Connecticut's 5th State Senate district election, 2026
Party	Candidate	Votes	%
Democratic	Derek Slap (incumbent)	33,092	100%
Total votes		33,092	100%
Democratic hold			

=== District 6 ===
Connecticut's 6th State Senate district election, 2026
Party	Candidate	Votes	%
Democratic	Rick Lopes (incumbent)	15,899	63.85%
Republican	Tremell Collins	9,001	36.15%
Total votes		24,900	100%
Democratic hold			

=== District 7 ===
Connecticut's 7th State Senate district election, 2026
Party	Candidate	Votes	%
Democratic	David Kiner	22,113	55.43%
Republican	John Kissel (incumbent)	17,579	44.57%
Total votes		39,692	100%
Democratic gain from Republican			

=== District 8 ===
Connecticut's 8th State Senate district election, 2026
Party	Candidate	Votes	%
Democratic	Paul Honig (incumbent)	26,937	60.06%
Republican	Mike Criss	17,916	39.94%
Total votes		44,853	100%
Democratic hold			

=== District 9 ===
Connecticut's 9th State Senate district election, 2026
Party	Candidate	Votes	%
Democratic	Matt Lesser (incumbent)	24,169	64.38%
Republican	Grant Polomsky	12,539	33.40%
Independent Party	Gwen Samuel	834	2.22%
Total votes		37,542	100%
Democratic hold			

=== District 10 ===
Connecticut's 10th State Senate district election, 2026
Party	Candidate	Votes	%
Democratic	Gary Winfield (incumbent)	16,232	100%
Total votes		16,232	100%
Democratic hold			

=== District 11 ===
Connecticut's 11th State Senate district election, 2026
Party	Candidate	Votes	%
Democratic	Al Paolillo	18,760	89.72%
Workers' Voice Party	Rosa Pepper-Macias	2,149	10.28%
Total votes		20,909	100%
Democratic hold			

=== District 12 ===
Connecticut's 12th State Senate district election, 2026
Party	Candidate	Votes	%
Democratic	Christine Cohen (incumbent)	28,994	60.84%
Republican	Lisa Deane	18,662	39.16%
Total votes		47,656	100%
Democratic hold			

=== District 13 ===
Democratic primary
Party	Candidate	Votes	%
Democratic	Jack Fazzino	3,157	63.2%
Democratic	Jim Jinks	1,841	36.8%
Total votes		4,998	100%

Connecticut's 13th State Senate district election, 2026
Party	Candidate	Votes	%
Democratic	Jack Fazzino	22,019	86.72%
Independent Party	Lamar Terrell	3,371	13.28%
Total votes		25,390	100%
Democratic hold			

=== District 14 ===
Connecticut's 14th State Senate district election, 2026
Party	Candidate	Votes	%
Democratic	James Maroney (incumbent)	22,900	57.99%
Republican	Owen Weaver	15,452	39.13%
Independent Party	James Maroney	1,137	2.88%
Total votes		39,489	100%
Democratic hold			

=== District 15 ===
Connecticut's 15th State Senate district election, 2026
Party	Candidate	Votes	%
Democratic	Joan Hartley (incumbent)	13,988	67.43%
Republican	Ruben Rodriguez	6,755	32.57%
Total votes		20,743	100%
Democratic hold			

=== District 16 ===
Connecticut's 16th State Senate district election, 2026
Party	Candidate	Votes	%
Republican	Robert Sampson (incumbent)	20,458	50.62%
Democratic	Jack Perry	19,952	49.37%
Total votes		40,410	100%
Republican hold			

=== District 17 ===
Connecticut's 17th State Senate district election, 2026
Party	Candidate	Votes	%
Democratic	Jorge Cabrera (incumbent)	21,484	62.54%
Republican	John-Paul Dorais	12,869	37.46%
Total votes		34,353	100%
Democratic hold			

=== District 18 ===
Connecticut's 18th State Senate district election, 2026
Party	Candidate	Votes	%
Democratic	Joe de la Cruz	19,828	52.48%
Republican	Heather Somers (incumbent)	17,951	47.52%
Total votes		37,779	100%
Democratic gain from Republican			

=== District 19 ===
Republican primary
Party	Candidate	Votes	%
Republican	Jason Guidone	1,162	56.22%
Republican	Mike France	905	43.78%
Total votes		2,067	100.00%

Connecticut's 19th State Senate district election, 2026
Party	Candidate	Votes	%
Democratic	Catherine Osten (incumbent)	21,605	59.72%
Republican	Jason Guidone	14,573	40.28%
Total votes		36,178	100%
Democratic hold			

=== District 20 ===
Connecticut's 20th State Senate district election, 2026
Party	Candidate	Votes	%
Democratic	Martha Marx (incumbent)	23,434	59.08%
Republican	Lee Elci	16,234	40.92%
Total votes		39,668	100%
Democratic hold			

=== District 21 ===
Connecticut's 21th State Senate district election, 2026
Party	Candidate	Votes	%
Democratic	Carolann Reid	21,407	50.87%
Republican	Jason Perillo (incumbent)	20,676	49.13%
Total votes		42,083	100%
Democratic gain from Republican			

=== District 22 ===
Connecticut's 22nd State Senate district election, 2026
Party	Candidate	Votes	%
Democratic	Sujata Gadkar-Wilcox (incumbent)	19,344	65.36%
Republican	Scott Modlin	10,251	34.64%
Total votes		29,595	100%
Democratic hold			

=== District 23 ===
Connecticut's 23rd State Senate district election, 2026
Party	Candidate	Votes	%
Democratic	Herron Gaston (incumbent)	10,891	93.67%
New Movement Party	Natasha Williams	736	6.33%
Total votes		11,627	100%
Democratic hold			

=== District 24 ===
Connecticut's 24th State Senate district election, 2026
Party	Candidate	Votes	%
Democratic	Julie Kushner (incumbent)	18,257	62.54%
Republican	Melissa Lindsey	10,934	37.46%
Total votes		29,191	100%
Democratic hold			

=== District 25 ===
Connecticut's 25th State Senate district election, 2026
Party	Candidate	Votes	%
Democratic	Bob Duff (incumbent)	22,764	68.05%
Republican	Justin Perry	10,690	31.95%
Total votes		33,454	100%
Democratic hold			

=== District 26 ===
Connecticut's 26th State Senate district election, 2026
Party	Candidate	Votes	%
Democratic	Samantha Nestor	28,585	65.41%
Republican	Alma Sarelli	15,114	34.59%
Total votes		43,699	100%
Democratic hold			

=== District 27 ===
Connecticut's 27th State Senate district election, 2026
Party	Candidate	Votes	%
Democratic	Patricia Billie Miller (incumbent)	20,892	100%
Total votes		20,892	100%
Democratic hold			

=== District 28 ===
Connecticut's 28th State Senate district election, 2026
Party	Candidate	Votes	%
Democratic	Rob Blanchard	27,855	61.02%
Republican	Amybeth Laroche	17,791	38.98%
Total votes		45,646	100%
Democratic gain from Republican			

=== District 29 ===
Connecticut's 29th State Senate district election, 2026
Party	Candidate	Votes	%
Democratic	Mae Flexer (incumbent)	18,567	58.62%
Republican	Christopher Reddy	13,107	41.38%
Total votes		31,674	100%
Democratic hold			

=== District 30 ===
Senate Minority Leader Stephen Harding ran for reelection for a third term, but was defeated by Aaron Zimmer.

Connecticut's 30th State Senate district election, 2026
Party	Candidate	Votes	%
Democratic	Aaron Zimmer	22,820	51.63%
Republican	Stephen Harding (incumbent)	21,383	48.37%
Total votes		44,203	100%
Democratic gain from Republican			

=== District 31 ===
Connecticut's 31st State Senate district election, 2026
Party	Candidate	Votes	%
Republican	Henri Martin (incumbent)	19,578	53.68%
Democratic	Laurel LaPorte-Grimes	16,897	46.32%
Total votes		36,475	100%
Republican hold			

=== District 32 ===
Connecticut's 32th State Senate district election, 2026
Party	Candidate	Votes	%
Republican	Eric Berthel (incumbent)	25,632	53.18%
Democratic	Matt Knickerbocker	22,570	46.82%
Total votes		48,202	100%
Republican hold			

=== District 33 ===
Connecticut's 33rd State Senate district election, 2026
Party	Candidate	Votes	%
Democratic	Norman Needleman (incumbent)	29,260	59.39%
Republican	Charles Ferraro	20,006	40.61%
Total votes		49,266	100%
Democratic hold			

=== District 34 ===
Connecticut's 34th State Senate district election, 2026
Party	Candidate	Votes	%
Democratic	Brandi Mandato	19,203	50.30%
Republican	Paul Cicarella (incumbent)	18,974	49.70%
Total votes		38,177	100%
Democratic gain from Republican			

=== District 35 ===
Connecticut's 35th State Senate district election, 2026
Party	Candidate	Votes	%
Democratic	Ethan Werstler	22,719	54.08%
Republican	Jeff Gordon (incumbent)	19,294	45.92%
Total votes		42,013	100%
Democratic gain from Republican			

=== District 36 ===
Connecticut's 36th State Senate district election, 2026
Party	Candidate	Votes	%
Democratic	Jill Oberlander	22,896	54.96%
Republican	Joseph Kelly	18,761	45.04%
Total votes		41,657	100%
Democratic gain from Republican			

== Analysis ==
The Connecticut GOP won just three of the Connecticut State Senate's 36 seats, its worst result ever. Connecticut State Senate Majority Leader Bob Duff said the Connecticut Democrats' success was due to more than just the 2026 blue wave, saying that the state party "targeted every Republican seat but two, and the two we didn't were in firm Republican hands". This characterization was disputed by Connecticut Republican Party Chair Ben Proto, who said the results had "absolutely nothing to do with me or Vin or Steve and the state of the Republican Party in Connecticut", referencing Republicans' Connecticut State House of Representatives and State Senate leaders, respectively. Stephen Harding, the Senate Minority Leader, lost his seat in his re-election. Harding stated that the GOP's three members would be "spread so thin, trying to attend every public heading. Inherently there's going to be missed opportunity for Republican voices". Henri Martin, one of the three Republican Senators to survive, said it would be "impossible" for the GOP's three members to serve as ranking members for each of the Connecticut General Assembly's 27 committees, and joked that maybe the Connecticut Democrats "could give us a couple seats back.

The results prompted some conservatives in Connecticut to call for Ben Proto to resign as the Chair of the Connecticut Republican Party. The Hartford Courant reported that "Facebook had numerous memes Wednesday calling for GOP State Chairman Ben Proto to step down, but he had promised Tuesday morning that he'll stay through the middle of next year". On one of WTNH News 8's programs, a Connecticut Republican strategist called for Ben Proto to resign, saying "he has been Chair for long enough".
