= Tony Hwang =

American real estate agent and politician

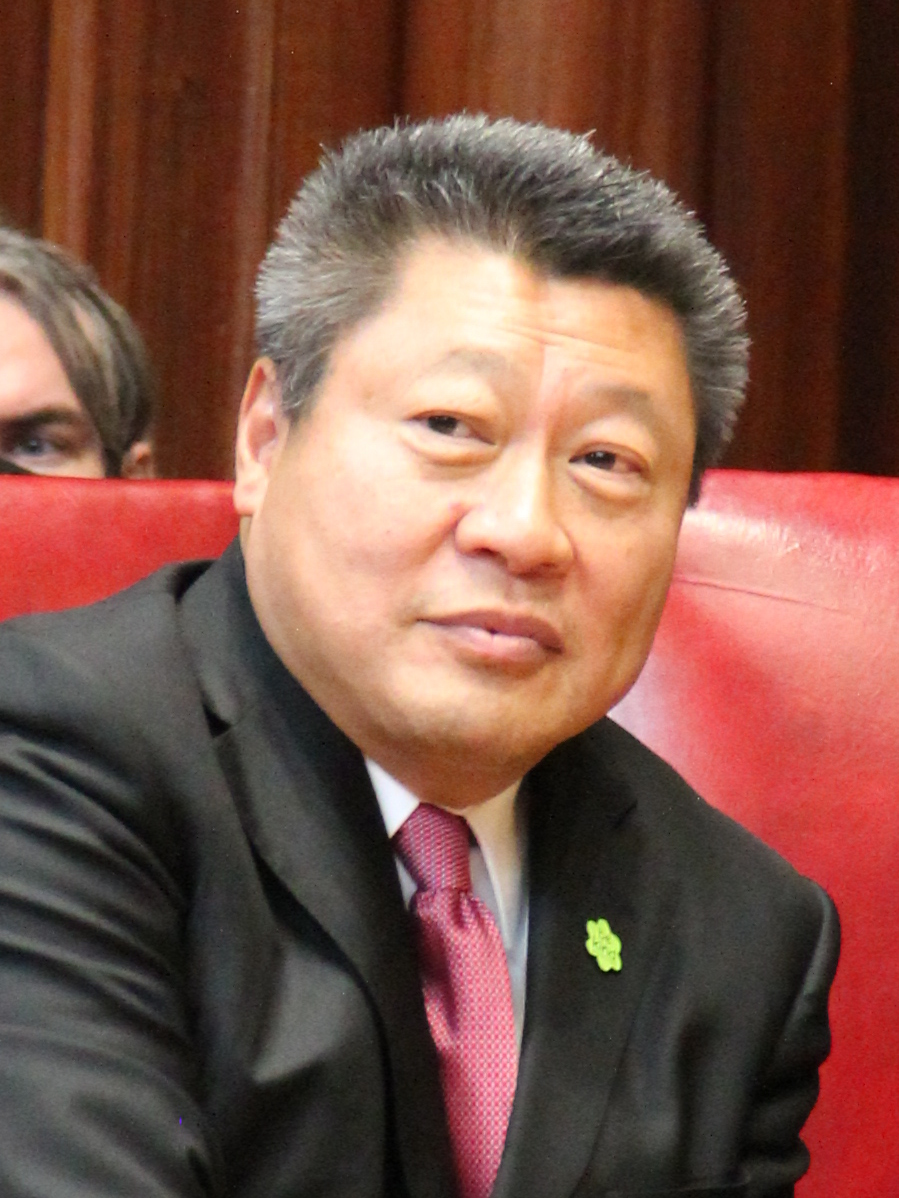
- Hwang in 2023

Member of the Connecticut State Senate from the 28th district
- Incumbent
- Assumed office 2015
- Preceded by: John P. McKinney

Member of the Connecticut House of Representatives from the 134th district
- In office 2009–2015
- Preceded by: Tom F. Christiano
- Succeeded by: Laura Devlin

Personal details
- Born: September 17, 1964 (age 62) Kaohsiung, Taiwan
- Party: Republican
- Education: Cornell University (BS)
- Website: www.tonyhwang.org

Anthony T. Hwang (born September 17, 1964) is an American politician serving as a member of the Connecticut State Senate from the 28th District, which contains the towns of Fairfield, Easton, Newtown, and part of Bethel. A member of the Republican Party, he was first elected to the state senate in 2014, and previously represented the 134th district in the Connecticut General Assembly. He serves as the Chief Deputy Republican Leader, and the Ranking Member on the Aging, Transportation, and Insurance and Real Estate Committees.

On March 31, 2026, Hwang announced that he would not seek re-election to a sixth term in the State Senate, choosing to retire from state elected office at the conclusion of his term in January 2027.

== Early life and education ==
Hwang was born in Kaohsiung, Taiwan, after his parents fled the Communist government in mainland China as teenagers and re-settled in Taiwan. The family immigrated to the United States when Hwang was approximately nine years old and settled in Syracuse, New York. He received a Bachelor's degree in labor relations and organizational behavior from Cornell University.

== Career ==
Hwang worked for United Technologies before becoming a licensed realtor in Fairfield. In 2005, Hwang entered politics and was elected to the Fairfield RTM. In 2008, he defeated Incumbent Tom Christiano for the 134th State House seat, and was re-elected in 2010 and 2012.

In 2014, State Senator John McKinney vacated his State Senate seat to unsuccessfully run for governor, and endorsed Hwang as his successor. In the general election, Hwang defeated the Democratic nominee, State Representative Kim Fawcett of the 133rd district 56%-44%.

In 2016, Hwang received re-election endorsements from Robert H. Steele, John Kasich, the Connecticut League of Conservation Voters. He defeated Democrat Philip Dwyer, with over 60% of the vote.

In 2018, Hwang defeated Democrat Michelle McCabe, 52%-48%; in a 2020 rematch, Hwang defeated McCabe 51.7%-48.3%.

In 2022, Hwang faced off against Tim Gavin, a 28-year-old Yale graduate and Army Veteran, who he beat 50.7%-49.3%.

In 2024, Hwang faced Rob Blanchard, a close advisor to Connecticut Governor Ned Lamont, who he defeated 54.6%-45.4%.

Following the death of Fairfield First Selectman Bill Gerber in 2025, Hwang announced that he would collect signatures to force a special election for the seat, and that he would run to serve the remainder of Gerber's term. In February 2026, Hwang lost this special election 56%-44% to Christine Vitale, Gerber's running mate in 2023, who had been serving as First Selectperson since his death.

At various points since 2013, Hwang has publicly considered running for statewide office, and in 2017 had an exploratory committee for governor. Thus far, Hwang has opted not to run for statewide office.

=== Tenure and political positions ===
In 2019, the Connecticut League of Conservation Voters gave Hwang a "lifetime score" of 88% and called him "a thoughtful voice on the environment and conservation," citing his advocacy for the Long Island Sound Blue Plan and State Water Plan. The group endorsed Hwang's campaign for the state Senate in 2014. In 2019, he supported a plastic bag ban.

The Hartford Courant described Hwang in 2019 as a moderate Republican. During the 2016 Republican Party presidential primaries, Hwang supported John Kasich, and was named Connecticut state chairman of Kasich's campaign. He hosted campaign events with Kasich in the state. Hwang opposed Donald Trump and condemned Trump's insults targeting women, minorities, immigrants, and persons with disabilities; Hwang said in October 2016: "Trump's comments are unacceptable under any circumstances. It perpetuates the potential cycle of violence. I can't say it strong enough that I condemn them. I have never supported him because of those comments."

As of 2020, Hwang is the ranking member of the state Senate committees on housing, higher education, public safety and security, and transportation. Hwang was a member of the Legislative Environment Committee in 2011 and 2012.

Hwang voted against a pro-net neutrality bill in 2018, arguing that the matter is a federal issue. Like most Connecticut Republican legislators, Hwang opposes the legalization of marijuana; he opposed proposals in 2019 to legalize, tax, and regulate recreational marijuana in Connecticut. He is an outspoken opponent of legalized gambling in Connecticut, and has opposed moves to allow additional casinos and other gambling businesses to operate in the state.

== Controversies ==
=== Campaign spending and advertisement controversies ===
In 2014, the Connecticut State Elections Enforcement Commission investigated Hwang over an allegation of failure to disclose campaign purchases. The Commission authorized the investigation after reviewing complaints and submitted materials from Town of Fairfield's Democratic Town Committee. Hwang denied wrongdoing, and accused the Fairfield Democratic Town Committee as trying to distract the electorate.

In 2016, the State Elections Enforcement Commission fined Hwang $400 for violation of rules on campaign contribution limits.

Hwang spent $15,020 on advertising on place mats at a Connecticut restaurant chain. He purchased the ads with personal funds and was later reimbursed the cost by his political committee. Hwang initially did not disclose the reimbursement on his campaign disclosure filings. A local Democratic committee chairman filed an elections complaint against Hwang for the lapse in 2016. In December 2017, the state Elections Enforcement Commission ruled that the failure to disclosure was unintentional, and directed him to correct his filings. In January 2017, Hwang also reported spending $2,850 on "Wikipedia information management" services.

In 2018, some of Hwang's campaign signs included copyrighted art from the nonprofit, nonpartisan organizations Hate Has No Home Here and Ben's Bells, without permission from the groups. After the use of the art was reported, Hwang issued an apology, said that the use was unintentional, and removed the signs and text at issue.

=== Public Argument With High School Girl ===
On Election Day in 2019, a high school student volunteer argued with Hwang at Fairfield's District 1 polling place about socialism. The exchange eventually got heated and brought the student to tears, prompting a Facebook post from her mother that circulated on social media. Hwang later apologized to the student, citing he did not intend to hurt the student's feelings, but rather to educate her on the topic.
