= Palo Verde High Magnet School (Arizona) =

Coordinates: 32.205099°N 110.844382°W

Location
- 1302 S Avienda Vega; Tucson, Arizona 85710; United States

Information
- Type: Public
- Established: August 30, 1962 (64 years ago)
- School district: Tucson Unified
- CEEB code: 030493
- Principal: Eric Brock
- Staff: 58.21 (FTE)
- Enrollment: 676 (2023-2024)
- Student to teacher ratio: 11.61
- Colors: Royal blue and gold
- Mascot: Titans
- Website: paloverdehs.tusd1.org

Palo Verde High Magnet School is located at 1302 South Avenida Vega in Terra Del Sol, Tucson, Arizona. The school has been open since 1962. Its current principal is Eric Brock. The school's name comes from the surrounding Palo Verde trees, native to Tucson. Its mascot is the Titan and the school colors are royal blue and gold. Palo Verde is also a magnet school specializing in engineering and technology. As of the 2023–2024 school year, Palo Verde had an enrollment of 676 students in grades 9–12.

== History ==
Palo Verde High School adjusted its focus to become a magnet high school to attract students from all outside its school zone. In order to attract new students, the school set its focused on engineering and technology, one of the first high school do this. As of 2018, Palo Vere High Magnet School is a S.T.E.A.M. school and was given a grade of B− and ranked 23rd of 521 Most Diverse Public High Schools in Arizona as well as 177th of 325 for Best Public High School Teachers in Arizona. The school also has a highly ranked robotics program, and engineering students that have the opportunity to secure internships at local engineering and manufacturing companies.

== Family Resource Center ==
The school also has a family resource center that offers workshops and events including kindergarten transition classes for parents of kindergartners going into public school, grief workshops through Tu Nidito, a non profit that provides support for children and families affected by traumatic experiences including a serious medical condition or death, as well as a produce cooking class. The resource center is also part of the Tucson Unified School District and is housed in other schools including Catalina Magnet High School and Wakefield Middle School. The resource center is open to the public and offers classes in multiple languages.

== Notable graduates ==
- Thad Allen – Admiral, Commandant of the United States Coast Guard
- Jim Arneson – Former NFL player (Dallas Cowboys, Washington Redskins)
- Mark Arneson – All American at University of Arizona, and All Pro Linebacker St Louis Cardinals
- Tim Bee – Arizona Senate President, Congressional Candidate
- Brooke Burke (1989 Homecoming queen) – Actress, dancer and model.
- Bryce Cotton – Point Guard for Phoenix Suns of the NBA
- Corky Evans Class of 66 – Former British Columbia cabinet minister
- Andy Hassler – youngest pitcher to pitch in Yankee Stadium
- Joe Hassler – Former MLB player (Philadelphia Athletics, Saint Louis Browns)
- Jack Howell – Former MLB player (California Angels, San Diego Padres, Houston Astros)
- Bob Lacey – Former MLB player (Oakland Athletics, Texas Rangers, Cleveland Indians, San Francisco Giants)
- Garry Shandling – Actor/Comedian
- Nick Young – Actor
