= Connecticut's 7th House of Representatives district =

American legislative district

Connecticut's 7th State House of Representatives district
Representative
Joshua M. Hall; D

Connecticut's 7th House of Representatives district elects one member of the Connecticut House of Representatives. Its current representative is Joshua M. Hall. The district consists of the west- and north-central parts of the city of Hartford, including the neighborhoods of Asylum Hill and Upper Albany. The district is one of the few in Connecticut to have a Black majority population, along with the neighboring 1st and 5th districts.

== List of representatives ==
List of Representatives from Connecticut's 7th House District
Representative	Party	Years	District home	Note
Norris L. O'Neill	Democratic	1967–1971	Hartford	Seat created
Clyde Billington Jr.	Democratic	1971–1979	Hartford	
Thirman Milner	Democratic	1979–1981	Hartford	
Carrie Saxon Perry	Democratic	1981–1987	Hartford	Elected Mayor of Hartford
Annette Carter	Democratic	1988–2005	Hartford	Elected in special election
Douglas McCrory	Democratic	2005–2017	Hartford	Resigned after being elected to Connecticut Senate
Joshua M. Hall	Democratic	2017–present	Hartford	Incumbent

== Recent elections ==
Democratic Primary, August 10, 2010: House District 7
Party	Candidate	Votes	%	±%
Democratic	Douglas McCrory	947	66.8	
Democratic	R.J. Winch	471	33.2	
Majority		576	40.6	
Turnout		1,418		

State Election 2008: House District 7
Party	Candidate	Votes	%	±%
Democratic	Douglas McCrory	5,049	100.0	+6.5
Majority		5,049	100.0	+13.0
Turnout		5,049		
Democratic hold		Swing	+6.5	

State Election 2006: House District 7
Party	Candidate	Votes	%	±%
Democratic	Douglas McCrory	2,550	93.5	−6.5
Republican	Walter R. Butler	178	6.5	+6.5
Majority		2,372	87.0	−13.0
Turnout		2,728		
Democratic hold		Swing	-6.5	

State Election 2004: House District 7
Party	Candidate	Votes	%	±%
Democratic	Douglas McCrory	4,210	100.0	+7.8
Majority		4,210	100.0	+15.5
Turnout		4,210		
Democratic hold		Swing	+7.8	

Democratic Primary, August 10, 2004: House District 7
Party	Candidate	Votes	%	±%
Democratic	Douglas McCrory	1,024	68.0	
Democratic	Annette Carter	482	32.0	
Majority		542	36.0	
Turnout		1,506		

State Election 2002: House District 7
Party	Candidate	Votes	%	±%
Democratic	Annette Carter	2,700	92.2	−7.8
Republican	Walter R. Butler	227	7.8	+7.8
Majority		2,473	84.5	−15.5
Turnout		2,927		
Democratic hold		Swing	-7.8	

State Election 2000: House District 7
Party	Candidate	Votes	%	±%
Democratic	Annette Carter	4,829	100.0	+0.0
Majority		4,829	100.0	+0.0
Turnout		4,829		
Democratic hold		Swing	+0.0	

State Election 1998: House District 7
Party	Candidate	Votes	%	±%
Democratic	Annette Carter	3,427	100.0	
Majority		3,427	100.0	
Turnout		3,427		
Democratic hold		Swing		
