= Jill Oberlander =

American politician (born 1966)

Member-elect of the Connecticut Senate from the 36th district
- Assuming office January 2027
- Succeeding: Ryan Fazio
- Constituency: Greenwich, North Stamford and New Canaan

Personal details
- Born: Jill K. Oberlander; 1966 (age 59–60) New York City, U.S.
- Party: Democratic
- Spouse: Laurence "Larry" Penn (m. 2000)
- Children: 3
- Education: Cornell University (BA, MPA)); University of Chicago (JD)
- Occupation: Attorney, politician

Jill K. Oberlander (/ˈoʊbərˌlændər/; born 1966) is an American attorney and politician who is the Democratic member-elect of the Connecticut Senate from the 36th district encompassing Greenwich, North Stamford and New Canaan. She will succeed incumbent Republican Ryan Fazio and assume office on January 7, 2027.

== Early life and education ==
Oberlander was born 1966 in New York City, the second of three children, to Dr. Samuel Guy Oberlander (1940–2003), an obstetrician-gynecologist, and Marjorie Oberlander (née Kun; 1941–2023), a public school teacher, into a German Jewish family. She has a sister and a brother as well as four half-siblings.

She was raised in Ardsley, New York, where she attended public schools and graduated from Ardsley High School in 1984. She completed a Bachelor of Arts at Cornell University and a Juris Doctor at University of Chicago Law School. In 2023, Oberlander also completed a Master of Public Administration at Cornell.

== Professional career ==
She was an Urban Fellow in the government of New York City, including the Department of Parks and Recreation and Department of Transportation. She is an attorney by profession, with her experience being with the Alliance for Downtown New York, Metropolitan Transportation Authority, and private firms.

== Politics ==
Oberlander served in several public offices in Greenwich, namely the Board of Selectmen, the Representative Town Meeting, and the Board of Estimate and Taxation. She was the Democratic candidate in the 2014 Connecticut House of Representatives election in the 150th district, but lost in the general election Mike Bocchino. She ran for Greenwich first selectman in 2019, but lost to Republican Fred Camillo.

Oberlander ran in the 2026 Connecticut Senate election in the 36th district, which covers northern and western parts of the Connecticut panhandle. Republican Ryan Fazio, who had served as incumbent since flipping back the seat in 2020, had stepped down from the seat to unsuccessfully run in the concurrent gubernatorial election. She cited the United States affordability crisis as a main priority issue for the state, particularly electricity and healthcare, and named her experience in law as an asset. Without any challengers on the ballot, Oberlander won the primary unopposed. She defeated Republican candidate Joe Kelly in the general election.

Oberlander identifies as a centrist, citing bipartisanism as a goal.

== Personal life ==
In 2000, Oberlander married Laurance Eric "Larry" Penn (born 1962), a finance executive, who currently serves as president and CEO of Ellington Financial Inc., based in Greenwich. They have three children as well as a pet dog. She lives in Belle Haven, a neighborhood in Greenwich.
