= El Tour de Tucson =

El Tour de Tucson is a road bicycling event held every November in Tucson, Arizona and was started in 1983 by cyclist and president of the Perimeter Bicycling, Richard DeBernardis. The first El Tour attracted nearly 185 riders, while in recent years, between 7,000 and 10,000 cyclists have attended.

There are several routes of differing lengths, ranging from 32 miles (51 km) to 102 miles (164 km).

El Tour de Tucson is a fundraising ride in the United States. El Tour de Tucson cyclists raise funds for Tu Nidito Children & Family Services, the American Parkinson Disease Association, Water For People, Ben's Bells Project, Big Brothers Big Sisters of America, Diamond Children's Medical Center, the Juvenile Diabetes Research Foundation and the Leukemia & Lymphoma Society. More than 8,000 cyclists participated in the 2008 El Tour de Tucson, raising more than $200,000 for Tu Nidito Children and Family Services.
