= Rob Blanchard =

American politician (born 1980s)

Member-elect of the Connecticut Senate from the 28th district
- Assuming office January 2027
- Succeeding: Tony Hwang

Personal details
- Party: Democratic
- Spouse: Samantha Norton
- Children: 1

Rob Blanchard (born 1987/1988) is an American politician. He is the Democratic member-elect of the Connecticut Senate from the 28th district. Prior to his victory, he served in Middletown Common Council and worked as communications director for Governor Ned Lamont.

== Biography ==
=== Early life and career ===
Rob Blanchard was born in 1987 or 1988, and raised in a suburban household in the Philadelphia metropolitan area. He studied at Syracuse University, where he obtained his bachelor's degree in history. He served in the Veterans Memorial Park Renovation Committee, before joining the Middletown Common Council in November 2015, becoming their youngest member at the time.

Blanchard started working in public relations and government, with his career including chief of staff to state comptroller Sean Scanlon and executive assistant to attorney general George Jepsen. He also chaired the Middletown Democratic Town Committee and campaigned for senator Chris Murphy and governor Dannel Malloy. In 2016, Blanchard was selected as one of the Connecticut Magazine 40 Under 40. In December 2020, while working as deputy spokesperson for Governor Ned Lamont, he and other staffers tested positive for COVID-19, and Lamont's administration briefly went into quarantine. He later served as communications director for Governor Ned Lamont.

=== Political office-holder career ===
In 2023, Blanchard was elected to Fairfield's Representative Town Meeting from District 6. He ran in the 2024 Connecticut Senate election as the Democratic candidate in the 28th district; he lost to Republican incumbent Tony Hwang.

In March 2026, Hwang announced that he would retire as state senator. In April 2026, Blanchard announced that he would run for Hwang's seat in the 2026 Connecticut Senate election, and subsequently resigned from his government position. Blanchard cited the United States affordability crisis as a reason for his run, making affordable housing a priority for his campaign. He defeated Republican candidate Amybeth Laroche in the general election.

=== Personal life ===
Blanchard has a child with his wife Samantha Norton, as well as a pet dog. Originally living in Middletown since 2012, he moved to Fairfield County in the early-2020s and to Newtown in 2026.

In October 2026, Blanchard received a traffic infraction for ignoring a construction pattern, after his car fell into a road hole in a construction zone. Blanchard told the media that the crash was accidental, explaining that he did not notice the zone due to nearby blinding construction lights.
