= M. Adela Eads =

American politician (1920–2003)

President pro tempore of the Connecticut State Senate
- In office 1995–1997
- Preceded by: John B. Larson
- Succeeded by: Kevin B. Sullivan

Member of the Connecticut State Senate from the 30th district
- In office 1981–2000
- Preceded by: Joseph Ruggiero
- Succeeded by: Andrew Roraback

Member of the Connecticut House of Representatives from the 64th district
- In office 1976–1981
- Preceded by: James J. Metro
- Succeeded by: Joseph N. "Joe" Ruwet

Personal details
- Born: March 2, 1920 Brooklyn, New York, U.S.
- Died: July 8, 2003 (aged 83) Kent, Connecticut, U.S.
- Party: Republican

Mary Adela "Dell" Eads (née Diaz; March 2, 1920 – July 8, 2003) was an American politician. She served as a member of the Connecticut House of Representatives for the 64th district from 1976 to 1981 and as a senator in the Connecticut State Senate for the 30th district from 1981 to 2000.

== Early life ==
Eads was born Mary Adela Diaz on March 2, 1920, in Brooklyn, New York. Her parents, Edith Diaz (née Gilmour) and Manuel Diaz, were both immigrants; her mother from Scotland and her father from Spain. She had one brother, Manuel Diaz. She was raised in Pelham Manor, New York, and attended Sweet Briar College in Virginia and the Katherine Gibbs School in New York City.

She began working for U.S. Steel in New York City. She married G. Vernon Eads in 1942 and they had their first son, Manuel Eads, the next year. The couple spent three years in Southbury, Connecticut, before moving to Kent, Connecticut, in 1951. They adopted their second son, Gregory Eads, in 1953. Her husband owned a family-run manufacturing business, G.V. Eads Co, and Eads worked as the company bookkeeper.

She became involved in community service in the 1950s, initially joining the Kent Nursing Association after working as a nurse's aid at Sharon Hospital. She was also a member of the board of her local library and the vestry at her church. She became a member of the Kent Board of Education in 1959, serving as first as the supervisor of transportation and then as the chair for the next twenty-six years. She was also chair of the Region 1 school board for Kent. In the 1970s, she was appointed to the state Board of Education by Governor Thomas Meskill. She held this position until she contested the Connecticut House of Representatives. (Note: The New York Times reported that she was appointed to this position in 1972, whereas the CT Insider reported that she was appointed in 1974.)

== Political career ==
Eads was first elected as a representative for the 64th district in the Connecticut House of Representatives in 1976. She contested the 30th district in the Connecticut State Senate, the largest geographic district in the state, in the 1980 state elections. She ran against the incumbent, Democrat Joseph Ruggiero, and won. She was a member of the judiciary, banking and human services committees and became the chair and ranking member of the education committee. While on the latter committee, she helped pass the Education Enhancement Act of 1986 which raised public school teacher pay. Eads was appointed by Senate president pro tempore, Kevin B. Sullivan, as chairman of the select committee on children. She was the only Republican chairman at the time and was believed to be the only Connecticut representative from a party in the minority to be named as a chairman.

She was elected as the leader of the Senate Republicans in 1991, a position that she held until her retirement. She was challenged in the 1992 election by Democrat Dan Dwyer but she narrowly won by 726 votes of the 41,650 cast. He also contested the 1994 election but Eads retained her seat with a margin of 3,680 votes. Eads became the first woman in the state to be elected president pro tempore for a full term when the Republicans took control of the Senate in 1995. She served as the Senate minority leader from 1997. It is believed that she is the second woman in Connecticut to hold a major leadership position in the state senate, after Florence Finney. She was challenged as the leader of the Senate Republicans in June 1998 by James Fleming and four other members of her Senate leadership team, but she was successfully re-elected as a senator and the party leader with the support of Governor John G. Rowland.

Eads described her legislative priorities as children, education and local issues. During her career, she opposed state taxes on income, capital gains and dividends, and supported low-interest rates for municipal water companies. She focused on keeping the Torrington branch of the University of Connecticut open and established the Office of the Child Advocate in the state. In 1995, she led the passage of the bill nicknamed UConn 2000, which gave the university $1 billion to improve the university. She credited her efforts with including money for a court house in Litchfield County in the state bond proposals and with the decision of the Board of Higher Education to offer four year degrees at the Hartford, Torrington and Waterbury branches of the University of Connecticut. She backed the establishment of CT-N. She expressed that she did not identify as a feminist, although she supported abortion rights and voted in 1999 against a ban on partial-birth abortion.

She retired from the state senate in 2000, when she was succeeded by the Republican Andrew Roraback. She was the longest serving female legislator at the time of her retirement. She received the Prescott Bush Award, the state Republican party's highest honor.

== Later life and legacy ==
Eads suffered from macular degeneration and in late 2001, she was diagnosed with lung cancer. Her husband died the same year at the age of 91. Eads died on July 8, 2003, at Sharon Hospital in Kent. Following her death, Governor Rowland ordered the state flags to half-mast until her interment. In 2016, the board of trustees of the University of Connecticut voted unanimously to rename the Litchfield County Extension Center after Eads. The main building on the former Torrington campus previously bore her name.
