= Senator Wells =

Senator Wells or Welles may refer to:

== Members of the United States Senate ==
- John S. Wells (1803–1860), U.S. Senator from New Hampshire in 1855
- William H. Wells (1769–1829), U.S. Senator from Delaware from 1799 to 1804 and from 1813 to 1817

== United States state senate members ==
- Andy Wells (American politician) (born 1954), North Carolina State Senate
- Charles Wells (American politician) (1786–1866), Massachusetts State Senate
- Erik Wells (born 1967), West Virginia State Senate
- Frank S. Wells (1865–1958), Nebraska State Senate
- Franklin G. Welles (1903–1990), Connecticut State Senate
- George H. Wells (1833–1905), Louisiana State Senate
- Henry Gordon Wells (1879–1954), Massachusetts State Senate
- Henry Jackson Wells (1823–1912), Massachusetts State Senate
- James D. Wells (politician) (1928–2010), Iowa State Senate
- Martin Welles (1787–1863), Connecticut State Senate
- Wellington Wells (1868–1954), Massachusetts State Senate
- William Wells (general) (1837–1892), Vermont State Senate

== Members of the Senate of Canada ==
- David Wells (politician) (born 1962), Canadian senator from Newfoundland and Labrador since 2013
