= Jack Fazzino =

American politician

Jonathan W. Fazzino
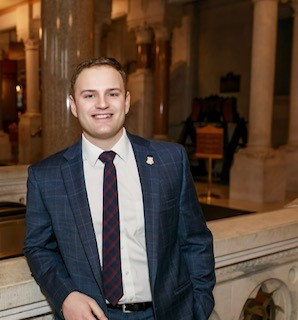
- Representative Fazzino in 2023

Member of the Connecticut House of Representatives from the 83rd district
- Incumbent
- Assumed office January 4, 2023
- Preceded by: Catherine Abercrombie
- Succeeded by: Chad Cardillo (elect)

Personal details
- Born: October 12, 1994 (age 32) New Britain, Connecticut, U.S.
- Party: Democratic
- Education: University of Notre Dame (BA), Georgetown University (MA), Boston College (JD)

Jonathan William "Jack" Fazzino (born October 12, 1994) is an American attorney and politician. Since 2022, he has represented the 83rd district in the Connecticut House of Representatives, which includes parts of Meriden, Berlin, and Cheshire, Connecticut. He is a member of the Democratic Party.

== Early life, education, and career ==
Fazzino is a graduate of New Britain High School. He received his B.A. degree in political science from the University of Notre Dame, his M.A. degree in American government from Georgetown University, and his J.D. from Boston College Law School. While in law school, he completed a summer clerkship with the United States District Court for the District of Massachusetts and performed pro bono legal services for the Boston College Legal Services.

Fazzino is an attorney with Shipman & Goodwin, LLP, a Connecticut-based law firm. He specializes in land use, municipal, appellate, and commercial litigation.

=== Connecticut House of Representatives ===
Fazzino was first elected to public office in 2021 as a town councilor in his hometown of Berlin, Connecticut. As a town councilor, he served on the Town's Ordinance Committee. In 2022, at 28 years old, Fazzino won the 83rd House District seat by a vote of 4,986 to 4,872.

In his first term, he served as an assistant majority leader, focusing on legislation concerning public health and small business administration. In his second term, he served as vice chair of the Judiciary Committee. Notably, he led passage of a landmark workers' compensation bill, adopting one of the most significant legislative reforms in this field since 1993. Fazzino also helped advance legislation protecting immigrant rights, improving roadway safety, streamlining secured commercial transactions, and enhancing penalties for illegal street takeovers.

=== Connecticut State Senate ===
In the 2026 Connecticut Senate election, he ran for the 13th Senate district to represent Meriden, Middletown, Middlefield, and Cheshire. After receiving cross-endorsements from the Democratic and Working Families Party, Fazzino won the Democratic Party Primary and General Election with 63.2% and 86.7% of the vote, respectively.
