= Maria Horn =

American attorney and politician

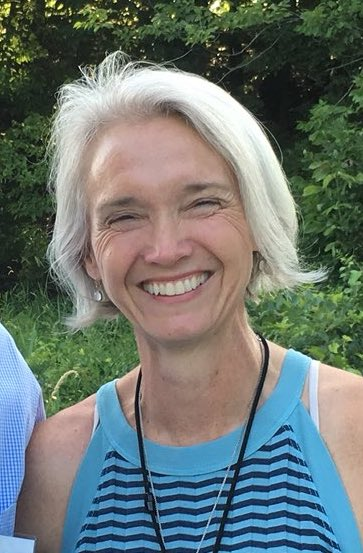
- Maria Horn

Member of the Connecticut House of Representatives from the 64th district
- Incumbent
- Assumed office 2019
- Preceded by: Brian Ohler

Personal details
- Born: 1964 (age 61–62) Ohio, U.S.
- Party: Democratic
- Education: Princeton University (BA); University of Chicago Law School (JD)

Maria Horn (born c. 1964) is an American attorney and politician. A Democrat, she currently represents Connecticut's 64th assembly district in the Connecticut House of Representatives. The district consists of the entire towns of Canaan, Cornwall, Kent, Norfolk, North Canaan, Sharon, Salisbury, Washington and, the southern part of Goshen.

== Early life and career before politics ==
Horn was born in Ohio. She earned a Bachelor of Arts from Princeton University in 1986 and a JD from the University of Chicago Law School in 1993. Prior to serving in the Connecticut legislature, Horn was a federal prosecutor for the Southern District of New York and worked in nonprofits. She also served as board president of Indian Mountain School.

== Politics ==
Horn ran against incumbent Brian Ohler in 2018. She won the election after a recount, winning by 57 votes. Horn was reelected in 2020, when she again narrowly defeated Ohler in the general election.

== Personal life ==
She lives in Salisbury, Connecticut.
