= Connecticut's 83rd House of Representatives district =

American legislative district

Connecticut's 83rd State House of Representatives district
Representative
Jack Fazzino; D

Connecticut's 83rd House of Representatives district elects one member of the Connecticut House of Representatives. It encompasses parts of Meriden, Berlin, and Cheshire and has been represented by Democrat Jack Fazzino since 2023.

== List of representatives ==
List of Representatives from Connecticut's 83rd State House District
Representative	Party	Years	District home	Note
Henry R. Swift	Democratic	1967–1969	Cheshire	Seat created
Paul V. Hayden	Republican	1969–1971	Cheshire	
Richard A. Dice	Republican	1971–1973	Cheshire	
Louis Maleto	Republican	1973–1975	Meriden	
Joseph F. Weigand Jr.	Democratic	1975–1977	Meriden	
John Zajac Jr.	Republican	1977–1993	Meriden	
James A. Tavegia	Republican	1993–1995	Meriden	
James W. Abrams	Democratic	1995–2005	Meriden	
Catherine Abercrombie	Democratic	2005–2023	Meriden	
Jack Fazzino	Democratic	2023–	Berlin	
Chad Cardillo	Democratic	(member-elect) 2027–	Meriden	

== Recent elections ==
=== 2026 ===
2026 Connecticut State House of Representatives election, District 83
Party	Candidate	Votes	%
Democratic	Chad Cardillo	4,823	50.58
Republican	Bob Ham	4,310	45.20
Working Families	Chad Cardillo	240	2.52
Independent Party	Chad Cardillo	162	1.70
Total votes		9,535	100.00
Democratic hold			

=== 2024 ===
2024 Connecticut State House of Representatives election, District 83
Party	Candidate	Votes	%
Democratic	Jack Fazzino	6,281	49.86
Republican	Joseph Vollano	5,703	45.27
Working Families	Jack Fazzino	401	3.18
Independent Party	Jack Fazzino	213	1.69
Total votes		12,598	100.00
Democratic hold			

=== 2022 ===
2022 Connecticut State House of Representatives election, District 83
Party	Candidate	Votes	%
Democratic	Jack Fazzino	4,818	48.87
Republican	Lou Arata	4,766	48.35
Independent Party	Lou Arata	106	1.08
Working Families	Jack Fazzino	168	1.70
Total votes		9,858	100.00
Democratic hold			

=== 2020 ===
2020 Connecticut State House of Representatives election, District 83
Party	Candidate	Votes	%
Democratic	Catherine Abercrombie (incumbent)	6,143	51.40
Republican	Lou Arata	5,556	46.49
Independent Party	Lou Arata	253	2.12
Total votes		11,952	100.00
Democratic hold			

=== 2018 ===
2018 Connecticut House of Representatives election, District 83
Party	Candidate	Votes	%
Democratic	Catherine Abercrombie (Incumbent)	4,765	51.1
Republican	Lou Arata	4,450	47.7
Libertarian	Roger Misbach	117	1.3
Total votes		9,332	100.00
Democratic hold			

=== 2016 ===
2016 Connecticut House of Representatives election, District 83
Party	Candidate	Votes	%
Democratic	Catherine Abercrombie (Incumbent)	5,273	50.81
Republican	Joseph Vollano	5,105	49.19
Total votes		10,378	100.00
Democratic hold			

=== 2014 ===
2014 Connecticut House of Representatives election, District 83
Party	Candidate	Votes	%
Democratic	Catherine Abercrombie (Incumbent)	4,145	56.1
Republican	Pablo Soto	3,243	43.9
Total votes		7,388	100.00
Democratic hold			

=== 2012 ===
2012 Connecticut House of Representatives election, District 83
Party	Candidate	Votes	%
Democratic	Catherine Abercrombie (Incumbent)	6,105	63.9
Republican	Pablo Soto	3,449	36.1
Total votes		7,388	100.00
Democratic hold			
