= Connecticut's 150th House of Representatives district =

American legislative district

Connecticut's 150th State House of Representatives district
Representative
Steve Meskers; D

Connecticut's 150th House of Representatives district elects one member of the Connecticut House of Representatives. It encompasses parts of Greenwich and has been represented by Democrat Steve Meskers since 2019.

== List of representatives ==
Representative	Party	Years	District home	Note
Gennaro W. Frate	Republican	1967 – 1973	Darien	Redistricted to the 141st District
Dorothy Osler	Republican	1973 – 1993	Riverside	
Marilyn Hess	Republican	1993 – 2001	Greenwich	
Lile Gibbons	Republican	2001 – 2013	Greenwich	
Stephen Walko	Republican	2013 – 2015	Greenwich	
Mike Bocchino	Republican	2015 – 2019	Greenwich	
Steve Meskers	Democratic	2019 – present	Old Greenwich	

== Recent Elections ==
=== 2024 ===
Connecticut's 150th House of Representatives district election, 2024
Party	Candidate	Votes	%
Democratic	Steve Meskers (incumbent)	6,378	56.24%
Republican	Paul Cappiali	4,963	43.76%
Total votes		11,341	100.0%

=== 2022 ===
2022 Connecticut State House of Representatives election, 150th District
Party	Candidate	Votes	%
Democratic	Steve Meskers (incumbent)	5,005	58.85
Republican	Ed J. Lopez	3,500	41.15
Total votes		8,505	100.00
Democratic hold			

=== 2020 ===
2020 Connecticut State House of Representatives election, District 150
Party	Candidate	Votes	%
Democratic	Steve Meskers (incumbent)	6,714	54.92
Republican	Joe Kelly	5,225	42.74
Independent Party	Joe Kelly	287	2.35
Total votes		12,226	100.00
Democratic hold			

=== 2018 ===
2018 Connecticut House of Representatives election, District 150
Party	Candidate	Votes	%
Democratic	Steve Meskers	4,859	52.1
Republican	Mike Bocchino	4,464	47.9
Total votes		9,323	100.00
Democratic gain from Republican			

=== 2016 ===
2016 Connecticut House of Representatives election, District 150
Party	Candidate	Votes	%
Republican	Mike Bocchino (Incumbent)	6,769	100.00
Republican hold			

=== 2014 ===
2014 Connecticut House of Representatives election, District 150
Party	Candidate	Votes	%
Republican	Mike Bocchino	3,363	51.9
Democratic	Jill Oberlander	3,119	48.1
Total votes		6,482	100.00
Republican hold			

=== 2012 ===
2012 Connecticut House of Representatives election, District 150
Party	Candidate	Votes	%
Republican	Stephen Walko (Incumbent)	5,345	56.8
Democratic	Stephanie R. Paulmeno	4,067	43.2
Total votes		9,412	100.00
Republican hold			
