= Chad Cardillo =

American politician

Member-elect of the Connecticut House of Representatives from the 83rd district
- Assuming office January 2027
- Succeeding: Jack Fazzino

Personal details
- Party: Democratic
- Website: Campaign website

Chad Cardillo is an American politician. A member of the Democratic Party, he is the member-elect for the 83rd district of the Connecticut House of Representatives.
