= Mark Arneson =

American football player (1949–2023)

No. 57
- Position: Linebacker

Personal information
- Born: September 9, 1949; Iowa City, Iowa, U.S.
- Died: April 14, 2023 (aged 73); Chesterfield, Missouri, U.S.
- Listed height: 6 ft 2 in (1.88 m)
- Listed weight: 220 lb (100 kg)

Career information
- High school: Palo Verde (AZ)
- College: Arizona
- NFL draft: 1972: 2nd round, 32nd overall pick

Career history
- St. Louis Cardinals (1972–1980)

Awards and highlights
- Arizona Wildcats Football Ring of Honor

Career NFL statistics
- Sacks: 17.5
- Interceptions: 5
- Fumble recoveries: 18
- Stats at Pro Football Reference

Mark Edward Arneson (September 9, 1949 – April 14, 2023) was an American professional football player who was a linebacker for the St. Louis Cardinals of the National Football League (NFL). He played college football for the Arizona Wildcats. His brother Jim Arneson followed him into the NFL.

== College career ==
Arneson graduated from the University of Arizona, and was later named to their sports Hall of Fame (1976). Arneson is currently ranked top 10 in two stat lines at the University of Arizona still; 10th in Career Total Tackles (357), 8th in Career Assisted Tackles (171). He led the team in assisted tackles in 1969 and 1970, and led them in unassisted tackles in 1970. He was also a two-time first-team All-WAC selection (1970, 1971).

== Pro career ==
Arneson was selected by the St. Louis Cardinals in the second round of the 1972 NFL draft. He missed only five games during his nine seasons in St. Louis. One of his career highlights came on his birthday in 1979 when he returned a fumble for a touchdown against the New York Giants. Arneson retired after the 1980 season.

== Death ==
Arneson died on April 14, 2023, at the age of 73. He was one of at least 345 NFL players to be diagnosed after death with chronic traumatic encephalopathy (CTE), which is caused by repeated hits to the head.
