= Roberta Willis =

American politician

Member of the Connecticut House of Representatives from the 64th district
- In office January 3, 2001 – January 4, 2017
- Preceded by: Andrew Roraback
- Succeeded by: Brian Ohler

Personal details
- Born: March 6, 1951 (age 75) New York City, New York, U.S.
- Party: Democratic

Roberta Willis (born March 6, 1951) is an American politician who served in the Connecticut House of Representatives from the 64th district from 2001 to 2017.
