= Andrew Repko =

American politician (1909–1995)

Member of the Connecticut House of Representatives from Willington
- In office 1954–1964

Member of the Connecticut Senate from the 35th district
- In office 1967–1969
- Preceded by: Franklin G. Welles
- Succeeded by: Robert D. Houley

Personal details
- Born: October 13, 1909 Yonkers, New York, U.S.
- Died: May 21, 1995 (aged 85)
- Party: Republican
- Children: 2

Andrew Repko (October 13, 1909 – May 21, 1995) was an American politician who served as a Republican member of the Connecticut General Assembly.

He began his legislative career in the Connecticut House of Representatives, representing the town of Willington and later served in the Connecticut State Senate.

== Political career ==
Repko began his legislative career in the Connecticut House of Representatives, representing Willington. He was first elected in 1954 and won successive re-elections in 1956, 1958, 1960, and 1962. During his time in the House, he served on various legislative bodies, including a 1963 committee tasked with studying the potential legalization of horse racing in the state.

In 1966, Repko sought election to the Connecticut State Senate for the 35th district. He received the unanimous endorsement of the Republican Convention in Rockville and went on to defeat Democrat Charles S. Tarpinian with 50.4% of the vote. He served one term from 1967 to 1969. Repko ran for re-election in 1968 but was narrowly defeated by Democrat Robert D. Houley, receiving 49.3% of the vote to Houley's 50.7%. He made another bid for the 35th district seat in 1978 but was defeated by Michael J. Skelley.

== Personal life ==
Repko was born in Yonkers, New York, on October 13, 1909. He was later a resident of West Willington, Connecticut, and was married to Susan, with whom he had two children. He was active in local vocational education initiatives and was recognized for his contributions to the field in the mid-1960s.

Repko died on May 21, 1995, at age 85.
