= Perimeter Bicycling =

- Type: 501(c)3 non-profit, tax exempt organization
- Founded: 1986 (Tucson, Arizona)
- Headquarters: Tucson, Arizona
- Key people: Richard DeBernardis, founder and president
- Website: www.perimeterbicycling.com

Perimeter Bicycling Association of America, Inc. is a 501(c)3 non-profit, tax-exempt organization in Tucson, Arizona, responsible for the production and promotion of four major cycling events: El Tour de Tucson, El Tour de Mesa, Cochise County Cycling Classic and Tour of the Tucson Mountains. Each Perimeter Bicycling event raises funds for non-profit charitable agencies. Other Perimeter Bicycling events include: an annual Bike, Fitness & Health Expo, Indoor El Tour, El Tour Adventure 10k/5k Walk/Run series and Family Fun Rides associated with most events.
Perimeter Bicycling was founded in 1986 by Richard DeBernardis and has helped raise over $32 million for local and national charitable organizations.
