= Cathy Tymniak =

American politician (born 1947)

Member of the Connecticut House of Representatives from the 133rd district
- In office November 1999 – January 3, 2007
- Preceded by: Paul Tymniak
- Succeeded by: Kim Fawcett

Personal details
- Born: August 13, 1947 (age 79) New York City, New York, U.S.
- Party: Republican
- Spouse: Paul Tymniak (died 1999)

Cathy Tymniak (born August 13, 1947) is an American politician who served in the Connecticut House of Representatives from the 133rd district from 1999 to 2007. She was married to politician Paul Tymniak until his death in 1999.
