= Dorothy Osler =

American politician (1923–2003)

Member of the Connecticut House of Representatives from the 150th district
- In office 1973–1993
- Preceded by: Gennaro W. Frate
- Succeeded by: Marilyn Hess

Personal details
- Born: Dorothy Ann Karstaedt; August 19, 1923 Dayton, Ohio, U.S.
- Died: February 21, 2003 (aged 79)
- Party: Republican
- Spouse: David Kohler Osler
- Children: 2
- Education: Miami University

Dorothy Ann "Dottie" Osler (née Karstaedt; August 19, 1923 – February 21, 2003) was an American politician who served in the Connecticut House of Representatives from 1973 to 1993, representing the 150th district.

== Early life and education ==
Osler was born August 19, 1923 in Dayton, Ohio, the second of two daughters, to Carl Milton Karstaedt (1892–1944), a salesman, and Pearl Amelia Karstaedt (née Tobias; 1892–1982). She had a sister, Mary Louise Karstaedt (1917–2006).

She attended Miami University, where she was a member of Alpha Omicron Pi and graduated Phi Beta Kappa.

== Career ==
While living in Connecticut, Osler became active in state and local politics. She served on the Representative Town Meeting of Greenwich from 1970 to 1998, and in October 1998, she was honored by the town with a day in her name and a bench in Binney Park. She served as president of the Connecticut Order of Women Legislators and director of the Connecticut American Association of University Women.

== Personal life ==
In 1953, Osler moved to Greenwich, Connecticut after her husband, David Kohler Osler (1923–2013), a industrial designer, took a position in New York City, residing in Riverside. They had two sons;

- Scott Charles Osler (born 1950), married to Holly A. Drew, formerly of Cincinnati and Boston.
- David Osler (born 1953), married firstly to Mildred "Holly" Halliwell Mower, who was a grandniece of Joseph W. Stilwell, married secondly to Mary Ellen Sydney Ward.

Osler died on February 21, 2003. She was 79.
