= Stephen Walko =

American politician

Member of the Connecticut House of Representatives from the 150th district
- In office January 9, 2013 – January 7, 2015
- Preceded by: Lile Gibbons
- Succeeded by: Mike Bocchino

Personal details
- Party: Republican

Stephen Walko is an American politician who served in the Connecticut House of Representatives from the 150th district from 2013 to 2015.
