= Lile Gibbons =

American politician

Member of the Connecticut House of Representatives from the 150th district
- In office January 3, 2001 – January 9, 2013
- Preceded by: Marilyn Hess
- Succeeded by: Stephen Walko

Personal details
- Born: Lile Muchmore Rasmuson Anchorage, Alaska, U.S.
- Party: Republican
- Relations: Evangeline Atwood (aunt)
- Children: 4
- Parent(s): Elmer E. Rasmuson; Lile Bernard
- Education: Smith College (BA)

Lile Gibbons (née Rasmuson; born October 28, 1942) is an American businesswoman, philanthropist and former politician who served on the Connecticut House of Representatives from the 150th district from 2001 to 2013.

== Early life and education ==
Gibbons was born Lile Muchmore Rasmuson on October 28, 1942, in Anchorage, Alaska, the second of three children, to Elmer E. Rasmuson, a banker, philanthropist and former mayor of Anchorage from 1964 to 1967, and Lile Rasmuson (née Bernard). Her siblings are Edward "Ed" Bernard Rasmuson (1940–2022) and Judy Rasmuson.

Her paternal grandparents were originally from Sweden and immigrated to Yakutat, Alaska (then Alaska Territory) in 1901 respectively 1904, as missionary teachers. Her paternal grandfather, E.A. Rasmuson, who was an attorney, assumed leadership of National Bank of Alaska and rebuilt it into a thriving institution. He would eventually acquire the stocks of the bank and become its majority stockholder. Her maternal family was from Summit, New Jersey.

Gibbons graduated from West Anchorage High School and earned a Bachelor's degree in economics from Smith College.

== Career ==
Prior to her election to the Connecticut State Legislature, Gibbons served in town government and on her board of education. She was elected to the Connecticut House of Representatives in 2000 as a Republican. In February 2012, Gibbons announced she would not seek re-election, and she left office in 2013.

== Personal life ==
She was married August 14, 1965 in Summit, New Jersey, to John Anthony Gibbons II (born 1942), a son of John A. Gibbons of Wilmington, Delaware and Orleans, Massachusetts.

She resides in Greenwich, Connecticut. They have four children and 13 grandchildren.
