= James W. Abrams =

American politician

Member of the Connecticut House of Representatives from the 83rd district
- In office 1995–2005
- Preceded by: James A. Tavegia
- Succeeded by: Catherine Abercrombie

Personal details
- Party: Democratic
- Education: Trinity College; University of Connecticut (JD)

James (Jim) W. Abrams is an American judge and politician. He represented District 83 on the Connecticut House of Representatives from 1995 to 2005. He is a judge on the Connecticut Superior Court.
