= Annette Carter =

American politician (1941–2025)

Member of the Connecticut House of Representatives from the 7th district
- In office 1988–2005
- Preceded by: Carrie Saxon Perry
- Succeeded by: Douglas McCrory

Personal details
- Born: Annette Wheeler; May 24, 1941 Troy, Alabama, U.S.
- Died: January 6, 2025 (aged 83) Hartford, Connecticut, U.S.
- Party: Democratic
- Spouse: Rudolph Carter
- Children: 5
- Parent(s): J. D. and Jewel Wheeler

Annette Wheeler Carter (May 24, 1941 – January 6, 2025) was an American politician from the state of Connecticut. She served as a Democratic member of the Connecticut House of Representatives from 1988 to 2005.

== Life and career ==
Carter was born in Troy, Alabama, on May 24, 1941, the daughter of J. D. and Jewel Wheeler. She married Rudolph Carter, had five daughters, and relocated to Hartford, Connecticut. She became a housing case manager and advocate and earned an associate's degree from the University of Connecticut.

In 1987, State Representative Carrie Saxon Perry was elected Mayor of Hartford, leaving her 7th district seat open. Carter won the Democratic Party endorsement for the seat, and won the January 26, 1988, special election to fill the seat. She was re-elected eight times, rising to assistant majority whip and vice chair of the appropriations committee. In 2004, she lost the Democratic primary to teacher Douglas McCrory. She was a member of the NAACP.

Carter died in Hartford on January 6, 2025, at the age of 83.

== Electoral history ==
=== 1988 ===
==== Special election ====
Connecticut House of Representatives, District 7, January 26, 1988 special election * denotes incumbent Source:
Party	Candidate	Votes	%
Democratic	Annette Carter	614	49.1
Democratic	Roberta L. Jones	292	23.3
Republican	Robert D. Ford	162	12.9
Democratic	Douglas J. Hutchins	112	9.0
Democratic	Troy C. Stewart	71	5.7
Total votes		1,251	100

==== General election ====
Connecticut House of Representatives, District 7, 1988 general election * denotes incumbent Source:
Party	Candidate	Votes	%
Democratic	Annette Carter *	4,031	89.7
Republican	Alana P. Gayle	462	10.3
Total votes		4,493	100

=== 1990 ===
==== General election ====
Connecticut House of Representatives, District 7, 1990 general election * denotes incumbent Source:
Party	Candidate	Votes	%
Democratic	Annette Carter *	2,643	100
Total votes		2,643	100

=== 1992 ===
==== General election ====
Connecticut House of Representatives, District 7, 1992 general election * denotes incumbent Source:
Party	Candidate	Votes	%
Democratic	Annette Carter *	4,950	100
Total votes		4,950	100

=== 1994 ===
==== General election ====
Connecticut House of Representatives, District 7, 1994 general election * denotes incumbent Source:
Party	Candidate	Votes	%
Democratic	Annette Carter *	3,693	100
Total votes		3,693	100

=== 1996 ===
==== General election ====
Connecticut House of Representatives, District 7, 1996 general election * denotes incumbent Source:
Party	Candidate	Votes	%
Democratic	Annette Carter *	4,656	100
Total votes		4,656	100

=== 1998 ===
==== Primary election ====
Connecticut House of Representatives, District 7, 1998 primary election * denotes incumbent Source:
Party	Candidate	Votes	%
Democratic	Annette Carter *	971	59.5
Democratic	Ben J. Dowdell	660	40.5
Total votes		1,631	100

==== General election ====
Connecticut House of Representatives, District 7, 1998 general election * denotes incumbent Source:
Party	Candidate	Votes	%
Democratic	Annette Carter *	3,427	100
Total votes		3,427	100

=== 2000 ===
==== General election ====
Connecticut House of Representatives, District 7, 2000 general election * denotes incumbent Source:
Party	Candidate	Votes	%
Democratic	Annette Carter *	4,829	100
Total votes		4,829	100

=== 2002 ===
==== General election ====
Connecticut House of Representatives, District 7, 2002 general election * denotes incumbent Source:
Party	Candidate	Votes	%
Democratic	Annette Carter *	2,700	92.2
Republican	Alana P. Gayle	227	7.8
Total votes		2,927	100

=== 2004 ===
==== Primary election ====
Connecticut House of Representatives, District 7, 2004 primary election * denotes incumbent Source:
Party	Candidate	Votes	%
Democratic	Douglas McCrory	1,024	68.0
Democratic	Annette Carter *	482	32.0
Total votes		1,506	100
