= Ethan Werstler =

American politician

Member-elect of the Connecticut State Senate from the 35th district
- Assuming office January 2027
- Succeeding: Jeff Gordon

Personal details
- Party: Democratic

Ethan Werstler is an American politician. A member of the Democratic Party, he is the member-elect for the 35th district of the Connecticut State Senate.
