= Mary Ann O'Sullivan =

American politician (born 1942)

Member of the Connecticut House of Representatives from the 64th district
- In office 1993–1995
- Preceded by: Joseph N. Ruwet
- Succeeded by: Andrew Roraback

Personal details
- Born: March 23, 1942 (age 84)
- Party: Democratic

Mary Ann O'Sullivan (born March 23, 1942) is an American politician who served in the Connecticut House of Representatives from 1993 to 1995, representing the 64th district as a Democrat. O'Sullivan unsuccessfully ran for reelection in 1994 and 1996. She lived in Torrington during her tenure and served on the town's board of education from 1986 to 1992.
