= Andrew Roraback =

American politician (born 1960)

Connecticut Superior Court Judge
- Incumbent
- Assumed office April 1, 2013
- Appointed by: Dannel P. Malloy

Connecticut State Senate
- In office 2000–2012
- Preceded by: M. Adela Eads
- Succeeded by: Clark Chapin

Member of the Connecticut House of Representatives from the 64th district
- In office 1994–2000
- Preceded by: Mary Ann O'Sullivan
- Succeeded by: Roberta Willis

Personal details
- Born: Andrew W. Roraback; March 29, 1960 (age 66) Torrington, Connecticut, U.S.
- Party: Republican
- Education: University of Virginia Law School; Yale University; Hotchkiss School
- Profession: Attorney

Andrew W. Roraback (born March 29, 1960) is an American politician from Connecticut. He has served in both the Connecticut House of Representatives and the Connecticut State Senate, representing the Republican Party. As a legislator, he was a social moderate and a fiscal conservative. He never missed a roll call vote during his eighteen years in the General Assembly, earning the nickname "the Cal Ripken of the Senate." He became a judge of the Connecticut Superior Court in 2013.

== Early life ==
Roraback was born in Torrington, Connecticut. His father, Charlie Roraback, is an attorney with Roraback and Roraback, a law firm that was founded by his great-grandfather in 1883. His great-grandfather, Willard Andrew Roraback, was an attorney and a member of the Connecticut House of Representatives. His cousin was attorney Catherine Roraback.

Roraback attended public schools in Torrington and in Litchfield. For high school, he attended the Hotchkiss School, graduating in 1978. He graduated with a B.A. cum laude from Yale University in 1983, where he was a member of the fraternity St. Anthony Hall. In 1987, he earned a J.D. from the University of Virginia Law School.

== Career ==
After law school, Roraback joined the law firm of Wiggin and Dana in New Haven, Connecticut. In 1988, he returned to Torrington to work with his father, his brother Chip, and his sister Margaret as a partner in the family law firm of Roraback and Roraback. This firm specializes in estates, real estate, and trusts.

In 1994, he also became the town attorney for Harwinton, Connecticut. Roraback had to resign from the family law practice when he was appointed to the Connecticut Superior Court in 2013.

In January 2013, Governor Dannel P. Malloy appointed Roraback to an eight-year term as a Connecticut Superior Court Judge. He was confirmed by the General Assembly on March 6 and was sworn into office on April 1, 2013. He starting salary as a judge was $146,780 a year.

Roraback currently serves in the Civil Division of the Waterbury Judicial District. He says, "As a judge, I often now see how legislation I had a hand in crafting plays out in real life. In addition, much of my current work centers on trying to find common ground among parties as they struggle to resolve their disputes. While I do preside over a good number of trials, I find my most satisfying work to be leading parties in conflict to mediated settlements, and my work as a legislator has given me many skills that are helpful in this process."

== Politics ==
=== Connecticut House of Representatives ===
Roraback served in the Connecticut House of Representatives from 1994 to 2000. In 1994, 1996, and 1998, Roraback was elected to represent the 64th Assembly District.

=== Connecticut Senate ===
Roraback served in the Connecticut State Senate from 2000 to 2012 for the 30th Senate District. The 30th district included the communities of Brookfield, Canaan, Cornwall, Goshen, Kent, Litchfield, Morris, New Milford, North Canaan, Salisbury, Sharon, Torrington, Warren, Washington, and Winchester.

In June 2007, Roraback was elected Deputy Minority Leader Pro Tempore and Minority Caucus Chairman. He served on numerous General Assembly committees, including Environment; Executive and Legislative Nominations; Finance, Revenue & Bonding; Judiciary; and Regulation Review. He also was a member of the Speaker’s Task Force on Domestic Violence.

In 2003, he successfully introduced Stephanie's Law, legislation requiring drivers who cause fatal accidents to submit to blood alcohol testing. In 2007, he also authored and successfully legislation to protect victims of domestic violence by allowing police to issue weekend restraining orders. Another law that he supported stopped harming or taking possession of pets in domestic violence restraining orders.

In 2012, Roraback decided to run for the U.S. Congress, rather than to seek reelection to the State Senate.

=== Attorney General campaign ===
In early 2010, Roraback explored running for the office of Attorney General of Connecticut. In April he announced that he would not run. He said campaigning would involve being away from home six days a week, taking him away from his one-year-old son. However, he also said he would be seeking reelection in the State Senate.

=== United States Congress ===
In October 2011, Roraback announced his campaign for Connecticut's 5th congressional district seat in the United States Congress. As the Republican convention approached, he was endorsed by former Governor M. Jodi Rell. Rell decided to speak out when Roraback's opponents "started to try to paint him as some sort of right-wing nut, for lack of a better term, someone who was out of touch, [and an] anti-woman legislator.''

At the congressional district's convention in May 2012, Roraback won the Republican endorsement with 53% of the delegates' votes. Three other Republican contenders—Mark Greenberg, Lisa Wilson-Foley, and Justin Bernier—each received enough votes to require that the party's nominee be the winner of a primary election, which was held on August 14; In the primary, Roraback won 32% of the votes cast, exceeding his nearest opponent by 5 percentage points.

Roraback does not always align with the Republican Party—he supports gay marriage, is pro-choice, and won't commit to no tax increases. As a result, he received endorsements from both sides of the spectrum, including the United States Chamber of Commerce and the Log Cabin Republicans, a gay rights group. He also secured general election endorsements from numerous newspapers across the state, including the Danbury's News-Times, Waterbury's Republican American, the Litchfield County Times, the New Haven Register, and the Housatonic Times.

In the general election, Roraback was narrowly defeated in what has been characterized as an "Obama headwind" by Elizabeth Esty, a Democrat and a one-term member of the Connecticut House of Representatives.

== Professional affiliations ==
Roraback was a member of Governor Jodi Rell's Campaign Finance Reform Working Group. He was also appointed to the Litchfield Board of Ethics from 1990 to 1992.

He is a member of the board of the Torrington Affordable Housing and a member of Torrington Child Care Center. He is a volunteer counsel with Main Street Action Team, Operation Yuli, and Torrington, Connecticut Legal Services.

He participated in the Fleming Fellows Leadership Training at the Center for Policy Alternatives in 1999.

== Awards ==
- Person of the Year, The Register Citizen, 2012
- Distinguished First 100 Male Leader, Connecticut Coalition Against Domestic Violence, 2011
- Children's Champion, Connecticut Early Childhood Alliance, 2009-2010
- Jack Shannahan Prize for Public Service, 2008
- Family Legislator of the Year, Connecticut Council of Family Service Agencies, 2007
- Connecticut Olmstead Award, 2007
- Aspen-Rodel Fellowship in Public Leadership, Aspen Institute, 2006
- In 2005, he was honored by the Connecticut Association of Nonprofits “for his steadfast commitment and service to Connecticut’s nonprofit sector and for making a difference in the lives of the people of Connecticut.”
- Legislator of the Year, Connecticut Farm Bureau Association, 2005
- Environmental Hero, Connecticut League of Conservation Voters, 2004
- Government Leader Against Drunk Driving (GADD), Mothers Against Drunk Driving, 2004
- Environmental Hero, Audubon Connecticut, 2003
- Recognition Award, Connecticut Greenways Council, 2003
- Legislator of the Year, Working Lands Alliance, 2002
- Montgomery Hare Environmental Defender Award, Housatonic Valley Association
- Connecticut Chapter of the National Alliance of the Mentally Ill recognized Roraback for his advocacy on behalf of individuals with psychiatric disabilities.

== Personal life ==
Roraback is married to Kara Dowling. They have a son named Andrew Kevin Roraback who was born around 2009. They lived in Goshen, Connecticut, but later moved to Litchfield by 2019.

He is an Episcopalian. He is a member of the Torrington Historical Society, the Goshen Historical Society, and the Yale Club of Northwestern Connecticut. He served as president of the Litchfield County University Club.

Connecticut House of Representatives
Preceded by Mary Ann O'Sullivan	Member of the Connecticut House of Representatives from the 64th district 1995–2001	Succeeded by Roberta Willis
Connecticut State Senate
Preceded by M. Adela Eads	Member of the Connecticut State Senate from the 30th district 2001–2013	Succeeded by Clark Chapin
