= Joshua M. Hall =

Member of the Connecticut House of Representatives

Member of the Connecticut House of Representatives from the 7th district
- Incumbent
- Assumed office April 28, 2017
- Preceded by: Douglas McCrory

Personal details
- Party: Democratic/Working Families
- Education: Norfolk State University (BA); Central Connecticut State University (MS)
- Profession: Teacher

Joshua Malik Hall is the representative for District 7 of the Connecticut House of Representatives. He was elected in a special election on April 25, 2017. He was elected on the Working Families Party line, but is a registered Democrat and joined the Democratic majority in the Connecticut House.

== Early life, education and career ==
Hall is the former vice president of the Hartford Federation of Teachers and is a former teacher at Weaver High School.

== Elections ==
General Election: 2017 Connecticut's 7th House of Representatives district special election
| Party | Candidate | Votes | % |
|---|---|---|---|
| Working Families | Joshua Hall | 625 | 41.1% |
| Democratic | Rickey Pinckney Sr. | 512 | 33.7% |
| Independent Party | Kenneth Green | 367 | 24.1% |
| Write-In | Giselle Gigi Jacobs | 17 | 1.1% |
| Total votes | | 1,521 | 100.00% |
