= John Zajac Jr. =

American politician (1932–2023)

Member of the Connecticut State Senate from the 13th district
- In office 1971–1974

Member of the Connecticut House of Representatives from the 83rd district
- In office 1977–1993

Personal details
- Born: November 15, 1932 Middlefield, Connecticut, U.S.
- Died: August 28, 2023 (aged 90)
- Party: Republican
- Education: St. Bonaventure University

John Zajac Jr. (November 15, 1932 – August 28, 2023) was an American politician. He served as a Republican member for the 83rd district of the Connecticut House of Representatives. He also served as a member for the 13th district of the Connecticut State Senate.

== Life and career ==
John Zajac Jr. was born in Middlefield, Connecticut, on November 15, 1932. He attended St. Stanislaus Grammar School, Meriden High School and St. Bonaventure University.

In 1970, Zajac was elected to represent the 13th district of the Connecticut State Senate, serving until 1974. In the same year, he ran as a Republican candidate for state treasurer of Connecticut. He placed second in the general election, losing to Henry E. Parker.

In 1976, Zajac was elected to represent the 83rd district of the Connecticut House of Representatives, serving until 1993.

Zajac died on August 28, 2023, at the age of 90.

Party political offices
Preceded by Robert I. Berdon	Republican nominee for Connecticut State Treasurer; 1974	Succeeded by Margaret B. Melady
