= Catherine Abercrombie =

American politician (born 1961)

Member of the Connecticut House of Representatives from the 83rd district
- In office March 2, 2005 – 2022
- Preceded by: Jim Abrams
- Succeeded by: Jack Fazzino

Personal details
- Born: April 28, 1961 (age 65) Meriden, Connecticut, U.S.
- Party: Democratic

Catherine Abercrombie (born April 28, 1961) is an American politician who served as a member of the Connecticut House of Representatives for the 83rd district from 2005 to 2022.
