= Jim Arneson =

American football player (born 1951)

No. 64, 66
- Position: Guard / Center

Personal information
- Born: January 7, 1951 (age 75); Iowa City, Iowa, U.S.
- Listed height: 6 ft 3 in (1.91 m)
- Listed weight: 247 lb (112 kg)

Career information
- High school: Palo Verde (Tucson, Arizona)
- College: Arizona
- NFL draft: 1973: 12th round, 307th overall pick

Career history
- Dallas Cowboys (1973–1974); Cleveland Browns (1975)*; Washington Redskins (1975)
- * Offseason or practice squad member only

Awards and highlights
- All-WAC (1972)

Career NFL statistics
- Games played: 33
- Stats at Pro Football Reference

James Arnold Arneson (born January 7, 1951) is an American former professional football player who was an offensive lineman in the National Football League (NFL) for the Dallas Cowboys and Washington Redskins. He played college football for the Arizona Wildcats and was selected in the 12th round of the 1973 NFL draft.

== Early life ==
Arneson attended Palo Verde High School in Tucson, Arizona, where he was named honorable-mention All-City in 1968.

He accepted a football scholarship from the University of Arizona where he played with his brother Mark Arneson. He began his college career as an offensive tackle before being switched to offensive guard. He received All-WAC honors as a senior.

== Professional career ==
=== Dallas Cowboys ===
Arneson was selected by the Dallas Cowboys in the twelfth round (307th overall) of the 1973 NFL draft. As a rookie, he played mainly on special teams.

In 1974, he appeared in all 14 games, seeing action at guard, center and special teams. He was blocking at guard during the winning drive of Clint Longley come from behind 24-23 victory against the Washington Redskins on Thanksgiving.

In his time with the team he was a backup at the center and guard positions. On September 2, 1975, he was traded to the Cleveland Browns in exchange for a draft choice (not exercised).

=== Cleveland Browns ===
In 1975, he was released by the Cleveland Browns before playing in a game.

=== Washington Redskins ===
On October 31, 1975, he was signed as a free agent by the Washington Redskins. He was released on Sep 4, 1976.

== Personal life ==
After football he worked in building and land development projects. His brother Mark Arneson played linebacker in the NFL for the St. Louis Cardinals.
