= Steve Meskers =

American politician

Stephen Meskers

Member of the Connecticut House of Representatives from the 150th district
- Incumbent
- Assumed office January 9, 2019
- Preceded by: Mike Bocchino

Personal details
- Born: Stephen Robert Meskers; March 7, 1958 (age 68) Greenwich, Connecticut, U.S.
- Party: Democratic
- Spouse: Monica Meskers
- Children: 2
- Education: Fordham University (BA); Pace University (MBA)
- Website: www.stevemeskers.com

Stephen Robert Meskers (born March 7, 1958) is an American politician who is currently serving as the representative from the 150th district in the Connecticut House of Representatives for the Democratic Party since 2019. His district includes part of Greenwich, Connecticut. He is also a member on the Representative Town Meeting (RTM), District 6 in Greenwich.

Meskers was first elected to the seat in 2018, narrowly defeating incumbent Republican Michael Bocchino. Meskers currently serves as the chair of the Commerce Committee, as well as serving on the House's Insurance and Real Estate Committee and Human Services Committee.

== Early life and education ==
Meskers was born March 7, 1958 in Greenwich, Connecticut, the third of five children, to John Hugh Meskers (1925–1992) and Caroline Elvira Meskers (née Pagnucco; 1931–2024). He is of Dutch, Irish and Italian descent. His paternal grandparents were from Holland and Ireland.

He graduated from Fordham University with a Bachelor of Arts in Economics and Spanish in 1980. He then completed his education by graduating from Pace University with a Master of Business Administration.

== Early career ==
From 1983 to 1988, he worked for Irving Trust as an associate attorney before winning elections to the Greenwich RTM and the Connecticut House of Representatives. He later oversaw Bank Santander's division of emerging market sales and fixed income from 1998 - 2010. In the years that followed, he served as the executive director of Emerging Markets at Crédit Agricole from 2010 to 2016 and was director of emerging market fixed income sales with Rencap Securities from 2016 to 2017.

He began his political career when he was elected to the Greenwich RTM in 2002.

== Connecticut House of Representatives ==
=== Elections ===
==== 2018 ====
Meskers was elected to the Connecticut House of Representatives in 2018, narrowly defeating incumbent Republican Michael Bocchino, garnering 52.1% of the vote to Bocchino's 47.9% of the vote.

==== 2020 ====
Meskers was reelected to the Connecticut House of Representatives in 2020 by a likely margin, defeating Republican Joe Kelly with 54.9% to 45.1%.

==== 2022 ====
Meskers was reelected to the Connecticut House of Representatives in 2022, defeating Republican Ed Lopez with 58.8% of the vote to Lopez's 41.2% of the vote.

==== 2024 ====
Meskers was reelected to the Connecticut House of Representatives in 2024 with 56.2% of the vote, defeating Republican challenger Paul Cappiali.

=== Tenure ===
Meskers currently serves as chair of the House's Commerce Committee, and has seats on the Insurance and Real Estate and Human Services Committees.

== Electoral history ==
2022 Connecticut State House of Representatives election, 150th District
Party	Candidate	Votes	%
Democratic	Steve Meskers (incumbent)	5,005	58.85
Republican	Ed J. Lopez	3,500	41.15
Total votes		8,505	100.00
Democratic hold			

2020 Connecticut State House of Representatives election, District 150
Party	Candidate	Votes	%
Democratic	Steve Meskers(incumbent)	6,714	54.92
Republican	Joe Kelly	5,225	42.74
Independent Party	Joe Kelly	287	2.35
Total votes		12,226	100.00
Democratic hold			

2018 Connecticut House of Representatives election, District 150
Party	Candidate	Votes	%
Democratic	Steve Meskers	4,859	52.1
Republican	Mike Bocchino	4,464	47.9
Total votes		9,323	100.00
Democratic gain from Republican			

2022 Connecticut State House of Representatives election, 150th District
Party	Candidate	Votes	%
Democratic	Steve Meskers (incumbent)	5,005	58.85
Republican	Ed J. Lopez	3,500	41.15
Total votes		8,505	100.00
Democratic hold			

== Personal life ==
Meskers lives in Greenwich, Connecticut with his wife Monica Meskers and his three children Christian, Victoria, and Isabel.
