= Thomas G. Carruthers =

American politician (1929–2023)

Member of the Connecticut State Senate from the 35th district
- In office 1973–1975
- Preceded by: Robert D. Houley
- Succeeded by: Robert D. Houley

Personal details
- Born: May 5, 1929 Worcester, Massachusetts, U.S.
- Died: June 6, 2023 (aged 94)
- Party: Republican
- Education: Becker Junior College; University of Hartford

Thomas Gemmell Carruthers (May 5, 1929 – June 6, 2023) was an American politician. He served as a Republican member for the 35th district of the Connecticut State Senate.

== Life and career ==
Carruthers was born in Worcester, Massachusetts. He served in the United States Army Air Corps. He attended Becker Junior and the University of Hartford.

In 1972, Carruthers defeated Michael J. Riley in the general election for the 35th district of the Connecticut State Senate, winning 52 percent of the votes.

Carruthers died on June 6, 2023, at the age of 94.
