= Robert D. Houley =

American politician (1927–2013)

Member of the Connecticut State Senate from the 35th district
- In office 1969–1973
- Preceded by: Andrew Repko
- Succeeded by: Thomas G. Carruthers
- In office 1975–1979
- Preceded by: Thomas G. Carruthers
- Succeeded by: Michael J. Skelley

Personal details
- Born: November 20, 1927
- Died: October 2, 2013 (aged 85)
- Party: Democratic
- Education: University of New Hampshire

Robert D. Houley (November 20, 1927 – October 2, 2013) was an American politician. He served as a Democratic member for the 35th district of the Connecticut State Senate.

== Life and career ==
Houley attended Berlin High School and served in the United States Marine Corps during World War II. After his service, he attended the University of New Hampshire.

Houley served in the Connecticut State Senate from 1969 to 1973 and again from 1975 to 1979.

Houley died on October 2, 2013, from prostate cancer, at the age of 85.
