= Cristin McCarthy Vahey =

American politician

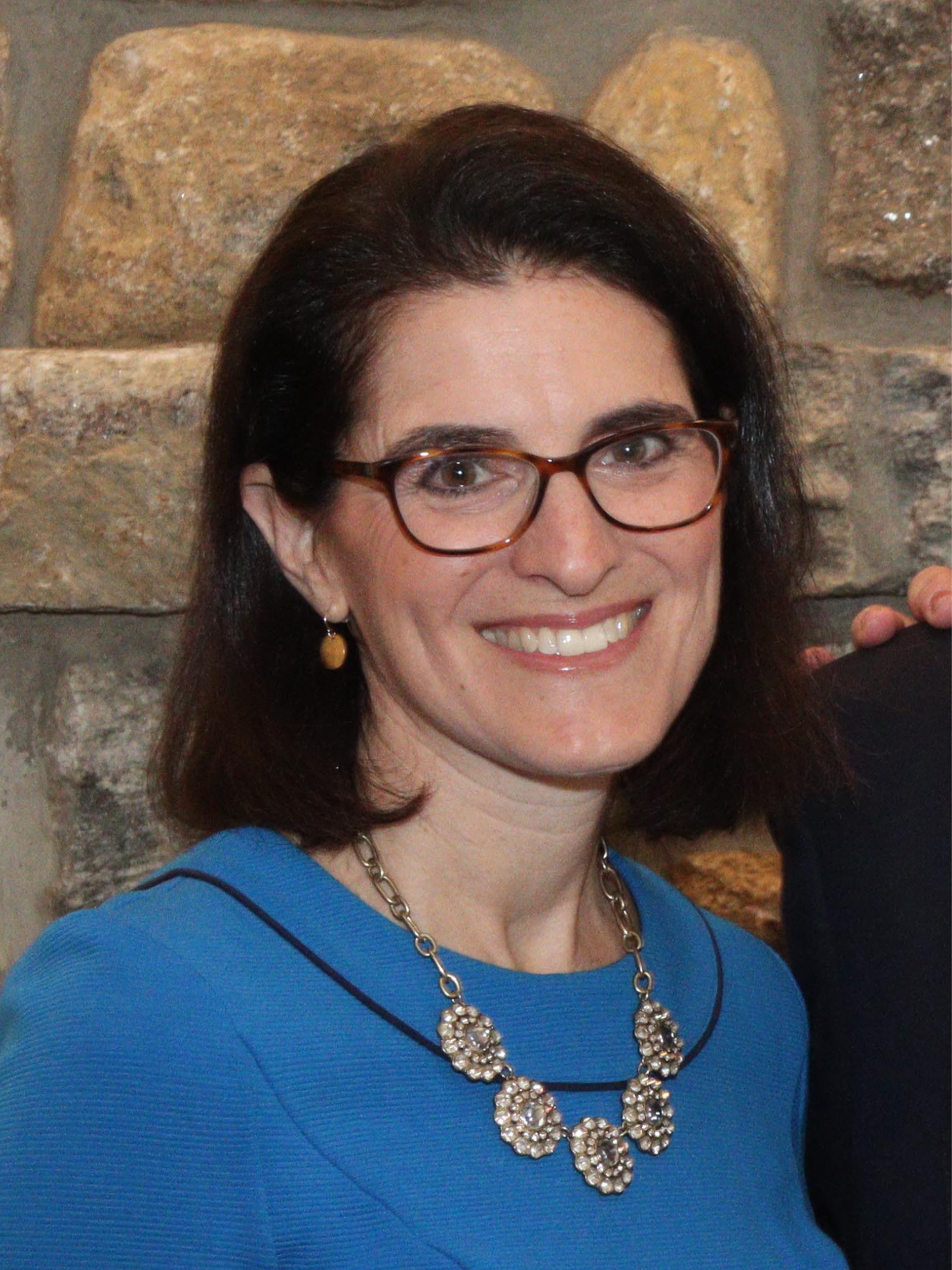
- McCarthy Vahey in 2023

Member of the Connecticut House of Representatives from the 133rd district
- Incumbent
- Assumed office January 7, 2015
- Preceded by: Kim Fawcett

Personal details
- Born: Cristin McCarthy West Chester, Pennsylvania, U.S.
- Party: Democratic
- Spouse: Brian Vahey
- Children: 3
- Education: University of Notre Dame (BA); University of Washington (MSW)

Cristin McCarthy Vahey is an American politician serving as a member of the Connecticut House of Representatives from the 133rd district. Elected in November 2014, she assumed office on January 7, 2015.

== Early life and education ==
McCarthy Vahey was born in West Chester, Pennsylvania. She earned a Bachelor of Arts degree in economics and government from the University of Notre Dame and a Master of Social Work from the University of Washington School of Social Work.

== Career ==
McCarthy Vahey began her career as a social worker. She was elected to the Connecticut House of Representatives in November 2014 and assumed office on January 7, 2015. Since 2019, she has served as co-chair of the House Planning and Development Committee.

== Personal life ==
McCarthy Vahey and her husband, Brian Vahey, live in Fairfield, Connecticut and have three children.
