= Marilyn Hess =

American politician (born 1939)

Member of the Connecticut House of Representatives from the 150th district
- In office 1993–2001
- Preceded by: Dorothy Osler
- Succeeded by: Lile Gibbons

Personal details
- Born: October 20, 1939 (age 86) Chicago, Illinois, U.S.
- Party: Republican
- Spouse: Dennis Hess
- Children: 2
- Education: New York University (BBA); Pace University (AAS)

Marilyn Ann Hess (born October 20, 1939) is an American politician who served in the Connecticut House of Representatives from 1993 to 2001, representing the 150th district as a Republican.

== Career ==
Hess was born in Chicago, Illinois. She attended New York University and Pace University.

In 1979, Hess became active in Connecticut politics, serving on Greenwich's Republican Town Committee and its Planning and Zoning Commission. She was first elected to the Connecticut House of Representatives in 1993 and served four terms. She did not run for reelection in 2000 and was succeeded by Lile Gibbons.
