= Connecticut's 64th House of Representatives district =

American legislative district

Connecticut's 64th State House of Representatives district
Representative
| Maria Horn; D |

Connecticut's 64th House of Representatives district elects one member of the Connecticut House of Representatives. Its current representative is Democrat Maria Horn. The district consists of the entire towns of Canaan, Cornwall, Kent, Norfolk, North Canaan, Sharon, and Salisbury, the southern part of Goshen, and much of the city of Torrington.

== List of representatives ==
| Representative | Party | Years | District home | Note |
|---|---|---|---|---|
| Howard E. Crouch | Republican | 1967 – 1973 | Stonington | Redistricted to the 43rd District |
| Gordon M. Vaill | Republican | 1973 – 1975 | Goshen | Redistricted from the 173rd District |
| James J. Metro | Democratic | 1975 – 1977 | Sharon | |
| M. Adela Eads | Republican | 1977 – 1981 | Kent | Later served as a Connecticut State Senator and Presidents pro tempore of the Connecticut Senate |
| Joseph N. "Joe" Ruwet | Republican | 1981 – 1993 | Torrington | |
| Mary Ann O'Sullivan | Democratic | 1993 – 1995 | Torrington | |
| Andrew Roraback | Republican | 1995 – 2001 | Goshen | Later served as a Connecticut State Senator and a Judge on the Connecticut Superior Court |
| Roberta Willis | Democratic | 2001 – 2017 | Salisbury | |
| Brian Ohler | Republican | 2017 – 2019 | North Canaan | |
| Maria Horn | Democratic | 2019 – present | Salisbury | |

== Recent elections ==
State Election 2010: House District 64
| Party | Candidate | Votes | % | ±% |
|---|---|---|---|---|
| Democratic | Roberta Willis | 4,382 | 49.7 | −37.4 |
| Republican | Katherine Lauretano | 4,228 | 48.0 | +48.0 |
| Working Families | Roberta Willis | 205 | 2.3 | −10.6 |
| Majority | | 359 | 4.1 | −95.9 |
| Turnout | | 8,815 | | |
| Democratic hold | | Swing | -48.0 | |

State Election 2008: House District 64
| Party | Candidate | Votes | % | ±% |
|---|---|---|---|---|
| Democratic | Roberta Willis | 8,293 | 87.1 | +19.4 |
| Working Families | Roberta Willis | 1,231 | 12.9 | +12.9 |
| Majority | | 9,524 | 100.0 | +64.7 |
| Turnout | | 9,524 | | |
| Democratic hold | | Swing | +15.7 | |

State Election 2006: House District 64
| Party | Candidate | Votes | % | ±% |
|---|---|---|---|---|
| Democratic | Roberta Willis | 6,603 | 67.7 | +8.3 |
| Republican | Nancy Sieller | 3,154 | 32.3 | −8.3 |
| Majority | | 3,449 | 35.3 | +16.5 |
| Turnout | | 9,757 | | |
| Democratic hold | | Swing | +8.3 | |

State Election 2004: House District 64
| Party | Candidate | Votes | % | ±% |
|---|---|---|---|---|
| Democratic | Roberta Willis | 7,147 | 59.4 | +3.7 |
| Republican | Michael D. Lynch | 4,883 | 40.6 | −3.7 |
| Majority | | 2,264 | 18.8 | +7.5 |
| Turnout | | 12,030 | | |
| Democratic hold | | Swing | +3.7 | |

State Election 2002: House District 64
| Party | Candidate | Votes | % | ±% |
|---|---|---|---|---|
| Democratic | Roberta Willis | 4,943 | 55.7 | +3.9 |
| Republican | John Morris | 3,937 | 44.3 | −3.9 |
| Majority | | 1,006 | 11.3 | +5.7 |
| Turnout | | 8,880 | | |
| Democratic hold | | Swing | +3.9 | |

State Election 2000: House District 64
| Party | Candidate | Votes | % | ±% |
|---|---|---|---|---|
| Democratic | Roberta Willis | 5,833 | 52.8 | +52.8 |
| Republican | John Morris | 5,213 | 47.2 | −52.8 |
| Majority | | 620 | 5.6 | −94.4 |
| Turnout | | 11,046 | | |
| Democratic gain from Republican | | Swing | +52.8 | |

State Election 1998: House District 64
| Party | Candidate | Votes | % | ±% |
|---|---|---|---|---|
| Republican | Andrew Roraback | 6,326 | 100.0 | +39.9 |
| Majority | | 6,326 | 100.0 | +80.0 |
| Turnout | | 6,326 | | |
| Republican hold | | Swing | +39.9 | |

State Election 1996: House District 64
| Party | Candidate | Votes | % | ±% |
|---|---|---|---|---|
| Republican | Andrew Roraback | 6,616 | 60.1 | +9.3 |
| Democratic | Mary Ann O'Sullivan | 4,091 | 37.1 | +5.7 |
| A Connecticut Party (1990) | Mary Ann O'Sullivan | 320 | 2.8 | −15.0 |
| Majority | | 2,205 | 20.0 | +18.4 |
| Turnout | | 11,017 | | |
| Republican hold | | Swing | +9.3 | |

State Election 1994: House District 64
| Party | Candidate | Votes | % | ±% |
|---|---|---|---|---|
| Republican | Andrew Roraback | 4,820 | 50.8 | −2.3 |
| Democratic | Mary Ann O'Sullivan | 2,975 | 31.4 | +8.3 |
| A Connecticut Party (1990) | Mary Ann O'Sullivan | 1,693 | 17.8 | −6.0 |
| Majority | | 153 | 1.6 | −27.6 |
| Turnout | | 9,488 | | |
| Republican hold | | Swing | -2.3 | |

State Election 1992: House District 64
| Party | Candidate | Votes | % | ±% |
|---|---|---|---|---|
| Republican | Robert A. Maddox, Jr. | 6,060 | 53.1 | |
| A Connecticut Party (1990) | Sandra G. Carpenter | 2,717 | 23.8 | |
| Democratic | Audrey B. Blondin | 2,643 | 23.1 | |
| Majority | | 3,343 | 29.2 | |
| Turnout | | 11,420 | | |
| Republican hold | | Swing | | |
