= Connecticut's 133rd House of Representatives district =

American legislative district

Connecticut's 133rd State House of Representatives district
Representative
Cristin McCarthy Vahey; D

Connecticut's 133rd House of Representatives district elects one member of the Connecticut House of Representatives. It encompasses parts of Fairfield and Bridgeport and has been represented by Democrat Cristin McCarthy Vahey since 2015.

== List of representatives ==
List of Representatives from Connecticut's 133rd State House District
Representative	Party	Years	District home	Note
John P. Maiocco Jr.	Democratic	1967–1973	Bridgeport	Seat created
Elinor F. Wilber	Republican	1973–1993	Fairfield	
Gene Gavin	Republican	1993–1995	Westport	
Paul Tymniak	Republican	1995–1999	Fairfield	
Cathy Tymniak	Republican	1999–2007	Fairfield	
Kim Fawcett	Democratic	2007–2015	Fairfield	
Cristin McCarthy Vahey	Democratic	2015–Present	Fairfield	

== Recent elections ==
=== 2020 ===
2020 Connecticut State House of Representatives election, District 133
Party	Candidate	Votes	%
Democratic	Cristin McCarthy Vahey (incumbent)	7,581	62.65
Republican	Joanne Romano-Csonka	4,056	33.52
Working Families	Cristin McCarthy Vahey (incumbent)	287	2.37
Independent Party	Joanne Romano-Csonka	177	1.46
Total votes		12,101	100.00
Democratic hold			

=== 2018 ===
2018 Connecticut House of Representatives election, District 133
Party	Candidate	Votes	%
Democratic	Cristin McCarthy Vahey (Incumbent)	6,081	63.8
Republican	Sally Connolly	3,444	36.2
Total votes		9,525	100.00
Democratic hold			

=== 2016 ===
2016 Connecticut House of Representatives election, District 133
Party	Candidate	Votes	%
Democratic	Cristin McCarthy Vahey (Incumbent)	6,402	59.11
Republican	Raymond Neuberger	4,428	40.89
Total votes		10,830	100.00
Democratic hold			

=== 2014 ===
2014 Connecticut House of Representatives election, District 133
Party	Candidate	Votes	%
Democratic	Cristin McCarthy Vahey	3,827	56.2
Republican	Carol Way	2,711	39.8
Working Families	Christin McCarthy Vahey	276	4.1
Total votes		10,830	100.00
Democratic hold			

=== 2012 ===
2012 Connecticut House of Representatives election, District 133
Party	Candidate	Votes	%
Democratic	Kim Fawcett (Incumbent)	5,982	61.9
Republican	Carol Way	3,673	38.1
Total votes		9,655	100.00
Democratic hold			
