= Stephen Harding (politician) =

American politician (born 1987)

Minority Leader of the Connecticut State Senate
- Incumbent
- Assumed office February 16, 2024
- Preceded by: Kevin Kelly

Member of the Connecticut State Senate from the 30th district
- Incumbent
- Assumed office January 4, 2023
- Preceded by: Craig Miner

Member of the Connecticut House of Representatives from the 107th district
- In office February 25, 2015 – January 4, 2023
- Preceded by: David Scribner
- Succeeded by: Martin Foncello

Personal details
- Born: 1987 (age 38–39) New York City, New York, U.S.
- Party: Republican
- Education: Albertus Magnus College (BA); New York Law School (JD)
- Website: State Senate website

Stephen G. Harding Jr. (born July 1987) is an attorney and American politician from the state of Connecticut. He is the senator for the 30th Senate District and is a member of the Republican Party. Since February 2024, he has served as Senate Minority Leader. He is currently serving his second term, and was first elected in November 2022.

== Biography ==
Harding was elected to represent the 107th district of the Connecticut House of Representatives in a special election in 2015. He was also elected to the Brookfield Board of Education the same year. He attended Albertus Magnus College and received a Juris Doctor degree from New York Law School. He was elected to represent the 30th district of the Connecticut State Senate in 2022. Harding has made cost of living a major component of his political platform when campaigning. As of his election to the Connecticut State Senate, he was a resident of Brookfield, Connecticut.

Harding was elected Senate Minority Leader in February 2024 after his predecessor, Kevin Kelly, resigned. Harding lost his bid for reelection to the Senate in 2026 to Democrat Aaron Zimmer.

Connecticut State Senate
Preceded by Kevin Kelly	Minority Leader of the Connecticut State Senate; 2024–present	Incumbent
