= Douglas McCrory =

American politician

Member of the Connecticut State Senate from the 2nd district
- Incumbent
- Assumed office February 2017
- Preceded by: Eric D. Coleman

Member of the Connecticut House of Representatives from the 7th district
- In office January 12, 2005 – February 2017
- Preceded by: Annette Carter
- Succeeded by: Joshua M. Hall

Personal details
- Born: Hartford, Connecticut
- Party: Democratic
- Spouse: Foye Smith
- Education: University of Hartford (BA); Sacred Heart University (MA)
- Profession: Vice Principal, Teacher

Douglas M. McCrory is a Democratic member of the Connecticut State Senate. He has served the 2nd district, which includes northern Hartford, Bloomfield, and Windsor since 2017. Before his election to the Senate, McCrory served as a member of the Connecticut House of Representatives from 2005 to 2017 and as a Democratic Town Committee Member in the 7th District beginning in 2002.

== Early life and education ==
A Hartford native, McCrory earned a basketball scholarship to his hometown University of Hartford in 1988. There, he obtained his bachelor's degree. A few miles down the road, in Fairfield, Connecticut, he went on to attain an MA in elementary administration before returning to his previous alma mater to attain a second MA in business administration.

== Career ==
Representative McCrory began his career in education at Sarah J. Rawson Elementary School in Hartford. He continued to teach but eventually became an administrator at Lewis Fox Middle School and ultimately for the Capitol Region Education Council. He continues in this capacity to this day.

Aside from his work as teacher and administrator, McCrory has also cofounded the Benjamin E. Mays Institute, which uses curriculum infused with African-American history and themes to create a positive self-image. McCrory also coaches young people in Hartford's Northend Little League, the Hartford Hurricanes and the Boys & Girls Club.

== Connecticut House of Representatives ==
During his tenure in the House, McCrory received endorsements from the Hartford Courant and the American Federation of State, County and Municipal Employees.

McCrory cosponsored bills increasing the minimum wage, mandating sick leave, and authorizing people to record police officers among others.

== 2nd Senate District special election, 2017 ==
Minutes before the commencement of the 2017 legislative session, state Senator Eric Coleman resigned to begin the Judicial Selection Commission process required of a Connecticut Supreme Court Justice. His seat newly vacant, Governor Dan Malloy called for a special election to take place on February 28. Three days before this announcement had been made official, local Democrats met to nominate their candidate. While both Town Committee Chairman received 30 out of 37 votes from Windsor and Suggs, McCrory overcame that margin with 31 of 34 from Hartford.

Although both the 2nd and 32nd Senate districts are considered respectively safe blue and red seats, each election saw more attention than usual due to the composition of the Connecticut Senate as a result of the election: 18 Democrats, 18 Republicans and a tie-breaking vote by Lieutenant Governor Nancy Wyman. Any upset could tip the balance of power in the upper chamber.

His opponents were Republican Michael McDonald, a former Windsor town council member, and Aaron Romano, progressive former Democrat and Bloomfield attorney, who ran as an unaffiliated write-in candidate. Another special election will be called by Governor Malloy to fill his now vacant seat.

== Electoral history ==
Connecticut's 7th House District election, 2004
Primary election
Party	Candidate	Votes	%
Democratic	Douglas McCrory	1,024	68.0
Democratic	Annette Carter	482	32.0
General election
Democratic	Douglas McCrory	4,210	100
Republican	Jacqueline Dickens	0	0

Connecticut's 7th House District election, 2006
Party	Candidate	Votes	%
Democratic	Douglas McCrory	2,550	93.5
Republican	Jacqueline Dickens	178	6.5

McCrory was unopposed in both the primary and general elections in 2008.

Connecticut's 7th House District election, 2010
Primary election
Party	Candidate	Votes	%
Democratic	Douglas McCrory	947	66.8
Democratic	R.J. Winch	471	33.2
General election
Democratic	Douglas McCrory	3,340	100

Connecticut's 7th House District election, 2012
Party	Candidate	Votes	%
Democratic	Douglas McCrory	6,237	97.1
Republican	Colleen Rankine	188	2.9

Connecticut's 7th House District election, 2014
Primary election
Party	Candidate	Votes	%
Democratic	Douglas McCrory	948	80
Democratic	Donna Thompson-Daniel	237	20
General election
Democratic	Douglas McCrory	3,593	96.7
Nonpartisan	Donna Thompson-Daniel	113	3.3

McCrory was unopposed in both the primary and general elections in 2016.

Connecticut's 2nd Senate District special election, 2017
Party	Candidate	Votes	%
Democratic	Douglas McCrory	7,034	74.1
Republican	Michael McDonald	2,401	25.3

== Personal life ==
McCrory lives in the Blue Hills neighborhood of Hartford with his wife, a public defender, and children. They attend the Bethel African Methodist Episcopal Church in Bloomfield, Connecticut, where he was awarded Man of the Year in 2002.
