= Aaron Zimmer =

American politician

Member of the Connecticut Senate from the 30th district
- Member-elect
- Assumed office January 2027
- Preceded by: Stephen Harding

Personal details
- Born: Lincoln, Nebraska
- Party: Democratic
- Website: Official website

Aaron Zimmer is an American politician. A member of the Democratic Party, he was elected to the Connecticut State Senate in 2026, representing the 30th district. Zimmer unseated Republican Stephen Harding, the Senate Minority Leader, in the 2026 election, flipping a seat held by Republicans since 1981. He previously ran for a seat in the Connecticut House of Representatives in 2024.

Zimmer was born and raised in Lincoln, Nebraska. He worked as a musician and moved to New York City in 2003, where he founded a recording studio and a record label. Following the outbreak of the COVID-19 pandemic, Zimmer moved his family to Brookfield, Connecticut.
