= Connecticut's 2nd State Senate district =

American legislative district

Senator
Douglas McCrory; D

Connecticut's 2nd State Senate district elects one member of the Connecticut State Senate. The district consists of parts of Bloomfield, Hartford, and Windsor. It is currently represented by Democrat Douglas McCrory, who has served since 2017.

== Recent elections ==
=== 2026 General Election ===
2026 Connecticut State Senate election, District 2
Party	Candidate	Votes	%
Democratic	TBD	TBD	TBD
Republican	Tim Knotts	TBD	TBD
	Total Votes	TBD	TBD
Results: TBD	Winner: TBD	TBD	TBD

=== 2026 Democratic Primary ===
2026 Connecticut State Senate Democratic Primary, District 2
Party	Candidate	Votes	%
Democratic	Douglas McCrory (Incumbent)	2,255	26.07%
Democratic (DSA-aligned)	Maryam Khan	3,521	40.71%
Democratic	Ayana Taylor	2,874	33.23%
	Total Votes	8,650	100.0%
Results: TBD	Winner: Maryam Khan	3,521	40.71%

=== 2024 General Election ===
2024 Connecticut State Senate election, District 2
Party	Candidate	Votes	%
Democratic	Douglas McCrory (Incumbent)	30,086	82.4
Republican	Kristin Hoffmann	6,411	17.6
	Total Votes	36,497	100.0
Democratic Hold	Winner: Douglas McCrory (Incumbent)	30,086	82.4

=== 2024 Democratic Primary ===
2024 Connecticut State Senate Democratic Primary, District 2
Party	Candidate	Votes	%
Democratic	Douglas McCrory (Incumbent)	3,673	59.6
Democratic	Ayana Taylor	1,965	31.9
Democratic	Shellye Davis	525	8.5
	Total Votes	6,163	100.0
Democratic Hold	Winner: Douglas McCrory (Incumbent)	3,673	59.6

=== 2022 ===
2022 Connecticut State Senate election District 2
Party	Candidate	Votes	%
Democratic	Douglas McCrory (Incumbent) Unopposed*	21,101	100.0
	Total Votes	21,101	100.0
Democratic Hold	Winner: Douglas McCrory (Incumbent)	21,101	100.0

=== 2020 ===
2020 Connecticut State Senate election, District 2
Party	Candidate	Votes	%
Democratic	Douglas McCrory (incumbent)	33,839	100.00
Democratic hold			

=== 2018 ===
2018 Connecticut State Senate election, District 2
Party	Candidate	Votes	%
Democratic	Douglas McCrory (incumbent)	26,542	100.0
Total votes		26,542	100.0
Democratic hold			

=== 2017 special election ===
2017 District 2 Special Election
Party	Candidate	Votes	%
Democratic	Douglas McCrory (incumbent)	7,034	71.8
Republican	Michael McDonald	2,401	24.5
Write-In		368	3.8
Total votes		9,803	100.0
Democratic hold			

=== 2016 ===
2016 Connecticut State Senate Election, District 2
Party	Candidate	Votes	%
Democratic	Eric D. Coleman (incumbent)	30,772	83.94
Republican	Theresa Tillett	5,888	16.06
Total votes		36,660	100.0
Democratic hold			

=== 2014 ===
2014 Connecticut State Senate Election, District 2
Party	Candidate	Votes	%
Democratic	Eric D. Coleman (incumbent)	20,129	81.7
Republican	Theresa Tillett	4,507	18.3
Total votes		24,636	100.0
Democratic hold			

=== 2012 ===
2012 Connecticut State Senate Election, District 2
Party	Candidate	Votes	%
Democratic	Eric D. Coleman (incumbent)	31,114	85.5
Republican	Malvi Garcia Lennon	5,276	14.5
Total votes		36,390	100.0
Democratic hold			
