= Connecticut's 30th State Senate district =

American legislative district

Senator
Stephen Harding; R

Connecticut's 30th State Senate district elects one member of the Connecticut State Senate. It consists of the towns of Brookfield, Canaan, Cornwall, Goshen, Kent, Litchfield, Morris, New Milford, North Canaan, Salisbury, Sharon, Winchester, Warren and part of Torrington. It has been represented by Republican Stephen Harding since 2023.

== List of senators ==
Senators	Party	Years	District home	Note
John A. Minetto	Republican	1961–1971	Torrington	
P. Edmund Power	Republican	1971–1975	Torrington	
Harold D. Hansen	Democratic	1975–1977	Sherman	
John A. Gawrych	Republican	1977–1979	Torrington	
Joseph A. Ruggiero	Democratic	1979–1981	Litchfield	
M. Adela Eads	Republican	1981–2001	Kent	Later served as Presidents pro tempore of the Connecticut Senate
Andrew Roraback	Republican	2001–2013	Goshen	Later served as a Judge on the Connecticut Superior Court
Clark Chapin	Republican	2013–2017	New Milford	
Craig Miner	Republican	2017–2023	Litchfield	
Stephen Harding	Republican	2023–2027	Brookfield	Republican Minority Leader from 2024-2027
Aaron Zimmer	Democratic	2027–	Brookfield	

== Election results ==
=== 2020 ===
2020 Connecticut State Senate election, District 30
Party	Candidate	Votes	%
Republican	Craig Miner (incumbent)	28,719	53.40
Democratic	David Gronbach	24,158	44.90
Independent Party	Joseph Bongiorno	937	1.70
Total votes		53,814	100.00
Republican hold			

=== 2018 ===
2018 Connecticut State Senate election, District 30
Party	Candidate	Votes	%
Total	Craig Miner (incumbent)	23,121	53.6
Republican	Craig Miner	22,068	51.2
Independent	Craig Miner	1,053	2.4
Total	David Lawson	20,011	46.4
Democratic	David Lawson	19,039	44.1
Working Families	David Lawson	972	2.3
Total votes		43,132	100.0
Republican hold			

=== 2016 ===
2016 Connecticut State Senate election, District 30
Party	Candidate	Votes	%
Republican	Craig Miner	26,676	55.9
Democratic	David Lawson	21,042	44.1
Total votes		47,718	100.0
Republican hold			

=== 2014 ===
2014 Connecticut State Senate election, District 30
Party	Candidate	Votes	%
Total	Clark Chapin	19,242	60.4
Republican	Clark Chapin	17,744	55.9
Independent Party	Clark Chapin	1,498	4.5
Democratic	William O. Riiska	13,749	41.7
Total votes		32,991	100.0
Republican hold			

=== 2012 ===
2012 Connecticut State Senate election, District 30
Party	Candidate	Votes	%
Republican	Clark Chapin	23,712	54.9
Democratic	William O. Riiska	19,474	45.1
Total votes		43,186	100.0
Republican hold			
