= Connecticut's 28th State Senate district =

American legislative district

Senator
Tony Hwang; R

Connecticut's 28th State Senate district elects one member of the Connecticut State Senate. It consists of the towns of Fairfield, Easton, Newtown, and parts of Westport and Weston. It has been represented by Republican Tony Hwang since 2015.

== Recent elections ==
=== 2020 ===
2020 Connecticut State Senate election, District 28
Party	Candidate	Votes	%
Democratic	Michelle Lapine McCabe	29,759	48.30
Republican	Tony Hwang (incumbent)	31,857	51.70
Total votes		61,616	100.00
Republican hold			

=== 2018 ===
2018 Connecticut State Senate election, District 30
Party	Candidate	Votes	%
Total	Tony Hwang (incumbent)	25,277	52.0
Republican	Tony Hwang	24,105	49.6
Independent	Tony Hwang	1,172	2.4
Total	Michelle Lapine McCabe	23,336	48.0
Democratic	Michelle Lapine McCabe	22,610	46.5
Working Families	Michelle Lapine McCabe	726	1.5
Total votes		48,613	100.0
Republican hold			

=== 2016 ===
2016 Connecticut State Senate election, District 28
Party	Candidate	Votes	%
Republican	Tony Hwang (incumbent)	32,659	60.37
Democratic	Phillip Dwyer	21,441	39.63
Total votes		54,100	100.00
Republican hold			

=== 2014 ===
2018 Connecticut State Senate election, District 30
Party	Candidate	Votes	%
Republican	Tony Hwang	19,428	53.3
Independent	Tony Hwang	1,053	2.9
Democratic	Kim Fawcett	15,121	41.5
Working Families	Kim Fawcett	840	2.3
Total votes		48,613	100.0
Republican hold			

=== 2012 ===
2012 Connecticut State Senate election, District 28
Party	Candidate	Votes	%
Republican	John P. McKinney (incumbent)	33,368	100.00
Total votes		33,368	100.00
Republican hold			
