= Mike Bocchino =

American politician

Member of the Connecticut House of Representatives from the 150th district
- In office January 7, 2015 – January 9, 2019
- Preceded by: Stephen Walko
- Succeeded by: Steve Meskers

Personal details
- Born: Mike Bocchino; July 24, 1971 (age 55) Greenwich, Connecticut, U.S.
- Party: Republican

Mike Bocchino (born July 24, 1971) is an American politician who served in the Connecticut House of Representatives from the 150th district from 2015 to 2019.
