= Paul Tymniak =

American politician

Member of the Connecticut House of Representatives from the 133rd district
- In office January 4, 1995 – July 28, 1999
- Preceded by: Gene Gavin
- Succeeded by: Cathy Tymniak

Personal details
- Born: April 11, 1945 Bridgeport, Connecticut
- Died: July 28, 1999 (aged 54) Greenwich, Connecticut
- Party: Republican
- Spouse: Cathy Tymniak

Paul Tymniak (April 11, 1945 – July 28, 1999) was an American politician who served in the Connecticut House of Representatives from the 133rd district from 1995 until his death in 1999.

He died of stomach cancer on July 28, 1999, in Greenwich, Connecticut at age 54.
