= Tu Nidito =

Non-profit agency in Tucson, Arizona

- Founded: 1996
- Purpose: "Tu Nidito Children and Family Services provides comfort, hope and support for children and families whose lives have been impacted by a serious medical condition or death."
- Location: Tucson, Arizona
- Region served: United States
- Website: https://www.tunidito.org

Tu Nidito, meaning “your little nest” in Spanish, is a non-profit agency in Tucson, Arizona that provides support for children affected by serious medical conditions and death. The programs they offer include grief support for children and young adults that have experienced the death of a loved one, support for children with serious medical conditions, and support for children and teenagers that have a parent diagnosed with a serious medical condition, such as cancer.

== History of Tu Nidito ==
Tu Nidito Children and Family Services was initially established in 1994 as a 501(c)3 non-profit in Tucson, Arizona under the name Tu Nidito Children's Hospice with Melanie Siani as the first board chairperson. The organization was conceived through a community focus group of medical professionals, bereaved parents, and other citizens of Tucson, Arizona.

== Tu Nidito Children's Hospice ==
Originally, the organization was a hospice care agency for dying children, licensed by the state of Arizona in 1996 (Limberis, 2000) and accepting its first client that same year. It surrendered its hospice license in February 2000 after failing to meet a number of state regulations for hospice agencies, including not having a nurse on staff, failing to update physicians orders for patients on a monthly basis, and failing to be available 24 hours a day, seven days a week to patients. and accepting its first client that same year. In total, Arizona Department of Health Services found Tu Nidito Children's Hospice out of compliance with state regulations in nine instances after an inspection in the fall of 1999. and accepting its first client that same year. Tu Nidito took “hospice” out its name late in 2000 and accepting its first client that same year. and focused on expanding the non-medical support they had begun offering in 1997 to terminally ill children and their families.

During this period in 1999, Tu Nidito's executive director Liz McCusker, hired a nurse who subsequently leveled accusations about the general disarray of the agency and failures in oversight by McCusker, echoing the Arizona Department of Health Service's report. Two weeks after Tu Nidito lost its license to operate its hospice services, Liz McCusker filed a defamation suit for $1 million in damages along with a restraining order to prevent this nurse from saying anything about McCusker's work as director at Tu Nidito. After the suit was dropped and a settlement was reached, Liz McCusker filed a second suit saying the woman had breached the agreement. Despite these difficulties, many community members voiced support for Liz McCusker and her work at the organization. She has continued in her position of executive director since April 1997, overseeing a successful and wide-reaching expansion of its services.

== History of the name ==
The name “Tu Nidito” means “your little nest” in Spanish. The organization selected this name in memory of Jimmy Busey, who died of cancer at age 6. He and his mother Teri Busey, who worked with Candlelighters of Tucson after her son's death in 1993, referred to a small, safe space they created on the couch with pillows, blankets and toys as his “little nest."

== Mission and importance ==
Tu Nidito's mission is to provide emotional, social, spiritual, and educational support to children and families coping with serious illness and death.

Today children are increasingly exposed to death and loss. It is important that children are not overlooked during this difficult time. This is why Tu Nidito feels it necessary to establish child-centered care. This form of bereavement intervention has helped the Tucson community deal with grief. The process of grief can cause trauma and disrupt a child's life. There are many different types of grief, not just grief and loss from death of loved ones. It is important to understand individual needs and offer a diverse range of programs that can adapt to each situation. There are a number of programs that are used as forms of bereavement interventions within Tu Nidito.

== Programs and services ==
All of Tu Nidito's services are centered around the needs of children and young adults and have expanded over time to include hundreds of children and different dimensions of support.

== Focus on age groups ==
Children at different developmental stages have varied understanding about death and grief. The way they communicate and feel about death varies from age group to age group. This is why it is important to have separate groups for children of different ages. A study done by a University of Arizona student at Tu Nidito showed that children from ages 4–7 used story telling more than the other age groups as a way of communicating about grief. Most avoidance was shown among the children from ages 4–12. Children in the 8-12 age group communicated the most sadness out of all three groups (littles, middles and teens). The teenager group (13-18) communicated more guilt, anger and uncertainty (Keffeler, 2010).

The developmental stage of the child affects their understanding of death and grief, making it essential for support programs to focus on the needs of the specific age groups. Young children from ages 2–7 generally do not understand the finality of death. They may believe in magical thinking and the reversibility of death. This may make them wish the deceased to come back to life and not show signs of grieving. They may feel guilty and believe that they caused the disease. For children ages 7–11, this is the latency age. They may be in denial and pretend the death did not occur. Their inability to deal with death may cause an increased fear of death. For children in the pre-pubertal stage (9-12), feelings of helplessness, guilt and anger may be experienced. Support groups specific for these different ages can address these different concerns. Tu Nidito separates their support groups based on ages around the ages where these differences in understanding occur.

== Children with a parent diagnosed with a serious illness ==
For these children, support groups help them understand and cope with the stress of having a seriously ill parent.

Three common worries that these children may ask include:

1. They caused the illness in the parent.
2. The illness is contagious.
3. They want to know who will fill in for the sick parent while they are ill.

These worries can be alleviated as the child receives support. Families in this support group meet twice a month and participate in age specific activities.

== Children with a life-threatening disease ==
Support for children as they deal with serious medical conditions is important because although they may not understand the severity of the diagnosis or prognosis, they can perceive what is happening. They may seek comfort and protection. Young children may also blame their parents for their medical condition. For older children, they may feel upset because of their reliance on parents and others due to having their independence taken away (Gyulay, 1978). In addition to providing support for the children, which is the main focus of Tu Nidito, support groups are also available for adults who care for the children as well as any siblings.

== Other programs and activities ==
Aside from support groups, Tu Nidito has other activities/programs as well.

=== Camp Erin ===
Camp Erin is a weekend bereavement camp designed for ages 6–17, funded by the Moyer Foundation that takes place in many locations. Tu Nidito helps facilitate a camp for Arizona. Camp activities, grief education and emotional support are provided during this weekend camp. Individual support sessions are also available for children diagnosed with a serious illness.

=== PB&J with Love ===
For children who have a parent with a serious medical condition, a program called 'PB&J with Love' is also available when they are enrolled in the support group. This program provides single parent families with eight meals each month.

=== Remarkable Moms ===
In addition to their services for families struggling with the death or illness of a child or parent, Tu Nidito recognizes moms from the Tucson community. Each year, the public is able to nominate mothers who have done work to support the needs of families affected by serious illness or death.

== Funding ==
For many years, one of the main sources of fund-raising for Tu Nidito was through El Tour de Tucson, a bike race and charity event in Tucson, Arizona. Tu Nidito was the primary charity recipient for the race from 1997 to 2013, raising $310,000 for Tu Nidito in 2013 alone. In early 2014, El Tour de Tucson announced that Tu Nidito would no longer be the primary charity of the race, saying the race organizers felt they had helped establish Tu Nidito as a solid non-profit and wanted to work with another organization, which they had not selected at the time of the announcement. Subsequently, Tu Nidito voiced concern over being able to raise adequate funds though they stated there were “no hard feelings” about the race organizers' decision. Though Tu Nidito will still receive some funds from the race and also receive donations from other organizations, none are as substantial as the donations generated from being the main charity of the race.
