= Upper Albany Historic District =

Historic district in Connecticut, United States

- U.S. National Register of Historic Places
- U.S. Historic district
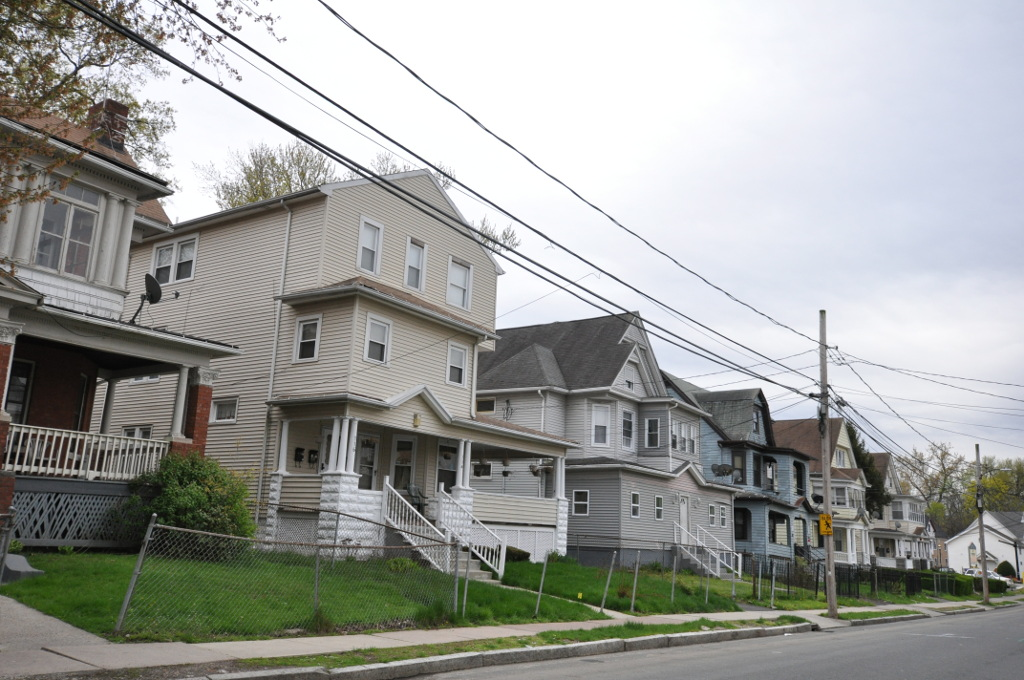

- Location within Connecticut Location within the United States
- Location: Roughly bounded by Holcomb Street, Vine Street, Homestead Avenue, and Woodland and Ridgefield Streets, Hartford, Connecticut
- Coordinates: 41°47′9″N 72°41′26″W
- Area: 315 acres (127 ha)
- Built: 1897
- Architect: Schoville, William H.; Et al.
- Architectural style: Colonial Revival, Queen Anne, Shingle Style
- NRHP reference No.: 86003383
- Added to NRHP: September 29, 1986

The Upper Albany Historic District encompasses a predominantly residential area of the North End of Hartford, Connecticut. It extends along Albany Avenue (United States Route 44) between Garden and Woodland Streets, including side streets to the south, and extends northward to include the southern portion of Keney Park. This area was developed in the first two decades of the 20th century, and has a fine array of period middle-class housing in the Queen Anne and Colonial Revival styles. It was listed on the National Register of Historic Places in 1986.

== Description and history ==
Albany Avenue was laid out in the early 19th century as a turnpike connecting Hartford to Albany, New York. The stretch in the northern part of the city was initially farmland, and it was where a number of wealthy Hartford businessmen, notably James Goodwin and James Goodwin Batterson, built large country estates in the second half of the 19th century. In the 1890s Hartford's streetcar system was extended along Albany Avenue, opening the area to more intensive development. Streets were platted on either side of the road, with many of the house lots sold to individuals who hired builders to put up houses. The houses were of a size and scale designed to appeal to the city's rapidly growing middle class, and had higher quality features than typical worker tenement housing of the period. Keney Park, at the northern end of the district, was established in 1898 by a bequest from businessman Henry Keney, and was one of the attractions whose easy access was promoted by developers.

Most of the houses 663 buildings in the district are houses set on relatively narrow lots, and share a significant number of common architectural elements. They are typically of wood frame constructions and 2 to 2-1/2 stories in height. Their exteriors are clad in a combination of wooden clapboards and shingles, the latter sometimes decoratively cut in the Queen Anne style. Porches are another common feature, often with Tuscan columns, as are leaded stained-glass windows and Palladian windows. Commercial development is generally limited to Albany Avenue itself, in some cases as alterations to period houses, and period buildings housing more than two units (triple decker tenements and apartment blocks) are mainly limited to Lenox Street.

== See also ==
- National Register of Historic Places listings in Hartford, Connecticut
