= Jeff Gordon (politician) =

American politician (born 1967)

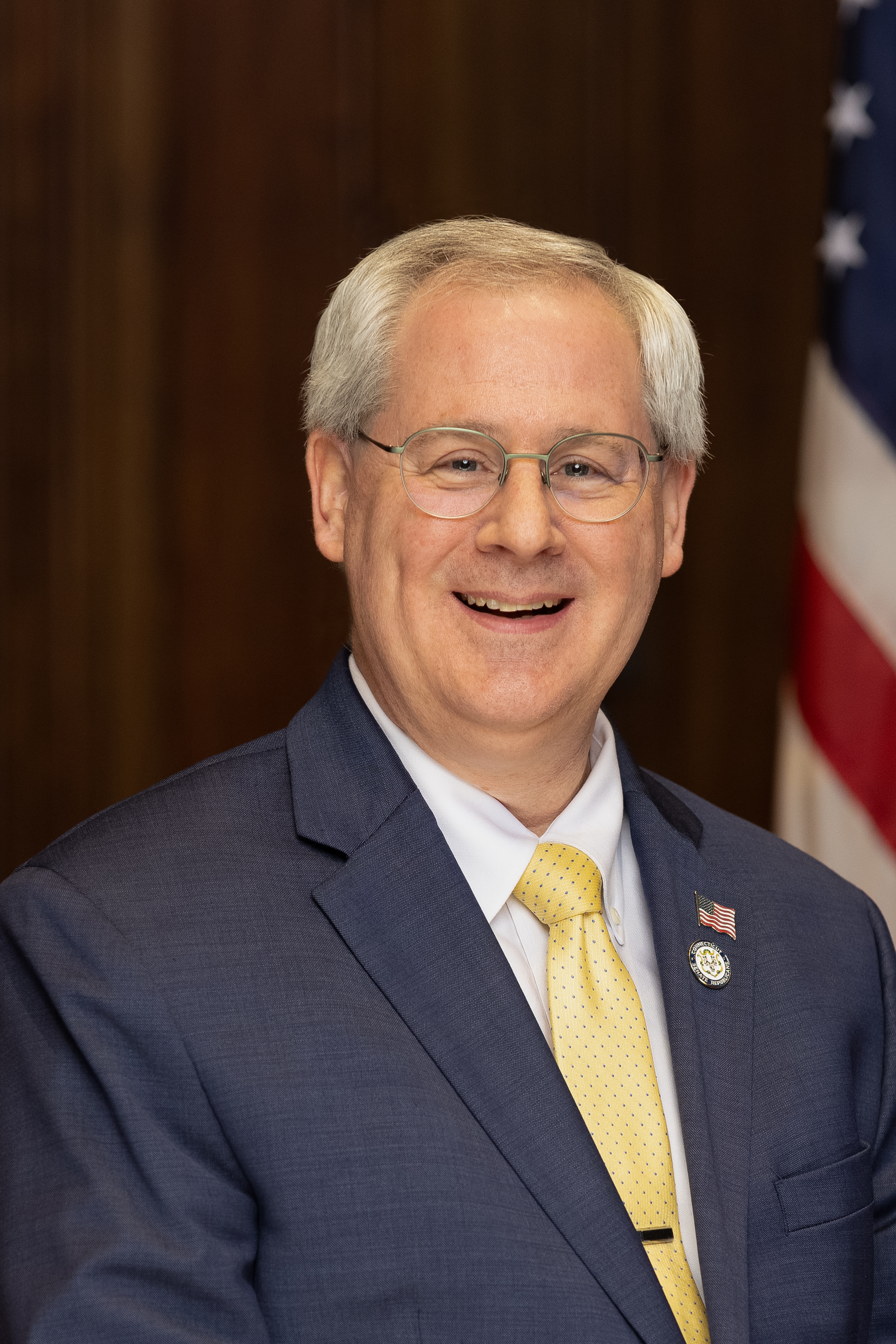
- Jeff Gordon in 2024

Member of the Connecticut Senate from the 35th district
- Incumbent
- Assumed office January 4, 2023
- Preceded by: Dan Champagne
- Succeeded by: Ethan Werstler (elect)

Personal details
- Born: Jeffrey Alan Gordon; October 18, 1967 (age 59) Worcester, Massachusetts, U.S.
- Party: Republican
- Spouse: Dr. Lisa Canter
- Children: 1
- Occupation: Physician, politician
- Website: Official website

Jeffrey Alan Gordon is an American physician and politician who is a member of the Connecticut State Senate representing the 35th District. He is a member of the Republican Party. He won election in 2022 and re-election in 2024.

== Early life ==
Gordon was born and raised in Worcester, Massachusetts. He graduated from Doherty Memorial High School in 1985.

== Education ==
Gordon graduated from Brandeis University with a Bachelor of Arts in 1989. He graduated from the UMass Chan Medical School (formerly known as the University of Massachusetts Medical School) with a Doctor of Medicine (M.D.) in 1993.

Gordon completed a Residency in Internal Medicine at the University of Massachusetts Medical Center in 1996. He then completed a Fellowship in Hematology and Medical Oncology at the University of Massachusetts Medical Center in 1999.

== Professional career ==
Gordon is a physician who specializes in the care of people who have blood disorders or cancers (hematologist-oncologist). He is Board certified in both Hematology and Medical Oncology.

== Political career ==
Gordon is a former President (2016–2017), Council Chair, and Speaker of the House of Delegates of the Connecticut State Medical Society.

Gordon served 16 years (four, 4-year terms) as a member of the Town of Woodstock Planning & Zoning Commission (2007 - 2023). Fifteen of those years Gordon served as chairman, being unanimously elected to each 1-year term as chairman.

Gordon was elected as a Republican to the State Senate in November 2022 from Connecticut's 35th State Senate district; his district covers 13 towns in northeastern and north central Connecticut: Ashford, Chaplin, Coventry, Eastford, Ellington (part), Hampton, Stafford, Thompson (part), Tolland, Union, Vernon, Willington, and Woodstock.

Gordon took office in January 2023 for his first term. During this time, Gordon served as the Ranking Senator on the Veterans and Military Affairs Committee. Gordon also served on the Appropriations, Public Health, and Public Safety and Security committees.

== Electoral history ==
2022 Connecticut State Senate 35th district
Party	Candidate	Votes	%
Republican	Jeff Gordon	20,927	50.6%
Democratic	Lisa Thomas	20,456	49.4%
Total votes		41.383	100%
Republican hold			

2024 Connecticut State Senate 35th district
Party	Candidate	Votes	%
Republican	Jeff Gordon (incumbent)	28,613	52.92%
Democratic	Merry Garrett	25,453	47.08%
Total votes		54,066	100%
Republican hold			
