= Franklin G. Welles =

American politician (1903–1990)

Member of the Connecticut Senate from the 35th district
- In office 1961–1967
- Preceded by: David J. Dickson Jr.
- Succeeded by: Andrew Repko

Personal details
- Born: September 21, 1903 Wethersfield, Connecticut, U.S.
- Died: September 7, 1990 (aged 86)
- Party: Republican
- Spouse: Dorothy Welles
- Children: 3

Franklin G. Welles (September 21, 1903 – September 7, 1990) was an American politician who served as a member of the Connecticut State Senate from the 35th district from 1961 to 1967. He was a member of the Republican Party.

== Personal life ==
Welles was born on September 21, 1903, in Wethersfield, Connecticut. He was married to Dorothy Welles and had three daughters. He was a Freemason and a lodge officer in South Windsor.

Welles died at Manchester Memorial Hospital in Manchester, Connecticut, on September 7, 1990. He was 86.

== Political career ==
Welles was elected to the Connecticut State Senate in the 1960 general election, defeating incumbent David J. Dickson Jr. with 15,313 votes (51.3 percent). He was re-elected in 1962, defeating Edward A. Cormier with 14,159 votes (52.0 percent).

Before serving in the Senate, Welles was elected as a state representative from Vernon in 1956. He also ran for the 35th district Senate seat in 1958, but lost to Dickson.

A district history listing identifies Welles's home as Talcottville and records him as the senator for the 35th district from 1961 to 1967.

== Electoral history ==
Year	Office	Result	Opponent	Vote
1958	Connecticut State Senate, 35th district	Lost	David J. Dickson Jr.	11,053 (47.5%)
1960	Connecticut State Senate, 35th district	Won	David J. Dickson Jr.	15,313 (51.3%)
1962	Connecticut State Senate, 35th district	Won	Edward A. Cormier	14,159 (52.0%)
