= Katharine Gibbs School – Melville =

Coordinates: 40°46′44″N 73°24′55.65″W

Katharine Gibbs School - Melville
- Type: For-profit college
- Location: 320 South Service Road, Melville, NY 11747, Melville, New York, United States
- Campus: Large City
- Website: www.gibbsmelville.edu

The Katharine Gibbs School was a for-profit college in Melville, New York. It was founded in 1911 in association with Gibbs College.

== Campus ==
The campus was located at 320 South Service Road, Melville, New York.

== Transition to Sanford Brown Institute ==
Since December 8, 2008, the Katharine Gibbs School campus is Sanford-Brown Institute.

== Accreditation ==
Katharine Gibbs School – Melville was accredited by the Accrediting Council for Independent Colleges and Schools (ACICS) to award certificates and associate degrees.

It was authorized by the Board of Regents of the University of the State of New York to confer the Associate in Applied Science, the Associate in Occupational Studies, and certificate programs.
