= Kim Fawcett =

American politician

Member of the Connecticut House of Representatives from the 133rd district
- In office 2007–2015
- Preceded by: Cathy Tymniak
- Succeeded by: Cristin McCarthy Vahey

Personal details
- Born: Montgomery County, Maryland, U.S.
- Party: Democratic
- Education: George Washington University (M.A.); Towson University (B.A.)

Kim Fawcett is an American politician who served in the Connecticut House of Representatives from 2007 to 2015, representing the 133rd district as a Democrat.
