= Connecticut's 35th State Senate district =

American legislative district

Senator
Jeff Gordon; R

Connecticut's 35th State Senate district elects one member of the Connecticut State Senate. It consists of the communities of Ashford, Chaplin, Coventry, Eastford, Ellington (part), Hampton, Pomfret, Stafford, Tolland, Union, Vernon, Willington, and Woodstock. It has been represented by Republican Jeff Gordon since 2023.

== List of senators ==
Senators	Party	Years	District home	Note
Franklin G. Welles	Republican	1961 – 1967	Talcottville	
Andrew Repko	Republican	1967 – 1969	West Willington	
Robert D. Houley	Democratic	1969 – 1973	Vernon	
Thomas G. Carruthers	Republican	1973 – 1975	Vernon	
Robert D. Houley	Democratic	1975 – 1979	Vernon	
Michael J. "Mike" Skelley	Democratic	1979 – 1985	Tolland	
James D. Giulietti	Republican	1985 – 1987	Vernon	
Marie Herbst	Democratic	1987 – 1993	Vernon	
Tony Guglielmo	Republican	1993 – 2019	Stafford Springs	
Dan Champagne	Republican	2019 – 2023	Vernon	
Jeff Gordon	Republican	2023 – present	Woodstock	

== Recent elections ==
=== 2020 ===
2020 Connecticut State Senate election, District 35
Party	Candidate	Votes	%
Democratic	Lisa Thomas	25,871	45.47
Republican	Dan Champagne (incumbent)	28,763	50.55
Independent Party	Lisa Thomas	1,208	2.12
Working Families	Lisa Thomas	1,059	1.86
Total votes		56,903	100.00
Republican hold			

=== 2018 ===
2018 Connecticut State Senate election, District 35
Party	Candidate	Votes	%
Republican	Dan Champagne	22,837	51.0
Total	John Perrier	21,938	49.0
Democratic	John Perrier	19,999	44.7
Working Families	John Perrier	1,065	2.4
Independent	John Perrier	874	2.0
Total votes		44,775	100.0
Republican hold			

=== 2016 ===
2016 Connecticut State Senate election, District 35
Party	Candidate	Votes	%
Democratic	Arlene Avery	19,199	37.62
Republican	Anthony Gulglielmo (incumbent)	31,829	62.38
Total votes		51,028	100.00
Republican hold			

=== 2014 ===
2014 Connecticut State Senate election, District 35
Party	Candidate	Votes	%
Working Families	Andrea Penta	5,183	16.9
Republican	Anthony Gulglielmo (incumbent)	25,547	83.1
Total votes		30,730	100.00
Republican hold			

=== 2012 ===
2012 Connecticut State Senate election, District 35
Party	Candidate	Votes	%
Democratic	Susan Eastwood	18,928	40.5
Republican	Anthony Gulglielmo (incumbent)	27,840	59.50
Total votes		46,768	100.00
Republican hold			
