= Ben's Bells =

Tucson, Arizona-originated program

Ben's Bells is a Tucson, Arizona-originated program that aims to promote kindness throughout the local community and world through the creation and distribution of handmade bells. Its mission is to “inspire, educate, and motivate people to realize the impact of intentional kindness, and to empower individuals to act according to that awareness, thereby strengthening ourselves, our relationships, and our communities”. Ben's Bells was founded in 2003 by Jeannette Maré after the death of her three-year-old son and has grown to become a worldwide coping mechanism for the expression of love and support.

== History ==
Jeannette Maré began the starting works of Ben's Bells as a way to cope with the death of her three-year-old son Ben from croup on March 29, 2002. She found comfort in the kind acts of strangers and in spending time with friends and family in her backyard studio shaping clay into what are now recognizable bells seen all over Tucson. On the one-year anniversary of her son's death, Maré and friends distributed hundreds of bells around the Tucson community for people to find with notes saying to take one and pass on the kindness.

There are now three studios where individuals can help create the ceramic wind chimes that are randomly distributed throughout the community for people to take and continue to spread the kindness to others. These studios are located in Tucson's main gate, downtown Tucson, and Bethel, Connecticut.

Ben's Bells has grown from just the creation and spreading of the bells to incorporating their mission of compassion and acceptance in schools in hopes of reducing bullying and school violence. There are now two school programs, Kind Kid and Kind Campus, which are being implemented in over 200 schools across the nation that teach kids the importance of kind acts through their “be kind” message that is seen throughout the city. The schools are presented with monthly educational materials and are then able to choose how they wish to implement these strategies into their curriculum. Those who have used these programs in their schools say they have seen noticeable differences in the way the children interact with one another and how they continue to perform random acts of kindness.

=== In the wake of tragedy ===
Ben's Bells have been used as a symbol of hope and support for communities after tragedies strike. This was first seen in the organization's hometown in January 2011 after a supermarket shooting that left six dead and twelve injured, including United States Representative Gabby Giffords. Following the day of the shooting, dozens of bells were hung around the crime scene to show support for those harmed by the attack. The bells, accompanied with notes to take them and spread kindness, aimed to help remind the community that there is still good in the world and serve as a reminder to be kind.

Community support expressed through the sharing of Ben's Bells was seen across the country after two significant school tragedies as well. On the first anniversary of the Virginia Tech shooting, volunteers traveled to Blacksburg to hang hundreds of bells around the campus in hopes of spreading love and hope to those struggling with this significant day. The presence of the bells on campus showed the students that they were supported by people across the country and served as a reminder that there are still good people in the world.

This sign of hope and support for one another was also seen after the Sandy Hook Elementary School shooting. Ben's Bells reached out to the Tucson community to collect 1,000 bells to bring across the country to Newtown, as an act of kindness to their community. This spurred the Tucson community to show support for Ben's Bells and the intentions of its directors. According to Maré, “tragedies are what bring it out in people, but people really understand kindness at a different level, they understand kindness is not a soft issue, that it’s not a fluffy thing, that it’s not a weakness. That kindness is, bottom line, the most important thing that there is”.

=== Ben’s Bells Studios ===
The organization achieved its 501 status in 2003 and opened its first studio in 2005 near the University of Arizona campus in Tucson. The studio, open five days a week, allows members of the community to help sculpt the beads and/or paint them before they are fastened to the bells. In 2012 a second studio in downtown Tucson was opened, more than tripling the production capability of the organization. In 2013, a Ben's Bells studio was opened in Bethel, Connecticut, following the Sandy Hook tragedy. After being contacted by a Newtown resident, Jeannette and Dean decided to open a studio where residents could create bells, as well as hang the bells all around the town in hopes of healing.

=== Current programs and activities ===
The “Be Kind Challenge”, part of the Ben's Bells education program, has quickly blossomed from its Tucson origins to various other areas of the country where tragedy has struck, including Newtown after the Sandy Hook Elementary School shooting.

The challenge continues through the Kind Campus program which targets elementary schools, middle schools, and high schools in Tucson. The program teaches five fundamental educational aspects: self-awareness, social awareness, responsible decision making, self-management, and relationship management. Ben's Bells provides the material for the program free of charge to campuses that request it.

As an addition to the Be Kind campaign, one deserving Tucsonan is awarded with a bell each week for an act of kindness that was noticed by the community. Nominations for the “belling” can be submitted on the Ben's Bells website and is announced via radio. Be Kind merchandise and assortments of bells are sold at local Ben's Bells studios as well as on their website to fund their programs.

=== Effects of kindness on health ===
Spreading kindness is the mission behind Ben's Bells because of the scientific effects that kindness has on one's health. The smallest actions by other individuals, especially strangers, can greatly impact the lives of others. Reaching out to those in need and showing support can be all that they really need in order to cope — just knowing that someone is there. The random acts of kindness and paying it forward movements have become a trend; however, they do more than people may think. Not only does performing a random act of kindness make the recipient feel good, but the one performing the act benefits as well. Studies have shown that people who perform random acts of kindness for others tend to be happier than those who do not. Spreading kindness to those in need creates a kindness effect in which people in turn go out and do further kind acts for others.
