= Tim Larson =

American politician (born 1958)

Executive Director of the Connecticut Office of Higher Education
- Incumbent
- Assumed office 2019
- Governor: Ned Lamont

Member of the Connecticut State Senate from the 3rd district
- In office 2015 – January 8, 2019
- Preceded by: Gary LeBeau
- Succeeded by: Saud Anwar

Member of the Connecticut House of Representatives from the 11th district
- In office 2009–2015
- Preceded by: Michael A. Christ
- Succeeded by: Jeffrey Currey

Mayor of East Hartford
- In office 1997–2005
- Preceded by: Robert DeCrescenzoa
- Succeeded by: Melody Currey

Member of the East Hartford Town Council
- In office 1990–1992

Personal details
- Born: Timothy D. Larson; December 12, 1958 (age 67) East Hartford, Connecticut, U.S.
- Party: Democratic
- Relations: John B. Larson (brother)

Timothy D. Larson (born December 12, 1958) is an American politician from Connecticut.

== Early life and education ==
Larson was born on December 12, 1958, in East Hartford, Connecticut, to Raymond and Lois Pauline Larson. The youngest of eight children, one of Larson's brothers is politician John B. Larson. Larson was raised in Mayberry Village and attended East Hartford High School, graduating in 1976.

== Career ==
He served on the East Hartford Town Council from 1990 to 1992, and received the most votes in the 1991 East Hartford Town Council election, but did not contest the 1993 municipal election. Larson remained active in politics by helping his brother John run his gubernatorial campaign in 1994. Tim Larson later worked as assistant to East Hartford mayor Robert DeCrescenzo. When DeCrescenzo announced that he would not seek another term in office, both Larson and Henry Genga sought the mayoralty as Democrats. Larson accepted the endorsement of the local Democratic Party in July 1997, and defeated Genga in a primary that September. Larson then won the November general election against Republican Richard L. Mourey. Larson faced Bob Fortier in 1999, and won a third term against Susan Kniep in 2001. He remained mayor through 2005.

Larson first sat on the Connecticut House of Representatives in 2008. He was reelected unopposed from the eleventh district in 2010, and defeated Thomas Ogar in 2012. In 2014, Larson ran for the Connecticut Senate seat from the third district. He retained his seat in 2016, winning 56.4% of the vote against Carolyn Streeter Mirek, deputy mayor of South Windsor.

While Larson was reelected to the Connecticut House of Representatives in 2018, he did not take office for his third term as State Senator, as he was named by Ned Lamont to head the Office of Higher Education despite having never worked in higher education.

On December 26, 2023, Larson was sued in a class action lawsuit along with other employees of the State of Connecticut employees as the result of damages caused to students in his mismanagement of the closure and the unlawful revocation of credits of students from Stone Academy.

For ten years Larson also served as executive director of Tweed New Haven Airport.
