= Metropolitan District Commission of Connecticut =

Water utility in the Hartford, Connecticut, area

- Headquarters in Hartford, CT (2026)
- Type: Public Utility
- Industry: Water and Sewage
- Founded: Hartford, CT (1929)
- Area served: Greater Hartford
- Key people: William A. DiBella, Chairman
- Website: themdc.org

The Metropolitan District Commission of Connecticut (MDC) is a public not-for-profit municipal corporation chartered by the Connecticut General Assembly in 1929 to provide potable water and sewer systems to the Hartford area. The original agreement tied together the water systems of Hartford, Bloomfield, Newington, Wethersfield, and Windsor, later adding West Hartford, Rocky Hill, and East Hartford to its membership. As of 2023, the MDC serves much of the Greater Hartford region, reaching nearly 500,000 residents in its eight member cities and towns as well as parts of East Granby, Farmington, Glastonbury, Windsor Locks, South Windsor, and Portland. The commission is run by a 29-member board of commissioners; 17 of which are appointed by the member towns, eight by the governor, and four by legislative leaders. The current Chairman of the MDC Board is Donald Currey, the husband of Melody Currey and father of Jeffrey Currey. Its former chairman was William A. DiBella.

== History ==
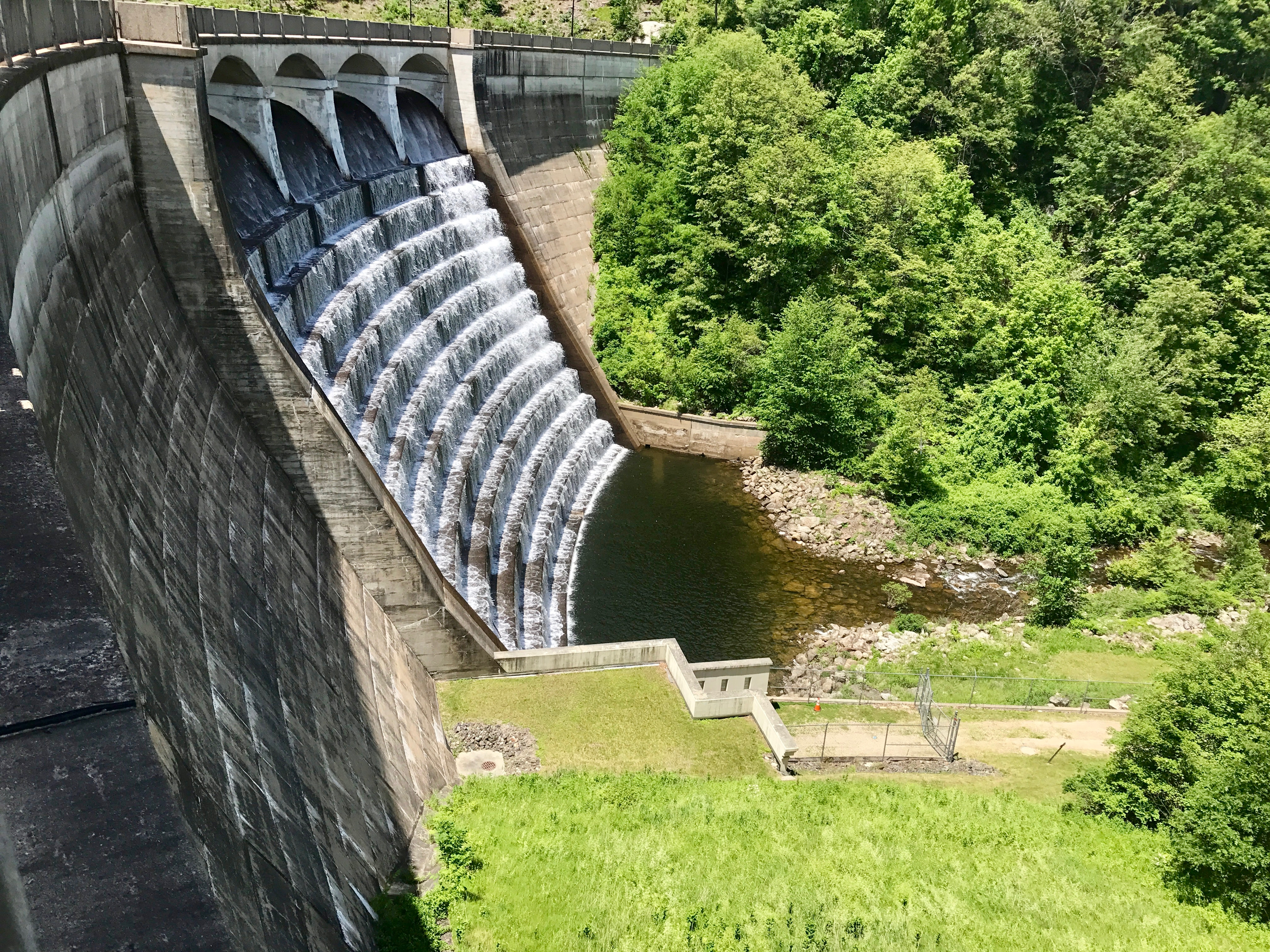
The Nepaug Dam

In 1929, the MDC assumed operation of the Nepaug Reservoir, a 9.5 billion gallon reservoir spanning the parts of New Hartford, Canton, and Burlington, as well as the 6 smaller reservoirs in West Hartford.

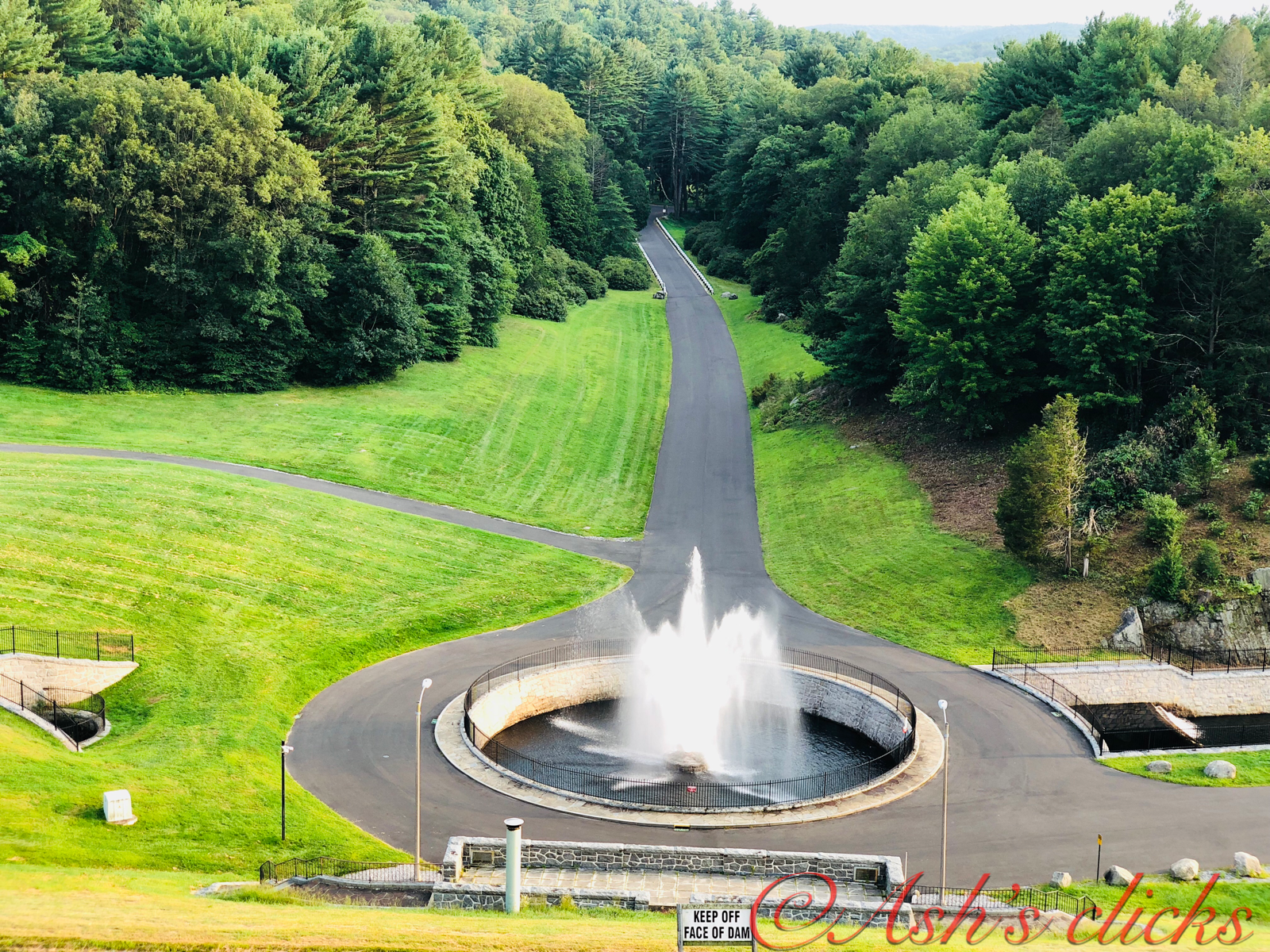
Spill way of Saville Dam Barkhamsted

In 1924, years before its official charter, MDC began acquiring land for the planned Barkhamsted Reservoir along the East Branch of the Farmington River in Barkhamsted and Hartland. In 1932, under Chairman Charles Goodwin, the MDC was forced to slow its land acquisition as a result of the poor bond market during the Great Depression. Land stripping, building and cemetery relocations, and demolitions of two hamlets, Barkhamsted Hollow and Hartland Hollow, were completed in 1940. Flooding began late that fall, though it took 8 years for the reservoir to fill to capacity when water crested the Saville spillway in 1948.

Construction of the first water pollution control facility on the Connecticut River was completed in 1938, in Hartford's South Meadows region. Two more WPCs were added in Rocky Hill and East Hartford to accommodate Greater Hartford's growth after World War II. During the same period, the Goodwin Dam was built along the West Branch of the Farmington River, locally known as the Hogback Reservoir.

In 2017 the MDC began work on The South Hartford Conveyance and Storage Tunnel, the largest project in the District's history. The 18 ft diameter tunnel will extend four miles at a depth of over 200 ft and will carry stormwater during significant rain events; this project is the cornerstone of a larger sewer-stormwater separation project aimed at improving water quality in Wethersfield Cove, the Connecticut River, and Long Island Sound. The South Hartford Conveyance and Storage Tunnel project has an estimated budget of over $500 million.

== Reservoirs ==
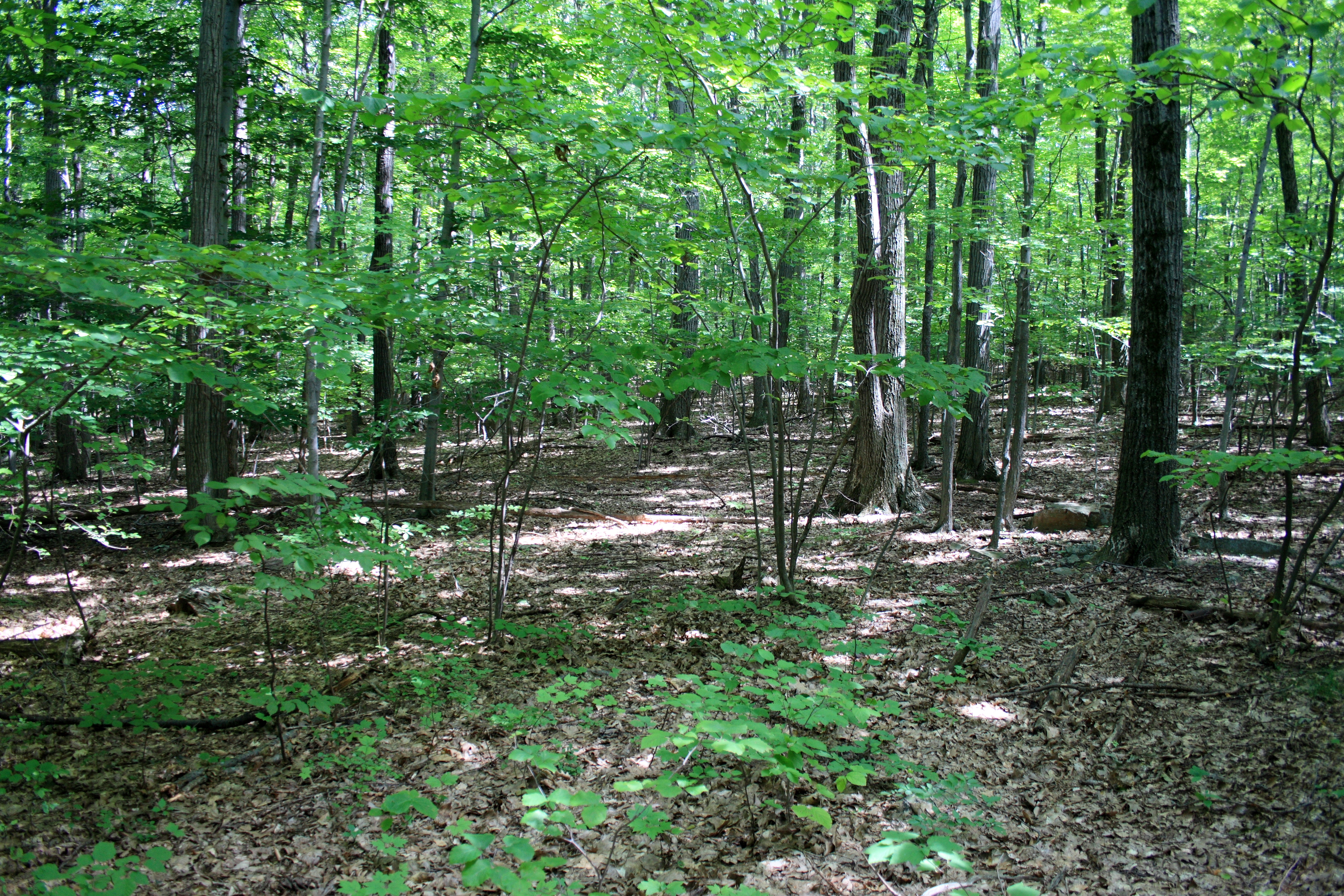
Woods of Rochambeau campsite in West Hartford, August 27, 2008

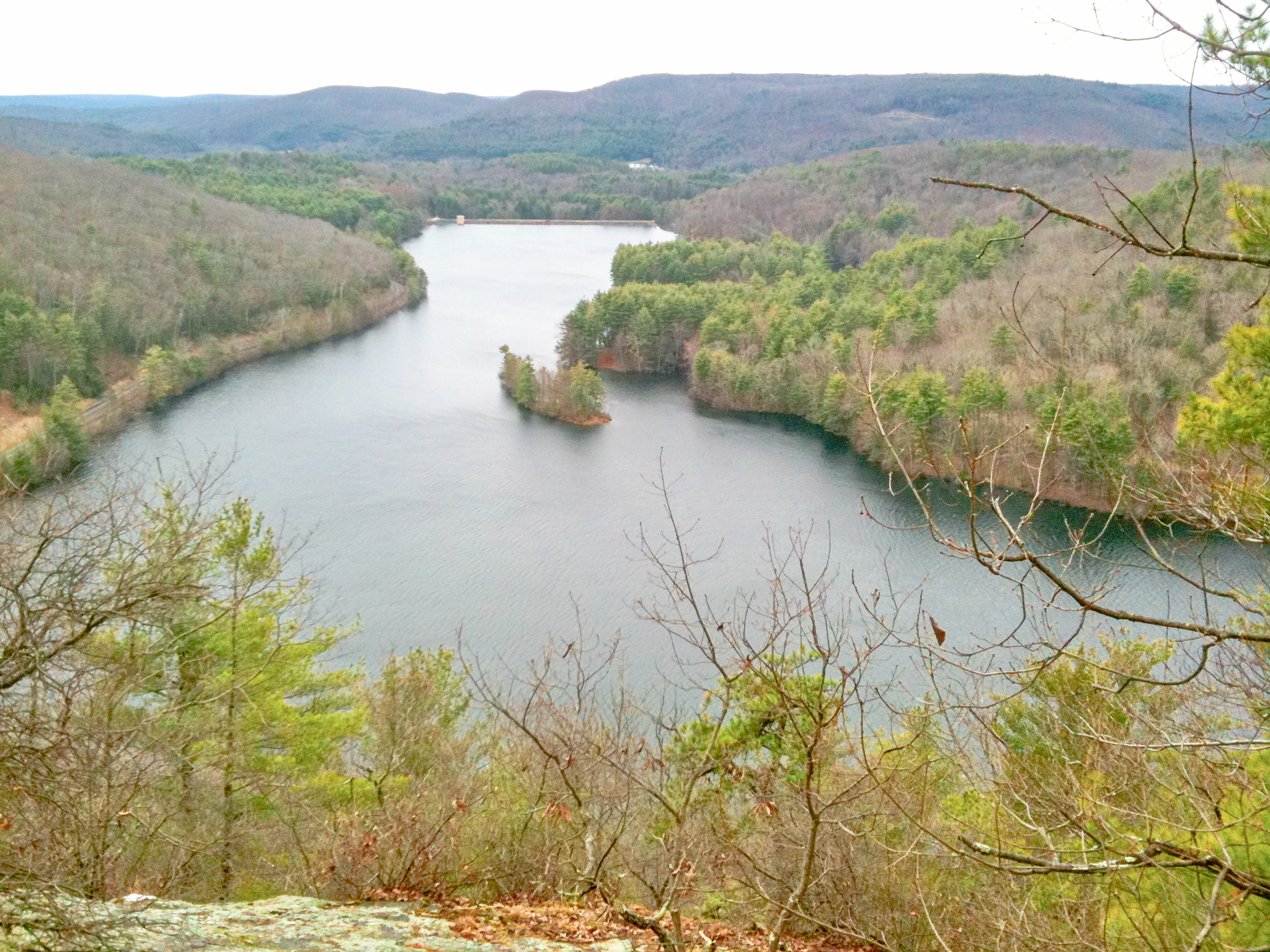
Lake Mcdonough from Tunxis Trail

The Barkhamsted Reservoir was commissioned in 1940 after the completion of the Saville Dam on the East Branch of the Farmington River at a cost of $10 million. It is the largest reservoir in Connecticut, the largest impoundment on the Farmington River system, and its 54 acre watershed extends from the towns of Barkhamsted and Hartland, Connecticut into Western Massachusetts. The reservoir's 30.3 billion gallon capacity supplies nearly 75% of the drinking water for Greater Hartford. Water from the reservoir is transferred by pipes to filtration stations in West Hartford and Bloomfield using only gravitational force.

The West Hartford Reservoirs are a series of five reservoirs and a number of ponds and water tanks in West Hartford, Connecticut. The Revolutionary War Campsite is a historic archaeological site located on MDC land near Reservoir #6.

Nepaug Reservoir

Lake McDonough and Hogback Reservoir

== Headquarters ==
The current MDC headquarters on the corner of Main and Wells in Downtown Hartford was built in the late 1970s and has ~60,000 square feet of floor space. Its brutalist facade matches the design language of neighboring buildings.

== Metropolitan District Commission Police ==
The MDC has its own police force to enforce the law and protect its various operations. According to the MDC use of its facilities is "regulated by the Connecticut Department of Public Health (Section 24-43c of the Connecticut General Statutes) and enforced by MDC police." The current Chief of Police of The MDC Police is Henry Martin. In 2011 CEO Charles Sheehan stated that Metropolitan District Officers operate both in uniform and in plain clothes, and that they maintain order at the MDC's corporate headquarters in addition to the field facilities.

== Controversies ==
=== Niagara Bottling Plant ===
In 2015–6, the MDC was criticized for opaque business practices regarding discounts to industrial users without public consultation. MDC gave Niagara Bottling in Bloomfield the first bulk discount since the District began operating. Both MDC and Bloomfield's Town Council neither gave public notice nor offered public comment until after the agreement was completed.

In 2016 the MDC Board voted to discontinue the Niagara discount as part of efforts to restore public trust and appease the State Legislature. After the controversy, regulators at PURA recommended increased transparency and external audits in addition to the MDC's own.

=== Chairman DiBella ===
In 2008 MDC Chairman William A. DiBella was ordered by the SEC to pay $795,000 in restitution for his role in an investment scheme involving former State Treasurer Paul J. Silvester and Thayer Capital Partners. DiBella and his associates received payments by Thayer in return for investing money from the Connecticut State Retirement and Trust Fund into Thayer's investment firm.

As DiBella was MDC Chairman at the time, there was public pressure for his resignation or termination. The Federation of Connecticut Taxpayer Organizations was one such organization seeking DiBella's removal, adding DiBella to their "Hall of Shame" list of unethical public officials. Mark Pappa, a fellow MDC Commissioner, stated that "If this was a publicly traded company this conversation wouldn't even happen because there's no question Mr. DiBella would not be sitting here."

In August 2022, the MDC announced that it was investigating $80,000 billed for legal services provided earlier that year by James Sandler, of Sandler & Mara PC. Sandler's contract was terminated by the MDC over concerns about billing in 2021. During discussions at the public hearing, DiBella recused himself for conflict of interest and subsequently left the meeting. The bills were for 79 meetings, most of which listed DiBella as attendee; however, the MDC Commissioners present did not recall any of the billed meetings. MDC's Internal Audit sub-committee then hired an outside attorney to conduct an independent investigation. Although Sandler withdrew his invoices in December 2022, the investigation continued through April 2023, when a final report was submitted to the MDC. The report concluded that DiBella had exceeded his authority in continuing services with Sandler beyond the scope of Sandler's contract and without the involvement of internal counsel. It also highlighted a number of gaps in policies and procedures regarding contracting legal services.

As part of the controversy, including the lengthy delays in initiating the investigation and DiBella's limited cooperation, a State Legislative committee held open hearings to reconsider portions of MDC's charter and the agency's audit requirements.

=== Discrimination lawsuits ===
In 2002 the MDC paid $1.5m to settle claims of discrimination against female and minority employees. MDC Chairman William A. DiBella claimed that the settlement was a result of "The district wanted to get this behind them." A jury in 2000 had awarded the plaintiff, Sharon Harper, $4.6m after finding that MDC officials had defamed her. The Officials spread rumors about Harper that were of a sexual nature and the jury found them to be on their face defamatory; this was seen as highly offensive to Harper because she was a Churchgoer with a conservative southern background. This was the third time in eight years that the MDC was found to be at fault for discriminating against minority employees. Despite the communities it serves being highly diverse the Hartford Courant in 2002 classified the senior management of the MDC as "overwhelmingly white."

In 2016 the MDC paid $350,000 to settle the case Lebert Thomas v. The Metropolitan District et al. It was alleged that the MDC discriminated against Mr. Thomas on the basis of his race. A confidentiality clause was included with the settlement.

== Board of Commissioners ==
As of September 21, 2021 the MDC Board of Commissioners consisted of:

- Andrew Adil
- John Avedisian
- Clifford Avery Buell
- Rick Bush
- Donald M. Currey
- Mary Anne Charron
- William A. DiBella (chairman)
- David Drake
- Peter Gardow
- James Healy
- Allen Hoffman
- Christian Hoheb
- Georgiana Holloway
- David Ionno
- Shubhada Kambli
- Mary LaChance
- Gary LeBeau
- Byron Lester
- Diane Lewis
- Maureen Magnan (Vice Chairwoman)
- Jackie Gorsky Mandyke
- Michael Maniscalco
- Alphonse Marotta
- Domenic M. Pane
- Bhupen Patel
- Jon Petoskey
- Pasquale J. Salemi
- Raymond Sweezy
- Alvin Taylor
- Michael Torres
- Richard W. Vicino
- James Woulfe
