= Connecticut's 14th House of Representatives district =

American legislative district

Connecticut's 14th State House of Representatives district
Representative
Tom Delnicki; R

Connecticut's 14th House of Representatives district elects one member of the Connecticut House of Representatives. It encompasses part of the town of South Windsor. It has been represented by Republican Tom Delnicki since 2017.

== List of representatives ==
List of Representatives from Connecticut's 14th House District
Representative	Party	Years	District home	Note
Owen L. Clark	Democratic	1967–1973	West Hartford	Seat created
G. Warren Westbrook	Republican	1973–1975	South Windsor	
Abraham Glassman	Democratic	1975–1981	South Windsor	
John J. Woodcock III	Democratic	1981–1989	South Windsor	
Kevin Rennie	Republican	1989–1995	South Windsor	
Nancy Kerensky	Democratic	1995–2005	South Windsor	
Bill Aman	Republican	2005–2017	South Windsor	
Tom Delnicki	Republican	2017–	South Windsor	

== Recent elections ==
=== 2024 ===
2024 Connecticut State House of Representatives election, District 14
Party	Candidate	Votes	%
Republican	Tom Delnicki (incumbent)	7,077	54.6
Democratic	Steven King Jr.	5,536	42.7
United Community Party	Marek Kozikowski	358	2.8
Total votes		12,971	100.0
Republican hold			

=== 2022 ===
2022 Connecticut State House of Representatives election, District 14
Party	Candidate	Votes	%
Republican	Tom Delnicki (incumbent)	5,207	51.1
Democratic	Erica Evans	4,715	46.3
United Community Party	Marek Kozikowski	270	2.6
Total votes		10,192	100.0
Republican hold			

=== 2020 ===
2020 Connecticut State House of Representatives election, District 14
Party	Candidate	Votes	%
Republican	Tom Delnicki (incumbent)	7,104	49.42
Democratic	Genevieve Coursey	6,349	44.17
Independent Party	Tom Delnicki (incumbent)	649	4.52
Working Families	Genevieve Coursey	272	1.89
Total votes		14,374	100.00
Republican hold			

=== 2018 ===
2018 Connecticut State House of Representatives election, District 14
Party	Candidate	Votes	%
Republican	Tom Delnicki (incumbent)	6,268	54.8
Democratic	John Pelkey	5,163	45.2
Total votes		11,431	100.00
Republican hold			

=== 2016 ===
2016 Connecticut State House of Representatives election, District 14
Party	Candidate	Votes	%
Republican	Tom Delnicki (incumbent)	6,852	52.62
Democratic	Saud Anwar	6,170	47.38
Total votes		13,022	100.00
Republican hold			

=== 2014 ===
2014 Connecticut State House of Representatives election, District 14
Party	Candidate	Votes	%
Republican	Bill Aman (incumbent)	6,180	66.0
Democratic	Mary Justine Hockenberry	2,831	30.3
Independent Party	Bill Aman (incumbent)	347	3.7
Total votes		9,358	100.00
Republican hold			

=== 2012 ===
2012 Connecticut State House of Representatives election, District 14
Party	Candidate	Votes	%
Republican	Bill Aman (incumbent)	8,454	69.0
Democratic	Carol Driscoll	3,798	31.0
Total votes		12,252	100.00
Republican hold			
