= Connecticut's 11th House of Representatives district =

American legislative district

Connecticut's 11th State House of Representatives district
Representative
Patrick Biggins; D

Connecticut's 11th House of Representatives district elects one member of the Connecticut House of Representatives. It encompasses parts of the towns of East Hartford, Manchester, and South Windsor. It has been represented by Democrat Patrick Biggins since 2025.

== List of representatives ==
List of Representatives from Connecticut's 11th House District
Representative	Party	Years	District home	Note
Thomas P. Byrne	Republican	1967–1973	West Hartford	Seat created
Richard C. Willard	Democratic	1973–1981	East Hartford	
Richard Torpey	Democratic	1981–1991	East Hartford	
Gary LeBeau	Democratic	1991–1995	East Hartford	
Michael A. Christ	Democratic	1995–2009	East Hartford	
Tim Larson	Democratic	2009–2015	East Hartford	
Jeffrey Currey	Democratic	2015–2025	East Hartford	
Patrick Biggins	Democratic	2025–	East Hartford	

== Recent Elections ==
=== 2020 ===
2020 Connecticut State House of Representatives election, District 11
Party	Candidate	Votes	%
Democratic	Jeffrey Currey (incumbent)	5,845	69.72
Republican	Matt Harper	2,329	27.78
Independent Party	Matt Harper	210	2.50
Total votes		8,384	100.00
Democratic hold			

=== 2018 ===
2018 Connecticut State House of Representatives election, District 11
Party	Candidate	Votes	%
Democratic	Jeffrey Currey (incumbent)	4,547	100.0
Total votes		4,547	100.00
Democratic hold			

=== 2016 ===
2016 Connecticut State House of Representatives election, District 11
Party	Candidate	Votes	%
Democratic	Jeffrey Currey (incumbent)	5,794	100.0
Total votes		5,794	100.00
Democratic hold			

=== 2014 ===
2014 Connecticut State House of Representatives election, District 11
Party	Candidate	Votes	%
Democratic	Jeffrey Currey	2,682	65.7
Republican	Jack W. Jacobs	1,400	34.3
Total votes		4,082	100.00
Democratic hold			

=== 2012 ===
2012 Connecticut State House of Representatives election, District 11
Party	Candidate	Votes	%
Democratic	Tim Larson	5,043	77.1
Republican	Thomas A. Ogar	1,495	22.9
Total votes		6,538	100.00
Democratic hold			
