= Marcella Fahey =

American politician

Member of the Connecticut Senate from the 3rd district
- In office 1979–1983
- Preceded by: George W. Hannon Jr.
- Succeeded by: John B. Larson

Personal details
- Party: Democratic

Marcella C. Fahey is an American politician who served in the Connecticut State Senate from 1979 to 1983, representing the 3rd district as a Democrat.
