= Bill Aman =

American politician (born 1946)

Member of the Connecticut House of Representatives from the 14th district
- In office January 5, 2005 – January 4, 2017
- Preceded by: Nancy Kerensky
- Succeeded by: Tom Delnicki

Personal details
- Born: October 5, 1946 (age 80) Buffalo, New York, U.S.
- Party: Republican
- Education: Ithaca College (BS); Long Island University (MBA)

Bill Aman (born October 5, 1946) is an American politician who served in the Connecticut House of Representatives from the 14th district from 2005 to 2017.

== Early life and military service ==
Aman was born on October 5, 1946, in Buffalo, New York. He earned a Bachelor of Science degree in Business Administration from Ithaca College in 1968 and later a Master of Business Administration from Long Island University in 1972. He served as a sergeant in the United States Army during the Vietnam War from 1968 to 1970, and was discharged on 4 August 1970.

== Business career ==
After leaving the Army, Aman worked as a loan officer at Connecticut Bank and Trust Company from 1971 to 1977. He then moved into homebuilding, founding Wilmar Construction Company, of which he became president and owner in 1976. Through the building industry he became active in trade groups, serving as a director of the Hartford County Home Builders Association from 1988 to 2000, its president in 2001 and 2002, and chairman of its board of directors from 2003 to 2004. In 2004 he received the association's Homebuilder of the Year award.

== Local government in South Windsor ==
Aman settled in South Windsor, Connecticut, where he served on the South Windsor Town Council from 1992 to 2004, and was mayor of the town in two separate terms, from 1995 to 1997 and again from 2001 to 2003. He also served as a justice of the peace for the state of Connecticut from 2002 to 2004, and sat on the town's Affordable Housing Task Force and Economic Development Commission.

== Connecticut House of Representatives ==
Aman was elected to the Connecticut House of Representatives for the 14th district, taking office on January 5, 2005, succeeding Nancy Kerensky. He was reelected repeatedly, including in 2008, when he defeated Democratic and Working Families candidate Kathy Hale by a vote of 7,168 to 5,961 after outraising her roughly six to one.

From 2010 he served as Assistant Minority Leader of the Connecticut House. During his legislative career he sat on the Appropriations Committee and served on subcommittees covering legislative affairs, regulation and protection, and results based accountability; and he also represented the House on the Capitol Region Council of Governments from 2001 to 2003. In 2015, Aman introduced an amendment to casino-related legislation aimed at ensuring local municipalities that oversaw casino property could negotiate with the state.

In April 2016 he announced he would not seek reelection after twelve years in office, and he left the House on January 4, 2017, succeeded by Tom Delnicki. Delnicki went on to win the open seat that year, defeating Saud Anwar, who ran unopposed in the Democratic primary.

== Personal life ==
Aman is Catholic and a member of Saint Margaret Mary's Church. He is married to his wife Marti and has two children, Bonnie and Jessica. He has coached South Windsor youth summer soccer and played rugby with the Connecticut Grey Rugby Football Club.
