= Kerensky (disambiguation) =

Alexander Kerensky (1881–1970) was the leader of Russia for three months in 1917.

Kerensky may also refer to:

- Oleg Kerensky (1905–1984), Alexander Kerensky's son and a civil engineer
- Nancy Kerensky (born 1943), American politician
- Kerensky, Alberta, a locality of Thorhild County
