= Christ Michael =

Christ Michael may refer to:

- Michael (archangel), considered as Christ prior to incarnation by some Christian groups
- Christ Michael, a figure in The Urantia Book

== See also ==
- Chris Michaels
- Michael A. Christ
- F. Michael Christ
