= Timothy Moynihan =

American politician (1941–2020)

Member of the Connecticut House of Representatives from the 10th district
- In office 1975–1986
- Preceded by: George W. Hannon Jr.
- Succeeded by: Gary Berner

Personal details
- Born: July 28, 1941 East Hartford, Connecticut, U.S.
- Died: March 1, 2020 (aged 78) Cape Coral, Florida, U.S.
- Party: Democratic
- Spouse: Rosemary Moynihan
- Education: Saint Michael's College

Timothy Joseph Moynihan (July 28, 1941 – March 1, 2020) was an American politician who served as a member of the Connecticut House of Representatives from 1975 to 1986.

== Education ==
Moynihan attended East Hartford High School and graduated from Saint Michael's College in 1963.

== Career ==
In 1965, Moynihan was elected to the East Hartford High School board of education, on which he served nine years, including five years as board chair. After nine years on the school board, Moynihan ran for the Connecticut House of Representatives as a Democrat. He represented Connecticut's 10th assembly district from 1975 to 1986. Moynihan also acted as an informal advisor to Governor William A. O'Neill. During his time in the House, Moynihan collaborated with other Connecticut politicians, including John B. Larson, Chris Dodd, and Richard Blumenthal.

After retiring from the state house, Moynihan served on the MetroHartford Chamber of Commerce. He left that position in 2001. Outside of politics, Moynihan was a real estate agent.

== Personal life ==
Moynihan's wife, Rosemary Moynihan, also served as a Connecticut state representative. Moynihan served in the United States Army reserve. He died in Cape Coral, Florida. He was 78 years old.
