= West Hartford Reservoir =

Recreation area in Connecticut, United States

Coordinates: 41.760°N 72.785°W

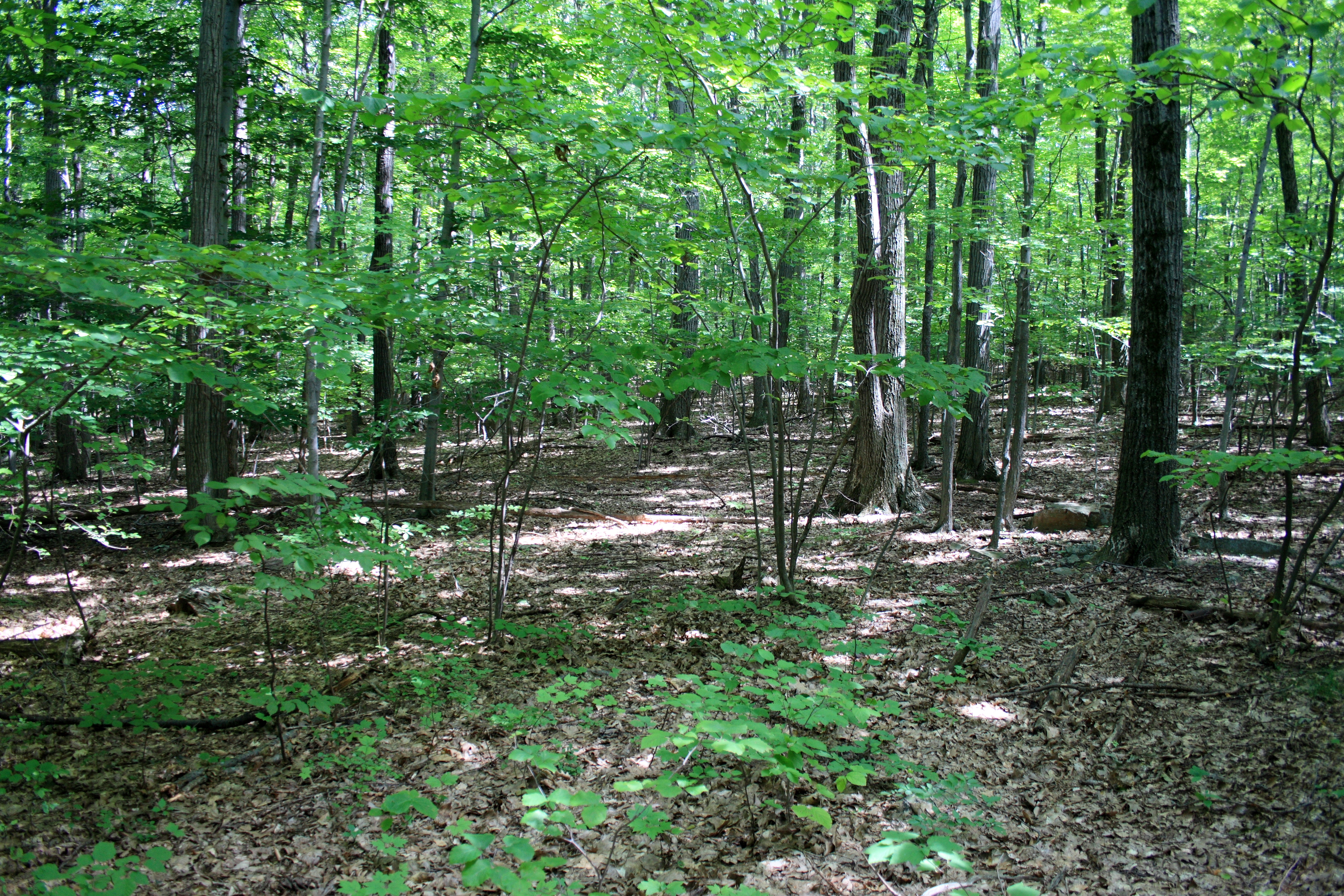
Woods of Rochambeau campsite in West Hartford, August 27, 2008

The West Hartford Reservoir recreation area is located on the western edge of West Hartford, Connecticut and 2.5 miles (4.0 km) northeast of Farmington, Connecticut. There are six large reservoirs along the eastern part of the park and a paved cycling trail that winds through the southern portion. The blue-blazed Metacomet Trail follows the highest ridge of the area and the network of trails throughout the area has led this to be a local mecca for mountain bikers, hikers, and trail-runners. The western edge is marked by Deer Cliff, a high rocky ledge that runs for about 1.5 miles (2.4 km) north-south. The Deer Cliff ledges have a long tradition of climbing routes for local mountaineers, but at this time the private access to the cliff base has been closed to the public. The Revolutionary War Campsite historical site is located near reservoir #6.

The property is owned by the Metropolitan District (The MDC), a non-profit municipal corporation chartered by the Connecticut General Assembly in 1929 to provide water and sewer services to the Hartford region.

In 2010 Travel and Leisure magazine described the Reservoir as "West Hartford’s version of Central Park” with nearly 30 miles of trail.

== Gallery ==
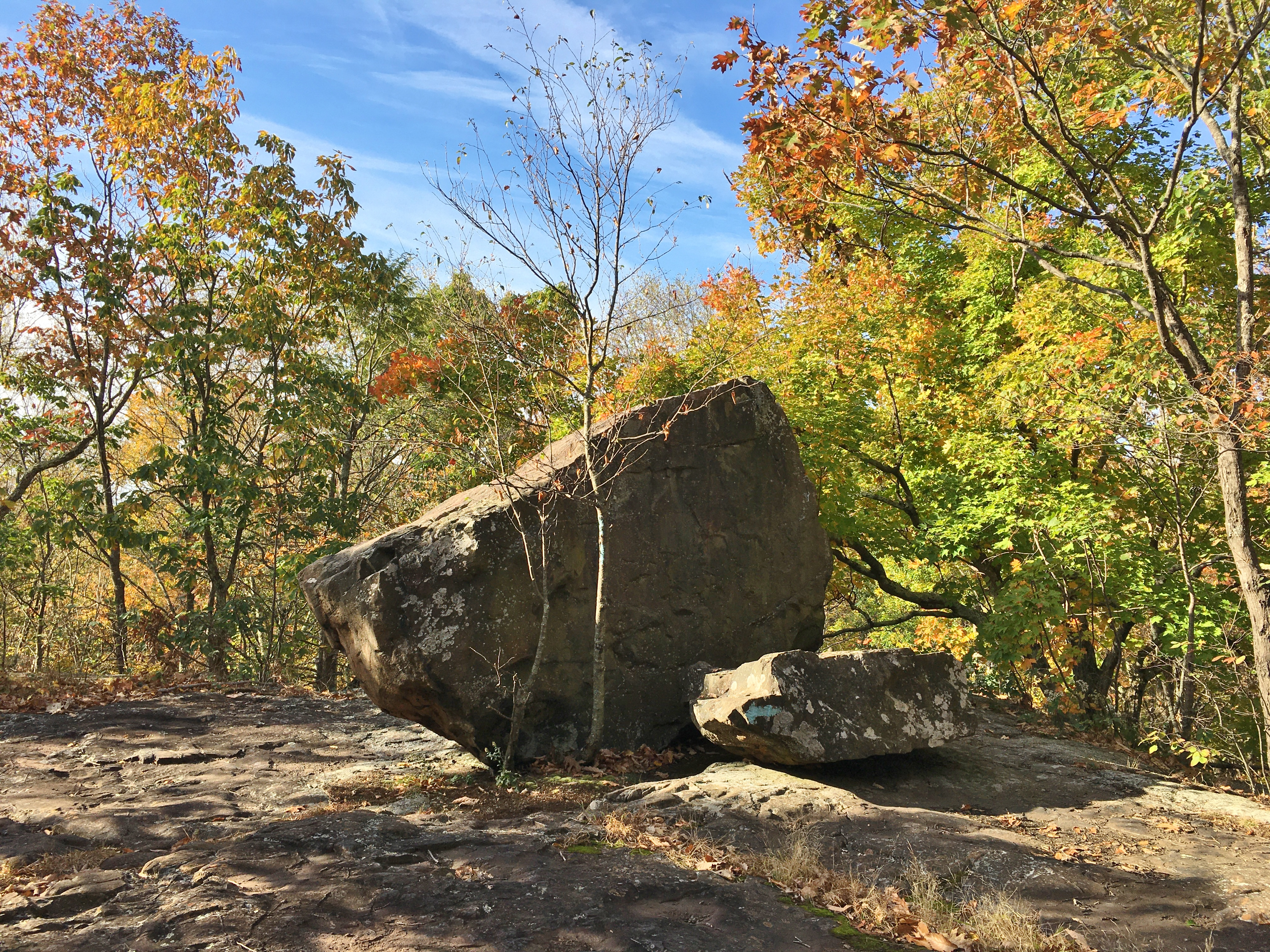
Large boulder atop Kilkenny Rock (October 2020)

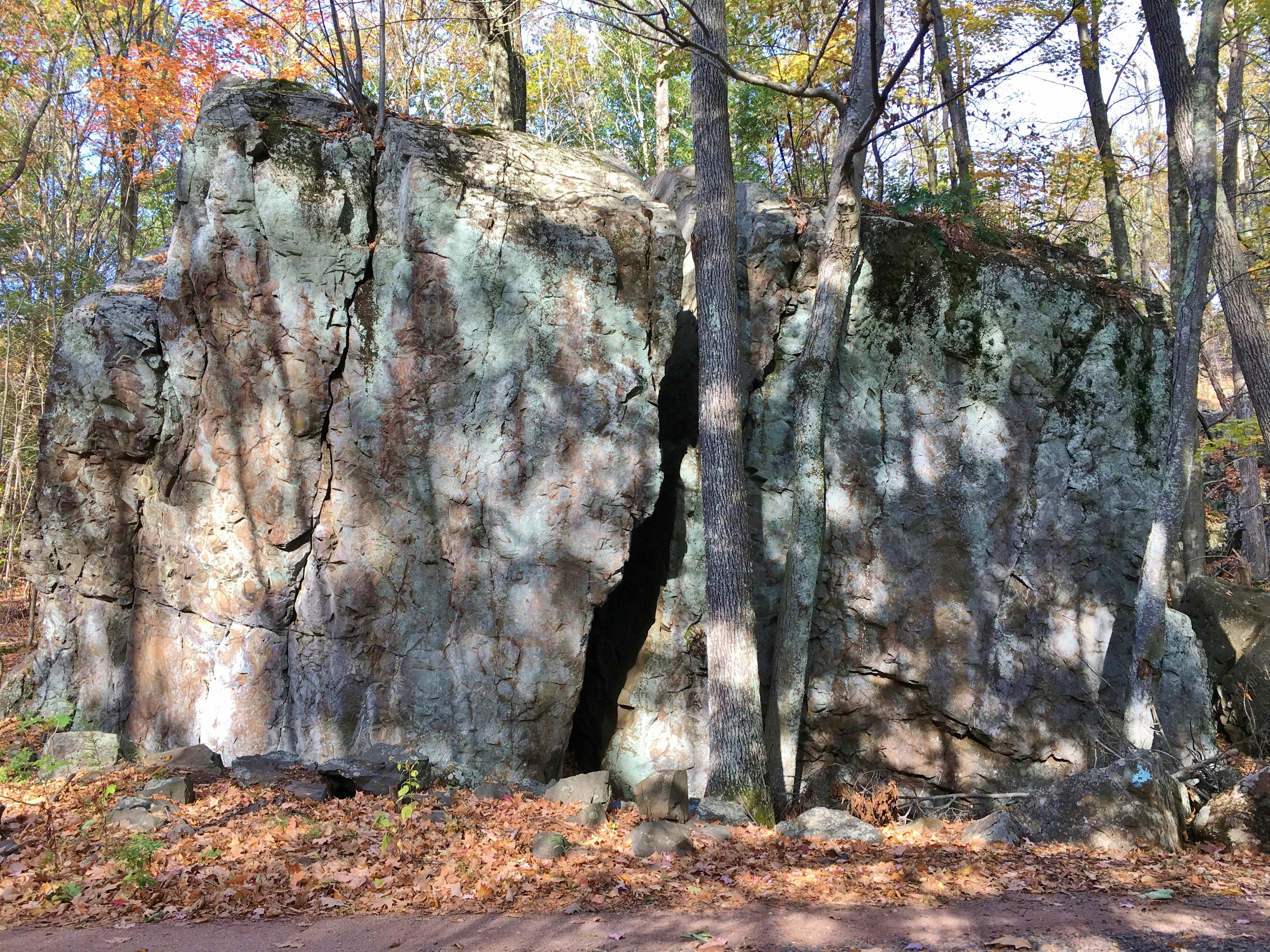
Split Rock, aka Dragon Rock - this is the view from the walking path (October 2020)

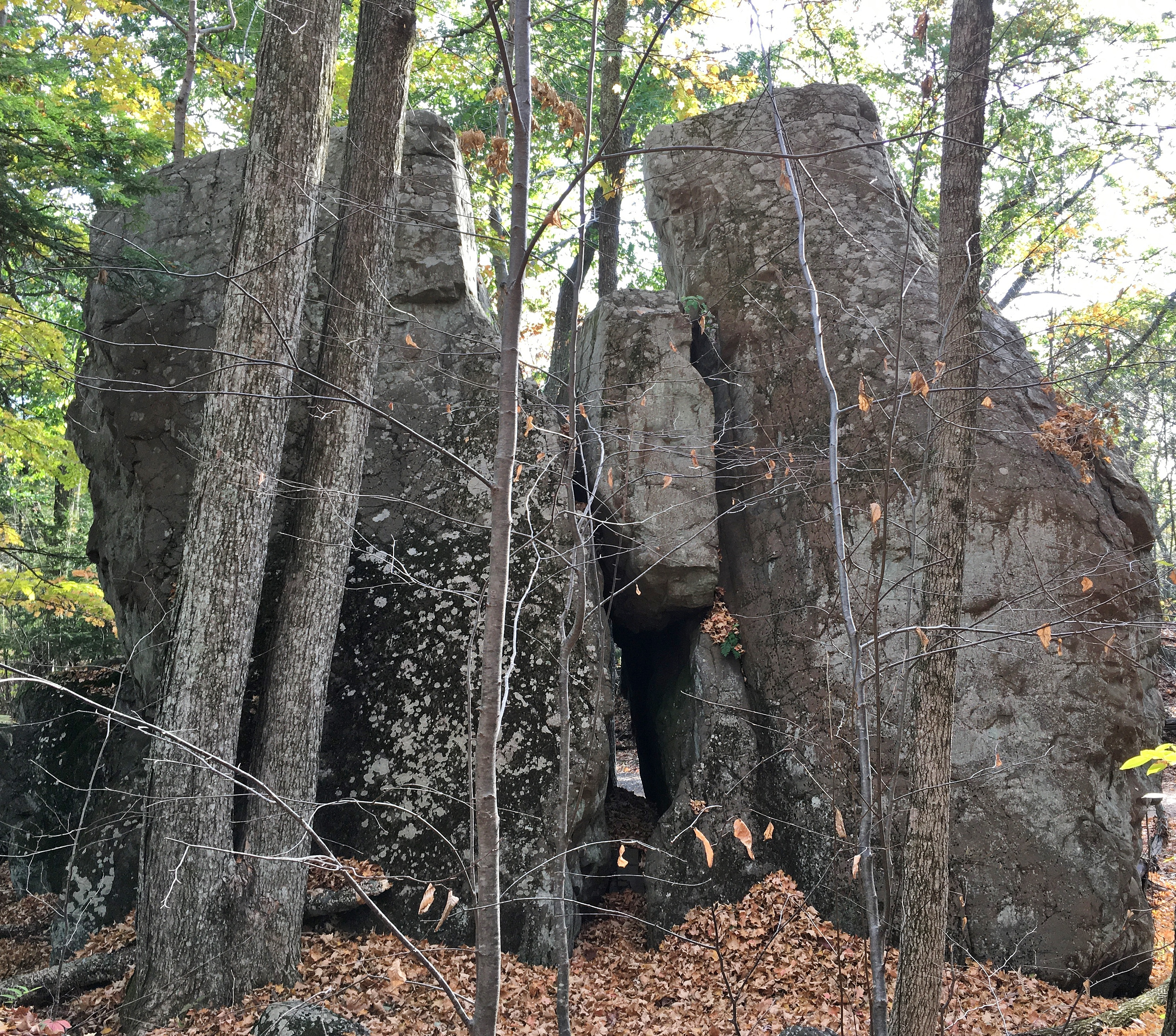
Dragon Rock, aka Split Rock - this is what the rock formation looks like from the woods (October 2020)

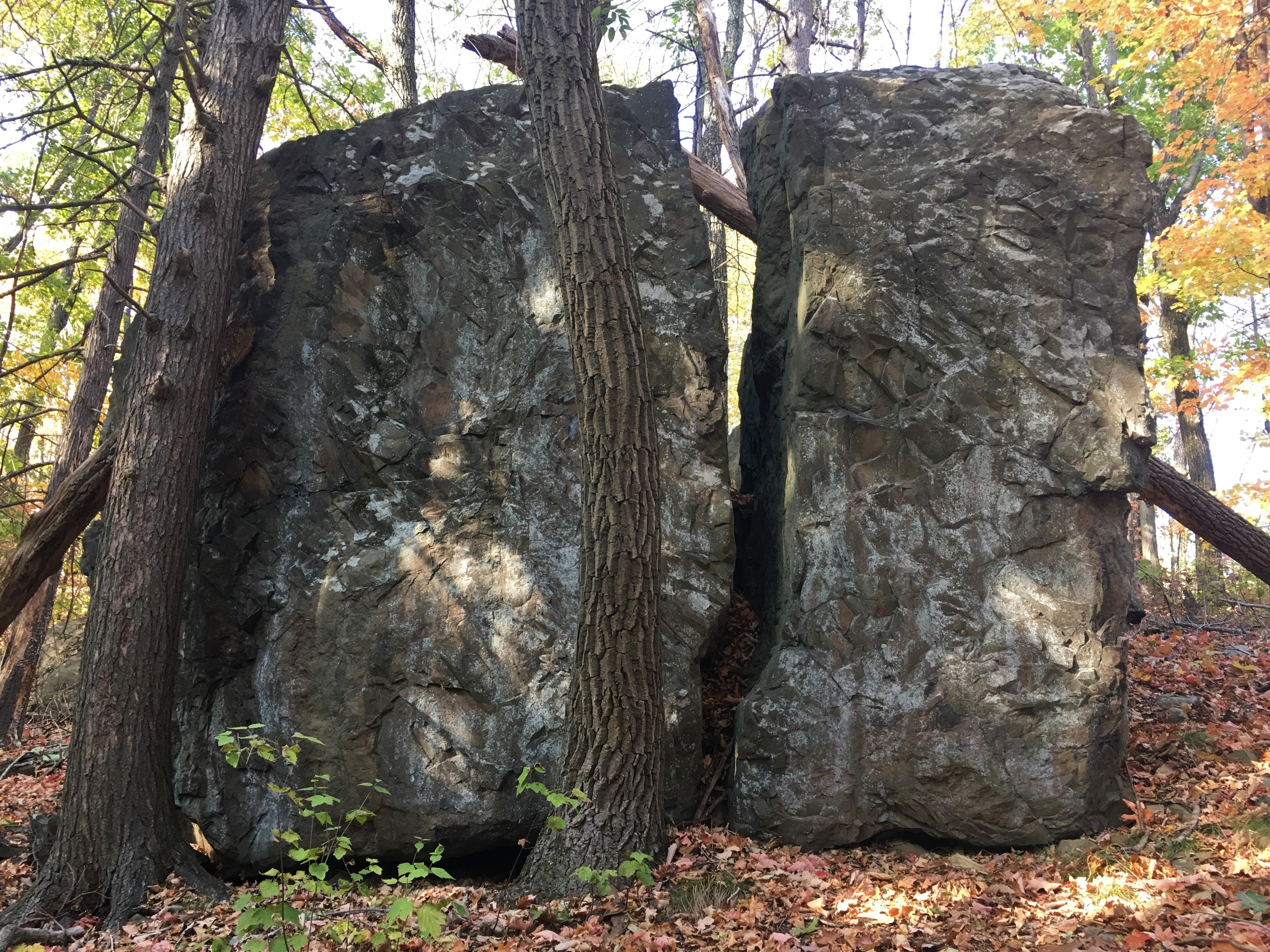
Cracked Rock (October 2020)

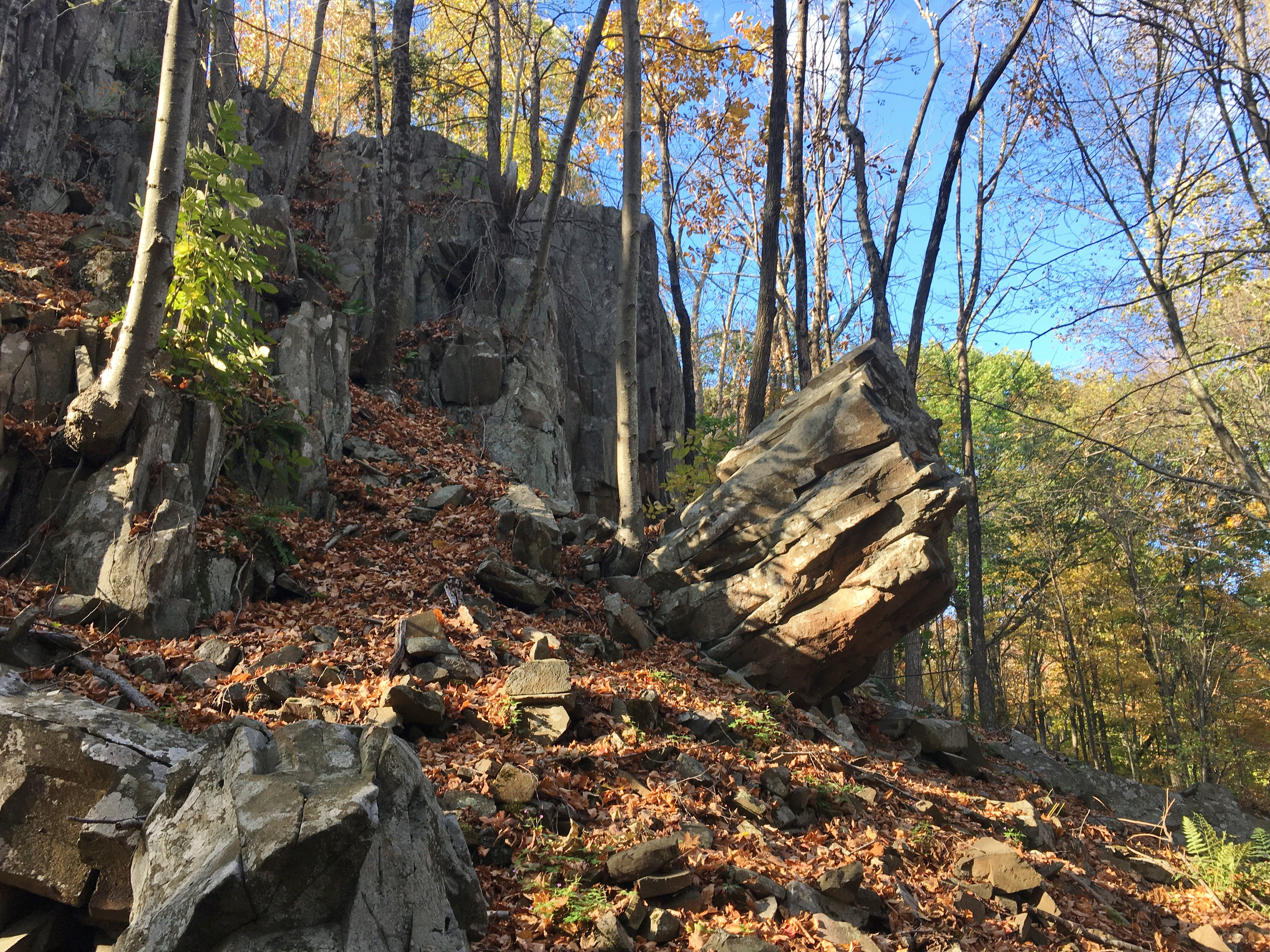
Crystal-shaped rock formation (October 2020)

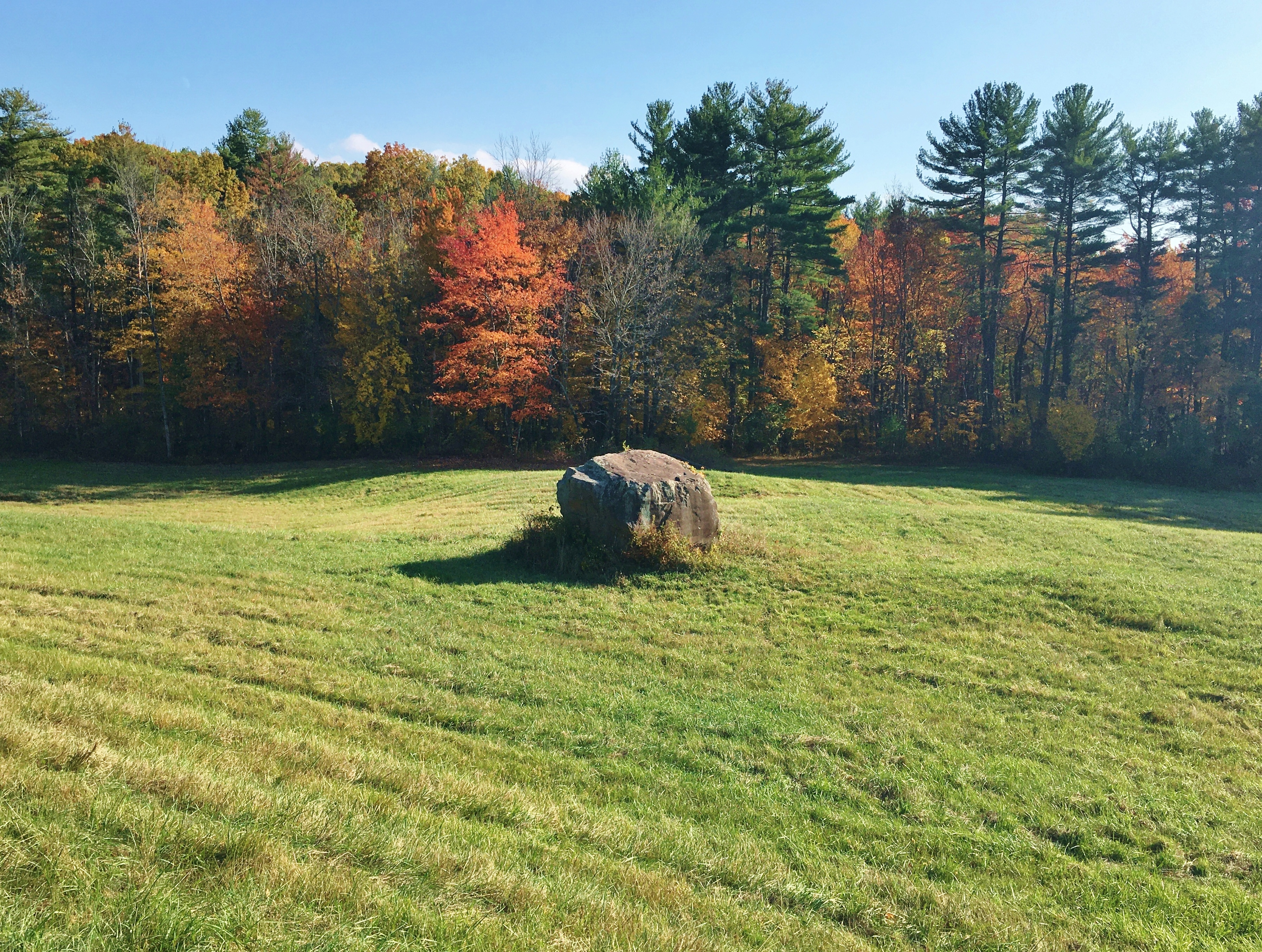
Large boulder in the West Hartford Reservoir (October 2020)

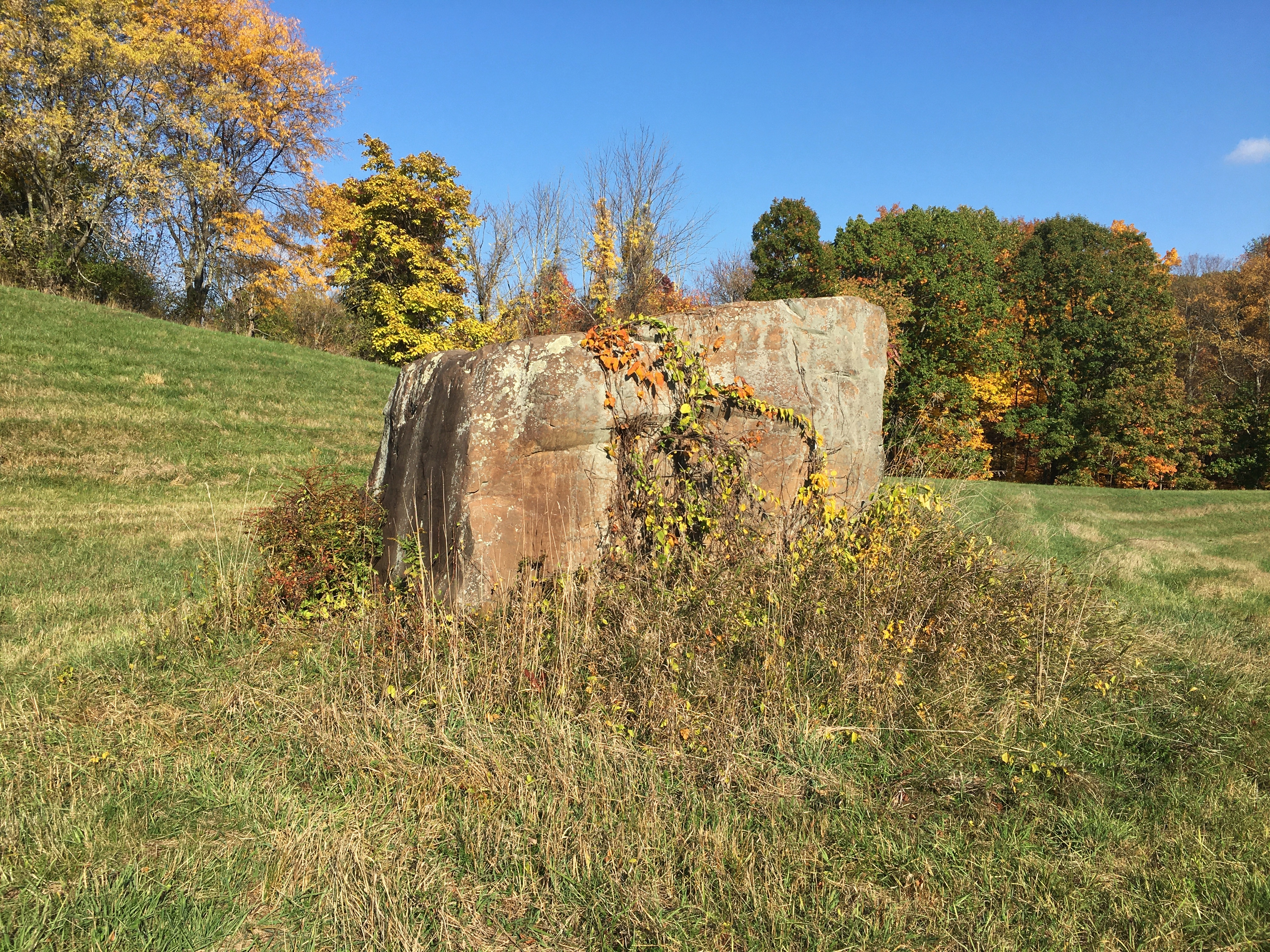
Another view of the same large boulder (October 2020)

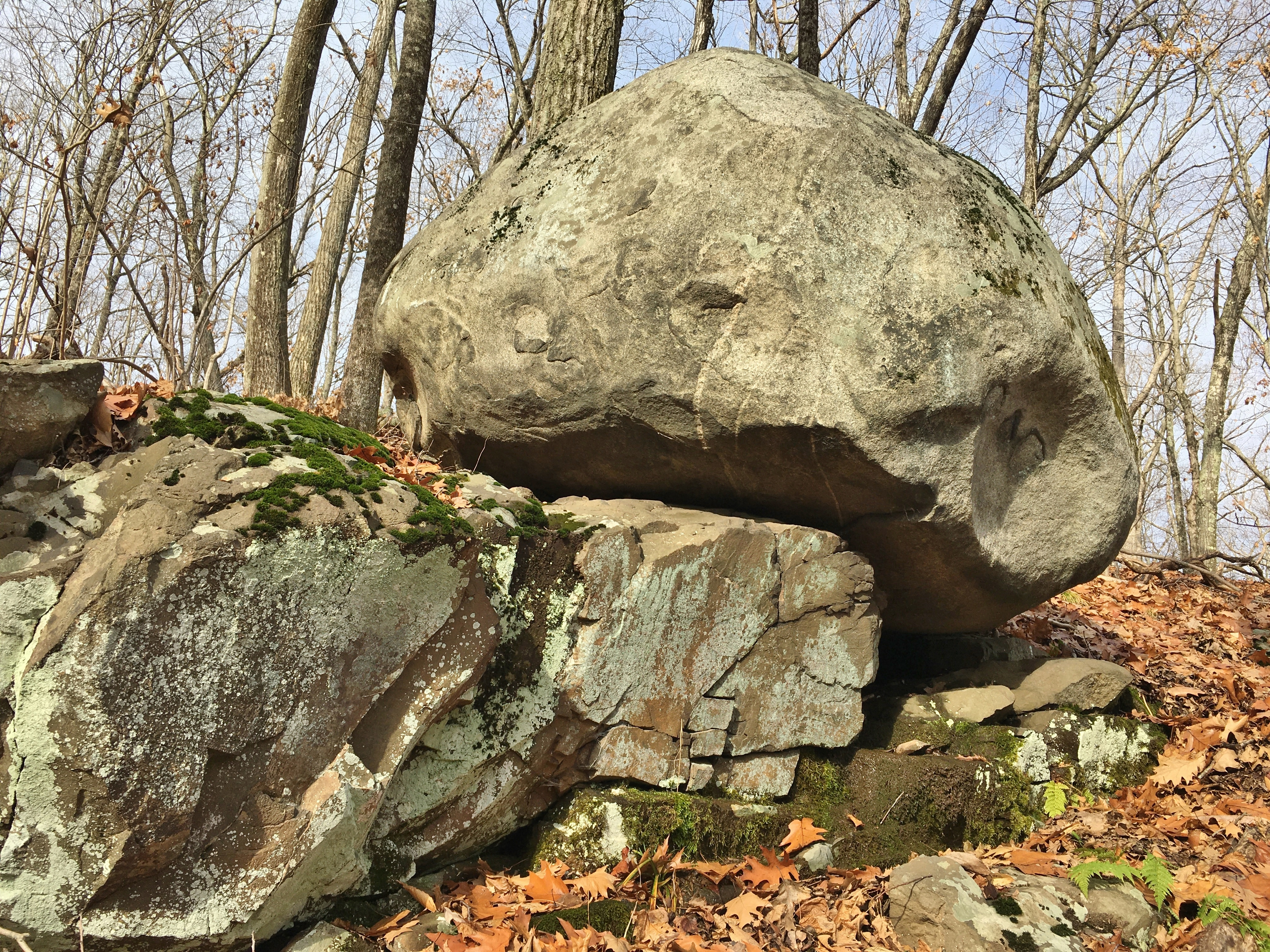
"Fish Rock" - a glacial erratic with a fish eye (November 2020)
