= Kevin Rennie =

American politician

Member of the Connecticut State Senate from the 3rd district
- In office January 4, 1995 – January 8, 1997
- Preceded by: John B. Larson
- Succeeded by: Gary LeBeau

Member of the Connecticut House of Representatives from the 14th district
- In office January 4, 1989 – January 4, 1995
- Preceded by: John J. Woodcock III
- Succeeded by: Nancy Kerensky

Personal details
- Born: August 28, 1958 (age 68) South Windsor, Connecticut, U.S.
- Party: Republican
- Education: Franklin & Marshall College (B.A.); University of Connecticut School of Law (J.D.)

Kevin Rennie (born August 28, 1958) is an American Republican politician who served in the Connecticut House of Representatives from the 14th district from 1989 to 1995 and in the Connecticut State Senate from the 3rd district from 1995 to 1997.

He is best known for his blog, Daily Runctions, which is one of the most well-known blogs in Connecticut covering state politics, and is a columnist for the Hartford Courant. He has also written for National Journal, New York Post, and RealClearPolitics.

== Early life and education ==
Kevin Rennie attended Franklin & Marshall College in Lancaster, Pennsylvania, graduating with an Bachelor of Arts in 1980. He subsequently attended the University of Connecticut School of Law, earning a Juris Doctor degree in 1983.

After graduating from law school, Rennie was admitted to the Connecticut bar in 1983. He began his legal career at the Hartford law firm Katz & Seligman, where he worked primarily on litigation and real estate matters. He later worked for a lawyer in South Windsor, Connecticut, before opening his own law office in 1987.

== Political career ==
Rennie entered electoral politics as a member of the Republican Party. In 1988, he was elected to the Connecticut House of Representatives from the 14th House District, defeating Democratic candidate John Woodcock by 131 votes. He took office in 1989 and was reelected twice, serving in the House until 1995. The district included parts of South Windsor and Vernon. During his tenure in the House, Rennie proposed amendments concerning the state's procedures for siting controversial land uses, including facilities associated with low-level radioactive waste disposal.

== Post-politics ==
After leaving the Connecticut Senate in 1997, Rennie returned to practicing law and later began a career in political writing. In 2002, he began writing a political column for Hartford Courant, initially for the newspaper's Northeast Magazine.

Rennie's column frequently focused on Connecticut politicians and state government.

In 2010, Rennie established Daily Ructions, a political news and commentary blog covering Connecticut politics. His blogging on former Governor Rowland's political and consulting activities was included in a Connecticut Mirror article about a grand jury investigation into Rowland's relationship with the 2012 congressional campaign of Lisa Wilson-Foley.

Rennie continued as a political columnist for The Hartford Courant while operating Daily Ructions. He has also appeared as a political commentator on Connecticut Public and other Connecticut media outlets.
