= Gary Berner =

American politician

Gary W. Berner

Member of the Connecticut House of Representatives from the 10th district
- In office 1987–1991
- Preceded by: Timothy Moynihan
- Succeeded by: Rosemary Moynihan

Personal details
- Party: Republican

Gary W. Berner is an American politician.

From 1987 to 1991, Gary Berner was a member of the Connecticut House of Representatives for the 10th district. Elected as a Republican, he succeeded Timothy Moynihan and was replaced by Rosemary Moynihan. Berner contested the 10th district seat in 1992, and lost to Melody Currey. After stepping down from the state legislature, Berner served as a legislative liaison for governors Jodi Rell and Dannel Malloy. Berner retired from public service in 2016.
