= Nepaug River =

Nepaug River Nepash River
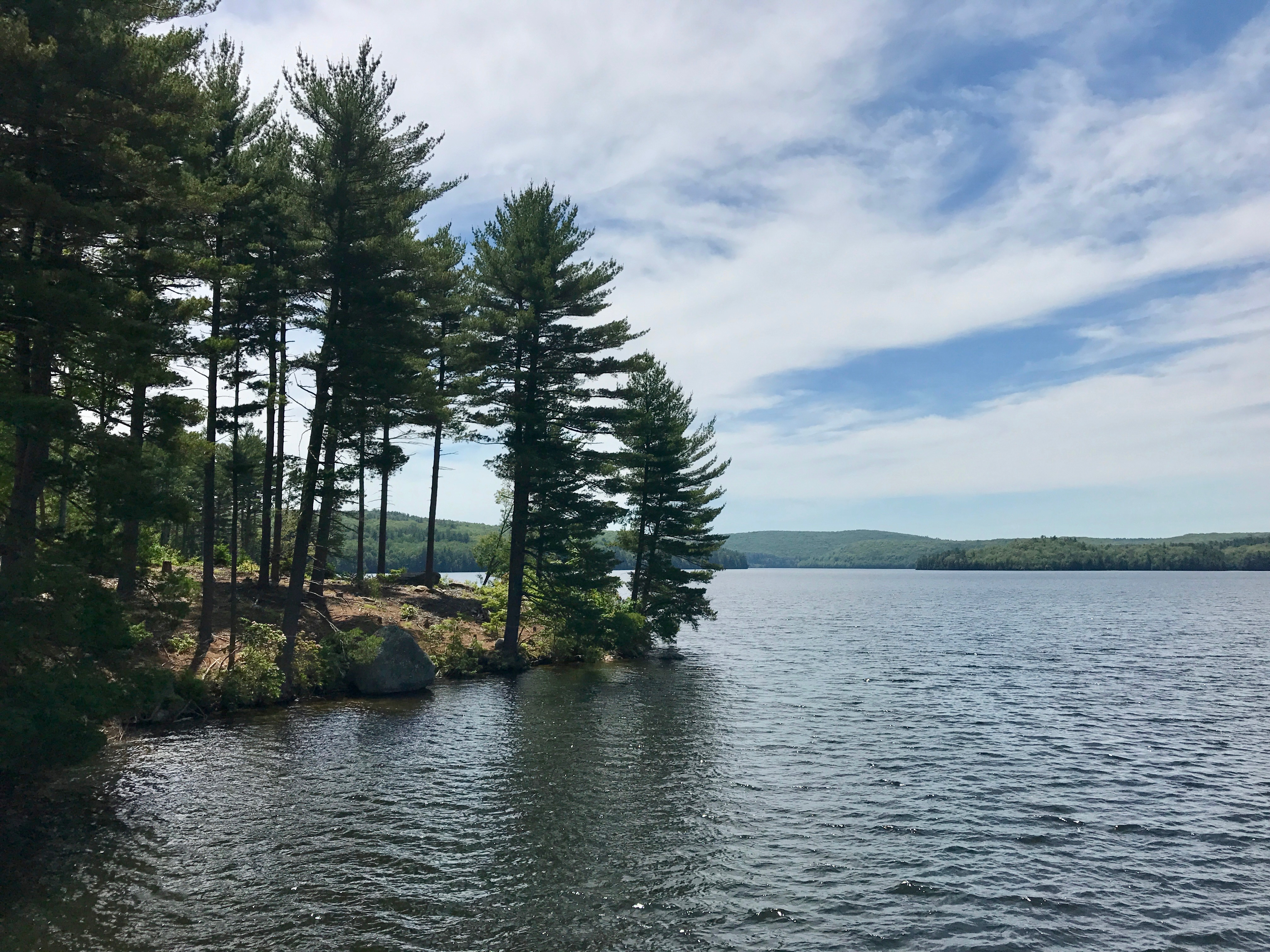
- View of the Nepaug Reservoir facing south from the Nepaug Dam in New Hartford, Connecticut.
- Native name: Nepash (Sicaog); Nepaug (Quiripi)

Location
- Country: United States
- State: Connecticut

Physical characteristics
- Source: North Nepaug Brook
  - location: Bakerville, Litchfield County, Connecticut
- 2nd source: Cedar Swamp Brook
  - location: Bakerville, Litchfield County, Connecticut
- 3rd source: Nepaug Reservoir
- Source confluence: confluence of North Nepaug Brook and Cedar Swamp Brook
  - location: New Hartford, Litchfield County, Connecticut
- Mouth: confluence with Farmington River
  - location: Collinsville, Hartford County, Connecticut
  - coordinates: 41°49′41.0″N 72°55′45.5″W
- Length: 10.6 mi (17.1 km), from confluence of North Nepaug Brook and Cedar Swamp Brook to mouth.

The Nepaug River begins at the confluence of North Nepaug Brook and Cedar Swamp Brook about one mile (1.6 km) east of Bakerville, Connecticut.

It runs for 10.6 miles (17.1 km) to the Farmington River about one-half a mile (0.80 km) south of Cherry Brook, Connecticut.

A popular whitewater paddling route begins along Dings Road about one-tenth of a mile (0.16 km) downstream from the start of the Nepaug River. This river run is between Class I-II whitewater until the U.S. Route 202 bridge. The river then enters the Nepaug Reservoir at the northwest corner.

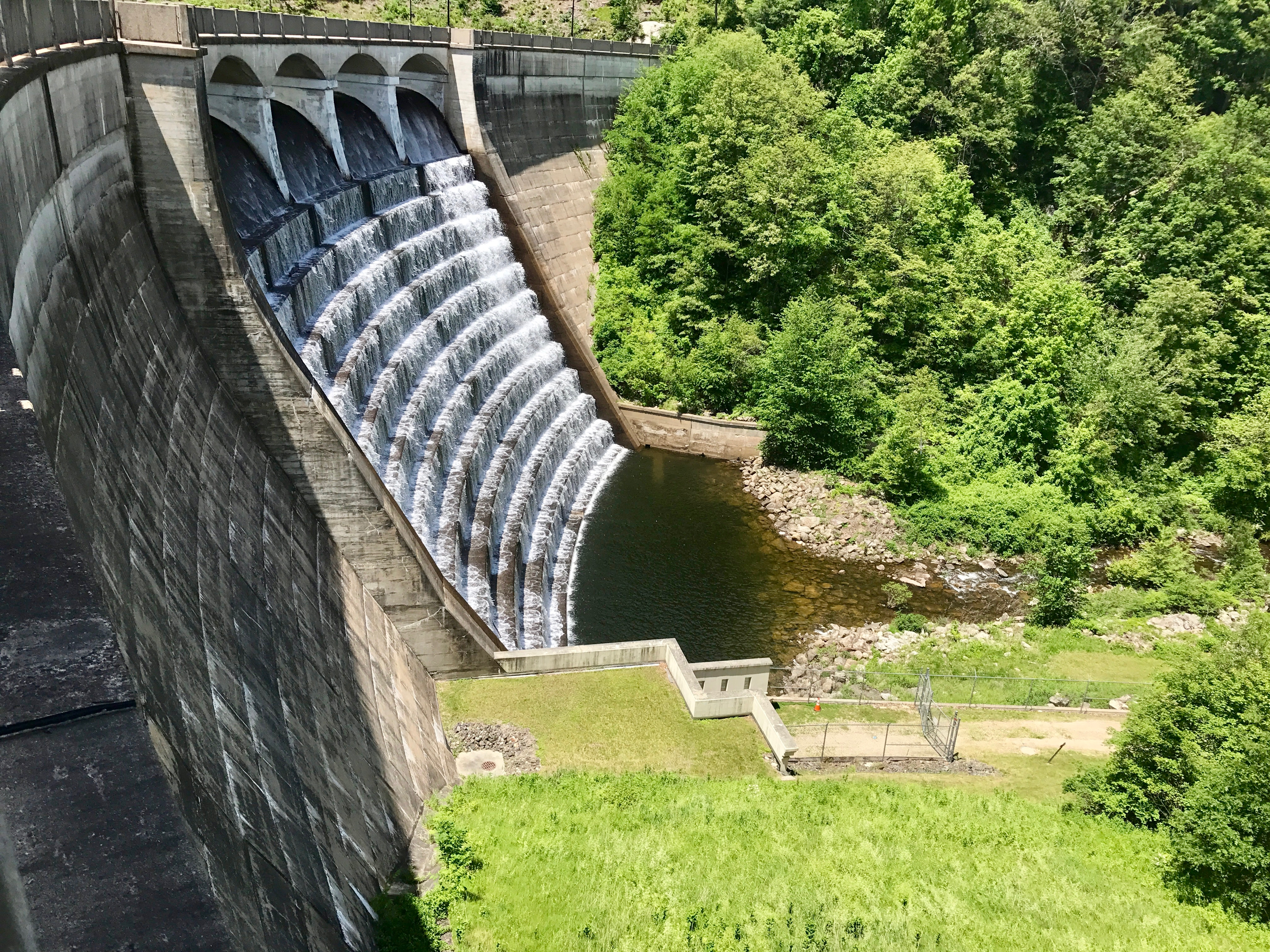
The Nepaug Dam allows water to flow out of the Nepaug Reservoir.

The Nepaug Reservoir was created by the Nepaug Dam which is located at the northwest corner of the reservoir and is approximately one mile (1.6 km) from the Farmington River. The final section of the Nepaug River carries the overflow from the Nepaug Dam east to the Farmington River at Collinsville (near Cherry Brook, Connecticut). The Reservoir is managed by the Metropolitan District Commission.

The Nepaug Reservoir is approximately two miles (3.2 km) long from north to south and approximately one mile (1.6 km) wide from east to west.

== See also ==
- List of rivers of Connecticut
