= Patrick Biggins =

American politician

Member of the Connecticut House of Representatives from the 11th district
- Incumbent
- Assumed office January 8, 2025
- Preceded by: Jeffrey Currey

Personal details
- Born: 1985 (age 40–41)
- Party: Democratic Party

Patrick Biggins is an American politician and member of the Connecticut House of Representatives since 2024 from the 11th district, which contains parts of the towns of East Hartford, Manchester, and South Windsor.
