= Angie Parkinson =

American politician

Member-elect of the Connecticut House of Representatives from the 10th district
- Assuming office January 2027
- Succeeding: Henry Genga

Personal details
- Party: Democratic
- Website: Campaign website

Angie Parkinson is an American politician. A member of the Democratic Party, she is the member-elect for the 10th district of the Connecticut House of Representatives. She defeated Tyron Harris in the Democratic primary for the 2026 election.
