= Rosemary Moynihan =

American politician (born 1943)

Member of the Connecticut House of Representatives from the 10th district
- In office 1991–1993
- Preceded by: Gary Berner
- Succeeded by: Melody Currey

Personal details
- Born: February 15, 1943 (age 83)
- Party: Democratic
- Spouse: Timothy Moynihan

Rosemary L. Moynihan (born February 15, 1943) is an American politician who served in the Connecticut House of Representatives from 1991 to 1993, representing the 10th district.

== Career ==
Moynihan lived in East Hartford, Connecticut. She was a member of the advisory council of the Connecticut State University Center for Educational Excellence until December 1989, when she was appointed to the university's board of regents. She resigned from the board of regents on December 4, 1990, upon her election to the Connecticut House of Representatives as a Democrat. She was elected to the state house from the 10th district, and served through 1993. Moynihan was succeeded in office by Melody Currey.

== Family ==
Her husband was Timothy Moynihan who also served in the Connecticut General Assembly.
