= John B. Larson =

American politician and businessman (born 1948)

John Larson
- Official portrait, 2012

Member of the U.S. House of Representatives from Connecticut's 1st district
- Incumbent
- Assumed office January 3, 1999
- Preceded by: Barbara Kennelly
House positions
Chair of the House Democratic Caucus
In office January 3, 2009 – January 3, 2013
Leader	Nancy Pelosi
Preceded by	Rahm Emanuel
Succeeded by	Xavier Becerra
Vice Chair of the House Democratic Caucus
In office January 17, 2006 – January 3, 2009
Leader	Nancy Pelosi
Preceded by	Jim Clyburn
Succeeded by	Xavier Becerra
Ranking Member of the House Administration Committee
In office January 3, 2003 – January 3, 2005
Preceded by	Steny Hoyer
Succeeded by	Juanita Millender-McDonald

President pro tempore of the Connecticut Senate
- In office January 7, 1987 – January 4, 1995
- Preceded by: Philip Robertson
- Succeeded by: M. Adela Eads

Member of the Connecticut State Senate from the 3rd district
- In office January 5, 1983 – January 4, 1995
- Preceded by: Marcella Fahey
- Succeeded by: Kevin Rennie

Personal details
- Born: John Barry Larson; July 22, 1948 (age 78) Hartford, Connecticut, U.S.
- Party: Democratic
- Spouse: Leslie Best (m. 1981)
- Children: 3
- Relatives: Tim Larson (brother)
- Education: Central Connecticut State University (BA)
- Website: House website Campaign website
- Larson's voice Larson honoring Gabby Giffords after the 2011 Tucson shooting Recorded January 12, 2011

John Barry Larson (born July 22, 1948) is an American politician and businessman who has been serving as the U.S. representative for Connecticut's 1st congressional district since 1999. The district is based in the state capital, Hartford. A member of the Democratic Party, Larson chaired the House Democratic Caucus during the 111th and 112th United States Congress.

Larson was first elected to Congress in 1998, serving fourteen consecutive terms in the House. He attempted to seek a fifteenth term, but he was defeated in the 2026 Democratic primary by former Hartford mayor Luke Bronin.

== Early life, education, and career ==
Larson was born in Hartford, but has spent most of his life in nearby East Hartford. He grew up in a public housing project. He attended East Hartford High School and Central Connecticut State University. He worked as a high school history teacher and an assistant athletics coach at George J. Penney High School (Penney High later merged with East Hartford High School).

Larson began his career as the co-owner of an insurance agency in East Hartford before entering public service. In 1971, he was selected as a Senior Fellow to the Yale University Bush Center in Child Development and Social Policy by Head Start Program founder Edward Zigler.

== Early political career ==
He transitioned into politics in 1977, when he served one term on the East Hartford Board of Education. He then served two terms on the East Hartford Town Council.

In 1982, Larson was elected to the Connecticut State Senate from the 3rd district, based in East Hartford. He served six terms in that body, the last four as president pro tempore.

In 1994, Larson left the state senate and sought the Democratic nomination for governor of Connecticut, losing to Bill Curry in the primary. After being defeated for governor, Larson entered private business for several years but was able to maintain his political credentials.

== U.S. House of Representatives ==
=== Elections ===
In 1998, Larson ran for Connecticut's 1st congressional district. Incumbent representative Barbara B. Kennelly ran for governor rather than seeking another term in office. In the Democratic primary, Larson narrowly defeated Connecticut secretary of state Miles S. Rapoport. The district has long been the most Democratic in Connecticut, and Larson's victory in November was a foregone conclusion. He has since been re-elected eleven times without substantive opposition.

==== 2026 ====
In 2026, Larson faced serious challengers in the Democratic primary for the first time since his 1998 election. Larson rejected calls to retire and concerns over his age after suffering a complex partial seizure on the House floor in February 2025. House minority leader Hakeem Jeffries has said that he "strongly" supported Larson's re-election. On May 11, 2026, Larson lost the Democratic Party of Connecticut endorsement to former Hartford mayor Luke Bronin. He then subsequently lost the primary to Bronin, held on August 11, by over 20 points.

=== Caucus leadership ===
On February 1, 2006, Larson was elected vice chair of the House Democratic Caucus to succeed Jim Clyburn, who was elevated to chair. After the caucus won control of the House in the 2006 elections, Clyburn was elevated to majority whip. However, Larson opted not to run for chair, and Clyburn was succeeded by Rahm Emanuel. After the 2008 elections, Emanuel became White House Chief of Staff and Larson was elected caucus chair. He served as chair for two terms before leaving the party leadership.

=== Tenure ===
==== Energy and the environment ====
Larson has introduced various pieces of legislation in attempts to nationalize the US's energy and to reduce greenhouse gas emissions in order to protect the environment. He cosponsored the Energy Independence and Security Act of 2007 "to move the United States toward greater energy independence and security, to increase the production of clean renewable fuels, to protect consumers, to increase the efficiency of products, buildings, and vehicles, to promote research on and deploy greenhouse gas capture and storage options, and to improve the energy performance of the Federal Government, and for other purposes." According to Larson, "I have become convinced of the need for comprehensive legislation to reduce the amount of greenhouse gases we are emitting into the environment." His stances on environmental protection have earned him a rating of 100% with the League of Conservation Voters.

==== Economic issues ====
In 2010, Larson introduced the Small Business Jobs Act of 2010, authorizing the creation of the Small Business Lending Fund Program administered by the Treasury Department to make capital investments in eligible institutions, in order to increase the availability of credit for small businesses. Larson was a strong advocate for the American Recovery and Reinvestment Act of 2009, which increased federal spending in infrastructure, education, health and energy while expanding some welfare and social security programs. His liberal stance on government spending has earned him a rating of 9% with Citizens Against Government Waste, a conservative anti-government spending interest group.

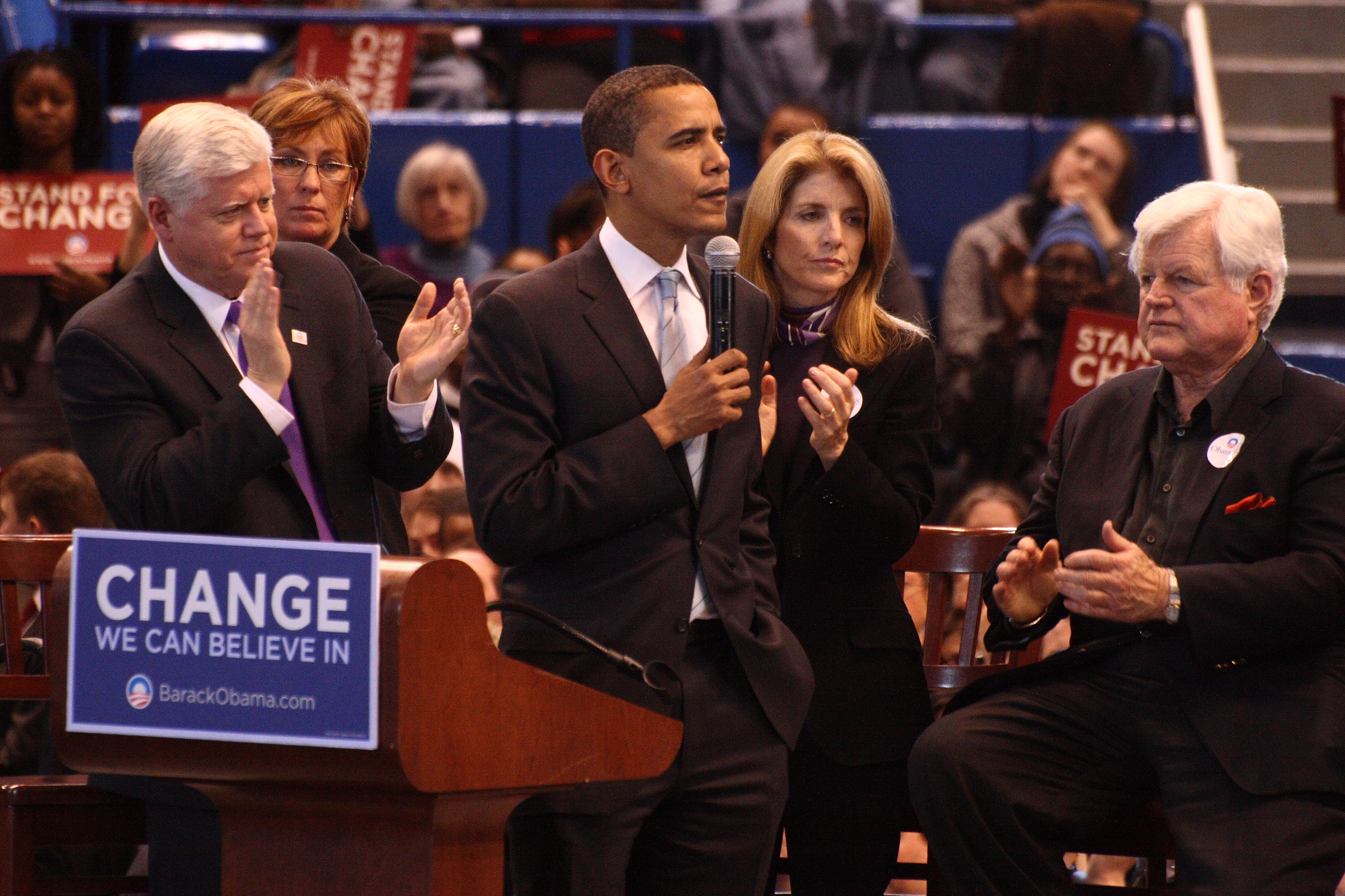
Larson with then-Senator and presidential candidate Barack Obama, Caroline Kennedy, and Senator Ted Kennedy on February 4, 2008

Larson received media attention for scolding members of Congress for shutting down the government on September 30, 2013.

Larson was among the 46 Democrats who voted against final passage of the Fiscal Responsibility Act of 2023 in the House.

==== Social issues ====
Larson has consistently voted both to legalize same-sex marriage and to expand options for legal abortion. He voted to repeal the military's "don't ask, don't tell" policy, and in favor of the Sexual Orientation Employment Nondiscrimination Act (ENDA). The Human Rights Campaign gave Larson a rating of 94%. Larson voted against ending federal funding to Planned Parenthood; consequently, both Planned Parenthood and NARAL Pro-Choice American gave him a rating of 100%.

==== Checks and balances ====
In March 2025 Larson showed visible frustration at Elon Musk's failure to appear before the House Ways and Means Committee and answer DOGE data transparency questions.

On April 6, 2026, Larson filed articles of impeachment against President Donald Trump.

=== Committee assignments ===
For the 119th Congress:

- Committee on Ways and Means
  - Subcommittee on Social Security (Ranking Member)
  - Subcommittee on Trade

=== Caucus memberships ===
- Congressional Shellfish Caucus (co-chair)
- House Hydrogen and Fuel Cell Coalition (co-chair)
- House Baltic Caucus
- Congressional Arts Caucus
- Afterschool Caucuses
- Black Maternal Health Caucus
- Congressional Equality Caucus
- Congressional NextGen 9-1-1 Caucus
- United States Congressional International Conservation Caucus
- Climate Solutions Caucus
- Congressional Ukraine Caucus
- Congressional Wildlife Refuge Caucus
- Blue Collar Caucus
- Congressional Blockchain Caucus
- Rare Disease Caucus

== Personal life ==
Larson is married to Leslie Best. They have three children and reside in East Hartford.

On February 11, 2025, while speaking on the floor of the House, Larson froze for about 30 seconds mid-sentence. His office later responded that it was likely an "adverse reaction" to new medication, and underwent tests conducted by the Attending Physician of the United States Congress. His office later clarified that Larson had experienced a complex partial seizure caused by a heart valve replacement fifteen years earlier. Larson returned to his duties and was present for voting on the House floor on February 13.

== Electoral history ==
=== Connecticut State Senate ===
1982 Democratic primary
Party	Candidate	Votes	%
Democratic	John Larson	4,147	54.15%
Democratic	Marcella Fahey (incumbent)	3,511	45.85%
Total votes		7,658	100%

Connecticut's 3rd senate district results, 1982
Party	Candidate	Votes	%
Democratic	John Larson	18,402	62.49%
Republican	Kevin Norige	11,047	37.51%
Total votes		29,449	100%
Democratic hold			

Connecticut's 3rd senate district results, 1984
Party	Candidate	Votes	%
Democratic	John Larson (incumbent)	21,635	55.21%
Republican	Kathleen O'Leary McGuire	17,553	44.79%
Total votes		39,188	100%
Democratic hold			

Connecticut's 3rd senate district results, 1986
Party	Candidate	Votes	%
Democratic	John Larson (incumbent; unopposed)	20,316	100.00%
Total votes		20,316	100%
Democratic hold			

Connecticut's 3rd senate district results, 1988
Party	Candidate	Votes	%
Democratic	John Larson (incumbent)	27,793	72.24%
Republican	Joseph Roberts	10,678	27.76%
Total votes		38,471	100%
Democratic hold			

Connecticut's 3rd senate district results, 1990
Party	Candidate	Votes	%
Democratic	John Larson (incumbent)	21,307	68.78%
Republican	Debra Gaudette	9,672	31.22%
Total votes		30,979	100%
Democratic hold			

Connecticut's 3rd senate district results, 1992
Party	Candidate	Votes	%
Democratic	John Larson (incumbent)	26,623	70.59%
Republican	Peter Nevers	11,091	29.41%
Total votes		37,714	100%
Democratic hold			

=== Connecticut Governor ===
Connecticut gubernatorial Democratic primary results, 1994
Party	Candidate	Votes	%
Democratic	Bill Curry	93,241	54.72%
Democratic	John B. Larson	77,165	45.28%
Total votes		170,406	100.00%

=== U.S. House of Representatives ===
Connecticut's 1st congressional district Democratic primary results, 1998
Party	Candidate	Votes	%
Democratic	John Larson	19,877	46.42%
Democratic	Miles S. Rapoport	18,189	42.48%
Democratic	Jim McCavanagh	2,565	6.00%
Democratic	Joseph M. Suggs Jr.	2,185	5.10%
Total votes		42,816	100.00%

Connecticut's 1st congressional district results, 1998
Party	Candidate	Votes	%
Democratic	John Larson	97,681	58.05%
Republican	Kevin O'Connor	69,668	41.40%
Term Limits	Jay E. Palmieri, IV	915	0.54%
Total votes		168,264	100%
Democratic hold			

Connecticut's 1st congressional district results, 2000
Party	Candidate	Votes	%
Democratic	John Larson (incumbent)	151,932	71.92%
Republican	Bob Backlund	59,331	28.08%
Total votes		211,263	100%
Democratic hold			

Connecticut's 1st congressional district results, 2002
Party	Candidate	Votes	%
Democratic	John Larson (incumbent)	134,698	66.79%
Republican	Phil Steele	66,968	33.21%
Total votes		201,666	100%
Democratic hold			

Connecticut's 1st congressional district results, 2004
Party	Candidate	Votes	%
Democratic	John Larson (incumbent)	198,802	72.98%
Republican	John Halstead	73,601	27.02%
Total votes		272,403	100%
Democratic hold			

Connecticut's 1st congressional district results, 2006
Party	Candidate	Votes	%
Democratic	John Larson (incumbent)	154,539	74.44%
Republican	Scott MacLean	53,010	25.54%
Write-in		43	0.02%
Total votes		207,592	100%
Democratic hold			

Connecticut's 1st congressional district results, 2008
Party	Candidate	Votes	%
Democratic	John Larson	194,493	65.81%
Working Families	John Larson	17,000	5.75%
Total	John Larson (incumbent)	211,493	71.56%
Republican	Joe Visconti	76,860	26.01%
Green	Stephen Fournier	7,201	2.44%
Write-in		3	0.00%
Total votes		295,557	100%
Democratic hold			

Connecticut's 1st congressional district results, 2010
Party	Candidate	Votes	%
Democratic	John Larson	130,538	57.75%
Working Families	John Larson	7,902	3.50%
Total	John Larson (incumbent)	138,440	61.25%
Republican	Ann Brickley	84,076	37.20%
Green	Kenneth Krayeske	2,564	1.34%
Socialist Action	Christopher Hutchinson	955	0.42%
Write-in		3	0.00%
Total votes		226,038	100%
Democratic hold			

Connecticut's 1st congressional district results, 2012
Party	Candidate	Votes	%
Democratic	John Larson	192,840	64.92%
Working Families	John Larson	14,133	4.76%
Total	John Larson (incumbent)	206,973	69.67%
Republican	John Henry Decker	82,321	27.71%
Green	S. Michael DeRosa	5,477	1.84%
Independent	Matthew Corey	2,290	0.77%
Total votes		297,061	100%
Democratic hold			

Connecticut's 1st congressional district results, 2014
Party	Candidate	Votes	%
Democratic	John Larson	127,430	58.49%
Working Families	John Larson	8,395	3.85%
Total	John Larson (incumbent)	135,825	62.34%
Republican	Matthew Corey	78,609	36.08%
Green	Jeffery Russell	3,447	1.58%
Total votes		217,881	100%
Democratic hold			

Connecticut's 1st congressional district results, 2016
Party	Candidate	Votes	%
Democratic	John Larson	187,021	59.77%
Working Families	John Larson	13,665	4.37%
Total	John Larson (incumbent)	200,686	64.13%
Republican	Matthew Corey	105,674	33.77%
Green	S. Michael DeRosa	6,563	2.10%
Write-in		2	0.00%
Total votes		312,925	100%
Democratic hold			

Connecticut's 1st congressional district results, 2018
Party	Candidate	Votes	%
Democratic	John Larson	166,155	60.61%
Working Families	John Larson	8,932	3.26%
Total	John Larson (incumbent)	175,087	63.87%
Republican	Jennifer Nye	96,024	35.03%
Green	Tom McCormick	3,029	1.10%
Total votes		274,140	100%
Democratic hold			

Connecticut's 1st congressional district results, 2020
Party	Candidate	Votes	%
Democratic	John Larson	213,001	60.99%
Working Families	John Larson	9,667	2.77%
Total	John Larson (incumbent)	222,668	63.76%
Republican	Mary Fay	122,111	34.97%
Green	Tom McCormick	4,458	1.28%
Total votes		349,237	100%
Democratic hold			

Connecticut's 1st congressional district results, 2022
Party	Candidate	Votes	%
Democratic	John Larson	144,873	59.40%
Working Families	John Larson	4,683	1.92%
Total	John Larson (incumbent)	149,556	61.32%
Republican	Larry Lazor	91,506	37.52%
Green	Mary Sanders	2,851	1.17%
Total votes		243,913	100%
Democratic hold			

Connecticut's 1st congressional district results, 2024
Party	Candidate	Votes	%
Democratic	John Larson	197,788	59.85%
Working Families	John Larson	10,861	3.29%
Total	John Larson (incumbent)	208,649	63.13%
Republican	Jim Griffin	115,065	34.82%
Green	Mary Sanders	6,768	2.05%
Total votes		330,482	100%
Democratic hold			

Connecticut State Senate
Preceded by Philip Robertson	President pro tempore of the Connecticut Senate; 1987–1995	Succeeded by Dell Eads
U.S. House of Representatives
Preceded by Barbara Kennelly	Member of the U.S. House of Representatives from Connecticut's 1st congressional district 1999–present	Incumbent
Preceded by Steny Hoyer	Ranking Member of the House Administration Committee; 2003–2005	Succeeded by Juanita Millender-McDonald
Party political offices
Preceded by Jim Clyburn	Vice Chair of the House Democratic Caucus; 2006–2009	Succeeded by Xavier Becerra
Preceded by Rahm Emanuel	Chair of the House Democratic Caucus; 2009–2013	Succeeded by Xavier Becerra
U.S. order of precedence (ceremonial)
Preceded by Gregory Meeks	United States representatives by seniority 27th	Succeeded by Jan Schakowsky
Preceded by Gregory Meeks	Order of precedence of the United States	Succeeded by Jan Schakowsky
