= Connecticut's 10th House of Representatives district =

American legislative district

Connecticut's 10th State House of Representatives district
Representative
Henry Genga; D

Connecticut's 10th House of Representatives district elects one member of the Connecticut House of Representatives. Its current representative is Henry Genga, who won a 2006 special election to replace Melody Currey upon her election as Mayor of East Hartford in 2005. The district consists of parts of the city of East Hartford.

== List of representatives ==
List of Representatives from Connecticut's 10th House District
Representative	Party	Years	District home	Note
Leonard G. Frazier	Democratic	1967–1973	East Hartford	Seat created
George W. Hannon Jr.	Democratic	1973–1975	East Hartford	
Timothy Moynihan	Democratic	1975–1986	East Hartford	Did not seek reelection
Gary Berner	Republican	1987–1991	East Hartford	Did not seek reelection
Rosemary Moynihan	Democratic	1991–1993	East Hartford	Did not seek reelection
Melody Currey	Democratic	1993–2006	East Hartford	Elected Mayor of East Hartford
Henry Genga	Democratic	2006–present	East Hartford	Won special election; incumbent
Angie Parkinson	Democratic	2027 member-elect		

== Recent elections ==
=== 2008 ===
State Election 2008: House District 10
Party	Candidate	Votes	%	±%
Democratic	Henry Genga	6,456	100.0	+26.0
Majority		6,456	100.0	+48.9
Turnout		6,456		
Democratic hold		Swing	+26.0	

State Election 2006: House District 10
Party	Candidate	Votes	%	±%
Democratic	Henry Genga	3,762	74.0	+27.7
Republican	John P. Ryan	1,243	24.4	−16.6
Working Families	Henry Genga	82	1.6	−10.9
Majority		2,601	51.1	+33.3
Turnout		5,087		
Democratic hold		Swing	+16.6	

Special Election, January 23, 2006: House District 10
Party	Candidate	Votes	%	±%
Democratic	Henry Genga	804	46.3	−28.2
Republican	Stephanie L. Labanowski	712	41.0	+17.3
Working Families	Henry Genga	217	12.5	+10.7
Independent	Phillip Gosselin	5	0.3	+0.3
Majority		309	17.8	−32.9
Turnout		1,738		
Democratic hold		Swing	-17.5	

State Election 2004: House District 10
Party	Candidate	Votes	%	±%
Democratic	Melody Currey	5,462	74.5	+3.9
Republican	Dominic Fulco	1,742	23.7	−3.8
Working Families	Linn T. Miller	132	1.8	−0.1
Majority		3,720	50.7	+7.6
Turnout		7,336		
Democratic hold		Swing	+3.9	

State Election 2002: House District 10
Party	Candidate	Votes	%	±%
Democratic	Melody Currey	3,722	70.6	−4.1
Republican	Donald H. Pitkin	1,451	27.5	+2.2
Working Families	Linn T. Miller	100	1.9	+1.9
Majority		2,271	43.1	−6.3
Turnout		5,273		
Democratic hold		Swing	-3.2	

State Election 2000: House District 10
Party	Candidate	Votes	%	±%
Democratic	Melody Currey	5,304	74.7	−1.5
Republican	Dominic Fulco	1,796	25.3	+1.5
Majority		3,508	49.4	−3.0
Turnout		7,100		
Democratic hold		Swing	-1.5	

State Election 1998: House District 10
Party	Candidate	Votes	%	±%
Democratic	Melody Currey	4,142	76.2	
Republican	Thomas D. Roy	1,293	23.8	
Majority		2,849	52.4	
Turnout		5,435		
Democratic hold		Swing		
