= Jeffrey Currey =

American politician

Jeff Currey

Member of the Connecticut House of Representatives from the 11th district
- In office January 2015 – January 2025
- Preceded by: Tim Larson
- Succeeded by: Patrick Biggins

Personal details
- Party: Democratic
- Education: Wagner College (BA)

Jeff Currey is an American politician from East Hartford, Connecticut. A Democrat, he was a member of the Connecticut House of Representatives from 2015 to 2025, representing the state's 11th district in East Hartford, Manchester and South Windsor. Following redistricting and the election of 2022, the 11th district represents East Hartford and Manchester.

== Early life ==
Currey is a lifetime resident of East Hartford. He is the son of Melody Currey, a former mayor of East Hartford and state representative, and Donald Curry, the former Treasurer of East Hartford and current chairman of the Metropolitan District Commission of Connecticut.

He attended the East Hartford public schools and received his B.A. in theater from Wagner College in New York City.

== Political career ==
Currey was first elected to the East Hartford Board of Education in 2009 and was later elected Chair.

In 2014, when then-Rep. Tim Larson left his state house seat to run for state senate, Currey ran to succeed him. He was unopposed in the Democratic primary and won the general election 66% to 34%. He took office in January 2015 and was reelected unopposed in 2016 and 2018.

On July 25, 2024, Currey stated he would not seek re-election to a 6th term. He would later take on the role of Jason Rojas' chief of staff.

== Personal life ==
Currey is openly gay. In 2018 he was one of two openly LGBT members of the Connecticut General Assembly, alongside Sen. Beth Bye (D–West Hartford).
