= Michael A. Christ =

American politician (born 1961)

Member of the Connecticut House of Representatives from the 11th district
- In office 1995–2009
- Preceded by: Gary LeBeau
- Succeeded by: Tim Larson

Personal details
- Born: July 3, 1961 (age 65)
- Party: Democratic
- Education: Central Connecticut State University (B.A.); Western New England College School of Law (J.D.)

Military service
- Branch/service: Massachusetts Air National Guard

Michael A. Christ (born July 3, 1961) is an American lawyer and politician from Connecticut. From 1995 to 2009, Christ served in the Connecticut House of Representatives, representing the 11th district as a Democrat. He was the Deputy Majority Leader in his final two terms. Christ later served as Director of Legislative Affairs for Connecticut Governor Dannel Malloy. Following his service in government, he "served as Vice President of Government Affairs for United Health Group for the New England region."

He earned his Bachelor of Arts in English from Central Connecticut State University and his J.D. from Western New England College School of Law. He was in the Massachusetts Air National Guard from 1980 to 1984.
