= Gary LeBeau =

American politician (born 1947)

Member of the Connecticut State Senate from the 3rd district
- In office 1997–2015
- Preceded by: Kevin Rennie
- Succeeded by: Tim Larson
- Constituency: represents East Hartford, East Windsor, Ellington, and South Windsor

Personal details
- Born: 1947 (age 78–79) Easthampton, Massachusetts, U.S.
- Party: Democratic

Gary LeBeau (born June 1, 1947) was a member of the Connecticut State Senate from the third district, serving the towns of East Hartford, South Windsor, East Windsor, and Ellington. LeBeau was first elected to the State Senate in 1996. He retired after 18 years in office.

== Biography ==
Born and raised in Easthampton, Massachusetts, Senator LeBeau was educated in public schools and graduated from the University of Massachusetts Amherst with a bachelors degree in political Science, a master's degree in Education, a master’s degree Education Administration from the University of Connecticut, and Elementary Education Certification from Central Connecticut State University. A former public school teacher for 36 years, Senator LeBeau is now retired. He lives in Glastonbury Ct.

== Legislative experience ==
LeBeau was first elected to the Connecticut General Assembly in 1990 as a state representative from the town of East Hartford. While in the state House, he served on the Finance Committee and as vice-chairman of the Commerce Committee. He was first elected to the state Senate in 1996, where he represents the 3rd Senatorial District towns of East Hartford, South Windsor, East Windsor and Ellington. In his time in the Senate, LeBeau has advocated for a state commitment to the Groton-area submarine base which helped save it from the federal budget axe; tax credits for job creation; major investments in biotechnology, stem cell research and alternative energies such as fuel cells; linking the research departments of various state institutions of higher learning with start-up, high-technology firms; contracting reform; Goodwin College; and the Rentschler Field complex. Senator LeBeau has also championed a transportation study of the Buckland shopping mall area and a legislative Task Force on Fatherhood.

In 2011, Senator LeBeau voted for HB 6599, a measure which would add gender identity and gender expression to existing anti-discrimination statutes. He also voted for HB 6650, which is intended to clarify and limit the classes of prisoners made eligible for early release by an earlier bill. Some Republicans in the Senate said that the bill didn't limit the early release program enough, allowing some violent felons to gain early release.

== Other public service ==
Senator LeBeau has been a member of the East Hartford Lions Club for 25 years and has held all major offices in the club. He served on the East Hartford Town Council and is currently a member of the Blessed Sacrament/Our Lady of Peace linked parishes, the East Hartford Historical Society, and the League of Women Voters. LeBeau has supported children's dental health by initiating the distribution of over 500 oral healthcare kits to children in East Hartford. His professional experience includes founding the Synergy School for at-risk students and working as the coordinator for Drop Out Prevention and Drug-Free Schools Program for the East Hartford schools and serving on the ERASE Board of Directors, The Capital Region Growth Council Board of Directors, the Liquor Control Task Force Against Underage Drinking, the CT Economic Conference Board, the International Trade Council, the Cultural Heritage Committee, and the East Hartford Child Plan.

== 2010 Connecticut gubernatorial election ==
On July 28, 2009, LeBeau announced the formation of an exploratory committee for the 2010 Connecticut gubernatorial election. LeBeau told the media in attendance that his first order of business would be to garner the support of Connecticut Democrats and he would start by visiting Democratic Town Committees around the state to hear their concerns about the future of Connecticut. LeBeau said he would make a decision whether or not to officially enter the statewide race by early 2010.

Connecticut House of Representatives
Preceded by Richard Torpey	Connecticut state representative for the Eleventh District; 1991–1995	Succeeded by Michael Christ
Connecticut State Senate
Preceded by Kevin Rennie	Connecticut Senator from the Third District; 1997–2015	Succeeded by Tim Larson
