= Nancy Kerensky =

American politician (born 1943)

Member of the Connecticut House of Representatives from the 14th district
- In office January 4, 1995 – January 5, 2005
- Preceded by: Kevin Rennie
- Succeeded by: Bill Aman

Personal details
- Born: September 14, 1943 (age 82) Denver, Colorado, U.S.
- Party: Democratic

Nancy Kerensky (born September 14, 1943) is an American politician who served in the Connecticut House of Representatives from the 14th district from 1995 to 2005.
