= Saud Anwar =

American physician and politician

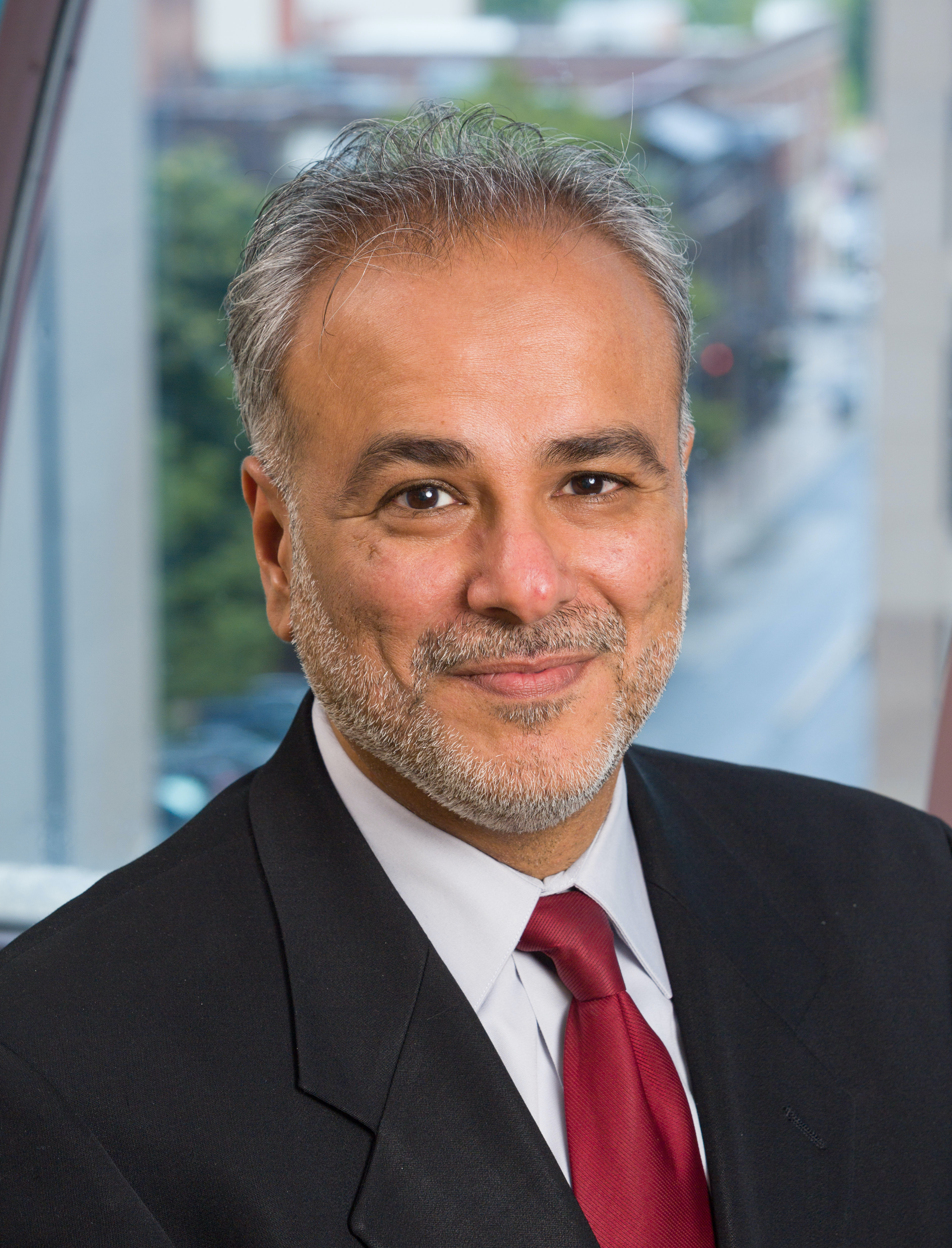

Member of the Connecticut State Senate from the 3rd district
- Incumbent
- Assumed office January 9, 2019
- Preceded by: Tim Larson

Personal details
- Born: 5 October 1967 (age 59) Pakistan
- Party: Democratic
- Education: Aga Khan University (MD); Yale University (MPH)
- Website: saudanwar.com

M. Saud Anwar (born October 5, 1967) is an American physician and politician who serves as a member of the Connecticut State Senate, representing the 3rd District. The district includes the towns of East Hartford, South Windsor, East Windsor, and Ellington. A member of the Democratic Party, Anwar was previously the mayor of South Windsor, Connecticut from 2013 to 2015, as well as 2017 to 2019. A pulmonary physician by profession, he is a graduate of Yale University and Aga Khan University. He has two children.

He currently serves as deputy president pro tempore of the Senate and co-chairs the Public Health Committee along with Representative Cristin McCarthy Vahey. Additionally he is a vice chair of the Insurance and Real Estate Committee and a member of the Appropriations, Housing, and Human Services committees.

== Electoral history ==
2024 Connecticut State Senate elections
Party	Candidate	Votes	%
Democratic	Saud Anwar	27,359	63.7%
Republican	Matt Siracusa	15,570	36.3%
Total votes		8,054	100

2022 Connecticut State Senate elections
Party	Candidate	Votes	%
Democratic	Saud Anwar	18,399	59.1%
Working Families	Saud Anwar	569	1.8%
Republican	Matt Harper	12,189	39.1%
Total votes		31,157	100

2020 Connecticut State Senate elections
Party	Candidate	Votes	%
Democratic	Saud Anwar (incumbent)	35,263	100
Total votes		35,263	100

2019 Connecticut's 3rd State Senate district special election
Party	Candidate	Votes	%
Democratic	Saud Anwar	4,737	58.8
Republican	Sarah Muska	3,317	41.2
Total votes		8,054	100

2016 Connecticut House of Representatives elections
Party	Candidate	Votes	%
Republican	Tom Delnicki	6,852	52.62
Democratic	Saud Anwar	6,170	47.38
Total votes		13,022	100
