= Henry Genga =

American politician from Connecticut

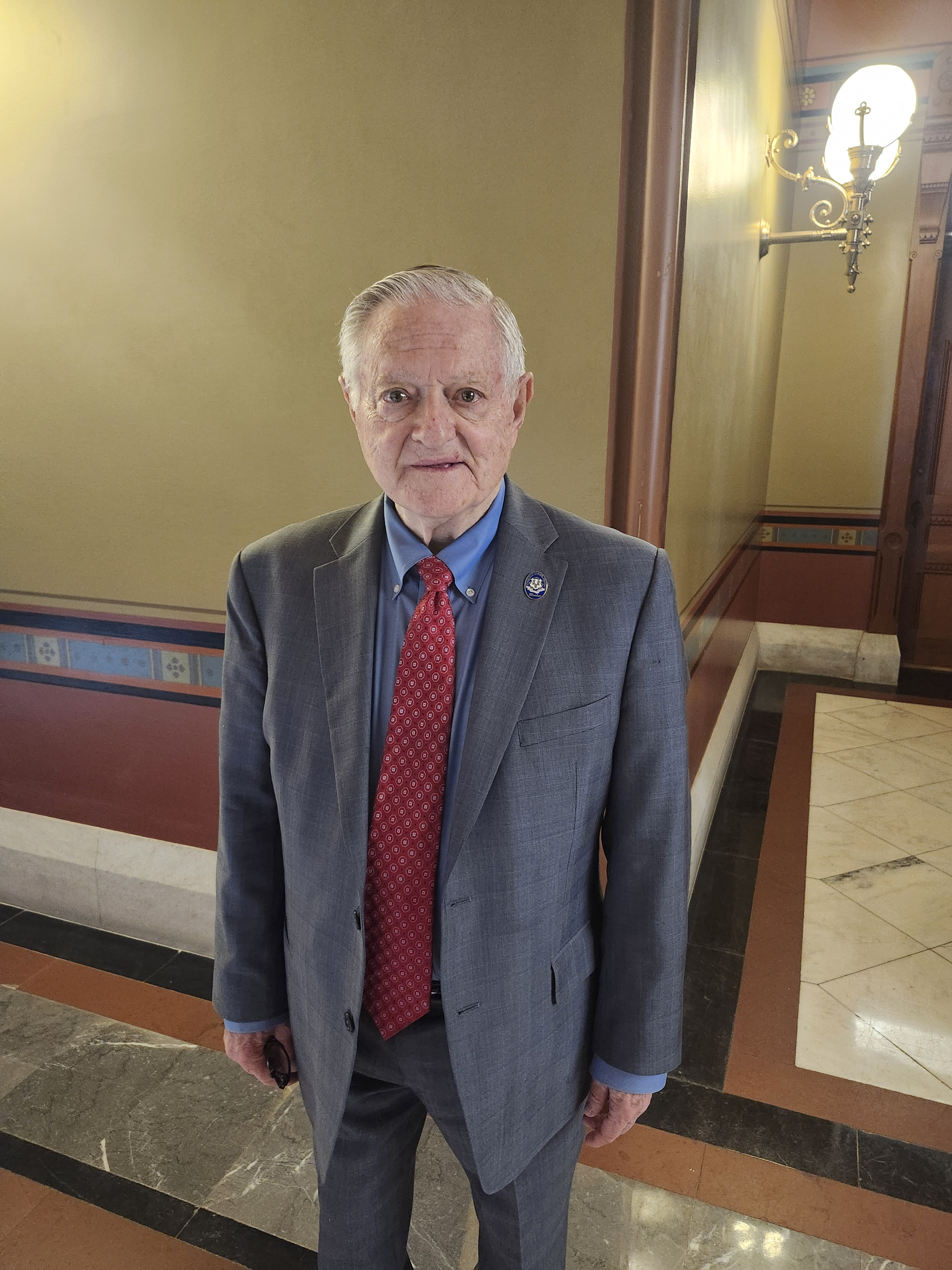

Member of the Connecticut House of Representatives from the 10th district
- Incumbent
- Assumed office February 1, 2006
- Preceded by: Melody Currey
- Succeeded by: Angie Parkinson (elect)

Personal details
- Born: December 8, 1939 (age 86) East Hartford, Connecticut, U.S.
- Party: Democratic
- Education: University of Hartford (BS); University of New Haven (M.Ed.)

Henry J. Genga (born December 8, 1939) is an American politician who has served in the Connecticut House of Representatives since 2006 from the 10th district, which represents part of East Hartford. A member of the Democratic Party, he announced in February 2026 that he would not seek re-election and is scheduled to leave office in January 2027.

== Early life and education ==
Genga attended East Hartford High School and earned a Bachelor of Science degree in business administration from the University of Hartford. He later received a master's degree in education from the University of New Haven and obtained Connecticut state certification in business education.

Before entering the state legislature, Genga worked as a senior information systems analyst at Travelers Insurance from 1974 to 1994. He later worked at East Hartford High School as a business and cooperative work experience instructor and summer youth employment coordinator from 1996 to 2007.

== Political career ==
Genga served on the East Hartford Town Council from 1975 to 1985, including as majority leader from 1976 to 1985. He later served as the town's treasurer from 1985 to 1997. He returned to the Town Council in 2003 and served until 2006, when he entered the Connecticut House of Representatives.

=== Connecticut House of Representatives ===
Genga won a special election on January 23, 2006, to represent Connecticut's 10th House District after incumbent Melody Currey became mayor of East Hartford. He received 1,021 combined votes on the Democratic and Working Families Party lines, defeating Republican Stephanie L. Labanowski, who received 712 votes. Independent candidate Philip Gosselin received five votes.

Genga won a full term later that year, defeating Republican John P. Ryan. A major focus of Genga's legislative work has been securing state funding for East Hartford. In 2011, he helped secure state funding for the expansion and renovation of the Raymond Public Library. The project received a $4 million state funding package, including $3 million in additional state funding, alongside local bonding and a grant from the Connecticut State Library. The expansion added public meeting space and an expanded children's section. In a 2024 interview, Genga said he had helped secure $35.8 million for East Hartford over his 18 years in the legislature, in addition to funding for the library.

Genga has also advocated for increased state aid to municipalities, arguing that additional funding can help limit pressure on local property taxes. In his 2019 legislative update, he highlighted a state budget that increased East Hartford's state grants by approximately $2.5 million, or 5 percent, bringing the town's annual allocation to more than $54 million. The funding included municipal aid and education funding.

Among the statewide legislation Genga supported was a 2019 measure to extend the time limits for prosecuting certain sexual assault crimes. He identified himself as a co-sponsor of legislation removing the statute of limitations for sexual assault crimes against minors. The measure formed part of a broader legislative effort to expand the period in which certain sexual assault offenses could be prosecuted.

Genga's other legislative priorities have included education, workforce development, public health and veterans' benefits. In 2007, he introduced and testified in support of a proposal to prohibit smoking in motor vehicles carrying young children, following a request from a local elementary school student. He also supported legislation concerning the review of school employees' personnel records during hiring. In 2019, he highlighted measures supporting advanced manufacturing training for high school students and increasing property tax exemptions for certain disabled veterans.

In his final legislative session in 2026, Genga highlighted the state budget's increased education funding and additional municipal aid for East Hartford, alongside legislation addressing online safety and consumer data privacy.

In February 2026, Genga announced that he would not seek re-election at the 2026 election. His term is scheduled to end in January 2027, concluding 20 years in the Connecticut House of Representatives.
