= Revolutionary War Campsite =

Archaeological site in Connecticut, United States

- U.S. National Register of Historic Places
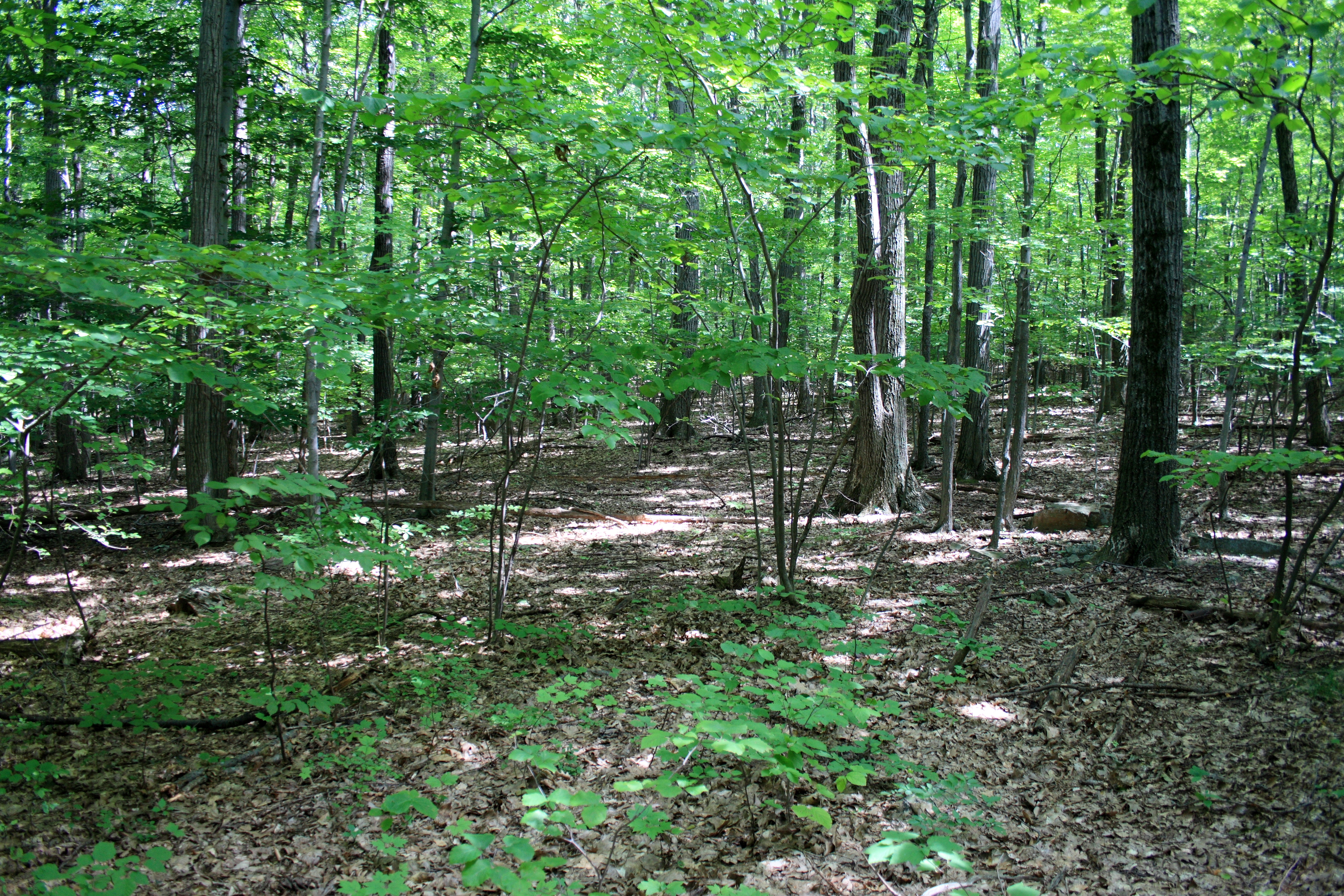

- Location within Connecticut Location within the United States
- Location: Grounds of MDC Reservoir #6, West Hartford, Connecticut
- Coordinates: 41°47′40″N 72°46′46″W
- Area: 8.7 acres (3.5 ha)
- Built: 1778
- NRHP reference No.: 86000853
- Added to NRHP: April 24, 1986

The Revolutionary War Campsite is a historic archaeological site in West Hartford, Connecticut. It was the site of a 1778 encampment of Continental Army soldiers during the American Revolutionary War. The site was listed on the National Register of Historic Places in 1986.

== Description ==
The site is located in a wooded area on the grounds of the Metropolitan District Commission, near the southern end of Reservoir #6, part of the Greater Hartford area public water supply. It is wooded, and the only significant surface remains at the site are ruins of stone-lined fireplaces. The site was long thought, without supporting evidence, to have been the location of an encampment by the French Army under Jean-Baptiste Donatien de Vimeur, comte de Rochambeau, during its march across Connecticut in 1780 and 1781; but detailed documentation of the movements of Rochambeau's movements shows that French forces never encamped in what is now West Hartford.

However, three brigades of the Continental Army were stationed in and near Hartford area in 1778, including Capt. Isaac Frye's Co. in the 3rd N.H. Battalion, commanded by Col. Alexander Scammell (Roll dated Nov. 3, 1778). As a result of General George Washington's worry that British Army forces shipping out of New York City were preparing to raid Connecticut communities. Two brigades, one commanded by Enoch Poor and the other by Ebenezer Learned, were ordered to the area in October 1778. Newspaper reports of the period and a contemporaneous journal kept by an officer of the 1st New Hampshire Regiment indicate that American soldiers camped at this location from October 15–21, 1778. The area was thereafter used as a military hospital.

== See also ==
- National Register of Historic Places listings in Hartford County, Connecticut
