= Tom Delnicki =

American politician

Member of the Connecticut House of Representatives from the 14th district
- Incumbent
- Assumed office January 4, 2017
- Preceded by: Bill Aman

Personal details
- Born: Thomas A. Delnicki; September 7, 1956 (age 69) South Windsor, Connecticut, U.S.
- Party: Republican
- Spouse: Audrey J. Bryda (m. 1986)
- Education: South Windsor High School
- Alma mater: University of Connecticut

Thomas A. Delnicki (born September 7, 1956), commonly known as Tom Delnicki, is an American politician who has served in the Connecticut House of Representatives from the 14th district since 2017. Delnicki is a Republican.

== Early life and education ==
Delnicki was born September 7, 1956, in South Windsor, Connecticut. He grew-up on the family farm which was owned in the fourth generation. He graduated from South Windsor High School in 1974 and earned a bachelor's degree from the University of Connecticut. He is of Lithuanian descent (original spelling was Delnickas) on his father's side.

== Career ==
He retired from the Metropolitan District as a Facilities/Maintenance Supervisor.

== Politics ==
Delnicki served on the South Windsor Town Council from 1995 to 2007 and again from 2009. During his tenure on the council, he has been Mayor twice, Deputy Mayor and served on the first Strategic Planning Committee formed in 1999. Since January 4, 2017, he serves as a member of the Connecticut House of Representatives for the Republican Party.

== Personal life ==
In 1986, Delnicki married Audrey J. Bryda (b. c. 1960), in South Windsor, Connecticut.
