= Melody Currey =

American politician (1950–2022)

Member of the Connecticut House of Representatives from the 10th district
- In office 1993–2006
- Preceded by: Rosemary Moynihan
- Succeeded by: Henry Genga

Personal details
- Born: December 17, 1950 Margaretville, New York, U.S.
- Died: June 13, 2022 (aged 71)
- Party: Democratic
- Relatives: Jeffrey Currey

Melody Alena Currey (December 17, 1950 – June 13, 2022) was an American politician.

Currey was born in Margaretville, New York. She went to State University of New York at Cobleskill. Currey lived in East Hartford, Connecticut, with her husband and family. Currey served in the Connecticut House of Representatives from 1993 to 2006 and was a Democrat. She then served as mayor of East Hartford from 2006 to 2010. Her son Jeffrey Currey also served in the Connecticut General Assembly.

She died on June 13, 2022, at the age of 71. She had retired from state service in 2019.
