= Connecticut's 3rd State Senate district =

American legislative district

Senator
| Saud Anwar; D |

Connecticut's 3rd State Senate district elects one member of the Connecticut State Senate. It consists of the towns of East Hartford, East Windsor, South Windsor, and part of Ellington. It is currently represented by Democrat Saud Anwar, who has served since 2019.

== Recent elections ==
=== 2020 ===
2020 Connecticut State Senate election, District 3
| Party | Candidate | Votes | % |
|---|---|---|---|
| Democratic | Saud Anwar (incumbent) | 31,543 | 89.45 |
| Working Families | Saud Anwar (incumbent) | 3,720 | 10.55 |
| Total votes | | 35,263 | 100.00 |
| Democratic hold | | | |

=== 2018 ===
2018 Connecticut State Senate election, District 3
| Party | Candidate | Votes | % |
|---|---|---|---|
| Democratic | Timothy Larson (incumbent) | 22,018 | 60.7 |
| Total | Jennifer L. Lovett | 14,260 | 39.3 |
| Republican | Jennifer L. Lovett | 13,464 | 37.1 |
| Independent | Jennifer L. Lovett | 796 | 2.2 |
| Total votes | | 36,278 | 100.0 |
| Democratic hold | | | |

=== 2016 ===
2016 Connecticut State Senate election, District 3
| Party | Candidate | Votes | % |
|---|---|---|---|
| Democratic | Timothy Larson (incumbent) | 23,913 | 56.18 |
| Republican | Carolyn Mirek | 18,650 | 43.82 |
| Total votes | | 42,563 | 100.0 |
| Democratic hold | | | |

=== 2014 ===
2014 Connecticut State Senate election, District 3
| Party | Candidate | Votes | % |
|---|---|---|---|
| Democratic | Timothy Larson (incumbent) | 17,536 | 60.70 |
| Republican | Sean Kelly | 11,337 | 39.30 |
| Total votes | | 28,873 | 100.0 |
| Democratic hold | | | |

=== 2012 ===
2012 Connecticut State Senate election, District 3
| Party | Candidate | Votes | % |
|---|---|---|---|
| Democratic | Gary LeBeau (incumbent) | 27,640 | 70.60 |
| Republican | Hector Reveron | 11,531 | 29.4 |
| Total votes | | 39,171 | 100.0 |
| Democratic hold | | | |
