= 1986 Connecticut Senate election =

1986 Connecticut State Senate election
- November 4, 1986

All 36 seats in the Connecticut State Senate 19 seats needed for a majority
	Majority party	Minority party
Leader	Cornelius O'Leary	Reginald Smith
Party	Democratic	Republican
Leader's seat	7th	8th
Last election	12	24
Seats won	25	11
Seat change	▲13	▼13
Popular vote	530,506	415,730
Percentage	56.07%	43.93%
Swing	▲11.83%	▼11.34%
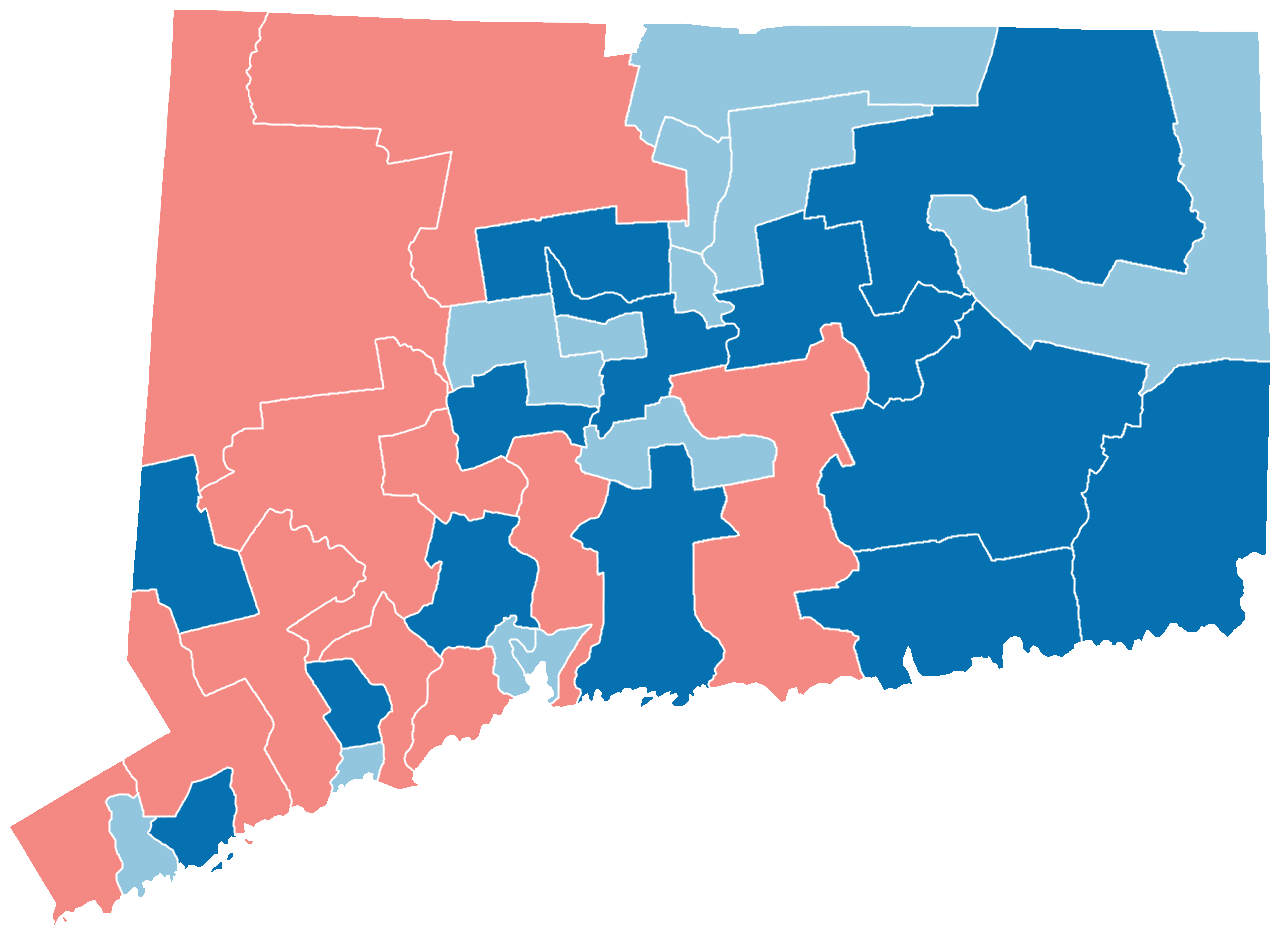
- Results: Democratic hold Democratic gain Republican hold
President pro tempore before election
Philip Robertson
Republican
Elected President pro tempore
John B. Larson
Democratic

The 1986 Connecticut State Senate elections took place as a part of the biennial 1986 United States elections. All 36 seats were up for re-election. Senators serve two-year terms and are up for re-election every election cycle.

The Democrats, led by minority leader Cornelius O'Leary, flipped control of the State Senate. They managed to gain a two-thirds majority over the Republicans, achieving a supermajority. This was in large part attributed to the popularity of incumbent Democratic governor William O'Neill and his landslide re-election, having a coattail effect boosting down-ballot Connecticut Democrats due to the state's improved economy, with it also leading to them reclaiming the state house.

== Retirements ==
Two incumbents did not seek re-election.

=== Republicans ===
1. District 5: Anne Streeter retired.
2. District 26: John Grennell Matthews retired.

== Special elections ==
One special election was called for the 25th district due to Republican Senator Andrew Santaniello's unexpected death on March 15, 1986. The date of the election was held on May 6, 1986. Republican councilman Joseph Santo managed to beat former Democratic state representative John Atkin, and held the seat Republican.

However, in the general election on November 4, Atkin managed to unseat Santo in a rematch, flipping the seat Democratic.

== Incumbents defeated ==
Twelve incumbents, all Republicans, were defeated in general elections.

=== In general election ===
==== Republicans ====
1. District 4: Carl A. Zinsser lost re-election to Michael Meotti.
2. District 9: Richard B. Johnston lost re-election to Cynthia Matthews.
3. District 12: Richard S. Eaton lost re-election to Thomas J. Sullivan.
4. District 16: Joseph C. Markley lost re-election to Donald M. Rinaldi.
5. District 17: John F. Consoli lost re-election to Gary A. Hale.
6. District 18: Donald Schoolcraft lost re-election to Steven Spellman.
7. District 19: Eric R. Benson lost re-election to Kenneth Przybysz.
8. District 20: Pierce F. Connair lost re-election to Mark H. Powers.
9. District 22: Lee Scarpetti lost re-election to Howard T. Owens Jr.
10. District 24: Robert T. Miller lost re-election to James H. Maloney.
11. District 25: Joseph Santo lost re-election to John Atkin.
12. District 35: James D. Giulietti lost re-election to Marie Herbst.

== Results ==
Popular vote
Democratic	56.07%
Republican	43.93%

Senate seats
Democratic	69.44%
Republican	30.56%

=== District 1 ===
Connecticut's 1st State Senate district election, 1986
Party	Candidate	Votes	%
Democratic	William A. DiBella (incumbent)	14,624	77.4%
Republican	Donald B. LaCroix	4,268	22.6%
Total votes		18,892	100.00%
Democratic hold			

=== District 2 ===
Connecticut's 2nd State Senate district election, 1986
Party	Candidate	Votes	%
Democratic	Frank D. Barrows (incumbent)	13,522	76.9%
Republican	Arnika-Maia Mott	4,063	23.1%
Total votes		17,585	100.0%
Democratic hold			

=== District 3 ===
Connecticut's 3rd State Senate district election, 1986
Party	Candidate	Votes	%
Democratic	John B. Larson (incumbent)	20,316	100.00%
Total votes		20,316	100.00%
Democratic hold			

=== District 4 ===
Connecticut's 4th State Senate district election, 1986
Party	Candidate	Votes	%
Democratic	Michael Meotti	17,776	51.1%
Republican	Carl A. Zinsser (incumbent)	16,998	48.9%
Total votes		34,774	100.0%
Democratic gain from Republican			

=== District 5 ===
Connecticut's 5th State Senate district election, 1986
Party	Candidate	Votes	%
Democratic	Kevin Sullivan	21,374	55.5%
Republican	Charles R. Matties	17,163	44.5%
Total votes		38,537	100.0%
Democratic gain from Republican			

=== District 6 ===
Connecticut's 6th State Senate district election, 1986
Party	Candidate	Votes	%
Democratic	Joseph H. Harper Jr. (incumbent)	15,625	69.7%
Republican	Bernard B. Walsh Jr.	6,804	30.3%
Total votes		22,429	100.0%
Democratic hold			

=== District 7 ===
Connecticut's 7th State Senate district election, 1986
Party	Candidate	Votes	%
Democratic	Cornelius P. O'Leary (incumbent)	18,880	100.0%
Total votes		18,880	100.0%
Democratic hold			

=== District 8 ===
Connecticut's 8th State Senate district election, 1986
Party	Candidate	Votes	%
Republican	Reginald J. Smith (incumbent)	18,757	55.8%
Democratic	Dwight Schweitzer	14,874	44.2%
Total votes		33,631	100.0%
Republican hold			
