= 2002 Connecticut Senate election =

2002 Connecticut State Senate election
- November 5, 2002

All 36 seats in the Connecticut State Senate 19 seats needed for a majority
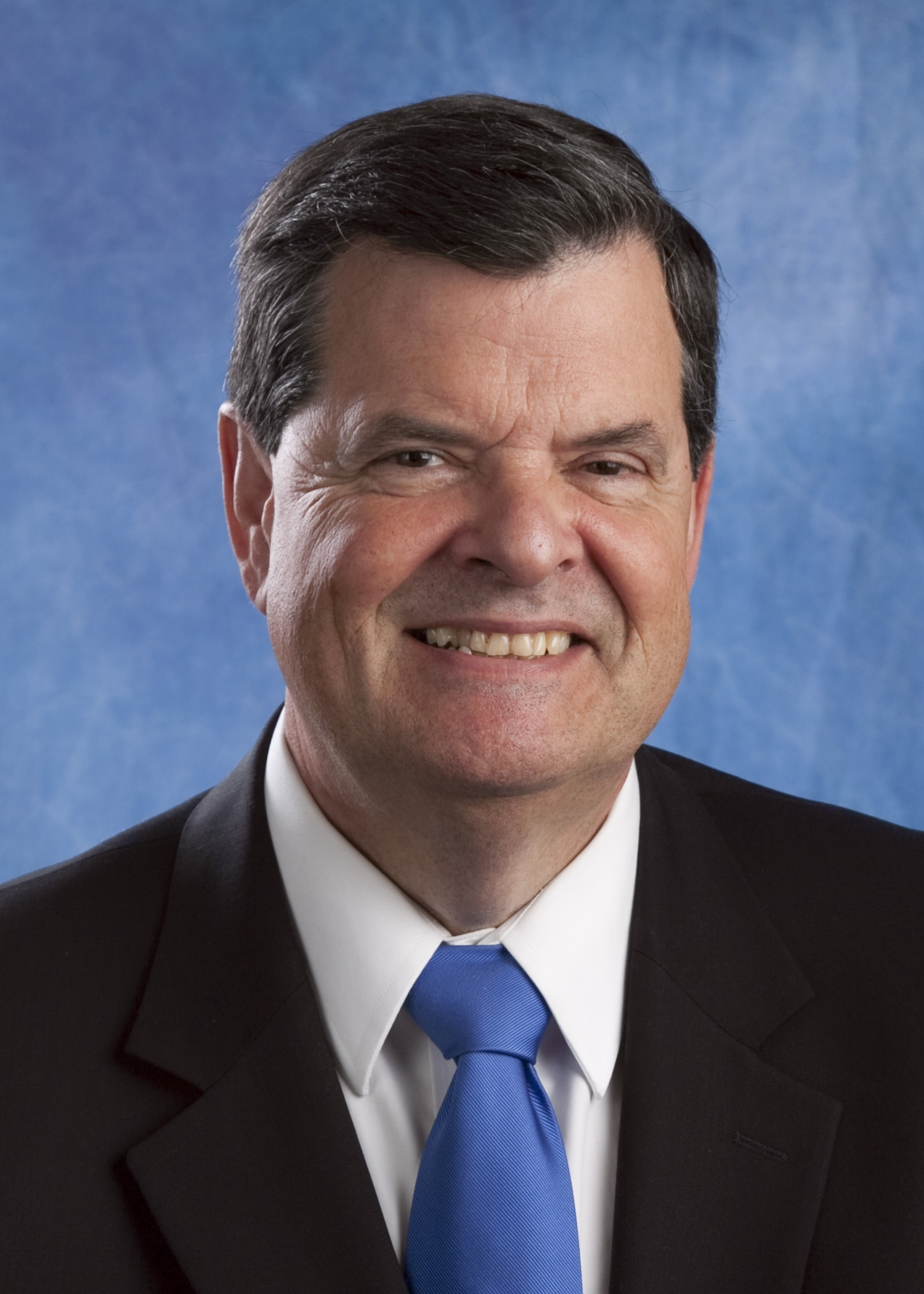

	Majority party	Minority party
Leader	Kevin Sullivan	Louis DeLuca
Party	Democratic	Republican
Leader since	January 8, 1997	2001
Leader's seat	5th	32nd
Last election	21	15
Seats after	21	15
Seat change	Steady	Steady
- Results: Democratic hold Democratic gain Republican hold Republican gain
President pro tempore of the Senate before election
Kevin Sullivan
Democratic
Elected President pro tempore of the Senate
Kevin Sullivan
Democratic

The 2002 Connecticut State Senate elections took place as a part of the biennial 2002 United States elections. All 36 seats were up for re-election. Senators serve two year terms and are up for re-election every election cycle. The primary elections which took place on September 10, 2002, determined which candidates appeared on the ballot for the November 5th general election.

== Predictions ==
Source	Ranking	As of
The Cook; Political Report	Likely D	October 4, 2002

== Results ==
=== District 1 ===
District 1
Party	Candidate	Votes	%
Democratic	John Fonfara (incumbent)	10,618	
Republican	John M. Halstead	3,488	
Green	S. Michael DeRosa	876	
Total votes		14,982	100.0%
Democratic hold			

=== District 2 ===
District 2
Party	Candidate	Votes	%
Democratic	Eric D. Coleman (incumbent)	14,810	77.07
Republican	Joseph Q. Fleeting	4,407	22.93
Total votes		19,217	100.00
Democratic hold			

=== District 3 ===
District 3
Party	Candidate	Votes	%
Democratic	Gary LeBeau (incumbent)	16,334	
Republican	Stephanie L. Labanowski	11,454	
Total votes		27,788	100.0%
Democratic hold			

=== District 4 ===
District 4
Party	Candidate	Votes	%
Democratic	Mary Ann Handley (incumbent)	22,461	63.73
Republican	David O. Odegard	12,781	36.27
Total votes		35,242	100.00
Democratic hold			

=== District 5 ===
District 5
Party	Candidate	Votes	%
Democratic	Kevin B. Sullivan (incumbent)	25,762	69.26
Republican	Douglas T. Putnam	11,053	29.72
Working Families	Abraham J. Walker	381	1.02
Total votes		37,196	100.00
Democratic hold			

=== District 6 ===
District 6
Party	Candidate	Votes	%
Democratic	Donald J. DeFronzo	12,353	54.12
Republican	Thomas Bozek	10,474	45.88
Total votes		22,827	100.00
Democratic hold			

=== District 7 ===
District 7
Party	Candidate	Votes	%
Republican	John A. Kissel (incumbent)	18,169	62.56
Democratic	John A. Reveruzzi	10,873	37.44
Total votes		29,042	100.00
Republican hold			

=== District 8 ===
District 8
Party	Candidate	Votes	%
Republican	Thomas J. Herlihy (incumbent)	22,327	64.65
Democratic	Kelvin Hecht	10,826	31.35
Green	Thomas J. Sevigny	1,382	4.00
Total votes		34,535	100.00
Republican hold			

=== District 9 ===
District 9
Party	Candidate	Votes	%
Democratic	Biagio "Billy" Ciotto (incumbent)	21,932	69.68
Republican	Ken McClellan	9,543	30.32
Total votes		31,475	100.00
Democratic hold			

=== District 10 ===
District 10
Party	Candidate	Votes	%
Democratic	Toni N. Harp (incumbent)	12,286	100.00
Total votes		12,286	100.00
Democratic hold			

=== District 11 ===
District 11
Party	Candidate	Votes	%
Democratic	Martin Looney (incumbent)	15,022	
Republican	Ernest J. Diette, Jr.	4,735	
Total votes		19,757	100.0%
Democratic hold			

=== District 12 ===
District 12
Party	Candidate	Votes	%
Republican	William Aniskovich (incumbent)	20,576	
Democratic	Catherine S. Jackson	13,501	
Total votes		34,077	100.0%
Republican hold			

=== District 13 ===
District 13
Party	Candidate	Votes	%
Democratic	Thomas Gaffey (incumbent)	17,557	
Republican	Joseph E. Bibisi	11,236	
Working Families	Linda L. Moore	597	
Total votes		29,390	100.0%
Democratic hold			

=== District 14 ===
District 14
Party	Candidate	Votes	%
Republican	Win Smith, Jr. (incumbent)	17,034	
Democratic	Andrew C. Testo	11,267	
Total votes		28,301	100.0%
Republican hold			

=== District 15 ===
District 15
Party	Candidate	Votes	%
Democratic	Joan Hartley (incumbent)	12,475	
Working Families	Blair F. Bertaccini	1,273	
Total votes		13,748	100.0%
Democratic hold			

=== District 16 ===
District 16
Party	Candidate	Votes	%
Democratic	Chris Murphy	15,953	
Republican	Ann P. Dandrow	14,370	
Total votes		30,323	100.0%
Democratic gain from Republican			

=== District 17 ===
District 17
Party	Candidate	Votes	%
Democratic	Joe Crisco (incumbent)	17,142	100.0%
Total votes		17,142	100.0%
Democratic hold			

=== District 18 ===
District 18
Party	Candidate	Votes	%
Republican	Cathy Welles Cook (incumbent)	15,653	
Democratic	Michael J. Kindle	9,855	
Green	Penny L. Teal	1,487	
Total votes		26,995	100.0%
Republican hold			

=== District 19 ===
District 19
Party	Candidate	Votes	%
Democratic	Edith Prague (incumbent)	15,448	
Republican	Peter A. Nystrom	13,132	
Total votes		28,580	100.0%
Democratic hold			

=== District 20 ===
District 20
Party	Candidate	Votes	%
Democratic	Melodie Peters (incumbent)	17,705	
Republican	John Leahy	11,021	
Total votes		28,726	100.0%
Democratic hold			

=== District 21 ===
District 21
Party	Candidate	Votes	%
Republican	George Gunther (incumbent)	20,115	
Democratic	Jack Terceno	12,216	
Total votes		32,371	100.0%
Republican hold			

=== District 22 ===
District 22
Party	Candidate	Votes	%
Democratic	Bill Finch (incumbent)	13,354	
Republican	Elaine S. Hammers	10,782	
Total votes		24,136	100.0%
Democratic hold			

=== District 23 ===
District 23
Party	Candidate	Votes	%
Democratic	Alvin Penn (incumbent)	7,256	
Republican	Jerry A. Blackwell	2,146	
Working Families	Heather Partlow	252	
Total votes		9,654	100.0%
Republican hold			

=== District 24 ===
District 24
Party	Candidate	Votes	%
Republican	David Cappiello	15,488	100.0%
Total votes		15,488	100.0%
Republican hold			

=== District 25 ===
District 25
Party	Candidate	Votes	%
Republican	Robert Genuario (incumbent)	14,007	
Democratic	William Wrenn	9,277	
Working Families	A. Brian Petronella	340	
Total votes		23,624	100.0%
Republican hold			

=== District 26 ===
District 26
Party	Candidate	Votes	%
Republican	Judith G. Freedman (incumbent)	23,687	100.0%
Total votes		23,687	100.0%
Republican hold			

=== District 27 ===
District 27
Party	Candidate	Votes	%
Democratic	Andrew J. McDonald	11,482	
Republican	Michael Fedele	10,180	
Total votes		21,662	100.0%
Democratic hold			

=== District 28 ===
District 28
Party	Candidate	Votes	%
Republican	John P. McKinney (incumbent)	22,728	100.0%
Total votes		22,728	100.0%
Republican hold			

=== District 29 ===
District 29
Party	Candidate	Votes	%
Democratic	Donald E. Williams Jr. (incumbent)	14,288	
Republican	Deborah B. Noble	1,564	
Total votes		15,852	100.0%
Democratic hold			

=== District 30 ===
District 30
Party	Candidate	Votes	%
Republican	Andrew Roraback (incumbent)	23,606	
Democratic	Robert L. Marconi	9,478	
Total votes		33,084	100.0%
Republican hold			

=== District 31 ===
District 31
Party	Candidate	Votes	%
Democratic	Tom Colapietro (incumbent)	16,024	
Republican	Andrew J. Kasznay Jr.	8,495	
Total votes		24,519	100.0%
Democratic hold			

=== District 32 ===
District 32
Party	Candidate	Votes	%
Republican	Louis DeLuca (incumbent)	22,139	
Democratic	Patricia L. Reilly	12,237	
Total votes		34,376	100.0%
Republican hold			

=== District 33 ===
District 33
Party	Candidate	Votes	%
Democratic	Eileen Daily (incumbent)	20,623	
Republican	Anthony Chirico	12,675	
Total votes		33,298	100.0%
Democratic hold			

=== District 34 ===
District 34
Party	Candidate	Votes	%
Republican	Len Fasano	15,213	
Democratic	Brian McDermott (incumbent)	14,703	
Working Families	Marie J. Guest	416	
Total votes		30,332	100.0%
Republican gain from Democratic			

=== District 35 ===
District 35
Party	Candidate	Votes	%
Republican	Tony Guglielmo (incumbent)	21,774	
Democratic	Patrick J. Flaherty	11,949	
Total votes		33,723	100.0%
Republican hold			

=== District 36 ===
District 36
Party	Candidate	Votes	%
Republican	William H. Nickerson	20,445	100.0%
Total votes		20,445	100.0%
Republican hold			
