= 2026 Connecticut state legislative special elections =

- 2026
Party	Democratic	Republican
Seats up	2	0
Seats won	2

Two special elections to the Connecticut Legislature were held in 2026: one to the Connecticut House of Representatives in District 25 which was held on January 6, 2026, and one to the Connecticut House of Representatives in District 139 which was held on January 13, 2026.

== District 25 ==
2026 Connecticut House of Representatives District 25 special election
- January 6, 2026
Nominee	Iris Sanchez	Jamie Vaughan
Party	Democratic	Republican
Popular vote	356	181
Percentage	66.29%	33.71%
House Member before election
Bobby Sanchez
Democratic
Elected House Member
Iris Sanchez
Democratic

A special election was made necessary in House District 25 after Bobby Sanchez resigned on November 12, 2025, to become the new mayor of New Britain. On November 21, 2025, Governor Ned Lamont called for a special election to be held on January 6, 2026, to fill the open seat.

House District 25 is located in the Northern middle section of Connecticut and encompasses parts of the city of New Britain. Bobby Sanchez was reelected in 2024 with 70.1% of the vote over Republican Jaime Vaughn.

=== Democratic Nominee ===
Iris Sanchez, a New Britain city councilwoman, was nominated by her party.

=== Republican Nominee ===
Jaime Vaughn, the Republican nominee in 2024, was nominated by her party.

=== Results ===
2025 Connecticut House of Representatives District 25 special election
Party	Candidate	Votes	%	±%
Democratic	Iris Sanchez	356	66.29%	−3.79%
Republican	Jaime Vaughn	181	33.71%	+3.79%
Total votes		537	100.00%	
Turnout		8,920	6.02%	

== District 139 ==
2026 Connecticut House of Representatives District 139 special election
- January 13, 2026
Nominee	Larry Pemberton	Brandon Sabbag
Party	Democratic	Republican
Popular vote	1,827	806
Percentage	64.49%	28.45%
House Member before election
Kevin Ryan
Democratic
Elected House Member
Larry Pemberton
Democratic

A special election was made necessary in House District 139 after Kevin Ryan passed away on November 23, 2025. On November 28, 2025, Governor Ned Lamont called for a special election to be held on January 13, 2026, to fill the open seat.

House District 139 is located in the Western southern section of Connecticut and encompasses parts of the towns of Ledyard, Montville, and of the city of Norwich. Kevin Ryan was reelected in 2024 with 54.7% of the vote over Republican Jaime Vaughn.

=== Democratic Nominee ===
Larry Pemberton, a member of and the treasurer for the Eastern Pequot Tribal Nation, was nominated by his party.

=== Republican Nominee ===
Brandon Sabbag, a local businessman, was nominated by his party.

=== Write-In Candidates ===
Mark Adams, the Republican nominee in 2024.

=== Results ===
2025 Connecticut House of Representatives District 139 special election
Party	Candidate	Votes	%	±%
Democratic	Larry Pemberton	1,754	61.91%	+11.17%
Working Families	Larry Pemberton	73	2.58%	−0.01%
Total	Larry Pemberton	1,827	64.49%	+9.82%
Republican	Brandon Sabbag	806	28.45%	−16.88%
Independent	Mark Adams (write-in)	200	7.06%	+7.06%
Total votes		2,824	100.00%	
Turnout		15,102	18.70%	

Town	Larry Pemberton Democratic		Brandon Sabbag Republican		Mark Adams Independent		Margin		Total votes cast
Town	#	%	#	%	#	%	#	%	Total votes cast
Ledyard (part)	434	67.18%	197	30.50%	15	2.32%	237	36.68%	646
Montville (part)	505	63.13%	254	31.75%	41	5.13%	251	31.38%	800
Norwich (part)	888	64.02%	355	25.59%	144	10.38%	533	38.43%	1,387
Totals	1,827	64.49%	806	28.45%	200	7.06%	1,021	36.04%	2,824
