= John Fabrizio =

American politician (1923–2006)

John A. Fabrizio

Member of the Connecticut House of Representatives from the 147th district
- In office 1969–1973
- Preceded by: Thomas E. Tierney
- Succeeded by: James F. Bingham

Personal details
- Born: November 17, 1923
- Died: April 7, 2006 (aged 82)

John A. Fabrizio (November 17, 1923 – April 7, 2006) was an American politician.

A Republican from Norwalk, Fabrizio won two terms on the Connecticut House of Representatives in the 147th district, defeating Patrick McBennett in 1968 and Simon B. Ehrlich in 1970. Prior to the 1972 election cycle, redistricting formed the 140th district from the old 148th district, 147th district and part of the 145th district. This forced a contest between two incumbents, Fabrizio and Otha Brown, Jr. Fabrizio defeated Brown by in the November 1972 election. In 1974, Fabrizio contested the Connecticut State Senate's 25th district, losing to Louis Ciccarello.

Connecticut House of Representatives
Preceded by Thomas E. Tierney	Member of the Connecticut House of Representatives from the 147th district 1969–1973	Succeeded by James F. Bingham
Preceded by Roy Henry Ervin	Member of the Connecticut House of Representatives from the 140th district 1973–1975	Succeeded by William A. Collins
