= Paul Munns =

American politician

Member of the Connecticut State Senate from the 4th district
- In office January 4, 1995 – January 8, 1997
- Preceded by: Michael Meotti
- Succeeded by: Mary Ann Handley

Member of the Connecticut House of Representatives from the 9th district
- In office January 4, 1989 – January 4, 1995
- Preceded by: Donald F. Bates
- Succeeded by: Richard D. Veltri

Personal details
- Born: September 6, 1963 (age 63)
- Party: Republican

Paul Munns (born September 6, 1963) is an American politician who served in the Connecticut House of Representatives from the 9th district from 1989 to 1995 and in the Connecticut State Senate from the 4th district from 1995 to 1997.
