= Jonathan Harris (politician) =

American politician

Jonathan A. Harris
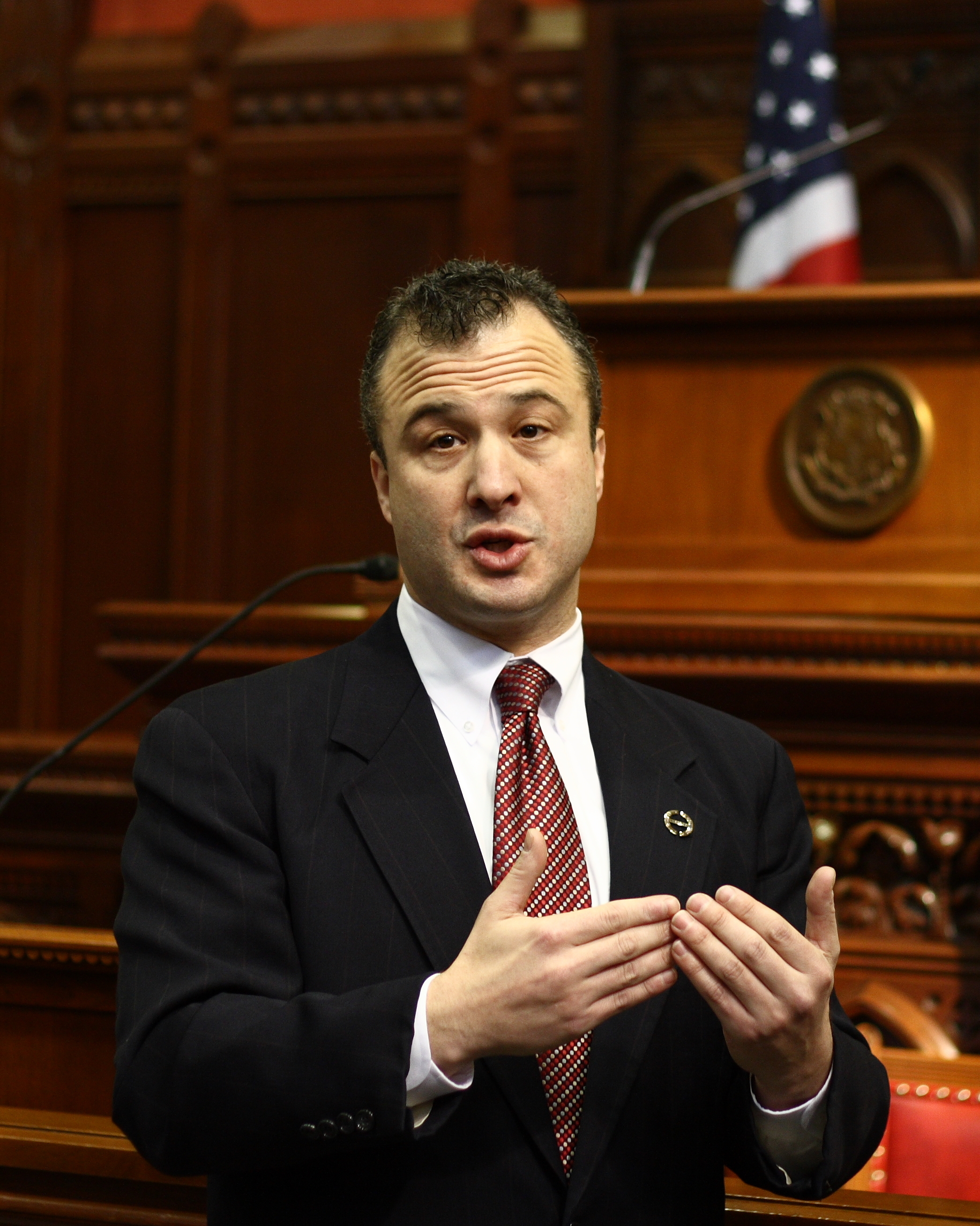

Member of the Connecticut State Senate from the 5th district
- In office January 2005 – January 2011
- Preceded by: Kevin Sullivan
- Succeeded by: Beth Bye
- Constituency: Represented Bloomfield (part), Burlington, Farmington (part), and West Hartford

Mayor of West Hartford
- In office 2001–2004
- Deputy: Scott Slifka
- Succeeded by: Scott Slifka

Personal details
- Born: April 12, 1964 (age 62)
- Party: Democratic
- Spouse: Lucy Bourgoin Harris
- Children: 1
- Education: Brandeis University; NYU School of Law
- Profession: Attorney

Jonathan A. Harris (born 1964) is an American politician. Harris, a Democrat, is the former Commissioner of the Connecticut Department of Consumer Protection. He served as a state senator from Connecticut's Fifth District from 2005 to 2011.

== Early life ==
Harris grew up in West Hartford and graduated from Hall High School and later from Brandeis University. He worked for U.S. Congressman Barbara Kennelly before earning a Juris Doctor degree from New York University School of Law.

== Political career ==
Harris, a resident of West Hartford, represented Bloomfield (part), Burlington, Farmington (part), and West Hartford in the Connecticut Senate. Prior to being elected to the Senate, he served as mayor of West Hartford.

On April 1, 2010, Harris formally entered the race for Connecticut Secretary of the State. He was endorsed by U.S. Rep. John B. Larson (D-CT) and West Hartford mayor Scott Slifka. Harris narrowly missed receiving the Democratic Party's nomination at the state convention. He withdrew from the race on June 7, 2010.

In March 2011, Harris was appointed Deputy Treasurer of the State of Connecticut. He served until May 2012. On May 11, 2012, State Party Chair Nancy Dinardo announced that Harris would succeed Eric Hyers as the Executive Director of the Connecticut Democratic State Central Committee. In December 2014, Harris was nominated to succeed William M. Rubenstein as the Commissioner of the Department of Consumer Protection. He served as commissioner from 2015 to 2017.

On February 24, 2018, Harris officially announced his run for governor of Connecticut. Prior to that date, he had been exploring a run for statewide office. As of January 1, 2018, Harris had raised $232,745. Harris dropped out of the race on April 27, 2018, and endorsed Ned Lamont. Harris joined the Lamont administration as the undersecretary of comprehensive planning and intergovernmental policy at the Office of Policy and Management. In July 2019, he was promoted to senior adviser to Gov. Lamont.

In 2021, Harris joined Eversource Energy as Director of Regulatory Affairs.

== Electoral history ==
Connecticut Senate: General Election 2004: 5th District
Party	Candidate	Votes	%
Democratic	Jonathan A. Harris	28,502	58.0
Republican	Kevin Connors	20,629	42.0

Connecticut Senate: General Election 2006: 5th District
Party	Candidate	Votes	%
Democratic	Jonathan A. Harris	27,164	70.2
Republican	Kimberly E. Ryder	11,526	29.8

Connecticut Senate: General Election 2008: 5th District
Party	Candidate	Votes	%
Democratic	Jonathan A. Harris	36,040	70.9
Republican	Joseph Merritt	14,807	29.1

== Personal life ==
Harris is married to Lucy B. Harris.

Preceded by Kevin Sullivan	Connecticut Senator from the Fifth District; 2005–2011	Succeeded by Beth Bye
