= William J. Lyons Jr. =

American politician (1921–2014)

Member of the Connecticut State Senate from the 25th district
- In office 1973–1975
- Preceded by: Jacob Rudolf
- Succeeded by: Louis Ciccarello

Member of the Connecticut House of Representatives from the 149th district
- In office 1971–1973
- Preceded by: Bernard Breeman
- Succeeded by: Abijah Upson Fox

Personal details
- Born: May 30, 1921 Norwalk, Connecticut, U.S.
- Died: April 11, 2014 (aged 92) Norwalk, Connecticut, U.S.
- Resting place: St. John's Cemetery, Norwalk, Connecticut, U.S.
- Party: Republican
- Spouse: Patricia Russell Lyons
- Education: Notre Dame University

Military service
- Unit: Third Army
- Battles/wars: Battle of the Bulge

William J. Lyons Jr. (May 30, 1921 – April 11, 2014) was an American businessman and politician.

Born in Norwalk, Connecticut, Lyons attended Oratory Preparatory School and went to the University of Notre Dame. He then served in the United States Army in Europe during World War II. Lyons owned Lyons Construction Company in Norwalk. He served one term in the Connecticut State Senate from 1973 to 1975 as a Republican.

== Notes ==
Connecticut House of Representatives
Preceded by Bernard Breeman	Member of the Connecticut House of Representatives from the 149th district 1971–1973	Succeeded by Abijah Upson Fox
Connecticut State Senate
Preceded by Jacob Rudolf	Member of the Connecticut State Senate from the 25th district 1973–1975	Succeeded by Louis Ciccarello
