= Joseph Mann =

American politician (born 1955)

Joseph E. Mann

Member of the Connecticut House of Representatives from the 140th District
- In office 2003–2007
- Preceded by: Joseph Clemmons
- Succeeded by: Bruce Morris

Personal details
- Born: 1955 (age 70–71) North Carolina
- Party: Democratic
- Spouse: Shirley J. Mann
- Children: four children
- Education: Bethune-Cookman University; Hartford Seminary
- Website: jemann.com

Joseph E. Mann (born 1955) is a former two-term member of the Connecticut House of Representatives from Norwalk, Connecticut's 140th assembly district. He served in the Connecticut House from 2003 to 2007. He also served nine years on the Norwalk Common Council, including as its president. He currently serves on the board of Norwalk Economic Opportunity Now.

== Early life and family ==
Mann is the eldest of five children of Leslie and Harriet Mann. He was born in North Carolina, and moved to Norwalk in 1958 at the age of three. He attended Norwalk public schools, graduating from Brien McMahon High School in 1973. He attended Bethune-Cookman College, where he majored in business administration and was a member of the Omega Psi Phi fraternity. In 1996, he graduated from the Hartford Seminary.

== Political career ==
Mann was elected to the Connecticut House in a three way race against Republican Richard McQuaid and petition candidate Donnie Sellers, who was a Democrat who had once held the seat. He was elected to the Connecticut House in November 2002, and took office on January 8, 2003.

He served on the Human Services Committee, the Higher Education and Employment Advancement Committee and as Vice-Chair of the Select Committee on Housing.

== Other public offices ==
- Member, Norwalk Democratic Town & City Committee,
- Member, Second Taxing District Charter Revision Committee
- Member, Mid-Fairfield Substance Abuse Coalition
- Commissioner & Vice Chair of the Second Taxing District Electric Commission

== Associations ==
- President & CEO, Norwalk Economic Opportunity Now, Inc.
- Member, YMCA of Norwalk Board of Trustees
- Member, Norwalk Hospital Board of Trustees
- Chair, Norwalk Community Health Center Board of Trustees
- Member, Norwalk Maritime Aquarium Board of Trustees
- Justice of the Peace
- Member, New Light Missionary Baptist Church
- Treasurer, Norwalk Branch NAACP
- Keeper of Finance, Alpha Nu Chapter, Omega Psi Phi fraternity

== Awards and honors ==
- Distinguished Service and Superior Service Award from the Alpha Nu Chapter of Omega Psi Phi fraternity
- Omega Man of the Year for 2010
- Man of the Year Recognition from the G. W. Carver Youth Development Program
- Award for Outstanding Advocacy from the Mid-Fairfield Child Guidance Center
- Recognition for Outstanding Legislative Leadership from the Connecticut Community Providers Association
- Thurgood Marshal Community Service Award from Quinnipiac University's Black Law School Student's Association
- Community Service Award from the Parent Leadership Training Institute (PLTI)
- Reverend J. P. Ball Award for Leadership from the Norwalk Branch of the NAACP
- Named one of the 100 Most Influential Blacks in the State of Connecticut by the Connecticut State Conference of NAACP Branches in 2009 and 2011.

Preceded by Joseph Clemmons	Member of the Connecticut House of Representatives from the 140th District; January 8, 2003–January 7, 2007	Succeeded by Bruce Morris
