= Joseph Santo =

American politician

Member of the Connecticut Senate from the 25th district
- In office May 7, 1986 – January 7, 1987
- Preceded by: Andrew J. Santaniello, Jr.
- Succeeded by: John Atkin

Personal details
- Born: Norwalk, Connecticut, U.S.
- Party: Republican

Joseph Santo is a former Republican member of the Connecticut Senate, representing Norwalk and part of Darien, Connecticut in Connecticut's 25th District from 1986 to 1987. He won the seat in a special election to fill a vacancy caused by the death of State Senator Andrew J. Santaniello, Jr. He defeated John Atkin for the seat, but was defeated by Atkin later the same year in the general election.

After his term in the Connecticut Senate, he was elected to the Norwalk Common Council. He also served on the Norwalk Zoning Commission.

Preceded by Andrew J. Santaniello, Jr.	Connecticut Senate; 25th Senate District; 1986–1987	Succeeded by Robert Genuario
