= Jennie Cave =

American politician

33rd Mayor of Norwalk, Connecticut
- In office 1975–1977
- Preceded by: Donald J. Irwin
- Succeeded by: William A. Collins

Personal details
- Born: November 25, 1902 Norwalk, Connecticut
- Died: June 3, 2001 (aged 98) Norwalk, Connecticut
- Party: Democratic; Connecticut Independent
- Spouse: Captain Lloyd G. Cave

Jennie Ferris Bodwell Cave (November 25, 1902 – June 3, 2001) was the first woman to be elected mayor of Norwalk, Connecticut in the city's history. She ran several times, and served one term.

== Legacy ==
The Common Council Chambers in City Hall is named for her.

Preceded by Donald J. Irwin	Mayor of Norwalk, Connecticut; 1975–1977	Succeeded by William A. Collins
