= Gerald Lamb =

American politician

Gerald A. Lamb
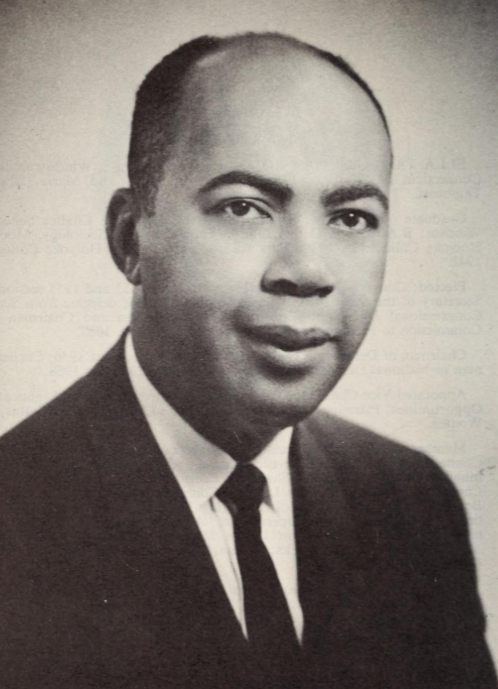

Connecticut State Treasurer
- In office January 9, 1963 – February 11, 1970
- Governor: John N. Dempsey
- Preceded by: Donald J. Irwin
- Succeeded by: John A. Iorio

Personal details
- Born: August 25, 1924 Elizabeth City, North Carolina, US
- Died: March 24, 2014 (aged 89) Chesapeake, Virginia, US
- Party: Democratic Party
- Education: Kerpel School of Dental Technology (New York)
- Occupation: Politician, banker

Gerald A. Lamb (August 25, 1924 – March 24, 2014) was an American politician and banker who was Connecticut state treasurer from 1963 to 1970. Lamb broke new ground as the first African American elected to statewide office in Connecticut and as only the third African American in the United States to be elected to the office of state treasurer. In 1970, he became the first African American to serve as state bank commissioner.

== Early life and career ==
Lamb was born on August 25, 1924, in Elizabeth City, North Carolina. His parents were Thomas and Addie Lamb, respectively a high school principal and a homemaker. Upon graduating high school in Elizabeth City, Lamb enlisted in the US Coast Guard and served from 1942 to 1946 as a chemical warfare specialist. After his honorable discharge, Lamb trained as a dental technician at the Kerpel School of Dental Technology in New York City.

In 1948, Lamb moved to Waterbury, Connecticut, where he worked his way up to general manager of Waterbury Dental Laboratories. He also met and married Verna I. Grier, Waterbury's first African American teacher. The couple had one daughter, Genero Elaine, who was born in 1954.

== Local political career ==
Lamb became active in the Waterbury community. He served on the boards of the local American Red Cross and NAACP, chaired the board of the Pearl Street Neighborhood House and the Waterbury Negro Business and Professional Men's Association, and served as secretary of the Connecticut Federation of Negro Democratic Clubs for three years. Lamb won his first election, to the Waterbury Board of Aldermen, in 1959. He was reelected in 1961. He concurrently served as acting mayor (1959–61) and member of the Waterbury Board of Parks Commission (1959–62).

== State political career ==
In 1962, Lamb was elected Connecticut State Treasurer—the first African American elected to statewide office in Connecticut and the first Black state treasurer in the United States since the Reconstruction era. A lifelong Democrat, Lamb defeated his Republican opponent, William D. Graham, receiving 551,369 votes to Graham's 478,444 votes. Reelected in 1966, Lamb served through 1970. As treasurer, he administered an annual budget of $300 million and was responsible for the state's bonds, investments, and spending on capital improvements. He also advocated for affordable housing and more equitable access to bank loans for African Americans.

In 1964, President Lyndon B. Johnson appointed Lamb a special ambassador to Venezuela to attend the presidential inauguration of Raúl Leoni. In 1965, Lamb attended the Selma to Montgomery civil rights marches as the State of Connecticut's official representative. President Johnson appointed him to the Federal Reserve's Consumer Advisory Council in 1967.

On February 11, 1970, Lamb resigned as treasurer to accept an appointment by Governor John N. Dempsey to serve as State Bank Commissioner, becoming the first African American to serve in this office. Effective the day of Lamb's resignation, Dempsey appointed fellow Waterbury Democrat John A. Iorio to serve out the remainder of Lamb's term as treasurer.

== Business career ==
In 1971, Lamb was hired as a senior vice president at Connecticut Bank & Trust (CB&T), the largest bank in Connecticut at the time. Lamb oversaw public, government, and community relations and corporate social responsibility. In 1974, while serving on the board of the Hartford Chamber of Commerce, Lamb led an effort to encourage Chamber members to patronize minority-owned establishments. In the 1970s, he served on the Board for State Academic Awards, which granted associate and bachelor degrees to nontraditional students. The program became Charter Oak State College in 1980 and received accreditation two years later, while Lamb chaired the board. He was campaign treasurer for Democratic governors William A. O'Neill and Ella Grasso.

== Personal life ==
After retiring from CB&T in 1989, Lamb divided his time between Raleigh, North Carolina, and Martha's Vineyard. He died in Chesapeake, Virginia, on March 24, 2014, at the age of 89.

Lamb was Episcopalian.

Party political offices
Preceded by John A. Speziale	Democratic nominee for Connecticut State Treasurer; 1962, 1966	Succeeded by John F. Merchant
Political offices
Preceded by Philip Hewes	Connecticut State Banking Commissioner; 1970–1971	Succeeded by James E. Hagen
Preceded by Donald J. Irwin	State Treasurer of Connecticut; 1963–1970	Succeeded by John A. Iorio
