= Thomas C. O'Connor =

American politician (1927–2001)

35th Mayor of Norwalk, Connecticut
- In office 1982–1983
- Preceded by: William A. Collins
- Succeeded by: William A. Collins

Member of the Connecticut House of Representatives from the 140th District
- In office 1978–1981
- Preceded by: William A. Collins
- Succeeded by: John Atkin

Personal details
- Born: October 9, 1937 Norwalk, Connecticut, U.S.
- Died: January 16, 2001 (aged 73) Norwalk, Connecticut, U.S.
- Party: Republican and Conservative Party
- Spouse: Jean Vadas O'Connor
- Children: Daniel T. O'Connor, Colleen O'Connor Caranci
- Education: Fairfield University

Thomas C. O'Connor (October 9, 1927 – January 16, 2001) was a one term Republican mayor of Norwalk, Connecticut from 1981 to 1983. He had previously served a term in the Connecticut House of Representatives from the 140th District. He was a junior high school history teacher in the Norwalk public schools for 35 years.

== Early life and family ==
He was the son of Dorothy Page O'Connor of Norwalk. O'Connor attended St. Mary School, Center Junior High School, and Norwalk High School where he played football. He was a graduate of Fairfield University in its first graduating class. He served two tours of duty with the U. S. Navy Air Force, first in World War II and then in the Korean War. He was a history teacher in the junior high school and middle school levels in the Norwalk school system for more than thirty-five years, and also worked nights and weekends for many years as a new car salesperson in Norwalk.

== Political career ==
O' Connor served as a member of the Norwalk Common Council. In 1974, he was defeated in his race for the seat representing the 140th district in the Connecticut House of Representatives to Democrat William Collins. When Collins resigned his house seat in 1977 to take office as mayor, O'Connor won the seat in a special election over Democrat Alberta Hawkins and took office on February 2, 1978. He served on the Committees on General Law and Public Personnel and Military Affairs. O'Connor was a candidate for mayor in 1979, but lost to Collins. On November 3, 1981 O'Connor was elected mayor, defeating the incumbent Collins and Independent Henry F. B. Higgins. He took office in 1982.

== Post mayoral activity ==
O'Connor was a major force in resurrecting a World War II Honor Roll in Norwalk, and bringing it up to date four decades after it had been dismantled, and in revitalizing a memorial to a Vietnam War of Honor recipients in the city of Norwalk. In 1988, the Honor Roll of veterans from World War II, Korea and Vietnam was completed. It lists the names of 6,687 World War II members, 340 from Korea and 429 from Vietnam.

== Awards ==
- He was honored by the Norwalk Old-Timers Athletic Association in 2000. He was well known for his support for athletics by young people in Norwalk. He was a football official for high school games in Fairfield County and he rarely missed a sporting event of the Norwalk High School athletic teams.
- In 2000, O'Connor was named to the Norwalk High School Alumni Association Teacher Honor Roll

== Legacy ==
- In January 2001, The Connecticut General Assembly passed House Resolution No. 11 "A RESOLUTION EXPRESSING SYMPATHY ON THE DEATH OF THOMAS C. O'CONNOR"
- He was a founder of the Heritage Wall in Norwalk and the park adjacent to it is named Thomas C. O'Connor Park in his honor.

Preceded by William A. Collins	Member of the Connecticut House of Representatives from the 140th District; 1978–1981	Succeeded by John Atkin
Preceded by William A. Collins	Mayor of Norwalk, Connecticut; 1982–1983	Succeeded by William A. Collins
