= Larry Pemberton =

American politician

Larry Pemberton Jr.

Member of the Connecticut House of Representatives from the 139th district
- Incumbent
- Assumed office January 21, 2026
- Preceded by: Kevin Ryan

Personal details
- Born: 1973 or 1974 (age 52–53)
- Party: Democratic

Larry Pemberton Jr. (born c. 1973/1974) is an American politician and member of the Connecticut House of Representatives. A member of the Democratic Party, he was elected at the special election in January 2026.

Pemberton was born in Norwich and raised in Montville. He is a member and treasurer of the Eastern Pequot Tribal Nation. His brother in law is the tribal chairman of the Mashantucket Pequots and owner of the Foxwoods Resort Casino. Pemberton is a community organizer and has worked in human services, hospitality, administration and transportation.

The Connecticut House of Representatives' 139th district, which consists of Ledyard, Montville and Norwich, became vacant following the death of incumbent Kevin Ryan in November 2025. Pemberton won the Democratic Party's nomination for the special election, despite being an unaffiliated voter, on December 3, 2025, and was also endorsed by the Working Families Party. He was elected to the Connecticut House of Representatives at the special election held on January 13, 2026, receiving 64% of votes. He was sworn in on January 21, 2026, becoming the first Native American member of the Connecticut General Assembly. He will serve-out the remainder of Ryan's term which expires in January 2027.

== Personal life ==
Pemberton is married and has two children. He lives in Uncasville, Montville.
