= Kadeem Roberts =

American politician

Member of the Connecticut House of Representatives from the 137th district
- Incumbent
- Assumed office January 4, 2023
- Preceded by: Chris Perone

Personal details
- Party: Democrat
- Education: Virginia Union University (BA), Fairfield University (MPA)

Kadeem Roberts is an American politician. He is a Democratic member of the Connecticut House of Representatives serving in the 137th district since 2023.
