= Agnes Simons =

American politician (died 1985)

Member of the Connecticut House of Representatives from the 139th district
- In office 1967–1973
- Preceded by: Seat created
- Succeeded by: Louis Padula

Personal details
- Born: Agnes J. Connair; 1906 or 1907 Pittsburgh, Pennsylvania, U.S.
- Died: October 11, 1985 (aged 78) Bridgeport, Connecticut, U.S.
- Party: Democratic
- Spouse: Edward J. Simons

Military service
- Branch/service: WAVES

Agnes Simons (née Connair; 1906 or 1907 – October 11, 1985) was an American politician who served in the Connecticut House of Representatives from 1967 to 1973, representing the 139th district as a Democrat. Simons was in the WAVES during World War II.
