= Janet M. Mills =

American politician (c. 1921–1991)

Janet Marsico Mills

Member of the Connecticut House of Representatives from the 140th district
- In office 1985–1987
- Preceded by: John Atkin
- Succeeded by: Douglas Mintz

Personal details
- Born: Circa 1921 Norwalk, Connecticut, U.S.
- Died: 1991 Norwalk, Connecticut, U.S.
- Party: Republican
- Spouse: David W. Mills
- Education: Merrill Business School

Janet Marsico Mills (c. 1921 – 1991) was an American politician who served as the Connecticut state representative for the 140th district from 1985 to 1986. A member of the Republican Party, she was a resident of Norwalk.

== Early life and family ==
Mills was born and raised in Norwalk. She married David W. Mills when he returned from serving in World War II in 1945.

== Political career ==
Mills was president of the Norwalk Republican Women's Association, and of the Norwalk Taxpayer's League. She was a member of the coalition for Children and Youth, Inc., and a member of the Education and Housing for Fairfield 2000 organization and the State Legislative Task Force on Interracial Adoption. She served as a commissioner of the Norwalk Housing Authority from 1983 to 1987, and as its vice-chairman.

She made her first run for elected office in 1982 against incumbent Democrat John Atkin, but was defeated.

She tried again in 1984, and defeated Atkin for the seat.

Mills was defeated for reelection in 1986 by Douglas Mintz.

Preceded by John Atkin	Member of the Connecticut House of Representatives from the 140th District; 1985 – 1987	Succeeded by Douglas Mintz
