= Connecticut's 147th House of Representatives district =

American legislative district

Connecticut's 147th State House of Representatives district
Representative
| Matt Blumenthal; D |

Connecticut's 147th House of Representatives district elects one member of the Connecticut House of Representatives. It encompasses part of the city of Stamford and has been represented by Democrat Matt Blumenthal since 2019.

== List of representatives ==
| Representative | Party | Years | District home | Note |
|---|---|---|---|---|
| Thomas E. Tierney | Democratic | 1967 – 1969 | Norwalk | |
| John Fabrizio | Republican | 1969 – 1973 | Norwalk | Redistricted to the 140th District |
| James F. Bingham | Republican | 1973 – 1975 | Stamford | Redistricted from the 157th District |
| Chris Shays | Republican | 1975 – 1987 | Stamford | Elected to U.S. Congress |
| Christopher Burnham | Republican | 1987 – 1993 | Stamford | Served as State Treasurer |
| Michael Fedele | Republican | 1993 – 2003 | Stamford | Served as Lieutenant Governor |
| Donald Sherer | Republican | 2003 – 2007 | Stamford | |
| William Tong | Democratic | 2007 – 2019 | Stamford | Serving as Attorney General |
| Matt Blumenthal | Democratic | 2019 – present | Stamford | Son of U.S. Senator Richard Blumenthal |

== Recent Elections ==
=== 2022 ===
2022 Connecticut State House of Representatives election, 147th District
| Party | Candidate | Votes | % |
|---|---|---|---|
| Democratic | Matt Blumenthal (incumbent) | 5,265 | 60.19 |
| Republican | Abraham David Viera | 3,482 | 39.81 |
| Total votes | | 8,747 | 100.0 |

=== 2020 ===
2020 Connecticut State House of Representatives election, District 147
| Party | Candidate | Votes | % |
|---|---|---|---|
| Democratic | Matt Blumenthal (incumbent) | 8,451 | 62.02 |
| Republican | Dan Maymin | 5,176 | 37.98 |
| Total votes | | 13,627 | 100.00 |
| Democratic hold | | | |

=== 2018 ===
2018 Connecticut House of Representatives election, District 147
| Party | Candidate | Votes | % |
|---|---|---|---|
| Democratic | Matt Blumenthal | 6,187 | 58.9 |
| Republican | Anzelmo Graziosi | 4,326 | 41.1 |
| Total votes | | 10,513 | 100.00 |
| Democratic hold | | | |

=== 2016 ===
2016 Connecticut House of Representatives election, District 147
| Party | Candidate | Votes | % |
|---|---|---|---|
| Democratic | William Tong (Incumbent) | 8,258 | 100.00 |
| Total votes | | 8,258 | 100.00 |
| Democratic hold | | | |

=== 2014 ===
2014 Connecticut House of Representatives election, District 147
| Party | Candidate | Votes | % |
|---|---|---|---|
| Democratic | William Tong (Incumbent) | 3,905 | 51.0 |
| Republican | Dennis Mahoney | 3,553 | 46.4 |
| Independent Party | Dennis Mahoney | 198 | 2.6 |
| Total votes | | 7,656 | 100.00 |
| Democratic hold | | | |

=== 2012 ===
2012 Connecticut House of Representatives election, District 147
| Party | Candidate | Votes | % |
|---|---|---|---|
| Democratic | William Tong (Incumbent) | 6,214 | 56.9 |
| Republican | Dennis Mahoney | 4,708 | 43.1 |
| Total votes | | 10,922 | 100.00 |
| Democratic hold | | | |
