= Hall High School (Connecticut) =

William H. Hall High School
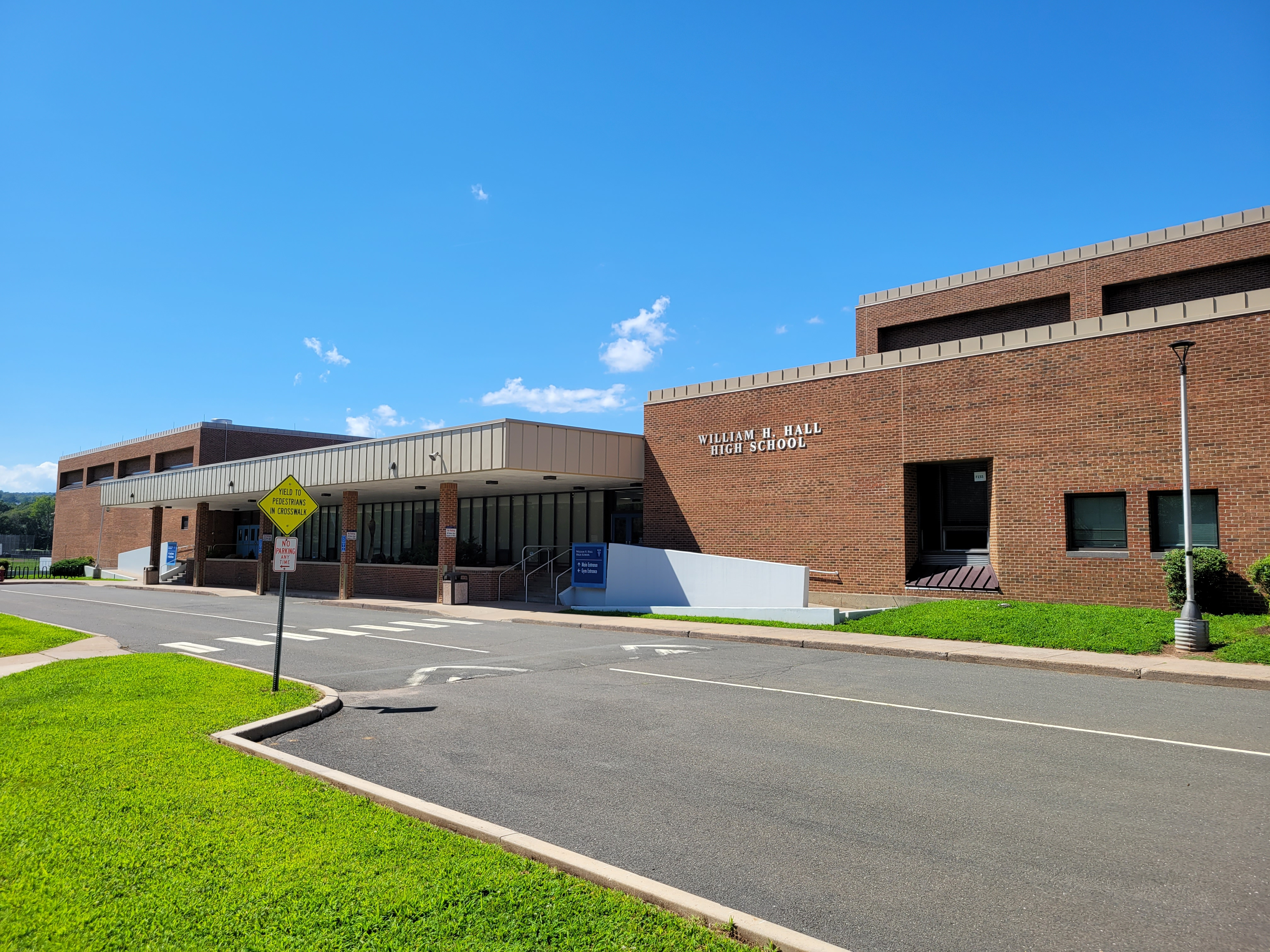

Location
- 975 North Main Street; West Hartford, Connecticut 06117; United States; 41°47′41″N 72°45′05″W

Information
- Type: Public high school
- Established: 1924 (102 years ago)
- Founder: William H. Hall
- School district: West Hartford Public Schools
- CEEB code: 070900
- Principal: Sarah Isaacs
- Faculty: 99.85 (on an FTE basis)
- Grades: 9–12
- Enrollment: 1,393 (2023–2024)
- Student to teacher ratio: 13.95
- Colors: Blue and white
- Team name: Titans
- Newspaper: Hall Record
- Yearbook: Hallmarks
- Website: hall.whps.org
- Source: except where noted

William H. Hall High School, also known as Hall High, is a four-year public high school located in West Hartford, in the U.S. state of Connecticut. Opened in 1924, it was named after William Hutchins Hall, who was a teacher, principal, and superintendent of schools in West Hartford. The school colors are blue and white, and the school’s mascot is the Titans, formerly the Warriors, after the Board Of Education voted to change it on February 1, 2022. It is one of two public high schools in the West Hartford Public Schools, the other being Conard High School.

== Enrollment ==
The 2023–2024 demographic profile is as follows: White 56.4%, Hispanic 18.4%, Asian American 10.6%, Black 8.2%, two or more races 5.9%, American Indian/Alaskan Native 0.1%, and Hawaiian Native/Pacific Islander 0.1%.

Student body composition as of 2026
Race and ethnicity	Total
White	56.4%
Hispanic	18.4%
Asian	10.6%
Black	8.2%
Two or more Races	5.9%
Native Hawaiian/Pacific Islander	0.1%
American Indian/Alaska Native	0.1%
Sex	Total
Male	52%
Female	48%
Income	Total
Economically disadvantaged	23%
Free Lunch Program	19%
Reduced-Price Lunch Program	5%

== Athletics and clubs ==
Hall High School is part of the CCC, the Central Connecticut Conference competing in the west division. The Board of Education added varsity sports for girls in January 1972.

=== Soccer ===
In soccer, Hall won the state championship in 1980, 2019, and 2023. In 2018, they were state championship runner-ups. In 2020, the boys soccer team finished nationally ranked on several polls, including being ranked 3rd in the country, and as the highest ranked public school on the TopDrawerSoccer Fall Fab 50 rankings.

=== Ice Hockey ===
Hall's boys' ice hockey team captured the CIAC Division II ice hockey state championship in 1993.

=== Cross Country ===
Hall's boys' cross country team has won the Central Connecticut Conference Championships five of the last six years dating back to 2012. Hall won the Class LL State Championship in cross country for the first time in 2021, and then repeated in 2022. In 2022, Hall also won the CT State Open Championship and the New England Championship in cross country.

=== Indoor Track ===
Hall's Boys' indoor track team won 5 consecutive CIAC Class LL Championships between 2019 and 2024 (no competition in 2021 due to Covid-19), as well as the CT State Open Championships in 2019, 2022, and 2023.

=== Chess ===
In 2011, Hall's chess team won the state championship.

=== State championships ===
Team	Year
Boys Soccer	1951, 1952, 1953, 1955, 1960, 1963, 1964, 1980, 2019, 2023
Boys Indoor Track	1955, 2017, 2018, 2019, 2020, 2022, 2023, 2024
Boys Outdoor Track	2018, 2019, 2021, 2022, 2023, 2024
Boys Tennis	1979, 1992, 1993, 2007
Boys Golf	1952, 1973, 1977
Boys Cross Country	2021, 2022
Girls Cross Country	1987, 2019
Wrestling	1976, 1987
Girls Outdoor Track	1986
Girls Golf	2021
Girls Gymnastics	2004
Boys Ice Hockey	1993

== Pops 'n Jazz ==
Hall High School has a renowned jazz program, which stages an annual production called Pops 'n Jazz that regularly sells over 3,000 tickets every year. They have also won the Essentially Ellington High School Jazz Band Competition and Festival twice, in 1998 and 2000. In 2023 they won the Charles Mingus Festival & High School Competition. The band has performed for the president at the White House, appeared in Ken Burns' documentary film "Jazz."

== Academic accomplishments ==
- Blue Ribbon School in 1984–85.
- Ranked as the 11th best school in the state of Connecticut by U.S. News & World Report in 2018.

== Notable alumni ==
- Natalie Anderson, Survivor: San Juan del Sur winner
- David Alan Basche, actor
- Shari Cantor, mayor
- Chris Carrabba, musician and lead singer of the band Dashboard Confessional attended freshman year
- Dave Chameides, Emmy Award winning Director and Cameraman
- Jacob Fox, mathematician
- Joel Frahm, jazz tenor saxophonist
- Harvey Harris, American painter and art professor
- Jonathan Harris, former Connecticut state senator and former mayor of West Hartford
- Peter Hotez, public health researcher and vaccine developer
- Charlie Kaufman, screenwriter, director
- Matthew Yang King, actor, producer, director, and writer
- Marc Lasry (Class of 1977), billionaire co-founder/CEO of Avenue Capital Group, and co-owner of the NBA's Milwaukee Bucks
- Frank Luntz, political and communications consultant, pollster, and pundit
- Jimmy Macbride, jazz drummer
- Brad Mehldau, Grammy award winning jazz pianist
- Jacob Neusner, scholar of Judaism
- Noah Preminger, jazz saxophonist
- Jessica Rosenworcel, Commissioner of the Federal Communications Commission
- Michael Schur, Emmy Award winning actor, television producer, and writer.
- Roger Sperry, neuropsychologist and Nobel Prize laureate
- David H. Steinberg, film and television writer and producer
- Allyson Swaby, professional soccer player and captain of Jamaican national team
- Chantelle Swaby, professional soccer player
- Patrick Zimmerli, composer
