= Fay Honey Knopp =

American prison abolitionist (1918–1995)

Fay "Honey" Knopp (née Irving, August 15, 1918 – August 10, 1995) was an American Quaker minister, peace and civil rights advocate, and prison abolitionist.

== Early life and education ==
Fay Birdie Irving was born on August 15, 1918, in Bridgeport, Connecticut, to Mollie Feldman and Alexander Ajolo Irving, a Russian-Jewish emigré. She graduated from Warren Harding High School as valedictorian in 1935. After high school, she became a women's fashion buyer and in 1941 married Burton Knopp. Together they had two children, daughter Sari Knopp Biklen (1945–2014), and Connecticut politician Alex Knopp. She studied at the Hartford Art School, the New School for Social Research and the University of California, Los Angeles.

== Career ==
In 1939, she attended a Quaker peace demonstration as a Gandhian pacifist. In 1955, Knopp began visiting imprisoned conscientious objectors. In 1962, she traveled to Geneva, Switzerland as part of a Women Strike for Peace delegation, protesting the effects of nuclear testing on children's health. Also that year, Knopp became a Quaker, serving as a prison visitor in the Federal penal system through her designation as a "minister of record."

In 1968, with Bob Horton, Knopp co-founded Prisoner Visitation and Support to further that work, focusing initially on the increased number of imprisoned resisters to the Vietnam War. In 1976, Knopp founded the Prison Research Education Action Program and published the book Instead of Prisons: A Handbook for Abolitionists. The book includes three goals for abolitionists: prohibit the building of new prisons, reduce prison populations, and move away from incarceration as a solution.

In 1974, Knopp founded the Safer Society Program and was the director until 1993. The program's goal was to offer sex offenders treatment through an international referral system to break the cycle of behavior rather than focus on punishment. A special residential high school program in Rutland, Vermont, for adolescent males who have exhibited "sexual harming behaviors" is named the Fay Honey Knopp Memorial School in her honor.

Knopp served as director of the New York Region of the American Friends Service Committee, and as projects director for AFSC's National Peace Education Division in Philadelphia. Governor Ella Grasso named Knopp in 1978 as one of the 100 Outstanding Women of Connecticut.

Knopp died on August 10, 1995, in Shoreham, Vermont, age 76, from ovarian cancer. Her husband lived to be 93 and died in 2010.

== Reception ==
Most academic criminologists, even those with abolitionist sympathies, seem to have never heard of Fay Honey Knopp. Criminologist Harold E. Pepinsky mentions that he "had never read her work or seen it cited in the criminological literature." He now thinks that "she ought to be ranked as one of the giants in U.S. criminology .... Her Quakerism, her radical feminism, and her prison abolitionism have reinforced and informed one another." Dutch criminologist Herman Bianchi remembered Knopp as a "Mother Teresa among abolitionists."

== Bibliography ==
- Instead of Prisons: A Handbook for Abolitionists, 1976
- Retraining Adult Sex Offenders: Methods & Models, 1984
- Community Solutions to Sexual Violence. Feminist/Abolitionist Perspectives
- When Your Wife Says No: Forced Sex in Marriage, 1994
- A Primer on the Complexities of Traumatic Memory of Childhood Sexual Abuse: A Psychobiological Approach, 1996
