= William A. Collins =

American politician (1935–2022)

34th and 36th Mayor of Norwalk, Connecticut
- In office 1977–1981
- Preceded by: Jennie Cave
- Succeeded by: Thomas C. O'Connor
- In office 1983–1987
- Preceded by: Thomas C. O'Connor
- Succeeded by: Frank Esposito

Member of the Connecticut House of Representatives from the 140th District
- In office 1974–1976
- Preceded by: John Fabrizio
- Succeeded by: Thomas C. O'Connor

Personal details
- Born: 1935 Norwalk, Connecticut, U.S.
- Died: July 2022 (aged 87) near Farmington, New Mexico, U.S.
- Party: Democratic
- Spouse: Elizabeth Gibbs Collins
- Education: Lehigh University (B.S); Stanford University (M.B.A.)

William A. Collins (1935 – 21 July 2022) was a Democratic former two-term member of the Connecticut House of Representatives from the 140th assembly district and four-term mayor of Norwalk, Connecticut, from 1977 to 1981 and from 1983 to 1987. He founded Minuteman Media, which later became OtherWords, in 1998.

== Early life ==
He was born and raised in Norwalk, and graduated from Norwalk High School. He graduated from Lehigh University in accounting, and as a member of Phi Beta Kappa. He graduated with an MBA from Stanford University. He served in the US Army as a Finance Officer.

== Political career ==
Collins was a member of Norwalk's Common Council for three terms. He served as a member of the Connecticut House of Representatives representing the 140th House district for two terms, having defeated challenger Republican Thomas C. O'Connor in 1974 and Republican Edward Gilmore in 1976. In 1977, he defeated incumbent Independent Party mayor Jennie Cave. He gave up his seat in the middle of his second term to serve as mayor of Norwalk, Connecticut. He served two terms and was defeated for re-election by Thomas C. O'Connor in 1981. He then defeated incumbent O'Connor in 1983 and served another two terms until 1987. His wife Elizabeth Gibbs Collins served as city clerk for four of those years He was the first vice president of the Connecticut Conference of Mayors.

== Journalism career ==
He founded Minuteman Media, which later became OtherWords, in 1998.

== Death ==
During a road trip to the southwest, Collins was killed in a car accident July 22, 2022.

Preceded by John Fabrizio	Member of the Connecticut House of Representatives from the 140th House district 1974–1977	Succeeded by Thomas C. O'Connor
Preceded by Jennie Cave	Mayor of Norwalk, Connecticut; 1977–1981	Succeeded by Thomas C. O'Connor
Preceded by Thomas C. O'Connor	Mayor of Norwalk, Connecticut; 1983–1987	Succeeded by Frank Esposito
