= Shari Cantor =

American politician

West Hartford Mayor
- Incumbent
- Assumed office 2016
- Preceded by: Scott Slifka

West Hartford Deputy Mayor
- In office 2014–2016

Personal details
- Born: 1960 (age 65–66)
- Party: Democratic
- Spouse: Michael Cantor
- Children: 4
- Education: University of Connecticut

Shari Cantor (born 1960) is a Certified Public Accountant and politician from West Hartford, Connecticut. She is the Mayor of West Hartford. She is the chair of the University of Connecticut board of trustees.

== Early life and education ==
A native of West Hartford, Cantor attended Hall High School. She graduated magna cum laude from the University of Connecticut (UConn) with a degree in accounting. She is Jewish.

== Family ==
She met her husband, Michael Cantor, while studying at the University of Connecticut.

They have four children together, all boys. Their youngest son was born with a serious heart defect, which has led to her volunteer leadership with the Connecticut Children's Medical Center and the American Heart Association.

== Business career ==
She has worked at Coopers & Lybrand and Cigna.

== Political career ==
Cantor joined the West Hartford town council in 2004 and became Deputy Mayor in 2012. In 2016 she became Mayor of West Hartford, her first two projects were the designation of a town Poet Laureate and making the town a “heart safe community." Even though West Hartford is an affluent town of 63,000 the office is unpaid. She is the de facto leader of the West Hartford Democrats. Challenges during her term as mayor have included conflict with the Metropolitan District of Connecticut and dealing with the effects of a decrease in state education aid.

=== Tax increases ===
Under Cantors watch taxes in West Hartford have increased by 3 percent in FY 2023 budget, 1.86 percent in FY 2024 budget, and 3.49 percent for FY 2025 budget.

== Awards and recognition ==
She has been on the UConn board of trustees since 2014 and as of May 2019 she was one of two candidates under consideration to replace resigning chairman Thomas E. Kruger. Kruger had named her as his preferred successor over lobbyist and former Connecticut House Speaker Thomas D. Ritter, writing that "it’s time for the University board to be led by a woman.”

- Cantor was inducted into the UConn Hall of Fame in 2018.
- Cantor was the winner of top honors nationally at the U.S. Conference of Mayors 14th Annual Climate Protection Awards.
