= Prisoner Visitation and Support =

Quaker-founded non-profit prisoner-support organization

Prisoner Visitation and Support (PVS) is a non-profit organization based in Philadelphia. Trained PVS volunteers visit prisoners in the United States Federal Prison system and military prisons. They offer companionship and friendship, with no religious or other agenda. Their particular focus is prisoners who don't receive regular visits, are facing long sentences, and/or are in solitary confinement.

PVS visitors come from a variety of religious and non-religious backgrounds, and the organization is supported by a wide variety of religious groups. Since 1972, PVS has enjoyed blanket permission from the Federal Bureau of Prisons to visit at all federal prisons and with any federal prisoner in the United States. In 1975, the Department of Defense granted PVS similar access to all military prisons.

Prisoner Visitation and Support was founded in 1968 by long-time prison visitors and activists Fay Honey Knopp and Bob Horton, in part as a support to conscientious objectors and other draft resisters in the Federal system. As the Vietnam era ended and conscientious objectors were released, the group's mission expanded to embrace all federal and military prisoners in need of support and visitation.
