= Joseph Clemmons =

American politician (born 1929)

Joseph D. Clemmons, Sr.

Member of the Connecticut House of Representatives from the 140th district
- In office 1997 – January 8, 2003
- Preceded by: Donnie Sellers
- Succeeded by: Joseph Mann

Personal details
- Born: 1929 (age 96–97) Brooklyn, New York, U.S.
- Party: Democratic
- Spouse(s): Loretta G Shields (1931–1985); Geraldine Clemmons; Frankie Marie Collier
- Children: five children Joseph, Jr., Angela
- Education: Long Island University (BA in Spanish, 1952); Yale Divinity School (MA in divinity, 1989); Colgate Rochester Divinity School (D Min)

Joseph D. Clemmons, Sr. (born 1929) is a former three term Democratic member of the Connecticut House of Representatives from Norwalk, Connecticut's 140th assembly district from 1997 to 2003. He also served on the Norwalk Common Council beginning in 1995.

== Early life and family ==
He is the son of Frank Clemmons, founder of the First Church of God In Christ in Brooklyn, New York. He attended Long Island University and Howard University. He earned a Master of Divinity degree from Yale Divinity School and a Doctor of Ministry degree from Colgate Rochester Divinity School. Clemmons was ordained by Bishop O.M. Kelly in 1952. In 1975, he was a Martin Luther King fellow, and in that capacity, he traveled to West Africa, Nigeria and Ghana. He was an Elementary School Teacher in Baltimore and a Middle and High School Teacher in Bridgeport and Norwalk. In 1979, he retired as a certified teacher of Spanish to devote full-time to the ministry. He is a former president of the Hampton University Ministers' Conference, in Hampton, Virginia and he continues to serve on its executive board. He was inducted into the Morehouse College of Preachers in 1988. Clemmons is the founder of Miracle Temple Church of God in Christ in Norwalk.

== Political career ==
Clemmons was elected to the Norwalk Common Council in 1995. He was elected to the Connecticut House of Representatives in a special election in February 1997 and was re-elected in November 1998 defeating Republican Jon J. Velez and also re-elected in November 2000.

== Other offices ==
- Norwalk Fire Department chaplain
- Member, board of directors of Norwalk Economic Opportunity Now (NEON)
- Founder of Pivot Ministries, a Christ-centered drug program
- Executive director and board member of Norwalk Area Ministry
- Elected as an associate justice of the nine-member judiciary board of the Church of God in Christ World-wide. He was elected to a seven-year term in 2004.

Preceded by Donnie Sellers	Member of the Connecticut House of Representatives from the 140th District; 1997 – January 8, 2003	Succeeded by Joseph Mann
