= Donald Sherer =

American politician

Donald B. Sherer (September 24, 1947 - December 14, 2025) was an American lawyer and politician.

Sherer, representing the Republican Party, defeated Democratic Party candidate Carmen Domonkos in the 2002 general election for Connecticut's 147th House of Representatives district, and succeeded Michael Fedele, who left the seat open to run for the Connecticut Senate. Sherer won a second term against Democrat Peter Gasparino in 2004. In 2006, Sherer lost to William Tong. He previously served on the Stamford Board of Representatives from 1975 to 1979 and again from 1991 to 2001.

== Personal life ==
He was Jewish.

Connecticut House of Representatives
Preceded by Michael Fedele	Member of the Connecticut House of Representatives from the 147th district 2003–2007	Succeeded by William Tong
