= Michael Fedele =

Italian-American politician (born 1955)

107th Lieutenant Governor of Connecticut
- In office January 3, 2007 – January 5, 2011
- Governor: Jodi Rell
- Preceded by: Kevin B. Sullivan
- Succeeded by: Nancy Wyman

Member of the Connecticut House of Representatives from the 147th district
- In office January 6, 1993 – January 3, 2003
- Preceded by: Christopher Burnham
- Succeeded by: Donald Sherer

Personal details
- Born: March 30, 1955 (age 71) Minturno, Italy
- Party: Republican
- Spouse: Carol Fedele
- Profession: Businessman

Michael Fedele (born March 30, 1955) is an Italian-American politician. A member of the Republican Party, he served as the 107th Lieutenant Governor of Connecticut from 2007 to 2011. As of 2024, Mr. Fedele is the last Republican to win a statewide election in Connecticut.

Following the decision on November 9, 2009, by incumbent Governor M. Jodi Rell not to seek re-election, Fedele announced his candidacy to seek the office of governor in the 2010 Connecticut gubernatorial election. He was a candidate in the party's primary contest, but narrowly lost the nomination on August 10 to former United States Ambassador to Ireland Tom Foley. Fedele ran for Mayor of Stamford in 2013. He lost the election to David Martin.

== Career ==
Fedele is the founder and CEO of Stamford-based Pinnacle Group, a nationwide IT firm. Fedele started his public service as a member of Stamford's Board of Representatives, serving the city's 13th District from 1987–1991. Fedele represented Stamford's 147th District in the Connecticut House of Representatives from 1992 until 2002. He ran for the Connecticut Senate that year, losing to Democrat Andrew J. McDonald. On January 3, 2007, Fedele was sworn in as Connecticut's 107th Lieutenant Governor, serving with Governor Rell.

In 2009, Fedele received the Prescott Bush Award, the highest honor that the Connecticut Republican Party awards to a member of the Party. Boy's Town of Italy also honored Fedele with their 2009 Humanitarian of the Year Award.

== Education ==
Fedele attended Fairfield University and Norwalk State Technical College.

== Personal ==
Fedele is a native of Minturno, Italy. He has raised three children in his hometown of Stamford with his wife Carol.

Party political offices
Preceded by Jodi Rell	Republican nominee for Lieutenant Governor of Connecticut; 2006	Succeeded by Mark Boughton
Connecticut House of Representatives
Preceded by Christopher Burnham	Member of the Connecticut House of Representatives from the 147th district 1993–2003	Succeeded by Donald Sherer
Political offices
Preceded by Kevin B. Sullivan	Lieutenant Governor of Connecticut; 2007–2011	Succeeded by Nancy Wyman
