= Bruce Morris =

American politician

Member of the Connecticut House of Representatives from the 140th district
- In office 2007–2019
- Preceded by: Joseph Mann
- Succeeded by: Travis Simms

Personal details
- Born: Norwalk, Connecticut, U.S.
- Party: Democratic
- Spouse: Gail

Bruce V. Morris was a six-term Democratic member of the Connecticut House of Representatives representing Norwalk, Connecticut in the 140th assembly district from 2007 to 2019. He was deputy speaker of the House of Representatives and on the following committees: finance revenue and bonding; judiciary; human services; legislative management. He was named assistant majority whip during his second term and served in that capacity until his promotion to deputy majority whip in 2012. Morris served as Chairman of the Connecticut General Assembly Black and Puerto Rican Caucus during the 2015-2016 session. He served the previous three sessions as vice-chairman. Morris serves as an assistant pastor at Macedonia Church in Norwalk. He served as Director of Human Relations for the Norwalk school system beginning November 5, 1998 until September 2016. He then became District School Climate Coordinator until June 30, 2017. He was also an elected executive board member of the National Black Caucus of State Legislators.

He defeated Republican Richard A. McQuaid in 2006.

== Awards ==
- Connecticut League of Conservation Voters award for perfect support of environmental initiatives in 2011
- Dental Hygienists – 2011, 2010 Legislative Awards
- Omega Psi Phi - 2008 Citizen of the Year
- Parent Leadership Training Institute - 2008 Leadership Service Award
- United Way
- Connecticut Public Housing Network
- NAACP - 100 Most Influential Blacks in Connecticut
