= Abner W. Sibal =

American politician (1921–2000)

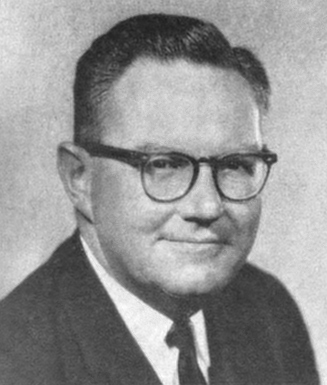

Member of the U.S. House of Representatives from Connecticut's 4th district
- In office January 3, 1961 – January 3, 1965
- Preceded by: Donald J. Irwin
- Succeeded by: Donald J. Irwin

Member of the Connecticut State Senate from the 26th district
- In office 1957–1961
- Preceded by: Louis Lemaire
- Succeeded by: Marjorie Farmer

Personal details
- Born: Abner Woodruff Sibal; April 11, 1921 Ridgewood, New York, U.S.
- Died: January 27, 2000 (aged 78) Alexandria, Virginia, U.S.
- Party: Republican

Military service
- Branch/service: U. S. Army
- Battles/wars: World War II

Abner Woodruff Sibal (April 11, 1921 – January 27, 2000) was a liberal member of the United States House of Representatives from Connecticut's 4th congressional district. He served from 1961 to 1965. He was defeated in 1964. He also served as a member of the Connecticut Senate from 1956 to 1960, and a delegate to the Republican National Convention from Connecticut in 1964.

== Biography ==
Born in Ridgewood, New York, Sibal graduated from Norwalk High School in 1938. He attended Wesleyan University, earning an A.B., in 1943, and St. John's University School of Law, earning an LL.B., in 1949. He enlisted in the United States Army in March 1943, served in the European and Pacific Theaters of World War II, and was discharged as a first lieutenant in September 1946.

He was admitted to the Connecticut bar in 1949 and to the Federal bar in 1965. He served as prosecuting attorney in Norwalk City Court from 1951 to 1955, and as corporation counsel for the city of Norwalk from 1959 to 1960.

Sibal began his political career as a member of Connecticut Senate from 1956 to 1960, serving as minority leader the last two years. He also served as chairman of the Connecticut Commission on Corporation Law in 1959. He served as delegate to each Connecticut Republican State Convention from 1952 to 1968, and as delegate to Republican National Convention, 1964.

Sibal was elected as a Republican to the Eighty-Seventh and Eighty-Eighth Congresses (January 3, 1961 – January 3, 1965). He was an unsuccessful candidate for reelection in 1964 to the Eighty-Ninth Congress, and was again the GOP nominee in 1966. In both 1968 and 1970, Sibal was an unsuccessful candidate for U.S. Senator at the Republican state convention.

Sibal served as general counsel for the Equal Employment Opportunity Commission from 1975 to 1978, before resuming the private practice of law. He died in Alexandria, Virginia, on January 27, 2000.

U.S. House of Representatives
Preceded by Donald J. Irwin	Member of the U.S. House of Representatives from Connecticut's 4th congressional district 1961–1965	Succeeded by Donald J. Irwin
Political offices
Preceded by Louis Lemaire	Member of the Connecticut Senate from the 26th District; 1957–1961	Succeeded by Marjorie Farmer
