= Anne Streeter =

American politician (1926–2023)

Member of the Connecticut Senate from the 5th district
- In office 1983–1987
- Preceded by: Clifton A. Leonhardt
- Succeeded by: Kevin Sullivan

Mayor of West Hartford, Connecticut
- In office 1975–1981
- Preceded by: Catherine Reynolds
- Succeeded by: Charles Matties

Personal details
- Born: Anne Paul; July 21, 1926 Philadelphia, Pennsylvania, U.S
- Died: May 22, 2023 (aged 96) Southington, Connecticut, U.S
- Party: Republican
- Spouse: Ronald M. Streeter (m. 1949; died 2004)
- Children: 5
- Education: Smith College (B.A.)

Anne Streeter (née Paul; July 21, 1926 – May 22, 2023) was an American politician from Connecticut. From 1975 to 1981, she served as mayor of West Hartford, Connecticut, and from 1983 to 1987, she served in the Connecticut State Senate, where she represented the 5th district as a Republican.

== Personal life and education ==
Streeter was born Anne Paul on July 21, 1926, in Philadelphia, Pennsylvania. She graduated from Smith College in 1948 with a bachelor's degree in history and government. In 1949, she married Ronald M. Streeter, and together they had five children. The two were married until Ronald died in 2004.

Streeter was the granddaughter of Henry Neill Paul, patent lawyer and Shakespearean scholar, great-granddaughter of Joseph S. Harris, American surveyor and railroad executive, and great-great-great-great-granddaughter of Persifor Frazer, Revolutionary War officer.

Streeter died on May 22, 2023, in Southington, Connecticut. She was 96.

== Political career ==
From 1973 to 1975, Streeter served on the town council of West Hartford, Connecticut.

In 1975, Streeter was elected mayor of West Hartford. She was the second woman to hold the position, having directly succeeded the first, Catherine Reynolds. Streeter left office in 1981 and was succeeded by Charles Matties.

Streeter was first elected to the Connecticut State Senate in 1982, and she served for two terms representing the 5th district as a Republican. She did not run for reelection in 1986 and was succeeded by Democratic candidate Kevin Sullivan, a fellow former mayor of West Hartford.

== Books ==
Streeter, Anne P. Joseph S. Harris and the U.S. Northwest Boundary Survey, 1857-1861 Trafford Publishing, 2012. ISBN 978-1-4669-3621-8.
