= Alex Knopp =

American politician (born 1947)

Member of the Connecticut House of Representatives from the 139th district
- In office 1987–1993
- Preceded by: Jacob Rudolf
- Succeeded by: Kevin Ryan

Member of the Connecticut House of Representatives from the 137th district
- In office 1993–2001
- Preceded by: Sally Bolster
- Succeeded by: Bob Duff

38th Mayor of Norwalk, Connecticut
- In office 2001–2005
- Preceded by: Frank J. Esposito
- Succeeded by: Richard A. Moccia

Personal details
- Born: September 23, 1947 (age 78) Waterbury, Connecticut, U.S.
- Party: Democratic
- Spouse: Bette L. Bono (m. 1984)
- Children: 2
- Parent: Fay Honey Knopp
- Education: Wesleyan University (B.A. 1969); George Washington University Law School (JD 1981)

Alex A. Knopp (born September 23, 1947) is an American professor and former politician who served three terms as a member of the Connecticut House of Representatives from the 139th District, which encompassed Norwalk, from 1987 to 1993. He served another four terms from the 137th District between 1993 and 2001 for the Democratic Party.

From 2001 to 2005, Knopp served two terms as mayor of Norwalk, Connecticut. He was defeated for re-election on November 8, 2005, by Republican Richard A. Moccia.

== Early life and education ==
Knopp is the son of Burton and Fay Honey Knopp of Westport. Knopp received his B.A. from Wesleyan University in 1969, graduating Phi Beta Kappa and magna cum laude. He received his J.D. from George Washington University Law School in 1981, graduating as the valedictorian of his class.

== Career ==
From 2008-2012, Knopp served as the executive director of Dwight Hall at Yale. Since 2006, he has also been a visiting clinical lecturer at Yale Law School.

== Politics ==
Prior to serving as mayor, he served eight terms as a member of the Connecticut House of Representatives, first representing the 139th District for three terms from 1987 to 1993 and then due to redistricting, representing the 137th District for four more terms from 1993 to 2001.

He served two terms as Norwalk Councilman-at-Large from 1983 to 1987.

== Personal life ==
On March 25, 1984, Knopp married Bette L. Bono (b. 1950) in Norwalk, Connecticut. They have two children.

Political offices
Preceded by Frank J. Esposito	Mayor of Norwalk, Connecticut; 2001–05	Succeeded by Richard A. Moccia
Preceded by Sally Bolster (Redistricted)	Member of the Connecticut House of Representatives from the 137th district 1993–2001	Succeeded by Bob Duff
Preceded by Jacob Rudolf	Member of the Connecticut House of Representatives from the 139th district 1987–1993	Succeeded by Kevin Ryan (Redistricted)
