= Harvey Harris =

American painter and art professor

Harvey Sherman Harris (August 31, 1915 in Hartford, Connecticut - March 13, 1999 in Hartford) was an American artist and art professor. His art combined elements of Realism (arts) and Abstract Expressionism.

== Early life and education ==
Harris was a son of Abraham Sherry Harris and Beatrice Sherman Harris. He later said a spark for his artistic career was when his first-grade teacher gave him a large sheaf of drawing paper and waxed crayons.

He studied for five years at the Hartford Art School, then a part of the Wadsworth Atheneum, starting at the age of 10. He graduated from Hall High School (Connecticut) in West Hartford, Connecticut.

In 1933, he started college at Trinity College (Connecticut), but dropped out for financial reasons after one year. He returned to the Hartford Art School - which decades later became part of the University of Hartford - as a part-time night student studying drawing, graphic design, and painting.

In 1940, he moved to Kansas City and studied under Thomas Hart Benton (painter) at the Kansas City Art Institute.

He served in the US Army.

== Career ==
He taught at Larson Junior College (now Quinnipiac University). He then earned a combined Bachelors and Masters degree in Fine Arts at Yale University, where he studied with Willem de Kooning, Josef Albers, Stuart Davis, and George Kubler. He later taught at LSU, the Louisville (KY) Art Center, Oswego State Teacher's College in New York, and Southern Illinois University at Carbondale.

He was a professor of art at LSU from 1967 to 1982. From his studio, he produced "hundreds of pieces per year."

In 1945, he won a competition to illustrate a limited edition of Thomas Wolfe’s Look Homeward, Angel: A Story of the Buried Life. However, after Harris completed the drawings, Maxwell Perkins, Wolfe's editor at Scribner's, objected to the Harris drawings and they were not used. Harris later claimed that Perkins wanted drawings in a "prettier style."

In 1956, he was commissioned by the Rockefeller Foundation to design the set and costumes for the Louisville Symphony. That same year, his drawing was exhibited at the MoMA in New York City as part of an exhibit entitled "Recent Drawings U.S.A."

His works "feature abstraction and figurative pieces. His iconic style created dense compositions packed with patterned figures created from dots and quick brushstrokes."

== Personal life ==
In 1944, Harris married Neila Valinchus, a pianist. He moved to his wife's family estate in Pennsylvania in 1945. They had two children, Madeline and Hilary, who were born in Pittston, Pennsylvania.

== Legacy ==
- the unpublished drawings for Wolfe's Look Homeward, Angel were donated in 2004 to the North Carolina Collection in the Wilson Special Collections Library at the University of North Carolina.
- Ann Connelly Fine Art held a retrospective of his work in 2019.

== Selected works ==
=== Paintings and drawings ===
- "Hillary" (multiple works with this same name)
- "The Legend of Sleepy Hollow Illustration"
- "Portrait of a Girl"
- "Self-portrait," 1960
- "Standing Horse," 1966
- "This is a Face II," 1958
- "Paul Bunyon"
- "Babe the Blue Ox"
- "Buzzards from Paul Bunyon"
- "Legend of Sleepy Hollow Illustration (B&W)"
- "Policeman"
- "Dark Nude," 1965
- "Celestian Seer IV," 1972. Held in the collection of the LSU Museum of Art at the Shaw Center for the Arts
- "G.I. Basketball" and "G.I. Boxing," 1943. "Original studies for murals proposed for Fort Dix, New Jersey."

=== Book illustrations ===
- for The City Alphabet Book (circa 1940s)
