= Donald J. Irwin =

American politician

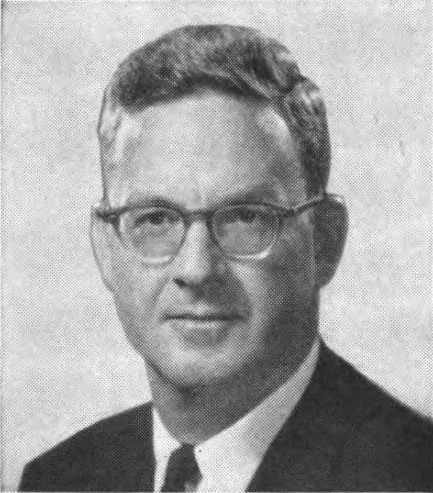

32nd Mayor of Norwalk, Connecticut
- In office 1971–1975
- Preceded by: Frank Zullo
- Succeeded by: Jennie Cave

Member of the U.S. House of Representatives from Connecticut's 4th district
- In office January 3, 1965 – January 3, 1969
- Preceded by: Abner W. Sibal
- Succeeded by: Lowell P. Weicker Jr.
- In office January 3, 1959 – January 3, 1961
- Preceded by: Albert P. Morano
- Succeeded by: Abner W. Sibal

State Treasurer of Connecticut
- In office 1961–1963
- Governor: John N. Dempsey
- Preceded by: John A. Speziale
- Succeeded by: Gerald Lamb

Personal details
- Born: Donald Jay Irwin; September 7, 1926 Rosario, Argentina
- Died: July 7, 2013 (aged 86) East Norwalk, Connecticut
- Resting place: St. John's Cemetery, Norwalk, Connecticut
- Party: Democratic
- Spouse: Mary Stapleton Janet Caldwell Fragale Irwin
- Children: Patrick, Marion, Lucy and Stephen
- Education: Yale University

Donald Jay Irwin (September 7, 1926 – July 7, 2013) was a Democratic member of the U.S. House of Representatives from Connecticut's 4th district, Connecticut State Treasurer and mayor of Norwalk, Connecticut.

== Early life and family ==
He was born to American parents, Montrose Wellington Irwin and Marion Reynolds Irwin in Rosario, Argentina, in 1926. Irwin came to the United States in 1945 to attend Yale College. Soon after enrolling at Yale, he joined the United States Army, where he served with the Joint Brazil-United States Military Commission in Rio de Janeiro. After army service, he returned to Yale and graduated in 1951. He played rugby and soccer at Yale. In addition, he swam for the school team. He taught Spanish at Yale while a student there. He married Mary Stapleton on August 23, 1952. Together they had four children; Patrick (born 1953), Marion, Lucy (born 1959) and Stephen (born 1960). He graduated Yale Law School in 1954. He was admitted to the bar and commenced the practice of law in Connecticut.

== Political career ==
Irwin served as member of the Norwalk Board of Education. He was elected as a Democrat to the Eighty-sixth Congress (January 3, 1959 – January 3, 1961). He was a delegate to Democratic National Convention from Connecticut in 1960. He was an unsuccessful candidate for reelection in 1960 to the Eighty-seventh Congress. He was appointed general counsel, United States Information Agency, 1961. He was appointed treasurer of the State of Connecticut by Gov. John N. Dempsey in 1962. He served from 1961 to 1963 Irwin was elected to the Eighty-ninth and Ninetieth Congresses (January 3, 1965 – January 3, 1969). He was an unsuccessful candidate for reelection in 1968 to the Ninety-first Congress. He then resumed the practice of law. Irwin was elected mayor of Norwalk, Connecticut, in November 1971, defeating Jacob Rudolf. He was reelected in 1973 and was not a candidate for reelection in 1975. Irwin died of heart problems on July 7, 2013, at the age of 86.

== Life after politics ==
After ending his career in politics, Irwin began involving himself in local teaching jobs around Norwalk. He was a permanent substitute teacher at Brien McMahon high school between the years 1995–2000. He also became a grandfather to 11 grandchildren. His first son, Patrick, had two children; Ana and Thomas Irwin. His first daughter, Marion, also had two children; Homer and Mary Turgeon. Lucile gave birth to three children; Ella, Stuart, and Owen Christoph. His youngest, Stephen, had four children; Jay, Matthew, Luke, and Elizabeth Irwin.

== Associations ==
- Member, Knights of Columbus
- Member, Jaycees

U.S. House of Representatives
Preceded by Albert P. Morano	Member of the U.S. House of Representatives from Connecticut's 4th congressional district 1959–1961	Succeeded by Abner W. Sibal
Preceded by Abner W. Sibal	Member of the U.S. House of Representatives from Connecticut's 4th congressional district 1965–1969	Succeeded by Lowell P. Weicker Jr.
Political offices
Preceded by John A. Speziale	State Treasurer of Connecticut; 1961–1963	Succeeded by Gerald A. Lamb
Preceded by Frank Zullo	Mayor of Norwalk, Connecticut; 1971–1975	Succeeded by Jennie Cave
