= Connecticut's 137th House of Representatives district =

American legislative district

Connecticut's 137th State House of Representatives district
Representative
Kadeem Roberts; D–Norwalk

Connecticut's 137th House of Representatives district elects one member of the Connecticut House of Representatives. It is represented by Kadeem Roberts. The district consists of part of the city of Norwalk.

== List of representatives ==
Representative	Party	Years	District home	Note
John D'Onofrio	Democratic	1967 – 1973	Bridgeport	Redistricted to the 127th District
Howard Newman	Republican	1973 – 1975	Norwalk	Redistricted from the 146th District
William Joslynn Lawless, Jr.	Democratic	1975 – 1979	Norwalk	
Andrew Glickson	Democratic	1979 – 1981	Norwalk	defeated by Esposito
Frank J. Esposito	Republican	1981 – 1987	Norwalk	Esposito was elected mayor of Norwalk prompting a special election in February 1988. Sally Bolster defeated Heather Rodin.
Sally Bolster	Republican	1988 – 1993	Norwalk	Bolster's residence was redistricted into a newly formed 141st district with part of Darien. She ran against incumbent Reginald L. Jones, Jr. as a Democrat but was defeated.
Alex Knopp	Democratic	1993 – 2001	Norwalk	Redistricted from the 139th District, Served as mayor of Norwalk (2001)
Bob Duff	Democratic	2001 – 2005	Norwalk	elected to State Senate
Chris Perone	Democratic	2005 – 2022	Norwalk	
Kadeem Roberts	Democratic	2022 – present	Norwalk	

== Recent Election Results ==
=== 2022 ===
2022 Connecticut State House of Representatives election, 137th District
Party	Candidate	Votes	%
Democratic	Kadeem Roberts	3,863	62.61
Republican	Luis G. Estrella	2,147	34.80
Working Families	Kadeem Roberts	160	2.59
Total votes		6,170	100.0

=== 2020 ===
2020 Connecticut State House of Representatives election, District 137
Party	Candidate	Votes	%
Democratic	Chris Perone (incumbent)	7,813	66.61
Republican	Ellen G. Wink	3,619	30.85
Independent Party	Ellen G. Wink	298	2.54
Total votes		11,730	100.00
Democratic hold			

== See also ==
- List of members of the Connecticut General Assembly from Norwalk
