= Albert P. Morano =

American politician

Member of the U.S. House of Representatives from Connecticut's 4th district
- In office January 3, 1951 – January 3, 1959
- Preceded by: John Davis Lodge
- Succeeded by: Donald J. Irwin

Personal details
- Born: Albert Paul Morano; January 18, 1908 Paterson, New Jersey, US
- Died: December 16, 1987 (aged 79) Greenwich, Connecticut, US
- Resting place: St Mary's Cemetery; Greenwich, Connecticut
- Party: Republican
- Occupation: real estate, insurance

Albert Paul Morano (January 18, 1908 – December 16, 1987) was an American politician and member of the U.S. House of Representatives from Connecticut.

== Life and career ==
Born in Paterson, New Jersey to Italian settlers, Morano moved to Greenwich, Connecticut in 1912 and attended the public schools there. He served as member of Greenwich Board of Tax Review 1933-1935, and as chairman of the Chickahominy (area within Greenwich) Town Meeting District 1935-1937. He was Secretary to Representative Albert E. Austin in 1939 and 1940. He engaged in the real estate and insurance business in Greenwich, Connecticut in 1942. He then served as Secretary to Representative Clare Boothe Luce 1943-1947, and State unemployment benefits commissioner 1947-1950, serving as chairman of the commission in 1949 and 1950.

Morano was elected as a Republican to the Eighty-second and to the three succeeding Congresses (January 3, 1951 – January 3, 1959). Morano voted in favor of the Civil Rights Act of 1957. He was an unsuccessful candidate for reelection in 1958. He served as special assistant to United States Senator Thomas J. Dodd from 1963 to 1969. He was a resident of Greenwich, Connecticut, until his death there on December 16, 1987. He was interred in Saint Mary's Cemetery.

U.S. House of Representatives
Preceded by John Davis Lodge	Member of the U.S. House of Representatives from Connecticut's 4th congressional district 1951-1959	Succeeded by Donald J. Irwin
