= Donnie Sellers =

American politician (born 1944)

Donnie R. Sellers, Sr.

Member of the Connecticut House of Representatives from the 140th district
- In office 1993–1997
- Preceded by: Douglas Mintz
- Succeeded by: Joseph Clemmons

Personal details
- Born: November 20, 1944 (age 81) Norwalk, Connecticut, U.S.
- Party: Democratic; A Connecticut Party
- Children: Earl
- Education: Norwalk Community College (Associate 1973); University of New Haven (Associate 1975); University of New Haven (B.A. in political science, 1975)
- Occupation: Police officer

Donnie R. Sellers Sr. (born November 20, 1944) is a former Democratic member of the Connecticut House of Representatives from Norwalk, Connecticut's 140th assembly district. He resigned his seat in February 1997. He was concurrently serving on the Norwalk Common Council and was an active policeman as well.

== Early life ==
Sellers was born on November 20, 1944, in Norwalk, Connecticut. He is a graduate of the University of New Haven, with a B.S. in political science. He joined the Norwalk Police Department in 1966. He is a member of the United States Army Reserves since 1972.

== Political career ==
In 1989, he was the first petition candidate to win his district and the first police officer to serve on the Norwalk Common Council.

In January 1993, he won election to the Connecticut House in a special election beating Republican Eleni Sotiriou by a 2-to-1 margin while running with the endorsements of the Democratic Party and A Connecticut Party. The special election was called when Representative Doug Mintz resigned to become a Superior Court judge.

He was re-elected to the Connecticut House on Nov. 8, 1994, having beaten Republican challenger, Fabian Vega.

Sellers left office in 1997 after pleading guilty to receiving a $200 bribe to write a letter of recommendation for a gun permit. In 1998, he attempted to regain his seat, but due to mistakes in the filing of petitions was unable to force a primary challenge. He also tried to regain a seat on the Norwalk Common Council, but was again unable to, due to mistakes in the filing of petitions. He was successfully able to force a primary in 2002, but was defeated in a three-way race by Joseph Mann.

== Associations ==
- Fair Housing Rent Commissioner
- Neighborhood Housing Services
- NEON Christian Community Action Group
- Board of Directors, George Washington Carver
- Commissioner, Boy Scouts of America

Preceded by Douglas Mintz	Member of the Connecticut House of Representatives from the 140th District; 1993 – 1997	Succeeded by Joseph Clemmons
