= Scott Slifka =

American politician

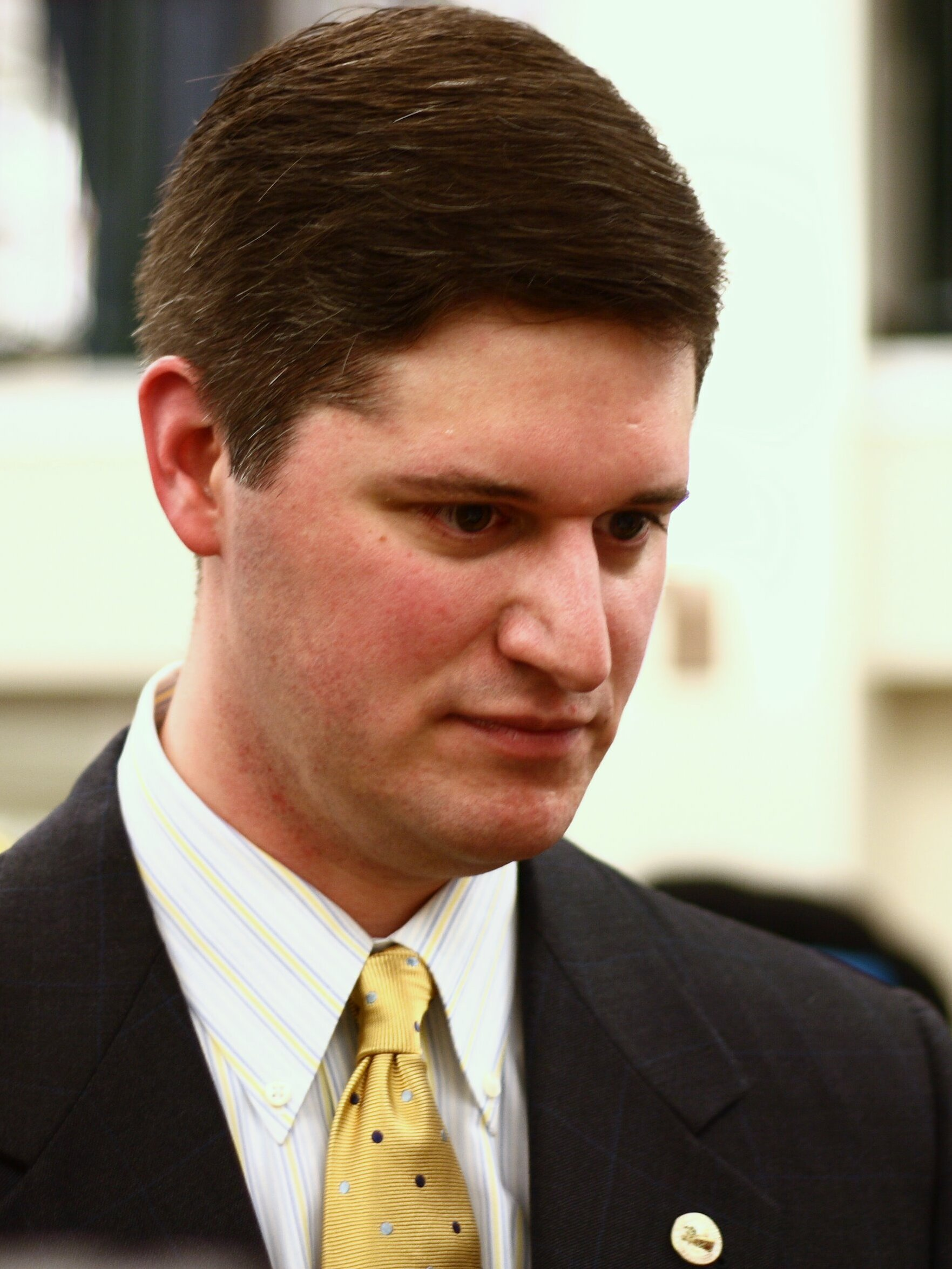

Mayor of West Hartford
- In office 2004 – May 16, 2016
- Deputy: Shari Cantor
- Preceded by: Jonathan Harris
- Succeeded by: Shari Cantor

West Hartford Town Councilor
- In office 2001 – May 16, 2016

Personal details
- Born: March 5, 1974 (age 52) Chicago, Illinois
- Party: Democratic
- Spouse: Noelle Simpson Slifka
- Children: Betsy Slifka

Scott Slifka (born Robert Scott Slifka; March 5, 1974 in Chicago, Illinois) is an American politician and the former mayor of West Hartford, Connecticut. A Democrat, Slifka was first elected to the West Hartford Town Council in 2001. He served as mayor from 2004 to 2016.

Slifka was raised in West Hartford and attended George Washington University and the George Washington University Law School. He served as chief-of-staff for Connecticut Secretary of State Susan Bysiewicz. In 2006 he ran unsuccessfully for Lieutenant Governor of Connecticut on a ticket with John DeStefano, Jr., losing in the Democratic primary.

He oversaw the approval and completion of the Blue Back Square project and a new hotel in town.

On Jan. 28, 2016, Slifka announced his intention to step down as Mayor later the same year after being named Deputy General Counsel of The LEGO Group.
