= Frank Esposito (politician) =

American politician (1928–2013)

Frank J. Esposito

Member of the Connecticut House of Representatives from the 137th district
- In office 1981–1987
- Preceded by: Andrew Glickson
- Succeeded by: Sally Bolster

37th Mayor of Norwalk, Connecticut
- In office 1987–2001
- Preceded by: William A. Collins
- Succeeded by: Alex Knopp

Personal details
- Born: March 24, 1928 Bronx, New York, U.S.
- Died: January 9, 2013 (aged 84) Norwalk, Connecticut, U.S.
- Resting place: St. John's Cemetery, Norwalk, Connecticut, U.S.
- Party: Republican
- Spouse: Louise Stroffolino
- Children: Frank L. Esposito, Peggy Belline

Military service
- Branch/service: U.S. Army
- Rank: Sgt. 1st class
- Battles/wars: Korean War

Frank J. Esposito (March 24, 1928 – January 9, 2013) was the mayor of Norwalk, Connecticut for seven terms, from 1987 to 2001, the longest-serving mayor in the city's history. He also served four terms from 1981 to 1987 in the Connecticut House of Representatives, including as Assistant Majority Leader and Minority Leader.

== Early life and family ==
He was born in Bronx, New York, the fourth of five children of Frank R. Esposito and Mary Zecola Esposito. At the age of 12, he moved to Norwalk with his family and graduated from Norwalk High School in 1946 where he was an accomplished football player. He was married to Louise Stroffolino, the niece of State Senator Stanley Stroffolino, on January 27, 1951.

Esposito served in the U.S. Army during the Korean War as a sergeant 1st class. After being discharged, he learned about radio and television engineering at the RCA Institute in New York. He worked for a time at the DuMont Television Network, and was the owner of a grocery store and delicatessen in Norwalk for over 25 years.

== Political career ==
Esposito began his political career in 1970, as an appointed member of the Norwalk Housing Authority. He then was elected to two terms on Norwalk's Common Council. He served four terms from 1981 to 1987 in the Connecticut House of Representatives, representing Connecticut's 137th assembly district, including as Assistant Majority Leader and Minority Leader. In 1987, Esposito resigned from the legislature to run for mayor of Norwalk.

=== Mayoral administration ===
Esposito's seven terms from 1987 to 2001 was the longest mayoral administration in the city's history. His accomplishments as mayor included building a parking garage for rail commuters, raising the city's bond rating to the top AAA, leading the effort for a $50 million upgrade to Norwalk's sewage treatment plant, moving the Department of Public Work's garage from Matthews Park to make room for a children's museum and playground, designating a new site for the Norwalk Police Department, closing the conspicuously visible city dump, and supporting the creation of The Maritime Aquarium at a time when it wasn't that popular.

== Death ==
He died on January 9, 2013, of cancer, and he was buried at St. John's Cemetery in Norwalk.

Preceded by Andrew Glickson	Connecticut House of Representatives; 137th Assembly District; 1981–1987	Succeeded by Sally Bolster
Preceded by William A. Collins	Mayor of Norwalk, Connecticut; 1987–2001	Succeeded by Alex Knopp
