= Chris Perone =

American politician

Christopher Perone

Member of the Connecticut House of Representatives from the 137th district
- In office 2005–2022
- Preceded by: Bob Duff
- Succeeded by: Kadeem Roberts

Personal details
- Born: Bedford, New York, U.S.
- Party: Democratic
- Spouse: Christy
- Education: Syracuse University
- Website: www.chrisperone.com

Christopher R. Perone is a five-term Democratic member of the Connecticut House of Representatives, representing the 137th District since 2005. He previously served as a member of the Norwalk Common Council from 2001 to 2003. He is a graduate of Syracuse University with a degree in advertising.

== Early life and family ==
Perone was born in Bedford, New York and attended Fox Lane High School.

== Political career ==
Perone was elected to the Norwalk Common Council from District D. He has served on the board of the Southwestern Regional Planning Association, (S.W.R.P.A.) and on the committees of several groups including the Norwalk Education Foundation, the Lockwood Matthew’s Mansion restoration committee and the Norwalk Land Trust.

Perone was elected to Connecticut House of Representatives representing the 137th District in 2004. He has been re-elected 2006, 2008, 2010, and 2012. In 2012, he defeated Republican challenger Joanne T. Romano in the race for the 137th District seat.

Perone is current the chair of the Commerce Committee.

Preceded by Bob Duff	Connecticut House of Representatives; 137th Assembly District; 2005-2015	Succeeded by incumbent
