= Sally Bolster =

American politician (died 2013)

Member of the Connecticut House of Representatives from the 137th district
- In office 1988–1993
- Preceded by: Frank Esposito
- Succeeded by: Alex Knopp

Personal details
- Born: 1928 or 1929 Hartford, Connecticut, U.S.
- Died: August 16, 2013 (aged 84) San Antonio, Texas, U.S.
- Party: Republican; Democratic

Sally McCarthy Bolster (died August 16, 2013) was a former member of the Connecticut House of Representatives, representing the 137th district from 1988 to 1993. She served on the Norwalk Common Council, including as its president. She had previously been an aide to U.S. Representative Stewart McKinney.

== Political career ==
In 1974, Bolster was a candidate for Secretary of the State of Connecticut.

In 1988, Bolster defeated Democratic challenger Heather Rodin in a special election to fill the Connecticut House seat vacated by Frank Esposito.

In 1990, Bolster defeated Democratic challenger Herbert Feuerhake.

In 1992, Bolster's residence was redistricted into a newly formed 141st district with part of Darien. She ran against incumbent Reginald L. Jones Jr. as a Democrat but was defeated.

== Death ==
Bolster died on August 16, 2013, in San Antonio, Texas. She was 84.

Party political offices
Preceded by Barbara Dunn	Republican nominee for Secretary of the State of Connecticut; 1974	Succeeded by Louise Berry
Preceded by Frank Esposito	Connecticut House of Representatives; 137th Assembly District; 1988–1993	Succeeded by Alex Knopp
