= Bob Duff =

American politician (born 1971)

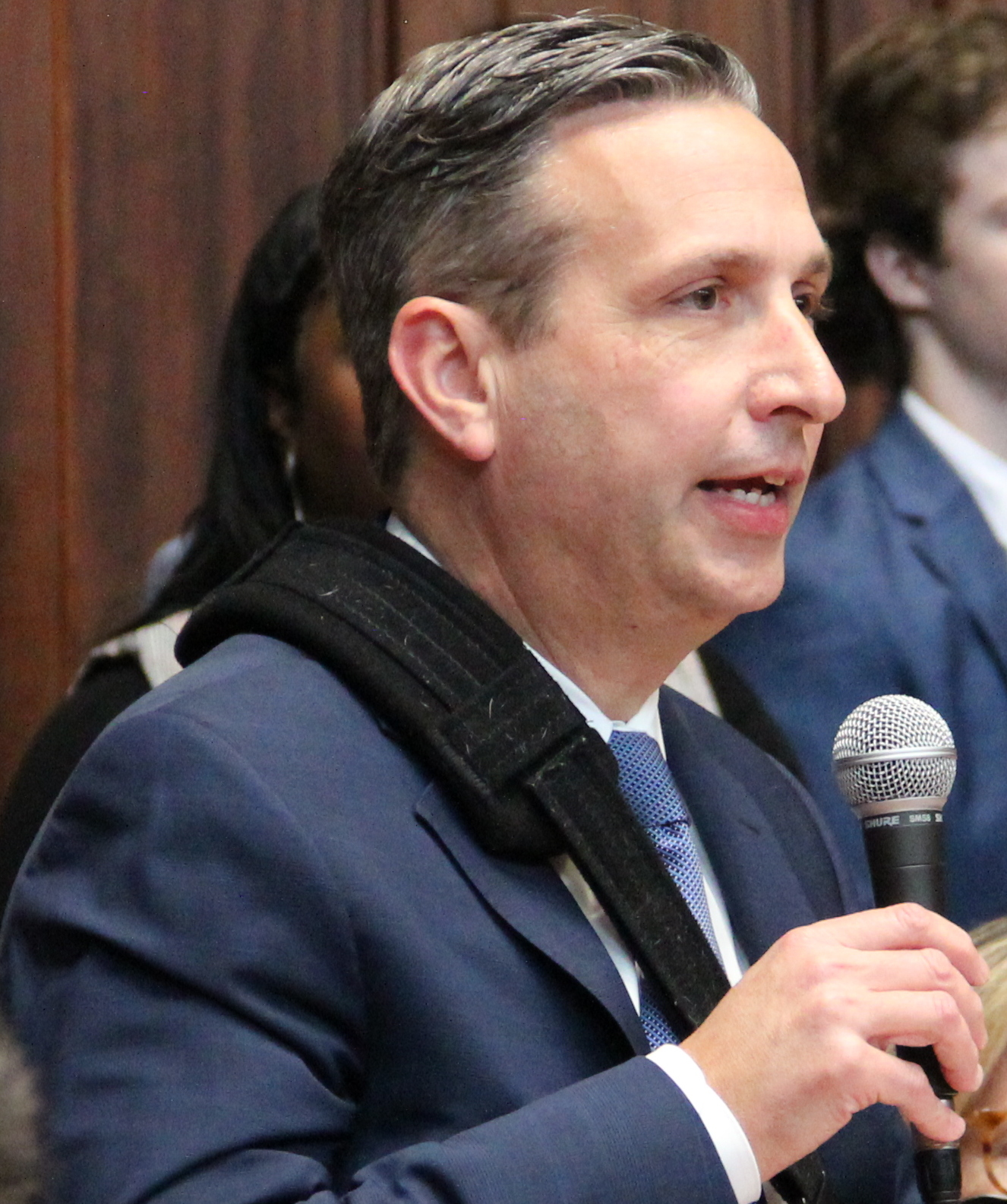
- Duff in 2023

Majority Leader of the Connecticut State Senate
- Incumbent
- Assumed office January 7, 2015
- Preceded by: Martin Looney

Member of the Connecticut State Senate from the 25th district
- Incumbent
- Assumed office January 7, 2005
- Preceded by: Robert Genuario

Member of the Connecticut House of Representatives from the 137th district
- In office January 30, 2002 – January 7, 2005
- Preceded by: Alex Knopp
- Succeeded by: Chris Perone

Personal details
- Born: Robert Bruce Duff; 8 May 1971 (age 55) Norwalk, Connecticut, U.S.
- Party: Democratic
- Spouse: Tracey Krause
- Children: 2
- Education: Lynchburg College (BA)
- Website: Official website

Robert Bruce Duff (born May 8, 1971) is an American politician, currently serving as a member of the Connecticut State Senate, where he represents Norwalk and part of Darien in Connecticut's 25th District. He previously served as a member of the Connecticut House of Representatives, representing the 137th District. He is currently Majority Leader of the Connecticut Senate, and serves as chair of the Executive and Legislative Nominations Committee and vice chair of the Legislative Management Committee.

== Early life and education ==
Duff was born in Norwalk, Connecticut to Bruce and Joanne Duff. He is a fifth-generation resident of Norwalk, Connecticut, however his ancestors were originally settled in Greenwich, Connecticut, hailing from England.

Duff graduated from Norwalk High School in 1989. He attended Lynchburg College, and earned a Bachelor of Science in Political Science in 1993. He worked as a substitute teacher for the Norwalk Public Schools from 1993 to 1995. While in college, Duff was a student senator, and an intern for United States Senator Chris Dodd.

== Career ==
He was a field coordinator for the John B. Larson for Governor Campaign in 1994. He was a campaign manager in the Norwalk mayoral race in 1995. As serving in the Connecticut General Assembly is a part-time position, most members have full-time jobs. Duff has worked as a realtor for William Pitt Sotheby's International Realty since 1995.

In 2001, he ran in a special election for the seat in the Connecticut House of Representatives left vacant by Alex Knopp when he took office as mayor of Norwalk. He beat Republican Kevin Fitzgerald by 281 votes (1210 -929). He was re-elected in the 2002 general election. As a state Representative, Duff served as the House vice-chair of the Energy & Technology Committee, and as a member of the Banks, Higher Education & Advancement Committee and the Select Committee on Housing.

In 2004, Duff sought the State Senate seat left open by Republican Robert Genuario who became Gov. M. Jodi Rell's budget chief. He ran against Republican Jeff Konspore, chairman of the Norwalk school board.

As a state senator, and prior to becoming Majority Leader in 2015, Duff was Deputy Majority Whip from 2005 to 2006, Majority Whip from 2007 to 2008, Assistant Majority Leader from 2009 to 2012, and Assistant President Pro Tempore from 2013 to 2014.

== Private ==
Duff is married to Tracey Kathleen (née Krause). They have two children and reside in the Cranbury section of Norwalk, Connecticut.

== Awards ==
- Legislator of the Year, YMCA of Connecticut, 2003
- Legislator of the Year Award, National Association of Social Workers, Connecticut Chapter, 2005
- Rick Wallace Award of Merit Legislator of the Year Award, Connecticut Association of Not-for-profit Providers for the Aging.

Connecticut House of Representatives
Preceded by Alex Knopp	Member of the Connecticut House of Representatives from the 137th district 2001–2005	Succeeded by Chris Perone
Connecticut State Senate
Preceded by Robert Genuario	Member of the Connecticut Senate from the 25th district 2005–present	Incumbent
Preceded by Martin Looney	Majority Leader of the Connecticut Senate; 2015–present	Incumbent
