= John Atkin =

American politician

Member of the Connecticut Senate from the 25th District
- In office January 7, 1987 – January 9, 1991
- Preceded by: Joseph Santo
- Succeeded by: Robert Genuario

Member of the Connecticut House of Representatives from the 140th District
- In office 1979–1985
- Preceded by: Thomas C. O'Connor
- Succeeded by: Janet M. Mills

Personal details
- Party: Democratic
- Spouse: Colleen

John Atkin is a former two term Democratic member of the Connecticut Senate from Norwalk, Connecticut's 25th Senate district and a former three term member of the Connecticut House of Representatives from Norwalk, Connecticut's 140th House district.

== Early life and family ==
Son of William Wilson Atkin, a book publisher.

== Political career ==
In 1982, Atkin was challenged for his seat in the Connecticut House by Janet Mills, but was re-elected.

Atkin was defeated for re-election to the Connecticut House by Janet Mills in 1984.

In March 1986, State Senator Andrew Santaniello of the 25th district died unexpectedly, creating a vacancy. Atkin ran for the special election to fill it, but lost to Republican Joseph Santo on May 6, 1986. However, in the general election on November 4, 1986, Atkin defeated Santo that same year, becoming a State Senator.

In 1988, he faced a challenge from Republican Michael Lyons, Norwalk Common Council member for the senate seat, but Atkin was re-elected.

Atkin was defeated for re-election to the Connecticut Senate by Robert Genuario in 1990.

Preceded by Thomas C. O'Connor	Member of the Connecticut House of Representatives from the 140th District; 1979 – 1985	Succeeded by Janet M. Mills
Preceded by Andrew Santaniello	Member of the Connecticut Senate from the 25th District; 1987 – 1991	Succeeded by Robert Genuario
