= Douglas Mintz =

American politician (born 1952)

Douglas C. Mintz

Member of the Connecticut House of Representatives from the 140th District
- In office 1986–1992
- Preceded by: Janet M. Mills
- Succeeded by: Donnie Sellers

Personal details
- Born: 1952 (age 73–74)
- Party: Democratic; A Connecticut Party
- Spouse: Elaine Velleca Mintz
- Education: University of Michigan (BGS); Western New England College (JD)
- Occupation: Lawyer

Douglas C. Mintz (born 1952) is a judge on the Stamford/Norwalk District Superior Court in Connecticut. He is a former Democratic member of the Connecticut House of Representatives from Norwalk, Connecticut's 140th House district. He resigned his seat to become a judge, causing a vacancy and a special election was held to fill it in February 1993. Mintz is now a partner at leading Connecticut law firm, Carmody Torrance Sandak & Hennessey LLP.

== Early life and family ==
He is the son of Lewis and Lea Mintz. He graduated from the University of Michigan with a Bachelor of General Studies and from Western New England College with a Juris Doctor He was admitted to the bar in 1978. In 1991, while serving in the Connecticut House, he met and married, the former Democratic clerk in the appropriations committee, Elaine Velleca.

== Political career ==
Mintz was chair of the Norwalk Conservation Commission.

He defeated incumbent Republican Janet M. Mills in 1986.

In 1992, he was selected by Governor Lowell P. Weicker Jr. to become a superior court judge. A special election was called to fill the vacancy.

Preceded by Janet M. Mills	Member of the Connecticut House of Representatives from the 140th District; 1986 – 1992	Succeeded by Donnie Sellers
