= Connecticut's 140th House of Representatives district =

American legislative district

Connecticut's 140th State House of Representatives district
Representative
Travis Simms; D–Norwalk
- Demographics: <45.4% White; 27.2% Black; 27.4% Hispanic

Connecticut's 140th House of Representatives district elects one member of the Connecticut House of Representatives. It is currently represented by Travis Simms. The district consists of the central part of the city of Norwalk.

== List of representatives ==
Prior to redistricting in 1972, Otha Brown Jr. represented the 148th District and John Fabrizio represented the 147th. The redistricting formed the 140th from the old 148th, 147th and part of the 145th District. This forced a contest between the two incumbents. Brown was defeated by Fabrizio in the November 1972 election.

Representative	Party	Years	District home	Note
Melville A. Burrows	Republican	1967–1968	Fairfield	Resigned in 1968
Roy Henry Ervin	Republican	1969–1973	Fairfield	
John Fabrizio	Republican	1973–1975	Norwalk	Redistricted from the 147th
William A. Collins	Democratic	1975–1977	Norwalk	Served as mayor of Norwalk
Thomas C. O'Connor	Republican	1977–1981	Norwalk	Served as mayor of Norwalk
John Atkin	Democratic	1981–1985	Norwalk	Defeated in general election
Janet M. Mills	Republican	1985–1987	Norwalk	Defeated in general election
Douglas Mintz	Democratic	1987–1992	Norwalk	Appointed Superior Court judge
Donnie Sellers	Democratic	1993–1997	Norwalk	Resigned due to conviction of bribery
Joseph Clemmons	Democratic	1997–2003	Norwalk	
Joseph Mann	Democratic	2003–2007	Norwalk	
Bruce Morris	Democratic	2007–2019	Norwalk	Retired
Travis Simms	Democratic	2019–	Norwalk	

== Recent elections ==
=== 2002 ===
State Election 2002: House District 140
Party	Candidate	Votes	%	±%
Democratic	Joseph Mann	1819		
Republican	Richard A. McQuaid	1102		
Independent	Donnie Sellers			

=== 2004 ===
State Election 2004: House District 140
Party	Candidate	Votes	%	±%
Democratic	Joseph Mann			

=== 2006 ===
State Election 2006: House District 140
Party	Candidate	Votes	%	±%
Democratic	Bruce Morris	2,385		
Republican	Richard A. McQuaid	934		
Independent	Myrtice Riley-Wilson	39		

=== 2008 ===
State Election 2008: House District 140
Party	Candidate	Votes	%	±%
Democratic	Bruce Morris	5,147		
Working Families	Bruce Morris	493		
Republican	No candidate			

=== 2010 ===
State Election 2010: House District 140
Party	Candidate	Votes	%	±%
Democratic	Bruce Morris	2,997		
Working Families	Bruce Morris	281		
Republican	No candidate			

=== 2012 ===
State Election 2012: House District 140
Party	Candidate	Votes	%	±%
Democratic	Bruce Morris	5,327		
Republican	No candidate			

=== 2020 ===
2020 Connecticut State House of Representatives election, District 140
Party	Candidate	Votes	%
Democratic	Travis Simms (incumbent)	5,861	78.11
Republican	John J. Flynn	1,643	21.89
Total votes		7,504	100.00
Democratic hold			

=== 2022 ===
2022 Connecticut State House of Representatives election, 140th District
Party	Candidate	Votes	%
Democratic	Travis Simms (incumbent)	3,061	100.00
Total votes		3,061	100.00

== See also ==
- List of members of the Connecticut General Assembly from Norwalk
