= Louis Ciccarello =

American politician (1938–2023)

Member of the Connecticut Senate from the 25th district
- In office 1975–1977
- Preceded by: William J. Lyons Jr.
- Succeeded by: Alfred Santaniello Jr.

Personal details
- Born: October 26, 1938
- Died: September 9, 2023 (aged 94)
- Party: Democratic
- Children: 2

Louis S. Ciccarello (October 26, 1938 – September 9, 2023) was an American politician and lawyer.

Ciccarello was elected to a single term on the Connecticut Senate in 1974, representing the 25th district as a Democrat. He earned a J.D. degree from Stanford University Law School, then practiced law from 1965 to 2018. Ciccarello had a daughter, Lynne, and a son, Matthew. Matthew died in 2012 at the age of 43.
