= Kevin Sullivan (politician) =

American politician (born 1949)

Kevin B. Sullivan
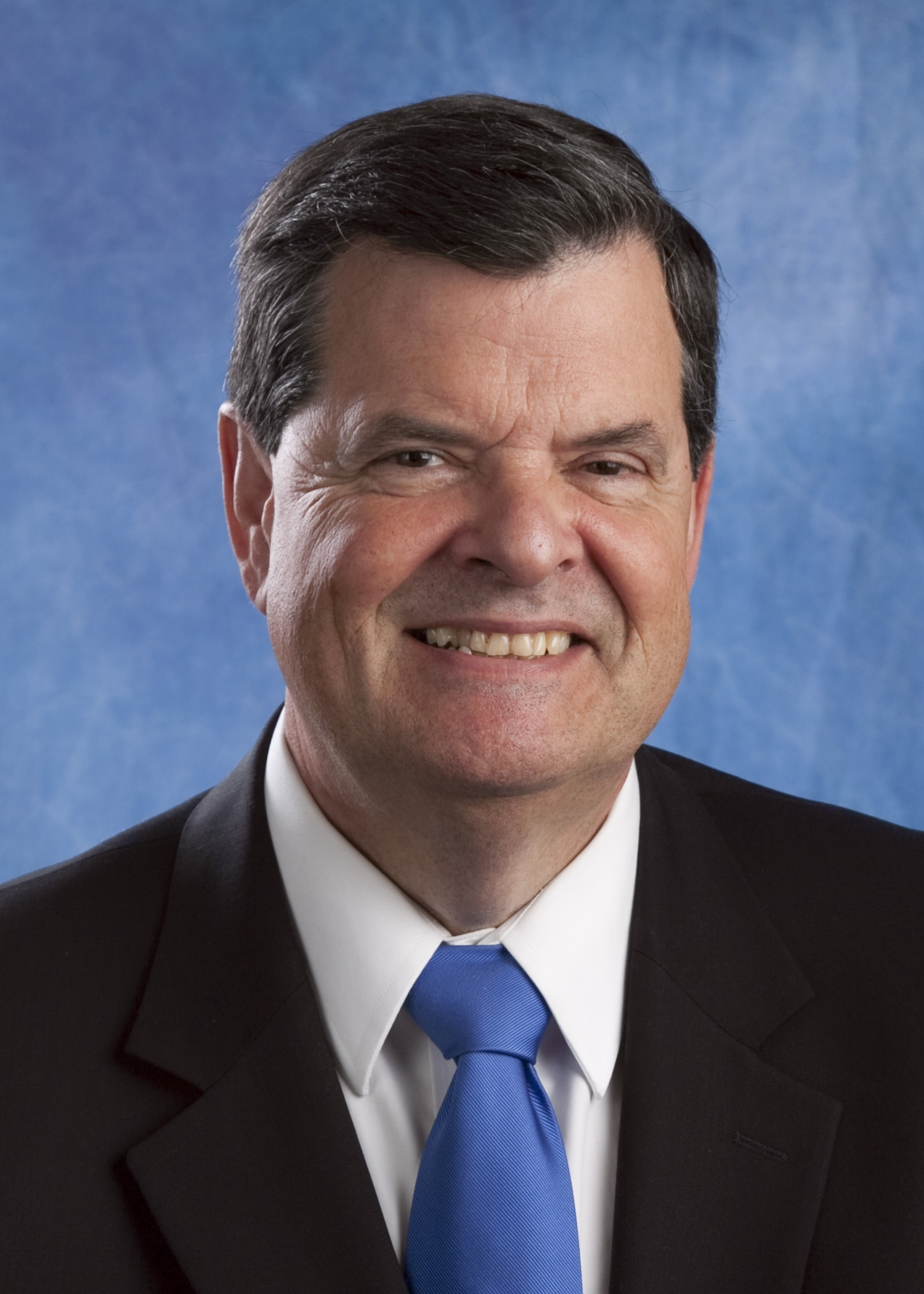

106th Lieutenant Governor of Connecticut
- In office July 1, 2004 – January 3, 2007
- Governor: Jodi Rell
- Preceded by: Jodi Rell
- Succeeded by: Michael Fedele

President pro tempore of the Connecticut State Senate
- In office January 8, 1997 – July 1, 2004
- Preceded by: M. Adela Eads
- Succeeded by: Donald E. Williams Jr.

Member of the Connecticut State Senate from the 5th district
- In office January 7, 1987 – July 1, 2004
- Preceded by: Anne Streeter
- Succeeded by: Jonathan Harris

Personal details
- Born: August 20, 1949 (age 77)
- Party: Democratic
- Spouse: Dr. Carolyn Thornberry
- Education: Trinity College; University of Connecticut School of Law
- Profession: Attorney

Kevin B. Sullivan (born August 20, 1949) is an American politician. A Democrat, he was the 106th Lieutenant Governor of Connecticut, from 2004 to 2007. He was elected to the Connecticut State Senate in 1986 and served as Senate President Pro Tempore from 1997 to 2004. He was a 2024 presidential elector, pledged to cast his vote for Kamala Harris.

== Mayor ==
Prior to his election to the State Senate, he was mayor of West Hartford, Connecticut, serving on the Town Council for five years. As Mayor, he oversaw an executive reorganization of town government, land use changes that eventually led to the economic renewal of the town center and cut property taxes.

== State senator ==
Elected to the State Senate in 1986, Sullivan chaired the General Assembly's Education Committee. Connecticut Magazine cited him for his honesty and hard work. After serving as Assistant Minority Leader, Sullivan became State Senate President Pro Tempore in 1997 and chaired the national Senate President's Forum.

== Lieutenant governor ==
Upon Governor John G. Rowland's resignation and imprisonment, Lieutenant Governor M. Jodi Rell became governor. Sullivan, as the Senate President Pro Tempore, succeeded to the office of Lieutenant Governor in 2004 where he served until 2007. During his time as Lieutenant governor, he led a statewide effort to improve mental health care.

== Commissioner of Revenue Services ==
In 2011, Governor Dannel Malloy appointed Sullivan as Connecticut's Commissioner of Revenue Service. He also served as President of the national Federation of Tax Administrators.

Political offices
Preceded by Jodi Rell	Lieutenant Governor of Connecticut; 2004 - 2007	Succeeded by Michael Fedele
