= Connecticut's 139th House of Representatives district =

American legislative district

Connecticut's 139th State House of Representatives district
Representative
| Larry Pemberton; D–Montville |

Connecticut's 139th House of Representatives district elects one member of the Connecticut House of Representatives. Its current representative is Larry Pemberton of Montville. Prior to the 1992 redistricting, the 139th district was in Norwalk.

== List of representatives ==
List of Representatives from Connecticut's 139th State House District
| Representative | Party | Years | District home | Note |
|---|---|---|---|---|
| Agnes Simons | Democratic | 1967–1973 | Bridgeport | Seat created |
| Louis Padula | Republican | 1973–1975 | Norwalk | |
| John F. McGuirk | Democratic | 1975–1977 | Norwalk | |
| Edward Zamm | Republican | 1977–1979 | Norwalk | |
| John F. McGuirk | Democratic | 1979–1981 | Norwalk | |
| Jacob Rudolf | Republican | 1981–1987 | Norwalk | |
| Alex Knopp | Democratic | 1987–1993 | Norwalk | Redistricted to the 137th District |
| Kevin Ryan | Democratic | 1993–2025 | Montville | Died in office |
| Larry Pemberton | Democratic | 2026– | Montville | |

== See also ==
- List of members of the Connecticut General Assembly from Norwalk
