= Mary Ann Handley =

American politician (1936–2023)

Member of the Connecticut Senate from the 4th district
- In office 1997–2011
- Preceded by: Paul Munns
- Succeeded by: Steve Cassano
- Constituency: represented Bolton, Glastonbury, Manchester, and Marlborough

Personal details
- Born: May 13, 1936 Manchester, Connecticut, U.S.
- Died: December 9, 2023 (aged 87)
- Party: Democratic
- Education: Connecticut College (BA); University of Connecticut (MA)

Mary Ann Handley (May 13, 1936 – December 9, 2023) was an American politician. Handley, a Democrat, served as a member of the Connecticut State Senate from 1997 until her retirement in 2010. She was Chief Deputy Majority Leader, as well as a member of the Appropriations, Commerce, Higher Education and Employment Advancement, and Judiciary Committees.

A resident of Manchester, she represented Bolton, Glastonbury, Manchester, and Marlborough in the Connecticut Senate. Before being elected to the senate, Handley served as deputy mayor of Manchester (1991–1996) and as a member of the Manchester Board of Directors (1987–1989, 1991–1996). Handley also was a college professor from 1967 to 1997.

Handley was born and raised in Manchester. She held a Bachelor of Arts from Connecticut College and a Master of Arts from the University of Connecticut.

Handley died on December 9, 2023, at the age of 87.

== See also ==
- Connecticut Senate

Preceded by Paul Munns	Connecticut Senator from the Fourth District; 1997–2010	Succeeded by Stephen T. Cassano
