= Michael Meotti =

American politician

Executive Director of the Washington Student Achievement Council
- Incumbent
- Assumed office December 2016

Vice President of the Connecticut Board of Regents for Higher Education
- In office September 2011 – October 2012

Interim President of the Connecticut Board of Regents for Higher Education
- In office July 1, 2011 – September 11, 2011
- Preceded by: Louise H. Feroe
- Succeeded by: Robert A. Kennedy

Member of the Connecticut State Senate
- In office January 1987 – January 1995

Personal details
- Education: Georgetown University

Michael Meotti is an American politician. He is the executive director of the Washington Student Achievement Council. Meotti was a member of the Connecticut State Senate, Interim President of the Connecticut Board of Regents for Higher Education, and Vice President of the Connecticut Board of Regents for Higher Education.

== Biography ==
Meotti has bachelor's and law degrees from Georgetown University. Meotti was first elected to the Connecticut Senate in the 1986 election and he did not run for Connecticut Senate after he won the 1992 election. In July 2011, Meotti was appointed interim president of the Connecticut Board of Regents for Higher Education.

Robert Kennedy replaced Meotti as interim president in August 2011. Meotti became the Vice President of the Connecticut Board of Regents for Higher Education in September 2011. In October 2012, Meotti resigned from the vice presidency of the Connecticut Board of Regents for Higher Education after a scandal regarding him approving pay raises for 21 officials that were in violation of Connecticut law.

The Connecticut comptroller's office didn't count his time in the State Senate towards a pension because his time between state service positions was too long, which led Meotti to be 5 months short of the time needed to get a lifelong pension. In December 2016, Meotti was appointed as the executive director of the Washington Student Achievement Council.

== See also ==
- List of Connecticut State University System executives
