= Connecticut's 25th State Senate district =

American legislative district

Senator
Bob Duff; D

Connecticut's 25th State Senate district elects one member of the Connecticut State Senate. The district consists of all of Norwalk and part of Darien. Its current senator is Democrat Bob Duff.

== List of senators ==
Prior to 1905, the area in the 25th district was represented by the 12th district.

Senator	Party	Years	District home	Note
Stiles Judson	Republican	1905–1909	Stratford	Served as President Pro Tempore of the Senate
Daniel Brinsmade	Republican	1909–1911	Shelton	
Stiles Judson	Republican	1911–1913	Stratford	
John Hoyt Perry	Republican	1913–1915	Southport	
Frederick M. Salmon	Republican	1915–1919	Westport	
John B. Dillon	Republican	1919–1921	Shelton	
Elmore Banks	Republican	1921–1923	Fairfield	
Charles E. Wheeler	Republican	1927–1929	Stratford	
Albert E. Lavery	Republican	1929–1933	Fairfield	Served as President Pro Tempore
...				
Charles E. Wheeler	Republican	1939–1940	Stratford	
...				
William E. Sheehy	Republican	1945–1947	Shelton	
...				
Jacob Rudolf	Republican	1967–1973	Norwalk	
William J. Lyons Jr.	Republican	1973–1975	Norwalk	
Louis Ciccarello	Democratic	1975–1977	Norwalk	
Alfred Santaniello Jr.	Republican	1977–1983	Norwalk	ran for judge
Andrew J. Santaniello Jr.	Republican	1983–1986	Norwalk	died in office, causing a special election
Joseph Santo	Republican	1986–1987	Norwalk	lost to Atkin in general election in November
John Atkin	Democratic	1987–1991	Norwalk	
Robert Genuario	Republican	1991–2005	Norwalk	
Bob Duff	Democratic	2005–present	Norwalk	
