= Kevin Ryan (politician) =

American politician (1952–2025)

Member of the Connecticut House of Representatives from the 139th district
- In office January 3, 1993 – November 23, 2025
- Preceded by: Alex Knopp
- Succeeded by: Larry Pemberton

Personal details
- Born: August 1, 1952 Fitchburg, Massachusetts, U.S.
- Died: November 23, 2025 (aged 73) West Hartford, Connecticut, U.S.
- Party: Democratic
- Education: Villanova University (B.A., B.S.); University of New Haven (M.A.); Pennsylvania College of Optometry (B.S., O.D.)

Kevin Ryan (August 1, 1952 – November 23, 2025) was an American politician who served as a member of the Connecticut House of Representatives from 1993 until his death in 2025. A Democrat, Ryan represented the 139th district.

== Early life ==
Ryan was born on August 1, 1952, in Fitchburg, Massachusetts. He attended Villanova University, earned a master's degree from the University of New Haven, and earned a doctorate degree from the Pennsylvania College of Optometry.

== Career ==
Prior to his political career, Ryan taught physics at the University of New Haven as an adjunct professor. He also was a justice of the peace and served on the Montville Board of Education.

Ryan was first elected in 1992 to represent Ledyard, Norwich, and Montville of the 139th Connecticut House of Representatives district. Ryan was last elected in 2024, after defeating Republican Mark Adams by over 1000 votes. Ryan served on the House Appropriations Committee, Public Health Committee, and Environment Committee. He also chaired the House Labor Committee for eight years.

In 2024, Ryan served as the chair of the Council of State Governments.

== Personal life and death ==
Ryan was arrested three times for driving under the influence; upon his third conviction in 2001, he served 120 days in prison while the state legislature was in recess.

Ryan died on November 23, 2025, at the age of 73. At the time, he had been in hospice care after being treated for cancer. Several state politicians expressed their condolences regarding his death. Connecticut governor Ned Lamont ordered state flags to be flown at half-staff in honor of Ryan.
