= Richard D. Veltri =

American educator and politician (1936–2015)

Richard D. Veltri (November 12, 1936 – January 4, 2015) was an American educator and politician.

== Biography ==
Born on November 12, 1936, in Huntington, New York, Veltri received his bachelor's and master's degree from Rensselaer Polytechnic Institute and his doctorate degree in mechanical engineering from University of Connecticut. He then worked for United Technologies Research Center. He served on the East Hartford, Connecticut Town Board and was a Republican. Veltri served in the Connecticut House of Representatives from 1994 to 1998. He died on January 4, 2015, aged 78.
