= Jacob Rudolf =

American politician (1926–2016)

Member of the Connecticut Senate from the 28th district
- In office 1967–1973
- Succeeded by: William Lyons

Member of the Connecticut House of Representatives from the 139th district
- In office 1981–1987
- Preceded by: John McGuirk
- Succeeded by: Alex Knopp

Personal details
- Born: February 18, 1926 South Norwalk, Connecticut, U.S.
- Died: September 27, 2016 (aged 90) Durham, North Carolina, U.S.
- Party: Republican
- Spouse: Barbara Burke Rudolf
- Children: Kathryn Rudolf

Jacob Paul Rudolf (February 18, 1926 – September 27, 2016) was an American politician who was a Republican member of the Connecticut Senate from 1967 to 1973, and the Connecticut House of Representatives from 1981 to 1987. He previously served four terms on the Norwalk Common Council.

Rudolf was an unsuccessful candidate for mayor of Norwalk in 1971, being defeated by Donald J. Irwin. He was an unsuccessful candidate for the Republican nomination for Governor of Connecticut in 1986.

Rudolf died in Durham, North Carolina, on September 27, 2016, at the age of 90.
