= Robert Genuario =

American politician (born 1952)

Member of the Connecticut State Senate from the 25th district
- In office January 9, 1991 – January 5, 2005
- Preceded by: John Atkin
- Succeeded by: Bob Duff

Personal details
- Born: March 31, 1952 (age 74) Norwalk, Connecticut
- Party: Republican
- Spouse: Mary Ann
- Children: 4
- Education: Villanova University (BA, JD)

Robert Genuario (born March 31, 1952) is a Connecticut Superior Court judge appointed by Governor M. Jodi Rell in 2005. He had served as Secretary of the State of Connecticut Office of Policy and Management since January 2005. He was a seven-term Republican member of the Connecticut Senate, representing Norwalk and part of Darien, Connecticut in Connecticut's 25th District from 1991 to 2001.

== Early life and family ==
Genuario received his B.A. degree from Villanova University in 1974, and earned his Juris Doctor degree from Villanova University School of Law in 1977. He is a partner in the Norwalk law firm of Genuario & Conover. He served as a law clerk with the Connecticut Superior Court from 1977 to 1978. Genuario resides in Norwalk with his wife, MaryAnn and four sons, Robert Jr., Eric, Adam and Andrew.

== Political career ==
Prior to his election to the Connecticut Senate, Genuario served as a member of the Norwalk Board of Education from 1981 to 1990, and as its chairman in 1982, 1983, and 1990.

He was president of the Norwalk Jaycees and the former director of the Norwalk Lions Club.

Genuario served on the Boards of Trustees of the Norwalk YMCA, Norwalk Maritime Aquarium, Steppingstones Children’s Museum, the Child Guidance Center of Middle Fairfield County, and Honey Hill Nursing Home.

In 1990, Genuario was elected to the Connecticut Senate. He served as Deputy Minority Leader, and on the following committees:

- Ranking member on the Connecticut General Assembly’s Appropriations Committee
- Ranking member of the General Assembly's Education Committee and the Planning and Development Committee
- Member, Judiciary Committee
- Member, Energy and Technology Committee
- Member Legislative Management Committee
- Member, Governor's Alcohol and Drug Policy Council
- Member, Program Review Committee
- Member, Elementary and Secondary Education Committee
- Member, Program Review Committee
- Member, Elementary and Secondary Education Committee

In January 2005, Genuario was appointed by Governor M. Jodi Rell to run the state Office of Policy and Management.

In 2010, Genuario was appointed to the Connecticut Superior Court by Rell.

== Associations ==
- Board of Trustees, Child Guidance Center Mid-Fairfield, 2001–present
- Board of Trustees, Maritime Aquarium at Norwalk, 2001–present
- Board of Trustees, Stepping Stones Museum for Children, 2000–present
- Board of Trustees, Honey Hill Nursing Home, 1999–present
- Connecticut Bar Association
- President, Norwalk Jaycees
- Director, Norwalk Lions Club

== Awards ==
- Community Justice Coalition of Connecticut Honor Roll (1995)
- Children's Hero Award, Connecticut Children's Trust Fund
- Family Legislator of the Year, Connecticut Association of Family Service Agencies (1996)

Connecticut State Senate
Preceded by John Atkin	Member of the Connecticut State Senate from the 25th district 1991–2005	Succeeded by Bob Duff
