= Andrew J. Santaniello Jr. =

American politician (1926–1986)

Andrew Julio Santaniello

Member of the Connecticut Senate from the 25th district
- In office January 5, 1983 – March 15, 1986
- Preceded by: Alfred Santaniello Jr.
- Succeeded by: Joseph Santo

Personal details
- Born: August 31, 1926 Norwalk, Connecticut, U.S.
- Died: March 15, 1986 (aged 59) Norwalk Hospital, Norwalk, Connecticut, U.S.
- Party: Republican
- Spouse: Ernestine K
- Relatives: Alfred Santaniello Jr. (nephew)
- Occupation: real estate agent

Andrew Julio Santaniello (August 31, 1926 – March 15, 1986) was a Republican member of the Connecticut Senate, representing Norwalk and part of Darien, Connecticut in Connecticut's 25th District from 1983 to 1986. He died in office on March 15, 1986. He was a real estate agent and owned Santaniello Associates in Norwalk. He was on the General Assembly's executive and legislative nominations committee and was a member of the planning and development committee.

== Early life and family ==
Santaniello was born Norwalk, Connecticut on August 31, 1926. He was the son of Andrew Santaniello and Julia Ciarlella.

== Legacy ==
- Andrew J. Santaniello Park is named for him.

Preceded by Alfred Santaniello Jr.	Connecticut Senate; 25th Senate District; 1983–1986	Succeeded by Joseph Santo
