= Connecticut's 5th State Senate district =

American legislative district

Senator
| Derek Slap; D |

Connecticut's 5th State Senate district elects one member of the Connecticut State Senate. It consists of the towns of West Hartford, Burlington, and parts of Bloomfield and Farmington. It is currently represented by Democrat Derek Slap, who has been serving since 2019.

== Recent elections ==
=== 2020 ===
2020 Connecticut State Senate election, District 5
| Party | Candidate | Votes | % |
|---|---|---|---|
| Democratic | Derek Slap (incumbent) | 37,360 | 65.43 |
| Republican | Phillip Chabot | 17,961 | 31.45 |
| Independent Party | Joelle Nawrocki | 1,780 | 3.12 |
| Total votes | | 57,101 | 100.00 |
| Democratic hold | | | |

=== 2018 ===
2018 Connecticut State Senate election, District 5
| Party | Candidate | Votes | % |
|---|---|---|---|
| Democratic | Beth Bye (incumbent) | 30,988 | 65.7 |
| Total | Philip Chabot | 16,192 | 34.3 |
| Republican | Philip Chabot | 15,471 | 32.8 |
| Independent | Philip Chabot | 721 | 1.5 |
| Total votes | | 47,180 | 100.0 |
| Democratic hold | | | |

=== 2016 ===
2016 Connecticut State Senate election, District 5
| Party | Candidate | Votes | % |
|---|---|---|---|
| Democratic | Beth Bye (incumbent) | 30,655 | 59.20 |
| Republican | Mark Merritt | 21,128 | 40.8 |
| Total votes | | 51,783 | 100.0 |
| Democratic hold | | | |

=== 2014 ===
2014 Connecticut State Senate election, District 5
| Party | Candidate | Votes | % |
|---|---|---|---|
| Democratic | Beth Bye (incumbent) | 22,181 | 58.9 |
| Total | Bill Wadsworth | 15,457 | 41.1 |
| Republican | Bill Wadsworth | 14,636 | 38.9 |
| Independent | Bill Wadsworth | 804 | 2.1 |
| Total votes | | 37,638 | 100.0 |
| Democratic hold | | | |

=== 2012 ===
2012 Connecticut State Senate election, District 5
| Party | Candidate | Votes | % |
|---|---|---|---|
| Democratic | Beth Bye (incumbent) | 34,542 | 100 |
| Total votes | | 34,542 | 100.0 |
| Democratic hold | | | |
