= Same-sex marriage in Connecticut =

Same-sex marriage has been legally recognized in Connecticut since November 12, 2008, following the Connecticut Supreme Court's 4–3 ruling in Kerrigan v. Commissioner of Public Health that the state's statutory prohibition on same-sex marriage violated the Constitution of Connecticut and that the state's civil unions failed to provide same-sex couples with rights and privileges equivalent to those of marriage. Connecticut was the second U.S. state to legalize same-sex marriage after neighboring Massachusetts. (Note: Excluding California which had constitutionally banned same-sex marriage in November 2008, but still recognized marriages performed between June and November 2008.) Polling suggests that a large majority of Connecticut residents support the legal recognition of same-sex marriage, with a 2024 Public Religion Research Institute poll showing that 75% of respondents supported same-sex marriage.

The Connecticut General Assembly had enacted a civil union law in 2005 that provided same-sex couples with the same state-level rights and responsibilities as marriage, though the Supreme Court would rule in 2008 that relegating same-sex couples to a status less than full marriage was unconstitutional. The General Assembly repealed the statutory prohibition on same-sex marriage in 2009, and in October 2010 it ended the ability to enter into civil unions.

== Background ==
On February 17, 1987, the Connecticut Supreme Court ruled in Boland v. Catalano that cohabitation agreements between unmarried partners could be enforced, provided they were not based on sexual services. From March 10, 2000 to November 30, 2009, Connecticut offered domestic partnership benefits to state employees. On July 10, 2000, Hartford established a domestic partnership registry, and Mansfield followed suit on October 14, 2003. Both registries are still in effect, and provide couples with some limited health insurance benefits.

== Civil unions ==
The state enacted a civil union law in 2005 that provided same-sex couples with the same rights and responsibilities under state law as marriage, while also explicitly defining marriage as between "one man and one woman". Connecticut became the second state in the United States, following Vermont, to adopt civil unions, and the first to do so without judicial intervention. The bill was passed by the House of Representatives on April 13 in an 85–63 vote and by the Senate on April 20 in a 26–8 vote. Governor Jodi Rell signed the bill into law later the same day, and it went into effect on October 1, 2005. Prior to the passage of the civil union legislation, Connecticut had recognized same-sex relationships solely for the purpose of providing benefits to the same-sex partners of state employees.

Following the Connecticut Supreme Court's October 2008 ruling in Kerrigan, which found that civil unions failed to provide same-sex couples with the rights and responsibilities of marriage, civil unions ceased to be performed and all existing unions were automatically transformed into marriages on October 1, 2010. Same-sex marriages, civil unions and domestic partnerships from other jurisdictions are now legally recognized as marriages in Connecticut.

== Same-sex marriage ==
Same-sex marriage in the United States

=== Statutes ===
On April 11, 1991, the House of Representatives passed legislation prohibiting discrimination based on sexual orientation in housing, employment and credit, along with a provision prohibiting "the recognition of the right of marriage between persons of the same sex". The Senate passed the bill on April 17. Governor Lowell Weicker signed it into law on May 1, and it went into effect on October 1, 1991. On April 29, 2000, the House adopted legislation by a 96–51 vote, stating that the "current public policy of the state of Connecticut is now limited to a marriage between a man and a woman", along with a provision stating that nothing "in this act shall be construed to establish or constitute an endorsement of any public policy with respect to marriage". The Senate approved the bill on May 3 by a vote of 31 to 5. It was signed into law by Governor John G. Rowland on June 1, and went into effect on October 1, 2000. On April 13, 2005, addressing concerns raised by Governor Jodi Rell, the House passed an amendment to the civil union bill, by 80 votes to 67, defining marriage as "the union of one man and one woman". The civil union bill was later passed in the Senate and signed into law by Governor Rell.

On January 31, 2007, State Senator Andrew J. McDonald and State Representative Michael Lawlor, co-chairpersons of the Judiciary Committee, announced the introduction of a bill that would grant same-sex couples full marriage rights in the state of Connecticut. The bill, House Bill 7395, passed the Judiciary Committee by a vote of 27–15 on April 12, 2007. Governor Rell said she would veto any same-sex marriage legislation. The bill was never submitted to the full House or Senate prior to the adjournment of the 2007 legislative session. On April 22, 2009, legislators, both in the House (by a 100–44 vote) and in the Senate (by a 28–7 vote), agreed to replace all statutory references to marriage with gender-neutral language. Governor Rell, a Republican, signed the law on April 23.

April 22, 2009 vote in the House of Representatives
Political affiliation	Voted for	Voted against	Absent (Did not vote)
Democratic Party	91: Catherine Abercrombie; Emil Altobello; Joe Aresimowicz; Christina Ayala; David Baram; Ryan Barry; Jason Bartlett; Beth Bye; Juan Candelaria; Christopher Caruso; Thomasina Clemons; Theresa Conroy; Matthew Conway Jr.; Michelle Cook; Stephen Dargan; Paul Davis; Patricia Dillon; Christopher Donovan; Thomas Drew; Elizabeth Esty; Andy Fleischmann; Mae Flexer; Steve Fontana; Gerald Fox III; Henry Genga; John Geragosian; Demetrios Giannaros; Bob Godfrey; Kenneth Green; Auden Grogins; Gail Hamm; Deborah Heinrich; Jack Hennessy; Ernest Hewett; Gary Holder-Winfield; Annie Hornish; Bryan Hurlburt; Claire Janowski; Karen Jarmoc; Susan Johnson; Shawn Johnston; Ed Jutila; Thomas Kehoe; Barbara Lambert; Tim Larson; Mike Lawlor; Carlo Leone; Matt Lesser; Joan Lewis; Christopher Lyddy; Dorothy McCluskey; Robert Megna; Denise Merrill; Russell Morin; Edward Moukawsher; Mary Mushinsky; Sandy Nafis; Vickie Nardello; Tim O'Brien; Brian O'Connor; Melissa Olson; Linda Orange; Jim O'Rourke; Chris Perone; Lonnie Reed; Peggy Reeves; Thomas Reynolds; Elizabeth Ritter; Hector Robles; Jason Rojas; Kelvin Roldan; Kevin Ryan; Ezequiel Santiago; Peggy Sayers; Linda Schofield; Joseph Serra; James Shapiro; Brendan Sharkey; James Spallone; Cameron Staples; Joseph Taborsak; Kathleen Tallarita; Peter Tercyak; John Thompson; William Tong; Toni Walker; Patricia Widlitz; Roberta Willis; Christopher Wright; Elissa Wright; Bruce Zalaski	17: David Aldarondo; Jeffrey Berger; Betty Boukus; Larry Butler; Paul Esposito; Kim Fawcett; Linda Gentile; Minnie Gonzalez; Ted Graziani; Antonio Guerrera; Douglas McCrory; Steve Mikutel; Patricia Miller; Joseph Mioli; Bruce Morris; Frank Nicastro; Richard Roy	6: Terry Backer; Mary Fritz; Marie Kirkley-Bey; John Mazurek; Diana Urban; Peter Villano
Republican Party	9: Bill Aman; Lawrence Cafero; John Hetherington; Tony Hwang; Themis Klarides; Arthur O'Neill; Jason Perillo; Pamela Sawyer; Sean Williams	27: Mike Alberts; Penny Bacchiochi; Fred Camillo; Vincent Candelora; Mary Ann Carson; Clark Chapin; Christopher Coutu; Anthony D'Amelio; Livvy Floren; John Frey; Lile Gibbons; Janice Giegler; Marilyn Giuliano; William Hamzy; John Harkins; DebraLee Hovey; David Labriola; Timothy LeGeyt; Lawrence Miller; Craig Miner; Selim Noujaim; John Piscopo; Rosa Rebimbas; John Rigby; Thomas Rowe; David Scribner; John Stripp	1: Terrie Wood
Total	100	44	7
Total	66.2%	29.1%	4.6%

April 22, 2009 vote in the Senate
Political affiliation	Voted for	Voted against	Absent (Did not vote)
Democratic Party	23: Thomas Colapietro; Eric Coleman; Joseph Crisco Jr.; Eileen Daily; David DeFronzo; Paul Doyle; Bob Duff; John Fonfara; Thomas Gaffey; Ed Gomes; Mary Ann Handley; Toni Harp; Jonathan Harris; Gary LeBeau; Martin Looney; Andrew Maynard; Andrew McDonald; Edward Meyer; Anthony Musto; Edith Prague; Gayle Slossberg; Andrea Stillman; Donald Williams Jr.	1: Joan Hartley	–
Republican Party	5: Toni Boucher; Dan Debicella; Len Fasano; John McKinney; Andrew Roraback	6: Sam Caligiuri; Scott Frantz; Rob Kane; John Kissel; Michael McLachlan; Kevin Witkos	1: Tony Guglielmo
Total	28	7	1
Total	77.8%	19.4%	2.8%

The definition of marriage in Connecticut is now the following:

Marriage means the legal union of two persons. [CT Gen Stat § 46b-20]

=== Lawsuits ===
==== Kerrigan v. Commissioner of Public Health ====
In August 2004, Gay & Lesbian Advocates & Defenders (GLAD), representing eight same-sex couples from Connecticut, filed a lawsuit in state court, challenging what they described as the state's discriminatory exclusion of same-sex couples from the right to marry. The couples, seven of whom had been denied marriage licenses in Madison, sued the Connecticut Department of Public Health and the Madison registrar of vital statistics, Dorothy Dean. They argued that this discrimination violated the equality and liberty provisions of the Constitution of Connecticut and were supported by the Connecticut Civil Liberties Union. The case was opposed by the Family Institute of Connecticut, which was denied intervenor status in the case. On July 12, 2006, Superior Court Judge Jonathan Silbert ruled against the plaintiffs, finding that:

Civil union and marriage in Connecticut now share the same benefits, protections and responsibilities under law. ... The Connecticut Constitution requires that there be equal protection and due process of law, not that there be equivalent nomenclature for such protection and process.

The judge concluded that denying same-sex couples the right to marry did not violate the Connecticut Constitution. The Supreme Court of Connecticut heard an appeal by the plaintiffs in Kerrigan v. Commissioner of Public Health on May 14, 2007. On October 10, 2008, the court released an opinion guaranteeing marriage rights to same-sex couples. The court ruled 4–3 that denying same-sex couples the right to marry violated the equality and liberty provisions of the Constitution of Connecticut. The court also held that it would be unconstitutional to relegate same-sex couples to a status less than full marriage by enacting legislation treating same-sex unions as civil unions rather than marriage:

Despite the truly laudable effort of the legislature in equalizing the legal rights afforded same sex and opposite sex couples, there is no doubt that civil unions enjoy a lesser status in our society than marriage. We therefore conclude that the plaintiffs have alleged a constitutionally cognizable injury, that is, the denial of the right to marry a same sex partner.

The decision was originally scheduled to go into effect on October 28, 2008, but was delayed until November 12, in order to allow state agencies and local officials time to update procedures and prepare for issuing marriage licenses to same-sex couples. On November 12, the first marriage licenses were issued to same-sex couples in Connecticut. Among the first couples to obtain marriage licenses were plaintiffs in the Kerrigan case, Robin and Barbara Levine-Ritterman in New Haven, and Elizabeth Kerrigan and Joanne Mock-Kerrigan in West Hartford. The court decision made Connecticut the third U.S. state to recognize same-sex marriage, but by the time the first same-sex marriages were solemnized in Connecticut, California voters had approved a same-sex marriage ban by referendum. Governor Rell reacted to the ruling by issuing the statement: "The Supreme Court has spoken. I do not believe their voice reflects the majority of the people of Connecticut. However, I am also firmly convinced that attempts to reverse this decision - either legislatively or by amending the state Constitution - will not meet with success." State Senator Donald E. Williams Jr. called it a "civil rights victory". Before the court issued its decision, a coalition of groups that included such opponents of same-sex marriage as the state's Roman Catholic bishops and the Family Institute of Connecticut supported a November referendum on a proposal to convene a constitutional convention. On November 4, 2008, voters opposed calling a constitution convention by a 2 to 1 margin.

==== Mueller v. Tepler ====
On July 16, 2014, the Connecticut Supreme Court, reversing judgments in lower courts, ruled unanimously that same-sex couples in relationships established before the state afforded legal recognition to same-sex unions should enjoy the same rights as other married couples. In Mueller v. Tepler, it allowed a woman to pursue a medical malpractice claim for the loss of income and companionship resulting from the medical care her female partner had received between 2001 and 2004.

=== Native American nations ===
The Indian Civil Rights Act primarily aims to protect the rights of Native Americans but also reinforces the principle of tribal self-governance. While it does not grant sovereignty, the Act affirms the authority of tribes to govern their own legal affairs. Consequently, many tribes have enacted their own marriage and family laws. As a result, the 2008 state ruling in Kerrigan and the subsequent U.S. Supreme Court's ruling in Obergefell v. Hodges did not automatically apply to tribal jurisdictions. Same-sex marriage has been legal on the reservation of the Mashantucket Pequot Tribe since April 29, 2010. The Tribal Code states that "two persons may be joined in marriage" provided the parties are of marriageable age and meet all the legal requirements to marry. Marriages entered into outside the tribe's jurisdiction are valid if they are valid in the jurisdiction where they were entered into. The tribe also recognizes customary marriages performed according to Indigenous traditions.

Native Americans have deep-rooted marriage traditions, placing a strong emphasis on community, family and spiritual connections. Pequot marriages (wuhsintamuwôk) incorporate spiritual practices such as smudging, traditional clothing, feasting, and dancing. Marriages were exogamous and mostly monogamous, though chiefs (sôcum) occasionally practiced polygyny. While there are no records of same-sex marriages being performed in Native American cultures in the way they are commonly defined in Western legal systems, many Indigenous communities recognize identities and relationships that may be placed on the LGBT spectrum. Among these are two-spirit individuals—people who embody both masculine and feminine qualities. In some cultures, two-spirit individuals assigned male at birth wear women's clothing and engage in household and artistic work associated with the feminine sphere. Historically, this identity sometimes allowed for unions between two people of the same biological sex. In the Mohegan-Pequot language, two-spirit individuals are known as nis mucuhcôqak (pronounced [nɪs mʌtʃʌhˈtʃɔ̃ːkʷək]).

=== Demographics and marriage statistics ===
Data from the 2000 U.S. census showed that 7,386 same-sex couples were living in Connecticut. By 2005, this had increased to 10,174 couples, likely attributed to same-sex couples' growing willingness to disclose their partnerships on government surveys. Same-sex couples lived in all counties of the state, and constituted 1.1% of coupled households and 0.6% of all households in the state. Most couples lived in Hartford, Fairfield and New Haven counties, but the counties with the highest percentage of same-sex couples were Litchfield (0.60% of all county households) and Hartford (0.59%). Same-sex partners in Connecticut were on average younger than opposite-sex partners, and more likely to be employed. In addition, the median household income of same-sex couples was higher than different-sex couples, but same-sex couples were far less likely to own a home than opposite-sex partners. 19% of same-sex couples in Connecticut were raising children under the age of 18, with an estimated 3,140 children living in households headed by same-sex couples in 2005.

17,146 same-sex marriages were performed in Connecticut between 2009 and 2025, mostly in Fairfield, Hartford and New Haven counties. The number of same-sex marriages performed in Connecticut since 2016 is shown in the table below. The 2020 U.S. census showed that there were 7,760 married same-sex couple households (3,432 male couples and 4,328 female couples) and 4,881 unmarried same-sex couple households in Connecticut.

Number of same-sex marriages performed in Connecticut
County	2016	2017	2018	2019	2020	2021	2022	2023	2024	2025	Total
Fairfield	145	142	140	149	155	126	167	181	244	207	1,656
Hartford	174	162	141	154	133	110	185	205	238	227	1,729
Litchfield	41	46	35	22	28	26	43	41	55	43	380
Middlesex	32	34	43	39	21	37	54	54	72	71	457
New Haven	181	183	167	169	132	129	185	168	217	217	1,748
New London	88	71	65	55	50	58	74	65	91	76	693
Tolland	19	16	26	14	15	14	16	10	31	25	186
Windham	21	19	22	15	15	13	33	25	41	19	223
Total	704	672	639	617	549	513	757	749	989	885	7,072

== Public opinion ==
Public opinion for same-sex marriage in Connecticut
Poll source	Dates administered	Sample size	Margin of error	Support	Opposition	Do not know / refused
Public Religion Research Institute	February 28 – December 8, 2025	170 adults	?	69%	28%	3%
Public Religion Research Institute	March 13 – December 2, 2024	281 adults	?	75%	21%	4%
Public Religion Research Institute	March 9 – December 7, 2023	242 adults	?	80%	14%	6%
Public Religion Research Institute	March 11 – December 14, 2022	?	?	81%	18%	1%
Public Religion Research Institute	March 8 – November 9, 2021	?	?	77%	21%	2%
Public Religion Research Institute	April 5 – December 23, 2017	659 adults	?	73%	20%	7%
Public Religion Research Institute	May 18, 2016 – January 10, 2017	1,073 adults	?	70%	20%	10%
Public Religion Research Institute	April 29, 2015 – January 7, 2016	872 adults	?	70%	24%	6%
Public Religion Research Institute	April 2, 2014 – January 4, 2015	565 adults	?	67%	26%	7%
New York Times/CBS News/YouGov	September 20 – October 1, 2014	1,284 likely voters	± 3.3%	61%	26%	13%
Public Policy Polling	July 26–29, 2012	771 voters	± 3.5%	55%	33%	12%
Public Policy Polling	September 22–25, 2011	592 voters	± 4.0%	55%	32%	13%
Quinnipiac University Polling Institute	March 29 – April 4, 2005	1,541 registered voters	± 2.5%	42%	53%	5%
Quinnipiac University Polling Institute	May 26 – June 1, 2004	1,350 registered voters	± 2.7%	45%	50%	5%
University of Connecticut	March 25–29, 2004	606 residents	± 4.0%	49%	46%	5%
Quinnipiac University Polling Institute	October 1–7, 2003	1,519 voters	± 2.5%	44%	50%	6%

== See also ==
- LGBT rights in Connecticut
- Same-sex marriage in the United States
- Same-sex marriage legislation in the United States
- Same-sex marriage law in the United States by state
- Public opinion of same-sex marriage in the United States
- Same-sex marriage status in the United States by state
- Rights and responsibilities of marriages in the United States
- History of civil marriage in the United States
