= 2006 Connecticut Senate election =

2006 Connecticut State Senate election
- November 7, 2006

All 36 seats in the Connecticut State Senate 19 seats needed for a majority
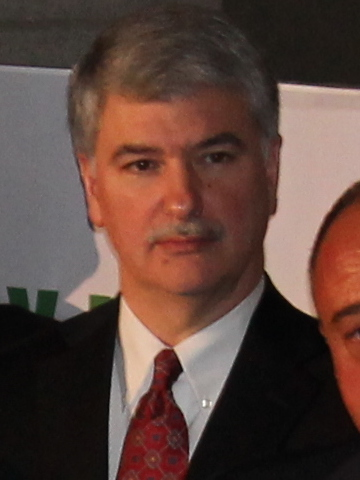

	Majority party	Minority party
Leader	Donald Williams	Louis DeLuca
Party	Democratic	Republican
Leader since	July 1, 2004	2001
Leader's seat	29th	32nd
Last election	24	12
Seats after	24	12
Seat change	Steady	Steady
- Results: Democratic hold Democratic gain Republican hold Republican gain
President pro tempore of the Senate before election
Donald Williams
Democratic
Elected President pro tempore of the Senate
Donald Williams
Democratic

The Connecticut Senate election, 2006 was held on November 7, 2006, to elect Senators to the Connecticut State Senate for the term which began in January 2007 and ended in January 2009. It occurred on the same date as other federal and state elections, including the state's gubernatorial election.

The election saw the election or re-election of 24 Democrats and 12 Republicans to fill the Senate's 36 seats. The incumbent party in each district held onto control of their respective seats in the election, except for two seats which changed control – one from Democratic to Republican, and one from Republican to Democratic.

== Predictions ==
Source	Ranking	As of
Rothenberg	Safe D	November 4, 2006

== Results ==
Results of the 2006 Connecticut Senate election. Party shading denotes winner of Senate seat.

District	Constituency	Incumbent Senator	Republican candidate (percent won)	Democratic candidate (percent won)
1	Hartford (part), Wethersfield (part)	John W. Fonfara (D)	No nomination 0%	John W. Fonfara; 94.1%^{WF}^{TP}
2	Bloomfield (part), Hartford (part), Windsor (part)	Eric D. Coleman (D)	Asim A. Hanif; 15.2%	Eric D. Coleman; 84.8%^{WF}
3	East Hartford, East Windsor, Ellington, South Windsor	Gary LeBeau (D)	Eric A. Thompson Sr. 28.2%	Gary D. LeBeau; 71.8%^{WF}
4	Bolton, Glastonbury, Manchester, Marlborough	Mary Ann Handley (D)	Stewart "Chip" Beckett III; 38.9%	Mary Ann Handley; 61.1%^{WF}
5	Bloomfield (part), Burlington, Farmington (part), West Hartford	Jonathan A. Harris (D)	Kimberly E. Ryder; 29.3%	Jonathan A. Harris; 70.7%^{WF}
6	Berlin, Farmington (part), New Britain	Donald J. DeFronzo (D)	Vacancy in nomination 0%	Donald J. DeFronzo; 100%^{WF}^{RWI}
7	East Granby, Enfield, Granby (part), Somers, Suffield, Windsor (part), Windsor Locks	John A. Kissel (R)	John A. Kissel; 52.7%	William A. Kiner; 47.3%
8	Avon, Barkhamsted, Canton, Colebrook, Granby (part), Hartland, Harwinton (part), New Hartford, Norfolk, Simsbury, Torrington (part)	Thomas J. Herlihy, Jr. (R)	Thomas J. Herlihy, Jr. 50.5%	Steve Berry; 49.5%^{WF}
9	Cromwell, Middletown (part), Newington, Rocky Hill, Wethersfield (part)	Biagio "Billy" Ciotto (D)	Ralph Capenera; 40.3%	Paul R. Doyle; 58.4%^{TP}
10	New Haven (part), West Haven (part)	Toni N. Harp (D)	Melissa Papantones; 12.3%	Toni N. Harp; 87.7%
11	Hamden (part), New Haven (part)	Martin M. Looney (D)	No nomination 0%	Martin M. Looney; 100%
12	Branford, Durham, Gilford, Killingworth, Madison, North Branford	Edward Meyer (D)	Gregg Hannan; 35.7%	Edward Meyer; 64.3%
13	Cheshire (part), Meriden, Middlefield, Middletown (part)	Thomas P. Gaffey (D)	Tod O. Dixon; 23.3%	Thomas P. Gaffey; 76.7%^{WF}
14	Milford, Orange, West Haven (part)	Gayle Slossberg (D)	Barbara L. Lisman; 35.9%	Gayle Slossberg; 64.1%
15	Naugatuck (part), Prospect, Waterbury (part)	Joan V. Hartley (D)	No candidate 0%	Joan V. Hartley; 88.2%^{TP}
16	Cheshire (part), Southington, Waterbury (part), Wolcott	Chris Murphy (D)	Sam S.F. Caligiuri; 54.8%	David Zoni; 45.2%^{I}
17	Ansonia, Beacon Falls, Bethany, Derby, Hamden (part), Naugatuck (part), Woodbridge	Joe Crisco (D)	Boaz Itshaky; 22.7%	Joe Crisco; 77.3%^{WF}
18	Griswold, Groton, North Stonington, Plainfield, Preston, Sterling, Stonington, Voluntown	Cathy W. Cook (R)	Lenny T. Winkler; 48.6%	Andrew M. Maynard; 51.4%
19	Andover, Bozrah, Columbia, Franklin, Hebron, Lebanon, Ledyard, Lisbon, Montville (part), Norwich, Sprague	Edith G. Prague (D)	Matthew Daly; 30.4%	Edith G. Prague; 69.6%
20	East Lyme, Montville (part), New London, Old Lyme, Old Saybrook (part), Salem, Waterford	Andrea Stillman (D)	Christopher F. Oliveira; 39.4%	Andrea L. Stillman; 60.6%
21	Monroe (part), Shelton, Stratford (part)	George L. "Doc" Gunther (R)	Dan Debicella; 52.2%	Christopher Jones; 47.8%^{WF}
22	Bridgeport (part), Monroe (part), Trumbull	Bill A. Finch (D)	Robert D. Russo; 45.6%	Bill Finch; 54.4%^{RWI}
23	Bridgeport (part), Stratford (part)	Ed A. Gomes (D)	Jerry Blackwell; 13.1%	Edwin A. Gomes; 86.9%^{WF}
24	Bethel (part), Danbury, New Fairfield, Sherman	David J. Cappiello (R)	David J. Cappiello; 100%	No nomination 0%
25	Darien (part), Norwalk	Bob Duff (D)	Friedrich Wilms; 34.3%	Bob Duff; 65.7%^{WF}
26	Bethel (part), New Canaan (part), Redding, Ridgefield, Weston (part), Westport, Wilton	Judith Freedman (R)	Judith G. Freedman; 55.6%	Craig Rebecca Schiavone; 44.4%
27	Darien (part), Stamford (part)	Andrew J. McDonald (D)	Rick Giordano; 37.7%	Andrew J. McDonald; 62.3%
28	Easton, Fairfield, Newtown, Weston (part)	John P. McKinney (R)	John P. McKinney; 100%	No nomination 0%
29	Brooklyn, Canterbury, Killingly, Mansfield, Putnam, Scotland, Thompson, Windham	Donald E. Williams, Jr. (D)	David R. Lyon; 24.2%	Donald E. Williams, Jr. 75.8%
30	Brookfield, Canaan, Cornwall, Goshen, Kent, Litchfield, Morris, New Milford, North Canaan, Salisbury, Sharon, Torrington (part), Warren, Washington, Winchester	Andrew W. Roraback (R)	Andrew Roraback; 67%	Matthew F. Brennan; 33%^{WF}
31	Bristol, Harwinton (part), Plainville, Plymouth	Thomas A. Colapietro (D)	Beverly R. Bobroske; 41.5%	Tom Colapietro; 58.5%
32	Bethlehem, Bridgewater, Middlebury, Oxford, Roxbury, Seymour (part), Southbury, Thomaston, Watertown, Woodbury	Louis C. DeLuca (R)	Louis C. DeLuca; 89.3%^{TP}^{RWI}	No candidate 0%
33	Chester, Clinton, Colechester, Deep River, East Haddam, East Hampton, Essex, Haddam, Lyme, Old Saybrook (part), Portland, Westbrook	Eileen M. Daily (D)	Salvatore Nucifora; 26.4%	Eileen M. Daily; 71.6%^{TP}
34	East Haven, North Haven, Wallingford	Len Fasano (R)	Leonard A. Fasano; 85.6%^{TP}	Vacancy in nomination 0%
35	Ashford, Chaplin, Coventry, Eastford, Ellington (part), Hampton, Pomfret, Stafford, Tolland, Union, Vernon, Willington, Woodstock	Tony Guglielmo (R)	Tony Guglielmo; 99.95%^{WF}^{RWI}	Vacancy in nomination 0%
36	Greenwich, New Canaan (part), Stamford (part)	William H. Nickerson (R)	William H. Nickerson; 58.6%^{TP}	Frank A. Farricker; 40.1%

Notes
^{TP} Denotes that a minor, third party candidate also ran in this district's election.

^{RWI} Denotes that a registered write-in candidate was also present in this district's election. However, all write-ins received no votes in their respective district's election, except for 13 received in the 35th District.

^{WF} Denotes that this candidate also ran on the line of the Connecticut Working Families Party. The vote percentage won by this candidate includes both their Working Families and their party of affiliation figures combined.

^{I} Denotes that this candidate also ran on the independent line. The vote percentage won by this candidate includes both their independent and their party of affiliation figures combined.
