= Connecticut's 73rd House of Representatives district =

American legislative district

Connecticut's 73rd State House of Representatives district
Representative
Ronald Napoli Jr. D

Connecticut's 73rd House of Representatives district elects one member of the Connecticut House of Representatives. It encompasses parts of Waterbury and has been represented by Democrat Ronald Napoli Jr. since 2019.

== List of representatives ==
List of representatives from Connecticut's 73rd State House district
Representative	Party	Years	District home	Note
Thomas P. Mondani Sr.	Democratic	1967–1971	Moodus	
David Lavine	Democratic	1971–1973	Durham	Later served as a State Representative in the 100th District from 1977 to 1993
Natalie Rapoport	Democratic	1973–1981	Waterbury	
John G. Rowland	Republican	1981–1985	Waterbury	Later elected to the U.S. Congress and as Governor
Joan Hartley	Democratic	1985–2001	Waterbury	Later elected to the State Senate
Jeffrey J. Berger	Democratic	2001–2019	Waterbury	
Ronald Napoli Jr.	Democratic	2019– present	Waterbury	

== Recent elections ==
=== 2026 ===
2026 Connecticut State House of Representatives election, District 73
Party	Candidate	Votes	%
Democratic	Ronald Napoli Jr. (Incumbent)	TBD	TBD
Republican	Terence Lott Sr.	TBD	TBD
Independent Party	Ronald Napoli Jr. (Incumbent)	TBD	TBD
	Total Votes	TBD	TBD
Results: TBD	Winner: TBD	TBD	TBD

=== 2024 ===
2024 Connecticut State House of Representatives election, District 73
Party	Candidate	Votes	%
Democratic	Ronald Napoli Jr. (Incumbent)	4,867	63.81
Republican	Abigail Diaz Pizarro	2,560	33.6
Working Families	Ronald Napoli Jr. (Incumbent)	107	1.40
Independent Party	Ronald Napoli Jr. (Incumbent)	93	1.22
	Total Votes	7,627	100.0
Democratic Hold	Winner: Ronald Napoli Jr. (Incumbent)	5,067	66.4

=== 2022 ===
2022 Connecticut State House of Representatives election, District 73
Party	Candidate	Votes	%
Democratic	Ronald Napoli Jr. (Incumbent)	3,227	61.61
Republican	Abigail Diaz Pizarro	1,820	34.75
Working Families	Ronald Napoli Jr. (Incumbent)	125	2.39
Independent Party	Abigail Diaz Pizarro	66	1.26
	Total Votes	5,238	100.0
Democratic Hold	Winner: Ronald Napoli Jr. (Incumbent)	3,352	64.0

=== 2020 ===
2020 Connecticut State House of Representatives election, District 73
Party	Candidate	Votes	%
Democratic	Ronald Napoli Jr. (incumbent)	5,702	80.39
Independent Party	Ronald Napoli Jr. (incumbent)	1,029	14.51
Working Families	Ronald Napoli Jr. (incumbent)	362	5.10
Total votes		7,093	100.00
Democratic hold			

=== 2018 ===
2018 Connecticut House of Representatives election, District 73
Party	Candidate	Votes	%
Democratic	Ronald Napoli Jr.	4,026	57.1
Republican	Steven Giacomi	3,025	42.9
Total votes		7,051	100.00
Democratic hold			

=== 2016 ===
2016 Connecticut House of Representatives election, District 73
Party	Candidate	Votes	%
Democratic	Jeffrey J. Berger (Incumbent)	4,293	51.94
Republican	Steven Giacomi	3,972	48.06
Total votes		8,265	100.00
Democratic hold			

=== 2014 ===
2014 Connecticut House of Representatives election, District 73
Party	Candidate	Votes	%
Democratic	Jeffrey J. Berger (Incumbent)	3,200	71.00
Independent Party	Francis J. Caiazzo Jr.	1,012	22.5
Working Families	Jeffrey J. Berger (Incumbent)	294	6.5
Total votes		4,506	100.00
Democratic hold			

=== 2012 ===
2012 Connecticut House of Representatives election, District 73
Party	Candidate	Votes	%
Democratic	Jeffrey J. Berger (Incumbent)	4,540	61.00
Republican	Dennis Odle	2,908	39.00
Total votes		7,448	100.00
Democratic hold			
