= Kathleen Tracy =

American politician (died 1974)

Member of the Connecticut Senate from the 9th district
- In office 1967–1969
- Preceded by: Edward L. Marcus
- Succeeded by: Roger W. Eddy

Member of the Connecticut House of Representatives from Rocky Hill
- In office 1959–1967 Serving with Eli B. Lifshitz (1959–1961); Daniel J. Saunders (1961–1967)
- Preceded by: Norman B. Little; John E. Rust
- Succeeded by: Seat eliminated

Personal details
- Born: 1912 or 1913 Newington, Connecticut, U.S.
- Died: June 18, 1974 (aged 61) Rocky Hill, Connecticut, U.S.
- Party: Democratic
- Spouse: William M. Tracy
- Children: 2

Kathleen McKenna Tracy (1912 or 1913 – June 18, 1974) was an American politician from Connecticut. A Democrat, she represented the town of Rocky Hill in the Connecticut House of Representatives from 1959 to 1967, and the 9th district of the Connecticut State Senate from 1967 to 1969.

== Personal life ==
Tracy was born in 1912 or 1913 in Newington, Connecticut. She was married to William M. Tracy, with whom she had two daughters.

== Political career ==
A Democrat, Tracy was first elected to the Connecticut House of Representatives in 1958, and she served until 1967, representing the town of Rocky Hill. She did not run for reelection in 1966; instead, she ran to represent the 9th district of the Connecticut State Senate. Tracy was elected and succeeded Edward L. Marcus in 1967, serving one term. She ran for reelection in 1968, but was defeated by Republican candidate Roger W. Eddy. She was a member of Rocky Hill's board of education.

== Death ==
Tracy died on June 18, 1974, at her home in Rocky Hill, Connecticut. She was 61.
