= Connecticut's 29th House of Representatives district =

American legislative district

Connecticut's 29th State House of Representatives district
Representative
Kerry Szeps-Wood; D

Connecticut's 29th House of Representatives district elects one member of the Connecticut House of Representatives. Its current representative is Kerry Szeps-Wood. The district consists of the town of Rocky Hill, the historical base of the district in which all representatives since 1975 have lived, and parts of the towns of Newington, which is split between the 24th, 27th and 29th districts, and Wethersfield, which is split between the 28th and 29th districts. Until boundary changes that took effect for the 2002 election, a small portion of the city of Hartford was a part of the district and the portion of Newington currently within the 29th district was a part of the 27th district.

== List of representatives ==
List of Representatives from Connecticut's 29th State House District
Representative	Party	Years	District home	Note
J. Brian Gaffney	Republican	1967–1973	New Britain	Seat created
Thomas M. Kablik	Republican	1973–1975	Wethersfield	
Richard Tulisano	Democratic	1975–2001	Rocky Hill	Retired
Antonio Guerrera	Democratic	2001–2019	Rocky Hill	Won special election
Kerry Szeps Wood	Democratic	2019–	Rocky Hill	

== Recent elections ==
State Election 2012: House District 29
Party	Candidate	Votes	%	±%
Democratic	Antonio Guerrera	7,110	51.4	
Working Families	Antonio Guerrera	3,365	24.3	
Republican	Todd Brown	3,362	24.3	
Majority		10,475	75.7	
Turnout		13,837		
Democratic hold		Swing		

State Election 2008: House District 29
Party	Candidate	Votes	%	±%
Democratic	Antonio Guerrera	8,258	81.8	−11.8
Working Families	Antonio Guerrera	951	9.4	+3.0
Connecticut for Lieberman	Tomoyo Wakamatsu	882	8.7	+8.7
Majority		8,327	82.5	−4.8
Turnout		10,091		
Democratic hold		Swing	-2.3	

State Election 2006: House District 29
Party	Candidate	Votes	%	±%
Democratic	Antonio Guerrera	6,973	93.6	+28.9
Working Families	Brandi Marie Vigue	474	6.4	+6.4
Majority		6,499	87.3	+47.8
Turnout		7,448		
Democratic hold		Swing	+17.7	

State Election 2004: House District 29
Party	Candidate	Votes	%	±%
Democratic	Antonio Guerrera	7,548	64.7	+13.8
Republican	Frank Szeps	4,111	35.3	−13.8
Majority		3,437	29.5	+27.8
Turnout		11,659		
Democratic hold		Swing	+13.8	

State Election 2002: House District 29
Party	Candidate	Votes	%	±%
Democratic	Antonio Guerrera	4,252	50.9	+1.3
Republican	Lori Massey Littmann	4,112	49.1	+13.0
Majority		140	1.7	−12.6
Turnout		8,364		
Democratic hold		Swing	-7.2	

Special election, February 27, 2001: House District 29
Party	Candidate	Votes	%	±%
Democratic	Antonio Guerrera	1,960	49.6	−18.8
Republican	Lori Massey Littmann	1,427	36.1	+4.5
Independent	Joseph A. Denunzio	561	14.3	+14.3
Majority		533	13.5	−23.3
Turnout		3,948		
Democratic hold		Swing	-11.7	

State Election 2000: House District 29
Party	Candidate	Votes	%	±%
Democratic	Richard Tulisano	6,841	68.4	+2.2
Republican	Stuart Webster	3,163	31.6	−2.2
Majority		3,678	36.8	+4.2
Turnout		10,004		
Democratic hold		Swing	+2.2	

State Election 1998: House District 29
Party	Candidate	Votes	%	±%
Democratic	Richard Tulisano	5,055	66.2	
Republican	Stuart Webster	2,582	33.8	
Majority		2,473	32.4	
Turnout		7,637		
Democratic hold		Swing		
