= Edward L. Marcus =

American politician (1927–2022)

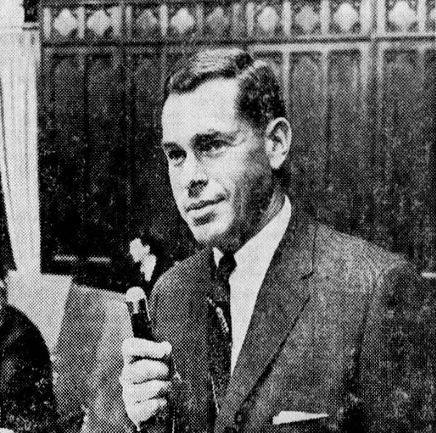
- Marcus in 1967

Member of the Connecticut State Senate from the 9th district
- In office 1959–1967
- Preceded by: Sherman Drutman
- Succeeded by: Kathleen Tracy

Member of the Connecticut State Senate from the 11th district
- In office 1967–1971
- Preceded by: Frank A. Piccolo
- Succeeded by: Joe Lieberman

Personal details
- Born: June 14, 1927 Brooklyn, New York, U.S.
- Died: May 5, 2022 (aged 94)
- Party: Democratic
- Education: Yale University; Yale Law School

Edward L. Marcus (June 14, 1927 – May 5, 2022) was an American politician. He served as a Democratic member for the 9th and 11th district of the Connecticut State Senate.

== Life and career ==
Marcus was born in Brooklyn, New York. He attended Yale University and Yale Law School.

Marcus served in the Connecticut State Senate from 1959 to 1971.

Marcus died on May 5, 2022, at the age of 94.
