= Senator Lesser =

Senator Lesser may refer to:

- Eric Lesser (born 1985), Massachusetts State Senate
- Matt Lesser (born 1983), Connecticut State Senate
