= Senator Marcus =

Senator Marcus may refer to:

- Edward L. Marcus (1927–2022), Connecticut State Senate
- Natasha Marcus (born 1969), North Carolina State Senate
