= Connecticut's 100th House of Representatives district =

American legislative district

Connecticut's 100th State House of Representatives district
Representative
Kai Belton; D

Connecticut's 100th House of Representatives district elects one member of the Connecticut House of Representatives. It encompasses parts of Middletown. The seat has been held by Democrat Kai Belton since March 6, 2023, following a special election after the death of Quentin Williams.

== List of representatives ==
List of Representatives from Connecticut's 100th State House District
Representative	Party	Years	District home	Note
Robert S. Orcutt	Republican	1967–1973	Guilford	Seat created
William L. Churchill	Republican	1973–1975	Durham	
Kathryn Francis	Republican	1975–1977	Durham	
David Lavine	Democratic	1977–1993	Durham	
Susan Bysiewicz	Democratic	1993–1999	Middletown	
Theodore Raczka	Democratic	1999–2003	Middletown	
Raymond Kalinowski	Republican	2003–2009	Durham	
Matt Lesser	Democratic	2009–2019	Middletown	
Quentin Williams	Democratic	2019–2023	Middletown	Died in office
Kai Belton	Democratic	2023–	Middletown	Elected in special election

== Recent elections ==
=== 2023 ===
2023 Connecticut House of Representatives election, District 100 Special Election
Party	Candidate	Votes	%
Democratic	Kai Belton	1,716	68.9
Republican	Deborah Kleckowski	776	31.1
Total votes		2,492	100.00
Democratic hold			

=== 2022 ===
2022 Connecticut State House of Representatives election, District 100
Party	Candidate	Votes	%
Democratic	Quentin Phipps (incumbent)	6,892	60.58
Republican	Tony Gennaro	3,945	34.68
Working Families	Quentin Phipps (incumbent)	539	4.74
Total votes		11,376	100.00
Democratic hold			

=== 2020 ===
2020 Connecticut State House of Representatives election, District 100
Party	Candidate	Votes	%
Democratic	Quentin Phipps (incumbent)	6,892	60.58
Republican	Tony Gennaro	3,945	34.68
Working Families	Quentin Phipps (incumbent)	539	4.74
Total votes		11,376	100.00
Democratic hold			

=== 2018 ===
2018 Connecticut House of Representatives election, District 100
Party	Candidate	Votes	%
Democratic	Quentin Phipps	5,476	60.8
Republican	Anthony Gennaro	3,534	39.2
Total votes		9,010	100.00
Democratic hold			

=== 2016 ===
2016 Connecticut House of Representatives election, District 100
Party	Candidate	Votes	%
Democratic	Matthew Lesser (Incumbent)	7,113	69.4
Republican	Anthony Moran	3,136	30.6
Total votes		10,249	100.00
Democratic hold			

=== 2014 ===
2014 Connecticut House of Representatives election, District 100
Party	Candidate	Votes	%
Democratic	Matthew Lesser (Incumbent)	4,558	63.0
Republican	Angel Fernandez	2,138	29.6
Working Families	Matthew Lesser (Incumbent)	537	7.4
Total votes		7,233	100.00
Democratic hold			

=== 2012 ===
2012 Connecticut House of Representatives election, District 100
Party	Candidate	Votes	%
Democratic	Matthew Lesser (Incumbent)	6,677	68.6
Republican	Deborah Kleckowski	3,057	31.4
Total votes		10,249	100.00
Democratic hold			
