= Jeffrey J. Berger =

American politician (born 1955)

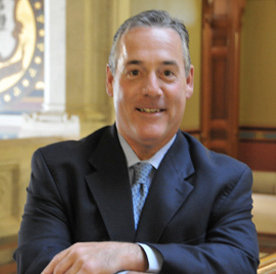

Member of the Connecticut House of Representatives from the 73rd district
- In office January 2001 – January 9, 2019
- Preceded by: Joan Hartley
- Succeeded by: Ronald Napoli Jr.

Personal details
- Born: May 12, 1955 (age 71) Waterbury, Connecticut, U.S.
- Party: Democratic
- Spouse: Noreen Berger
- Education: Eckerd College
- Profession: Realtor

Jeffrey J. Berger (born May 12, 1955) is an American Democratic politician in the state of Connecticut. He represented the 73rd district in the Connecticut House of Representatives from 2001 to 2019.

== Personal life and education ==
Berger grew up in Waterbury, Connecticut, raised by father Joseph M. Berger, mother Phyllis Gualtieri Berger. He has one brother, Mitchell M. Berger.

Berger attended both public and private schools including John F. Kennedy High School and Millbrook School in Millbrook, New York. He studied at Springfield College in Springfield, Massachusetts, ultimately graduating from Eckerd College in St. Petersburg, Florida in 1978 with a double major: BS‚ Social Studies, and BA‚ Psychology, and receiving a Secondary Teaching certification. He completed post-graduate work at the University of New Haven, earning graduate credits toward an MBA. He is a realtor and former middle school teacher and coach, and is retired from the Waterbury Police Department after 20 years of service.

He and his family reside in the Bunker Hill section of Waterbury.

== Community involvement ==
Berger is a member of numerous community organizations, including the Advisory Council for the North District Board of Education, Police Mutual Aid Society, the Elks Lodge, the Connecticut Council of Police division of the AFSCME union, and the Western Hills Golf and Social Club in Waterbury.

Berger led the charge for redevelopment and design of Bunker Hill Park, and The Ray Snyder Sr. Field at Municipal Stadium, Kaynor Technical School. He is a supporter of Brownfields re-mediation and development to fully utilize the space of the many closed and abandoned warehouses and factories in the city. He has also worked to increase and expand the film industry in Connecticut, increasing investments and movie production by over 200% since 2005.

== Legislative accomplishments ==
Berger served five terms in the Connecticut General Assembly. He was House Chair of the Commerce Committee and served on the Finance, Revenue and Bonding, and Judiciary Committees.

Berger co-sponsored and introduced proposed legislation regarding car tax reform for large municipalities, background checks for caregivers dealing with the mentally challenged, and a DNA database of samples taken from convicted felons.

Berger's accomplishments and awards include the Waterbury Police Department Medal of Excellence, Level IV Medal, I Ribbon with Star, 14 Departmental Commendations, FBI SWAT training, and Century-21 multimillion-dollar sales associate.
