= Connecticut's 96th House of Representatives district =

American legislative district

Connecticut's 96th State House of Representatives district
Representative
Roland Lemar; D

Connecticut's 96th House of Representatives district elects one member of the Connecticut House of Representatives. It encompasses parts of New Haven and East Haven and has been represented by Democrat Roland Lemar since 2011.

== List of representatives ==
List of Representatives from Connecticut's 96th State House District
Representative	Party	Years	District home	Note
Rollin W. Mettler Jr.	Democratic	1967–1973	Hamden	Seat created
Thomas W. O'Dea	Democratic	1973–1975	New Haven	
Vincent Villano	Democratic	1975–1979	New Haven	
Joseph M. Carbone	Democratic	1979–1981	New Haven	
Martin Looney	Democratic	1981–1993	New Haven	
Cameron Staples	Democratic	1993–2011	New Haven	
Roland Lemar	Democratic	2011–	New Haven	

== Recent elections ==
=== 2020 ===
2020 Connecticut State House of Representatives election, District 96
Party	Candidate	Votes	%
Democratic	Roland Lemar (incumbent)	6,797	69.78
Republican	Eric Michael Mastroianni Sr.	2,152	22.09
Working Families	Roland Lemar (incumbent)	638	6.55
Independent Party	Eric Michael Mastroianni Sr.	154	1.58
Total votes		9,741	100.00
Democratic hold			

=== 2018 ===
2018 Connecticut House of Representatives election, District 96
Party	Candidate	Votes	%
Democratic	Roland Lemar	6,648	80.6
Republican	Eric Mastroianni	1,598	19.4
Total votes		8,246	100.00
Democratic hold			

=== 2016 ===
2016 Connecticut House of Representatives election, District 96
Party	Candidate	Votes	%
Democratic	Roland Lemar	5,918	100.00
Total votes		5,918	100.00
Democratic hold			

=== 2014 ===
2014 Connecticut House of Representatives election, District 96
Party	Candidate	Votes	%
Democratic	Roland Lemar	5,125	100.00
Total votes		5,125	100.00
Democratic hold			

=== 2012 ===
2012 Connecticut House of Representatives election, District 96
Party	Candidate	Votes	%
Democratic	Roland Lemar	6,848	100.00
Total votes		6,848	100.00
Democratic hold			
