= Theresa Taneszio =

American politician (1910–1984)

Member of the Connecticut House of Representatives from the 107th district
- In office 1967–1973
- Preceded by: Seat established
- Succeeded by: Francis J. Collins

Personal details
- Born: September 15, 1910 New Haven, Connecticut, U.S.
- Died: January 17, 1984 (aged 73) New Haven, Connecticut, U.S.
- Party: Democratic
- Spouse: Anthony Taneszio
- Children: 2

Theresa Taneszio (September 15, 1910 – January 17, 1984) was an American politician who served in the Connecticut House of Representatives from 1967 to 1973, representing the 107th district as a Democrat. She lived in New Haven during her tenure.
