= Biagio Ciotto =

American politician (1929–2021)

Biagio "Billy" Ciotto

Member of the Connecticut State Senate from the 9th district
- In office January 4, 1995 – January 3, 2007
- Preceded by: Richard Balducci
- Succeeded by: Paul Doyle

Personal details
- Born: December 25, 1929 Hartford, Connecticut, U.S.
- Died: March 20, 2021 (aged 91) Wethersfield, Connecticut, U.S.
- Party: Democratic
- Spouse: Jeanne Miller

Biagio "Billy" Ciotto (December 25, 1929 – March 20, 2021) was an American politician from Connecticut. Ciotto, a Democrat, served in the Connecticut State Senate from 1995 to 2007. Before retiring in 2006, Ciotto had served as Majority Caucus Chair in the Senate. Prior to holding elective office, Ciotto worked for the Connecticut Department of Motor Vehicles, retiring as a Deputy Commissioner in 1989.
