= Amy Morrin Bello =

American politician

Member of the Connecticut House of Representatives from the 28th district
- Incumbent
- Assumed office January 6, 2021
- Preceded by: Russell Morin

Personal details
- Born: 1972 (age 53–54)
- Party: Democratic
- Education: Providence College (BA)

Amy Morrin Bello (born 1972) is an American politician serving as a member of the Connecticut House of Representatives from the 28th district. Elected in November 2020, she assumed office on January 6, 2021.

== Education ==
Morrin Bello earned a Bachelor of Arts degree in humanities from Providence College.

== Career ==
Morrin Bello worked as assistant town clerk in Wethersfield, Connecticut from 1994 to 1999 and 2008 to 2012. She served as a member of the Wethersfield Town Council from 2015 to 2020, serving as its mayor from 2017 to 2019. Morrin Bello was elected to the Connecticut House of Representatives in November 2020 and assumed office on January 6, 2021. Morrin Bello also works as an administrative assistant in the African-American Studies Department at Wesleyan University.
