= Connecticut's 28th House of Representatives district =

American legislative district

Connecticut's 28th State House of Representatives district
Representative
Amy Morrin Bello; D

Connecticut's 28th House of Representatives district elects one member of the Connecticut House of Representatives. Its current representative is Amy Morrin Bello. The district consists of most of the town of Wethersfield, which is divided between the 28th assembly district and the 29th assembly district.

== List of representatives ==
List of Representatives from Connecticut's 28th State House District
Representative	Party	Years	District home	Note
John J. Moskus	Democratic	1967–1969	New Britain	Seat created
Joseph Gregorzek	Democratic	1969–1973	New Britain	
John M. Hennessey	Democratic	1973–1975	Wethersfield	
Robert G. Gilligan	Democratic	1975–1995	Wethersfield	
Paul Doyle	Democratic	1995–2007	Wethersfield	Elected to Connecticut State Senate
Russell Morin	Democratic	2007–2021	Wethersfield	Did not seek reelection
Amy Morrin Bello	Democratic	2021–present	Wethersfield	Incumbent

== Recent elections ==
State Election 2020: House District 28
Party	Candidate	Votes	%	±%
Democratic	Amy Morrin Bello	7,708	53.6	−3.8
Republican	Patrick Pentalow	6,146	42.8	+0.2
Independent	Henry Thayer	168	1.2	+1.2
Working Families	Amy Morrin Bello	355	2.5	+2.5
Turnout		14,377		
Democratic hold		Swing	-3.8	

State Election 2018: House District 28
Party	Candidate	Votes	%	±%
Democratic	Russell A. Morin	6,563	57.4	+4.9
Republican	Michael J. Hurley	4,866	42.6	−3.8
Turnout		11,492		
Democratic hold		Swing	+4.9	

State Election 2016: House District 28
Party	Candidate	Votes	%	±%
Democratic	Russell A. Morin	6,756	52.5	+3.0
Republican	Michael J. Hurley	5,971	46.4	+0.5
Unaffiliated	Lee Johnson	151	1.2	+1.2
Turnout		12,878		
Democratic hold		Swing	+3.0	

State Election 2014: House District 28
Party	Candidate	Votes	%	±%
Democratic	Russell A. Morin	4,703	49.5	−10.3
Republican	Michael J. Hurley	4,356	45.9	+5.7
Working Families	Russell A. Morin	302	3.2	+3.2
Independent	Michael J. Hurley	139	1.5	+1.5
Turnout		9,500		
Democratic hold		Swing	-10.3	

State Election 2012: House District 28
Party	Candidate	Votes	%	±%
Democratic	Russell A. Morin	6,958	59.8	+1.5
Republican	John J. Console	4,673	40.2	−1.5
Turnout		11,631		
Democratic hold		Swing	+1.5	

State Election 2010: House District 28
Party	Candidate	Votes	%	±%
Democratic	Russell A. Morin	5,390	58.3	−5.9
Republican	Peter E. Gardow	3,848	41.7	+5.9
Turnout		9,238		
Democratic hold		Swing	-5.9	

State Election 2008: House District 28
Party	Candidate	Votes	%	±%
Democratic	Russell A. Morin	7,713	64.2	+4.4
Republican	John Cusano	4,306	35.8	−4.4
Turnout		12,019		
Democratic hold		Swing	+4.4	

State Election 2006: House District 28
Party	Candidate	Votes	%	±%
Democratic	Russell A. Morin	5,813	59.8	−40.2
Republican	Donna H. Hemmann	3,904	40.2	+40.2
Turnout		9,717		
Democratic hold		Swing	-40.2	
