= Kathryn Francis =

American politician (died 2005)

Member of the Connecticut House of Representatives from the 100th district
- In office 1975–1977
- Preceded by: William L. Churchill
- Succeeded by: David Lavine

Personal details
- Born: Kathryn Gilbert; 1920 or 1921 Philadelphia, Pennsylvania, U.S.
- Died: January 11, 2005 (aged 84) Middletown, Connecticut, U.S.
- Party: Republican
- Children: 5
- Education: Goucher College

Kathryn Francis (née Gilbert; 1920 or 1921 – January 11, 2005) was an American politician who served in the Connecticut House of Representatives from 1975 to 1977, representing the 100th district as a Republican.

== Personal life ==
Francis was born Kathryn Gilbert in Philadelphia, Pennsylvania. She worked as an educator at St. Peter's School, Philadelphia, and in 1942, she graduated from Goucher College in Towson, Maryland. She had five children.

Francis died on January 11, 2005, in Middletown, Connecticut. She was 84.

== Political career ==
Francis was elected to the Connecticut House of Representatives in 1974, and she served one term representing the 100th district as a Republican. She ran for reelection in 1976, but was defeated by Democratic candidate David Lavine.

Francis served on the Republican Town Committee of Durham, Connecticut, and as chairwoman of its historical society.
