= Natalie Rapoport =

American politician (1927–2022)

Member of the Connecticut House of Representatives from the 73rd district
- In office 1973–1981
- Preceded by: David Lavine
- Succeeded by: John G. Rowland

Personal details
- Born: Natalie Rabinowitz; April 22, 1927 Waterbury, Connecticut, U.S.
- Died: November 14, 2022 (aged 95) Easton, Maryland, U.S.
- Party: Democratic
- Spouse: Samuel Rapoport
- Children: 2
- Education: Western Connecticut State University (B.S.)

Natalie Rapoport (April 22, 1927 – November 14, 2022) was an American politician who served in the Connecticut House of Representatives from 1973 to 1981, representing the 73rd district as a Democrat. Rapoport was Jewish and served as president of the Connecticut branch of the Women's League for Conservative Judaism and president of the Southbury branch of Hadassah. She graduated Western Connecticut State University. Following her service in the Connecticut House of Representatives, she worked as an education specialist for the Connecticut State Department of Education.
