= Kai Belton =

American politician

Member of the Connecticut House of Representatives from the 100th district
- Incumbent
- Assumed office March 6, 2023
- Preceded by: Quentin Williams

Personal details
- Party: Democrat

Kai Juanna Belton is a Democratic member of the Connecticut House of Representatives serving in the 100th district since a 2023 special election. She is a physician by profession.
