= LGBTQ rights in Connecticut =

- Connecticut (US)
- Legal status: Legal since 1971
- Gender identity: Transgender people allowed to change gender without surgery
- Discrimination protections: Sexual orientation and gender identity/expression protections

Family rights
- Recognition of relationships: Same-sex marriage since 2008
- Adoption: Same-sex couples permitted to adopt

The establishment of lesbian, gay, bisexual, transgender, and queer (LGBTQ) rights in the U.S. state of Connecticut is a recent phenomenon, with most advances in LGBTQ rights taking place in the late 20th century and early 21st century. Connecticut was the second U.S. state to enact two major pieces of pro-LGBTQ legislation; the repeal of the sodomy law in 1971 and the legalization of same-sex marriage in 2008. State law bans unfair discrimination on the basis of sexual orientation and gender identity in employment, housing and public accommodations, and both conversion therapy and the gay panic defense are outlawed in the state.

Connecticut is regarded as one of the most LGBTQ-friendly U.S. states, on account of its early adoption of LGBT rights legislation. A 2017 survey by the Public Religion Research Institute showed that 73% of Connecticut residents supported same-sex marriage.

== History and legality of same-sex sexual activity ==
The Fundamental Orders, which established Connecticut as a self-ruling colony in 1639, provided that laws adopted by the Connecticut authorities would be consistent with those of England. As a result, common law was adopted in the colony, which recognized sodomy as a capital offense for males only. A sodomy statute providing for the death penalty was passed in 1642. There are several known cases of men being executed under the statute, including William Plaine of Guilford in 1646 for having masturbated a number of young men in the town. In 1655, a servant named John Knight was executed in the New Haven Colony for having engaged in consensual sex with both men and women. The statute was enforced inconsistently, however; for example, in 1677 Nicholas Sension was sentenced in the town of Windsor to "good behavior for the rest of his life", escaping the death penalty most likely due to his wealth.

Following independence in 1776, Connecticut continued to enforce common law. In 1821, the Connecticut General Assembly adopted a new criminal code that made several changes to the sodomy statute. Firstly, the death penalty was removed as a penalty and replaced by life imprisonment, and secondly only males could be the victims of an act of sodomy though the perpetrator could be of either sex. The new law criminalized "carnal knowledge", allowing for the prosecution of anal intercourse and possibly fellatio (oral sex). There are no published sodomy cases during this period, so it is unknown if oral sex was prosecuted under this law. In 1909, the penalty for sodomy was reduced from life imprisonment to 30 years in prison.

In 1811, the Connecticut Supreme Court ruled in Fowler v. State that the state's law against "lascivious carriage and behavior" applied only to conduct between people of the opposite sex. This court case was significant in 1962, when Max Fenster, accused of same-sex "lascivious carriage and behavior", argued in court that under Fowler the law covered only opposite-sex conduct. Reluctantly, the court unanimously agreed.

Legislative commission reports in 1967 and 1968 recommended the repeal of the sodomy law because it "deterred deviates from seeking psychiatric help" and it "was enforced only by 'capricious selection', which encourages blackmail." A comprehensive criminal code was passed in 1969, which abrogated common-law crimes and repealed the sodomy law in relation to consensual acts, and took effect in 1971. The age of consent was set at 16 regardless of gender and sexual orientation, and lowered to 15 in 1975. This made Connecticut the second U.S. state to decriminalise same-sex couples after Illinois.

In 1970, the Commissioner of Motor Vehicles denied a driver's license to David Fowlett because of his sexual orientation. Fowlett later committed suicide.

== Recognition of same-sex relationships ==
Connecticut enacted a civil union law on October 1, 2005 that provided same-sex couples with some of the same rights and responsibilities under state law as married couples.

On October 10, 2008, the Connecticut Supreme Court ruled in Kerrigan v. Commissioner of Public Health that same-sex couples have a constitutional right to marry and said the state's civil union statute violated the equal protection clause of the state Constitution. The decision came in response to a case brought in 2004 by eight same-sex couples who were denied marriage licenses in the town of Madison. The first same-sex marriages in Connecticut took place on November 12.

In April 2009, the Connecticut General Assembly passed a bill to fully codify same-sex marriage in state statutes, abolish civil unions, and all existing civil unions automatically became civil marriages from October 1, 2010. The bill was signed into law by Republican governor Jodi Rell.

== Adoption and parenting ==
Connecticut allows adoption by single individuals, opposite-sex and same-sex couples, unmarried or married. Statutes state that the sexual orientation of a prospective adoptive parent may be considered in adoption decisions, but there is no evidence that an adoption has been denied on the basis of sexual orientation.

In May 2018, the Connecticut Department of Children and Families launched a campaign designed with encouraging same-sex couples to apply to become adoptive parents. Governor Dannel Malloy also called on more couples to apply, adding that about 4,000 children were in foster care at that time.

Lesbian couples have access to in vitro fertilization (IVF). State law recognizes the non-genetic, non-gestational mother as a legal parent to a child born via donor insemination, but the parents are required to be married. Connecticut law requires the Office of Vital Records to issue birth certificates to intended parents in a gestational surrogacy arrangement. No law prohibits traditional surrogacy, and the practice is thus presumably legal. Same-sex couples are treated in the same manner as opposite-sex couples.

=== Parentage reforms bill ===
In May 2021, the Connecticut General Assembly passed a bill to legally recognise same-sex parentage for children of same-sex couples (to be inline with the rest of New England region) - without regards to the "marital status concept" of any parents. Current Connecticut uniform IVF laws, legally require that couples of any sex "to be married" - to have children recognised on their birth certificates legally. The governor of Connecticut Ned Lamont signed the bill into law and went into effect on October 1, 2021.

== Discrimination protections ==
Connecticut bans discrimination on the basis of sexual orientation and gender identity or expression in public places, public and private employment, governmental services and in receiving goods and services from public places or governmental institutions. Sexual orientation discrimination has been prohibited in the state since 1991, and gender identity or expression was added to the state's anti-discrimination law in 2011.

Moreover, the state's anti-bullying law prohibits bullying on the basis of race, color, religion, ancestry, national origin, sex, sexual orientation, gender identity and expression, socio-economic status, academic status, physical appearance, mental, physical, developmental and sensory disability and association with an individual or group of people that have one or more of such characteristics. The law also explicitly includes cyberbullying and harassment, and applies to all school premises in the state.

In June 2023, a bill passed the Connecticut Legislature that "reforms and updates" the archaic definition of sexual orientation within the code - that was implemented back in 1991. The governor of Connecticut is yet to either sign or veto the bill.

== Hate crime law ==
All citizens under state law are protected from hate crimes motivated by sexual orientation and gender identity or expression, alongside other categories. The law provides additional penalties for the commission of a hate crime.

Effective from October 1, 2026 new reformed and updated legislation was signed in law in June 2026 to consolidate and strengthen hate crime legislation within Connecticut and still explicitly includes sexual orientation and gender identity and expression.<ref>[https://portal.ct.gov/governor/news/press-releases/2026/06-2026/governor-lamont-signs-legislation-strengthening-the-ability-to-prosecute-hate-crimes?language=en_US]/ref>

== Transgender rights ==
In June 2015, the Connecticut General Assembly passed H.B. No. 7006 (passing the Senate by a vote of 32–3 and the House by a vote of 126–18) to make it easier for transgender people to change the gender marker on their birth certificate without undergoing surgery. Governor Dannel Malloy signed the bill into law and it went into effect on October 1, 2015. The Department of Public Health will issue an updated birth certificate with the corrected sex designation upon receipt of a notarized affidavit completed by the applicant requesting the change and a notarized affidavit from a licensed physician, advanced practice registered nurse or psychologist stating that the applicant has undergone appropriate clinical treatment (such as hormone therapy). The state will also change the sex designation on a driver's license and state ID card upon request. Birth certificates, IDs and driver's licenses offer three sex options, that is "M" (male), "F" (female) and "X".

=== Prison reform ===
On July 1, 2018, Connecticut became the first jurisdiction in the United States to ensure all individuals are treated consistent with their gender identity including with regard to strip searches and access to clothing, commissary items and educational materials, as well as housing based on their recognized gender.

=== Sports ===
In April 2021, a federal judge dismissed the 2020 high-profile lawsuits regarding transgender individuals playing sports and athletics within Connecticut. This automatically triggered a wave of 50+ bills across various state legislatures of the US and US Congress - about legally banning transgender individuals playing sports and athletics.

== Gay panic defense ==
In June 2019, the Connecticut General Assembly unanimously passed a bill to repeal the gay panic defense. The bill was signed into law by Governor Ned Lamont, and went into force on October 1, 2019.

== Conversion therapy ==
On May 2, 2017, the Connecticut House of Representatives passed a bill (HB 6695), by a vote of 141–8, to ban conversion therapy on minors. The bill passed by a unanimous vote of 36–0 in the Hung 18-Republican and 18-Democrat Connecticut Senate on May 10. Governor Dannel Malloy signed the bill into law immediately after, and it went into effect immediately.

== LGBTQ discharged veteran's military benefits ==
In July 2021, Governor of Connecticut signed a bill into law that implemented state-based LGBTQ discharged veteran's military benefits. New York State, New Jersey, Colorado and Rhode Island have similar laws.

== Public opinion ==
A 2017 Public Religion Research Institute poll found that 73% of Connecticut residents supported same-sex marriage, while 20% were opposed and 7% were unsure.

A 2022 Public Religion Research Institute (PRRI) poll found that 81% of Connecticut residents supported same-sex marriage, while 18% were opposed and 1% were unsure.

Public opinion for LGBTQ anti-discrimination laws in Connecticut
| Poll source | Date(s) administered | Sample size | Margin of error | % support | % opposition | % no opinion |
|---|---|---|---|---|---|---|
| Public Religion Research Institute | January 2-December 30, 2019 | 604 | ? | 77% | 17% | 6% |
| Public Religion Research Institute | January 3-December 30, 2018 | 543 | ? | 76% | 19% | 5% |
| Public Religion Research Institute | April 5-December 23, 2017 | 659 | ? | 77% | 17% | 6% |
| Public Religion Research Institute | April 29, 2015-January 7, 2016 | 872 | ? | 77% | 18% | 5% |

== Summary table ==
| Same-sex sexual activity legal | Yes (Since 1971) |
| Equal age of consent (16) | Yes (Since 1971) |
| Anti-discrimination laws in all areas | Yes (Sexual orientation since 1991 and gender identity since 2011) |
| Same-sex marriages | Yes (Since 2008; codified into law in 2009) |
| Recognition of same-sex couples (e.g. civil union) | Yes (Since 2005) |
| Stepchild and joint adoption by same-sex couples | Yes |
| Lesbian, gay and bisexual people allowed to serve openly in the military | Yes (Since 2011) |
| Transgender people allowed to serve openly in the military | No (Federal ban since 2025) |
| Intersex people allowed to serve openly in the military | (Current DoD policy bans "hermaphrodites" from serving or enlisting in the military) |
| Right to change legal gender without sex reassignment surgery | Yes |
| Access to IVF for lesbian couples | Yes |
| Automatic parenthood on birth certificates for children of same-sex couples - regardless of marital status | Yes (Effective from October 1, 2021) |
| Gay and trans panic defense | Yes (Since 2019) |
| Conversion therapy banned on minors | Yes (Since 2017) |
| Third gender option | Yes |
| LGBTQ anti-bullying law in schools and colleges | Yes |
| Surrogacy arrangements legal for gay male couples | Yes |
| MSMs allowed to donate blood | Yes (Since 2023) |

== See also ==
- Same-sex marriage in Connecticut
- LGBTQ rights in the United States
