= Kerry Szeps Wood =

American politician from Connecticut

Member of the Connecticut House of Representatives from the 29th district
- Incumbent
- Assumed office January 9, 2019
- Preceded by: Antonio Guerrera

Personal details
- Born: April 13, 1978 (age 48) Rocky Hill, Connecticut, U.S.
- Party: Democratic
- Education: American University (BA, BS)

Kerry Szeps Wood (born April 13, 1978) is an American politician who serves in the Connecticut House of Representatives representing the 29th district in Hartford County. She has held the position since 2018.

== Personal life ==
=== Career ===
Wood currently works at New England Retail Properties in Wethersfield as a commercial real estate agent.

== Political career ==
Wood is a current member of the Rocky Hill Democratic Town Committee and served as president of the CT Young Democrats.

She was first elected to the State House in the general election on November 6, 2018, winning 56 percent of the vote over 44 percent of Republican candidate Andrew Lanciotto. Prior to her election, the office was filled by current Department of Motor Vehicles (DMV) Commissioner Antonio Guerrera (D), who had stepped down to run for an open seat in Connecticut's 9th State Senate district.

Currently, Wood serves as Co-Chair of the Insurance & Real Estate Committee. She is also a member of the Finance, Revenue & Bonding Committee and the Commerce Committee in the Connecticut General Assembly.

=== Election results ===
2022 General election for Connecticut House of Representatives District 29
Party	Candidate	Votes	%
Democratic	Kerry Szeps Wood*	4,939	54.7
Republican	Pankaj Prakash	4,092	45.3

2020 General election for Connecticut House of Representatives District 29
Party	Candidate	Votes	%
Democratic	Kerry Szeps Wood*	7,776	57.9
Republican/Independent	Henry Vasel	5,663	42.1

2018 General election for Connecticut House of Representatives District 29
Party	Candidate	Votes	%
Democratic	Kerry Szeps Wood	5,817	55.7
Republican	Andrew Lanciotto	4,622	44.3
