= Iyanla: Fix My Life =

American reality television series

- Genre: Reality
- Presented by: Iyanla Vanzant
- Country of origin: United States
- Original language: English
- No. of seasons: 10
- No. of episodes: 136

Production
- Executive producers: Iyanla Vanzant; Paul Harrison
- Running time: 41 to 44 minutes
- Production companies: Pigeon, Inc.

Original release
- Network: Oprah Winfrey Network
- Release: June 2, 2012 – May 22, 2021

Iyanla: Fix My Life is an American reality television series hosted by Yoruba priestess, life coach and relationship expert Iyanla Vanzant on the Oprah Winfrey Network. A sneak preview episode aired on June 2, 2012, and the series debuted with a two-part series premiere on September 15 and September 16, 2012.

On March 17, 2021, it was announced that the series would conclude with a two-hour farewell special on May 22, 2021.

== Background ==
Iyanla: Fix My Life features Vanzant helping people overcome difficulties in their lives. Each episode focuses on a specific problem posed by the story of one guest (or group of guests), with pre-taped production pieces at the guest's home and interviews with Iyanla that provide commentary throughout the show. Iyanla attempts to bring a different perspective to the situation and updates are provided to viewers at the close of each episode regarding the guest's progress since the date of filming.

== Episodes ==
=== Series overview ===
Season	Episodes	Originally released	
Season	Episodes	First released	Last released
1	13	June 2, 2012	November 24, 2012
2	6	April 13, 2013	May 18, 2013
3	12	July 27, 2013	December 14, 2013
4	16	May 10, 2014	October 18, 2014
5	9	March 28, 2015	November 7, 2015
6	10	September 10, 2016	November 12, 2016
7	16	April 15, 2017	November 18, 2017
8	20	March 3, 2018	October 13, 2018
9	20	January 12, 2019	August 3, 2019
10	14	October 31, 2020	May 15, 2021

=== Season 1 (2012) ===
No. overall	No. in season	Title	Original release date	U.S. viewers (millions)
1	1	"Fix My Broken Family"	June 2, 2012	0.38
In the sneak preview episode, Iyanla hits the road to help a family in crisis. She lays the foundation for healing as she helps three generations of women—Bernetta, Brenda and Corrine—begin to tell the truth. Iyanla provides the tools to restore mother-daughter relationships and offers advice on how to keep lines of communication open.
2	2	"Fix My Reality Star Life: Part 1"	September 15, 2012	1.12
In the series premiere, Iyanla travels to Miami to visit Evelyn Lozada, star of Basketball Wives, weeks before the headline making news of the alleged domestic violence incident between her and her NFL star husband, Chad Ochocinco Johnson. To be continued...
3	3	"Fix My Reality Star Life: Part 2"	September 16, 2012	1.59
In Part 2 of the series premiere, Iyanla heads to New York to support Evelyn Lozada, star of Basketball Wives, after the headline making news of the alleged domestic abuse incident between her and husband, Chad Ochocinco Johnson.
4	4	"Fix My Family Secret"	September 22, 2012	0.45
Iyanla heads to Dallas, Texas to help a local DJ and his mother heal from a secret that has torn them apart. Iyanla will work with the son to forgive his mother for lying to him about the identity of his biological father.
5	5	"Fix My Mistake"	September 29, 2012	0.54
Iyanla heads to Battle Creek, Nebraska to help heal a family in crisis. She works with a mother who has run away from her family after having an affair. Now three years later, the mom is desperate to re-connect with her two sons and ex-husband.
6	6	"Fix My Backstabbing Friends"	October 6, 2012	0.65
Iyanla dishes out relationship advice to the bloggers of Six Brown Chicks.
7	7	"Fix My Absent Father"	October 13, 2012	0.53
Iyanla helps four adult siblings deal with complicated emotions about their drug-addicted father, who was in prison for most of their lives.
8	8	"Fix My Feuding Sisters"	October 20, 2012	0.55
Iyanla works with estranged sisters after their mother's death.
9	9	"Fix My Transgender Life"	October 27, 2012	0.47
Iyanla advises a transgender man in Los Angeles who is struggling to get his father to accept him.
10	10	"Fix My Love Life"	November 3, 2012	0.56
Iyanla shows single women how to pull back the curtain on their broken relationships, let go of the lies that are holding them back and start facing the truth about themselves and their dating patterns. What men want and what women need is also discussed.
11	11	"Fix My Cheating Husband"	November 10, 2012	0.95
Iyanla stops in Shreveport, Louisiana to help a couple in turmoil. A married pastor says that he has had affairs with women in his church and fathered a child with one of his mistresses. His wife says she is contemplating divorce and needs to make a decision.
12	12	"Fix My Celebrity Life"	November 13, 2012	0.91
Iyanla heads to Los Angeles to support actress Maia Campbell, best known for her TV role as Tiffany on In the House. Through the years, Maia has struggled with addiction and was publicly humiliated when shocking videos of her hit the internet.
13	13	"Fix My Blended Family"	November 24, 2012	0.65
In the season finale, a blended family with relationship issues get counsel from Iyanla.

=== Season 2 (2013) ===
No. overall	No. in season	Title	Original release date	U.S. viewers (millions)
14	1	"Fix My Rap Star Life"	April 13, 2013	1.41
Iyanla travels to DMX's hometown of Yonkers, New York. Things go awry as DMX's emotions run high and his temper takes over. She also sits down with DMX’s 19-year-old son, Xavier and his estranged wife, Tashera.
15	2	"Fix My Celebrity Ex-Spouse"	April 20, 2013	0.98
Iyanla works with former Real Housewives of Atlanta star Sheree Whitfield on her relationship with her ex-husband, former NFL star Bob Whitfield. Iyanla sits down with the couple to talk about the role of co-parenting in spite of their contentious divorce.
16	3	"Fix My Diva Life"	April 27, 2013	0.80
Iyanla travels to Stockbridge, Georgia to help the family of popular radio personality "Sasha the Diva", who is caught in the middle of a rocky relationship between her 42-year-old husband of two-years, Kevin, and her 17-year-old son, Dominique.
17	4	"Fix My Broken Mother"	May 4, 2013	0.39
Iyanla travels to Birmingham, Alabama to visit daughters Kim and Annette, whose relationship with their mother Charlene is at a breaking point.
18	5	"Fix My Sexless Marriage"	May 11, 2013	0.52
Iyanla works with Tiffany and Nick, a couple from Knoxville, Tennessee who say that they are trapped in a sexless marriage.
19	6	"Fix My Overweight Family"	May 18, 2013	0.66
Iyanla works with members of the acclaimed gospel group The Anointed Pace Sisters who are all fighting the same lifelong battle with weight.

=== Season 3 (2013) ===
No. overall	No. in season	Title	Original release date	US viewers (millions)
20	1	"Fix My R&B Family"	July 27, 2013	0.81
Iyanla travels to Atlanta, Georgia to help mend the volatile relationship between R&B recording artist and reality TV star Syleena Johnson and her mother.
21	2	"Fix My Full House"	August 3, 2013	0.77
Iyanla supports fourteen family members living in chaos and pain under one roof.
22	3	"Fix My Raging Spouse"	August 10, 2013	0.43
Iyanla travels to Miami to counsel a couple on the brink of divorce and their two daughters caught in the middle.
23	4	"Fix My Hoop Star Life"	August 17, 2013	0.57
Iyanla travels to Atlanta to support retired WNBA professional basketball player Chamique Holdsclaw, as she struggles with personal demons.
24	5	"Fix My Suburban Lie"	August 24, 2013	0.67
Iyanla helps parents Traci and Andre, both overwhelmed by disappointment in the life choices of their two adult children.
25	6	"Fix My Football Star Life"	November 2, 2013	0.97
Iyanla supports NFL star Terrell Owens as he works through a personal crisis.
26	7	"Fix My Secret Addiction"	November 9, 2013	0.83
Iyanla counsels a 28-year-old meth addict.
27	8	"Fix My Abusive Marriage"	November 16, 2013	0.75
Iyanla travels to Dallas to help a wife as she confronts her abusive husband.
28	9	"Fix My Dysfunctional Sisterhood"	November 23, 2013	0.73
Iyanla provides support as two San Antonio sisters work through a feud that began years earlier.
29	10	"Fix My Fractured Family"	November 30, 2013	0.73
Iyanla counsels a couple with three children, as they work on their troubled marriage.
30	11	"Fix My Secret Affair"	December 7, 2013	0.63
Iyanla travels to Detroit to support a married couple who are dealing with dishonesty and infidelity.
31	12	"Fix My Fatherless Family"	December 14, 2013	0.73
Iyanla helps two brothers to confront their absentee father, who they claim hid a secret for nearly 40 years.

=== Season 4 (2014) ===
No. overall	No. in season	Title	Original release date	U.S. viewers (millions)
32	1	"Fix My Celebrity Parenting Nightmare"	May 10, 2014	0.62
Iyanla helps the stars of Love & Hip Hop to co-parent respectfully with one another.
33	2	"Fix My 600-Pound Secret"	May 17, 2014	N/A
Iyanla counsels a 600 lb. woman as she attempts to leave her bed for the first time in years.
34	3	"Fix My Toxic Family Business"	May 24, 2014	0.56
Iyanla supports sisters as they address their dysfunctional relationship.
35	4	"Fix My Freeloading Family"	May 31, 2014	N/A
Iyanla provides guidance for an overcrowded family household.
36	5	"Fix My Double Life"	June 7, 2014	0.62
Iyanla works with a cheating husband, who has led a double life for twenty years, and helps him come to terms with his family.
37	6	"Fix My Angry Father"	June 14, 2014	N/A
Iyanla provides support for a father with anger and alcohol problems.
38	7	"Fix My Family Love Triangle"	June 21, 2014	N/A
Iyanla helps a woman and her mother-in-law see eye to eye.
39	8	"Fix My Headline-Making Mistake"	June 28, 2014	0.67
Iyanla counsels a family that is devastated after a husband's affair.
40	9	"Special Report: Healing in Ferguson"	August 26, 2014	N/A
Iyanla takes a trip to Ferguson, Missouri to empower citizens and help them formulate a plan for peace and healing in the wake of the shooting death of Michael Brown.
41	10	"Fix My Father With 34 Children, Part 1"	September 6, 2014	0.75
Iyanla Vanzant provides support for a 44-year-old video producer, Jay, who has fathered 34 children with 17 different women, in addition to adopting 9 other children.
42	11	"Fix My Father With 34 Children, Part 2"	September 13, 2014	0.86
Iyanla meets with Jay’s mother, sisters and some of the mothers of Jay’s children. Then, she connects with some of Jay's adult children.
43	12	"Fix My Father With 34 Children, Part 3"	September 20, 2014	1.15
Iyanla brings Jay together with a few of the mothers, who confront him on the mixed messages he's been sending all of them. Next, Jay meets with his son and father.
44	13	"Fix My Father With 34 Children: Follow-Up Special"	September 27, 2014	0.74
Iyanla hosts a follow-up special to her "mega-fix" by tackling the issue of wounded women settling for wounded men.
45	14	"Fix My Father With 34 Children: Jay Returns"	October 4, 2014	N/A
In Part 2 of a follow-up special, Iyanla meets with Jay and moderates an in-studio discussion with a group of men about love, infidelity and the responsibilities of being a father.
46	15	"Fix My Father With 34 Children: Jay Returns, The Reaction"	October 11, 2014	0.65
Iyanla continues an in-studio discussion with a group of men about love, infidelity and the responsibilities of being a father.
47	16	"Fix My Father With 34 Children: Jay Returns, Season Finale"	October 18, 2014	N/A
Iyanla continues an in-studio discussion with a group of men about love, infidelity and the responsibilities of being a father.

=== Season 5 (2015) ===
No. overall	No. in season	Title	Original release date	U.S. viewers (millions)
48	1	"Iyanla Exclusive: Karrueche Tran"	March 28, 2015	0.72
Iyanla sits down with Chris Brown's ex-girlfriend Karrueche Tran, following her recent, high-profile breakup with the singer.
49	2	"Fix My Secret Life As A Gay Pastor, Part 1"	September 19, 2015	0.78
Iyanla travels to Louisville, Kentucky to work with two pastors in crisis, who are hiding their true lives as gay men from their families and congregations.
50	3	"Fix My Secret Life As A Gay Pastor, Part 2"	September 26, 2015	0.81
Iyanla provides counsel for gay pastors Derek and Mitchell and encourages them to support one another as they reveal their truths.
51	4	"Fix My Secret Life As A Gay Pastor, Part 3"	October 3, 2015	1.09
Iyanla supports two pastors in crisis, as they deliver their ultimate confession.
52	5	"Fix My Toxic Obsession"	October 10, 2015	1.00
Iyanla helps a former model whose dangerous beauty routines put her health and relationships at risk.
53	6	"Fix My Dependent Sister"	October 17, 2015	0.82
Iyanla helps two co-dependent sisters, who are suffering from the effects of addiction.
54	7	"Fix My Delinquent Daughter"	October 24, 2015	0.70
Iyanla travels to Chicago to provides support for a grandmother who is raising her grandson because of her daughter’s irresponsible behavior.
55	8	"Fix My Out of Control Family"	October 31, 2015	0.72
Iyanla provides counsel for a family in Georgia struggling with a history of violence toward women, by women.
56	9	"Fix My Fall From Olympic Grace"	November 7, 2015	0.89
Iyanla supports Olympic figure skater Debi Thomas, who now lives in a trailer with a partner struggling with addiction.

=== Season 6 (2016) ===
No. overall	No. in season	Title	Original release date	U.S. viewers (millions)
57	1	"House of Healing – The Myth of The Angry Black Woman, Part 1"	September 10, 2016	0.67
Iyanla invites eight women, who have all been labeled as "Angry Black Women", into a "House of Healing". Iyanla sets out to prove that this stereotype is untrue and dangerous.
58	2	"House of Healing – The Myth of The Angry Black Woman, Part 2"	September 17, 2016	0.65
Iyanla supports the women of the "House of Healing" as they attempt to release the pain and hurt that they've carried with them throughout their lives.
59	3	"House of Healing – The Myth of The Angry Black Woman, Part 3"	September 24, 2016	0.55
Iyanla counsels the women of the "House of Healing", as they reveal the truth behind their inner pain.
60	4	"House of Healing – The Myth of The Angry Black Woman, Part 4"	October 1, 2016	0.58
The women prepare to leave the House of Healing and return to their normal lives.
61	5	"Fix My Broken Family, Part 1"	October 8, 2016	0.47
Iyanla helps to heal the Henry family, who are in crisis.
62	6	"Fix My Broken Family, Part 2"	October 15, 2016	0.55
Iyanla digs deeper into the roots of the Henry family's issues.
63	7	"Lotto Drama"	October 22, 2016	0.78
Iyanla works with a mother of four whose life is in shambles after winning the lottery.
64	8	"House of Healing: Fix a Black Man’s Heart, Part 1"	October 29, 2016	0.70
Iyanla invites six men into a House of Healing to help fix the black man's heart.
65	9	"House of Healing: Fix a Black Man’s Heart, Part 2"	November 5, 2016	0.62
Iyanla works with the men to help them learn to stand in integrity and author Dr. Steve Perry moderates a discussion on fatherhood.
66	10	"House of Healing: Fix a Black Man's Heart, Part 3"	November 12, 2016	0.66
One man faces a difficult decision at the House of Healing and actor Louis Gossett Jr. speaks at the graduation ceremony.

=== Season 7 (2017) ===
No. overall	No. in season	Title	Original release date	U.S. viewers (millions)
67	1	"Broken Reality: Neffe & Soullow (Part 1)"	April 15, 2017	0.86
Iyanla tries to heal the toxic marriage of former reality stars Neffe and Soullow.
68	2	"Broken Reality: Neffe & Soullow (Part 2)"	April 22, 2017	0.92
Iyanla uncovers the baggage of former reality stars Neffe and Soullow, as they work on healing their broken marriage.
69	3	"Growing Up Jackson"	April 29, 2017	0.76
Iyanla provides counsel for Taryll Jackson and his girlfriend of 10 years, who have been struggling for most of their relationship.
70	4	"Family Of Lies (Part 1)"	May 6, 2017	0.72
Iyanla supports six sisters trying to heal their family after 19 years of disconnection.
71	5	"Family Of Lies (Part 2)"	May 13, 2017	0.78
Iyanla continues to counsel a family who has been estranged for 19 years, as the matriarch reveals her history of sexual abuse and addiction.
72	6	"Family Of Lies (Part 3)"	May 20, 2017	0.77
Iyanla's healing process is threatened when the family matriarch contemplates abandoning her daughters again.
73	7	"Broken Reality: Laura Govan"	May 27, 2017	0.74
Laura Govan, former reality star of Basketball Wives, works with Iyanla to shed the volatile persona she has created on television.
74	8	"Surviving The Pulse Nightclub Mass Shooting"	June 3, 2017	0.42
Iyanla counsels six survivors of the mass shooting at Pulse nightclub in Orlando, Florida to work through the grieving process.
75	9	"Rapper’s Remorse"	September 30, 2017	0.59
Iyanla provides support for Turk, of Hot Boys fame, and his wife Erica, who are struggling to save their marriage from Turk's paranoia.
76	10	"Childhood Rape: Male Survivors (Part 1)"	October 7, 2017	0.53
Iyanla provides counsel for five men who were victims of childhood sexual abuse.
77	11	"Childhood Rape: Male Survivors (Part 2)"	October 14, 2017	0.44
Iyanla continues to support men who were victims of childhood sexual abuse by bringing in outside support
78	12	"Beyond Repair: Marriage in Crisis (Part 1)"	October 21, 2017	0.49
Iyanla tries to bring healing to three couples with troubled marriages.
79	13	"Beyond Repair: Marriage in Crisis (Part 2)"	October 28, 2017	0.62
Iyanla continues to work with couples whose marriages are in critical condition. Dwight faces a painful reality with Marcia, La'Gena tries to understand the root of Cornelius' infidelity, and Lamar insults the nonconfrontational Vakhara.
80	14	"Beyond Repair: Marriage in Crisis (Part 3)"	November 4, 2017	0.59
As Iyanla continues to help three couples in crisis, Lamar's refusal to cooperate threatens to derail the couple's journey. The other couples must decide whether or not to stay in their marriages.
81	15	"Of Murders and Men (Part 1)"	November 11, 2017	0.44
Four convicted murderers are unable to find solace outside the prison walls. Iyanla attempts to find the root cause of their crimes, the unhealed wounds that stop them from living.
82	16	"Of Murders and Men (Part 2)"	November 18, 2017	0.42
Iyanla continues to support four ex-cons trying to face the realities of life after prison, especially Willie who insists a DNA test will prove that he is not the father of his son.

=== Season 8 (2018) ===
No. overall	No. in season	Title	Original release date	U.S. viewers (millions)
83	1	"Kidnapped at Birth"	March 3, 2018	0.68
Iyanla provides support for Kamiyah Mobley, who was kidnapped at birth and raised by her kidnapper.
84	2	"Addicted to Fame: Mickey 'Memphitz' Wright"	March 10, 2018	0.47
Iyanla provides counsel for Mickey "Memphitz" Wright, a former top hip-hop executive who turned to drugs when he lost everything.
85	3	"Crack Addiction, Abandonment, 7 Broken Boys (Part 1)"	March 10, 2018	0.54
Iyanla works with the Mitchell brothers to uncover decades of pain among the siblings.
86	4	"Crack Addiction, Abandonment, 7 Broken Boys (Part 2)"	March 17, 2018	0.69
Iyanla continues to counsel the Mitchell brothers and their father. She also invites their mother and half-sister to the house, to find out how a mother of eight can abandon her children.
87	5	"Crack Addiction, Abandonment, 7 Broken Boys (Part 3)"	March 24, 2018	0.69
Iyanla asks the Mitchell family's mother, Leronda, to own her role in abandoning her children because of her crack addiction. Then, Iyanla prepares the brothers to re-enter the world as new men and gather in front of their parents for one final clearing conversation.
88	6	"Broken Reality: Trina Braxton"	March 31, 2018	0.60
Iyanla provides support to Trina Braxton, who wants help navigating her ex-husband's relationship with her son, but as they begin their work, disturbing family pathologies emerge.
89	7	"Sisters With Secrets"	April 7, 2018	0.58
Iyanla works with Jackie, who wants a relationship with her first-born daughter, and provides counsel to her when her sister leads her into a fit of rage.
90	8	"Broken Reality: Hazel-E"	April 14, 2018	0.75
Iyanla supports former "Love & Hip Hop" star, Hazel-E, as she faces the childhood trauma that helped create her current image and moves past it to use her voice for good.
91	9	"Sex Workers: Addicted to the Struggle"	April 21, 2018	0.57
Iyanla supports two sex workers, as she tries to help them get past their addiction to the street.
92	10	"Witness to a Killing: Philando’s Fiancée"	April 28, 2018	0.46
Philando Castile was killed by a police officer during a routine traffic stop. With the help of Trayvon Martin's mother, Iyanla works with Philando's fiancée Diamond Reynolds to heal her pain and move forward.
93	11	"The Return of Neffe & Soullow"	August 11, 2018	0.48
Neffeteria "Neffe" Pugh and Shelby "Soullow" Lowery return to Iyanla for a second attempt at healing their marriage.
94	12	"6 Kids, 5 Baby Daddies & No Clue"	August 18, 2018	0.54
Iyanla counsels Nakeda, who has six children by five different men, and her mother Illysha is raising five of them.
95	13	"3 Daughters, 1 Dead Son & A Million Secrets"	August 25, 2018	0.60
Iyanla works with Keshia, who shuts down emotionally after finding out that her dying son molested her youngest daughter.
96	14	"Broken Housewives of Reality TV"	September 1, 2018	0.55
The Real Housewives of Potomac star, Charrisse Jackson-Jordan, and Second Wives Club star, Veronika Obeng, work with Iyanla to heal from their public divorces.
97	15	"Basketball Lies: Brandi & Jason Maxiell"	September 8, 2018	0.67
Former NBA star Jason Maxiell and his wife Brandi sit down with Iyanla to determine if they should rebuild their toxic relationship after years of him being unfaithful to her.
98	16	"Female Felons: Healing is the New Black (Part 1)"	September 15, 2018	0.61
Iyanla provides support for Matilda, who served 17 years in prison, as a long buried secret gets unearthed.
99	17	"Female Felons: Healing is the New Black (Part 2)"	September 22, 2018	0.57
When Matilda admits that she thought she was going to get away with everything, both her prison daughters and biological daughters weigh in.
100	18	"Broken Reality: Malorie & Cynthia Bailey"	September 29, 2018	0.71
Iyanla works with Malorie and Cynthia Bailey from The Real Housewives of Atlanta to deal with Malorie's identity crisis.
101	19	"A Family's Curse: Abuse, Lies & Blackmail"	October 6, 2018	0.51
Iyanla works with a woman who was abused by her grandfather at six years old and forced by her mother to cover it up.
102	20	"Monifah: Fame Over Family"	October 13, 2018	0.57
Iyanla supports singer-songwriter Monifah as she tries to repair her relationship with her daughter.

=== Season 9 (2019) ===
No. overall	No. in season	Title	Original release date	U.S. viewers (millions)
103	1	"Reality Rehab"	January 12, 2019	0.53
Iyanla provides support to former reality stars Althea (Love & Hip Hop), Dutchess (Black Ink Crew) and Minyon (Bridezillas) as they work on their addiction to fame.
104	2	"And the Lie Detector Says... (Part 1)"	January 19, 2019	0.60
Iyanla counsels three sisters who have spent years wondering if their father molested them, after their mother has supported the accusation since they were toddlers.
105	3	"And the Lie Detector Says... (Part 2)"	January 26, 2019	0.76
Iyanla continues supporting three sisters as the lie detector test reveals whether the accusation against their father is true.
106	4	"Secret Curse: Like Mother, Like Daughter"	February 2, 2019	0.58
Iyanla provides support for a mother and daughter whose childhood traumas have resulted in self-hatred.
107	5	"My Father Killed My Mother"	February 9, 2019	0.49
Iyanla works with Shane to find forgiveness for his Dad, who killed his mother when Shane was six years old.
108	6	"Engaged & Enraged: A Couple in Crisis"	February 23, 2019	0.52
Iyanla tries to support an engaged couple dealing with control and resentment issues.
109	7	"Raised By Monsters (Part 1)"	March 2, 2019	0.56
Iyanla provides counsel for five brothers and sisters, who grew up being abused in foster care after being abandoned by their crack-addicted mother.
110	8	"Raised By Monsters (Part 2)"	March 9, 2019	0.67
Iyanla invites five siblings back to face their mother, who abandoned them as children.
111	9	"The Bad Girl of Gospel (Part 1)"	March 16, 2019	0.55
Iyanla works with Le'Andria Johnson, who has lost her way, as she battles with an addiction to alcohol.
112	10	"The Bad Girl of Gospel (Part 2)"	March 23, 2019	0.60
Iyanla continues to support Le'Andria Johnson, as her career and her life are jeopardized by her struggle with alcohol.
113	11	"Unfinished Business: The Mitchell Family (Part 1)"	June 1, 2019	0.38
The Mitchell family returns for Iyanla's help, as bad behavior has resurfaced in some family members.
114	12	"Unfinished Business: The Mitchell Family (Part 2)"	June 8, 2019	0.48
Iyanla attempts to mend the broken Mitchell family by healing them individually first.
115	13	"Unfinished Business: The Mitchell Family (Part 3)"	June 15, 2019	0.44
Iyanla counsels each family member as they face their core issues of mistrust.
116	14	"Strangled By Love: Demetrius & RaAnne"	June 22, 2019	0.33
RaAnne has been wearing the pants in her marriage with Demetrius for the past 14 years, and Iyanla supports the couple as they try to rekindle their love and friendship.
117	15	"Mother Doesn't Know Best"	June 29, 2019	0.43
When a mother cannot get along with her daughter-in-law after moving in with her daughter two years ago, Iyanla supports the family to reconnect with the truth.
118	16	"DNA Dysfunction: Are You My Father? (Part 1)"	July 6, 2019	0.48
After abandoning his three sons nearly 30 years ago, Neil is counselled by Iyanla as he attempts to form a relationship with them today.
119	17	"DNA Dysfunction: Are You My Father? (Part 2)"	July 13, 2019	0.52
Iyanla helps three brothers heal the wounds left when their drug-addicted father abandoned them, and DNA results determine the fate of their relationship with their father.
120	18	"Born in Prison: Lil' Karla Beverly"	July 20, 2019	0.44
Iyanla sits down with Lil' Karla's family, who are frustrated with her bad behaviour. However, Iyanla discovers that the root of the problem lies within the family history.
121	19	"Pride vs. Prejudice (Part 1)"	July 27, 2019	0.46
A man is caught in the middle of a conflict between his black wife and his white, German mother. The mother's five page letter of resentments is the catalyst for a visit with Iyanla.
122	20	"Pride vs. Prejudice (Part 2)"	August 3, 2019	0.46
Iyanla continues to support Christian and Remeesha, as they try to resolve conflicts with Christian's mother, Rita, who continues to try to fight to be right.

=== Season 10 (2020-21) ===
No. overall	No. in season	Title	Original release date	U.S. viewers (millions)
123	1	"Shay Johnson: 'BLEEP Your Process!'"	October 31, 2020	0.37
Reality star Shay Johnson asks for Iyanla's help to mend her broken relationship with her mother and brothers. But the work required may be more than Shay bargained for.
124	2	"House of Chaos"	November 7, 2020	0.23
Iyanla supports Christy, who is looking for peace with her children so she can spend more time with her new husband. When the family opens up, it becomes apparent that her kids' behaviours are direct consequences of her own actions.
125	3	"The Masks We Wear"	November 14, 2020	0.31
Iyanla helps Comedian Luenell as the humor she revels in has now turned to anger and a tumultuous relationship with her daughter, after years of failing to address past traumas.
126	4	"Biological Mama Drama"	November 21, 2020	0.32
After his biological mother became pregnant at the age of 12, Terrell Brown was adopted by two loving parents when he was just two weeks old. Through the help of a recent DNA test, Terrell met his mother and five sisters for the very first time. Terrell is a chronic people pleaser and is now in a tug of war between his two mothers.
127	5	"LisaRaye McCoy: 3 Generations, 1 Family Breakdown"	November 28, 2020	0.46
Iyanla provides counsel for LisaRaye McCoy, who was catapulted into the spotlight with her breakout role as Diamond in Player's Club soon after moving from Chicago to LA. LisaRaye has handled her public life with grace, but her family life is chaos. This is a story of three generations of women who feel disrespected and disconnected.
128	6	"Home Invasion Horror Story"	December 5, 2020	0.38
A violent home invasion during a child's birthday party left two people dead and a family destroyed. Fourteen years later, two sisters try to repair the emotional wounds from this day that they have never fully processed.
129	7	"All Aboard the Trauma Train"	December 12, 2020	0.38
Iyanla provides support to a multi-generational family, who are in breakdown after the matriarch dies. At the center of the chaos is Yolanda, whose actions have terrorized everyone and while she claims to seek change, Yolanda's resistance to the process threatens the family's healing.
130	8	"When Dirty Laundry Goes Viral"	December 19, 2020	0.35
Iyanla helps Marc after his life is turned upside down when his daughter posts a video of him ranting about being the sole provider in his household. When the video goes viral, the entire family is in turmoil and Marc is terrified that this damage cannot be undone.
131	9	"LisaRaye McCoy: Queen of De-Nial"	April 10, 2021	0.30
Actress LisaRaye McCoy returns to complete the work started during her first visit with Iyanla. Rather than healing the relationships with her mother and daughter, this time she is looking to address the breakdown within herself.
132	10	"Marriage Is Not Our Business"	April 17, 2021	0.29
Iyanla supports a couple who co-own a business together and share 11 children. They find themselves at a crisis point in their marriage when he has one foot out the door and she is still hopeful that their union can be saved.
133	11	"Dirty Laundry and Unfinished Business"	April 24, 2021	0.30
The Giles family returns for support from Iyanla with more unfinished business. This time, Marc's eldest son joins to resolve issues his dad, his youngest daughter confronts the grandmother, and his youngest son makes a run for it.
134	12	"Taking Care of Business, Losing in Love"	May 1, 2021	0.30
Four female friends who are successful in their careers seek Iyanla's support to figure out why their romantic relationships always seem to fail. They recognize that old wounds from the past are creating blocks for the future.
135	13	"99 Problems and My Mom Is One"	May 8, 2021	N/A
A family with 2 adult children feels disconnected and frustrated when all living together under one roof. Although the surface issue is the lack of space, the real problem is a generational history of alcohol abuse.
136	14	"Open Letter to All Black Men"	May 15, 2021	N/A
A widowed father struggles to stop his two sons' dangerous behavior. Their actions in response to grieving their mother's death threaten to send them straight down the prison pipeline.

=== Specials ===
No.	Title	Original release date	US viewers (millions)
SP1	"Iyanla: Back in Brooklyn!"	February 16, 2019	0.44
Iyanla returns to her hometown of Brooklyn, New York on the final stop of her Get Over It tour, taking a theatre full of fans through her personal story while visiting the locations that shaped her life.
SP2	"Farewell Special- Part 1"	May 22, 2021	N/A
SP3	"Farewell Special- Part 2"	May 22, 2021	N/A

== Reception ==
Iyanla, Fix My Life debuted to largely positive reviews by critics. As writer and columnist Nancy Colasurdo proclaimed, Fix My Life is "what "reality" television can be. It’s what it should be. Reaching for our best selves. Focusing on what can make our lives meaningful. Learning from others’ mistakes because they are so often our own. Having hard conversations." Colasurdo further recognizes Vanzant's gutsy, honest approach to handling difficult situations.

Critic Jon Caramanica proposes that Vanzant possesses "a mystical air but with a deeply grounded approach. She speaks in a soothing, encouraging voice, makes phenomenal eye contact and has an evident distaste for polish. Iyanla: Fix My Life is Intervention and daytime talk distilled to core principles. Much of the show is given over to long, hard conversations, shot up close, a tactic of discomfort." He goes on to critique that "her truth-teller presentation can go overboard at times: In a later episode, she literally ties family members together with string to illustrate how bonds work, then uses scissors to emphasize a point about abandonment. But mostly, it’s bracing watching her poke holes in the delusions of her charges."

=== Ratings ===
Zap2it reported that "the premiere of the new original series Iyanla: Fix My Life with life coach Iyanla Vanzant scored 1.18 W25-54 rating and 1,136,000 million viewers ranking No.2 in its time period in W25-54 among all ad-supported cable networks. The series posted triple digit growth (+808% W25-54, +952% total viewers) versus year ago numbers and built in the half hour, growing +5%. The premiere, which featured Basketball Wives star Evelyn Lozada, continued ratings momentum with part two scoring 1.73 W25-54 rating and 1,590,000 million total viewers, ranking No,3 in its time period among ad-supported cable in W25-54 and W18-49, posting quadruple digit growth (+1231% W25-54, +1506% total viewers) versus year ago numbers. The Sunday episode also ranked No.1 in the time slot across all broadcast and cable with African-American W25-54 (9.66) and W18-49 (9.12)."

== Awards and nominations ==
Year	Award	Category	Result
2014	45th NAACP Image Awards	Outstanding Reality Series	Won
2014	Gracie Awards	Outstanding Host – Entertainment / Information	Won
2014	21st Annual NAMIC Vision Awards	Reality Show- Social Issues	Nominated
2015	46th NAACP Image Awards	Outstanding Reality Series	Won
2015	Gracie Awards	Outstanding Lifestyle / Health Program	Won
2016	47th NAACP Image Awards	Outstanding Reality Series / Reality Competition Series	Nominated
2016	Gracie Awards	Outstanding Non-Fiction or Reality Show	Won
2017	48th NAACP Image Awards	Outstanding Reality Program / Reality Competition Series	Won
2018	49th NAACP Image Awards	Outstanding Reality Program / Reality Competition Series	Nominated
2019	50th NAACP Image Awards	Outstanding Reality Program/ Reality Competition Series	Won
2019	50th NAACP Image Awards	Outstanding Host in a Reality / Reality Competition, Game Show or Variety (Series or Special) – Individual or Ensemble	Nominated
2020	51st NAACP Image Awards	Outstanding Reality Program/ Reality Competition Series	Nominated
2020	51st NAACP Image Awards	Outstanding Host in a Reality / Reality Competition, Game Show or Variety (Series or Special) – Individual or Ensemble	Nominated
2021	52nd NAACP Image Awards	Outstanding Reality Program, Reality Competition or Game Show (Series)	Nominated
2021	52nd NAACP Image Awards	Outstanding Host in a Reality / Reality Competition, Game Show or Variety (Series or Special) – Individual or Ensemble	Nominated
