= Roland Lemar =

American politician (born 1976)

Member of the Connecticut House of Representatives from the 96th district
- Incumbent
- Assumed office January 5, 2011
- Preceded by: Cameron Staples

Personal details
- Born: May 17, 1976 (age 50) Westerly, Rhode Island, U.S.
- Party: Democratic
- Education: University of Massachusetts Amherst

Roland Lemar (born May 17, 1976) is an American politician who has served in the Connecticut House of Representatives from the 96th district since 2011.
