= Quentin Williams =

American politician (1983–2023)

Member of the Connecticut House of Representatives from the 100th district
- In office January 9, 2019 – January 5, 2023
- Preceded by: Matt Lesser
- Succeeded by: Kai Belton

Personal details
- Born: Quentin W. Phipps; November 24, 1983 Middletown, Connecticut, U.S.
- Died: January 5, 2023 (aged 39) Cromwell, Connecticut, U.S.
- Party: Democratic
- Spouse: Carrissa Phillippe
- Education: Bryant University (BS); Villanova University (MPA)

Quentin S. "Q" Williams (né Phipps; November 24, 1983 – January 5, 2023) was an American politician of the Democratic Party. He was a member of the Connecticut House of Representatives, representing the 100th district in Middlesex County from 2019 until his death in 2023.

== Career ==
In 2007, he was elected to the Middletown, Connecticut Planning & Zoning Commission. Williams was unanimously made chair of the commission two years later. Williams was elected as Middletown Treasurer in 2011 and re-elected in 2015.

He was the director of policy and advocacy for Excellence Community Schools, a charter school system in Stamford, Connecticut.

Williams was elected to the Connecticut House of Representatives in 2018 winning 61% of the vote over 39% for Republican candidate Anthony Gennaro. He was re-elected in 2020 and 2022. During the legislature's 2021–22 session, he co-chaired the committees on aging and housing. At the start of the 2023–24 session, he was set to co-chair the labor committee. Williams was noted for his focus on housing issues. In 2022, he authored a bill, which was successfully passed into law, leading to the formation of commissions to mediate disputes between tenants and renters in all Connecticut municipalities with a population of over 25,000.

== Personal life ==
Born Quentin Phipps, he changed his surname to Williams, his mother's last name, in 2022. Williams was a graduate of Bryant University, where he studied business, and Villanova University, where he received a master's degree in public administration. At the time of his death, he was enrolled at the Harvard Kennedy School.

Williams lived in Middletown with his wife, the former Carrissa Phillippe. He was a member of the Cross Street Zion AME Church in Middletown.

=== Death ===
On January 4, 2023, Williams was sworn in for his third term in the legislature and attended inaugural festivities for reelected governor Ned Lamont in Hartford that evening. At 12:48 a.m. on January 5, Williams was driving southbound on Connecticut Route 9 in Cromwell when a northbound vehicle entered the lane and struck his car head-on. Williams and the northbound driver both died at the scene. Quentin Williams was 39 years old. Williams was traveling at an excessive rate of speed and both he and the other driver were above the legal limit for blood alcohol content.

== Electoral history ==
2011 Middletown City Treasurer Democratic primary election
Party	Candidate	Votes	%
Democratic	Quentin W. Phipps	1,585	68.61
Democratic	J. Tina Massatta Raffa	725	31.39
Total votes		2,310	100.00

2011 Middletown City Treasurer election
Party	Candidate	Votes	%
Democratic	Quentin W. Phipps	4,612	55.38
Republican	Jonathan Pulino	3,263	39.18
Petitioning Candidate	J. Tina Massatta Raffa	453	5.44
Total votes		8,328	100.00

2015 Middletown City Treasurer election
Party	Candidate	Votes	%
Democratic	Quentin Phipps	5,449	65.52
Republican	Emmakristina Sveen	2,868	34.48
Total votes		8,317	100.00

2018 Connecticut House of Representatives election, District 100
Party	Candidate	Votes	%
Democratic	Quentin W. Phipps	5,033	55.86
Working Families	Quentin W. Phipps	443	4.92
Total	Quentin W. Phipps	5,476	60.78
Republican	Anthony Gennaro	3,534	39.22
Total votes		9,010	100.00

2020 Connecticut House of Representatives election, District 100
Party	Candidate	Votes	%
Democratic	Quentin Phipps	6,892	60.58
Working Families	Quentin Phipps	539	4.74
Total	Quentin Phipps	7,431	65.32
Republican	Tony Gennaro	3,945	34.68
Total votes		11,376	100.00

2022 Connecticut House of Representatives election, District 100
Party	Candidate	Votes	%
Democratic	Quentin S. Williams	5,291	89.97
Working Families	Quentin S. Williams	590	10.03
Total	Quentin S. Williams	5,881	100.00
Total votes		5,881	100.00
