= Russell Morin =

American politician

Member of the Connecticut House of Representatives from the 28th district
- In office January 3, 2007 – January 6, 2021
- Preceded by: Paul Doyle
- Succeeded by: Amy Morrin Bello

Personal details
- Party: Democratic

Russell Morin is an American politician who served in the Connecticut House of Representatives from the 28th district from 2007 to 2021.
