= Steve Perry (educator) =

American private school activist

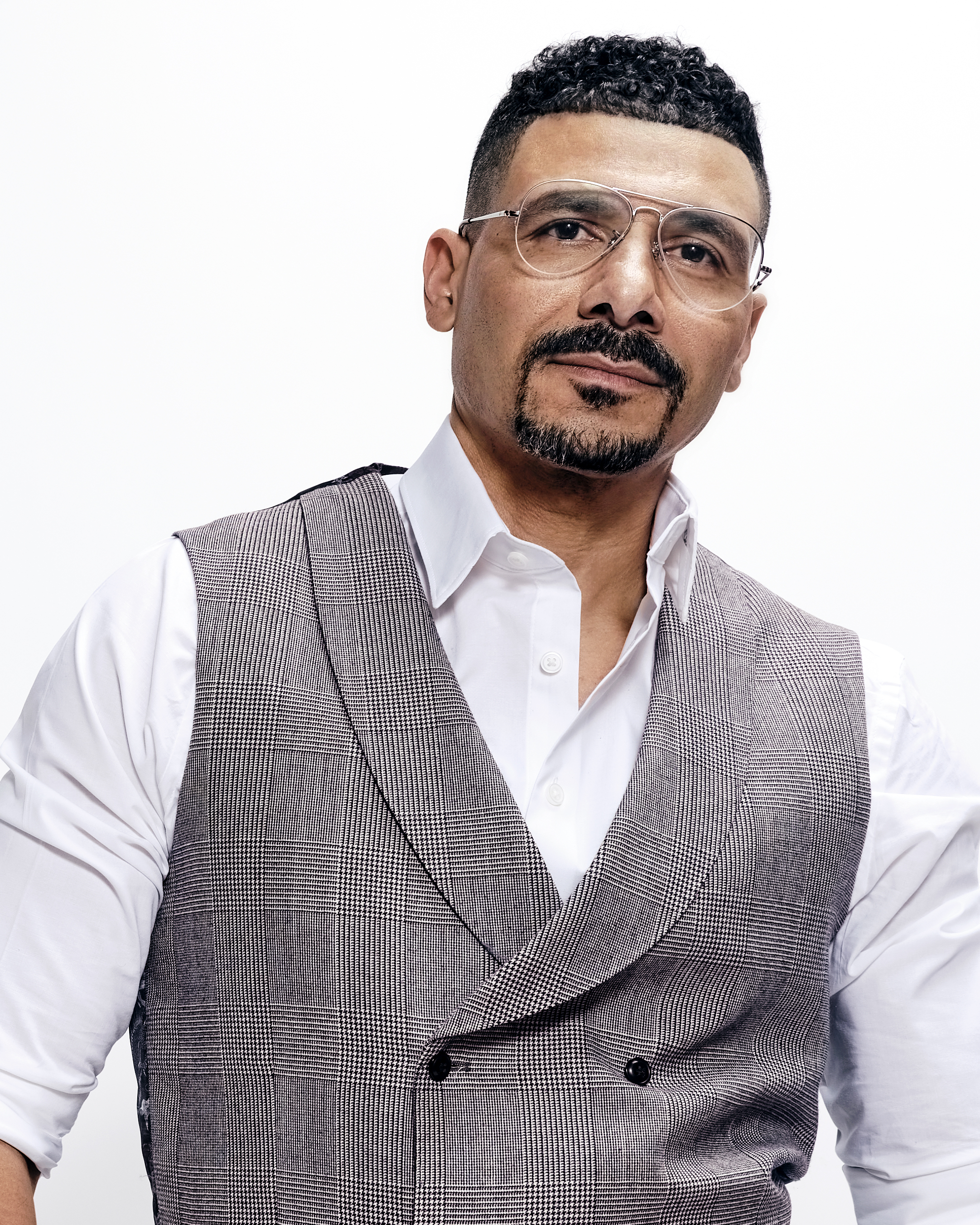
- Born: Steve David Perry; 1969 (age 56–57); Middletown, Connecticut
- Occupations: Author, educator, and TV personality
- Known for: Breakthrough With Dr. Steve Perry and Save My Son
- Website: www.drsteveperry.org

Steve David Perry (born 1969) is an American educator, author and TV personality. He became well known when CNN Black in America featured a story on him and the school he founded, Capital Preparatory School in Hartford, Connecticut. He is also known for appearing on Iyanla: Fix My Life.

Described as a "scorched-earth" school reformer and "vitriolic union-basher," Perry has previously hosted talk shows such as Breakthrough With Dr. Steve Perry and Save My Son. He has also worked as a columnist for Essence.

== Biography ==
Perry was raised in Middletown, Connecticut. His family is of mixed ancestry, Caucasian mother and African-American father. He received a masters in social work from the University of Pennsylvania School of Social Policy and Practice and a doctor of education from the University of Hartford.

In 1998, he ran unsuccessfully for the state legislature, winning 39% of the vote against incumbent Joseph Serra. That year he also founded ConnCAP at Capital Community College, a Connecticut collegiate awareness program.

In 2005, he founded his first school, Capital Prep Magnet School, Hartford, Connecticut, a magnet school under the Hartford Board of Education. In 2014, Perry stepped down from Capital Prep Hartford amid tensions with the Board of Education, tweeting "The only way to lose a fight is to stop fighting. All this did was piss me off. It’s so on. Strap up, there will be head injuries.” A state audit later found that Capital Prep Hartford, under Perry's leadership, had systematically violated admissions rules, admitting 116 students over a two year period around the lottery system in violation of state law.

In 2015, Perry's first charter school, Capital Prep Harbor School, opened in Bridgeport, Connecticut. Another school, Capital Prep Harlem School, was opened in 2016 in partnership with Diddy. A year later, Capital Prep Harbor Lower School in Bridgeport, Connecticut opened its doors In 2020, his fourth school campus opened in the Bronx, New York. It is the third school which was opened in partnership with Diddy. In 2023, Perry cut ties with Diddy amid sexual assault allegations, and in 2024 fourteen whistleblowers told The Cut (New York) that Perry's East Harlem school was "violent and dysfunctional."

In 2011, his book, Push Has Come to Shove, was published. In 2016, he contributed in Steve Harvey's book, Jump: Take the Leap of Faith to Achieve Your Life of Abundance. In 2017, his Capital Preparatory Charter Schools network received $1.35 million from the Charles Koch Foundation. Perry has been outspoken against teacher’s unions since the Koch Foundation contribution. In 2018, his talk show, Breakthrough With Dr. Steve Perry, started to air on Fox Stations and CBS network.

Perry was part of CNN's documentary Black in America. He has reported for Anderson Cooper 360 and American Morning through his reportage, Perry's Principles. He is also an education advisor to Oprah Winfrey.

== Books ==
- Perry, Steve (2006). Man Up! Nobody is Coming to Save Us
- Perry, Steve (2011). Push Has Come to Shove
