= Cameron Staples =

American politician (born 1958)

Member of the Connecticut House of Representatives from the 96th district
- In office January 6, 1993 – January 5, 2011
- Preceded by: Martin Looney
- Succeeded by: Roland Lemar

Personal details
- Born: March 25, 1958 (age 68) Salem, Massachusetts, U.S.
- Party: Democratic

Cameron Staples (born March 25, 1958) is an American politician who served in the Connecticut House of Representatives from the 96th district from 1993 to 2011.
