= David Scribner =

American politician (born 1957)

Member of the Connecticut House of Representatives from the 107th district
- In office March 25, 1999 – January 7, 2015
- Preceded by: B. Scott Santa-Maria
- Succeeded by: Stephen Harding

Liquor Control Commissioner of Connecticut
- In office January 7, 2015 – January 9, 2019
- Appointed by: Dannel Malloy

Personal details
- Born: July 15, 1957 (age 69) Brookfield, Connecticut, U.S.
- Party: Republican
- Education: Western Connecticut State University; Post University

David A. Scribner (born July 15, 1957) is an American former politician who served in the Connecticut House of Representatives from the 107th district from 1999 to 2015.

== Early life and professional career ==
Scribner was born on July 15, 1957 in Brookfield, Connecticut. He attended Post University and Western Connecticut State University.

Around August 1980, he joined Danbury Savings and Loan as a loan officer and branch manager. Over his three years with the institution, he managed branch operations, business development, wholesale lending and retail lending. In August 1983, he moved to Union Trust Company as vice president of Corporate and Correspondent Banking, holding the position until June 1994. Scribner later worked in mortgage lending as a senior loan officer with Northeast Mortgage and Home Mortgage Network. He also qualified as a notary public and justice of the peace.

Alongside his financial career, Scribner held leadership positions on community boards across western Connecticut. He served on the board of directors for the Brookfield Chamber of Commerce, the Brookfield Historical Society, the Regional Hospice of Western Connecticut and the Regional YMCA Executive Board of Directors. Scribner also served as president emeritus of the Brookfield Craft Center and joined both the Brookfield Jaycees and the Lions Club.

== Political career ==
Scribner entered state elected office on March 25, 1999 after winning a special election to the Connecticut House of Representatives to represent District 107, which covered parts of Brookfield, Bethel, and Newtown. He succeeded B. Scott Santa-Maria. Scribner secured re-election in 2000, 2002, 2004, 2006, 2008, 2010, 2012 and 2014.

During his sixteen years in the General Assembly, Scribner served on the Finance, Revenue and Bonding Committee, the Public Health Committee and as the ranking Republican member on the Transportation Committee since 2003. He also held leadership roles as Assistant Minority Leader and House Republican Whip. In known political endorsements, he supported Mitt Romney during the 2012 Republican presidential primaries.

In November 2014, Scribner won re-election to his seat by defeating Democratic opponent Dan Smolnik with 64.6 percent of the vote. On January 7, 2015, Scribner resigned from the Connecticut House of Representatives to accept an appointment by Governor Dannel Malloy to the Connecticut Liquor Control Commission. He was succeeded in the legislature by Stephen Harding following a special election in February 2015.
