= Ronald Napoli Jr. =

American politician from Connecticut

Member of the Connecticut House of Representatives from the 73rd district
- Incumbent
- Assumed office January 9, 2019
- Preceded by: Jeffrey Berger

Personal details
- Born: November 2, 1974 (age 51)
- Party: Democratic
- Education: Salve Regina University (BA); University of Bridgeport (MS)

Ronald A. Napoli Jr. (born November 2, 1974) is an American politician who serves in the Connecticut House of Representatives representing the 73rd district in New Haven County.

== Political career ==
=== Municipal elections ===
Napoli Jr. was first elected to the Waterbury Board of Aldermen in 2011 and won subsequent re-elections in 2013, 2015, and 2017. He also served as the board's President Pro Tempore.

=== 2018 state representative election ===
Napoli Jr. was elected in the general election on November 6, 2018, winning 57 percent of the vote over 43 percent of Republican candidate Steven Giacomi.
