= Raymond Kalinowski =

American politician (1942–2014)

Member of the Connecticut House of Representatives from the 100th district
- In office January 8, 2003 – January 7, 2009
- Preceded by: Theodore Raczka
- Succeeded by: Matt Lesser

Personal details
- Born: January 16, 1942 Middletown, Connecticut, U.S.
- Died: August 17, 2014 (aged 72) Durham, Connecticut, U.S.
- Party: Republican

Raymond Kalinowski (January 16, 1942 – August 17, 2014) was an American politician who served in the Connecticut House of Representatives from the 100th district from 2003 to 2009.

He died of cancer on August 17, 2014, in Durham, Connecticut, at age 72.
