= Richard Tulisano =

American politician (1939–2008)

Member of the Connecticut House of Representatives from the 29th district
- In office January 8, 1975 – January 3, 2001
- Preceded by: Thomas Kablik
- Succeeded by: Antonio Guerrera

Personal details
- Born: November 7, 1939 Hartford, Connecticut, U.S.
- Died: February 20, 2008 (aged 68) Hartford, Connecticut, U.S.
- Party: Democratic

Richard Tulisano (November 7, 1939 – February 20, 2008) was an American politician who served in the Connecticut House of Representatives from the 29th district from 1975 to 2001.

He died on February 20, 2008, in Hartford, Connecticut at age 68.
