= Connecticut's 11th State Senate district =

American legislative district

Senator
Martin Looney; D

Connecticut's 11th State Senate district elects one member of the Connecticut State Senate. It encompasses parts of Hamden and New Haven. It is currently represented by Democrat Martin Looney, who has served since 1993.

== Recent elections ==
2020 Connecticut State Senate election, District 11
Party	Candidate	Votes	%
Democratic	Martin Looney (incumbent)	27,336	74.70
Republican	Jameson White	8,462	23.12
Petitioning candidate	Alexander Taubes	795	2.17
Total votes		36,593	100.00
Democratic hold			

=== 2018 ===
2018 Connecticut State Senate election, District 11
Party	Candidate	Votes	%
Democratic	Martin Looney (incumbent)	23,787	77.9
Republican	Erin Reilly	6,758	22.1
Total votes		30,545	100.0
Democratic hold			

=== 2016 ===
2016 Connecticut State Senate election, District 11
Party	Candidate	Votes	%
Democratic	Martin Looney (incumbent)	26,153	100.0
Total votes		26,153	100.0
Democratic hold			

=== 2014 ===
2014 Connecticut State Senate election, District 11
Party	Candidate	Votes	%
Democratic	Martin Looney (incumbent)	19,793	100.0
Total votes		19,793	100.0
Democratic hold			

=== 2012 ===
2014 Connecticut State Senate election, District 11
Party	Candidate	Votes	%
Democratic	Martin Looney (incumbent)	28,689	100.0
Total votes		28,689	100.0
Democratic hold			
