= Matt Lesser =

American politician (born 1983)

Member of the Connecticut State Senate from the 9th district
- Incumbent
- Assumed office January 9, 2019
- Preceded by: Paul Doyle

Member of the Connecticut House of Representatives from the 100th district
- In office January 7, 2009 – January 9, 2019
- Preceded by: Raymond Kalinowski
- Succeeded by: Quentin Williams

Personal details
- Born: April 1983 (age 43) Washington, D.C., U.S.
- Party: Democratic
- Children: 2
- Education: Wesleyan University

Matthew L. Lesser (born 28 or 29 April 1983) is an American politician who represents the 9th district in the Connecticut State Senate. A member of the Democratic Party, he was first elected to the State House in 2008, and re-elected in 2010, 2012, 2014, and 2016. He won election to the state Senate from the 9th district in 2018, and was reelected in 2020 and 2022. Lesser unsuccessfully sought the Democratic nomination for Connecticut Secretary of the State in 2022.

== Early life ==
Lesser grew up in the Washington, D.C. area. His father once reported for The Washington Post. His mother is from Argentina.

== Career ==
=== Early years ===
As an undergraduate student at Wesleyan University in Middletown, Connecticut, Lesser was elected president of the College Democrats chapter and ran voter registration drives. He was elected as Chairman of the Middletown Planning and Zoning Commission.

=== State House ===
In May 2008, Lesser, then a student at Wesleyan University, was selected to run as the second youngest candidate for State Representative at the Democratic 100th District Convention. Connecticut Secretary of State Susan Bysiewicz, who once held the 100th District State representative seat, endorsed him. Lesser also received support from State Senator Thomas Gaffey and Middletown DTC Chairman Dan Russo. Lesser defeated three-term Republican incumbent Raymond Kalinowski. Lesser took a leave of absence from Wesleyan in the fall 2008 semester.

In the 2013 session of the state House, Lesser was a vice chair of the Government Administration and Elections Committee and a member of the Energy and Technology Committee. In 2015, he became co-chair of the Banking Committee. He also was a member of the member of the Insurance and Real Estate Committee.

While in the state House, Lesser sponsored a number of bills that were enacted into law, including Connecticut's first-in-the-nation Student Loan Bill of Rights; an act prohibiting fracking waste from being dumped in Connecticut, and updated workplace safety standards. He also pressed for a review of natural gas pipelines in Connecticut after the 2018 Merrimack Valley gas explosions in neighboring Massachusetts. In 2013, Lesser voted in favor of the gun control bill that passed in the wake of the Sandy Hook Elementary School massacre.

In 2012, Lesser was elected as one of the Connecticut Democratic Party's two delegates to the National Platform Committee ahead of the 2012 Democratic National Convention.

In 2017, Lesser considered running for Connecticut Secretary of the State in 2018 and formed an exploratory committee, but said he would only run if Denise W. Merrill did not seek election.

=== State Senate ===
In May 2018, Lesser announced a run for state senator from the 9th district, which includes Cromwell, Newington, Rocky Hill, and portions of Middletown and Wethersfield. He won the August 2018 primary against former state representative Antonio Guerrera. The general election featured some controversy when the campaign of Republican nominee, Ed Charamut, of Rocky Hill, sent out a mailer to voters attacking Lesser, featuring an altered image of Lesser clutching $100 bills; the mailer garnered national media attention and was denounced for its use of antisemitic tropes. Lesser won the general election in November, and was appointed Senate chairman of the Insurance and Real Estate Committee the following month. He was reelected in 2020 and 2022.

As a state senator, Lesser has written laws to guarantee mental health parity, expand access to epinephrine devices (such as EpiPens) in public venues, and to cap the cost of insulin at $25. In the 2019 legislative session, Lesser sponsored a health care reform effort to create a public health insurance option in the state of Connecticut (dubbed "the Connecticut Option") that ultimately failed amid opposition from health insurers.

Beginning in 2009, Lesser advocated for Connecticut to join the National Popular Vote Interstate Compact. The General Assembly passed the bill in 2018 (on a 73–71 vote in the House and 21–14 vote in the Senate).

During the COVID-19 pandemic, Lesser wrote a law expanding access to telehealth. In 2023, Lesser was one of several legislators and staff to test positive for COVID-19, prompting the Senate to implement a masking policy. He was absent from several votes while isolating.

In 2022, Lesser sought the Democratic nomination for Connecticut Secretary of the State in the 2022 election. At the Democratic Party of Connecticut state convention in May 2022, he ran against state Representative Stephanie Thomas of Norwalk, state Representative Hilda Santiago of Meriden, state Representative Josh Elliott of Hamden, and New Haven health director Maritza Bond. Lesser came in second, losing the party's endorsement to Thomas; although he qualified to run against Thomas in the primary, Lesser dropped out of the race and opted to seek reelection to the state Senate instead.

On January 14, 2024, an online petition initiated by Black community leaders criticized Lesser for withdrawing funding for CPREP. In 2023, Lesser opposed funding of Steve Perry's Capital Preparatory Charter School (CPREP) in Middletown; funding for the charter school was initially allocated by the Appropriations Committee, but was removed from the budget after eleventh-hour maneuvering on the last day of the 2023 legislative session. The decision was condemned by various Black community leaders, and criticized by the Connecticut NAACP and its Middlesex County chapter.

In March 2023, Lesser, a former co-chair of the Insurance and Real Estate Committee, questioned fellow Democrat and current Committee Co-Chair Kerry Szeps Wood for several hours in a filibuster intended to stall discussion on H.B. 6710, a bill to allow trade associations to offer certain health insurance plans to their members. The bill attracted bipartisan support as an effort to lower costs for small employers, but also opposition from patient advocates who feared that the plans permitted by the bill would destabilize insurance markets and possibly discriminate against policyholders with illnesses or disabilities. After Governor Ned Lamont's staff agreed to "mediate" issues raised by Lesser, he ended questioning and voted against the bill. In 2024, he supported expanded eligibility for HUSKY, the Connecticut Medicaid program. The same year, he sponsored legislation to bar the reporting of medical debt to credit reporting agencies; the bill passed the General Assembly and was signed into law by Lamont.

=== Activities outside the General Assembly ===
He was appointed executive director of the Cancer Support Community of Southern Connecticut (which serves New London, Middlesex, New Haven and Fairfield counties) in 2014. In 2015, Lesser was selected as a 2015–16 Marshall Memorial Fellow by the German Marshall Fund of the United States.

== Personal life ==
Lesser lives in Middletown's North End with his wife Sarah and their two children.

Lesser was diagnosed with testicular cancer in 2012, and survived.

== Electoral history ==
=== 2008 ===
2008 Connecticut 100th House District Election
Party	Candidate	Votes	%
Democratic	Matt Lesser	5,704	47.6
Working Families	Matt Lesser	482	4
Republican	Ed Charamut	5,787	48.3

=== 2010 ===
2010 Connecticut 100th House District Election
Party	Candidate	Votes	%
Democratic	Matt Lesser	4,756	48.3
Working Families	Matt Lesser	296	3
Republican	John Swewczyk	4,433	45.1
Libertarian	John Swewczyk	245	2.5
Connecticut for Lieberman	John Swewczyk	109	1.1

=== 2012 ===
2012 Connecticut 100th House District Election
Party	Candidate	Votes	%
Democratic	Matthew Lesser	6,342	65.2
Working Families	Matthew Lesser	335	3.4
Republican	Deborah Kleckowksi	2,782	28.6
Independent Party	Deborah Kleckowksi	275	2.8

=== 2014 ===
2014 Connecticut 100th House District Election
Party	Candidate	Votes	%
Democratic	Matt Lesser	4,558	63
Working Families	Matt Lesser	537	7.4
Republican	Angel R. Fernandez	2,138	29.6

=== 2016 ===
2016 Connecticut 100th House District Election
Party	Candidate	Votes	%
Democratic	Matt Lesser	6,417	62.6
Working Families	Matt Lesser	696	6.8
Republican	Anthony R.J. Moran	3,136	30.6

=== 2018 ===
2018 Connecticut 9th Senate District Election Democratic Primary
Party	Candidate	Votes	%
Democratic	Matt Lesser	4,779	56.4%
Democratic	Antonio "Tony" Guerrera	3,699	43.6%

2018 Connecticut 9th Senate District Election
Party	Candidate	Votes	%
Democratic	Matt Lesser	22,724	54.22
Working Families	Matt Lesser	1,519	3.62
Republican	Ed Charamut	17,674	42.15

=== 2020 ===
2020 Connecticut 9th Senate District Election
Party	Candidate	Votes	%
Democratic	Matt Lesser	29,473	54.85
Working Families	Matt Lesser	1,509	2.87%
Republican	Richie Ruglio	21,609	40.22
Independent Party	Richie Ruglio	1,139	2.12

=== 2022 ===
2022 Connecticut 9th Senate District Election
Party	Candidate	Votes	%
Democratic	Matt Lesser	19,593	52.94
Working Families	Matt Lesser	632	1.71
Independent Party	Matt Lesser	346	0.93
Republican	Lisa J. Marotta	16,440	44.42
