= Antonio Guerrera =

American politician

Member of the Connecticut House of Representatives from the 29th district
- In office January 3, 2001 – January 9, 2019
- Preceded by: Richard Tulisano
- Succeeded by: Kerry Szeps Wood

Personal details
- Born: January 30, 1963 (age 63) Hartford, Connecticut, U.S.
- Party: Democratic

Antonio Guerrera (born January 30, 1963) is an American politician who served in the Connecticut House of Representatives from the 29th district from 2001 to 2019.
