= Martin Looney =

American politician (born 1948)

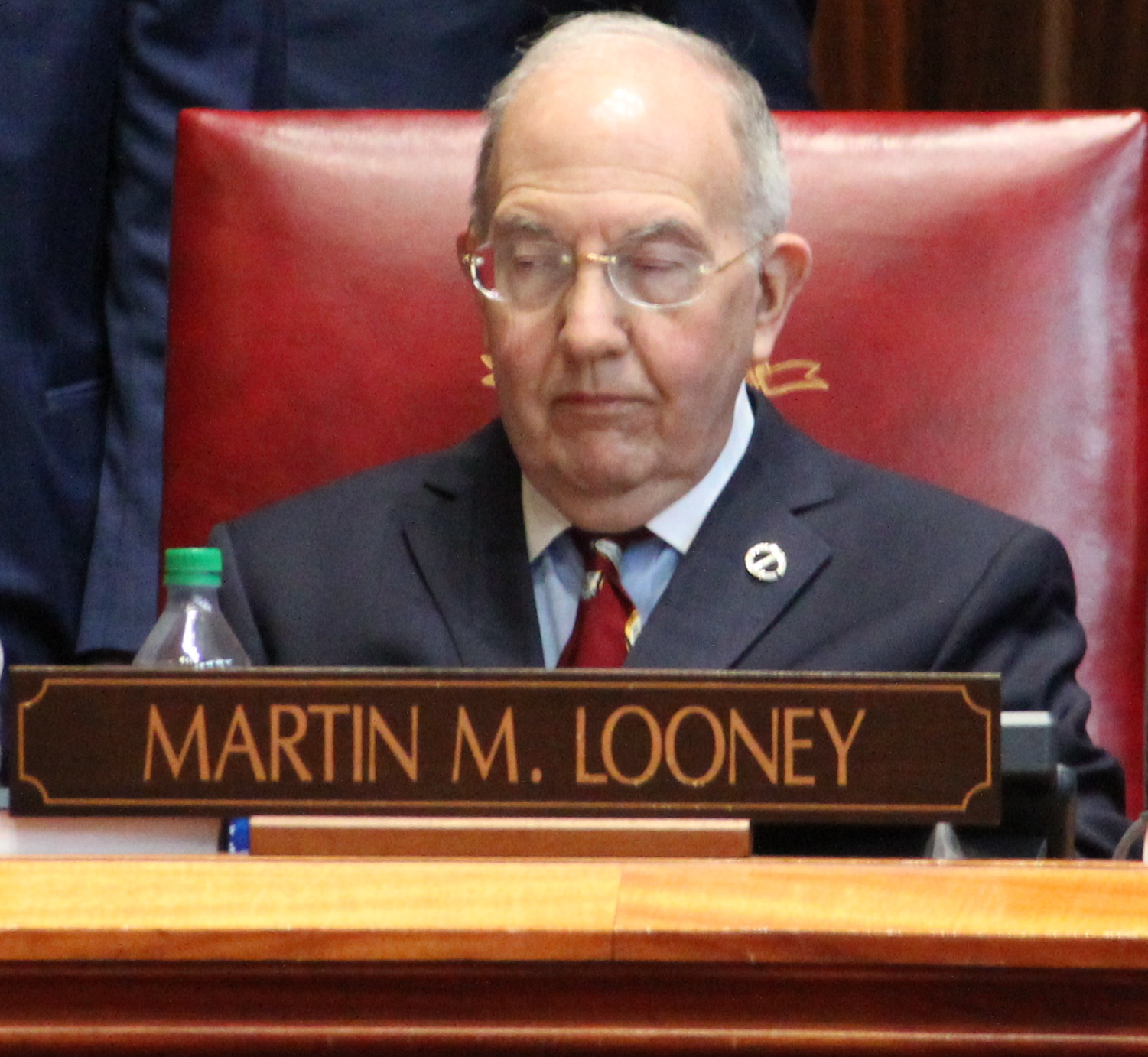
- Looney in 2023

President pro tempore of the Connecticut Senate
- Incumbent
- Assumed office January 7, 2015 Serving with Len Fasano (2017–2019)
- Preceded by: Donald E. Williams Jr.

Majority Leader of the Connecticut State Senate
- In office January 2003 – January 7, 2015
- Preceded by: George Jepsen
- Succeeded by: Bob Duff

Member of the Connecticut State Senate from the 11th district
- Incumbent
- Assumed office January 6, 1993
- Preceded by: Anthony Avallone

Member of the Connecticut House of Representatives from the 96th district
- In office January 7, 1981 – January 6, 1993
- Preceded by: Joseph Carbone
- Succeeded by: Cameron Staples

Personal details
- Born: July 23, 1948 (age 78) New Haven, Connecticut, U.S.
- Party: Democratic
- Spouse: Ellen Ritchie
- Education: Fairfield University (BA); University of Connecticut, Storrs (MA); University of Connecticut, Hartford (JD)

Martin M. Looney (born July 23, 1948) is an American politician. Looney, a Democrat, has been a state senator from Connecticut since 1993. From 2003 to 2014, Looney served as Majority Leader of the Senate; in 2015 he became President Pro Tempore of the Senate.

Looney, a resident of New Haven, represents the eastern half of the city as well as parts of Hamden in the Connecticut Senate. He is also a part-time professor at Quinnipiac University and the University of New Haven in Hamden, CT and West Haven, CT, respectively, where he teaches classes such as State and Local Governments.

Looney was born in New Haven and graduated from Fairfield University and later received his M.A. in English from University of Connecticut followed by his J.D. from University of Connecticut School of Law Prior to being elected to the Connecticut Senate, Looney served as a Connecticut state representative. In 2001, Looney lost to incumbent John DeStefano Jr. in the Democratic primary for mayor of New Haven.

In July 2016, Looney said he would "certainly" consider running for Governor of Connecticut if incumbent Lieutenant Governor Nancy Wyman decided not to run in the 2018 election.

On May 2, 2026, Looney announced he would not seek re-election to an 18th term in the Senate. He endorsed Majority leader Bob Duff to succeed him as President pro tempore of the Senate and state representative Al Paolillo to succeed him as state senator for the 11th district.

== Political positions ==
Looney is a supporter of legislation strengthening gun safety measures. In 2013, weeks after the Sandy Hook mass shooting, Looney introduced 17 bills that would change firearm control and rights in Connecticut. He was instrumental in the eventual passage of legislation considered some of the strongest in the country.

Looney led the creation of Connecticut’s Earned Income Tax Credit in 2011 and has been influential in ensuring it remains a part of the state’s budget. The Earned Income Tax Credit, or EITC, is a state income tax credit supporting low-income working individuals and families.

Looney led passage of legislation to cap the out-of-pocket cost of prescription drugs like insulin and has introduced legislation to reduce the cost of pharmaceutical drugs in Connecticut through use of generic drug manufacturers. He led the Senate during the passage of the legalization of marijuana and was Senate Majority Leader during the abolition of the state’s death penalty.

Connecticut House of Representatives
| Preceded by Joseph Carbone | Member of the Connecticut House of Representatives from the 96th district 1981–1993 | Succeeded by Cameron Staples |
Connecticut State Senate
| Preceded by Anthony Avallone | Member of the Connecticut State Senate from the 11th district 1993–present | Incumbent |
| Preceded by George Jepsen | Majority Leader of the Connecticut State Senate; 2003–2015 | Succeeded by Bob Duff |
| Preceded by Donald E. Williams Jr. | President pro tempore of the Connecticut Senate; 2015–present Served alongside: Len Fasano (2017–2019) | Incumbent |
