= Paul Doyle (politician) =

American politician (born 1963)

Paul R. Doyle

Member of the Connecticut State Senate from the 9th district
- In office January 3, 2007 – January 9, 2019
- Preceded by: Biagio Ciotto
- Succeeded by: Matt Lesser

Member of the Connecticut House of Representatives from the 28th district
- In office January 4, 1995 – January 3, 2007
- Preceded by: Robert G. Gilligan
- Succeeded by: Russell Morin

Personal details
- Born: Paul Robert Doyle; April 30, 1963 (age 63) Hartford, Connecticut, U.S.
- Party: Democratic
- Spouse: Diana Doyle
- Education: Colby College (BA); University of Connecticut (JD

Paul Robert Doyle (born April 30, 1963) is an American politician who served as a Democratic state senator of Connecticut's 9th State Senate District 2007 from to 2019. A resident of Wethersfield, Doyle represented the southern suburbs of Hartford in the Connecticut Senate, including the towns of Cromwell, Middletown, Newington, Rocky Hill, and Wethersfield. He is currently a Connecticut superior court judge.

== Personal life ==
Doyle was born in Hartford, Connecticut and received a B.A. in History from Colby College and his Juris Doctor from the University of Connecticut.

In June 2016, Doyle provided information that assisted in the arrest of a bank robber. He was able to provide this information because he halted the robbery in progress by chasing the suspect. The robber, who was already serving time for drug charges, was arrested for the attempted robbery at the end of his prior sentence.

== Political career ==
Prior to being elected in the Connecticut Senate, Doyle was a liaison for the Wethersfield Chamber of Commerce. He was also an executive assistant for the Democratic State Central Committee. He was treasurer of the Town of Wethersfield from 1989 to 1991.

Doyle served on the Wethersfield Town Council from 1991 to 1994. He was later elected as a Connecticut State Representative, a role he held from 1994 to 2006. In 2006, Doyle ran for the Connecticut Senate for the first time and won. In 2018, he stepped down from his senate seat to pursue an unsuccessful candidacy for Attorney General.

In 2023, Doyle was nominated for the state judiciary by Governor Ned Lamont (D). The nomination was confirmed by the Judiciary Committee during that year's legislative session. Doyle currently serves as a Connecticut superior court judge.

== See also ==
- Connecticut Senate

Connecticut House of Representatives
Preceded by Robert G. Gilligan	Connecticut state representative from the Twenty-Eighth District; 1995–2007	Succeeded by Russell A. Morin
Connecticut State Senate
Preceded by Biagio Ciotto	Connecticut Senator from the Ninth District; 2007–2018	Succeeded by Matt Lesser
