= Joan Hartley =

American politician

Joan V. Hartley

Member of the Connecticut State Senate from the 15th district
- Incumbent
- Assumed office 2001
- Preceded by: Thomas "Tim" Upson
- Constituency: represents Naugatuck, Middlebury, and Waterbury

Member of the Connecticut House of Representatives from the 73rd district
- In office 1985–2001
- Preceded by: John G. Rowland
- Succeeded by: Jeffrey J. Berger

Personal details
- Born: Waterbury, Connecticut
- Party: Democratic
- Spouse: James Hartley

Joan V. Hartley is an American politician. A Democrat, she has been a state senator from Connecticut since 2001.

== Biography ==
A long time resident of Waterbury, she represents a large part of Waterbury, the northern part of Naugatuck and the northeastern part Middlebury. Hartley was born in Waterbury and graduated from Elms College and received a M.A. from Trinity College. Prior to being elected to the Senate, Hartley served as a Connecticut state representative representing the 73rd District from 1984 to 2000.

Hartley is generally considered one of the most conservative members of the Democratic caucus. She voted against redefining marriage as the legal union of two persons, guaranteeing equal protection under the law for same-sex couples. In 2011, Hartley and Paul Doyle were the only two Democrats to vote against transgender rights legislation.

In December 2008, Hartley was removed as the Chairwoman of the Higher Education Committee.

In 2008, Hartley was one of three Democrats who supported Rell's proposal for a Three Strikes Law against career violent criminals. In 2009, Hartley was the only Democrat in the State Senate that did not vote to override Rell's veto of the Healthcare Partnership bill, thereby preventing the bill from becoming law.

Connecticut House of Representatives
Preceded by John G. Rowland	Connecticut state representative for the Seventy-Third District; 1985–2001	Succeeded by Jeffrey Berger
Connecticut State Senate
Preceded by Thomas Upson	Connecticut Senator from the Fifteenth District; 2001–present	Succeeded by incumbent
