= Thomas Colapietro =

American politician

Thomas Colapietro (born 1940) is a former Democratic Connecticut State Senator who represented Bristol, Plainville, Plymouth, and part of Harwinton.

He was born and lives in Bristol, Connecticut.
