= Connecticut's 9th State Senate district =

American legislative district

Senator
Matt Lesser; D

Connecticut's 9th State Senate district elects one member of the Connecticut State Senate. It consists of the towns of Cromwell, Newington, Rocky Hill, and parts of Middletown and Wethersfield. The district is currently represented by Democrat Matt Lesser, who has served since 2019.

== Recent elections ==
=== 2022 ===
2022 Connecticut State Senate election, District 9
Party	Candidate	Votes	%
Democratic	Matt Lesser (incumbent)	19,593	52.94
Republican	Lisa J. Marotta	16,440	44.42
Working Families	Matt Lesser	632	1.71
Independent	Matt Lesser	346	0.93

=== 2020 ===
2020 Connecticut State Senate election, District 9
Party	Candidate	Votes	%
Democratic	Matt Lesser (incumbent)	29,473	54.85
Republican	Richie Ruglio	21,609	40.22
Independent Party	Richie Ruglio	1,139	2.12
Working Families	Matt Lesser (incumbent)	1,509	2.81
Total votes		53,730	100.00
Democratic hold			

=== 2018 ===
2018 Connecticut State Senate election, District 9
Party	Candidate	Votes	%
Total	Matt Lesser	24,253	57.8
Democratic	Matt Lesser	22,734	54.2
Working Families	Matt Lesser	1,519	3.6
Republican	Ed Charamut	17,674	42.2
Total votes		41,927	100.0
Democratic hold			

=== 2016 ===
2016 Connecticut State Senate election, District 9
Party	Candidate	Votes	%
Democratic	Paul Doyle	29,684	63.3
Republican	Earle Roberts	17,213	36.7
Total votes		46,897	100.0
Democratic hold			

=== 2014 ===
2014 Connecticut State Senate election, District 9
Party	Candidate	Votes	%
Democratic	Paul Doyle	20,799	63.1
Republican	Earle Roberts	12,164	36.9
Total votes		32,963	100.0
Democratic hold			

=== 2012 ===
2012 Connecticut State Senate election, District 9
Party	Candidate	Votes	%
Democratic	Paul Doyle	28,995	67.1
Republican	Earle Roberts	14,187	32.9
Total votes		43,182	100.0
Democratic hold			
