= Connecticut's 80th House of Representatives district =

American legislative district

Connecticut's 80th State House of Representatives district
Representative
Gale Mastrofrancesco; R

Connecticut's 80th House of Representatives district elects one member of the Connecticut House of Representatives. It consists of the town of Wolcott and parts of Southington. It has been represented by Republican Gale Mastrofrancesco since 2019.

== List of representatives ==
List of Representatives from Connecticut's 80th State House District
Representative	Party	Years	District home	Note
Joseph J. Killeen	Democratic	1967–1971	Meriden	Seat created
James Gaffney	Democratic	1971–1973	Meriden	
Eugene A. Migliaro Jr.	Republican	1973–1975	Wolcott	
William T. Moriarty	Democratic	1975–1977	Wolcott	
Eugene A. Migliaro Jr.	Republican	1977–1993	Wolcott	
Dennis H. Cleary	Republican	1993–2003	Wolcott	
John Mazurek	Democratic	2003–2011	Wolcott	
Robert Sampson	Republican	2011–2019	Wolcott	
Gale Mastrofrancesco	Republican	2019–	Wolcott	

== Recent elections ==
=== 2020 ===
2020 Connecticut State House of Representatives election, District 80
Party	Candidate	Votes	%
Republican	Gale Mastrofrancesco (incumbent)	8,559	61.82
Democratic	John Corky Mazurek	4,734	34.19
Independent Party	John Corky Mazurek	553	3.99
Total votes		13,846	100.00
Republican hold			

=== 2018 ===
2018 Connecticut House of Representatives election, District 80
Party	Candidate	Votes	%
Republican	Gale Mastrofrancesco	7,378	68.5
Democratic	David Borzellino	3,338	31.0
Independent Party	Benjamin Conroy	59	0.5
Total votes		10,775	100.00
Republican hold			

=== 2016 ===
2016 Connecticut House of Representatives election, District 80
Party	Candidate	Votes	%
Republican	Robert Sampson (Incumbent)	10,529	100.00
Total votes		10,529	100.00
Republican hold			

=== 2014 ===
2014 Connecticut House of Representatives election, District 80
Party	Candidate	Votes	%
Republican	Robert Sampson (Incumbent)	5,440	60.8
Democratic	Corky Mazurek	1,810	31.4
Working Families	Corky Mazurek	361	4.0
Independent Party	Robert Sampson (Incumbent)	331	3.7
Total votes		8,942	100.00
Republican hold			

=== 2012 ===
2012 Connecticut House of Representatives election, District 80
Party	Candidate	Votes	%
Republican	Robert Sampson (Incumbent)	6,226	56.3
Democratic	David Borzellino	4,829	43.7
Total votes		11,055	100.00
Republican hold			
