= 2010 Connecticut Senate election =

2010 Connecticut State Senate election
- November 2, 2010

All 36 seats in the Connecticut State Senate 19 seats needed for a majority
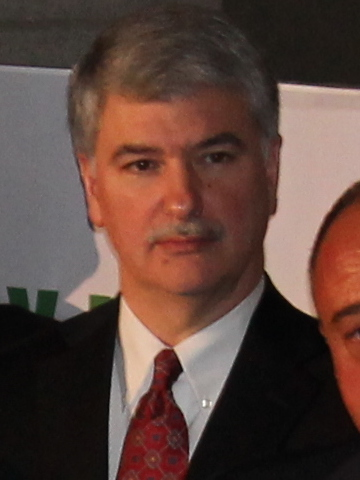

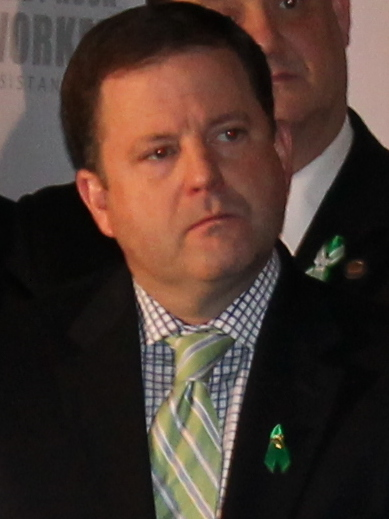
	Majority party	Minority party
Leader	Donald Williams	John McKinney
Party	Democratic	Republican
Leader since	July 1, 2004	June 2007
Leader's seat	29th	28th
Last election	24	12
Seats after	23	13
Seat change	▼1	▲1
- Results: Democratic hold Republican hold Republican gain
President pro tempore of the Senate before election
Donald Williams
Democratic
Elected President pro tempore of the Senate
Donald Williams
Democratic

The 2010 Connecticut Senate election was held on Tuesday, November 2, 2010, to elect members to the Connecticut State Senate, one from each of the state's 36 Senatorial districts. The date of this the election corresponded with other elections in the state, including ones for governor, U.S. Senate, and the Connecticut House of Representatives.

Senators elected are serving a two-year term, which began in January 2011.

The 2010 election cycle saw the election or re-election of 23 Democrats and 13 Republicans to fill the Senate's 36 seats. The only change in party representation occurred in the 31st District, where the incumbent Democrat was defeated, yielding a gain by the Republican Party. Three re-elected senators, all Democrats, resigned following the election, creating vacancies later filled by special elections on February 22, 2011.

== Predictions ==
Source	Ranking	As of
Governing	Safe D	November 1, 2010

== Results ==
Results of the 2010 Connecticut Senate election. Party shading denotes winner of Senate seat.

District	Constituency	Incumbent	Votes for Republican candidate	Votes for Democratic candidate
1	Hartford (part), Wethersfield (part)	John W. Fonfara (D)	Barbara Rhue; 3,478	John W. Fonfara; 11,980^{WF}^{TP}
2	Bloomfield (part), Hartford (part), Windsor (part)	Eric D. Coleman (D)	None	Eric D. Coleman; 20,918^{WF}
3	East Hartford, East Windsor, Ellington, South Windsor	Gary LeBeau (D)	Robert L. Gonzalez; 10,782	Gary D. LeBeau; 19,159^{WF}
4	Bolton, Glastonbury, Manchester, Marlborough	Mary Ann Handley (D)	Stewart "Chip" Beckett; 18,488	Steve Cassano; 18,561^{WF}
5	Bloomfield (part), Burlington, Farmington (part), West Hartford	Jonathan A. Harris (D)	Joseph Merritt; 15,183	Beth Bye; 25,085^{WF}
6	Berlin, Farmington (part), New Britain	Donald J. DeFronzo (D)	Henry Zembko; 7,307	Donald J. DeFronzo †; 15,556^{WF}
7	East Granby, Enfield, Granby (part), Somers, Suffield, Windsor (part), Windsor Locks	John A. Kissel (R)	John A. Kissel; 17,272^{RWI}	Karen M. Jarmoc; 16,286
8	Avon, Barkhamsted, Canton, Colebrook, Granby (part), Hartland, Harwinton (part), New Hartford, Norfolk, Simsbury, Torrington (part)	Kevin Witkos (R)	Kevin Witkos; 26,417	Donald J. O'Brien; 14,026^{WF}
9	Cromwell, Middletown (part), Newington, Rocky Hill, Wethersfield (part)	Paul R. Doyle (D)	Dom Mazzoccoli; 13,727	Paul R. Doyle; 21,582
10	New Haven (part), West Haven (part)	Toni N. Harp (D)	None	Toni N. Harp; 16,294
11	Hamden (part), New Haven (part)	Martin M. Looney (D)	Matthew J. Corcoran; 5,597	Martin M. Looney; 19,438^{WF}
12	Branford, Durham, Gilford, Killingworth, Madison, North Branford	Edward Meyer (D)	Lisa Davenport; 19,567	Edward Meyer; 21,311
13	Cheshire (part), Meriden, Middlefield, Middletown (part)	Thomas P. Gaffey (D)	Len Suzio; 13,238	Thomas P. Gaffey †; 18,369^{WF}
14	Milford, Orange, West Haven (part)	Gayle Slossberg (D)	Vincent Marino; 14,339	Gayle Slossberg; 19,420^{I}
15	Naugatuck (part), Prospect, Waterbury (part)	Joan V. Hartley (D)	None	Joan V. Hartley; 14,178^{TP}
16	Cheshire (part), Southington, Waterbury (part), Wolcott	Sam S.F. Caligiuri (R)	Joe Markley; 16,861^{TP}	John N. Barry; 14,607^{WF}
17	Ansonia, Beacon Falls, Bethany, Derby, Hamden (part), Naugatuck (part), Woodbridge	Joe Crisco (D)	Tamath K. Rossi; 12,292	Joe Crisco; 16,666^{WF}
18	Griswold, Groton, North Stonington, Plainfield, Preston, Sterling, Stonington, Voluntown	Andrew M. Maynard (D)	Stuart R. Norman, Jr. 12,126	Andrew M. Maynard; 17,972
19	Andover, Bozrah, Columbia, Franklin, Hebron, Lebanon, Ledyard, Lisbon, Montville (part), Norwich, Sprague	Edith G. Prague (D)	Sean Sullivan; 14,795	Edith G. Prague; 15,597^{WF}
20	East Lyme, Montville (part), New London, Old Lyme, Old Saybrook (part), Salem, Waterford	Andrea Stillman (D)	Daniel Docker; 11,003	Andrea Stillman; 20,340^{TP}
21	Monroe (part), Shelton, Stratford (part)	Dan Debicella (R)	Kevin C. Kelly; 22,455	James R. Miron; 10,864
22	Bridgeport (part), Monroe (part), Trumbull	Anthony Musto (D)	David R. Pia; 12,899	Anthony J. Musto; 14,861^{WF}
23	Bridgeport (part), Stratford (part)	Ed A. Gomes (D)	Milton Johnson; 275	Edwin A. Gomes; 10,797^{WF}
24	Bethel (part), Danbury, New Fairfield, Sherman	Michael McLachlan (R)	Michael A. McLachlan; 15,649^{I}	Alice M. Hutchinson; 10,956^{WF}
25	Darien (part), Norwalk	Bob Duff (D)	Artie Kassimis; 10,358	Bob Duff; 18,767
26	Bethel (part), New Canaan (part), Redding, Ridgefield, Weston (part), Westport, Wilton	Toni Boucher (R)	Toni Boucher; 25,417	John Hartwell; 16,262^{WF}
27	Darien (part), Stamford (part)	Andrew J. McDonald (D)	Bob Kolenberg; 10,321	Andrew J. McDonald †; 14,750
28	Easton, Fairfield, Newtown, Weston (part)	John P. McKinney (R)	John McKinney; 26,249	Mitchell Fuchs; 12,694
29	Brooklyn, Canterbury, Killingly, Mansfield, Putnam, Scotland, Thompson, Windham	Donald E. Williams, Jr. (D)	None	Donald E. Williams; 17,214^{TP}
30	Brookfield, Canaan, Cornwall, Goshen, Kent, Litchfield, Morris, New Milford, North Canaan, Salisbury, Sharon, Torrington (part), Warren, Washington, Winchester	Andrew W. Roraback (R)	Andrew Roraback; 27,379^{TP}^{RWI}	None
31	Bristol, Harwinton (part), Plainville, Plymouth	Thomas A. Colapietro (D)	Jason Welch; 14,717	Tom Colapietro; 13,944^{WF}
32	Bethlehem, Bridgewater, Middlebury, Oxford, Roxbury, Seymour (part), Southbury, Thomaston, Watertown, Woodbury	Rob Kane (R)	Robert J. Kane; 28,909	None
33	Chester, Clinton, Colechester, Deep River, East Haddam, East Hampton, Essex, Haddam, Lyme, Old Saybrook (part), Portland, Westbrook	Eileen M. Daily (D)	Neil Nichols; 17,851	Eileen M. Daily; 21,069^{TP}
34	East Haven, North Haven, Wallingford	Len Fasano (R)	Leonard A. Fasano; 23,454^{WF}	None
35	Ashford, Chaplin, Coventry, Eastford, Ellington (part), Hampton, Pomfret, Stafford, Tolland, Union, Vernon, Willington, Woodstock	Tony Guglielmo (R)	Tony Guglielmo; 23,996	Susan Eastwood; 13,889^{WF}
36	Greenwich, New Canaan (part), Stamford (part)	L. Scott Frantz (R)	L. Scott Frantz; 21,926^{TP}	Nancy E. Barton; 13,001

Notes

† Denotes resignation after election. Vacancy later filled by a special election on February 22, 2011.
^{TP} Denotes that a minor, third party candidate (or candidates) also ran in this district's election.
^{RWI} Denotes that a registered write-in candidate was also present in this district's election.
^{WF} Denotes that this candidate also ran on the line of the Connecticut Working Families Party. The votes won by this candidate include both their Working Families and their party of affiliation figures combined.
^{I} Denotes that this candidate also ran on the independent line. The votes won by this candidate include both their independent and their party of affiliation figures combined.
