= Neil O'Leary =

American politician (born 1958)

Neil M. O'Leary
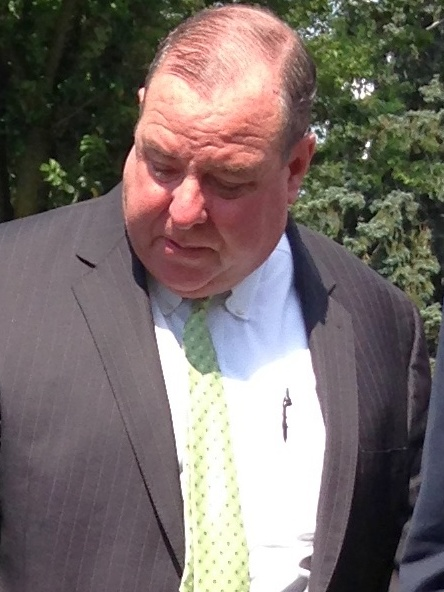

46th Mayor of Waterbury, Connecticut
- In office December 1, 2011 – December 1, 2023
- Preceded by: Michael Jarjura
- Succeeded by: Paul K. Pernerewski Jr.

Personal details
- Born: October 10, 1958 (age 67) Waterbury, Connecticut, U.S.
- Party: Democratic
- Spouse: Kathy O'Leary
- Children: Patrick and Maggie
- Education: Dean College; University of New Haven
- Occupation: Mayor of Waterbury
- Website: Office of the Mayor

Neil Michael O'Leary (born October 10, 1958) is an American politician and retired police chief who served as the 46th mayor of the City of Waterbury, Connecticut until 2023. He is a member of the Democratic Party.

== Chief of police ==
In 1980, O'Leary joined the Waterbury Police Department. In 2004, he became Waterbury Chief of Police. In the summer of 2009, O'Leary left his position in Waterbury to become the chief of police of Wolcott, Connecticut.

== Politics ==
In 2011, O'Leary stepped down as Wolcott Chief of Police to run for mayor of Waterbury. One of O'Leary's efforts bore fruit early on, with the opening of three new pre-kindergarten through eighth-grade primary schools, as well as the Waterbury Career Academy High School. In response to complaints about the condition of parks, O'Leary established a summer youth corps that helped perform routine maintenance in the City's parks. He also officially enrolled Waterbury in the national "Cities of Service" organization, which employs public service as a serious method to address critical local concerns. Employing a similar approach to blighted housing, O'Leary helped neighborhoods develop a comprehensive anti-blight program with reciprocal chores and responsibilities. He is collaborating with state and federal governments to reclaim abandoned industrial lands along the City's river-rail spine, the site of an alternate transportation riverfront greenway. In March 2023, O'Leary announced he was not running for reelection as Mayor.

=== Elections ===
==== 2011 ====
The mayoral elections were held on November 8, 2011, and O'Leary won with 45.97% of the votes, beating former mayor of Waterbury, Michael Jarjura.

General election results
Party	Candidate	Votes	%
Democratic	Neil O'Leary	7,648	45.97
Republican	Michael Jarjura	5,881	35.35
Independent	Lawrence DePillo	3,107	18.68
Turnout		12,580	30.92

==== 2013 ====
On November 5, 2013, O'Leary was re-elected for a second term, defeating board of education commissioner Jason Van Stone and perennial Independent Party candidate Larry DePillo. The turnout for the election was 23%.

General election results
Party	Candidate	Votes	%
Democratic	Neil O'Leary	8,323	66.16
Republican	Jason Van Stone	2,428	19.30
Independent	Lawrence DePillo	1,811	14.40
Turnout		12,580	23

==== 2015 ====
On November 3, 2015, O'Leary was re-elected for a third term, soundly defeating all challengers. The voter turnout for the election was 21%. As a result of a change to the city charter following the 2014 charter referendum, O'Leary became the first mayor of Waterbury to win a four-year term.

General election results
Party	Candidate	Votes	%
Democratic	Neil O'Leary	7,842	68.13
Independent	Lawrence DePillo	2,076	18.03
Republican	Jose Morales	1,347	11.70
Petitioning	Jimmie L. Griffin	245	2.12
Turnout		12,763	22.60

==== 2019 ====
Election day was Nov 5th, 2019. O'Leary won a fourth term for office, collecting a resounding 68.61% of the vote.

General election results
Party	Candidate	Votes	%
Democratic	Neil O'Leary	7,492	68.61
Republican	Ray Work	2,169	19.86
Independent	Vernon R. Matthews Jr.	636	5.82
Petitioning	Keisha M. Gilliams	128	3.92
Write-in	Tyler M. McElrath	128	1.79
Write-in	Roberta M. Crispino	0	0
Turnout		10,890	20.77

Political offices
Preceded by Michael Jarjura	Mayor of Waterbury, Connecticut; 2011–2023	Succeeded by Paul K. Pernerewski Jr.
