= Senator Markley =

Senator Markley may refer to:

- Joe Markley (born 1956), Connecticut State Senate
- Philip Swenk Markley (1789–1834), Pennsylvania State Senate
