= Anthony D'Amelio =

Connecticut politician

Member of the Connecticut House of Representatives from the 71st district
- In office January 24, 1996 – December 31, 2021
- Preceded by: Philip Giordano
- Succeeded by: William Pizzuto

Personal details
- Born: March 2, 1964 (age 62)
- Party: Republican
- Spouse: Joanne
- Children: 3
- Website: Official website

Anthony D'Amelio (born March 2, 1964) is an American politician. He served as a Republican member of the Connecticut House of Representatives, first elected in a 1996 special election, and re-elected in every regular election from then until 2020. In 2007, he ran for Mayor of Waterbury. However, he came in third losing to incumbent Michael Jarjura and Independent Party of Connecticut candidate Dennis Odle. He resigned from office on December 31, 2021, to focus on work at his restaurant in Waterbury.
