= Connecticut's 16th State Senate district =

American legislative district

Senator
Robert Sampson; R–Wolcott
- Demographics: 78.8% White; 6.9% Black; 10.2% Hispanic; 2.5% Asian; 0.2% Other
- Population (2010): 104,301

Connecticut's 16th State Senate district elects one member of the Connecticut State Senate.

== Geography ==
The district includes the East End of Wolcott, Prospect, Southington, and the East End of Waterbury.

== List of senators ==
Representative	Party	Years	District home	Note
Daniel V. Kerwin	Democratic	1961 – 1963	Waterbury	
James E. Tansley	Democratic	1963 – 1971	Waterbury	
William J. Sullivan	Democratic	1971 – 1984	Waterbury	
Joe Markley	Republican	1985 – 1987	Plantsville	
Donald M. Rinaldi	Democratic	1987 – 1989	Waterbury	
Stephen Somma	Republican	1989 – 2003	Waterbury	
Chris Murphy	Democratic	2003 – 2007	Cheshire	
Sam Caligiuri	Republican	2007 – 2011	Waterbury	
Joe Markley	Republican	2011 – 2019	Plantsville	
Robert Sampson	Republican	2019 – present	Wolcott	
