= Del Bianco =

Del Bianco is a surname. Notable people with the surname include:

- Christian Del Bianco (born 1997), Canadian professional lacrosse goaltender
- Doreen Del Bianco, American politician
- Luigi Del Bianco (1892–1969), Italian-American sculptor and chief carver of Mount Rushmore
- Paolo Del Bianco (born 1945), Italian architect
