= Robert Sampson (politician) =

Member of the Connecticut Senate (born 1969)

Rob Sampson
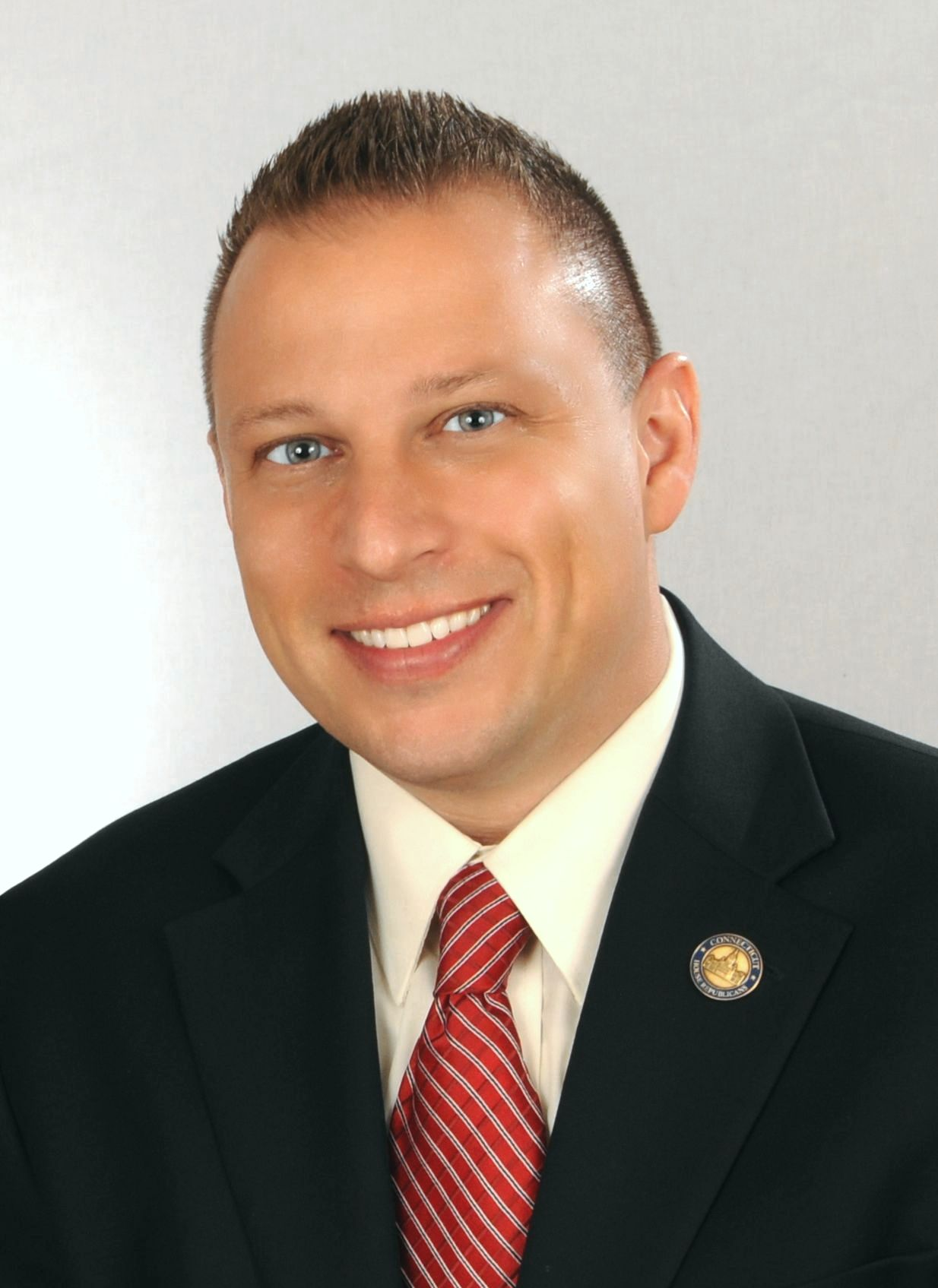

Minority Leader-elect of the Connecticut State Senate
- Incumbent
- Assumed office January 2019
- Preceded by: Joe Markley

Member of the Connecticut House of Representatives from the 80th district
- In office January 2011 – 2018
- Preceded by: John Mazurek
- Succeeded by: Gale Mastrofrancesco

Personal details
- Born: Robert Charles Sampson; August 28, 1969 (age 57) New Haven, Connecticut, U.S.
- Party: Republican
- Education: Attended Central Connecticut State University; no evidence he acquired a degree.

Robert Charles Sampson (born August 28, 1969) is an American politician from Connecticut. A member of the Republican Party, he was first elected in 2010 to the Connecticut House of Representatives from the 80th House district, serving four terms (2011–2018). Since 2019, he has been a member of the Connecticut State Senate, elected from the 16th Senate District, he is the minority leader-elect for the upcoming 2027 legislative session in the Connecticut State Senate.

== Early life ==
Sampson resides in Wolcott. He was raised in Meriden and graduated from Maloney High School.

== Political career ==
=== Elections ===
Sampson, a real estate and insurance agent, was elected to the Connecticut House of Representatives, representing the 80th State House District in 2010, and served four terms in the House. The 80th district at the time covered all of Wolcott and part of Southington. Sampson won the next races in 2012 and 2014. There was no opposition candidate in 2016.

Sampson was elected to the state Senate in 2018 from the 16th district. He won reelection in 2022.

=== Tenure ===
He currently serves as the Ranking Republican on the Government Administration & Elections, Housing, and the Labor & Public Employees Committees. He is also a member of the Judiciary Committee.

Sampson supported the Supreme Court's decisions in Harris v. Quinn, which limited the power of labor unions to collect agency fees. He opposed the New Britain to Hartford Busway.

Sampson is a staunch opponent of gun control. In 2013, after the Sandy Hook Elementary School massacre, he voted against a bipartisan gun control bill; in 2015, he introduced a failed measure to repeal the law. In 2019, Sampson and fellow John Kissel were the only senators to vote against "Ethan's Law," a safe storage law requiring gun owners to safely store firearms (whether loaded or unloaded) while not in use; the bill passed 31–2. Sampson has received awards from the Connecticut Citizens Defense League and NRA Institute for Legislative Action.

In 2013, Sampson was one of two state lawmakers who voted against a measure requiring officials to consider the necessity of mitigation for when making water treatment facility funding decisions. Regarding climate change, Sampson said he was opposed to a state mandate.

In 2017, Sampson was one of three Republicans in the Connecticut General Assembly who introduced legislation to reinstate capital punishment in Connecticut.

In 2011, Sampson voted against the confirmation of Connecticut Appellate Court Judge Lubbie Harper Jr. to the Connecticut Supreme Court. In March 2019, after Harper retired from the state supreme court, Sampson was the lone dissenter against Harper's confirmation to serve as a part-time trial referee; Sampson objected to Harper's vote in Kerrigan v. Commissioner of Public Health (2008), in which Harper joined the majority in holding that the state constitution gave same-sex couples the right to marry. Harper was confirmed 33–1. In 2019, Sampson was one of eight state representatives to vote against legislation banning conversion therapy; Sampson viewed the ban as a violation of parental rights.

In 2019, Sampson was one of three state Senators who voted against a tobacco control bill raising the legal age to purchase cigarettes and other tobacco products from age 18 to age 21.

In 2019, Sampson was one of two state Senators who voted against a bill banning the practice of pet leasing in Connecticut.

In 2023, Sampson was the lone "no" vote in the state Senate opposing a resolution exonerating the victims of the 17th-century Connecticut Witch Trials, in which eleven residents of Connecticut Colony were executed for witchcraft. The resolution, which passed 33–1, acknowledged the miscarriage of justice and apologized on behalf of the state. Sampson said he opposed the bill because the state had no "right to dictate what was right or wrong about periods in the past that we have no knowledge of".

In 2023, Sampson, along with other Connecticut Republicans, opposed legislation to expand the state's paid sick leave law to provide up to one week of paid sick leave annually for almost all Connecticut workers. He also opposed S.B. 152 'An Act Concerning the Protection of Warehouse Workers', which, among other provisions, was intended to prohibit "employers from requiring employees to meet quotas that interfere with meal periods, bathroom breaks, or compliance with safety regulations."

In the 2024 Housing Committee session Sampson, a landlord himself, was a vocal opponent of a bill that would have prohibited landlords from evicting tenants at the end of a lease term without a permissible cause (enumerated in the bill). Fielding an organizer's question whether he believed there was a power imbalance between landlords and tenants, he responded, "Yes, and generally speaking it's in favor of the tenant ..." drawing laughter from the audience. He later said that passing the bill would amount to "slavery" for the landlords.

In 2024, Sampson was featured in an episode of Last Week Tonight with John Oliver. The show featured a clip of Sampson arguing against S.B. 1114 'An Act Concerning a Study to Prohibit Private Equity Ownership in Hospice Care'. Sampson stated in his oral opposition on the State Senate floor on May 4, 2023: "This is America. This is a free market country. This is a capitalist country. This is not a socialist country, and it will not be if I can help it."

In the 2025 session of the Government Administration and Elections Committee, a bill was proposed to condemn the 1638 Treaty of Hartford which directed that the Pequot who survived the Pequot War be sold into slavery and their lands taken be condemned. Despite the historical testimony submitted in support, Sampson told the tribal vice chair that he did not know enough about 1638 to take sides. Then he asked given that the matter took place before the United States became a nation: "I'm curious why you feel it's necessary for an entirely different country, the United States of America, to address this issue. Have you brought this concern across the pond, you know, to England? ... And I'm just curious why it's important for Connecticut to address it."

In a 2025 interview, amid discussion of whether he would run for the governorship, Sampson described his view of Connecticut politics: "My view on politics in Connecticut right now is we're at war. ... We've been operating as if it's peacetime for too long as Connecticut Republicans."

In the 2026 session of the Connecticut State Senate, Senator Rob Sampson spoke longer than any other senator - 14 hours and 41 minutes. It was about 18% of the total time the senate spent in debate. Gayle Alberda, associate professor of politics at Fairfield University, was quoted as saying “[Talking] is kind of one of the only mechanisms, because they’re not in positions of leadership when they don’t have control of the chamber.”

When Connecticut chose not to participate in its official state exhibit at the July, 2026 America250 State Fair on the National Mall in Washington, D.C., state senator Rob Sampson and state representative Gale Mastrofrancesco decided to personally represent Connecticut at its designated booth. Sampson stated: "Whether you’re a Republican, Democrat, Independent, or unaffiliated voter, this is our state and our country’s milestone. I’m honored to stand on behalf of all Connecticut residents and share the rich history and contributions of the Constitution State with visitors from across America.”

In the 2026 midterm elections, Sampson narrowly prevailed over his democratic challenger and former opponent, Jack Perry, by just 1.2 points. Sampson becomes one of only three Republican senators in the Connecticut State Senate, with the official projection being 33-3 with a Democratic majority in both chambers of congress.

Sampson was elected as minority leader of the historic 33-3 Republican minority caucus after the current minority leader, state senator Stephen Harding, was ousted from his seat in Connecticut's 30th State Senate district from state senator-elect Aaron Zimmer. Sampson successfully managed to garner an informal electoral majority from his colleagues, state senator's Eric Berthel of Watertown & Henri Martin of Bristol, the only other two remaining Republicans in the Connecticut State Senate.

== Electoral history ==
=== State House of Representatives ===
CT House of Representative 2010 80th District Republican Primary
Party	Candidate	Votes	%
Republican	Rob Sampson	689	56.9
Republican	Alan Giacomi	523	43.2
Total votes		1,212	100

CT House of Representatives 2010 80th District General Election
Party	Candidate	Votes	%
Republican	Rob Sampson	4,658	50.2
Democratic	John "Corky" Mazurek (incumbent)	4,613	49.8
Total votes		9,271	100
Republican gain from Democratic			

CT House of Representatives 2012 80th District General Election
Party	Candidate	Votes	%
Republican	Robert Sampson	5,820	53.1
Independent	Rob Sampson	406	3.7
Total	Rob Sampson (incumbent)	6,226	56.8
Democratic	Chuck Marcella	4,279	39.1
Working Families	Chuck Marcella	450	4.1
Total	Chuck Marcella	4,729	43.2
Total votes		10,955	100
Republican hold			

CT House of Representatives 2014 80th District General Election
Party	Candidate	Votes	%
Republican	Rob Sampson	5,440	60.8
Independent	Rob Sampson	331	3.7
Total	Rob Sampson (incumbent)	5,771	64.5
Democratic	Corky Mazurek	2,810	31.4
Working Families	Corky Mazurek	361	4
Total	Chuck Marcella	3,171	35.5
Total votes		8,942	100
Republican hold			

CT House of Representatives 2016 80th District General Election
Party	Candidate	Votes	%
Republican	Rob Sampson	9,403	89.3
Independent	Rob Sampson	1,126	10.7
Total	Rob Sampson (incumbent)	10,529	100
Total votes		10,529	100
Republican hold			

=== State Senate ===
2018 CT State Senate 16th District General Election
Party	Candidate	Votes	%
Republican	Rob Sampson	23,099	54.6%
Independent	Rob Sampson	889	2.1%
Total	Rob Sampson	23,988	56.7%
Democratic	Vickie Orsini Nardello	17,162	40.6%
Working Families	Vickie Orsini Nardello	1,170	2.8%
Total	Vickie Orsini Nardello	18,332	43.3%
Total votes		42,320	100%
Republican hold			

2020 CT State Senate 16th District General Election
Party	Candidate	Votes	%
Republican	Rob Sampson (incumbent)	29,209	53.8%
Democratic	Jack Perry	22,717	41.8%
Independent	Jack Perry	1,537	2.8%
Working Families	Jack Perry	839	1.5%
Total	Jack Perry	25,093	46.2%
Write-in		4	0.0%
Total votes		54,306	100%
Republican hold			

2022 CT State Senate 16th District General Election
Party	Candidate	Votes	%
Republican	Rob Sampson	23,853	57.4%
Independent	Rob Sampson	516	1.2%
Total	Rob Sampson (incumbent)	24,369	58.6%
Democratic	Christopher Robertson	17,223	41.4%
Total votes		41,592	100%
Republican hold			

2024 CT State Senate 16th District General Election
Party	Candidate	Votes	%
Republican	Rob Sampson (incumbent)	29,813	56.6%
Democratic	Christopher Robertson	21,703	41.2%
Independent	Christopher Robertson	1,174	2.2%
Total	Christopher Robertson	22,877	43.4%
Total votes		52,690	100%
Republican hold			

2026 CT State Senate 16th District General Election
Party	Candidate	Votes	%
Republican	Rob Sampson (incumbent)	19,725	48.81%
Democratic	Jack Perry	19,952	49.37%
Independent	Rob Sampson (incumbent)	733	1.81%
Total	Rob Sampson (incumbent)	20,458	50.6%
Total votes		40,410	100%
Republican hold			
