= Philip Giordano =

American politician (born 1963)

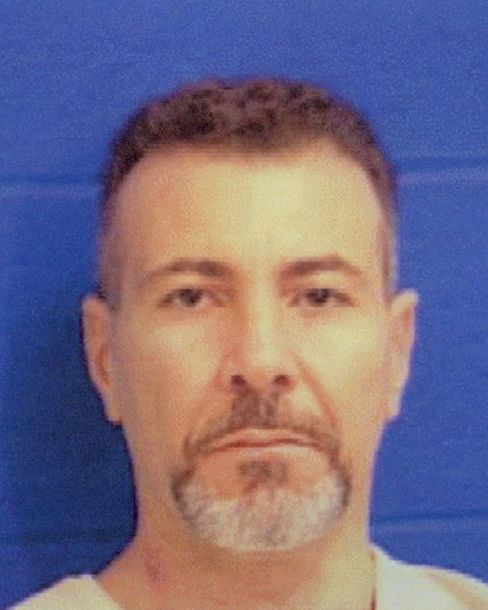

44th Mayor of Waterbury
- In office January 1, 1996 – October 15, 2001
- Preceded by: Edward Bergin
- Succeeded by: Sam Caligiuri

Member of the Connecticut House of Representatives from the 71st district
- In office January 7, 1995 – November 8, 1995
- Preceded by: Robert Davino
- Succeeded by: Anthony D'Amelio

Personal details
- Born: Philip Anthony Giordano; March 25, 1963 (age 63) Caracas, Venezuela
- Party: Republican
- Spouse: Dawn Trovato (m. 1994)
- Children: 4
- Education: Naugatuck Valley Community College (attended); University of Connecticut, Storrs (BA); Western Michigan University (JD)

Military service
- Allegiance: United States
- Branch/service: United States Marine Corps
- Years of service: 1981–1985
- Criminal information
- Status: Incarcerated at FCI, Englewood. Due to be released on July 29, 2032.
- Convictions: Federal convictions: Fourteen counts of using an interstate device to arrange sexual contact with children; Two counts of deprivation of rights under color of law; One count of conspiracy; State convictions: Four counts of first-degree Sexual assault; Four counts of conspiracy to commit sexual assault
- Penalty: Federal sentence: 37 years in prison; State sentence: 18 years in prison

Details
- Country: United States
- State: Connecticut
- Date apprehended: July 26, 2001

Philip Anthony Giordano (born March 25, 1963) is the former Republican mayor of Waterbury, Connecticut, and a convicted sex offender. He was born in Caracas, Venezuela, to Italian parents and his family moved to the United States when he was eight years old. A lawyer, former state representative and former Marine (1981–1985), Giordano served three terms as mayor after being elected for the first time in 1995. In 2000, he unsuccessfully ran for a seat in the United States Senate, losing to Joe Lieberman.

== Early life ==
Giordano was born in Caracas, Venezuela, to Rocco and Olimpia Giordano. He has one older sister and one younger brother. He attended Holy Cross High School, however he wasn't able to graduate with his class in 1981 after getting caught smoking marijuana. He served in the United States Marine Corps from 1981 until 1985. He attended Naugatuck Valley Community College, before transferring to the University of Connecticut. He graduated with an undergraduate degree in political science in 1988. Thereafter, he attended Cooley Law School in Lansing, Michigan. After law school, he worked in the Waterbury corporation counsel's office until 1992. In 2003, his law license was suspended and he was subsequently disbarred from practicing law in the state of Connecticut for 18 years in 2007.

== Early political career ==
In 1993, there was a special election in the 71st district of the Connecticut House of Representatives. It occurred after the incumbent, Donald J. Davino, died in a car accident. Giordano lost the election to Davino's son, Robert. After he lost on election night, he had what one onlooker described as "a major meltdown". He ran for the position again in the 1994 general election and won. He considered running for the United States House of Representatives against Congressman James H. Maloney in the 1998 election. He also considered running for Connecticut State Treasurer that same year.

== Mayor of Waterbury, Connecticut ==
Giordano was elected mayor in 1995, defeating seven-term Democratic Mayor Edward "Mike" Bergin, by 52% to 45%. He won reelection in 1997. He was reelected to a third term with 53% of the vote in 1999. During his time as mayor, he claimed to have balanced Waterbury's budget, but prior to his arrest a state oversight board had to intervene as a result of chronic pension underfunding and taking money out of the pension fund to balance the general fund. On July 18, 2001, Giordano announced he would not seek a fourth term as Mayor. Upon Giordano's arrest in 2001, he was forced to step aside, leaving President of the Board of Aldermen Sam Caligiuri as acting mayor.

== U.S. Senate race ==
In 2000, Senator Joe Lieberman was chosen by Democratic presidential nominee Al Gore to be his vice presidential running mate—and Lieberman also chose to run for a third term to the Senate (Connecticut law permits candidates running for both offices). Having little chance to defeat the very popular centrist Lieberman, few Connecticut Republicans wanted to take him on. Finally, the state GOP settled on Giordano. Lieberman focused on his vice presidential run and refused to show up at debates; Giordano, mostly ignored by the press, received some coverage by debating alone and mocking Lieberman. In the end, it mattered little, as voters returned the incumbent to the Senate by a nearly two-to-one margin (63% to 34%).

== Criminal history ==
While investigating municipal corruption, the FBI discovered phone records and pictures of Giordano with a prostitute, as well as with her 10-year-old niece and her eight-year-old daughter. In order to save the municipal corruption investigation, Giordano was apprehended by the FBI on July 23, 2001. After he was taken by the FBI, he worked with federal agents to tape various associates making incriminating statements regarding kickbacks in exchange for contracts. A high target on the list was Joseph Pontoriero, president of Worth Construction and associate of the Genovese crime family. A FBI agent testified that Giordano said Pontoriero had wanted to privatize and control a waste treatment plant in the North End of Waterbury. Giordano showed agents cash and suits he received from Pontoriero during his cooperation. Giordano also made calls to Michael Horton, an executive at Northeast Energy Partners. He tried to solicit a $25,000 payment from Horton in return for a $2 million contract to supply gas to the city; however, Horton did not make the payment. The information he gave helped federal officials attain 13 search warrants in the public corruption investigation. In December 2009, Pontoriero plead guilty to one count of giving a gratuity to a public official and one count of willfully failing to provide information to the IRS. He was sentenced to two years of probation.

Giordano was officially arrested on July 26, 2001. After his arrest, Giordano was denied bail because the judge deemed him a flight risk and a public danger. During the trial, Giordano took the stand in his own defense. During his testimony, Giordano admitted he took cash from Pontoriero and Horton. The Judge referred to his testimony as a disaster. In March 2003, he was convicted of 14 counts of using an interstate device, his cellphone, to arrange sexual contact with children. He was also convicted of violating the girls' civil rights. Judge Alan Harris Nevas sentenced Giordano to 37 years in prison. He was credited for 23 months as time served. Shortly after his federal conviction, he returned to Waterbury to face state charges. He initially plead not guilty. In June 2004, a Superior Court judge refused to dismiss state sexual assault charges. In June 2007, Giordano pleaded no contest to the state charges and Judge Joan K. Alexander sentenced him to 18 years in prison that ran concurrent to his federal sentence with credit for time served since his arrest.

In January 2004, Giordano filed an appeal on his federal conviction in the United States Court of Appeals for the Second Circuit. His conviction was upheld in March 2006. In June 2007, Giordano filed a memorandum to have his sentenced reduced to 25 years. In July 2007, his motion to reduce this sentence was denied by a federal judge. In 2006, Giordano sued the city for back pay resulting from sick days and vacation time. In 2006, Giordano was assaulted by a fellow inmate at Garner Correctional Institution. In 2009, the victims were awarded $8 million each in compensatory damages by a federal judge. In 2015, Giordano petitioned for a writ of habeas corpus and certificate of appealability, claiming that his original trial attorney never conveyed the offer of a 15-year plea deal. After a hearing and finding evidence to the contrary, Connecticut District Court judge Stefan R. Underhill rejected Giordano's request. In January 2017, the Supreme Court of the United States refused to hear an appeal from Giordano.

In July 2020, Giordano petitioned for compassionate release from federal prison due to the COVID-19 pandemic. In November 2021, Giordano sought a reduction in his sentence, citing teaching classes to inmates and also continuing to help federal authorities including the New Jersey State Commission of Investigation in their efforts to combat organized crime. In August 2022, his request was rejected. In January 2023, Giordano filed an appeal against the judge's denial for early release. In December 2023, the Second Circuit Court of Appeals upheld the judge's denial for early release. Giordano is serving his original 37-year sentence at the Englewood Federal Correctional Institution in Colorado (inmate #14302-014). Under federal rules, Giordano will serve at least 85%, or 29 years, of his sentence after which time he may be eligible for early release in July 2032 based on good behavior. In a 2023 interview with the two victims, it was revealed that Giordano has never admitted to the molestation or apologized for his actions.

== Personal life ==
Giordano married his wife, Dawn, in February 1994. They have three children. Dawn lives in Commack, New York on Long Island. Giordano also fathered a child with the woman at the center of his criminal case, as confirmed by DNA testing at the time.

Party political offices
Preceded by Jerry Labriola	Republican nominee for U.S. Senator from Connecticut (Class 1); 2000	Succeeded by Alan Schlesinger
