= Michael DiGiovancarlo =

American politician (born 1970)

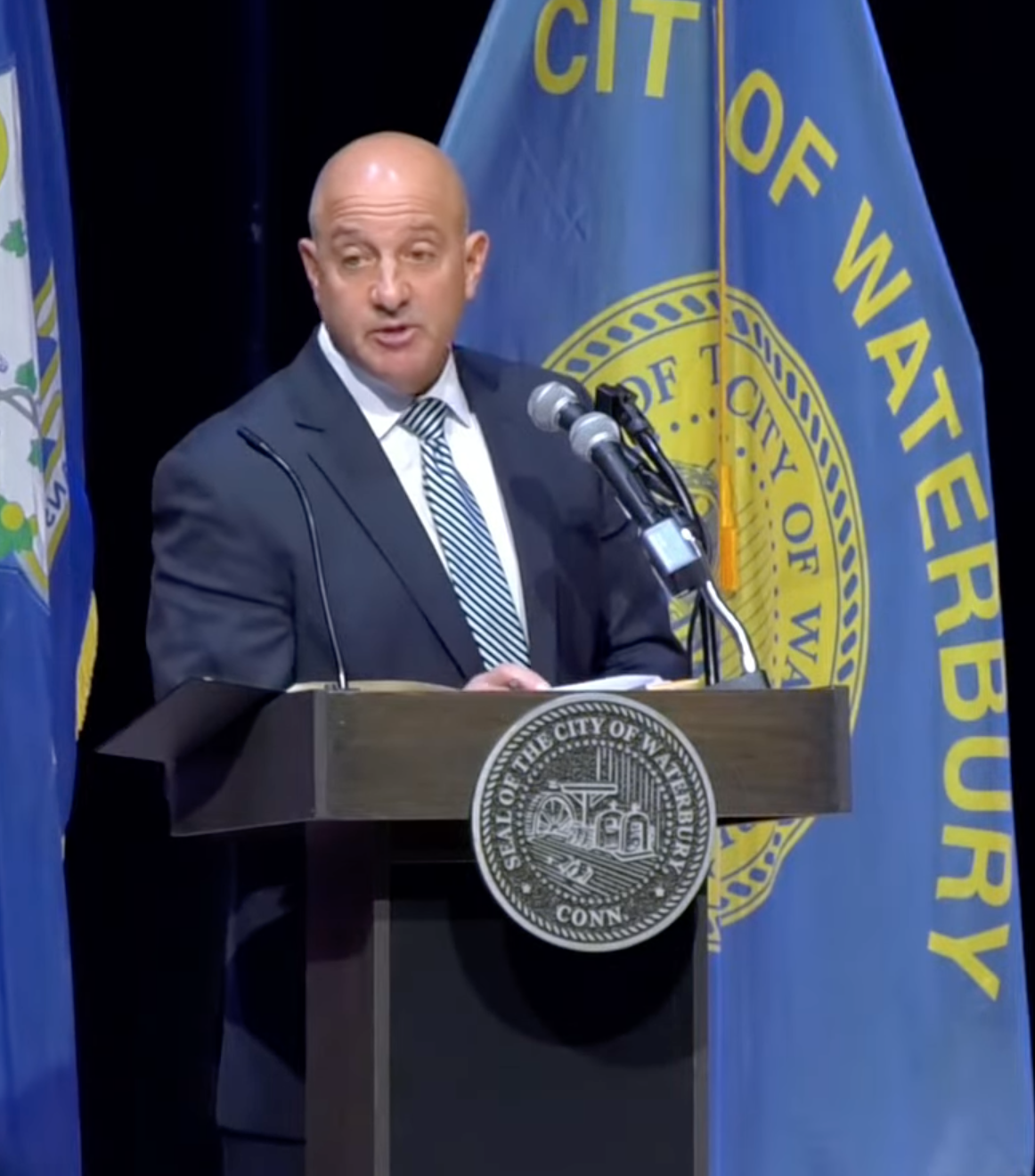
- DiGiovancarlo in 2025

Member of the Connecticut House of Representatives from the 74th district
- Incumbent
- Assumed office January 6, 2021
- Preceded by: Stephanie Cummings

Personal details
- Born: 1970 (age 55–56)
- Party: Democratic

Michael DiGiovancarlo (born 1970) is an American Democratic Party politician currently serving as a member of the Connecticut House of Representatives from the 74th district, which includes part of the city of Waterbury since 2021. DiGiovancarlo was first elected to the seat in 2020, defeating incumbent Republican Stephanie Cummings by a 5.8% margin. DiGiovancarlo currently serves on the house's Public Safety and Security Committee, Veteran's Affairs Committee, and the Commerce Committee.

DiGiovancarlo was elected President of the Waterbury Board of Aldermen in December 2023, succeeding long-time president Paul Pernerewski after Pernerewski won the city's mayoral race. DiGiovancarlo has served as a District 4 Alderman for a decade, securing consecutive re-elections, including his most recent win in November 2025.
