= William Pizzuto =

American politician (born 1956)

Member of the Connecticut House of Representatives from the 71st district
- Incumbent
- Assumed office 2022
- Preceded by: Anthony D'Amelio

Personal details
- Born: 1956 (age 69–70)
- Party: Republican
- Education: Central Connecticut State University; University of Connecticut

William Pizzuto (born 1956) is an American Republican Party politician currently serving as a member of the Connecticut House of Representatives from the 71st district, which includes the town of Middlebury and part of the city of Waterbury, since 2022. Following the 2021 resignation of Anthony D'Amelio, Pizzuto was elected to the seat in a February 2022 special election over Democrat John Egan. Pizzuto formerly served as the campus director for the University of Connecticut's Waterbury campus.
