= Post University =

For-profit university in Waterbury, Connecticut, US

Coordinates: 41.5352°N 73.0795°W

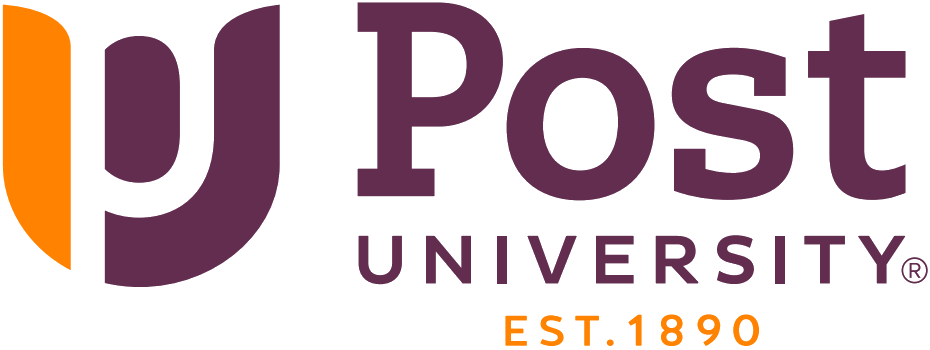
- Former name: List: Matoon Shorthand School (1890–93); Bliss & Harrington's Business College & School of Shorthand (1893–97); Waterbury Business College (1897–1931); Post College (1931–90); Teikyo Post University (1990–2004)
- Motto: "Post Makes It Personal"
- Type: Private for-profit university
- Established: 1890; 136 years ago
- Parent institution: Universidad Andrés Bello
- President: John L. Hopkins
- Students: 7,317
- Location: Waterbury, Connecticut, US
- Campus: Urban 58 acres (23.5 ha)
- Colors: Purple & orange
- Nickname: Eagles
- Sporting affiliations: NCAA Division II – Central Atlantic Collegiate Conference
- Mascot: "Swoop" the Eagle
- Website: post.edu

Post University is a private for-profit university in Waterbury, Connecticut. It was founded in 1890 as Post College. The university offers 60 undergraduate and graduate programs in day, evening, and online courses.

== History ==
Post University was founded in 1890 as Post College. The school offered training in typing, bookkeeping, business writing, and other courses. In 1897, Harry C. Post acquired the school and renamed the school Waterbury Business College, where he became the college's first principal. The school again changed its name in 1931 to Post College, where it would keep its namesake until 1990.

In 1965, the school moved to its current location on Country Club Road in Waterbury, Connecticut. Harold B. Leever was named chair of the board of trustees. The Leever Student Center is named in his honor. The school expanded again by adding the Traurig Library in honor of Rose Traurig. In 1970, the school opened its first off-campus site in Meriden, Connecticut.

In 1976, Post College became a four-year institution and began offering accelerated degree programs aimed at helping Vietnam veterans earn college degrees. In 1980, the college began offering baccalaureate degrees, and a few years later acquired its athletic facilities to support men's and women's varsity sports.

In the 1990s, the school became affiliated with Teikyo University and changed its name to Teikyo Post University. The school began offering distance learning programs in 1997.

Post University is a private, for-profit school; since 2004, it has been a wholly owned subsidiary of Post Education, Inc.

In 2004, the school changed to a new board of trustees and became Post University. The school expanded its liberal arts programs and graduate-level courses. In 2007, Post offered Connecticut's first fully online Master of Business Administration degree program. In 2012, the business school was renamed to Malcolm Baldrige School of Business, after former United States Secretary of Commerce Malcolm Baldrige, Jr.

In 2015, John L. Hopkins was appointed as the CEO of the university.

In 2021, Post University acquired American Sentinel University, a for-profit college with 1400 undergraduate students and 1300 graduate students. The school became American Sentinel College of Nursing and Health Sciences at Post University.

In December 2024, Post University was acquired by Universidad Andrés Bello, a private university based in Santiago, Chile. Despite the change in ownership, Post University retained its name, leadership, and campus operations. University officials stated that the acquisition aimed to enhance access to global academic resources while maintaining the institution's local focus in Waterbury.

== Campus ==
Post University sits on a 58-acre (23.5 ha) campus located near Interstate 84 (Yankee Expressway) in Waterbury, Connecticut.

=== Post Tree ===
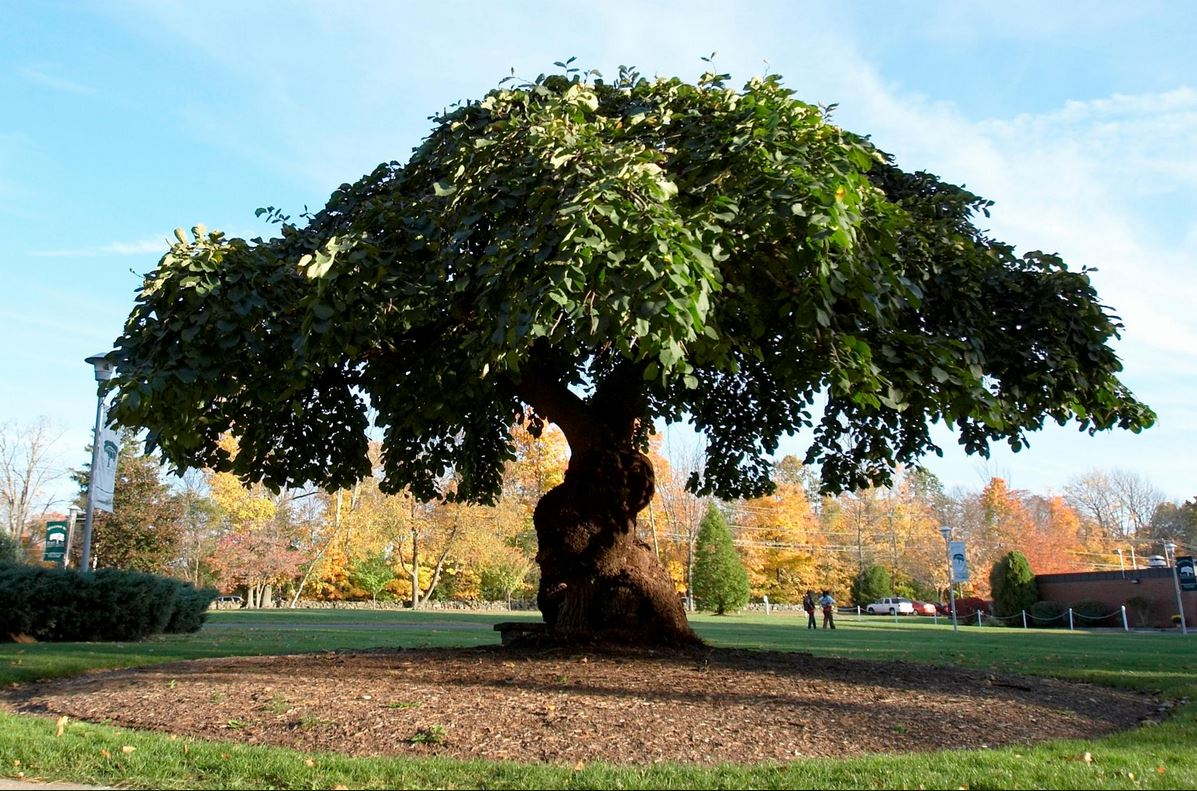
Post University Tree

The Post Tree is a Camperdown elm (Ulmus Camperdownii) that once served as the backdrop for the university's logo. The tree measures 13 feet in height with an average spread of 28 feet. The trunk's circumference is 110 inches. The Post Tree is over a half century old. In 2014, it was added to the list of Connecticut's Notable Trees, and has become part of Connecticut's natural historic record. The elm has been used for student events and as a place to take photos.

=== Student life ===
Post University supports a range of extracurricular activities through student-led organizations, including academic clubs, cultural groups, leadership councils, and recreational programs. In February 2025, Post University announced the addition of a women's flag football varsity program set to begin competition in spring 2026, becoming the first college in Connecticut to sponsor the sport at the collegiate level. The program made its debut in March 2026.

=== Residence halls ===
There are six student residence halls on campus. West Hall houses approximately 100 first-year students and was renovated in 2011. Middle Hall houses approximately 44 first-year students. Paparazzo Hall houses 44 first-year students and was renovated in 2013. South Hall houses approximately 60 upperclassmen students and was renovated in 2012. East Hall houses approximately 60 upperclassmen students. Okinaga Hall is the newest constructed apartment-style residence hall for upperclassmen.

=== Torrance Hall ===
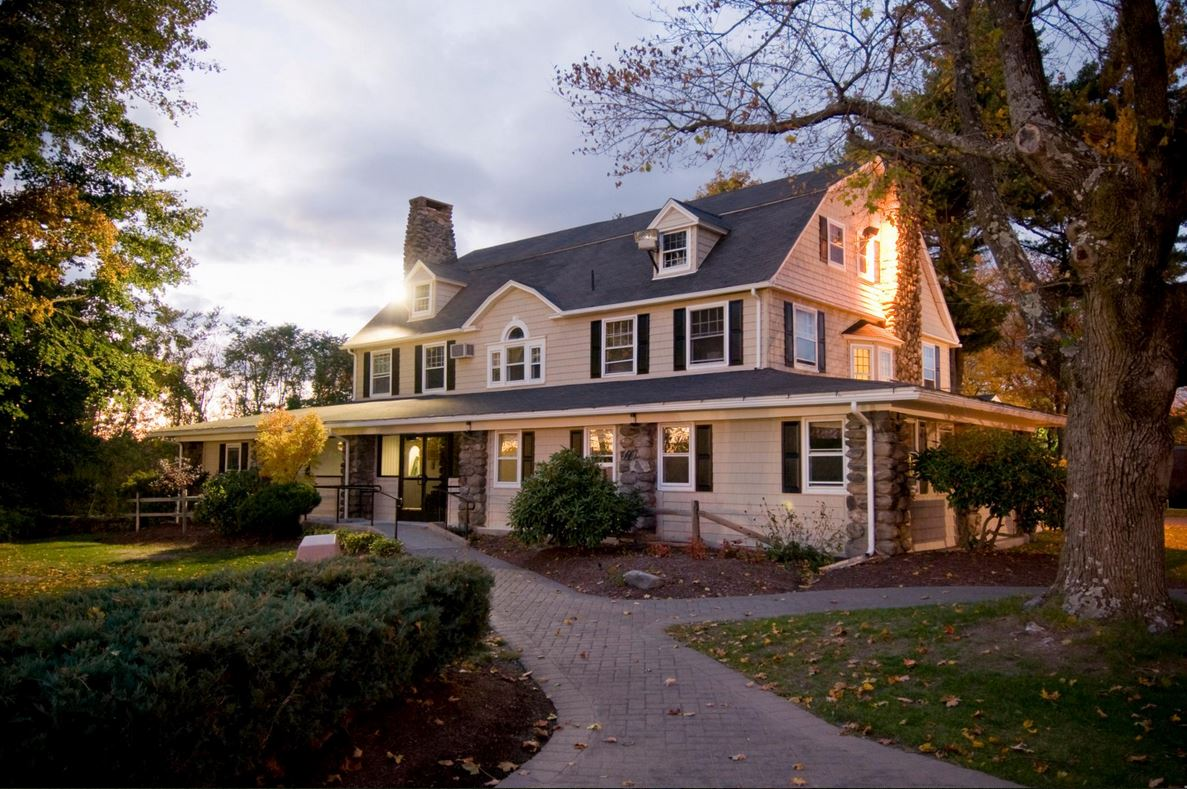
Torrance Hall, president's office of the university

Torrance Hall houses main campus admissions and the president's office. It was the former home to Walter Torrance and family and was renovated in 1965 after a fire destroyed the back of the building.

=== Traurig Library ===
The Traurig Library has one floor and stores over 13,000 books and media, as well as a boardroom for meetings, and the office for academic affairs.

=== Campus halls ===
Hess Hall features classrooms, the registrar, the financial aid office, human resources, and IT. North hall houses Career Services, the Communications Office, Associate Faculty lounge, Commuter Student Lounge, and the Photography Lab. MacDermid Hall has chemistry and biology labs and classrooms, and the university's largest lecture hall. The art department facilities are also found here, including two studio spaces and a ceramics kiln. The Leever Student Center has the Campus Store, Eagle's Nest – common area for special events and club meetings, the dining hall, cyber café, and Counseling Center.

=== LaMoy Field ===
LaMoy Field is a multipurpose facility to support Post's athletic programs and football team. The field was updated to a turf field in 2011. Next to the turf field is the softball field, featuring a turf outfield and a clay infield, and dugouts.

=== Drubner Athletic Center ===
Drubner Athletic Center ("Drub") supports the basketball, volleyball, and tennis teams. The facility also houses the campus fitness center, weight room and esports lab.

== Academics and accreditation ==
Post University offers undergraduate and graduate programs in both on-campus and online formats. Its academic structure consists of four colleges: the American Sentinel College of Nursing & Health Sciences, the John P. Burke School of Public Service and Education, the Malcolm Baldrige School of Business, and the School of Arts & Sciences. The university also offers certificate programs, honors options, and specialized areas of study, including equine studies.

The university employs 155 faculty members on its main campus and 1,075 across its online programs. The average class size is 11 for on-campus courses and 21 for online courses. The student-to-faculty ratio is 6:1 for on-campus students and 18:1 for online learners.

Post University is accredited by the New England Commission of Higher Education (NECHE). The Malcolm Baldrige School of Business is nationally accredited by the Accreditation Council for Business Schools and Programs (ACBSP).

== Administration ==
The organization is a private, for-profit school; since 2004, it has been a wholly owned subsidiary of Post Education, Inc., a Delaware C corporation. John L. Hopkins is the current president and CEO. Don Mroz was president of Post University and was founding dean of the Malcolm Baldrige School of Business. In 2016, John L. Hopkins was named chief executive officer of the university.

== Admissions ==
Post University does not report GPA, SAT, or ACT scores for admitted students to the U.S. Department of Education National Center for Education Statistics. To enroll at the main campus, applicants must provide an attestation confirming high school graduation or equivalent. If an applicant has less than a 2.00 high school cumulative grade point average, a personal statement must be submitted for review by the provost. If approved, the applicant will be provisionally accepted.

== Rankings ==
Academic rankings

Regional
- U.S. News & World Report: 151–165

In 2025, U.S. News & World Report ranked Post Nos. 151–165 out of 171 Regional Universities North, Nos.646-686 out of 686 universities in Nursing, and No.131 out of 165 in Top Performers on Social Mobility.

== Athletics ==
Post University, known athletically as the Eagles, is a member of the National Collegiate Athletic Association Division II, primarily competing in the Central Atlantic Collegiate Conference (CACC). Men's sports include baseball, basketball, cross country, golf, ice hockey, lacrosse, soccer, football, tennis, and track and field; while women's sports include basketball, bowling, cross country, golf, hockey, lacrosse, soccer, softball, tennis, track and field, and volleyball. Non-varsity programs include cheerleading, and equestrian sports. An esports lab was opened on Post University's main campus in 2022.

== Community outreach ==
Post University has been involved in several community-facing initiatives in Greater Waterbury area, including collaborations with local organizations, sponsorship of events, and involvement in community programs. The university sponsors the annual New Year’s Eve fireworks event in downtown Waterbury. In 2016, Post University coordinated a school-supply drive for the Boys & Girls Club of Greater Waterbury.

== Notable alumni ==
Notable Post University alumni

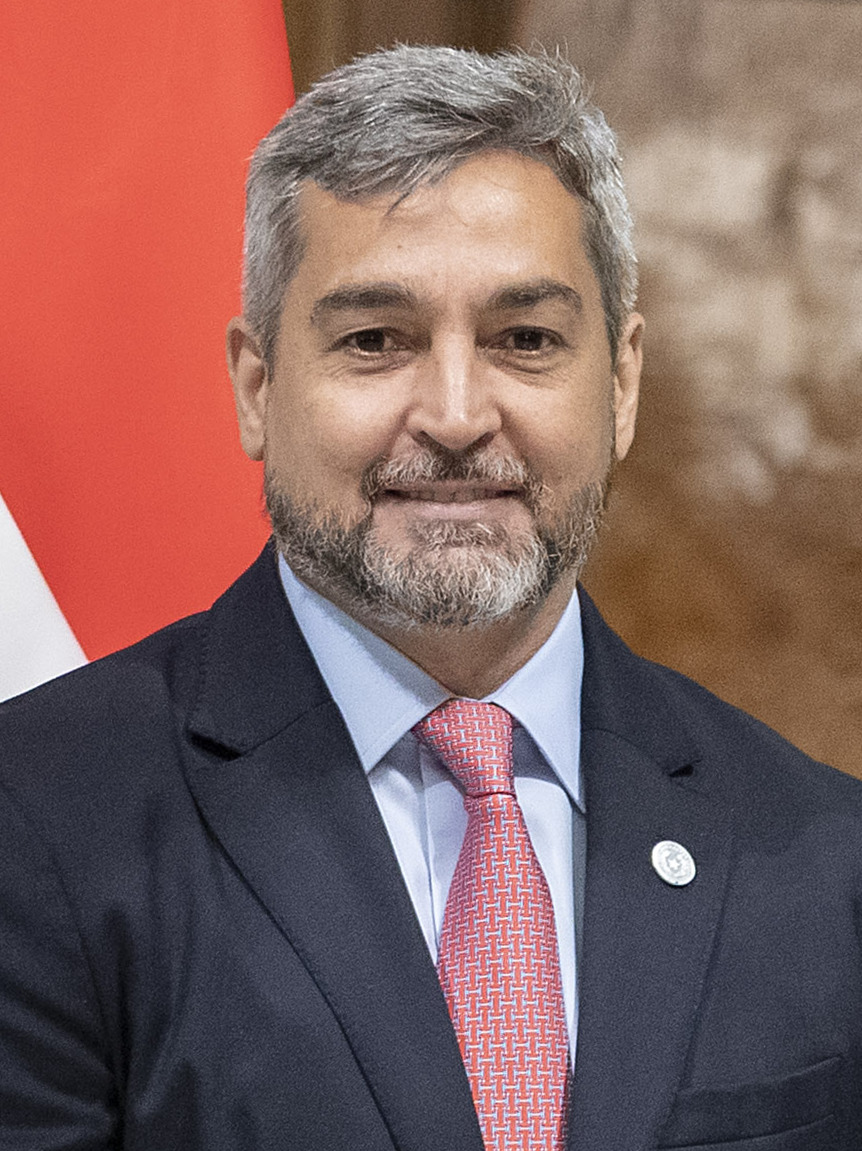
Mario Abdo Benítez, former president of Paraguay

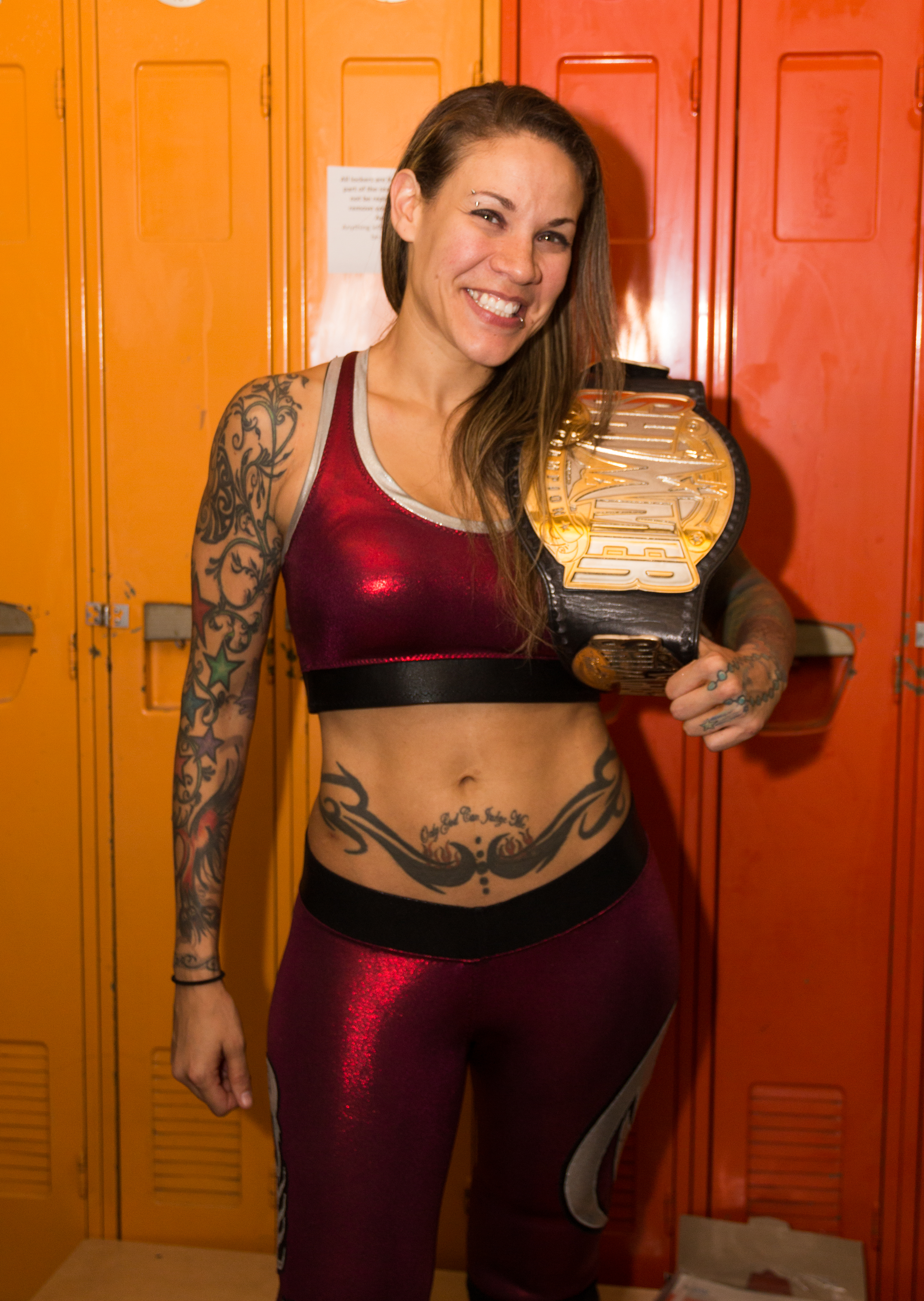
Jazmín Benítez, professional wrestler

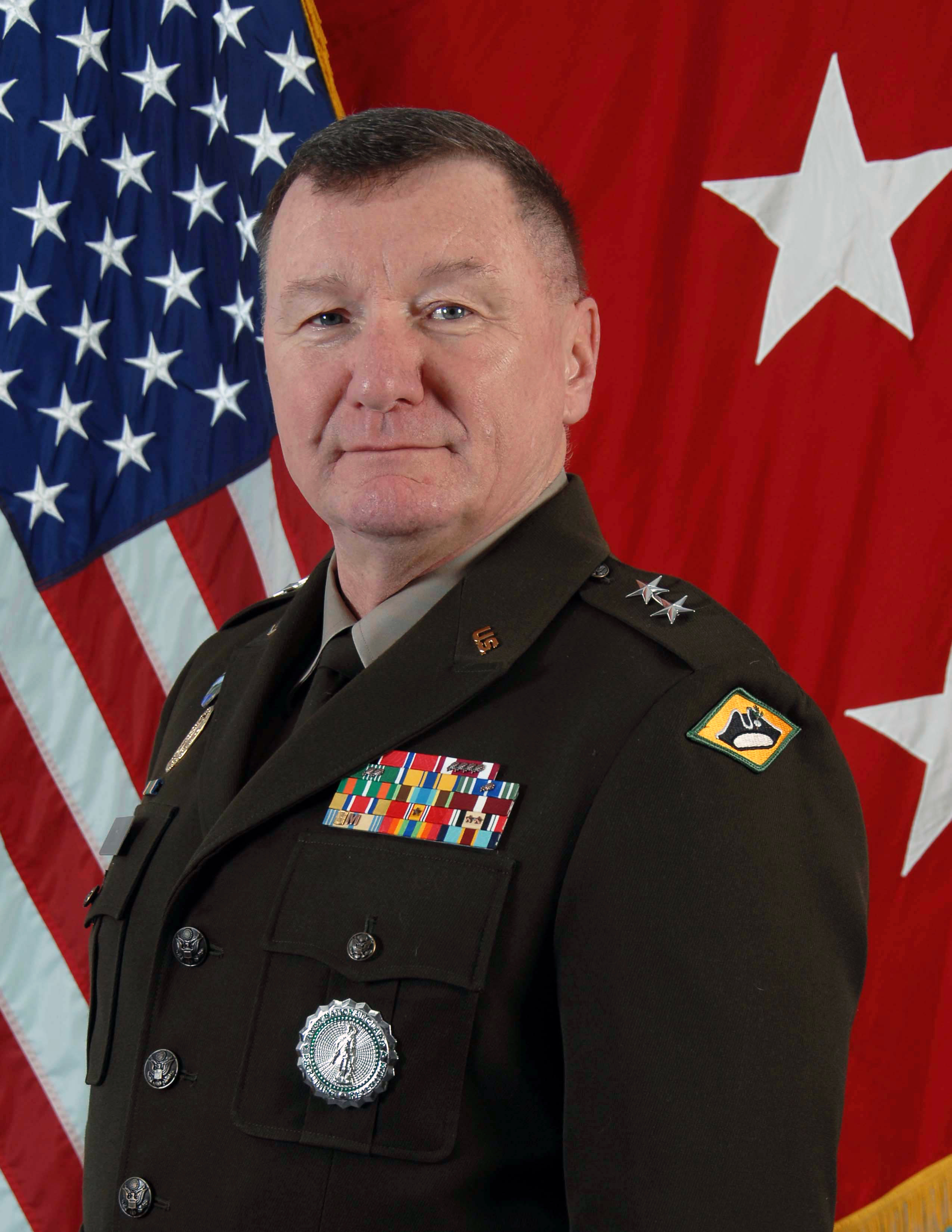
Gregory C. Knight, adjutant general of the Vermont National Guard
- Gregory C. Knight, adjutant general of the Vermont National Guard beginning in 2019
- Jazmín Benítez, professional wrestler better known by her ring name, Mercedes Martinez.
- Mario Abdo Benítez, former president of Paraguay
- Selim Noujaim, former member of the Connecticut House of Representatives
- Michael Jarjura, former mayor of Waterbury, Connecticut
- Donna Veach, member of the Connecticut House of Representatives
