= Norma Cappelletti =

American politician (1925–2014)

Member of the Connecticut House of Representatives from the 71st district
- In office 1981–1983
- Preceded by: Michael R. Colucci
- Succeeded by: Doreen Del Bianco
- In office 1985–1987
- Preceded by: Doreen Del Bianco
- Succeeded by: Doreen Del Bianco

Personal details
- Born: Norma Gloria Leone; June 26, 1925 Waterbury, Connecticut, U.S.
- Died: May 18, 2014 (aged 88) Chapel Hill, North Carolina, U.S.
- Party: Republican
- Spouse: A.J. Cappelletti (m. 1950)

Norma Gloria Cappelletti (June 26, 1925 – May 18, 2014) was an American politician who served in the Connecticut House of Representatives from 1981 to 1983 and 1985 to 1987, representing the 71st district as a Republican. Cappelletti graduated from the Waterbury Hospital School of Nursing and subsequently taught there. She lived in Waterbury during her tenure and later moved to Pinehurst, North Carolina.
