= Selim Noujaim =

American politician

Member of the Connecticut House of Representatives from the 74th district
- In office 2002–2017
- Preceded by: Michael Jarjura
- Succeeded by: Stephanie Cummings

Personal details
- Born: Lebanon
- Party: Republican
- Spouse: Linda

Selim Noujaim was a member of the Connecticut House of Representatives. He is the Executive Vice President of Noujaim Tools.

== Biography ==
Noujaim was born on November 25, 1948. Noujaim emigrated to the United States in 1971 from Lebanon, and is Catholic . He graduated from Post University, Central Connecticut State University and the University of New Haven.

== Political career ==
Noujaim was first elected to the House of Representatives in 2002. He is still a registered Republican.

== Community involvement ==
Noujaim has served as chairman of the Board of Directors of Seven Angels Theater; Chairman of Saints Peter and Paul Church Parish Council; Chairman of the Economic Development and Manufacturer's Councils; and as the President of the Maassir Lebanese-American Charitable Society. He also co-chaired the 2001-2002 United Way Campaign Cabinet and is a former member of the Workforce Connections/Private Industry Council.

Noujaim is a member of multiple local organisations, clubs and boards of local institutions of diverse nature. Presenting a commitment to the community lasting decades, Noujaim was honoured with multiple local awards and parades.

Noujaim was appointed Commissioner of the Waterbury Police Department. His term started on 01.01.2024 and will end by 12.31.2027.

== Spouse ==
His spouse Linda Noujaim for 34 years was a Special Education Teacher that helped families and their kids, suffering from mental disabilities. She continues to care for the community with Selim.
