= Harry L. Garrigus =

American educator, animal scientist, and breeder

Harry Lucian Garrigus
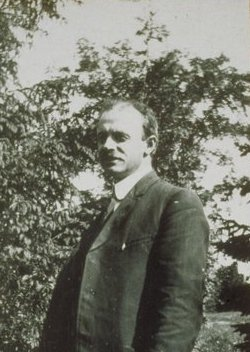
- Born: August 18, 1876; Wolcott, Connecticut, US
- Died: July 10, 1968 (aged 91); Storrs, Connecticut, US
- Occupation: Professor of Animal Husbandry

Academic background
- Education: University of Connecticut (BS); University of Guelph

Academic work
- Discipline: Animal sciences
- Institutions: University of Connecticut

Harry Lucian Garrigus (August 18, 1876 – July 10, 1968) was an American animal scientist, livestock breeder, and educator who worked at the University of Connecticut (UConn) from 1900 to 1942. Garrigus served as Professor of Animal Husbandry from 1907 until his retirement. Two of his sons and one of his grandsons followed in his footsteps, teaching animal sciences at public universities in the Upper South and Midwest.

== Early life and education ==
Garrigus was born in Wolcott, Connecticut, on August 18, 1876 to parents Jacob Henry Garrigus and Sophronia E. (Upson) Garrigus. He was the third of six children. He enrolled in Storrs Agricultural College in 1895 and graduated in 1898. He stayed in Storrs for a year as a veterinary assistant. After a summer overseeing the livestock at an estate in Tarrytown, New York, he worked at Baron Hirsch School in Woodbine, New Jersey. Subsequently, he pursued advanced studies at Ontario Agricultural College, whose livestock programs had a strong reputation.

== Career ==
Garrigus returned to Storrs on November 1, 1900 to join the Storrs Agricultural Experiment Station staff at the invite of station director Charles Phelps. Garrigus became chair of the college's department of animal husbandry in 1907 and became a full professor in 1912. For over thirty years, he ran the college's farm, built robust livestock herds and flocks, and bred Morgan horses. Garrigus's prize Percheron stallion, Dragon, Jr., held a considerable reputation in farming circles and earned more than six thousand dollars for the college in service fees and sale of offspring.

Described as a shrewd "Yankee trader" by colleague Walter Stemmons, Garrigus arranged for titles on properties adjacent to the college to be held in trust until the state could acquire them. He gradually expanded the college's holdings from about 300 acres to more than 1,500 acres.

Garrigus was an in-demand livestock judge who traveled widely to study animal husbandry and attend livestock shows. He judged horses, beef cattle, dairy cattle, sheep, and pigs from Nova Scotia to Chicago and Kansas City. He advised farmers all over New England, New York, and New Jersey. Writing for the American Society of Animal Science, Garrigus's sons recalled their father having the epithet "Animal Husbandman of the East."

Garrigus participated in the Percheron Society of America, American Berkshire Association, Milking Shorthorn Society, Connecticut Dairymen's Association, Connecticut Swine Growers Association, American Genetic Association, American Society of Animal Production, and Eastern States Exposition. He also served as the national president of Lambda Gamma Delta. Locally, Garrigus was a member of the Storrs Congregational Church, a Mason, and a Rotarian and was active in civic affairs.

== Legacy ==
Two of his sons, Wesley Patterson Garrigus (1909–1985) and Upson S. Garrigus (1917–2004), followed in his footsteps. Upson served as professor of animal science at the University of Illinois Urbana–Champaign from 1948 to 1987. Wesley served as professor of animal husbandry at the University of Kentucky from 1937 to 1974. In 1959, he served as president of the American Society of Animal Science. The Wesley P. Garrigus Building at UK's Lexington campus was named in his honor. Wesley's son, Robert R. Garrigus (d. 2016), was professor of animal sciences for five years at Purdue University and 34 years at Middle Tennessee State University. MTSU honored him through the establishment of the Robert Garrigus Scholarship Endowment Fund.

Like Jerauld Manter, Garrigus was an amateur photographer who documented campus life. UConn's Archives and Special Collections hold more than 1,300 of Garrigus's photographic plates.

The Harry Lucian Garrigus Suites, a coeducational residence hall on UConn's Storrs campus, was named in his honor in 2006.

== Personal life ==
Garrigus married Bertha May Patterson (1881–1941) in 1899. The couple had four sons and one daughter. After the death of his first wife in 1941, Garrigus married Cora Grant (1887–1978).

Harry L. Garrigus died on July 10, 1968, at his home in Storrs. He was interred at the New Storrs Cemetery, on a hill overlooking UConn's campus.
