= Connecticut's 71st House of Representatives district =

American legislative district

Connecticut's 71st State House of Representatives district
Representative
William Pizzuto; R

Connecticut's 71st House of Representatives district elects one member of the Connecticut House of Representatives. It consists of the town of Middlebury and parts of Waterbury. It has been represented by Republican William Pizzuto since 2022.

== List of representatives ==
List of representatives from Connecticut's 71st State House district
Representative	Party	Years	District home	Note
Merritt M. Comstock	Republican	1967–1973	Essex	
Michael R. Colucci	Democratic	1973–1981	Waterbury	Redistricted from the 88th District
Norma Cappelletti	Republican	1981–1983	Waterbury	
Doreen Del Bianco	Democratic	1983–1985	Waterbury	
Norma Cappelletti	Republican	1985–1987	Waterbury	
Doreen Del Bianco	Democratic	1987–1993	Waterbury	
Donald J. Davino	Democratic	1993	Waterbury	Died in a car accident during term of office
Robert J. Davino	Democratic	1993–1995	Waterbury	
Philip Giordano	Republican	1995	Waterbury	Later served as Mayor of Waterbury
Anthony D'Amelio	Republican	1996–2021	Waterbury	Resigned at the end of 2021
William Pizzuto	Republican	2022–present	Middlebury	

== Recent elections ==
=== 2026 ===
2026 Connecticut House of Representatives District 71 General Election
Party	Candidate	Votes	%
Republican	TBD	TBD	TBD
Democratic	Stephen Ferrucci III	TBD	TBD
	Total Votes	TBD	TBD
Results: TBD	Winner: TBD	TBD	TBD

=== 2026 Republican Primary ===
2026 Connecticut House of Representatives District 71 Republican Primary Election
Party	Candidate	Votes	%
Republican	William Pizzuto (Incumbent)	TBD	TBD
Republican	Mike Grosso	TBD	TBD
	Total Votes	TBD	TBD
Results: TBD	Winner: TBD	TBD	TBD

=== 2024 ===
2024 Connecticut House of Representatives District 71 election
Party	Candidate	Votes	%
Republican	William Pizzuto (Incumbent) Unopposed*	6,936	100.0
	Total Votes	6,936	100.0
Republican Hold	Winner: William Pizzuto (Incumbent)	6,936	100.0

=== 2022 Regular ===
2022 Connecticut House of Representatives District 71 regular election
Party	Candidate	Votes	%
Republican	William Pizzuto (Incumbent) Unopposed*	5,346	100.0
	Total Votes	5,346	100.0
Republican Hold	Winner: William Pizzuto (Incumbent)	5,346	100.0

=== 2022 special ===
2022 Connecticut House of Representatives District 71 Special election
Party	Candidate	Votes	%
Republican	William Pizzuto	1,430	73.6
Democratic	John M. Egan	512	26.4
Total votes		1,942	100.00
Republican hold			

=== 2020 ===
2020 Connecticut State House of Representatives election, District 71
Party	Candidate	Votes	%
Republican	Anthony D'Amelio (incumbent)	7,501	100.00
Republican hold			

=== 2018 ===
2018 Connecticut House of Representatives Elections, district 71
Party	Candidate	Votes	%
Republican	Anthony D'Amelio (Incumbent)	5,018	59.0
Democratic	Stephen Ferucci III	3,158	37.1
Independent Party	Danielle Albert	334	3.9
Total votes		8,510	100.00
Republican hold			

=== 2016 ===
2016 Connecticut House of Representatives Elections, District 71
Party	Candidate	Votes	%
Republican	Anthony D'Amelio (Incumbent)	6,302	79.87
Independent Party	Danielle Albert	1,588	20.13
Total votes		7,890	100.00
Republican hold			

=== 2014 ===
2014 Connecticut House of Representatives Elections, District 71
Party	Candidate	Votes	%
Republican	Anthony D'Amelio (Incumbent)	4,623	84.3
Independent Party	Raymond E. Rivard	861	15.7
Total votes		5,484	100.00
Republican hold			

=== 2012 ===
2012 Connecticut House of Representatives Elections, District 71
Party	Candidate	Votes	%
Republican	Anthony D'Amelio (Incumbent)	5,410	60.0
Democratic	Ernest Brunelli	3,610	40.0
Total votes		9,020	100.00
Republican hold			
