= Gale Mastrofrancesco =

American politician

Member of the Connecticut House of Representatives from the 80th district
- Incumbent
- Assumed office January 9, 2019
- Preceded by: Robert Sampson

Personal details
- Born: October 25, 1960 (age 65)
- Party: Republican

Gale Mastrofrancesco (born October 25, 1960) is an American politician who has served in the Connecticut House of Representatives from the 80th district since 2019.
