= Stephanie Cummings =

American politician

Member of the Connecticut House of Representatives from the 74th district
- In office 2017–2021
- Preceded by: Selim Noujaim
- Succeeded by: Michael DiGiovancarlo

Personal details
- Born: Waterbury, Connecticut, U.S.
- Party: Republican

Stephanie Cummings is an American politician who served as a Republican member of the Connecticut House of Representatives from the 74th district between January 2017 and January 2021.

Her district covered Waterbury's East End and East Mountain neighbourhoods.

She lost her seat to Democrat Michael DiGiovancarlo in 2020.
