= Connecticut's 74th House of Representatives district =

American legislative district

Connecticut's 74th State House of Representatives district
Representative
| Michael DiGiovancarlo; D |

Connecticut's 74th House of Representatives district elects one member of the Connecticut House of Representatives. It encompasses parts of Waterbury and has been represented by Democrat Michael DiGiovancarlo since 2021.

== List of representatives ==
List of Representatives from Connecticut's 74th State House District
| Representative | Party | Years | District home | Note |
|---|---|---|---|---|
| Raymond J. Dzialo | Democratic | 1967–1973 | Middletown | Seat created |
| James J. Palmieri | Democratic | 1973–1981 | Waterbury | |
| Thomas P. Brunnock | Democratic | 1981–1985 | Waterbury | |
| Louis Orsini | Republican | 1985–1987 | Waterbury | |
| Elizabeth Brown | Democratic | 1987–1993 | Waterbury | |
| Michael Jarjura | Democratic | 1993–2003 | Waterbury | |
| Selim Noujaim | Republican | 2003–2017 | Waterbury | |
| Stephanie Cummings | Republican | 2017–2021 | Waterbury | |
| Michael DiGiovancarlo | Democratic | 2021– | Waterbury | |

== Recent elections ==
=== 2026 ===
2026 Connecticut State House of Representatives election, District 74
| Party | Candidate | Votes | % |
|---|---|---|---|
| Democratic | Michael DiGiovancarlo (Incumbent) | TBD | TBD |
| Republican | Ollie Gray III | TBD | TBD |
| Independent | Michael DiGiovancarlo (Incumbent) | TBD | TBD |
| Write In | Domenic Davino Jr. | TBD | TBD |
| | Total Votes | TBD | TBD |
| Results: TBD | Winner: TBD | TBD | TBD |

=== 2024 ===
2024 Connecticut State House of Representatives election, District 74
| Party | Candidate | Votes | % |
|---|---|---|---|
| Democratic | Michael DiGiovancarlo (Incumbent) Unopposed* | 4,817 | 100.0 |
| | Total Votes | 4,817 | 100.0 |
| Democratic Hold | Winner: Michael DiGiovancarlo (Incumbent) | 4,817 | 100.0 |

=== 2022 ===
2022 Connecticut State House of Representatives election, District 74
| Party | Candidate | Votes | % |
|---|---|---|---|
| Democratic | Michael DiGiovancarlo (Incumbent) Unopposed* | 3,185 | 100.0 |
| | Total Votes | 3,185 | 100.0 |
| Democratic Hold | Winner: Michael DiGiovancarlo (Incumbent) | 3,185 | 100.0 |

=== 2020 ===
2020 Connecticut State House of Representatives election, District 74
| Party | Candidate | Votes | % |
|---|---|---|---|
| Democratic | Michael DiGiovancarlo | 4,261 | 50.56 |
| Republican | Stephanie Cummings (incumbent) | 3,539 | 42.00 |
| Independent Party | Stephanie Cummings (incumbent) | 431 | 5.11 |
| Working Families | Michael DiGiovancarlo | 196 | 2.33 |
| Total votes | | 8,427 | 100.00 |
| Democratic gain from Republican | | | |

=== 2018 ===
2018 Connecticut House of Representatives election, District 74
| Party | Candidate | Votes | % |
|---|---|---|---|
| Republican | Stephanie Cummings (Incumbent) | 3,409 | 54.2 |
| Democratic | Wendy Tyson-Wood | 2,877 | 45.8 |
| Total votes | | 6,286 | 100.00 |
| Republican hold | | | |

=== 2016 ===
2016 Connecticut House of Representatives election, District 74
| Party | Candidate | Votes | % |
|---|---|---|---|
| Republican | Stephanie Cummings | 4,186 | 55.44 |
| Democratic | Wendy Tyson-Wood | 3,365 | 44.56 |
| Total votes | | 7,551 | 100.00 |
| Republican hold | | | |

=== 2014 ===
2014 Connecticut House of Representatives election, District 74
| Party | Candidate | Votes | % |
|---|---|---|---|
| Republican | Selim Noujaim (Incumbent) | 3,228 | 86.3 |
| Independent Party | Margaret A. O'Brien | 511 | 13.7 |
| Total votes | | 3,739 | 100.00 |
| Republican hold | | | |

=== 2014 ===
2012 Connecticut House of Representatives election, District 74
| Party | Candidate | Votes | % |
|---|---|---|---|
| Republican | Selim Noujaim (Incumbent) | 4,235 | 81.2 |
| Independent Party | Joseph P. Nolan | 983 | 18.8 |
| Total votes | | 5,218 | 100.00 |
| Republican hold | | | |
