= Elizabeth Brown (politician) =

American politician

Member of the Connecticut House of Representatives from the 74th district
- In office 1987–1993
- Preceded by: Louis Orsini
- Succeeded by: Michael Jarjura

Personal details
- Party: Democratic

Elizabeth Crichton Brown is an American politician who served in the Connecticut House of Representatives from 1987 to 1993, representing the 74th district as a Democrat. She lived in Waterbury during her tenure. Brown was elected to the Waterbury Board of Education in 2011, she has served as President of the board since December 2025.
