= Sam Caligiuri =

American politician

Sam S. F. Caligiuri
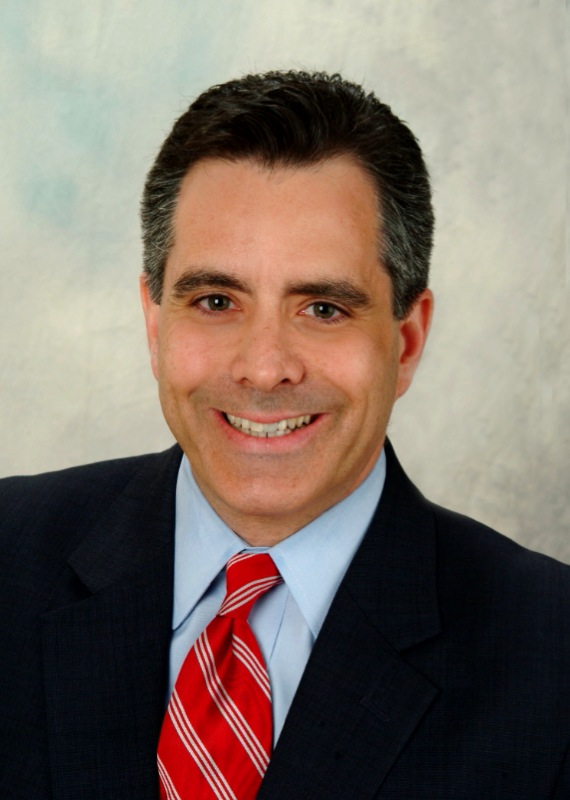

Member of the Connecticut State Senate from the 16th district
- In office January 2007 – January 2011
- Preceded by: Chris Murphy
- Succeeded by: Joe Markley

Mayor of Waterbury, Connecticut
- Acting; July 26, 2001 – January 1, 2002
- Preceded by: Philip Giordano
- Succeeded by: Michael Jarjura

Personal details
- Born: August 23, 1966 (age 60) Waterbury, Connecticut, U.S.
- Party: Republican
- Spouse: Lori Caligiuri
- Children: 2
- Education: Boston College (BA); Yale University (MA); Catholic University (JD)

Sam S. F. Caligiuri (born August 23, 1966) is an American lawyer and former Connecticut State Senator. In 2010, he ran for the Republican nomination for U.S. Senate, but switched to a House seat in Connecticut's 5th congressional district. He was ultimately unsuccessful, losing behind Chris Murphy, 54-46%.

In November 2006, Caligiuri was elected to the Connecticut State Senate to represent the 16th District, which comprises the eastern half of Waterbury as well as the city's eastern suburbs of Cheshire, Southington, and Wolcott.

== Legal career ==
A native of Waterbury, he is a former partner with the Hartford office of Day Pitney, Connecticut's largest law firm. He received a B.A. from Boston College, a master's degree from Yale University, and a Juris Doctor degree from Catholic University of America School of Law. His law practice is focused on public finance.

Caligiuri served as deputy legal counsel to former Connecticut Governor John G. Rowland during Rowland's first term, before entering private practice prior to Rowland's landslide re-election in 1998 over then-Congresswoman Barbara Kennelly. He then ran for alderman in Waterbury and had been serving as president of Waterbury's board of aldermen when he was called upon to succeed Mayor Philip Giordano upon Giordano's arrest on charges of illegal conduct with children. Under the city's charter, the president of the board of aldermen becomes the acting mayor of the city when the sitting mayor becomes incapacitated. Caligiuri became the acting mayor when Giordano was arrested. Caligiuri swung into action immediately to restore confidence. He selected a chief of staff and put a plan in place to lead Waterbury through this difficult period. Caligiuri took a leave of absence from his law practice and served full-time for the remainder of his predecessor's term, which ended on December 31, 2001.

== Connecticut Senate ==
Caligiuri's 2006 state senate victory was a rare bright spot for Connecticut's Republicans taking a previously Democratic seat. The departing incumbent from the 16th District, Democrat Chris Murphy, was vacating the seat to successfully challenge incumbent Republican Congresswoman Nancy Johnson.

Caligiuri was the lone Republican in the legislature to vote against the final version of the 2007–08 state budget. He opposed exceeding the state's constitutional spending cap.

In July 2007 Caligiuri demanded a moratorium on further paroles in Connecticut following the home invasion murders of the Petit family by two paroled convicts. Investigation by the Hartford Courant revealed irregularities in the Connecticut parole process. In September 2007, Governor M. Jodi Rell announced a moratorium on the parole of violent offenders. On January 22, 2008 a special session was held which passed laws declaring home invasion a Class A felony and reforming the parole board. Caligiuri was the prime sponsor of a proposed Three Strikes Law in Connecticut, which was not adopted in the special session.

== Political campaigns ==
=== 2010 ===
Caligiuri challenged Democratic incumbent Chris Murphy in Connecticut's 5th congressional district.

Caligiuri first planned to challenge Democratic incumbent Chris Dodd in the 2010 U.S. Senate election, as he indicated in February 2009. On March 18, 2009, he filed his paperwork with the Federal Election Commission to run for the seat. On March 31, 2009, Caligiuri formally announced his candidacy for the U.S. House of Representatives instead, although he didn't formally end his Senate campaign until November 24, 2009. On May 21, 2010, Caligiuri received the state Republican Party's endorsement at its convention by winning 68% of the delegate votes on the first ballot. On August 10, 2010, Caligiuri defeated challengers Justin Bernier and Mark Greenberg in the Republican primary.

In the November 2 general election, Caligiuri lost to incumbent Murphy by a 54% to 46% margin.

Political offices
Preceded by Philip Giordano	Mayor of Waterbury, Connecticut (Acting); 2001–2002	Succeeded by Michael Jarjura
Connecticut State Senate
Preceded by Chris Murphy	Member of the Connecticut State Senate from the 16th district 2007–2011	Succeeded by Joe Markley
