= 2000 United States Senate election in Connecticut =

- November 7, 2000
- Turnout: 77.54%
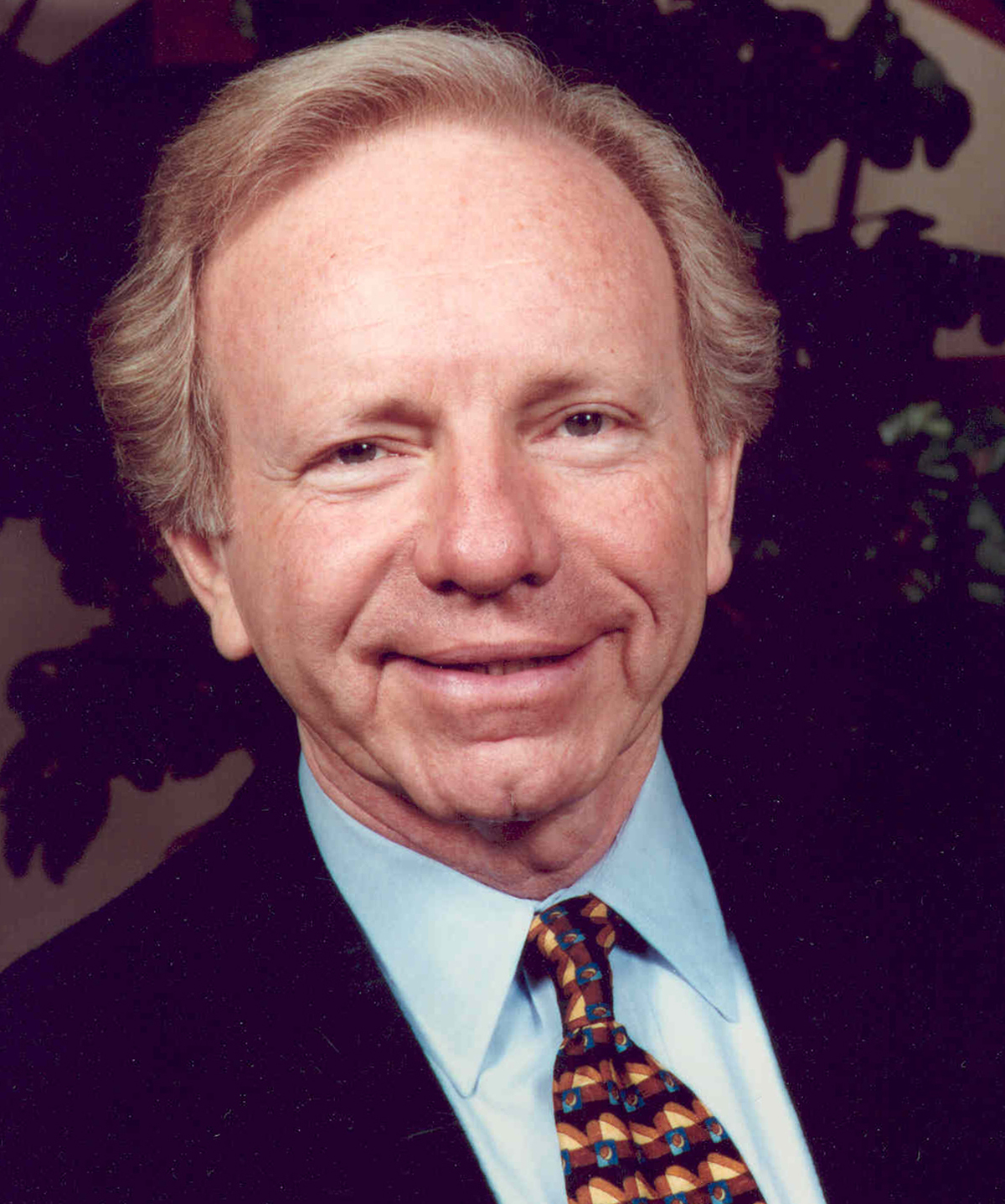

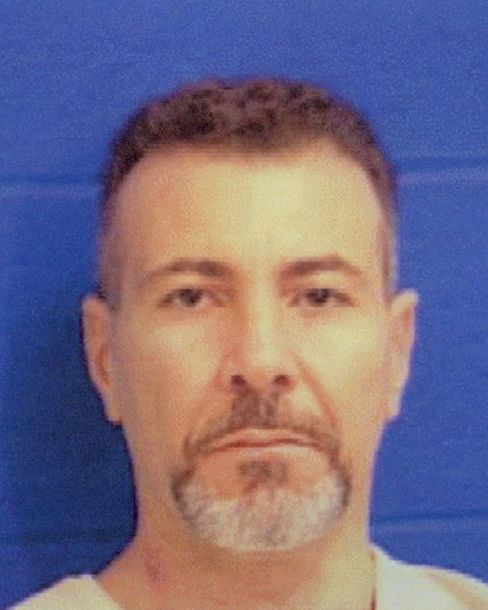
Nominee	Joe Lieberman	Philip Giordano
Party	Democratic	Republican
Popular vote	828,902	448,077
Percentage	63.21%	34.17%
- Lieberman: 40–50% 50–60% 60–70% 70–80% 80–90% Giordano: 50–60%
U.S. senator before election
Joe Lieberman
Democratic
Elected U.S. Senator
Joe Lieberman
Democratic

The 2000 United States Senate election in Connecticut took place on November 7, 2000. Democratic incumbent Joe Lieberman, who was also the Democratic nominee for vice president in the concurrent presidential election, was re-elected to a third term in a landslide over Waterbury mayor Phil Giordano.

== Background ==
While running for re-election to the Senate, Lieberman was also the Democratic nominee for vice president in the concurrent presidential election, as the chosen running mate of presidential nominee Al Gore. Had the Gore-Lieberman ticket won, Lieberman would have resigned his Senate seat (regardless of the result of this election) prior to becoming vice president. The Senate vacancy would have been filled through a 2002 special election, and Republican governor John G. Rowland would have appointed an interim replacement to serve until such election.

== General election ==
=== Candidates ===
- Joe Lieberman, incumbent U.S. senator since 1989 (Democratic)
- Philip Giordano, Waterbury mayor and former state representative (Republican)
- Wildey J. Moore (Libertarian)
- William Kozak Jr. (Concerned Citizens)

=== Campaign ===
Lieberman, a popular centrist incumbent, focused on his vice presidential campaign. He refused to attend any debates. Giordano was a heavy underdog, as he was ignored by the press and he debated alone.

=== Polling ===
Poll source	Date(s)	Sample size	Margin of error	Joe Lieberman (D)	Phil Giordano (R)	Other / undecided (Note: Calculated by taking the difference of 100% and all other candidates combined.)
Harris Insights & Analytics	November 3, 2000	2,504	—	61%	34%	5%

=== Results ===
General election results
Party	Candidate	Votes	%	±%
Democratic	Joe Lieberman (incumbent)	828,902	63.21%	−3.83%
Republican	Philip Giordano	448,077	34.17%	+3.16%
Concerned Citizens	William Kozak	25,509	1.95%	+0.02%
Libertarian	Wildey J. Moore	8,773	0.67%	+0.13%
Total votes		1,311,261	100.00%	N/A
Democratic hold				

==== By county ====
County	Joe Lieberman Democratic		Phil Giordano Republican		Various candidates Other parties		Margin		Total votes cast
County	#	%	#	%	#	%	#	%	Total votes cast
Fairfield	199,960	59.9%	126,961	38.0%	6,955	2.1%	72,999	21.9%	333,876
Hartford	214,834	64.7%	108,231	32.6%	8,831	2.7%	106,603	32.1%	331,896
Litchfield	44,841	57.3%	30,678	39.2%	2,749	3.5%	14,163	18.1%	78,268
Middlesex	43,388	62.6%	24,247	35.0%	1,636	2.3%	19,141	27.6%	69,271
New Haven	207,670	67.6%	91,226	29.7%	8,161	2.7%	116,444	37.9%	307,057
New London	61,351	63.2%	32,754	33.7%	2,976	3.0%	28,597	29.5%	97,081
Tolland	33,007	59.5%	20,868	37.6%	1,604	2.8%	12,139	21.9%	55,479
Windham	23,851	62.2%	13,112	34.2%	1,370	3.6%	10,739	28.0%	38,333
Totals	828,920	63.21%	448,077	34.17%	34,282	2.62%	380,843	29.04%	1,311,279

=== By congressional district ===
Lieberman won all six congressional districts, including three that elected Republicans.

District	Lieberman	Giordano	Representative
1st	66%	31%	John Larson
2nd	63%	34%	Sam Gejdenson (106th Congress)
2nd	63%	34%	Rob Simmons (107th Congress)
3rd	69%	29%	Rosa DeLauro
4th	62%	36%	Chris Shays
5th	60%	37%	James Maloney
6th	60%	38%	Nancy Johnson

== Aftermath ==
Because the Gore-Lieberman ticket lost the presidency to George W. Bush, Lieberman returned to the Senate and remained there until his retirement in 2013. This was the last Senate election in which Lieberman formally ran as the Democratic nominee. In 2006, he ran on the Connecticut for Lieberman ticket following his loss in the Democratic Party primary.

In July 2001, Giordano was arrested on municipal corruption charges. After he reached a plea bargain with federal prosecutors to implicate members of the Genovese crime family, he was charged separately with arranging sexual contact with children. He was sentenced to 37 years in federal prison, as well as a concurrent 18 year sentence on state charges. As of 2026, he is serving his sentence at Federal Correctional Institution, Englewood. His conviction has been repeatedly upheld and he is eligible for release no sooner than July 2032.

== See also ==
- 2000 United States Senate elections
