= Joe Markley =

American politician

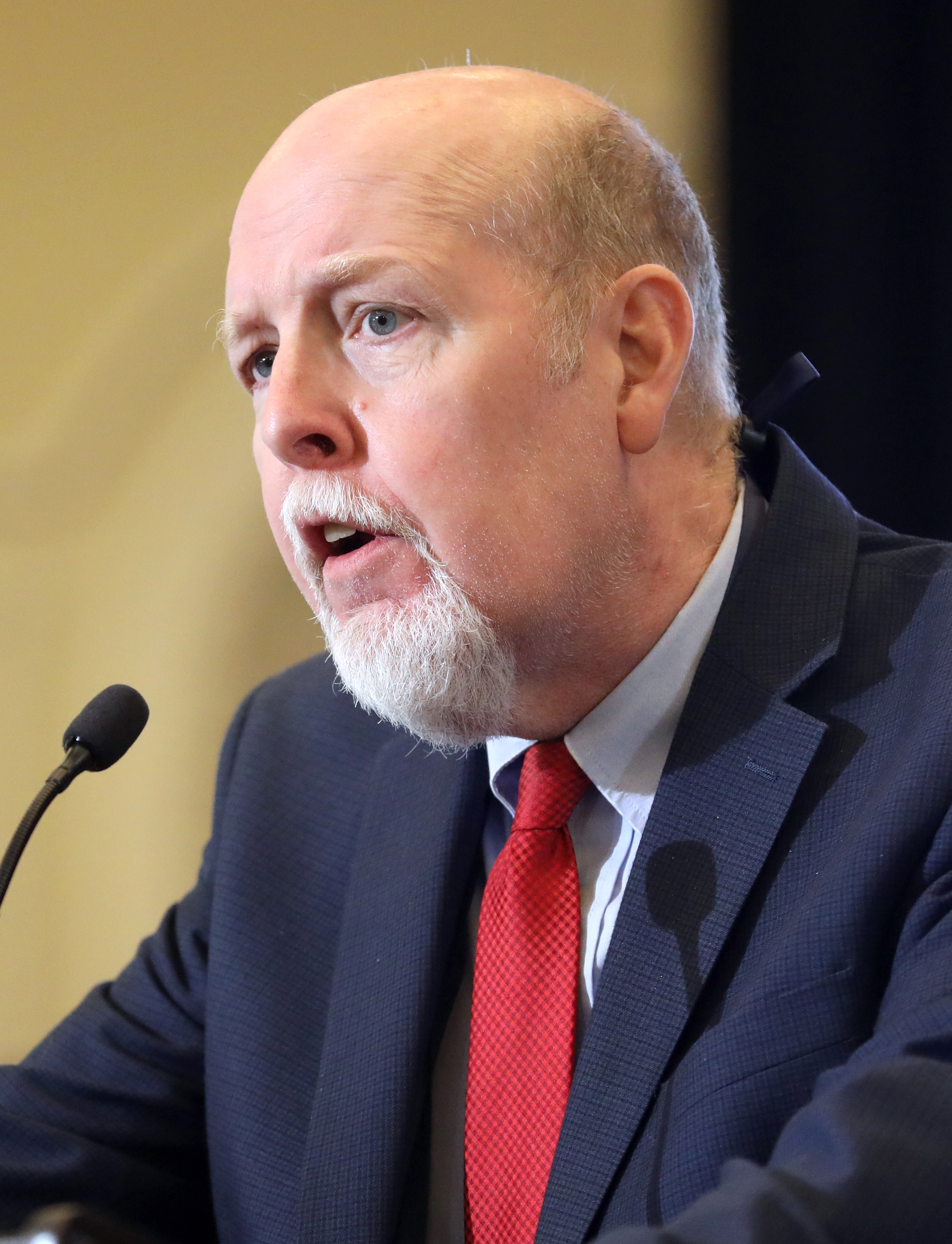

Member of the Connecticut State Senate from the 16th district
- In office January 2011 – January 2019
- Preceded by: Sam Caligiuri
- Succeeded by: Robert Sampson
- In office January 1985 – January 1987
- Preceded by: William J. Sullivan
- Succeeded by: Donald Rinaldi

Personal details
- Born: November 28, 1956 (age 69) Southington, Connecticut, U.S.
- Party: Republican
- Education: Amherst College (BA); Columbia University (MA)

Joe Markley (born November 28, 1956) is an American politician who was a member of the Connecticut State Senate representing the 16th State Senate District from 2011 to 2019. A native of Southington, Connecticut, he was first elected to the State Senate in 1984 at the age of 27, serving only one term. He returned to the chamber in 2010 at the age of 53, but left again in 2019. He was the Republican Nominee for Lieutenant Governor of Connecticut in 2018, but lost the general election to Democrat Susan Bysiewicz.

== Early life ==
Joe Markley was born in Southington, Connecticut on November 28, 1956. Through his mother, Priscilla Cowles, his family has resided continuously in the town since the 1730s. Markley attended Southington High School, graduating in 1974. He then earned his bachelor's degree from Amherst College and his master's degree in English from Columbia University.

== Political career ==
=== First State Senate stint ===
On November 6, 1984, Markley, a member of the Republican Party was first elected to the Connecticut State Senate due in part to the Reagan landslide of 1984 where President Reagan carried over 60% of the vote in the state. He ran for re-election in 1986, but was defeated – consistent with the national trend of the 1986 midterm elections where Democrats made gains throughout the country.

=== Twenty-four year hiatus ===
When Lowell Weicker proposed a state income tax for Connecticut in 1991, Markley, along with Tom Scott formed the Connecticut Taxpayers Committee to spearhead the opposition. On October 5, 1991 they organized the largest rally in Connecticut history to be held on the grounds of the state capitol.

Markley also returned to teaching where he taught English at the high school and college levels.

=== Second State Senate stint ===
Markley returned to the State Senate after defeating Democrat John Barry in 2010 and was narrowly re-elected in 2012 before posting substantial victory margins in 2014 and 2016. His outspoken criticism of then-Governor Dannel Malloy led to speculation that he might run as a gubernatorial candidate in 2018.

=== Campaign for party chairman ===
Markley announced his intention to seek the Connecticut Republican Party chairmanship after incumbent Jerry Labriola, Jr. announced he would not seek re-election after failing to capitalize on the nationwide republican momentum to defeat Governor Malloy or any congressional seat in the 2014 mid-term elections. Markley's platform for chairman was not to rebrand the party but to rejuvenate support for the party at the state level. "Many national donors who live in Connecticut have given up on the state party. They must be convinced that we are worthy of their support, both because we stand for a genuine change in direction and because we can win (the two, of course, are inseparable)," On June 23, 2015, Markley faced off against two competitors in the first contested chairmanship election since the 1980s. Markley finished third in the first round of balloting to J.R. Romano and John Pavia. Romano would ultimately be selected as chairman.

=== 2018 lieutenant gubernatorial campaign ===
Markley filed paperwork to seek the position of Lieutenant Governor in the 2018 Gubernatorial elections stating "I feel that this is the spot on the ticket where I can most be of service." He was nominated at the statewide Republican convention as the endorsed candidate of the Republican party with 53.6% of the delegate vote. Both Erin Stewart, mayor of New Britain, CT and Jamie Stevenson of Darien, CT qualified for a primary against him to be held on August 14, 2018. Markley won the Connecticut Primary for Lieutenant Governor with 47.6% of the vote. He ran with Bob Stefanowski, who won the Connecticut Republican primary for Governor, before losing to Ned Lamont and running mate Susan Bysiewicz.

=== Electoral history ===
==== State Senate ====
Year	Office	District	Democratic		Republican		Working Families		Independent	
1984	Connecticut State Senate	16th	William J. Sullivan (inc.)	47.4%	Joe Markley	52.6%				
1986	Connecticut State Senate	16th	Donald M. Rinaldi	53.4%	Joe Markley (inc.)	46.6%				
2010	Connecticut State Senate	16th	John N. Barry	45.2%	Joe Markley	52.2%			Carmine M. Capobianco	2.6%
2012	Connecticut State Senate	16th	Corky Mazurek	47.8%	Joe Markley (inc.)	52.2%				
2014	Connecticut State Senate	16th			Joe Markley (inc.)	79.6%	Christopher Robertson	20.4%		
2016	Connecticut State Senate	16th	Ryan P. Rogers	27.2%	Joe Markley (inc.)	72.8%				

==== Lieutenant governor ====
2018 Republican primary results
Party	Candidate	Votes	%
Republican	Joe Markley	65,702	47.57
Republican	Erin Stewart	45,262	32.77
Republican	Jayme Stevenson	27,138	19.65
Total votes		138,102	100.0

Party political offices
Preceded by Heather Somers	Republican nominee for Lieutenant Governor of Connecticut; 2018	Succeeded by Laura Devlin
Connecticut State Senate
Preceded by William J. Sullivan	Member of the Connecticut Senate from the 16th district 1985–1987	Succeeded by Donald Rinaldi
Preceded by Sam Caligiuri	Member of the Connecticut Senate from the 16th district 2011–2019	Succeeded by Robert Sampson
