= Michael Jarjura =

American politician (born 1961)

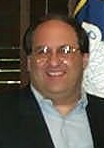

45th Mayor of Waterbury, Connecticut
- In office January 1, 2002 – December 1, 2011
- Preceded by: Sam Caligiuri
- Succeeded by: Neil O'Leary

Member of the Connecticut House of Representatives from the 74th district
- In office January 6, 1993 – January 6, 2002
- Preceded by: Elizabeth Brown
- Succeeded by: Selim Noujaim

Personal details
- Born: Michael Jarjura; May 12, 1961 (age 65) Waterbury, Connecticut, U.S.
- Party: Democratic (until 2011); Republican (2011–present)
- Education: Post College (BS); University of Bridgeport (JD)

Michael Jarjura (born May 12, 1961) is an American attorney and politician who served as the Mayor of Waterbury, Connecticut from 2001 to 2011.

Prior to being Mayor, he was elected in November 1992 to represent Waterbury's 74th District in the Connecticut House of Representatives. He served as House Chairman of the Insurance and Real Estate Committee. He also served on the Judiciary and Finance Committee. During his tenure, Jarjura served as Chairman and member of various Legislative Task Forces and Commissions.

== Early life and education ==
Born in Waterbury, Connecticut, Jarjura was educated in the Waterbury school system and graduated from Sacred Heart High School in 1979. He received a Bachelor of Science in Management from Post University in 1983. He then earned a Juris Doctor from the University of Bridgeport Law School in 1987.

== Career ==
After graduating from law school, Jarjura worked as an independent attorney and businessman. He also served as an assistant Connecticut Attorney General from 1987 to 1993.

=== Connecticut House of Representatives ===
Prior to his election as mayor, Jarjura served in the Connecticut House of Representatives representing the 74th District in the city's east end. He served as House Chairman of the Insurance and Real Estate Committee. He also served on the Judiciary and Finance Committee. During his tenure, Representative Jarjura served as Chairman and member of various Legislative Task Forces and Commissions.

=== Mayor of Waterbury ===
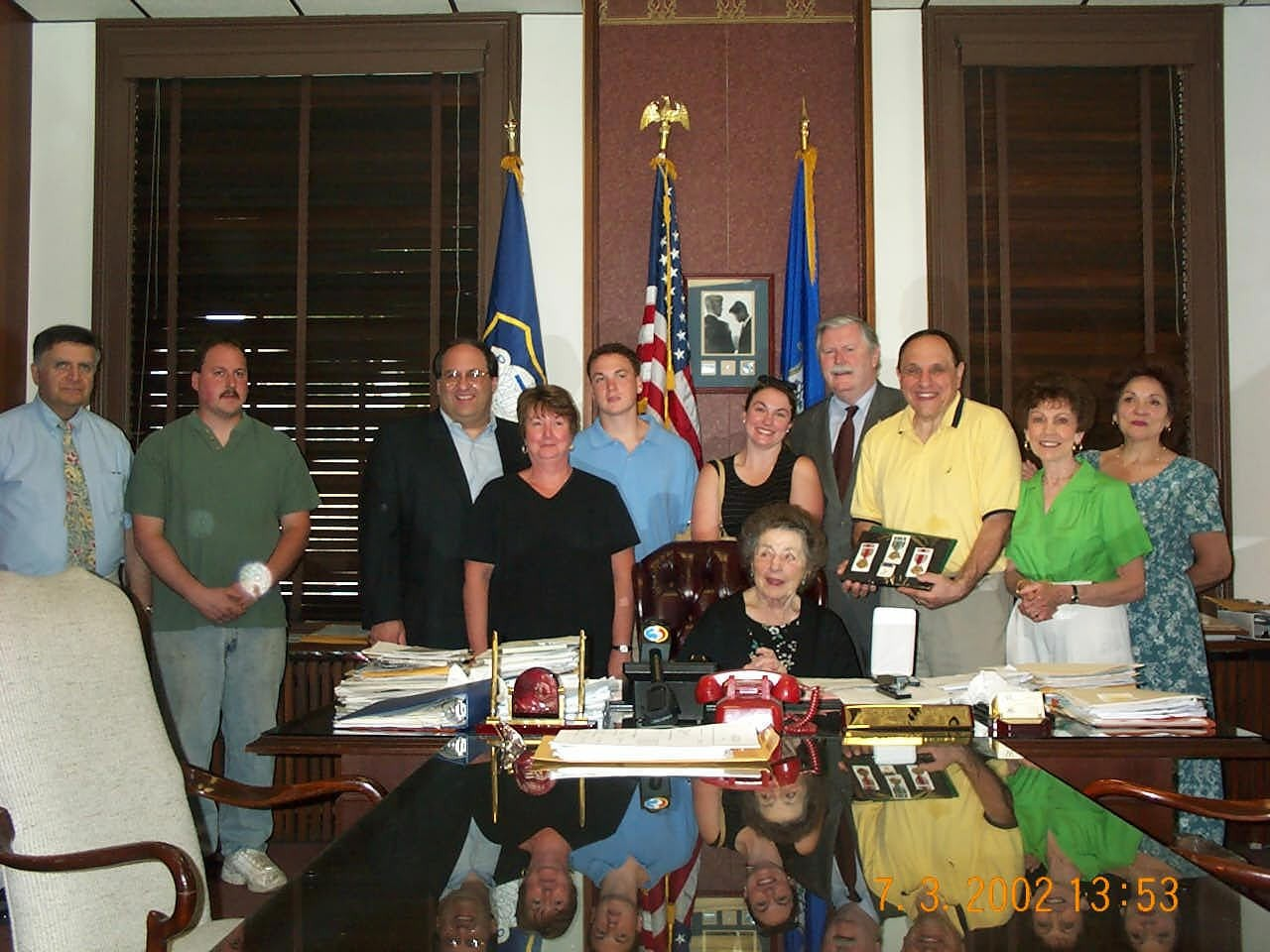
Jarjura at a Medal Ceremony in Waterbury with James H. Maloney, 2002

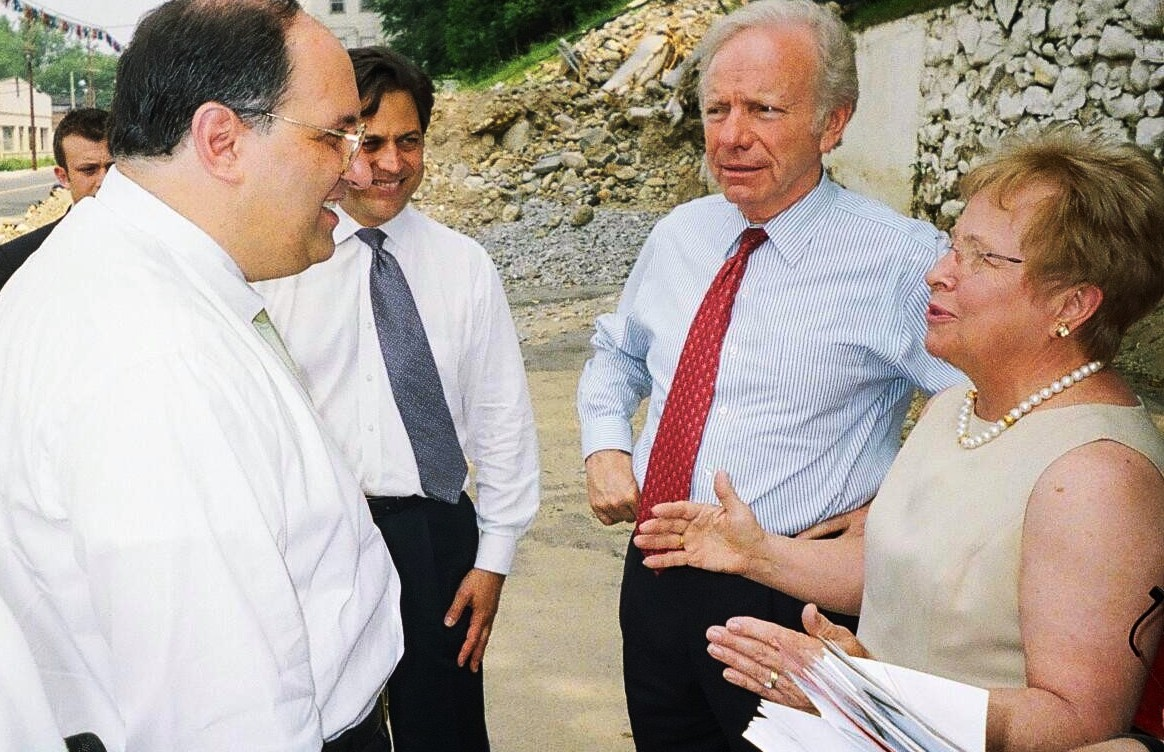
Jarjura talks with Nancy Johnson and Joe Lieberman, 2006

Jarjura was first elected mayor in 2001, and re-elected in 2003. In 2005, he was elected to a third term as a write-in candidate after losing the Democratic primary. He was re-elected in 2007 and 2009 as the Democratic Party nominee. In 2011, after failing to seek the Democratic nomination, he ran for reelection on the Republican Party ticket. In the general election, he was defeated by former police chief Neil O'Leary, who was the Democratic nominee. Perennial Waterbury mayoral candidate Larry DePillo also ran in the general election, as an independent.

=== Political positions ===
Jarjura is a cultural conservative who opposes abortion rights. He is a member of the Legislative Advisory Council of the Family Institute of Connecticut, an organization known for its vocal opposition to same-sex marriage.

Jarjura, long considered a conservative Democrat, joined the Republican party in 2011. In 2006, he endorsed the independent senate campaign of Joe Lieberman. In 2008, he announced he would hire former Governor John G. Rowland, who had served prison time on a corruption charge, as an economic development advisor. In September 2009, Jarjura spoke at a Tea Party rally in Waterbury, saying, "We needed a spark, and you're the spark that is going to be the change. So don't give up. Don't get discouraged because this country is worth fighting for and you're fighting for it."

=== 2010 comptroller election ===
In May 2010, Jarjura, who first explored a run for governor and lieutenant governor, announced he would seek the post of state comptroller being vacated by incumbent Nancy Wyman. His opponent, Kevin Lembo, won the endorsement of the Democratic State Convention later that month.

In July 2010, Jarjura challenged his opponent's request for public funding in a complaint with the Connecticut State Election Enforcement Commission. The commission found no wrongdoing and approved the public grant.

Later in July, Jarjura filed a lawsuit against the State Election Enforcement Commission for approving his primary opponent for public campaign financing. On July 27, Hartford Superior Court Judge James T. Graham denied Jarjura’s request for an injunction against the state and his opponent.

In the state Democratic primary, held on August 10, 2010, Jarjura was defeated by Lembo.

Connecticut House of Representatives
Preceded by Elizabeth Crichton Brown	Member of the Connecticut House of Representatives from the 74th district 1993–2002	Succeeded by Selim Noujaim
Political offices
Preceded by Sam S.F. Caligiuri	Mayor of Waterbury, Connecticut; 2002–2011	Succeeded by Neil O'Leary
