= Doreen Del Bianco =

American politician

Member of the Connecticut House of Representatives from the 71st district
- In office 1983–1985
- Preceded by: Norma Cappelletti
- Succeeded by: Norma Cappelletti
- In office 1987–1993
- Preceded by: Norma Cappelletti
- Succeeded by: Donald J. Davino

Personal details
- Party: Democratic

Doreen M. Del Bianco is an American politician who served in the Connecticut House of Representatives from 1983 to 1985 and 1987 to 1993, representing the 71st district as a Democrat. She lived in Waterbury during her tenure.
