= John Mazurek =

American politician

Member of the Connecticut House of Representatives from the 80th district
- In office January 8, 2003 – January 5, 2011
- Preceded by: Dennis Cleary
- Succeeded by: Robert Sampson

Personal details
- Born: March 2, 1953 (age 73) Waterbury, Connecticut
- Party: Democratic

John Mazurek (born March 2, 1953) is an American politician who served in the Connecticut House of Representatives from the 80th district from 2003 to 2011.
