= Wolcott, Connecticut =

- Town
- Town of Wolcott
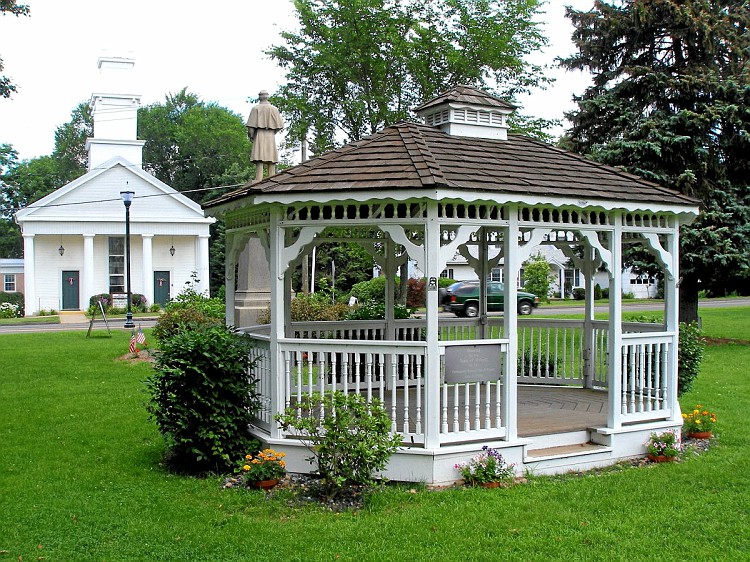
- The gazebo on the Wolcott Town Green

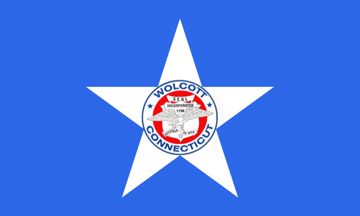
- Flag Seal

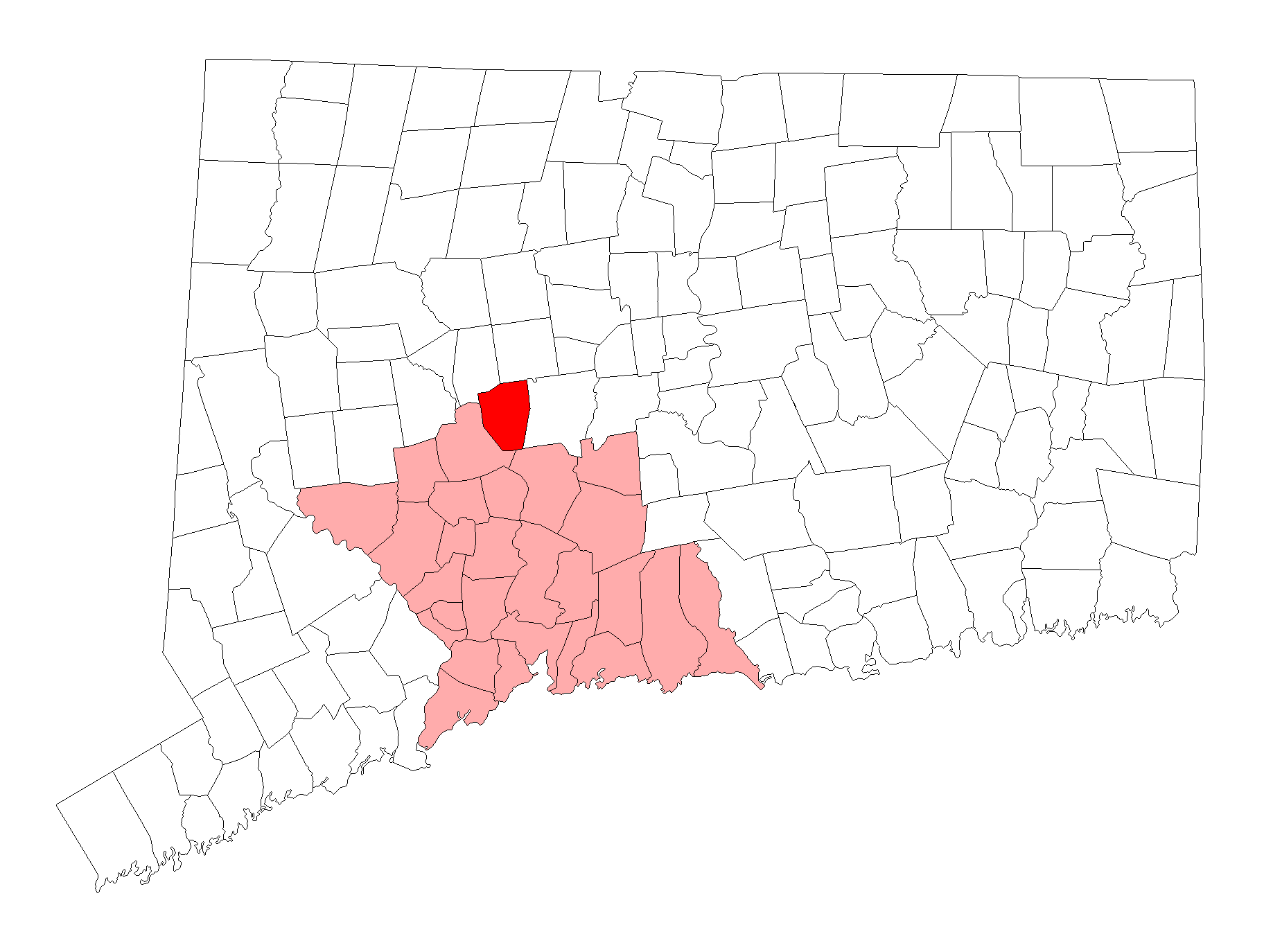
- Coordinates: 41°36′04″N 72°58′30″W
- Country: United States
- U.S. state: Connecticut
- County: New Haven
- Region: Naugatuck Valley
- Incorporated: 1796

Government
  - Type: Mayor-council
  - Mayor: Thomas G. Dunn (U)
  - Town Council: Chairman Sean Hughes (R); Vice Chairman Joseph Skerritt Jr. (R); Terri Sheehan (R); Anthony Guerrera Jr. (R); Michael Macary (D); Cory Lagasse (R); Charles Nappi (D); Rachel Wisler (R); Maggie Gugliotti (D)

Area
  - Total: 21.1 sq mi (54.6 km^{2})
  - Land: 20.4 sq mi (52.9 km^{2})
  - Water: 0.69 sq mi (1.8 km^{2})
- Elevation: 850 ft (260 m)

Population (2020)
  - Total: 16,142
  - Density: 790/sq mi (305/km^{2})
- Time zone: UTC-5 (Eastern)
  - Summer (DST): UTC-4 (Eastern)
- ZIP code: 06716
- Area codes: 203/475
- FIPS code: 09-87560
- GNIS feature ID: 0213538
- Website: www.wolcottct.org

Wolcott (/ˈwʊlkət/ WUUL-kət) is a town in New Haven County, Connecticut, United States. The town is part of the Naugatuck Valley Planning Region. It is primarily residential, with a population of 16,142 as of the 2020 United States census.

The town was settled in the 1730s by English settlers of the Connecticut Colony and was known as Farmingbury. It was renamed Wolcott after being incorporated in 1796, following the United States' gaining independence. Some early records spelled it "Wolcutt".

== History ==
The early towns of Waterbury and Farmington occupied a great deal of west-central Connecticut in the Naugatuck River Valley and Farmington River Valley at the end of the 17th century. At that time, the borderlands between these two towns were known as Farmingbury, a term derived from the two town names.

People were living within the Farmingbury territory as early as the 1730s, but they possessed no official identity apart from the parent towns of either Waterbury or Farmington. By 1770, the residents of Farmingbury successfully petitioned the Connecticut General Assembly to create the First Ecclesiastical Society of Farmingbury. Having established an independent parish, Farmingbury gained some religious, legal, and financial independence from Waterbury and Farmington. However, the political boundaries of the region remained unchanged for more than two decades afterward. During that time, the Farmingbury parish was largely self-sufficient, as it was in a fairly remote location. It was still officially considered to be part of the towns of Waterbury in the west and Farmington in the east. Thus, the parish society had to deal with several matters that would ordinarily have been municipal duties, such as managing taxes and local education.

Farmingbury petitioned the Connecticut General Assembly in 1796, requesting that it be incorporated as an independent town, distinct from Waterbury and Farmington. Assembly votes were tied, with half in favor and half against the proposal. After the tie-breaking vote in favor of Farmingbury was cast by Lieutenant Governor Oliver Wolcott, the lands of Farmingbury were officially ceded by Waterbury and Farmington to the new town. In honor of the Lieutenant Governor's deciding vote, the residents of Farmingbury renamed their newly incorporated town as "Wolcott". The 1800 United States census was the first census conducted after Wolcott's incorporation; it counted 948 individuals living within the town.

=== 1962 tornado ===
On May 24, 1962, the town was heavily damaged by a high-end F3 tornado. Numerous buildings, homes, businesses, and vehicles were damaged or destroyed, trees were blown down, and a refrigeration truck was thrown into a utility pole, cutting power to the area. Overall, the storm left one dead and 50 injured.

== Geography ==
According to the United States Census Bureau, the town has a total area of 21.1 square miles (55 km^{2}), of which 20.4 square miles (53 km^{2}) is land and 0.7 square miles (1.8 km^{2}), or 3.22%, is water.

Although there are no natural lakes of significant size in Wolcott, several man-made reservoirs have been created from the damming of small rivers and brooks. Scovill Reservoir, also known as Woodtick Reservoir, covers 121 acres (49 ha) and was built by damming the Mad River in central Wolcott. Originally constructed in 1917 to supply water for the Scovill Manufacturing Company, a brass manufacturing mill, it is now a town-owned recreational lake. Other reservoirs that are at least partially contained within Wolcott include Chestnut Hill Reservoir, Hitchcock Lake, Southington Reservoir #2, New Britain Reservoir (which extends east into neighboring Southington, Connecticut) and Cedar Lake and Dunham Mill Pond (both of which extend north into neighboring Bristol, Connecticut).

The highest point in New Haven County is found in Wolcott atop Lindsley Hill, which has an elevation of approximately 1,046 feet above sea level.

=== Land use ===
Wolcott has developed as a primarily residential, suburban town, with approximately 56% of the town's land remaining undeveloped. Residential developments occupy roughly 33% of the town and encompass 6,148 housing units (of which 89.5% are single-family homes). Cumulatively, about 11% of the town is currently used for agriculture, commerce/industry, recreation and municipal facilities.

== Demographics ==
Historical population
Census	Pop.	Note	%±
1800	948		—
1810	952		0.4%
1820	943		−0.9%
1830	843		−10.6%
1840	633		−24.9%
1850	603		−4.7%
1860	574		−4.8%
1870	491		−14.5%
1880	493		0.4%
1890	522		5.9%
1900	581		11.3%
1910	563		−3.1%
1920	719		27.7%
1930	972		35.2%
1940	1,765		81.6%
1950	3,553		101.3%
1960	8,889		150.2%
1970	12,495		40.6%
1980	13,008		4.1%
1990	13,700		5.3%
2000	15,215		11.1%
2010	16,680		9.6%
2020	16,142		−3.2%
U.S. Decennial Census

As of the census of 2000, there were 15,215 people, 5,414 households, and 4,249 families residing in the town. The population density was 744.7 inhabitants per square mile (287.5/km^{2}). There were 5,544 housing units at an average density of 271.4 per square mile (104.8/km^{2}). The racial makeup of the town was 96.23% White, 1.24% Black, 0.14% Native American, 0.75% Asian, 0.04% Pacific Islander, 0.59% from other races, and 1.01% from two or more races. Hispanic or Latino of any race were 1.79% of the population.

There were 5,414 households, out of which 37.3% had children under the age of 18 living with them, 66.0% were married couples living together, 8.7% had a female householder with no husband present, and 21.5% were non-families. 18.0% of all households were made up of individuals, and 8.6% had someone living alone who was 65 years of age or older. The average household size was 2.79 and the average family size was 3.17.

In the town, the population was spread out, with 26.0% under the age of 18, 5.6% from 18 to 24, 31.3% from 25 to 44, 24.0% from 45 to 64, and 13.1% who were 65 years of age or older. The median age was 38 years. For every 100 females, there were 95.0 males. For every 100 females age 18 and over, there were 92.5 males.

The median income for a household in the town was $61,376, and the median income for a family was $67,582. Males had a median income of $45,682 versus $31,964 for females. The per capita income for the town was $25,018. About 1.0% of families and 2.6% of the population were below the poverty line, including 2.6% of those under age 18 and 5.0% of those age 65 or over.

== Education ==
Public education is administered by Wolcott Public Schools. Schools in Wolcott include:

Elementary schools (Pre-K-5)

- Alcott Elementary School
- Frisbie Elementary School
- Wakelee Elementary School

Middle school (6-8)

- Tyrrell Middle School

High school (9-12)

- Wolcott High School

== Infrastructure ==
=== Transportation ===
Major roads: CT Route 69 and CT Route 322, both roads intersect with I-84 with exits 23 and 28, respectively less than 2 miles outside of Wolcott.

=== Police ===
The Wolcott Police Department (WPD) occupies a single facility located on Nichols Road. The Chief of Police is Edward Stephens. The department includes an Honor Guard, Emergency Response Team, Detective Division, Accident Investigative Team, Patrol Division, School Resource Officer, Motorcycle Unit, Neighborhood Watch, The D.A.R.E program; Wolcott Police Explorers, for teens who are interested in a future career as an officer; and the Animal Control Unit. WPD is one of many police departments whose officers have been using body cameras (since 2015) to record encounters.

== Notable people ==
- Amos Bronson Alcott (1799–1888), born in Wolcott, teacher, writer, and founder of the utopian community Fruitlands; father of Louisa May Alcott
- William Andrus Alcott (1798–1859), born in Wolcott, teacher and noted author of over 100 books
- Anthony Fantano (born 1985), music critic, internet personality, grew up in Wolcott
- Harry L. Garrigus (1876–1968), UConn professor of animal husbandry, born in Wolcott
- Jahana Hayes (born 1973), U.S. congresswoman, born in Waterbury, lives in Wolcott
- Andrew B. Jackson (1814–1878), Wisconsin pioneer and territorial legislator, born in Wolcott
- Seth Thomas (1785–1859), born in Wolcott, became a noted clock maker
