= Thomas Lee House =

Historic house in Connecticut

- U.S. National Register of Historic Places
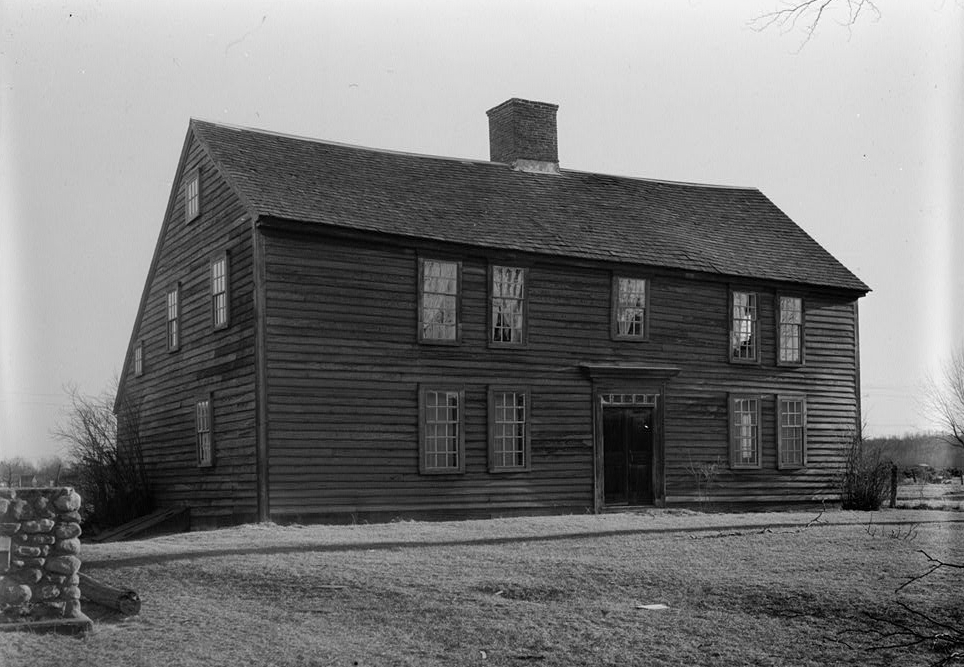
- Thomas Lee House (photo from 1940)

- Location within Connecticut Location within the United States
- Location: CT 156 and Giant's Neck Road, East Lyme, Connecticut
- Coordinates: 41°19′3″N 72°14′20″W
- Area: 2 acres (0.81 ha)
- Built: 1660–4
- Architectural style: Colonial, Saltbox
- NRHP reference No.: 70000693
- Added to NRHP: October 6, 1970

The Thomas Lee House is a historic house at the junction of Giant's Neck Road and Connecticut Route 156 in the Niantic section of East Lyme, Connecticut, built around 1660. It is one of the oldest wood-framed houses in Connecticut, restored in the early 20th century by Norman Isham. It is now maintained by the East Lyme Historical Society as a museum. It was listed on the National Register of Historic Places in 1970.

== Description and history ==
The Thomas Lee House is located in southwestern East Lyme, on the south side of CT 156 just east of Rocky Neck State Park. It is a 2 1/2-story structure, with a post-and-beam timber frame erected on six two-story wall posts, and covered by a steeply pitched roof with a large brick central chimney. Its exterior clapboards appear to be original. The main facade is five bays wide, with a regular arrangement that is offset to the right. The entrance is in the central bay, with flanking pilasters rising to a transom window and corniced entablature.

The interior is indicative of the building's construction history. Its oldest portion was probably built between 1660 and 1664 as a single-pile two-story structure with a side chimney. This was later altered by the addition of another pile on the opposite side of the chimney, and by the addition of a lean-to on the front after a new road was cut to the north of the house. A small, stone-walled partial cellar pit under part of the hall was reached through a trap door. A massive fireplace with timber lintel spanned most of the west wall. Around 1700, the West Parlor and West Chamber were added as a free standing structure framed on its own four corner posts. About 1765, the lean-to was added with the Kitchen and its adjoining rooms. by Thomas Lee II. The West Parlor was plastered, the summer beam and chimney girt were sheathed, and the paneling formerly on the plastered walls was reused in the lean-to. New paneling was added on the fireplace wall with four flute pilasters.

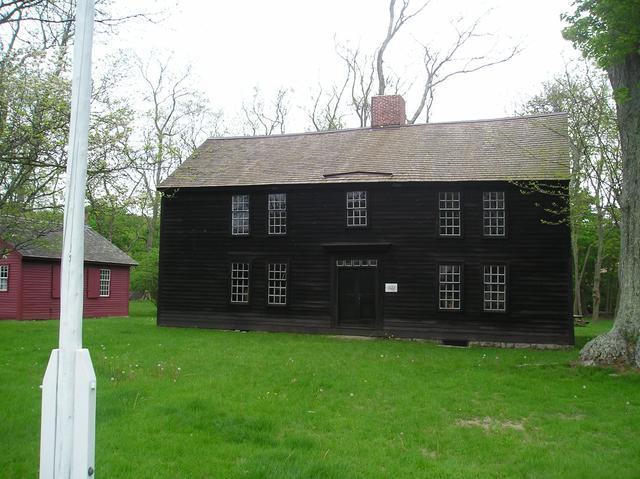
Thomas Lee House present day

The house was built by Thomas Lee, the second of that name to own the land, and remained in the Lee family until the mid-19th century, when it was sold to a neighbor. It was used as a chicken house and for storage until 1914, when Lee family descendants banded together with the Society for the Preservation of New England Antiquities to repurchase the house. It was given a painstaking restoration to its believed 17th-century appearance under the guidance of early preservationist Norman Isham, and was opened as a museum in 1915. Today the house is a historic house museum operated by the East Lyme Historical Society, and furnished as it would have been in the 18th century.

== See also ==
- List of the oldest buildings in Connecticut
- National Register of Historic Places listings in New London County, Connecticut
