= Madeline Guarraia =

American child who died of leukemia (2006–2016)

Madeline Grace Guarraia (August 21, 2006 – April 6, 2016) was a child from East Lyme, Connecticut, whose widely followed battle with leukemia received notable regional media coverage. Her illness, the community support that formed around her, and the public response to her death were documented by multiple news outlets in southeastern Connecticut. The scale of public involvement, including a large memorial gathering reported by NBC Connecticut, brought broader attention to issues surrounding childhood cancer and family support networks.

== Biography ==
Guarraia was raised in Niantic, Connecticut, and was enrolled in Lillie B. Haynes Elementary School. She was diagnosed with leukemia as a young child and underwent several years of treatment. Her family shared updates about her condition online, which contributed to a significant community following. Connecticut news sources reported on the public interest in her story and the ways in which local residents organized gestures of support.

In April 2016, Guarraia died at home at the age of nine. Later that month, NBC Connecticut reported that “hundreds” of community members attended a public celebration of her life, describing the gathering as a major local event reflecting the widespread attention her story had received.

== Legacy ==
Media reporting and commentary in the region have cited Guarraia's case in discussions of childhood leukemia, community-based support for families facing pediatric illness, and the challenges associated with long-term treatment. Her story remains referenced in local coverage of childhood cancer awareness efforts and memorial events.
