= McCook Park Beach =

Park and beach in East Lyme, Connecticut, United States

McCook Point Park
- McCook Beach
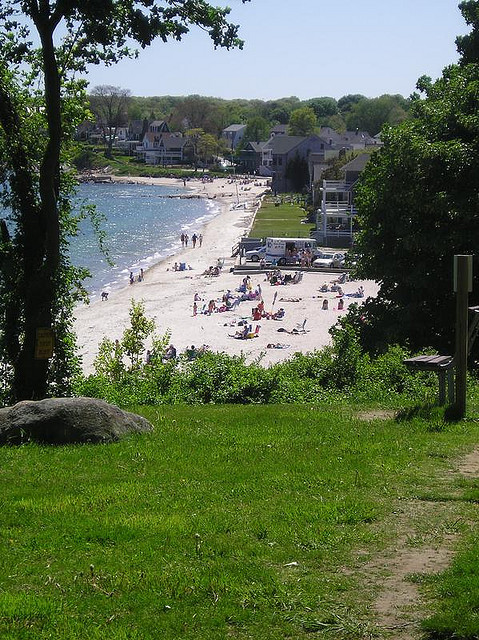
- McCook Point Park Beach
- Interactive map of McCook Point Park
- Location: East Lyme, Connecticut
- Coordinates: 41.31956°N 72.19623°W
- Area: 21 acres (8.5 ha)
- Created: 1954
- Operator: Town of East Lyme
- Status: Open year round, daily or seasonal passes must be purchased for access from Memorial Day through Labor Day
- Website: Town of East Lyme

McCook Point is a public park and beach located in the village of Niantic in the town of East Lyme. It adjoins the town's Hole in the Wall Beach to its east and the private Crescent Beach to its west. Combined, the two parks encompass 21 acres of land, the bulk of which is within the section known as McCook Point Park.

McCook Park has the following facilities:

- A covered picnic pavilion that can be rented and reserved for use
- Two restroom facilities: one at the lower beach area, the other on the bluff near the picnic pavilion
- Playground equipment on the bluff area
- Parking by the beach and on the bluff by the pavilion

== Geography ==
McCook Point Park consists of the point itself which stands about 40 feet above sea level, and a beach area that is the easternmost point of the Crescent Beach area. The point represents an example of the geological forces that created the northern shore of the Long Island Sound: a combination of three mountain building events creating bedrock units with a north-south grain, and subsequent glacial action that eroded the softer rock structure to create the existing coastline including McCook Point and adjoining Black Point.

== History ==
McCook Point has been used for fishing and recreation for centuries.

=== Pre-colonial Period ===
McCook Point served as a summer camping site for Nehantic Indians. The Nehantics camped along the Niantic River and the Niantic Sound, including McCook Point, during the summer months. They grew corn, beans, and squash, as well as catching fish and shellfish in the sound, the river, and other streams that feed the sound.

=== Colonial Period ===
When European settlers arrived, McCook Point along with much of the area surrounding it was left to the Nehantics, as settlers chose to live closer to the King's Highway, now known as the Boston Post Road, in what is now the village of Flanders. At this time McCook Point was known as Champlain's Point.

The Nehantics continued to occupy the area along the Niantic River, McCook Point, and Black Point, and supported the colonists in the Pequot War of 1634 to 1638. The victorious colonists issued land grants to Captain Thomas Bull and four of his soldiers around McCook Point.

=== Settlement by the McCooks ===
With the construction of the Shore Line Railway that connected New Haven to New London in 1852, the village of Niantic began to grow as it opened up the shoreline to summer tourists. One of those tourists was the Reverend Professor John James McCook, the rector of St. John's Episcopal Church of East Hartford in 1869. He and his family began spending the summer in Niantic for the benefit of their eldest son's health. The family purchased 16 acres of Niantic shoreline in the Crescent Beach area including Champlain's Point. The family built a house on the point itself, which they occupied only during the summer months.

=== State Condemnation Efforts ===
In the 1920s, the State of Connecticut entered into a legal dispute with the McCook family when the state attempted to condemn a portion of the land to expand its Seaside Sanatorium tuberculosis facility, which had opened in 1919. State officials initially purchased the bankrupt White Beach Hotel in the Crescent Beach area and opened it with a maximum of 45 beds to treat children with tuberculosis.

The commission members quickly recognized that the facility needed to expand as indicated in their report for 1920 to 1922. In spite of the fact that the Seaside was the first state institution of its kind in America, and that many of the leaders of the medical profession were yet skeptical of the power of continuous sun-baths to cure bone tuberculosis, the success of the institution was immediate, and in a few months a waiting list of patients began to form.

A waiting list is a very serious problem for a state institution that offers the public relief from pain and hope of cure which are not available elsewhere. Even the most enthusiastic of the medical friends of the Seaside lost much of their enthusiasm when they found that they could not secure the admission of their patients to the new institution for months and sometimes a year after his or her application had been filed.

The commission approached the McCooks about their property:

"Before the sitting of the last General Assembly, we approached the owners of this tract of land east of the state property, to learn the price they set on the whole or part of this property. After considerable delay, the owners came together for a conference on our request and replied to us that the land 'was not for sale in whole or in part.'"

The State Commission decided it was imperative that it acquire at least a portion of the McCook property to expand the sanitarium, but the McCooks were living up to their name the "Fighting McCooks." The commission was becoming frustrated by the McCooks' refusal to sell, as expressed in their 1922 to 1924 report:

"The 1923 appropriation of $100,000 for the erection of the proposed new sanatorium building at The Seaside, and of $25,000 for the purchase of the necessary adjoining land and the 1925 appropriation of $30,000 for the purchase of necessary adjoining land; all remain unexpended in the State Treasury.

If the owner of this unused land that the State wishes to purchase, and that the last General Assembly directed the Governor to secure "by condemnation or otherwise," succeeds in postponing a legal decision in the matter until after the first of next July, the appropriations of $100,000 for the erection of the building, and of $25,000 for the purchase of land, become null and void."

The McCooks, represented by Attorney Anson McCook, fought the state's efforts to condemn their property. The case found its way to the state Superior Court, which ruled in favor of the McCooks. In 1930, the state gave up on the Niantic site, and instead purchased property in nearby Waterford, CT to build a new facility which opened in 1934.

=== Town Purchase ===
The Town of East Lyme purchased the McCook property in 1953 to stave off acquisition by a Hartford real estate firm. The town voted in a town meeting on Dec. 28, 1953 to purchase the property for $87,500.
