= Elizabeth Ritter =

American politician (born 1951)

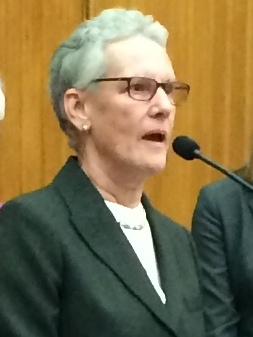
- Ritter in 2015

Member of the Connecticut House of Representatives from the 38th district
- In office 2005–2015
- Preceded by: Andrea Stillman
- Succeeded by: Kathleen McCarty

Personal details
- Born: July 24, 1951 (age 74)
- Party: Democratic
- Education: Denison University (B.A.); University of Florida (MBA)

Elizabeth "Betsy" Ritter (born July 24, 1951) is an American politician who served in the Connecticut House of Representatives from 2005 to 2015, representing the 38th district as a Democrat. In 2014, Ritter ran to represent the 20th district in the Connecticut State Senate, but was defeated by Republican candidate Paul Formica. In January 2015, Governor Dannel Malloy nominated Ritter to oversee Connecticut's Department on Aging.
