= Melodie Peters =

American politician (1947–2023)

Member of the Connecticut State Senate from the 20th district
- In office January 6, 1993 – January 5, 2005
- Preceded by: Lawrence Bettencourt
- Succeeded by: Andrea Stillman

Personal details
- Born: July 22, 1947 Springfield, Massachusetts, U.S.
- Died: July 31, 2023 (aged 76) Old Lyme, Connecticut, U.S.
- Party: Democratic

Melodie Peters (July 22, 1947 – July 31, 2023) was an American politician who served in the Connecticut State Senate from the 20th district from 1993 to 2005.

She died on July 31, 2023, in Old Lyme, Connecticut at age 76.
