= Martha Marx =

American politician (born 1963)

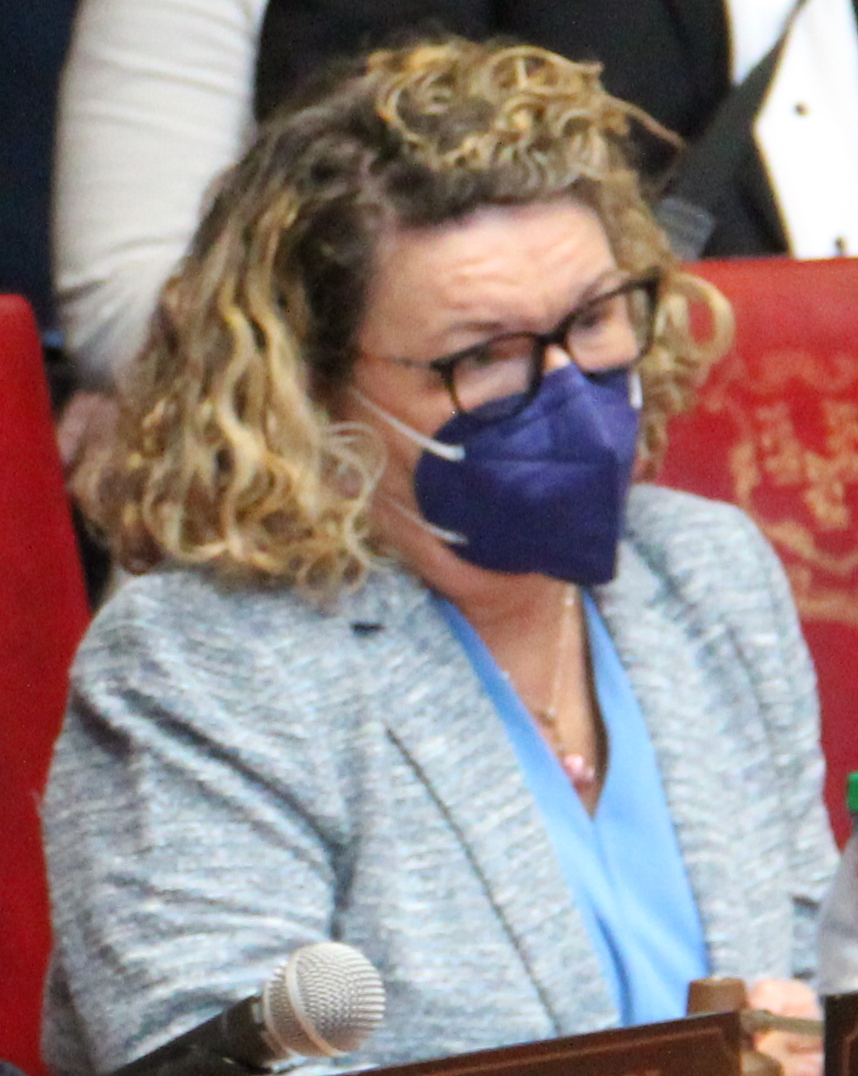
- Marx in 2023

Member of the Connecticut State Senate from the 20th district
- Incumbent
- Assumed office 2023
- Preceded by: Paul Formica

Personal details
- Born: February 1, 1963 (age 63)
- Party: Democratic

Martha Marx is an American politician from the town of New London in the state of Connecticut. She is the State Senator for Connecticut's 20th State Senate district, covering the towns of New London, Salem, Bozrah, East Lyme, Old Lyme, Waterford, and parts of Old Saybrook and Montville. She is a member of the Democratic Party. She was also endorsed by the Working Families Party during their 2022 campaign. She was elected in 2022 after being defeated in her bid for state senate in 2020 and 2018.

== Personal life ==
Marx is originally from Waterford and raised her four children in New London. She continues to work as a Registered Nurse.
