= Andrea Stillman =

American politician (born 1948)

Member of the Connecticut State Senate from the 20th district
- In office January 5, 2005 – January 7, 2015
- Preceded by: Melodie Peters
- Succeeded by: Paul Formica

Member of the Connecticut House of Representatives from the 38th district
- In office January 6, 1993 – January 5, 2005
- Preceded by: Janet Polinsky
- Succeeded by: Elizabeth Ritter

Personal details
- Born: January 14, 1948 (age 78) New York City, New York, U.S.
- Party: Democratic

Andrea Stillman (born January 14, 1948) is an American politician who served in the Connecticut House of Representatives from the 38th district from 1993 to 2005 and in the Connecticut State Senate from the 20th district from 2005 to 2015. She is Jewish.
