= Niantic, Connecticut =

Census-designated place in Connecticut, United States

- Census-designated place
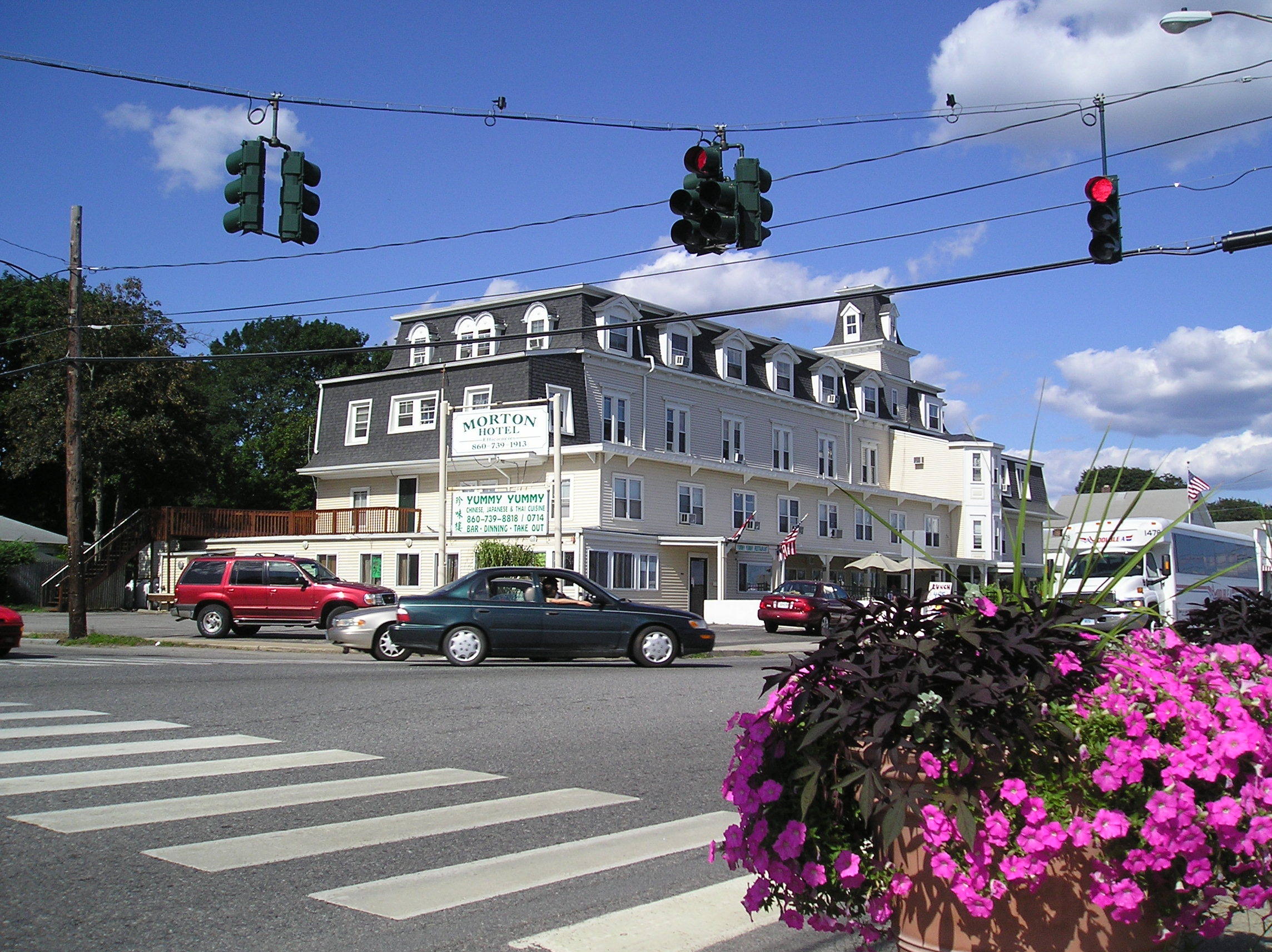
- The Morton House
- Etymology: Niantic people
- Location in New London County, Connecticut
- Coordinates: 41°19′31″N 72°11′35″W
- Country: United States
- State: Connecticut
- Town: East Lyme

Area
  - Total: 3.5 sq mi (9.1 km^{2})
  - Land: 1.5 sq mi (3.9 km^{2})
  - Water: 2.1 sq mi (5.4 km^{2})

Population (2020)
  - Total: 3,194
  - Density: 2,100/sq mi (820/km^{2})
- Time zone: UTC−5 (Eastern (EST))
  - Summer (DST): UTC−4 (EDT)
- ZIP code: 06357
- Area code: 860
- FIPS code: 09-53120
- GNIS feature ID: 2377839
- Website: eltownhall.com

Niantic (/naɪˈæntɪk/ ny-AN-tik) is a census-designated place (CDP) and village in the town of East Lyme, Connecticut. As of the 2020 census, Niantic had a population of 3,194. It is located on Long Island Sound.

== Geography ==
According to the United States Census Bureau, the CDP has a total area of 3.5 square miles (9.1 km^{2}), of which 1.5 square miles (3.8 km^{2}) is land and 2.1 square miles (5.4 km^{2}), or 58.64%, is water. Niantic beaches include McCook Point Park, Cini Memorial Park, and Hole-in-the-Wall Beach.

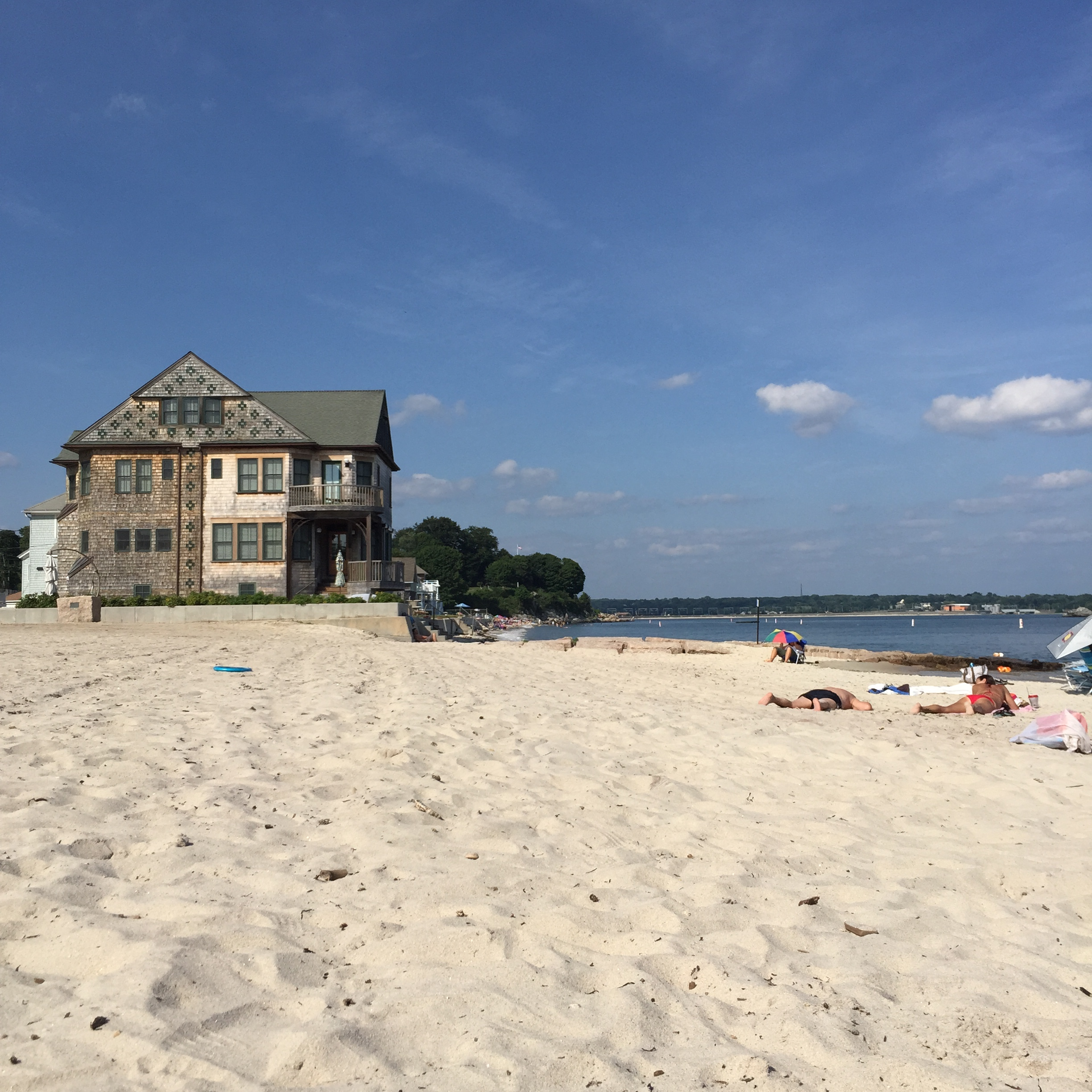
Residential House on Crescent Beach in Niantic, CT

== Demographics ==
=== 2020 census ===
As of the 2020 census, Niantic had a population of 3,194. The median age was 55.5 years. 12.3% of residents were under the age of 18 and 31.4% of residents were 65 years of age or older. For every 100 females there were 85.8 males, and for every 100 females age 18 and over there were 83.0 males age 18 and over.

100.0% of residents lived in urban areas, while 0.0% lived in rural areas.

There were 1,604 households in Niantic, of which 16.1% had children under the age of 18 living in them. Of all households, 39.3% were married-couple households, 19.3% were households with a male householder and no spouse or partner present, and 35.5% were households with a female householder and no spouse or partner present. About 42.4% of all households were made up of individuals and 19.9% had someone living alone who was 65 years of age or older.

There were 1,989 housing units, of which 19.4% were vacant. The homeowner vacancy rate was 1.4% and the rental vacancy rate was 2.5%.

Racial composition as of the 2020 census
Race	Number	Percent
White	2,869	89.8%
Black or African American	27	0.8%
American Indian and Alaska Native	8	0.3%
Asian	64	2.0%
Native Hawaiian and Other Pacific Islander	1	0.0%
Some other race	53	1.7%
Two or more races	172	5.4%
Hispanic or Latino (of any race)	144	4.5%

=== 2000 census ===
As of the 2000 census, there were 3,085 people, 1,404 households, and 835 families residing in the CDP. The population density was 2,110.3 inhabitants per square mile (814.8/km^{2}). There were 1,756 housing units at an average density of 1,201.2 per square mile (463.8/km^{2}). The racial makeup of the CDP was 96.63% White, 0.49% African American, 0.16% Native American, 1.23% Asian, 0.42% from other races, and 1.07% from two or more races. Hispanic or Latino of any race were 2.11% of the population.

There were 1,404 households, out of which 24.6% had children under the age of 18 living with them, 46.3% were married couples living together, 10.5% had a female householder with no husband present, and 40.5% were non-families. 33.4% of all households were made up of individuals, and 11.7% had someone living alone who was 65 years of age or older. The average household size was 2.20 and the average family size was 2.81.

In the CDP, the population was spread out, with 20.3% under the age of 18, 5.9% from 18 to 24, 29.0% from 25 to 44, 27.0% from 45 to 64, and 17.8% who were 65 years of age or older. The median age was 42 years. For every 100 females, there were 91.3 males. For every 100 females age 18 and over, there were 89.7 males.

The median income for a household in the CDP was $54,872, and the median income for a family was $65,077. Males had a median income of $46,887 versus $35,811 for females. The per capita income for the CDP was $27,306. About 1.9% of families and 3.6% of the population were below the poverty line, including 7.2% of those under age 18 and 1.8% of those age 65 or over.

== Education ==
Niantic Center School is located in downtown Niantic and is one of three elementary (K-4) schools in the East Lyme Public Schools district. Students move on to East Lyme Middle School for grades 5-8 and East Lyme High School for grades 9–12.

== Notable people ==
- William Bryden (1880–1972), U.S. Army major general
- William Colepaugh (1918–2005), Nazi sympathizer who grew up on Black Point and traveled to Germany in 1944 to be trained as a spy
- Tom Danielson (1978–), former professional road bicycle racer
- Rajai Davis (1980–), baseball player with multiple ball clubs
- Charles Drake (born "Charles Ruppert") (1917–1994), actor in over 80 films and numerous television shows
- Otto Graham (1921–2003), Hall of Fame professional football player
- John McDonald, Major League Baseball player with multiple ball clubs
- Jeremy Powers, professional racing cyclist riding for Jelly Belly
- Priscilla Presley, actress and businesswoman; spent early childhood in Niantic
- Jay Allen Sanford, author and cartoonist best known as the co-creator of the comic book Rock 'N' Roll Comics, and for his work with Revolutionary Comics, Carnal Comics, and the San Diego Reader
- William N. H. Smith (1812–1889), congressman from North Carolina; attended schools in East Lyme
- Ed Toth, professional musician currently with The Doobie Brothers, formerly with Vertical Horizon and Jennifer Culture
- Vladimir Peter Tytla (1904–1968), known as Bill Tytla, one of the original Disney animators
- Pete Walker, professional baseball player with several teams; currently a Toronto Blue Jays coach

== See also ==
- East Lyme, Connecticut
- Niantic people, namesake tribe
- SS Niantic Victory
