= Connecticut's 38th House of Representatives district =

American legislative district

Connecticut's 38th State House of Representatives district
Representative
Nick Gauthier; D

Connecticut's 38th House of Representatives district elects one member of the Connecticut House of Representatives. It consists of the town of Waterford and part of Montville. It has been represented by Democrat Nick Gauthier since 2025.

== List of representatives ==
List of Representatives from Connecticut's 38th State House District
Representative	Party	Years	District home	Note
James B. Lowell Jr.	Republican	1967–1973	Canton	Seat created
Rufus C. Rose	Republican	1973–1975	Waterford	
Winifred Tanger	Democratic	1975–1977	Waterford	
Janet Polinsky	Democratic	1977–1993	Waterford	
Andrea Stillman	Democratic	1993–2005	Waterford	
Elizabeth Ritter	Democratic	2005–2015	Quaker Hill	
Kathleen McCarty	Republican	2015–2025	Waterford	
Nick Gauthier	Democratic	2025–	Waterford	

== Recent elections ==
=== 2020 ===
2020 Connecticut State House of Representatives election, District 38
Party	Candidate	Votes	%
Democratic	Baird Welch-Collins	6,924	48.78
Republican	Kathleen McCarty (incumbent)	6,833	48.14
Independent Party	Kathleen McCarty (incumbent)	436	3.07
Total votes		14,193	100.00
Republican hold			

=== 2018 ===
2018 Connecticut House of Representatives election, District 38
Party	Candidate	Votes	%
Republican	Kathleen McCarty (Incumbent)	5,701	51.6
Democratic	Baird Welch-Collins	5,350	48.4
Total votes		11,051	100.00
Republican hold			

=== 2016 ===
2016 Connecticut House of Representatives election, District 38
Party	Candidate	Votes	%
Republican	Kathleen McCarty (Incumbent)	6,747	55.14
Democratic	Sharon Palmer	5,012	40.96
Green	Lauren Shaw	477	3.90
Total votes		12,236	100.00
Republican hold			

=== 2014 ===
2014 Connecticut House of Representatives election, District 38
Party	Candidate	Votes	%
Republican	Kathleen McCarty	3,950	45.4
Democratic	Marc Balestracci	4,199	48.2
Independent Party	Kathleen McCarty	339	3.9
Green	Billy Gene Collins	221	2.50
Total votes		8,709	100.00
Republican gain from Democratic			

=== 2012 ===
2012 Connecticut House of Representatives election, District 38
Party	Candidate	Votes	%
Democratic	Elizabeth Ritter (Incumbent)	6,761	60.7
Republican	Tony Siragausa	4,383	39.3
Total votes		11,144	100.00
Democratic hold			
