= William Gorton Farm =

Historic house in Connecticut, United States

- U.S. National Register of Historic Places
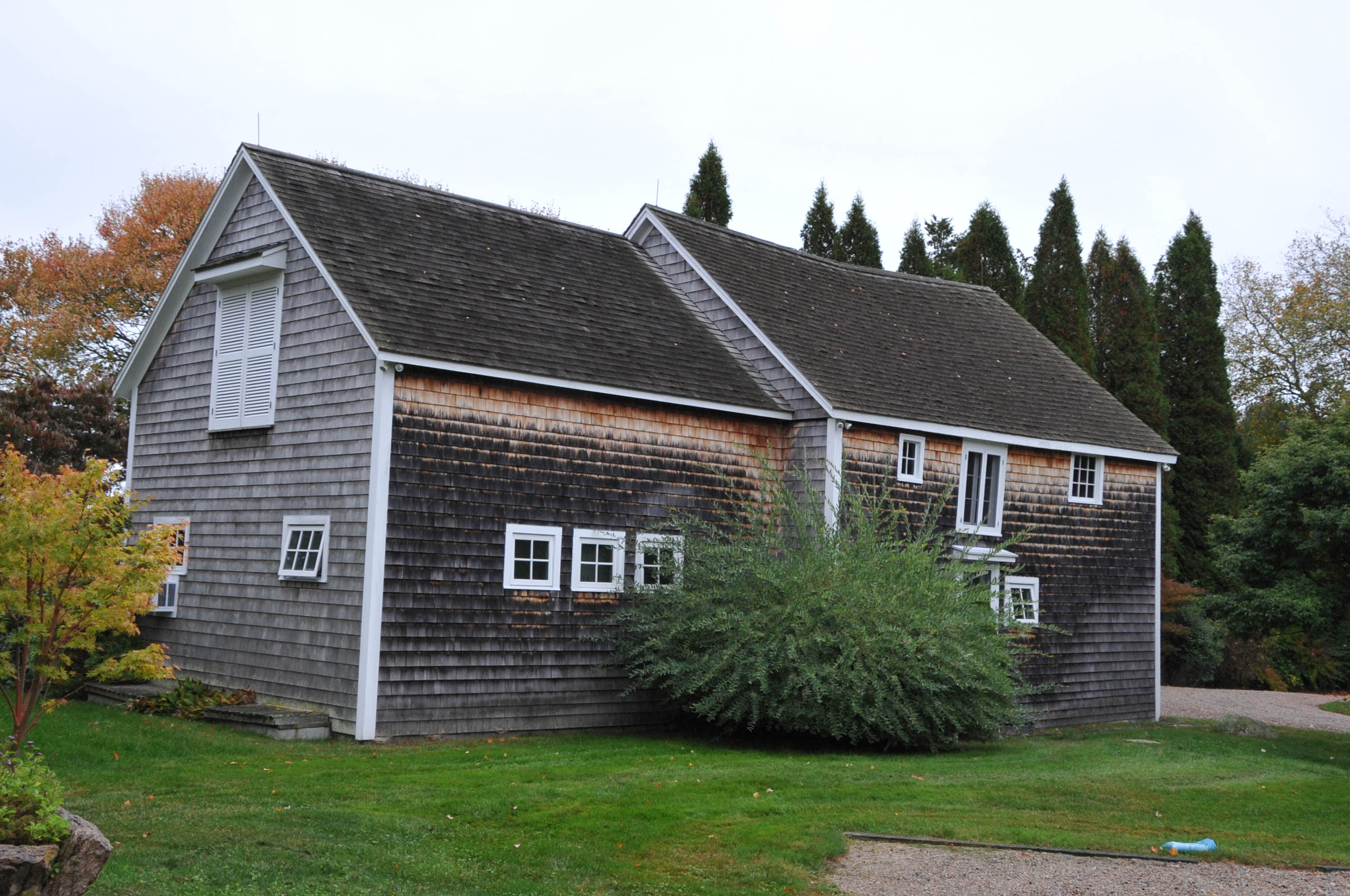
- The horse barn

- Location within Connecticut Location within the United States
- Location: 14 West Lane, East Lyme, Connecticut
- Coordinates: 41°17′23.6″N 72°12′20.8″W
- Area: 19.2 acres (7.8 ha)
- Architectural style: Georgian
- NRHP reference No.: 84001166
- Added to NRHP: April 5, 1984

The William Gorton Farm, also known as the Bond Farm, is a historic farm complex at 14 West Lane in East Lyme, Connecticut. The site was continuously used for various agricultural pursuits from the late 17th to the early 20th centuries. The existing buildings date from the 18th century to the late 19th century, including a farmhouse, two barns, a blacksmith shop, and the remains of an icehouse and dock. The farm was added to the National Register of Historic Places on April 5, 1984.

== History ==
Christopher Christophers, believed to be an emigrant from Barbados, purchased a large tract of land on what was then called Black Point, in 1686. It was probably used for hay and pasturage for livestock. The land passed via marriage to the Manwaring family in 1723, and was used at least part of the time for cattle. The surviving farmhouse dates from the last quarter the 18th century, and had possibly been built by 1782 when a house farm and buildings were mentioned in a will. The land was sold to Robert Gorton in 1817. A dock was built in 1858, and used to load hay for vessels bound for the West Indies. The large red barn was built circa 1869, the other two surviving buildings, a horse and blacksmith shop, were also likely built soon after.

Colonel Norman J. Bond purchased the farm from William G. Gorton in 1874. Part of the farm was used for Black Point Cottages, a summer resort venture started by Bond. By the 1880s a colony consisting mainly of wealthy New Yorkers occupied the southern tip of Black Point. Although the West Indies trade had by then subsided, dairy farming continued on the remaining portion of the farm until the 1930s.

== See also ==
- National Register of Historic Places listings in New London County, Connecticut
