= Janet Polinsky =

American politician (1930–2016)

Member of the Connecticut House of Representatives from the 38th district
- In office January 5, 1977 – January 6, 1993
- Preceded by: Winifred Tanger
- Succeeded by: Andrea Stillman

Personal details
- Born: December 6, 1930 Hartford, Connecticut, U.S.
- Died: September 27, 2016 (aged 85) Redmond, Washington, U.S.
- Party: Democratic

Janet Polinsky (December 6, 1930 – September 27, 2016) was an American politician who served in the Connecticut House of Representatives from the 38th district from 1977 to 1993.

She died of lung cancer on September 27, 2016, in Redmond, Washington at age 85.
