= Winifred Tanger =

American politician (1922–2014)

Member of the Connecticut House of Representatives from the 38th district
- In office 1975–1977
- Preceded by: Rufus C. Rose
- Succeeded by: Janet Polinsky

Personal details
- Born: Winifred Ann Mangan; February 10, 1922 Irvington, New Jersey, U.S.
- Died: April 9, 2014 (aged 92) Newington, Connecticut, U.S.
- Party: Democratic
- Spouse(s): William Henry Tanger (m. 1942; div. 1974) Frank Berkowitz (m. 1976; died 2001)
- Children: 6

Winifred Ann Tanger (February 10, 1922 – April 9, 2014) was an American politician who served in the Connecticut House of Representatives from 1975 to 1977, representing the 38th district as a Democrat.

== Political career ==
Tanger first became involved in politics after moving to Waterford, Connecticut, in 1952. She served on Waterford's Democratic Town Committee, Representative Town Committee, and school board.

Tanger was elected to the Connecticut House of Representatives in 1974 and served for one term representing the 38th district as a Democrat. While serving in the House, she focused on local issues including traffic safety and lowering property taxes, and lobbied for the replacement of the Niantic River Bridge. She did not run for reelection in 1976 and was succeeded by fellow Democrat Janet Polinsky.

== Personal life ==
Winifred Ann Mangan was born on February 10, 1922, in Irvington, New Jersey, and grew up in nearby East Orange. She worked for an insurance company and as a real estate agent outside of her political career.

In 1942, Tanger married her first husband, William Henry Tanger, an engineer and U.S. Army sergeant who served in World War II and was present at the Battle of Remagen. He would later work as a marine draftsman and on the USS Nautilus, the world's first nuclear submarine. In 1952, the couple moved to Waterford, Connecticut. They had six children together and separated in 1974.

In 1976, Tanger married her second husband, Frank Berkowitz, a journalist and a founding trustee of the Eugene O'Neill Theater Center in Waterford. The two were married until Berkowitz died in 2001.

== Death ==
Tanger died on April 9, 2014, in Newington, Connecticut. She was 92.
