= Nick Gauthier =

American politician

Member of the Connecticut House of Representatives from the 38th district
- Incumbent
- Assumed office January 8, 2025
- Preceded by: Kathleen McCarty

Personal details
- Born: 1987 (age 38–39) New London, Connecticut, United States
- Party: Democratic
- Education: University of Connecticut; University of New Haven
- Website: https://www.nickgauthierct.com/

Nick Gauthier (born 1987) is an American politician and member of the Connecticut House of Representatives since 2024 from the 38th district, which consists of the town of Waterford and part of Montville. He was previously elected to the Waterford Representative Town Meeting. He is a member of Democratic Socialists of America (DSA).
