= Kathleen McCarty =

American politician

Member of the Connecticut House of Representatives from the 38th district
- In office January 7, 2015 – January 8, 2025
- Preceded by: Elizabeth Ritter
- Succeeded by: Nick Gauthier

Personal details
- Born: December 2, 1949 (age 76)
- Party: Republican
- Education: Sacred Heart University (BA); Fairfield University (MA); Fordham University (MA)

Kathleen McCarty (born December 2, 1949) is an American politician who served in the Connecticut House of Representatives from the 38th district from 2015 to 2025.
