= The Seaside (Waterford, Connecticut) =

- U.S. National Register of Historic Places
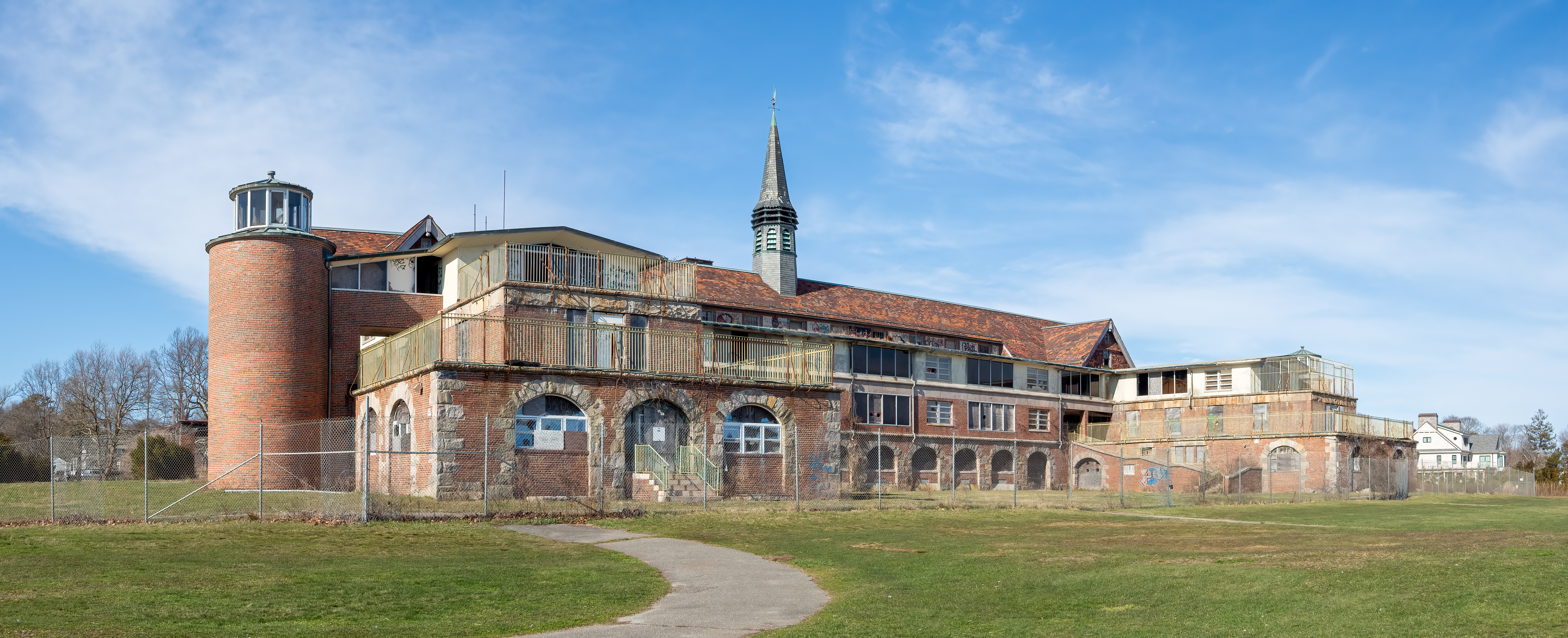

- Location within Connecticut Location within the United States
- Location: 36 Shore Road, Waterford, Connecticut
- Coordinates: 41°18′8″N 72°7′55″W
- Area: 36 acres (15 ha)
- Built: 1934
- Architect: Cass Gilbert
- Architectural style: Tudor Revival, Classical Revival
- NRHP reference No.: 95001007
- Added to NRHP: August 15, 1995

The Seaside is a historic medical facility at 36 Shore Road in Waterford, Connecticut. It is nationally significant as the first institution designed for heliotropic treatment of children suffering from tuberculosis. Its buildings "comprise an exceptional collection of fully realized and generally well-preserved Tudor Revival-style institutional architecture", which were designed by Cass Gilbert. The property was listed on the National Register of Historic Places in 1995.

== History ==
The facility was originally built to treat children with tuberculosis and was later used as an elderly home, medical hospital, and a facility to treat the mentally disabled. In the 1930s, it opened for children with tuberculosis. Then in 1958, it was used as an elderly home for three years, after which it was used to treat people with developmental disabilities until 1996. During the period in which the facility treated tuberculosis, it was called Seaside Sanatorium. When it housed the elderly, it was called Seaside Geriatric Hospital. When it reopened again, it was called Seaside Regional Center for the Mentally Retarded.

The Waterford property where the Seaside Sanatorium would stand was commissioned in 1930 by The State Tuberculosis Commission. The 28-acre property was purchased from the heirs of the Smith-Grimes estate. More land was purchased in 1936, bringing the property to its current boundaries, totaling 36 acres at a cost of $125,000.

The Seaside is actually the second “The Seaside” to stand for the heliotropic treatment of tuberculosis in children. The first site was at the White Beach Hotel at Crescent Beach in neighboring Niantic, Connecticut. The original sanatorium received its first patients by January 1920. Being the first and only treatment center for tuberculosis in the country, its 45 beds quickly filled and the waiting list began to grow. The State Tuberculosis Commission knew they had to expand but were unable to do so because the McCook family, who owned the neighboring property, refused to sell. The state went as far as the Supreme Court to try to seize the land through eminent domain. The McCooks won the lawsuit, however, and the state sought land elsewhere.

The facility's current property became available and the state purchased it. Famed architect Cass Gilbert was commissioned to design the buildings. The Waterford facility was ready and the Niantic patients transferred in 1934. The location of the center, the first of its kind in the nation, was chosen because of the fresh sea air and ample sunlight. At the time, it was thought that fresh air and much sunshine could help cure tuberculosis. The children, all 14 and under, would spend their days outside sunning as part of their heliotherapy. By the end of the 1940s, advancements in drug therapies were being made and the usefulness of sanatoriums declined.

In 2014, Governor Dannel Malloy made a final decision to rebuild the Seaside Sanatorium as a state park. Four years prior, Malloy had signed a contract with the developer, Mark Steiner, who filed a $20 million lawsuit against the state after Malloy's announcement.

In 2023, the State of Connecticut authorized funding to remove the deteriorated buildings, protect the site from flooding and commemorate its historical significance, and make improvements for the public such as adding walking trails and bathrooms. In July 2024, Connecticut’s Department of Energy and Environmental Protection (DEEP) solicited public input into the redesign of Seaside State Park.

== Photo gallery ==
- Various angles of the main building
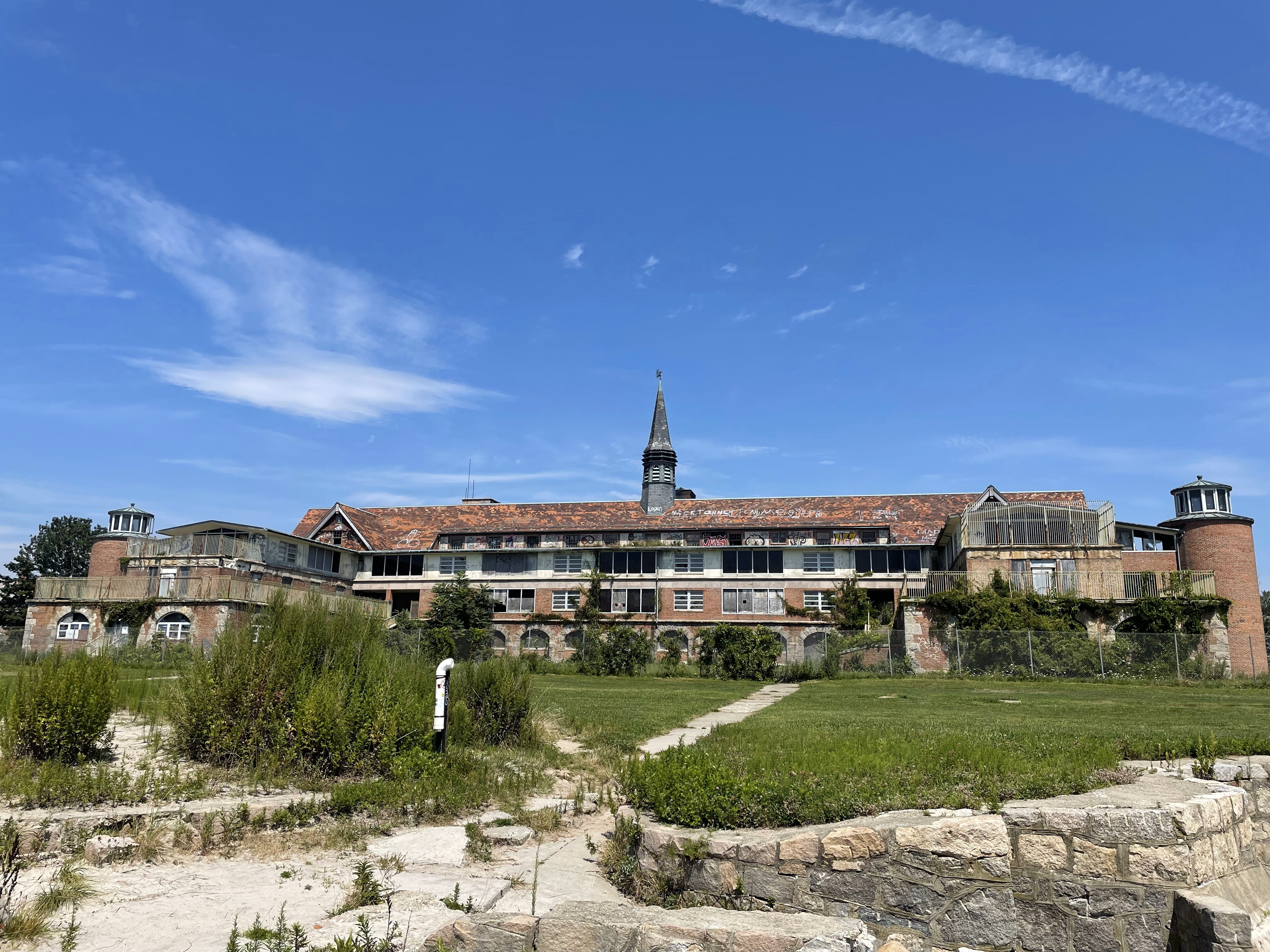

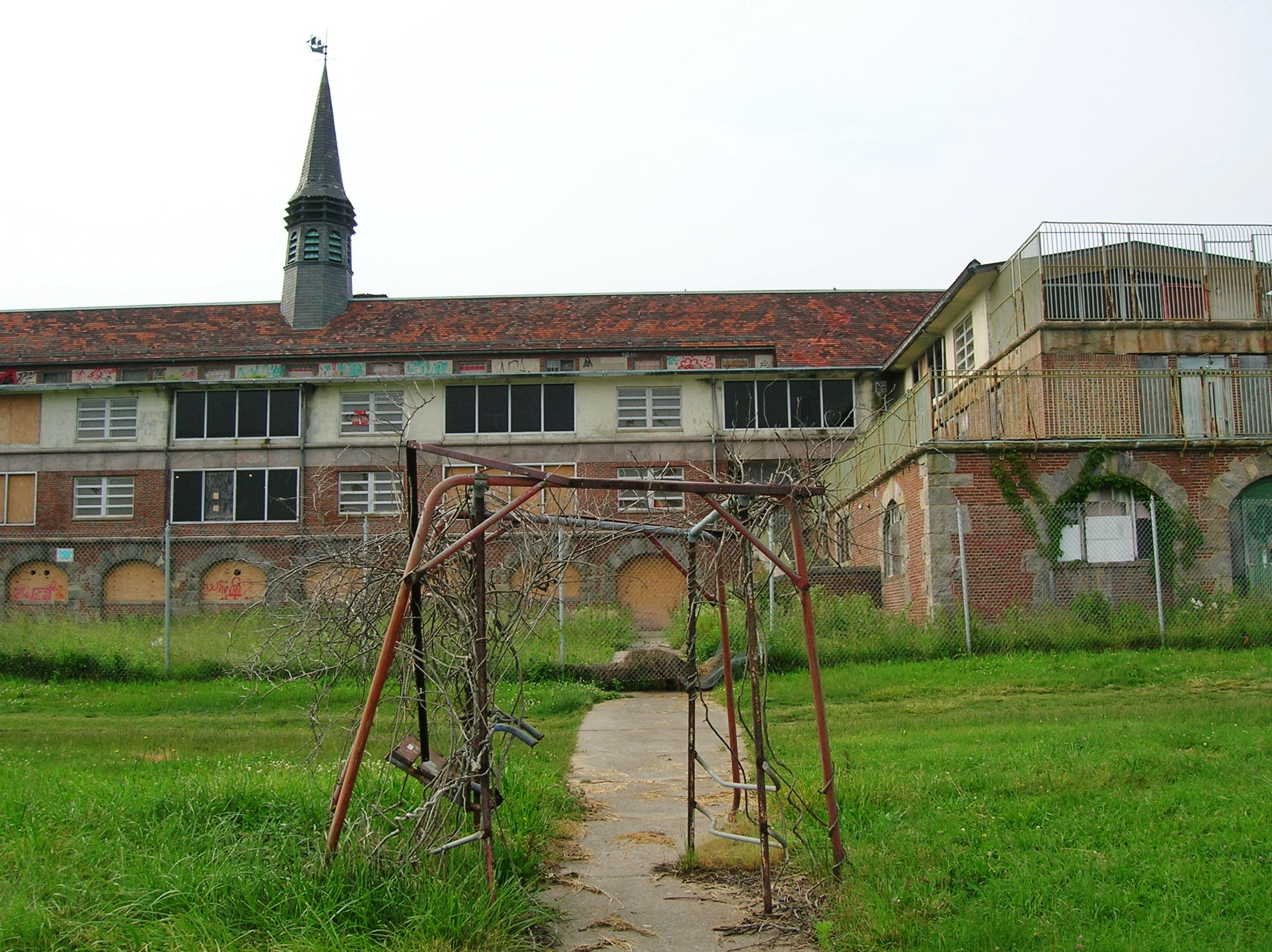

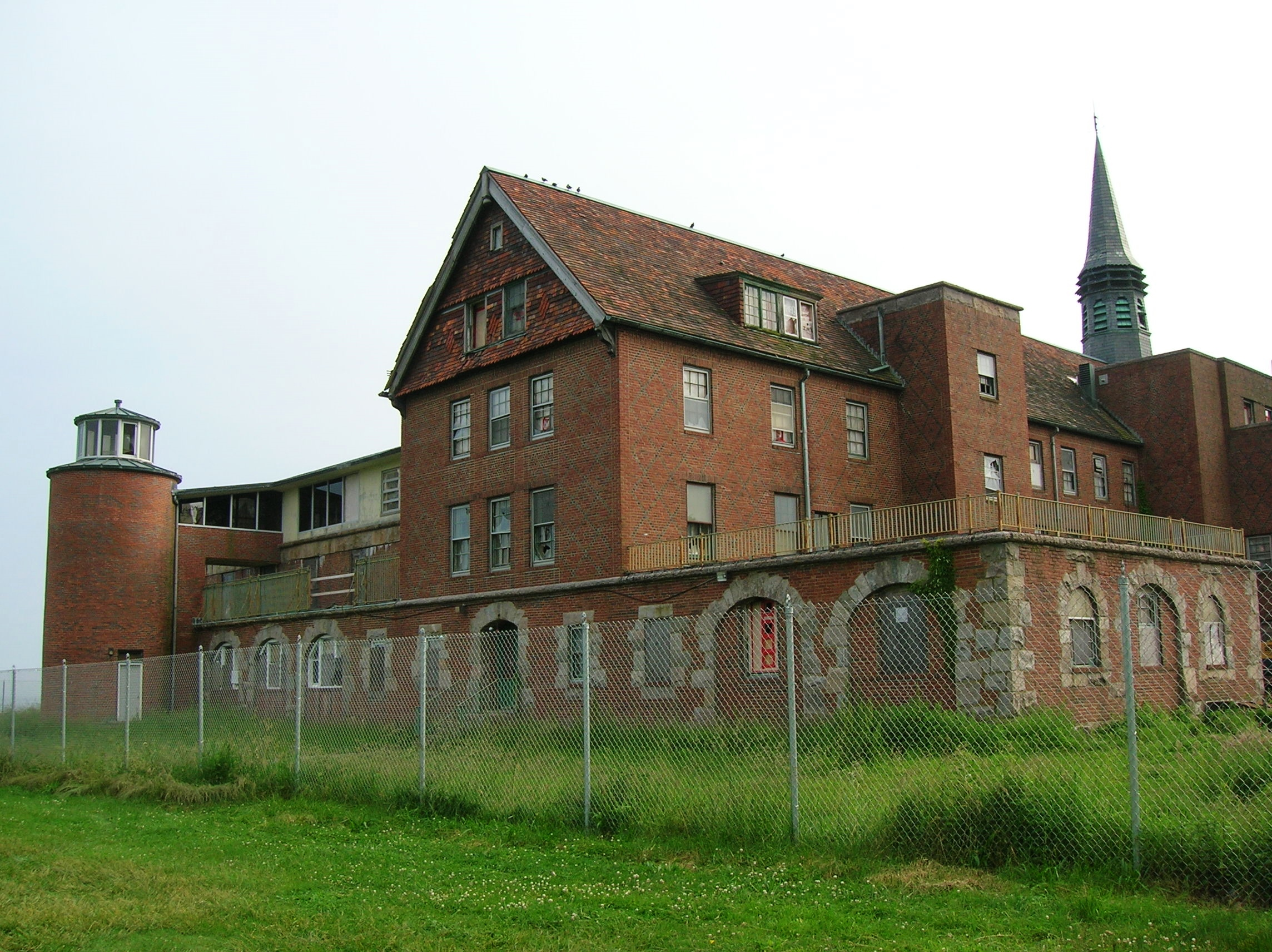
- Other buildings at the site
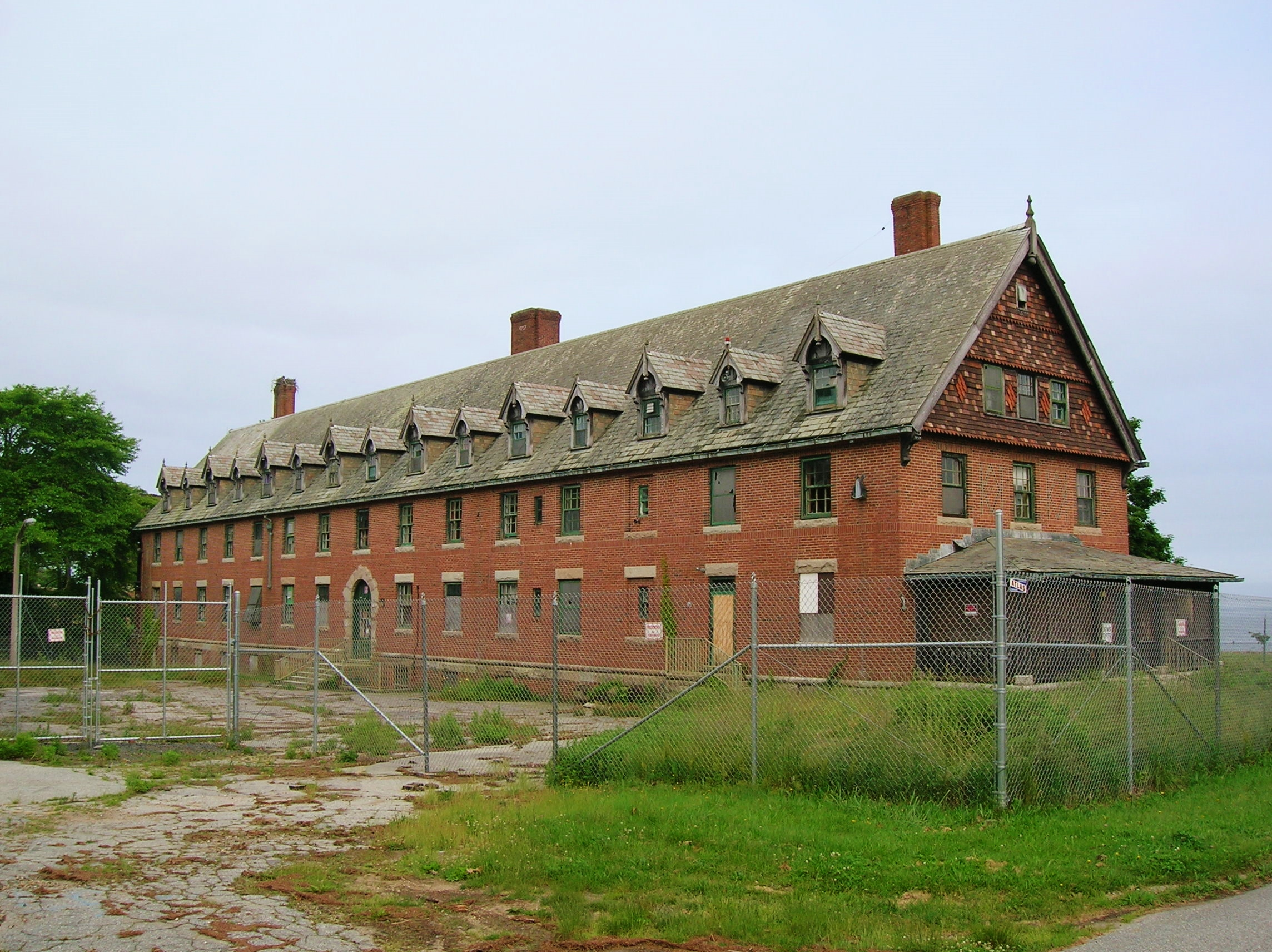

== See also ==
- National Register of Historic Places listings in New London County, Connecticut
