= Connecticut's 20th State Senate district =

American legislative district

Senator
Martha Max; D

Connecticut's 20th State Senate district elects one member of the Connecticut State Senate. It consists of the communities of New London, Salem, Bozrah, East Lyme, Old Lyme, Waterford, and parts of Old Saybrook and Montville. It has been represented by Democrat Martha Max since 2023.

== Recent elections ==
=== 2024 ===
2024 Connecticut State Senate election, District 20
Party	Candidate	Votes	%
Democratic	Martha Marx	26,599	53.60
Republican	Shaun Mastroianni	20,842	42.00
Working Families	Martha Marx	1,265	2.55
Independent Party	Shaun Mastroianni	915	1.84
Total votes		49,621	100.00
Democratic hold			

=== 2022 ===
2022 Connecticut State Senate election, District 20
Party	Candidate	Votes	%
Democratic	Martha Marx	19,103	50.65
Republican	Jerry Labriola Jr.	17,496	46.39
Independent Party	Jerry Labriola Jr.	505	1.34
Working Families	Martha Marx	609	1.61
Total votes		37,713	100.00
Democratic gain from			

=== 2020 ===
2020 Connecticut State Senate election, District 20
Party	Candidate	Votes	%
Democratic	Martha Marx	23,399	46.09
Republican	Paul M. Formica (incumbent)	25,680	50.58
Independent Party	Joseph Taraya	586	1.15
Working Families	Martha Marx	1,104	2.17
Total votes		50,769	100.00
Republican hold			

=== 2018 ===
2018 Connecticut State Senate election, District 20
Party	Candidate	Votes	%
Total	Paul Formica (incumbent)	20,746	52.0
Republican	Paul Formica	19,598	49.1
Independent	Paul Formica	1,148	2.9
Total	Martha Marx	19,164	48.0
Democratic	Martha Marx	18,203	45.6
Working Families	Martha Marx	961	2.4
Total votes		39,910	100.0
Republican hold			

=== 2016 ===
2016 Connecticut State Senate election, District 20
Party	Candidate	Votes	%
Democratic	Ryan Henowitz	17,761	40.13
Republican	Paul Formica (incumbent)	26,501	59.87
Total votes		44,262	100.00
Republican hold			

=== 2014 ===
2014 Connecticut State Senate election, District 20
Party	Candidate	Votes	%
Democratic	Elizabeth Ritter	13,077	41.7
Republican	Paul Formica	16,103	51.3
Independent Party	Paul Formica	1,404	4.5
Working Families	Elizabeth Ritter	804	2.6
Total votes		31,388	100.00
Republican gain from Democratic			

=== 2012 ===
2012 Connecticut State Senate election, District 20
Party	Candidate	Votes	%
Democratic	Andrea L. Stillman (incumbent)	24,222	60.2
Republican	Mike Doyle	15,323	38.1
Libertarian	Marc Guttman	665	1.7
Total votes		40,210	100.00
Democratic hold			
