= East Lyme Public Schools =

School district in Connecticut, United States

Address
- 165 Boston Post Road P.O. Box 220 East Lyme, Connecticut 06333-0176 United States

District information
- Type: Public
- Grades: Pre K-12
- Superintendent: Jeffrey Newton

East Lyme Public Schools is a school district in East Lyme, Connecticut, United States.

The district has one high school, one middle school, and three elementary schools. It is overseen by an elected 10-member board of education that serve four-year terms.

The district also serves high school students from Salem.

== High school ==
East Lyme High School (grades 9-12) is located in the village of Flanders section of East Lyme. The school mascot is Sven the Viking. It serves students from not only East Lyme but also the town of Salem, Connecticut, which has no high school of its own. The agreement with Salem to educate the town's high school students will continue until at least 2039, when the current co-operative agreement between the two towns expires.

The school's athletic teams have consistently placed among the top in the region, capturing titles in football, baseball, basketball, soccer, crew, swimming, volleyball, cross country, track, lacrosse, tennis, fencing, field hockey, wrestling, and marching band.

== Middle school ==
East Lyme Middle School (ELMS) enrolls grades 5–8. Its mascot has changed over time; it was originally the Sabers, then changed to Hawks, and is currently a Viking, to be similar to the high school. The school is housed in a building that was constructed in 2002.

The school is designed to employ kivas. In this design concept, small groups of students (approximately 80) are co-located in a classroom setting, where most of their daily instruction takes place. This setting, or kiva, consists of:

- four classrooms (one designed for science, one for mathematics, and two "linked classrooms" designed for social studies and language arts)
- restroom facilities
- media support facilities
- a common meeting area
- a teacher preparation area
- student lockers

Students do not intermingle among kivas, except for at lunch and special educational experiences. This system is criticized; some children will never meet others because each kiva stays together, only changing teachers. This structure allows a large physical plant to resemble a smaller school, while allowing students the learning opportunities (life skills, technology, art, music, and sports) available at a larger institution.

ELMS was designed to accommodate the 5th grade students from the town's three elementary schools (Lillie B. Haynes, Niantic Center School, and Flanders School) due to the overcrowding in these schools.

== Elementary schools ==
Elementary schools in East Lyme serve grades pre-K to 4. Originally they served pre-K to 5, but there was an overcrowding in the elementary schools, so when the new middle school was built it was designed to hold the 5th grade.

- Flanders School serves most of the village of Flanders. It is located an eighth of a mile west of Flanders four corners, and is adjacent to East Lyme High School and the school board offices.
- Lillie B. Haynes is located in the former East Lyme Middle School, next to the new East Lyme Middle School. The original Lille B. Haynes school building was constructed in 1952 and was demolished in the summer of 2002 to make way for the new middle school parking lot.
- Niantic Center School is located in the heart of Niantic, and serves most of Niantic. The school is represented by a scallop shell. It is the oldest of the town's school buildings, with a small portion having been constructed in 1899.
