= Pete Walker (baseball) =

American baseball player & coach (born 1969)

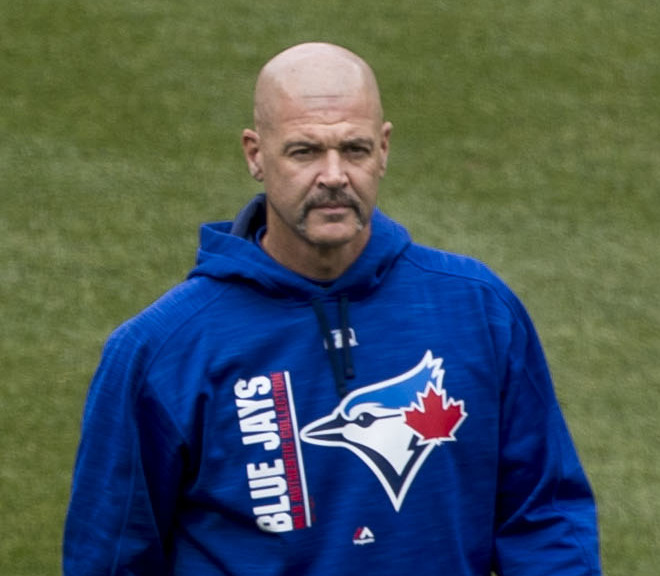
- Walker with the Toronto Blue Jays

Toronto Blue Jays – No. 41
- Pitcher / Pitching coach
- Born: April 8, 1969 (age 56); Beverly, Massachusetts, U.S.
- Batted: Right Threw: Right

Professional debut
- MLB: June 7, 1995, for the New York Mets
- NPB: April 3, 2004, for the Yokohama BayStars

Last appearance
- NPB: June 12, 2004, for the Yokohama BayStars
- MLB: July 7, 2006, for the Toronto Blue Jays

MLB statistics
- Win–loss record: 20–14
- Earned run average: 4.48
- Strikeouts: 191

NPB statistics
- Win–loss record: 2–4
- Earned run average: 6.80
- Strikeouts: 23
- Stats at Baseball Reference

Teams
- As player: New York Mets (1995); San Diego Padres (1996); Colorado Rockies (2000); New York Mets (2001–2002); Toronto Blue Jays (2002–2003); Yokohama BayStars (2004); Toronto Blue Jays (2005–2006); As coach: Toronto Blue Jays (2012–present)

Peter Brian Walker (born April 8, 1969) is an American former professional baseball relief pitcher and currently the pitching coach for the Toronto Blue Jays of Major League Baseball (MLB).

== Playing career ==
Walker graduated from East Lyme High School in East Lyme, Connecticut, and from Charter Oak State College. He played college baseball at the University of Connecticut and earned All-Tournament honors in the Huskies 1990 Big East Conference baseball tournament championship. Walker was drafted by the New York Mets in 1990 and made his MLB debut for them in 1995.

On March 17 1996, Walker was traded along with minor leaguer Scott Adair to the San Diego Padres for Roberto Petagine and minor leaguer Luis Arroyo. Walker played one game for the Padres before going to the minors. In 1997, Walker signed with the Boston Red Sox but never played for them at the major league level.

In 2000, Walker made his way back to the major league level with the Colorado Rockies after signing with them in 1998. In December 2000, Walker once again signed with the New York Mets and played 3 games for them before returning to the minors. On May 3, 2002, he was claimed off waivers by the Toronto Blue Jays, with whom he played 124 games between 2002 and 2006. He also played for the Yokohama BayStars of Nippon Professional Baseball in 2004, between his two stints with the Blue Jays.

On July 22, 2006, Walker had shoulder surgery. In 2006, the Toronto Blue Jays released him, but on February 12 2007, the Blue Jays signed him to a minor league contract with an invitation to spring training; he was released toward the end of spring training 2007. He signed with the New York Yankees on May 9, 2007.

=== Scouting report ===
Walker threw an 87–88 MPH four-seam fastball, an 81–83 MPH slider, an 80–82 MPH circle changeup, as well as the occasional 81–83 MPH split-finger fastball, and 83–85 MPH cutter.

== Post-playing career ==
On November 7, 2011, Walker was named bullpen coach for the Toronto Blue Jays, following a stint as the pitching coach for the Double-A New Hampshire Fisher Cats, which won the Eastern League title earlier that year.

On November 24, 2012, Walker was appointed as the pitching coach for the Blue Jays, replacing Bruce Walton.

== Personal life ==
On March 26, 2022, Walker was arrested in Pinellas County, Florida, and charged with driving under the influence.
