= East Lyme High School =

- Main entrance

Location
- 30 Chesterfield Road; East Lyme, Connecticut 06333; United States
- 41°22′07″N 72°12′38″W

Information
- Type: Public Secondary
- Motto: Learners Today, Leaders Tomorrow
- Established: 1967 (59 years ago)
- School district: East Lyme Public Schools
- CEEB code: 070177
- Principal: Henry Kydd III
- Grades: 9-12
- Gender: Co-educational
- Enrollment: 927 (2023-2024)
- Colors: Maroon and white
- Athletics: XC Class MM State Champions 2017, 2018, & 2019
- Athletics conference: Eastern Connecticut Conference
- Mascot: Sven The Viking
- Rival: Waterford High School
- Newspaper: Viking Saga
- Yearbook: Valhalla
- Website: highschool.eastlymeschools.org

East Lyme High School is a 9-12 high school in the Flanders Village region of East Lyme, Connecticut, United States. The school serves students from the towns of East Lyme and Salem, Connecticut. It is operated by East Lyme Public Schools. East Lyme High School has been open since 1967.

== Controversies ==
East Lyme High School students have been at the center of multiple controversies involving racism. During homecoming week in 2015, multiple students took part in a mock lynching on school grounds. As a response, representatives from the Anti-Defamation League were invited to lead a school-wide discussion on diversity.

In 2021, a student was charged with a hate crime for writing a racial slur on another student's car.

In 2021, around 250 students demonstrated a walkout on November 16, 2021, in response to the administration's inaction regarding racist text messages that circulated around the school that were authored by a student. A 15-year-old juvenile was charged with third-degree assault on a fellow student. The assailant was identified as the author of the previously mentioned racist messages.

In 2026, the school board voted 6-3 to arm the retired law enforcement officers who serve as school security personnel across the district's five public schools. The policy faced pushback from the community and dissenting board members who argued that firearms increase the risks to students, rather than help with safety. The policy was introduced and championed by Superintendent Jeffery R. Newton.

== Salem Schools Co-op Agreement ==
Since East Lyme High School's founding in 1967, students from the neighboring town of Salem have attended East Lyme High School from grades 9 through 12, due to Salem lacking a high school of their own. In 1997, East Lyme High School was formally recognized as the official high school of Salem Public Schools after an official agreement was established between the two towns. In 2016, a new co-op agreement between East Lyme and Salem was adopted such that Salem students can continue to attend East Lyme High School through June 2039.

== Notable alumni ==
- John McDonald, professional baseball player
- Jay Allen Sanford, author and cartoonist
- Carly Thibault-DuDonis, basketball coach
- Ed Toth, professional musician
- Pete Walker, professional baseball player
