= Rocky Neck State Park =

Public recreation area in Connecticut, US

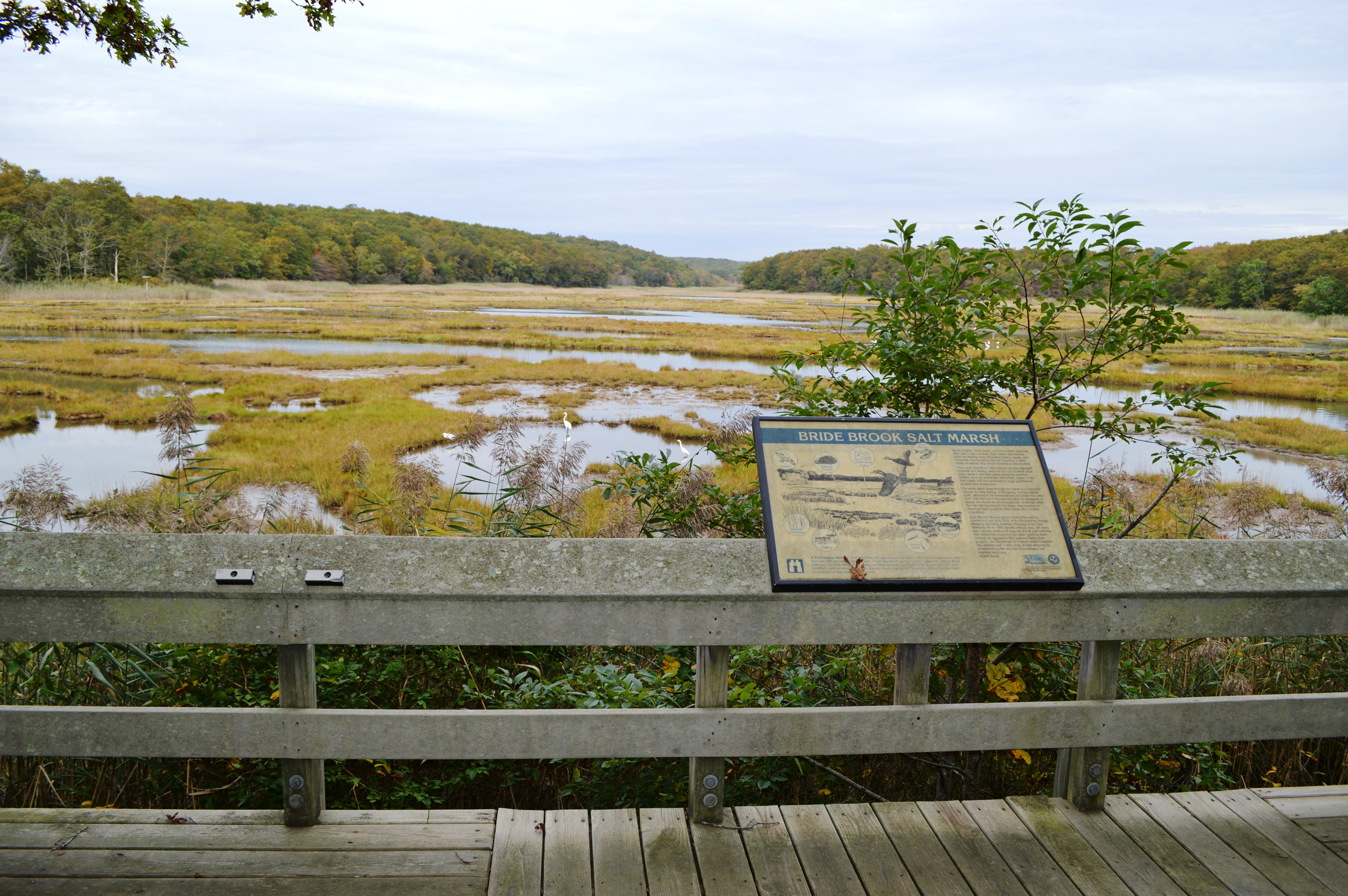
- Bride Brook Salt Marsh

- Location within Connecticut Location within the United States
- Location: East Lyme, Connecticut, United States
- Coordinates: 41°18′15″N 72°14′52″W
- Area: 708 acres (287 ha)
- Elevation: 66 feet (20 m)
- Established: 1931
- Administrator: Connecticut Department of Energy and Environmental Protection
- Designation: Connecticut state park
- Website: Official website
- Rocky Neck Pavilion
- U.S. National Register of Historic Places
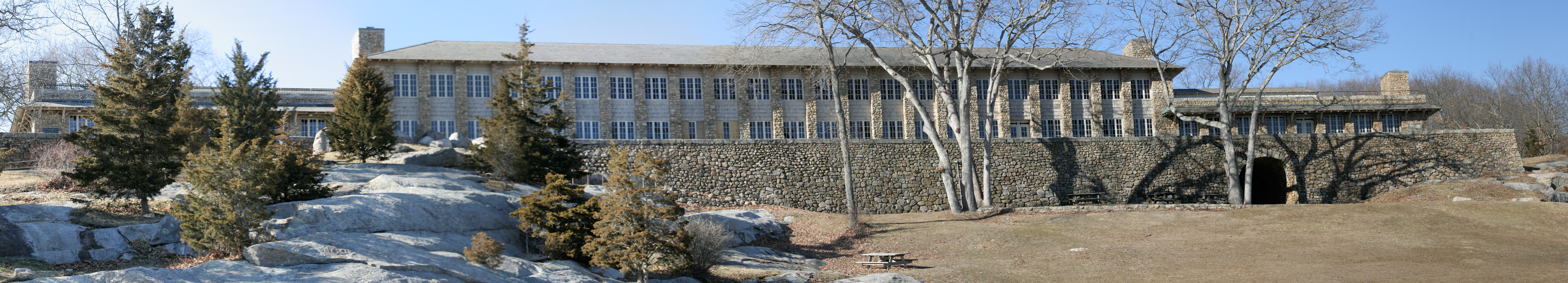
- Location: Lands End Point, Rocky Neck State Park, East Lyme, Connecticut
- Area: 6.5 acres (2.6 ha)
- Built: 1934
- Built by: Federal Emergency Relief; Administration (FERA), Civilian Works Administration (CWA)
- Architect: Barker, Russell F., et al.
- Architectural style: Rustic
- MPS: Connecticut State Park and Forest Depression-Era; Federal Work Relief; Programs Structures TR
- NRHP reference No.: 86001745
- Added to NRHP: September 4, 1986

Rocky Neck State Park is a public recreation area encompassing 710 acres (290 ha) on Long Island Sound in the town of East Lyme, Connecticut, United States. The park encompasses a white sand beach and small boardwalk, tidal river, a broad salt marsh, and a large stone pavilion dating from the 1930s. It is managed by the Connecticut Department of Energy and Environmental Protection.

== History ==
During the 19th century, various fertilizer operations occupied the site. The park traces its beginnings to 1931, when conservationists purchased the land and held it until the state legislature authorized state purchase. During the Great Depression, a 356-foot, timber-and-granite pavilion was constructed by federal relief workers.

== Features ==
Pavilion

The Ellie Mitchell Pavilion is a Rustic-style building completed in 1936 by the Works Progress Administration. The curved masonry building stands more than 350 feet (110 m) long and 80 feet (24 m) wide. It is the largest Depression-era structure in the state.

Construction began in the early 1930s as part of an effort to ease crowding at Hammonasset State Park. Much of its timber and granite were drawn from local suppliers and quarries and from an abandoned fish fertilizer plant on the grounds. Supporting pillars were fashioned from trees cut from each of the state parks and forests. The pavilion was handed over to the state in October 1936 and opened as the Ellie Mitchell Pavilion. Visitors could purchase food, eat in the dining areas, and warm themselves by eight fireplaces during cooler months. In 1986, the pavilion and its surrounding 6.5 acres (2.6 ha) were listed on the National Register of Historic Places.

Footbridge

The park is crossed by the Northeast Corridor, Amtrak's (~Mile Post 112.4) main line from New York to Boston, on a right-of-way first chartered in 1848 by the New Haven and New London Railroad. A 1934 footbridge carries pedestrians over the tracks between the pavilion and its parking lot. The 36-foot (11 m) arched steel bridge has been documented by the Historic American Engineering Record, which describes it as "an unusual surviving example of a railroad footbridge."

Access road

The park has its own exit (exit 72) on the Connecticut portion of Interstate 95. This exit is for the Rocky Neck connector, which is designated as the unsigned Connecticut Special Service Road 449.

== Activities and amenities ==
A long white sand beach with a boardwalk is the main draw at Rock Neck State Park. The beach sees the most activity from May through November, while the camp grounds are normally popular in the summer. The park offers picnicking, saltwater fishing, saltwater swimming, a campground with 160 sites, and interpretive programs. Hiking trails lead to a salt marsh, Baker's Cave, Shipyard, and other points of interest.

== See also ==
- List of bridges documented by the Historic American Engineering Record in Connecticut
- National Register of Historic Places listings in New London County, Connecticut
