= Paul Formica =

American politician

Member of the Connecticut State Senate from the 20th district
- In office January 12, 2015 – January 4, 2023
- Preceded by: Andrea Stillman
- Succeeded by: Martha Marx
- Constituency: represents Bozrah, East Lyme, Montville (part), New London, Old Lyme, Old Saybrook (part), Salem, and Waterford

Personal details
- Born: Cheshire, Connecticut, US
- Party: Republican
- Children: 4

Paul Formica is an American restaurateur and former Republican member of the Connecticut State Senate, representing the 20th District since 2015. Previously, Formica was the First Selectman of the town of East Lyme from 2007 to 2015.

== Early life ==
Formica grew up in Cheshire, Connecticut, and graduated from Cheshire High School in 1971.

== Career ==
Since 1983, Formica is the owner and operator of Flanders Fish Market & Restaurant.

In 2007, Formica became the First Selectman of East Lyme Town Hall.

On November 4, 2014, Formica won the election as the state senator of Connecticut. On January 12, 2015, Formica became the State Senator for the 20th Senate District. Formica represented parts of southeastern Connecticut in the Senate, including the towns of Bozrah, East Lyme, Montville (part), New London, Old Lyme, Old Saybrook (part), Salem, and Waterford.

On November 5, 2021, Formica was selected by the Senate Republican caucus to serve as the deputy leader, taking the title of Senate Republican Leader Pro Tempore. In January 2022, he declared that he would not seek reelection in November.

== Personal life ==
Formica has three daughters and a son. His wife, Donna Formica, died in 2009.
