= East Lyme, Connecticut =

- Town
- Town of East Lyme
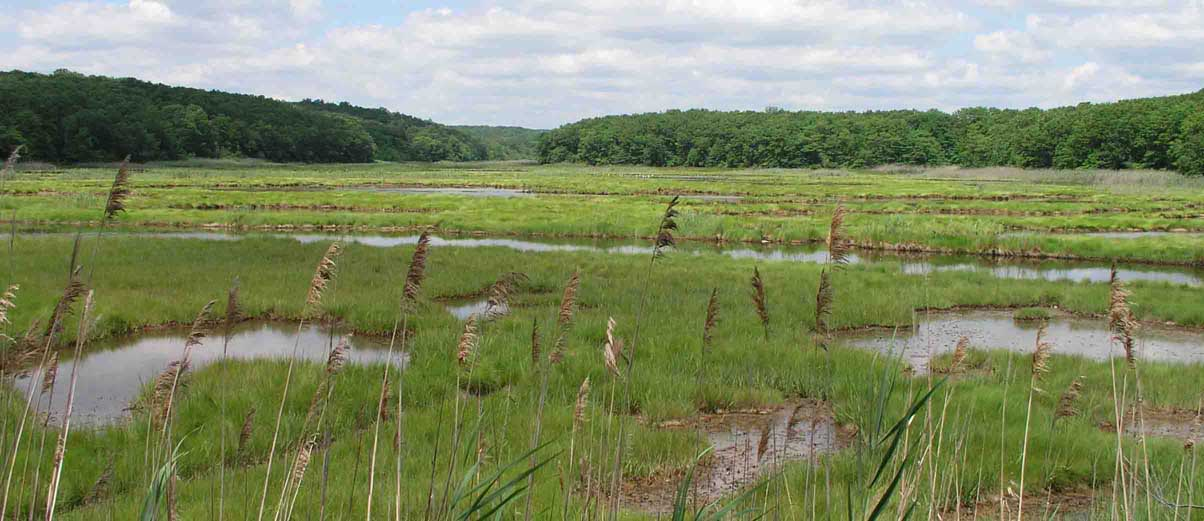
- Salt marsh in East Lyme

- Flag Seal
- Interactive map of East Lyme, Connecticut
- Coordinates: 41°21′11″N 72°13′46″W
- Country: United States
- U.S. state: Connecticut
- County: New London
- Region: Southeastern CT
- Incorporated: 1839

Government
  - Type: Selectman-town meeting
  - First selectman: Dan Cunningham (D)

Area
  - Total: 42.0 sq mi (108.8 km^{2})
  - Land: 34.0 sq mi (88.1 km^{2})
  - Water: 8.0 sq mi (20.6 km^{2})
- Elevation: 210 ft (64 m)

Population (2020)
  - Total: 18,693
  - Density: 550/sq mi (212/km^{2})
- Time zone: UTC-5 (Eastern)
  - Summer (DST): UTC-4 (Eastern)
- ZIP Codes: 06333, 06357
- Area codes: 860/959
- FIPS code: 09-23400
- GNIS feature ID: 0213426
- Website: eltownhall.com

East Lyme is a town in New London County, Connecticut, United States. The town is part of the Southeastern Connecticut Planning Region. Its population was 18,693 at the 2020 census. The villages of Niantic and Flanders are located in the town.

== Geography ==
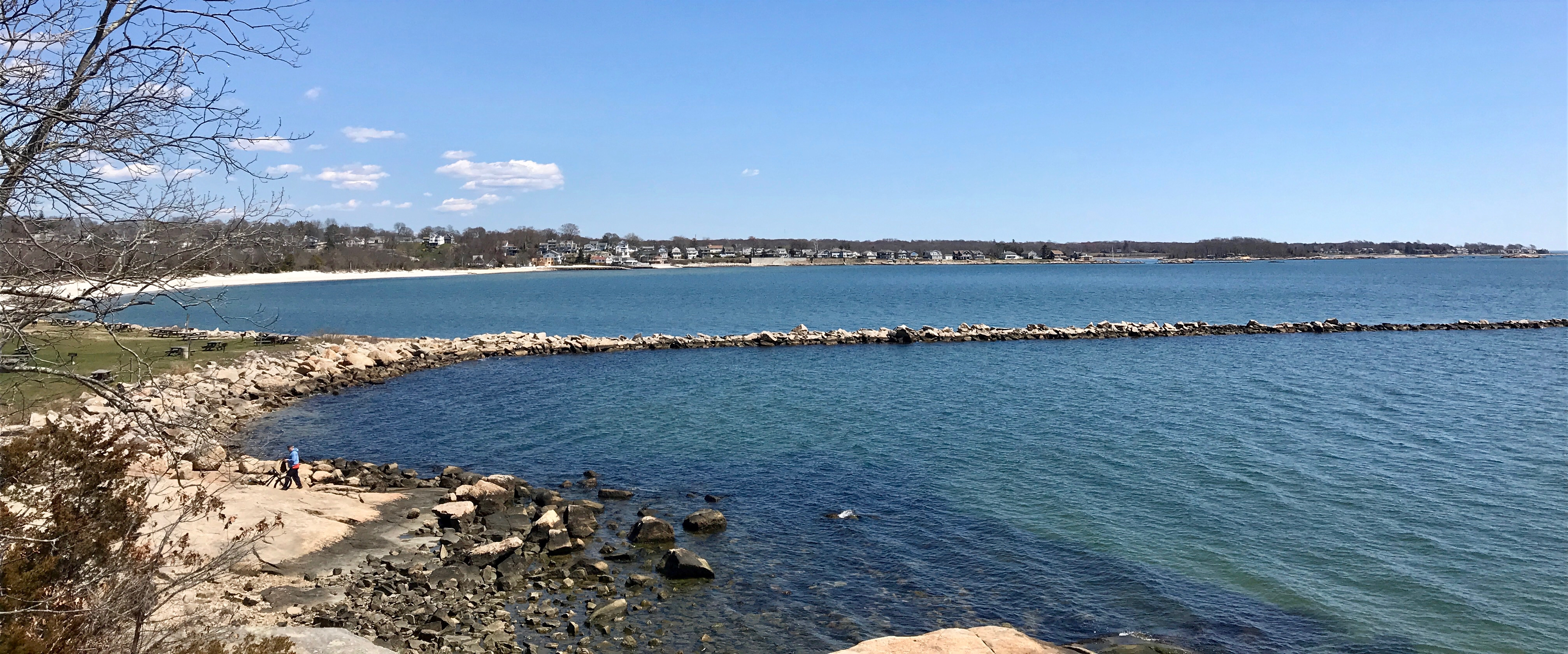
View of the Rocky Neck State Park Jetty, beach and the Giants Neck area shoreline in the Niantic section of East Lyme, Connecticut.

East Lyme is located in southern New London County, west of Waterford and Montville, east of Lyme and Old Lyme, and south of Salem. Long Island Sound is to the south. According to the United States Census Bureau, the town has a total area of 42.0 square miles (109 km^{2}), of which 7.9 square miles (20 km^{2}), or 19%, are covered by water.

=== Villages ===
The town consists primarily of two villages, Flanders and Niantic. The town of East Lyme commonly erroneously is called "Niantic", due to this side of town being the "beach" side, which is popular with tourists and visitors in the summer. Niantic's population doubles in the summers for the beach season, and it has a much higher density than the more sparsely populated Flanders side of town, which is known for its apple orchards, the town's high school, and the forest.

==== Niantic ====
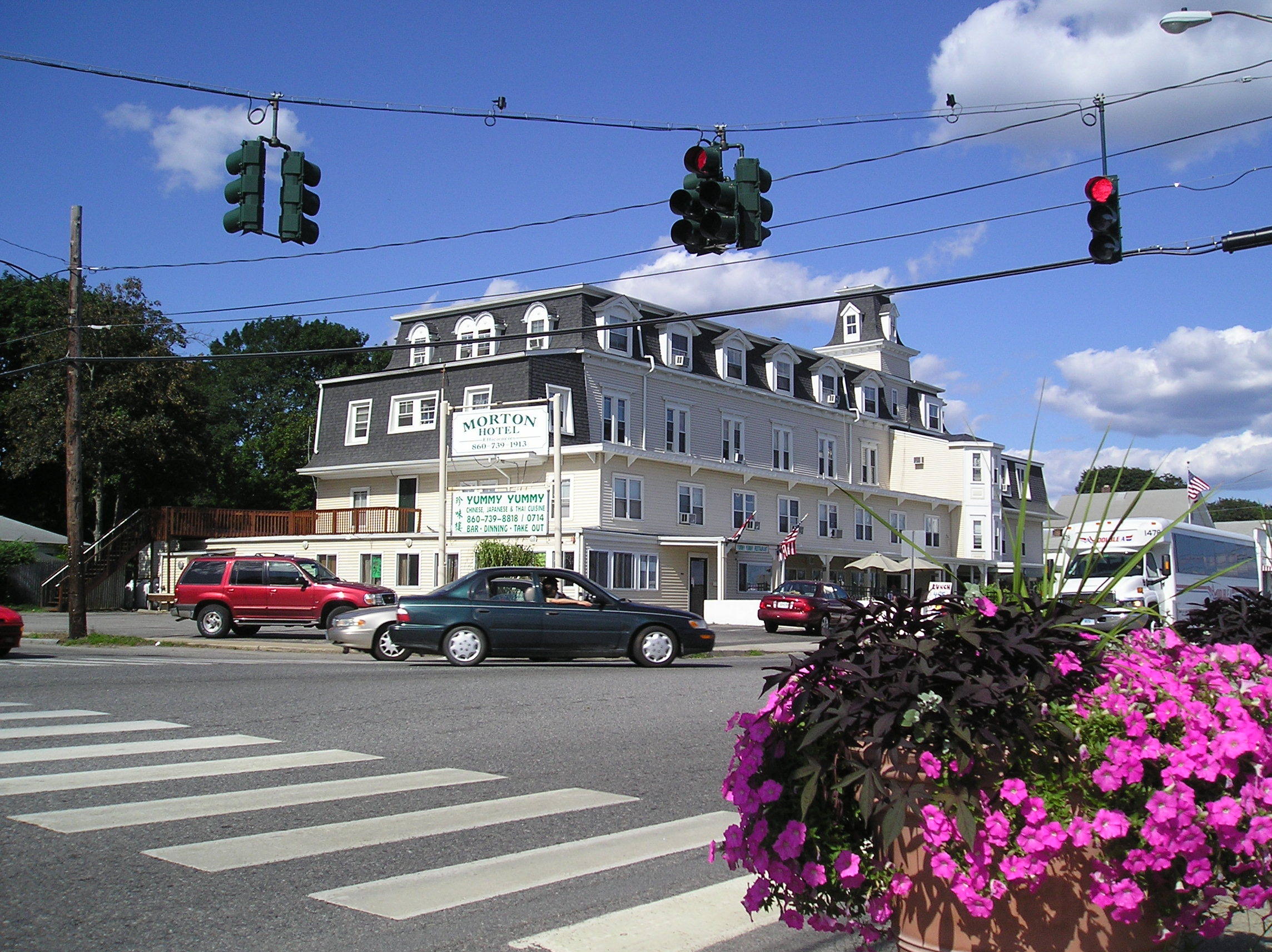
The Morton House Hotel in the village of Niantic has been in continuous operation for more than 100 years.

The village of Niantic gets its name from the Niantic or Nehantic people, whose ranging grounds once extended from Wecapaug Brook, in what is now Rhode Island, to the Connecticut River. Shortly before the first settlers arrived, the Pequots had invaded Nehantic territory and annexed about half of the land claimed by the tribe. According to local historian Olive Tubbs Chendali:

It was the construction of the railroad in 1851 that lured people to the shoreline which up to this time had been known - not as Niantic - but as "The Bank". Long before this time, however, as evidenced by The Diary of Joshua Hempstead - 1711 - 1758 it was known as "Nahantick" "Nyantick" or "Nehantic", the home territory of the Nehantic Indians.

Sportfishing and marinas dominate the village's industry, along with summer tourism and restaurant trade. Strong regional businesses include seafood restaurants and hotels/motels serving the town's beaches and the casinos at Foxwoods and Mohegan Sun. Rocky Neck State Park features camping, swimming, and picnic areas along with numerous marinas and sportfishing companies.

The Niantic Bay Boardwalk is a one-mile-long (1.6 km) walkway that runs parallel to Amtrak’s shoreline railroad tracks and spans Niantic Bay from the Niantic River inlet to Hole-in-the-Wall municipal beach. It first opened to the public in 2005, but was closed from about 2011 due to a combination of Amtrak building a new railroad bridge across the Niantic River, which required a repositioning of the approach tracks, and damage caused by Hurricane Irene in October 2011. The boardwalk fully reopened to the public in March 2016.

The Children's Museum of Southeastern Connecticut is located in East Lyme's original public library on Main Street. The museum is aimed primarily at children up to 10 years old. The current public library is located on Society Road, away from Niantic.

The village of Niantic includes the beach communities of Attawan Beach, Black Point, Crescent Beach, Giants Neck Beach, Giants Neck Heights, Oak Grove Beach, Old Black Point, Pine Grove, and Saunder's Point.

East Lyme and Niantic station was an Amtrak station that closed in 1981. Currently, proposals to rebuild the station have been made to accommodate Shore Line East trains.

==== Flanders ====
The village of Flanders, originally a farming area along the Old Post Road, gets its name from the development of woolen mills similar to those in Flanders, Belgium. The heart of the village is located at Flanders Four Corners at the intersection of Chesterfield Road (Route 161) and Boston Post Road (Route 1). This area is the site of many small stores and businesses, as well as East Lyme High School, Flanders Elementary School, and the Board of Education.

Flanders was the original center of East Lyme society, with dozens of 18th-century homes, shops, and public inns situated along the Boston Post Road until the early 1800s. It lost its pre-eminence as Niantic began to flourish, first with the growth of commercial fishing and then with the construction of the Shore Line Railway. Many of the original Flanders homes have been lost as a result of the construction of Interstate 95 in the 1950s and subsequent commercial construction at the Four Corners area. For example, the old Caulkins Tavern stood at the site of the current CVS and was a well-traveled and documented stopping place in the 18th century from none other than Sarah Kemble Knight in her diary, as well as General George Washington, who stopped here with thousands of troops in 1776. Some homes remain closer to the Waterford line at the site of the old Beckwith Shipyard at the head of the Niantic River.

==== Other minor communities ====
Golden Spur, a community located at the head of the Niantic River, earned it its other name, "Head of the River". In the 18th century, it was the site of the Beckwith shipyard. By the turn of the 20th century, it was the site of an amusement park accessible by trolley run by the East Lyme Street Railway. The park operated until 1924.

=== Topography ===
The topography of East Lyme consists of rolling hills and lush valleys rounded by glaciers during the last ice age. Hills rise to elevations of 250 to 350 feet (76 to 107 m) above sea level in the eastern and central areas of the town. The highest point in town is an unnamed hill with an elevation of 500 feet (150 m) located in Nehantic State Forest in the northwest corner of the town. East Lyme is especially scenic in the summer when the trees are in bloom. On its eastern and southern sides, the town abuts tidewater. The tidal Niantic River on the east feeds Niantic Bay, an arm of Long Island Sound, which forms the southern edge of the town.

== Demographics ==
Historical population
Census	Pop.	Note	%±
1850	1,382		—
1860	1,506		9.0%
1870	1,506		0.0%
1880	1,731		14.9%
1890	2,048		18.3%
1900	1,836		−10.4%
1910	1,916		4.4%
1920	2,291		19.6%
1930	2,575		12.4%
1940	3,338		29.6%
1950	3,870		15.9%
1960	6,782		75.2%
1970	11,399		68.1%
1980	13,870		21.7%
1990	15,340		10.6%
2000	18,118		18.1%
2010	19,159		5.7%
2020	18,693		−2.4%
U.S. Decennial Census

As of the 2000 census, 18,118 people, 6,308 households, and 4,535 families resided in the town. The population density was 532.3 inhabitants per square mile (205.5/km^{2}). The 7,459 housing units had an average density of 219.2 per square mile (84.6/km^{2}). The racial makeup of the town was 87.29% White, 6.37% African American, 0.44% Native American, 2.82% Asian, 0.04% Pacific Islander, 1.21% from other races, and 1.83% from two or more races. Hispanics or Latinos of any race were 4.59% of the population.

Of the 6,308 households, 33.1% had children under 18 living with them, 61.0% were married couples living together, 8.4% had a female householder with no husband present, and 28.1% were not families. About 23.3% of all households were made up of individuals, and 8.8% had someone living alone who was 65 or older. The average household size was 2.50, and the average family size was 2.96.

In the town, the age distribution was 21.9% under 18, 6.3% from 18 to 24, 33.4% from 25 to 44, 25.8% from 45 to 64, and 12.6% who were 65 or older. The median age was 39 years. For every 100 females, there were 92.7 males. For every 100 females 18 and over, there were 90.8 males.

The median income in the town for a household was $66,539 and for a family was $74,430. Males had a median income of $53,333 versus $37,162 for females. The per capita income for the town was $28,765. About 1.7% of families and 2.9% of the population were below the poverty line, including 3.0% of those under 18 and 3.5% of those 65 or over.

Voter Registration and Party Enrollment as of October 27, 2020
Party	Active voters	Inactive voters	Total voters	Percentage
Democratic	4,538	201	4,739	32.85%
Republican	3,141	193	3,334	23.11%
Unaffiliated	5,828	337	6,165	42.73%
Minor Parties (Green, Libertarian, Independent)	181	9	190	1.32%
Total	13,688	740	14,428	100%

Presidential Election Results
Year	Democratic	Republican	Third Parties
2020	62.0% 7,290	36.4% 4,285	1.6% 181
2016	54.0% 5,512	41.3% 4,214	4.7% 474
2012	57.6% 5,426	41.3% 3,886	1.1% 101
2008	60.4% 5,961	38.7% 3,819	0.9% 92
2004	56.1% 5,306	42.6% 4,030	1.3% 120
2000	52.4% 4,546	40.5% 3,513	7.1% 605
1996	48.9% 3,778	37.1% 2,870	14.0% 1,072
1992	40.9% 3,425	32.5% 2,717	26.6% 2,214
1988	44.6% 3,266	53.9% 3,954	1.5% 105
1984	36.0% 2,513	63.6% 4,438	0.4% 21
1980	31.9% 2,192	49.8% 3,419	18.3% 1,254
1976	41.3% 2,648	58.1% 3,727	0.6% 36
1972	30.7% 1,743	69.0% 3,918	0.3% 11
1968	39.2% 1,797	54.3% 2,491	6.5% 297
1964	56.8% 2,195	43.2% 1,674	0.00% 0
1960	35.1% 1,186	64.9% 2,198	0.00% 0
1956	24.4% 657	75.6% 2,036	0.00% 0

== Schools ==
The town's public schools are operated by the East Lyme School District.

The district consists of one high school - East Lyme High School, one middle school - East Lyme Middle School (grades 5–8), and three elementary schools:

- Flanders Elementary School (prekindergarten-grade 4),
- Lillie B. Haynes Elementary School (prekindergarten-grade 4), and
- Niantic Center School (kindergarten-grade 4).

East Lyme High School has been recognized by Newsweek as one of the top 1,000 high schools in the country and by U.S. News & World Report as one of the top 500 high schools in the United States. In 2017, the East Lyme High School earned a National Blue Ribbon Distinction by U.S. Department of Education. The awards are for schools that continue to show high achievement or make strong progress toward closing achievements gaps.

East Lyme High School hosts the East Lyme Aquatic and Fitness Center. The center contains an eight-lane, 25-yard-long (23 m), competition swimming and diving pool, and a fitness facility with Nautilus equipment, free weights, and a cardiovascular line. The facility is used by high school swimming and diving teams, as well as being open to the public, on a fee basis, when not in use by the school. East Lyme High School athletic teams have recently won the Class L state championships in girls' volleyball for the 2010 and 2011 seasons, and reached the Class M state finals in girls' tennis in 2012. The baseball team also reached the Class L state finals in 2015 and 2016. The cross-country running team has achieved unparalleled athletic success at East Lyme, winning consecutive Class MM State titles in 2017, 2018, and 2019. Students from the neighboring town of Salem also attend East Lyme High School.

The East Lyme Middle School is a 1999–2000 National Blue Ribbon School and a 2004 New England League of Middle Schools Spotlight School. It is also the Connecticut Association of Schools 2013–2014 School of the Year. It includes a high-technology computer laboratory and a spacious library.

The middle school uses a team program called kivas. A kiva contains a science teacher, a language-arts or English teacher, a social-studies teacher, and a mathematics teacher. Some kivas are smaller and have a math and science teacher and a language-arts and social-studies teacher. The 11 kivas consist of two types - multiage looping and two-year looping. The last kiva is a world language kiva where students can study French or Spanish.

== History ==
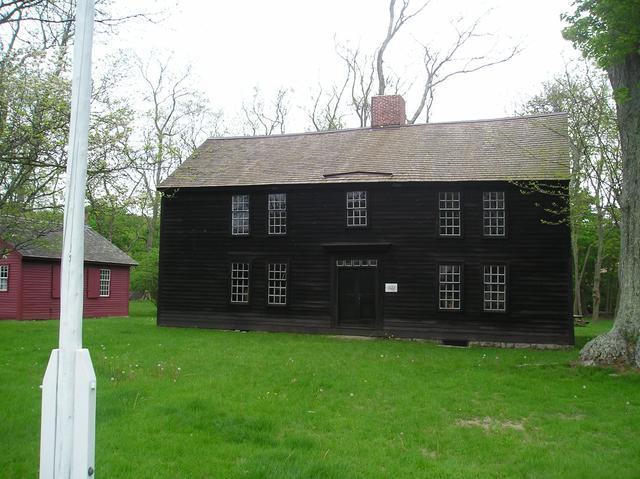
Thomas Lee House

The Thomas Lee House, built c. 1660, is the oldest house in Connecticut that is still in its primitive state. This building is located in the southwestern section of East Lyme, adjacent to Rocky Neck State Park, at the intersection of Route 156 and Giants Neck Road. Co-located on this site is the one-room Little Boston Schoolhouse, which was relocated to its current location from across Route 156. The town features six homes from 1699 or earlier, and the Old Stone Church Burial Ground from 1719 located off Society and Riverview Roads.

The area occupied by the town was originally inhabited by the Nehantic people, who maintained villages in the present-day Indian Woods section, as well as on Black Point, in the McCook's Beach area and near the Niantic River. The tribe allied itself with the colonists in the 1636 war against the Pequot people. The Nehantic were reported to have died out in the mid-19th century, but a Nehantic community still exists today. The 1750s Ezra Stiles map shows the Nehantic village in what is now Indian Woods as consisting of "12 or 13 huts".

Flanders had several taverns, which offered stopping places for travelers such as Sarah Kemble Knight. These included Calkins Tavern on what is now Boston Post Road, Royce's Tavern, and Taber Tavern near present-day I-95. At least 45 Revolutionary War veterans are buried within the borders of East Lyme, and countless more veterans from East Lyme found resting places in upstate New York, New Hampshire, and Ohio. Moses Warren, along with General Samuel Holden Parsons, originally of Lyme, and Moses Cleaveland, set out to survey the Ohio Territory in the latter part of the 1790s and has Warren County, Ohio, named after him. Cleveland, Ohio, is named after Moses Cleaveland.

The town of East Lyme was formally founded in 1839, merging parts of Lyme east of Four-mile River with parts of Waterford between Niantic Bay and Wigwam Rock. This line itself was said to have been moved from Bride Brook to Wigwam Rock after Lyme's best boxers defeated New London's best boxers in a match in the early 1700s.

=== Notable locations ===
- Morton Freeman Plant Hunting Lodge was built in 1908 and added to the National Register of Historic Places (NRHP) in 1988.
- Samuel Smith House was built in 1685, added to the NRHP in 1979.
- Smith-Harris House, built in 1845, is a Greek Revival home added as the "Thomas Avery House" to the NRHP in 1979.
- Thomas Lee House, built c. 1664, was added to the NRHP in 1970. It is one of the oldest houses in the state.
- The William Gorton Farm was added to the NRHP in 1984.

== Media ==
=== Library ===
The first library, started in 1888, was called the Niantic Library and Reading Room Association; it had 65 founding members. In 1897, the library was formally incorporated as the "Niantic Public Library Association" by the state of Connecticut. The library moved a few times until a permanent structure was built in 1920 on Main Street. In 1966, a wing was added, and in 1979, another addition was made. In 1990, the library moved into the new Community Center/Library complex, where it exists today.

=== Radio ===
FM station WNLC is based in East Lyme.

=== Movies ===
Portions of the made-for-TV movie Disaster on the Coastliner, released October 29, 1979, were filmed in East Lyme. In 2016, East Lyme was used as a filming location for the Lifetime thriller Hunter's Cove, which was renamed Stalker's Prey when it was released on February 9, 2017.

== Economy ==
According to 2009 statistics 42.2 percent of the town's business was focused in the services industry. A service industry is a business that focuses on retail, food services, distribution, and transportation. The second largest sector is the trade industry with 23.1% of the town's business, followed by construction and mining which accounts for 12.5% of the town businesses.

The largest employer in town is the state of Connecticut's Department of Corrections, which runs a women's prison in the west end of town, York Correctional Institution. The Gates Correctional Institute for men, also in town, closed in 2011.

== Beaches ==
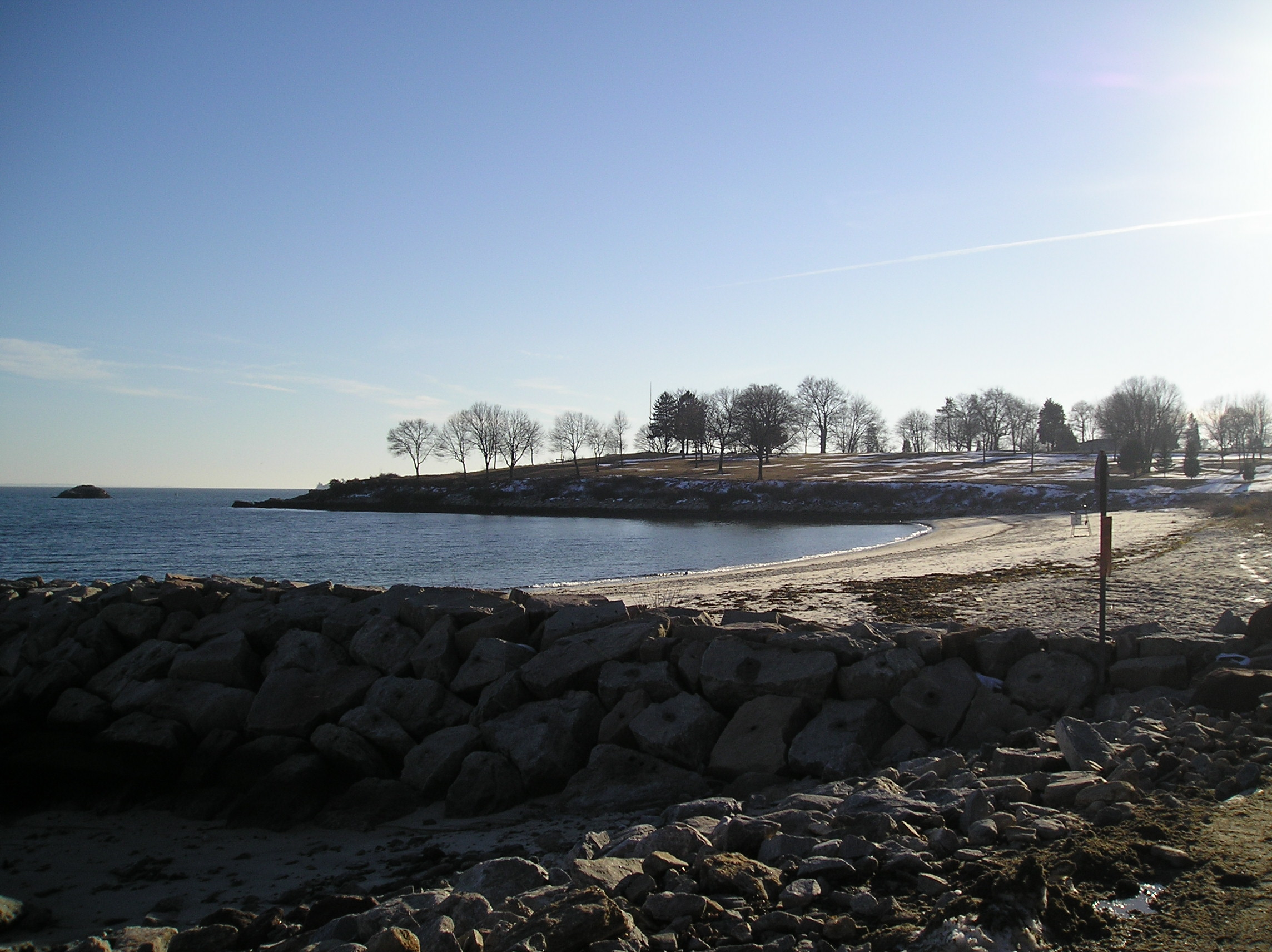
Hole-in-the-Wall Beach in Niantic, looking west towards McCook Point

=== Public beaches ===
- Rocky Neck State Park – a state park comprising East Beach and West Beach
- McCook Park Beach – locally known as "McCook's", located on the western side of McCook Point Park, and immediately adjacent to the private Crescent Beach. This beach, along with its associated public park, was acquired by the town of East Lyme in 1953 from the estate of the McCook Family. This beach is open to the public, on a fee basis, between Memorial Day and Labor Day, and is open free of charge during all other times. Access to this beach is controlled via locked gate. The normal park hours are 8:00 a.m. until dusk each day.
- Hole-in-the-Wall Beach – an approximately 5-acre (2.0 ha) beach that adjoins McCook Point Park. It is open to the public, on a fee basis, between Memorial Day and Labor Day. The normal park hours are 8:00 a.m. until dusk. Access is through a walkway underneath railroad tracks used by Amtrak's Northeast Corridor. The tunnel is located at the end of Baptist Lane. Free public parking is available, but entrance to the beach is monitored during the summer to ensure people entering have paid for access. It also provides access to the Niantic Beach Boardwalk that was built along the shoreline connecting with Railroad Beach. Known as the Niantic Bay Overlook, it is approximately 1.0 miles (1.6 km) long. The Overlook parallels the north shore of Niantic Bay and runs adjacent to the Northeast Corridor Amtrak line and consists of an elevated boardwalk and a level stone-dust-filled walkway.
- Railroad Beach – the beach at the eastern end of the Niantic Bay Overlook, locally known as "Railroad Beach" due to its proximity with the Niantic Railroad Drawbridge and the Amtrak Northeast Corridor mainline. Access to this beach is from the Niantic Bay Overlook via Hole-in-the-Wall Beach or from Cini Park via the walkway under the railroad drawbridge.

=== Private beaches ===
- Crescent Beach – adjacent to McCooks; reserved for homeowners in the area
- Oak Grove Beach
- Black Point Beach – for members of the Black Point Beach Club Association
- Old Black Point Beach – for homeowners in Old Black Point.
- Attawan Beach – adjacent to Black Point; for homeowners in the Attawan Beach Community
- Giants Neck Heights Beach – for members of the Giants Neck Heights Association. Located at the southeastern end of the Rocky Neck beach. It features a jetty that is popular with local crabbers and amateur photographers—and seagulls who drop clams and mussels on the cement surface to crack them open for eating. Use of this beach is restricted to the approximately 400 homeowners of the Giants Neck Height Association.
- Pine Grove – For members of the Pine Grove Beach Association
- Oswegatchie Hills Club – For the families living in Saunders Point, between Smith Cove and Niantic Bay.

== Notable people ==
- William Colepaugh (1918–2005), Nazi sympathizer who grew up on Black Point and traveled to Germany in 1944 to be trained as a spy
- Tom Danielson (born 1978), professional cyclist for Team Garmin, finishing 8th in the 2011 Tour de France
- John Ellis (born 1948), Former Major League Baseball player and cleanup hitter for the New York Yankees in the 1970's. Founder of the CT Sports Foundation against Cancer
- Pete Walker (born 1969), Former Major League Baseball player and current Pitching Coach for the Toronto Blue Jays
- John McDonald (born 1974), Former Major League Baseball player and current Infield Coach for the Cleveland Indians
- Rajai Davis (born 1980), Major League Baseball player for the Cleveland Indians. Hit a game tying home run in Game 7 of the 2016 World Series against the ultimately victorious Chicago Cubs
- Madeline Guarraia (2007-2016) childhood cancer awareness activist
- Charles Drake (real name Charles Ruppert) (1917–1994), actor in over 80 films and numerous television shows
- Otto Graham (1921–2003), Hall of Fame professional football player
- Anne Rogers Minor (1864–1947), artist, national president of the Daughters of the American Revolution from 1920 to 1923
- Jay Allen Sanford, author and cartoonist best known as the co-creator of Rock 'N' Roll Comics, and for his work with Revolutionary Comics, Carnal Comics, and the San Diego Reader
- Emily Steel, journalist at The New York Times, whose investigative work forced Fox News commentator Bill O'Reilly out of the network in April 2017
- James Stevenson (1929–2017), illustrator and author of over 100 children's books whose cartoons appear regularly in The New Yorker
- Ed Toth, drummer currently with The Doobie Brothers, formerly with Vertical Horizon and Jennifer Culture
- Jeremy Powers, East Lyme native and former professional racing cyclist, who possesses the most wins by an American male cyclo-cross rider
- Vladimir Peter Tytla (1904–1968), known as Bill Tytla, one of the original Disney animators

== Places of worship ==
- Christ Lutheran Church; 24 Society Road, Niantic, CT 06357; Lutheran Church Missouri Synod
- Flanders Baptist Church; 138 Boston Post Road, East Lyme, CT 06333; Baptist
- Saint Matthias Church; 317 Chesterfield Road, East Lyme, CT 06333; Roman Catholic
- Saint Matthias Parish Center; 317 Chesterfield Road, East Lyme, CT 06333; Roman Catholic
- Niantic Community Church; 170 Pennsylvania Avenue, Niantic CT 06357; United Methodist Church & United Church of Christ
- Saint Agnes Church; 22 Haigh Avenue, Niantic, CT 06357; Roman Catholic
- Niantic Baptist Church; 443 Main Street, Niantic, CT 06357; Baptist
- Saint John's Episcopal Church; 400 Main Street, Niantic, CT 06357; Episcopal
- Christ Presbyterian Church; 443 Main Street, Niantic, CT 06357; Presbyterian Church in America
- Harvest Christian Fellowship; 5 Freedom Way, Niantic, CT 06357; Non-denominational

== Cemeteries ==
=== Active ===
East Lyme Cemetery

- East Lyme Cemetery, Boston Post Road
- Stone Church, intersection of Society and Riverview roads, Niantic
- Union Cemetery, East Pattagansett Road, Niantic

=== Historical ===
There are 16 historical cemeteries in East Lyme currently maintained by the Historic East Lyme Cemetery Association.
