= 2026 Nebraska State Treasurer election =

- November 3, 2026
Nominee	Joey Spellerberg	Daniel Ebers
Party	Republican	Democratic
Popular vote	412,646	297,509
Percentage	58.6%	41.4%
State Treasurer before election
Joey Spellerberg
Republican
Elected State Treasurer
Joey Spellerberg
Republican

The 2026 Nebraska State Treasurer election was held on November 3, 2026, to elect the Nebraska State Treasurer, concurrently with elections to the United States Senate, U.S. House of Representatives, governor, and other state and local elections. Primary elections were held on May 12, 2026.

Republican state treasurer John Murante, who was re-elected in 2022 with 72.2% of the vote, resigned in September 2023 to take a position in the Nebraska Public Employees Retirement System. Governor Jim Pillen appointed state senator Tom Briese as treasurer on September 14, 2023, taking office on November 1. Briese resigned on November 3, 2025, with Pillen then appointing Fremont mayor Joey Spellerberg as treasurer the same day.

== Republican primary ==
=== Candidates ===
==== Nominee ====
- Joey Spellerberg, incumbent state treasurer (2025–present)

==== Withdrawn ====
- Julie Slama, state senator from the 1st district (2019–2025) (endorsed Spellerberg)

=== Endorsements ===
Joey Spellerberg

State senators

- Julie Slama, state senator from the 1st district (2019–2025)

=== Results ===
Republican primary
Party	Candidate	Votes	%
Republican	Joey Spellerberg (incumbent)	156,208	100.0
Total votes		156,208	100.0

== Democratic primary ==
=== Candidates ===
==== Nominee ====
- Daniel Ebers, nominee for Nebraska's 3rd congressional district in 2024

=== Results ===
Democratic primary
Party	Candidate	Votes	%
Democratic	Daniel Ebers	107,214	100.0
Total votes		107,214	100.0

== General election ==
=== Results ===
2026 Nebraska State Treasurer election
Party	Candidate	Votes	%	±%
Republican	Joey Spellerberg (incumbent)			
Democratic	Daniel Ebers			
Total votes			100.0	
