= 2026 United States state treasurer elections =

- November 3, 2026

26 state treasurer offices (Note: Seat tallies and popular vote do not include states that do not elect state treasurers or territorial state treasurers.)
	Majority party	Minority party
Party	Republican	Democratic
Seats before	25	12
Seats after	21	16
Seat change	▼4	▲4
Seats up	16	10
Seats won	12	14
- Democratic hold Democratic gain Republican hold No election

The 2026 United States state treasurer elections were held on November 3, 2026, to elect the state treasurer and equivalents in twenty-six states. The previous elections for this group of states took place in 2022. The treasurer of Vermont serves two-year terms and was last elected in 2024.

These elections were held concurrently with several other federal, state, and local elections.

== Partisan composition ==
Going into the election, there were 26 Republican and 16 Democratic state treasurers and equivalents. This class of treasurers was made of 16 Republicans and 10 Democrats.

Democrats were defending one state won by Donald Trump in 2024 (Nevada), while Republicans did not hold any states won by Kamala Harris.

== Retirements ==
Map of retirements: Republican incumbent ran Democratic incumbent ran Republican incumbent term-limited or lost renomination Democratic incumbent term-limited or retired No election

There were seven incumbent state treasurers (four Democrats and three Republicans) retiring, of which six incumbent state treasurers (three Democrats and three Republicans) were term-limited. The remaining state treasurer (a Democrat) has announced they did not seek reelection.

=== Democratic ===
1. California: Fiona Ma is term-limited after 2 terms.
2. Colorado: Dave Young is term-limited after 2 terms.
3. Delaware: Colleen Davis is retiring.
4. Nevada: Zach Conine is term-limited after 2 terms.

=== Republican ===
1. Arizona: Kimberly Yee is term-limited after 2 terms.
2. Ohio: Robert Sprague is term-limited after 2 terms.
3. South Dakota: Josh Haeder is term-limited after 2 terms.

== Incumbents defeated ==
=== In primary elections ===
==== Republicans ====
One Republican lost renomination.

1. Oklahoma: Todd Russ lost renomination to Cindy Byrd.

== Race summary ==
State	State treasurer	Party	First elected	Last race	Status	Candidates
Alabama	Young Boozer	Republican	2010; 2018 (term-limited); 2021 (appointed)	83.7% R	Incumbent re-elected.	▌ ✓ Young Boozer (Republican); ▌Rosilyn Houston (Democratic)
Arizona	Kimberly Yee	Republican	2018	55.7% R	Incumbent term-limited. Democratic gain.	▌ ✓ Nick Mansour (Democratic); ▌Elijah Norton (Republican)
Arkansas	John Thurston	Republican	2024 (special)	65.4% R	Incumbent re-elected.	▌ ✓ John Thurston (Republican)
California	Fiona Ma	Democratic	2018	58.8% D	Incumbent term-limited. Democratic hold.	▌ ✓ Eleni Kounalakis (Democratic); ▌Jennifer Hawks (Republican)
Colorado	Dave Young	Democratic	2018	53.7% D	Incumbent term-limited. Democratic hold.	▌ ✓ Jeff Bridges (Democratic); ▌Kevin Grantham (Republican); ▌Jodie Barr (Libertarian); ▌Marilee Langner Sturgis (Approval Voting)
Connecticut	Erick Russell	Democratic	2022	52.4% D	Incumbent re-elected.	▌ ✓ Erick Russell (Democratic); ▌Fred Wilms (Republican)
Delaware	Colleen Davis	Democratic	2018	53.6% D	Incumbent retired. Democratic hold.	▌ ✓ Ted Lauzen (Democratic); ▌Mike Ramone (Republican)
Florida	Blaise Ingoglia	Republican	2025 (appointed) (Note: Previous incumbent Jimmy Patronis took office after his predecessor (Jeff Atwater) resigned. He was subsequently elected in the 2018 Florida Chief Financial Officer election and resigned on March 31, 2025, to run for Congress in a special election. Governor Ron DeSantis then appointed Ingoglia to the position.)	Appointed (Note: Ingoglia's predecessor Patronis was re-elected with 62.0% of the vote in 2022.)	Interim appointee elected.	▌ ✓ Blaise Ingoglia (Republican); ▌Annette Taddeo (Democratic)
Idaho	Julie Ellsworth	Republican	2018	71.1% R	Incumbent re-elected.	▌ ✓ Julie Ellsworth (Republican); ▌Kevin Jones (Democratic)
Illinois	Mike Frerichs	Democratic	2014	54.3% D	Incumbent re-elected.	▌ ✓ Mike Frerichs (Democratic); ▌Max Solomon (Republican)
Indiana	Daniel Elliott	Republican	2022	60.9% R	Incumbent re-elected.	▌ ✓ Daniel Elliott (Republican); ▌Coumba Kebe (Democratic)
Iowa	Roby Smith	Republican	2022	51.3% R	Incumbent re-elected.	▌ ✓ Roby Smith (Republican); ▌John Norwood (Democratic)
Kansas	Steven Johnson	Republican	2022	54.0% R	Incumbent re-elected.	▌ ✓ Steven Johnson (Republican); ▌Juan Luengo (Democratic); ▌Eric Lund (Libertarian)
Massachusetts	Deb Goldberg	Democratic	2014	76.5% D	Incumbent re-elected.	▌ ✓ Deb Goldberg (Democratic); ▌Elizabeth Dionne (Republican)
Nebraska	Joey Spellerberg	Republican	2025 (appointed)	Appointed (Note: Spellerberg was appointed after the resignation of Tom Briese, who himself was appointed after the resignation of John Murante, who was re-elected with 56.4% of the vote in 2022.)	Interim appointee elected.	▌ ✓ Joey Spellerberg (Republican); ▌Daniel Ebers (Democratic)
Nevada	Zach Conine	Democratic	2018	47.7% D	Incumbent term-limited. Democratic hold.	▌ ✓ Tya Mathis-Coleman (Democratic); ▌Drew Johnson (Republican)
New Mexico	Laura Montoya	Democratic	2022	53.2% D	Incumbent re-elected.	▌ ✓ Laura Montoya (Democratic); ▌Jim Ellison (Republican)
Ohio	Robert Sprague	Republican	2018	58.6% R	Incumbent term-limited. Democratic gain.	▌ ✓ Seth Walsh (Democratic); ▌Jay Edwards (Republican)
Oklahoma	Todd Russ	Republican	2022	64.8% R	Incumbent lost renomination. Republican hold.	▌ ✓ Cindy Byrd (Republican); ▌Kiefer Perry (Libertarian)
Rhode Island	James Diossa	Democratic	2022	54.3% D	Incumbent re-elected.	▌ ✓ James Diossa (Democratic); ▌Micholas Credle (Republican)
South Carolina	Curtis Loftis	Republican	2010	79.7% R	Incumbent re-elected.	▌ ✓ Curtis Loftis (Republican); ▌Vincent Coe (Democratic)
South Dakota	Josh Haeder	Republican	2018	67.0% R	Incumbent term-limited. Republican hold.	▌ ✓ Melissa Hull (Republican); ▌Margaret Kuipers (Democratic)
Texas	Don Huffines (Note: Due to stipulations in Texas law, Huffines cannot be formally appointed to the position and will serve as the state's acting Comptroller until 2027.)	Republican	2026 (appointed)	Appointed (Note: Appointee's predecessor Hancock held the office as an appointee for a year and was preceded by Hegar who was re-elected with 56.4% of the vote in 2022.)	Interim appointee lost election. Democratic gain.	▌ ✓ Sarah Eckhardt (Democratic); ▌Don Huffines (Republican); ▌Alonzo Echavarria-Garza (Libertarian); ▌Shehla Faizi (Green)
Vermont	Mike Pieciak	Democratic	2022	56.6% D	Incumbent re-elected.	▌ ✓ Mike Pieciak (Democratic); ▌Lynn LaFleur (Republican); ▌Zachary Hampl (Progressive)
Wisconsin	John Leiber	Republican	2022	49.6% R	Incumbent lost re-election. Democratic gain.	▌ ✓ Yee Leng Xiong (Democratic); ▌John Leiber (Republican)
Wyoming	Curt Meier	Republican	2018	100% R (Note: Meier ran unopposed.)	Incumbent re-elected.	▌ ✓ Curt Meier (Republican)

== Alabama ==
Alabama State Treasurer election
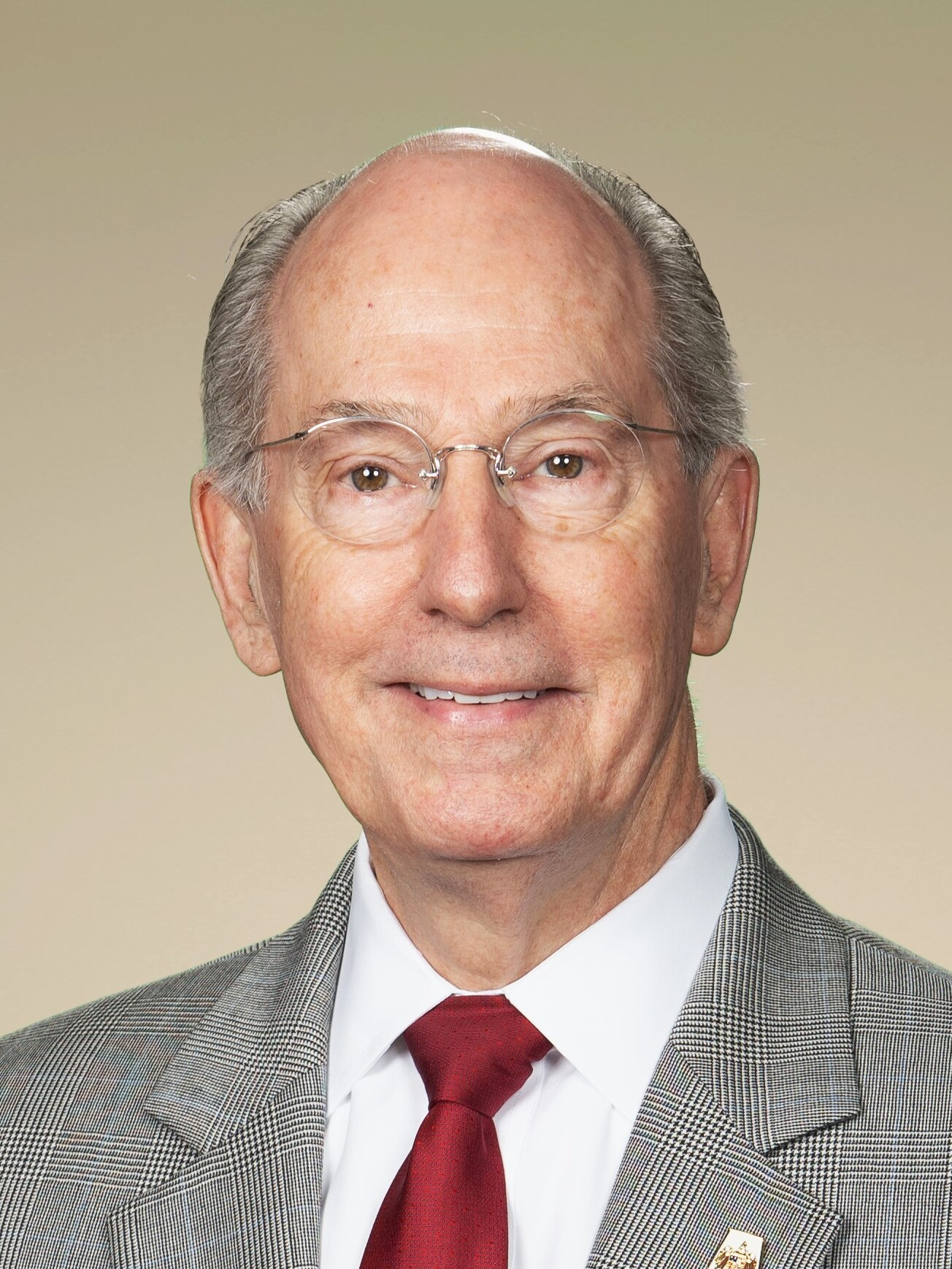

Candidate	Young Boozer	Rosilyn Houston
Party	Republican	Democratic
Incumbent Treasurer
Young Boozer
Republican

State Treasurer Young Boozer was elected in 2022 with 83.7% of the vote, without major party opposition. He is running for re-election.

== Arizona ==
Arizona State Treasurer election
Nominee	Elijah Norton	Nick Mansour
Party	Republican	Democratic
Incumbent State Treasurer
Kimberly Yee
Republican

State Treasurer Kimberly Yee was re-elected in 2022 with 55.7% of the vote. She is term-limited and cannot seek re-election. Businessman Elijah Norton ran in the Republican primary for the position. Businessman Nick Mansour ran in the Democratic primary for the position. Mansour defeated Norton in the November general election.

== Arkansas ==
Arkansas State Treasurer election
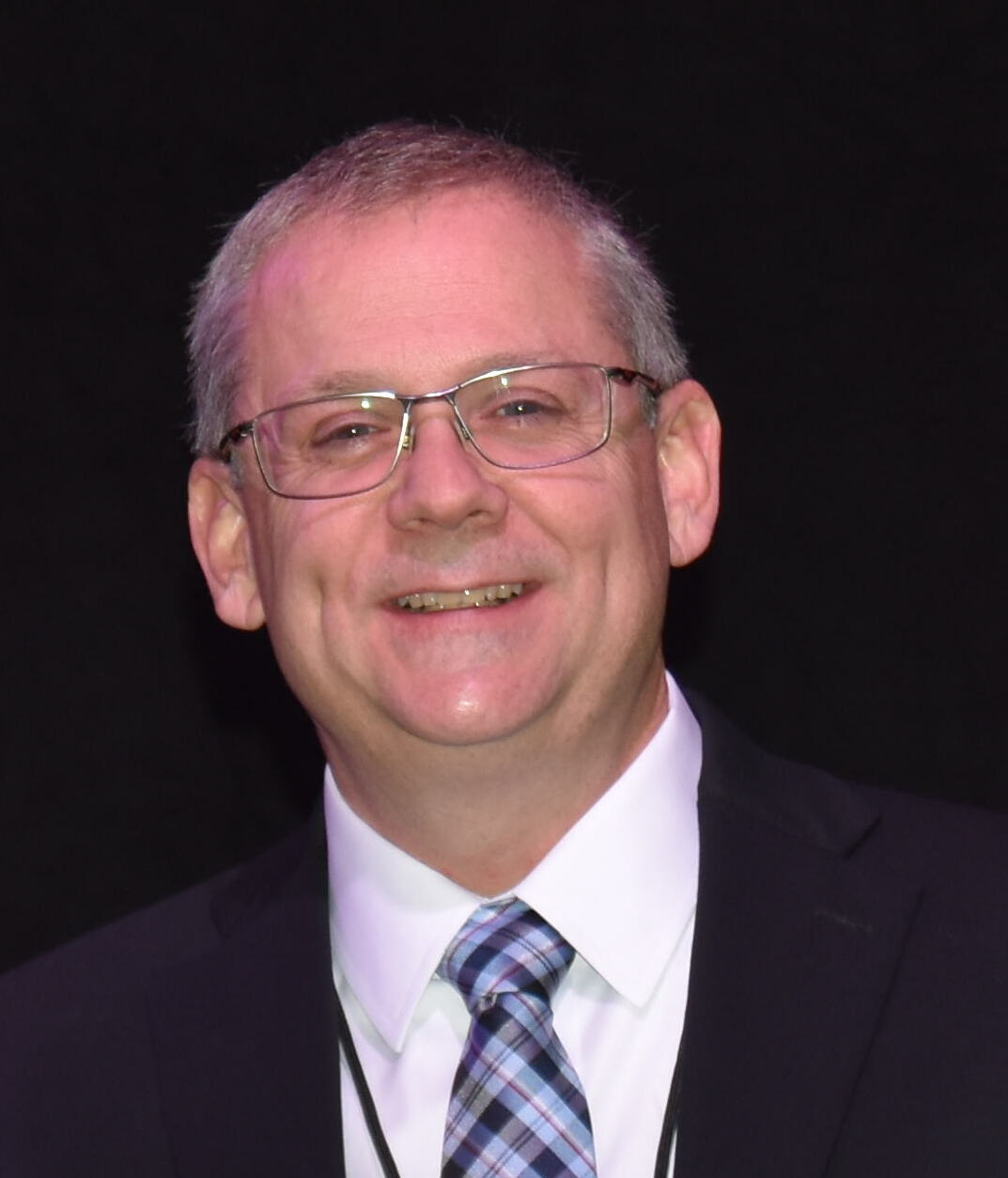
Nominee	John Thurston
Party	Republican
Incumbent State Treasurer
John Thurston
Republican

State Treasurer John Thurston was elected in the 2024 special election with 65.4% of the vote. He is running for election to a full term.

== California ==
California State Treasurer election
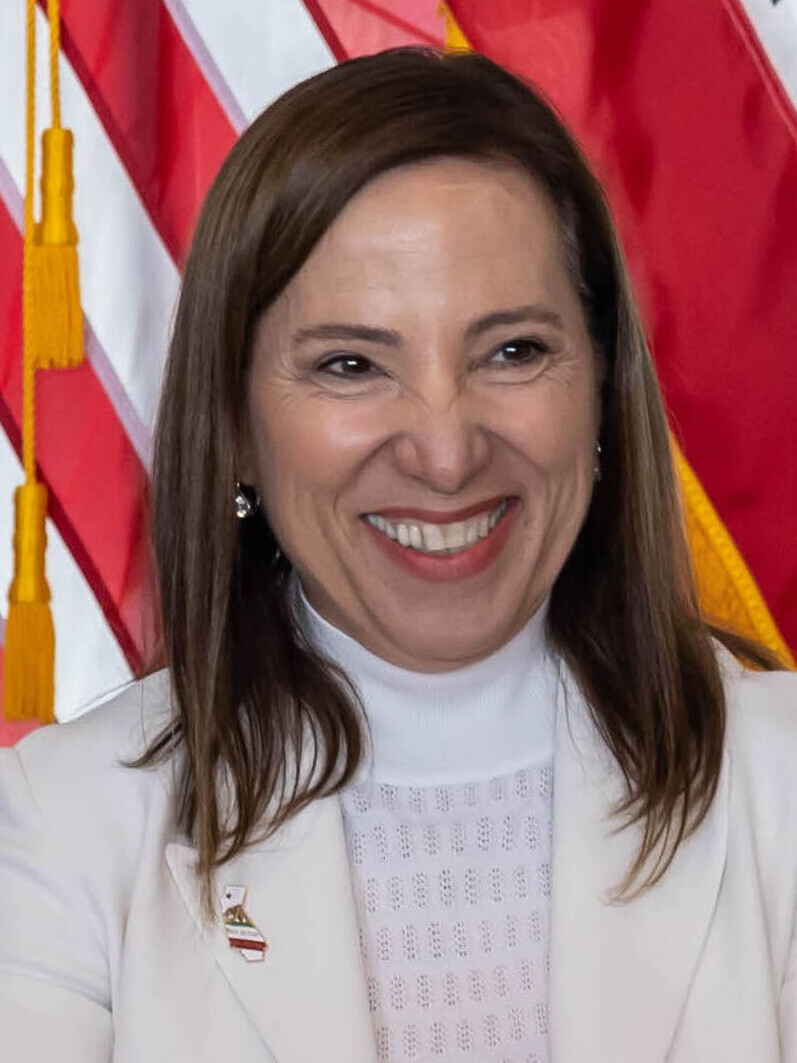

Candidate	Eleni Kounalakis	Jennifer Hawks
Party	Democratic	Republican
Incumbent State Treasurer
Fiona Ma
Democratic

State Treasurer Fiona Ma was re-elected in 2022 with 58.8% of the vote. She is term-limited and cannot seek re-election. Lieutenant Governor Eleni Kounalakis and former businesswoman Jennifer Hawks are running to succeed her.

== Colorado ==
Colorado State Treasurer election
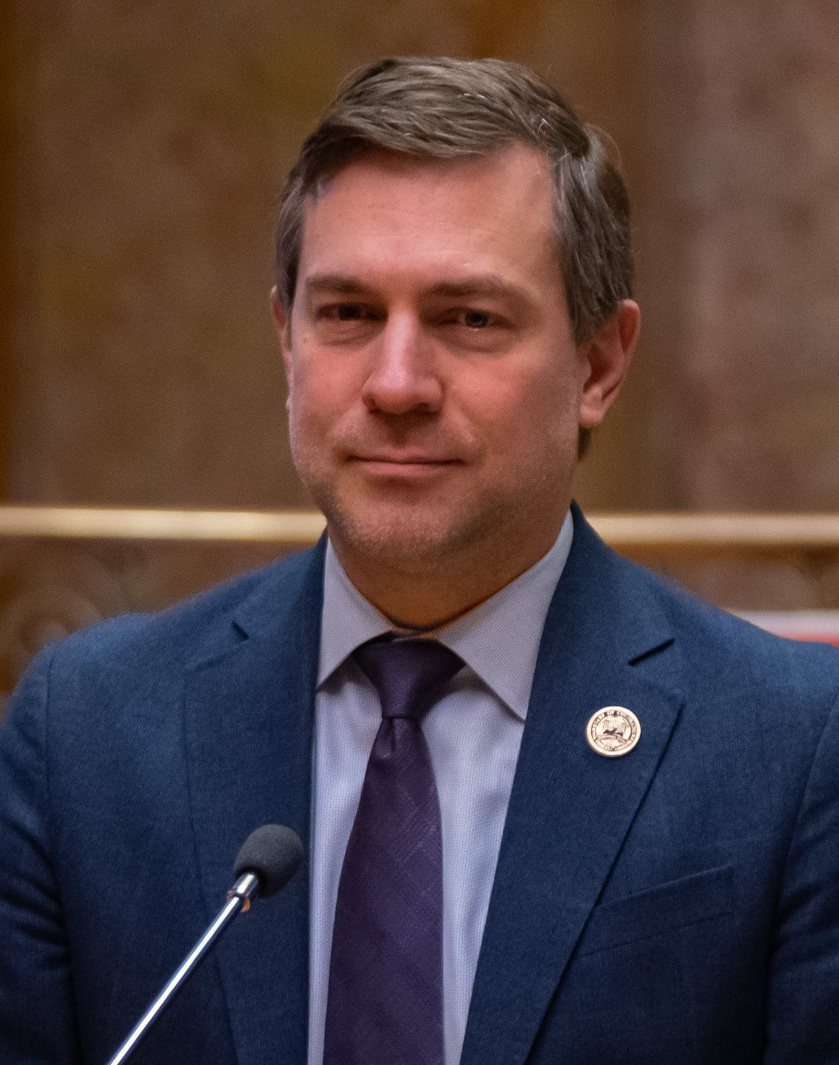

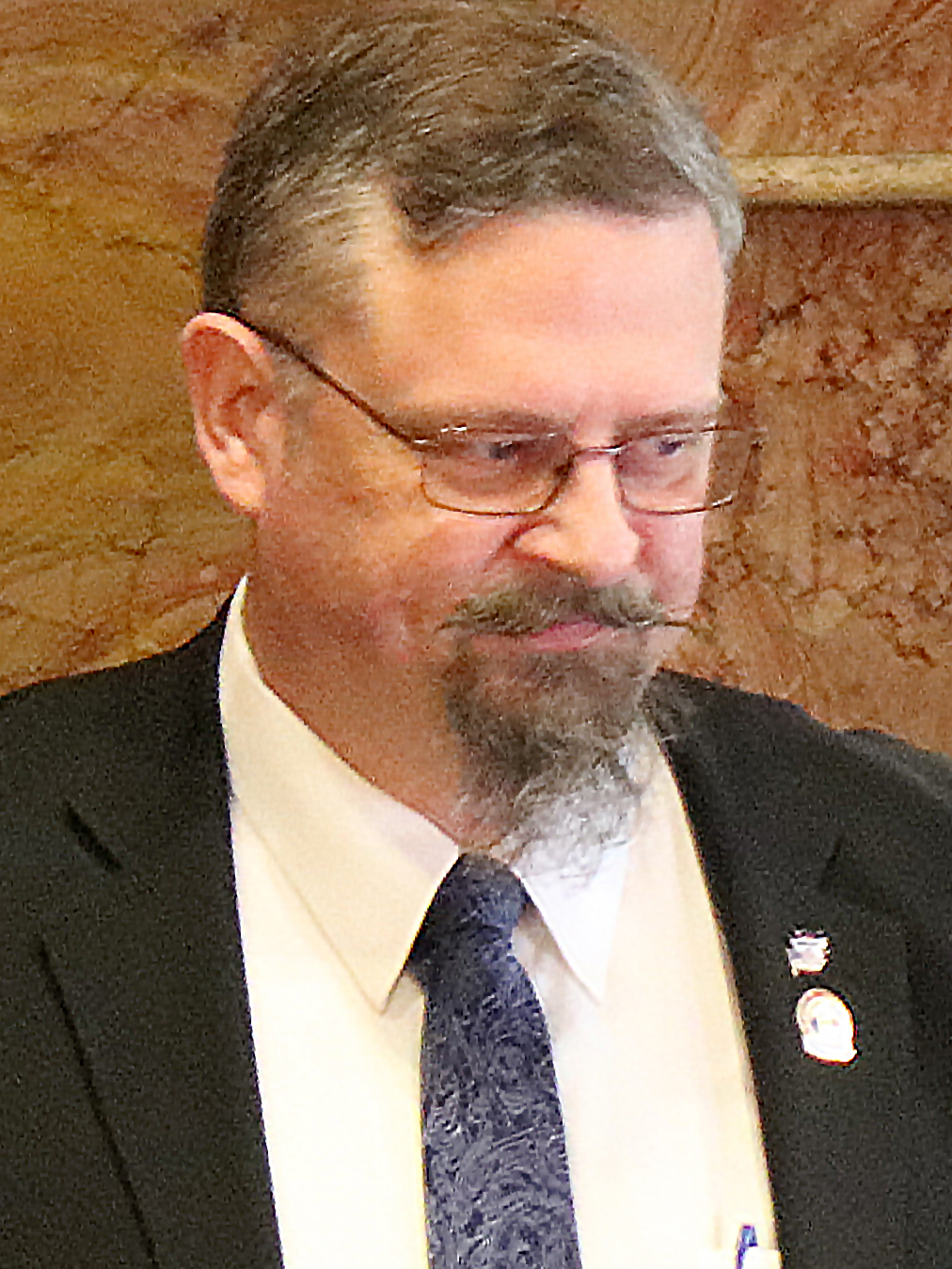
Nominee	Jeff Bridges	Kevin Grantham
Party	Democratic	Republican
Incumbent State Treasurer
Dave Young
Democratic

State Treasurer Dave Young was re-elected in 2022 with 53.7% of the vote. He is term-limited and cannot seek re-election.

Colorado State Representative Brianna Titone announced on February 26, 2025, that she would run in the Democratic Primary. Also announced in the Democratic Primary are state senator Jeff Bridges, and former chair of the El Paso County Democratic Party John Mikos.

Jefferson County Treasurer Jerry DiTullio withdrew from the race on March 23, 2026, endorsing Jeff Bridges.

During the Colorado Democratic Party state assembly on March 28, 2026, candidates had to achieve 30% or more in support in order to move forward to the Primary ballot in June. The results came out with 1,449 people voting, 633 (43.69%) supported Jeff Bridges, 422 (29.12%) supported Brianna Titone, and 394 (27.19%) supported John Mikos. Titone and Mikos did not achieve the 30% and thus were disqualified from moving forward. With no candidates petitioning onto the Primary ballot and Bridges being the only candidate to move forward, Bridges will take the Democratic Nomination.

Fremont County commissioner Kevin Grantham was the only candidate running for the Republican nomination. Because no one else ran, Grantham is the Republican nominee for Colorado State Treasurer.

== Connecticut ==
Connecticut State Treasurer election
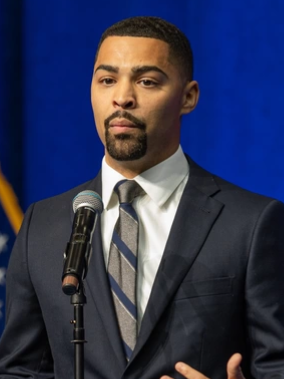

Nominee	Erick Russell	Fred Wilms
Party	Democratic	Republican
Incumbent State Treasurer
Erick Russell
Democratic

State Treasurer Erick Russell was elected in 2022 with 52.4% of the vote. He is running for re-election.

Banker and former state representative Fred Wilms of Norwalk announced his candidacy for the Republican nomination on July 18, 2025.

== Delaware ==
Delaware State Treasurer election
Nominee	Ted Lauzen	Mike Ramone
Party	Democratic	Republican
Incumbent State Treasurer
Colleen Davis
Democratic

State Treasurer Colleen Davis was re-elected in 2022 with 53.6% of the vote. On December 4, 2025, she announced that she would not seek re-election to a third term.

== Florida ==
Florida Chief Financial Officer election
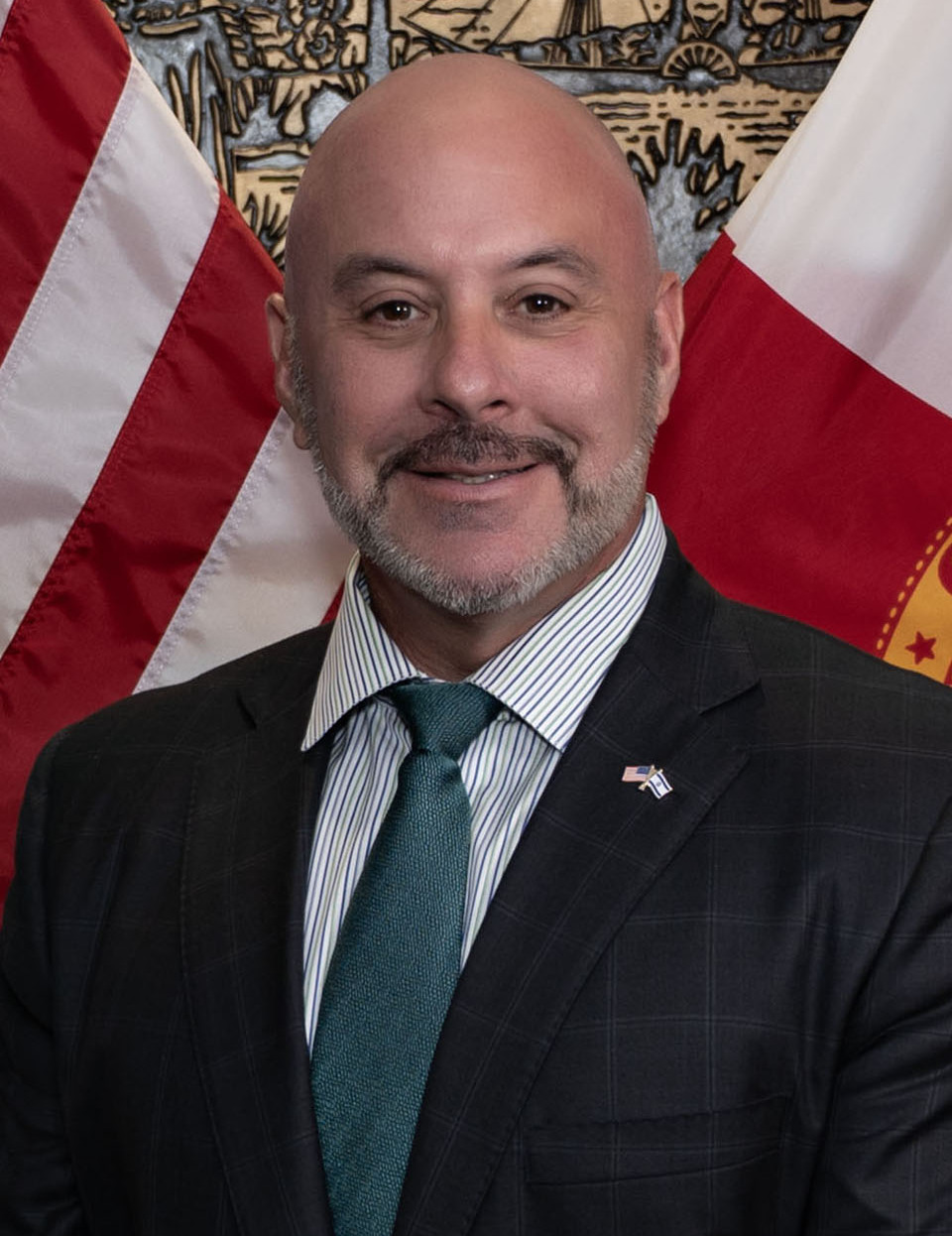

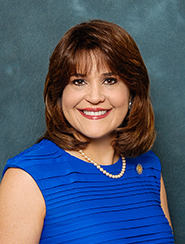
Nominee	Blaise Ingoglia	Annette Taddeo
Party	Republican	Democratic
Incumbent Chief Financial Officer
Blaise Ingoglia
Republican

Chief Financial Officer Jimmy Patronis was re-elected in 2022 with 59.5% of the vote. He was term-limited and could not seek re-election when on November 25, 2024, Patronis announced his resignation as CFO effective March 31, 2025, to run in a special election for Florida's 1st congressional district that Matt Gaetz represented prior to his November 2024 resignation. On July 21, 2025, Governor Ron DeSantis appointed state senator Blaise Ingoglia to the position. Ingoglia is running for election to a full term.

== Idaho ==
Idaho State Treasurer election
Nominee	Julie Ellsworth	Kevin Jones
Party	Republican	Democratic
Incumbent State Treasurer
Julie Ellsworth
Republican

State Treasurer Julie Ellsworth was elected in 2022 with 71.1% of the vote. She is running for re-election for a third term.

== Illinois ==
Illinois State Treasurer election
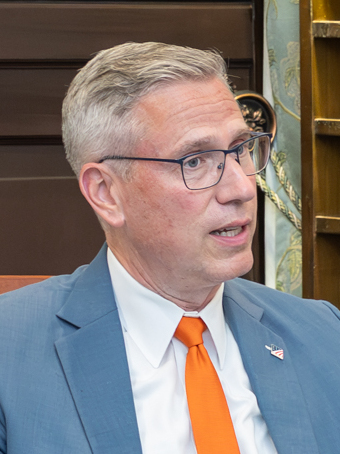

Candidate	Mike Frerichs	Max Solomon
Party	Democratic	Republican
Incumbent Treasurer
Mike Frerichs
Democratic

State Treasurer Mike Frerichs was elected in 2022 with 54.3% of the vote. He is running for re-election for a fourth term.

== Indiana ==
Indiana State Treasurer election
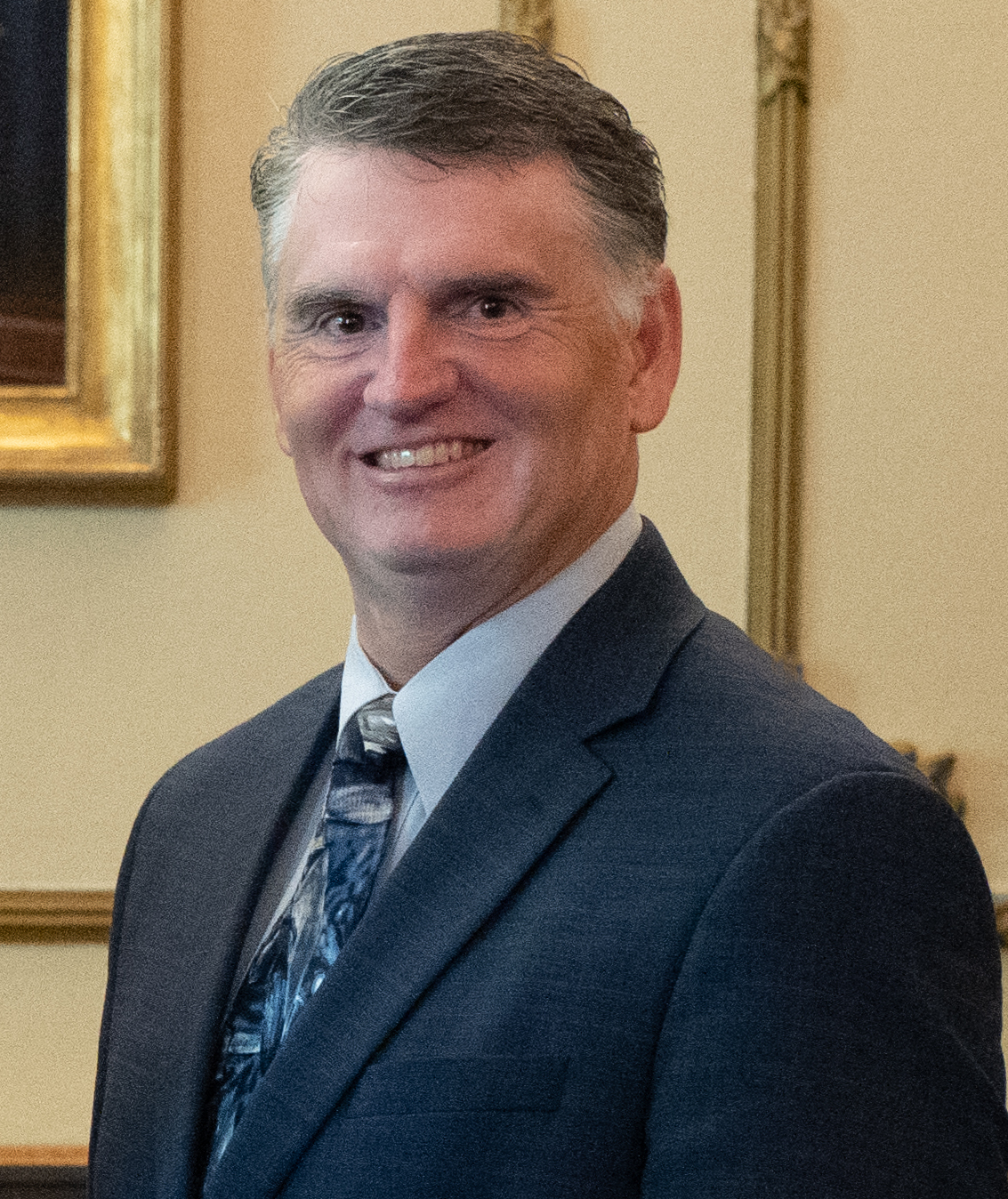

Candidate	Daniel Elliott	Coumba Kebe
Party	Republican	Democratic
Incumbent State Treasurer
Daniel Elliott
Republican

State Treasurer Daniel Elliott was elected in 2022 with 60.9% of the vote. He is running for re-election to a second term. He is being opposed by Democrat Coumba Kebe.

== Iowa ==
Iowa State Treasurer election
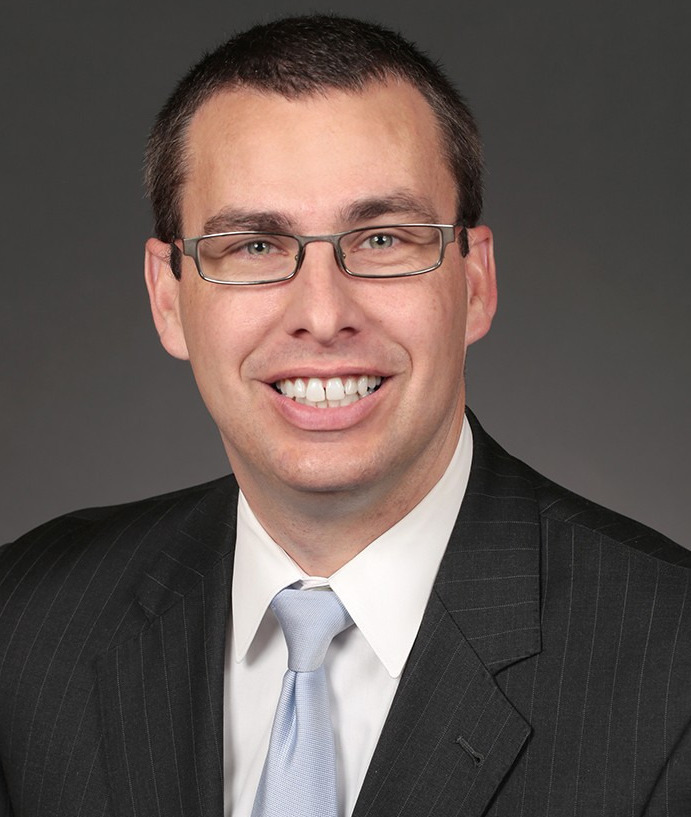

Nominee	Roby Smith	John Norwood
Party	Republican	Democratic
Incumbent State Treasurer
Roby Smith
Republican

State Treasurer Roby Smith was elected in 2022 with 51.3% of the vote. He is running for re-election.

John Norwood is running as a Democrat.

== Kansas ==
Kansas State Treasurer election
Nominee	Steven Johnson	Juan Luengo
Party	Republican	Democratic
Incumbent State Treasurer
Steven Johnson
Republican

State Treasurer Steven Johnson was elected in 2022 with 54% of the vote. He is running for re-election to a second term.

== Massachusetts ==
Massachusetts Treasurer and Receiver-General election
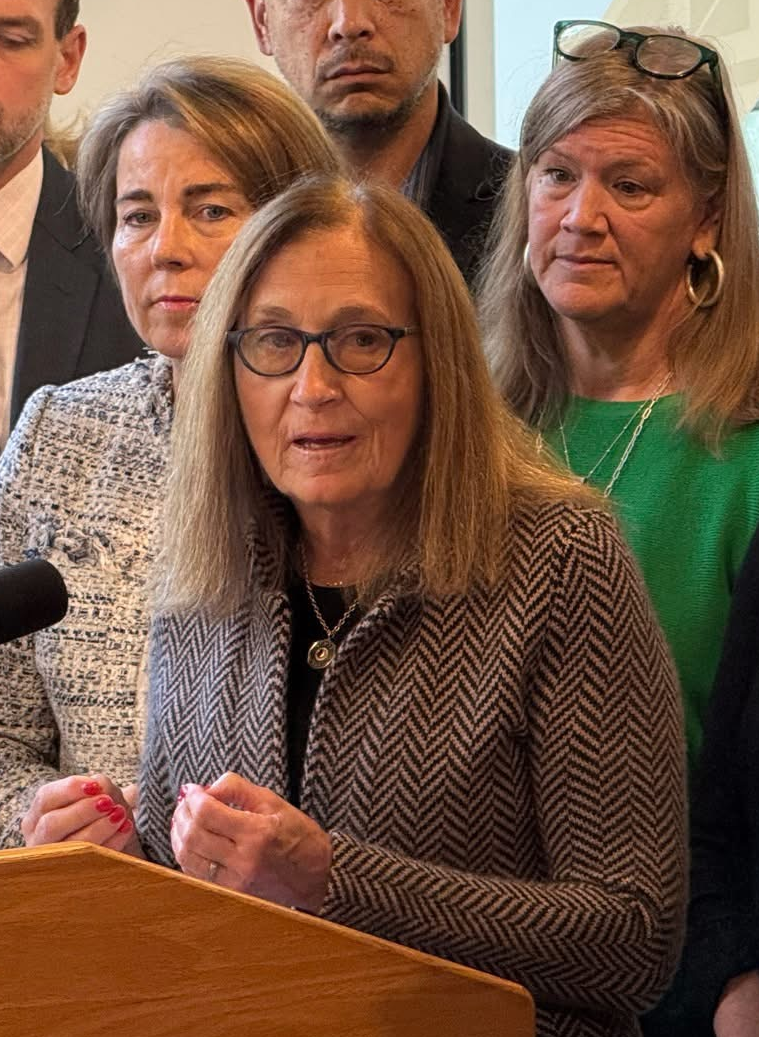

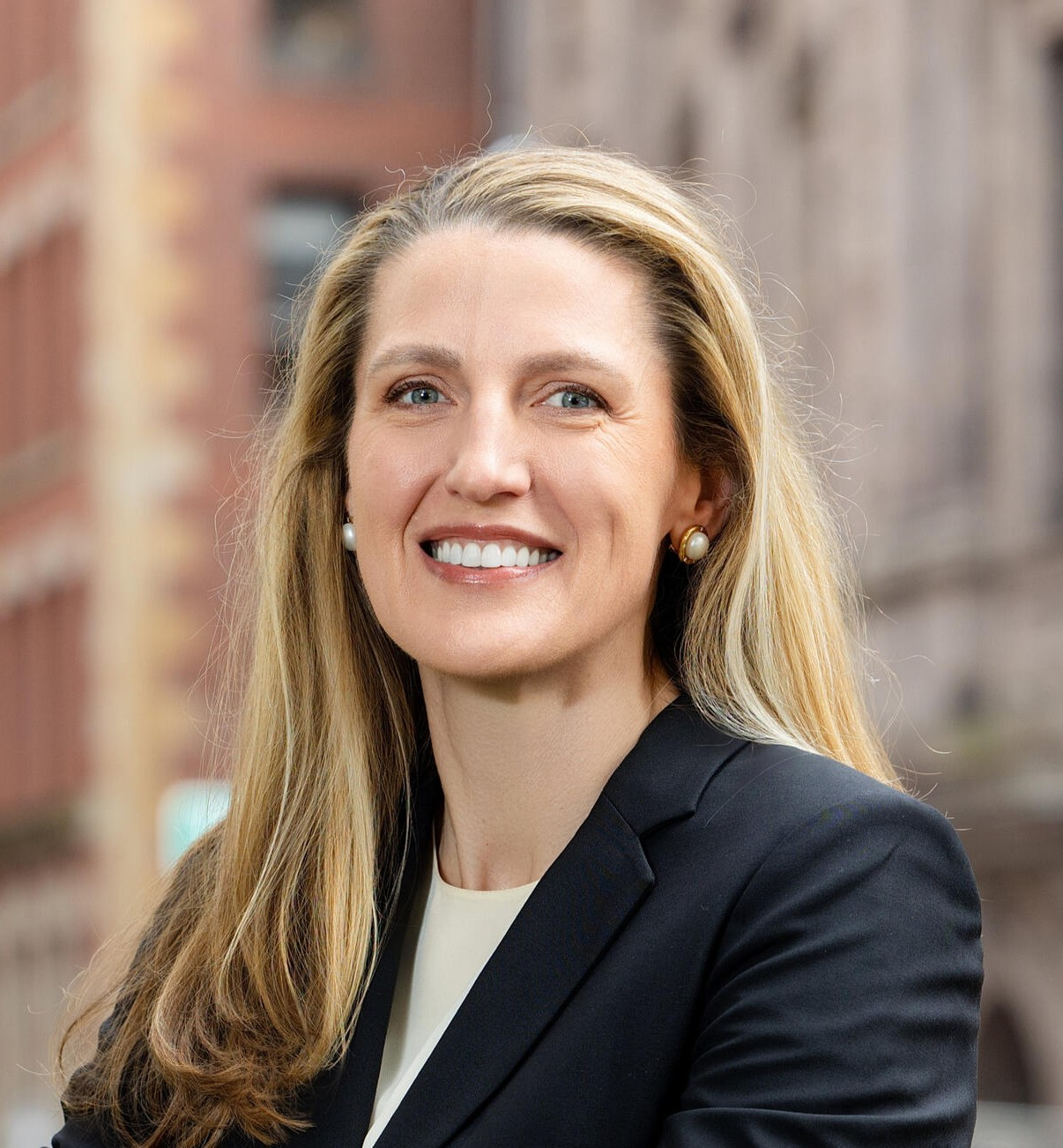
Nominee	Deb Goldberg	Elizabeth Dionne
Party	Democratic	Republican
Incumbent Treasurer and Receiver-General
Deb Goldberg
Democratic

Treasurer and Receiver-General Deb Goldberg was re-elected in 2022 with 76.5% of the vote. She is running for re-election.

Belmont select board member Elizabeth Dionne is running as a Republican.

== Nebraska ==
Nebraska State Treasurer election
Nominee	Joey Spellerberg	Daniel Ebers
Party	Republican	Democratic
Incumbent State Treasurer
Joey Spellerberg
Republican

State Treasurer Joey Spellerberg was appointed after the resignation of Tom Briese, who himself was appointed after the resignation of John Murante, who was re-elected in 2022 with 72.2% of the vote. He is running for election to a full term.

== Nevada ==
Nevada State Treasurer election

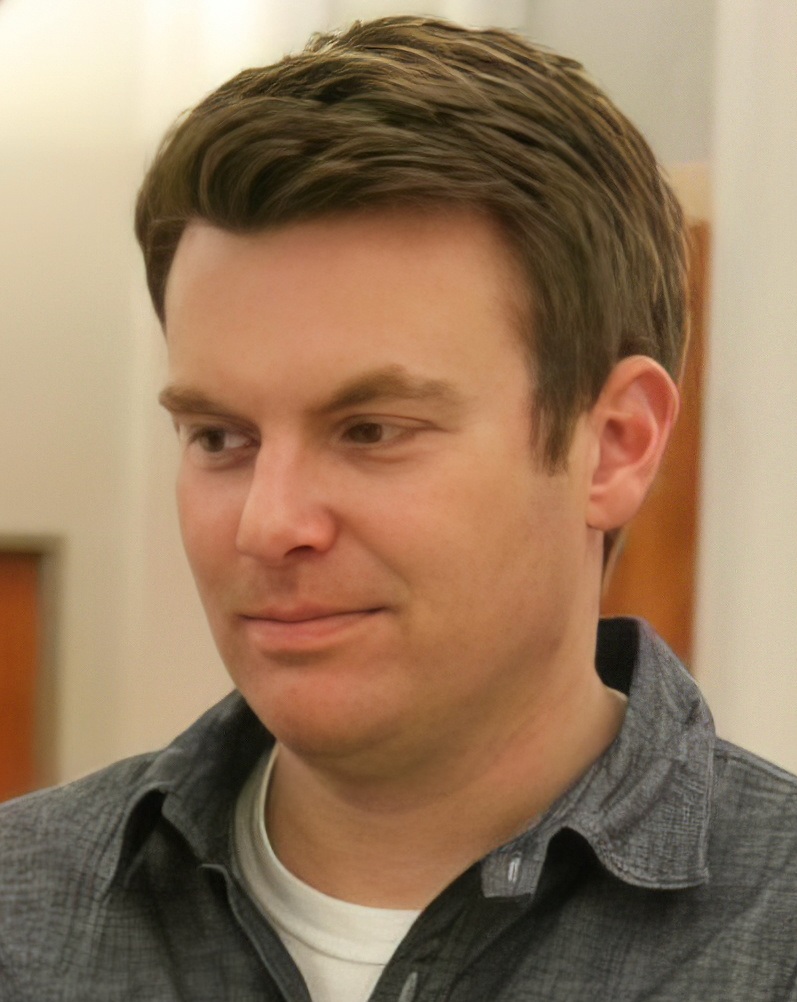
Nominee	Tya Mathis-Coleman	Drew Johnson
Party	Democratic	Republican
Incumbent State Treasurer
Zach Conine
Democratic

State Treasurer Zach Conine was re-elected in 2022 with 47.7% of the vote. He is term-limited and cannot seek re-election.

== New Mexico ==
New Mexico State Treasurer election
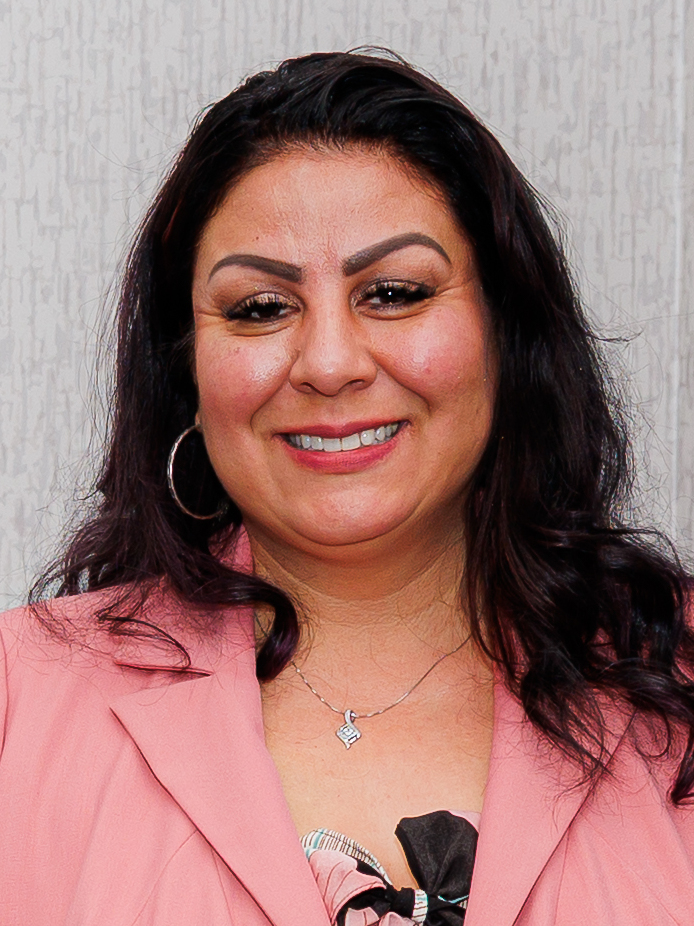

Nominee	Laura Montoya	Jim Ellison
Party	Democratic	Republican
Incumbent State Treasurer
Laura Montoya
Democratic

State Treasurer Laura Montoya was elected in 2022 with 53.2% of the vote. She is running for re-election. Former New Mexico Public Regulation Commissioner Jim Ellison is running in the Republican primary as a write-in candidate.

== Ohio ==
Ohio State Treasurer election

Nominee	Jay Edwards	Seth Walsh
Party	Republican	Democratic
Incumbent State Treasurer
Robert Sprague
Republican

State Treasurer Robert Sprague was re-elected in 2022 with 58.6% of the vote. He is term-limited and cannot seek re-election. Former state senator Niraj Antani Republican, former state representative Jay Edwards, state senator Kristina Roegner, and Lake County treasurer Michael Zuren are running for the Republican nomination.

== Oklahoma ==
Oklahoma State Treasurer election
Nominee	Cindy Byrd	Kiefer Perry
Party	Republican	Libertarian
Incumbent State Treasurer
Todd Russ
Republican

State Treasurer Todd Russ was elected in 2022 with 64.8% of the vote. He ran for re-election but lost renomination to his challenger Cindy Byrd.

== Rhode Island ==
Rhode Island General Treasurer election
- November 3, 2026
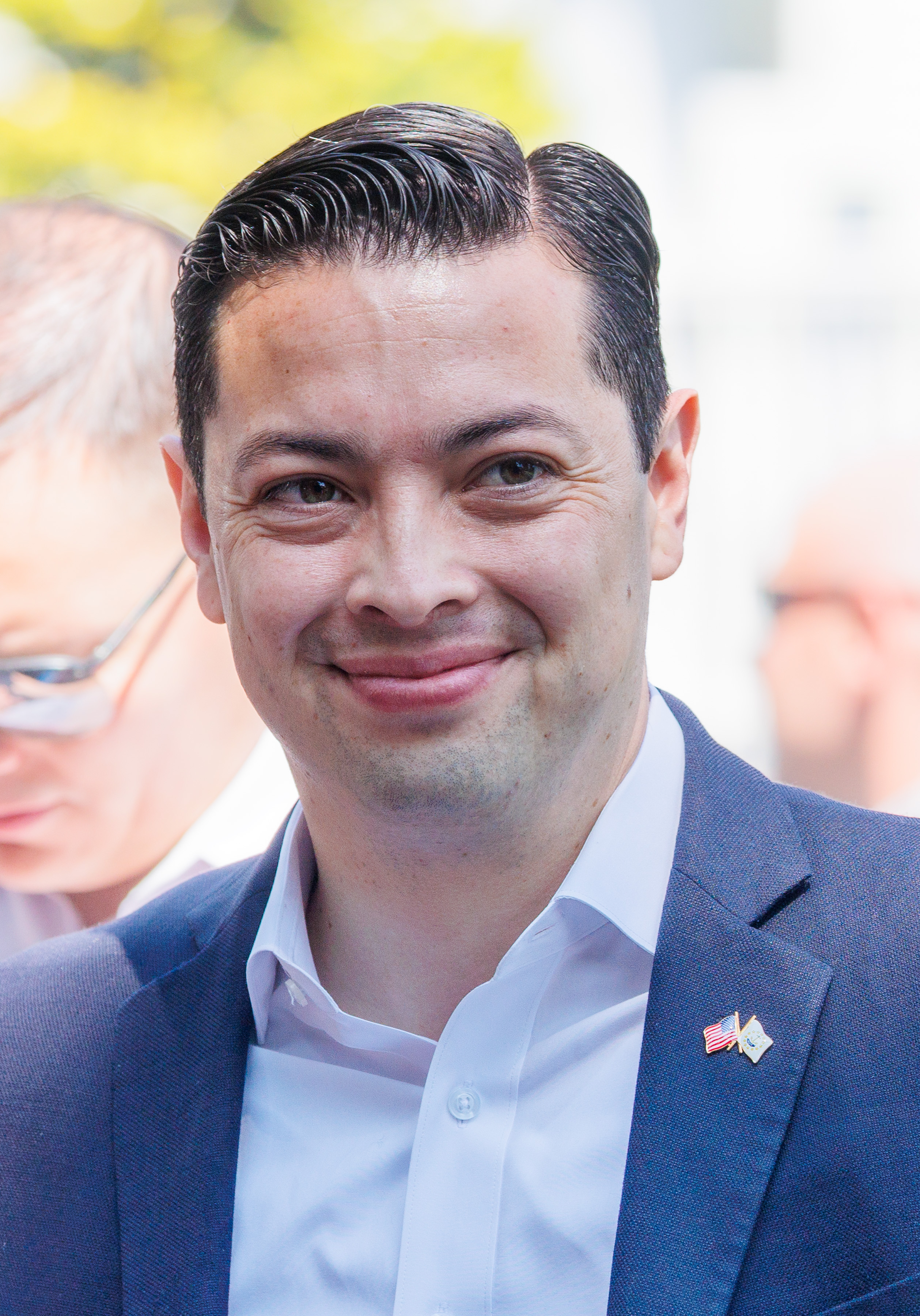

Nominee	James Diossa	Micholas Credle
Party	Democratic	Republican
Incumbent General Treasurer
James Diossa
Democratic

General Treasurer James Diossa was elected in 2022 with 54.3% of the vote. He is running for re-election. He faces off against Republican Micholas Credle.

== South Carolina ==
South Carolina State Treasurer election
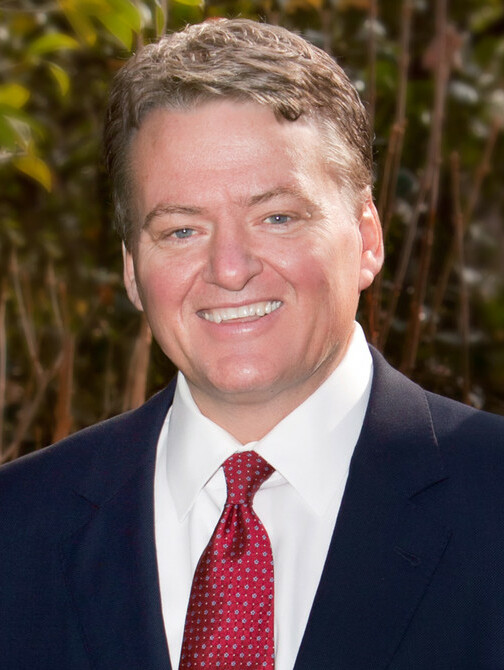

Nominee	Curtis Loftis	Vincent Coe
Party	Republican	Democratic
Incumbent State Treasurer
Curtis Loftis
Republican

State Treasurer and Republican incumbent Curtis Loftis was re-elected in 2022 with 79.7% of the vote. He said that he would not run for re-election in April 2024, but announced in April 2025 that he would run for another term in 2026. Democrats Vincent Coe and Bruce Cole faced off in a primary. Loftis defeated Coe in the general election.

== South Dakota ==
South Dakota State Treasurer election
Candidate	Melissa Hull	Margaret Kuipers
Party	Republican	Democratic
Incumbent State Treasurer
Josh Haeder
Republican

State Treasurer Josh Haeder was re-elected in 2022 with 67% of the vote. He is term-limited and cannot seek re-election. Former state legislator Jeff Monroe has announced his candidacy. Republican Melissa Hull won the Republican nomination while Margaret Kuipers won the Democratic nomination.

== Texas ==
Texas Comptroller of Public Accounts election

Nominee	Don Huffines	Sarah Eckhardt
Party	Republican	Democratic
Incumbent Comptroller
Don Huffines
Republican

Texas Comptroller of Public Accounts Glenn Hegar (the office serves as the state treasurer) was re-elected in 2022 with 56.4% of the vote. On March 7, 2025, Hegar was selected by the Texas A&M University System as the lone finalist for Chancellor. Hegar left office on July 1, 2025, with Governor Greg Abbott appointing Kelly Hancock as his replacement to serve the remainder of his term. Hancock is running to hold the position, as well as Christi Craddick and Don Huffines.

== Vermont ==
Vermont State Treasurer election
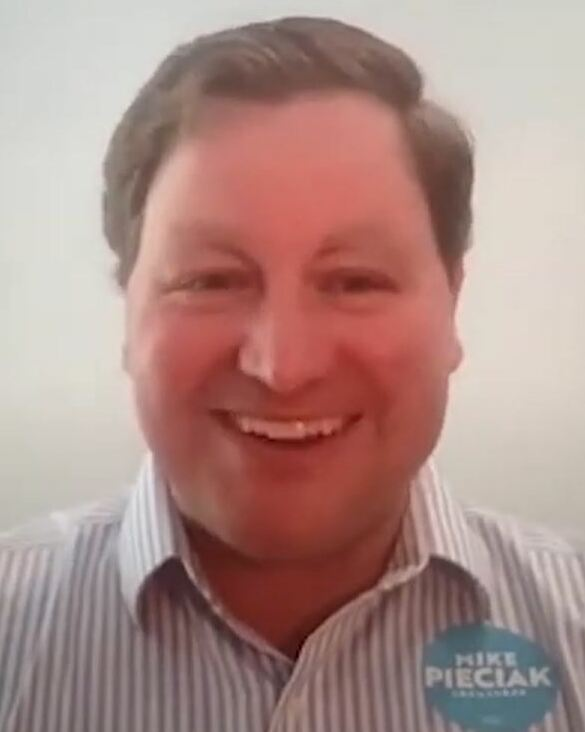

Nominee	Mike Pieciak	Lynn LaFleur
Party	Democratic	Republican
Incumbent State Treasurer
Mike Pieciak
Democratic

State Treasurer Mike Pieciak was re-elected in 2024 with 60.8% of the vote. He is seeking re-election. He was mentioned as a potential candidate for Governor, but decided to seek re-election instead. Republican Lynn LaFleur is challenging him.

== Wisconsin ==
Wisconsin State Treasurer election
Nominee	John Leiber	Yee Xiong
Party	Republican	Democratic
Incumbent Treasurer
John Leiber
Republican

State Treasurer John Leiber was elected in 2022 with 49.6% of the vote. He is running for re-election to a second term in office. Democratic challengers include Black Earth village trustee Dylan Helmenstine, member of the Marathon County board of supervisors Yee Leng Xiong, and businessman Eric Wilson. Orlando Owens, who ran for the seat as a Republican in 2022, has filed to run for the seat again.

== Wyoming ==
Wyoming State Treasurer election
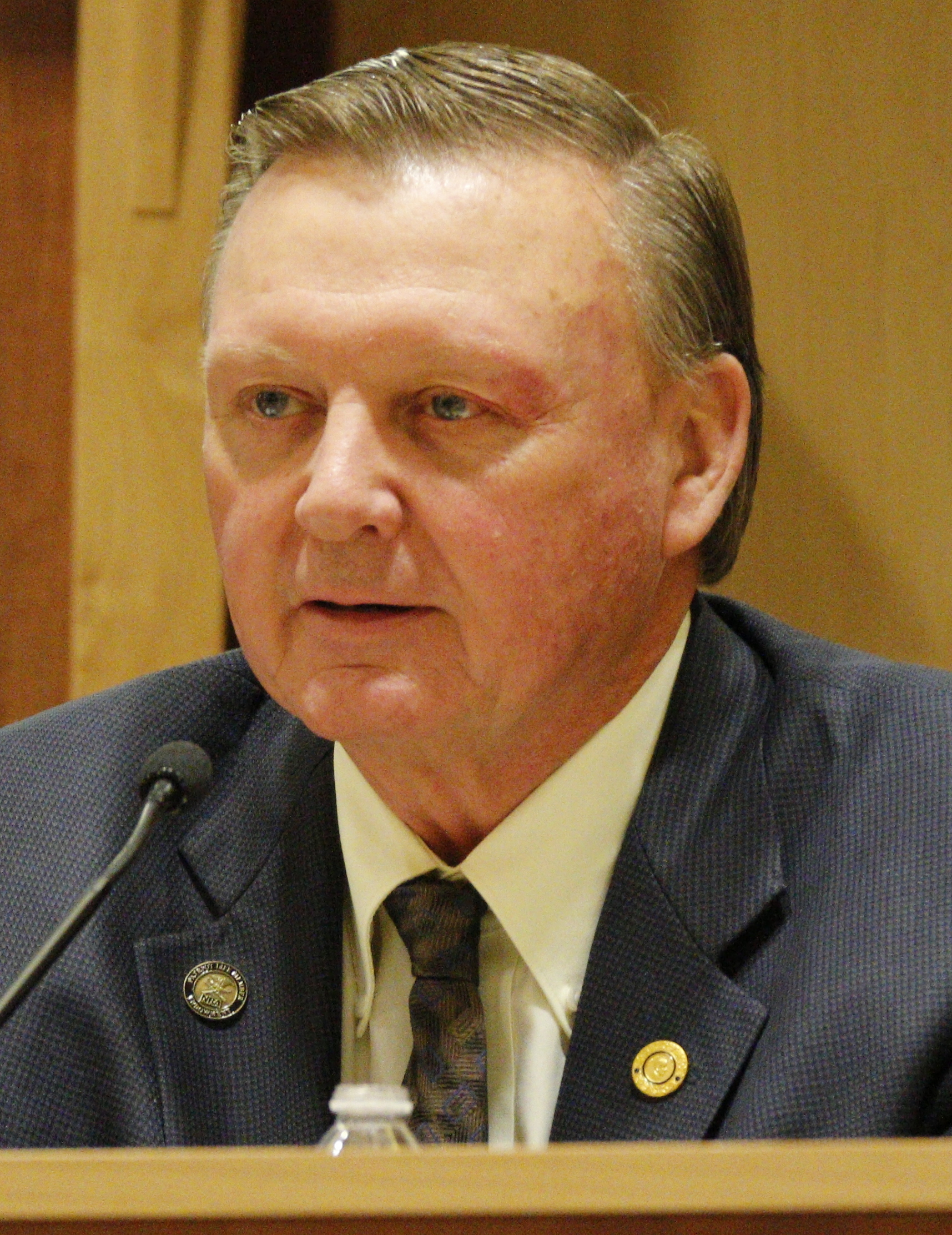
Nominee	Curt Meier
Party	Republican
State Treasurer before election
Curt Meier
Republican
Elected State Treasurer
Curt Meier
Republican

State Treasurer Curt Meier was re-elected unopposed in 2022. He is running for re-election to a third term.

== See also ==
- 2026 United States elections
