= Government of Nebraska =

Government Entity cover page

- Logo of the Nebraskan government Great Seal of the State of Nebraska
- Part of: United States of America
- Constitution: Constitution of Nebraska

The Government of the U.S. State of Nebraska, established by the Nebraska Constitution, is a republican democracy modeled after the Federal Government of the United States. The state government has three branches: the executive, the legislative, and the judicial. Through a system of separation of powers, or "checks and balances," each of these branches has some authority to act on its own, and also some authority to regulate the other two branches, so that all three branches can limit and balance the others' authority. The State Government is based in Lincoln, the capital city of Nebraska.

== Executive Branch ==
The statewide elected officers are:

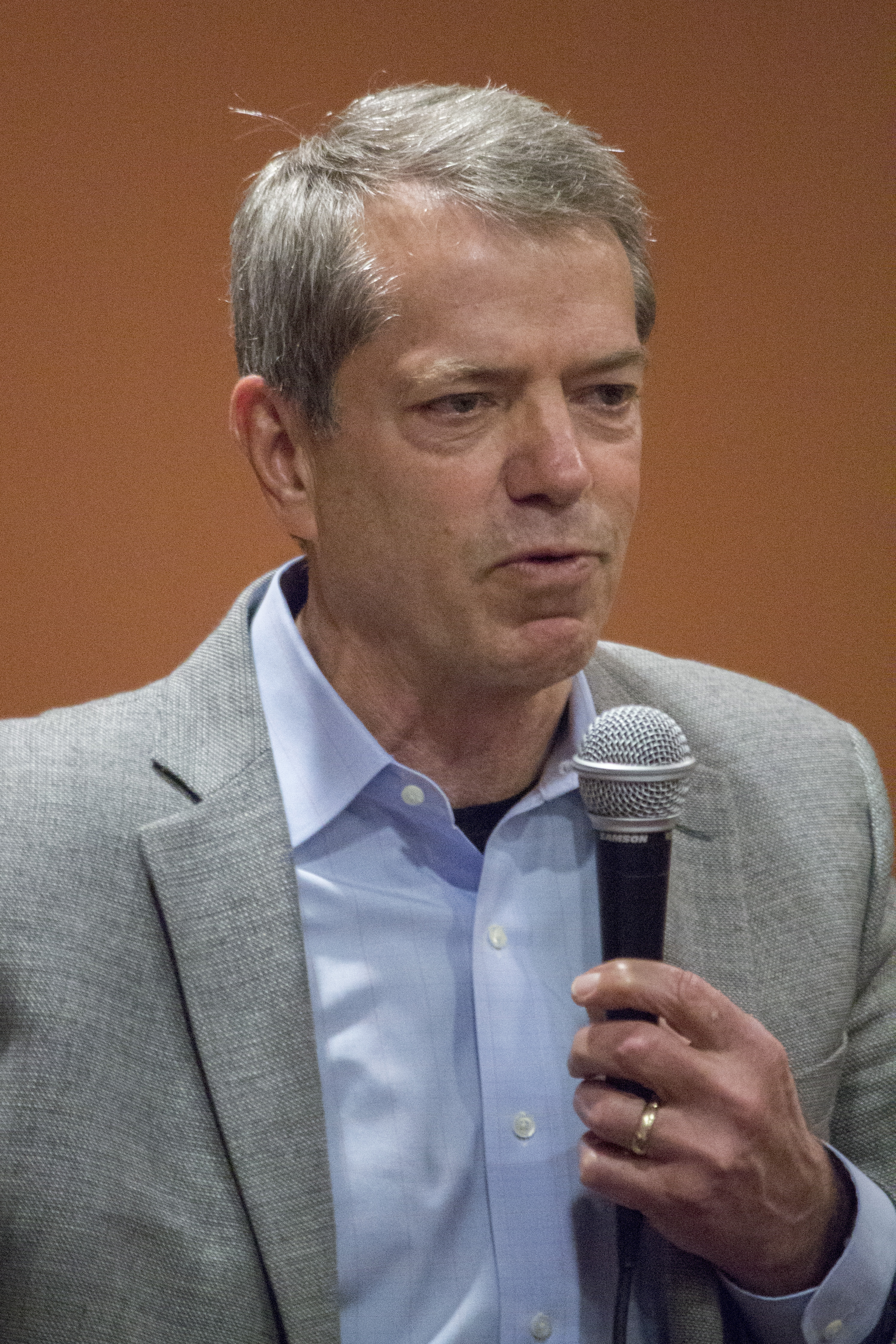
Jim Pillen (R)
Governor

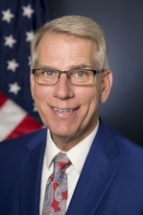
Joe Kelly (R)
Lieutenant Governor

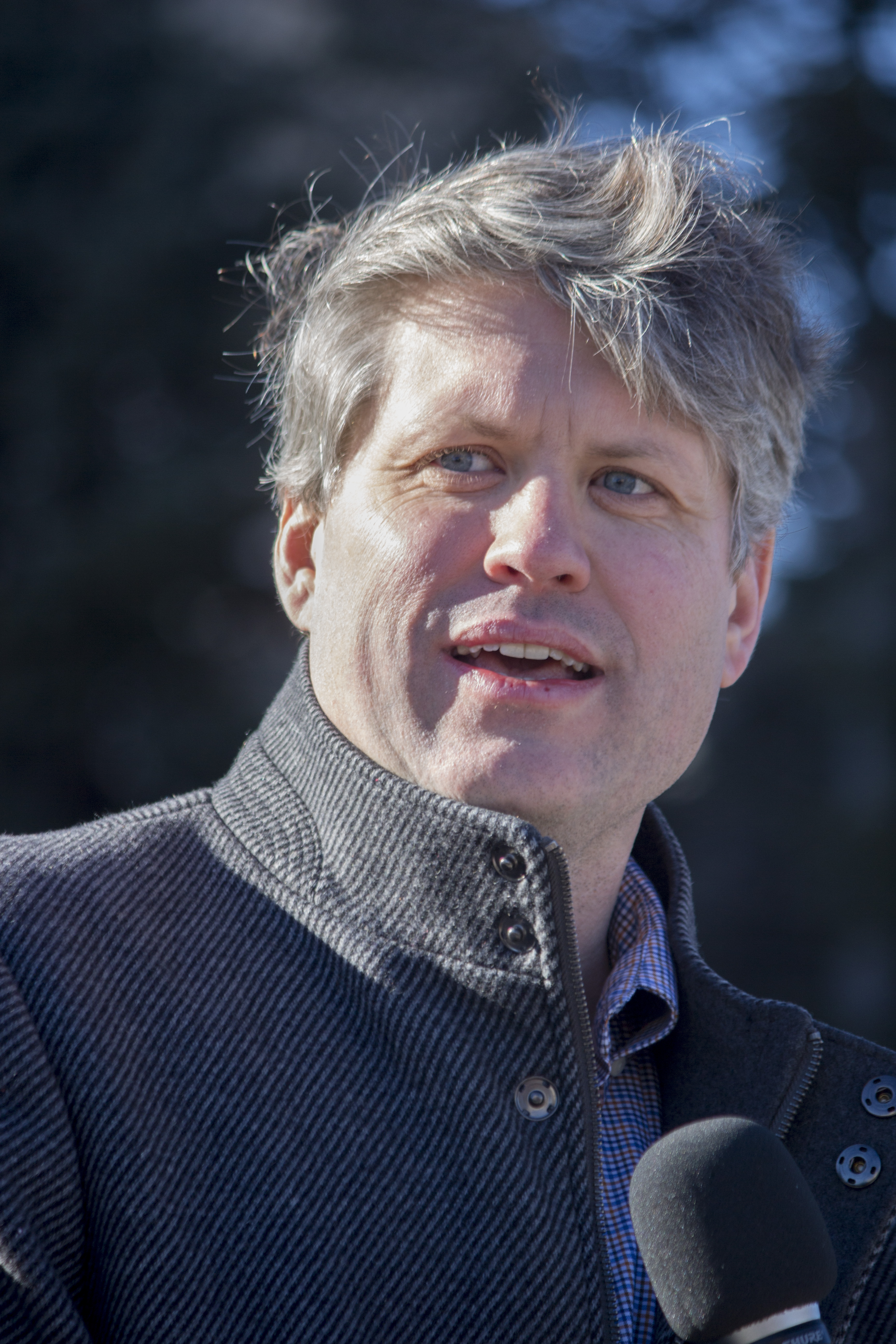
Mike Hilgers (R)
Attorney General

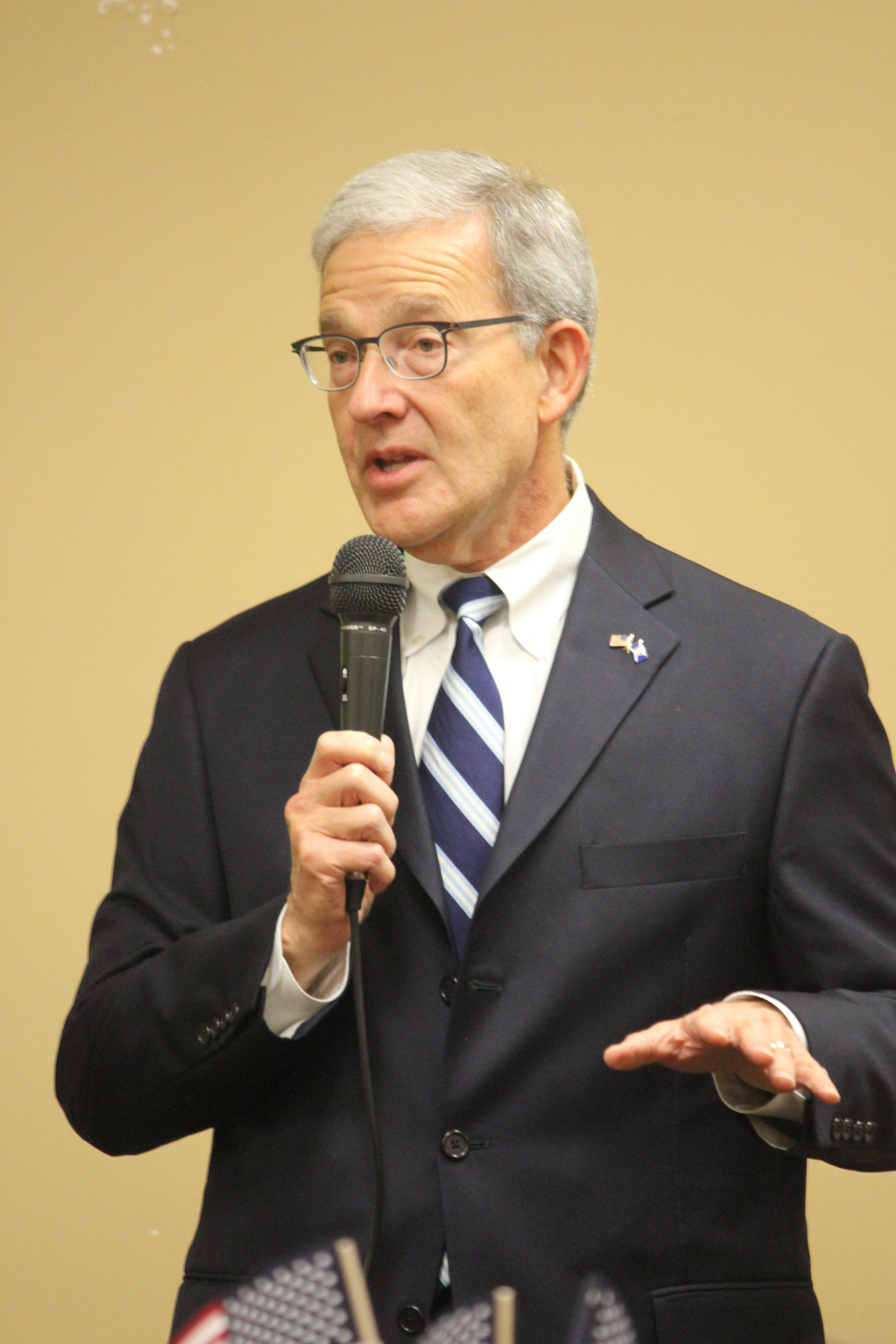
Bob Evnen (R)
Secretary of State

Joey Spellerberg
Treasurer

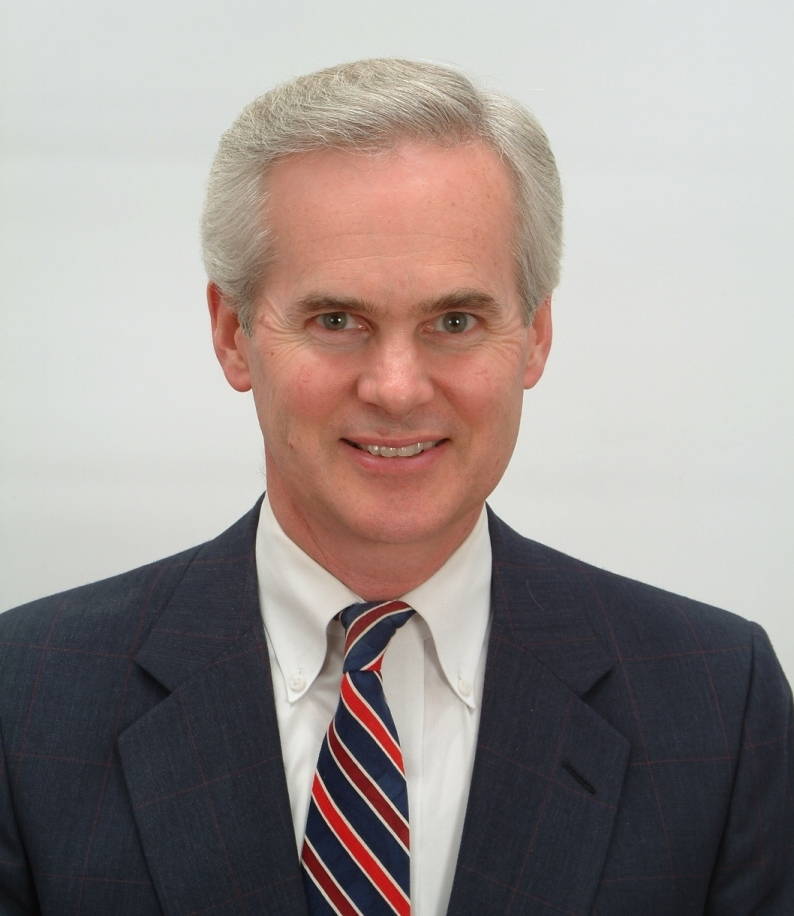
Mike Foley (R)
Auditor

=== Governor ===
The Governor of Nebraska is the head of government of the U.S. state of Nebraska as provided by the fourth article of the Constitution of Nebraska. The officeholder is elected to a four-year term, with elections held two years after presidential elections. The governor may be elected any number of times, but not more than twice in a row. Governors of Nebraska must be at least 30 years old and have been citizens and residents of the state for five years before being elected. Before 1966, the governor was elected to a two-year term. In 1962, a constitutional amendment extended the gubernatorial term to four years, effective with the 1966 election. In 1966, another amendment imposed a term limit of two consecutive terms. The lieutenant governor is subject to the same limitations and runs on a combined ticket with the governor. Charles W. Bryan is the only Governor of Nebraska to serve non-consecutive terms. Dave Heineman holds the record as Nebraska's longest-serving governor, with 10 years. The current officeholder is Jim Pillen, a Republican, who was sworn in on January 5, 2023.

=== Lieutenant governor ===
The Lieutenant Governor is the second-highest official in the Nebraska government and the first in line to succeed to the governorship in the event of a vacancy. The lieutenant governor is elected for a four-year term that runs concurrently with that of the governor. In the absence of the governor, the lieutenant governor assumes all powers and duties of the office of the governor. However, this only happens when the governor leaves the state or becomes incapable of discharging his duties as governor. The current Lieutenant Governor of Nebraska is Joe Kelly, who assumed office on January 5, 2023.

=== Secretary of State ===
The Secretary of State has responsibilities over the following areas: elections, business registrations, occupational licensing, state rules and regulations, records management, international relations and youth civics programs. The current Secretary of State is Bob Evnen.

=== Attorney General ===
The Nebraska Department of Justice/Office of the Attorney General operates, in many respects, as the “State’s law firm.” The office is headed by the Nebraska Attorney General, an independently-elected constitutional officer, and is a diverse organization of highly specialized attorneys and support staff. The Attorney General’s Office is the largest “law firm” in Nebraska outside of Omaha. The current Attorney General is Mike Hilgers, who assumed office on January 5, 2023.

=== State Treasurer ===
The Treasurer of the State of Nebraska is the chief financial officer of the government of Nebraska. The treasurer is responsible for maintaining the state funds by investing and maintaining the state budget. The department's main purpose is to invest state funds and maintain accurate records of transactions enacted by the state. The state office also disperses funds to local governments as needed, keeps track of unclaimed property and helps with investments. The current Treasurer is Joey Spellerberg, who assumed office on November 6, 2025.

=== Auditor of Public Accounts ===
The Auditor of Public Accounts has the constitutional authority to audit all state fiscal activity and the fiduciary responsibility to promulgate audit standards applicable to all state agencies and local governments. To this end, the Office of the Auditor of Public Accounts (APA) engages in financial audits of every state agency, officer, board, bureau and commission, conducts the annual single audit of federal awards received by the state, and investigates both reported and alleged waste, fraud, and mismanagement throughout state and local government. The current Auditor of Public Accounts is Mike Foley, who assumed office on January 5, 2023. Foley previously served in this role from 2007 to 2015.

=== State Agencies ===
Nebraska's executive branch includes the following 18 code agencies, all under direction from the Governor.

- Department of Administrative Services (DAS)
- Department of Agriculture (NDA)
- Department of Banking and Finance (NDBF)
- Department of Corrections (NDCS)
- Crime Commission (NCC)
- Department of Economic Development (NDED)
- Department of Education (NDE)
- Department of Environment and Energy (NDEE)
- Department of Health and Human Services (DHHS)
- Department of Insurance (NDOI)
- Department of Labor (NDOL)
- Department of Military (NENG)
- Department of Motor Vehicles (NDMV)
- Department of Natural Resources (NDNR)
- Department of Revenue (NDR)
- State Patrol (NSP)
- Department of Transportation (NDOT)
- Department of Veteran's Affairs (NDVA)

== Legislative branch ==
The Nebraska Legislature (also called the Unicameral) is the unicameral state legislature of the state of Nebraska. Its members are called "senators", as it was originally the upper house of a bicameral legislature until the Nebraska House of Representatives was dissolved in 1937. The legislature is unicameral and officially recognizes no party affiliation, making Nebraska unique among U.S. states. With 49 members, it is also the smallest state legislature of any U.S. state. The Legislature meets at the Nebraska State Capitol in Lincoln.

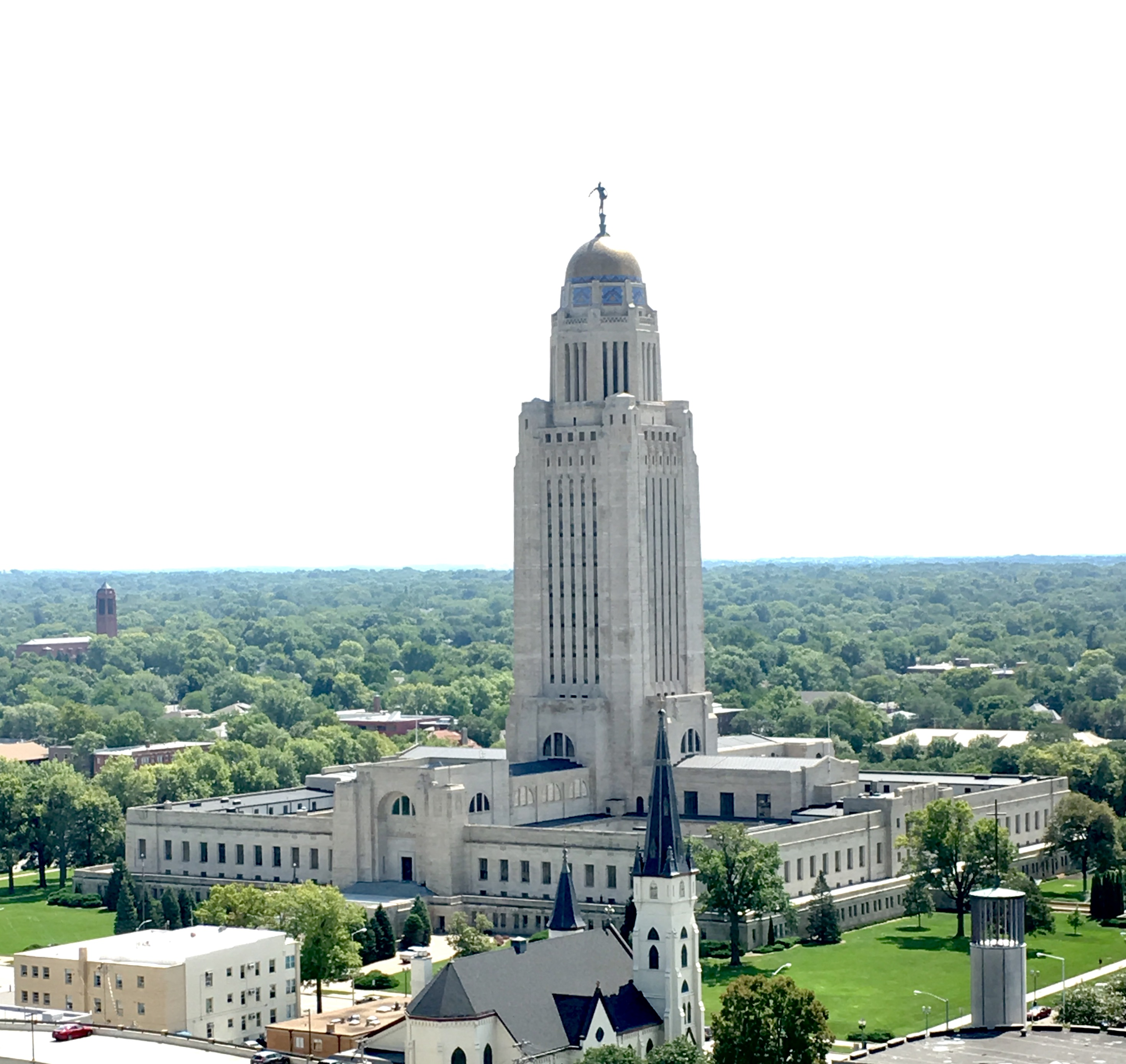
Nebraska State Capitol Building in Lincoln, NE.

=== General powers ===
The Legislature is responsible for law-making and appropriating funds for the state. The governor has the power to veto any bill, but the Legislature may override the governor's veto by a vote of three-fifths (30) of its members. The Legislature also has the power, by a three-fifths vote, to propose a constitutional amendment to the voters, who then pass or reject it through a referendum.

=== Selection, composition, and operation ===
The Legislature is composed of 49 members, chosen by a single-member district or constituency. Senators are chosen for four-year terms, with one-half of the seats up for election every second year. In effect, this results in half the chamber being elected at the same time as the President of the United States, and the other half elected at the same time as other statewide elections. Senators must be qualified voters who are at least 21 years old and have lived in the district they wish to represent for at least one year. A constitutional amendment passed in 2000 limits senators to two consecutive terms. However, a former senator is re-eligible for election after four years. Senators receive $12,000 a year.

Rather than separate primary elections held to choose Republican, Democratic, and other partisan contenders for a seat, Nebraska uses a single nonpartisan blanket primary, in which the top two vote-getters are entitled to run in the general election. There are no formal party alignments or groups within the Legislature. Coalitions tend to form issue by issue based on a member's philosophy of government, geographic background, and constituency. However, almost all the members of the legislature are known to be either Democrats or Republicans, and the state branches of both parties explicitly endorse candidates for legislative seats.

=== Speaker ===
The highest position among the members is the Speaker, who presides over the Legislature in the absence of the Lieutenant Governor. The Speaker is elected by floor ballot (or secret ballot) for a two-year term. The Speaker, with the approval of the Executive Board, determines the agenda (or the order in which bills and resolutions are considered on General File). The Speaker's agenda may be changed by a three-fifths vote of the elected members of the Legislature. The Speaker is not a member of any committee, but is an ex-officio member of the Rules Committee and the Executive Board. The current Speaker of the Nebraska Legislature is John Arch, who was elected to the office on January 4, 2023.

== Judicial Branch ==
The Nebraska Supreme Court is the highest court in the U.S. state of Nebraska. The court consists of a chief justice and six associate justices. Each justice is initially appointed by the governor of Nebraska; using the Missouri Plan, each justice is then subject to a retention vote for additional six-year terms. The six justices each represent a Supreme Court district; the chief justice is appointed (and retained) at-large.

Unlike most other states, with the exception of North Dakota, the Nebraska Supreme Court requires a supermajority of five justices of the seven to rule unconstitutional a legislative provision (the 48 other states require a simple majority).

=== Selection of justices ===
The court consists of a chief justice and six associate justices. The six associate justices each represent a Supreme Court district. If a position becomes vacant, the judicial nominating commission, made up of four lawyers and four non-lawyers, holds a hearing to select potential candidates. The commission then submits two names to the Nebraska Governor, who then determines the replacing judge. If the Governor does not follow through with this responsibility within 60 days of receiving the nominees, the responsibility then goes to the Chief Justice of the state Supreme Court. To retain the office, a judge must run in a retention election after serving three years. Additionally, the judge must run every six years to retain his seat. If the judge receives less than 50% of the affirmative vote, the judge is not retained. Nebraska judges do not have a mandatory retirement age, but they are granted retirement at age 65 or earlier, if it is due to disability.
