= Julie Slama =

Nebraskan state senator

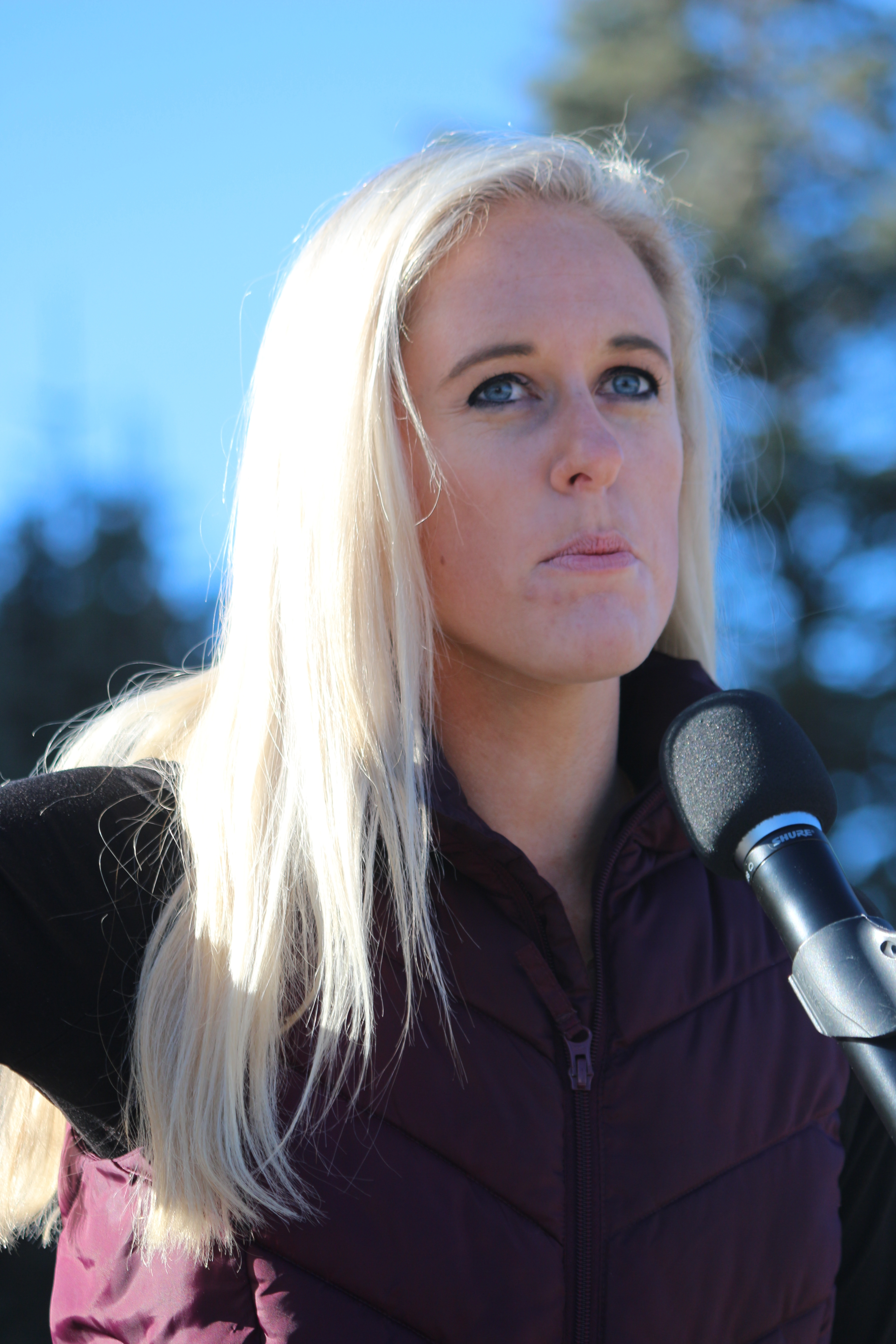

Member of the Nebraska Legislature from the 1st district
- In office January 9, 2019 – January 8, 2025
- Preceded by: Dan Watermeier
- Succeeded by: Robert Hallstrom

Personal details
- Born: May 2, 1996 (age 30) Lincoln, Nebraska, U.S.
- Party: Republican
- Spouse: Andrew La Grone (m. 2021)
- Children: 1
- Education: Yale University (BA); University of Nebraska–Lincoln (JD)
- Website: Campaign website

Julie Slama (born May 2, 1996) is an American politician who served in the Nebraska Legislature representing the 1st district from 2019 to 2025.

== Early life and education ==
Julie Slama was born on May 2, 1996. She graduated from Auburn High School in 2014. She graduated from Yale University with a bachelor's degree in political science in 2018, and the University of Nebraska College of Law in 2022. During her time at Yale she was the director of operations for Yale Daily News.

Slama was an alternate delegate to the 2014 United States Senate Youth Program. During the 2018 gubernatorial election she worked as the press secretary for Pete Ricketts's gubernatorial campaign.

== Nebraska Legislature ==
=== Elections ===
Dan Watermeier, a member of the Nebraska Legislature from the 1st district, was elected to the Nebraska Public Service Commission in 2018 and thus vacated his seat. Slama applied for the position and was appointed to the seat by Ricketts. She was the youngest member of the legislature's 2019 session and the third-youngest person to serve in the state legislature.

Slama announced her campaign for the 2020 election on July 10, 2019, and placed first in the primary against Janet Palmtag and Dennis Schaardt. She defeated Palmtag, who had the endorsement of former Governor Dave Heineman and U.S. Representative Jeff Fortenberry. Jessica Flanagain was her campaign manager. She defeated Palmtag in the general election.

Slama declined to file for re-election on February 15, 2024, and retired at the end of her tenure. She initially sought a second term.

=== Tenure ===
During Slama's tenure in the state legislature she has served on the Judiciary, Natural Resources, Reference, and Executive Board committees. In 2021, she sought the position of vice-chair of the Executive Board committee, but lost to Senator Tony Vargas.

Slama was named legislator of the year by the Young Republicans and placed on the Forbes 30 Under 30 in 2019. In 2022, Slama accused Charles Herbster of reaching up into her skirt at an event hosted by the Douglas County Republican Party in 2019. Both filed lawsuits against each other, but later dropped them.

== Later life ==
On November 3, 2025, Slama announced that she would run for Nebraska State Treasurer in the 2026 election. However, she ended her campaign two days later and endorsed Joey Spellerberg.

== Political positions ==
Slama proposed legislation to require students in 8th and 11th grade to pass the American Civics Test. She proposed legislation to expand the castle doctrine to include occupied vehicles. She supported an attempt to call a special legislative session to pass legislation to prohibit vaccine requirements by businesses, governmental entities, and schools. She opposed expanding Supplemental Nutrition Assistance Program benefits to people with felony drug convictions. She proposed anti-Boycott, Divestment and Sanctions legislation.

Slama opposes abortion in all cases, including when the life of the mother is at risk. She proposed a heartbeat bill in 2022. She proposed a motion to censure Senator Machaela Cavanaugh for stating that legislation prohibiting gender-affirming care for transgender children was akin to genocide, but Speaker John Arch declined to have it go forward.

Slama proposed a constitutional amendment to require voter ID in order to vote. She proposed legislation to alter Nebraska's selection of presidential electors by switching to having them selected through winner-take-all. She proposed a constitutional amendment to make the state legislature partisan.

== Personal life ==
Slama converted to Catholicism. Her twin sister, Emily, was appointed by Ricketts to the Sarpy County Election Commission in October 2021. She married former state senator Andrew La Grone on December 18, 2021. Slama and La Grone have a son.

== Electoral history ==
2020 Nebraska Legislature 1st district primary
Primary election
Party	Candidate	Votes	%
Nonpartisan	Julie Slama (incumbent)	6,553	60.47%
Nonpartisan	Janet Palmtag	2,244	20.71%
Nonpartisan	Dennis Schaardt	1,954	18.03%
Write-in		86	0.79%
Total votes		10,837	100.00%
General election
Nonpartisan	Julie Slama (incumbent)	12,033	68.14%
Nonpartisan	Janet Palmtag	5,627	31.86%
Total votes		17,660	100.00%
