= Joseph S. Bartley =

State Treasurer of Nebraska (1858–1926)

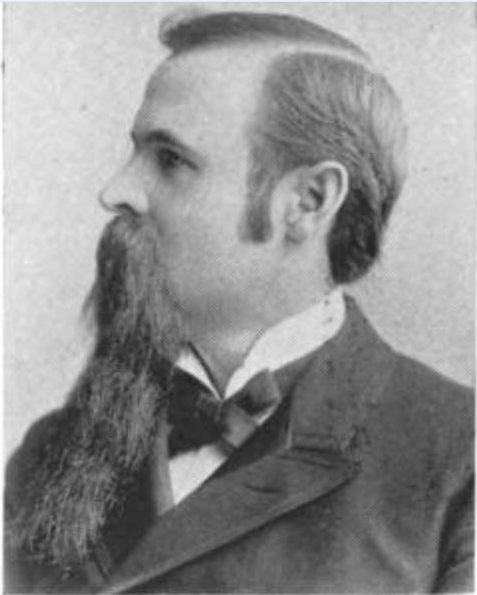
- Bartley in 1895

9th Treasurer of Nebraska
- In office 1893–1897
- Governor: Lorenzo Crounse; Silas A. Holcomb
- Preceded by: John E. Hill
- Succeeded by: John B. Meserve

Personal details
- Born: 28 October 1858
- Died: 18 September 1926 (aged 67)
- Party: Republican

Joseph S. Bartley (October 28, 1858 – September 18, 1926) was the ninth State Treasurer of Nebraska, serving from 1893 to 1897, after which he was convicted of embezzlement and sentenced to 20 years in prison.

== Early life and career ==
Bartley was born in Dearborn County, Indiana where he was raised on a farm and educated in a public school. He subsequently moved to Kankakee, Illinois, and in 1880, to a homestead in Holt County, Nebraska. In 1884, he moved to Atkinson. When he was 26, he founded the Exchange Bank of Atkinson, and in 1886, he was elected its president.

Bartley first ventured into politics in 1888, when he sought the Republican nomination for treasurer in the contest to complete Charles H. Willard's second term. Although he came third in that race, he acquired such a reputation in the process that, when he tried again in August 1892, he won the nomination by acclamation. He was elected treasurer in November. On August 22, 1894, he received the Republican nomination for his second term as Treasurer, and was re-elected.

== Downfall ==
Bartley's second term in office ended on January 7, 1897. It was subsequently discovered that he was unable to transfer the state's treasury funds to his successor. In February 1897, the Nebraska Legislature "appointed a joint committee to make recommendations concerning defalcations and embezzlement" by Bartley. On February 28, he was arrested, and released on $50,000 bond. On March 17, Bartley was arrested again, and released on $200,000 bond.

As these two arrests had taken place in different counties — the first in Douglas County, on charges of having embezzled a $181,000 general fund, and the second in Lancaster County, on charges of having embezzled $535,000 which included the $181,000 — Nebraska Attorney General Constantine Joseph Smyth was concerned that Bartley's lawyers might argue that this was in violation of prohibitions on double jeopardy; as such, Smyth had the second charge against Bartley "dismissed without prejudice to a new action". On April 30, 1897, Bartley was arrested for a third time; on May 8, the Nebraska State Banking Board seized Bartley's bank, the Exchange Bank of Atkinson.

Bartley's trial began on June 8, 1897, with an announcement of an attempt at jury tampering: Omaha resident Josiah S. Wright had offered one juror $75 (the equivalent of $2862 in 2024 money) to acquit Bartley, on behalf of an individual who Wright could not identify. Wright pleaded guilty and was sentenced to two years in prison. The prosecution finished its arguments four days later. On June 23, Bartley was found guilty. On June 26, he was sentenced to twenty years in prison and a fine of $303,768.90 (the equivalent of $11.6M in 2024 money), and was "remanded to jail pending a hearing of a motion for a new trial." His attorneys requested that he be released on bail pending appeal; however, he was unable to raise the $125,000 requested.

== Aftermath ==
On July 7, 1897, Bartley began his sentence at the Nebraska State Penitentiary. The warden declined to immediately assign him with labor as he was suffering from granulated eyelid. In November, Bartley attempted to have himself declared legally dead, on the grounds that he was now a convicted criminal, so that he could not be a co-defendant in a state lawsuit attempting to recover money from his associates. In June 1898, the Supreme Court of Nebraska upheld Bartley's conviction. In December 1898, the State of Nebraska filed a suit against the Omaha National Bank, in an effort to regain the nearly $203,000 (nearly $7.8M in 2024 money) that Bartley had paid to the bank in January 1897.

Nebraska also filed a suit against those of Bartley's associates who had paid his bond. In February 1898, a jury found in favor of the defendants, and the case was dismissed. In December 1898, the Supreme Court of Nebraska overturned the dismissal and ordered a new trial. The second trial took place in July 1899, and the jury found in favor of the state. In December 1899, the Supreme Court of Nebraska overturned this verdict as well, and ordered a third trial. That trial took place in July 1901, with a verdict in favor of the state.

On the evening of Saturday, July 13, 1901, new Nebraska governor Ezra P. Savage ordered Bartley released on parole; the only people notified were Bartley's attorney and the prison warden. Savage's decision was so unpopular that the Republican state convention — Savage's own party — passed a resolution condemning it and requesting that it be canceled, by a vote of 998 to 165. On August 27, Savage made a public statement explaining his reasons for having granted Bartley parole, including that he expected Bartley would assist in efforts to recover the missing money, and that if Bartley did not, the parole would expire after 60 days; nonetheless, Savage revoked Bartley's parole the next day. Bartley protested that he should be allowed to remain free until September 13, but Savage emphasized that the resolution called for Bartley's immediate re-incarceration.

On December 31, 1901, at 7 pm, Savage issued Bartley a full pardon, stating that his actions had prevented multiple bank failures and that he had been punished enough; by 9 pm, Bartley had been released. He had spent four years and six months in prison, "in addition to a year in the Douglas County jail while his appeal to the [Nebraska] Supreme Court was pending." In addition to his statement, Savage also cited "petitions containing the names of more than 4,000 of the state's most prominent citizens, asking for Bartley's freedom;" by January 10, 1902, there were reports that signatures on the petitions had been forged or misappropriated.

In June 1902, the Supreme Court of Nebraska overturned the July 1901 verdict against Bartley's associates, and ordered a fourth trial. The fourth trial led to a verdict in favor of the defendants, which again led to the dismissal of the case; in December 1905, the Supreme Court of Nebraska upheld the dismissal, and Nebraska Attorney General Norris Brown announced that the decision was "final". In June 1906, a related attempt to recover $500,000 was quashed on the grounds that "the bill of exceptions in the case was not properly certified".

Bartley subsequently returned to banking. In 1903, a journalist from the Omaha Daily Bee attempted to interview him; when asked about allegations he was supporting himself on interest payments from loans taken with the embezzled money, Bartley stated "That is my business and I refuse to talk about it." At some point before 1910, Bartley left Nebraska, and eventually settled in Colorado, where he died at Denver on September 18, 1926.

== Political legacy ==
Savage subsequently abandoned his plans of running for a second term as governor; several historians have attributed this decision to the backlash he experienced as a result of paroling and pardoning Bartley. Contemporary media noted speculation that Savage had expected Bartley to return the missing funds in time for Savage to receive his party's nomination the following June. In 1903, when Senator Charles H. Dietrich was arrested on charges of having accepted bribes, he claimed that this was retaliation for his refusal, during his own term as governor of Nebraska, to pardon Bartley.

During Gilbert Hitchcock's 1910 campaign for US Senate, Edgar Howard published an open letter on the front page of the Omaha Daily Bee accusing Hitchcock of having "borrowed large sums of money from Joseph S. Bartley during the time when Mr. Bartley was treasurer of the state of Nebraska, which money has never been returned to the state treasury nor to the pocket of Joseph Bartley". Later that month, Bartley offered to return to Nebraska and testify against Hitchcock before a legislative committee; this offer was declined. Hitchcock subsequently stated that he had only borrowed money from Bartley when Bartley was a banker, "four years before he became a defaulter", and that the money had been repaid; he further claimed that the photographs of an alleged correspondence between himself and Bartley were forgeries.
