= 2026 Idaho State Treasurer election =

- November 3, 2026
| Nominee | Julie Ellsworth | Kevin Jones |
| Party | Republican | Democratic |
| Popular vote | 455,121 | 240,020 |
| Percentage | 65.5% | 34.5% |
- Ellsworth: 50–60% 60–70% 70–80% 80–90% Jones: 50–60% 60–70%
State Treasurer before election
Julie Ellsworth
Republican
Elected State Treasurer
Julie Ellsworth
Republican

The 2026 Idaho State Treasurer election was held on November 3, 2026, to elect the Idaho State Treasurer. Incumbent Republican State Treasurer Julie Ellsworth won re-election to a third term in office; defeating Democratic challenger Kevin Jones.

Primary elections were held May 19, 2026. Primaries for both major parties were uncontested.

== Republican primary ==
=== Candidates ===
==== Nominee ====
- Julie Ellsworth, incumbent state treasurer

=== Results ===
Republican primary results
| Party | Candidate | Votes | % |
|---|---|---|---|
| Republican | Julie Ellsworth (incumbent) | 186,498 | 100.0 |
| Total votes | | 186,498 | 100.0 |

== Democratic primary ==
=== Candidates ===
==== Nominee ====
- Kevin Jones, Chartered Financial Analyst

=== Results ===
Democratic primary results
| Party | Candidate | Votes | % |
|---|---|---|---|
| Democratic | Kevin Jones | 42,780 | 100.0 |
| Total votes | | 42,780 | 100.0 |

== See also ==
- 2026 United States state treasurer elections
- 2026 Idaho elections
