= 2022 Nebraska State Treasurer election =

- November 8, 2022
- Turnout: 54.93%
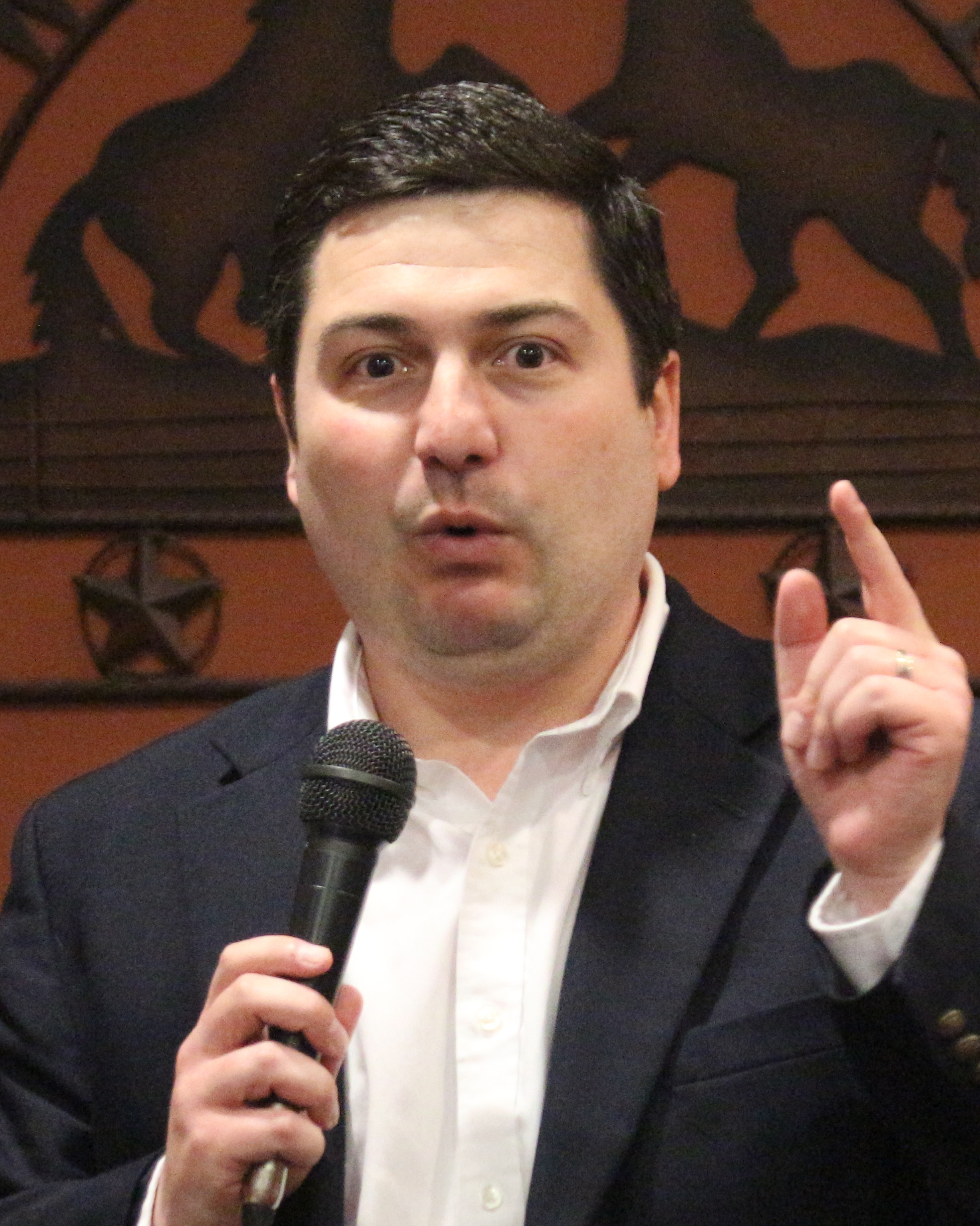

Candidate	John Murante	Katrina Tomsen
Party	Republican	Libertarian
Popular vote	431,193	165,951
Percentage	72.21%	27.79%
- County results Murante: 60-70% 70-80% 80-90% >90%
State Treasurer before election
John Murante
Republican
Elected State Treasurer
John Murante
Republican

The 2022 Nebraska State Treasurer election took place on November 8, 2022, to elect the Nebraska State Treasurer. Incumbent Republican Treasurer John Murante won reelection to his second term in office.

== Republican primary ==
=== Candidates ===
- John Murante, incumbent state treasurer
- Paul Anderson, businessman

=== Results ===
Republican primary results
Party	Candidate	Votes	%
Republican	John Murante (inc.)	121,808	56.98%
Republican	Paul Anderson	92,522	43.02%
Total votes		214,330	100.00%

== Libertarian convention ==
=== Candidates ===
- Katrina Tomsen, businesswoman

== General election ==
=== Results ===
2022 Nebraska State Treasurer election
Party	Candidate	Votes	%	±%
Republican	John Murante (inc.)	431,193	72.21%	−27.79%
Libertarian	Katrina Tomsen	165,951	27.79%	—
Majority		265,242	44.42%	−55.58%
Turnout		597,144		
Republican hold				

==== By county ====
County	John Murante Republican		Katrina Tomsen Libertarian		Total votes
County	%	#	%	#	Total votes
Adams	78.9%	7,383	21.1%	1,970	9,353
Antelope	89.1%	2,017	10.9%	247	3,408
Arthur	91.1%	205	8.9%	20	225
Banner	90.5%	314	9.5%	33	347
Blaine	87.0%	161	13.0%	24	185
Boone	86.7%	1,992	13.3%	305	2,297
Box Butte	80.1%	2,514	19.9%	624	3,138
Boyd	89.5%	711	10.5%	83	794
Brown	88.5%	1,036	11.5%	135	1,171
Buffalo	80.7%	11,873	19.3%	2,842	14,715
Burt	79.8%	1,997	20.2%	505	2,502
Butler	85.0%	2,649	15.0%	467	3,116
Cass	74.4%	7,710	25.6%	2,650	10,360
Cedar	88.2%	3,156	11.8%	421	3,586
Chase	91.2%	1,291	8.8%	124	1,415
Cherry	87.7%	2,070	12.3%	291	2,361
Cheyenne	83.8%	2,600	16.2%	504	3,104
Clay	85.2%	2,147	14.8%	374	2,521
Colfax	82.8%	1,803	17.2%	375	2,178
Cuming	86.1%	2,509	13.9%	404	2,913
Custer	87.2%	3,549	12.8%	521	4,070
Dakota	77.8%	2,628	22.2%	750	3,378
Dawes	79.1%	2,301	20.9%	609	2,910
Dawson	82.8%	4,289	17.2%	888	5,177
Deuel	86.4%	609	13.6%	96	705
Dixon	83.8%	1,755	16.2%	340	2,095
Dodge	75.3%	7,941	24.7%	2,606	10,547
Douglas	61.8%	100,249	38.2%	61,927	162,176
Dundy	89.3%	632	10.7%	76	708
Fillmore	82.2%	1,808	17.8%	392	2,200
Franklin	86.7%	979	13.3%	150	1,129
Frontier	88.4%	888	11.6%	117	1,005
Furnas	87.0%	1,539	13.0%	230	1,769
Gage	77.2%	5,571	22.8%	1,641	7,212
Garden	87.6%	740	12.4%	105	845
Garfield	90.6%	633	9.4%	66	699
Gosper	90.0%	708	10.0%	79	787
Grant	94.2%	243	5.8%	15	258
Greeley	85.5%	732	14.5%	124	856
Hall	78.2%	10,828	21.8%	3,023	13,851
Hamilton	83.7%	3,110	16.3%	607	3,717
Harlan	87.9%	1,158	12.1%	160	1,318
Hayes	95.3%	343	4.7%	17	360
Hitchcock	88.7%	871	11.3%	111	982
Holt	89.0%	3,267	11.0%	403	3,670
Hooker	89.0%	309	11.0%	38	347
Howard	83.2%	1,873	16.8%	377	2,250
Jefferson	80.4%	1,997	19.6%	488	2,485
Johnson	77.5%	1,134	22.5%	330	1,464
Kearney	81.7%	2,007	18.3%	450	2,457
Keith	87.1%	2,398	12.9%	355	2,723
Keya Paha	90.1%	345	9.9%	38	383
Kimball	86.4%	1,097	13.6%	173	1,270
Knox	85.6%	2,906	14.4%	487	3,393
Lancaster	64.3%	60,784	35.7%	33,797	94,581
Lincoln	81.4%	9,183	18.6%	2,100	11,283
Logan	90.8%	285	9.2%	29	314
Loup	86.8%	270	13.2%	41	311
Madison	84.4%	9,148	15.6%	1,689	10,837
McPherson	95.2%	200	4.8%	10	210
Merrick	85.5%	2,576	14.5%	437	3,013
Morrill	83.6%	1,544	16.4%	302	1,846
Nance	83.0%	919	17.0%	188	1,107
Nemaha	78.8%	1,703	21.2%	459	2,162
Nuckolls	87.0%	1,293	13.0%	194	1,487
Otoe	78.4%	4,189	21.6%	1,152	5,341
Pawnee	84.0%	822	16.0%	156	978
Perkins	89.5%	90	10.5%	112	202
Phelps	88.6%	3,074	11.4%	396	3,470
Pierce	89.4%	2,397	10.6%	285	2,682
Platte	85.3%	8,730	14.7%	1,508	10,238
Polk	86.7%	1,651	13.3%	253	1,904
Red Willow	86.0%	3,246	14.0%	530	3,776
Richardson	79.1%	2,110	20.9%	559	2,669
Rock	90.4%	497	9.6%	53	550
Saline	74.5%	2,542	25.5%	870	3,412
Sarpy	68.6%	39,522	31.4%	18,079	57,601
Saunders	78.2%	6,837	21.8%	1,902	8,739
Scotts Bluff	79.2%	7,222	20.8%	2,899	10,121
Seward	81.4%	4,984	18.6%	1,136	6,120
Sheridan	86.7%	1,565	13.3%	240	1,805
Sherman	82.3%	920	17.7%	198	1,118
Sioux	89.2%	444	10.8%	54	498
Stanton	87.0%	2,009	13.0%	300	2,309
Thayer	85.3%	1,713	14.7%	295	2,008
Thomas	90.9%	271	9.1%	27	298
Thurston	71.5%	807	28.5%	321	1,128
Valley	85.0%	1,411	15.0%	249	1,660
Washington	79.5%	6,397	20.5%	1,653	8,020
Wayne	83.3%	2,323	16.7%	467	2,790
Webster	85.0%	1,042	15.0%	184	1,226
Wheeler	90.0%	287	10.0%	32	319
York	83.9%	3,838	16.1%	734	4,572

== See also ==
- 2022 United States treasurer elections
