= John Murante =

American politician (born 1982)

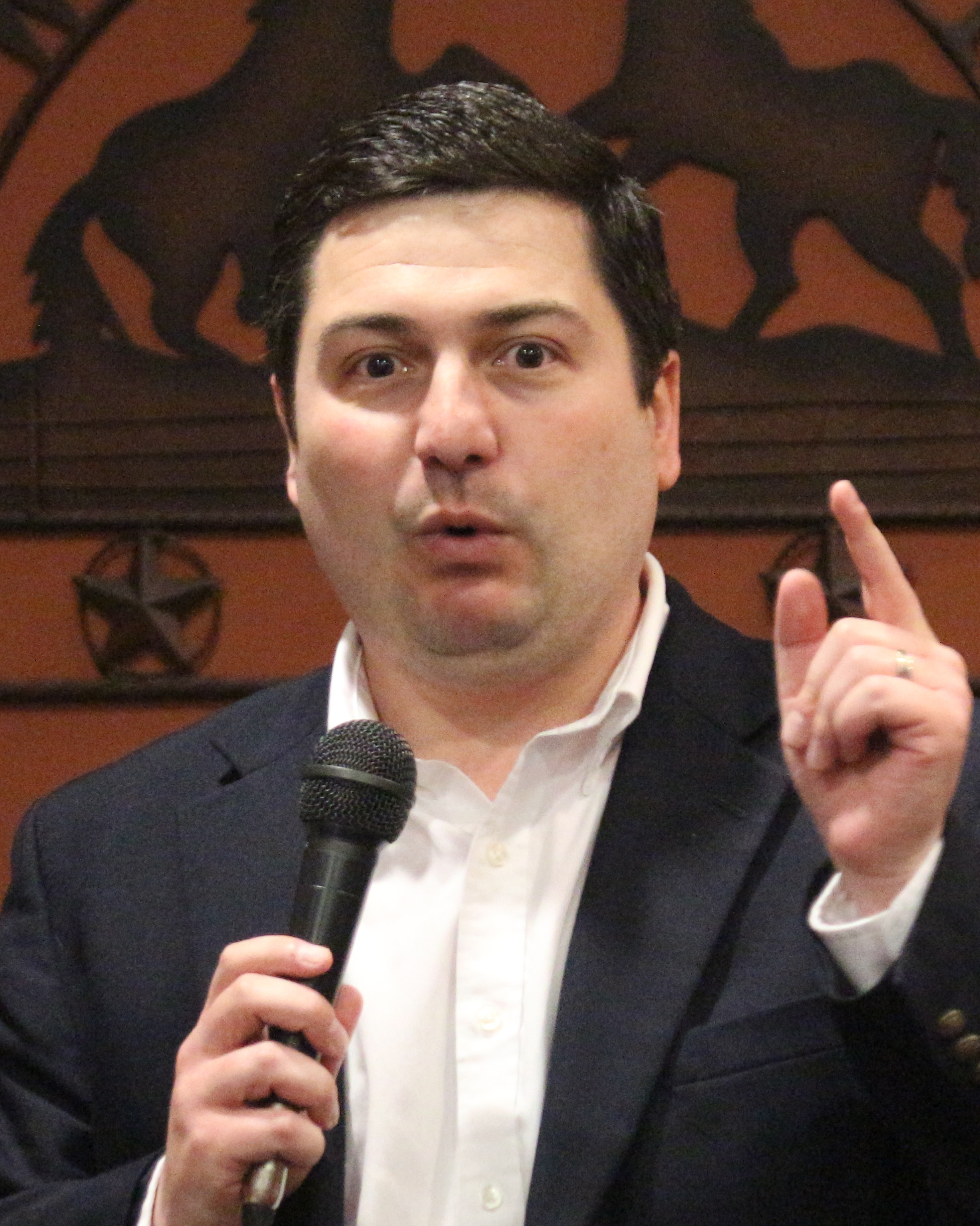

42nd Treasurer of Nebraska
- In office January 9, 2019 – September 18, 2023
- Governor: Pete Ricketts; Jim Pillen
- Preceded by: Don Stenberg
- Succeeded by: Tom Briese

Member of the Nebraska Legislature from the 49th district
- In office January 9, 2013 – January 9, 2019
- Preceded by: LeRoy Louden
- Succeeded by: Andrew La Grone

Personal details
- Born: February 6, 1982 (age 44) Omaha, Nebraska, U.S.
- Party: Republican
- Education: University of Nebraska–Lincoln (BA)

John Murante (born February 6, 1982) is an American politician who served as the 44th Nebraska State Treasurer from 2019 to 2023. A member of the Republican Party, he previously was elected to the unicameral Nebraska Legislature from 2013 until 2019, representing District 49.

== Education ==
A native of Omaha, Nebraska, Murante earned his bachelor's degree from University of Nebraska–Lincoln.

== Elections ==
When Senator LeRoy Louden retired and left the District 49 seat open, Murante placed first in the May 15, 2012, primary election with 2,359 votes, and won the November 6, 2012, general election with 8,508 votes against Frank Wellenstein.

Murante ran for Treasurer of Nebraska in 2018. He defeated Taylor Royal in the Republican primary, and ran unopposed in the general election.

In September 2019, Murante helped open a satellite Treasurer's Office in Omaha to provide a location for residents to file unclaimed property claims and access other services provided by the department. Although the truthfulness of this is in dispute, and the lease currently costs taxpayers over $58,000 per year over a span of ten years

Murante resigned as Treasurer in September 2023 after accepting a position as director of the Nebraska Public Employees Retirement Systems.

Party political offices
Preceded by Don Stenberg	Republican nominee for Treasurer of Nebraska; 2018, 2022	Succeeded by Joey Spellerberg
Political offices
Preceded by Don Stenberg	Treasurer of Nebraska; 2019–2023	Succeeded by Tom Briese
