= Tom Briese =

American politician

43rd Treasurer of Nebraska
- In office November 1, 2023 – November 6, 2025
- Governor: Jim Pillen
- Preceded by: John Murante
- Succeeded by: Joey Spellerberg

Chair of the Executive Board of the Nebraska Legislature
- In office January 4, 2023 – October 31, 2023
- Preceded by: Dan Hughes
- Succeeded by: Ray Aguilar

Member of the Nebraska Legislature from the 41st district
- In office January 4, 2017 – October 31, 2023
- Preceded by: Kate Sullivan
- Succeeded by: Fred Meyer

Personal details
- Born: April 12, 1959 (age 67) Albion, Nebraska, U.S.
- Party: Republican
- Education: University of Nebraska–Lincoln (BS, JD)

Tom Briese (born April 12, 1959) is an American politician who served as Nebraska State Treasurer from 2023 to 2025. He previously served in the Nebraska Legislature, representing the 41st district from 2017 to 2023.

== Political career ==
Tom Briese was elected as state senator for Nebraska's Legislative District 41 in 2016 and was re-elected in 2020. In 2022, Briese proposed a constitutional amendment to allow for the recall election of governors and state senators, which gained traction in 2023 after fellow state senator Merv Riepe voted against the Nebraska Heartbeat Act, which would have banned most abortions after six-weeks. Ultimately, the proposed amendment was postponed indefinitely.

In September 2023 Briese was appointed by Governor Jim Pillen to succeed John Murante as Nebraska State Treasurer; he assumed office on November 1, 2023. On November 3, 2025, Governor Pillen announced that Briese would resign as Treasurer just two years after he was appointed.

Nebraska Legislature
Preceded by Dan Hughes	Chair of the Executive Board of the Nebraska Legislature; 2023	Succeeded by Ray Aguilar; Acting
Political offices
Preceded by John Murante	Treasurer of Nebraska; 2023–2025	Succeeded by Joey Spellerberg
