= Nebraska State Treasurer =

State Treasurer of Nebraska
- Incumbent; Joey Spellerberg since November 6, 2025
- Seat: Lincoln
- Appointer: Governor of Nebraska (if office is vacant)
- Term length: 4 years
- Precursor: Treasurer of the Territory of Nebraska
- Formation: 1855 (Territorial); 1866 (State)
- First holder: Benjamin P. Rankin (Territorial); Augustus Kountze (State)
- Website: https://treasurer.nebraska.gov

The Nebraska Treasurer is the chief financial officer in the U.S. state of Nebraska. The current treasurer is Joey Spellerberg, who has served as treasurer since November 6, 2025.

The Treasurer of the State of Nebraska is the chief financial officer of the government of Nebraska. The treasurer is responsible for maintaining the state funds by investing and maintaining the state budget. The department's main purpose is to invest state funds and maintain accurate records of transactions enacted by the state. The state office also disperses funds to local governments as needed, keeps track of unclaimed property and helps with investments.

== List of territorial treasurers ==
No.	Treasurer	Term	Party
1	Benjamin P. Rankin (Note: Appointed by Governor Francis Burt to serve until the 1855 general election.)	1855	Democratic
2	William W. Wyman	1855–1861	Democratic
3	Augustus Kountze	1861–1867	Republican

== List of state treasurers ==
Parties

Republican (35) Democratic (7) Fusion (Democratic/Populist) (2)

No.	Image	Treasurer	Term	Party
1		Augustus Kountze (Note: Term began February 21, 1867.)	1867–1869	Republican
2		James Sweet	1869–1871	Republican
3		Henry A. Koenig	1871–1875	Republican
4		James C. McBride	1875–1879	Republican
5		George M. Bartlett	1879–1883	Republican
6		Phelps D. Sturdevant	1883–1885	Fusion (Note: Joint Anti-Monopolist and Democratic ticket.)
7		Charles H. Willard	1885–1889	Republican
8		John E. Hill	1889–1893	Republican
9		Joseph S. Bartley	1893–1897	Republican
10		John B. Meserve	1897–1901	Fusion (Note: Joint Populist-Democratic ticket.)
11		William Stuefer	1901–1903	Republican
12		Peter Mortensen	1903–1907	Republican
13		Lawson G. Brian	1907–1911	Republican
14		Walter A. George	1911–1915	Republican
15		George E. Hall	1915–1919	Democratic
16		Daniel B. Cropsey	1919–1923	Republican
17		Charles D. Robinson	1923–1927	Republican
18		Willis M. Stebbins	1927–1931	Republican
19		Truman W. Bass	1931–1933	Republican
–		George E. Hall (Note: Died Dec. 21, 1936.)	1933–1936	Democratic
20		Horatio J. Murray (Note: In office Dec. 21, 1936, to Jan. 7, 1937.)	1936–1937	Democratic
21		Walter H. Jensen	1937–1939	Democratic
–		Truman W. Bass (Note: Died Aug. 21, 1939.)	1939	Republican
22		John Havekost (Note: In office Aug. 26, 1939, to 1941.)	1939–1941	Democratic
23		Lucian B. Johnson	1941–1943	Republican
24		Carl G. Swanson (Note: In office 1943 to Dec. 31, 1945.)	1943–1945	Republican
25		Edward Gillette (Note: Appointed by Governor Dwight Griswold to fill a vacancy on Jan. 1, 1946. Elected in November 1946.)	1946–1951	Republican
26		Frank B. Heintze	1951–1955	Republican
27		Ralph W. Hill (Note: Died July 13, 1958.)	1955–1958	Republican
28		Bertha I. Hill (Note: Appointed by Governor Victor Anderson to fill a vacancy in July 1958.)	1958–1959	Republican
29		Richard R. Larsen	1959–1961	Democratic
30		Clarence L. E. Swanson (Note: Died April 5, 1964.)	1961–1964	Republican
31		P. Merle Humphries (Note: Appointed by Governor Frank B. Morrison to fill a vacancy on April 10, 1964.)	1964–1965	Republican
32		Fred Sorensen	1965–1967	Democratic
33		Wayne Swanson	1967–1975	Republican
34		Frank Marsh (Note: Resigned June 1981.)	1975–1981	Republican
35		Kay Orr (Note: Appointed by Governor Charles Thone on June 15, 1981, to complete term of Frank Marsh, who resigned; elected Nov. 2, 1982.)	1981–1987	Republican
–		Frank Marsh	1987–1991	Republican
36		Dawn Rockey	1991–1995	Democratic
37		David Heineman (Note: Resigned Sept. 2001 to become the Lieutenant Governor.)	1995–2001	Republican
38		Lorelee Hunt Byrd (Note: Appointed by Governor Mike Johanns on Oct. 1, 2001, to complete term of David Heineman, who resigned to become Lieutenant Governor of Nebraska; elected Nov. 5, 2002. Resigned Jan. 6, 2004.)	2001–2004	Republican
39		Ron Ross (Note: Appointed by Governor Mike Johanns on Jan. 6, 2004, to complete term of Lorelee Hunt Byrd, who resigned.)	2004–2007	Republican
40		Shane Osborn	2007–2011	Republican
41		Don Stenberg	2011–2019	Republican
42		John Murante (Note: Resigned September 18, 2023, to become the director of the Nebraska Public Employees Retirement Systems) (Note: Governor Jim Pillen served officially as acting treasurer of Nebraska from Sept. 18, 2023 to Nov. 1, 2023, while assistant Nebraska treasurer Rachel Biar ran the office of the treasurer in the interim.)	2019–2023	Republican
43		Tom Briese (Note: Appointed by Governor Jim Pillen on Sept. 14, 2023, to take office on Nov. 1, 2023, to complete the term of John Murante.)	2023–2025	Republican
44		Joey Spellerberg (Note: Appointed by Governor Jim Pillen on Nov. 3, 2025, and took office on Nov. 6, 2025, to complete the term of Tom Briese who resigned.)	2025–present	Republican
