= Joey Spellerberg =

American politician

44th Treasurer of Nebraska
- Incumbent
- Assumed office November 6, 2025
- Governor: Jim Pillen
- Preceded by: Tom Briese

Mayor of Fremont
- In office December 8, 2020 – November 4, 2025
- Preceded by: Scott Getzschman
- Succeeded by: Dev Sookram

Personal details
- Born: Joseph Lawrence Spellerberg; March 19, 1990 (age 36) Omaha, Nebraska, U.S.
- Party: Republican
- Spouse: Ashley Spellerberg
- Children: 4
- Education: University of Alabama, Birmingham (BS)

Joseph Lawrence Spellerberg (born March 19, 1990) is an American politician who has served as the Nebraska State Treasurer since November 6, 2025. He previously served as the mayor of Fremont, Nebraska, from 2020 to 2025, succeeded by Dev Sookram.

Spellerberg attended the University of Alabama at Birmingham, where he earned a degree in marketing.

Spellerberg was appointed by Nebraska Governor Jim Pillen to be the Nebraska State Treasurer and took office on November 6, 2025.

Political offices
Preceded by Tom Briese	Treasurer of Nebraska; 2025–present	Incumbent
