= Jim Pillen =

Governor of Nebraska since 2023

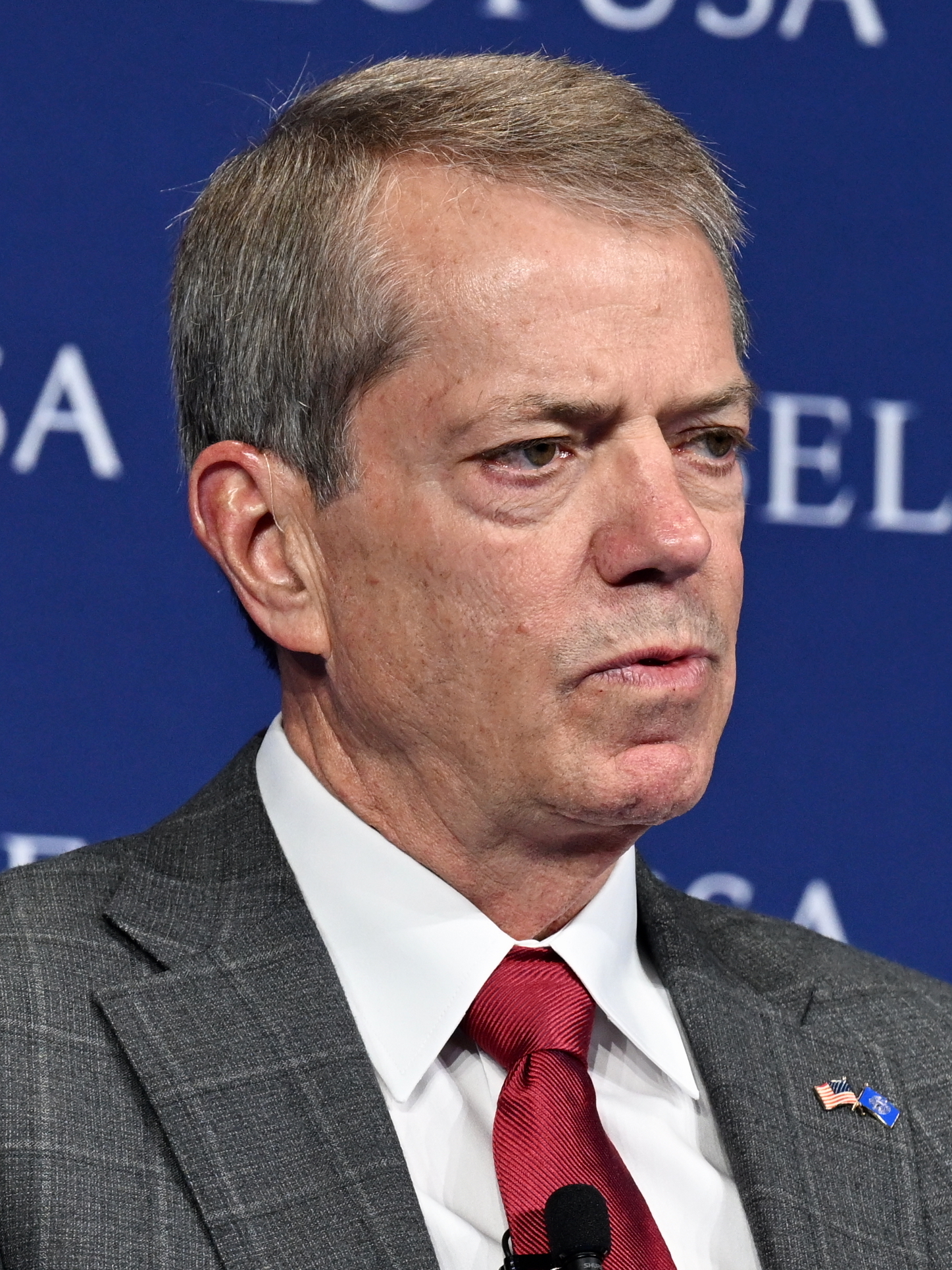
- Pillen in 2026

41st Governor of Nebraska
- Incumbent
- Assumed office January 5, 2023
- Lieutenant: Joe Kelly
- Preceded by: Pete Ricketts

Personal details
- Born: December 31, 1955 (age 70) Columbus, Nebraska, U.S.
- Party: Republican
- Spouse: Suzanne Pillen
- Children: 4
- Education: University of Nebraska–Lincoln (BS); Kansas State University (DVM)
- Website: Office website Campaign website
- Football career

No. 29
- Position: Defensive back

Career information
- High school: Lakeview (Columbus, Nebraska)
- College: Nebraska (1975–1978)

Awards and highlights
- First-team All-Big Eight (1978)

Other information
- Jim Pillen's voice Jim Pillen speaks to service members at the Offutt Air Force Base. Recorded October 31, 2024

James Douglas Pillen (born December 31, 1955) is an American veterinarian and politician serving as the 41st and current governor of Nebraska since 2023. A member of the Republican Party, Pillen served on the University of Nebraska Board of Regents from 2013 to 2023.

== Early life and education ==
Pillen was born in Columbus, Nebraska, to Dale and Dorothy Pillen. His parents were farmers. Dale Pillen served in the United States Army during the Korean War. He died at a Columbus hospital in 1999 at age 72. His grandfather immigrated to the United States from Germany and later served in the U.S. military during World War I.

After graduating from Lakeview Junior-Senior High School in 1974, Pillen earned a Bachelor of Science degree in animal science from the University of Nebraska–Lincoln and a Doctor of Veterinary Medicine from the Kansas State University College of Veterinary Medicine.

From 1975 to 1978, Pillen was a defensive back for the Nebraska Cornhuskers football team under Tom Osborne. He was inducted into the Nebraska Football Hall of Fame in 2004.

== Career ==
Pillen is a practicing veterinarian and also works as chair of Pillen Family Farms. The business, which employs members of Pillen's family, acquired DNA Genetics in 2003. Pillen has also worked as president of the Columbus Area Chamber of Commerce and chaired the Columbus Community Hospital Board of Directors. He has served on the University of Nebraska Board of Regents (which governs the University of Nebraska System) since 2012, and as vice-chair and chair in 2018 and 2020, respectively.

Pillen was the Republican nominee in the 2022 Nebraska gubernatorial election. During the Republican primary election, he refused to debate his primary rivals. Pillen was endorsed by incumbent governor Pete Ricketts and former governor Kay A. Orr. In a crowded field of primary candidates, Pillen won the nomination with about 33.75% of the vote, defeating Charles Herbster (who received 30.13%), Brett Lindstrom (25.68%), and Theresa Thibodeau (6.05%). Pillen's running mate was former U.S. Attorney Joseph P. Kelly. Pillen campaigned on opposing abortion and critical race theory. In the general election, he refused to debate the Democratic nominee, Carol Blood.

Pillen was elected governor with 59.2% of the vote to Blood's 36.0% and Libertarian nominee Scott Zimmerman's 3.9%. He took office on January 5, 2023. One week after being sworn in, he appointed his predecessor, Pete Ricketts, to the United States Senate seat left vacant by the resignation of Ben Sasse to become president of the University of Florida.

== Governor of Nebraska ==
=== Elections ===
2022

Final results by county in 2022: Jim Pillen: 80–90%; 70–80%; 60–70%; 50–60%; Carol Blood: 40–50%; 50–60%

Incumbent Republican governor Pete Ricketts was term-limited and unable to seek a third term. Pillen won the gubernatorial election by a 23-point margin.

Nebraska's primary elections were held on May 10. Pillen won the Republican nomination, while state senator Carol Blood won the Democratic nomination.

The race took on increased importance in October 2022, when U.S. senator Ben Sasse announced he would resign and Ricketts said he would allow the winner of the 2022 gubernatorial election to appoint Sasse's replacement. Pillen appointed Ricketts to replace Sasse.

=== Tenure ===
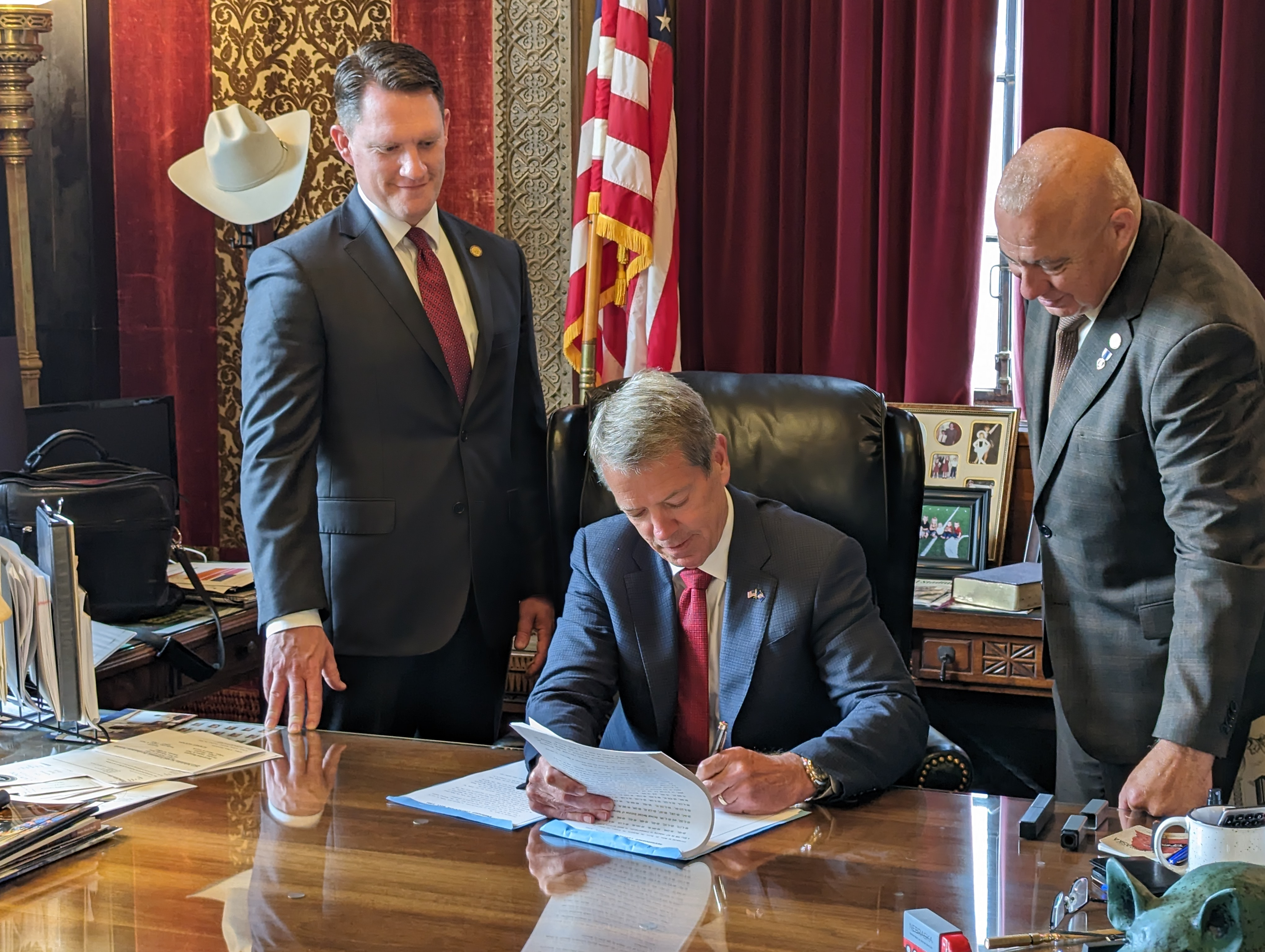
Governor Jim Pillen signs Legislative Bill 514 in his office, implementing photographic voter identification in Nebraska, as Senators Ben Hansen and Tom Brewer look on

In October 2023, Pillen drew criticism when responding to reporting about dangerously high levels of nitrates at his farms. Reporter Yanqi Xu had written that 16 Pillen farms had nitrate levels of at least 50 parts per million, five times the level considered safe to drink. Claiming not to have read Xu's article, he said: "all you've got to do is look at the author. Author's from Communist China—what more do you need to know?" The Asian American Journalists Association issued a statement condemning Pillen's remarks, writing, "Xu, an investigative reporter who grew up in China, deserves to do her job without being judged because of her nationality."

After announcing his intent to do so in his closing address to the 108th Legislature at its April adjournment, Pillen called a special session of the legislature in late July to address property taxes. A number of state senators expressed frustration at the call for a special session and with the proposals presented, some of which were introduced at Pillen's request.

On August 19, 2025, Pillen and U.S. Secretary of Homeland Security Kristi Noem announced that an immigration detention center called Cornhusker Clink would be established in McCook, Nebraska. The facility is planned to include 280 beds and will be in the Work Ethic Camp, a minimum-security prison labor camp in McCook. Development came after the Trump administration pushed other immigration detention centers, such as Alligator Alcatraz. The announcement immediately drew criticism from many Nebraska lawmakers and the Nebraska ACLU.

Pillen was criticized for repeatedly referring to liberals as "libtards" during a January 20, 2026, telephone town hall. He did not respond to media inquiries about his use of the pejorative.

In September 2026, The New York Times and The Flatwater Free Press, an independent, nonprofit newsroom in Nebraska, reported that at least twenty hog farms owned by Pillen were employing undocumented immigrants, according to court documents and interviews with current and former workers and managers.

== Personal life ==
Pillen and his wife, Suzanne, have four children and eight grandchildren. Pillen is Catholic. In December 2024, Pillen was hospitalized after sustaining serious but non-life-threatening injuries in a horseback riding accident in Columbus, Nebraska.

== Electoral history ==
=== 2022 election ===
Nebraska gubernatorial Republican primary, 2022
Party	Candidate	Votes	%
Republican	Jim Pillen	91,459	33.9%
Republican	Charles Herbster	80,642	29.9%
Republican	Brett Lindstrom	70,487	26.1%
Republican	Theresa Thibodeau	16,413	6.1%
Republican	Breland Ridenour	4,682	1.7%
Republican	Michael Connely	2,831	1.1%
Republican	Donna Nicole Carpenter	1,533	0.6%
Republican	Lela McNinch	1,192	0.4%
Republican	Troy Wentz	708	0.3%
Write-in		193	0.1%
Total votes		269,947	100.0%

2022 Nebraska gubernatorial election
Party	Candidate	Votes	%	±%
Republican	Jim Pillen; Joe Kelly	398,334	59.22%	+0.22%
Democratic	Carol Blood; Al Davis	242,006	35.98%	−5.02%
Libertarian	Scott Zimmerman; Jason Blumenthal	26,445	3.93%	N/A
Write-in		5,798	0.86%	N/A
Total votes		672,593	100.00%	
Turnout		682,716	54.93%	
Registered electors		1,242,930		
Republican hold				

Party political offices
Preceded by Pete Ricketts	Republican nominee for Governor of Nebraska; 2022, 2026	Most recent
Political offices
Preceded by Pete Ricketts	Governor of Nebraska; 2023–present	Incumbent
U.S. order of precedence (ceremonial)
Preceded by JD Vance as Vice President	Order of precedence of the United States; Within Nebraska	Succeeded by Mayor of city in which event is held
Preceded by JD Vance as Vice President	Order of precedence of the United States; Within Nebraska	Succeeded by Otherwise Mike Johnson as Speaker of the House
Preceded by Joe Lombardo as Governor of Nevada	Order of precedence of the United States; Outside Nebraska	Succeeded by Jared Polis as Governor of Colorado
