= 2022 United States state treasurer elections =

- November 8, 2022

28 state treasurer offices (Note: Seat tallies and popular vote do not include states that do not elect state treasurers or territorial state treasurers.)
	Majority party	Minority party
Party	Republican	Democratic
Seats before	22	15 (Note: Kansas Governor Laura Kelly appointed Democrat Lynn Rogers replacing Republican Jake LaTurner who resigned.)
Seats after	25	12
Seat change	▲3	▼3
Popular vote	33,912,478	29,864,117
Percentage	51.98%	45.77%
Seats up	14	14
Seats won	17	11
- Republican hold Republican gain Democratic hold No election

The 2022 United States state treasurer elections were held on November 8, 2022, to elect the state treasurer and equivalents in twenty-seven states, plus a special election in Utah. The previous elections for this group of states took place in 2018. The treasurer of Vermont serves two-year terms and was last elected in 2020.

These elections took place concurrently with several other federal, state, and local elections. They were one of only two slates of statewide elections in 2022 in which the Republicans made net gains, the other being the state auditor elections.

Republicans had a net gain of 3 seats in these elections, flipping Wiscosin, Kansas and Iowa.

== Partisan composition ==
Going into the election, there were 22 Republican state treasurers and 20 Democratic treasurers. This class of treasurers were made of 14 Democrats and 14 Republicans.

Democrats defended two states won by Donald Trump, and Republicans defended one state won by Joe Biden in 2020. Additionally, Democrats held state treasurer offices in three states with Republican governors, while Republicans did not hold any state treasurer offices in states with Democratic governors.

== Race summary ==
=== States ===
State	State treasurer	Party	First elected	Last race	Status	Candidates
Alabama	Young Boozer	Republican	2021 (Note: Boozer took office after his predecessor (John McMillan) resigned.)	97.1% R (Note: McMillan was elected unopposed except for write-ins.)	Incumbent re-elected.	▌ ✓ Young Boozer (Republican) 83.7%; ▌Scott Hammond (Libertarian) 15.5%
Arizona	Kimberly Yee	Republican	2018	54.3% R	Incumbent re-elected.	▌ ✓ Kimberly Yee (Republican) 55.7%; ▌Martín Quezada (Democratic) 44.3%
Arkansas	Dennis Milligan	Republican	2014	70.9% R	Incumbent term-limited New treasurer elected. Republican hold.	▌ ✓ Mark Lowery (Republican) 66.3%; ▌Pam Whitaker (Democratic) 33.7%
California	Fiona Ma	Democratic	2018	64.1% D	Incumbent re-elected.	▌ ✓ Fiona Ma (Democratic) 58.8%; ▌Jack Guerrero (Republican) 41.2%
Colorado	Dave Young	Democratic	2018	52.2% D	Incumbent re-elected.	▌ ✓ Dave Young (Democratic) 53.7%; ▌Lang Sias (Republican) 43.0%; ▌Anthony Delgado (Libertarian) 3.3%
Connecticut	Shawn Wooden	Democratic	2018	55.1% D	Incumbent retired. New treasurer elected. Democratic hold.	▌ ✓ Erick Russell (Democratic) 52.4%; ▌Harry Arora (Republican) 44.9%; ▌Jennifer Baldwin (Independent Party) 2.0%; ▌JoAnna Laiscell (Libertarian) 0.7%
Delaware	Colleen Davis	Democratic	2018	52.4% D	Incumbent re-elected.	▌ ✓ Colleen Davis (Democratic) 53.6%; ▌Greg Coverdale (Republican) 46.4%
Florida	Jimmy Patronis	Republican	2017 (Note: Patronis took office after his predecessor (Jeff Atwater) resigned. He was subsequently elected in the 2018 Florida Chief Financial Officer election.)	51.7% R	Incumbent re-elected.	▌ ✓ Jimmy Patronis (Republican) 59.5%; ▌Adam Hattersley (Democratic) 40.5%
Idaho	Julie Ellsworth	Republican	2018	100% R (Note: Ellsworth ran unopposed.)	Incumbent re-elected.	▌ ✓ Julie Ellsworth (Republican) 71.1%; ▌Deborah Silver (Democratic) 28.9%
Illinois	Mike Frerichs	Democratic	2014	57.6% D	Incumbent re-elected	▌ ✓ Mike Frerichs (Democratic) 54.3%; ▌Tom Demmer (Republican) 43.5%; ▌Preston Nelson (Libertarian) 2.2%
Indiana	Kelly Mitchell	Republican	2014	58.6% R	Incumbent term-limited. New treasurer elected. Republican hold.	▌ ✓ Daniel Elliott (Republican) 60.9%; ▌Jessica McClellan (Democratic) 39.1%
Iowa	Michael Fitzgerald	Democratic	1982	54.8% D	Incumbent lost re-election. New treasurer elected. Republican gain.	▌ ✓ Roby Smith (Republican) 51.3%; ▌Michael Fitzgerald (Democratic) 48.7%
Kansas	Lynn Rogers	Democratic	2021 (Note: Rogers was appointed after his predecessor (Jake LaTurner) resigned.)	57.8% R	Interim appointee lost election. New treasurer elected. Republican gain.	▌ ✓ Steven Johnson (Republican) 54.0%; ▌Lynn Rogers (Democratic) 41.4%; ▌Steve Roberts (Libertarian) 4.6%
Massachusetts	Deb Goldberg	Democratic	2014	67.6% D	Incumbent re-elected.	▌ ✓ Deb Goldberg (Democratic) 76.5%; ▌Cristina Crawford (Libertarian) 23.1%
Nebraska	John Murante	Republican	2018	100% R (Note: Murante ran unopposed.)	Incumbent re-elected.	▌ ✓ John Murante (Republican) 72.2%; ▌Katrina Tomsen (Libertarian) 27.8%
Nevada	Zach Conine	Democratic	2018	47.7% R	Incumbent re-elected.	▌ ✓ Zach Conine (Democratic) 47.7%; ▌Michele Fiore (Republican) 46.0%; Others: ▌None of These Candidates 2.8%; ▌Margaret Hendrickson (Independent American) 1.9%; ▌Bryan Elliott (Libertarian) 1.6%
New Mexico	Tim Eichenberg	Democratic	2014	52.5% D	Incumbent term-limited. New treasurer elected. Democratic hold.	▌ ✓ Laura Montoya (Democratic) 53.15%; ▌Harry Montoya (Republican) 46.85%
New York	Thomas DiNapoli	Democratic	2007 (Note: DiNapoli took office in 2007 after his predecessor (Alan Hevesi) resigned. He was subsequently elected in the 2010 New York State Comptroller election.)	66.9% D	Incumbent re-elected.	▌ ✓ Thomas DiNapoli (Democratic) 57.3%; ▌Paul Rodriguez (Republican) 42.7%
Ohio	Robert Sprague	Republican	2018	53.3% R	Incumbent re-elected.	▌ ✓ Robert Sprague (Republican) 58.6%; ▌Scott Schertzer (Democratic) 41.4%
Oklahoma	Randy McDaniel	Republican	2018	71.6% R	Incumbent retired. New treasurer elected. Republican hold.	▌ ✓ Todd Russ (Republican) 64.8%; ▌Charles De Coune (Democratic) 30.7%; ▌Gregory Sadler (Libertarian) 4.5%
Rhode Island	Seth Magaziner	Democratic	2014	64.9% D	Incumbent term-limited. New treasurer elected. Democratic hold.	▌ ✓ James Diossa (Democratic) 54.3%; ▌James Lathrop (Republican) 45.5%
South Carolina	Curtis Loftis	Republican	2010	56.0% R	Incumbent re-elected.	▌ ✓ Curtis Loftis (Republican) 79.7%; ▌Sarah Work (Alliance) 19.9%
South Dakota	Josh Haeder	Republican	2018	62.3% R	Incumbent re-elected.	▌ ✓ Josh Haeder (Republican) 67.0%; ▌John Cunningham (Democratic) 33.0%
Texas	Glenn Hegar	Republican	2014	53.2% R	Incumbent re-elected.	▌ ✓ Glenn Hegar (Republican) 56.4%; ▌Janet Dudding (Democratic) 40.9%; ▌Alonzo Echavarria-Garza (Libertarian) 2.7%
Utah (special)	Marlo Oaks	Republican	2021 (Note: Oaks was appointed after his predecessor (David Damschen) resigned.)	74.6% R	Interim appointee elected. Republican hold.	▌ ✓ Marlo Oaks (Republican) 74.1%; ▌Joseph Buchman (Libertarian) 9.9; ▌Thomas Horne (United Utah) 9.6%; ▌Warren Rogers (Independent American) 6.4%
Vermont	Beth Pearce	Democratic	2010	53.2% D	Incumbent retired. New treasurer elected. Democratic hold.	▌ ✓ Mike Pieciak (Democratic) 62.5%; ▌H. Brooke Paige (Republican) 32.7%
Wisconsin	Sarah Godlewski	Democratic	2018	50.9% D	Incumbent retired to run for United States Senate. New treasurer elected. Republican gain.	▌ ✓ John Leiber (Republican) 49.6%; ▌Aaron Richardson (Democratic) 48.1%; ▌Andrew Zuelke (Constitution) 2.2%
Wyoming	Curt Meier	Republican	2018	72.1% R	Incumbent re-elected.	▌ ✓ Curt Meier (Republican)

== Closest races ==
States where the margin of victory was under 5%:

1. Nevada, 1.7%
2. Wisconsin, 1.5%
3. Iowa, 2.9%

States where the margin of victory was under 10%:

1. New Mexico, 6.3%
2. Delaware, 7.2%
3. Connecticut, 7.5%
4. Rhode Island, 8.8%

Blue denotes races won by Democrats. Red denotes races won by Republicans.

== Alabama ==
Alabama State Treasurer election
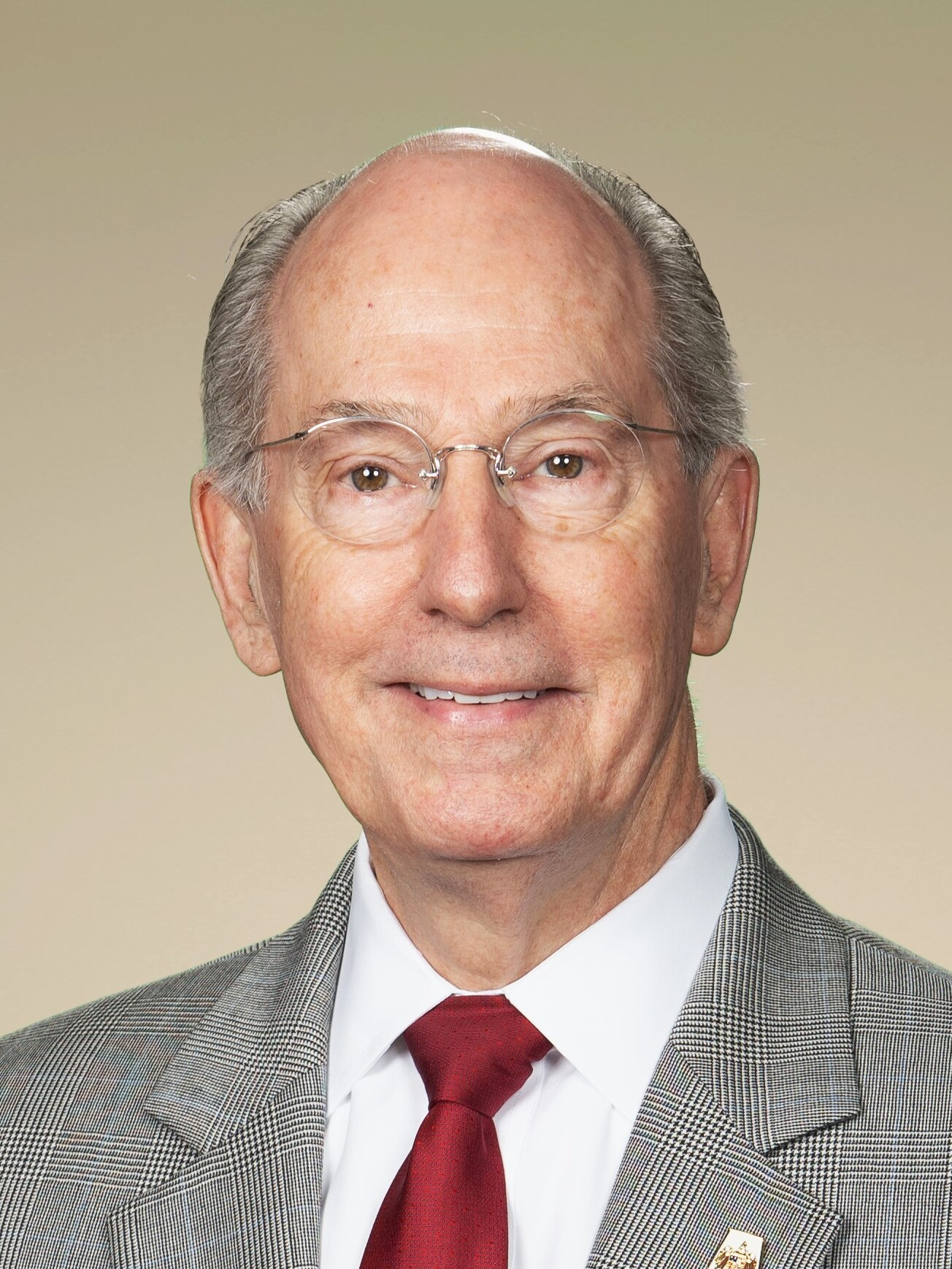

Nominee	Young Boozer	Scott Hammond
Party	Republican	Libertarian
Popular vote	946,936	175,034
Percentage	83.7%	15.5%
- County results Boozer: 50–60% 60–70% 70–80% 80–90% >90%
State Treasurer before election
Young Boozer
Republican
Elected State Treasurer
Young Boozer
Republican

Incumbent Republican Young Boozer, who was appointed to the position October 1, 2021 after the previous treasurer, John McMillan, resigned, ran for election to a full term. Boozer previously served as Alabama State Treasurer from 2011 to 2019. He won the general election in a landslide.

Boozer won his primary on May 24, and easily won the general election.

== Arizona ==
Arizona State Treasurer election
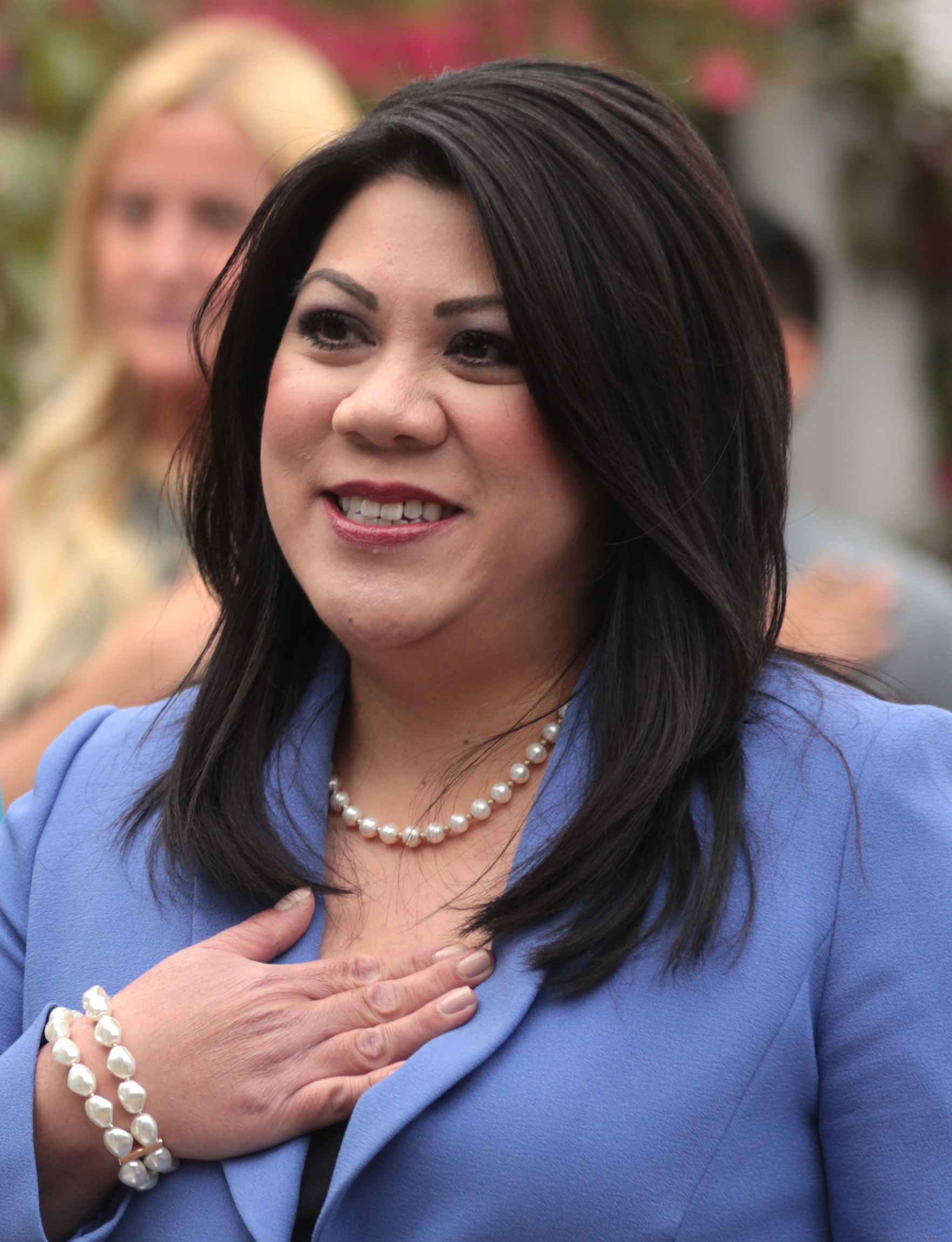

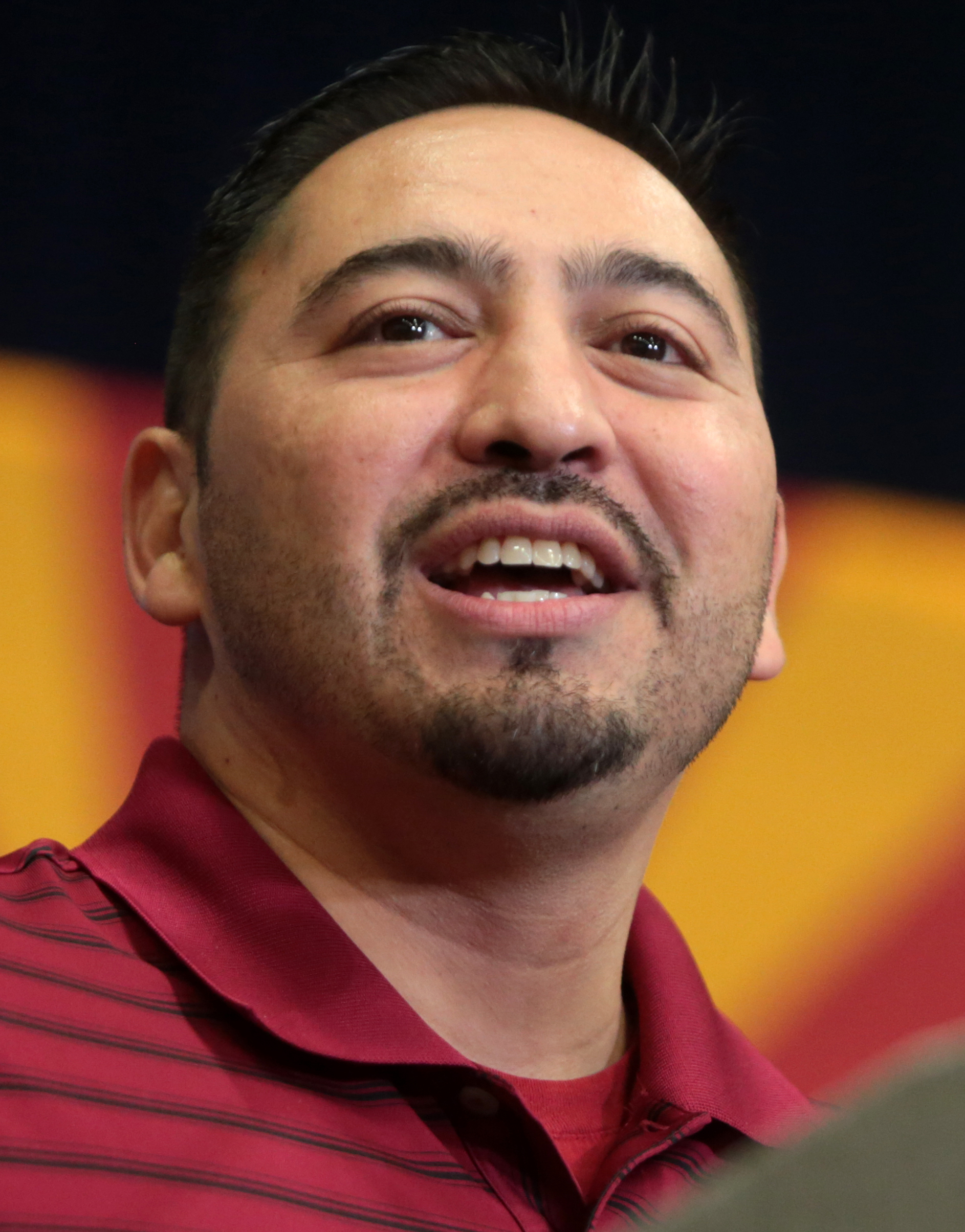
Nominee	Kimberly Yee	Martín Quezada
Party	Republican	Democratic
Popular vote	1,390,135	1,107,036
Percentage	55.7%	44.3%
- County results Yee: 50–60% 60–70% 70–80% Quezada: 50–60% 60–70%
Treasurer before election
Kimberly Yee
Republican
Elected Treasurer
Kimberly Yee
Republican

Incumbent Republican Kimberly Yee initially ran for governor, but suspended her campaign on January 15, 2022, and instead ran for re-election. State representative Jeff Weninger challenged Yee in the Republican primary, as did former Arizona Republican Party treasurer Bob Lettieri.

The only Democratic candidate was state senator Martín Quezada.

Yee and Quezada won their respective primaries on August 2, 2022.

Yee easily won re-election.

== Arkansas ==
Arkansas State Treasurer election
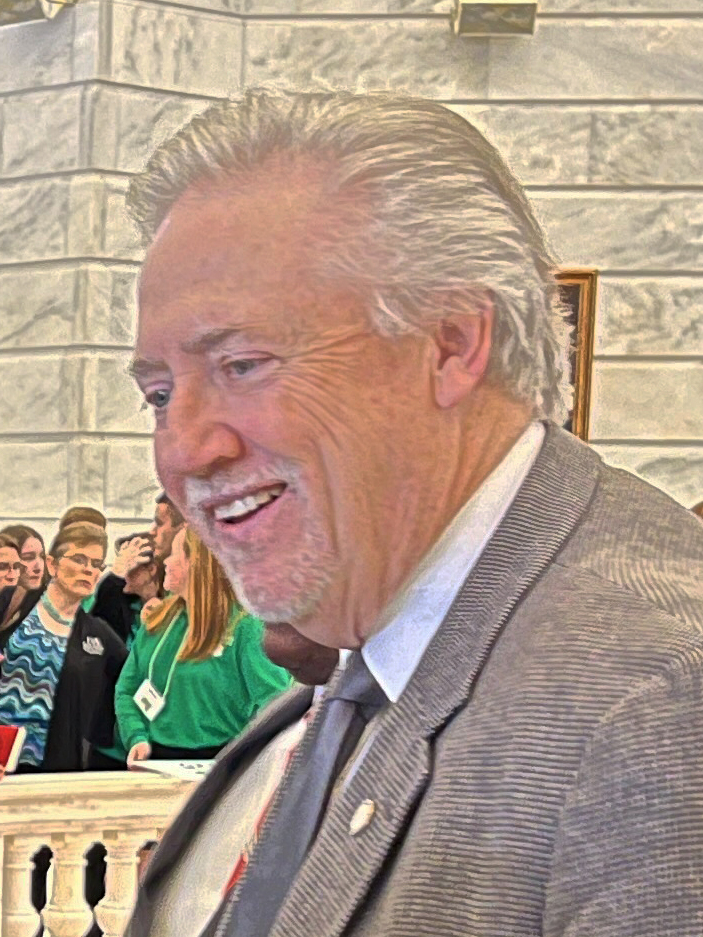

Nominee	Mark Lowery	Pam Whitaker
Party	Republican	Democratic
Popular vote	592,630	301,600
Percentage	66.3%	33.7%
- County Results; Lowery: 50-60% 60-70% 70-80% 80-90% Whitaker: 50-60%
State Treasurer before election
Dennis Milligan
Republican
Elected State Treasurer
Mark Lowery
Republican

Incumbent Republican Dennis Milligan was term-limited and cannot seek a third term.

Republican candidates included State senator Mathew Pitsch and state representative Mark Lowery. The only Democratic candidate is Pam Whitaker.

Lowery and Whitaker won their respective primaries on May 24.

Lowery won the general election in a landslide.

== California ==
California State Treasurer election
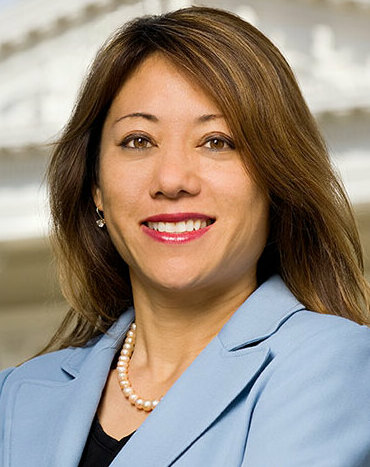

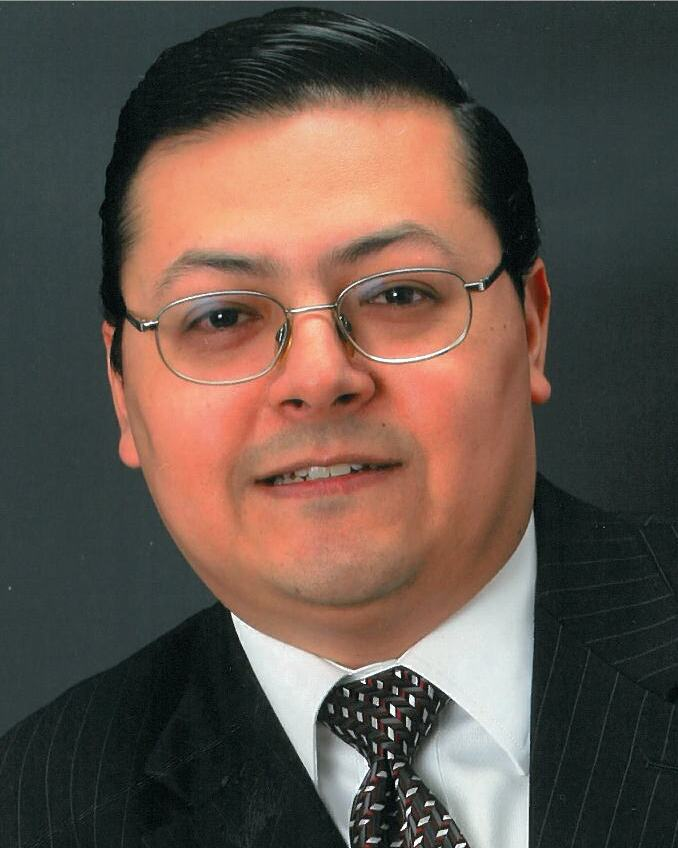
Candidate	Fiona Ma	Jack Guerrero
Party	Democratic	Republican
Popular vote	6,287,071	4,405,777
Percentage	58.8%	41.2%
- County results Ma: 50–60% 60–70% 70–80% 80–90% Guerrero: 50–60% 60–70% 70–80%
Treasurer before election
Fiona Ma
Democratic
Elected Treasurer
Fiona Ma
Democratic

Incumbent Democrat Fiona Ma won re-election, defeating Republican councilmember and economist Jack M. Guerrero.

Ma and Guerrero advanced from the nonpartisan blanket primary on June 7.

== Colorado ==
Colorado State Treasurer election
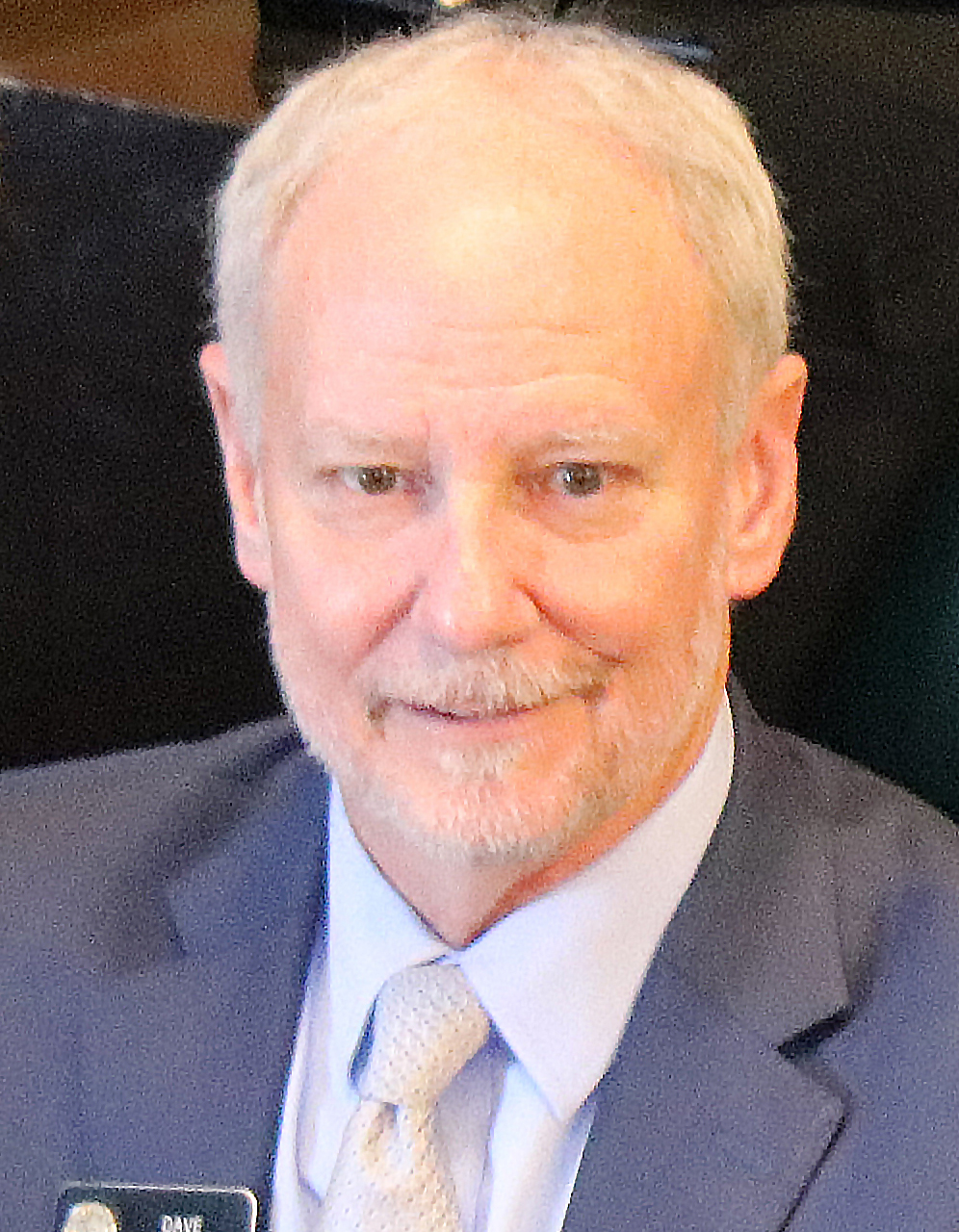

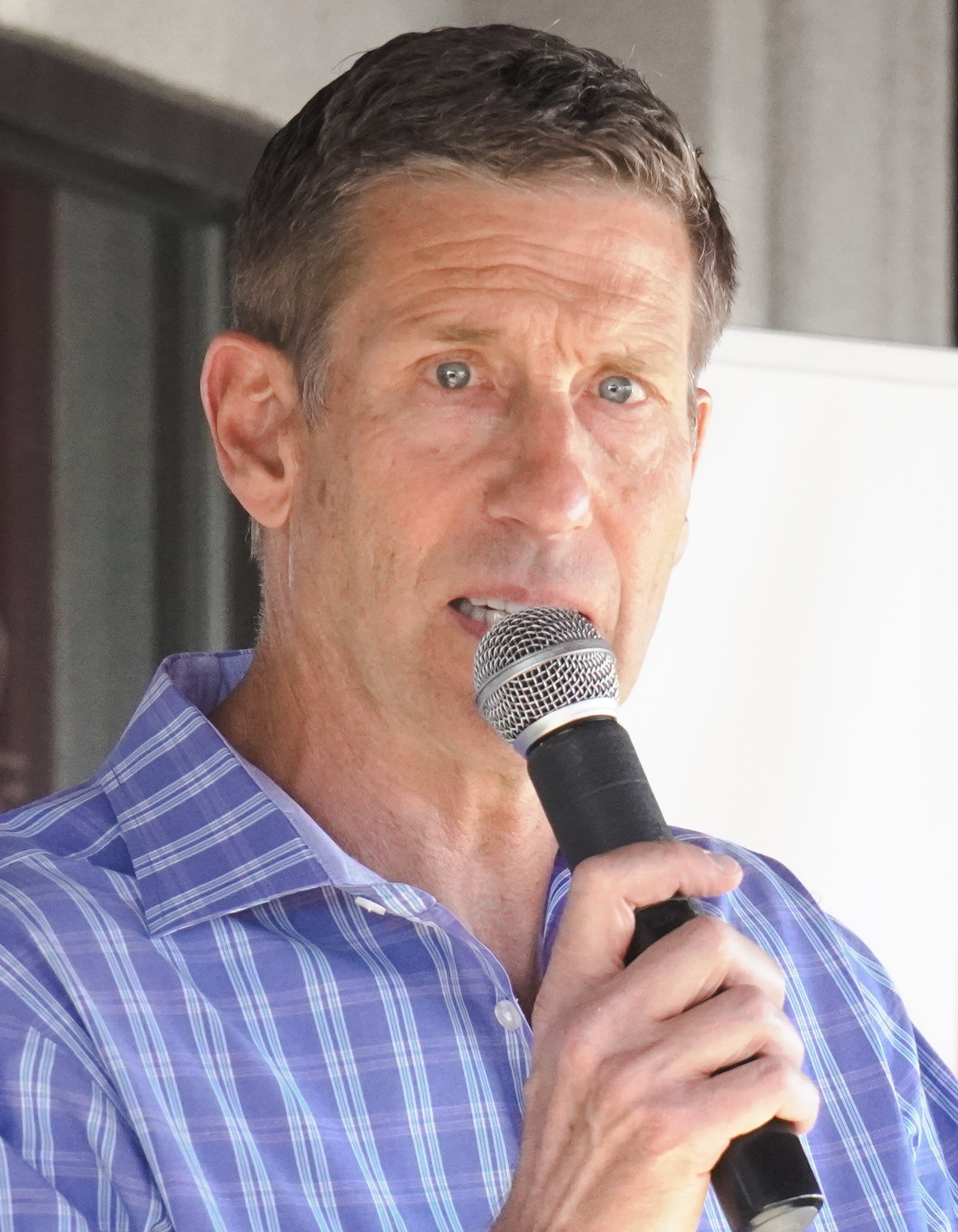
Nominee	Dave Young	Lang Sias
Party	Democratic	Republican
Popular vote	1,312,705	1,052,337
Percentage	53.7%	43.0%
- County results Young: 40–50% 50–60% 60–70% 70–80% Sias: 40–50% 50–60% 60–70% 70–80% 80–90%
State Treasurer before election
Dave Young
Democratic
Elected State Treasurer
Dave Young
Democratic

Incumbent Democrat Dave Young won re-election, defeating Republican Lang Sias, former state representative and Republican nominee for lieutenant governor in 2018.

Young and Sias won their respective primaries on June 28.

== Connecticut ==
Connecticut State Treasurer election
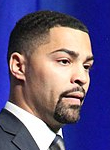

Nominee	Erick Russell	Harry Arora
Party	Democratic	Republican
Popular vote	652,907	559,141
Percentage	52.4%	44.9%
- County results Russell: 40–50% 50–60% Arora: 50–60%
State Treasurer before election
Shawn Wooden
Democratic
Elected State Treasurer
Erick Russell
Democratic

Incumbent Democrat Shawn Wooden retired. Democratic candidates included investment firm COO Dita Bhargava, Connecticut State Board of Education chairwoman Karen DuBois-Walton, and former vice chair of the Democratic Party of Connecticut Erick Russell.

State representative Harry Arora ran unopposed in the Republican primary.

Russell won the Democratic primary on August 9. He also won the general election.

== Delaware ==
Delaware State Treasurer election
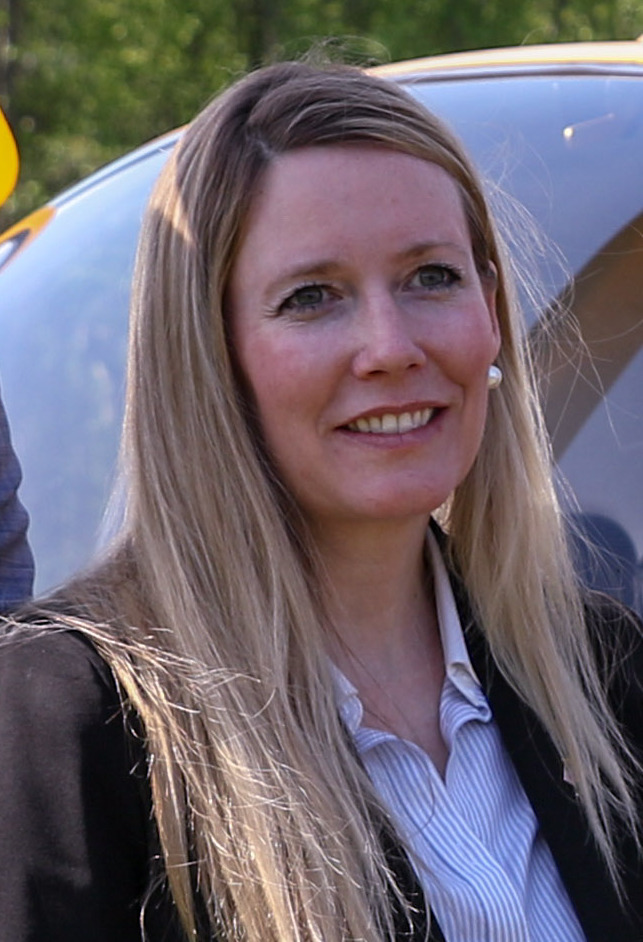

Nominee	Colleen Davis	Greg Coverdale
Party	Democratic	Republican
Popular vote	170,438	147,307
Percentage	53.6%	46.4%
- County results Davis: 60–70% Coverdale: 50–60%
State Treasurer before election
Colleen Davis
Democratic
Elected State Treasurer
Colleen Davis
Democratic

Incumbent Democrat Colleen Davis successfully ran re-election. Republican Greg Coverdale was her opponent.

== Florida ==
Florida Chief Financial Officer election
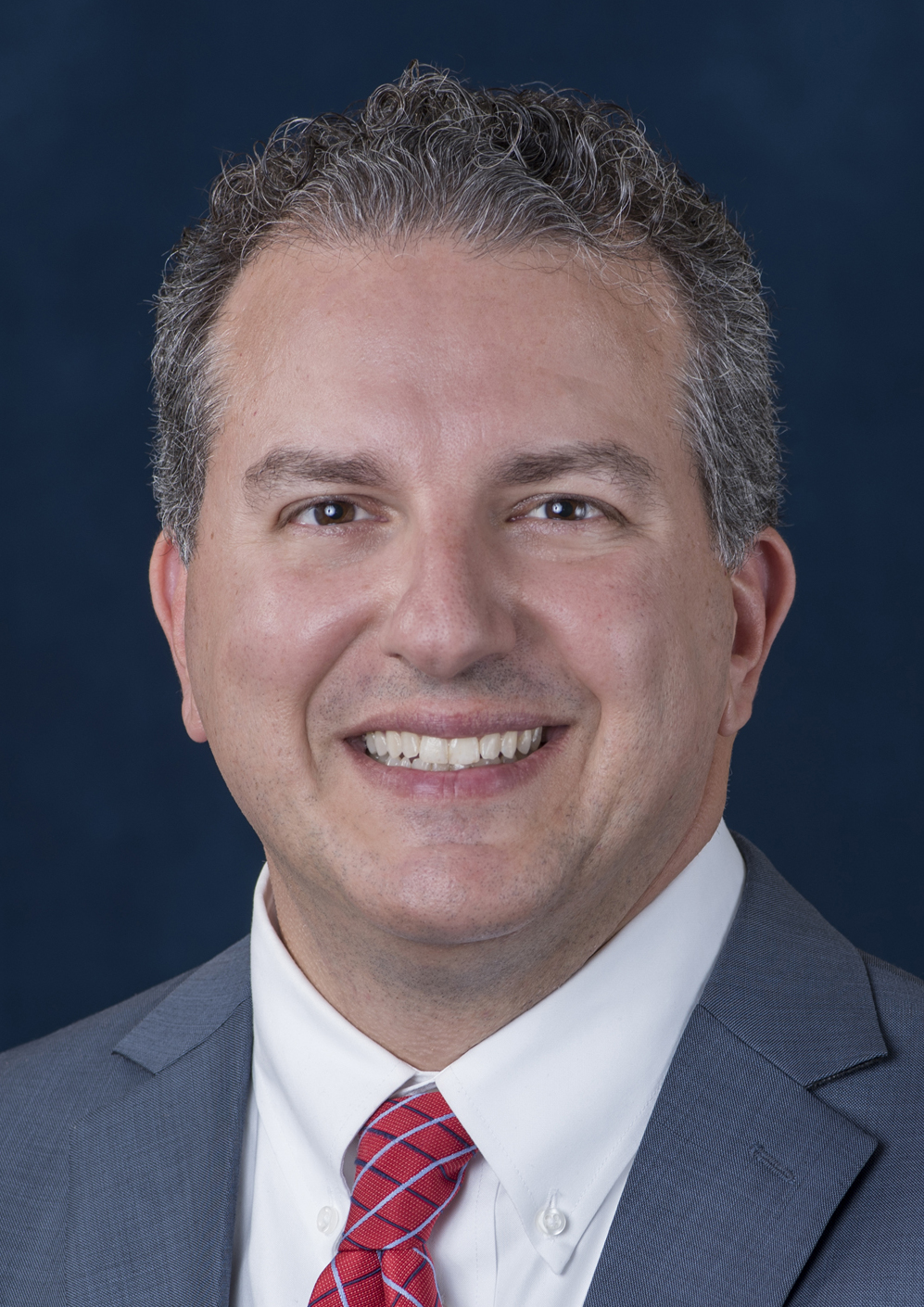

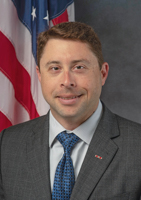
Nominee	Jimmy Patronis	Adam Hattersley
Party	Republican	Democratic
Popular vote	4,528,811	3,085,697
Percentage	59.5%	40.5%
- County results Patronis: 50–60% 60–70% 70–80% 80–90% >90% Hattersley: 50–60% 60–70%
CFO before election
Jimmy Patronis
Republican
Elected CFO
Jimmy Patronis
Republican

Incumbent Republican Jimmy Patronis ran for re-election.

The only Democratic candidate was former state representative Adam Hattersley.

Patronis easily won re-election.

== Idaho ==
Idaho State Treasurer election
- Turnout: 57.2%
Nominee	Julie Ellsworth	Deborah Silver
Party	Republican	Democratic
Popular vote	412,502	167,596
Percentage	71.1%	28.9%
- County results Ellsworth: 50–60% 60–70% 70–80% 80–90% >90% Silver: 40–50% 50–60%
Treasurer before election
Julie Ellsworth
Republican
Elected Treasurer
Julie Ellsworth
Republican

Incumbent Republican Julie Ellsworth successfully ran for re-election. Her only challenger was Democrat Jill L. Ellsworth.

Both Ellsworths won their respective primaries on May 17.

In June, Jill Ellsworth withdrew from the Democratic nomination and was replaced by Deborah Silver on the ballot.

== Illinois ==
Illinois Treasurer election
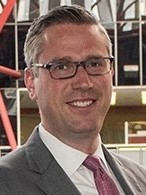

Nominee	Mike Frerichs	Tom Demmer
Party	Democratic	Republican
Popular vote	2,206,434	1,767,242
Percentage	54.3%	43.5%
- County results Frerichs: 40–50% 50–60% 60–70% 70–80% Demmer: 40–50% 50–60% 60–70% 70–80% 80–90%
Treasurer before election
Mike Frerichs
Democratic
Elected Treasurer
Mike Frerichs
Democratic

Incumbent Democrat Mike Frerichs was re-elected. House deputy minority leader Tom Demmer ran against him, as did high school assistant Patrice McDermand.

Frerichs and Demmer won their respective primaries on June 28.

== Indiana ==
Indiana State Treasurer election
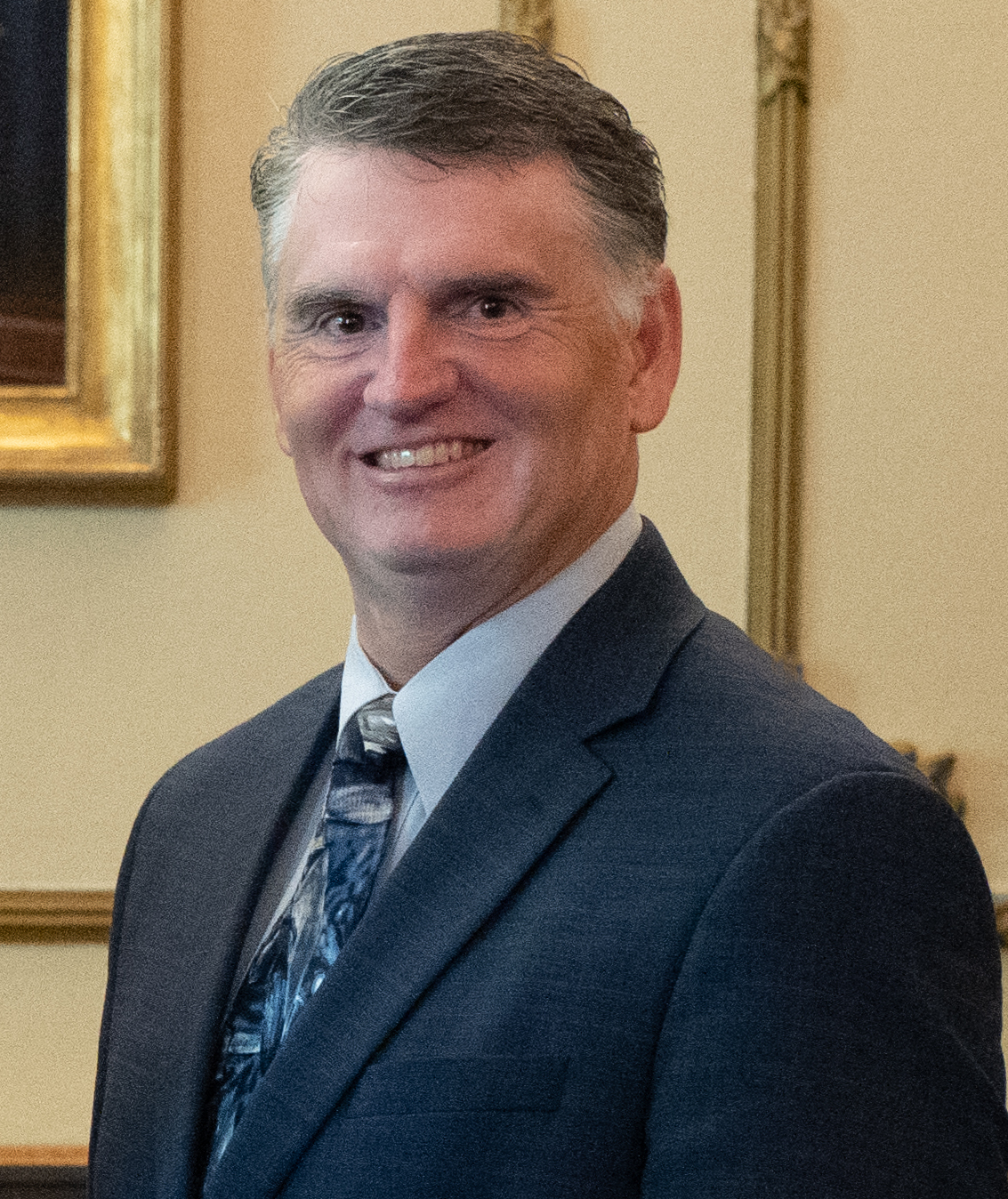

Nominee	Daniel Elliott	Jessica McClellan
Party	Republican	Democratic
Popular vote	1,120,934	720,701
Percentage	60.9%	39.1%
- County results Elliott: 50–60% 60–70% 70–80% 80–90% McClellan: 50–60% 60–70%
State Treasurer before election
Kelly Mitchell
Republican
Elected State Treasurer
Daniel Elliott
Republican

Incumbent Republican Kelly Mitchell was term-limited and cannot seek a third term.

Republican candidates included Morgan County Republican party chair Daniel Elliott, Fort Wayne city clerk Lana Keesling, Boone County council president Elise Nieshalla, and former Indiana Republican Party spokesman Pete Seat.

The only Democratic candidate was Jessica McClellan, the Monroe County treasurer.

Elliott and McClellan won their party conventions on June 18.

Elliott won the general election.

== Iowa ==
Iowa State Treasurer election
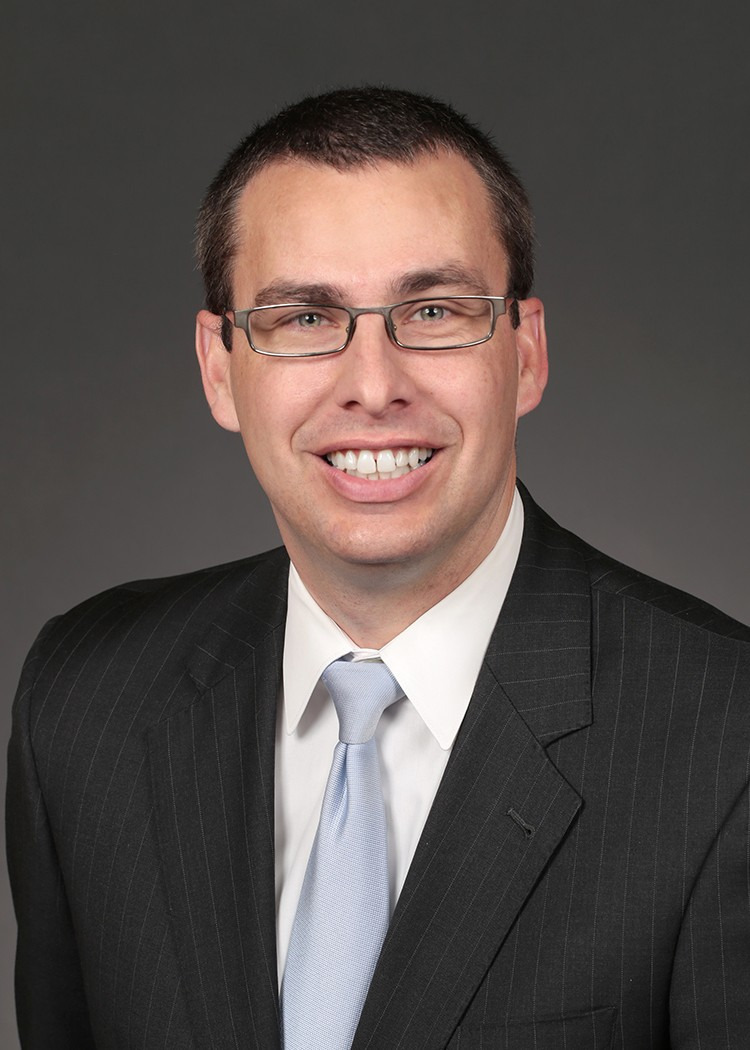

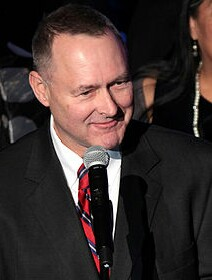
Nominee	Roby Smith	Michael Fitzgerald
Party	Republican	Democratic
Popular vote	614,943	584,021
Percentage	51.3%	48.7%
- County results Smith: 50–60% 60–70% 70–80% 80–90% Fitzgerald: 40–50% 50–60% 60–70% 70–80%
Treasurer before election
Michael Fitzgerald
Democratic
Elected Treasurer
Roby Smith
Republican

Incumbent Democrat Michael Fitzgerald ran for re-election. Republican state senator Roby Smith challenged Fitzgerald.

Fitzgerald and Smith won their respective primaries on June 7.

Republican Smith defeated Democrat Fitzgerald in his re-election bid.

== Kansas ==
Kansas State Treasurer election

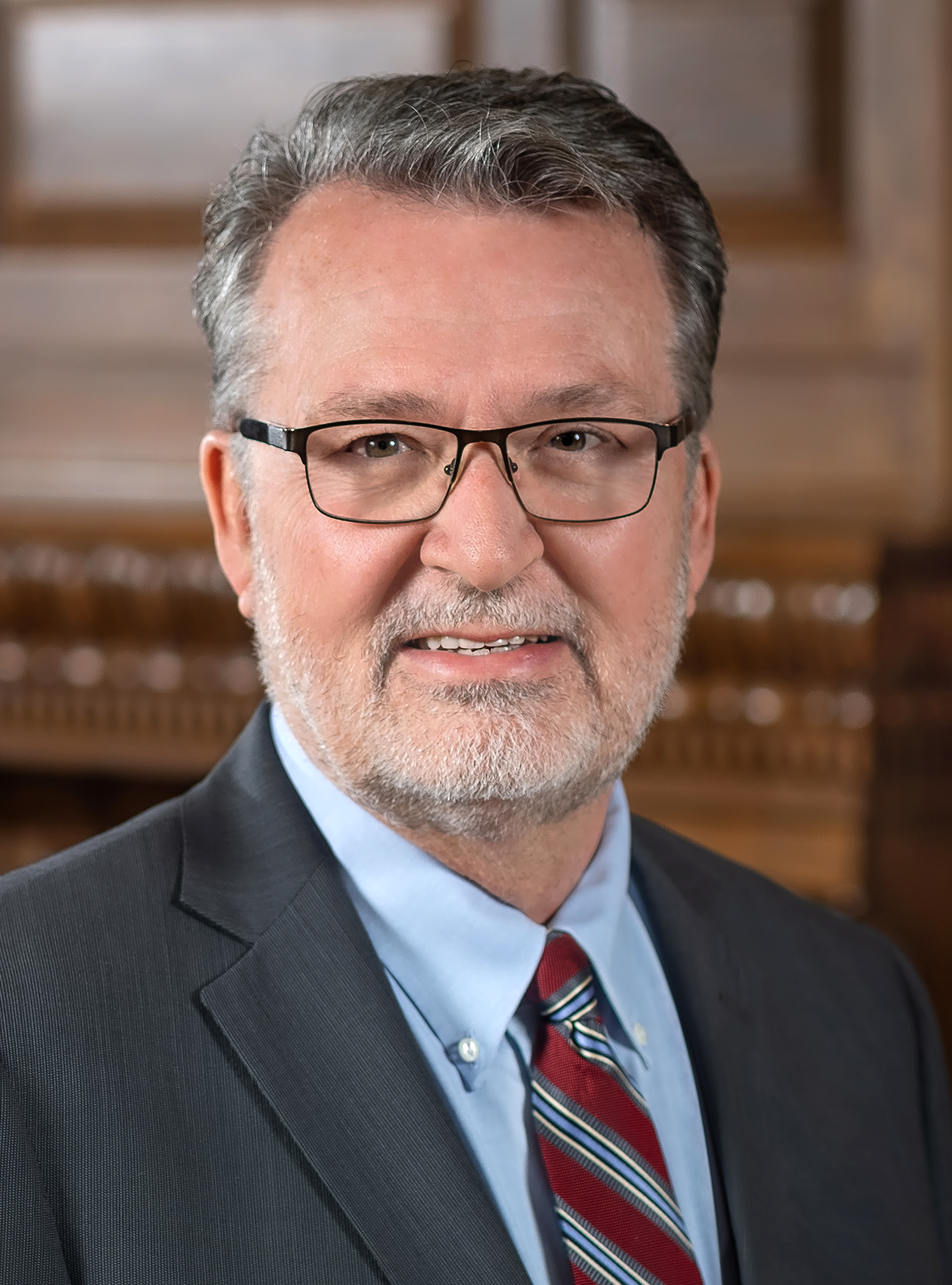
Nominee	Steven Johnson	Lynn Rogers
Party	Republican	Democratic
Popular vote	537,488	411,813
Percentage	54.0%	41.4%
- Johnson: 50–60% 60–70% 70–80% 80–90% >90% Rogers: 40–50% 50–60% 60–70%
State Treasurer before election
Lynn Rogers
Democratic
Elected State Treasurer
Steven Johnson
Republican

Incumbent Democrat Lynn Rogers was appointed January 2, 2021, after his predecessor, Jake LaTurner, resigned when he was elected to Congress. Rogers ran for a full term.

Republican candidates included state representative Steven Johnson and state senator Caryn Tyson.

A recount was triggered in the Republican primary due to a 1% margin between the two candidates. 17 days later, Tyson conceded the race after the recount showed Johnson in the lead.

In the general election, Republican Johnson defeated incumbent Democrat Rogers.

== Massachusetts ==
Massachusetts Treasurer and Receiver-General election
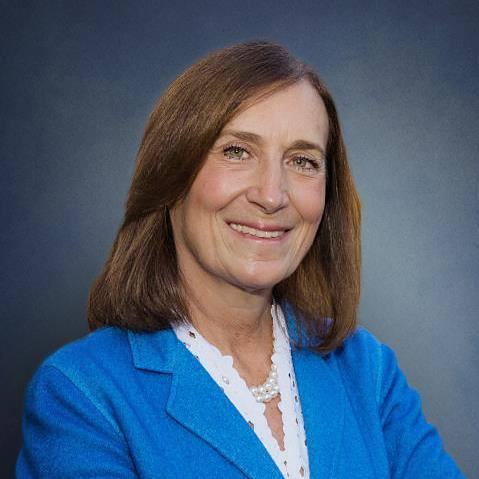

Nominee	Deb Goldberg	Cristina Crawford
Party	Democratic	Libertarian
Popular vote	1,709,555	516,019
Percentage	76.5%	23.1%
- Goldberg: 50–60% 60–70% 70–80% 80–90% >90%
Treasurer before election
Deb Goldberg
Democratic
Elected Treasurer
Deb Goldberg
Democratic

Incumbent Democrat Deb Goldberg ran for re-election, and was challenged by Libertarian Cristina Crawford.

Goldberg won re-election.

== Nebraska ==
2022 Nebraska State Treasurer election
- November 8, 2022
- Turnout: 54.93%
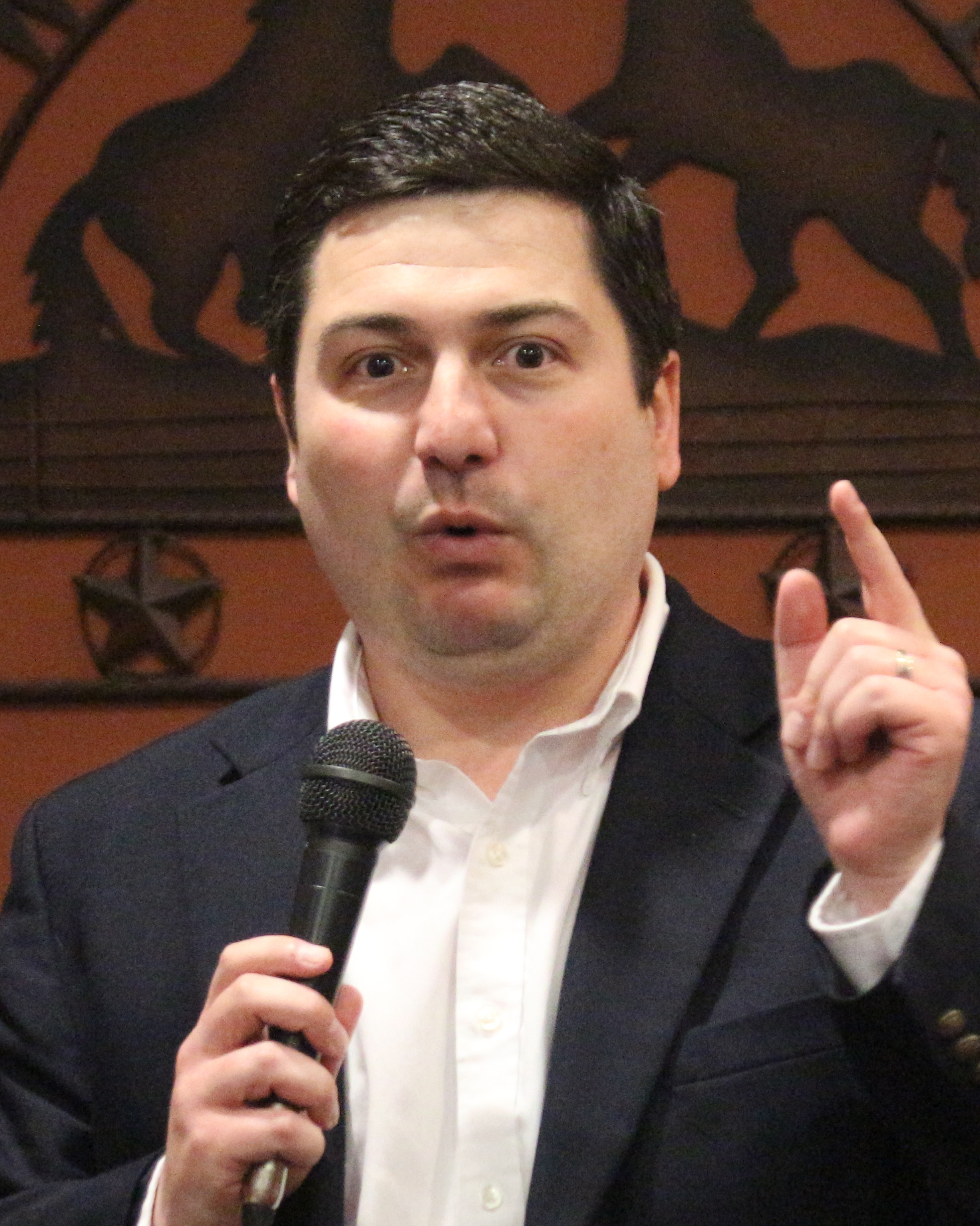

Candidate	John Murante	Katrina Tomsen
Party	Republican	Libertarian
Popular vote	431,193	165,951
Percentage	72.21%	27.79%
- County results Murante: 60-70% 70-80% 80-90% >90%
State Treasurer before election
John Murante
Republican
Elected State Treasurer
John Murante
Republican

Incumbent Republican John Murante successfully ran re-election. He faced a primary challenge from Paul Anderson. Libertarian Katrina Tomsen was his opponent.

Murante won his primary on May 10.

== Nevada ==
Nevada State Treasurer election
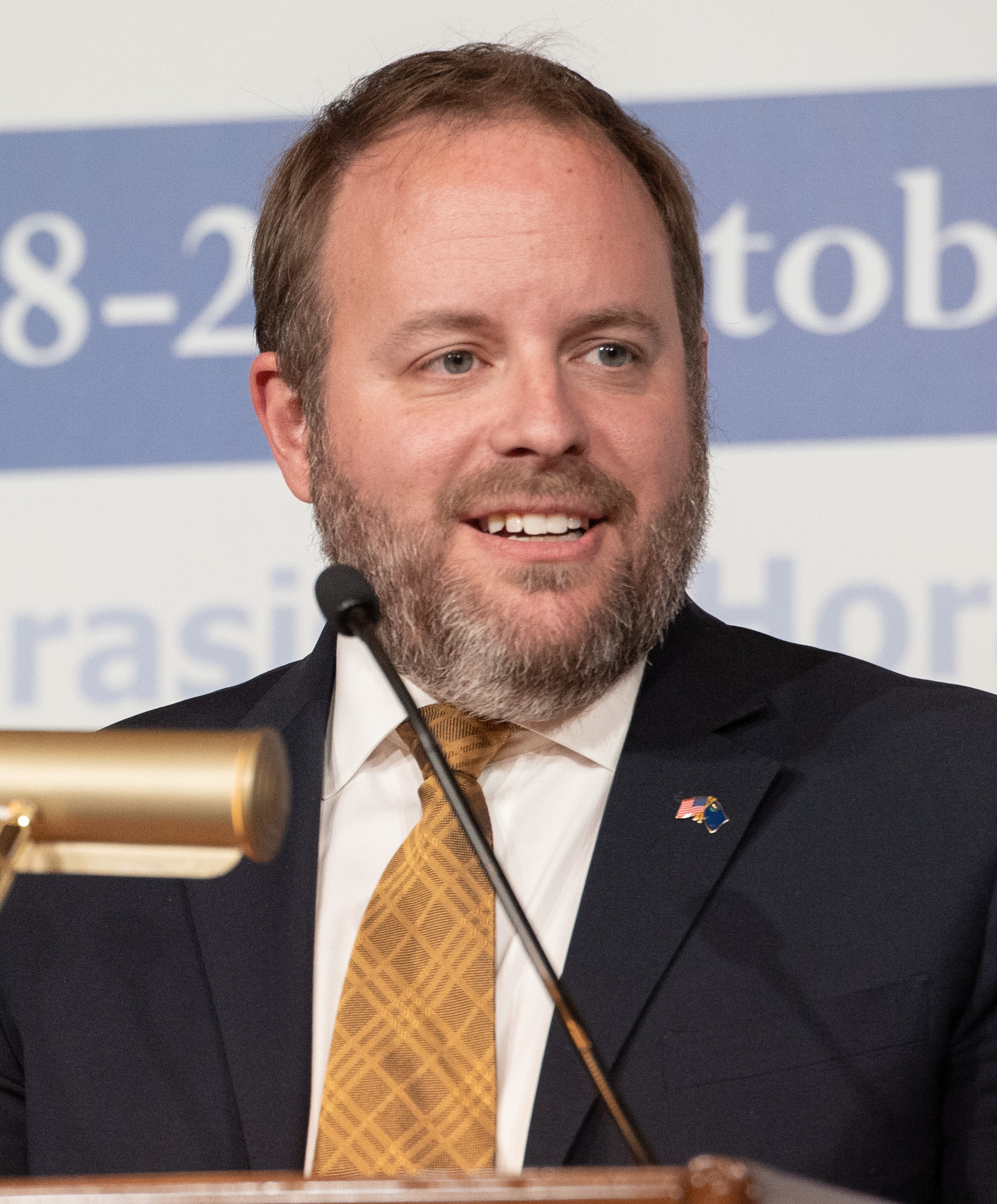

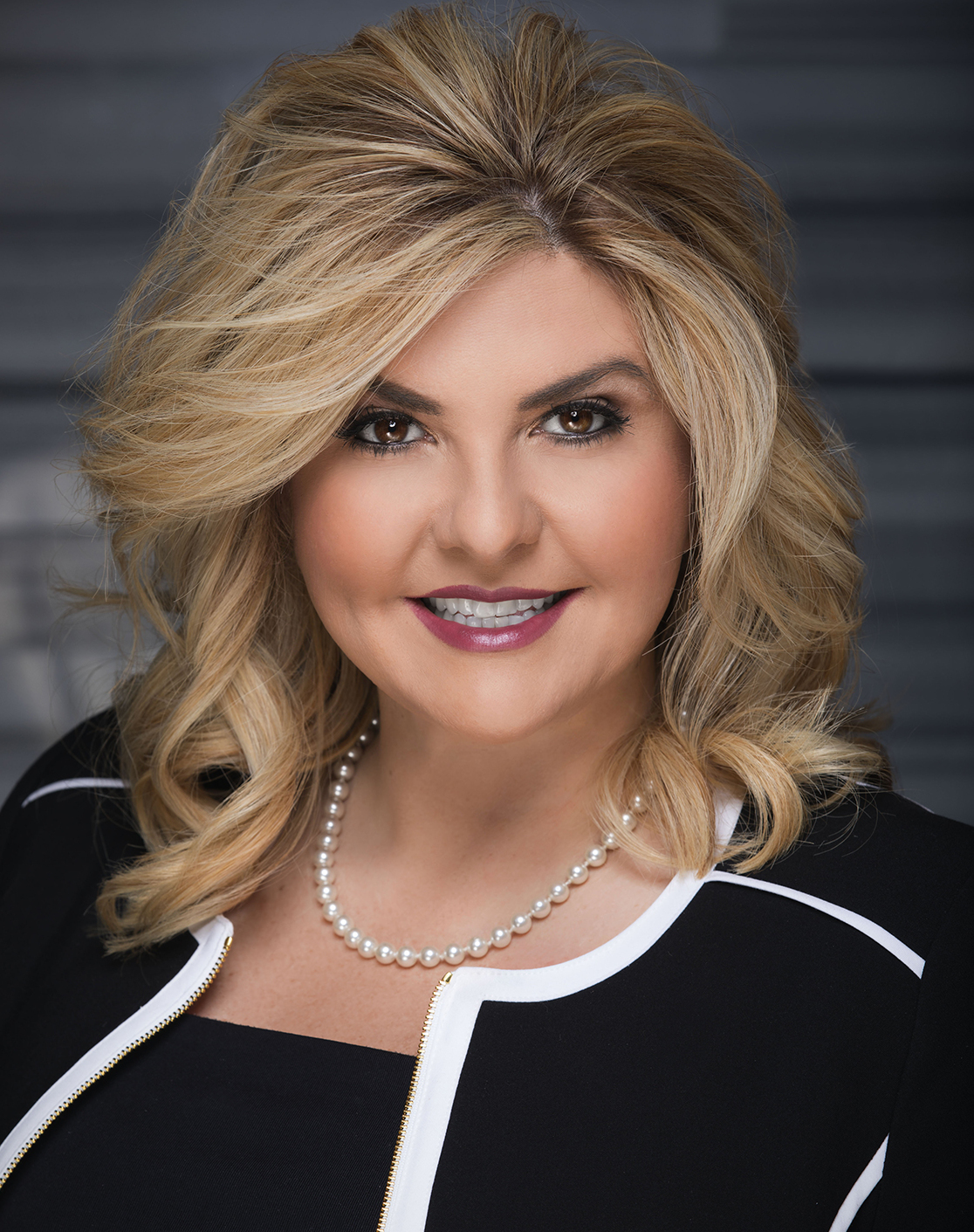
Nominee	Zach Conine	Michele Fiore
Party	Democratic	Republican
Popular vote	482,762	465,570
Percentage	47.7%	46.0%
- County results Conine: 40–50% 50–60% Fiore: 50–60% 60–70% 70–80% 80–90%
Treasurer before election
Zach Conine
Democratic
Elected Treasurer
Zach Conine
Democratic

Incumbent Democrat Zach Conine successfully ran for re-election.

Republican candidates included business owner Manny Kess and member of the Las Vegas city council Michele Fiore. Bryan Elliott ran as a Libertarian, while Margaret Hendrickson ran as the candidate of the Independent American Party.

Conine and Fiore won their respective primaries on June 14.

== New Mexico ==
New Mexico State Treasurer election
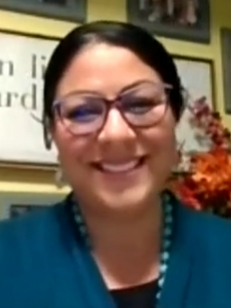

Nominee	Laura Montoya	Harry Montoya
Party	Democratic	Republican
Popular vote	370,089	326,224
Percentage	53.1%	46.9%
- County results L. Montoya: 50–60% 60–70% 70–80% H. Montoya: 50–60% 60–70% 70–80% 80–90%
Treasurer before election
Tim Eichenberg
Democratic
Elected Treasurer
Laura Montoya
Democratic

Incumbent Democrat Tim Eichenberg was term-limited and cannot seek a third term. Democratic candidates included former judge Heather Benavidez and former Sandoval County treasurer Laura Montoya. Harry Montoya ran unopposed in the Republican primary.

Both Montoyas won their respective primaries on June 7.

Laura Montoya won the general election.

== New York ==
New York State Comptroller election
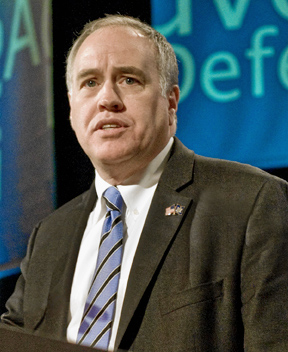

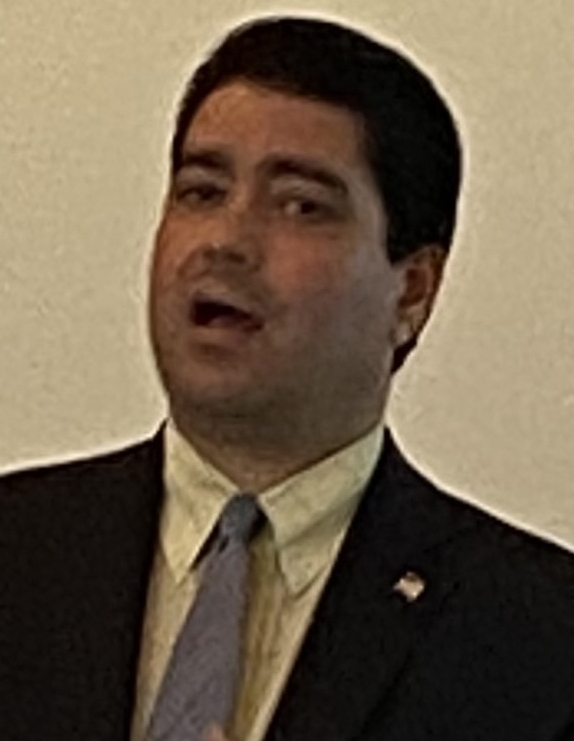
Nominee	Thomas DiNapoli	Paul Rodríguez
Party	Democratic	Republican
Popular vote	3,305,112	2,463,404
Percentage	57.3%	42.7%
- County results DiNapoli: 50–60% 60–70% 70–80% 80–90% Rodriguez: 50–60% 60–70% 70–80%
Comptroller before election
Thomas DiNapoli
Democratic
Elected Comptroller
Thomas DiNapoli
Democratic

The duties of treasurer have been carried out by the New York State Comptroller since the office of New York State Treasurer was abolished in 1926. Incumbent Democrat Thomas DiNapoli is running for re-election. He faced a primary challenge from Quanda Francis, the president of Sykes Capital Management. The only Republican candidate is former Wall Street analyst and financial adviser Paul Rodriguez.

DiNapoli and Rodriguez won their respective primaries on June 28.

== Ohio ==
Ohio State Treasurer election
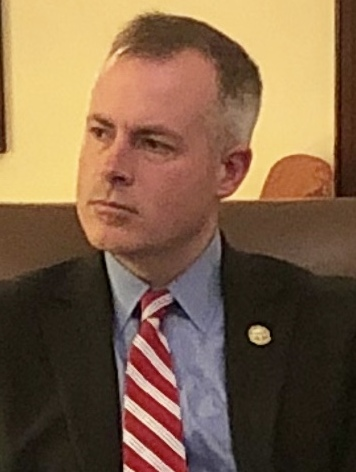

Nominee	Robert Sprague	Scott Schertzer
Party	Republican	Democratic
Popular vote	2,390,542	1,692,160
Percentage	58.55%	41.45%
- County results Sprague: 50–60% 60–70% 70–80% 80–90% Schertzer: 50–60% 60–70%
State Treasurer before election
Robert Sprague
Republican
Elected State Treasurer
Robert Sprague
Republican

Incumbent Republican Robert Sprague successfully ran for re-election. Democratic mayor of Marion Scott Schertzer ran against him.

Sprague and Schertzer won their respective primaries on May 3.

== Oklahoma ==
Oklahoma State Treasurer election
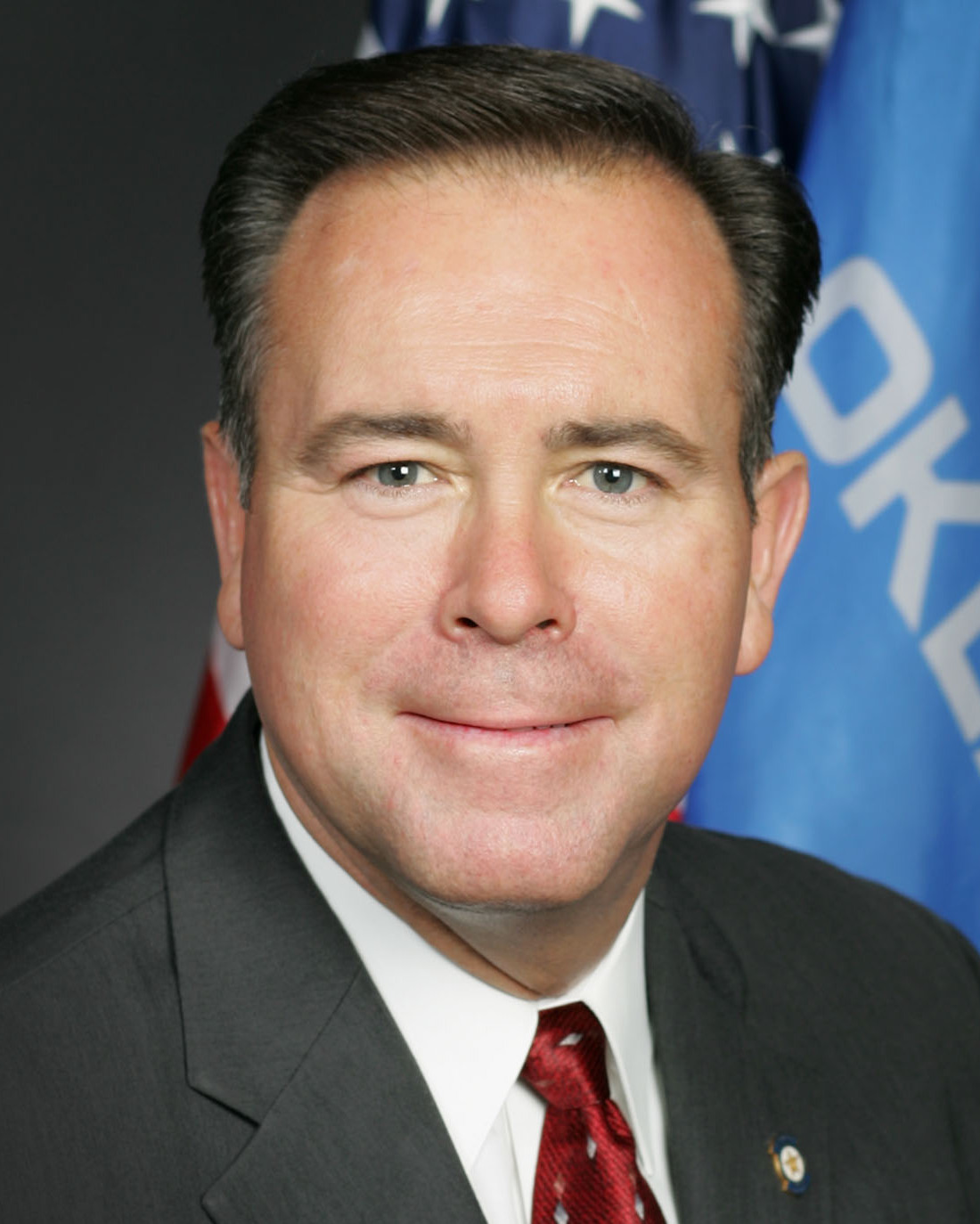

Nominee	Todd Russ	Charles de Coune
Party	Republican	Democratic
Popular vote	738,545	349,876
Percentage	64.8%	30.7%
- Russ: 40–50% 50–60% 60–70% 70–80% 80–90% >90% Coune: 40–50% 50–60% 60–70% 70–80% 80–90% >90% Tie: 40–50% 50% No votes
State Treasurer before election
Randy McDaniel
Republican
Elected State Treasurer
Todd Russ
Republican

Incumbent Republican Randy McDaniel retired. Republican candidates included Oklahoma County county clerk David B. Hooten, former chairman of the Oklahoma Tax Commission Clark Jolley, and state representative Todd Russ.

The only Democratic candidate is Charles De Coune, who ran for treasurer in 2018 as an independent. Gregory J. Sadler is running as a Libertarian.

Russ won his runoff on August 23, while de Coune won his primary on June 28. Russ won the general election.

== Rhode Island ==
Rhode Island General Treasurer election
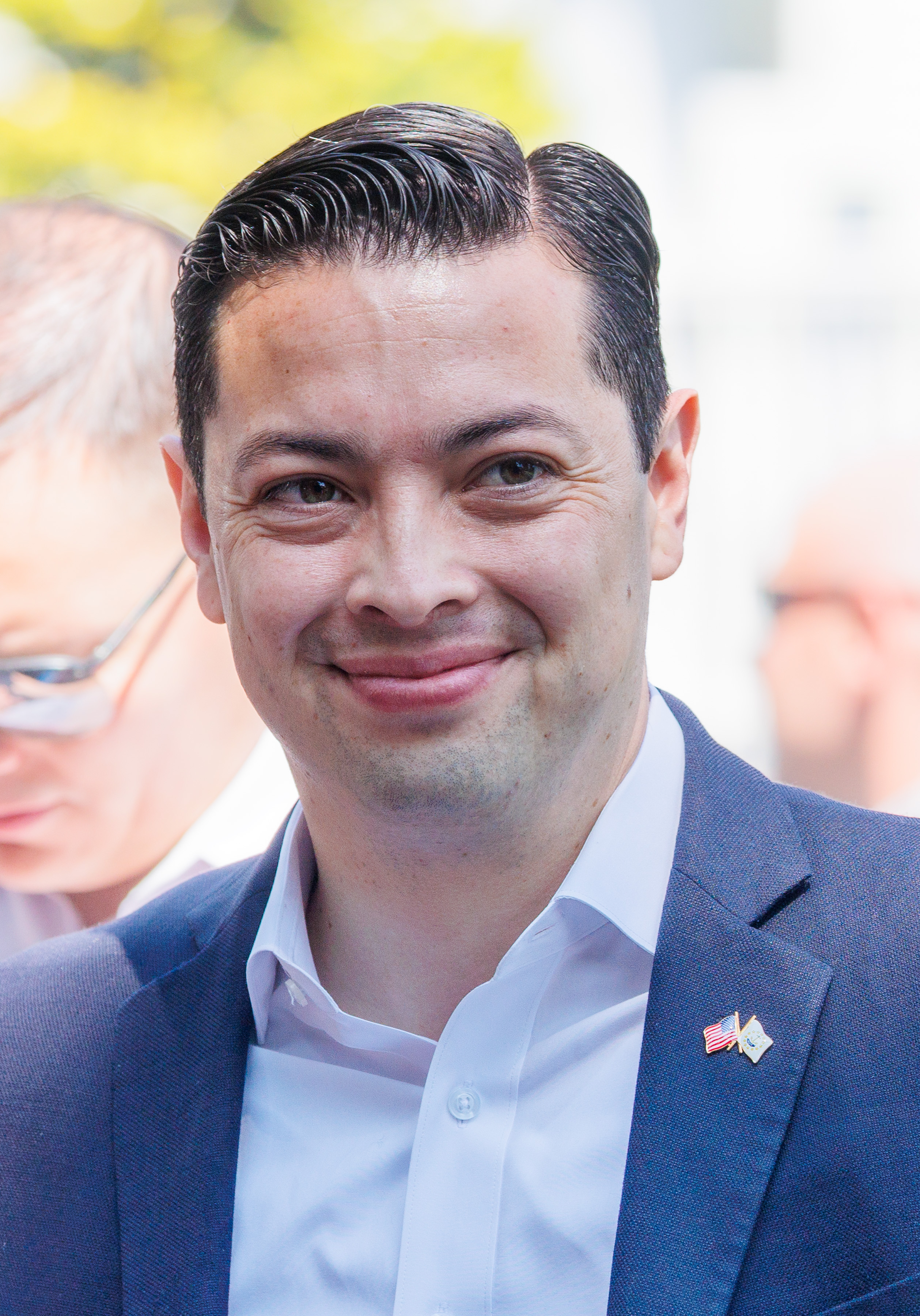

Nominee	James Diossa	James Lathrop
Party	Democratic	Republican
Popular vote	190,775	159,834
Percentage	54.3%	45.5%
- Diossa: 50–60% 60–70% 70–80% Lathrop: 50–60% 60–70%
General Treasurer before election
Seth Magaziner
Democratic
Elected General Treasurer
James Diossa
Democratic

Incumbent Democrat Seth Magaziner was term-limited and cannot seek a third term. Democratic candidates included former Central Falls mayor James Diossa and Rhode Island Commerce Secretary Stefan Pryor.

The only Republican candidate was North Kingstown finance director James Lathrop.

Diossa won the primary and the general election.

== South Carolina ==
2022 South Carolina Treasurer election
- November 8, 2022
- Turnout: 50.86%
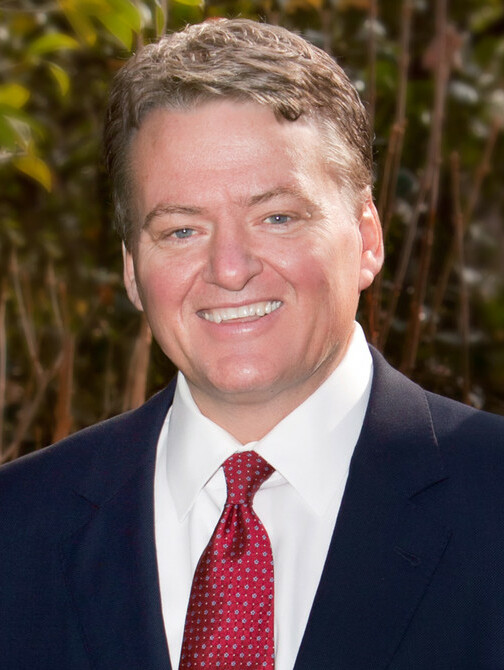

Candidate	Curtis Loftis	Sarah E. Work
Party	Republican	Alliance
Popular vote	1,129,961	281,695
Percentage	79.67%	19.86%
- Loftis: 40–50% 50–60% 60–70% 70–80% 80–90% >90% Work: 40–50% 50–60% 60–70% 70–80% 80–90% >90% Tie: 40–50% 50% No votes
Treasurer before election
Curtis Loftis
Republican
Elected Treasurer
Curtis Loftis
Republican

Incumbent Republican Curtis Loftis ran for re-election. His only opponent is Sarah E. Work, a member of the Alliance Party.

Loftis won his primary on June 14. He won re-election.

== South Dakota ==
South Dakota State Treasurer election
Nominee	Josh Haeder	John Cunningham
Party	Republican	Democratic
Popular vote	219,334	107,916
Percentage	67.02%	32.98%
- County results Haeder: 50–60% 60–70% 70–80% 80–90% >90% Cunningham: 50–60% 60–70% 70–80% 80–90%
Treasurer before election
Josh Haeder
Republican
Elected Treasurer
Josh Haeder
Republican

Incumbent Republican Josh Haeder ran for re-election.

Haeder won the nomination at the Republican state convention on June 25.

John Cunningham was the Democratic nominee.

Haeder easily won re-election.

== Texas ==
Texas Comptroller of Public Accounts election
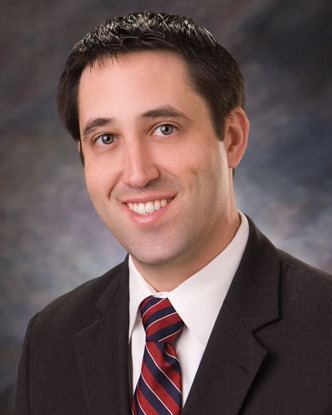
Nominee	Glenn Hegar	Janet Dudding
Party	Republican	Democratic
Popular vote	4,496,319	3,265,069
Percentage	56.4%	40.9%
- Hegar: 40–50% 50–60% 60–70% 70–80% 80–90% >90% Dudding: 40–50% 50–60% 60–70% 70–80% 80–90% >90% Tie: 40–50% 50% No data
Comptroller before election
Glenn Hegar
Republican
Elected Comptroller
Glenn Hegar
Republican

The duties of treasurer have been carried out by the Texas Comptroller of Public Accounts since the office of Texas State Treasurer was abolished in 1996. Incumbent Republican Glenn Hegar ran for re-election.

Democratic candidates included Certified Public Accountant Janet Dudding, attorney Tim Mahoney and author Angel Luis Vega.

Hegar won his primary on March 1, while Dudding won her runoff on May 24.

Hegar easily won re-election.

== Utah (special) ==
Utah State Treasurer special election
- November 8, 2022
- Turnout: 51.51%
Candidate	Marlo Oaks	Joseph Buchman
Party	Republican	Libertarian
Popular vote	726,482	97,171
Percentage	74.11%	9.91%
Candidate	Thomas Horne	Warren T. Rogers
Party	United Utah	Independent American
Popular vote	94,265	62,295
Percentage	9.62%	6.36%
- Oaks: 30–40% 40–50% 50–60% 60–70% 70–80% 80–90% >90% Buchman: 30–40% 40–50% 60–70% >90% Horne: 30–40% 50–60% 60–70% >90% Rogers: 50–60% 60–70% >90% Tie: 30–40% 50% No votes
State Treasurer before election
Marlo Oaks
Republican
Elected State Treasurer
Marlo Oaks
Republican

Incumbent Republican Marlo Oaks was appointed June 29, 2021, after his predecessor, David Damschen, resigned. He ran in the special election. He was challenged by Libertarian Joseph Buchman, Independent American Warren Rogers, and United Utah Thomas Horne.

Oaks won his primary on June 28, and won the general election.

== Vermont ==
Vermont State Treasurer election
- November 8, 2022
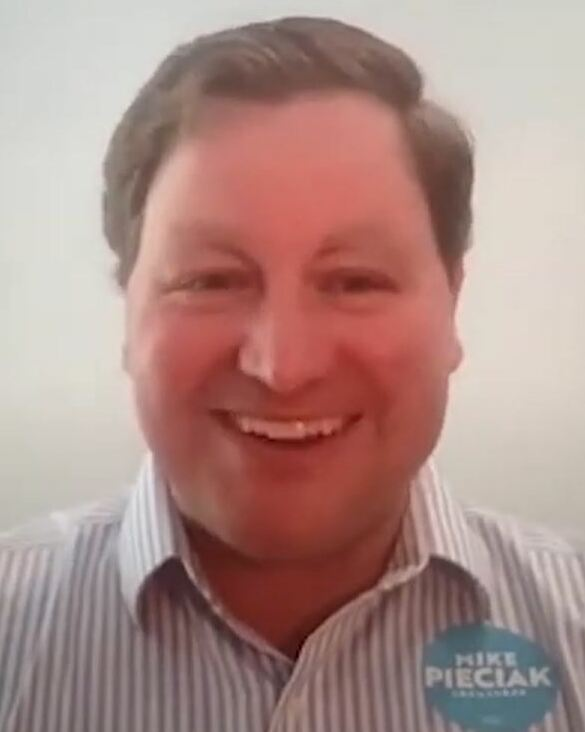

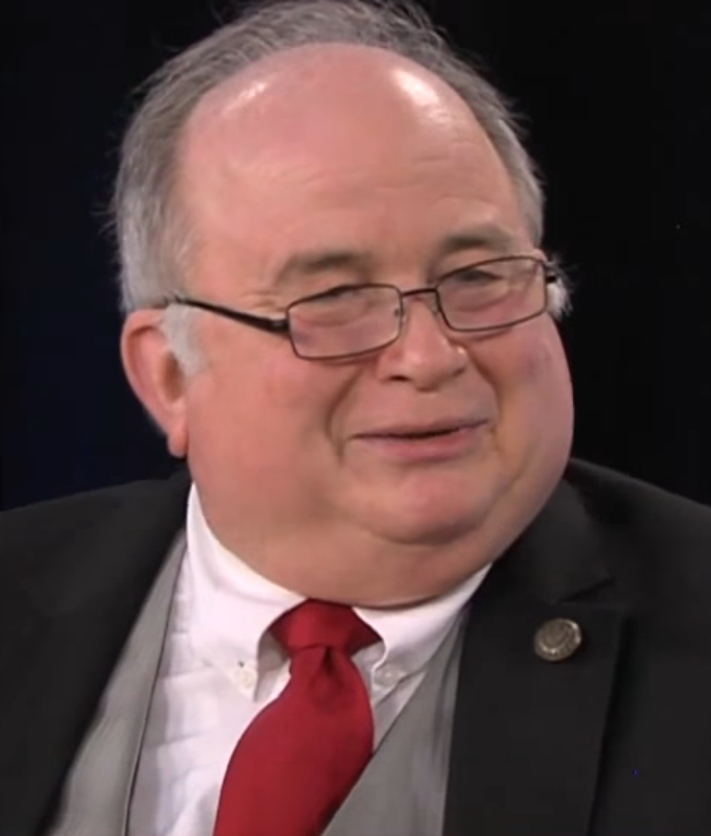
Nominee	Mike Pieciak	H. Brooke Paige
Party	Democratic	Republican
Popular vote	182,571	95,440
Percentage	62.5%	32.7%
- County results Pearce: 40–50% 50–60% 60–70% 70–80% Paige: 50–60%
State Treasurer before election
Beth Pearce
Democratic
Elected State Treasurer
Mike Pieciak
Democratic

Incumbent Democrat Beth Pearce is retired.

The only Democratic candidate was former commissioner of the Vermont Department of Financial Regulation Mike Pieciak, while the only Republican candidate was perennial candidate H. Brooke Paige. Paige dropped out of the race on August 19. However, the party's executive committee could not find another candidate in time, and Paige continued as the Republican nominee. Don Schramm ran as the candidate of the Vermont Progressive Party.

Pieciak won the general election.

== Wisconsin ==
Wisconsin State Treasurer election
Nominee	John Leiber	Aaron Richardson
Party	Republican	Democratic
Popular vote	1,293,553	1,254,949
Percentage	49.6%	48.1%
- Leiber: 40–50% 50–60% 60–70% 70–80% 80–90% >90% Richardson: 40–50% 50–60% 60–70% 70–80% 80–90% >90% Tie: 40–50% 50% No data
Treasurer before election
Sarah Godlewski
Democratic
Elected Treasurer
John Leiber
Republican

Incumbent Democratic Party Treasurer Sarah Godlewski chose not to seek re-election, instead unsuccessfully running for US Senate.

Richardson and Leiber won their respective primaries on August 9, 2022.

Republican John Leiber defeated Democrat Aaron Richardson in the general election.

== Wyoming ==
Wyoming State Treasurer election
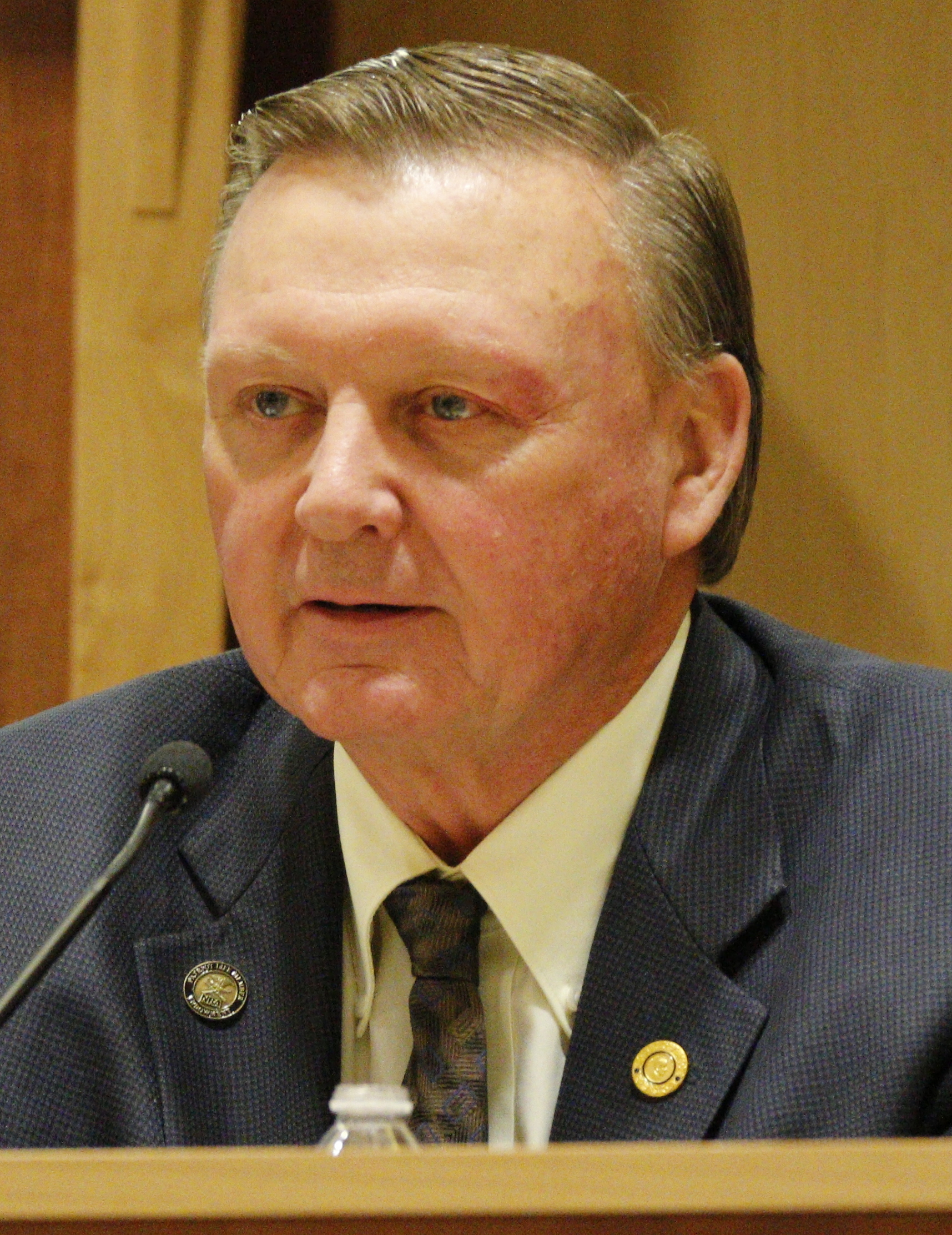
Nominee	Curt Meier
Party	Republican
Treasurer before election
Curt Meier
Republican
Elected Treasurer
Curt Meier
Republican

Incumbent Republican Curt Meier ran for re-election. He faced a primary challenge from Bill Gallop. Meier won the primary on August 16. He won the general election unopposed.
