= 2026 Connecticut State Treasurer election =

- November 3, 2026
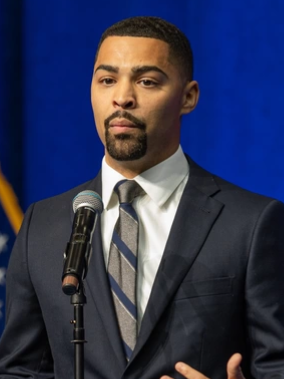

Nominee	Erick Russell	Fred Wilms
Party	Democratic	Republican
Alliance	Working Families	Independent
Popular vote	768,269	506,005
Percentage	60.29%	39.71%
- Russell: 50–60% 60–70% 70–80% 80–90% >90% Wilms: 50–60% 60–70%
State Treasurer before election
Erick Russell
Democratic
Elected State Treasurer
Erick Russell
Democratic

The 2026 Connecticut State Treasurer election was held on November 3, 2026, to elect the Connecticut State Treasurer. Primary elections were held on August 11, 2026.

Incumbent Democratic state treasurer Erick Russell, who was first elected in 2022 with 52.4% of the vote, won re-election to a second term in office.

== Democratic primary ==
=== Candidates ===
==== Nominee ====
- Erick Russell, incumbent state treasurer

== Republican primary ==
=== Candidates ===
==== Nominee ====
- Fred Wilms, former state representative and Senior Vice President of Webster Bank

== General election ==
=== Results ===
2026 Connecticut State Treasurer election
Party	Candidate	Votes	%	±%
Democratic	Erick Russell	732,870	57.51	+6.74
Working Families	Erick Russell	35,399	2.78	+1.16
Total	Erick Russell (incumbent)	768,269	60.29	+7.90
Republican	Fred Wilms	481,283	37.77	−7.16
Independent Party	Fred Wilms	24,722	1.94	N/A
Total	Fred Wilms	506,005	39.71	−7.16
Total votes		1,274,274	100.00	
Democratic hold				
