= 2026 Massachusetts Treasurer and Receiver-General election =

- November 3, 2026

Nominee	Deb Goldberg	Elizabeth Dionne
Party	Democratic	Republican
Treasurer before election
Deb Goldberg
Democratic
Elected Treasurer
Deb Goldberg
Democratic

The 2026 Massachusetts Treasurer and Receiver-General election was held on November 3, 2026, to elect the Massachusetts Treasurer and Receiver-General, concurrently with elections to the United States Senate, U.S. House of Representatives, governor, and other state and local elections. Primary elections were held on September 1, 2026.

Incumbent Democratic treasurer and receiver-general Deb Goldberg, who was re-elected in 2022 with 76.5% of the vote, won re-election to a fourth term in office.

== Democratic primary ==
=== Candidates ===
==== Nominee ====
- Deb Goldberg, incumbent treasurer and receiver-general (2015–present)

=== Endorsements ===
Deb Goldberg

Political parties

- Massachusetts Democratic Party

=== Results ===
Democratic primary results
Party	Candidate	Votes	%
Democratic	Deb Goldberg (incumbent)	733,127	99.5
Write-in		3,526	0.5
Total votes		736,653	100.0

== Republican primary ==
=== Candidates ===
==== Nominee ====
- Elizabeth Dionne, former Belmont Selectmen member, attorney, and educator

=== Endorsements ===
Elizabeth Dionne

Statewide officials

- Kerry Healey, former Massachusetts lieutenant governor (2003–2007) (Forward Party)
- Joe Malone, former Massachusetts state treasurer (1991–1999) (Independent)
- Jane Swift, former acting governor of Massachusetts (2001–2003)

State legislators

- Michael Soter, state representative (2019–present)
- Marcus Vaughn, state representative (2023–present)

Local officials

- Bob Hedlund, former mayor of Weymouth (2016–2025) and former state senator (1995–2016)

Newspapers

- The Boston Globe
- The Boston Herald

Political parties

- Forward Party
- Massachusetts Republican Party

Organizations

- Maggie's List
- Log Cabin Republicans

=== Results ===
Republican primary results
Party	Candidate	Votes	%
Republican	Elizabeth Dionne	203,397	99.4
Write-in		1,154	0.6
Total votes		202,243	100.0

== General election ==
=== Polling ===
Poll source	Date(s) administered	Sample size (Note: Key: A – all adults RV – registered voters LV – likely voters V – unclear)	Margin of error	Deb Goldberg (D)	Elizabeth Dionne (R)	Other	Undecided
Suffolk University (Note: Poll sponsored by The Boston Globe.)	October 14–18, 2026	500 (LV)	± 4.4%	58%	24%	1% (Note: "Refused" with 1%)	17%
UMass Amherst/YouGov (Note: Poll sponsored by WCVB-TV.)	October 5–12, 2026	800 (RV)	± 4.2%	52%	27%	4% (Note: "Other" with 4%)	18%

=== Results ===
2026 Massachusetts Treasurer and Receiver-General election
Party	Candidate	Votes	%	±%
Democratic	Deb Goldberg (incumbent)			
Republican	Elizabeth Dionne			
Write-in				
Total votes			100.0	

== Notes ==
Partisan clients
