= Connecticut's 106th House of Representatives district =

American legislative district

Connecticut's 106th State House of Representatives district
Representative
Mitch Bolinsky; R

Connecticut's 106th House of Representatives district elects one member of the Connecticut House of Representatives. It encompasses parts of Newtown and has been represented by Republican Mitch Bolinsky since 2013.

== List of representatives ==
List of Representatives from Connecticut's 106th House District
Representative	Party	Years	District home	Note
Anthony M. Ciarlone	Democratic	1967–1971	New Haven	Seat created
John V. Cassidento	Democratic	1971–1973	New Haven	
Sarah Frances Curtis	Republican	1973–1975	Newtown	
John W. Anderson	Democratic	1975–1981	Newtown	
Mae Schmidle	Republican	1981–1991	Newtown	
Julia Wasserman	Republican	1991–2009	Sandy Hook	
Christopher Lyddy	Democratic	2009–2013	Newtown	
Mitch Bolinsky	Republican	2013–	Newtown	Incumbent
Michelle Embree Ku	Democratic	2027 incumbent		

== Recent elections ==
=== 2020 ===
2020 Connecticut State House of Representatives election, District 106
Party	Candidate	Votes	%
Republican	Mitch Bolinsky (incumbent)	7,331	51.36
Democratic	Rebekah Harriman-Stites	6,658	46.64
Working Families	Rebekah Harriman-Stites	286	2.00
Total votes		14,275	100.00
Republican hold			

=== 2018 ===
2018 Connecticut House of Representatives election, District 106
Party	Candidate	Votes	%
Republican	Mitch Bolinsky (Incumbent)	5,697	50.5
Democratic	Rebekah Harriman-Stites	5,575	49.5
Total votes		11,272	100.00
Republican hold			

=== 2016 ===
2016 Connecticut House of Representatives election, District 106
Party	Candidate	Votes	%
Republican	Mitch Bolinsky (Incumbent)	7,185	57.44
Democratic	Eva Zimmerman	5,323	42.56
Total votes		12,508	100.00
Republican hold			

=== 2014 ===
2014 Connecticut House of Representatives election, District 106
Party	Candidate	Votes	%
Republican	Mitch Bolinsky (Incumbent)	4,661	55.4
Democratic	Matt Cole	3,753	44.6
Total votes		8,414	100.00
Republican hold			

=== 2012 ===
2012 Connecticut House of Representatives election, District 106
Party	Candidate	Votes	%
Republican	Mitch Bolinsky	5,727	50.1
Democratic	Lisa Romano	5,712	49.9
Total votes		11,439	100.00
Republican hold			
