= Shawn Wooden =

Shawn Wooden may refer to:

- Shawn Wooden (American football) (born 1973), former American football safety
- Shawn Wooden (politician), American politician

== See also ==
- Shawn Wooten (born 1972), American baseball player and coach
