= Christopher Lyddy =

American politician

Member of the Connecticut House of Representatives from the 106th district
- In office January 7, 2009 – January 9, 2013
- Preceded by: Julia Wasserman
- Succeeded by: Mitch Bolinsky

Personal details
- Born: April 8, 1983 (age 43)
- Party: Democratic
- Spouse: Erick Russell

Christopher Lyddy (born April 8, 1983) is an American politician who served in the Connecticut House of Representatives from the 106th district from 2009 to 2013. He was previously elected to the Town of Newtown's Legislative Council where in his first run for office received the highest number of votes of any council candidate during the 2007 election, surprising veteran politicos in Newtown and throughout the region.

Lyddy has a degree in social work from Salve Regina University, where he later was awarded the university's first annual Outstanding Young Alumni Award , and a master's degree from the University of Pennsylvania.

Throughout college Lyddy interned for and later became chairman of the Newtown Parent Connection. He is credited with being instrumental in securing funding for the organization to renovate a Fairfield building as its new, permanent headquarters and was later honored by the community for his thirteen years of service to the organization. Fairfield Hills Hospital

During his speech to nominate Chris Murphy for Murphy's third term in congress, Lyddy credited Murphy, now a United States Senator, with inspiring him to run for office.

During his tenure in the Connecticut General Assembly, Lyddy quietly and strategically championed and built bipartisan support for legislation related to education and public health.

Lyddy led on issues such as the long-term care and treatment of Lyme disease, ensuring doctors and patients had the autonomy to determine the best course of treatment without the threat of prosecution when treating outside of the IDSA guidelines.

On December 14, 2012, a mass shooting occurred at the Sandy Hook Elementary School in Newtown, just a few days before the end of Lyddy's second and final term in the Connecticut House of Representatives.

Shortly after the shooting, Governor Malloy commissioned and appointed Lyddy to the Sandy Hook Advisory Commission and was later appointed to the Connecticut Board of Pardons and Paroles and was also appointed by republican state Senator John McKinney to serve on the state's Child Fatality Review Panel.

Lyddy provided consultation to the Office of the Child Advocate in the review and investigation of “the shooting at Sandy Hook Elementary School” and is listed as a primary author of the investigatory report.

In this capacity, Lyddy also supported the Office with its 18-month investigation of the Connecticut Juvenile Training School (CJTS) and Pueblo Girls’ Unit. In addition to the 66 page report, Lyddy and Sarah Eagan, the state's Child Advocate, released bombshell videos that show the abuse and maltreatment of youth incarcerated in CJTS.

Lyddy later served on Connecticut’s Board of Pardons and Paroles and as the inaugural chief operating officer of Connecticut’s Office of Early Childhood.

Lyddy worked for Barbara Dalio, wife of hedge fund billionaire Ray Dalio, as the director of partnerships for Dalio Philanthropies. Philanthropies made waves throughout Connecticut when it released the report, CT's Unspoken Crisis (2023), arguing that 1 in 5 of young people between the ages of 14 and 26 are at risk or disconnected from education and the workforce.

He now serves as Senior Advisor and Director of Intergovernmental Affairs and Accountability for the Connecticut Senate Democratic caucus, a move considered to be a “big get” for the party.

Lyddy's husband, Erick Russell, was elected Connecticut State Treasurer in the 2022 elections, becoming the first Black LGBT statewide officeholder in the United States.
