= 2018 Connecticut State Treasurer election =

- November 6, 2018

| Nominee | Shawn Wooden | Thad Gray |
| Party | Democratic | Republican |
| Alliance | Working Families | Independent Party |
| Popular vote | 748,091 | 592,811 |
| Percentage | 55.1% | 43.7% |
- Wooden: 40–50% 50–60% 60–70% 70–80% 80–90% Gray: 40–50% 50–60% 60–70% 80–90%
State Treasurer before election
Denise Nappier
Democratic
Elected State Treasurer
Shawn Wooden
Democratic

The 2018 Connecticut State Treasurer election took place on November 6, 2018, to elect the next Connecticut State Treasurer. Five-term incumbent Democratic Party Treasurer Denise Nappier did not seek re-election. Democratic nominee Shawn Wooden defeated Republican nominee Thad Gray with 55.1% of the vote.

== Democratic primary ==
=== Candidates ===
==== Nominee ====
- Shawn Wooden, attorney and former member of the Hartford City Council

==== Eliminated in primary ====
- Dita Bhargava, COO of Catalan Investments

==== Declined ====
- Denise Nappier, incumbent state treasurer

=== Endorsements ===
Shawn Wooden

Mayors

- Toni Harp, mayor of New Haven

=== Results ===
Democratic primary results
| Party | Candidate | Votes | % |
|---|---|---|---|
| Democratic | Shawn Wooden | 116,167 | 56.82% |
| Democratic | Dita Bhargava | 88,298 | 43.18% |
| Total votes | | 204,465 | 100.0% |

== Republican primary ==
=== Candidates ===
==== Nominee ====
- Thad Gray, former CIO of Abbot Capital Management

==== Eliminated in primary ====
- Art Linares, state senator

=== Endorsements ===
Thad Gray

Individuals

- Leora Levy, Republican National Committeewoman
Art Linares

Governors

- Chris Christie, former governor of New Jersey (2010–2018) and candidate for President of the United States in 2016

=== Results ===
Republican primary results
| Party | Candidate | Votes | % |
|---|---|---|---|
| Republican | Thad Gray | 74,042 | 56.04% |
| Republican | Art Linares | 58,087 | 43.96% |
| Total votes | | 132,129 | 100.0% |

== General election ==
=== Results ===
2018 Connecticut Secretary of the State election
| Party | Candidate | Votes | % | ±% |
|---|---|---|---|---|
| Democratic | Shawn Wooden | 717,002 | 52.78% | −1.49% |
| Working Families | Shawn Wooden | 31,089 | 2.29% | N/A |
| Total | Shawn Wooden | 748,091 | 55.06% | +0.79% |
| Republican | Thad Gray | 569,737 | 41.94% | −1.51% |
| Independent Party | Thad Gray | 23,069 | 1.70% | +0.29% |
| Total | Thad Gray | 592,811 | 43.63% | +0.18% |
| Libertarian | Jesse Brohinsky | 15,514 | 1.14% | N/A |
| Write-in | W. Michael Downes | 2,196 | 0.16% | N/A |
| Total votes | | 1,358,612 | 100.0% | |
| Democratic hold | | | | |

==== By congressional district ====
Wooden won all five congressional districts.

| District | Wooden | Gray | Representative |
|---|---|---|---|
| 1st | 59% | 39% | John B. Larson |
| 2nd | 52% | 47% | Joe Courtney |
| 3rd | 58% | 41% | Rosa DeLauro |
| 4th | 56% | 43% | Jim Himes |
| 5th | 51% | 48% | Elizabeth Esty (115th Congress) |
| 5th | 51% | 48% | Jahana Hayes (116th Congress) |
