= 2022 Massachusetts Treasurer and Receiver-General election =

- November 8, 2022
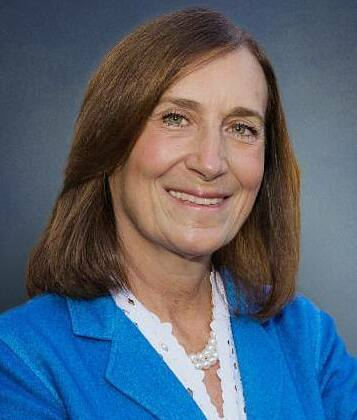

Nominee	Deb Goldberg	Cristina Crawford
Party	Democratic	Libertarian
Popular vote	1,709,555	516,019
Percentage	76.47%	23.08%
- Goldberg: 50–60% 60–70% 70–80% 80–90% >90%
Treasurer before election
Deb Goldberg
Democratic
Elected Treasurer
Deb Goldberg
Democratic

The 2022 Massachusetts Treasurer and Receiver-General election took place on November 8, 2022, to elect the Massachusetts Treasurer and Receiver-General. Incumbent Democratic Treasurer Deb Goldberg won re-election, and was challenged by Libertarian Cristina Crawford.

== Democratic primary ==
=== Candidates ===
==== Nominee ====
- Deb Goldberg, incumbent state treasurer

=== Results ===
Democratic primary results
Party	Candidate	Votes	%
Democratic	Deb Goldberg (incumbent)	630,633	100.0%
Total votes		630,633	100.0%

== Libertarian convention ==
=== Candidates ===
==== Nominee ====
- Cristina Crawford, former Chairwoman of the Libertarian Association of Massachusetts

== Republican primary ==
=== Candidates ===
==== Withdrew ====
- Ron Beaty, former Barnstable County commissioner (running for Barnstable County Commission)

== General election ==
=== Polling ===
Poll source	Date(s) administered	Sample size	Margin of error	Deb Goldberg (D)	Cristina Crawford (L)	Other	Undecided
UMass Amherst/YouGov	October 20–26, 2022	700 (RV)	± 4.3%	54%	37%	1% (Note: "Other" with 1%)	8%
Suffolk University	October 13–16, 2022	500 (LV)	± 4.4%	48%	21%	2% (Note: "Refused" with 2%)	29%
Suffolk University	September 10–13, 2022	500 (RV)	± 4.4%	47%	18%	2%	33%

=== Results ===
2022 Massachusetts Treasurer and Receiver-General election
Party	Candidate	Votes	%	±%
Democratic	Deb Goldberg (incumbent)	1,709,555	76.47%	+8.85%
Libertarian	Cristina Crawford	516,019	23.08%	N/A
Write-in		9,994	0.45%	+0.39%
Total votes		2,235,568	100.0%	
Democratic hold				

==== By county ====
By county

County	Deb Goldberg Democratic		Cristina Crawford Libertarian		Write-in	
County	#	%	#	%	#	%
Barnstable	77,591	73.65%	27,343	25.95%	424	0.4%
Berkshire	37,121	82.18%	7,979	17.66%	69	0.15%
Bristol	113,015	70.2%	47,162	29.3%	808	0.5%
Dukes	7,282	84.48%	1,328	15.41%	10	0.12%
Essex	192,185	75.39%	61,322	24.06%	1,398	0.55%
Franklin	23,702	81.22%	5,381	18.44%	98	0.34%
Hampden	86,576	70.48%	35,465	28.87%	797	0.65%
Hampshire	49,576	83.08%	9,954	16.68%	141	0.24%
Middlesex	445,308	80.9%	103,227	18.75%	1,907	0.35%
Nantucket	3,546	79.19%	921	20.57%	11	0.25%
Norfolk	198,016	77.3%	57,048	22.27%	1,089	0.43%
Plymouth	133,957	70.4%	55,477	29.15%	855	0.45%
Suffolk	158,164	85.79%	25,293	13.72%	906	0.49%
Worcester	183,516	69.75%	78,119	29.69%	1,481	0.56%
Totals	1,709,555	76.47%	516,019	23.08%	9,994	0.45%

== See also ==
- 2022 Massachusetts elections
- 2022 United States treasurer elections
