= Mitch Bolinsky =

American politician

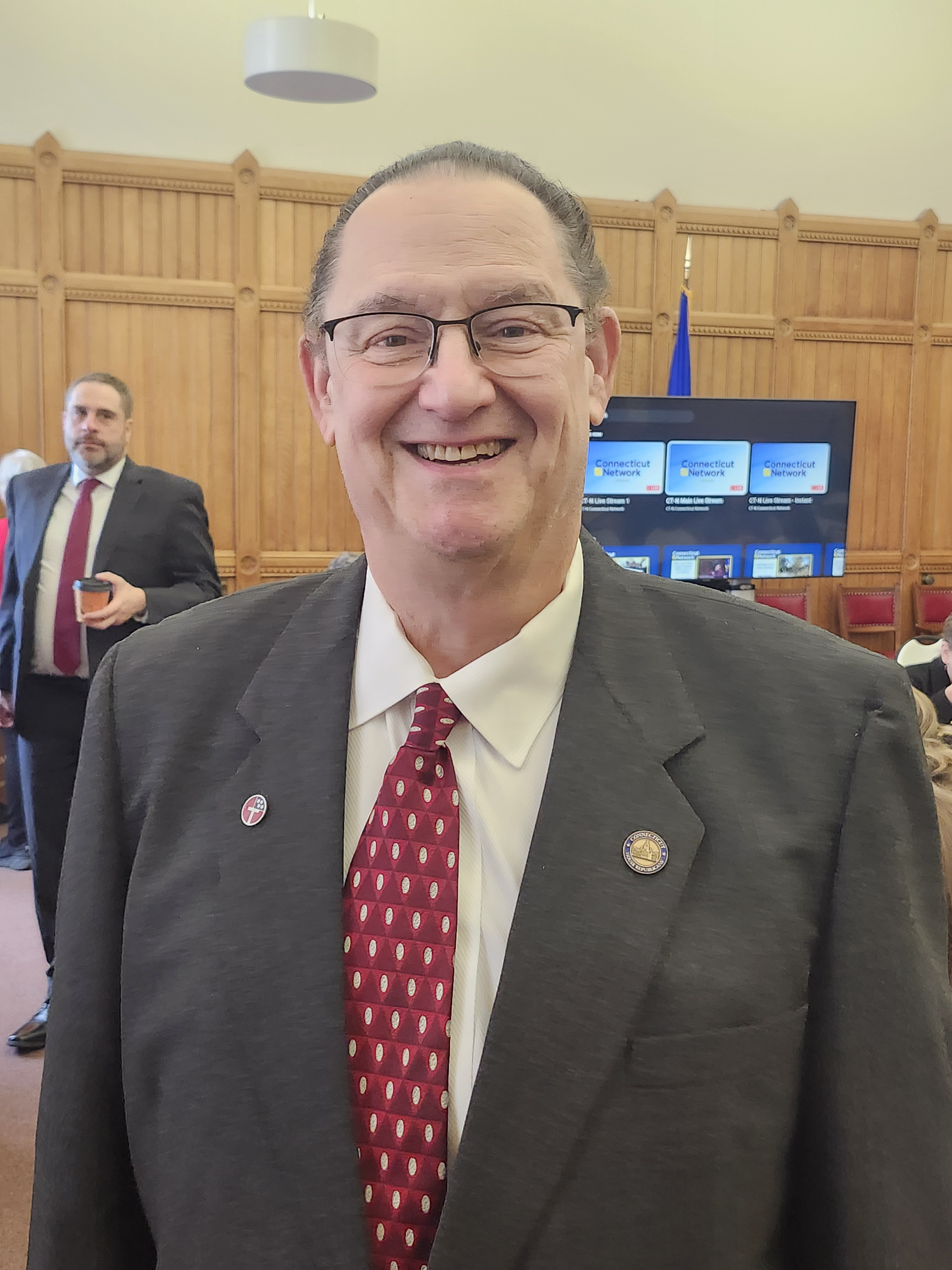

Member of the Connecticut House of Representatives from the 106th district
- Incumbent
- Assumed office January 9, 2013
- Preceded by: Christopher Lyddy
- Succeeded by: Michelle Embree Ku (elect)

Personal details
- Born: September 17, 1958 (age 68) Queens, New York, U.S.
- Party: Republican
- Education: University of Wisconsin–Madison (BBA)

Mitch Bolinsky (born September 17, 1958) is an American politician who has served in the Connecticut House of Representatives from the 106th district since 2013. He was unseated at the 2026 election.
