= Michelle Embree Ku =

American politician

Member-elect of the Connecticut House of Representatives from the 106th district
- Assuming office January 2027
- Succeeding: Mitch Bolinsky

Personal details
- Party: Democratic
- Website: Campaign website

Michelle Embree Ku is an American politician. A member of the Democratic Party, she is the member-elect for the 106th district of the Connecticut House of Representatives. She unseated incumbent six-term Republican Mitch Bolinsky for the 2026 election. She is a community leader in Newtown, Connecticut.
