= Mae Schmidle =

American politician (1926–2019)

Member of the Connecticut House of Representatives from the 106th district
- In office 1981–1991
- Succeeded by: Julia Wasserman

Personal details
- Born: June 8, 1926 Bridgeport, Connecticut, U.S.
- Died: April 26, 2019 (aged 92) Newtown, Connecticut, U.S.
- Party: Republican

Mae Schmidle (June 8, 1926 – April 26, 2019) was an American politician who served in the Connecticut House of Representatives from 1981 to 1991, representing the 106th district.

== Biography ==
Schmidle was born in Bridgeport, Connecticut, and lived in Newtown with her husband and family and was involved with the Newtown Parent Teacher Association. Schmidle served as the president of the Connecticut State Parent Teacher Association. She served as the Newtown town clerk. Schmidle served in the Connecticut House of Representatives from 1981 to 1991 and was a Republican. Schmidle died at her home in Newtown, Connecticut.
