= Julia Wasserman =

American politician (1924–2015)

Member of the Connecticut House of Representatives from the 106th district
- In office January 9, 1991 – January 7, 2009
- Preceded by: Mae Schmidle
- Succeeded by: Christopher Lyddy

Personal details
- Born: April 20, 1924 Wuppertal, Germany
- Died: August 18, 2015 (aged 91) Danbury, Connecticut, U.S.
- Party: Republican

Julia Wasserman (April 20, 1924 – August 18, 2015) was an American politician who served in the Connecticut House of Representatives from the 106th district from 1991 to 2009.

She died on August 18, 2015, in Danbury, Connecticut at age 91.
