= 2022 Connecticut State Treasurer election =

- November 8, 2022
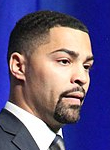

Nominee	Erick Russell	Harry Arora
Party	Democratic	Republican
Popular vote	652,907	559,141
Percentage	52.40%	44.93%
- Russell: 40–50% 50–60% 60–70% 70–80% 80–90% Arora: 40–50% 50–60% 60–70% 70–80%
State Treasurer before election
Shawn Wooden
Democratic
Elected State Treasurer
Erick Russell
Democratic

The 2022 Connecticut State Treasurer election took place on November 8, 2022, to elect the next Connecticut State Treasurer. Incumbent Democratic Treasurer Shawn Wooden did not seek re-election.

== Democratic primary ==
=== Candidates ===
==== Nominee ====
- Erick Russell, former vice chair of the Democratic Party of Connecticut

==== Eliminated in primary ====
- Dita Bhargava, COO of Catalan Investments and candidate for treasurer in 2018
- Karen DuBois-Walton, chief executive of the New Haven Housing Authority and chair of the Connecticut State Board of Education

==== Declined ====
- Arunan Arulampalam, lawyer and candidate for treasurer in 2018 (endorsed Russell)
- Rodney Butler, chair of the Mashantucket Pequot Tribal Nation
- Adam Cloud, Hartford city treasurer (endorsed Dubois-Walton)
- Shawn Wooden, incumbent state treasurer

=== Endorsements ===
Karen DuBois-Walton

Local officials

- Adam Cloud, Hartford city treasurer
- Vince "Vinnie" Mauro, chair of the New Haven democratic party

Organizations

- Connecticut Working Families Party
Erick Russell

Statewide officials

- Natalie Braswell, Connecticut State Comptroller (2021–)
- Matthew Ritter, speaker of the Connecticut House of Representatives
- Nancy Wyman, former lieutenant governor of Connecticut (2011–2019)

Local officials

- Darryl Brackeen Jr., New Haven alderman

Organizations

- Democratic Party of Connecticut
- LGBTQ Victory Fund
Declined to endorse

Statewide officials

- Ned Lamont, governor of Connecticut (2019–)

=== Results ===
Democratic primary results
Party	Candidate	Votes	%
Democratic	Erick Russell	63,726	57.52%
Democratic	Dita Bhargava	25,253	22.79%
Democratic	Karen DuBois-Walton	21,814	19.69%
Total votes		110,793	100.0%

== Republican primary ==
=== Candidates ===
==== Nominee ====
- Harry Arora, state representative from the 151st district (2020–) and Republican nominee for Connecticut's 4th congressional district in 2018

== General election ==
=== Results ===
2022 Connecticut State Treasurer election
Party	Candidate	Votes	%	±%
Democratic	Erick Russell	631,819	50.77%	−2.01%
Working Families	Erick Russell	20,212	1.62%	−0.67%
Total	Erick Russell	652,031	52.39%	-2.67%
Republican	Harry Arora	559,123	44.93%	+1.30%
Independent Party	Jennifer Baldwin	24,709	1.99%	N/A
Libertarian	JoAnna Laiscell	8,564	0.69%	−0.45%
Total votes		1,244,427	100.0%	
Democratic hold				

==== By county ====
County	Erick Russell Democratic		Harry Arora Republican		Other parties Independent		Total votes cast
County	#	%	#	%	#	%	Total votes cast
Fairfield	163,558	52.37%	141,516	45.31%	7,233	2.32%	312,307
Hartford	172,326	56.74%	123,120	40.54%	8,290	2.73%	303,736
Litchfield	33,998	42.48%	43,857	54.8%	2,181	2.72%	80,036
Middlesex	38,252	52.35%	32,799	44.89%	2,016	2.76%	73,067
New Haven	147,513	52.69%	125,190	44.72%	7,247	1.58%	279,950
New London	50,527	51.62%	44,075	45.03%	3,285	3.35%	97,887
Tolland	29,074	49.35%	28,100	47.7%	1,734	2.95%	58,908
Windham	16,873	43.55%	20,466	53.11%	1,287	3.3%	38,536
Totals	652,031	52.4%	559,123	44.93%	33,273	2.68%	1,244,427

==== By congressional district ====
Russell won four of five congressional districts with Arora winning the remaining one, which elected a Democrat.

District	Russell	Arora	Representative
1st	58%	39%	John B. Larson
2nd	50%	47%	Joe Courtney
3rd	54%	44%	Rosa DeLauro
4th	53%	45%	Jim Himes
5th	47%	50%	Jahana Hayes
