= Deb Goldberg =

American politician

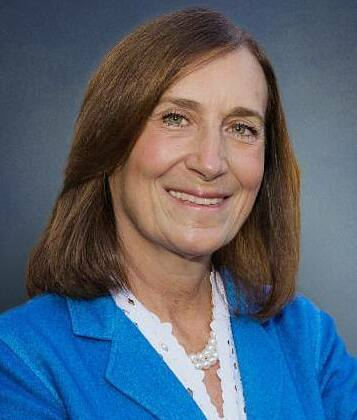

58th Treasurer of Massachusetts
- Incumbent
- Assumed office January 21, 2015
- Governor: Charlie Baker; Maura Healey
- Preceded by: Steve Grossman

Personal details
- Born: Deborah Beth Goldberg; May 11, 1954 (age 72) Brookline, Massachusetts, U.S.
- Party: Democratic
- Spouse: Michael Winter
- Children: 2
- Education: Boston University (BA); Boston College (JD); Harvard University (MBA)
- Website: Government website

Deborah Beth Goldberg (born May 11, 1954) is an American politician, businesswoman, lawyer, and member of the Rabinovitz family. She is the Treasurer of Massachusetts, serving since January 2015. She was a member of the Board of Selectmen for the town of Brookline, Massachusetts from 1998 to 2004, serving the last two terms as chair. Goldberg was a candidate in the 2006 Massachusetts Democratic primary election for lieutenant governor. In 2018, Goldberg was re-elected as State Treasurer.

== Early life and education ==
Goldberg was raised in Brookline. She graduated from Boston University with a bachelor's degree in 1975, and then received her Juris Doctor degree from Boston College in 1983 and her MBA from Harvard Business School in 1985.

Goldberg's family immigrated to Massachusetts and opened a grocery store in Boston's North End in 1892. The family opened additional stores and their business grew into what eventually became Stop & Shop, the largest supermarket chain in New England. Goldberg helped run this family business when she was younger and attributes some of her stance on advocating for local issues to her upbringing with a family-run market. She relates to her constituents with rhetoric such as "I say my family is your family" in her speeches. Though she received an MBA, she states “my real MBA came from working in the business.”

== Political career ==
=== 2006 lieutenant governor campaign ===
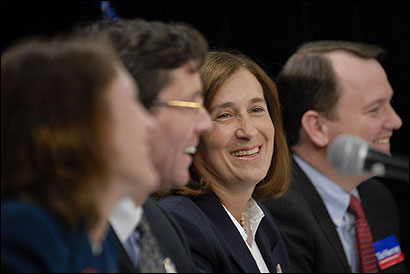
Goldberg (center right) at a debate with Andrea Silbert, Sam Kelly and Tim Murray

In the 2006 Democratic Primary, Goldberg finished second in a three-way race to then-Worcester Mayor Tim Murray with 33% of the vote.

She received the endorsement of the Boston Herald, but failed to win the endorsement of her hometown newspaper, the Brookline Tab, because, they claimed, she had "been taking too much credit" for the town's accomplishments and had "over inflate(d) the chairman's job". The strongly worded rebuke resulted in a vocal reader response and a separate endorsement from Stan Spiegel, a Brookline Tab columnist and Brookline Town Meeting member.

=== 2014 campaign for treasurer ===
On February 27, 2014, Goldberg formally announced her candidacy for State Treasurer. At the Massachusetts Democratic Convention, she was the top vote-getter in the race for Treasurer, winning 38.9% of the vote. Goldberg was the first to release a televised advertisement in the race on August 4, 2014. Goldberg was seated as Treasurer January 21, 2015 after defeating Republican Mike Heffernan in the general election.

=== 2018 re-election ===
In 2018, Goldberg was re-elected to her position as State Treasurer with 67.6% of the vote. She defeated State Representative and Republican National Committeewoman Keiko Orrall who was unopposed for the Republican nomination.

=== 2022 re-election ===
Goldberg filed paperwork to run for the open congressional seat in the Massachusetts 4th congressional district in 2020, but decided against it in October 2019. The seat was ultimately won by Jake Auchincloss. In 2022, Goldberg defeated former software engineer and Libertarian nominee Cristina Crawford. With no Republican opponent, Goldberg was re-elected as State Treasurer with 76.6% of the vote.

=== Other work ===
Prior to becoming Treasurer, Goldberg served as president of the board of directors of Adoptions with Love, was an Advisory Board member of the Greater Boston Food Bank, is a Commissioner on the Town of Brookline's Neighborhood Conservation District Commission, was Senate President Therese Murray's appointee to the Treasurer's Commonwealth Covenant Fund, and sat on the advisory board of the Taubman Center for State and Local Government at Harvard Kennedy School.

Goldberg is involved with various events for Jewish organizations such as the Jewish Alliance for Law and Social Action and was the first Jewish woman elected to statewide office in Massachusetts.

=== Controversy ===
In November 2014, it was reported that Goldberg had admonished an employee of Adoptions with Love for seeking employment with the State Treasurer's office without first informing her current employer of her job seeking plans. Goldberg came to this knowledge in her official capacity as Treasurer-elect, and her actions were seen as a breach of ethics.

Shannon O'Brien Controversy

In August 2022, Goldberg appointed former Massachusetts State Treasurer Shannon O'Brien as Chair of the Cannabis Control Commission. During O'Brien's tenure as Chair of the Cannabis Control Commission, she sought to implement public safety measures for consumers and employees in the cannabis industry. O'Brien's reforms were stymied through Goldberg's politically appointed Executive Director of the Cannabis Control Commission at the time, Shawn Collins. In retaliation, Goldberg wrongfully fired O'Brien from her role in September of 2024 for "racially, ethnically and culturally insensitive statements." O'Brien denied the allegations and sued Goldberg and the Commonwealth for wrongful termination.

In September 2025, Massachusetts Supreme Court Judge Robert Gordon ruled that Shannon O'Brien, the former chair of the Massachusetts Cannabis Control Commission, was wrongly fired and should be reinstated. In the 50-page ruling, Judge Gordon said Goldberg's allegations were built on a "house of cards". O'Brien's actions stated Judge Gordon, "do not approach - singularly or collectively - the kind of flagrant, outrageous or unconscionable acts that our case law has recognized as essential to a finding of gross misconduct." Goldberg's wrongfully firing and lawsuit with O'Brien cost Massachusetts taxpayers over $1 million in tax dollars.

In August 2026, Shannon O'Brien filed a $3 million dollar lawsuit against Goldberg over wrongful firing to tarnish her reputation when she was wrongfully fired. In her new lawsuit, O’Brien accused Goldberg and the Cannabis Control Commission of having violated her rights as a whistleblower and Goldberg of infringing on her state civil rights and privacy protections. Whistleblowers in connection with O'Brien's lawsuit have testified that Goldberg directed them to "deleted" public documents during the previous O'Brien vs. Goldberg lawsuit. O'Brien's lawsuit against Treasurer Goldberg is still ongoing.

== Electoral history ==
2006 Massachusetts Lieutenant Governor Democratic primary
Party	Candidate	Votes	%
Democratic	Tim Murray	351,009	42.60%
Democratic	Deborah Goldberg	279,771	33.95%
Democratic	Andrea Silbert	191,638	23.26%
Write-in	All others	1,591	0.19%
Write-in	Blanks	102,393	11.00%
Total votes		926,402	100%

2014 Massachusetts Treasurer and Receiver-General Democratic primary
Party	Candidate	Votes	%
Democratic	Deb Goldberg	202,077	43
Democratic	Barry Finegold	149,188	32
Democratic	Thomas Conroy	121,802	26
Total votes		473,067	100

2014 Massachusetts Treasurer and Receiver-General election
Party	Candidate	Votes	%
Democratic	Deb Goldberg	1,120,192	55.1
Republican	Mike Heffernan	828,894	40.8
Green-Rainbow	Ian T. Jackson	81,907	4.0
Total votes		2,186,789	100

2018 general election map by municipality

2018 Massachusetts Treasurer and Receiver-General election
Party	Candidate	Votes	%
Democratic	Deb Goldberg (incumbent)	1,761,282	67.6
Republican	Keiko Orrall	749,596	28.8
Green-Rainbow	Jamie Guerin	92,090	3.5
n/a	Write-ins	1,590	0.1
Total votes		2,604,558	100.0
Democratic hold			

2022 Massachusetts Treasurer and Receiver-General election
Party	Candidate	Votes	%	±%
Democratic	Deb Goldberg (incumbent)	1,709,555	76.47%	+8.85%
Libertarian	Cristina Crawford	516,019	23.08%	N/A
Write-in		9,994	0.45%	+0.39%
Total votes		2,235,568	100.0%	
Democratic hold				

== Personal life ==
She is married to Michael Winter, with whom she has two children.

== Recognition ==
Goldberg received the 2016 Excellence in Leadership Award from The Jewish Community Relations Council of Greater Boston (JCRC) and the Massachusetts Association of Jewish Federations (MAJF)'s "Women in Leadership" reception.

In 2023, Goldberg received the Lifetime Achievement Award from the Boston Arts Academy, Boston's only public arts high school, honoring her deep-rooted connection to the arts.

Party political offices
Preceded by Steven Grossman	Democratic nominee for Treasurer of Massachusetts; 2014, 2018, 2022, 2026	Most recent
Political offices
Preceded by Steve Grossman	Treasurer of Massachusetts; 2015–present	Incumbent
