= Erick Russell =

American politician

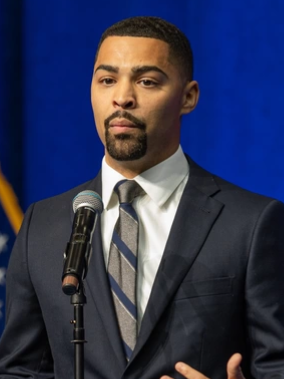
- Russell in 2023

84th Treasurer of Connecticut
- Incumbent
- Assumed office January 4, 2023
- Governor: Ned Lamont
- Preceded by: Shawn Wooden

Personal details
- Born: New Haven, Connecticut, U.S
- Party: Democratic
- Spouse: Christopher Lyddy
- Education: University of New Haven (BA); University of Connecticut (JD)
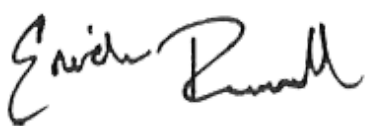
- Signature

Erick Alexander Russell is an American politician from Connecticut. A member of the Democratic Party, he is the Connecticut State Treasurer. Upon his election in 2022, he became the first Black openly gay person elected to a statewide office in the United States.

== Early life and career ==
Russell grew up in New Haven, Connecticut, where his parents owned a convenience store and deli. He graduated from the University of New Haven in 2009 with a bachelor's degree in criminal justice, becoming the first member of his family to graduate from college. He earned a Juris Doctor from the University of Connecticut School of Law in 2012. During law school, he interned for the general counsel to Governor Dannel Malloy and interned with the Connecticut Legal Rights Project.

After graduating from law school, Russell joined the law firm Pullman & Comley, based in Bridgeport, Connecticut, where he practiced public and private finance law and later became a partner. He has served as chair of the LGBT section of the Connecticut Bar Association. In 2009, Russell was elected vice chair of the Connecticut Democratic Party.

== Connecticut State Treasurer ==
Russell was sworn into office on January 4, 2023, after winning the 2022 Connecticut State Treasurer election.

=== Election results ===
After Connecticut State Treasurer Shawn Wooden announced that he would not seek reelection in 2022, Russell declared his candidacy to succeed him. In the Democratic primary election held in August 2022, Russell defeated Dita Bhargava and Karen DuBois-Walton, receiving 58 percent of the vote.

In the November 2022 general election, Russell faced state representative Harry Arora, the Republican Party nominee. Russell won the election with approximately 52 percent of the vote.

=== Tenure ===
As state treasurer, Russell is responsible for managing the state’s pension funds, trust funds, and cash and debt operations, and serves as a principal fiduciary for multiple state-administered investment programs. The Office of the Treasurer oversees tens of billions of dollars in state assets, including retirement funds for state employees and teachers.

In addition to the pension systems, the Office of the Treasurer administers and manages several state-run trust funds and investment programs. These include the Connecticut Higher Education Trust (CHET), the state’s 529 college savings program; the state’s ABLE program for individuals with disabilities; a state-supported child care endowment; and the Connecticut Safe Harbor Fund, among other investment and trust accounts administered by the office.

During his tenure, the Treasurer’s Office adopted changes to its pension fund investment strategy, including adjustments to asset allocation, increased use of active management, and changes to governance and oversight practices.

In fiscal year 2025, Connecticut’s pension funds reported an investment return of 10.14 percent.

The Treasurer’s Office also oversaw the early retirement of a portion of the state’s transportation-related debt, a move state officials said would reduce long-term interest costs and debt service obligations.

During his tenure, Russell has overseen the implementation of the Connecticut Baby Bonds program, a state-administered trust fund providing publicly funded investment accounts for children born into low-income households. Connecticut was the first state in the nation to enact a baby bonds program.

== Personal life ==
Russell's husband, Christopher Lyddy, is a former member of the Connecticut House of Representatives.

Party political offices
Preceded by Shawn Wooden	Democratic nominee for Connecticut State Treasurer; 2022, 2026	Most recent
Political offices
Preceded by Shawn Wooden	Treasurer of Connecticut; 2023–present	Incumbent
