= Shawn Wooden (politician) =

American attorney and politician

83rd Treasurer of Connecticut
- In office January 9, 2019 – January 4, 2023
- Governor: Ned Lamont
- Preceded by: Denise Nappier
- Succeeded by: Erick Russell

Personal details
- Born: 1969 or 1970 (age 56–57) Hartford, Connecticut, U.S.
- Party: Democratic
- Education: Trinity College, Connecticut (BA); New York University (JD)

Shawn T. Wooden is an American attorney and politician who served as the state treasurer of Connecticut between January 2019 and January 2023. Wooden previously served as a member of the Hartford City Council.

== Early life and career ==
Wooden attended Trinity College on a scholarship. He earned his Juris Doctor from New York University School of Law. After graduating from college and prior to attending law school, he worked for Hartford Mayor Carrie Saxon Perry. He also served as Connecticut State Director for Project VOTE and worked for the AFL-CIO's Office of Investment in Washington, D.C.

Wooden was elected to the Hartford City Council in 2011. With a one vote margin, his colleagues chose him to be City Council President in January 2012 and unanimously reelected him to the post in January 2014. While on the City Council, Wooden advocated for fiscal stability, economic development, local resident hiring, anti-violence initiatives and youth services programs. He ran for the second district seat in the Connecticut Senate in the 2014 elections, but narrowly lost to long-term incumbent Eric D. Coleman. Wooden opted not to seek reelection in 2015. He was a partner at the law firm of Day Pitney where he worked for 21 years as an investment lawyer and led the firm's public pension fund investment practice.

== State treasurer ==
In the 2018 elections, Wooden ran for Connecticut State Treasurer. He won the Democratic Party nomination, and the general election, defeating Republican Thad Gray. As state treasurer, Wooden developed a plan to divest $30 million in state funds from companies that make ammunition.

Wooden announced that he would not run for reelection in the 2022 Connecticut State Treasurer election.

Party political offices
Preceded by Denise Nappier	Democratic nominee for Connecticut State Treasurer; 2018	Succeeded by Erick Russell
Political offices
Preceded by Denise Nappier	Treasurer of Connecticut; 2019–2023	Succeeded by Erick Russell
