= Connecticut State Treasurer =

Position

State Treasurer of Connecticut
- Seal of the State Treasurer

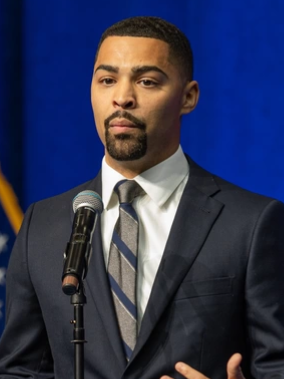
- Incumbent; Erick Russell since 2023
- Formation: 1639
- First holder: Thomas Welles
- Website: portal.ct.gov/OTT

The Connecticut state treasurer serves the office of treasurer for the state of Connecticut.

== List of state treasurers ==
| # | Image | Name | Took office | Left office | Party |
|---|---|---|---|---|---|
| 1 | | Thomas Welles | 1639 | 1641 | |
| 2 | | William Whiting | 1641 | 1648 | |
| 3 | | Thomas Welles | 1648 | 1652 | |
| 4 | | John Talcott, Sr. | 1652 | 1660 | |
| 5 | | John Talcott, Jr. | 1660 | 1676 | |
| 6 | | William Pitkin | 1676 | 1679 | |
| 7 | | Joseph Whiting | 1679 | 1718 | |
| 8 | | John Whiting | 1718 | 1750 | |
| 9 | | Nathaniel Stanly | 1750 | 1756 | |
| 10 | | Joseph Talcott | 1756 | 1769 | |
| 11 | | John Lawrence | 1769 | 1789 | |
| 12 | | Jedediah Huntington | 1789 | 1790 | |
| 13 | | Peter Colt | 1790 | 1794 | |
| 14 | | Andrew Kingsbury | 1794 | 1818 | |
| 15 | | Isaac Spencer | 1818 | 1835 | |
| 16 | | Jeremiah Brown | 1835 | 1838 | |
| 17 | | Hiram Ryder | 1838 | 1842 | |
| 18 | | Jabez L. White, Jr. | 1842 | 1844 | |
| 19 | | Joseph B. Gilbert | 1844 | 1846 | |
| 20 | | Alonzo W. Birge | 1846 | 1847 | |
| 21 | | Joseph B. Gilbert | 1847 | 1849 | |
| 22 | | Henry D. Smith | 1849 | 1851 | |
| 23 | | Thomas Clark | 1851 | 1852 | |
| 24 | | Edwin Stearns | 1852 | 1854 | |
| 25 | | Daniel Camp | 1854 | 1855 | |
| 26 | | Arthur B. Calef | 1855 | 1856 | |
| 27 | | Frederick P. Coe | 1856 | 1857 | |
| 28 | | Frederick S. Wildman | 1857 | 1858 | |
| 29 | | Lucius J. Hendee | 1858 | 1861 | |
| 30 | | Ezra Dean | 1861 | 1862 | |
| 31 | | Gabriel W. Coite | 1862 | 1866 | |
| 32 | | Henry G. Taintor | 1866 | 1867 | |
| 33 | | Edward S. Moseley | 1867 | 1869 | |
| 34 | | David P. Nichols | 1869 | 1870 | |
| 35 | | Charles M. Pond | 1870 | 1871 | |
| 36 | | David P. Nichols | 1871 | 1873 | |
| 37 | | William E. Raymond | 1873 | 1877 | |
| 38 | | Edwin A. Buck | 1877 | 1879 | |
| 39 | | Talmadge Baker | 1879 | 1881 | |
| 40 | | David P. Nichols | 1881 | January 2, 1882 | Republican |
| 41 | | James D. Smith | 1882 | 1883 | Republican |
| 42 | | Alfred R. Goodrich | 1883 | 1885 | Democratic |
| 43 | | V. B. Chamberlain | 1885 | 1887 | Republican |
| 44 | | Alexander Warner | 1887 | 1889 | Republican |
| 44 | | E. Stevens Henry | 1889 | 1893 | Republican |
| 45 | | Marvin H. Sanger | 1893 | 1895 | Democratic |
| 46 | | George W. Hodge | 1895 | 1897 | Republican |
| 47 | | Charles W. Grosvenor | 1897 | 1899 | Republican |
| 48 | | Charles S. Mersick | 1899 | 1901 | Republican |
| 49 | | Henry H. Gallup | 1901 | 1905 | Republican |
| 50 | | James F. Walsh | 1905 | 1907 | Republican |
| 51 | | Freeman F. Patten | 1907 | 1911 | Republican |
| 52 | | Costello Lippitt | 1911 | 1913 | Republican |
| 53 | | Edward S. Roberts | 1913 | 1915 | Democratic |
| 54 | | F. S. Chamberlain | 1915 | 1919 | Republican |
| 55 | | G. Harold Gilpatric | 1919 | 1924 | Republican |
| 56 | | Anson T. McCook | 1924 | 1924 | Republican |
| 57 | | Ernest E. Rogers | 1925 | 1929 | Republican |
| 58 | | Samuel R. Spencer | 1929 | 1931 | Republican |
| 59 | | Roy C. Wilcox | 1931 | 1933 | Republican |
| 60 | | J. William Hope | 1933 | 1935 | Republican |
| 61 | | John S. Addis | 1935 | September 29, 1937 | Democratic |
| 62 | | Thomas Hewes | 1937 | 1937 | Democratic |
| 63 | | Guy B. Holt | 1937 | 1939 | Democratic |
| 64 | | Joseph E. Talbot | 1939 | 1941 | Republican |
| 65 | | Frank M. Anastasio | 1941 | 1943 | Democratic |
| 66 | | Carl M. Sharpe | 1943 | 1945 | Republican |
| 67 | | William T. Carroll | 1945 | 1947 | Democratic |
| 68 | | Joseph A. Adorno | 1947 | 1955 | Republican |
| 69 | | John Ottaviano Jr. | 1955 | 1959 | Republican |
| 70 | | John A. Speziale | 1959 | 1961 | Democratic |
| 71 | | Donald J. Irwin | 1961 | 1963 | Democratic |
| 72 | | Gerald A. Lamb | 1963 | 1970 | Democratic |
| 73 | | John A. Iorio | 1970 | 1971 | Democratic |
| 74 | | Robert I. Berdon | 1971 | 1973 | Republican |
| 75 | | Alden A. Ives | 1973 | 1975 | Republican |
| 76 | | Henry E. Parker | 1975 | 1986 | Democratic |
| 77 | | Joan R. Kemler | 1986 | 1987 | Democratic |
| 78 | | Francisco L. Borges | 1987 | 1993 | Democratic |
| 79 | | Joseph M. Suggs Jr. | 1993 | 1995 | Democratic |
| 80 | | Christopher B. Burnham | 1995 | 1997 | Republican |
| 81 | | Paul J. Silvester | 1997 | 1999 | Republican |
| 82 | | Denise Nappier | 1999 | 2019 | Democratic |
| 83 | | Shawn Wooden | 2019 | 2023 | Democratic |
| 84 | | Erick Russell | 2023 | present | Democratic |
