= Indirect economic effects of the subprime mortgage crisis =

This article is a subordinate article to the subprime mortgage crisis. It covers some of the miscellaneous effects of the crisis in more detail, to preserve the flow of the main page.

== Decline in commercial real estate market ==
A combination of factors resulting from the subprime mortgage crisis have led to problems in the commercial real estate market. According to the National Association of Realtors (NAR) there is a slowing in commercial real estate due to the tightening credit and slowing growth, the former a direct result of the subprime mortgage crisis. The NAR's chief economist, Lawrence Yun, said "Although capital remains available for residential loans, the credit crunch is pronounced in commercial lending," adding "Combined with a slowing economy, the lack of credit is curtailing activity in the commercial real estate sectors. As a result, there's been a slowdown in the net absorption of space, which is leading to higher vacancies and more modest rent growth." Patricia Nooney chair of the Realtors Commercial Alliance Committee portrayed the decline as unusual since "transactions are being curtailed not for lack of demand, but for serious challenges in obtaining financing."

Financial companies going bankrupt or being acquired has also been projected to affect commercial real estate with analysts at JP Morgan estimating office vacancies could go up 5 to 7% and rents decrease by 20%. The bankruptcy of Lehman Brothers has also been projected to cause a depreciation in the price of commercial real estate fears of the firm liquidating its holdings in commercial real estate have led to other holdings being sold in anticipation. It is also expected the unloading of Lehman's debt and equity pieces of the $22 billion purchase of Archstone could cause a similar action with apartment buildings.

== Rise in home-related crime ==
There is concern that some homeowners are turning to arson as a way to escape from mortgages they can't or refuse to pay. The FBI reports that arson grew 4% in suburbs and 2.2% in cities from 2005 to 2006. As of January 2008, the 2007 numbers were not yet available.

== Effect on municipal bonds and bond insurers ==
A secondary cause and effect of the crisis relates to the role of municipal bond "monoline" insurance corporations such as Ambac and MBIA. By insuring municipal bond issues, those bonds achieve higher debt ratings. However, some of these companies also insured CDOs backed by low-rated tranches of subprime mortgage-backed securities, and as default rates on those MBS have risen, the insurers have suffered significant losses. As a result, rating agencies have downgraded several bond insurers—as well as the bonds they insure—some to low speculative grade rating categories.

The downgrades further threaten the bond insurers because they become unable to underwrite new business going forward. The downgrades may also require financial institutions holding the bonds to lower their value or to sell them, as some entities (such as pension funds) are only allowed to hold the highest-grade bonds. The effect of such a devaluation on institutional investors and corporations holding the bonds (including major banks) has been estimated as high as $200 billion. Regulators are taking action to encourage banks to lend the required capital to certain monoline insurers, to avoid such an impact. However, rather than recapitalizing insurance units plagued by exposure to subprime related products, some insurers are focused on moving excess capital to previously dormant units that could continue to underwrite new business.

== Effect on jobs in the financial sector ==
According to Bloomberg, from July 2007 to March 2008 financial institutions laid off more than 34,000 employees. In April, job cut announcements continued with Citigroup announcing an extra 9,000 layoffs for the remainder of 2008, back in January 2008 Citigroup had already slashed 4,200 positions.

Also in April, Merrill Lynch said that it planned to terminate 2,900 jobs by the end of the year. At Bear Stearns there is fear that half of the 14,000 jobs could be eliminated once JPMorgan Chase completes its acquisition. Also that month, Wachovia cut 500 investment banker positions, Washington Mutual cut its payroll by 3,000 workers and the Financial Times reported that RBS may cut up to 7,000 job positions worldwide. According to the Department of Labor, from August 2007 until August 2008 financial institutions have slashed over 65,400 jobs in the United States.

== Effects on Individuals ==
=== Decline in homeowners net worth ===
According to the S&P/Case-Shiller housing price index, by November 2007, average U.S. housing prices had fallen approximately 8% from their mid-2006 peak and by June 2008 this was approximately 20%. Sales volume (units) of new homes dropped by 26.4% in 2007 versus the prior year. By January 2008, the inventory of unsold new homes stood at 9.8 months based in December 2007 sales volume, the highest level since 1981.

Housing prices are expected to continue declining until this inventory of surplus homes (excess supply) is reduced to more typical levels. As MBS and CDO valuation is related to the value of the underlying housing collateral, MBS and CDO losses will continue until housing prices stabilize.

As home prices have declined following the rise of home prices caused by speculation and as re-financing standards have tightened, a number of homes have been foreclosed and sit vacant. These vacant homes are often poorly maintained and sometimes attract squatters and/or criminal activity with the result that increasing foreclosures in a neighborhood often serve to further accelerate home price declines in the area. Rents have not fallen as much as home prices with the result that in some affluent neighborhoods homes that were formerly owner occupied are now occupied by renters. In select areas falling home prices along with a decline in the U.S. dollar have encouraged foreigners to buy homes for either occasional use and/or long-term investments.

Additional problems are anticipated in the future from the impending retirement of the baby boomer generation. A 2006 study by the Securities Industry Association found a significant proportion of baby boomers were not saving adequately for retirement and planned to use their increased property value as a "piggy bank" or replacement for a retirement-savings account. This is a departure from the traditional American approach to homes where "people worked toward paying off the family house so they could hand it down to their children".

=== Minority home ownership ===
There is a disproportionate level of foreclosures in some minority neighborhoods. The buyers were more likely to have obtained their loans from subprime lenders. Both legal and illegal immigrants are increasingly in danger of losing their jobs and their homes.

About 46% of Hispanics and 55% of African Americans who obtained mortgages in 2005 got higher-cost loans compared with about 17% of whites and Asians, according to Federal Reserve data. [Other studies indicate they would have qualified for lower-rate loans. This is a subjective comment. It would be greatly enhanced by a quantitative assessment.]

As many as 40% of all subprime mortgages nationwide are held by Hispanics.

In New York City, for example, an analysis by the Furman Center for Real Estate and Urban Policy found that around 30% of subprime loans issued between 2004 and 2006 were made to Hispanics, and 40% of such loans were given to African Americans. Asians received around 10% of subprime loans, as did Whites. Whites and Asians have a lower percentage because they did not need these types of loans. They could prove their income and could actually afford the houses.

=== Evictions of renters ===
Many renters have been evicted from their homes, often without notice, following foreclosures because their landlords had defaulted on loans. According to a January 2008 study by the Mortgage Bankers Association, one out of every seven Maryland homes that lenders began foreclosure proceedings on the preceding summer was not occupied by the owner. Foreclosure voids any lease agreement, and renters have no legal right to continue renting.

In October 2008, responding to a dramatic increase in such evictions since 2006, Tom Dart, the elected Sheriff of Cook County, Illinois, decided to take a stand on the issue. He criticized mortgage companies for failing to fulfill their obligation to identify renters in foreclosed properties, and announced that he was suspending all foreclosure evictions immediately. The Illinois Banker's Association accused Dart of engaging in "vigilantism".

In Boston, MA, the community activist group City Life/Vida Urbana has organized tenants facing eviction because of foreclosure of their property and, in many cases, forestalled or prevented the eviction through protests and legal actions.
