= List of writedowns due to subprime crisis =

Write-downs on the value of loans, MBS and CDOs due to the subprime mortgage crisis.

Company	Business Type	Loss (Billion USD)	References
(Switzerland) UBS	bank	$37.7 bln	
(United States) Citigroup	bank	$39.1 bln	
(United States) Merrill Lynch	investment bank	$29.1 bln	
(United States) Morgan Stanley	investment bank	$11.5 bln	
(France) Crédit Agricole	bank	$4.8 bln	
(United Kingdom) HSBC	bank	$20.4 bln	
(United States) Bank of America	bank	$7.95 bln	
(Canada) Canadian Imperial Bank of Commerce	bank	$3.2 bln	
(Germany) Deutsche Bank	bank	$7.7 bln	
(Japan) Mizuho Financial Group	bank	$5.5 bln	
(United Kingdom) Barclays	bank	$3.1 bln	
(United States) Bear Stearns	investment bank	$2.6 bln	
(United Kingdom) Royal Bank of Scotland	bank	$15.2 bln	
(United States) Washington Mutual	savings and loan	$2.4 bln	
(Switzerland) Swiss Re	reinsurance	$2.04 bln	
(United States) Lehman Brothers	investment bank	$3.93 bln	
(Germany) Landesbank Baden-Württemberg	bank	$1.1 bln	
(United States) JPMorgan	bank	$5.5 bln	
(United States) Goldman Sachs	investment bank	$1.5 bln	
(United States) Freddie Mac	mortgage GSE	$4.3 bln	
(Switzerland) Credit Suisse	bank	$9.0 bln	
(United States) Wells Fargo	bank	$2.9 bln	
(United States) Wachovia	bank	$11.1 bln	
Royal Bank of Canada	bank	$1.2 bln	
(United States) Fannie Mae	mortgage GSE	$0.896 bln	
(United States) Municipal Bond Insurance Association	bond insurance	$3.3 bln	
(Germany) Hypo Real Estate	bank	$0.580 bln	
(United States) Ambac Financial Group	bond insurance	$3.5 bln	
(Germany) Commerzbank	bank	$1.1 bln	
(France) Société Générale	bank	$3.0 bln	
(France) BNP Paribas	bank	$0.870 bln	
(Germany) WestLB	bank	$2.74 bln	
(United States) AIG	insurance	$11.1 bln	
(Germany) Landesbank Bayern	bank	$6.7 bln	
(France) Natixis	bank	$1.75 bln	
(United States) Countrywide Financial	mortgage bank	$4.0 bln	
(Germany) DZ Bank	bank	$2.1 bln	
(Belgium) Fortis	bank	$2.3 bln	
(India) ICICI Bank	bank	$0.264 bln	
(Germany) IKB Deutsche Industriebank	bank	$3.45 bln	
(Japan) Aozora Bank	bank	$0.397 bln	
(Germany) Dresdner Bank	bank	$3.49 bln	
(United Kingdom) Lloyds Banking Group	bank	$8.38 bln	
Bank of China	bank	$2.0 bln	
Industrial and Commercial Bank of China	bank	$0.448 bln	

- Bloomberg, May 19, 2008
- Bloomberg, August 12, 2008 (commentary )
