= 1986 Connecticut State Treasurer election =

- November 4, 1986

Nominee	Francisco L. Borges	Sebastian Garafalo
Party	Democratic	Republican
Popular vote	511,252	407,956
Percentage	55.0%	43.9%
- Borges: 40–50% 50–60% 60–70% 70–80% 80–90% Garafalo: 40–50% 50–60% 60–70%
State Treasurer before election
Joan R. Kemler (Note: Appointed following the resignation of Henry E. Parker in February 1986)
Democratic
Elected State Treasurer
Francisco L. Borges
Democratic

The 1986 Connecticut State Treasurer election took place on November 4, 1986, to elect the Connecticut State Treasurer. Democratic nominee, Francisco L. Borges, a former Hartford city councilman and deputy mayor, defeated Republican nominee, Middletown mayor Sebastian Garafalo

Incumbent treasurer Joan R. Kemler was appointed by Governor William A. O'Neill following the resignation of Henry E. Parker. As part of her appointment, Kemler agreed not to seek election for a full term.

== Democratic primary ==
=== Candidates ===
Despite entering the race a year earlier and raising more money, Rep. Maurice B. Mosley lost at the Democratic convention to Francisco L. Borges, but received enough delegate votes to force a primary. While initially planning to force a primary, Mosley withdrew his candidacy in August.

==== Nominee ====
- Francisco L. Borges, former Hartford city councilman and deputy mayor.

==== Eliminated in primary ====
- Maurice B. Mosley, state representative from the 72nd district.

=== Convention ===
Democratic convention, July 19
Candidate	Round 1	
Candidate	Votes	%
Francisco L. Borges	796	59.94%
Maurice B. Mosley	532	40.06%

== Republican primary ==
=== Candidates ===
==== Nominee ====
- Sebastian Garafalo, Mayor of Middletown.

== Third-party candidates and independent candidates ==
=== Libertarian Party ===
Nominee

- Thomas Ross, sales manager.

=== Independent ===
Nominee

- W. Leroy Staib, manufacturing engineer.

== General election ==
=== Results ===
1986 Connecticut State Treasurer election
Party	Candidate	Votes	%	±%
Democratic	Francisco L. Borges	511,252	55.02%	+0.27%
Republican	Sebastian Garafalo	407,956	43.91%	+0.21%
Libertarian	Thomas Ross	5,733	0.62%	−0.40%
Independent	W. Leroy Staib	4,186	0.45%	N/A
Total votes		929,127	100.0%	
Democratic hold				

==== By county ====
Borges won six of eight counties, while Garafalo won the other two.

County	Francisco L. Borges Democratic		Sebastian Garafalo Republican		Other parties Independent		Total votes cast		
County	Fairfield	105,310	47.62%	113,501	51.33%	2,313	Total votes cast	1.04%	221,124
Hartford	151,049	60.01%	97,927	38.91%	2,726	1.08%	251,702		
Litchfield	25,326	48.16%	26,601	50.58%	661	1.26%	52,588		
Middlesex	23,219	49.88%	22,839	49.07%	488	1.05%	46,546		
New Haven	131,366	57.33%	95,549	41.70%	2,231	0.97%	229,147		
New London	38,208	58.11%	26,799	40.76%	745	1.13%	65,752		
Tolland	20,293	58.22%	14,128	40.54%	432	1.24%	34,853		
Windham	16,481	60.11%	10,612	38.71%	323	1.18%	27,416		
Total	511,252	55.02%	407,956	43.91%	9,919	1.07%	929,127		

Counties that flipped from Democratic to Republican

- Litchfield (largest town: Torrington)

==== By congressional district ====
Borges won five of the six congressional districts, while Garafalo won one. Two of the five districts won by Borges elected Republican U.S. Representatives.

District	Francisco L. Borges Democratic		Sebastian Garafalo Republican		Other parties Independent		Total votes cast	Representative
District	#	%	#	%	#	%	Total votes cast	Representative
1st	103,277	62.25%	61,064	36.80%	1,570	0.95%	165,911	Barbara Kennelly
2nd	87,371	56.62%	65,164	42.23%	1,778	1.15%	154,313	Sam Gejdenson
3rd	91,056	58.14%	64,047	40.89%	1,516	0.97%	156,619	Bruce Morrison
4th	66,238	49.16%	67,259	49.92%	1,232	0.92%	134,729	Stewart McKinney
5th	78,415	50.74%	74,310	48.09%	1,808	1.17%	154,533	John G. Rowland
6th	84,895	52.07%	76,112	46.69%	2,015	1.24%	163,022	Nancy Johnson
Totals	511,252	55.02%	407,956	43.91%	9,919	1.07%	929,127	
