= Berkshire Hathaway Assurance =

Bond insurance company

- Company type: Private
- Industry: Insurance
- Founded: December 2007; 18 years ago in Omaha, Nebraska, United States
- Key people: Sunil Khanna (Senior Vice President); Forrest Krutter (Senior Vice President); Kara Raiguel (Vice President); Brian Snover (Vice President)
- Owner: Berkshire Hathaway
- Parent: National Indemnity

Berkshire Hathaway Assurance is a bond insurance company created by Berkshire Hathaway, Inc. in December 2007.

== History ==
Berkshire created this government bond insurance company in December 2007 to insure municipal and state bonds. These type bonds are issued by local governments to finance public works projects such as schools, hospitals, roads, and sewer systems. BHA began insurance operations in New York, with plans to move on to California, Puerto Rico, Texas, Illinois, and Florida. On February 12, 2008, Warren Buffett announced a plan to add up to $5 billion in capital to BHA to enable it to provide reinsurance on municipal bonds currently guaranteed by Ambac, MBIA, and Financial Guaranty Insurance Company. Buffet also announced BHA had closed its first deal to insure $50 million in debt for a 2% fee. In 2014, Moody's said its credit rating was Aa1. It also has a rating of AAA from S&P.
