= 1994 Connecticut State Treasurer election =

- November 8, 1994
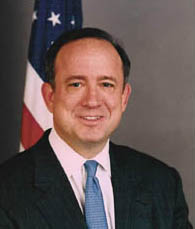

Nominee	Chris Burnham	Joseph M. Suggs Jr.
Party	Republican	Democratic
Alliance		A Connecticut Party
Popular vote	526,200	441,263
Percentage	53.1%	44.5%
- Burnham: 40–50% 50–60% 60–70% 70–80% Suggs: 40–50% 50–60% 60–70% 70–80%
State Treasurer before election
Joseph M. Suggs Jr.
Democratic
Elected State Treasurer
Chris Burnham
Republican

The 1994 Connecticut State Treasurer election took place on November 8, 1994, to elect the Connecticut State Treasurer. Incumbent Democratic State Treasurer Joseph M. Suggs Jr. was appointed to the office by the Connecticut General Assembly to complete the term of Francisco L. Borges, who resigned to become an executive at the New York-based Financial Guaranty Insurance Company.

Suggs lost election to a full term to Republican nominee Chris Burnham. As of 2026, this was the last time a Republican was elected Connecticut State Treasurer.

== Democratic primary ==
=== Candidates ===
==== Nominee ====
- Joseph M. Suggs Jr., incumbent state treasurer (1993–1995)

== Republican primary ==
=== Candidates ===
==== Nominee ====
- Chris Burnham, former state representative from the 147th district (1987–1993)

== Third-party candidates and independent candidates ==
=== A Connecticut Party ===
A Connecticut Party endorsed Suggs, giving him access to an additional ballot line. Suggs received nearly a quarter of his total vote share under A Connecticut Party.

Official designee

- Joseph M. Suggs Jr., incumbent state treasurer (1993–1995)

=== Concerned Citizens Party ===
Nominee

- Christopher C. Hebert

== General election ==
=== Results ===
1994 Connecticut State Treasurer election
Party	Candidate	Votes	%	±%
Republican	Chris Burnham	526,200	53.06%	
Democratic	Joseph M. Suggs Jr.	331,037	33.38%	
A Connecticut Party	Joseph M. Suggs Jr.	110,226	11.12%	
Total	Joseph M. Suggs Jr.	441,263	44.50%	
Concerned Citizens	Christopher C. Hebert	24,207	2.44%	
Total votes		991,670	100.0%	
Republican gain from Democratic				

=== By congressional district ===
Burnham won four of six congressional districts, including one that elected a Democrat.

District	Suggs Jr.	Burnham	Representative
1st	51%	47%	Barbara Kennelly
2nd	47%	50%	Sam Gejdenson
3rd	50%	48%	Rosa DeLauro
4th	39%	60%	Chris Shays
5th	38%	60%	Gary Franks
6th	42%	55%	Nancy Johnson
