= BHA =

BHA may refer to:

== Businesses and organisations ==
- Berkshire Hathaway Assurance, an American company
- Backcountry Hunters & Anglers, Montana, U.S.
- Boston Housing Authority, an American public agency
- Brighter Horizons Academy, an Islamic college in Garland, Texas, U.S.
- Brighton & Hove Albion F.C., an English association football club
- British Homeopathic Association
- British Horseracing Authority, a regulatory body
- British Hospitality Association, an industry association
- British Humanist Association (now Humanists UK)
- Buddha Air, a Nepalese airline, ICAO code BHA
- Bush Heritage Australia, a conservation non-profit

== Science and technology ==
- Beta hydroxy acid, a type of organic compound
- Bottom hole assembly, a component of a drilling rig
- Butylated hydroxyanisole, a food additive
- BHA (for "Butt-Head Astronomer"), a code-name for the Power Macintosh 7100 computer

== Other uses ==
- Bahamas (UNDP country code BHA)
- Bibliography of the History of Art, an electronic database by Getty Research Institute
- Los Perales Airport, Bahía de Caráquez, Ecuador (IATA code: BHA)
- Area code 242 for The Bahamas (North American dialling code:BHA)
- Bharia language (ISO 939-3 code: bha)
- Binhai railway station (China Railway Pinyin code:BHA)
- Bureau for Humanitarian Assistance of USAID
- Bute House Agreement, a former power-sharing agreement in the Scottish government
