= 1982 Connecticut State Treasurer election =

- November 2, 1982
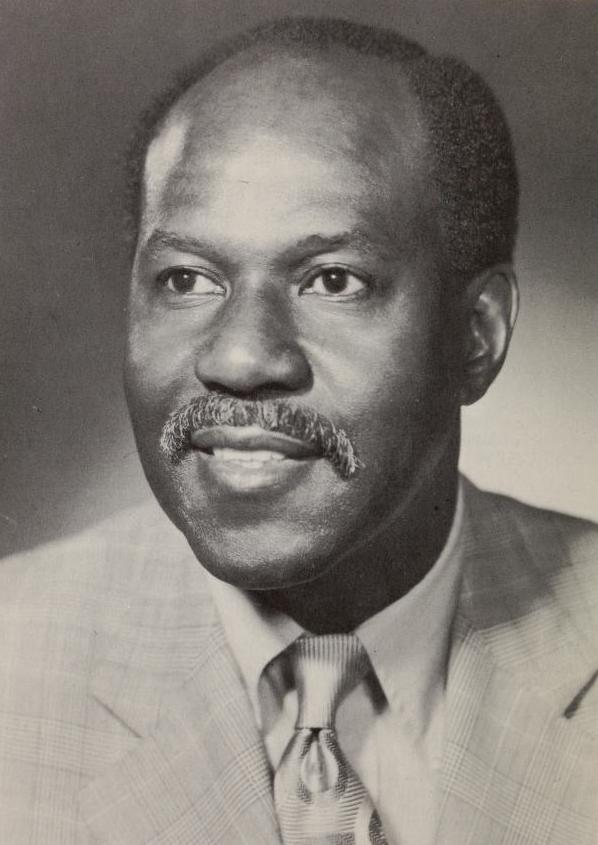

Nominee	Henry E. Parker	John T. Becker
Party	Democratic	Republican
Popular vote	564,677	450,674
Percentage	54.7%	43.7%
- Parker: 40–50% 50–60% 60–70% 70–80% 80–90% Becker: 40–50% 50–60% 60–70% 70–80%
State Treasurer before election
Henry E. Parker
Democratic
Elected State Treasurer
Henry E. Parker
Democratic

The 1982 Connecticut State Treasurer election took place on November 2, 1982, to elect the Connecticut State Treasurer. Incumbent Democratic State Treasurer, Henry E. Parker won re-election to a third term, defeating Republican nominee, John T. Becker, a Greenwich based businessman.

== Democratic primary ==
=== Candidates ===
==== Nominee ====
- Henry E. Parker, incumbent state treasurer (1975–1986)

== Republican primary ==
=== Candidates ===
==== Nominee ====
- John T. Becker, owner of WGCH radio station, former member of the Republican State Central Committee, and former Greenwich town chairman

== Third-party candidates and independent candidates ==
=== Libertarian Party ===
Nominee

- Louis Garofalo, insurance salesman and founder of Ridgefield Taxpayers' League

=== Conservative Party ===
Nominee

- William Krones, professional campaign worker

== General election ==
=== Results ===
1982 Connecticut State Treasurer election
Party	Candidate	Votes	%	±%
Democratic	Henry E. Parker (Incumbent)	564,677	54.75%	−2.60%
Republican	John T. Becker	450,674	43.70%	+1.05%
Libertarian	Louis Garofalo	10,497	1.02%	N/A
Conservative	William Krones	5,440	0.53%	N/A
Write-in	N/A	35	<0.01%	N/A
Total votes		1,031,323	100.0%	
Democratic hold				

==== By county ====
Parker won seven of eight counties, while Becker won one.

County	Henry E. Parker Democratic		John T. Becker Republican		Other parties Independent		Total votes cast		
County	Fairfield	114,582	45.83%	130,965	52.38%	4,484	Total votes cast	1.79%	250,031
Hartford	167,450	59.94%	107,938	38.63%	4,000	1.43%	279,388		
Litchfield	29,846	50.59%	28,201	47.81%	945	1.05%	58,992		
Middlesex	26,551	56.76%	19,326	41.32%	899	1.92%	46,776		
New Haven	148,917	57.45%	106,895	41.24%	3,417	1.32%	259,229		
New London	39,674	56.32%	29,673	42.12%	1,100	1.56%	70,447		
Tolland	21,394	55.56%	16,413	42.63%	696	1.81%	38,503		
Windham	16,263	58.24%	11,263	40.34%	396	1.42%	27,922		
Total	564,677	54.75%	450,674	43.70%	15,972 (Note: This includes 35 write-in votes, which were not attributed to a specific district/county)	1.53%	1,031,323		

Counties that flipped from Democratic to Republican

- Fairfield (largest town: Bridgeport)

==== By congressional district ====
Parker won five of the six congressional districts, while Becker won one. One of the five districts won by Parker elected a Republican U.S. Representative.

District	Henry E. Parker Democratic		John T. Becker Republican		Other parties Independent		Total votes cast	Representative
District	#	%	#	%	#	%	Total votes cast	Representative
1st	110,020	61.00%	67,719	37.55%	2,611	1.45%	180,350	Barbara Kennelly
2nd	92,783	56.58%	68,456	41.75%	2,744	1.67%	163,983	Sam Gejdenson
3rd	98,303	56.00%	75,120	42.80%	2,103	1.20%	175,526	Larry DeNardis (97th Congress)
3rd	98,303	56.00%	75,120	42.80%	2,103	1.20%	175,526	Bruce Morrison (98th Congress)
4th	74,999	47.05%	81,799	51.32%	2,595	1.63%	159,393	Stewart McKinney
5th	88,358	52.63%	76,466	45.54%	3,071	1.83%	167,895	William R. Ratchford
6th	100,214	54.42%	81,114	44.05%	2,813	1.53%	184,141	Toby Moffett (97th Congress)
6th	100,214	54.42%	81,114	44.05%	2,813	1.53%	184,141	Nancy Johnson (98th Congress)
Totals	564,677	54.75%	450,674	43.70%	16,005	1.53%	1,031,323	
