= 2014 Connecticut State Treasurer election =

- November 4, 2014

Nominee	Denise L. Nappier	Timothy M. Herbst
Party	Democratic	Republican
Alliance	Working Families	Independent Party
Popular vote	533,182	514,402
Percentage	50.9%	49.1%
- Nappier: 50–60% 60–70% 70–80% 80–90% Herbst: 50–60% 60–70% 70–80%
State Treasurer before election
Denise L. Nappier
Democratic
Elected State Treasurer
Denise L. Nappier
Democratic

The 2014 Connecticut State Treasurer election took place on November 4, 2014, to elect the Connecticut State Treasurer. Incumbent Democratic State Treasurer Denise L. Nappier won re-election to a fifth term, defeating Republican first selectman of Trumbull Timothy M. Herbst.

Despite her victory, this was Nappier's closest state treasurer race since she was first elected in 1998. In addition, this election was the first time that Nappier lost Tolland and Middlesex counties.

== Democratic primary ==
=== Candidates ===
==== Nominee ====
- Denise L. Nappier, incumbent state treasurer (1999–2019)

== Republican primary ==
=== Candidates ===
==== Nominee ====
- Timothy M. Herbst, first selectman of Trumbull

== Third-party candidates and independent candidates ==
=== Working Families Party ===
The Working Families Party endorsed Nappier, giving her access to an additional ballot line.

Nominee

- Denise L. Nappier, incumbent state treasurer (1999–2019)

=== Independent Party ===
The Independent Party endorsed Herbst, giving him access to an additional ballot line.

Nominee

- Timothy M. Herbst, first selectman of Trumbull

=== Write-in candidates ===
- Rolf Maurer, Green Party nominee for state comptroller in 2014, state representative from the 148th district in 2010 and 2012, and mayor of Stamford in 2009

== General election ==
=== Results ===
2014 Connecticut State Treasurer election
Party	Candidate	Votes	%	±%
Democratic	Denise L. Nappier	499,048	47.63%	
Working Families	Denise L. Nappier	34,134	3.26%	
Total	Denise L. Nappier (incumbent)	533,182	50.89%	
Republican	Timothy M. Herbst	481,323	45.94%	
Independent Party	Timothy M. Herbst	33,079	3.16%	
Total	Timothy M. Herbst	514,402	49.10%	
Write-in	Rolf Maurer (Green)	119	0.01%	
Total votes		1,047,703	100.0%	
Democratic hold				

==== By congressional district ====
Despite losing the state, Herbst won three of five congressional districts, all of which elected Democrats.

District	Nappier	Herbst	Representative
1st	53%	47%	John B. Larson
2nd	49%	51%	Joe Courtney
3rd	57%	43%	Rosa DeLauro
4th	48%	52%	Jim Himes
5th	47%	53%	Elizabeth Esty
