= 2010 Connecticut State Treasurer election =

- November 2, 2010

Nominee	Denise L. Nappier	Jeff Wright
Party	Democratic	Republican
Alliance	Working Families
Popular vote	600,270	480,623
Percentage	54.3%	43.5%
- Nappier: 40–50% 50–60% 60–70% 70–80% 80–90% Wright: 40–50% 50–60% 60–70% 70–80%
State Treasurer before election
Denise L. Nappier
Democratic
Elected State Treasurer
Denise L. Nappier
Democratic

The 2010 Connecticut State Treasurer election took place on November 2, 2010, to elect the Connecticut State Treasurer. Incumbent Democratic State Treasurer Denise L. Nappier won re-election to a fourth term, defeating Republican mayor of Newington Jeff Wright.

== Democratic primary ==
=== Candidates ===
==== Nominee ====
- Denise L. Nappier, incumbent state treasurer (1999–2019)

== Republican primary ==
=== Candidates ===
==== Nominee ====
- Jeff Wright, mayor of Newington and financial planner

==== Eliminated at convention ====
- Andrew Grant White, hedge fund portfolio manager from Ridgefield

=== Endorsements ===
Jeff Wright

Local officials

- Louis Spadaccini, mayor of Manchester

=== Convention ===
The Republican statewide nominating convention was held on May 22, 2010.

Newington Mayor Jeff Wright won the party's endorsement overwhelmingly with 91% over hedge fund portfolio manager Andrew White of Ridgefield. Wright initially ran for governor but withdrew from the race to run for state treasurer in late March. The two candidates' similar last names confused some delegates at the convention.

White did not receive enough votes to qualify for a primary but went on to win the nomination of the Independent Party, making it onto the general election ballot.

== Third-party candidates and independent candidates ==
=== Working Families Party ===
The Working Families Party endorsed Nappier, giving her access to an additional ballot line.

Nominee

- Denise L. Nappier, incumbent state treasurer (1999–2019)

=== Independent Party ===
The Independent Party nominated Andrew Grant White, who lost the Republican nomination to Newington Mayor Jeff Wright.

Nominee

- Andrew Grant White, hedge fund portfolio manager from Ridgefield

=== Green Party ===
Nominee

- S. David Bue, nominee for state treasurer in 2006 and fiduciary investment advisor from Westport

== General election ==
=== Results ===
2010 Connecticut State Treasurer election
Party	Candidate	Votes	%	±%
Democratic	Denise L. Nappier	573,746	51.87%	
Working Families	Denise L. Nappier	26,524	2.40%	
Total	Denise L. Nappier (incumbent)	600,270	54.27%	
Republican	Jeff Wright	480,623	43.45%	
Independent Party	Andrew Grant White	15,611	1.41%	
Green	S. David Bue	9,600	0.87%	
Total votes		1,106,104	100.0%	
Democratic hold				

==== By congressional district ====
Nappier won four of five congressional districts, with Wright winning the remaining one, which elected a Democrat.

District	Nappier	Wright	Representative
1st	60%	38%	John B. Larson
2nd	55%	44%	Joe Courtney
3rd	58%	39%	Rosa DeLauro
4th	48%	50%	Jim Himes
5th	50%	47%	Chris Murphy
