= China United SME Guarantee Corporation =

Chinese financial services company

China United SME Guarantee Corporation 中合中小企业融资担保股份有限公司
- Company type: State-owned enterprises
- Headquarters: Beijing, People's Republic of China
- Products: Bond insurance; loan guarantees

China United SME Guarantee Corporation
- Traditional Chinese: 中合中小企業融資擔保股份有限公司
- Simplified Chinese: 中合中小企业融资担保股份有限公司
Transcriptions
Standard Mandarin
- Hanyu Pinyin: Zhōnghé Zhōngxiǎo Qǐyè Róngzī Dānbǎo Gǔfèn Yǒuxiàn Gōngsī

China United SME Guarantee Corporation, commonly known as Sino Guarantee) is a Chinese financial services company that provides financial guarantees for loans and bonds. Its key shareholder is the Export Import Bank of China, one of China's main policy banks. The company is described by Moody's as playing a quasi-policy role in Chinese capital markets as its creation was guided by the National Development and Reform Commission, China's key government body for economic planning.
