= Bradford Higgins =

Former American government official

Assistant Secretary of State for Resource Management
- In office February 21, 2006 – January 20, 2009
- President: George W. Bush
- Preceded by: Christopher Burnham
- Succeeded by: James L. Millette

Personal details
- Born: 1952 (age 73–74)
- Party: Republican
- Education: Columbia University (BA, JD)

Bradford R. Higgins (born 1952) is an American lawyer, investment banker, and former American government official who served as Assistant Secretary of State for Resource Management and Chief Financial Officer of the United States Department of State from 2006 to 2009.

== Biography ==
Higgins received his B.A. (1974) from and J.D. (1978) from Columbia University.

He started his career as an associate at the law firm Simpson Thacher & Bartlett in New York City. He worked at Credit Suisse First Boston where he was a managing director and manager of the municipal utility and infrastructure groups. He also worked at Goldman Sachs where he was the co-head of the tax-exempt energy group. He then joined Bear Stearns Asset Management as managing director in charge of marketing to public sector pensions.

Higgins served two tours of service in Iraq, first as Chief of Planning for the Iraq Reconstruction Management Office in Baghdad, Iraq as well as Chief Financial Officer for the Coalition Provisional Authority in Baghdad in 2004. He returned in 2005 and served as Senior Advisor to the United States Ambassador to Iraq, Zalmay Khalilzad, and as the first director of the Strategic Performance and Assessment office for the US Mission in Iraq. He was also Senior Advisor to the Assistant Secretary of State for Resource Management and Chief Financial Officer by which he led assessment teams to Iraq and resulted in a $18.4 billion Iraq reconstruction program.

He joined the United States Department of State in 2004 and was nominated Assistant Secretary of State and Chief Financial Officer on December 13, 2005, by President George W. Bush, succeeding Christopher Burnham. He was confirmed by the United States Senate on February 16, 2006, by voice vote. At the Department of State, he oversaw a $34 billion budget and directed the Department's strategic and performing efforts. In 2008, he was elected Chairman of the Audit Committee to the Organization of American States and as the senior advisor to the United States Ambassador to the Organization of American States Hector Morales.

He left the State Department on January 20, 2009.

Higgins currently serves as president and chairman of the board of JumpStart International, a humanitarian aid organization that has conducted extensive efforts in Iraq and is currently operating in Gaza. He is also a venture partner at SOSV, where he focuses on investing in energy and energy efficiency technology.

Political offices
Preceded by Christopher Burnham	Assistant Secretary of State for Resource Management; 2006-2009	Succeeded by James L. Millette
