= Cypress Group =

American private equity company

The Cypress Group
- Company type: Private
- Industry: Private equity
- Founded: 1994; 32 years ago
- Founder: Jim Stern, Jeff Hughes, Jamie Singleton and David Spalding
- Headquarters: New York, New York, United States
- Products: Leveraged buyout
- Total assets: $3.6 billion
- Number of employees: 20+
- Website: www.cypressgp.com

The Cypress Group is a private equity company focused on leveraged buyout investments in companies across a range of industry sectors. At its peak in the late 1990s and early 2000s, Cypress was among the largest US private equity firms, although by the end of the decade the firm would find itself in the process of winding down its operations.

The firm, based in New York City, was founded in 1994 by the four senior members of Lehman Brothers' merchant banking group, Jim Stern, Jeff Hughes, Jamie Singleton and David Spalding.

Cypress has raised approximately $3.6 billion since its inception across two funds raised in 1996 and 1999.

== History ==
The Cypress Group was founded in 1994 by Jim Stern, Jeff Hughes, Jamie Singleton and David Spalding, who had served previously as the senior managing directors of Lehman Brothers' merchant banking group. The four founders were responsible for restarting Lehman's merchant banking efforts after the departure of Pete Peterson and Stephen A. Schwarzman to found The Blackstone Group, a private equity and investment banking firm.

The Cypress Group raised its first institutional private equity fund in 1996 with $1.05 billion of investor commitments.

In 1999, the firm completed fundraising for Cypress Merchant Banking Partners II, with $2.5 billion of investor commitments. At the time it was raised, the firm's new fund ranked among the largest raised for leveraged buyout transactions. Ultimately, Cypress II would prove to be the firm's final fund when it announced in 2007 that it would abandon further plans to raise a successor fund.

Cypress had indicated its intentions to raise $1.5 billion. However, a series of weak investments, particularly in Cypress II, severely impacted the firm's plans to raise a third fund. By 2007, Cypress had lost a significant number of its senior investment professionals. As of 2009, the firm is still managed day-to-day by two of its original founders, Jim Stern and Jeff Hughes. David Spalding assumed a role at his alma mater Dartmouth College and Jamie Singleton still remains on the firm's board.

In October 2009, the firm's Cypress Merchant Banking Partners II will reach the end of its original 10-year term. While the firm is seeking to extend the life of the fund, investors in the fund are currently negotiating an orderly wind-down of the investments in the portfolio.

== Investments ==
Since inception in 1994, Cypress has invested more than $4 billion of equity in more than 30 companies through transactions totalling in excess of $22 billion in size. Historically, Cypress employed an industry-based investment strategy and the firm was structured into six industry groups covering large segments of the economy, including:

- Packaging, Building Products, Construction Materials & Retail
- Automotive & Aerospace/Defense
- General Industrial & Services
- Healthcare & Financial Services
- Media & Entertainment, Lodging & Leisure
- Consumer Products

Among the firm's notable investments include:

- Affinia Group
- Amtrol
- Catlin Group
- Cinemark Theatres
- Cooper Standard
- Financial Guaranty Insurance Company
- Frank's Nursery & Crafts
- Infinity Broadcasting Corporation
- Lear Corporation
- Loral Aerospace Holdings
- McBride plc
- Meow Mix
- R.P. Scherer Corporation
- Republic National Cabinet Corporation
- Scottish Re Group
- WESCO International
- Williams Scotsman
