= 1998 Connecticut State Treasurer election =

- November 3, 1998

Nominee	Denise L. Nappier	Paul J. Silvester
Party	Democratic	Republican
Popular vote	436,573	433,889
Percentage	49.0%	48.7%
- Nappier: 40–50% 50–60% 60–70% 70–80% 80–90% Silvester: 40–50% 50–60% 60–70% 70–80%
State Treasurer before election
Paul J. Silvester
Republican
Elected State Treasurer
Denise L. Nappier
Democratic

The 1998 Connecticut State Treasurer election took place on November 3, 1998, to elect the Connecticut State Treasurer. Incumbent Republican State Treasurer Paul J. Silvester was appointed to the office by Governor John G. Rowland to complete the term of Chris Burnham, who resigned to work at an investment firm.

Silvester lost election to a full term to Democratic nominee Denise L. Nappier by 2,684 votes, a margin of just 0.3%. As of 2026, this was the last time the State Treasurer of Connecticut changed partisan control.

== Republican primary ==
=== Candidates ===
==== Nominee ====
- Paul J. Silvester, incumbent state treasurer (1997–1999)

== Democratic primary ==
=== Candidates ===
==== Nominee ====
- Denise L. Nappier, Hartford City Treasurer (1989–1998), former executive director of the Hartford Riverfront Recapture, former chair of the Hartford Redevelopment Authority, and former Director of Institutional Relations for UConn Health (1981–1984)

==== Eliminated in primary ====
- Frank A. Leece

=== Endorsements ===
Denise L. Nappier

U.S. representatives

- Barbara B. Kennelly, U.S. representative from CT-01 (1982–1991), Vice Chair of the House Democratic Caucus (1995–1999), and former secretary of the state (1979–1982)

=== Convention ===
The Democratic statewide nominating convention was held on July 19, 1998.

The nomination for Secretary of the State was at the center of the race issue during the 1998 conventions. Black Democratic leaders were urging the party to nominate at least one black candidate to an otherwise all-white ticket. Incumbent Republican Governor John G. Rowland had been touting his party as the exemplar of diversity in the state, with the Republican ticket including two black and two Hispanic candidates, much to the frustration of Democrats. In response to black Democratic leaders threatening to boycott an all-white ticket, Barbara B. Kennelly, the party's nominee for governor, endorsed black candidate Denise L. Nappier.

Early delegate counts showed Nappier trailing Frank A. Leece, but she ultimately won the party's endorsement narrowly with 51% of the vote to Leece's 49%. According to NYT, "Mr. Lecce stormed from the convention hall and said he planned to wage a primary battle against Ms. Nappier on Sept. 15, which he is allowed to do under party rules." Leece, an Italian-American, had criticized the effort to usher in a candidate based on race, saying, "That's the old, antiquated way it used to be done."

=== Results ===
The Democratic primary was held on September 18, 1998.

Democratic primary results
Party	Candidate	Votes	%
Democratic	Denise L. Nappier	58,315	59.25%
Democratic	Frank A. Leece	40,114	40.75%
Total votes		98,429	100.0%

== Third-party candidates and independent candidates ==
=== Libertarian Party ===
Nominee

- Louis A. Garofalo, nominee for state treasurer in 1982

=== Concerned Citizens Party ===
Nominee

- Joseph J. Ciccomascolo

== General election ==
=== Results ===
1998 Connecticut State Treasurer election
Party	Candidate	Votes	%	±%
Democratic	Denise L. Nappier	436,573	49.00%	
Republican	Paul J. Silvester (incumbent)	433,889	48.70%	
Libertarian	Louis A. Garofalo	11,375	1.28%	
Concerned Citizens	Joseph J. Ciccomascolo	9,051	1.02%	
Total votes		890,888	100.0%	
Democratic gain from Republican				

=== By congressional district ===
Nappier won three of six congressional districts, with the remaining three going to Silvester, including one that elected a Democrat.

District	Silvester	Nappier	Representative
1st	42%	56%	Barbara Kennelly (105th Congress)
1st	42%	56%	John Larson (106th Congress)
2nd	45%	53%	Sam Gejdenson
3rd	44%	53%	Rosa DeLauro
4th	52%	45%	Chris Shays
5th	56%	41%	James Maloney
6th	53%	45%	Nancy Johnson

== Aftermath ==
Soon after leaving office in January 1999, both the FBI and SEC began investigating Paul J. Silvester and his close associates due to fundraising irregularities. The State Elections Enforcement Commission determined that Silvester and several of his associates made illegal contributions to Paul Silvester for State Treasurer during his 1998 campaign.

Incoming State Treasurer Denise L. Nappier discovered a scheme in which Silvester had transferred a significant portion of the State Retirement and Trust Fund into illiquid private equity investments, which disrupted the State's investment strategy and threatened long-term financial stability. Silvester was accused of diverting these funds to specific investment firms in return for kickbacks, primarily coming in the form of no-work consulting and lobbying contracts provided to Silvester and close associates. The scheme was alleged to have netted $2.25 million in false fees and kickbacks.

In 2003, Silvester pleaded guilty and was sentenced to 51 months in prison, a lenient sentence as Silvester agreed to cooperate with a larger investigation into racketeering and government corruption. Other convicted individuals included Silvester's brother, Mark Silvester, Assistant State Treasurer George Gomes, former Connecticut Senate Majority Leader William A. DiBella, and Republican nominee for secretary of the state in 1998, Ben Andrews.
