= Christopher Burnham =

American politician (born 1956)

Chris Burnham
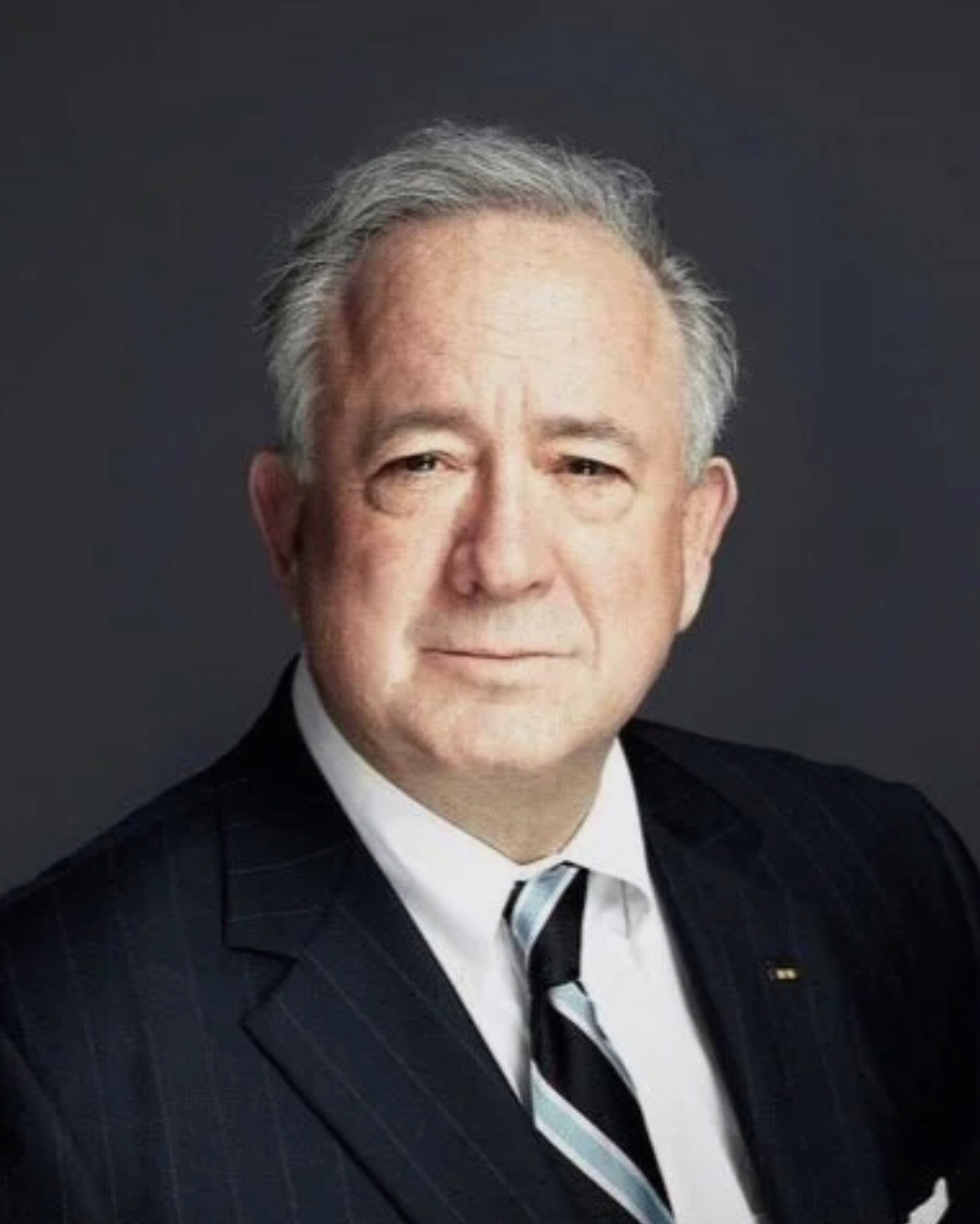

Under Secretary General of the United Nations for Management
- In office June 1, 2005 – November 15, 2006
- Secretary General: Kofi Annan
- Preceded by: Catherine Bertini
- Succeeded by: Alicia Bárcena Ibarra

Under Secretary of State for Management Acting
- In office February 4, 2005 – June 1, 2005
- President: George W. Bush
- Preceded by: Grant S. Green Jr.
- Succeeded by: Henrietta H. Fore

Assistant Secretary of State for Resource Management
- In office January 30, 2002 – February 4, 2005
- President: George W. Bush
- Preceded by: Position established
- Succeeded by: Bradford Higgins

Treasurer of Connecticut
- In office January 4, 1995 – July 22, 1997
- Governor: John G. Rowland
- Preceded by: Joseph M. Suggs Jr.
- Succeeded by: Paul J. Silvester

Member of the Connecticut House of Representatives from the 147th district
- In office November 11, 1987 – January 6, 1993
- Preceded by: Chris Shays
- Succeeded by: Michael Fedele

Personal details
- Born: Christopher Bancroft Burnham; 1956 (age 69–70)
- Party: Republican
- Education: Washington and Lee University (BA); Harvard University (MPA)

Christopher Bancroft Burnham (born 1956) is an American business executive, public servant, and politician. He is the chairman and chief executive officer of Cambridge Global Capital, LLC, and chairman of the board of EN+ Group. He has served as Under Secretary-General for Management of the United Nations, acting Under Secretary of State for Management, and Assistant Secretary of State for Resource Management and chief financial officer of the U.S. Department of State. He served three terms as a member of the Connecticut House of Representatives, and was then Connecticut State Treasurer, as well as vice chairman of Deutsche Bank Asset Management and global co-head of private equity.

== Early life and education ==
Born and raised in Stamford, Connecticut, Burnham's father, Alexander O. Burnham, was the managing editor of Dodd, Mead & Company and an author.

After attending the Kent School in Kent, Connecticut, Burnham worked on the staff of Senator Lowell Weicker from 1977 to 1978, and earned a B.A. degree from Washington and Lee University in Lexington, Virginia, in 1980, and a master's degree in public administration from Harvard Kennedy School. He also studied national security policy in Georgetown University's National Security Studies Program.

== Career ==
=== Military service, political, and private sector activities ===
Burnham joined the United States Marine Corps in April 1980, and was a veteran of the first Gulf War. He led one of the first infantry units to reach and liberate Kuwait City in 1991, and received honors including the Combat Action Ribbon. In January 1986, he was appointed to the Stamford Republican Town Committee, and later that year challenged longtime political operative Constantine Brandi for the chairmanship of that committee. From 1987 to 1992 he was a representative in the Connecticut General Assembly, being elected to the Connecticut House of Representatives three times, and serving as assistant minority leader.

Burnham was elected Connecticut State Treasurer in 1994, defeating the Democratic incumbent Joseph M. Suggs Jr. During his tenure, Burnham advocated structural changes to professionalize the office and reduce its dependence on electoral politics. He proposed creation of a six-member board of trustees drawn from the private sector to advise the treasurer on investment decisions involving the state employee pension fund, then valued at $14.5 billion. He also argued that the office should be appointive rather than elective, and that holders of the position should meet minimum professional qualifications in finance. Burnham reduced staff in the department, which was controversial, and said that he had improved the performance of an underperforming pension fund. Burnham resigned effective July 22, 1997, to become president and chief executive officer of Columbus Circle Investors, an investment firm based in Stamford, Connecticut. Because Burnham had previously hired the firm to manage $150 million of the state's pension funds, his decision to join the company came under criticism. In the private sector, Burnham also worked as an investment banker with Credit Suisse First Boston and Advest Corporate Finance.

Returning to public service in the first administration of President George W. Bush, Burnham served as acting Under Secretary of State for Management for Secretary Condoleezza Rice, and as Assistant Secretary of State for resource management and chief financial officer of the State Department for General Colin Powell. In 2005, he was awarded the United States Secretary of State's Award for Distinguished Service.

=== United Nations ===
Burnham joined the United Nations in May 2005, when Secretary-General Kofi Annan appointed Burnham as U.N. Under Secretary-General for Management. He established the first UN Ethics Office, the first United Nations Independent Audit Advisory Committee, the adoption of new International Public Sector Accounting Standards, the first comprehensive consolidated annual report in the history of the United Nations, and a new whistleblower protection policy that received independent recognition as the "gold standard".

During his time as under secretary general for management at the UN, Burnham uncovered extensive evidence of fraud involving the purchase of equipment for peacekeeping operations amounting to tens of millions of dollars. The investigation led to the suspension with pay of eight officials from the offices of peacekeeping and management.

=== Post-United Nations career ===
In 2016, Burnham served on the transition team of President Donald Trump at the U.S. State Department.

In 2020, Burnham was nominated by President Donald Trump to be the member of the Federal Retirement Thrift Investment Board (FRTIB).

In the 2020s, Burnham has served as the chairman and chief executive officer of Cambridge Global Capital, LLC, a venture capital investment firm, and the associated Cambridge Analytics, a geopolitical analysis firm. By 2022, he had also become chairman of the board of EN+ Group.

== Personal life ==
In 1993, Burnham married Courtney Anne Bauer of Delray Beach, Florida, then a regional advertising sales manager for Modern Healthcare magazine.

Burnham has been a resident of Stamford and Greenwich, Connecticut.

Party political offices
Preceded by Joan R. Kemler	Republican nominee for Connecticut State Treasurer; 1994	Succeeded by Paul J. Silvester
Connecticut House of Representatives
Preceded by Chris Shays	Member of the Connecticut House of Representatives from the 147th district 1987–1993	Succeeded by Michael Fedele
Political offices
Preceded by Joseph M. Suggs Jr.	Treasurer of Connecticut; 1995–1997	Succeeded by Paul J. Silvester
New office	Assistant Secretary of State for Resource Management; 2002–2005	Succeeded by Bradford Higgins
Preceded by Grant S. Green Jr.	Under Secretary of State for Management; Acting; 2005	Succeeded by Henrietta H. Fore
Diplomatic posts
Preceded by Catherine Bertini	Under Secretary General of the United Nations for Management; 2005–2006	Succeeded by Alicia Bárcena Ibarra
