= Joseph M. Suggs Jr. =

American politician

Connecticut State Treasurer
- In office March 3, 1993 – 1995
- Governor: Lowell Weicker
- Preceded by: Francisco L. Borges
- Succeeded by: Christopher Burnham

Mayor of Bloomfield, Connecticut
- In office 1989–1993

Personal details
- Born: August 1, 1940 (age 86) Hartford, Connecticut, US
- Party: Democratic Party
- Education: University of Hartford (BS)
- Occupation: Politician

Joseph M. Suggs Jr. (born August 1, 1940) is an American politician who served as Connecticut State Treasurer from 1993 to 1995.

== Biography ==
Suggs was appointed to the office of state treasurer by the Connecticut General Assembly to complete the term of Francisco L. Borges, who had resigned to accept a finance job in the private sector. Suggs lost the 1994 general election for treasurer to Republican state representative Christopher Burnham. A Democrat, Suggs had served as mayor of Bloomfield, Connecticut, from 1989 to 1993. He was the town's first African American mayor and the only Black mayor of a suburban Connecticut town at the time. In 1998, Suggs sought the Democratic nomination for Connecticut's 1st congressional district, losing the primary to John B. Larson. In 2018, he narrowly lost a special election for the Connecticut House of Representatives.

Suggs worked 27 years as a laboratory supervisor for Monsanto, retiring in 1993. He supported the development of PET plastic bottles now widely used in the beverage industry. Born in Hartford and raised in Coventry, he served in the US Air Force and earned a Bachelor of Science degree from the University of Hartford in 1978. He has served on the boards of the University of Hartford and Saint Francis Hospital and as co-chair of the Council of Institutional Investors. He was recognized twice by the NAACP as one of the 100 Most Influential Blacks of Connecticut. He is currently a business consultant.

== Personal life ==
Suggs is a widower (his wife Mary died in 1989) with three children: Ronald, Rosemary, and Felicia.

Party political offices
Preceded by Francisco L. Borges	Democratic nominee for Connecticut State Treasurer; 1994	Succeeded by Denise Nappier
Political offices
Preceded by Francisco L. Borges	Treasurer of Connecticut; 1993–1995	Succeeded by Christopher Burnham
