= Francisco L. Borges =

American politician

Connecticut State Treasurer
- In office January 4, 1987 – March 1, 1993
- Governor: William A. O'Neill; Lowell Weicker
- Preceded by: Joan R. Kemler
- Succeeded by: Joseph M. Suggs Jr.

Personal details
- Born: November 17, 1951 (age 74) Cape Verde
- Citizenship: American
- Party: Democratic Party
- Education: Trinity College (BA); University of Connecticut School of Law (JD)
- Occupation: Politician, business executive

Francisco Lopes Borges (born November 17, 1951) is an American business executive and former politician who served as Connecticut State Treasurer from 1987 to 1993, succeeding Joan R. Kemler. A member of the Democratic Party, Borges was Connecticut's third black state treasurer.

== Early life and education ==
Borges was born in Cape Verde to parents Manuel and Maria Lopes Borges. He grew up in New Haven, Connecticut, the oldest of five siblings. He spoke only Portuguese until he was eight years old. He attended Millbrook School on a scholarship, and he went on to receive his Bachelor of Arts degree from Trinity College in 1974 and a J.D. from the University of Connecticut School of Law in 1978. He was associate counsel at Travelers from 1978 to 1986.

== Political career ==
Borges was elected to the Hartford City Council in 1981 and served as deputy mayor from 1983 to 1985. He was elected Connecticut State Treasurer in 1986, defeating Republican opponent and Middletown mayor Sebastian J. Garafalo by 11 points. Borges won reelection in 1990 by a much narrower three-point margin, defeating former state treasurer Joan R. Kemler. Borges divested the state's pension portfolio from companies doing business in Northern Ireland and apartheid South Africa.

Effective March 1, 1993, Borges resigned from office to become an executive at the New York-based Financial Guaranty Insurance Company, a subsidiary of General Electric Capital. U.S. Senators Chris Dodd and Joe Lieberman had lobbied the Clinton Administration to appoint Borges to lead the Federal Deposit Insurance Corporation, but the administration moved slowly and Borges opted to accept the Wall Street job offer. The Connecticut General Assembly selected Bloomfield mayor Joseph M. Suggs Jr. to fill the remaining two years of Borges's term.

== Business career ==
Borges is chair and managing partner of Landmark Partners, an investment company based in Simsbury. Landmark was the subject of a 2000 civil complaint by the US Securities and Exchange Commission, charging that Landmark's leaders provided kickbacks to Republican state treasurer Paul J. Silvester in exchange for Silvester's 1998 award of major state pension-fund investment contracts to Landmark. The misdeeds took place before Borges joined the company. Borges disputed the charges. Silvester subsequently pled guilty to federal racketeering charges. Landmark agreed to settle the case and pay a $100,000 fine; its chair, Stanley J. Alfeld, paid an additional fine of $50,000. Neither Landmark nor Alfeld admitted wrongdoing as part of the settlement.

Party political offices
Preceded by Henry E. Parker	Democratic nominee for Connecticut State Treasurer; 1986, 1990	Succeeded by Joseph M. Suggs Jr.
Political offices
Preceded by Joan R. Kemler	State Treasurer of Connecticut; 1987–1993	Succeeded by Joseph M. Suggs Jr.
