= Connecticut's 95th House of Representatives district =

American legislative district

Connecticut's 95th State House of Representatives district
Representative
Juan Candelaria; D

Connecticut's 95th House of Representatives district elects one member of the Connecticut House of Representatives. It encompasses parts of New Haven and has been represented by Democrat Juan Candelaria since 2003.

== List of representatives ==
List of representatives from Connecticut's 95th State House district
Representative	Party	Years	District home	Note
Paul Pawlak Sr.	Democratic	1967–1969	Seymour	Seat created
Ronald A. Sarasin	Republican	1969–1973	Beacon Falls	
William P. Ambrogio	Democratic	1973–1977	New Haven	
Thomas F. Wall Jr.	Democratic	1977–1981	New Haven	
Walter S. Brooks	Democratic	1981–1991	New Haven	
Janette Parker	Democratic	1991–1993	New Haven	
Andrea Jackson-Brooks	Democratic	1993–1995	New Haven	
John S. Martinez	Democratic	1995–2003	New Haven	
Juan Candelaria	Democratic	2003–	New Haven	

== Recent elections ==
=== 2020 ===
2020 Connecticut State House of Representatives election, District 95
Party	Candidate	Votes	%
Democratic	Juan Candelaria (incumbent)	4,129	100.00
Democratic hold			

=== 2018 ===
2018 Connecticut House of Representatives election, District 95
Party	Candidate	Votes	%
Democratic	Juan Candelaria (Incumbent)	3,166	88.2
Republican	John Carlson	424	11.8
Total votes		3,590	100.00
Democratic hold			

=== 2016 ===
2016 Connecticut House of Representatives election, District 95
Party	Candidate	Votes	%
Democratic	Juan Candelaria (Incumbent)	5,044	100.00
Total votes		5,044	100.00
Democratic hold			

=== 2014 ===
2014 Connecticut House of Representatives election, District 95
Party	Candidate	Votes	%
Democratic	Juan Candelaria (Incumbent)	2,891	100.00
Total votes		2,891	100.00
Democratic hold			

=== 2012 ===
2012 Connecticut House of Representatives election, District 95
Party	Candidate	Votes	%
Democratic	Juan Candelaria (Incumbent)	5,133	100.00
Total votes		5,133	100.00
Democratic hold			
