= Janette Parker =

American politician

Member of the Connecticut House of Representatives from the 95th district
- In office 1991–1993
- Preceded by: Walter S. Brooks
- Succeeded by: Andrea Jackson-Brooks

Personal details
- Party: Democratic
- Spouse: Henry E. Parker (m. 1959; died 2018)

Janette J. Parker is an American politician who served in the Connecticut House of Representatives from 1991 to 1993, representing the 95th district as a Democrat. She married Henry E. Parker in 1959, and they lived in New Haven. Henry died in 2018.
