= Nuclear Implosions =

2008 book by Daniel Pope

Nuclear Implosions: The Rise and Fall of the Washington Public Power Supply System
- Author: Daniel Pope
- Language: English
- Genre: Non-fiction
- Publisher: Cambridge University Press
- Publication date: 2008
- Media type: Print
- Pages: 304
- ISBN: 978-0-521-40253-8 (hardcover); ISBN 978-0-511-38928-3 (e-book)
- OCLC: 172979863
- Dewey Decimal: 333.793/209797 22
- LC Class: HD9685.U7 W3456 2008

Nuclear Implosions: The Rise and Fall of the Washington Public Power Supply System is a 2008 book by Daniel Pope, a history professor at the University of Oregon, which traces the history of the Washington Public Power Supply System, a public agency which undertook to build five large nuclear power plants, one of the most ambitious U.S. construction projects in the 1970s.

By 1983, cost overruns and delays, along with a slowing of electricity demand growth, led to cancellation of two plants and a construction halt on two others. Moreover, the agency defaulted on $2.25 billion of municipal bonds, which is still the largest municipal bond default in U.S. history. The court case that followed took nearly a decade to resolve.

== See also ==
- Anti-nuclear movement in the United States
- List of books about nuclear issues
- Nuclear power in the United States
- Satsop, Washington
- Bond insurance
