= Ross Garber =

American lawyer, professor, and legal analyst

- Born: April 3, 1967 (age 57)
- Education: University of Connecticut; University of Connecticut School of Law (JD)
- Occupation(s): Lawyer; Legal analyst Legal professor
- Known for: Impeachment expert

Ross H. Garber (born April 3, 1967) is an American lawyer, professor, and legal analyst. The New York Times noted that he has "arguably become the nation's leading practitioner of a subspecialty whose relevance can be a barometer of political rancor." He has provided on-air commentary for CNN, MSNBC, NPR, and other outlets, and has written pieces for The Washington Post, CNN, The Los Angeles Times, and other publications. He teaches political investigations and impeachment at Tulane Law School and is considered a legal expert in those fields. He was a contributing author to the book Ethical Standards in the Public Sector.

== Early life and education ==
Garber grew up in Uncasville, Connecticut, and although Jewish, attended the Roman Catholic Saint Bernard School. He graduated from the University of Connecticut and went on to earn his Juris Doctor from University of Connecticut School of Law.

== Career ==
Garber is considered a legal expert on political investigations and impeachment. He has both prosecuted and defended impeachment cases, and has represented five United States governors in impeachment proceedings.

Garber was a partner at Shipman & Goodwin where he chaired the firm's government investigations and white collar defense group.

Garber argued before the U.S. Court of Appeals for the Second Circuit that public officials and government lawyers have an attorney-client privilege in grand jury investigations. In 2005, the court agreed, rejecting contrary holdings of the U.S. Courts of Appeals for the Seventh Circuit, Eighth Circuit, and District of Columbia Circuit.

Garber has worked as an on-air legal analyst for CNN, and has provided on-air commentary for MSNBC and NPR. He teaches political investigations and impeachment law at Tulane Law School. He has written for The Los Angeles Times and The Washington Post as well as appeared on The Beat with Ari Melber. He is also a contributing author for Ethical Standards in the Public Sector.

Party political offices
Preceded by Paul J. Silvester	Republican nominee for Connecticut State Treasurer; 2002	Succeeded by Linda Roberts
