= 1990 Connecticut State Treasurer election =

- November 6, 1990

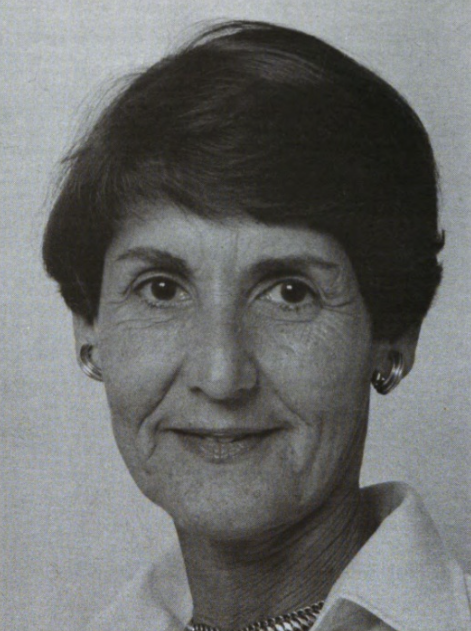
Nominee	Francisco L. Borges	Joan R. Kemler
Party	Democratic	Republican
Popular vote	483,569	452,858
Percentage	50.8%	47.6%
- Borges: 40–50% 50–60% 60–70% 70–80% Kemler: 40–50% 50–60% 60–70% 70–80% 80–90%
State Treasurer before election
Francisco L. Borges
Democratic
Elected State Treasurer
Francisco L. Borges
Democratic

The 1990 Connecticut State Treasurer election took place on November 6, 1990, to elect the Connecticut State Treasurer. Incumbent Democratic State Treasurer Francisco L. Borges won re-election to a second term, defeating Republican nominee Joan R. Kemler.

Kemler, who served as state treasurer for a year after being appointed by Governor William A. O'Neill in February 1986, switched parties from Democrat to Republican to run for state treasurer in 1990.

== Democratic primary ==
=== Candidates ===
==== Nominee ====
- Francisco L. Borges, incumbent state treasurer (1987–1993)

== Republican primary ==
=== Candidates ===
==== Nominee ====
- Joan R. Kemler, former Democratic state treasurer (1986–1987)

== Third-party candidates and independent candidates ==
=== Concerned Citizens Party ===
Nominee

- William A. Iles

== General election ==
=== Results ===
1990 Connecticut State Treasurer election
Party	Candidate	Votes	%	±%
Democratic	Francisco L. Borges	483,569	50.82%	
Republican	Joan R. Kemler	452,858	47.60%	
Concerned Citizens	William A. Iles	15,053	1.58%	
Total votes		951,480	100.0%	
Democratic hold				
