= Saint Bernard School =

School in Uncasville, Connecticut, United States

- Schola Sancti Bernardi
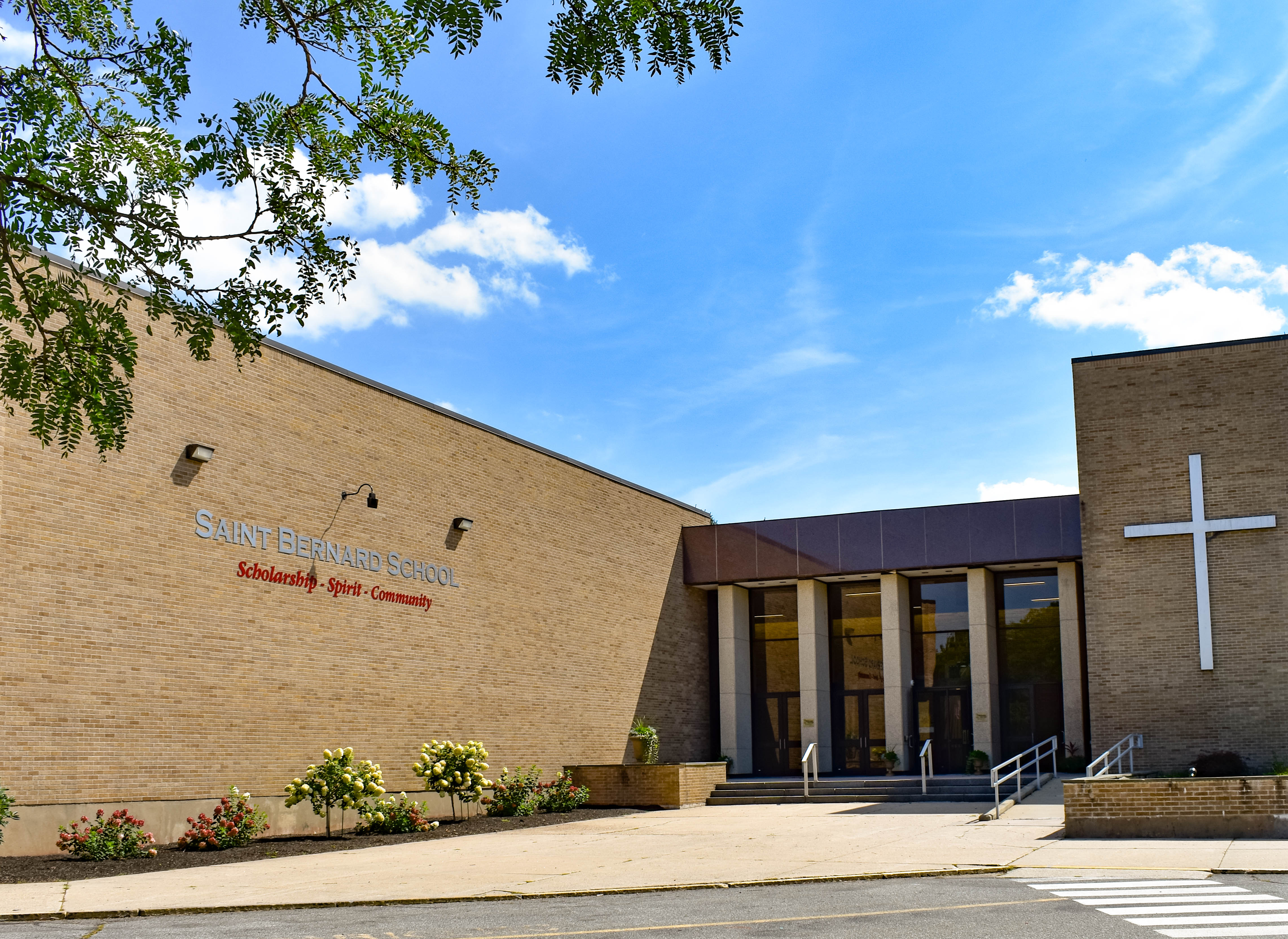

Location
- 1593 Norwich-New London Turnpike; Uncasville, New London County, Connecticut 06382; United States
- Coordinates: 41°28′8″N 72°5′58″W

Information
- Type: Private, Coeducational
- Religious affiliations: Roman Catholic, Xaverian
- Patron saints: Saint Bernard of Clairvaux; Saint Francis Xavier
- Established: 1956 (70 years ago)
- CEEB code: 070428
- Campus Director: Susan Haulotte (minister)
- Head of school: Donald Macrino
- Grades: 6–12
- Campus size: 113 acres (0.46 km^{2})
- Colors: Red and grey
- Song: When the Saints go marching in
- Athletics: Cheerleading, men's and women's cross country, football (Norwich Tech), men's and women's soccer, men's and women's basketball, fencing (co-ed), wrestling, baseball, golf, men's and women's lacrosse, softball, men's and women's tennis, track and field, coed varsity ice hockey
- Athletics conference: Eastern Connecticut Conference
- Mascot: St. Bernard (dog)
- Team name: Saints
- Rival: Montville/Norwich Free Academy
- Accreditation: New England Association of Schools and Colleges
- Newspaper: The Shield
- Yearbook: The Phoenix
- Tuition: $13,500
- School emblem: Fleur-de-lis
- Website: www.saintbernardschool.org

Saint Bernard School is a private, Roman Catholic high school in Uncasville, Connecticut. It is located in the Roman Catholic Diocese of Norwich and is co-sponsored by the Xaverian Brothers.

== The early years ==
Saint Bernard was established in 1956 as an all-girls school in New London, Connecticut. The school became coeducational in 1958. In 1967, the New London Campus reverted to an all-girls school, while a new boys' school opened in Uncasville. In addition, another all-girls school named Notre Dame opened in Norwich, Connecticut. This three-school model only lasted five years due to high operating costs and in 1972, the Norwich diocese closed Notre Dame and St. Bernard Girls' School, merging them with the Boys' school in Uncasville.

The former Notre Dame campus has since served as Three Rivers Community College Mohegan Campus and in the fall of 2008 became Norwich Regional Technical High School.

== Notable alumni ==
- Brook Fordyce, Class of 1989
- Ross Garber, Class of 1985
- Harold Pressley, Class of 1982
- Joseph Stallcop, Class of 2014
