= Project No One Leaves =

American non-profit organization

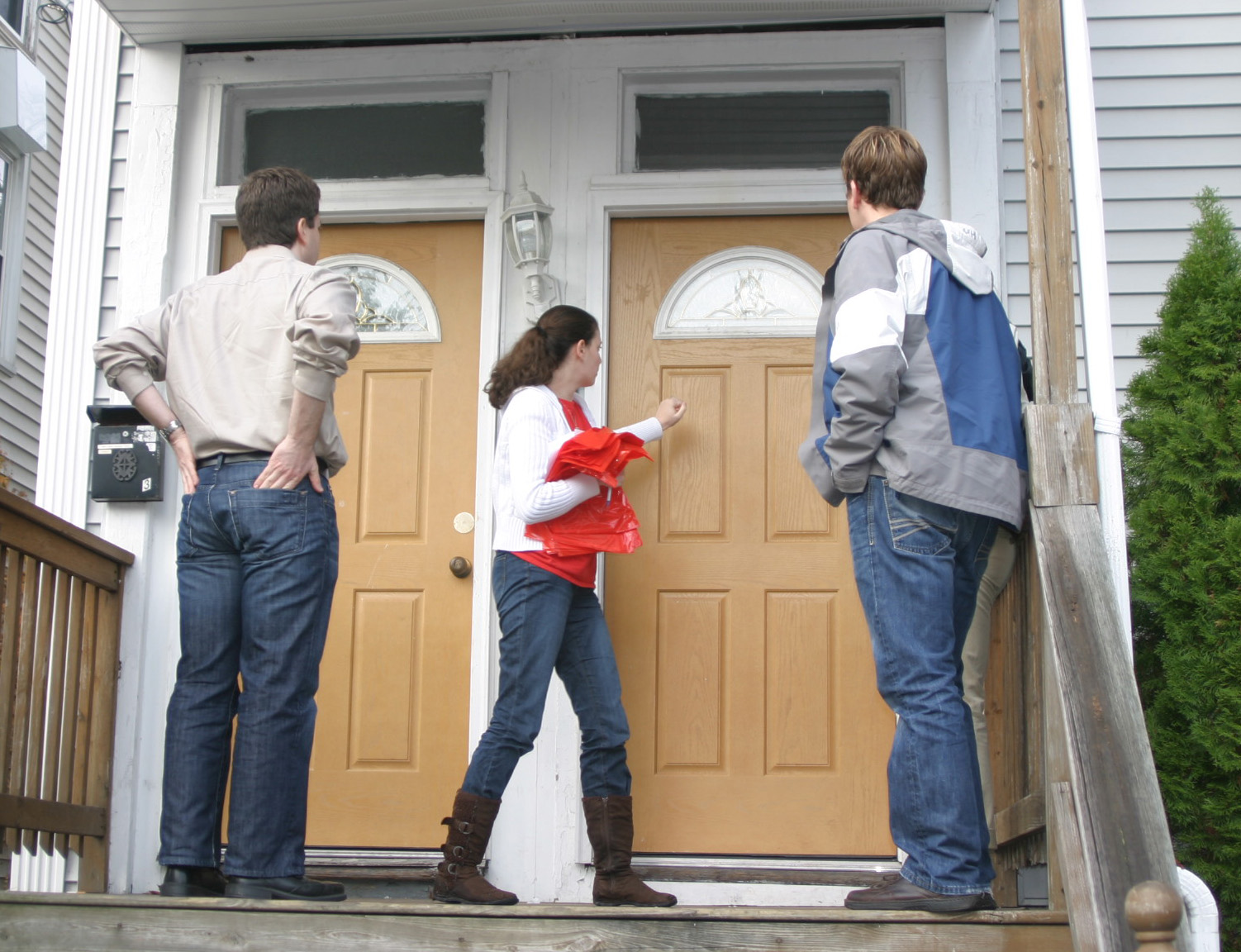
Project No One Leaves volunteers canvassing an affected property

Project No One Leaves (PNOL) is a Boston non-profit tenants' rights organization which provides legal education to people living in foreclosed homes to enable them to understand and protect their legal rights. The group was established in 2008 by members of the Harvard Legal Aid Bureau who specialized in housing law in response to a perceived spike in foreclosures and mass evictions in low-income Boston neighborhoods.

== Organizational history ==
=== Establishment ===
Project No One Leaves (PNOL) began in January 2008 with the establishment of a Foreclosure Task Force of the Harvard Legal Aid Bureau by Harvard Law School students Nick Hartigan and David Haller.

In September of that same year Project No One Leaves was formally launched, with Hartigan and Haller being joined by Tony Borich, another Harvard student affiliated with the Harvard Legal Aid Bureau, the oldest student-run legal aid organization in the United States. The trio were concerned about an uptick in foreclosures and evictions meted out against low-income Bostonians due to the subprime mortgage crisis and set out to inform the occupants of foreclosed homes of their legal rights under the state laws of Massachusetts.

Project No One Leaves makes use of newly filed foreclosures in the area to create a database of affected residences. Residents are then contacted in person by volunteers with the project, which include students at Harvard Law School and eight other Boston-area law schools and colleges, as well as undergraduates and members of concerned community groups. In 2009, more than 1,000 people living in foreclosed properties were contacted by Project No One Leaves and informed of their legal rights, with a view to helping keep victims of foreclosure in their own homes.

Canvassers encourage residents to attend meetings of City Life/Vida Urbana to meet others in similar straits and help interested individuals to make contact with Harvard Legal Aid's Foreclosure Task Force and other legal aid organizations. This grassroots contact enables legal action to be taken against those mortgage-holders who are in violation of the law. Law students have won a series of cash settlements by those banks which have failed to keep the properties they hold in satisfactory condition for habitation.

Working together, Project No One Leaves volunteers, City Life community organizers, and other groups work to pressure banks holding foreclosed properties to resell the assets to community lender Boston Community Capital (BCC), which mortgages or sometimes rents them to the original occupants at the current deflated market rate. BCC makes its money by charging a 25 percent premium on its purchase price. Residents are thus allowed to stay in their current dwelling on a more affordable fixed-rate mortgage, while banks are able to expeditiously turn over their foreclosed properties for somewhat more than they would typically expect.

In the 13 months between May 2010 and June 2011, BCC purchased a total of 55 properties containing a total of 125 residential units. Plans are in place for the future purchase and resale of hundreds of more homes, primarily in working class areas of Boston.

=== Growth ===
Over its first three years of its existence, Project No One Leaves has grown, with additional chapters sprouting in Boston and elsewhere in the United States, including Miami.

In November 2010, Project No One Leaves organized a national conference in which lawyers and community organizers from 15 states came to Boston to learn about the foreclosure resistance model espoused by the organization.

=== National recognition ===
The joint activities of Project No One Leaves and City Life have attracted national attention via the PBS News Hour, the New York Times, National Public Radio, and the Huffington Post.

Project No One Leaves has also received recognition from national housing organizations, such as the National Law Center on Homelessness and Poverty.

In April 2009 Project No One Leaves founders Dave Haller and Nick Hartigan received the Outstanding Student Award from the Clinical Legal Education Association in recognition of their excellence in clinical legal work.

Project No One Leaves and Boston Community Capital saw their national stature further elevated in April 2010 when chairman of the Federal Reserve Ben Bernanke cited their efforts as an example of how "local communities are meeting the challenges of tough times" in a public speech.
