= Andrea Jackson-Brooks =

American politician (1943–2023)

Member of the Connecticut House of Representatives from the 95th district
- In office 1993–1995
- Preceded by: Janette Parker
- Succeeded by: John S. Martinez

Personal details
- Born: 1943 Newport, Rhode Island, U.S.
- Died: October 15, 2023 (aged 79–80)
- Party: Democratic
- Children: 2

Andrea Jackson-Brooks (1943 – October 15, 2023) was an American politician who served in the Connecticut House of Representatives from 1993 to 1995, representing the 95th district as a Democrat. She was born in Newport, Rhode Island, and later moved to New Haven, Connecticut. Jackson-Brooks was a presidential elector from Connecticut in the 2008 election. She was pledged to Barack Obama and Joe Biden.
