= 2002 Connecticut State Treasurer election =

- November 5, 2002

Nominee	Denise L. Nappier	Ross Garber
Party	Democratic	Republican
Popular vote	527,216	389,304
Percentage	56.0%	41.3%
- Nappier: 40–50% 50–60% 60–70% 70–80% 80–90% Garber: 40–50% 50–60% 60–70%
State Treasurer before election
Denise L. Nappier
Democratic
Elected State Treasurer
Denise L. Nappier
Democratic

The 2002 Connecticut State Treasurer election took place on November 5, 2002, to elect the Connecticut State Treasurer. Incumbent Democratic State Treasurer Denise L. Nappier won re-election to a second term, defeating Republican nominee Ross Garber.

== Democratic primary ==
=== Candidates ===
==== Nominee ====
- Denise L. Nappier, incumbent state treasurer (1999–2019)

== Republican primary ==
=== Candidates ===
==== Nominee ====
- Ross Garber, lawyer and candidate for state senator from the 4th district in 2000

== Third-party candidates and independent candidates ==
=== Concerned Citizens Party ===
Nominee

- Timothey A. Knibbs, candidate for state senator from the 6th district in 1996, 1998, and 2000

=== Libertarian Party ===
Nominee

- Ken Mosher, nominee for secretary of the state in 1998

== General election ==
=== Results ===
2002 Connecticut State Treasurer election
Party	Candidate	Votes	%	±%
Democratic	Denise L. Nappier (incumbent)	527,216	55.95%	
Republican	Ross Garber	389,304	41.31%	
Concerned Citizens	Timothey A. Knibbs	13,394	1.42%	
Libertarian	Ken Mosher	12,449	1.32%	
Total votes		942,363	100.0%	
Democratic hold				

=== By congressional district ===
Nappier won all five congressional districts, including three that elected Republicans.

District	Nappier	Garber	Representative
1st	62%	36%	John Larson
2nd	56%	40%	Rob Simmons
3rd	60%	37%	Rosa DeLauro
4th	48.8%	48.6%	Chris Shays
5th	52%	45%	Nancy Johnson
