= City Life/Vida Urbana =

Activist group in Massachusetts, US

City Life/Vida Urbana (CL/VU, clvu.org) (est. 1973) commonly known as "City Life," is a social justice group in Boston, Massachusetts. Founded in 1973, a group of local residents and activists with roots in the civil rights, feminist and anti-Vietnam War movements founded the Jamaica Plain Tenants Action Group, now City Life/Vida Urbana. Since 2008, City Life has focused on preventing evictions of both former owners and renters resulting from a rise in foreclosures. City Life/Vida Urbana is currently based in Jamaica Plain, with satellite memberships in East Boston, Brockton, Lynn, Quincy, and Worcester.

== Organizational history ==
Early organizing focused on stopping housing divestment and neglect. Growing numbers of city slumlords had stopped maintaining their buildings – while still raising the rent on units that were unsafe and unsanitary. Others were burning down their own buildings for profit. Tenant organizers identified the worst buildings and organized occupants to take power. Soon thousands of tenants across the city were holding rent strikes, taking owners to court and even picketing in front of their suburban mansions. In response to this powerful movement, the city passed rent control protections, helping tenants for the next 20 years. Several noted property owners were convicted for arson.

When the housing market turned around in the 1980s, gentrification, speculation and condominium conversions became the new threat. CL/VU created an Eviction Free Zone in Jamaica Plain, helping hundreds of people to stay in their homes and inspiring similar models in Roxbury, East Boston, Cambridge and cities in other parts of the country.

The loss of rent control in 1994 sparked a dramatic increase in housing prices. CL/VU responded by applying pressure on local property owners to maintain reasonable rents. They also began collaborating with the Jamaica Plain Neighborhood Development Corporation (JPNDC) to develop affordable housing. In 1990, the former Bowditch School opened as a 45-unit rooming housing for previously homeless people. JPNDC remains a strong voice for housing justice in Jamaica Plain, having created over 440 additional units since that time.

As the need grew, CL/VU began expanding its efforts across the city in the fight against displacement and for restoration of rent regulation. In just 3 years, tenants’ associations were formed in over 40 buildings. Working with CL/VU, these groups used a collective bargaining model to win affordability contracts, Section 8 rent subsidies, and limit rent increases. Two buildings totaling 435 units were able to win 99-year affordability contracts.

In 2007 CL/VU started noticing the increasing number of foreclosure evictions in housing court, prompting them to launch the Post Foreclosure Eviction Defense Campaign. Since 2008, eviction defense has been the thrust of CL/VU's organizing strategy to halt housing displacement for working class tenants and owners. Foreclosure evictions have disproportionately affected communities of color, and reasserted CL/VU's mission to work toward racial justice as well as confronting bank power with collective people power.

== Current Work ==
City Life has worked closely with Project No One Leaves, the Harvard Legal Aid Bureau, and other groups in efforts to pressure banks holding foreclosed properties to resell the assets to community lenders, including Boston Community Capital, which mortgages or rents them to the original occupants at the current deflated market rate.

City Life is not a law firm and does not legally represent former tenants and owners.

City Life employs what it calls a "sword and shield" strategy, including acts of direct action such as sit-ins, protest marches, and blockades as well as the defensive use of the court system by its legal advocates. The City Life strategy is to expand pressure on foreclosing financial institutions adding group action with individualized casework.

Between 2007 and the middle of 2011, City Life helped organize more than 20 blockades to prevent evictions, most of which accomplished their object. The organization has also been instrumental in pushing Boston Community Capital to become more actively involved in the financing of distressed properties.

The group meets weekly, ending its sessions with organizers leading a chant: "What do we do when the banks attack?" to which the audience responds, "Stand up, fight back!"
