= Bureau of Diplomatic Technology =

Component of the U.S. Department of State

- Seal of the U.S. Department of State

Bureau overview
- Jurisdiction: Executive Branch of the United States
- Headquarters: Harry S. Truman Building, Washington, D.C., United States
- Bureau executive: Dr. Kelly E. Fletcher, Chief Information Officer; Principal Deputy Chief Information Officer
- Parent department: U.S. Department of State
- Website: Official website

The Bureau of Diplomatic Technology (DT), formerly the Bureau of Information Resource Management (IRM), is a component of the U.S. Department of State responsible for providing modern, secure, and resilient information technology and services.

DT provides a range of information technology (IT) services in support of the Department's foreign policy objectives and diplomatic mission. DT is responsible for the comprehensive planning and oversight of Department-wide IT programs, as well as ensuring the security, integrity, and availability of Department networks and information systems. DT supports more than 100,000 domestic and overseas customers at 275 posts in 191 countries, providing the infrastructure for over 50 federal agencies and non-governmental partners that operate under Chief of Mission (COM) authority. DT services include provisioning secure and reliable global networks across three classification levels, with support to over 50,000 mobile devices; support to over 147,000 collaborative meetings per month; and 24/7 customer support, along with other core business offerings.

The bureau is headed by the Department of State's Chief Information Officer (CIO) who hold ranks equivalent to an Assistant Secretary of State. The CIO reports to the Under Secretary of State for Management (M), but reports to the Secretary of State when carrying out CIO functions established by the Clinger-Cohen Act. On October 6, 2023, Dr. Kelly E. Fletcher was appointed the CIO.

== Directorates ==
Directorates within the Bureau of Diplomatic Technology (DT) include:

- Business Management and Planning (DT/BMP) - is responsible for centrally managing a $2.55 billion global IT portfolio and serving a 76,000 person workforce. This includes providing executive leadership for IT strategy, portfolio management, enterprise architecture, digital diplomacy, policy and performance, and IT workforce planning.
- Cyber Operations (DT/CO) - is responsible for the implementation of the Federal Information Security Management Act (FISMA), and for establishing and implementing the enterprise vision, strategy, and programs that ensure information assets and technologies are adequately protected.
- Enterprise Infrastructure (DT/EI) - is DT’s field focused directorate providing IT infrastructure, core IT modernization, telephone systems and radio networks, emergency and mobile satellite systems, and other programs and services for over 300 sites around the world, including embassies, consulates, annexes, and missions to international organizations.
- Enterprise Services (DT/ES) - is responsible for the worldwide information technology operations including networks, e-mail, desktop support, mobile technologies, software development, equipment modernization, data center operations, telephones, and radios.
