= Denise Nappier =

American politician

82nd Treasurer of Connecticut
- In office January 3, 1999 – January 9, 2019
- Governor: John Rowland; Jodi Rell; Dan Malloy
- Preceded by: Paul J. Silvester
- Succeeded by: Shawn Wooden

Personal details
- Born: Denise Lynn Nappier; June 16, 1951 (age 75) Hartford, Connecticut, U.S.
- Party: Democratic
- Education: Virginia State University (BA); University of Cincinnati (MA)

Denise Lynn Nappier (born June 16, 1951) is an American who served as Connecticut State Treasurer, from 1999 to 2019. A member of the Democratic Party, she was first elected in 1998 and was re-elected in 2002, 2006, 2010 and 2014. She is the first African-American woman elected to statewide office in the history of Connecticut, the first woman elected State Treasurer in Connecticut history, and the first African-American woman elected to serve as state treasurer in the United States. In 2011, she was named to the Connecticut Women's Hall of Fame.

In January 2018, Nappier announced she would not seek re-election to a sixth term in November 2018.

== Early life and education ==
Born to parents Connie and Barbara Nappier in Hartford, Connecticut, she and her two sisters; Diane and Donna, were the first set of triplets born at the Mount Sinai Hospital. Nappier and her sisters excelled in gymnastics, track, golf, and cheerleading; she organized "Culottes Day" at her high school in the 1960s to protest the school's dress code banning the then-popular skirt-pant combination. Nappier graduated from Hartford Public High School in 1969.

Nappier graduated from Virginia State University, receiving her B.A. in 1973. She also graduated from University of Cincinnati, receiving her M.A. in City Planning in 1975. Nappier holds honorary degrees from Teikyo Post University, Trinity College, Briarwood College, University of Hartford and Saint Joseph College.

== Early career ==
After graduating, Nappier returned to Hartford, working as an analyst in the city manager's office, and as a consultant for the Connecticut Office of Policy and Management.

From 1981 to 1984, she was hired by the University of Connecticut, working as the Director of Institutional Relations for the University of Connecticut Health Center. During that time, Nappier also served as the chair of the Hartford Redevelopment Authority. In 1984 she was named the executive director of the Hartford Riverfront Recapture, where she was in charge of renovating riverfront's surrounding transportation infrastructure, connecting Hartford and East Hartford with a pedestrian walkway, and expanding the park system for both cities riverbanks.

In 1989, Nappier was elected to the first of five terms as Hartford City Treasurer, a position she held until 1998.

== State Treasurer of Connecticut ==
=== Elections ===
In December 1997, Nappier announced she would run for the Democratic nomination for State Treasurer of Connecticut, she defeated Frank A. Lecce, founder of a municipal-bond firm, at the state's Democratic convention with just 51% of the delegates cast. Frustrated with his defeat, Lecce challenged Nappier for the nomination in a further primary challenge; where Nappier won with 59% of the vote. In the general election, Napier faced Republican incumbent Paul J. Silvester, Libertarian Louis A. Garofalo and Concerned Citizens Party candidate Joseph J. Ciccomascolo. On November 3, 1998, the race was too close to call and it wasn't until November 6 when the results were announced; with Napier defeating Silvester by only 2,600 votes, it was one of the closest races for State Treasurer in Connecticut state history. Nappier was the first African-American to be elected to statewide office in Connecticut.

She ran for reelection in 2002, against Hartford attorney Ross Garber. She defeated Garber in the general election with 55%, winning the majority of the vote in every county in Connecticut.

In 2006, Nappier defeated East Windsor First Selectman Linda Roberts with 63% of the vote, the highest percentage of the vote she's received while running as State Treasurer.

In 2010, after Newington Mayor Jeff Wright suspended his campaign for Governor of Connecticut, he decided to run for State Treasurer. Nappier defeated Wright in the general election, with 54% of the vote.

=== Tenure ===
As Connecticut's chief elected financial officer, Nappier oversees $64 billion in state funds, including the state's retirement plans and trust funds.

After the 2001 Enron scandal, Nappier sought to recover the $15 million lost from Connecticut's pension fund, as a result of the company's hiding of billions of dollars in debt from failed deals and projects. Since the bankruptcy of Enron, Nappier has been an advocate for tighter regulation of financial institutions, and for separation between auditing and consulting firms.

In 2004, Nappier and then Connecticut Attorney General Richard Blumenthal filed suit against the private equity firm Forstmann Little & Company for the $120 million lost in Forstmann Little's failed investments in XO Communications Inc. and McLeodUSA Inc., two telecommunications firms that ended up filing for bankruptcy. Nappier and Bluementhal argued that the firm breached contractual obligations and fiduciary responsibilities, and violated securities law. Opponents of the suit argued that it could make funds less eager to work with states, while the financial industry feared that if Forstmann Little were found guilty, a stream of new suits would follow. On July 24, a six-person jury in Rockville, Connecticut, found that the firm breached its contract, but did not award financial compensations because they found that the state of Connecticut consented to the deal, and that the firm relied on information from its lawyers.

In April 2009, Nappier called on Bank of America CEO Ken Lewis to resign. She also called on other senior officials to resign including Bank of America's lead director, Temple Sloan, and Thomas Ryan, chairman of the bank's governance committee, due to the bank's acquisition of Merrill Lynch and $20 billion in losses in the fourth quarter of 2008. As Treasurer, Nappier represented the Connecticut pension fund system and the Connecticut's Department of Treasury on Bank of America's board of shareholders, due to the state's owning of 3.2 million shares ($34.7 million in market value) of the bank. At the annual shareholders meeting in Charlotte, North Carolina, Nappier voted against keeping the established leadership, saying that "In the interest of Bank of America's future growth and success, it's time to clean house and set the financial health of the company on a sustainable path." She also called on the board members of American International Group to resign, citing executive bonuses after the insurance firm received $182 billion from the federal government Troubled Asset Relief Program.

Nappier is a member of the boards of both the National Association of Corporate Directors and the International Foundation for Electoral Systems. Nappier also served as the treasurer for the National Association of State Treasurers, and as a fellow for the United States Department of Housing and Urban Development.

== Electoral history ==
Connecticut State Treasurer Democratic Primary Election, 1998
| Party | Candidate | Votes | % |
| Democratic | Denise Nappier | 58,315 | 59.25 |
| Democratic | Frank Lecce | 40,114 | 40.75 |

Connecticut State Treasurer Election, 1998
| Party | Candidate | Votes | % |
| Democratic | Denise Nappier | 436,573 | 49.00 |
| Republican | Paul Silvester | 433,889 | 48.70 |
| Libertarian | Louis Garofalo | 11,375 | 1.28 |
| Concerned Citizens | Joseph Ciccomascolo | 9,051 | 1.02 |

Connecticut State Treasurer Election, 2002
| Party | Candidate | Votes | % |
| Democratic | Denise Nappier (inc.) | 527,216 | 55.95 |
| Republican | Ross Garber | 389,304 | 41.31 |
| Concerned Citizens | Timothy Knibbs | 13,394 | 1.42 |
| Libertarian | Ken Mosher | 12,449 | 1.32 |

Connecticut State Treasurer Election, 2006
| Party | Candidate | Votes | % |
| Democratic | Denise Nappier (inc.) | 653,690 | 64.44 |
| Republican | Linda Roberts | 323,454 | 31.88 |
| Libertarian | Steven Edelman | 15,354 | 1.51 |
| Green | David Bue | 13,487 | 1.33 |
| Concerned Citizens | Mimi Knibbs | 8,482 | 0.84 |

Connecticut State Treasurer Election, 2010
| Party | Candidate | Votes | % |
| Democratic* | Denise Nappier (inc.) | 600,270 | 54.27 |
| Republican | Jeff Wright | 480,623 | 43.45 |
| Independent | Andrew Grant White | 15,611 | 1.41 |
| Green | David Bue | 9,600 | 0.87 |

*Nappier was also listed on the Working Families Party line.

Connecticut State Treasurer Election, 2014
| Party | Candidate | Votes | % |
| Democratic* | Denise Nappier (inc.) | 533,182 | 50.89 |
| Republican* | Timothy Herbst | 514,402 | 49.10 |
| Write-in | Rolf Maurer | 119 | 0.01 |

*Nappier was also listed on the Working Families Party line; Herbst was also listed on the Independent Party line.

== Notes ==
Party political offices
| Preceded by Joseph M. Suggs Jr. | Democratic nominee for Connecticut State Treasurer; 1998, 2002, 2006, 2010, 2014 | Succeeded by Shawn Wooden |
Political offices
| Preceded by Paul J. Silvester | Treasurer of Connecticut; 1999–2019 | Succeeded by Shawn Wooden |
