= 2006 Connecticut State Treasurer election =

- November 7, 2006

Nominee	Denise L. Nappier	Linda Roberts
Party	Democratic	Republican
Popular vote	653,690	323,454
Percentage	64.4%	31.9%
- Nappier: 40–50% 50–60% 60–70% 70–80% 80–90% Roberts: 40–50% 50–60% 60–70%
State Treasurer before election
Denise L. Nappier
Democratic
Elected State Treasurer
Denise L. Nappier
Democratic

The 2006 Connecticut State Treasurer election took place on November 7, 2006, to elect the Connecticut State Treasurer. Incumbent Democratic State Treasurer Denise L. Nappier won re-election to a third term, defeating Republican nominee Linda Roberts.

== Democratic primary ==
=== Candidates ===
==== Nominee ====
- Denise L. Nappier, incumbent state treasurer (1999–2019)

== Republican primary ==
=== Candidates ===
==== Nominee ====
- Linda Roberts, first selectman of East Windsor

== Third-party candidates and independent candidates ==
=== Libertarian Party ===
Nominee

- Steven Edelman

=== Green Party ===
Nominee

- S. David Bue, fiduciary investment advisor from Westport

=== Concerned Citizens Party ===
Nominee

- Mimi M. Knibbs

== General election ==
=== Results ===
2006 Connecticut State Treasurer election
Party	Candidate	Votes	%	±%
Democratic	Denise L. Nappier (incumbent)	653,690	64.44%	
Republican	Linda Roberts	323,454	31.88%	
Libertarian	Steven Edelman	15,354	1.51%	
Green	S. David Bue	13,487	1.33%	
Concerned Citizens	Mimi M. Knibbs	8,482	0.84%	
Total votes		1,014,467	100.0%	
Democratic hold				

==== By congressional district ====
Nappier won all five congressional districts, including one that elected a Republican.

District	Nappier	Roberts	Representative
1st	72%	25%	John B. Larson
2nd	65%	31%	Rob Simmons (109th Congress)
2nd	65%	31%	Joe Courtney (110th Congress)
3rd	67%	29%	Rosa DeLauro
4th	55%	41%	Christopher Shays
5th	62%	34%	Nancy L. Johnson (109th Congress)
5th	62%	34%	Chris Murphy (110th Congress)
