= Joan R. Kemler =

American politician (1926–2020)

Joan Rosen Kemler
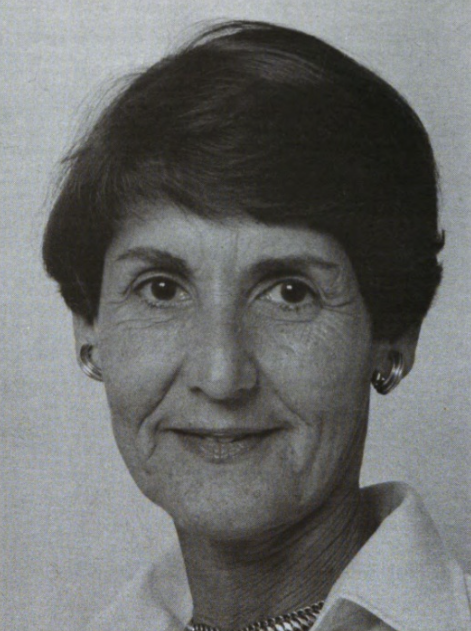

77th Treasurer of Connecticut
- In office February 3, 1986 – January 4, 1987
- Governor: William A. O'Neill
- Preceded by: Henry E. Parker
- Succeeded by: Francisco L. Borges

Member of the Connecticut House of Representatives from the 18th district
- In office 1975–1985
- Preceded by: David H. Neiditz
- Succeeded by: Miles S. Rapoport

Personal details
- Born: Joan Rosen; March 28, 1926 New Haven, Connecticut, US
- Died: August 9, 2020 (aged 94) Delray Beach, Florida, US
- Party: Democratic Party
- Education: Connecticut College (BA); Trinity College (MA)
- Occupation: Politician

Joan Rosen Kemler (March 28, 1926 – August 9, 2020) was an American politician who served as Connecticut State Treasurer from 1986 to 1987. Governor William A. O'Neill appointed her to the office after Henry E. Parker resigned to work for an investment firm. Kemler was the first woman to serve as state treasurer in Connecticut. She switched parties from Democratic to Republican to run for treasurer in 1990 but lost the election to Francisco L. Borges.

== Early life and education ==
Kemler was born in New Haven, Connecticut, to parents James M. and Nellie (Cohen) Rosen. She received her diploma from Hillhouse High School in 1943 and went on to earn a Bachelor of Arts degree in economics from Connecticut College in 1947 and a Master of Arts in government from Trinity College in 1972. She volunteered for the League of Women Voters from 1952 to 1968. Governor Ella Grasso appointed her to serve on the State Revenue Task Force (1969–1971). She resided in West Hartford from 1957 and represented parts of the town in the Connecticut General Assembly.

== Political career ==
Kemler represented Connecticut's 18th House of Representatives district from 1975 to 1985, serving as assistant majority leader from 1979 to 1984. A conservative Democrat, she advocated for mandatory jobs for welfare recipients and opposed a state income tax. She served on the House's finance, revenue and bonding, and appropriations committees. In 1984, she lost the Democratic primary to progressive challenger and future Connecticut Secretary of State Miles S. Rapoport, who went on to win the general election in the heavily Democratic district of West Hartford.

Effective February 3, 1986, Governor O'Neill appointed Kemler to the office of Connecticut State Treasurer to fill the remaining 11 months of Henry E. Parker's term after he resigned to work for an investment firm. As a condition of her appointment, Kemler agreed not to run in the election to succeed Parker. She largely maintained Parker's policies during her time in office.

In 1990, at the urging of gubernatorial candidate John G. Rowland, Kemler changed her registration to the Republican Party to challenge Democratic incumbent State Treasurer Francisco L. Borges, whom she accused of mismanagement and corruption. After a heated campaign, Borges defeated Kemler at the polls to win reelection. Kemler then exited politics.

Kemler also spent several years on the Board of the Governors of Higher Education.

== Personal life ==
Kemler was married to R. Leonard Kemler (1918–2001), a physician in private practice, a clinical professor at the University of Connecticut Health Center, and a prominent civic leader in his own right. They had two children: David S. Kemler and Louise Kemler Kaufman. At the time of his death, the couple had been married for nearly 50 years.

In 1984, a local Jewish teenager was convicted of arson after setting fires at two West Hartford synagogues, a local rabbi's home, and Kemler's home. Kemler was Jewish, and she and her husband were active congregants at West Hartford's Emanuel Synagogue for many years.

Kemler died in Delray Beach, Florida, on August 9, 2020, at the age of 94.

Party political offices
Preceded by Sebastian Garafalo	Republican nominee for Connecticut State Treasurer; 1990	Succeeded by Christopher Burnham
Political offices
Preceded by Henry E. Parker	Treasurer of Connecticut; 1986–1987	Succeeded by Francisco L. Borges
