= Paul J. Silvester =

81st Treasurer of Connecticut
- In office 1997–1999
- Governor: John Rowland
- Preceded by: Christopher Burnham
- Succeeded by: Denise Nappier

Personal details
- Born: Paul J. Silvester; 1963 (age 62–63) Hartford, Connecticut, US
- Party: Republican
- Occupation: Politician, businessman

Paul J. Silvester (born 1963) is an American white collar criminal who served as Connecticut State Treasurer from 1997 to 1999. Convicted of racketeering and conspiracy to launder money, he served four years and three months in prison.

== Personal life and education ==
Paul Silvester is the son of George and Eva Silvester of Hartford, Connecticut. Silvester was married to West Hartford lawyer Christine A. Olson. The couple divorced in 2002 while he was on trial. They have two children together.

== Public service career ==
In July 1997, Silvester was appointed to the office of Connecticut State Treasurer by Governor John G. Rowland when incumbent Treasurer Christopher Burnham resigned to work for an investment firm. At the time Silvester was the youngest state treasurer in the US. He left office in 1999 after losing the 1998 general election to Democratic nominee Denise Nappier.

== Investigation ==
Soon after Silvester left office in January 1999, the FBI and SEC began investigating him and his close associates while in office. Silvester's campaign was referred by the United States Attorney to the State Elections Enforcement Commission for fundraising irregularities. The commission found that during Silvester's 1998 campaign a number of individuals connected to the campaign and Silvester had made illegal contributions to Paul Silvester for State Treasurer. The commission assessed multiple civil penalties against those responsible as well as requiring parties to enter into a consent agreement.

A scheme was discovered by incoming Treasurer Denise Nappier. Nappier alleged that Silvester had moved so much of the State Retirement and Trust Fund into high-risk, long term, non-liquid private equity funds that it unbalanced the State's investment plan, increasing the risk of a long term failure.

Silvester was accused of diverting State Pension and Trust Fund business to specific investment firms in return for kickbacks. These kickbacks came in a number of forms, but primarily took the form of no-work consulting and lobbying contracts provided to Silvester and close associates. The scheme was alleged to have netted $2.25 million in false fees and kickbacks.

== Sentences ==
In 2003, Silvester pleaded guilty and was sentenced to 51 months in prison. He had faced up to 40 years in prison. The sentence was especially lenient because Silvester agreed to cooperate in taking down a wider network of racketeers and corrupt government officials.

Silvester's brother, Mark Silvester, pleaded guilty to conspiracy to solicit and accept corrupt payments. His brother-in-law Peter D. Hirschl pleaded guilty to conspiracy to launder money. George Gomes, Connecticut's Assistant Treasurer, pleaded guilty to mail fraud. Silvester's campaign manager and mistress, Lisa A. Thiesfield, was sentenced to six months of house arrest, three years of probation, and a $50,000 fine. Former Connecticut Senate Majority Leader William A. DiBella received no prison time but was forced to return illegal profits from the scheme and pay civil penalties totaling $795,000.

== Prison and post-release ==
In 2003 Silvester was ordered to serve 28 more months in prison. The U.S. Attorney's Office commented that "The sentence imposed today is not only reflective of Paul Silvester's criminal wrongdoing but also of his admission of guilt and substantial cooperation in the investigation and prosecution of other individuals involved in this treasurer's office scandal. Post-release he went to work at Harrison, New York based metal trading company PM Recovery, Inc. and as of 2019 was their Executive Vice President of Finance.

Party political offices
Preceded by Christopher Burnham	Republican nominee for Connecticut State Treasurer; 1998	Succeeded by Ross Garber
Political offices
Preceded by Christopher Burnham	Treasurer of Connecticut; 1997–1999	Succeeded by Denise Nappier
