= Henry E. Parker =

American politician (1928–2018)

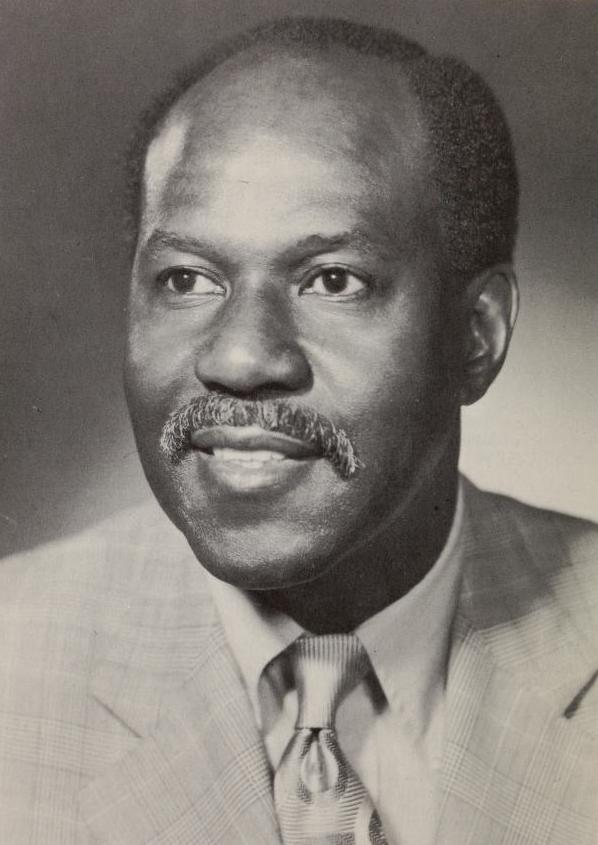
- Parker in 1976

Connecticut State Treasurer
- In office January 8, 1975 – February 3, 1986
- Preceded by: Alden A. Ives
- Succeeded by: Joan R. Kemler

Personal details
- Born: Henry Ellsworth Parker; February 14, 1928 Baltimore, Maryland, US
- Died: September 29, 2018 (aged 90) New Haven, Connecticut, US
- Party: Democratic Party
- Spouse: Janette Parker
- Education: Hampton Institute (BS); Southern Connecticut State University (MS)
- Nickname: Hank

Henry Ellsworth Parker (February 14, 1928 – September 29, 2018) was an American politician who served as Connecticut State Treasurer from 1975 to 1986. These 11 years represented the office's second-longest modern tenure, surpassed only by Denise Nappier's 20 years in the office. Parker was the second African American to be elected treasurer in Connecticut, after Gerald Lamb. Since Parker ran in 1974, the Democratic Party has always nominated an African American for state treasurer. Parker also ran three times for New Haven mayor in 1969, 1971, and 1979.

== Early life and career ==
Parker was born on February 14, 1928, in Baltimore, Maryland, to parents Henry L. and Daisy Parker. One of six children, he grew up in poverty during the Great Depression. He was a star athlete at the Frederick Douglass High School, captaining the football and basketball teams and serving as the student council president. On graduating in 1946, he received a scholarship to Lincoln University in Pennsylvania. When the scholarship fell through, Parker enlisted in the United States Army, serving in the Korean War. Declining an invitation to play for the Harlem Globetrotters after his military service ended, Parker instead enrolled at the Hampton Institute, graduating with his bachelor's degree in education in 1956.

In 1959, Parker moved to New Haven, Connecticut, where he directed the city's first community school. He earned a Master of Science degree in education from Southern Connecticut State University in 1965, writing his thesis on "The Implication of National Emphasis on Physical Fitness for Physical Education." His wife, Janette Parker, was a member of the Connecticut House of Representatives from 1991 to 1993.

== Political career ==
Parker rose to prominence in the 1960s as a community organizer and, in 1967, as founder and first chair of New Haven's Black Coalition. He ran for the Democratic mayoral nomination in 1969 and again in 1971, winning 34% and 42% of the vote. While unsuccessful, Parker strengthened African American constituencies' influence in the Democratic Party, traditionally dominated by Italian and Irish establishment figures. The political base he developed during these campaigns cemented his status in the Democratic Party and made a run for statewide office likely during the 1970s.

Parker ran for the elected office of Connecticut State Treasurer in 1974. He defeated former Republican state senator John Zajac by a margin of over 200,000 votes and was sworn in on January 8, 1975. As the state's chief financial officer, Parker oversaw the state's cash and debt management, including a $1 billion pension investment fund and $500 million in short-term investments. He also oversaw state agencies that administered low-income housing, pollution control, and business development. He reorganized the state's investment portfolio, shifting from stocks to bonds and reducing the $159 million loss in the pension investment fund to about $34 million over three years. In a single year, he slashed the state's borrowing by $12 billion. He also created a $450 million home mortgage program to help cities. He wrote a New York Times opinion in 1979 highlighting the role of the state treasury in promoting corporate social responsibility among banks.

Parker was reelected in November 1978, defeating the Republican nominee, Margaret Melady of Fairfield, by a wide margin. He was reelected for a third time in 1982, defeating Republican challenger John T. Becker of Greenwich. Parker served under governors Ella Grasso and William A. O'Neill. He chaired the Governor's Task Force on South Africa, which crafted first-in-the-nation anti-apartheid legislation. He helped lead the campaign that made Martin Luther King Jr.'s birthday a state holiday in 1976, seven years before it became a federal holiday.

Parker ran for New Haven mayor for the third time in 1979 but once again lost the primary. New Haven's first Black mayor would be John C. Daniels, elected in 1989.

Effective February 3, 1986, Parker resigned to serve as senior vice president of the Atalanta Sosnoff Capital Corporation in New York City. He retired in 1997.

Parker received the NAACP New Haven Chapter's Lifetime Achievement Award in 2010.

== Personal life ==
Parker married Janette Johnson of Poughkeepsie, New York, in 1959. The couple had two children: Janet and Curtis. Parker died on September 29, 2018. His wife survived him.

Party political offices
Preceded by John F. Merchant	Democratic nominee for Connecticut State Treasurer; 1974, 1978, 1982	Succeeded by Francisco L. Borges
Political offices
Preceded by Alden A. Ives	State Treasurer of Connecticut; 1975–1986	Succeeded by Joan R. Kemler
