= Financial Guaranty Insurance Company =

American company

- Industry: Monoline bond insurer
- Founded: 1983
- Headquarters: United States

Financial Guaranty Insurance Company (FGIC) is an American monoline bond insurer established in 1983. It faced significant financial difficulties in 2008 which affected its ability to write new business. The firm was acquired in December 2003 by a consortium of investors including PMI Group, The Blackstone Group, The Cypress Group and CIVC Partners.

As of March 24, 2009, it was rated "CC" by Standard & Poor's (S&P) and "Caa3" by Moody's Investors Service. Fitch Ratings had already withdrawn its rating, while Moody's announced it would remove its rating. The ratings are negative from both Moody's and Standard & Poor's.

On November 24, 2009, it was released that the New York Insurance Department ordered FGIC to suspend payment on all claims due. On June 11, 2012, the company was placed under rehabilitation by the Department.

On April 9, 2014, the Detroit News reported that FGIC without any City of Detroit or court involvement had solicited bids for the Detroit Institute of Arts collection. The city had previously hired Christie's to estimate the value and worked out a plan with philanthropic groups in Michigan to preserve one of the nation's best art collections.

Six months later, on October 16, lawyers for FGIC and Detroit disclosed in court that they had reached a settlement of FGIC's claims against the city. Under the deal, which must still be approved by the court along with other issues in the Detroit bankruptcy, the city and the state of Michigan would pay for the demolition of Joe Louis Arena, currently home to the Detroit Red Wings of the NHL. The arena site is planned to be available for transfer in 2017 when the Red Wings move into Little Caesars Arena. FGIC would then receive the arena site and an adjacent parking lot, giving the company nearly 9 acres (3.6 ha) that it would then redevelop.
