= Ambac =

American financial services company

Ambac Financial Group, Inc.
- Type: Public
- Traded as: NYSE: AMBC (common stock)
- Industry: Financial services
- Founded: New York City, U.S. (1971)
- Headquarters: New York City, U.S.,
- Revenue: ▲US$3.91 Billion (FY 2009)
- Operating income: ▲US$725 Million (FY 2009)
- Net income: ▼US$-14.6 Million (FY 2009)
- Total assets: ▲US$18.9 Billion (FY 2009)
- Total equity: ▲US$-2.29 Billion (FY 2009)
- Number of employees: 113
- Subsidiaries: Ambac Assurance Corporation; Everspan Financial Insurance Company
- Website: ambac.com

The Ambac Financial Group, Inc., generally known as Ambac (originally the American Municipal Bond Assurance Corporation), is an American holding company. Its subsidiaries provide financial guarantee products such as bond insurance to clients in both the public and private sectors globally. Ambac Assurance is a guarantor of public finance and structured finance obligations. Its common stock and common stock purchase warrants are listed on the NYSE under the symbols AMBC and AMBCW respectively. Ambac is regulated by the insurance commission of Wisconsin. It has its headquarters in Lower Manhattan, New York City.

Ambac Financial Group's subsidiaries include Ambac Assurance Corporation and Everspan Financial Insurance Company.

== History and Credit ratings ==
Ambac, originally American Municipal Bond Assurance Corporation, was founded in 1971 in Milwaukee, Wisconsin as a subsidiary of MGIC Investment Corp. to insure the principal and interest of municipal bonds against default. In 1985, Citibank (the principal subsidiary of Citicorp) acquired majority control of Ambac Inc., parent company of AMBAC. Other investors, including Xerox Corp., Ambac management, and Stephens Inc., an investment banking firm, held the remaining equity. In 1989, Citibank gained sole ownership of the municipal bond insurer, purchasing the remaining shares it had not already secured from its former partners. Citibank, trying to exit the business initiated the IPO of Ambac in 1990 and sold all its remaining shares in the Company in February 1992. In 1997, the company changed its name to reflect its expansion into new areas of business. Ambac Inc. was renamed Ambac Financial Group, Inc. The municipal insurance subsidiary was renamed Ambac Assurance.

Ambac and other bond guarantors such as MBIA were hit hard by the 2007 subprime mortgage financial crisis and on January 18, 2008, its Fitch credit rating was lowered from AAA (the highest) to AA when its plans to raise two billion dollars in new capital failed. Moody's and S&P, however, chose to affirm Ambac's AAA with their agencies after it succeeded in raising $1.5 billion in new capital in March 2008. In early 2008, the spectre of the major bond guarantors failing to be able to pay off insurance claims on a trillion dollars of securities backed by sub-prime mortgages and other securitized debt led to attempts to shore them up with infusions of capital. On June 19, 2008, Moody's downgraded Ambac's credit rating three notches to Aa3.

Ambac's ratings continued to decline during 2008–2010. Moody's Investors Service lowered the rating of the senior unsecured debt of Ambac Financial Group Inc. (Ambac Financial) to C from Ca and placed the Caa2 insurance financial strength ratings (IFSR) of Ambac Assurance Corporation (AAC) on review for possible upgrade on 3/26/2010. On March 25, 2010, Standard & Poor's Ratings Services revised its counterparty credit, financial strength and financial enhancement ratings on Ambac Assurance Corp. (Ambac) to 'R' from 'CC'. An 'R' rating is a non-investment grade rating. On June 8, 2010, Ambac announced that it would likely seek a pre-packaged bankruptcy as it was unable to pay dividends from its bond insurance unit to the holding company. Since that time Ambac has dropped appreciably in share price to approximately 0.50 per share as of the end of August 2010.

Ambac missed an interest payment on its debt on November 1, 2010 and filed for Chapter 11 bankruptcy protection on November 8, 2010. Ambac exited Chapter 11 on May 1, 2013, issuing 45 million new common shares and approximately 5 million new warrants to holders of allowed claims.

After serving as interim President and CEO, and then Executive Chairman in 2015, the Board formally appointed Tavakoli to the position of President and CEO in January 2016. Tavakoli helped lead a turnaround during his tenure that included "substantial progress" in areas such as "risk and loss analytics, operational efficiency, asset management, shareholder communication, and loss management, including our major loss recovery cases."

Tavakoli was succeeded by current CEO Claude LeBlanc in 2017.

With the leadership of Claude LeBlanc, on February 12, 2018, Ambac Assurance's Segregated Account exited rehabilitation through a holistic restructuring transaction and is now paying claims in full in cash.

In May 2020, Ambac Financial Group, Inc. has confirmed that Ambac Assurance has lodged a lawsuit for the District of Puerto Rico in the United States District Court against the Puerto Rico Financial Oversight & Management Board.

In December 2020 Ambac launched its new business strategy with the purchase of 80% of Xchange, a managing general underwriter. In February 2021, Ambac launched a specialty program insurance business, Everspan Group, which includes Everspan Indemnity Company, an excess and surplus lines carrier and Everspan Insurance Company, an admitted carrier.
