= Bond insurance =

Type of insurance

Bond insurance, also known as "financial guaranty insurance", is a type of insurance whereby an insurance company guarantees scheduled payments of interest and principal on a bond or other security in the event of a payment default by the issuer of the bond or security. It is a form of "credit enhancement" that generally results in the rating of the insured security being the higher of (i) the claims-paying rating of the insurer or (ii) the rating the bond would have without insurance (also known as the "underlying" or "shadow" rating).

The insurer is paid a premium by the issuer or owner of the security to be insured. The premium may be paid as a lump sum or in installments. The premium charged for insurance on a bond is a measure of the perceived risk of failure of the issuer. It can also be a function of the interest savings realized by an issuer from employing bond insurance or the increased value of the security realized by an owner who purchased bond insurance.

Bond insurers are "monoline" by statute, which means that companies that write bond insurance do not participate in other lines of insurance such as life, health, or property and casualty. The term monoline does not mean that insurers operate only in one securities market, such as municipal bonds, as the term has sometimes been misconstrued. Although bond insurers are not the only monoline insurers, they are sometimes colloquially called "the monolines". Bonds insured by these companies are sometimes said to be "wrapped" by the insurer.

Bond insurers generally insure only securities that have underlying or "shadow" ratings in the investment grade category, with unenhanced ratings ranging from "triple-B" to "triple-A".

== Benefits ==
=== Value to issuers ===
The economic value of bond insurance to the governmental unit, agency, or other issuer of the insured bonds or other securities is the result of the savings on interest costs, which reflects the difference between yield payable on an insured bond and yield payable on the same bond if it was uninsured—which is generally higher.

Borrowing costs are generally reduced for issuers of insured bonds because investors are prepared to accept a lower interest rate in exchange for the credit enhancement provided by the insurance. The interest savings are generally shared between the issuer (as its incentive to use the insurance) and the insurer (as its insurance premium). Since an issuer has the option of selling its securities with or without insurance, it will generally only use insurance when doing so results in overall cost savings. Municipal bond insurance premiums are generally paid up-front as a lump sum; while non-municipal bond insurance premiums are generally paid in periodic installments over time.

In July 2008, the Association of Financial Guaranty Insurers ("AGFI"), the trade association of financial guaranty insurers and reinsurers, estimated that, since its inception in 1971, the bond insurance industry had saved municipal bond issuers and their taxpayers $40 billion.

A majority of insured securities today are municipal bonds issued by states, local governments and other governmental bodies in the United States and in certain other countries. Bond insurance has also been applied to infrastructure project financing, such as those for public-private partnerships, bonds issued by non-U.S. regulated utilities, and U.S. and non-U.S. asset-backed securities ("ABS"). Financial guaranty insurers withdrew from the residential mortgage-backed securities ("RMBS") market after the 2008 financial crisis.

=== Value to investors ===
Investors purchasing or holding insured securities benefit from the additional payment source provided by the insurer if the issuer fails to pay principal or interest when due (which reduces the probability of a missed payment to the probability that not only the issuer but also the insurer defaults).

The value proposition of bond insurance includes the insurers' credit selection, underwriting, and surveillance of the underlying transactions. Significantly, uninsured transactions are often not monitored by rating agencies following their initial rating issuance. In the event of default of such transactions, bond trustees often fail to take appropriate remedial actions absent direction and indemnity from the bondholders (which is typically not forthcoming). In contrast, bond insurers frequently have the ability to work directly with issuers either to avoid defaults in the first place or to restructure debts on a consensual basis, without the need to obtain agreement from hundreds of individual investors. Litigation to obtain recovery, should it be necessary, is the insurer's responsibility, not the investor's.

The insurance may also improve market liquidity for the insured securities. The uninsured bonds of an individual issuer may trade infrequently, while bonds trading in the insurer's name are more likely to be actively traded on a daily basis.

Investors in insured bonds are also protected from rating downgrades of issuers, so long as the insurer is more highly rated than the issuer.

Following the 2008 financial crisis, municipal market events have helped to refocus investors and issuers on the benefits that bond insurance provides. A number of well-publicized municipal defaults, bankruptcies and restructurings occurred, which proved that bond insurance remains valuable in the public finance market. For example, holders of insured bonds were kept whole by Assured Guaranty and National Public Finance Guarantee in situations involving Detroit, Michigan; Jefferson County, Alabama; Harrisburg, Pennsylvania; Stockton, California and Puerto Rico. In the secondary market, insured bonds have generally exhibited significant price stability relative to comparable uninsured bonds of distressed issuers. Additionally, investors were spared the burdens of negotiating or litigating to defend their rights.

Although the 2008 financial crisis caused most bond insurers to cease issuing insurance policies, the insurance has continued to remain available from highly rated providers, including legacy insurers and new industry participants.

== History: 1970s–2008 ==
Prior to the 2008 financial crisis, bond insurers suffered few material losses. Notable exceptions in the municipal sector include:

- a 1984 Ambac loss on its exposure to the Washington Public Power Supply System (WPPSS), which helped establish the value of bond insurance; and
- a 1998 MBIA loss on its exposure to Allegheny Health, Education and Research Foundation (AHERF), which declared bankruptcy.

As publicbonds.org points out, a 1994 BusinessWeek article called MBIA "an almost perfect money machine". The BusinessWeek story noted that, as of that time, MBIA had seen only one loss.

By the late 1990s and early 2000s, about 50% of U.S. municipal bonds were insured.

Although penetration of insurance in the municipal bond market is far lower today than when numerous triple-A insurers were active, the ability of Assured Guaranty to continue insuring municipal bonds that were issued during a prolonged period of low interest rates and narrow credit spreads is evidence that a market continues to exist for municipal bond insurance.

=== Timeline ===
1971 saw the introduction of municipal bond insurance in the U.S. by American Municipal Bond Assurance Corp. (subsequently renamed AMBAC and later "Ambac"). Ambac was the first separately capitalized insurance company formed for the purpose of insuring bonds. In 1973 Municipal Bond Insurance Association (subsequently renamed "MBIA") formed, followed by Financial Guaranty Insurance Company ("FGIC") in 1983. Financial Security Assurance Inc. ("FSA", now known as Assured Guaranty Municipal) formed in 1985. FSA was the first bond insurer organized to insure non-municipal bonds, and it established the business of insuring asset-backed securities (ABS). These became known as the "big four" bond insurers.

By 1980, about 2.5% of long-term municipal bonds were insured.

In 1983, the Washington Public Power Supply System (WPPSS) defaulted on $2.25 billion of revenue bonds relating to troubled nuclear power projects. Most of the 30,000 bondholders lost 60-90 cents on the dollar. Ambac had insured a small portion of the bonds, and holders of the insured debt received full and timely payment from Ambac, which demonstrated the value of bond insurance to the market. This proved to be a watershed moment for the bond insurance industry, igniting steady growth in demand for many years.

During the 1980s, other participants emerged in the sector including Bond Investors Guaranty Insurance Company ("BIG") (1985) and Capital Markets Assurance Corp. ("CapMac") (1988), both of which were subsequently acquired by MBIA; Capital Guaranty Corp. (1986), which was subsequently acquired by FSA; and College Construction Loan Insurance Corporation ("Connie Lee") (1987), which was subsequently acquired by Ambac.

The 1980s also saw the birth of monoline financial guaranty reinsurance companies, including Enhance Reinsurance Company ("Enhance Re") (1986) and Capital Reinsurance Company (1988).

FSA insured the first collateralized debt obligation ("CDO") in 1988, and experienced only minor losses in the asset-backed securities (ABS) sector before the 2008 financial crisis.

In 1989, New York State enacted a new Article 69 of the New York State Insurance Law, which established "financial guaranty insurance" as a separate line of insurance. Article 69 excluded financial guaranty insurers from coverage under the property/casualty insurers security fund, which covered payments owed by insolvent insurers. It also established financial guaranty insurance as a monoline business, limiting industry members to writing bond insurance and closely related lines of insurance that include surety, credit, and residual-value insurance. The monoline restriction also prevented other types of insurance companies from offering financial guaranty insurance. A cited rationale for the monoline approach was to simplify regulation and help ensure capital adequacy.

The 1990s saw industry members insure both municipal bonds and asset-backed securities (ABS). At the same time, the industry expanded into overseas markets in Europe, Asia, Australia, and Latin America.

In the late 1990s and early 2000s, a new group of bond insurers emerged. These included ACA Financial Guaranty Corp. (1997); XL Capital Assurance Inc. ("XLCA") (2000), a subsidiary of XL Capital Ltd. that was spun off in 2006 and subsequently renamed "Syncora Guarantee Inc."; and CIFG (2001). This era also saw the emergence of new reinsurers, such as Ram Reinsurance Company Ltd. ("Ram Re") and AXA Re Finance.

In 1999, ACE Ltd. acquired Capital Re, and renamed the company "ACE Capital Re." ACE Capital Re was spun off from ACE Ltd. in 2004 and renamed Assured Guaranty Corp. ("AGC"). AGC's parent holding company, Assured Guaranty Ltd. ("Assured Guaranty"), engaged through its subsidiaries in both financial guaranty insurance – through AGC—and reinsurance—through Assured Guaranty Re Ltd. ("AG Re").

In 1999, the New York State Insurance Department (NYID) issued guidance regarding insurance of obligations under credit default swaps, which facilitated the participation by financial guaranty insurers in the CDS market. The NYID guidance was subsequently codified by amendments to Article 69 of the New York Insurance Law.

In 2001, Radian Group Inc. acquired Enhance Reinsurance Company and its affiliate, Asset Guaranty Insurance Company, renaming the companies Radian Reinsurance Inc. and Radian Asset Assurance Inc. ("Radian Asset"), respectively. Both companies engaged in financial guaranty insurance and reinsurance. In June 2004, Radian Reinsurance and Radian Asset Assurance merged, with the surviving corporation being Radian Asset.

== 2008 financial crisis ==
=== Events ===
Bond insurers had guaranteed the performance of residential mortgage-backed securities (RMBS) since the 1980s, but their guaranties of that asset class expanded at an accelerated pace in the 2000s leading up to the 2008 financial crisis. Bond insurers were also exposed to residential mortgage debt through collateralized loan obligations (CLOs) and collateralized debt obligations (CDOs) backed by subprime mortgage debt. The insurers had sold credit default swap (CDS) protection on specific tranches of CDOs. This business contributed to the monolines' growth in the early 2000s, with $3.3 trillion insured in 2006, with that contingent liability backed by approximately $47 billion of claims-paying resources. These exposures were all in compliance with Article 69 of the New York Insurance Law and other states' financial guaranty insurance statutes and with capital adequacy guidelines set by the rating agencies.

As the housing bubble grew in the mid-2000s, bond insurers generally increased the collateral protection required for the RMBS they guaranteed. But when the housing market declined, defaults soared to record levels on subprime mortgage loans and new types of adjustable rate mortgage (ARM) loans—interest-only, option-ARM, stated-income, and so-called "no income no asset" (NINA) loans—that had been developed and issued in anticipation of continuing appreciation in housing prices. The subsequent real estate market decline was unprecedented in its severity and geographic distribution across the U.S., and was not anticipated by the bond insurers or the rating agencies that evaluated their creditworthiness.

Unlike many other types of insurance, bond insurance generally provides an unconditional and irrevocable guaranty—although the insurers reserve the right to pursue contractual and other available remedies. As a result, the bond insurers faced billions of dollars of claims on insured RMBS, with uncertain prospects for recoveries from the sponsors (creators) of those RMBS. Monoline insurers posted higher reserves for losses as these insured securities appeared headed for default.

Following the crisis, the bond insurers became aware that many RMBS they had insured included large percentages of loans that were ineligible for securitization, i.e., they should not have been in the RMBS and were subject to repurchase by the RMBS sponsors. As provided under the insurance contracts, the insurers "put back" to the sponsors such loans, which breached applicable representations and warranties ("R&W") regarding what was in the securitizations, i.e., they demanded the sponsors buy the loans out of the pool, as required under the contracts. Such "putbacks" have remained subject to litigation into the second decade following the 2008 financial crisis.

One indication of the extent of loan quality misrepresentation was a 2011 settlement between Assured Guaranty and Bank of America, which had purchased mortgage originator Countrywide. Under the terms of the settlement, Bank of America made a $1.1 billion payment to Assured Guaranty and agreed to cover 80% of up to $6.6 billion of Assured Guaranty's future paid losses from breaches of representations and warranties on 21 insured RMBS transactions. Subsequently, in 2013, in the first R&W trial to reach a judgment, Flagstar Bank was required to compensate Assured Guaranty in full for past and future claims. The amounts that Assured Guaranty caused R&W providers to pay or commit to pay through putbacks and settlements plus the amount of future projected losses that Assured Guaranty avoided through negotiated terminations totaled approximately $4.2 billion as of March 31, 2015.

While the widespread misrepresentations caused bond insurers to experience considerable losses on insured securities backed by residential mortgage loans (including first lien loans, second lien loans, and home equity lines of credit), the most severe losses were experienced by those that insured CDOs backed by mezzanine RMBS. Although the bond insurers generally insured such CDOs at very high attachment points or collateral levels (with underlying ratings of triple-A), those bond insurers and the rating agencies failed to anticipate the correlation of performance of the underlying securities. Specifically, these bond insurers and rating agencies relied on historical data that did not prove predictive of residential mortgage loan performance following the 2008 crisis, which witnessed the first-ever nationwide decline in housing prices. Notably, AGM and AGC did not insure such CDOs, which has allowed Assured Guaranty to continue writing business throughout the 2008 financial crisis and ensuing recession and recovery.

=== Impacts on individual companies; regulatory response ===
The 2008 financial crisis precipitated many changes in the bond insurance industry, including rating agency downgrades, several companies ceasing to write new business, dramatic share value reductions, and consolidation among the insurers. The industry's primary regulators in New York also took action, as did their counterparts in Wisconsin.

On November 7, 2007, ACA, the only single-A rated insurer, reported a $1 billion loss, wiping out equity and resulting in negative net worth. On November 19, ACA noted in a 10-Q that if downgraded below single-A-minus, it would have to post collateral to comply with standard insurance agreements, and that—based on current fair values—the firm would be unable to do so. On December 13, 2007, ACA's stock was delisted from the New York Stock Exchange due to low market price and negative net worth, although ACA retained its single-A rating. On December 19, 2007, the company was downgraded to triple-C by Standard & Poor's.

Downgrades of major triple-A monolines began in December 2007, resulting in downgrades of thousands of municipal bonds and structured financings insured by the companies.

In 2007 Warren Buffett's Berkshire Hathaway Assurance entered the market.

Also during this time, credit default swap markets quoted rates for monoline default protection that would have been typical for below-investment-grade credits. Structured credit issuance ceased, and many municipal bond issuers went to market without bond insurance.

By January 2008, many insured municipal and institutional bonds were trading at prices as if they were uninsured, effectively discounting the financial guaranty insurance completely. The slow reaction of the rating agencies in acknowledging this situation echoed their slow downgrading of subprime mortgage debt a year earlier.

In 2008, the New York State Insurance Department (NYID) issued "Circular Letter No. 19", which described "best practices" for financial guaranty insurers, particularly relating to categories of securities that had damaged the industry in the 2008 financial crisis.

In 2009, Assured Guaranty acquired FSA and subsequently renamed it Assured Guaranty Municipal ("AGM"), combining under the same ownership the two most highly rated bond insurers at that time. Assured Guaranty became the only bond insurer to write insurance continuously from the pre-crisis period to the present.

Also in 2009, MBIA separated its municipal bond insurance business from its other mostly asset-backed business, and formed National Public Finance Guarantee Corp. ("National") as an investment-grade insurer with the municipal bond insurance business that had previously resided in MBIA.

Continuing the trend of reorganization in 2008, Ambac ceased writing business and in 2010 was split into (i) a "segregated account" (with liability for asset-backed and certain other troubled policies) subject to a rehabilitation overseen by the Wisconsin Office of the Commissioner of Insurance and (ii) a "general account" for municipal bond insurance and certain other non-troubled policies. On November 8, 2010, Ambac's holding company filed for Chapter 11 bankruptcy.

By order of the New York State Insurance Department, FGIC ceased paying claims in 2010 and is in run-off, now paying claims in part.

Syncora Guarantee Inc. ("Syncora"), CIFG, Radian Asset and Ram Re remained solvent but have generally not written new business.

Ram Re has been renamed American Overseas Reinsurance Company Ltd. and has redomesticated to Barbados. The company never filed for bankruptcy and is writing new lines of insurance while it runs off its financial guaranty book.

In January 2012, Assured Guaranty acquired a bond insurance subsidiary that was owned by Radian Asset but never launched, renamed it Municipal Assurance Corp. ("MAC"), and launched the new company as a municipal-only bond insurer in July 2013.

In July 2012, Build America Mutual ("BAM") began operations as a mutually owned municipal-only bond insurer.

In December 2014, Assured Guaranty acquired Radian Asset, which was fully merged into Assured Guaranty Corp. ("AGC") in April 2015.

In July 2016, Assured Guaranty acquired CIFG, which was merged into AGC.

In January 2017, Assured acquired MBIA UK Insurance Limited ("MBIA UK") and renamed it Assured Guaranty (London) Ltd.

In June 2017, Standard and Poor's lowered the financial strength ratings of National to A from AA− and lowered the long-term counterparty rating of MBIA Inc. to BBB from A− Subsequent to the downgrade, MBIA announced that National would cease, for the time being, the pursuit of new bond insurance business.

In January 2018, Syncora Guarantee announced a successful merger of its subsidiary Syncora Capital Assurance Inc. ("SCAI") into its wholly owned subsidiary, Syncora Guarantee Inc. ("SGI"), with SGI being the surviving entity. In the following month, Syncora and Assured Guaranty announced that Assured would reinsure approximately $13.5 billion of SGI-insured policies and provide certain administrative services to SGI with respect to the reinsured policies. In June 2018, Assured Guaranty announced that it had completed the reinsurance transaction. Both companies said that the transaction would strengthen their financial positions.

In February 2018, Ambac Assurance Corporation completed rehabilitation of its Segregated Account. The conclusion of the rehabilitation followed the successful completion of Ambac's surplus note exchange offers and consent solicitation, which, together with the satisfaction of all remaining conditions, completed a holistic restructuring transaction that had been announced in 2017. Ambac Assurance Corporation currently pays all claims in full and in cash.

As a result of its multiple acquisitions, by 2017 Assured Guaranty owned four different European subsidiaries, which it merged into a single entity in November 2018, named Assured Guaranty (Europe) Ltd.

== Critiques of the business; rating agencies ==
Some have criticized the whole business model of financial guaranty insurance. In her book Confidence Game, Christine S. Richard examined the industry's basic assumptions. She argued that a monoline's business can be seen as the sale of a triple-A credit rating to a municipal bond issuer. She noted that the rating agencies had different rating scales for municipal issuers and non-municipal issuers (e.g., corporations). Some argued that if the rating agencies had rated municipalities on the same scale they used to rate corporations, the municipalities would have been higher rated, obviating the need for bond insurance.

The question was debated before Congress in 2008, at the House Committee on Financial Services under Barney Frank. Richard Blumenthal, then-attorney general of Connecticut, Ajit Jain of Berkshire Hathaway, then-Superintendent Eric Dinallo of the New York State Insurance Department, and a Moody's representative were also in attendance.

Standard & Poor's Ratings Services has denied that it employed or employs a separate rating scale for municipal and non-municipal issues. Moody's Investors Service acknowledged that it employed separate rating scales for municipal and non-municipal issues, but has since adopted a uniform rating scale for all issues.

The argument that bond insurance provided no value in the municipal bond market was proven wrong not long after the 2008 congressional hearings. The following decade saw a number of significant municipal defaults, including the two largest – by Detroit and Puerto Rico. In both those cases and others, bond insurers kept insured bondholders whole.

Richard's book also described the role of hedge fund manager Bill Ackman (Gotham, Pershing Square), who grew increasingly suspicious of the viability of MBIA. Ackman believed the company had insufficient capital and he shorted it by purchasing credit default swaps on MBIA corporate debt. He also released reports to the public, regulators and other corporate executives.

Commentators such as investor David Einhorn have criticized rating agencies for being slow to act and for giving the monolines undeserved ratings that allowed them to be paid to "bless" bonds with these ratings.

== See also ==
- Credit default swap
- Credit Derivatives Product Company
- Credit rating agency
- Nuclear Implosions: The Rise and Fall of the Washington Public Power Supply System
