= MBIA =

American financial services company

MBIA Inc.
- Type: Public company
- Traded as: NYSE: MBI; Russell 2000 component
- Industry: Finance
- Headquarters: Purchase, New York, U.S.
- Revenue: ▼US$154 million (2022)
- Operating income: ▲US$−148 million (2022)
- Net income: ▲US$−195 million (2022)
- Total assets: ▼US$3.38 billion (2022)
- Total equity: ▼US$−876 million (2022)
- Number of employees: 75 (2022)
- Subsidiaries: MBIA Insurance; MBIA Capital
- Website: mbia.com

MBIA Inc. is an American financial services company. It was founded in 1973 as the Municipal Bond Insurance Association. It is headquartered in Purchase, New York, and as of January 1, 2015 had approximately 180 employees.

== Functions of the company ==
MBIA is a monoline insurer primarily of municipal bonds and on asset-backed securities and mortgage-backed securities. Financial insurance or Financial Guarantees are a form of credit enhancement. It also provides a fixed-income asset management service with about US$40 billion under management.

== History ==
A consortium of insurance companies (Aetna, Fireman's Fund, Travelers, Cigna, and Continental) formed the Municipal Bond Insurance Association in 1973 to diversify their holdings in municipal bonds. The company went public in 1987.

In 2002, Bill Ackman, a hedge fund manager, began research which concentrated on challenging MBIA's AAA rating, despite an ongoing probe of his trading by New York State and federal authorities. He was charged copying fees for copying 725,000 pages of statements regarding the financial services company, in his law firm's compliance with a subpoena. Ackman has called for a division between MBIA's bond insurers' structured finance business and their municipal bond insurance side, despite statements from the insurance companies that this would not be a viable option.

He argued that the billions of dollars of credit default swap (CDS) protection MBIA had sold against various mortgage backed CDOs was going to be a problem. He also argued that it was not proper for MBIA, which was legally restricted from trading in CDS, to instead do it through a second corporation, LaCrosse Financial Products, which MBIA described as an "orphaned subsidiary". Ackman bought CDS against MBIA corporate debt as a way to bet that it would crash. When MBIA did, in fact, crash as the 2008 financial crisis climaxed, he sold the swaps for a large profit. Ackman reportedly attempted to warn regulators, rating agencies and investors about the bond insurers' high risk business models. The story of Ackman's battle with MBIA was turned into a book called Confidence Game (Wiley, 2010) by Bloomberg News reporter Christine Richard. He reported covering his short position on MBIA on January 16, 2009 according to the 13D filed with the SEC.

In January 2017, MBIA UK was acquired by Assured Guaranty Ltd together with its subsidiary Assured Guaranty Corp.

== Credit rating history ==
- April 4, 2008. Fitch Ratings cut MBIA's Insurance Corp rating to AA from AAA with a negative outlook. Fitch issued the new, lower rating even though MBIA had asked the ratings company, the month before, to stop assessing its credit worthiness.
- June 4, 2008. Moody's Investors Service announced that it would review MBIA's rating for possible downgrade for the second time in the year. Four months before this announcement, in February 2008, Moody's had affirmed the AAA rating after MBIA raised $2.6 bn in capital and announced that would stop insuring structured finance securities for six months.
- June 6, 2008. Despite having affirmed MBIA's AAA rating in February 2008, Standard and Poor's decided to downgrade MBIA's Insurance Financial Strength (IFS) rating from AAA to AA.
- June 19, 2008. Moody's downgraded MBIA's credit rating 5 notches to A2.
- November 7, 2008. Moody's further downgraded the IFS rating to "Baa1" from "A2".
- June 25, 2009. Moody's downgraded MBIA from "Ba3" to "Ba1" which is a speculative grade.
- March 5, 2010. Moody's referred to MBIA's IFS rating as "B3".
- November 19, 2012. Moody's downgraded MBIA Inc. from "B3" to "Caa1".
- May 21, 2013. Moody's upgraded MBIA Inc. from "Caa1" to "B3".
- May 21, 2014. Moody's upgraded MBIA Inc. from "Ba3" to "Ba1".
