= Power (name) =

Power is a surname.

== People with the surname ==
- Alison Power, American biologist
- Arthur Power (1889–1960), British admiral
- Arthur Mackenzie Power (1921–1984), British admiral
- Camilla Power (born 1976), British actress
- Carla Power (active 2022), American author
- Cat Power (born Charlyn Marshall 1972), singer
- Catherine Power (disambiguation), or variants, several uses
- Charles Power (disambiguation), or variants, several uses
- David Power (disambiguation), or variants, several uses
- Darrell Power (born 1968), Canadian musician
- Darren Power, Australian politician
- Dermot Power, Irish artist
- Ethel B. Power (1881–1969), architectural writer and editor
- Frederick Belding Power (1853–1927), American chemist
- F. Danvers Power (1861–1955), Australian academic, geologist and metallurgist
- Glen Power (born 1978), drummer for The Script
- Harold Septimus Power (1877–1951) NZ-born Australian painter
- Harry Power (1819–1892), Australian bushranger
- Henry Power (1623–1668), English physician and experimenter
- Henry Power (footballer) (1904–1986), Australian rules footballer
- J. D. Power III (1931–2021), American founder of consumer research firm
- James Power (disambiguation), several uses
- Jeanne Villepreux-Power, (1794–1871), French marine biologist
- John Power (disambiguation), several uses
- Jonathon Power (born 1974), Canadian squash player
- Katherine Ann Power (born 1949), US ex-convict and long-term fugitive
- Lachlan Power (born 1995), Australian YouTuber
- Lawrence Geoffrey Power (1841–1921), Canadian politician
- Leonel Power (1370–1445), English composer
- Louis Power (1905–1988), Australian cricketer
- Luke Power (born 1980), Australian football player
- Manley Power (1773–1826), British general
- Manley Laurence Power (1904–1981), British admiral
- Marguerite Helen Power (1870–1957), Australian poet
- Max Power (footballer) (born 1993), English footballer
- Michael Power (disambiguation)
- Noel Power (1929–2009), Australian judge
- Owen Power (born 2002), Canadian ice hockey player
- Paddy Power (disambiguation), several uses
- Patrick Power (disambiguation), several uses
- Peter Power, Irish politician
- Philip Power (born 1952), American scientist
- Phil Power (born 1967), English football manager player
- Ramón Power y Giralt (1775–1813), Puerto Rican politician
- Richard Power (disambiguation), or variants, several uses
- Robbie Power (born 1982), Irish jockey
- Romina Power (born 1951), American singer and actress
- Rory Power, American author
- Samantha Power (born 1970), American academic
- Sean Power (disambiguation), several uses
- Seon Power (born 1984), Trinidadian footballer
- Simon Power (disambiguation), several uses
- Steve Power (born 1960), British record producer
- Susie Power (disambiguation), several names
- Taryn Power (1953–2020), American actress
- Thomas Power (disambiguation), or variants, several uses
- Tyrone Power (disambiguation), several uses
- Una Power, Irish card reader and radio presenter
- Victor Power (disambiguation), or Vic Power, several uses
- Will Power (disambiguation), several people
- William Power (disambiguation), several people
- W. Tyrone Power (1819–1911), Australian artist

== Fictional characters with the surname ==
- The Power Pack superhero team: Alex Power, Julie Power, Jack Power, and Katie Power
- Captain Jonathan Power, in the TV series Captain Power and the Soldiers of the Future
- James Power (comics), in Marvel comics
- Josiah Power, in DC Comics
- Michael Power (character), in Guinness advertising

== See also ==
- Paor (disambiguation), also de Paor, the Irish spelling of the name
- Power (disambiguation)#People
- Powers (name)
- David Baynton-Power (born 1961), British drummer
- Paul Scully-Power (born 1944), American oceanographer
