= Powers (name) =

Powers is a given name or surname.

== People with the given name ==
- Powers Boothe (1948–2017), American actor
- Powers Hapgood (1899–1949), American trade union organizer and Socialist Party leader

== People with the surname ==
- Abigail Fillmore (née Abigail Powers, 1798–1853), First Lady of the United States
- Abra J. Powers (1883-1971), American lawyer and politician
- Ada Weigel Powers (1863-1947), American composer
- Albert E. Powers (1816–1910), American President of Rensselaer Polytechnic Institute
- Ann Powers (born 1964), American writer and pop music critic
- Caleb Powers (1869–1932), US Representative from Kentucky
- Chet Powers (Chester William Powers Jr., 1937–1994), American singer-songwriter
- Claudia Powers (born 1950), American politician
- D. Lane Powers (1896–1968), US Representative from New Jersey
- Darrell Powers ("Shifty" Powers, 1923–2009), American WWII veteran portrayed in Band of Brothers
- Dave Powers (1932–2008), American television director and producer
- David Powers (1912–1998), Special Assistant to John F. Kennedy
- David B. Powers Jr. (1874–1936), Virginia politician
- David J. Powers (1814–1909), American businessman, co-founder of Whitewater, Wisconsin, and Palmyra, Wisconsin
- Doc Powers (Michael Riley Powers, 1870–1909) an American Major League Baseball player
- Georgia Davis Powers (1923–2016), Kentucky politician
- Gershom Powers (1789–1831), US Representative from New York
- Francis Gary Powers (1929–1977), American pilot who was shot down over the Soviet Union in 1960
- Hardy Powers (1900–1972), general superintendent in the Church of the Nazarene
- Harold Powers (1928–2007), American musicologist, ethnomusicologist, and music theorist
- Harold J. Powers (1900–1996), Lieutenant Governor of California
- Harriet Powers (1837–1910), African American slave, folk artist and noted quilt maker
- Hiram Powers (1805–1873), American neoclassical sculptor
- Horace Henry Powers (1835–1913), US Representative from Vermont
- J. F. Powers (1917–1999), American short story and novel writer
- Jack Powers (1827–1860), Irish-American gambler and gang leader
- James Powers (New York politician) (1785–1868), New York politician
- James F. Powers (1938–2012), New Hampshire politician
- Jessica Powers (1905–1988), American poet and Carmelite nun
- Jerraud Powers American football player
- Jim Powers (born 1958), American retired professional wrestler
- Joey Powers (1934–2017), American singer-songwriter
- John Powers (American football coach), college football co-head coach
- John Powers (baseball) (1929–2001), baseball outfielder
- John Powers (mayor), American politician, Mayor of Spokane, WA
- John A. Powers (1922–1979), public affairs officer for NASA
- John E. Powers (1910–1998), Massachusetts politician
- John Holbrook Powers (1831–1918), Nebraska pioneer
- John J. Powers (food scientist) (1918–2014), Food Science
- John James Powers (1912–1942), United States Navy officer and Medal of Honor recipient
- John R. Powers (1945–2013), American novelist and playwright
- John Robert Powers (1892–1977), American actor and owner of a modelling agency.
- John T. Powers, President of the Federal League of baseball
- Johnny Powers (1943–2022), originally named Dennis Waters, a Canadian professional wrestler
- Keith T. Powers (born 1992), American actor and model
- Kemp Powers, American playwright, screenwriter, and director
- Kevin Powers (born 1980), American writer and Iraq War veteran
- Kimberly Powers, American epidemiologist
- Kirsten Powers (born 1969), American columnist, blogger, pundit and political commentator
- Lauren Powers (born 1961), American actress, amateur bodybuilder and firefighter
- Leo J. Powers (1909–1967), US Army soldier and a recipient of the Medal of Honor
- Levi P. Powers (1828-1888), Wisconsin legislator and judge
- Lewis J. Powers (1837–1915), Massachusetts businessman and politician
- Llewellyn Powers (1836–1908), Governor of Maine, US Representative from Maine
- Madison Powers, American philosopher
- Mala Powers (1931–2007), American film actress and television guest actress
- Matilde Powers (born 1982), Danish politician
- Megan Powers, Trump campaign worker, former NASA press secretary
- Michelle Powers, American politician
- Mike Powers (disambiguation)
- Millard Powers (born 1965), American musician, songwriter, record producer and recording engineer
- Millard Powers Fillmore (1828–1889), son of US President Millard Fillmore
- Oswald A. Powers (1915–1942), US Navy officer and Navy Cross recipient
- PJ Powers (born 1960), a South African singer also known as Penelope Jane Dunlop and as Thandeka
- Pat Powers (businessman) (1870–1948), Irish-American businessman
- Patrick Powers (volleyball) (born 1958), American volleyball player
- Patrick T. Powers (1860–1925), American minor league baseball executive
- Preston Powers (1842–1904), American sculptor
- Ralph Ernest Powers (1875–1952), American mathematician
- Richard Powers (born 1957), American novelist
- Richie Powers (1930–1998), American professional basketball referee
- Ridgley C. Powers (1836–1912), Governor of Mississippi
- Ron Powers (born 1941), American journalist, novelist, and non-fiction writer
- Samuel L. Powers (1848–1929), US Representative from Massachusetts
- Stefanie Powers (born 1942), American actress and singer
- Stephen Powers (1840–1904), American journalist, ethnographer, and historian of Native American tribes in California
- Thomas Powers (born 1940), American author, intelligence expert, and recipient of the Pulitzer Prize
- Tim Powers (born 1952), American science fiction and fantasy author
- Tom Powers (1890–1957), American stage and film actor
- Victoria Powers (1958–2025), American mathematician
- Warren Powers (1941–2021), American football coach
- Warren Powers (American football) (born 1965), American football player
- William Powers (politician), Chairman of the New York Republican State Committee
- William C. Powers (1946–2019) the 28th president of The University of Texas at Austin
- William T. Powers (1926–2013), scholar of psychology theory
- William T. Powers (industrialist) (1820–1907), manufacturer and capitalist

== Fictional characters with the surname ==
- Austin Powers, fictional British spy portrayed by Mike Myers
- Douglas Powers, also known as Dr. Evil, Austin Powers' nemesis and secret twin brother
- Nigel Powers, the father of Austin and Douglas
- Kitty Powers, the drag queen persona of game developer Rich Franke and the titular character of Kitty Powers' Matchmaker
- Ruth Powers, character from The Simpsons
- Laura Powers (The Simpsons), character from The Simpsons
- Kenny Powers, character from Eastbound and Down
- Will Powers, character from Phoenix Wright: Ace Attorney

== See also ==
- Power (name)
- Powers (disambiguation)
