= Colli (surname) =

Colli is an Italian surname. Notable people with the surname include:

- Andrea Colli (born 1966), Italian academic
- Beatrice Colli (born 2004), Italian speed climber
- Daniele Colli (born 1982), Italian road cyclist
- Enrico Colli (1896–1982), Italian cross country skier
- Giorgio Colli (1917–1979), Italian philosopher
- Ilio Colli (1931–1953), Italian skier
- Michelangelo Alessandro Colli-Marchi (Michael Colli) (1738– 1808), Austrian general
- Ombretta Colli (born 1943), Italian singer and politician
- Piero Colli (1914–2010), Italian footballer
- Robert Colli (1898–1980), Austrian colonel of Nazi Germany.
- Tonino Delli Colli (1922–2005), Italian cinematographer
- Vincenzo Colli (1899–19??), Italian cross country skier
