= James Powers =

James Powers may refer to:

- J. F. Powers (James Farl Powers, 1917–1999), American novelist and short-story writer
- James Legrand Powers (1871–1927), founder of Powers Accounting Machine Company
- James Powers (New York politician) (1785–1868), New York politician
- James E. Powers (1931–2020), New York politician
- James F. Powers (1938–2012), New Hampshire politician
- James T. Powers (1862–1943), American stage actor, vocalist, and lyricist
- James Patrick Powers (born 1953), American Roman Catholic bishop
- James Powers (runner) (born 1892), American miler, runner-up at the 1916 USA Outdoor Track and Field Championships

== See also ==
- James Power (disambiguation) (Powers family name frequently confused with Power family name)
- Jim Powers (disambiguation), lists people with the name Jim Powers
- Powers (disambiguation) for a list of other uses of "Powers," including other people with the last name Powers
