= Powers =

Powers may refer to:

== Arts and media ==
- Powers (comics), a comic book series by Brian Michael Bendis and Michael Avon Oeming
  - Powers (American TV series), a 2015–2016 series based on the comics
- Powers (British TV series), a 2004 children's science-fiction series
- Powers (duo), an American pop group
- Powers (novel), an Annals of the Western Shore novel by Ursula K. Le Guin
- Powers: A Study in Metaphysics, a 2003 book by George Molnar
- Powers, a 2019 album by the Futureheads

== Businesses and organizations ==
- Powers (whiskey), a brand of Irish whiskey
- Powers Dry Goods, an American department store chain
- Powers Motion Picture Company, an American film company
- Powers Motorsports, an American racing team

== Places in the United States ==
=== Cities and communities ===
- Powers, Indiana
- Powers, Michigan
- Powers, Oregon
- Powers Coal Camp, Kentucky
- Powers Lake, North Dakota
- Powers Lake, Wisconsin
- Powers Township, Minnesota

=== Historic sites ===
- Powers Auditorium, in Youngstown, Ohio
- Powers Building, an office building in Rochester, New York
- Powers Church, a church in York Township, Indiana
- Powers Home, a house in Troy, New York
- Powers Hotel (disambiguation), two hotels
- Powers House (disambiguation), several houses
- Powers Institute Historic District, in Bernardston, Massachusetts

=== Natural features ===
- Powers Bluff, Wisconsin
- Powers Caldera, Hawaii
- Powers Creek, Missouri
- Powers Lake (Georgia)
- Powers Lake (Minnesota)

=== Parks ===
- Powers Field, a ballpark in Cheyenne, Wyoming
- Powers Marine Park, a park in Portland, Oregon

=== Schools ===
- Powers Catholic High School, Flint, Michigan, US
- Powers High School, Powers, Oregon, US
- Powers Music School, Belmont, Massachusetts, US

=== Transportation ===
- Powers Ferry, on the Chattahoochee River in Marietta, Georgia
- Powers Highway, or Oregon Route 542, in Coos County, Oregon

== Other uses ==
- Powers (angel), a rank in Christian angelology
- Powers (name), a given name and surname
- Powers Accounting Machine, an early 20th-century tabulating machine

== See also ==
- Justice Powers (disambiguation)
- Power (disambiguation)
- The Powers Girl, a 1943 musical comedy film about aspiring models employed by John Robert Powers' modeling agency
