= Powers Lake =

Powers Lake may refer to:

- Powers Lake (Georgia)
- Powers Lake (Meeker County, Minnesota)
- Powers Lake, North Dakota
- Powers Lake, Wisconsin
- Powers Lake, Connecticut
