= Paor =

Paor may refer to:

== People ==
- Enrico Paor (1896–1982), Italian cross country skier
- Ilio Paor (1931–1953), Italian cross country skier
- Louis de Paor (born 1961), Irish poet
- Máire de Paor (1925–1994), Irish historian and archaeologist
- Seán Óg De Paor (born 1970), Irish football player
- Vincenzo Paor (1899–1961), Italian cross country skier

== Places ==
- Northway Airport, Alaska (by ICAO code)
