= Tesei =

Tesei is a surname. Notable people with the surname include:

- Donatella Tesei (born 1958), Italian politician and lawyer
- Peter Tesei (born 1969), American politician
- Teseo Tesei (1909–1941), Italian naval officer

== See also ==
- Villa Tesei, town in Argentina
