= Tom Powers (disambiguation) =

Tom Powers was an actor.

Tom Powers may also refer to:

- Tom Powers (racing driver), former NASCAR driver
- Tom Powers, the fictional gangster played by James Cagney in The Public Enemy
- Tom Powers, a character in Tree Fu Tom
- Tom Powers, a notorious gambler and a friend of Pat Garrett

== See also ==
- Thomas Powers (disambiguation)
- Tom Power (1869–1898), American baseball player
- Tom Power (musician) (born 1987), Canadian musician and radio presenter
