= Thomas Power =

Thomas Power may refer to:

- Thomas C. Power (1839–1923), American politician
- Thomas G. Power (born 1950), judge and member of the Michigan House of Representatives
- Thomas S. Power (1905–1970), U.S. Air Force general
- Thomas "Ta" Power (died 1987), Irish nationalist
- Thomas Joseph Power (1830–1893), Roman Catholic priest and bishop of St. John's, Newfoundland
- Thomas Power (Newfoundland politician) (Thomas Joseph Power, 1886–1959), Newfoundland merchant and politician
- Thomas Power (Australian politician) (Thomas Herbert Power 1802–1873), auctioneer, pastoral agent and politician in colonial Victoria
- Tom Power (1869–1898), American baseball player
- Tom Power (musician) (born 1987), Canadian musician and broadcaster

== See also ==
- Thomas Power O'Connor, Irish nationalist
- Thomas Powers (disambiguation)
