= Power series (disambiguation) =

A power series is an infinite sum of monomials.

It may also refer to:

- IBM ThinkPad Power Series

Multiple TV series were titled Power or The Power:

- Power (TV series)
- The Power (TV series)

== See also ==
- Powers (disambiguation)
