= Charlie Power =

Charlie Power may refer to:

- Charlie Power (politician) (born 1948), Canadian politician
- Charlie Power (Canadian football) (born 1991), Canadian football running back

== See also ==
- Charles Power (disambiguation)
