= Lydia Stevens =

American politician (1918–2014)

Member of the Connecticut House of Representatives from the 151st district
- In office 1989–1993
- Preceded by: Emil Benvenuto
- Succeeded by: Claudia Powers

Personal details
- Born: August 2, 1918 Highland Park, Illinois, U.S.
- Died: February 25, 2014 (aged 95) Guilford, Connecticut, U.S.
- Party: Republican
- Spouse: George Cooke Stevens
- Education: Vassar College

Lydia Beebe Hastings Stevens (August 2, 1918 – February 25, 2014) was an American politician who served in the Connecticut House of Representatives from 1989 to 1993, representing the 151st district as a Republican.

== Personal life ==
Stevens was born in Highland Park, Illinois. She graduated from Vassar College in 1939. In 1940, she married George Cooke Stevens and eventually moved to Greenwich, Connecticut. She was involved in the community and was President of the Greenwich Broadcasting Company.

Stevens died in Guilford, Connecticut, on February 25, 2014. She was 95.

== Political career ==
Stevens was elected to the Connecticut House of Representatives in 1988, and she served two terms representing the 151st district as a Republican. She did not run for reelection in 1992 and was succeeded by Claudia Powers.
