= Connecticut's 151st House of Representatives district =

American legislative district

Connecticut's 151st State House of Representatives district
Representative
| Hector Arzeno; D |

Connecticut's 151st House of Representatives district elects one member of the Connecticut House of Representatives. It encompasses parts of Greenwich and has been represented by Democrat Hector Arzeno since 2023.

== List of representatives ==
List of Representatives from Connecticut's 151st State House District
| Representative | Party | Years | District home | Note |
|---|---|---|---|---|
| Michael L. Morano | Republican | 1967–1977 | Greenwich | Seat created |
| Emil Benvenuto | Republican | 1977–1989 | Greenwich | |
| Lydia Stevens | Republican | 1989–1993 | Greenwich | |
| Claudia Powers | Republican | 1993–2009 | Riverside | |
| Fred Camillo | Republican | 2009–2019 | Greenwich | |
| Harry Arora | Republican | 2020–2023 | Greenwich | |
| Hector Arzeno | Democratic | 2023–present | Cos Cob | |

== Recent Elections ==
=== 2024 ===
Connecticut's 151st House of Representatives district election, 2024
| Party | Candidate | Votes | % |
|---|---|---|---|
| Democratic | Hector Arzeno (incumbent) | 6,826 | 51.54% |
| Republican | Tod Laudonia | 6,418 | 48.46% |
| Total votes | | 13,244 | 100.0% |
| Democratic hold | | | |

=== 2022 ===
2022 Connecticut State House of Representatives election, 151st District
| Party | Candidate | Votes | % |
|---|---|---|---|
| Democratic | Hector Arzeno | 5,574 | 53.50 |
| Republican | Peter Sherr | 4,845 | 46.50 |
| Total votes | | 10,419 | 100.00 |
| Democratic gain from Republican | | | |

=== 2020 ===
2020 Connecticut State House of Representatives election, District 151
| Party | Candidate | Votes | % |
|---|---|---|---|
| Republican | Harry Arora (incumbent) | 7,332 | 53.10 |
| Democratic | Hector Arzeno | 6,477 | 46.90 |
| Total votes | | 13,809 | 100.00 |
| Republican hold | | | |

=== 2020 special ===
2020 Connecticut House of Representatives special elections, District 151
| Party | Candidate | Votes | % |
|---|---|---|---|
| Republican | Harry Arora | 2,345 | 54.4 |
| Democratic | Cheryl Moss | 1,965 | 45.6 |
| Total votes | | 4,310 | 100.00 |
| Republican hold | | | |

=== 2018 ===
2018 Connecticut House of Representatives election, District 151
| Party | Candidate | Votes | % |
|---|---|---|---|
| Republican | Fred Camillo (Incumbent) | 6,145 | 56.2 |
| Democratic | Laura Kostin | 4,786 | 43.8 |
| Total votes | | 10,931 | 100.00 |
| Republican hold | | | |

=== 2016 ===
2016 Connecticut House of Representatives election, District 151
| Party | Candidate | Votes | % |
|---|---|---|---|
| Republican | Fred Camillo (Incumbent) | 7,321 | 60.34 |
| Democratic | Dita Bhargava | 4,812 | 39.66 |
| Total votes | | 12,133 | 100.00 |
| Republican hold | | | |

=== 2014 ===
2014 Connecticut House of Representatives election, District 151
| Party | Candidate | Votes | % |
|---|---|---|---|
| Republican | Fred Camillo (Incumbent) | 5,909 | 100.00 |
| Total votes | | 5,909 | 100.00 |
| Republican hold | | | |

=== 2012 ===
2012 Connecticut House of Representatives election, District 151
| Party | Candidate | Votes | % |
|---|---|---|---|
| Republican | Fred Camillo (Incumbent) | 7,313 | 66.1 |
| Democratic | David A. Rafferty | 3,749 | 33.9 |
| Total votes | | 11,062 | 100.00 |
| Republican hold | | | |
