= 2018 United States House of Representatives elections in Connecticut =

- November 6, 2018

All 5 Connecticut seats to the United States House of Representatives
- Turnout: 60.24%
	Majority party	Minority party
Party	Democratic	Republican
Last election	5	0
Seats won	5	0
Seat change	Steady	Steady
Popular vote	849,341	520,521
Percentage	61.64%	37.78%
Swing	▼0.84%	▲1.71%

Democratic
40–50%
50–60%
60–70%
70–80%
80–90%
90–100%
Republican
40–50%
50–60%
60–70%

The 2018 United States House of Representatives elections in Connecticut were held on Tuesday, November 6, 2018, to elect the five U.S. representatives from the state of Connecticut, one from each of the state's five congressional districts. The elections coincided with the gubernatorial election, as well as other elections to the House of Representatives, elections to the United States Senate, and various state and local elections.

== Overview ==
The table below shows the total number and percentage of votes, as well as the number of seats won by each political party in the election for the United States House of Representatives in Connecticut.

United States House of Representatives elections in Connecticut, 2018
Party	Votes	Percentage	Seats
Democratic	808,652	58.61%	5
Republican	512,495	37.14%	0
Working Families Party	40,689	2.95%	0
Independent Party of Connecticut	8,026	0.58%	0
Green Party	6,624	0.48%	0
Libertarian	3,305	0.24%	0
Others	17	< 0.01%	0
Total	1,379,808	100.00%	5

- The Democratic candidates in the First, Second, Third and Fifth Districts were cross-endorsed by the Connecticut Working Families Party
- The Republican candidates in the Fourth and Fifth Districts were cross-endorsed by the Independent Party of Connecticut

=== By district ===
Results of the 2018 United States House of Representatives elections in Connecticut by district:

District	Democratic		Republican		Others†		Total		Result
District	Votes	%	Votes	%	Votes	%	Votes	%	Result
District 1	166,155*	63.87%	96,024	35.03%	3,029	1.10%	274,140	100.00%	Democratic hold
District 2	179,731*	62.17%	102,483	35.45%	6,900	2.39%	289,114	100.00%	Democratic hold
District 3	174,572*	64.60%	95,667	35.40%	0	N/A	270,239	100.00%	Democratic hold
District 4	168,726	61.21%	106,921*	38.79%	4	<0.00%	275,651	100.00%	Democratic hold
District 5	151,225*	55.87%	119,426*	44.12%	13	<0.00%	270,664	100.00%	Democratic hold
Total	849,341*	61.56%	520,521*	37.72%	9,946	0.72%	1,379,808	100.00%	

- * Includes vote counts for major party candidates on other party lines
- † Does not include fusion vote counts -- see individual districts for details

== District 1 ==
2018 Connecticut's 1st congressional district election
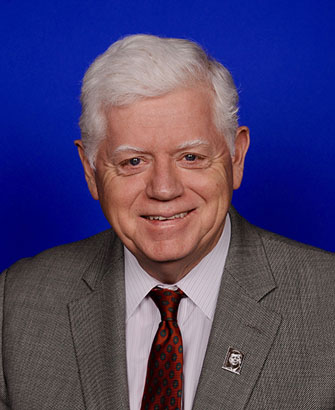

Nominee	John B. Larson	Jennifer Nye
Party	Democratic	Republican
Alliance	Working Families
Popular vote	175,087	96,024
Percentage	63.9%	35.0%
- Municipality results Larson: 50–60% 60–70% 70–80% 80–90% >90% Nye: 40–50% 50–60% 60–70%
U.S. Representative before election
John B. Larson
Democratic
Elected U.S. Representative
John B. Larson
Democratic

The 1st district is located in the north-central part of the state, and is anchored by the state capital of Hartford. It includes parts of Hartford, Litchfield, and Middlesex counties. The incumbent was Democrat John Larson, who had represented the district since 1999. He was re-elected to a tenth term with 64% of the vote in 2016.

=== Democratic primary ===
- John Larson, incumbent

=== Republican primary ===
- Jennifer Nye

=== General election ===
==== Predictions ====
Source	Ranking	As of
The Cook Political Report	Safe D	November 5, 2018
Inside Elections	Safe D	November 5, 2018
Sabato's Crystal Ball	Safe D	November 5, 2018
RCP	Safe D	November 5, 2018
Daily Kos	Safe D	November 5, 2018
538	Safe D	November 7, 2018
CNN	Safe D	October 31, 2018
Politico	Safe D	November 2, 2018

==== Results ====
Connecticut's 1st congressional district results, 2018
Party	Candidate	Votes	%
Democratic	John Larson	166,155	60.61%
Working Families	John Larson	8,932	3.26%
Total	John Larson (incumbent)	175,087	63.87%
Republican	Jennifer Nye	96,024	35.03%
Green	Tom McCormick	3,029	1.10%
Total votes		274,140	100%
Democratic hold			

== District 2 ==
2018 Connecticut's 2nd congressional district election
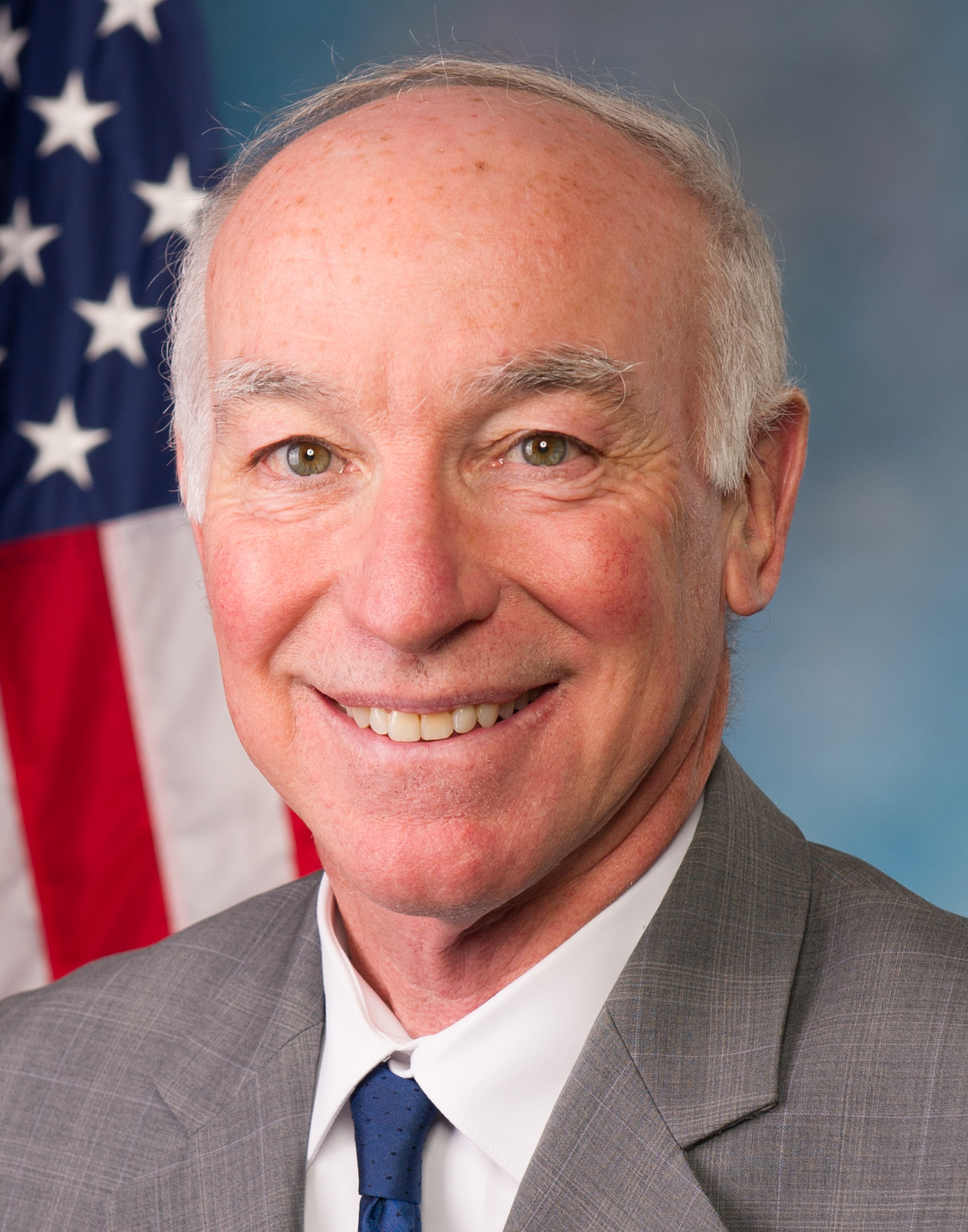

Nominee	Joe Courtney	Dan Postemski
Party	Democratic	Republican
Alliance	Working Families
Popular vote	179,731	102,483
Percentage	62.2%	35.5%
- Municipality results Courtney: 40–50% 50–60% 60–70% 70–80% 80–90% >90% Postemski: 40–50%
U.S. Representative before election
Joe Courtney
Democratic
Elected U.S. Representative
Joe Courtney
Democratic

The 2nd district is located in the eastern part of the state, and includes all of New London, Tolland, and Windham counties and parts of Hartford, Middlesex, and New Haven counties. The incumbent was Democrat Joe Courtney, who had represented the district since 2007. He was re-elected to a sixth term with 63% of the vote in 2016. The National Republican Congressional Committee outlined this district as one of the 36 Democratic-held districts it was targeting in 2018. Republican gubernatorial nominee Bob Stefanowski won the district in the concurrent gubernatorial election.

=== Democratic primary ===
- Joe Courtney, incumbent

=== Republican primary ===
- Dan Postemski, veteran and chairman of the Hampton Republican Town Committee

=== General election ===
==== Endorsements ====
Dan Reale (L)

Individuals

- Michael P. Meadows, former Republican candidate for Connecticut House of Representatives district 47, Republican State Central Committee Representative district 19, Sprague Republican Town Committee chairman, Sprague Board of Finance member

==== Predictions ====
Source	Ranking	As of
The Cook Political Report	Safe D	November 5, 2018
Inside Elections	Safe D	November 5, 2018
Sabato's Crystal Ball	Safe D	November 5, 2018
RCP	Safe D	November 5, 2018
Daily Kos	Safe D	November 5, 2018
538	Safe D	November 7, 2018
CNN	Safe D	October 31, 2018
Politico	Safe D	November 2, 2018

Connecticut's 2nd congressional district results, 2018
Party	Candidate	Votes	%
Democratic	Joe Courtney	167,659	57.99%
Working Families	Joe Courtney	12,072	4.18%
Total	Joe Courtney (incumbent)	179,731	62.17%
Republican	Dan Postemski	102,483	35.45%
Green	Michelle Louise Bicking	3,595	1.24%
Libertarian	Dan Reale	3,305	1.14%
Total votes		289,114	100%
Democratic hold			

== District 3 ==
2018 Connecticut's 3rd congressional district election
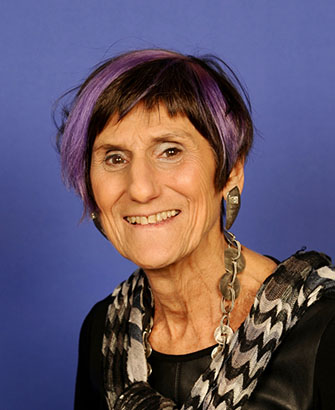

Nominee	Rosa DeLauro	Angel Cadena
Party	Democratic	Republican
Alliance	Working Families
Popular vote	174,572	95,667
Percentage	64.6%	35.4%
- Municipality results DeLauro: 50–60% 60–70% 70–80% >90% Cadena: 50–60%
U.S. Representative before election
Rosa DeLauro
Democratic
Elected U.S. Representative
Rosa DeLauro
Democratic

The 3rd district is located in the central part of the state and contains the city of New Haven and its surrounding suburbs. It includes parts of Fairfield, Middlesex, and New Haven counties. The incumbent was Democrat Rosa DeLauro, who had represented the district since 1991. She was re-elected to a fourteenth term with 69% of the vote in 2016.

=== Democratic primary ===
- Rosa DeLauro, incumbent

=== Republican primary ===
- Angel Cadena, Marine veteran and Republican nominee for CT-3 in 2016

=== General election ===
==== Predictions ====
Source	Ranking	As of
The Cook Political Report	Safe D	November 5, 2018
Inside Elections	Safe D	November 5, 2018
Sabato's Crystal Ball	Safe D	November 5, 2018
RCP	Safe D	November 5, 2018
Daily Kos	Safe D	November 5, 2018
538	Safe D	November 7, 2018
CNN	Safe D	October 31, 2018
Politico	Safe D	November 2, 2018

==== Results ====
Connecticut's 3rd congressional district results, 2018
Party	Candidate	Votes	%
Democratic	Rosa DeLauro	163,211	60.40%
Working Families	Rosa DeLauro	11,361	4.20%
Total	Rosa DeLauro (incumbent)	174,572	64.60%
Republican	Angel Cadena	95,667	35.40%
Total votes		270,239	100%
Democratic hold			

== District 4 ==
2018 Connecticut's 4th congressional district election
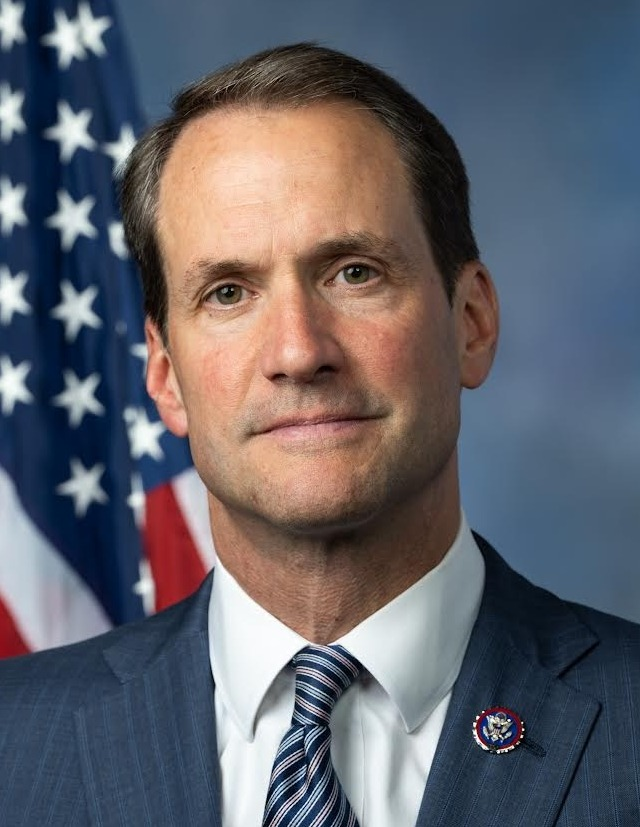

Nominee	Jim Himes	Harry Arora
Party	Democratic	Republican
Alliance		Independent Party
Popular vote	168,726	106,921
Percentage	61.2%	38.8%
- Municipality results Himes: 50–60% 60–70% 80–90% Arora: 50–60% 60–70%
U.S. Representative before election
Jim Himes
Democratic
Elected U.S. Representative
Jim Himes
Democratic

The 4th district is located in the southwestern part of the state, extending from Bridgeport, the largest city in the state, to Greenwich. It includes parts of Fairfield and New Haven counties. The incumbent was Democrat Jim Himes, who had represented the district since 2009. He was re-elected to a fifth term with 60% of the vote in 2016.

=== Democratic primary ===
- Jim Himes, incumbent

=== Republican primary ===
- Harry Arora, investment firm founder

=== General election ===
==== Predictions ====
Source	Ranking	As of
The Cook Political Report	Safe D	November 5, 2018
Inside Elections	Safe D	November 5, 2018
Sabato's Crystal Ball	Safe D	November 5, 2018
RCP	Safe D	November 5, 2018
Daily Kos	Safe D	November 5, 2018
538	Safe D	November 7, 2018
CNN	Safe D	October 31, 2018
Politico	Safe D	November 2, 2018

==== Results ====
Connecticut's 4th congressional district results, 2018
Party	Candidate	Votes	%
Democratic	Jim Himes (incumbent)	168,726	61.21%
Republican	Harry Arora	103,175	37.43%
Independent Party	Harry Arora	3,746	1.36%
Total	Harry Arora	106,921	38.79%
Write-in		4	<0.01%
Total votes		275,651	100%
Democratic hold			

== District 5 ==
2018 Connecticut's 5th congressional district election
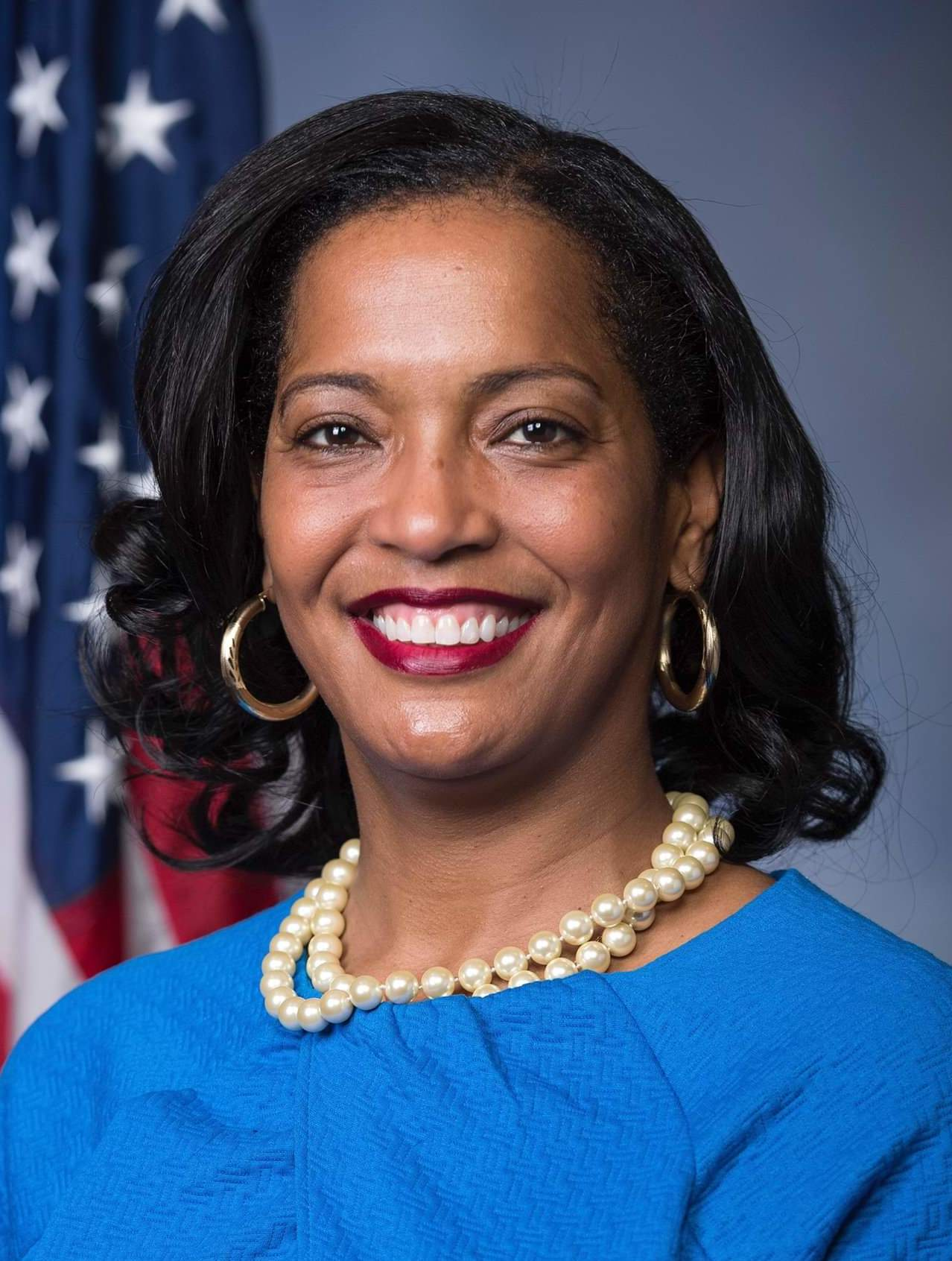

Nominee	Jahana Hayes	Manny Santos
Party	Democratic	Republican
Alliance	Working Families	Independent Party
Popular vote	151,225	119,426
Percentage	55.9%	44.1%
- Municipality results Hayes: 50–60% 60–70% 70–80% Santos: 50–60% 60–70%
U.S. Representative before election
Elizabeth Esty
Democratic
Elected U.S. Representative
Jahana Hayes
Democratic

The 5th district is located in the northwestern part of the state and includes parts of Fairfield, Hartford, Litchfield, and New Haven counties. The incumbent was Democrat Elizabeth Esty, who represented the district since 2013. She was re-elected to a third term with 58% of the vote in 2016. Esty did not run for reelection in 2018. Republican gubernatorial nominee Bob Stefanowski won the district in the concurrent gubernatorial election.

=== Democratic primary ===
Declared

- Mary Glassman, former First Selectman of Simsbury, and candidate for lieutenant governor in 2006 and 2010
- Jahana Hayes, 2016 National Teacher of the Year

Declined

- Elizabeth Esty, incumbent congresswoman

Debate

2018 Connecticut's 5th congressional district Democratic primary debate
No.	Date	Host	Moderator	Link	Democratic	Democratic
Key: P Participant A Absent N Not invited I Invited W Withdrawn						
Key: P Participant A Absent N Not invited I Invited W Withdrawn					Mary Glassman	Jahana Hayes
1	Jul. 29, 2018	Newton Democratic; Town Committee		YouTube	P	P

==== Primary results ====
Democratic primary results, Connecticut 2018
Party	Candidate	Votes	%
Democratic	Jahana Hayes	24,693	62.27%
Democratic	Mary Glassman	14,964	37.73%
Total votes		39,657	100%

=== Republican primary ===
Declared

- Rich DuPont, businessman
- Ruby Corby O’Neill, retired psychology professor and political activist
- Manny Santos, former mayor of Meriden

==== Primary results ====
Republican primary results, Connecticut 2018
Party	Candidate	Votes	%
Republican	Manny Santos	16,816	52.39%
Republican	Ruby Corby O’Neill	8,419	26.23%
Republican	Rich DuPont	6,863	21.38%
Total votes		32,098	100%

=== General election ===
==== Predictions ====
Source	Ranking	As of
The Cook Political Report	Safe D	November 5, 2018
Inside Elections	Safe D	November 5, 2018
Sabato's Crystal Ball	Safe D	November 5, 2018
RCP	Safe D	November 5, 2018
Daily Kos	Safe D	November 5, 2018
538	Safe D	November 7, 2018
CNN	Safe D	October 31, 2018
Politico	Safe D	November 2, 2018

==== Results ====
Connecticut's 5th congressional district results, 2018
Party	Candidate	Votes	%
Democratic	Jahana Hayes	142,901	52.80%
Working Families	Jahana Hayes	8,324	3.07%
Total	Jahana Hayes	151,225	55.87%
Republican	Manny Santos	115,146	42.54%
Independent Party	Manny Santos	4,280	1.58%
Total	Manny Santos	119,426	44.12%
Write-in		13	0.01%
Total votes		270,664	100%
Democratic hold			

== See also ==
- 2018 United States House of Representatives elections
- 2018 United States elections
