= Thomas Powers (disambiguation) =

Thomas Powers is an author.

Thomas Powers may also refer to:

- Thomas E. Powers (1808–1876), Vermont doctor, newspaper editor and politician
- Thomas J. Powers, American politician in Monmouth County, New Jersey
- Thomas W. Powers, American Catholic priest
- Thomas Powers (1846–1888), American Medal of Honor recipient

== See also ==
- Tom Powers (disambiguation)
- Thomas Power (disambiguation)
