= Powers House =

Powers House may refer to:

in Canada

- Patrick J. Powers House, 178 James Street, Ottawa, built in 1915, designed by Francis Conroy Sullivan

in the United States

(by state then city or town)

- Powers House, in Alvarado Terrace Historic District, Los Angeles, California
- Leithoff-Powers Ranch Historic District, Junction City, Kansas, listed on the NRHP in Geary County, Kansas
- David W. Powers House, Leavenworth, Kansas, listed on the NRHP in Leavenworth County, Kansas
- Peter Powers House, Deer Isle, Maine
- Powers House (Sidney, Maine), listed on the NRHP in Hancock County, Maine
- Powers Institute Historic District, Bernardston, Massachusetts, NRHP-listed
- Edward L. Powers House, Minneapolis, Minnesota, a house designed by Purcell & Elmslie who designed E.S. Hoyt House
- Alvis Powers House, Grandin, Missouri, listed on the NRHP in Carter County, Missouri
- Windswept Acres-Powers House, Goshen, New Hampshire, NRHP-listed
- Powers Home, Troy, New York, NRHP-listed
- Isaac M. Powers House, Wallace, North Carolina, listed on the NRHP in Duplin County, North Carolina
- Elliot-Powers House and Garage, Fargo, North Dakota, NRHP-eligible
- Strange Powers House, Prairie du Chien, Wisconsin, NRHP-listed

== See also ==
- Powers Hotel (disambiguation)
- Powers Building, Rochester, New York, NRHP-listed
- Ira F. Powers Building, Portland, Oregon, listed on the NRHP in Southwest Portland, Oregon
- Thomas Powers School
