= Richard Powers (disambiguation) =

Richard Powers (born 1957) is an American novelist.

Rick, Ricky, Richie or Richard Powers may also refer to:

- Richard Powers (actor) (1896–1963), American character performer a/k/a George Duryea, Tom Keene and Dick Powers
- Richard Powers (unionist) (1844–1929), Irish-born American labor union leader
- Richard M. Powers (1921–1996), American science fiction illustrator
- Richie Powers (1930–1998), American basketball referee
- Richard Gid Powers (born 1944), American historian; 2004 president of Historians of American Communism
- Richard Powers (dance historian) (born 1948), American choreographer and academic
- Ricky Powers (born 1970), American football player
- Rick Powers (born 1995), ring name of American professional wrestler a/k/a Velveteen Dream

== See also ==
- Richard Power (disambiguation)
