= Harry Arora =

American politician

Member of the Connecticut House of Representatives from the 151st district
- In office February 5, 2020 – January 4, 2023
- Preceded by: Fred Camillo
- Succeeded by: Hector Arzeno

Personal details
- Born: December 16, 1969 (age 56) New Delhi, India
- Party: Republican
- Spouse: Nisha Arora
- Children: 3
- Education: Delhi Technological University (BEng); University of Texas, Austin (MBA); Harvard University (MPA)
- Website: Campaign website

Harry Arora (born December 16, 1969) is an American politician who served as a member of the Connecticut House of Representatives from the 151st District, serving from 2020 to 2023. In 2018, Arora ran against incumbent Jim Himes in the race for Connecticut's Fourth District in the United States House of Representatives. He was the Republican nominee for Connecticut State Treasurer in the 2022 election.

== Early life and education ==
Arora was born December 16, 1969, in New Delhi, India. He completed his Bachelor of Engineering at Delhi College of Engineering. He came to Austin, Texas, to complete a Master of Business Administration in Finance in 1992. Arora has also completed a Master of Public Administration at the Harvard Kennedy School. He became a naturalized U.S. citizen in 2004. He is of Punjabi descent.

== Professional career ==
Arora has been a partner in London-based commodity trading firm Northlander Commodity Advisors, LLP which specializes in energy trading. In 2006, he started his own fund in Greenwich, named ARCIM Advisors (which now is called Alphastrat, LLC). He is an independent investment manager with a 25-year track record in finance.

== Political career ==
=== 2018 United States House of Representatives election ===
In 2018, Arora challenged incumbent U.S. Representative Jim Himes for Connecticut's Fourth District seat in the United States House of Representatives. Arora would later lose the election by nearly 23 points.

=== Connecticut House of Representatives ===
Arora was first elected to the House in a special election on January 21, 2020. Arora was re-elected in that November's general election against Democrat Hector Arzeno. He served on the Labor & Public Employees, Energy & Technology, and Human Services committees.

=== 2021 State Elections Enforcement Commission investigation ===
On March 3, 2021, the Connecticut State Elections Enforcement Commission launched an investigation against Arora for campaign finance violations. On April 12, 2022, Arora's campaign was ordered to pay a fine of $800.

=== 2022 Connecticut State Treasurer election ===
On April 13, 2022, Arora announced that he was running for Connecticut State Treasurer, and on May 6, 2022, was chosen as the Republican nominee for the State Treasurer election. He lost the general election to Erick Russell.

== Personal life ==
Arora is married to Nisha Arora (b. 1977), who is currently serving as a member of the Greenwich Board of Estimate and Taxation (BET), also for the Republican Party. They have three children and reside in the Midcountry section of Greenwich, Connecticut.

Arora has advocated for and supported local Greenwich initiatives such as the Greenwich YWCA, the Boys & Girls Clubs of Greenwich, and Kids in Crisis.

Party political offices
Preceded by Thad Gray	Republican nominee for Treasurer of Connecticut; 2022	Most recent
