= Fred Camillo =

American politician

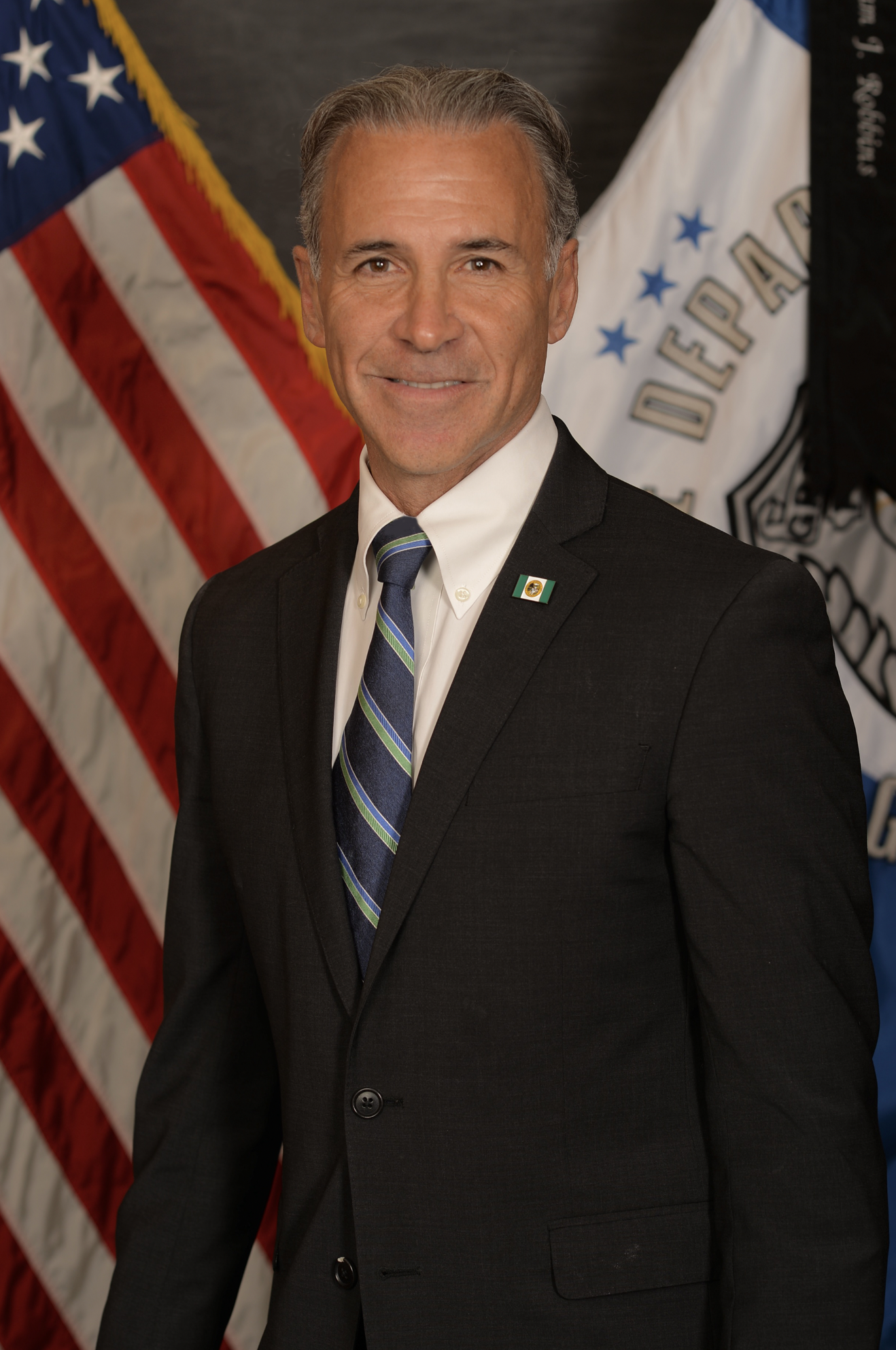

First Selectman of Greenwich, Connecticut
- Incumbent
- Assumed office December 1, 2019
- Preceded by: Peter Tesei

Member of the Connecticut House of Representatives from the 151st district
- In office January 7, 2009 – December 2, 2019
- Preceded by: Claudia Powers
- Succeeded by: Harry Arora

Personal details
- Born: Alfred Francis Camillo, Jr. June 3, 1962 (age 64) Greenwich, Connecticut, U.S.
- Party: Republican
- Education: Greenwich High School
- Alma mater: Manhattanville College (BS, MS)
- Website: https://www.fredforfirst.com/

Alfred Francis Camillo, Jr. known as Fred Camillo (born June 3, 1962) is an American politician who has served as the First Selectman of Greenwich, Connecticut, since 2019. He previously served in the Connecticut House of Representatives from the 151st district from 2009 to 2019.

== Early life and education ==
Camillo was born June 3, 1962, in Greenwich, Connecticut, to Alfred Al Camillo, Sr. and Marie Albano Prizio. with both paternal and maternal families emigrating from Calabria, Naples, and Sicily in the southern part of Italy at the turn of the 20th Century. He grew in the Cos Cob section of Greenwich, Connecticut. Initially, he did not complete a tertiary education and after graduating from Greenwich High School began to operate a recycling company as a small business owner. He received his Bachelor's and Master's degrees from Manhattanville College later in life. He is a relative of Italian-American politicians Albert P. Morano and Michael L. Morano.

== Career ==
Since Camillo initially didn't pursue a college education, he was primarily active as a small business owner operating a recycling company in Greenwich between 1984 and 2011 which was last known as Greenwich Recycling Company. He has also worked as a high school teacher, baseball coach and real estate professional. Camillo served on the boards of the Greenwich Council of Boy Scouts, Greenwich Baseball Foundation, Greenwich Junior Babe Ruth League, the Greenwich Old Timers Athletic Association, the Cos Cob Association and Adopt-a-Dog.

== Political career ==
Camillo was elected in the Connecticut House of Representatives, assuming office on January 7, 2009, succeeding incumbent Claudia Powers (R). He was a member of the Commerce, Higher Education and Employment Advancement, and Public Safety and Security Committees of the Connecticut House. He also served as an Assistant Minority Leader of the Connecticut House. He resigned from his position December 2, 2019.

On November 5, 2019, Camillo won the race for First Selectman of Greenwich against opponent Jill Oberlander with 57.36% of the vote against Oberlander's 42.64%. On November 2, 2021, Camillo won re-election over Democrat William Kelly with 11,138 votes, or just over 67% of the vote. In 2022, Camillo called for repealing a law that allowed for the construction of dense housing in localities if localities cannot demonstrate that the housing would adversely affect health, safety, and environment. He argued that municipalities should maintain local control when it comes to decisions to address the issue of housing instead of having it come through state mandates.

Camillo was re-elected to a third term in 2023, defeating challenger Laura Erickson with 60% of the vote.

== Personal life ==
Camillo resides in Old Greenwich, Connecticut with his beloved German Shepherds and Maltese.

== Electoral history ==
=== 2023 ===
Greenwich First Selectman general election, 2023
| Party | Candidate | Votes | % |
|---|---|---|---|
| Republican | Fred Camillo (incumbent) | 11,620 | 59.61% |
| Democratic | Laura Erickson | 7,876 | 40.39% |
| Total votes | | 19,496 | 100.00% |
| Republican hold | | | |

=== 2021 ===
Greenwich First Selectman general election, 2021
| Party | Candidate | Votes | % |
|---|---|---|---|
| Republican | Fred Camillo (incumbent) | 11,138 | 67.10% |
| Democratic | William Kelly | 5,460 | 32.90% |
| Total votes | | 16,598 | 100.00% |
| Republican hold | | | |

=== 2019 ===
Greenwich First Selectman general election, 2019
| Party | Candidate | Votes | % |
|---|---|---|---|
| Republican | Fred Camillo | 10,045 | 57.37% |
| Democratic | Jill Oberlander | 7,466 | 42.63% |
| Total votes | | 17,511 | 100.00% |
| Republican hold | | | |

=== 2018 ===
Connecticut's 151st House of Representatives district election, 2018
| Party | Candidate | Votes | % |
|---|---|---|---|
| Republican | Fred Camillo | 5,918 | 54.13% |
| Independent Party | Fred Camillo | 227 | 2.08% |
| Total | Fred Camillo (incumbent) | 6,145 | 56.21% |
| Democratic | Laura Kostin | 4,786 | 43.79% |
| Total votes | | 10,931 | 100.00% |
| Republican hold | | | |

=== 2016 ===
Connecticut's 151st House of Representatives district election, 2016
| Party | Candidate | Votes | % |
|---|---|---|---|
| Republican | Fred Camillo (incumbent) | 7,321 | 60.34% |
| Democratic | Dita Bhargava | 4,812 | 39.66% |
| Total votes | | 12,133 | 100.00% |
| Republican hold | | | |

=== 2014 ===
Connecticut's 151st House of Representatives district election, 2014
| Party | Candidate | Votes | % |
|---|---|---|---|
| Republican | Fred Camillo (incumbent) | 5,909 | 100.00% |
| Total votes | | 5,909 | 100.00% |
| Republican hold | | | |

=== 2012 ===
Connecticut's 151st House of Representatives district election, 2012
| Party | Candidate | Votes | % |
|---|---|---|---|
| Republican | Fred Camillo (incumbent) | 7,313 | 66.11% |
| Democratic | David A. Rafferty | 3,749 | 33.89% |
| Total votes | | 11,062 | 100.00% |
| Republican hold | | | |

=== 2010 ===
Connecticut's 151st House of Representatives district election, 2010
| Party | Candidate | Votes | % |
|---|---|---|---|
| Republican | Fred Camillo (incumbent) | 5,342 | 64.21% |
| Democratic | Claude Johnson | 2,977 | 35.79% |
| Total votes | | 8,319 | 100.00% |
| Republican hold | | | |

=== 2008 ===
Connecticut's 151st House of Representatives district election, 2008
| Party | Candidate | Votes | % |
|---|---|---|---|
| Republican | Fred Camillo | 5,932 | 55.36% |
| Democratic | Edward Krumeich | 4,784 | 44.64% |
| Total votes | | 10,716 | 100.00% |
| Republican hold | | | |
