= Hector Arzeno =

Argentine-born American businessman, banker and politician

Member of the Connecticut House of Representatives from the 151st district
- Incumbent
- Assumed office January 4, 2023
- Preceded by: Harry Arora
- Constituency: Represented Greenwich

Personal details
- Born: Héctor Eduardo Arzeno; September 30, 1947 (age 78) Buenos Aires, Argentina
- Party: Democratic
- Spouse: Paula Arzeno
- Education: Pontifical Catholic University of Argentina (Licentiate); University of Pennsylvania (AMP)

Hector Edward Arzeno (born September 30, 1947) is an Argentine-born American businessman, banker, and politician.

Since January 4, 2023, he serves as a Democratic Party member of the Connecticut House of Representatives for the 151st district, which encompasses parts of Greenwich.

== Early life and education ==
Arzeno was born September 30, 1947, in Buenos Aires, Argentina. From 1967 to 1973, he studied business administration at the Pontifical Catholic University of Argentina, graduating with a licentiate degree which would be an equivalent of a master's degree. In 1974, aged 27, he came to the United States for a trainee program at Morgan Guaranty Trust (today a part of JP Morgan Chase). He also completed an Advanced Management Program (AMP) at the Wharton School at the University of Pennsylvania in 1990. He settled in Greenwich, Connecticut, in 1986, becoming a naturalized U.S. citizen in 1987.

== Early career ==
In 1987, he was deployed into an executive banking position at Banesto in Madrid, Spain, where he was responsible for corporate and international banking. He moved back to the United States in 1990 becoming the general manager of the New York City branch of Banco Galicia, a position he continued to hold until 1997. Between 1997 and 2005, he moved back to Buenos Aires for an executive vice president position at Banco Galicia. In 2005, he co-founded Fenix Bursatil S.A., a finance holding based in Buenos Aires, Argentina. Since 2012, he has been active as independent financial advisor. He served as a volunteer coach for the Greenwich Youth Soccer League, member of the parent board of Bucknell University, member of the sustainability board of Greenwich Country Day School, a Greenwich High School tour guide and science department helper as well as a volunteer for the Town of Greenwich Conservation Department.

== Greenwich RTM ==
Since 2019, Arzeno served on the Representative Town Meeting (RTM) for District 8, serving as a delegate on the Finance Committee and alternate on the Claims Committee.

== Connecticut State House of Representatives ==
=== Elections ===
==== 2022 ====
In 2020, Arzeno ran for election to the Connecticut House of Representatives, but was defeated by Republican Harry Arora. He became member-elect in the 2022 election, defeating contrary Peter Sherr (CT-R), assuming office on January 4, 2023. He was the first town Democrat to assume the seat in history.

== Electoral history ==
2022 Connecticut State House of Representatives election, 151st District
Party	Candidate	Votes	%
Democratic	Hector Arzeno	5,574	53.50
Republican	Peter Sherr	4,845	46.50
Total votes		10,419	100.00
Democratic gain from Republican			

== Personal life ==
Arzeno is married to Paula (née Picco). They have five children between them, four daughters and a son. He resides in the Cos Cob section of Greenwich.

He is a dual citizen of the United States and Argentina.
