= Patrick Powers =

Patrick Powers may refer to:

- Patrick T. Powers (1860–1925), American baseball executive and manager
- Patrick Powers (volleyball) (born 1958), American former volleyball player
- Pat Powers (producer) (1870–1948), Irish-American businessman and film producer

== See also ==
- Patrick Power (disambiguation)
