= Jim Powers (disambiguation) =

Jim Powers (born 1958) is an American professional wrestler.

Jim Powers may also refer to:

- Jim Powers (American football) (1928–2013), American football quarterback, defensive back and linebacker who played for the San Francisco 49ers
- Jim Powers (baseball) (1868–?), Major League Baseball player who pitched for the 1890 Brooklyn Gladiators
- Jim Powers (ice hockey) (1936–2026), Canadian ice hockey player

== See also ==
- James Powers (disambiguation)
- James Power (disambiguation)
