= Richard Power =

Richard, Richie or Dick Power may refer to:

== Peers and politicians ==
- Richard Power, 1st Baron le Power and Coroghmore (c.1482–1539), Irish peer
- Richard Power, 4th Baron Power (c.1553–1607), Irish peer (Earl of Tyrone#Barons Power (13 September 1535))
- Richard Power, 1st Earl of Tyrone (1630–1690)
- Richard Power (of Clashmore) (c.1747–1814), Irish peer; MP for County Waterford
- Richard Shapland Power (c.1776–1831), Irish legislator; MP for County Waterford; his father was Richard Power of Clashmore
- Sir Richard Champion Power, 3rd Baronet (1843–1892), Irish peer, member of Power baronets
- Richard Power (Parnellite MP) (1851–1891), Irish nationalist politician, MP for Waterford City 1874–1891
- Richard Power (Monaghan politician) (c. 1732–1794), Irish politician, barrister and judge

== Others ==
- Dick Power (before 1903–after 1938), boxer
- Richie Power Snr (born 1957), Irish hurler
- Richie Power Jnr (born 1985), Irish hurler
- Richard Power (writer) (1928–1970), Irish writer
- Richard Power (cricketer) (1896–1978), Irish cricketer

== See also ==
- Richard Powers (disambiguation)
- Power (name)
