= Mike Powers =

Mike or Michael Powers may refer to:

- Mike Powers (baseball) (1906–1983), American right fielder in Major League Baseball
- Mike Powers (soccer) (born 1957), retired American soccer midfielder
- Michael Powers (blues musician) born 1952, American blues guitarist
- Michael Powers (jazz guitarist), Seattle-based guitarist in the jazz and blues genres
- Mike Powers (politician) (born 1962), American politician in Wisconsin
- Doc Powers (Michael Riley Powers, 1870–1909), American Major League Baseball player
- Michael R. Powers (born 1959), American professor of insurance and author
- Mike Powers, county executive officer in Ventura County, California
