= Claudia Powers =

American politician

Member of the Connecticut House of Representatives from the 151st district
- In office January 6, 1993 – January 7, 2009
- Preceded by: Lydia Stevens
- Succeeded by: Fred Camillo

Personal details
- Born: May 28, 1950 (age 76) Key West, Florida, U.S.
- Party: Republican

Claudia "Dolly" Powers (born May 28, 1950) is an American politician who served in the Connecticut House of Representatives from the 151st district between 1993 and 2009. Powers began her tenure in the Connecticut House of Representatives in 1993 from the Republican party, having beaten Democrat Elaine Markley Schuman with 65 percent of the vote for the 151st district in Greenwich. After that, she was re-elected seven times, leaving in January 2009 with the election of Republican Fred Camillo.

== Connecticut House of Representatives ==
=== Busing ===
In 1993, Powers was the only House legislator to vote against a measure that provided $2.6 million (equivalent to $5,800,000 in 2025) for public bus subsidies in Bridgeport and New Haven. Powers stated that she did not vote for the plan because it did not contain any funding for her home district in Greenwich; the Hartford Courant wrote that Greenwich was an "affluent community" along with other Connecticut cities that received no funding, such as New Canaan, Darien, and Westport.

=== Hospice care ===
In 2007, Powers proposed bills in the Connecticut House of Representatives that would have included hospice in the Connecticut's Medicare program, which were introduced after her father received hospice care. Powers commented to the Courant that "it made all the difference in my family"; she also stated that Connecticut state prison inmates have access to hospice care through a government program introduced in 2001.

== Later life ==
After leaving the Connecticut House of Representatives, Powers became a columnist for the Greenwich Time.

== Electoral history ==
Year	Office	Party	Candidate	Votes	%	%	Votes	Candidate	Party
1992	Connecticut's 151st House of Representatives district	Republican	Claudia Powers	6,918	65.0%	35.0%	3,727	Elaine Markley Schuman	Democratic
1994	Connecticut's 151st House of Representatives district	Republican	Claudia Powers	6,210	74.5%	26.5%	2,131	Elaine Markley Schuman	Democratic
1996	Connecticut's 151st House of Representatives district	Republican	Claudia Powers	7,146	72.0%	28.0%	2,779	Gwen M. Bylinsky	Democratic
1998	Connecticut's 151st House of Representatives district	Republican	Claudia Powers	5,323	100%	unopposed			
2000	Connecticut's 151st House of Representatives district	Republican	Claudia Powers	7,328	100%	unopposed			
2002	Connecticut's 151st House of Representatives district	Republican	Claudia Powers	4,792	100%	unopposed			
2004	Connecticut's 151st House of Representatives district	Republican	Claudia Powers	6,885	100%	unopposed			
2006	Connecticut's 151st House of Representatives district	Republican	Claudia Powers	3,883	50.8%	49.2%	3,751	Edward T. Krumeich	Democratic
