= Michael Power =

Michael Power may refer to:

== People ==
- Michael Power (athlete) (born 1976), Australian former long-distance runner
- Michael Power (Australian politician) (died 1880), Australian politician
- Michael Power (bishop) (1804–1847), Canadian bishop
- Michael Joseph Power (1834–1895), businessman and political figure in Nova Scotia, Canada
- Michael Power (accountant) (born 1957), professor of accounting

== Other uses ==
- Michael Power (character), an advertising character for Guinness
- Michael Power - St. Joseph High School, a secondary school in Toronto, Canada
