= Charles Power =

Charles Power or Charles Powers may refer to:

- Charles Gavan Power (1888–1968), Canadian politician and ice hockey player
- Charles Power (field hockey) (1878–1953), Irish field hockey player
- Charles W. Power, American politician; mayor of Pittsfield, Massachusetts
- Sir Charles Powers (1853–1939), Australian politician.
- Charles T. Powers (1943–1996), American journalist and writer
- Charlie Power (politician) (born 1948), Canadian politician
- Charlie Power (Canadian football) (born 1991), Canadian football running back
