= Tyrone Power (disambiguation) =

Tyrone Power (1914–1958) was an American actor.

Tyrone Power may also refer to:

- Tyrone Power (Irish actor) (1797–1841)
- Tyrone Power Sr. (1869–1931), British-born actor
- Tyrone Power Jr. (born 1959), actor
- Sir W. Tyrone Power (1819–1911), Australian artist and author
