= Andrea Colli =

Italian academic

- Born: 15 June 1966 (age 60)
- Education: Bocconi University
- Occupation: Business historian
- Employer: Bocconi University

Andrea Colli (born 15 June 1966) is an Italian academic. He is a professor of Business History, Head of Department of Social and Political sciences at Bocconi University. He is the author of several books.

== Early life ==
Andrea Colli was born 15 June 1966. He graduated from Bocconi University, where he also earned a PhD in Economic and Social History.

== Career ==
Colli is a professor of Business History, Head of Department of Social and Political sciences at his alma mater, Bocconi University. He was a visiting professor at the Lancaster University Management School.

== Works ==
- Colli, Andrea (2003). The History of Family Business 1850–2000. Cambridge, U.K.: Cambridge University Press. ISBN 9780521800280. OCLC 491524940.
- Colli, Andrea; Vasta, Michelangelo, eds. (2010). Forms of Enterprise in 20th Century Italy: Boundaries, Structures and Strategies. Cheltenham, U.K.: Elgar. ISBN 9781847203830. OCLC 836942164.
- Amatori, Franco; Colli, Andrea (2011). Business History: Complexities and Comparisons. New York: Routledge. ISBN 9780415423977. OCLC 774401538.
- Colli, Andrea; De Jong, Abe; Iversen, Martin Jes (2013). Mapping European Corporations. Strategy, Structure, Ownership and Performance. Hoboken, New Jersey: Taylor & Francis. ISBN 9781135754440. OCLC 864414353.
- Colli, Andrea; Fernández Pérez, Paloma, eds. (2014). The Endurance of Family Businesses: A Global Overview. New York: Cambridge University Press. ISBN 9781107037755. OCLC 908063432.
