= Patrick Power =

Patrick, Paddy or Pat Power may refer to:

- Patrick Power (Canadian politician) (1815–1881), Canadian politician
- Patrick Power (Liberal politician) (died 1835), MP for Waterford
- Patrick Power (lawyer) (born 1952), Australian legal official convicted of possessing child pornography
- Patrick Power (tenor) (born 1947), New Zealand tenor
- Patrick Power (historian) (1862–1951), Irish church historian
- Patrick Power (East Waterford MP) (1850–1913), Irish politician
- Paddy Power, an Irish bookmaking chain
- Paddy Power (Irish politician) (1928–2013), Fianna Fáil politician
- Paddy Power (hurler) (1895–1967), Tipperary hurler
- Pat Power (1942–2025), Australian Roman Catholic bishop
- Pat Power (Victorian politician) (1942–2009), Australian politician
- Pat Power (hurler) (born 1959), Irish hurler

== See also ==
- Patrick Powers (disambiguation)
