= Powers Hotel =

Powers Hotel may refer to:

Alphabetical by state

- Powers Hotel (Rochester, New York), adjacent to the Powers Building, listed on the U.S. National Register of Historic Places (NRHP)
- Powers Hotel (Fargo, North Dakota), NRHP-listed
- Powers Hotel (Powers, Oregon), formerly NRHP-listed in Coos County

== See also ==
- Powers House (disambiguation)
