= Victor Power =

Victor Power or Vic Power may refer to:

- Victor O'Donovan Power (1860–1933), Irish playwright, novelist and short-story writer
- Vic Power (1927–2005), Puerto Rican Major League Baseball player
- Victor M. Power (1934–2024), Canadian politician and three-time mayor of Timmins, Ontario
