= Justice Powers =

Justice Powers may refer to:

- Frederick A. Powers (1855–1923), associate justice of the Maine Supreme Judicial Court
- George M. Powers (1861–1938), associate justice of the Vermont Supreme Court
- H. Henry Powers (1835–1913), associate justice of the Vermont Supreme Court
- Orlando W. Powers (1851–1914), associate justice of the Utah Supreme Court
- William E. Powers (1907–1989), associate justice of the Rhode Island Supreme Court
- Justice Powers (American football) (born 1996), American football offensive tackle
