= David Power =

David or Dave Power may refer to:

- David Power (tennis) (1944–2022), American tennis player
- David Power (bookmaker) (1947–2024), Irish bookmaker and businessman
- David Power (Gaelic footballer) (born 1983)
- Dave Power (runner) (1928–2014), Australian long-distance runner
- Dave Power (soccer) (born 1954), English-born, American soccer player
- Dave Power, actor in U-571

== See also ==
- David Davin-Power (born 1952), Irish journalist
