= Thomas Power (Newfoundland politician) =

Canadian politician

Thomas Joseph Power (December 12, 1886 – 1959) was a merchant and politician in Newfoundland. He represented St. George's in the Newfoundland House of Assembly from 1924 to 1928.

The son of Michael Power and Margaret Kelly, he was born in St. John's and was educated there. Power worked as a cooper in the family cooperage and then, in 1914, set up a herring packing business and barrel factory at Woods Island, Bay of Islands. He was elected to the Newfoundland assembly in 1924 as a Liberal-Conservative. In 1925, he was named government representative on the board of directors for the Newfoundland Power and Paper Company in Corner Brook. He was defeated when he ran for reelection in 1928. He later managed an insurance agency in St. John's.

In 1927, Power married Maude Aylward.
