= Catherine Power (disambiguation) =

Catherine Power, or variants, may refer to:

- Catherine Power (born 1985), Canadian wrestler
- Catharine Power (died 1769), Irish noblewoman, daughter of James Power, 8th Baron Power
- Cat Power (born 1972), American singer-songwriter, musician and model
- Katherine Ann Power (born 1949), American ex-convict and long-term fugitive
