= James Power =

James Power may refer to:

- James Power (comics), a fictional character in Marvel comics
- James Power (empresario) (1788/89–1852), Irish-born Texan empresario and politician
- James Power (ice hockey) (1884–1920), Canadian ice hockey player
- James Power (planter) (1790–1870), namesake for Powers Ferry vicinity, north of Atlanta, Georgia, U.S.
- James Power (politician) (c. 1796–1847), of Newfoundland, Canada
- James Power (sculptor) (1918–2009), Irish sculptor
- James Aloysius Power (1865–1921), mayor of Waterford
- James Augustine Power (1903–1975), Canadian member of Parliament (1953–1957)
- Sir James Power, 2nd Baronet (1800–1877), Irish politician, barrister, and Governor of the Bank of Ireland
- J. D. Power III (James David Power III, 1931–2021), American marketer
- James Power, the 1791 Irish founder of the Powers (whiskey) brand
- James Power, 3rd Earl of Tyrone (1667–1704), Irish Jacobite nobleman

== See also ==
- James Powers (disambiguation)
- Jim Powers (disambiguation)
