= Kitty Powers' Matchmaker =

2014 video game

- Developer: Magic Notion
- Publisher: Magic Notion
- Platforms: Windows, OS X, Android, and iOS
- Release: September 3, 2014 (mobile); April 22, 2015 (Steam)
- Genre: Dating sim

Kitty Powers' Matchmaker is a 2014 simulation video game that was developed by Magic Notion and published through Mastertronic Group. It is available on Windows, OS X, Android, PlayStation 4 and iOS. The mobile version of the game was released on September 3, 2014 and a desktop edition was launched on April 22, 2015 on Steam. The game's premise has the player serving as an employee to drag queen and matchmaker Kitty Powers.

The game has become popular among Let's Play personalities on YouTube, however the developer has cautioned users about posting videos as the game's soundtrack contains copyrighted music that may be automatically flagged by the website.

== Synopsis and game play ==
Kitty Powers has recently launched a new branch of her dating service and has hired the player to serve as her newest matchmaker. Players can personalize their character and perform a personality quiz to create their own profile. There is an option that lets players allow their character data (minus the name) to other players, who will try to successfully match the character with other people. Clients can be matched up with someone of the same gender.

While playing the game players must try to match their clients' personal tastes with that of their prospective dates. If their attributes are to the other's liking, this will cause the pair to fall in love with one another, but matching up people with opposing interests runs the risk of ruining the date. Dates are held at one of several restaurants themed around various countries, each of which has differing levels of difficulty. During the date players must successfully guide their client through minigames and typical date questions on topics such as hobbies, personality, and employment. If a client finds that their date has expressed a preference or a feature that they do not like, players are given the ability to either tell the truth or lie about their opinion. If they choose to lie, the player must spin a wheel that will decide if the lie is detected or not.

== Development ==
Kitty Powers' Matchmaker's premise was developed by Rich Franke, who chose to incorporate his drag personality of Kitty Powers into the game. He decided to do this for several reasons, stating that he had "been messing about with drag for a while and I wanted a good reason to evolve it and take it to a new place. Secondly I felt drag and video games hadn't really collided properly yet and this might be a good way to do it. Thirdly I wanted to make my debut game unique, and a real reflection of me and my voice. Kitty seemed like a good way to tick all of the boxes."

== Reception ==
Kitty Powers' Matchmaker received "mixed or average reviews" from critics, according to review aggregator Metacritic.

Polygon rated the game favorably, writing "Gay, straight, everything is great in Kitty Powers Matchmaker". Hardcore Gamer was more mixed in its review, and commented that the players would be better off purchasing the game on their mobile devices where it was cheaper and better suited for "the brevity of play". They added that the game also "provides a solid casual title for those looking to play cupid."
