= James Legrand Powers =

- Born: 1871; Odessa, Russian Empire
- Died: November 8, 1927 (aged 55–56); New York, USA
- Occupations: Inventor, businessman

James Legrand Powers (1871 - November 8, 1927) was a US inventor and entrepreneur, the founder of Powers Accounting Machine Company.

== Biography ==
James Legrand Powers was born in Odessa, Ukraine (then the Russian Empire) in 1871. He graduated from Odessa Technical School and worked in the Odessa University mechanical shop. In 1889, he emigrated to the United States and was employed by various engineering concerns including Western Electric.

In 1907, Powers was hired by the US Census Bureau as a mechanical expert to modify unit record equipment invented two decades earlier by Herman Hollerith. Hollerith's equipment was successfully used for the 1890 and 1900 US Censuses, but when Hollerith refused to lower the rental fees for the Census Bureau, the Bureau's director S.N.D. North did not renew the contract with Hollerith's company, creating instead the Census Machine Shop. Powers had already done some experimental work on office machines and received several patents. He managed to circumvent Hollerith's patents and introduced new punched card equipment which was used in the 1910 US Census.

James Powers died on 8 November 1927 in New York, and the obituary appeared in New York Times two days later.

== Powers Accounting Machine Company ==
Powers founded his company in 1911 as Powers Tabulating Machine Company but later changed its name to Powers Accounting Machine Company. Founded in Newark, New Jersey, the company was moved to Brooklyn, New York in 1914.

By 1914, Powers Accounting Machine Company is said to have subsidiaries in Germany, Bulgaria, and Italy; however, the information about them is scarce. German and Bulgarian subsidiaries are said to have been closed during the First World War. Nevertheless, the German agency was re-established in 1923.

In 1915, the Prudential Building Society founded Accounting and Tabulating Company of Great Britain which sold Powers's machines. The French subsidiary SAMAS (a.k.a. S.A.M.A.S. for Société Anonyme des Machines à Statistiques) was established in 1922, alongside the Belgian agency in 1919.

In 1927 the Remington Typewriter Company and the Rand Kardex Corporation merged, forming Remington Rand Inc., which acquired the Powers Accounting Machine Company within a year. After several more mergers, the company became known as Unisys Corporation, which it is today.

== Inventions ==
Mechanical hole-sensing unit Hollerith's tabulating equipment employed an electric sensing unit in which perforations in cards acted as "make and break" electric switches, thus allowing current to pass and energize electromagnetic counters. Since Hollerith was the originator of the technology, his patents protected the electric card reading technique, which meant that the Census Bureau couldn't use it without infringing Hollerith's patents. Powers devised a mechanical sensing unit, which in action was similar to a typewriter. For reading, a set of rods fixed on springs fell on a card. Rods went through the holes of the card and pushed the buttons placed underneath. These buttons acted as an input mechanism connected mechanically to a set of counters or a sorting device.

Powers managed to invent his own system which bore no resemblance to Hollerith's one. The system included the whole set of machines, necessary for tabulating, namely, the electric card punch, card verifier, sorting machine, and printing tabulator.

Printing tabulator Hollerith's tabulators were non-printing, displaying numbers on a row of mechanical counters. This caused pauses during tabulation, as it was necessary to write totals by hand. The Census Bureau Machine Shop introduced the first printing tabulator in 1906. Powers started to produce printing tabulators in 1911, and his machines soon gained popularity. Despite their complexity, they were largely deployed by insurance companies because of their ability to produce written spreadsheets. Powers Accounting Machine Company was the only producer of printing tabulators until IBM introduced its own version in 1920.

Electric card punch In 1907, Powers was detailed to work out an automatic card-punching machine. 300 of these machines were ordered for the 1910 US Census. However, they proved to be unreliable and were soon rejected by the Census Bureau. Several years later Powers Accounting Machine Company advertised different types of electric card punches.

Punch card verifier In 1910, Powers introduced the first card verifier, which was used to check the correctness of punching.

Powers Accounting Machine Company products
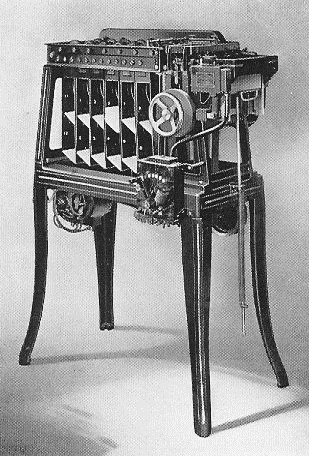
Sorting Machine Model A

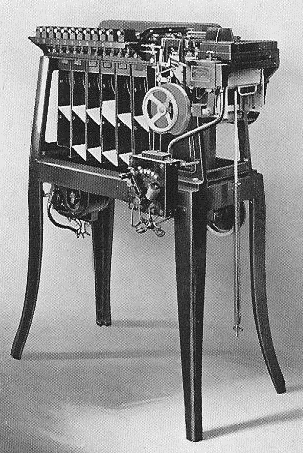
Counting Sorting Machine Model B

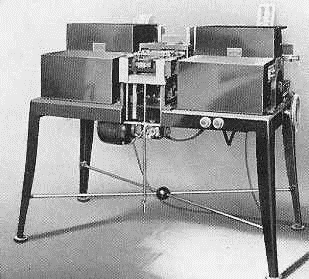
Automatic Tabulating Machine Model A

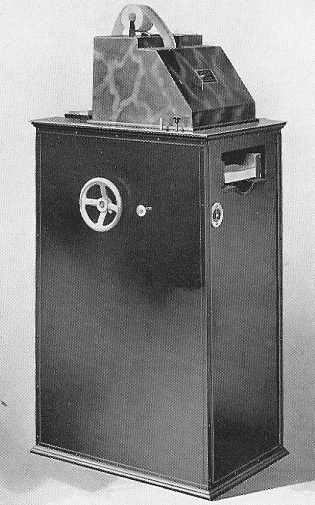
Automatic Tabulating Machine Model B
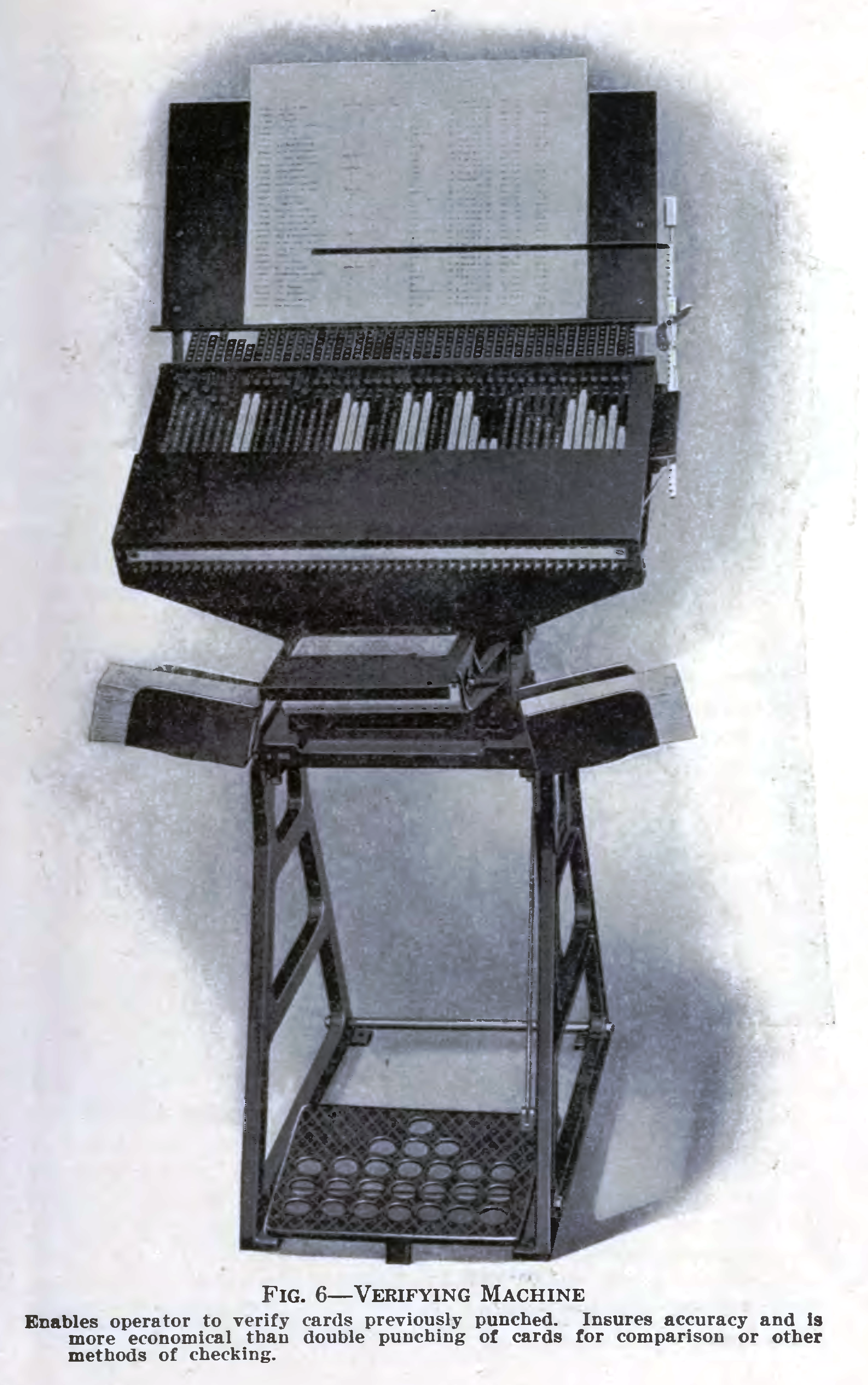
Verifying machine

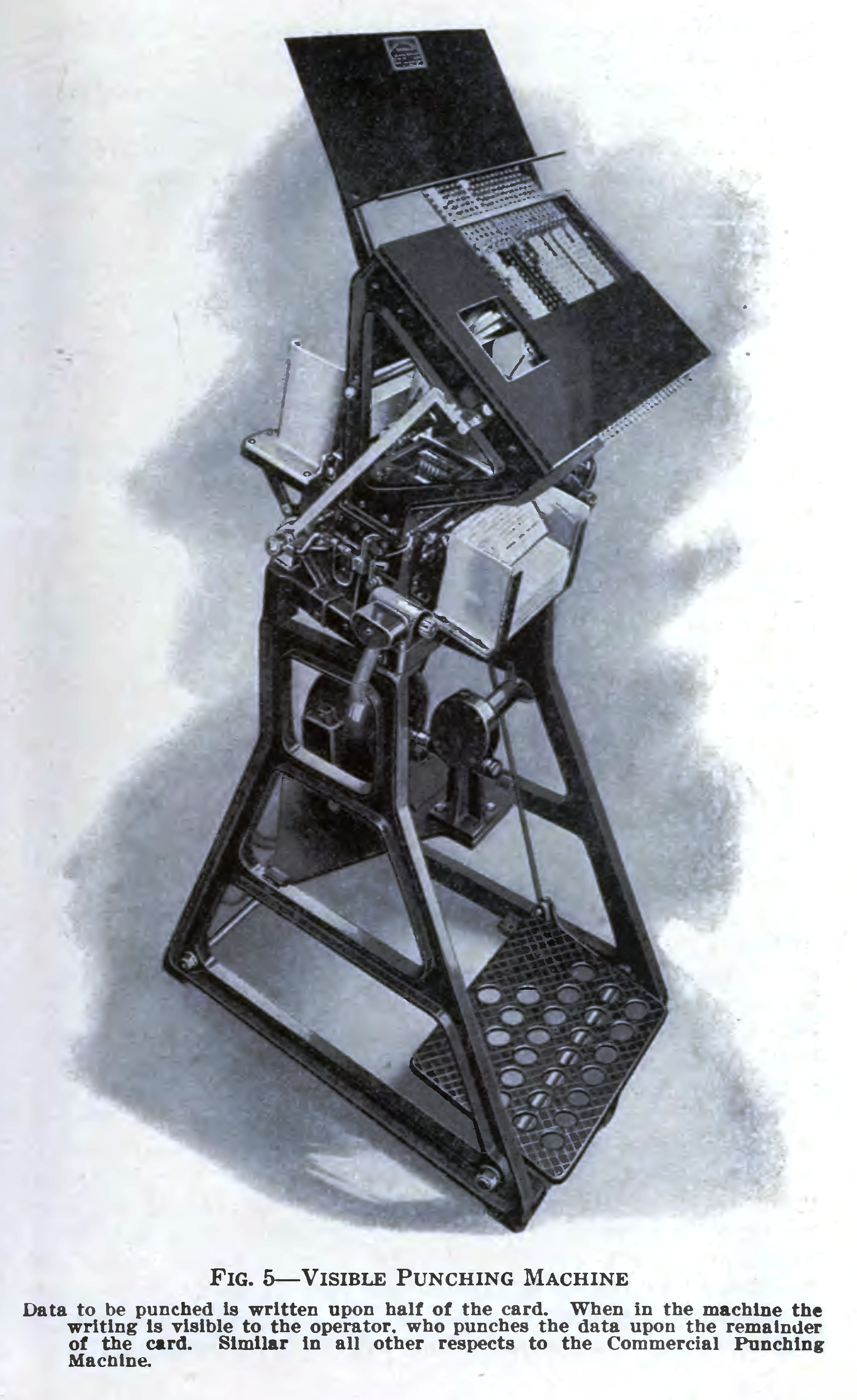
Visible punching machine

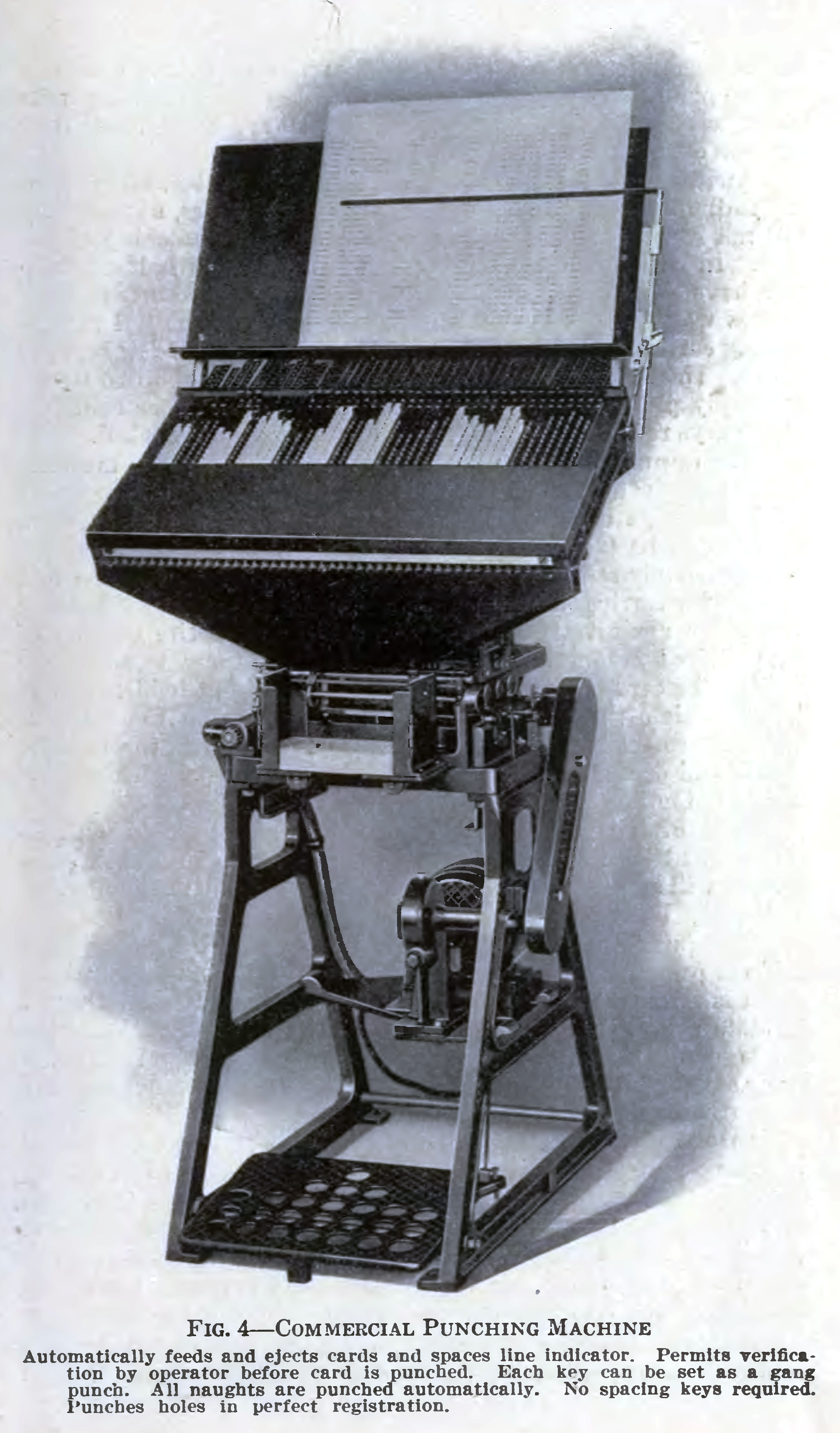
Commercial punching machine

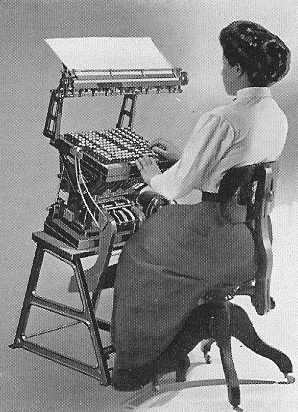
Automatic Punching Machine - Census Model

== Patents ==
- US 992245 Combined Punching and Counting Mechanism
- US 992246 Perforating Machine
- US 1086397 Keyboard for Perforating Machines and the like
- US 1100986 Perforating Machine
- US 1138314 Perforating Machine
- US 1177651 Stop Mechanisms for Card Sorting Machines
- US 1224413 Combined Printing Mechanism and Perforating-Machine
- US 1236481 Card Accounting Machine
- US 1242721 Repeat Perforating Mechanism
- US 1245502 Tabulator-Printer for Statistical Purposes
- US 1271614 Combined Type Writer and Perforating Machine
- US 1299022 Perforating Machine
- US 1312807 Counter for Accounting Machines
- US 1317458 Card-Feed-Actuated Stop
- US 1388299 Combined Perforating and Printing Tabulator Mechanism
- US 1665218 Feeding Mechanism for Tabulating Machine
- US 1836039 Self Starting Automatic Total Taking Mechanism
