= Peter Tesei =

American politician

First Selectman of Greenwich, Connecticut
- In office 2007–2019
- Preceded by: Jim Lash
- Succeeded by: Fred Camillo

Personal details
- Born: Peter James Tesei; March 5, 1969 (age 57) Greenwich, Connecticut, U.S.
- Party: Republican
- Children: 2
- Education: Greenwich Country Day School; Julian Curtiss School
- Alma mater: University of Connecticut (BA)
- Occupation: Businessman, politician

Peter James Tesei (/təsə/; Tes-EE born March 5, 1969) is an American businessman and politician. He served six terms as First Selectman of Greenwich, Connecticut for the Republican Party. He was succeeded by Fred Camillo in 2019. Tesei was a candidate for Lieutenant Governor of Connecticut in 2018.

== Early life ==
Tesei was born March 5, 1969, in Greenwich, Connecticut. His parents returned to town in 1967. He graduated from the University of Connecticut with a Bachelor of Arts in Political Science in 1991.

== Career ==
Before he was elected as First Selectman, Tesei was Vice President of the wealth management group at BNY Mellon in New York. Tesei is the owner of Peter J. Tesei, LLC, a consulting and advisory business and public affairs and communications firm for non-profits. He serves as executive director for Pathway's, Inc.

== Politics ==
In 1988 at age 18, he was elected to the Greenwich Town Representative Meeting (RTM), the legislative body of Greenwich, Connecticut. He spent nearly twenty years in municipal government, serving on the Board of Estimate and Taxation. In 1986, he was endorsed with a letter of support by Lowell Weicker.

In 2007, he was elected First Selectman of Greenwich and served six terms until resigning in 2019.

== Personal life ==
Tesei married Jill (née Vaughan) Tesei, a board certified psychiatric nurse practitioner, who operates an independent practice. They reside in Cos Cob and have two children; James (born 2009) and Caroline (born 2007).
