= David B. Powers Jr. =

American politician

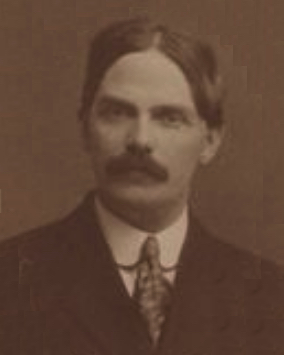

Member of the Virginia House of Delegates for Caroline and King George
- In office August 17, 1933 – January 10, 1934
- Preceded by: George P. Lyon
- Succeeded by: T. Elliott Campbell

Member of the Virginia House of Delegates from Caroline County
- In office January 14, 1914 – January 12, 1916
- Preceded by: Samuel H. Evans
- Succeeded by: Richard L. Beale
- In office January 10, 1906 – January 10, 1912
- Preceded by: Eustace C. Moncure
- Succeeded by: Samuel H. Evans
- In office December 4, 1901 – January 13, 1904
- Preceded by: Samuel E. Pitts
- Succeeded by: Eustace C. Moncure

Personal details
- Born: David Breonard Powers Jr. June 14, 1874 Port Royal, Virginia, U.S.
- Died: January 29, 1936 (aged 61) Bowling Green, Virginia, U.S.
- Party: Democratic
- Spouse: Ruth Andrews (m. 1931)
- Education: Virginia Military Institute; University of Virginia

David Breonard Powers Jr. (June 14, 1874 – January 29, 1936) was an American attorney and politician. He served five terms in the Virginia House of Delegates between 1901 and 1916, representing Caroline County, and was appointed Caroline's Commonwealth's attorney in 1926. In 1933, he briefly returned to the House after winning a special election to succeed the deceased George P. Lyon. At the time of his death, he was the largest landowner in the county.
