= Powers House (Sidney, Maine) =

Historic house in Maine, United States

- U.S. National Register of Historic Places
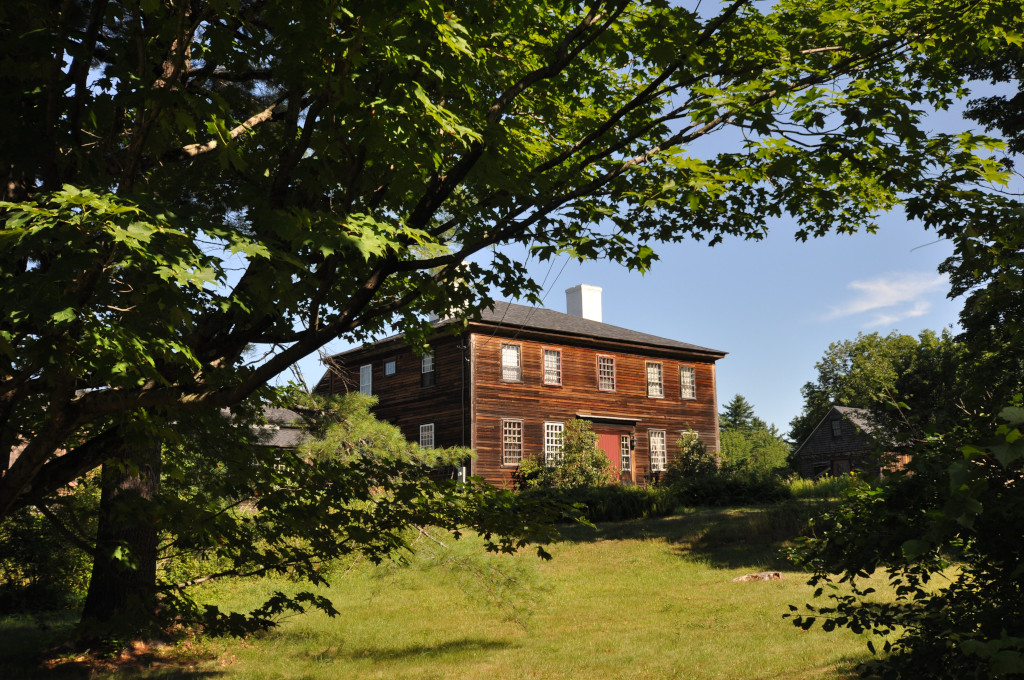

- Location within Maine Location within the United States
- Location: West River Rd., Sidney, Maine
- Coordinates: 44°23′23″N 69°44′7″W
- Area: 1 acre (0.40 ha)
- Built: 1770
- Built by: Levi Powers
- Architectural style: Colonial, Four Square
- NRHP reference No.: 79000150
- Added to NRHP: October 1, 1979

The Powers House is a historic house on West River Road in Sidney, Maine. Built about 1770, it is an important example of late Colonial architecture in the region. It was listed on the National Register of Historic Places in 1979.

== Description and history ==
The Powers House stands on the west side of West River Road (Maine State Route 104), in a rural setting of southern Sidney. It is a two-story wood-frame structure, with a hip roof pierced by two large interior chimneys, and a clapboarded exterior. Its east-facing front facade is five bays wide, with a center entrance flanked by sidelight windows and topped by an entablature and cornice. A secondary entrance is located on the south side, at the center of the three-bay facade. A single-story ell extends southwest from the southwest corner. The interior follows a typical center hall plan, and is distinguished by original flooring and woodwork, as well as some early 19th-century stencilwork. The house in some proportions bears resemblance to the Pownalborough Courthouse.

The house was built by Levi Powers, one of the earliest settlers to the area. Powers was granted land here and arrived in 1760 to clear what was then essentially wilderness. It was purchased in 1783 by Jethro Gardiner, and was for more than 100 years owned by members of the Faught family, who were German immigrants.

== See also ==
- National Register of Historic Places listings in Kennebec County, Maine
