= Enrico Colli =

Italian cross-country skier

Enrico Colli, vulgo Paor (11 December 1896 – 28 May 1982), was an Italian cross-country skier who competed in the 1924 Winter Olympics. He was born and died in Cortina d'Ampezzo. In 1924 he finished ninth in the 50 kilometre competition and twelfth in the 18 kilometre event. His younger brother Vincenzo and his nephew Ilio were also notable skiers.

Further results were:

- 1920: 1st, Italian men's championships of cross-country skiing, 18 km
- 1922: 1st, Italian men's championships of cross-country skiing, 18 km
- 1923: 1st, Italian men's championships of cross-country skiing, 18 km
- 1925:
  - 1st, Italian men's championships of cross-country skiing, 50 km
  - 1st, Italian men's championships of cross-country skiing, 18 km

Preceded by HM the King of Norway Haakon VII, Princess Astrid of Norway, House of Glücksburg & Olaf Helset	President of Organizing Committee for Winter Olympic Games; 1956	Succeeded by (United States) Prentis C. Hale
