= Alison Power =

American biologist

Alison G. Power
- Education: University of Alaska; University of Washington College of Arts and Sciences
- Scientific career
- Fields: Biology
- Workplaces: Cornell University

Alison G. Power is an American biologist. She is a professor in the Department of Ecology and Evolutionary Biology at Cornell University in Ithaca, New York. Her research investigates disease ecology in plant communities, both natural and agricultural, across the U.S., Central America, Southeast Asia, and Africa.

== Career ==
Power earned her B.S. in biology from the University of Alaska in 1979, followed by her doctorate in zoology from the University of Washington in 1985. That same year, she joined the faculty at Cornell University. Fourteen years later, she took on the role of Associate Dean of the Graduate School, followed by an appointment as Interim Dean of the Graduate School. In 2002, Powers was as Dean of the Graduate School. Power has been a member of the U.S. National Committee of the Scientific Committee on Problems in the Environment and the editorial boards of Cornell University Press and Ecological Applications, a professional journal of the Ecological Society of America (ESA). She was one of the inaugural Fellows of the Ecological Society of America, elected in 2012.

== Research ==
Broadly, Power's research laboratory leads experiments in the field and in greenhouses to understand how the landscape and plant genetics affect herbivores and pathogens in natural and agricultural ecosystems.

In May 2019, Power's research program was one of 10 groups selected to receive a grant award through Cornell University's Atkinson Center for a Sustainable Future's 2019 Academic Venture Fund. The Center awarded more than $1.3 million in seed money to interdisciplinary research projects addressing challenges in global sustainability. Power and collaborators in developmental sociology, economics, and plant breeding and genetics launched a study to understand how Ethiopian smallholders mix crop species to create more resilient food systems and limit the impacts of drought and other climate-related stresses.
