= Madison Powers =

American philosopher

- Awards: Robert Wood Johnson Foundation Health Policy Investigator Award

Education
- Education: University College, Oxford (PhD), Vanderbilt University (BA, MA), University of Tennessee (JD)

Philosophical work
- Era: 21st-century philosophy
- Region: Western philosophy
- Institutions: Georgetown University
- Website: https://www.madisonpowers.org/

Madison Powers is an American philosopher and Francis J. McNamara Jr Professor Emeritus of Philosophy at Georgetown University. He is a Fellow of the Hastings Center, a recipient of the Robert Wood Johnson Foundation Health Policy Investigator Award, and is known for his works on political philosophy and practical ethics.

== Books ==
- A Livable Planet: Human Rights in the Global Economy, Madison Powers, Oxford University Press, 2024, ISBN 9780197756003.
- Social Justice: The Moral Foundations of Public Health and Health Care Policy, Madison Powers and Ruth Faden, Oxford University Press, 2006; revised edition, 2008
- Structural Injustice: Power, Advantage, and Human Rights, Madison Powers and Ruth Faden, Oxford University Press, 2019, ISBN 9780190053987.
- AIDS, Women, and the Next Generation: Towards a Morally Acceptable Public Policy for HIV Testing of Pregnant Women and Newborns, Ruth Faden, Gail Geller, and Madison Powers (eds.), Oxford University Press 1991
