= Simon Power =

Simon Power may refer to:

- Simon Power (composer) (born 1958), English composer and sound designer
- Simon Power (politician) (born 1969), New Zealand politician
- Simon Power (footballer) (born 1998), Irish footballer
