= Susie Power =

Susie Power may refer to:

- Susie Power-Reeves (born 1975), Australian runner
- Susie Power (actress) (born 2003), Irish actress and singer
