= Charles T. Powers =

American journalist

Charles T. Powers (1943–1996) was an American journalist and writer, chiefly remembered for his novel In the Memory of the Forest, set in Poland.

A native of Missouri, Powers began his writing career at the Kansas City Star. He was a former Nieman Fellow at Harvard University, and spent twenty years as a journalist for the Los Angeles Times. He spent long stretches of his tenure with the Times as a foreign correspondent in Africa, based in Nairobi from 1980 to 1986, and as Eastern European Bureau Chief from 1986 to 1991, during which time he lived in Warsaw.

Powers lived in Bennington, Vermont for the last five years of his life. While there, he completed his first and only novel In the Memory of the Forest. The book has since been translated into German, French, Polish and Italian.

The New York Times writer Alan Cowell wrote an essay about Powers that was published in 1997 in the International Herald Tribune. Cowell and Powers had worked together as foreign correspondents, based in Nairobi.

Powers was married to the author Cheryl Bentsen.

== Honors and awards ==
- 1964 William Randolph Hearst Foundation award, outstanding collegiate journalist
- 1984 Sigma Delta Chi, the Society of Professional Journalists, for distinguished foreign correspondence
