= Vincenzo Colli =

Italian cross country skier (1899–1961)

Vincenzo "Zenzo" Ilio Colli, vulgo Paor (22 September 1899 – 25 June 1961), was an Italian cross-country skier who competed in the 1924 Winter Olympics. He was born in Cortina D'Ampezzo.

Vinzenzo was the younger brother of Enrico Colli. He was married to Dimai Costanza, née Piero de Jenzio Dea, and father of six children. The fourth, Ilio Colli, was killed in 1953 when he crashed into a tree during a ski race. In 1924 Vinzenzo finished eleventh in the 50 kilometre competition. In 1925 he won Bronze in the 50 kilometres event of the Italian men's championships of cross-country skiing. Later he became instructor of the Sci Club Napoli.
