= Powers Lake (Georgia) =

Powers Lake Number One
- Location within Georgia Location within the United States
- Location: Floyd County, Georgia
- Coordinates: 34.1572585°N 85.2098066°W
- Type: reservoir
- Etymology: Nick Powers Jr. and Nick Powers Sr.

Powers Lake Number Two
- Location within Georgia Location within the United States
- Location: Floyd County, Georgia
- Coordinates: 34.1521097°N 85.2145375°W
- Type: reservoir
- Etymology: Nick Powers Jr. and Nick Powers Sr.

Powers Lake is the name of two reservoirs in Floyd County, in the U.S. state of Georgia.

The twin lakes are formally called Powers Lake Number One and Powers Lake Number Two. Both lakes were named for Nick Powers Jr. and Nick Powers Sr. who were the original landowners.

== See also ==
- List of lakes in Georgia (U.S. state)
