= Powers Lake (Minnesota) =

Lake in the state of Minnesota, United States

- Location within Minnesota
- Location: Meeker County, Minnesota
- Coordinates: 45°10′12″N 94°23′3″W
- Type: lake

Powers Lake is a lake in Meeker County, in the U.S. state of Minnesota.

Powers Lake was named for Michael Powers, a pioneer who settled there.

== See also ==
- List of lakes in Minnesota
