= James F. Powers =

American politician

James Powers

Member of the New Hampshire House of Representatives from the Rockingham 16th district
- In office 2004 - 2008, 2010 - 2012 (died in office)

Personal details
- Born: March 13, 1938 Montague, Massachusetts
- Died: February 22, 2012 (aged 73) Portsmouth, New Hampshire
- Party: Democratic
- Spouse: Eva
- Education: University of New Hampshire, Amherst College, Harvard University, Boston University
- Profession: psychologist

James F. Powers (March 13, 1938 – February 22, 2012) was a Democratic member of the New Hampshire House of Representatives, representing the Rockingham 16th District starting in 2004. He left office in 2008 for personal reasons, but returned in 2010. He died while still incumbent to his seat.
