= Tom Power =

American baseball player (1869–1898)

- First baseman
- Born: 1869; San Francisco, California, US
- Died: February 25, 1898 (aged 28–29); San Francisco, California, US
- Batted: Right Threw: Unknown

MLB debut
- August 27, 1890, for the Baltimore Orioles

Last MLB appearance
- October 15, 1890, for the Baltimore Orioles

MLB statistics
- Batting average: .208
- Home runs: 0
- Runs batted in: 6
- Stats at Baseball Reference

Teams
- Baltimore Orioles (1890)

Thomas Francis Power (1869 – February 25, 1898) was an American professional baseball player who played in Major League Baseball (MLB) for one season. In 1890, he played primarily as a first baseman, but also played as a second baseman, for the Baltimore Orioles of the American Association.

== Career ==
Thomas Francis Power was born in 1869 in San Francisco, California. He began his professional baseball career in 1888, with his hometown San Francisco Haverlys of the California League (CL) at the age of 19. In the following season, he split time between San Francisco and the Stocking team of the CL.

He began the 1890 baseball season with the Baltimore Orioles of the Atlantic Association, before making his MLB debut on August 27 with the Baltimore Orioles of the American Association and stayed with the team through the conclusion of the season. This was his only MLB experience and his final MLB-career totals include a .208 batting average, 11 runs scored, six runs batted in, and six stolen bases in 38 games played. In 1891, he played with, and for part of the season, managed the Rochester Hop Bitters of the Eastern Association. He played for the Oakland Colonels of CL during the 1891 season as well.

He began the 1892 season with the Troy Trojans of the Eastern League (EL) before returning to California and played for two area teams; the Oakland Morans of the Central California League San Francisco Metropolitans of the CL. He stayed in the CL in 1893 and played for the San Francisco Friscos, then returned to the EL, playing for the Binghamton Bingoes/Allentown Buffaloes and the Syracuse Stars. Powers stayed with the Stars to begin the 1895 season, then moved back to California to play for a California Winter League team in San Francisco. He did not play another season in professional baseball.

== Death ==
On February 25, 1898, Powers died of consumption at his home in San Francisco, and is interred at Holy Cross Cemetery in Colma, California.
