= Ilio Colli =

Italian alpine skier (1931–1953)

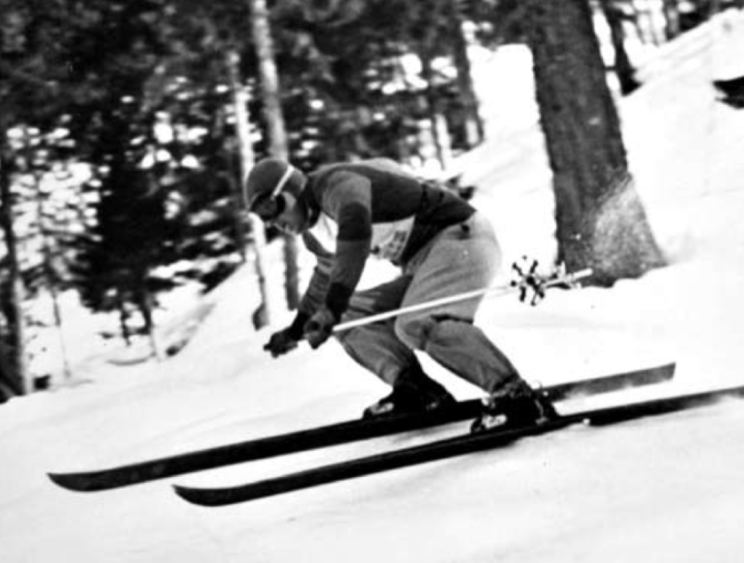
Ilio Colli in 1953

Ilio Colli, vulgo Paor (May 30, 1931 – February 21, 1953), was a skier from Italy. He represented his native country at the 1952 Winter Olympics in Oslo, where he came in eighteenth in the men's downhill event.

Colli, fourth of six children of Vincenzo Colli and his wife Dimai Costanza, née Piero de Jenzio Dea, was born in Cortina d'Ampezzo. He was killed when he crashed into a tree during a ski race at 50 miles per hour (80 km/h) in Madesimo. A ski course at Cortina d'Ampezzo was named in his honor.
